= List of songs written by Bang Si-hyuk =

Bang Si-hyuk, also known as "Hitman" Bang, is a South Korean composer, music producer and record executive with a career spanning over two decades in the music industry. He is the founder of Hybe Corporation.

== Released songs ==
=== 1996–1999 ===
1996–1999

Year	Artist(s)	Song	Album	Lyrics		Music		Notes
Year	Artist(s)	Song	Album	Credited	With	Credited	With	Notes
1996	Park Jin-young	이별 탈출	Summer Jingle Bell			Yes		
1996	Park Jin-young	사랑할까요	Summer Jingle Bell			Yes		
1998	Park Ji-yoon	널 보내고	Blue Angel			Yes		
1998	Park Ji-yoon	천사	Blue Angel			Yes		
1999	g.o.d	"So You Can Come Back to Me" (니가 다시 돌아올수 있도록)	Chapter 1			Yes		
1999	Im Chang-jung	니가 날 버린 날	Story Of...			Yes^{[b]}		
1999	Baby V.O.X	꽃무늬 비키니	Come Come Baby			Yes^{[b]}		
1999	Baby V.O.X	사랑해요	Come Come Baby			Yes^{[b]}		
1999	S♯arp	은밀한 유혹	The Sharp +2			Yes^{[b]}		
1999	S.E.S.	Taming a Playboy	Love			Yes^{[b]}		
1999	Kim Gun-mo	"One Night Dream" (하룻밤의 꿈)	Growing			Yes^{[b]}		
1999	g.o.d	"Dance All Night"	Chapter 2			Yes^{[b]}		
1999	g.o.d	"Train" (기차)	Chapter 2			Yes^{[b]}		
1999	g.o.d	"Friday Night"	Chapter 2			Yes^{[b]}		

=== 2000–2009 ===
2000–2009

Year	Artist(s)	Song	Album	Lyrics		Music		Notes
Year	Artist(s)	Song	Album	Credited	With	Credited	With	Notes
2000	Baby V.O.X	"Bad Boy"	Why			Yes^{[b]}		
2000	Park Ji-yoon	달빛의 노래	성인식			Yes^{[b]}	Park Jin-young	
2000	Park Ji-yoon	귀향	성인식			Yes		
2000	Park Ji-yoon	사랑이 시작되기 전에	성인식			Yes^{[b]}		
2000	BoA	"Chenyeom (Heart-Off)" (체념)	ID; Peace B			Yes^{[b]}		
2000	BoA	"Andwae, nan andwae (No Way)" (안돼, 난 안돼)	ID; Peace B			Yes^{[b]}		
2000	g.o.d	"Why" (왜)	Chapter 3	Yes		Yes^{[b]}	Park Jin-young	
2000	g.o.d	"War of Roses" (장미의 전쟁)	Chapter 3			Yes^{[b]}		
2000	g.o.d	"If the Love is Eternal" (사랑이 영원하다면)	Chapter 3			Yes^{[b]}		
2000	g.o.d	"Sky Blue Balloon" (하늘색 풍선)	Chapter 3			Yes^{[b]}		
2001	Yoon Mi-rae	슬픔에 기대어	As Time Goes By			Yes^{[b]}		
2001	g.o.d	"Fool" (바보)	Chapter 4			Yes^{[b]}	Park Jin-young	
2001	g.o.d	"I Know" (나는 알아)	Chapter 4			Yes^{[b]}	Park Jin-young	
2001	g.o.d	"You Don't Know" (모르죠)	Chapter 4	Yes		Yes	Park Jin-young	
2002	S♯arp	"Magic"	Style			Yes^{[b]}		
2002	Byul	"Why Don't You Know" (왜 모르니)	December 32			Yes		
2002	Byul	별의 자리	December 32			Yes		
2002	Byul	얼마나 사랑하는지 (ft. Rain)	December 32	Yes		Yes^{[b]}		
2002	Byul	마음과 다른 말	December 32			Yes^{[b]}		
2002	g.o.d	"0%"	Chapter 5: Letter			Yes^{[b]}		
2002	g.o.d	"A Number I Should Never Have Dialed" (걸어선 안되는 전화)	Chapter 5: Letter			Yes^{[b]}		
2003	Park Ji-yoon	DJ (ft. Psy For Yamazone)	Woo~ Twenty One			Yes^{[b]}	Park Jin-young	
2003	Park Ji-yoon	가져요	Woo~ Twenty One			Yes		
2003	Park Ji-yoon	어떻게 할까요	Woo~ Twenty One	Yes	Park Chae-won	Yes		
2003	Park Ji-yoon	시작 (Feat. 간미연, Mc Smiely, 가루다)	Woo~ Twenty One			Yes	고동연	
2003	Park Ji-yoon	집시여인	Woo~ Twenty One			Yes^{[b]}		
2003	Park Ji-yoon	잘못 (ft. Sung Si-kyung)	Woo~ Twenty One	Yes	Park Chae-won	Yes	Kim Do-hoon (ko)	Also included Sung's album Try to Remember
2003	Park Ji-yoon	여자가 남자에게 바라는 11가지	Woo~ Twenty One			Yes^{[b]}		
2003	Park Ji-yoon	나 상처 받았어	Woo~ Twenty One			Yes	Park Jin-young	
2004	Park Hyo-shin	"Like Me" (나처럼)	Soul Tree	Yes				
2004	Noel	Intro	New Beginning (아파도 아파도)	Yes		Yes		
2004	Noel	아파도 아파도	New Beginning (아파도 아파도)			Yes^{[b]}		
2004	Noel	청혼	New Beginning (아파도 아파도)	Yes	Park Chae-won			
2004	Noel	"Coolly High"	New Beginning (아파도 아파도)	Yes		Yes^{[b]}		
2004	Noel	"At The Party"	New Beginning (아파도 아파도)	Yes		Yes		
2004	Noel	"Reloaded"	New Beginning (아파도 아파도)			Yes		
2004	Noel	"Romantic Comedy"	New Beginning (아파도 아파도)	Yes				
2004	Noel	"Rewind"	New Beginning (아파도 아파도)	Yes		Yes^{[b]}		
2004	Noel	"Body Jumping"	New Beginning (아파도 아파도)			Yes^{[b]}		
2004	Noel	남과 여	New Beginning (아파도 아파도)	Yes	Kwon Tae-eun	Yes^{[b]}	Kwon Tae-eun	
2004	Noel	"More Than a Woman"	New Beginning (아파도 아파도)	Yes		Yes		
2004	Noel	안녕	New Beginning (아파도 아파도)	Yes				
2004	Rain	"I Do"	It's Raining			Yes	Park Jin-young^{[b]}	
2004	Rain	"Familiar Face" (지운 얼굴)	It's Raining	Yes	Park Chae-won			
2004	Rain	"I" (난)	It's Raining	Yes		Yes		
2004	Rain	"I'm Searching" 찾아요	It's Raining			Yes^{[b]}	Park Jin-young	
2004	Rain	"To You"	It's Raining	Yes	Park Jin-young			
2005	Byul	"Star" (별)	Byul Vol.2	Yes				
2005	Byul	"Another Person" (다른 사람)	Byul Vol.2	Yes				
2005	Byul	"My Guy's Girlfriend" (내 남자의 여자 친구)	Byul Vol.2			Yes^{[b]}		
2005	Byul	"Saving My Best For You"	Byul Vol.2	Yes	강경헌			
2005	Lim Jeong-hee	"Music Is My Life"	Music Is My Life	Yes^{[b]}	Park Jin-young			
2005	Lim Jeong-hee	희망의 끝에서	Music Is My Life	Yes^{[b]}	Park Jin-young			
2005	g.o.d	"From Me To You" (나 그대에게)	Into the Sky			Yes^{[b]}	Park Jin-young	
2005	g.o.d	"It's Alright"	Into the Sky			Yes^{[b]}	Park Jin-young	
2006	Noel	나무	It Was All You (전부 너였다)	Yes		Yes		
2006	Noel	여행	It Was All You (전부 너였다)	Yes				
2006	Noel	늦은 후회	It Was All You (전부 너였다)	Yes	Lee On			
2006	Lim Jeong-hee	사랑아 가지마	Thanks			Yes^{[b]}		
2006	Lim Jeong-hee	운명	Thanks	Yes				
2006	Lim Jeong-hee	거리의 천사들	Thanks	Yes	Lim Jeong-hee			
2006	Lim Jeong-hee	튤립	Thanks	Yes		Yes		
2006	Lim Jeong-hee	"Melody"	Thanks	Yes		Yes	PJ and Kim Do-hoon (ko)(RBW)	
2006	Lim Jeong-hee	"Get You"	Thanks	Yes		Yes	윤갑열,^{[b]} 김반장,^{[b]} 조명진,^{[b]} 김태국,^{[b]} 정상권^{[b]}	
2006	Lim Jeong-hee	"Thanks"	Thanks	Yes	Lim Jeong-hee			
2006	Baek Ji-young	"Woo Ah"	Smile Again	Yes	Park Chae-won	Yes^{[b]}		
2006	Byul	"Fountain of Tears" (눈물샘)	Lachrymal Glands			Yes		
2006	Byul	버려야 할 것들	Lachrymal Glands	Yes		Yes	Kwon Tae-eun	
2006	Ha Dong-kyun	사랑에게	Stand Alone			Yes^{[b]}	Kwon Tae-eun	
2006	Kan Mi-youn	어쩌라고	Refreshing			Yes^{[b]}		
2006	Kan Mi-youn	옛날여자	Refreshing			Yes		
2006	Kan Mi-youn	"Kiss"	Refreshing	Yes				
2006	Kan Mi-youn	이별의 춤	Refreshing	Yes^{[b]}				
2006	Uhm Jung-hwa	"Come 2 Me"	Prestige	Yes		Yes^{[b]}		Arranged with Kim Tae-yoon
2006	Uhm Jung-hwa	"Innocence"	Prestige			Yes^{[b]}		Arranged with Kim Tae-yoon
2006	Rain	"Don't Stop"	Rain's World			Yes^{[b]}	Park Jin-young and Wonderkid	
2007	Wonder Girls	"Bad Boy"^{[a]}	The Wonder Begins (EP)			Yes^{[b]}	Park Jin-young	Included in their album The Wonder Years
2007	K.Will	사랑은 좋은 거	Left Heart	Yes		Yes		
2007	K.Will	버릇	Left Heart			Yes		
2007	K.Will	"You"	Left Heart	Yes		Yes		
2007	Byul	열한번	Byul Vol. 4 – Her Story			Yes		
2007	Kim Dong-wan	삼총사	Kimdongwan Is			Yes^{[b]}	Kim Tae-yoon^{[b]}	
2007	Kim Dong-wan	사랑이 가여워	Kimdongwan Is			Yes		
2007	Kim Dong-wan	사랑해선 안될 사람	Kimdongwan Is	Yes		Yes		
2007	8Eight	사랑을 잃고 난 노래하네	The First	Yes		Yes	Baek Chan (ko); Arranged with Wonderkid	
2007	8Eight	사랑 할 수 있을까	The First			Yes		
2007	8Eight	미치다	The First	Yes		Yes		
2007	8Eight	우린 사랑해선 안됩니다	The First	Yes		Yes		
2007	8Eight	나에게 하루밖에 없다면	The First			Yes		
2007	8Eight	추억이 들린다	The First			Yes		
2007	8Eight	들어요	The First	Yes		Yes^{[b]}		Arranged with Wonderkid
2007	Lim Jeong-hee	사랑에 미치면	Before I Go			Yes		
2007	Lim Jeong-hee	사랑의 반대말	Before I Go			Yes		
2007	Lim Jeong-hee	해요	Before I Go	Yes	Miryo	Yes	Wonderkid	
2007	Lim Jeong-hee	그녀에게 가버리세요	Before I Go	Yes	Baek Moo-hyun	Yes	Baek Moo-hyun	
2007	Lim Jeong-hee	안돼요	Before I Go			Yes	Kim Se-jin	
2007	Lim Jeong-hee	이런 사랑 저런 사랑	Before I Go	Yes	Park Jin-young	Yes		
2007	Lim Jeong-hee	들어요	Before I Go	Yes		Yes^{[b]}		
2007	Lim Jeong-hee	사랑이 끝나면	Before I Go	Yes		Yes		
2007	Bae Seul-ki	"Say" (슬기)	Flying	Yes		Yes	Slyberry	
2007	Bae Seul-ki	"Ride With Me"	Flying			Yes	Wonderkid	
2007	J	술과 순정	In Love Again	Yes		Yes		
2007	Park Jin-young	"Delicious" (니 입술이)	Back to Stage	Yes^{[b]}	Park Jin-young			
2007	Lim Jeong-hee	하늘아 바람아	Single Album			Yes	Kim Se-jin	
2009	T-ARA	"Like The First Time" (처음처럼, Cheoeum Cheoreum)	Absolute First Album	Yes		Yes		Arrangement by Wonderkid

=== 2010–2019 ===
2010–2019

Year	Artist(s)	Song	Album	Lyrics		Music		Notes
Year	Artist(s)	Song	Album	Credited	With	Credited	With	Notes
2010	2AM	"Intro"	Can't Let You Go Even If I Die (EP)	Yes		Yes	Pdogg	Included in their album I Was Wrong
2010	2AM	"Can't Let You Go Even If I Die" (죽어도 못 보내)	Can't Let You Go Even If I Die (EP)	Yes		Yes		
2010	2AM	"I Love You" (ft. Baek Chan & Joo Hee of 8eight)	Can't Let You Go Even If I Die (EP)	Yes	Baek Chan (ko)	Yes^{[b]}	Pdogg^{[b]}	
2010	B2ST	"Say No" (내 여자친구를 부탁해)	Shock of the New Era	Yes	Baek Chan	Yes	Pdogg^{[b]}	
2010	8Eight	"Availability Period" (유효기간)	single album	Yes		Yes^{[b]}		Included in their album The Bridge
2010	2AM	Prologue	I Was Wrong	Yes				
2010	2AM	"I Was Wrong" (잘못했어)	I Was Wrong	Yes		Yes	Pdogg	
2010	Davichi	시간아 멈춰라	Innocence	Yes		Yes	Kim Do-hoon (ko)	
2010	8Eight	Intro: 사랑이 간다	The Bridge	Yes		Yes		
2010	8Eight	이별이 온다	The Bridge	Yes		Yes		
2010	8Eight	"Star" (ft. Changmin and Jinwoon of 2AM)	The Bridge	Yes		Yes		
2010	8Eight	Outro: The Bridge	The Bridge			Yes	Baek Chan	
2010	Kan Mi-youn	"Going Crazy" (미쳐가) (ft. Mir of MBLAQ)	single album	Yes	Pdogg^{[b]}	Yes		Included in her album WATCH
2010	Lim Jeong-hee	"On the Way to Breakup" (헤어지러 가는 길) (ft. Jo Kwon of 2AM)	Non-album single	Yes		Yes		Pre-released single for the album It Can't Be Real
2010	Lim Jeong-hee	"It Can't Be Real" (진짜일 리 없어)	It Can't Be Real	Yes		Yes^{[b]}		
2010	Lim Jeong-hee	내가 미워	It Can't Be Real	Yes		Yes		
2010	Lim Jeong-hee	재 (ft. BTS)	It Can't Be Real	Yes		Yes		
2010	Lim Jeong-hee	아직 내 남자야	It Can't Be Real	Yes		Yes		
2010	SeeYa and Davichi	다 컸잖아	Non-album single	Yes		Yes		
2010	2AM	"You Wouldn't Answer My Calls" (전활 받지 않는 너에게)	Saint o'Clock^{[a]}	Yes		Yes		
2010	2AM	"Like Crazy" (미친 듯이)	Saint o'Clock^{[a]}	Yes		Yes		
2010	2AM	"Mirage"	Saint o'Clock^{[a]}	Yes		Yes	Wonderkid, G.Soul	
2010	2AM	"Nervous" (불안하다)	Saint o'Clock^{[a]}	Yes		Yes	Wonderkid	
2010	2AM	"Love U, Hate U" (ft. BTS)	Saint o'Clock^{[a]}	Yes	BTS	Yes	Pdogg	
2010	2AM	"I Can't Say I Love You" (사랑한단 말 못해)	Saint o'Clock^{[a]}	Yes		Yes		
2010	Lee Hyun	악담	Non-album single	Yes		Yes		Included in his EP 내꺼중에 최고 — Mini Album Vol.2
2010	Lee Hyun	내꺼중에 최고	내꺼중에 최고	Yes		Yes		
2010	Lee Hyun	"Heart Beat" (ft. Song Hee-ran)	내꺼중에 최고	Yes		Yes		
2010	Lee Hyun	Bad Girl (ft. GLAM & BTS)	내꺼중에 최고	Yes	BTS	Yes	Pdogg	
2010	Lee Hyun	왜 나를 울려요	내꺼중에 최고	Yes		Yes		
2011	Kan Mi-youn	"Paparazzi" (파파라치) (ft. Eric)	WATCH	Yes	Pdogg, Eric	Yes	Pdogg^{[b]}	
2011	Kan Mi-youn	바보같은 여자라 (ft. BTS)	WATCH	Yes	BTS	Yes		

=== 2020–present ===
2020–present

Year	Artist(s)	Song	Album	Lyrics		Music		Notes
Year	Artist(s)	Song	Album	Credited	With	Credited	With	Notes
2020	GFriend	"Labyrinth"	回:Labyrinth	Yes	Cho Yoon-kyung, Noh Joo-hwan, Adora, Sophia Pae	No		
2020	GFriend	"From Me"	回:Labyrinth	Yes	Noh Joo-hwan, Jeina Choi	No		
2021	2AM	"Should've Known"	Ballad 21 F/W	Yes		Yes		
2022	Le Sserafim	"Fearless"	Fearless	Yes	Score (13), Megatone (13), Supreme Boi, Blvsh, Jaro, Nikolay Mohr, Oneye, Josefin Glenmark, Emmy Kasai, Kyler Niko, Paulina Cerrilla, Destiny Rogers	Yes	Score (13), Megatone (13), Supreme Boi, Blvsh, Jaro, Nikolay Mohr, Oneye, Josefin Glenmark, Emmy Kasai, Kyler Niko, Paulina Cerrilla, Destiny Rogers	
2022	Le Sserafim	"The Great Mermaid"	Fearless	Yes	Score (13), Megatone (13), Cazzi Opeia, Ellen Berg, Anne Judith Wik, Ronny Svendsen, Nermin Harambašić, Danke (Lalala Studio), TK, Kyler Niko, Paulina Cerrilla, Lee Hyung-seok, Jeong Jin-woo	Yes	Score (13), Megatone (13), Cazzi Opeia, Ellen Berg, Anne Judith Wik, Ronny Svendsen, Nermin Harambašić, Danke (Lalala Studio), TK, Kyler Niko, Paulina Cerrilla, Lee Hyung-seok, Jeong Jin-woo	
2022	Le Sserafim	"Antifragile"	Antifragile	Yes	Score (13), Megatone (13), Paulina Cerrilla, Shintaro Yasuda, Supreme Boi, Isabella Lovestory, Kyler Niko, Ronnie Icon, Nathalie Boone, Danke (Lalala Studio)	Yes	Score (13), Megatone (13), Paulina Cerrilla, Shintaro Yasuda, Supreme Boi, Isabella Lovestory, Kyler Niko, Ronnie Icon, Nathalie Boone, Danke (Lalala Studio)	
2022	Le Sserafim	"Impurities"	Antifragile	Yes	Score (13), Megatone (13), Jonna Hall, Danke (Lalala Studio), Huh Yunjin, Daniel "Obi" Klein, Charli Taft, Kim Chae-ah, Maggie Szabo, Hayes Kramer, Blvsh, Jaro, Nikolai Mohr, Park Sang-yu (PNP), Cho Yoon-kyung (PNP), Lee Hyung-seok (PNP)	Yes	Score (13), Megatone (13), Jonna Hall, Danke (Lalala Studio), Huh Yunjin, Daniel "Obi" Klein, Charli Taft, Kim Chae-ah, Maggie Szabo, Hayes Kramer, Blvsh, Jaro, Nikolai Mohr, Park Sang-yu (PNP), Cho Yoon-kyung (PNP), Lee Hyung-seok (PNP)	
2022	&Team	"Buzz Love"	First Howling: ME	Yes	Soma Genda, Kyler Niko, Ohashi Chippoke, Ella Isaacson, Jbach, Teje, Lucas Santos, "hitman" Bang, Kanata Okajima, Ryoto Ito, Tsingto	No		
2023	Le Sserafim	"No Return (Into the Unknown)"	Unforgiven	Yes	Score (13), Megatone (13), Supreme Boi, Daniel "Obi" Klein, Charli Taft, Arineh Karimi, Cazzi Opeia, Young Chance, Shorelle	Yes	Score (13), Megatone (13), Supreme Boi, Daniel "Obi" Klein, Charli Taft, Arineh Karimi, Cazzi Opeia, Young Chance, Shorelle	
2023	Le Sserafim	"Eve, Psyche & the Bluebeard's Wife" (이브, 프시케 그리고 푸른 수염의 아내)	Unforgiven	Yes	Score (13), Megatone (13), Supreme Boi, Maia Wright, Max Thulin, Benjmn, Gusten Danlqvist, Arineh Karimi, Huh Yunjin, Lee Hyun-seok, Danke (Lalala Studio)	Yes	Score (13), Megatone (13), Supreme Boi, Maia Wright, Max Thulin, Benjmn, Gusten Danlqvist, Arineh Karimi, Huh Yunjin, Lee Hyun-seok (PNP), Danke (Lalala Studio)	
2023	Le Sserafim	"Fearnot (Between You, Me, and the Lamppost)" (피어나)	Unforgiven	Yes	Score (13), Megatone (13), Jukjae, Huh Yunjin, Sakura, Kim Chaewon, Hong Eun-chae, Kazuha	Yes	Score (13), Megatone (13), Jukjae, Huh Yunjin, Sakura, Kim Chaewon, Hong Eun-chae, Kazuha	
2023	Le Sserafim	"Flash Forward"	Unforgiven	Yes	Hiss Noise, Alex Karlsson, Stian N. Olsen (Blueprint), Eliza Vassilieva, Danke (Lalala Studio), Lee Hyun-seok (PNP)	Yes	Hiss Noise, Alex Karlsson, Stian N. Olsen (Blueprint), Eliza Vassilieva, Danke (Lalala Studio), Lee Hyun-seok (PNP)	
2023	Le Sserafim	"Fire in the Belly"	Unforgiven	Yes	Score (13), Megatone (13), Kyler Niko, Paulina Cerrilla, Supreme Boi, Anne Judith Wik, Nermin Harambašić	Yes	Score (13), Megatone (13), Kyler Niko, Paulina Cerrilla, Supreme Boi, Anne Judith Wik, Nermin Harambašić	
2023	&Team	"Firework"	First Howling: WE	No		Yes	Frants	
2023	Le Sserafim	"Perfect Night"^{[a]}	Non-album single	Yes	Score (13), Megatone (13), Sofia Quinn, Amanda "Kiddo A.I." Ibanez, Marcus Anderson, Lauren Amber Aquilina, Jorge Luis Perez Jr., Huh Yunjin, Niklas Jarelius Perrson, Zikai, Ninos Hanna	Yes	Score (13), Megatone (13), Sofia Quinn, Amanda "Kiddo A.I." Ibanez, Marcus Anderson, Lauren Amber Aquilina, Jorge Luis Perez Jr., Huh Yunjin, Niklas Jarelius Perrson, Zikai, Ninos Hanna	Digital single released in collaboration with Overwatch 2
2024	Le Sserafim	"Good Bones"	Easy	Yes	Score (13), Megatone (13), Hybe	Yes	Score (13), Megatone (13), Hybe	
2024	Le Sserafim	"Easy"	Easy	Yes	Amanda "Kiddo A.I." Ibanez, Sean Turk, Joseph Barrios, Alex Fernandez, Jordyn Smith, Hadar Adora, Supreme Boi, Score (13), Megatone (13)	Yes	Amanda "Kiddo A.I." Ibanez, Sean Turk, Joseph Barrios, Alex Fernandez, Jordyn Smith, Hadar Adora, Supreme Boi, Score (13), Megatone (13)	
2024	Le Sserafim	"Swan Song"	Easy	Yes	Slow Rabbit, Justin Tranter, Sarah Troy, Supreme Boi, Score (13), Megatone (13), Kim Chaewon, Sakura, Kazuha, Huh Yunjin	Yes	Slow Rabbit, Justin Tranter, Sarah Troy, Supreme Boi, Score (13), Megatone (13), Kim Chaewon, Sakura, Kazuha, Huh Yunjin	
2024	Le Sserafim	"Smart"	Easy	Yes	Score (13), Megatone (13), Supreme Boi, Arineh Karimi, BB Elliot, Zzz, Paige Garabito, Huh Yunjin, Jasmine Lee Maming, Teodor Herrgårdh, Hadar Adora, Charli, Lee Eun-hwa (153/Joombas)	Yes	Score (13), Megatone (13), Supreme Boi, Arineh Karimi, BB Elliot, Zzz, Paige Garabito, Huh Yunjin, Jasmine Lee Maming, Teodor Herrgårdh, Hadar Adora, Charli, Lee Eun-hwa (153/Joombas)	
2024	Le Sserafim	"We Got So Much"	Easy	Yes	Non Ju-hwan, Sofia Vivere, Danke (Lalala Studio), Huh Yunjin, Hong Eun-chae, Score (13), Megatone (13)	Yes	Non Ju-hwan, Sofia Vivere, Danke (Lalala Studio), Huh Yunjin, Hong Eun-chae, Score (13), Megatone (13)	
2024	Illit	"Midnight Fiction"	Super Real Me	Yes	Noh Joo-hwan, Stella Jones, Ryu Hyun-woo, Moon Ji-young (Lalala Studio), Kim Ji-soo (Lalala Studio), Vincenzo, Danke (Lalala Studio)	No		
2024	Illit	"Magnetic"	Super Real Me	Yes	Lauren Amber Aquilina, Slow Rabbit, James, Marcus Andersson, Sophie Leigh McBurnie, Vincenzo, Oh Hyun-seon (Lalala Studio), Danke (Lalala Studio), Kim Kiwi, Salem Ilese, Yi Yi-jin, Martin	Yes	Martin, Slow Rabbit	
2024	Illit	"My World"	Super Real Me	Yes	Albin Tangblad, Lara Andersson, Elin Bergman, Ellie Suh (153/Joombas), Moon Yeo-reum (Jam Factory, Vincenzo, Noh Joo-hwan, January 8th, Lee Yi-jin, Choi Bo-ra (153/Joombas)	No		
2024	Illit	"Lucky Girl Syndrome"	Super Real Me	Yes	Stint, Alna Hofmeyr, Annika Bennett, Shinkung, Shin Bo-eun (Jam Factory), Yi Yi-jin, Noh Joo-hwan, Vincenzo, Cha Ri (153/Joombas), Na Do-yeon (153/Joombas)	No		
2024	Tomorrow X Together	"I'll See You There Tomorrow" (내일에서 기다릴게)	Minisode 3: Tomorrow	Yes	Lewis Jankel, Uzoechi Emenike, Yeonjun, Kim Min-hyung, Ellie Suh (Joombas/153), Maiz, Yi Yi-jin, Huening Kai, Taehyun, Jeon Ji-eun, Danke (Lalala Studio), Stella Jang	No		
2024	Tomorrow X Together	"- --- -- --- .-. .-. --- .--"	Minisode 3: Tomorrow	Yes	Slow Rabbit	Yes	Slow Rabbit	
2024	Tomorrow X Together	"Deja Vu"	Minisode 3: Tomorrow	Yes	Slow Rabbit, Martin, Supreme Boi, Ryan Lawrie, Moa "Cazzi Opeia" Carlebecker (Sunshine), Ellen Berg (Sunshine), James, Score (13), Megatone (13)	Yes	Slow Rabbit, Martin	
2024	Tomorrow X Together	"The Killa (I Belong to You)"	Minisode 3: Tomorrow	Yes	Tomislav Ratisec (Dystinkt), Yuval Haim Chain (UV), Ebby, Ari PenSmith, Na Jung-ah (Joombas/153), January 8th, Kim Bo-eun, Hwang Yu-bin, Taehyun, Yeonjun, Jo Yoon-kyung, Kim In-hyung, 4 Seasons (Joombas/153), Danke (Lalala Studio), Song Jae-kyung	No		
2024	Tomorrow X Together	"Miracle" (기적은 너와 내가 함께하는 순간마다 일어나고 있어)	Minisode 3: Tomorrow	Yes	Slow Rabbit, James, Soobin, Supreme Boi, Yeonjun, Martin, Taehyun, Maiz, Kristine Bogan, Ido Nadjar, Kirat Singh, Léon Palmen, Sophie Brenan, Mathi Wang, Nick Hahn, HueningKai	Yes	Slow Rabbit	
2024	Tomorrow X Together	"Quarter Life"	Minisode 3: Tomorrow	Yes	Jordan Show, Alexander Shilov, Steve Manovski, Chester "Krupa" Carbone, Hwang Yu-bin, Taehyun, Danke (Lalala Studio), Ellie Suh, Soobin, Na Jung-ah	No		
2024	Tomorrow X Together	"Deja Vu" (Anemoia remix)	Minisode 3: Tomorrow	Yes	Slow Rabbit, Martin, Supreme Boi, Ryan Lawrie, Moa "Cazzi Opeia" Carlebecker (Sunshine), Elin Bergman, James, Score (13), Megatone (13)	Yes	Slow Rabbit, Martin, Maiz	
2024	Enhypen	"Moonstruck	Romance: Untold	Yes	Chris Collins, Koda, Slow Rabbit, Kim Su-ju (Lalala Studio), True (153/Joombas), Yeo Jin-yang (Lalala Studio)	Yes	Chris Collins, Koda, Slow Rabbit, Kim Su-ju (Lalala Studio), True (153/Joombas), Yeo Jin-yang (Lalala Studio)	
2024	Enhypen	"XO (Only If You Say Yes)"	Romance: Untold	Yes	Armadillo, Danke, Jvke, Cho Yoon-young, ZVC	Yes	Armadillo, Danke, Jvke, Cho Yoon-young, ZVC	
2024	Enhypen	"Your Eyes Only"	Romance: Untold	Yes	Tony Ferrari, Kim In-hyeong, Mike Daley, Mot Mal (Lalala Studios), Patrick "J. Que" Smith, Sweater Beats, Wonderkid, Hwang Yu-bin, Danke	Yes	Patrick "J. Que" Smith, Sweater Beats, Wonderkid, Hwang Yu-bin, Danke	
2024	Enhypen	"Hundred Broken Hearts"	Romance: Untold	Yes	Bay (153/Joombas), Eung Ju Kim (MUMW), Hyun Sun Oh (Lalala Studio), January 8th, Jungwon, Liv Miraldi, Nico Stadi, Teemu Brunila, Hwang Yu-bin	Yes	Bay (153/Joombas), Eung Ju Kim (MUMW), Hyun Sun Oh (Lalala Studio), January 8th, Jungwon, Liv Miraldi, Nico Stadi, Teemu Brunila, Hwang Yu-bin	
2024	Enhypen	"Brought the Heat Back"	Romance: Untold	Yes	JHart, Jesse Saint John, Henry Walter, Hwang Yu-bin, Danke, Inverness	Yes	JHart, Jesse Saint John, Henry Walter, Hwang Yu-bin, Danke, Inverness	
2024	Enhypen	"Paranormal"^{[a]}	Romance: Untold	Yes	Count Baldor, Danke, Gabriel Brandes, gxxdkelvin, January 8th, Matt Tomson, Max Lynedoch Graham, Ollipop, Ryan Lawrie, Slow Rabbit, Young Chance	Yes	Count Baldor, Danke, Gabriel Brandes, gxxdkelvin, January 8th, Matt Tomson, Max Lynedoch Graham, Ollipop, Ryan Lawrie, Slow Rabbit, Young Chance	
2024	Enhypen	"Royalty"	Romance: Untold	Yes	Benjmn, Danke, Ellie Suh (153/Joombas), Pearl Lion, Vaughn Oliver, Jo Yoonging, Hyungseok Lee (PNP), Cha Yu-bin	Yes	Benjmn, Danke, Ellie Suh (153/Joombas), Pearl Lion, Vaughn Oliver, Jo Yoonging, Hyungseok Lee (PNP), Cha Yu-bin	
2024	Enhypen	"Daydream"	Romance: Untold -Daydream-	Yes	Johnny Goldstein, Jim Lavigne, Christoper Tempest (Vodka), David Saint Fleur, Jason Derulo, Lee Seu-ran, Kim In-hyeong, January 8th, Kim Bo-eun (Jamfactory), An Yeong-ju	Yes	Johnny Goldstein, Jim Lavigne, Christoper Tempest (Vodka), David Saint Fleur, Jason Derulo, Lee Seu-ran, Kim In-hyeong, January 8th, Kim Bo-eun (Jamfactory), An Yeong-ju	
2024	Enhypen	"No Doubt"	Romance: Untold -Daydream-	Yes	Johnny Goldstein, Theron Thomas, Kasey Phillips, Armadillo, Ranga, Danke, Cho Yun-young, Colin (MUMW), Bay (153/Joombas), Lee Yi-jin, Peridot, Kim Su-ji (Lalala Studio), Bae Sung-min (MUMV)	Yes	Johnny Goldstein, Theron Thomas, Kasey Phillips, Armadillo, Ranga, Danke, Cho Yun-young, Colin (MUMW), Bay (153/Joombas), Lee Yi-jin, Peridot, Kim Su-ji (Lalala Studio), Bae Sung-min (MUMV)	
2024	Le Sserafim	"Crazy"^{[a]}	Crazy	Yes	Score (13), Megatone (13), Iluvjulia, Leven Kali, JBach, Jake Torrey, Supreme Boi, Anthony Watts, Amanda "Kiddo A.I." Ibanez, Huh Yunjin, Sakura	Yes	Score (13), Megatone (13), Iluvjulia, Leven Kali, JBach, Jake Torrey, Supreme Boi, Anthony Watts, Amanda "Kiddo A.I." Ibanez, Huh Yunjin, Sakura	
2024	Le Sserafim	"Pierrot"^{[a]}	Crazy	Yes	Score (13), Megatone (13), Supreme Boi, Martin	Yes	Score (13), Megatone (13), Supreme Boi, Martin	
2024	Le Sserafim	"1-800-Hot-N-Fun"	Crazy	Yes	BloodPop, Omer Fedi, AOBeats, Mark Johns, Score (13), Megatone (13)	Yes	BloodPop, Omer Fedi, AOBeats, Mark Johns, Score (13), Megatone (13)	
2024	Le Sserafim	"Crazier" (미치지 못하는 이유)	Crazy	Yes	Huh Yunjin, Score (13), Megatone (13)	Yes	Huh Yunjin, Score (13), Megatone (13)	
2024	Illit	"Cherish (My Love)"	I'll Like You	Yes	Deputy, Andrew Jackson, Sarah "Solly" Solovay, Charli, Akap, Kim Kiwi, Supreme Boi, Danke (Lalala Studio), Divahh, Vincenzo, Jude, Shinkung, Ssac (Mumw)	Yes	Deputy, Andrew Jackson, Sarah "Solly" Solovay, Charli, Akap, Kim Kiwi, Supreme Boi, Danke (Lalala Studio), Divahh, Vincenzo, Jude, Shinkung, Ssac (Mumw)	
2024	Illit	"Iykyk (If You Know You Know)"	I'll Like You	Yes	Deez, SoulFish, Bekuh Boom, Jude, Lee-kyung (Wavecloud), January 8th, Divahh, Lee Yi-jin, Moon Yeo-reum (Jamfactory), So Do-yeon (Wavecloud), Vendors (Chiller)	Yes	Deez, SoulFish, Bekuh Boom, Jude, Lee-kyung (Wavecloud), January 8th, Divahh, Lee Yi-jin, Moon Yeo-reum (Jamfactory), So Do-yeon (Wavecloud), Vendors (Chiller)	
2024	Illit	"Pimple"	I'll Like You	Yes	Divah, Ryu Hyeon-woo, Ciara Muscat, Malin Christin, January 8th, Noémie Legrand, Lee Seu-ran, Moon Ji-young (Lalala Studio), Forever Noh, Jang Jeong-won (Jamfactory), Vincenzo, Exy, Sohlhee, Zarah Christenson	Yes	Divah, Ryu Hyeon-woo, Ciara Muscat, Malin Christin, January 8th, Noémie Legrand, Lee Seu-ran, Moon Ji-young (Lalala Studio), Forever Noh, Jang Jeong-won (Jamfactory), Vincenzo, Exy, Sohlhee, Zarah Christenson	
2024	Illit	"Tick-Tack"^{[a]}	I'll Like You	Yes	Johnny Goldstein, Sam Martin, Divahh, Slow Rabbit, Shinkung, Tatte, January 8th, Jude, Na Do-yeon (153/Joombas), Choi Mei (153/Joombas), Kim Soo-ji (Lalala Studio), Moon Ji-young (Lalala Studio)	Yes	Johnny Goldstein, Sam Martin, Divahh, Slow Rabbit, Shinkung, Tatte, January 8th, Jude, Na Do-yeon (153/Joombas), Choi Mei (153/Joombas), Kim Soo-ji (Lalala Studio), Moon Ji-young (Lalala Studio)	
2024	Tomorrow X Together	"Over the Moon"^{[a]}	The Star Chapter: Sanctuary	Yes	Slow Rabbit, Feli Ferraro, JBach, Sam Martin, Mark Schick, Danke (Lalala Studio)	Yes	Slow Rabbit, Feli Ferraro, JBach, Sam Martin, Mark Schick, Danke (Lalala Studio)	
2024	Tomorrow X Together	"Resist (Not Gonna Run Away)"^{[a]}	The Star Chapter: Sanctuary	Yes	Slow Rabbit, Carson Thatcher, Ewan Mainwood, Beomgyu, Danke (Lalala Studio), Woo Seung-yeon (153/Joombas), True (153/Joombas), January 8th, Lee Seu-ran, Soobin, Kim In-hyung, Jo Yoon-kyung, Taehyun, HueningKai, Jeon Ji-eun, Na Jeong-a (153/Joombas)	Yes	Slow Rabbit, Carson Thatcher, Ewan Mainwood, Beomgyu, Danke (Lalala Studio), Woo Seung-yeon (153/Joombas), True (153/Joombas), January 8th, Lee Seu-ran, Soobin, Kim In-hyung, Jo Yoon-kyung, Taehyun, HueningKai, Jeon Ji-eun, Na Jeong-a (153/Joombas)	
2025	Le Sserafim	"Hot"	Hot	Yes	Jackson Shanks, Supreme Boi, Ali Tamposi, Feli Ferraro, Score (13), Megatone (13), Huh Yunjin	Yes	Jackson Shanks, Supreme Boi, Ali Tamposi, Feli Ferraro, Score (13), Megatone (13), Huh Yunjin	
2025	Le Sserafim	"Ash"	Hot	Yes	Peter Rycroft, Mark Schick, Casey Smith, Boy Matthews, Huh Yun-jin, Score (13), Megatone (13), Junhyuk, Danke (Lalala Studio), Baek Sae-im (PNP)	Yes	Peter Rycroft, Mark Schick, Casey Smith, Boy Matthews, Huh Yun-jin, Score (13), Megatone (13), Junhyuk, Danke (Lalala Studio), Baek Sae-im (PNP)	
2025	Le Sserafim	"So Cynical (Badum)"	Hot	Yes	Ejae, Vitals, Anthony Watts, Huh Yunjin, Hong Eun-chae, Kim Chaewon	Yes	Ejae, Vitals, Anthony Watts, Huh Yunjin, Hong Eun-chae, Kim Chaewon	
2025	Enhypen	"Bad Desire (With or Without You)"^{[a]}	Desire: Unleash	Yes	Henry Walter, JBach, Jessica Agombar, Slow Rabbit, Armadillo, Jang Yeo-jin (Lalala Studio), Peridot	Yes	Henry Walter, JBach, Jessica Agombar, Slow Rabbit, Armadillo, Jang Yeo-jin (Lalala Studio), Peridot	
2025	Enhypen	"Helium"	Desire: Unleash	Yes	Frants, Jay, Edwin Honoret, Jeremiah Daly, Jesse Thomas, Kalis (MUMW), Armadillo, Peridot, Shizu, Bay (153/Joombas), Choi Mei (153/Joombas), Na Jeong-a (153/Joombas), January 8th, Lee Seu-ran, Hwang Yu-bin (XYXX), Kim Soo-ji (Lalala Studio), Jo Yoon-kyung	Yes	Frants, Jay, Edwin Honoret, Jeremiah Daly, Jesse Thomas, Kalis (MUMW), Armadillo, Peridot, Shizu, Bay (153/Joombas), Choi Mei (153/Joombas), Na Jeong-a (153/Joombas), January 8th, Lee Seu-ran, Hwang Yu-bin (XYXX), Kim Soo-ji (Lalala Studio), Jo Yoon-kyung	
2025	Enhypen	"Bad Desire (With or Without You)" (English version)^{[a]}	Desire: Unleash	Yes	Henry Walter, JBach, Jessica Agombar, Slow Rabbit, Armadillo	Yes	Henry Walter, JBach, Jessica Agombar, Slow Rabbit, Armadillo	
2025	Illit	"Little Monster"	Bomb	Yes	Caroline Ailin, Jesse Shatkin, Dyvahh, Vincenzo, January 8th, 3! (Lalala Studio), Maryjane (Lalala Studio), Dana, Kim Bo-eun (Jamfactory), Leekyung (Wavecloud), So Do-yeon (Wavecloud), Vendors (Chiller and Owl), Jo Yoon-kyung, Bay (153/Joombas), Miah (153/Joombas), Lee Yi-jin, Ellie Suh (153/Joombas), Yoonchae (MUMW)	Yes	Caroline Ailin, Jesse Shatkin, Dyvahh, Vincenzo, January 8th, 3! (Lalala Studio), Maryjane (Lalala Studio), Dana, Kim Bo-eun (Jamfactory), Leekyung (Wavecloud), So Do-yeon (Wavecloud), Vendors (Chiller and Owl), Jo Yoon-kyung, Bay (153/Joombas), Miah (153/Joombas), Lee Yi-jin, Ellie Suh (153/Joombas), Yoonchae (MUMW)	
2025	Illit	"Do the Dance" (빌려온 고양이)^{[a]}	Bomb	Yes	Moa "Cazzi Opeia" Carlebecker (Sunshine), Ellen Berg (Sunshine), Fig Tape, Dyvahh, Frants, Shinkung, Tomoyuki Asakawa, Jang Jeong-won (Jamfactory), Miah (153/Joombas), Bay (153/Joombas), Kim Kiwi, Yunah, Maryjane (Lalala Studio), 4 Seasons (Lee Aeng-do, Kim Chae-ah, and Lee Eun-hwa) (153/Joombas), Huh Yujin	Yes	Moa "Cazzi Opeia" Carlebecker (Sunshine), Ellen Berg (Sunshine), Fig Tape, Dyvahh, Frants, Shinkung, Tomoyuki Asakawa, Jang Jeong-won (Jamfactory), Miah (153/Joombas), Bay (153/Joombas), Kim Kiwi, Yunah, Maryjane (Lalala Studio), 4 Seasons (Lee Aeng-do, Kim Chae-ah, and Lee Eun-hwa) (153/Joombas), Huh Yunjin	
2025	Illit	"Jellyous"	Bomb	Yes	David Wilson, Colin Magalong, Sorana Pacurar, Dyvahh, Kim Soo-ji (Lalala Studio), Belift Lab Inc., Kim Kiwi, Jeon Ji-eun, Moon Yeo-reum (Jamfactory), Lee Seu-ran, Danke	Yes	David Wilson, Colin Magalong, Sorana Pacurar, Dyvahh, Kim Soo-ji (Lalala Studio), Belift Lab Inc., Kim Kiwi, Jeon Ji-eun, Moon Yeo-reum (Jamfactory), Lee Seu-ran, Danke	
2025	Le Sserafim	"Spaghetti" featuring J-Hope of BTS^{[a]}	Spaghetti	Yes	J-Hope, Score (13), Megatone (13), Anika Bennett, Elle Campbell, JBach, Federico Vindver, Gian Stone, Huh Yunjin, Phil Leigh, Alex Jonathan Crofton Ball, Matt Holmes, Tobias Wincorn, Sakura, Park Woo-hyun	Yes	J-Hope, Score (13), Megatone (13), Anika Bennett, Elle Campbell, JBach, Federico Vindver, Gian Stone, Huh Yunjin, Phil Leigh, Alex Jonathan Crofton Ball, Matt Holmes, Tobias Wincorn, Sakura, Park Woo-hyun	
2026	Enhypen	"Knife"^{[a]}	The Sin: Vanish	Yes	Grant Boutin, Connor McDonough, Riley McDonough, Jake Torrey, Armadillo, Gaeko, Supreme Boi, GxxdKelvin	Yes	Grant Boutin, Connor McDonough, Riley McDonough, Jake Torrey, Armadillo, Gaeko, Supreme Boi, GxxdKelvin	
2026	Enhypen	"Big Girls Don't Cry"^{[a]}	The Sin: Vanish	Yes	Thom Bridges, Beau Nox, Marcus Lomax, Armadillo, Beam, SkipOnDaBeat, Gaeko	Yes	Thom Bridges, Beau Nox, Marcus Lomax, Armadillo, Beam, SkipOnDaBeat, Gaeko	
2026	Illit	"Paw, Paw!"	Mamihlapinatapai	Yes	Iselin Solheim, Mathilde Nyegaard, Oliver Ländin, Iroha, Vincenzo, January 8th, Belift Lab Inc.	Yes	Iselin Solheim, Mathilde Nyegaard, Oliver Ländin, Iroha, Vincenzo, January 8th, Belift Lab Inc.	
2026	Le Sserafim	"Pureflow"	Pureflow Pt. 1	Yes	Score (13), Megatone (13), Source Music	Yes	Score (13), Megatone (13), Source Music	
2026	Le Sserafim	"Boompala"^{[a]}	Pureflow Pt. 1	Yes	Thom Bridges, Justin Tranter, Score (13), Megatone (13), JBach, Eren Cannata, Celine Polenghi, Orion Meshorer, Bl$$d	Yes	Thom Bridges, Justin Tranter, Score (13), Megatone (13), JBach, Eren Cannata, Celine Polenghi, Orion Meshorer, Bl$$d	
2026	Le Sserafim	"Celebration"^{[a]}	Pureflow Pt. 1	Yes	Supreme Boi, Aino Jawo, Caroline Hjelt, Louice Hellström, Matilda Winberg, Pär Almqvist, Alexis Duvivier, Victor Cossement, Kim Chaewon, Score (13), Megatone (13), JBach, Dannie Fite, Softest Hard, Huh Yunjin, Young Chance	Yes	Supreme Boi, Aino Jawo, Caroline Hjelt, Louice Hellström, Matilda Winberg, Pär Almqvist, Alexis Duvivier, Victor Cossement, Kim Chaewon, Score (13), Megatone (13), JBach, Dannie Fite, Softest Hard, Huh Yunjin, Young Chance	
2026	Le Sserafim	"Creatures"^{[a]}	Pureflow Pt. 1	Yes	Megan Bülow, David Charles Fischer, Kristin Carpenter, Evan Blair, Score (13), Megatone (13), Danke, Youra (Full8loom), Jeon Ji-eun	Yes	Megan Bülow, David Charles Fischer, Kristin Carpenter, Evan Blair, Score (13), Megatone (13), Danke, Youra (Full8loom), Jeon Ji-eun	
2026	Le Sserafim	"Irony"^{[a]}	Pureflow Pt. 1	Yes	Tropikillaz, Score (13), Megatone (13), Nija Charles, Huh Yunjin, Maya Mougey, Violet Skies, Tyler Lewis, Hwang Yu-bin (XYXX), Park Woo-hyun, Youra (Full8loom), J14 (Full8loom), Kim Soo-ji, Danke	Yes	Tropikillaz, Score (13), Megatone (13), Nija Charles, Huh Yunjin, Maya Mougey, Violet Skies, Tyler Lewis, Hwang Yu-bin (XYXX), Park Woo-hyun, Youra (Full8loom), J14 (Full8loom), Kim Soo-ji, Danke	
2026	Enhypen	"Stuck"^{[a]}	The Sin: Bliss	Yes	Ryan Curtis, Kalvin Beal, Benjamin Falik, Kim Su-ji (Lalala Studio), Kim Sae-byeol (XYXX), Kim Bo-eun (Jam Factory), Na Yun-jeong (Lalala Studio), Kang Eun-jung, Bang Hye-hyun	Yes	Ryan Curtis, Kalvin Beal, Benjamin Falik, Kim Su-ji (Lalala Studio), Kim Sae-byeol (XYXX), Kim Bo-eun (Jam Factory), Na Yun-jeong (Lalala Studio), Kang Eun-jung, Bang Hye-hyun	
2026	Illit	"Super in Love"^{[a]}	Break Even	Yes	Annika Bennett, Ellie ,Frants, Tehya, Lawzy, Sasha Alex Sloan ,Henry Allen, Jasper Harris, Mia (153/Joombas), Danke, Leekyung, Belift Lab Inc., Kim Suji (Lalala Studio), Liljune, Shinkung, Sohlhee ,Moon Seolwool (Mumw)	Yes	Annika Bennett, Ellie ,Frants, Tehya, Lawzy, Sasha Alex Sloan ,Henry Allen, Jasper Harris, Mia (153/Joombas), Danke, Leekyung, Belift Lab Inc., Kim Suji (Lalala Studio), Liljune, Shinkung, Sohlhee ,Moon Seolwool (Mumw)	
2026	Illit	"More"^{[a]}	Break Even	Yes	Nick Weiss, Cecile Believe, Jesse Saint John, Frants, Brooke Candy, Baseck, Lee Aeng-du (153/Joombas), Belift Lab Inc., Moon Ji-young (Lalala Studios), Kelbyul (153/Joombas) ,Jonjon (XYXX), January 8th, Mia (153/Joombas), Crystal Tea, Moon Yeo-reum (Jamfactory), Lee Soo-bin (153/Joombas), Ahn Young-ju (Mumw) ,Lee Geu-rin (Lalala Studio), Leekyung	Yes	Nick Weiss, Cecile Believe, Jesse Saint John, Frants, Brooke Candy, Baseck, Lee Aeng-du (153/Joombas), Belift Lab Inc., Moon Ji-young (Lalala Studios), Kelbyul (153/Joombas) ,Jonjon (XYXX), January 8th, Mia (153/Joombas), Crystal Tea, Moon Yeo-reum (Jamfactory), Lee Soo-bin (153/Joombas), Ahn Young-ju (Mumw) ,Lee Geu-rin (Lalala Studio), Leekyung	
2026	Illit	"You're Under Arrest"^{[a]}	Break Even	Yes	Slow Rabbit, Estratosfera, Qiri, Sorana, Rollo, Iselin Solheim, Mathilde Nyegaard ,Fig Tape ,Blush Davis ,Nathan Fertig, Aaron Theodore Berton, Matthew Crawford, Melanie Fontana, GG Ramirez, Lindgren, Ned Houston, Tim Tan, Tomatomat, Emma Rosen, Yunah	Yes	Slow Rabbit, Estratosfera, Qiri, Sorana, Rollo, Iselin Solheim, Mathilde Nyegaard ,Fig Tape ,Blush Davis ,Nathan Fertig, Aaron Theodore Berton, Matthew Crawford, Melanie Fontana, GG Ramirez, Lindgren, Ned Houston, Tim Tan, Tomatomat, Emma Rosen, Yunah	
2026	Illit	"Pop"^{[a]}	Break Even	Yes	Dave Hamelin, Atia Boggs, Bava, Celine Polenghi, Jin Jin, Frants, Slow Rabbit, Lee Soo-bin (153/Joombas), Kelbyul (153/Joombas), Tatte, Moon Yeo-reum (Jamfactory), Danke, Jo Yu-ri, 3! (Lalala Studio), Oh Hyun-seon (Lalala Studio), Belift Lab Inc., Mia (153/Joombas)	Yes	Dave Hamelin, Atia Boggs, Bava, Celine Polenghi, Jin Jin, Frants, Slow Rabbit, Lee Soo-bin (153/Joombas), Kelbyul (153/Joombas), Tatte, Moon Yeo-reum (Jamfactory), Danke, Jo Yu-ri, 3! (Lalala Studio), Oh Hyun-seon (Lalala Studio), Belift Lab Inc., Mia (153/Joombas)	

== OST ==
Year	Song	Drama / Film	Lyrics		Music		Notes
Year	Song	Drama / Film	Credited	With	Credited	With	Notes
2005	"Dream" (꿈) (sung by K.Will)	A Love to Kill	No		Yes	Park Jin-young	
2009	령혼 (sung by Yangpa)	Soul	Yes		Yes		
2010	바보처럼 (sung by 2AM)	Personal Taste	Yes		Yes		
2010	웃을께 (sung by Jo Sung-mo)	Coffee House	Yes		Yes	Kwon Tae-eun^{[b]}	
2010	"What Should We Finish?" (뭐라고 끝낼까) (sung by Soyeon)	Death Bell 2: Bloody Camp	Yes		Yes		
2010	L.O.V.E. (sung by 2AM)	Acoustic	Yes		No		
2020	"Into The I-LAND" (sung by IU) (sung by I-Land Contestants)	I-Land	Yes	danke, Melanie Joy Fontana, Michel "Lindgren" Schulz, Wonderkid, Song Jaegyeong, Lee Seuran, TOMSSON	Yes	danke, Melanie Joy Fontana, Michel "Lindgren" Schulz, Wonderkid, Song Jaegyeong, Lee Seuran, TOMSSON	Reality Survival Show

== Notes ==
- ^{^[a]} indicates that Bang is also credited as a producer for the album or song.
- ^{^[b]} indicates that the composer is also credited as the arranger.
