= Pureflow Tour =

Concert tour by Le Sserafim

- World tour by Le Sserafim
- Official poster
- Location: Asia; North America; Europe
- Associated albums: Pureflow Pt. 1
- Start date: 11 July 2026
- End date: 20 December 2026
- No. of shows: 35

Le Sserafim concert chronology
- Easy Crazy Hot Tour (2025–2026); Pureflow Tour (2026)

The Pureflow Tour is the second worldwide concert tour and third overall by South Korean girl group Le Sserafim, held in support of the group's second studio album Pureflow Pt. 1 (2026). It is set to be the group's most extensive tour yet, including shows across Asia and North America as well as their first concerts in Europe. The tour began on 11 July 2026, in Incheon, South Korea at the Inspire Arena, and is currently set to conclude on 20 December 2026 in Osaka, Japan, at the Kyocera Dome with 35 shows in total.

== Background ==
The Pureflow Tour was announced by Source Music on 28 April 2026. It is the group's second world tour, following the Easy Crazy Hot Tour (2025-2026), and is their first tour to include concerts in European countries, making it their largest concert tour to date. Demand for the Incheon concerts was high, with both shows selling out on the same day tickets went on sale. Venues for November and December stops in Asia were confirmed on 20 July, along with two shows in Macau.

In planning the content of the tour, the members expressed a desire to tell the story of their relationship as a group. Huh Yunjin stated that the group's "biggest goal with this tour is to really showcase the story of Pureflow, which is the growth of us coming together as a team". Huh added that the song "Need Your Company", with lyrics about the friendship between her and Kim Chaewon, was included on the set list to show the members' wish "to be closer to each other despite how different we are".

For the United States leg of the tour, the group planned to pay tribute to local culture by including special elements for each city they visited, such as wearing cowboy hats for the Fort Worth show in Texas and dressing up as Disney Princesses for the Orlando show near Walt Disney World.

== Reception ==
The Pureflow Tour has received positive reviews. Critics covering the Incheon shows, including Sun Mi-kyung of Chosun, Lee Jung-joo of The Korea Herald, and Woo Ji-won of Korea JoongAng Daily all praised the group's strong performances and choreography, the set list, and the members' appreciation for their fans. Iris Beek of United by Pop, covering the London show, commended the group's "heartfelt performances" and their "ability to make an arena show feel personal" through fan interactions.

== Set list ==
Le Sserafim performing at the Tacoma show on 20 September 2026

This list is taken from the Incheon show on 11 July 2026, and is not intended to be representative of all shows.

1. "Celebration"
2. "Creatures"
3. "Eve, Psyche & the Bluebeard's Wife" (Rina Sawayama remix)
4. "Pureflow"
5. "Need Your Company"
6. "Sonder"
7. "Trust Exercise"
8. "Hot"
9. "Perfect Night"
10. "Blue Flame"
11. "Easy"
12. "1-800-Hot-N-Fun"
13. "Saki"
14. "Boompala"
15. "Antifragile"
16. "Irony"
17. "Crazy"
18. "Spaghetti"
19. "Unforgiven"
20. "Fire in the Belly"

Encore

21. "Fearless"
22. "Iffy Iffy"
23. "No Celestial"
24. "Smart"

=== Notes ===
- "Made My Night" was added to the set list beginning with the North American leg of the tour.

== Tour dates ==
List of 2026 concert dates
Date	City	Country	Venue	Attendance
11 July	Incheon	South Korea	Inspire Arena; Weverse (Note: July 11 and 12.)	—
12 July	Incheon	South Korea	Inspire Arena; Weverse	—
25 July	Osaka	Japan	Osaka-jō Hall	—
26 July	Osaka	Japan	Osaka-jō Hall	—
30 July	Yokohama (Note: Labeled as Kanagawa in promotional material.)	Japan	K-Arena Yokohama	—
1 August	Yokohama	Japan	K-Arena Yokohama	—
2 August	Yokohama	Japan	K-Arena Yokohama	—
8 August	Shizuoka	Japan	Ecopa Arena	—
9 August	Shizuoka	Japan	Ecopa Arena	—
18 August	Rifu (Note: Labeled as Miyagi in promotional material.)	Japan	Sekisui Heim Super Arena	—
19 August	Rifu	Japan	Sekisui Heim Super Arena	—
2 September	Fukuoka	Japan	Marine Messe Fukuoka	—
3 September	Fukuoka	Japan	Marine Messe Fukuoka	—
16 September	Los Angeles	United States	Crypto.com Arena	—
20 September	Tacoma	United States	Tacoma Dome	—
23 September	San Jose	United States	SAP Center	—
25 September	Phoenix	United States	Mortgage Matchup Center	—
27 September	Fort Worth	United States	Dickies Arena	—
30 September	Orlando	United States	Kia Center	—
2 October	Chicago	United States	United Center	—
5 October	Washington, D.C.	United States	Capital One Arena	—
8 October	Newark	United States	Prudential Center	—
16 October	London	England	The O2 Arena	—
18 October	Amsterdam	Netherlands	Ziggo Dome	—
21 October	Paris	France	Accor Arena	—
23 October	Copenhagen	Denmark	Royal Arena	—
26 October	Berlin	Germany	Uber Arena	—
7 November	Macau	China	Galaxy Arena	—
8 November	Macau	China	Galaxy Arena	—
14 November	Taipei	Taiwan	NTSU Arena	—
15 November	Taipei	Taiwan	NTSU Arena	—
28 November	Singapore		Apex @ Expo	—
5 December	Manila	Philippines	SM Mall of Asia Arena	—
19 December	Osaka	Japan	Kyocera Dome	—
20 December	Osaka	Japan	Kyocera Dome	—
Total				—

List of cancelled shows
Date	City	Country	Venue	Reason
6 December	Manila	Philippines	SM Mall of Asia Arena	Cancelled by local promoter Pulp Live World. Ticketholders were moved to the 5 December show or refunded.

=== Notes ===
- Sakura was absent from the Paris show due to illness.
