= Headbanging =

Violent and choreographic shaking of one's head to music

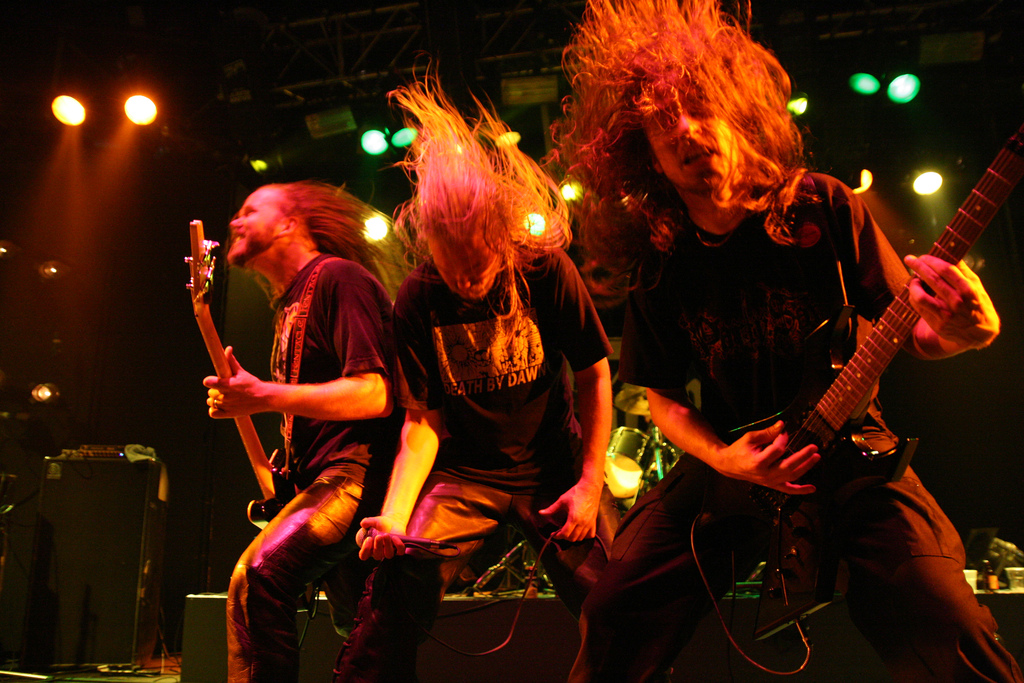
Dutch death metal band Asphyx headbanging during a performance in 2007

Headbanging is the act of violently shaking one's head in rhythm with music. It is common in rock, punk, heavy metal and dubstep, where headbanging is often used by musicians on stage. Headbanging is also common in traditional Islamic Sufi music traditions such as Qawwali in the Indian subcontinent and Iran.

== History ==
Illustrative video of headbanging

=== Sufi music ===
Headbanging has been common in Islamic devotional Sufi music traditions dating back centuries, such as the Indian subcontinent's 600-year-old Qawwali tradition, and among dervishes in Iran's Kurdistan Province. Qawwali performances, particularly at Sufi shrines in the Indian subcontinent, usually in honour of Allah, Islamic prophets, or Sufi saints, often have performers and spectators induced into a trance-like state and headbanging in a manner similar to metal and rock concerts. A popular song often performed by Sufis and fakirs in the Indian subcontinent is the 600-year-old "Dama Dam Mast Qalandar" (in honour of 13th-century Sufi saint Lal Shahbaz Qalandar), which often has performers and spectators rapidly headbanging to the beats of naukat drum sounds.

The most well-known Qawwali performer in modern times is late Pakistani singer Nusrat Fateh Ali Khan, whose performances often induced trance-like headbanging experiences in the late 20th century. Khan's popularity in the Indian subcontinent led to the emergence of fusion genres such as Sufi rock and techno qawwali in South Asian popular music (Pakistani pop, Indi-pop, Bollywood music and British-Asian music) in the 1990s which combine the traditional trance-like zikr headbanging of Qawwali with elements of modern rock, techno or dance music, which has occasionally been met with criticism and controversy from traditional Sufi and Qawwali circles.

=== Rock music ===
The origin of the term "headbanging" is contested. It is possible that the term "headbanger" was coined during Led Zeppelin's first US tour in 1969. During a show at the Boston Tea Party concert venue, audience members in the first row were banging their heads against the stage in rhythm with the music.

Furthermore, concert footage of Led Zeppelin performing at the Royal Albert Hall January 9, 1970, on the Led Zeppelin DVD released in 2003, the front row can be seen headbanging throughout the performance.

However, an instance of headbanging prior to the alleged coining of the term can be seen during Cream's Farewell Concert in November 1968, also at the Royal Albert Hall. Specifically during the performance of Sunshine of Your Love, front row audience members with particularly large amounts of hair are seen quickly bobbing their heads to the music in a fashion typically associated with modern headbanging.

Ozzy Osbourne and Geezer Butler of Black Sabbath are among the first documented headbangers, as it is possible to see in footage of their gig in Paris, 1970.

In the early 1970s, Status Quo was one of the first hard rock bands to headbang on stage.

Lemmy from Motörhead, however, said in an interview on the documentary The Decline of Western Civilization II: The Metal Years, that the term "Headbanger" may have originated in the band's name, as in "Motorheadbanger".

The practice itself and its association with the rock genre was popularized by guitarist Angus Young of the band AC/DC.

Early televised performances in the 1950s of Jerry Lee Lewis depict young male fans who had grown their hair in the fashion of Lewis, where his front locks would fall in front of his face. Lewis would continuously flip his hair back away from his face, prompting the fans to mimic the movement in rapid repetition in a fashion resembling headbanging.

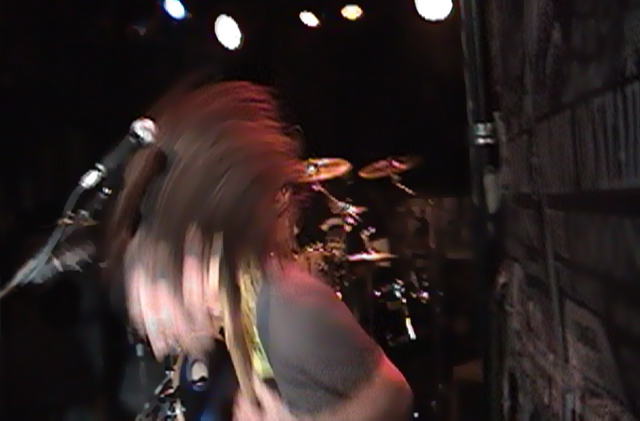
Dave Tyo of Bipolar demonstrating the 'whiplash' technique at CBGB in New York City

=== Parrots ===
At least one parrot, a cockatoo named Snowball, developed the habit of headbanging to music, causing something of an Internet sensation. Scientists were intrigued, as untrained dancing among animals is rare.

== Health issues ==
In the mid-1980s, Metallica bassist Cliff Burton complained repeatedly about neck pain associated with his almost constant and heavy headbanging during concerts or even rehearsals.

In 2005, Evanescence guitarist Terry Balsamo incurred a stroke which doctors postulated may have been caused by frequent headbanging. In 2007, Irish singer and former Moloko vocalist Róisín Murphy suffered an eye injury during a performance of her song "Primitive" when she headbanged into a chair on stage.

In 2009, Slayer bassist/vocalist Tom Araya began experiencing spinal problems due to his aggressive form of headbanging, and had to undergo anterior cervical discectomy and fusion. After recuperating from the surgery, he can no longer headbang.

In 2011, Megadeth guitarist Dave Mustaine said that his neck and spine condition, known as spinal stenosis, was caused by many years of headbanging. That same year, Stone Sour drummer Roy Mayorga suffered a stroke as a result of his frequent headbanging while drumming. The event led to him having to re-learn how to play drums. Slipknot sampler Craig Jones once suffered from whiplash after an extended case of powerful headbanging.

In May 2026, Kim Chaewon, a member of the South Korean girl group Le Sserafim, was forced to take a temporary hiatus from group activities to recover from a neck injury. The injury was closely linked to the group's promotional performances for their single "Celebration", which featured intense headbanging choreography that had previously sparked public concern over the physical strain it placed on the members' necks.

Several case reports can be found in the medical literature which connect excessive headbanging to aneurysms and hematomas within the brain and damage to the arteries in the neck which supply the brain. More specifically, cases with damage to the basilar artery, the carotid artery and the vertebral artery have been reported. Several case reports also associated headbanging with subdural hematoma, sometimes fatal, and mediastinal emphysema similar to shaken baby syndrome. An observational study comparing headbanging to non-headbanging teenagers in a dance marathon concluded that the activity is associated with pain in varying parts of the body, most notably the neck, where it manifests as whiplash.

== See also ==
- Chronic traumatic encephalopathy
- Corpsegrinder
- Crowd surfing
- Dutty Wine
- Hard rock
- Headbangers Ball
- Heavy metal music
- Heavy metal subculture
- List of dances
- Moshing
- Punk rock
- Sign of the horns
- Stage diving
- Yoshiki (musician)
