= Pureflow Pt. 1 =

- Digital and "Vol. 1 Birch Scar" version cover

Studio album by Le Sserafim
- Released: May 22, 2026
- Length: 27:01
- Languages: Korean; English
- Labels: Source; YG Plus; Geffen
- Producers: 13; Pär Almqvist; B Ham; Evan Blair; B. Lewis; Nathan Butts; Thom Bridges; Victor Cossement; Alexis Duvivier; Dan Farber; Dannie Fite; "Hitman" Bang; Jon Santana; Softest Hard; Tropikillaz

Le Sserafim chronology
Spaghetti (2025)	Pureflow Pt. 1 (2026)	Made My Night (2026)

Singles from Pureflow Pt. 1
- 1. "Celebration" Released: April 24, 2026; 2. "Boompala" Released: May 22, 2026

Professional ratings
Review scores
Source	Rating
AllMusic	4/5 stars
IZM	2.5/5 stars

Pureflow Pt. 1 (stylized as 'PUREFLOW' pt. 1) is the second studio album by South Korean girl group Le Sserafim, released by Source Music on May 22, 2026. The album contains 11 tracks, including the singles "Celebration" and "Boompala", released on April 24 and May 22, respectively, and incorporates a variety of genres, including pop, rock, electronic, and Latin musical styles.

The album debuted at number one on South Korea's Circle Album Chart with 570,000 copies sold in its first week, and in the United States, it became the group's fifth top 10 album on the Billboard 200 albums chart. To promote the album, Le Sserafim embarked on the Pureflow Tour in 2026.

== Background and release ==
On March 5, 2026, it was reported by Daily Sports that Le Sserafim would release a new song in late April. On April 8, the group posted a teaser video to their YouTube channel titled "A congratulatory delegation emerges...", and shared an Instagram post with the hashtag "#TimeToCelebrate". On April 13, Source Music announced that Le Sserafim would release their second studio album Pureflow Pt. 1 on May 22, 2026, with the lead single "Celebration" to be released on April 24. Alongside the album and single announcement, a teaser video for the album was posted, containing the tagline "For we are not fearless, and therefore powerful". Pre-orders for the album were made available later that day. The album trailer "We Walkin' Here" was released on April 17, featuring the group "overcoming their weaknesses [as a] chosen family". The lead single "Celebration" was released on April 24, alongside its music video.

A promotion timetable for the album was released on May 6, revealing the title of the second single, "Boompala". An interactive website titled "Boompala Pavilion" was made available on May 11, revealing the album's track listing. Between May 12 and 15, concept photos for the Birch Scar (featuring the members wearing Frankenstein-inspired 19th century horror outfits), Yusu Lily (with the members lying in calm water), Peony Room (featuring the members putting on nail polish and braiding each other's hair) and compact (with the members posing at various locations in the Hybe building) versions of the album were released. The album's highlight medley was released on May 19, and music video teasers for "Boompala" were revealed on May 20 and 21. Pureflow Pt. 1 was released on May 22, 2026 alongside the music video for "Boompala".

== Composition and lyrics ==
The intro track, "Pureflow", is a "synthy" punk rock track with spoken-word lyrics, setting the tone for the rest of the album. The second track, "Boompala", is a Latin house track that incorporates a sample of the song "Macarena" by Los del Río. It conveys a message of letting go of one's fears instead of "obsessing over what cannot be grasped" through lyrics such as "You can't hold onto the clouds in the air" and "Nothing's forever so nothing's to fear", The song describes using one's fears to drive positive change, expressed with a cheerful energy. The lead single, "Celebration", is a melodic techno and hardstyle song with an "intense" beat and "addictive" melody, whose lyrics describe the moment when one gains the strength to face their fears, celebrating that they are still here after everything they have been through. The fourth track, "Creatures", combines pop, rock, and electronic styles, and its lyrics describe the group's desire to "choose freedom in the face of oppressive gazes surrounding [them]". The fifth track, "Iffy Iffy", is an EDM and Europop-inspired song that celebrates the moment when one acknowledges their fears for the first time.

The sixth track, "Need Your Company", a psychedelic pop song written by Huh Yunjin, bridges the first and second halves of the album, describing her relationship with the other members and trying to understand the differences in each other's personalities. The seventh track, "Sonder", is a simple pop-style waltz track about how "even passing strangers harbor their own magnificent universes." The eighth track, "Saki", featuring American rapper Aliyah's Interlude, is a hip hop dance song which includes a callback to the group's previous song "1-800-Hot-N-Fun", which featured the lyric "Where the heck is Saki?", using Sakura's alter ego to describe malicious rumors about the group. The ninth track, "Irony", is a Latin pop song with a catchy sound and heavy bass, and the tenth track, "Trust Exercise", is a pop song about the emotion of wanting to get to know someone slowly, contrasting the attitude of "Need Your Company". The final track, "Liminal Space", which was co-written by all five members of Le Sserafim, presents a conversation the group recorded in the car which ends with the simple question "But where are we going?"

== Promotion ==
On April 28, 2026, Source Music announced that Le Sserafim would embark on the Pureflow Tour in 2026. The tour is planned to begin on July 11 in Incheon, and will include stops across Asia and the United States as well as the group's first shows in Europe. One day prior to the album's release, on May 21, the group held a live event in collaboration with Spotify, titled "Pure Flowers Live", at the Seosomun Shrine History Museum in Seoul. The event featured a performance from the group, with previews of upcoming songs from the album. Following the album's release, the group partnered with the Japanese fitness brand Freecycle to create special indoor cycling lesson programs featuring new songs from the album. The group also hosted a pop-up store, "Le Sserafim 2026 S/S Pop-Up", at Hybe's headquarters in Seoul from May 22 to June 2.

== Commercial performance ==
In South Korea, Pureflow Pt. 1 sold 435,675 copies in its first day on the Hanteo album chart, the biggest debut by a fourth generation K-pop girl group in 2026. By the end of its first week, the album had sold 623,273 copies in the country across all available versions, debuting atop the Circle Album Chart with 570,480 copies of the standard CD version sold. In the United States, the album debuted at number 10 on the Billboard 200 album chart, becoming the group's fifth top 10 album in the country.

== Track listing ==
Pureflow Pt. 1 track listing
No.	Title	Writer(s)	Producer(s)	Length
1.	"Pureflow"	Score (13); Megatone (13); Source Music; "Hitman" Bang	13	1:49
2.	"Boompala"	Thom Bridges; Justin Tranter; Score (13); Megatone (13); "Hitman" Bang; JBach; Eren Cannata; Celine Polenghi; Orion Meshorer; Bl$$d	Thom Bridges; 13; "Hitman" Bang	2:56
3.	"Celebration"	Supreme Boi; Aino Jawo; Caroline Hjelt; Louice Hellström; Matilda Winberg; Pär Almqvist; "Hitman" Bang; Alexis Duvivier; Victor Cossement; Kim Chaewon; Score (13); Megatone (13); JBach; Dannie Fite; Softest Hard; Huh Yunjin; Young Chance	Softest Hard; Pär Almqvist; 13; "Hitman" Bang; Alexis Duvivier; Victor Cossement; Dannie Fite	2:33
4.	"Creatures"	Megan Bülow; David Charles Fischer; Kristin Carpenter; Evan Blair; Score (13); Megatone (13); "Hitman" Bang; Danke; Youra (Full8loom); Jeon Ji-eun	Evan Blair; 13; "Hitman" Bang	3:08
5.	"Iffy Iffy"	B Ham; Jon Santana; Shae Jacobs; Hadar Adora; BaeBae; MRose; Score (13); Megatone (13); Huh Yunjin; Youra (Full8loom); Hong Eunchae	B Ham; Jon Santana; Shae Jacobs^{[a]}	2:09
6.	"Need Your Company" (우리 어떻게 더 사귈 수 있을까; Uri eotteoke deo sagwil su isseulkka; 'How can we get closer?')	Huh Yunjin; Score (13); Megatone (13)	13	1:58
7.	"Sonder"	Anthony Watts; B. Lewis; Faangs; Jeon Ji-eun; Huh Yunjin; Youra (Full8loom); Score (13); Megatone (13); J14 (Full8loom); Kim Su-ji; Jinli (Full8loom)	B. Lewis	2:46
8.	"Saki" (featuring Aliyah's Interlude)	8AE; Aliyah's Interlude; Dan Farber; Nathan Butts; Sorana; Huh Yunjin; Score (13); Megatone (13)	Dan Farber^{[p]}; Nathan Butts	2:44
9.	"Irony"	Tropikillaz; Score (13); Megatone (13); Nija Charles; Huh Yunjin; Maya Mougey; "Hitman" Bang; Violet Skies; Tyler Lewis; Hwang Yu-bin (XYXX); Park Woo-hyun; Youra (Full8loom); J14 (Full8loom); Kim Su-ji; Danke	13; Tropikillaz; "Hitman" Bang	2:24
10.	"Trust Exercise"	Score (13); Megatone (13); Huh Yunjin; Kim Chaewon; Kazuha; Danke; Hong Eunchae; Lee Eun-hwa; Kim Chae-ah; Lee Aeng-du; Moon Ji-yeong; Mola (PNP)	13	2:23
11.	"Liminal Space"	Score (13); Megatone (13); Kim Chaewon; Sakura; Huh Yunjin; Kazuha; Hong Eunchae	13	2:11
Total length:				27:01

=== Notes ===
- ^{^[a]} signifies an additional producer
- ^{^[p]} signifies a primary and vocal producer
- "Boompala" contains a sample of "Macarena", written by Antonio Romero and Rafael Ruiz Amador, and performed by Los Del Río.

== Personnel ==
All credits are adapted from album liner notes.

=== Musicians ===
- Le Sserafim – vocals (all tracks), background vocals (tracks 3, 7, 8)
- Score (13) – production (tracks 1–4, 6, 9–11), keyboards (track 1, 2, 6, 9–11), drums (track 1, 6, 9–11), bass (track 3), digital editing (tracks 1–4, 6–9, 11), vocal arrangement (tracks 1–9, 11)
- Megatone (13) – production (tracks 1–4, 6, 9–11), bass (track 1, 2, 6, 9–11), guitar (track 1, 3, 6, 9–11), digital editing (tracks 1–4, 6–9, 11), vocal arrangement (tracks 1–9, 11)
- Thom Bridges – production, drums, guitar, programming (track 2)
- "Hitman" Bang – production (tracks 2–4, 9)
- Hoyeon Kim – background vocals (tracks 2, 6, 10)
- Softest Hard – production, keyboards (track 3)
- Dannie Fite – production, drums (track 3)
- Pär Almqvist – production (track 3)
- Alexis Duvivier – production (track 3)
- Victor Cossement – production (track 3)
- Evan Blair – production, bass, drums, guitar, keyboards, vocal arrangement (track 4)
- Kristin Carpenter – background vocals (track 4)
- Megan Bülow – background vocals (track 4)
- B Ham – production, bass, drums, guitar, keyboards, digital editing, vocal arrangement (track 5)
- Jon Santana – production, bass, drums, guitar, keyboards, digital editing, vocal arrangement (track 5)
- Shae Jacobs – additional production (track 5)
- Hadar Adora – background vocals (track 5)
- B. Lewis – production, bass, drums, keyboards, vocoder, vocal arrangement (track 7)
- Faangs – background vocals (track 7)
- Aliyah's Interlude – vocals (track 8)
- Dan Farber – production, drum programming, synthesizer, vocal production (track 8)
- Nathan Butts – production (track 8)
- Tropikillaz – production, bass, drums (track 9)
- Nija Charles – background vocals (track 9)
- Kim Junhyuk – digital editing (tracks 2, 5, 9, 10), vocal arrangement (track 10)

=== Technical ===
- Joe LaPorta – mastering (all tracks)
- Geoff Swan – mixing (track 1)
- Matt Cahill – mixing assistance (track 1)
- Tom Norris – mixing (tracks 2, 5)
- Victor Verpillat – mixing assistance (tracks 2, 5)
- Marti Bresso – mixing (track 3)
- Adam Hawkins – mixing (track 4)
- Mitch McCarthy – mixing (track 6)
- Patrizio "Teezio" Pigliapoco – mixing, mastering (track 7)
- Emiliano Olocco – mixing assistance (track 7)
- Dan Grech-Marguerat – mixing (track 8)
- Luke Burgoyne – mixing assistance (track 8)
- Seb Maletka-Catala – mixing assistance (track 8)
- John Hanes – mixing (tracks 9, 10)
- Yang Ha-jeong – recording engineering (tracks 1–3, 7)
- Tak Hyun-gwan – recording engineering (tracks 1, 2, 6)
- Lee Sung-hoon – recording engineering (tracks 1–6, 9, 10)
- Lee Dong-geun – recording engineering (tracks 2, 3, 9)
- Lee Pyung-ook – recording engineering (tracks 2, 7–10)
- Lee Yuna – recording engineering (tracks 4, 5, 7)
- Hwang Min-hee – recording engineering (track 6)
- Ju Seon-gyo – recording engineering (tracks 8, 9)
- Kim Su-jeong – recording engineering (track 8)
- Craig Tinevimbo Mangachena – recording engineering (track 8)
- Ant Hippsley – project coordination (track 8)
- Amy Samson – project coordination (track 8)

== Charts ==
=== Weekly charts ===
Weekly chart performance for Pureflow Pt. 1
Chart (2026)	Peak position
Austrian Albums (Ö3 Austria)	25
Belgian Albums (Ultratop Flanders)	43
Belgian Albums (Ultratop Wallonia)	80
French Albums (SNEP)	35
German Albums (Offizielle Top 100)	44
Greek Albums (IFPI)	3
Hungarian Physical Albums (MAHASZ)	14
Japanese Albums (Oricon)	2
Japanese Combined Albums (Oricon)	2
Japanese Hot Albums (Billboard Japan)	3
New Zealand Albums (RMNZ)	34
Polish Albums (ZPAV)	90
Portuguese Albums (AFP)	61
Slovak Albums (ČNS IFPI)	81
South Korean Albums (Circle)	1
Swiss Albums (Schweizer Hitparade)	51
UK Album Downloads (Official Charts)	64
US Billboard 200	10
US World Albums (Billboard)	1

=== Monthly charts ===
Monthly chart performance for Pureflow Pt. 1
Chart (2026)	Peak position
Japanese Albums (Oricon)	5
South Korean Albums (Circle)	4

== Certifications ==
Certifications for Pureflow Pt. 1
Region	Certification	Certified units/sales
Japan (RIAJ)	Gold	100,000^{^}
South Korea (KMCA)	Platinum	250,000^{^}
^{^} Shipments figures based on certification alone.

== Release history ==
Release history for Pureflow Pt. 1
Region	Date	Format	Label	Ref
Various	May 22, 2026	Digital download; streaming	Source; Geffen	
South Korea	May 22, 2026	CD	Source; YG Plus	
South Korea	May 29, 2026	Vinyl LP	Source; YG Plus	
United States	May 29, 2026	Vinyl LP	Source; Geffen	
