= Tyler Lewis =

English singer

- Genre: R&B
- Occupations: Singer; songwriter
- Years active: 2020–present
- Label: MUZO BY UZO
- Website: tylerlewis.os.fan

Tyler Lewis is an English R&B singer and songwriter with Sri Lankan, Dutch, Portuguese, and South African heritage. In 2023, Lewis became the first artist to sign to producer MNEK's MUZO by UZO record label.

== History ==
She appeared as a contestant in the group Nostalia on the reality television music competition Little Mix The Search, working as a receptionist at a hotel and volunteering on a farm at the time.

== Discography ==
=== Extended plays ===
Title	Details
Wait 'til She Gets Her Heart Broken	Released: 31 July 2024; Label: MUZO BY UZO; Format: Digital download, streaming, Vinyl

=== Singles ===
Title	Year	Album
"Downtime"	2024	Wait 'til She Gets Her Heart Broken
"Fly on the wall"	2024	Wait 'til She Gets Her Heart Broken
"Something in the Air (at Christmas)"	2024	Non-album singles
"Have Yourself a Merry Little Christmas"	2024	Non-album singles
"Traces"	2025	Non-album singles
"Hella Jealous"	2025	Non-album singles
"Til' Death Do Us Part"	2026	Non-album singles
"Yesterday"	2026	Non-album singles

=== Songwriting credits ===
Title	Year	Artist	Album
"Christmas All Year"	2023	Äyanna	Ä Suburban Christmas
"Boys Like U"	2024	Äyanna	About Ä Boy
"Jingle Belle Shop"	2024	Äyanna	Ä Suburban Christmas
"December 24"	2024	Äyanna	Ä Suburban Christmas
"Where I Wanna Be"	2025	Ebubé	Slow Jam Szn
"Là où j’aimerais être"	2025	Ebubé	Non-album singles
"Never Be Me"	2025	HITGS	Things we love : H
"Be A Man"	2025	Äyanna	Non-album single
"Babywoman"	2025	Äyanna	Non-album single
"Coming Home"	2026	Ebubé	A Mile In My Mind
"Up from Here"	2026	Yeat	ADL
"Irony"	2026	Le Sserafim	Pureflow Pt. 1
