= Boompala =

- Le Sserafim Packages cover

Single by Le Sserafim

from the album Pureflow Pt. 1
- Released: May 22, 2026
- Genre: Latin house
- Length: 2:56
- Label: Source; Geffen
- Songwriters: Thom Bridges; Justin Tranter; Score (13); Megatone (13); "Hitman" Bang; JBach; Eren Cannata; Celine Polenghi; Orion Meshorer; Bl$$d
- Producers: Thom Bridges; 13; "Hitman" Bang

Le Sserafim singles chronology
"Celebration" (2026)	"Boompala" (2026)	"Iconic by Mistake" (2026)

Music video
- "Boompala" on YouTube

"Boompala" is a song by South Korean girl group Le Sserafim. It was released on May 22, 2026 by Source Music as the second single from the group's second studio album Pureflow Pt. 1 (2026). "Boompala" is a Latin house song that incorporates an interpolation of "Macarena" by Los del Río, and its lyrics convey a message of letting go of one's fears and using them to drive positive change.

== Background ==
On March 5, 2026, it was reported by Daily Sports that Le Sserafim would release a new song in late April. On April 13, Source Music announced that Le Sserafim would release their second studio album Pureflow Pt. 1 on May 22, 2026, with the lead single "Celebration" set to be released on April 24. A promotion timetable for the album was released on May 6, revealing the title of the album's second single, "Boompala". On May 8, a teaser video titled "Just Boompala" was released, featuring a snippet of the song. An interactive website titled "Boompala Pavilion" was made available on May 11, revealing the album's track listing, with "Boompala" as the second track. A teaser video featuring a longer snippet of the song and some of its choreography was released on May 18. Teasers for the song's music video were released on May 20 and 21. "Boompala" was released on May 22, alongside its music video. Two performance videos for "Boompala" were released on May 25 and 26, with the first one filmed at the Culture Depot Pavilion, and the second at a quarry in Gyeonggi Province.

== Composition ==
"Boompala" was written by Thom Bridges, Justin Tranter, Score (13), Megatone (13), "Hitman" Bang, JBach, Eren Cannata, Celine Polenghi, Orion Meshorer and Bl$$d, and produced by Bridges, 13 and "Hitman" Bang. It is a Latin house track that incorporates a sample of the song "Macarena" by Los del Río. The song conveys a message of letting go of one's fears instead of "obsessing over what cannot be grasped", through lyrics such as "You can't hold onto the clouds in the air" and "Nothing's forever so nothing's to fear." The lyrics describe using one's fears to drive positive change, expressed with a cheerful energy. The song's title is a made-up word, and its lyrics were inspired by the Buddhist "Heart Sutra" text. "Boompala" was composed in the key of G major with a tempo of 106 beats per minute.

== Music video ==
The music video for "Boompala", directed by 2eehyein, was released on May 22, 2026, and was made as a collaboration with Android and Google Gemini. In the video, the group meditates on a truck covered in horns and speakers moving through the desert, reminiscent of the 2015 film Mad Max: Fury Road, and dance in front of "a giant bank of speakers", incorporating elements of the original "Macarena" dance. The video continues with the members visiting Kim Chaewon, who runs a counseling center in a sauna, and "sublimate their anxiety into joy". In a "vast desert", large golden statues of the members rise out of the sand in meditative poses and lip-sync to the "Macarena" sample as a group of camels "cry out in response". Festival-like sequences follow, with the energy from their performance exploding around the world and into space as the golden statues rain down. At the end of the video, dressed in futuristic outfits, the group dances with a large crowd of people dressed in various costumes.

== Accolades ==
On South Korean music programs, "Boompala" received one first place trophy.

Music program awards for "Boompala"
Program	Date	Ref.
M Countdown	June 4, 2026	

== Track listing ==
Digital download and streaming – Remixes

1. "Boompala" – 2:56
2. "Boompala" (karaoke version) – 2:54
3. "Boompala" (piano version) – 3:43
4. "Boompala" (sped up version) – 1:56
5. "Boompala" (slowed + reverb version) – 5:11
6. "Boompala" (short version) – 2:45
7. "Boompala" (instrumental) – 2:56

Digital download and streaming – Le Sserafim Packages

1. "Boompala" – 2:56
2. "Boompala" (Kim Chaewon version) – 2:44
3. "Boompala" (Sakura version) – 2:33
4. "Boompala" (Huh Yunjin version) – 1:58
5. "Boompala" (Kazuha version) – 2:20
6. "Boompala" (Hong Eunchae version) – 3:40

Digital download and streaming – Champions remix

1. "Boompala" (Champions remix) – 2:21
2. "Boompala" – 2:56

Digital download and streaming – Santos Bravos remix

1. "Boompala" (feat. Santos Bravos) – 3:05
2. "Boompala" – 2:56

Digital download and streaming – Guru Randhawa remix

1. "Boompala" (feat. Guru Randhawa) – 3:05
2. "Boompala" – 2:56

Digital download and streaming – Ayra Starr remix

1. "Boompala" (feat. Ayra Starr) – 2:56
2. "Boompala" – 2:56

== Credits and personnel ==
All credits are adapted from Pureflow Pt. 1 liner notes.

Studios

- Recorded at Hybe Studio (Seoul, South Korea)
- Mixed at Snackworld (Los Angeles, California)
- Mastered at Sterling Sound (Edgewater, New Jersey)

Musicians and technicians

- Le Sserafim – vocals
- Score (13) – production, keyboards, digital editing, vocal arrangement
- Megatone (13) – production, bass, digital editing, vocal arrangement
- Thom Bridges – production, drums, guitar, programming
- Kim Junhyuk – digital editing
- "Hitman" Bang – production
- Hoyeon Kim – background vocals
- Joe LaPorta – mastering
- Tom Norris – mixing
- Victor Verpillat – mixing assistance
- Yang Ha-jeong – recording engineering
- Tak Hyun-gwan – recording engineering
- Lee Sung-hoon – recording engineering
- Lee Dong-geun – recording engineering
- Lee Pyung-ook – recording engineering

== Charts ==
=== Weekly charts ===
Weekly chart performance for "Boompala"
Chart (2026)	Peak position
Global 200 (Billboard)	98
Hong Kong (Billboard)	14
Japan Combined Singles (Oricon)	44
Japan Hot 100 (Billboard)	15
Malaysia International (RIM)	19
Singapore (RIAS)	15
South Korea (Circle)	18
Taiwan (Billboard)	11
UK Singles Sales (OCC)	22
UK Video Streaming (OCC)	91
US Bubbling Under Hot 100 (Billboard)	10

=== Monthly charts ===
Monthly chart performance for "Boompala"
Chart (2026)	Position
South Korea (Circle)	22

== Release history ==
Release history for "Boompala"
Region	Date	Format	Version	Label	Ref
United States	May 22, 2026	CD	Original	Source; Geffen	
Various	May 22, 2026	Digital download; streaming	Original	Source; Geffen	—
Various	May 23, 2026	Digital download; streaming	Remixes	Source; Geffen	
Various	May 25, 2026	Digital download; streaming	Le Sserafim packages	Source; Geffen	
Various	June 3, 2026	Digital download; streaming	Champions remix	Source; Geffen	
Various	June 5, 2026	Digital download; streaming	Santos Bravos remix	Source; Geffen	
Various	June 6, 2026	Digital download; streaming	Guru Randhawa remix	Source; Geffen	
Various	July 24, 2026	Digital download; streaming	Ayra Starr remix	Source; Geffen	
