= Spaghetti (song) =

- Digital cover

Single by Le Sserafim featuring J-Hope

from the album Spaghetti
- Language: Korean; English
- B-side: "Pearlies (My Oyster Is the World)"
- Released: October 24, 2025
- Studio: Hybe Studio (Seoul); DCH Studio (Seoul)
- Genre: Alternative pop; funk-pop
- Length: 2:52
- Label: Source; Geffen
- Songwriters: J-Hope; Score (13); Megatone (13); Annika Bennett; Elle Campbell; JBach; Federico Vindver; Gian Stone; Huh Yunjin; Phil Leigh; Alex Jonathan Crofton Ball; Matt Holmes; Tobias Wincorn; "Hitman" Bang; Sakura; Park Woo-hyun
- Producers: 13; "Hitman" Bang; Federico Vindver; Gian Stone; Tobias Wincorn

Le Sserafim singles chronology
"Different" (2025)	"Spaghetti" (2025)	"Celebration" (2026)

J-Hope singles chronology
"Killin' It Girl" (2025)	"Spaghetti" (2025)

Le Sserafim chronology
Hot (2025)	Spaghetti (2025)	Pureflow Pt. 1 (2026)

Music video
- "Spaghetti" on YouTube

Professional ratings
Review scores
Source	Rating
IZM	2/5 stars

"Spaghetti" is a song by South Korean girl group Le Sserafim featuring South Korean rapper J-Hope of BTS, from the group's first single album of the same name. It was released by Source Music on October 24, 2025, along with its B-side track "Pearlies (My Oyster Is the World)". An alternative pop and funk song, the lyrics compare Le Sserafim to spaghetti stuck in between one's teeth and not being able to get their music out of one's head.

== Background and release ==
During the North American leg of their Easy Crazy Hot Tour in September 2025, Le Sserafim revealed that they would be releasing new music in October. The group teased the release by updating their album covers on streaming platforms with tomato sauce splatters, and posting a video to their YouTube channel titled "It's a Tomato Incident", featuring the members holding plates of spaghetti. On September 29, Source Music announced that Le Sserafim would release their first single album Spaghetti on October 24. Pre-orders for the single album began the following day.

On October 10, the comeback trailer "Eat It Up!" was released on YouTube, featuring the members delivering spaghetti in dream-like spaces with colorful lighting. From October 13-16, concept photos for the Cheeky Neon Pepper (featuring the members standing outside a food truck with bright neon colors), Knocking Basil (with the members dressed as delivery drivers holding boxes of takeout), Weird Garlic (featuring the members holding vegetable in an open-air market), and Compact Bites versions of the single album were released. The track samplers for the title track and B-side were released on October 17. On October 20, a teaser video titled "The Kick" was released, confirming that BTS member J-Hope would be featured on the title track. The video features J-Hope in a "Matrix-like outfit" walking under strobe lights, and ends with all of them singing "Eat it up". The highlight medley and track listing were released on October 21, and the music video teaser for the title track was released on October 22. The single album was released on October 24 alongside the music video for the title track.

== Composition and lyrics ==
"Spaghetti" was written and produced by 13 (Score and Megatone), "Hitman" Bang, Federico Vindver, Gian Stone and Tobias Wincorn, with J-Hope, Annika Bennett, Elle Campbell, JBach, Huh Yunjin, Phil Leigh, Alex Jonathan Crofton Ball, Matt Holmes, Sakura and Park Woo-hyun participating in the writing. It is described as an alternative and funk pop song with a "sophisticated and addictive beat". In the song, Le Sserafim compare themselves to spaghetti stuck in between one's teeth, with lyrics such as "Do you want to take it out, bon appétit" and "Sserafim stuck in your head." In a Q&A about the release, Huh Yunjin said that her work on the song came after their first music show win for "Hot" and thinking: "Like food stuck between our teeth, maybe we've gotten into the public's heads." "Spaghetti" was composed in the key of B major, and has a tempo of 112 beats per minute.

The B-side track, "Pearlies (My Oyster Is the World)", is a rhythmic disco pop song where Le Sserafim expresses gratitude for their fans who have stayed by their side. Huh Yunjin, who co-wrote the song, explained during the Incheon show of their Easy Crazy Hot tour: "Just like the process of a pearl being born, I too will create my own pearl" and that she will "protect the fans who are with [her] through that process." She also said that they flip the meaning of "The World is My Oyster", a song from their first EP, Fearless (2022), from taking ownership of something with a fearless energy, to realizing "within the small oyster I already have, there's everything I need," and that their fans are their oyster.

== Music video ==
The music video for "Spaghetti", directed by Wontae Ko, shows Le Sserafim preparing spaghetti for an eager crowd, representing how they entertain people through their music, and J-Hope delivers his "relaxed rapping" under flashing lights. They perform choreography "wagging their fingers and bouncing their shoulders," dancing on a dinner plate, with moves that visualize the lyric "Spaghetti stuck in your teeth". In an interview with Teen Vogue, Hong Eunchae said that they tried to give the outfits the same feeling through "added elements and textures." The video also features the South Korean drag performers Nana Youngrong Kim, Kyam, and RingRing.

== Friday Night Funkin' collaboration ==
On January 3, 2026, the rhythm game Friday Night Funkin' was updated to include "Spaghetti" as a playable song, as part of an official collaboration with Le Sserafim. The game's main protagonists, Boyfriend and Girlfriend, are seen performing the song with Le Sserafim. J-Hope is physically absent; his lines are instead performed by Boyfriend.

== Accolades ==
On South Korean music programs, "Spaghetti" won a first place trophy on the November 23, 2025 episode of Inkigayo.

Accolades
Award/Organization	Year	Category	Result	Ref.
MAMA Awards	2026	Best Dance Performance - Female Group	Pending	
MAMA Awards	2026	Best Collaboration	Pending	
MTV Video Music Awards	2026	Best K-Pop	Nominated	
Music Awards Japan	2026	International Song powered by Spotify	Nominated	
SEC Awards	2026	International Feat of the Year	Won	
Seoul Music Awards	2026	Best Song	Won	

== Track listing ==
Spaghetti track listing
No.	Title	Writer(s)	Producer(s)	Length
1.	"Spaghetti" (featuring J-Hope of BTS)	J-Hope; Score (13); Megatone (13); Annika Bennett; Elle Campbell; JBach; Federico Vindver; Gian Stone; Huh Yunjin; Phil Leigh; Alex Jonathan Crofton Ball; Matt Holmes; Tobias Wincorn; "Hitman" Bang; Sakura; Park Woo-hyun	13; "Hitman" Bang; Federico Vindver; Gian Stone; Tobias Wincorn	2:52
2.	"Pearlies (My Oyster Is the World)"	Maize; 444Boy; Sofia Kay; Huh Yunjin	444Boy	3:08
Total length:				6:00

Spaghetti digital edition track listing
No.	Title	Writer(s)	Producer(s)	Length
3.	"Spaghetti" (Member version)	Score (13); Megatone (13); Anika Bennet; Elle Campbell; JBach; Federico Vindver; Gian Stone; Huh Yunjin; Phil Leigh; Alex Jonathan Crofton Ball; Matt Holmes; Tobias Wincorn; "Hitman" Bang; Sakura; Park Woo-hyun	13; "Hitman" Bang; Federico Vindver; Gian Stone; Tobias Wincorn	2:16
4.	"Spaghetti" (featuring J-Hope of BTS; English version)	J-Hope; Score (13); Megatone (13); Anika Bennet; Elle Campbell; JBach; Federico Vindver; Gian Stone; Huh Yunjin; Phil Leigh; Alex Jonathan Crofton Ball; Matt Holmes; Tobias Wincorn; "Hitman" Bang; Sakura; Park Woo-hyun	13; "Hitman" Bang; Federico Vindver; Gian Stone; Tobias Wincorn	2:52
Total length:				11:08

=== Notes ===
- "Pearlies (My Oyster Is the World)" is stylized as "Pearlies (My oyster is the world)".
- The digital edition of Spaghetti also includes the clean versions of the first four tracks as tracks 5–8.

== Personnel ==
Credits adapted from the album liner notes.

- Le Sserafim – vocals
- J-Hope – vocals (track 1)
- Score (13) – production, drums (track 1); vocal arrangements
- Megatone (13) – production, synthesizer (track 1); vocal arrangements
- Federico Vindver – production, drums, synthesizer (track 1)
- Gian Stone – production (track 1)
- "Hitman" Bang – production (track 1)
- Tobias Wincorn – production (track 1)
- Kim Jun-hyuk – digital editing; vocal arrangements (track 2)
- Anika Bennett – background vocals (track 1)
- Elle Campbell – background vocals (track 1)
- 444Boy – production, drums, bass, guitar, keyboards (track 2)
- Sofia Kay – background vocals (track 2)
- Serban Ghenea – mixing (track 1)
- Bryce Bordone – assistant mixing (track 1)
- Kevin Grainger – mixing (track 2)
- Mike Bozzi – mastering (track 1)
- Joe LaPorta – mastering (track 2)
- Song Chan-young – recording, engineering
- Lee Pyeong-ook – recording, engineering (track 1)
- Kim Soo-jeong – recording, engineering
- Hwang Min-hee – recording, engineering (track 1)
- Lee Sung-hoon – recording, engineering (track 2)
- Min Ji-hwan – recording, engineering (track 2)
- Kim Jun-sang – recording, engineering (track 2)

== Charts ==
=== Weekly charts ===
Weekly chart performance for "Spaghetti"
Chart (2025–2026)	Peak position
Brazil Hot 100 (Billboard)	72
Canada Hot 100 (Billboard)	49
Chile Anglo Airplay (Monitor Latino)	12
Global 200 (Billboard)	6
Hong Kong (Billboard)	3
Indonesia (Billboard)	23
India International (IMI)	1
Ireland (IRMA)	81
Japan (Japan Hot 100)	3
Japan (Oricon)	1
Japan Combined Singles (Oricon)	2
Malaysia (IFPI)	8
Malaysia International (RIM)	4
Netherlands (Single Tip)	5
New Zealand Hot Singles (RMNZ)	6
Peru (Billboard)	20
Philippines (Philippines Hot 100)	21
Portugal (AFP)	108
Singapore (RIAS)	5
South Korea (Circle)	5
South Korean Albums (Circle)	3
South Korea Hot 100 (Billboard)	9
Taiwan (Billboard)	4
UK Singles (Official Charts)	46
UK Indie (Official Charts)	24
UK Album Downloads (Official Charts)	82
US Billboard Hot 100	50
US World Digital Song Sales (Billboard)	1
Vietnam Hot 100 (Billboard)	70

=== Monthly charts ===
Monthly chart performance for "Spaghetti"
Chart (2025)	Position
Japan (Oricon)	6
South Korea (Circle)	6
South Korean Albums (Circle)	7

=== Year-end charts ===
Year-end chart performance for "Spaghetti"
Chart (2025)	Position
Japan Top Singles Sales (Billboard Japan)	76
Japan (Oricon)	63
South Korea (Circle)	147
South Korean Albums (Circle)	40

== Certifications ==
Certifications for "Spaghetti"
Region	Certification	Certified units/sales
South Korea (KMCA) Physical	2× Platinum	500,000^{^}
Japan (RIAJ) Physical	Gold	100,000^{^}
^{^} Shipments figures based on certification alone.

== Release history ==
Release history for "Spaghetti"
Region	Date	Format	Version	Label	Ref.
Various	October 24, 2025	Digital download; streaming	Original	Source; Geffen	
United States	October 24, 2025	CD single	Original	Source; Geffen	
United States	October 24, 2025	CD	Original	Source; Geffen	
South Korea	October 24, 2025	CD	Original	Source; YG Plus	
Various	October 31, 2025	Digital download; streaming	Bon Appétit Remixes	Source; Geffen	
Various	January 30, 2026	Vinyl LP	Original	Source; YG Plus	
