= Celebration (Le Sserafim song) =

- Digital cover

Single by Le Sserafim

from the album Pureflow Pt. 1
- Language: Korean; English
- Released: April 24, 2026
- Genre: Techno; hardstyle
- Length: 2:33
- Label: Source; Geffen
- Songwriters: Supreme Boi; Aino Jawo; Caroline Hjelt; Louice Hellström; Matilda Winberg; Pär Almqvist; "Hitman" Bang; Alexis Duvivier; Victor Cossement; Kim Chaewon; Score (13); Megatone (13); JBach; Dannie Fite; Softest Hard; Huh Yunjin; Young Chance
- Producers: Softest Hard; Pär Almqvist; 13; "Hitman" Bang; Alexis Duvivier; Victor Cossement; Dannie Fite

Le Sserafim singles chronology
"Spaghetti" (2025)	"Celebration" (2026)	"Boompala" (2026)

Music video
- "Celebration" on YouTube

Professional ratings
Review scores
Source	Rating
IZM	2/5 stars

"Celebration" is a song by South Korean girl group Le Sserafim, released on April 24, 2026, by Source Music as the lead single for the group's second studio album, Pureflow Pt. 1 (2026). A techno and hardstyle song, "Celebration" describes the moment when one gains the strength to face their fears.

== Background ==
On March 5, 2026, it was reported by Daily Sports that Le Sserafim would release a new song in late April. On April 8, the group posted a teaser video to their YouTube channel titled "A congratulatory delegation emerges...", and shared an Instagram post with the hashtag "#TimeToCelebrate". On April 13, Source Music announced that Le Sserafim would release their second studio album, Pureflow Pt. 1, on May 22, 2026, with the lead single "Celebration" to be released on April 24. A teaser video titled "Celebration Begins" was released on April 20, and the music video teaser for "Celebration" was released on April 22. The song was released on April 24 alongside its music video. A dance performance film for "Celebration" was released on April 30. On May 7, Google unveiled a doodle campaign to celebrate Asian American and Pacific Islander Heritage Month, with "Celebration" featured as the background music for the campaign's animation. A remix of "Celebration" made in collaboration with the 2026 film Supergirl was released on May 31; the remix will be included in Asian versions of the film.

== Composition ==
"Celebration" was written and produced by Softest Hard, Pär Almqvist, 13 (Score and Megatone), "Hitman" Bang, Alexis Duvivier, Victor Cossement, and Dannie Fite, with Supreme Boi, Aino Jawo, Caroline Hjelt, Louice Hellström, Matilda Winberg, Kim Chaewon, JBach, Huh Yunjin and Young Chance participating in the writing. It is a melodic techno and hardstyle song with an intense beat and addictive melody. Its lyrics describe the moment when one gains the strength to face their fears, celebrating that you are still here after everything you've been through. "Celebration" was composed in the key of C-sharp minor with a tempo of 150 beats per minute.

== Music video ==
The music video for "Celebration", directed by Soonsik Yang, features the members dancing amongst a crowd of monsters who run through deserts and snowfields, and they perform headbanging choreography with sharp movements, as they sing the lyric "Time to celebrate". The members also have "unconventional visual transformations", including eyebrow piercings and green eye makeup. The story of the video depicts a creature who conceals its identity and is chased by the members through various locations until they reveal that they also possess features different from ordinary people. They then join hands and party together with various other creatures as a "hymn to those who are different."

== Promotion ==
Before the song's announcement, Le Sserafim encouraged fans to share everyday achievements to celebrate and posted videos celebrating various things, such as the Doosan Bears' victory, while changing their profile pictures across social media to "convey a sense of 'Congratulations'." Following the song's release, the group performed at the Inkigayo On the Go festival in Incheon.

== Controversies and incidents ==
During the promotional cycle for "Celebration", Source Music released an official statement on May 19, 2026, confirming that Le Sserafim member Kim Chaewon had sought medical treatment due to neck pain. Following medical advice to rest and monitor her recovery, the company decided to temporarily suspend all her scheduled activities. Consequently, she was absent from the group's university festival performances as well as promotional activities for the song on music broadcasting shows.

The injury drew significant attention, with many South Korean media outlets and fans attributing the primary cause to an intense headbanging sequence in the song's choreography. According to media reports and fan-taken fancams, this controversial movement had already been quietly removed or significantly simplified as early as the May 15 university festival stage—prior to the official announcement of her hiatus. Observers noted that Kim Chaewon's physical movements and neck rotations appeared visibly stiff and uncomfortable during the performance. Subsequently, some fans sent funerary wreaths to the agency's building in protest, accusing the company of enforcing dangerous choreography that could jeopardize the artists' cervical spine, and demanded a permanent modification to the choreography to protect the safety of the remaining members. Following Chaewon's absence, the controversial headbanging sequence was completely removed from all subsequent live performances of "Celebration" on music comeback stages. It was replaced with milder freezes and formation movements, indicating that the agency had effectively altered the choreography structure in response to public backlash.

Additionally, controversies intensified regarding the agency's alleged attempt to conceal her medical condition during the song's promotional period. Netizens surfaced a clip from the group's fourth-anniversary live broadcast on May 2, in which Chaewon mentioned that her "neck hurts," only to be immediately gestured to stay quiet with a "shush" sign by fellow member Sakura Miyawaki, leading Chaewon to recant and say she was fine. While fans initially dismissed this as a playful spoiler for the upcoming release, the confirmation of her injury led many fans and netizens to strongly question whether Source Music disregarded the artist's health for the sake of the track's promotions and ordered members to hide their physical ailments. This incident triggered widespread condemnation on social media platforms targeting the agency for poor management and an alleged attempt to "silence" the artist.

== Track listing ==
CD, digital download and streaming

1. "Celebration" – 2:33

Digital download and streaming – Remixes

1. "Celebration" – 2:33
2. "Celebration" (sped up version) – 1:54
3. "Celebration" (slowed + reverb version) – 3:49
4. "Celebration" (instrumental) – 2:32
5. "Celebration" (karaoke version) – 2:32

Digital download and streaming – Sara Landry remix

1. "Celebration" (Sara Landry remix) – 4:21

Digital download and streaming – Supergirl version

1. "Celebration" (Supergirl version) – 2:44
2. "Celebration" – 2:33

== Personnel ==
All credits are adapted from Pureflow Pt.1 liner notes.

- Le Sserafim – vocals, background vocals
- Softest Hard – production, keyboards
- Dannie Fite — production, drums
- Score (13) – production, bass, digital editing, vocal arrangements
- Megatone (13) – production, guitar, digital editing, vocal arrangements
- Pär Almqvist — production
- "Hitman" Bang — production
- Alexis Duvivier — production
- Victor Cossement – production
- Marti Bresso – mixing
- Joe LaPorta – mastering
- Lee Dong-geun – recording
- Yang Ha-jeong – recording
- Lee Sung-hoon – recording

== Charts ==
=== Weekly charts ===
Weekly chart performance
Chart (2026)	Peak position
Global Excl. US (Billboard)	170
Hong Kong (Billboard)	24
Japan Digital Singles (Oricon)	31
Japan Hot 100 (Billboard)	29
New Zealand Hot Singles (RMNZ)	17
Singapore Regional (RIAS)	20
South Korea (Circle)	106
Taiwan (Billboard)	21
UK Singles Sales (OCC)	62
US Hot Dance/Pop Songs (Billboard)	12
US World Digital Song Sales (Billboard)	2

=== Monthly charts ===
Monthly chart performance
Chart (2026)	Peak position
Russia Streaming (TopHit)	97
South Korea (Circle)	113

== Release history ==
Release history for "Celebration"
Region	Date	Format	Version	Label	Ref
Various	April 24, 2026	Digital download; streaming	Original	Source; Geffen	
United States	April 24, 2026	CD	Original	Source; Geffen	
Various	April 25, 2026	Digital download; streaming	Remixes	Source; Geffen	
Various	May 6, 2026	Digital download; streaming	Sara Landry remix	Source; Geffen	
Various	May 31, 2026	Digital download; streaming	Supergirl version	Source; Geffen	
