= 1-800-Hot-N-Fun =

Song by Le Sserafim

from the EP Crazy
- Released: August 30, 2024
- Genre: Rap rock
- Length: 2:53
- Label: Source; Geffen
- Songwriters: BloodPop; Omer Fedi; AOBeats; Mark Johns; "Hitman" Bang; Score (13); Megatone (13)
- Producers: BloodPop; AOBeats

Official audio
- "1-800-Hot-N-Fun" on YouTube

"1-800-Hot-N-Fun" (stylized in all lowercase) is a song by the South Korean girl group Le Sserafim. The song debuted live at the group's Coachella 2024 set, and was later officially released on group's fourth extended play, Crazy, on August 30, 2024.

== Background ==
On April 14, 2024, Le Sserafim performed a set at the Sahara stage on day two of Coachella 2024, which included the debut of "1-800-Hot-N-Fun" with a dance break. Billboard called it "an uptempo highlight" of the group's ten-song set list. The group later performed the song as part of their 2024 "Fearnada" fan meeting events held across South Korea and Japan.

In August 2024, it was revealed that "1-800-Hot-N-Fun" would be formally released with Le Sserafim's upcoming comeback. On August 30, Le Sserafim released their fourth extended play, Crazy, which included "1-800-Hot-N-Fun" as the fourth track in its track listing. The song was co-produced by American musician BloodPop.

Following the release of Crazy, Le Sserafim performed "1-800-Hot-N-Fun," alongside "Crazy," at the 2024 MTV Video Music Awards pre-show on September 11, 2024.

== Critical reception ==
In a list of the 25 best K-pop songs of 2024, NME listed "1-800-Hot-N-Fun" in ninth place: "This flirty hot-girl anthem packages cheeky dialogue with a jolting electric guitar riff that anchors the chorus." The song performed well on streaming services and reached over 100 million streams on Spotify by November 2025.

== Personnel ==
Credits adapted from Tidal.

- Le Sserafim – vocals
- BloodPop – production, bass, drums, keyboards
- AOBeats – production, bass, drums, keyboards
- Omer Fedi – guitar
- Score (13) – keyboards, digital editing, vocal arrangement
- Megatone (13) – guitar, digital editing, vocal arrangement
- Mark Johns – background vocals
- Kim Jun-hyeok – vocal arrangement
- Austin Seltzer – mixing
- Chris Gehringer – mastering
- Kim Min-jun – recording engineering
- Lee Pyeong-ook – recording engineering
- Hwang Min-hee – recording engineering

== Charts ==
=== Weekly charts ===
Weekly chart performance for "1-800-Hot-N-Fun"
Chart (2024)	Peak position
New Zealand Hot Singles (RMNZ)	8
Singapore (RIAS)	26
South Korea Download (Circle)	20

=== Monthly charts ===
Monthly chart performance for "1-800-Hot-N-Fun"
Chart (2024)	Peak position
South Korea Download (Circle)	77
