= Le Sserafim =

South Korean girl group

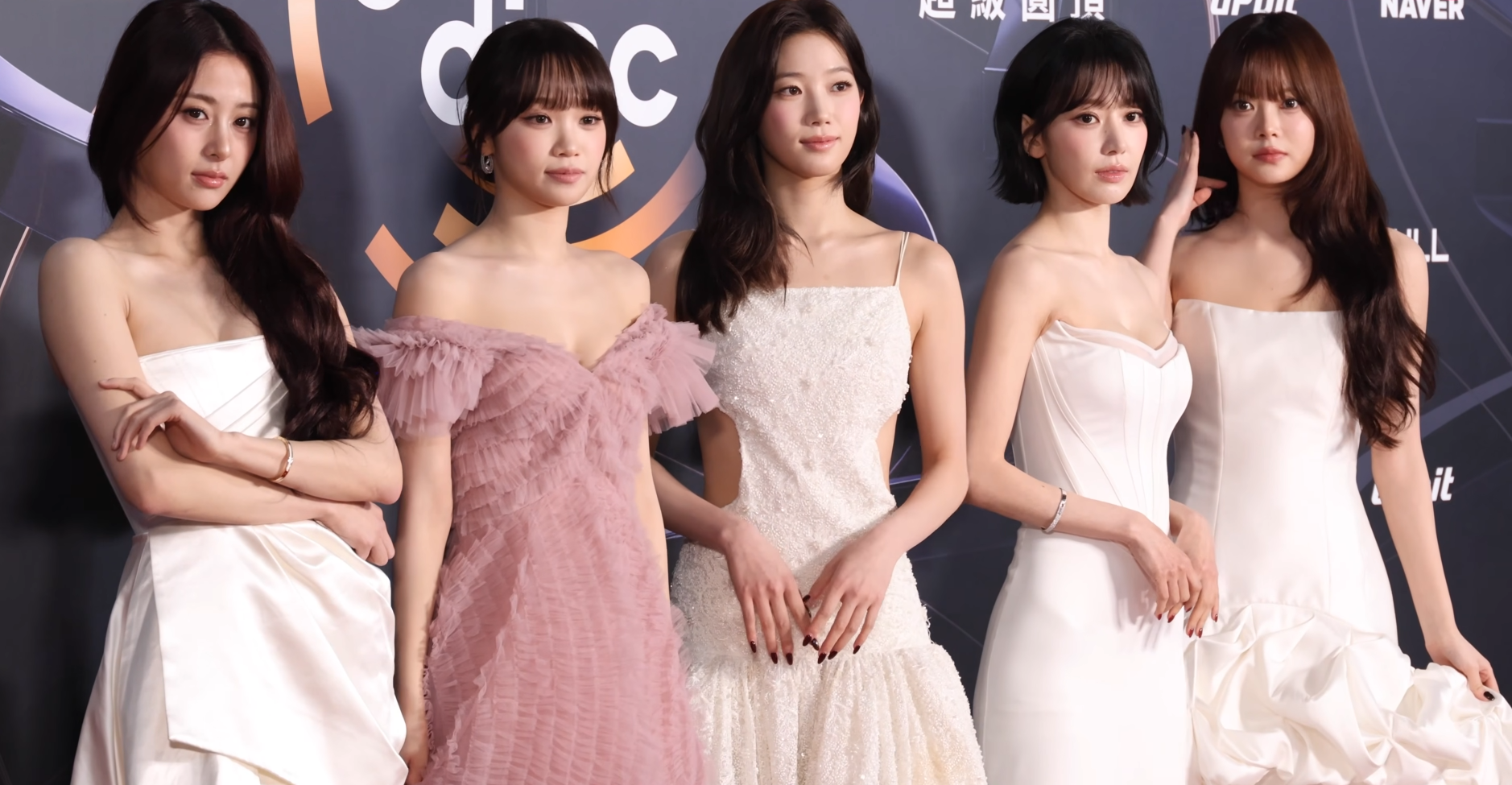
- Le Sserafim in January 2026; L–R: Huh Yunjin, Kim Chaewon, Kazuha, Sakura, and Hong Eunchae

Background information
- Origin: Seoul, South Korea
- Genre: K-pop
- Years active: 2022–present
- Labels: Source; EMI/Universal Japan; Geffen
- Members: Sakura; Kim Chaewon; Huh Yunjin; Kazuha; Hong Eunchae
- Past members: Kim Garam
- Website: sourcemusic.com/le_sserafim

Le Sserafim (/lə ˈsɛrəfɪm/ lə SERR-ə-fim; Korean: 르세라핌, Japanese: ル セラフィム; stylized in all caps) is a South Korean girl group formed by Source Music, a sub-label of Hybe. The group consists of five members: Sakura Miyawaki, Kim Chaewon, Huh Yunjin, Kazuha, and Hong Eunchae. Le Sserafim was originally a six-member ensemble; Kim Garam departed from the group in July 2022.

Le Sserafim debuted on May 2, 2022, with the extended play Fearless. It was followed in October with their second extended play, Antifragile, which became the group's first release to sell over a million copies and made them the fastest K-pop girl group to debut on the US Billboard 200 at the time. Both EPs' lead singles reached the top ten of South Korea's Circle Digital Chart and were certified platinum for streaming in South Korea and Japan.

Le Sserafim's first studio album, Unforgiven (2023), marked their first number-one album on the Circle Album Chart and their first top-ten album on the Billboard 200. The album's singles "Unforgiven" and "Eve, Psyche & the Bluebeard's Wife" peaked at number two in South Korea and were certified gold for streaming in Japan. The group's first English single "Perfect Night" (2023) became their first number-one song on the Circle Digital Chart, topping the chart for six weeks. They achieved further success with the extended plays Easy, Crazy, and Hot, all of which debuted in the top ten on the Billboard 200, and the Easy Crazy Hot Tour (2025–2026), which became one of the highest-grossing K-pop tours of 2025.

== History ==
=== 2011–2021: Pre-debut activities ===
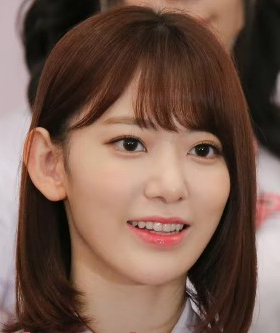
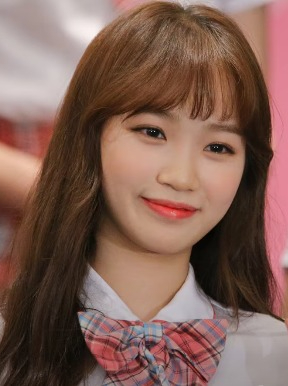
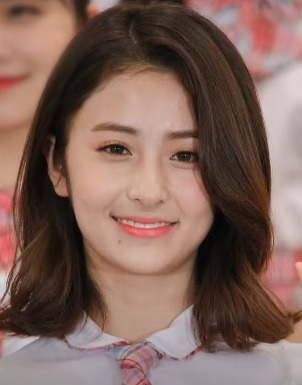
From left to right: Sakura, Chaewon, and Yunjin during Produce 48 in 2018

Member Sakura Miyawaki made her acting debut in the movie Ano Hito Ano Hi in 2011. That year, she joined the Japanese idol group HKT48 as a first generation trainee. She was promoted to a full member of HKT48 Team H in 2012 and transferred to HKT48 Team KIV in 2014. After being with the group for 10 years, Sakura officially graduated on June 27, 2021.

Sakura, Kim Chaewon and Huh Yunjin participated in the reality competition series Produce 48 in 2018. Yunjin represented Pledis Entertainment, which at the time was not owned by Hybe Corporation, Source Music's parent company, while Chaewon represented Woollim Entertainment, her former label. After finishing in second and tenth place, respectively, Sakura and Chaewon were named to the final lineup of the show's project girl group Iz*One, and promoted as members until its disbandment on April 29, 2021. Yunjin finished in 26th place and was eliminated in episode 11.

Prior to joining the group, Kazuha trained as a professional ballerina. After passing an audition, she was personally scouted by Big Hit Music founder Bang Si-hyuk during her studies at Dutch National Ballet Academy in the Netherlands. Kazuha also previously attended the Bolshoi Academy in Moscow, Russia and the Royal Ballet School in the United Kingdom.

Hong Eunchae was a student at Def Dance School for two years. She previously auditioned for JYP Entertainment and Pledis Entertainment before joining Source Music in 2021.

=== 2022: Fearless, Kim Garam's departure, and Antifragile ===
On March 14, Source Music announced that they would launch a new girl group, with Miyawaki Sakura and Kim Chaewon set to be the first members. On March 21, Hybe confirmed the group would officially debut in May. The group's name was revealed to be "Le Sserafim" on March 28; the name is an anagram of the phrase "I'm Fearless" as well as a reference to the heavenly beings with six wings, seraphim. The members were revealed in "The First Moment of Le Sserafim" teasers from April 4 to April 9 (in order: Sakura, Kim Garam, Hong Eunchae, Kim Chaewon, Kazuha, and Huh Yunjin). On April 13, Source Music announced that Le Sserafim would release their debut extended play (EP), Fearless, on May 2. Pre-orders for the EP surpassed 270,000 copies in seven days and 380,000 copies in sixteen days. On May 10, eight days after their debut, the group earned their first music show win on SBS MTV's The Show.

Le Sserafim's official logo

Prior to the group's debut, Kim Garam became a subject of controversy. She was accused of bullying other students at her middle school and engaging in underage smoking and drinking. Hybe Corporation denied the allegations, claiming that Kim was the victim, not the perpetrator of bullying. They expressed that they would take legal action against those who spread false rumors, and Kim was not removed from the debut lineup. On May 20, Hybe Corporation and Source Music issued a joint statement regarding Kim Garam's bullying allegations, announcing that she would take a hiatus due to the pending investigations and that Le Sserafim would temporarily promote as a five-member group. On July 20, the companies announced that Kim Garam would depart from the group and that her contract had been terminated, with Le Sserafim to continue as a five-member group.

Le Sserafim released their second EP, Antifragile, on October 17. It marked their first release as five members, following Kim Garam's departure. The album reached number 14 on the Billboard 200, making Le Sserafim the fastest K-pop girl group to debut on the chart. On November 24, Hybe released a webtoon, titled Crimson Heart, based on the group's message to "advance without fear" through the platform Webtoon.

=== 2023: Japanese debut and Unforgiven ===
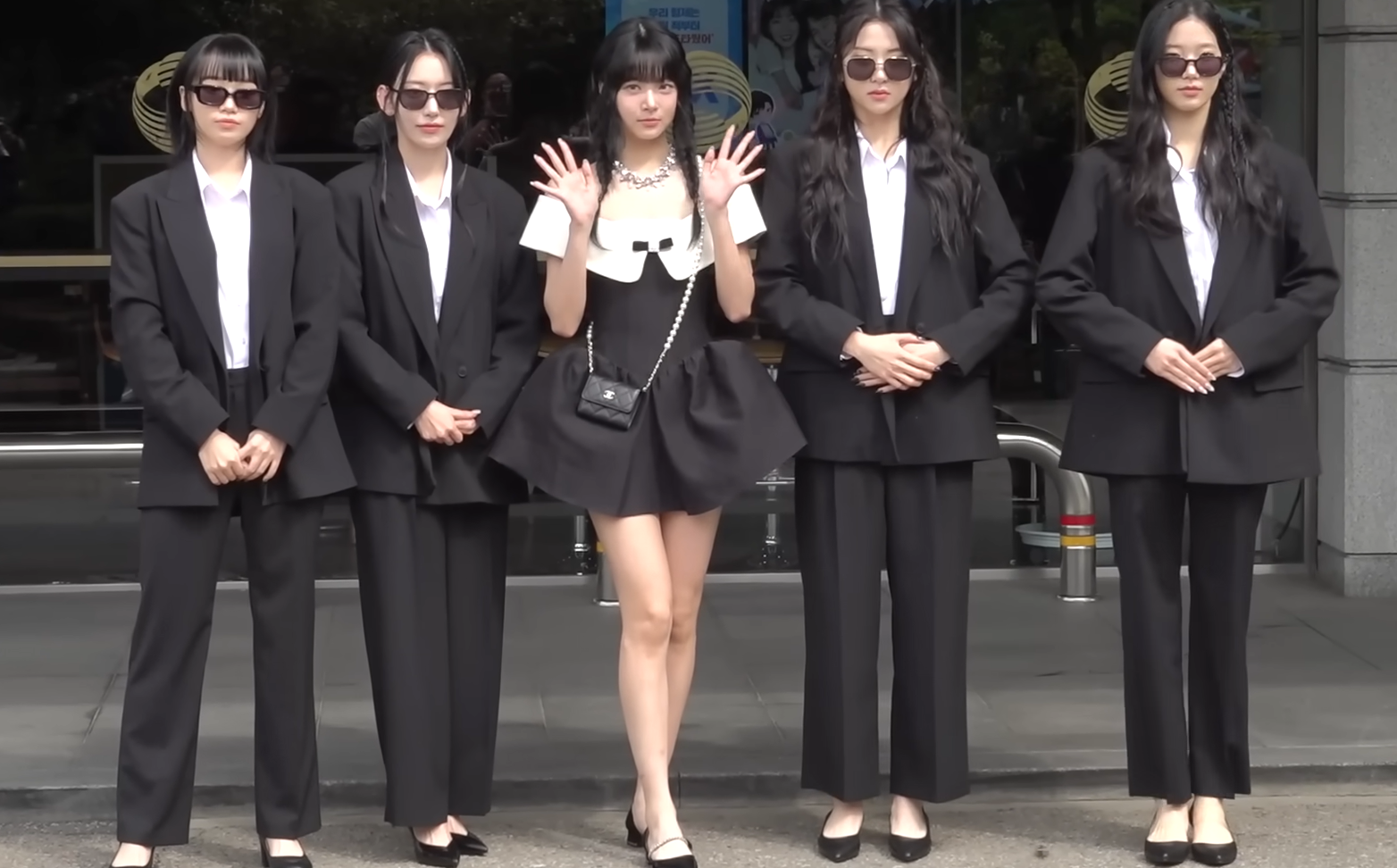
Le Sserafim in May 2023

On January 25, 2023, Le Sserafim made their debut in Japan with the release of the Japanese single "Fearless". It contained Japanese versions of "Fearless" and "Blue Flame", along with an original Japanese song, "Choices", which served as the theme song for the Japanese drama 3000 Yen: How to Enrich Life. On March 16, 2023, Source Music reported that Le Sserafim would be making a comeback in early May. On April 3, they announced their first studio album, Unforgiven, which was released on May 1. In June, it was announced the group would embark on their first concert tour, the Flame Rises Tour, beginning in August. On July 25, the group released their second original Japanese song "Jewelry" from their second Japanese single, "Unforgiven". The single, released on August 23, also featured Japanese versions of "Unforgiven" and "Antifragile".

On October 12, Source Music announced that the group would release their first English-language digital single, "Perfect Night" on October 27 in collaboration with Blizzard Entertainment to promote Overwatch 2. An in-game event featuring cosmetics and game modes themed after the group ran from November 1 to November 20. The group performed at BlizzCon on November 4. On November 19, the group released "Dresscode", which served as the theme song for the Japanese live-action television series adaptation of the manga series Sexy Tanaka-san.

=== 2024: Easy, Coachella and Crazy ===
On January 22, 2024, it was confirmed that Le Sserafim would release their third EP, Easy, on February 19. It debuted at number 8 on the Billboard 200 simultaneously with Twice's EP With You-th at number 1, which marked the first week where two all-female K-pop acts were featured in the top 10. The lead single of the same name debuted at number 99 on the Billboard Hot 100, marking the group's first entry on the list. The English versions of the lead single and "Smart" were released on February 23 and March 22, respectively. In April 2024, the group performed at Coachella with Nile Rodgers, where they debuted a new song titled "1-800-Hot-N-Fun". The group confirmed in late June 2024 that a comeback was scheduled for release in August. On July 10, the music-themed Grammy Museum in Los Angeles, California announced that a special K-pop exhibit would take place in August 2024, displaying accessories and performance gear worn by artists under Hybe, including Illit, Le Sserafim, Fromis 9, and BTS.

On August 5, it was announced that Le Sserafim would be releasing their fourth EP, Crazy, on August 30. The English version and various remixes for the lead single of the same name, including a collaboration with American performer Dashaun Wesley, were released on September 2. On September 4, a lead single remix featuring English singer PinkPantheress was released, followed by another lead single remix with French producer David Guetta on September 9. On September 11, Le Sserafim performed "Crazy" and "1-800-Hot-N-Fun" at their first-ever MTV Video Music Awards and won the PUSH Performance of the Year award for "Easy".

In October, Le Sserafim announced that their third Japanese single "Crazy" would be released on December 11. On November 10, the group made their first appearance at the MTV Europe Music Awards with a performance of "Chasing Lightning" and "Crazy". They were also nominated for three awards: Best Push, Best New, and Best K-pop; they won Best Push. On November 12, the group released the song "Star Signs", which doubled as a pre-release track for the single and a campaign song for the Japanese brand Lumine.

=== 2025–present: Hot, world tours and Pureflow Pt. 1 ===
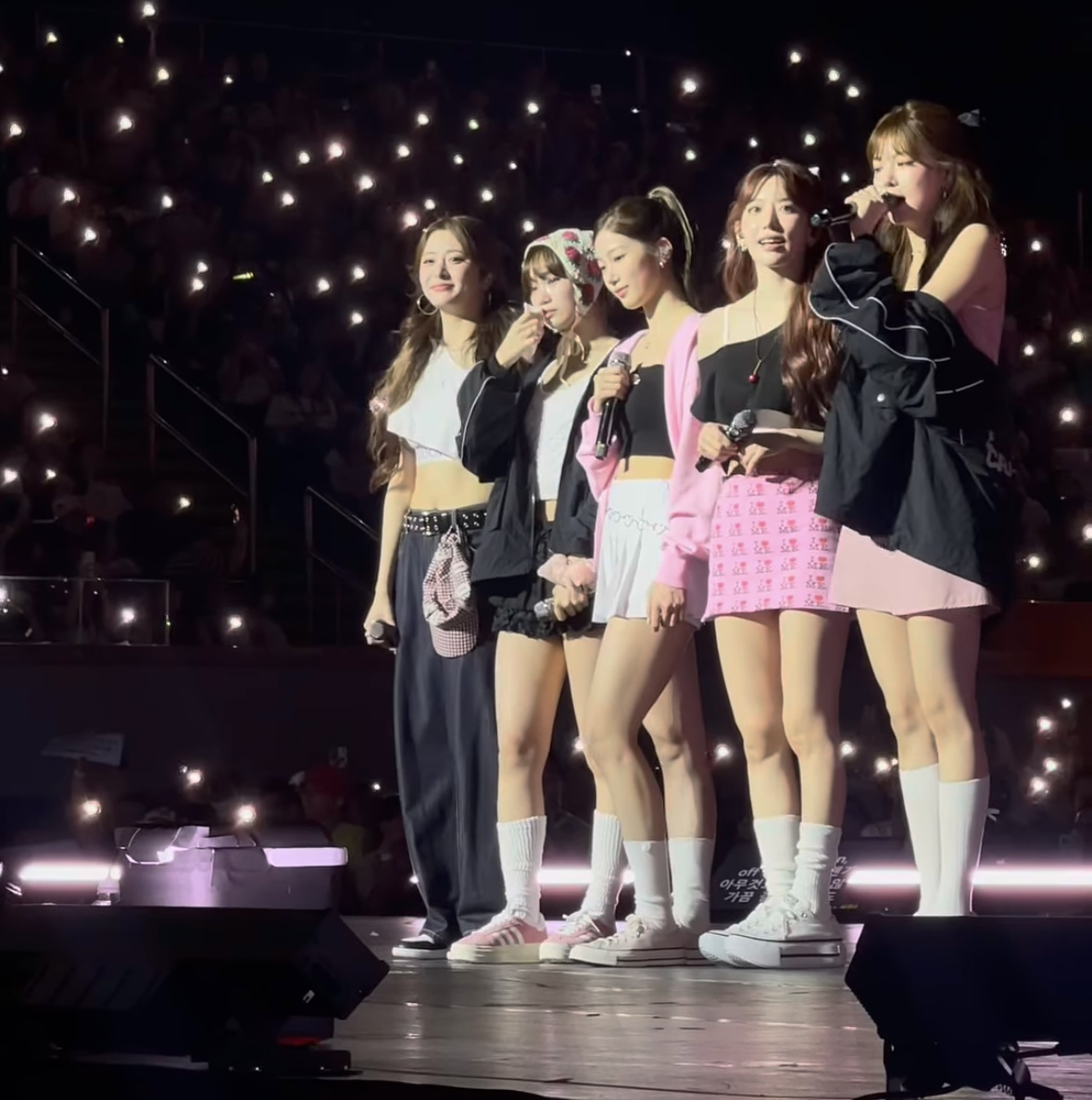
Le Sserafim during their Easy Crazy Hot Tour in Manila in August 2025

On February 17, 2025, it was announced that Le Sserafim's fifth extended play, Hot, would be released on March 14. The English version and various remixes of the lead single of the same name were released on March 17. On February 28, the group announced that they would be embarking on their first world tour, the Easy Crazy Hot Tour, which began in Incheon on April 19. The tour was positively received worldwide (Note: Supported by multiple sources:) and was a commercial success, grossing $34.1 million and becoming one of the top 10 highest-grossing K-pop tours of 2025.

In April, it was announced that Le Sserafim would be releasing their fourth Japanese single "Different" on June 24. On September 5, they were confirmed as guest performers on the fourth quarterfinal results show of the twentieth season of America's Got Talent. That same month, they collaborated with Japanese duo Yoasobi for the song "The Noise", containing a sample of the duo's single "Yoru ni Kakeru", to commemorate the 20th anniversary of fashion e-commerce website Zozotown, and also announced their plan to release new music in October. On October 24, Le Sserafim released their first single album Spaghetti. On December 31, the group performed in Times Square as part of the Dick Clark's New Year's Rockin' Eve television special.

On May 22, 2026, Le Sserafim released their second studio album titled Pureflow Pt. 1, alongside the album's main track and second single "Boompala". The lead single "Celebration" was pre-released on April 24. On April 28, Source Music announced Le Sserafim's second world tour, the Pureflow Tour. The tour began on July 11 at the Inspire Arena in Incheon, South Korea, and would span 32 shows across 23 cities, including the group's first-ever solo concerts in Europe. On June 8, it was announced that Le Sserafim would be releasing the single "Iconic by Mistake" in collaboration with Hybe label mates Illit and Katseye on June 12, marking the first time these three Hybe girl groups have released music together. Le Sserafim released their second single album Made My Night on September 11.

== Other ventures ==
=== Endorsements ===
In March 2023, Le Sserafim were revealed to be Vita 500 Zero models. In May, the group joined as models for Goobne. On October 13, French luxury fashion house Louis Vuitton announced that Le Sserafim would join the maison as house ambassadors. Their debut act places Le Sserafim in a campaign for a bag capsule exclusive to the South Korean market, against a visual backdrop of Jamsugyo Bridge. In April 2024, the five members were dressed in custom-made outfits designed by Louis Vuitton's Nicolas Ghesquière for their Coachella debut.

On June 3, 2024, Jim Beam launched a global campaign called "Enjoy it, our way!" with Le Sserafim. In August, the group was selected as the new advertising models for fast food chain Mom's Touch. In September, Sony selected Le Sserafim as their global ambassador, and the group also became the global ambassador for Gelato Pique. That same month, after the release of Crazy, Le Sserafim collaborated with the Make-A-Wish Foundation and the Empire State Building to light up the building up in "fearless blue". Starting in November, the Japanese brand Lumine scheduled a 2024 Christmas campaign with Le Sserafim. The campaign includes the song "Star Signs", which was released on November 12, as well as a merchandise raffle, a pop-up shop in Lumine's Shinjuku location, and original visuals directed by Yuni Yoshida. In late November, Le Sserafim became the new official advertising models for Indeed in Japan, and a series of TV commercials featuring the group have been broadcast in Japan. In March 2025, Blizzard Entertainment announced that they were going to collaborate with Le Sserafim for the second time to promote Overwatch 2, adding new in-game cosmetics based on the group. In January 2026, a collaboration with the rhythm game Friday Night Funkin' was released, featuring the single "Spaghetti" as a playable track alongside animated avatars of the group singing the song.

=== Philanthropy ===
In March 2025, Le Sserafim donated 50 million KRW to the Hope Bridge National Disaster Relief Association for wildfire relief efforts from wildfires in Ulsan, Gyeongbuk, and Gyeongnam regions.

== Members ==
=== Current ===
- Sakura Miyawaki (미야와키 사쿠라) (宮脇咲良)
- Kim Chaewon (김채원) – leader
- Huh Yunjin (허윤진)
- Kazuha Nakamura (나카무라 카즈하) (中村一葉)
- Hong Eunchae (홍은채)

=== Former ===
- Kim Garam (김가람) (2022)

=== Timeline ===
From May to June 2026, Kim Chaewon suspended activities to recover from a neck injury.

== Discography ==
- Unforgiven (2023)
- Pureflow Pt. 1 (2026)

== Videography ==
=== Music videos ===
List of music videos, showing year released, and name of the director(s)
Title	Year	Director(s)	Ref.
"Fearless"	2022	Guzza (Kudo)	
"Antifragile"	2022	Soonsik Yang	
"Impurities"	2022	Jihye Yoon (Lumpens)	
"Fearless" (Japanese ver.)	2023	Soonsik Yang	
"Unforgiven" (featuring Nile Rodgers)	2023	Soonsik Yang	
"Eve, Psyche & the Bluebeard's Wife"	2023	Jihye Yoon (Lumpens)	
"Unforgiven" (Japanese ver.) (featuring Nile Rodgers, Ado)	2023	Soonsik Yang	
"Perfect Night"	2023	Woogie Kim	
"Easy"	2024	Nina McNeely	
"Smart"	2024	Yong Seok Choi (Lumpens)	
"Crazy"	2024	Yunah Sheep	
"Crazy" (English ver.)	2024	Guzza (Kudo)	
"Crazy" (Japanese ver.)	2024	Jaeyeob Bang	
"Hot"	2025	Yunah Sheep	
"Come Over"	2025	Jeon Moonyong (Backroom)	
"Different"	2025	Minjae Kim	
"Kawaii"	2025	Yoshihiro Nagano (Sanjukudo)	
"Spaghetti" (featuring J-Hope of BTS)	2025	Wontae Go	
"The Noise" (with Yoasobi)	2025	Unknown	
"Celebration"	2026	Soonsik Yang	
"Boompala"	2026	2eehyein	
"Iconic by Mistake" (with Illit and Katseye)	2026	Cody Critcheloe	
"Made My Night"	2026	Hattrick	

=== Other videos ===
List of other videos, showing year released, and name of the director(s)
Title	Year	Director(s)	Ref.
"Fearless Trailer 'The World Is My Oyster'"	2022	Soonsik Yang	
"Antifragile Trailer 'The Hydra'"	2022	NDVisual	
"Unforgiven Trailer 'Burn the Bridge'"	2023	Woogie Kim	
"Easy Trailer 'Good Bones'"	2024	Kwanggoeng Yu	
"Crazy Trailer 'Chasing Lightning'"	2024	Boseung Kim, Jaedon Lee (Studio Bone)	
"Hot Trailer 'Born Fire'"	2025	Yunah Sheep	
"Eat It Up!"	2025	Wontae Go	
"The Kick"	2025	Wontae Go	
"Pureflow Pt. 1 Trailer 'We Walkin' Here'"	2026	Hans Kim (SSM)	

== Filmography ==
=== Web shows ===
Web shows appearances
Year	Title	Notes	Ref.
2022–present	Le Play	Behind the scenes shorts of the members' activities	
2022–present	Episode	Behind the scenes of the members' activities	
2022–present	Fim-Log	Vlog content of the members	
2022	Day Off	Reality show series	
2022–present	Leniverse	Weekly variety shows	
2022	Le Sserafim – The World Is My Oyster	Documentary on the group's predebut period	
2023	Day Off 2 in Jeju	Reality show series	
2023	Day Off 3 Vacance	Reality show series	
2024	Day Off 4 in Japan	Reality show series	
2024	Le Sserafim – Make It Look Easy	Documentary on the group's journey in the past year	

== Concerts and tours ==
- Flame Rises Tour (2023)
- Easy Crazy Hot Tour (2025–2026)
- Pureflow Tour (2026)
