= Kim Chaewon =

South Korean singer (born 2000)

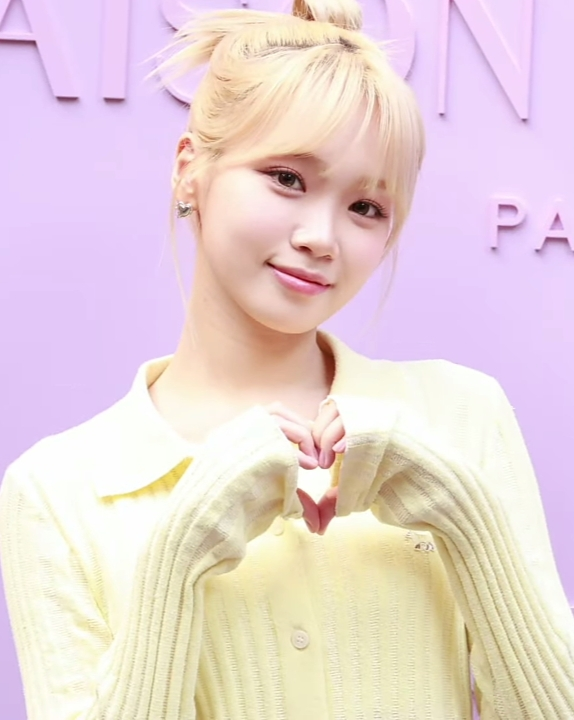
- Kim in 2024
- Born: August 1, 2000 (age 26); Seoul, South Korea
- Education: Hanlim Multi Art School
- Occupation: Singer
- Musical career
- Genres: K-pop; J-pop
- Instrument: Vocals
- Years active: 2018–present
- Labels: Woollim; Off The Record (Note: As a member of Iz*One only.); EMI (Note: As a member of Iz*One (2018–2021) and Le Sserafim (since 2022) only.); Source; Geffen (Note: As a member of Le Sserafim only.)
- Member of: Le Sserafim
- Formerly of: Iz*One

Korean name
- Hangul: 김채원
- RR: Gim Chaewon
- MR: Kim Ch'aewŏn

Kim Chaewon (Korean: 김채원; born August 1, 2000) is a South Korean singer. She is the leader of South Korean girl group Le Sserafim and a former member of the girl group Iz*One, having finished tenth in the reality competition series Produce 48 in 2018.

== Early life and education ==
Kim was born on August 1, 2000, in Gangnam, Seoul, South Korea. Her family consists of her parents and an older sister. Her mother is the theater actress Lee Ran-hee. Kim attended Seoul Poi Elementary School, Guryong Middle School, and Gaepo High School. She later transferred to Hanlim Multi Art School, graduating in 2019. In 2012, Kim performed in KBS' Korea Children's Song Contest.

== Career ==
=== 2018–2021: Produce 48 and Iz*One ===
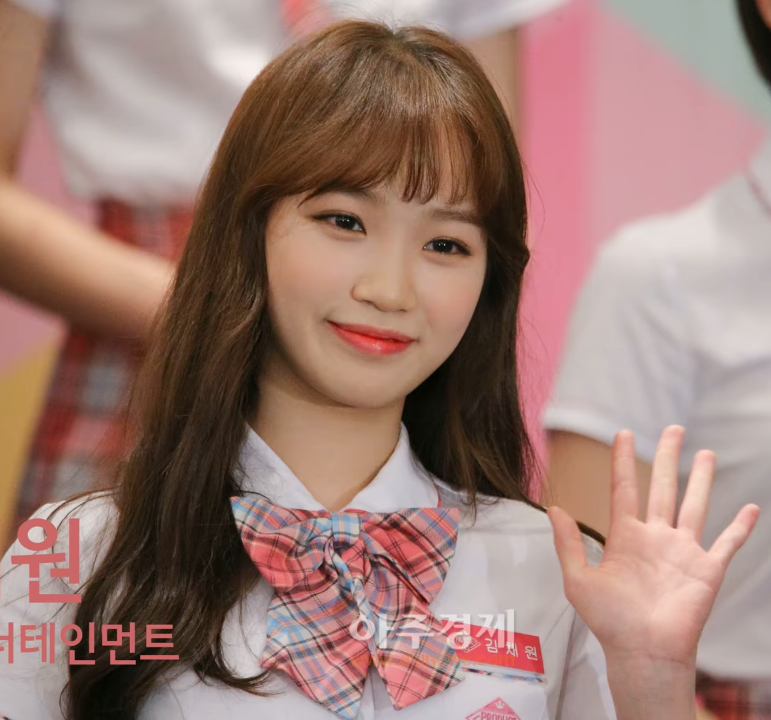
Kim at Produce 48 in 2018

In 2018, Kim participated in the South Korean survival show Produce 48 by Mnet, representing Woollim Entertainment alongside Kwon Eun-bi, and Su-yun and So-hee of Rocket Punch. Prior to joining the survival show, Kim trained under Woollim Entertainment for 11 months. She finished in 10th place earning 238,192 votes, allowing her to debut in Iz*One, with labelmate Kwon Eun-bi. Kim officially debuted as a member of Iz*One on October 29, 2018, with the release of their first extended play (EP) Color*Iz and its lead single "La Vie en Rose".

In 2020, Kim was first credited for music composition on Oneiric Diary, for the track "With*One". She also contributed to writing lyrics for the song "Slow Journey", featured on Iz*One's final EP, One-reeler / Act IV. In March 2021, Kim competed in King of Mask Singer under the name "Formosan Deer". On March 13 and 14, Iz*One held their final concert, One, The Story. The group's contract officially expired on April 29.

After the dissolution of Iz*One, Kim returned to her parent company, Woollim Entertainment. She, alongside Kwon Eun-bi, participated together in a few magazine shoots for Esquire Magazine, Indeed Magazine, and Singles Magazine.

=== 2022–present: Debut with Le Sserafim ===
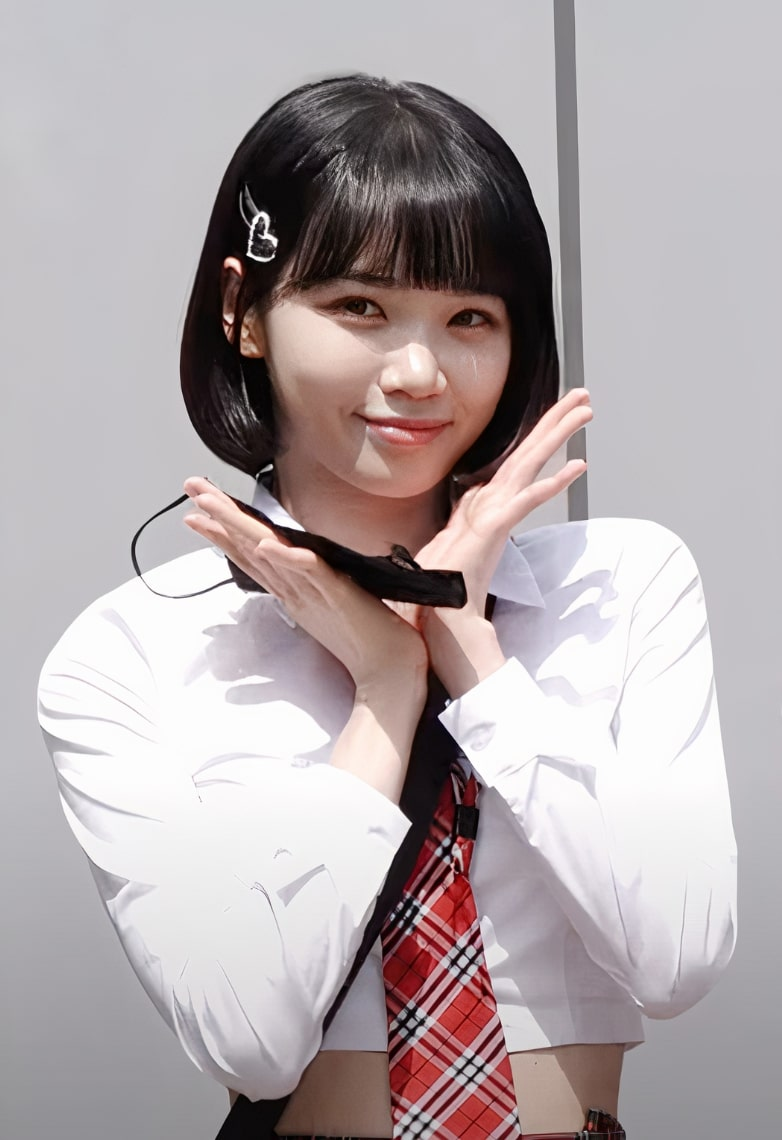
Kim in April 2022

On March 14, 2022, Source Music announced that Kim, alongside former Iz*One member, Sakura Miyawaki, signed exclusive contracts with the company, and was confirmed to debut in their new girl group Le Sserafim. Kim was revealed as the group's fourth member and leader on April 7. Kim made her debut as a member of Le Sserafim on May 2, with their extended play, Fearless.

On April 4, 2024, it was announced that Kim would be featured on the track "Spruce", from Tori Kelly's fifth studio album Tori. On July 10, 2025, Kim Chaewon was featured alongside Tomorrow X Together member Taehyun on JVKE's single "Butterflies". On May 19, 2026, Source Music announced that Kim would take a rest from group activities following the advice of medical professionals treating her for neck pain.

== Endorsements ==
On August 27, 2024, the jewelry brand Swarovski announced that Kim would serve as an ambassador for the company in South Korea, marking her first solo ambassadorship with a luxury fashion brand. In February 2026, Kim was featured in an advertising campaign for the PlayStation 5 that ran across Southeast Asia during Lunar New Year.

== Discography ==
=== Singles ===
List of singles, showing year released, and name of the album
Title	Year	Album
"Spruce" (Tori Kelly featuring Kim Chae-won)	2024	Tori
"Butterflies" (Jvke featuring Taehyun and Kim Chaewon)	2025	Non-album single

=== Soundtrack appearances ===
List of soundtrack appearances, showing year released, selected chart positions, sales figures and album name
Title	Year	Peak chart positions		Sales	Album
Title	Year	KOR DL	JPN Dig.	Sales	Album
"Confession"	2025	152	30	JPN: 1,247 (dig.)	Romantics Anonymous OST

=== Songwriting credits ===
All song credits are adapted from the Korea Music Copyright Association's database unless stated otherwise.

List of songs, showing year released, artist name, and name of the album
Title	Year	Artist	Album	Lyricist	Composer
"With*One"	2020	Iz*One	Oneiric Diary	Yes	No
"Slow Journey" (느린여행)	2020	Iz*One	One-reeler / Act IV	Yes	Yes
"Blue Flame"	2022	Le Sserafim	Fearless	Yes	Yes
"Fearnot (Between You, Me and the Lamppost)" (피어나)	2023	Le Sserafim	Unforgiven	Yes	No
"Swan Song"	2024	Le Sserafim	Easy	Yes	Yes
"So Cynical (Badum)"	2025	Le Sserafim	Hot	Yes	Yes
"Celebration"	2026	Le Sserafim	Pureflow Pt. 1	Yes	Yes
"Trust Exercise"	2026	Le Sserafim	Pureflow Pt. 1	Yes	Yes
"Liminal Space"	2026	Le Sserafim	Pureflow Pt. 1	Yes	No

== Filmography ==
=== Television shows ===
Year	Title	Role	Note	Ref.
2018	Produce 48	Contestant	Finished 10th	
2021	King of Mask Singer	Contestant	under the name "Formosan Deer"	
2023	HMLYCP	Cast Member		

=== Web series ===
Year	Title	Role	Notes	Ref.
2023	Fill in the Next Blank	Main cast	Documentary	

=== Music video appearances ===
Year	Title	Artist	Ref.
2018	"Let Me"	Golden Child	

== Awards and nominations ==
List of awards and nominations
Award ceremony	Year	Category	Nominee(s)	Result	Ref.
Asia Artist Awards	2025	Best Choice – Singer	Kim Chaewon	Won	
