= List of songs recorded by Le Sserafim =

Le Sserafim in 2026

The following is a list of songs recorded by South Korean girl group Le Sserafim, consisting of members Sakura Miyawaki, Kim Chaewon, Huh Yunjin, Kazuha Nakamura, and Hong Eunchae. As of October 2026, the girl group has officially released 57 songs, of which 43 songs were originally recorded in Korean, 8 were originally recorded in English, and 6 were originally recorded in Japanese. (Note: Re-recorded versions not included.)

Key
| † | Indicates a single release |
| # | Indicates a promotional single release |
| ‡ | Indicates a soundtrack single release |

== Songs originally recorded in Korean ==
| Song | Year | Writer(s) | Arranger(s) | Originating album | Ref. |
|---|---|---|---|---|---|
| "AEIOU" | 2026 | Danke; Hadar Adora; Her0ism; Jon Santana; Kid Milli; Kim Chae-ah; Megatone (13); Score (13); Lee Yi-jin; Youra (Full8loom); Sokodomo | Her0ism; Jon Santana | Made My Night | |
| "Antifragile" † | 2022 | Danke; Isabella Lovestory; Kyler Niko; Megatone (13); Score (13); Nathalie Boone; Paulina Cerrilla; Ronnie Icon; Shintaro Yasuda; Supreme Boi "Hitman" Bang | 13 | Antifragile | |
| "Ash" | 2025 | Baek Sae-im; Boy Matthews; Casey Smith; Danke; Huh Yunjin; Junhyuk; Mark Schick; Megatone (13); Score (13); Peter Rycroft "Hitman" Bang | Lostboy; Mark Schick | Hot | |
| "Blue Flame" | 2022 | Caroline Gustavsson; Danke; Jonna Hall; Huh Yunjin; Megatone (13); Score (13); Ronnie Icon; Kim Chaewon; Gayoung; Kim In-hyung | 13 | Fearless | |
| "Born Fire" | 2025 | Hybe; Megatone (13); Score (13) | 13 | Hot | |
| "Burn the Bridge" | 2023 | Hybe; Megatone (13); Score (13) | 13 | Unforgiven | |
| "Celebration" † | 2026 | Aino Jawo; Alexis Duvivier; Caroline Hjelt; Dannie Fite; Huh Yunjin; JBach; Louice Hellström; Mathilda Winberg; Megatone (13); Score (13); Pär Almqvist; Softest Hard; Supreme Boi; Victor Cossement; Young Chance; Kim Chaewon "Hitman" Bang | 13; Alexis Duvivier; Dannie Fite; Pär Almqvist; Softest Hard; Victor Cossement "Hitman" Bang | Pureflow Pt. 1 | |
| "Chasing Lightning" | 2024 | Hybe; Megatone (13); Score (13) | 13 | Crazy | |
| "Crazier" (미치지 못하는 이유) | 2024 | "Hitman" Bang; Huh Yunjin; Megatone (13); Score (13) | 13; Huh Yunjin | Crazy | |
| "Crazy" † | 2024 | Amanda Ibanez; Anthony Watts; Huh Yunjin; JBach; Jake Torrey; Leven Kali; Sakura Miyawaki; Megatone (13); Score (13); Supreme Boi; Iluvjulia "Hitman" Bang | 13; Iluvjulia "Hitman" Bang | Crazy | |
| "Creatures" | 2026 | Danke; David Charles Fischer; Evan Blair; Jeon Ji-eun; Kristin Carpenter; Megan Bülow; Megatone (13); Score (13); Youra "Hitman" Bang | 13; Evan Blair "Hitman" Bang | Pureflow Pt. 1 | |
| "Easy" † | 2024 | "Hitman" Bang; Alex Fernandez; Amanda Ibanez; Hadar Adora; Jordyn Smith; Joseph Barrios; Megatone (13); Score (13); Sean Turk; Supreme Boi | 13; Cashae; Sean Turk | Easy | |
| "Eve, Psyche & the Bluebeard's Wife" (이브, 프시케 그리고 푸른 수염의 아내) † | 2023 | Arineh Karami; Benjmn; Danke; Gusten Dahlqvist; Huh Yunjin; Lee Hyung-seok; Maia Wright; Max Thulin; Megatone (13); Score (13) "Hitman" Bang | 13 | Unforgiven | |
| "Fearless" † | 2022 | "Hitman" Bang; BLVSH; Destiny Rogers; Emmy Kasai; Jaro; Josefin Glenmark; Kyler Niko; Megatone (13); Score (13); Nikolay Mohr; Oneye; Paulina Cerrilla; Supreme Boi | 13 | Fearless | |
| "Fearnot (Between You, Me and the Lamppost)" (피어나) | 2023 | Hong Eunchae; Huh Yunjin; Jukjae; Kazuha Nakamura; Megatone (13); Score (13); Sakura Miyawaki; Kim Chaewon "Hitman" Bang | 13; Huh Yunjin; Jukjae | Unforgiven | |
| "Fire in the Belly" | 2023 | Anne Judith Wik; Kyler Niko; Megatone (13); Score (13); Nermin Harambašić; Paulina Cerrilla; Supreme Boi "Hitman" Bang | 13 | Unforgiven | |
| "Flash Forward" | 2023 | "Hitman" Bang; Alex Karlsson; Danke; Elizaveta Vassilieva; Hiss Noise; Stian N. Olsen; Lee Hyung-seok | Hiss Noise | Unforgiven | |
| "Good Bones" | 2024 | "Hitman" Bang; Hybe; Megatone (13); Score (13) | 13 | Easy | |
| "Good Parts (When the Quality Is Bad but I Am)" | 2022 | Alex Bilo; Cha Yu-bin; Danke; Jenna Andrews; Sakura Miyawaki; Megatone (13); Score (13); Nolan Lambroza; Salem Ilese | Alex Bilo; Nolan Lambroza | Antifragile | |
| "Guardian" ‡ | 2023 | Danke; Alex Keem; SoftServeBoy; Young Chance; Cazzi Opeia; Arineh Karimi; Jonna Hall; Julia Bognar Finnseter; Anne Judith Wik; Nermin Harambašić | 13 | Bastions OST | |
| "Hot" † | 2025 | Ali Tamposi; Feli Ferraro; Huh Yunjin; Jackson Shanks; Megatone (13); Score (13); Supreme Boi "Hitman" Bang | 13; Jackson Shanks | Hot | |
| "Iffy Iffy" | 2026 | B Ham; BaeBae; Hong Eunchae; Huh Yunjin; Hadar Adora; Jon Santana; Megatone (13); Score (13); Mrose; Shae Jacobs; Youra | B Ham; Jon Santana | Pureflow Pt. 1 | |
| "Impurities" | 2022 | BLVSH; Charli Taft; Daniel "Obi" Klein; Danke; Hayes Kramer; Huh Yunjin; Jaro; Jonna Hall; Maggie Szabo; Kim Chae-ah; Megatone (13); Score (13); Nikolay Mohr "Hitman" Bang; Jo Yoon-kyung | 13 | Antifragile | |
| "Irony" | 2026 | Danke; Huh Yunjin; J14; Jihye Lee; Maya Mougley; Megatone (13); Score (13); Nija Charles; Tyler Lewis; Tropkillaz; Violet Skies; Wuhyun Park; Yubin Hwang; Youra "Hitman" Bang; Kim Su-ji | 13; Tropkillaz "Hitman" Bang | Pureflow Pt. 1 | |
| "Liminal Space" | 2026 | Hong Eunchae; Huh Yunjin; Kazuha Nakamura; Megatone (13); Score (13); Sakura Miyawaki; Kim Chaewon | 13 | Pureflow Pt. 1 | |
| "Need Your Company" (우리 어떻게 더 사귈 수 있을까) | 2026 | Huh Yunjin; Megatone (13); Score (13) | 13 | Pureflow Pt. 1 | |
| "No Celestial" | 2022 | Danke; Julia Bognar Finnsetrer; Megatone (13); Score (13); Nermin Harambašić; Huh Yunjin; Poutyface; Ronnie Icon; Shorelle; Cazzi Opeia; Ellen Berg; Young Chance; Park Sang-yu; Kim In-hyung | 13 | Antifragile | |
| "No-Return (Into the Unknown)" | 2023 | Arineh Karimi; Charli Taft; Daniel "Obi" Klein; Megatone (13); Score (13); Cazzi Opeia; Shorelle; Supreme Boi; Young Chance "Hitman" Bang | 13 | Unforgiven | |
| "Pearlies (My Oyster Is the World)" | 2025 | 444Boy; Huh Yunjin; Maize; Sofia Kay | 444Boy | Spaghetti | |
| "Pierrot" | 2024 | Martin; Megatone (13); Score (13); Supreme Boi "Hitman" Bang | 13 "Hitman" Bang | Crazy | |
| "Pureflow" | 2026 | Megatone (13); Score (13); Source Music "Hitman" Bang | 13 | Pureflow Pt. 1 | |
| "Smart" † | 2024 | "Hitman" Bang; Arineh Karimi; BB Elliot; Charli; Huh Yunjin; Hadar Adora; Jasmin Lee Maming; Lee Eunwha; Megatone (13); Score (13); Paige Garabito; Supreme Boi; Teodor Herrgårdh; Zzz. | 13 | Easy | |
| "So Cynical (Badum)" | 2025 | Anthony Watts; Ejae; Hong Eunchae; Huh Yunjin; Vitals; Kim Chaewon "Hitman" Bang | Vitals | Hot | |
| "Sonder" | 2026 | Anthony Watts; B. Lewis; Melissa Storwick; Huh Yunjin; J14; Jeon Ji-eun; Jihye Lee; Jinli; Megatone (13); Score (13); Youra; Kim Su-ji | B. Lewis | Pureflow Pt. 1 | |
| "Sour Grapes" | 2022 | Abir; Danke; Kayofkaj; Lady V Megatone (13); Score (13); Nermin Harambašić; Cazzi Opeia; Ellen Berg; Kim In-hyeong | 13 | Fearless | |
| "Spaghetti" † (feat. J-Hope) | 2025 | Alex Jonathan Crofton Ball; Annika Bennett; Elle Campbell; Federico Vindver; Gian Stone; Huh Yunjin; J-Hope; JBach; Matt Holmes; Megatone (13); Score (13); Phil Leigh; Sakura Miyawaki; Tobias Wincorn; Park Woo-hyun "Hitman" Bang | 13; Federico Vindver; Gian Stone; Tobias Wincorn "Hitman" Bang | Spaghetti | |
| "Swan Song" | 2024 | "Hitman" Bang; Huh Yunjin; Justin Tranter; Sakura Miyawaki; Megatone (13); Score (13); Kazuha Nakamura; Sarah Troy; Slow Rabbit; Supreme Boi; Kim Chaewon | 13; Slow Rabbit | Easy | |
| "The Great Mermaid" | 2022 | "Hitman" Bang; Anne Judith Wik; Danke; Kyler Niko; Megatone (13); Score (13); Nermin Harambašić; Paulina Cerrilla; Ronny Svendsen; Cazzi Opeia; Ellen Berg; Lee Hyung-seok; Jeong Jin-woo | 13 | Fearless | |
| "The Hydra" | 2022 | Hybe; Megatone (13); Score (13) | 13 | Antifragile | |
| "The World Is My Oyster" | 2022 | Hybe; Megatone (13); Score (13) | 13 | Fearless | |
| "Trust Exercise" | 2026 | Danke; Hong Eunchae; Huh Yunjin; Kazuha Nakamura; Kim Chae-ah; Lee Aeng-du; Lee Eun-hwa; Megatone (13); Score (13); Mola; Moon Ji-yeong; Yiyijin; Kim Chaewon | 13 | Pureflow Pt. 1 | |
| "Unforgiven" † (feat. Nile Rodgers) | 2023 | Anders Gukko; Anne Judith Wik; Believve; Belle; Benjmn; Ennio Morricone; Feli Ferraro; Glenda Proby; Josefin Glenmark; Kris Jana; Kyler Niko; Makaila J. Garcia; Megatone (13); Score (13); Nermin Harambašić; Oneye; Supreme Boy; Young Chance | 13 | Unforgiven | |
| "We Got So Much" | 2024 | "Hitman" Bang; Danke; Hong Eunchae; Huh Yunjin; Megatone (13); Score (13); Noh Ju-hwan; Sofia Vivere | Noh Ju-hwan | Easy | |

== Songs originally recorded in English ==
| Song | Year | Writer(s) | Arranger(s) | Originating album | Ref. |
|---|---|---|---|---|---|
| "1-800-Hot-N-Fun" | 2024 | AOBeats; BloodPop; Mark Johns; Megatone (13); Omer Fedi; Score (13) "Hitman" Bang | AOBeats; BloodPop | Crazy | |
| "Boompala" † | 2026 | Ale Alberti; Antonio Romero Monge; Celine Polenghi; Dëlian; Eren Cannata; JBach; Justin Tranter; Megatone (13); Score (13); Orion Meshorer; Rafael Ruiz Perdigones; Tariq Sharrieff; Thom Bridges "Hitman" Bang | 13; Thom Bridges "Hitman" Bang | Pureflow Pt. 1 | |
| "Come Over" | 2025 | J Lloyd; Lydia Kitto; Megatone (13); Score (13) | 13; J Lloyd; Lydia Kitto | Hot | |
| "Iconic by Mistake" † (with Illit and Katseye) | 2026 | Justin Tranter; Madison Love; Alice Longyu Gao; Brandon Colbein; Amanda Ibanez; Alyx Mendoza; Dyvahh; McKay Stevens; Sean Cook | Dyvahh; McKay Stevens; Sean Cook | Non-album single | |
| "Kawaii" ‡ | 2025 | BB Elliot; CX Lucas; Gen Hoshino; Huh Yunjin; IKKI; Jonna Hall; Justin Reinstein; Kanata Okajima; Malin Christin; Maya Rose; Megatone (13); Score (13); Morgan Kubes; Ninos Hanna; Okhan Uenver; Loar | 13; Gen Hoshino | My Melody & Kuromi OST | |
| "Made My Night" † | 2026 | Brandon Colbein; Castle; Connor McDonough; Justin Tranter; Mae Muller; Riley McDonough; Ryan Daly | Connor McDonough; Riley McDonough; Ryan Daly | Made My Night | |
| "Perfect Night" † | 2023 | "Hitman" Bang; Amanda Ibanez; Jorge Luis Perez Jr. Lauren Aquilina; Marcus Andersson; Megatone (13); Score (13); Niklas Jarelius Persson; Ninos Hanna; Sofia Quinn; Zikai; Huh Yunjin | "Hitman" Bang; 13 | Non-album single | |
| "Saki" (feat. Aliyah's Interlude) | 2026 | 8AE; Aliyah Bah; Dan Farber; Huh Yunjin; Megatone (13); Score (13); Nathan Butts; Sorana Păcurar | Dan Farber; Nathan Butts | Pureflow Pt. 1 | |

== Songs originally recorded in Japanese ==
| Song | Year | Writer(s) | Arranger(s) | Originating album | Ref. |
|---|---|---|---|---|---|
| "Choices" ‡ | 2023 | Alysa; Daniel Kim; Jeremy G Lauren Kaori; Phil Schwan; Miwaflower | Alysa; Phil Schwan | 3000 Yen: How to Enrich Life OST | |
| "Different" † | 2025 | Amanda Ibanez; Canchild; Megatone (13); Score (13); Steven Franks; Sunny; Tommy Brown | 13; Steven Franks; Tommy Brown | Non-album single | |
| "Dresscode" (ドレスコード) # | 2023 | Singo Kubota; Imase | | Sexy Tanaka-san OST | |
| "Jewelry" (ジュエリー) # | 2024 | Singo Kubota; Imase | | Non-album single | |
| "Star Signs" # | 2024 | Gio Varchi; JunHyuk; Kanata Okajima; Kentz; Zen | JunHyuk; Kentz | Non-album single | |
| "The Noise" # (with Yoasobi) | 2024 | Ayase; Tokyo Coffee Break | | Non-album single | |
