= Le Sserafim discography =

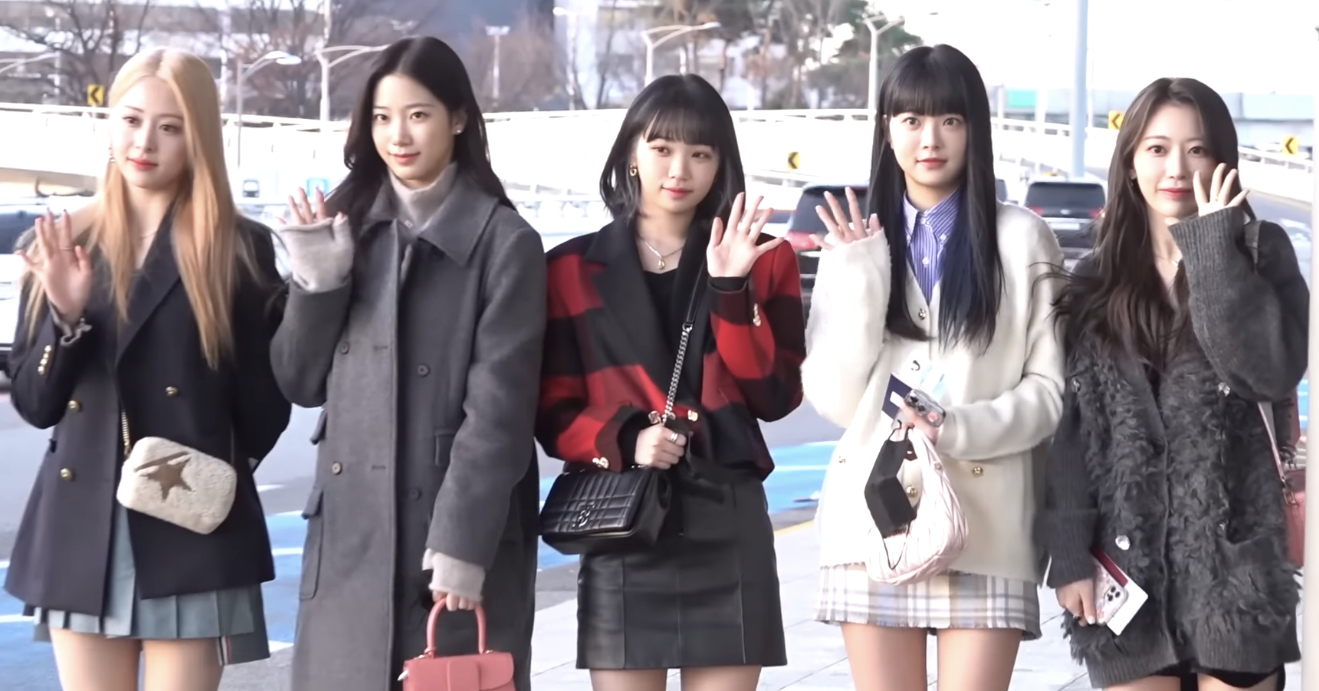
- Le Sserafim in 2022
- Studio albums: 2
- EPs: 5
- Compilation albums: 1
- Singles: 18
- Single albums: 2
- Promotional singles: 7

South Korean girl group Le Sserafim has released two studio albums, five extended plays, two single albums, one compilation album, eighteen singles, and seven promotional singles.

The group made their debut with the extended play Fearless, which sold more than 175,000 copies on its first day of release, breaking the record for the highest single-day sales for the debut album of a female K-pop act. The EP went on to receive a 2× platinum certification in South Korea for selling over 500,000 copies. Its title track of the same name reached the top ten on South Korea's Circle Digital Chart and was certified platinum for streaming in Japan. The Japanese version of the single was released physically in Japan, where it was certified 2× platinum for sales.

Le Sserafim's second extended play, Antifragile, was their first to be certified million for selling over a million copies in South Korea. Its title track of the same name peaked at number two in South Korea and was certified platinum for streaming in Japan. The group's first studio album, Unforgiven, was their first number-one album on the Circle Album Chart and their second release to sell over a million copies in South Korea. It was supported by two singles, "Unforgiven" and "Eve, Psyche & the Bluebeard's Wife", both of which reached number two in South Korea and were certified gold for streaming in Japan. The Japanese version of the single "Unforgiven" was also released physically in Japan, where it was certified platinum for sales.

== Albums ==
=== Studio albums ===
List of studio albums, showing selected details, selected chart positions, sales figures, and certifications
Title	Details	Peak chart positions										Sales	Certifications
Title	Details	KOR	BEL (FL)	CAN	FRA	GER	JPN	JPN Hot	NZ	US	US World	Sales	Certifications
Unforgiven	Released: May 1, 2023; Label: Source Music; Formats: CD, digital download, NFC, streaming	1	32	63	20	22	1	1	28	6	1	KOR: 1,571,548; JPN: 117,092 (Note: Combined sales for Unforgiven: Physical: 112,404; Digital: 4,688); US: 38,500	KMCA: Million; RIAJ: Gold
Pureflow Pt. 1	Released: May 22, 2026; Label: Source Music; Formats: CD, digital download, LP, streaming	1	81	—	—	—	2	3	34	10	1	KOR: 679,669; JPN: 79,736; US: 34,000	KMCA: 2× Platinum; RIAJ: Gold
"—" denotes a recording that did not chart or was not released in that territory-->

=== Compilation albums ===
List of compilation albums, showing selected details, and selected chart positions
Title	Details	Peak chart positions	
Title	Details	US Sales	US World
Easy-Crazy-Hot	Released: September 5, 2025; Label: Source Music; Formats: LP	25	9

== Extended plays ==
List of extended plays, showing selected details, selected chart positions, sales figures, and certifications
Title	Details	Peak chart positions										Sales	Certifications
Title	Details	KOR	BEL (FL)	CAN	FRA	GER	JPN	JPN Hot	NZ	US	US World	Sales	Certifications
Fearless	Released: May 2, 2022; Label: Source Music; Formats: CD, digital download, NFC, streaming	2	—	—	—	—	3	1	—	—	—	KOR: 570,995; JPN: 45,994 (Note: Combined sales for Fearless: Physical: 43,166; Digital: 2,828)	KMCA: 2× Platinum
Antifragile	Released: October 17, 2022; Label: Source Music; Formats: CD, digital download, NFC, streaming	2	34	—	32	37	1	1	—	14	1	KOR: 1,233,769; JPN: 75,121 (Note: Combined sales for Antifragile: Physical: 72,314; Digital: 2,807); US: 27,000	KMCA: Million
Easy	Released: February 19, 2024; Label: Source Music; Formats: CD, digital download, NFC, streaming	1	56	73	—	75	1	2	30	8	2	KOR: 1,185,248; JPN: 140,366 (Note: Combined sales for Easy: Physical: 137,251; Digital: 3,115); US: 57,500	KMCA: Million; RIAJ: Gold
Crazy	Released: August 30, 2024; Label: Source Music; Formats: CD, digital download, NFC, streaming	2	29	81	24	25	2	2	26	7	1	KOR: 825,191; JPN: 113,366 (Note: Combined sales for Crazy: Physical: 111,556; Digital: 1,810); US: 57,000	KMCA: 3× Platinum; RIAJ: Gold
Hot	Released: March 14, 2025; Label: Source Music; Formats: CD, digital download, NFC, streaming	1	69	—	51	—	2	6	27	9	1	KOR: 735,492; JPN: 92,243 (Note: Combined sales for Hot: Physical: 90,648; Digital: 1,595); US: 38,500	KMCA: 2× Platinum; RIAJ: Gold
"—" denotes a recording that did not chart or was not released in that territory

== Single albums ==
List of single albums, showing selected details, selected chart positions, sales figures, and certifications
Title	Details	Peak chart positions		Sales	Certifications
Title	Details	KOR	JPN	Sales	Certifications
Spaghetti	Released: October 24, 2025; Label: Source Music; Formats: CD, digital download, LP, streaming	3	1	KOR: 627,899; JPN: 114,638	KMCA: 2× Platinum; RIAJ: Gold
Made My Night	Released: September 11, 2026; Label: Source Music; Formats: CD, digital download, LP, streaming	3	4	KOR: 221,311	KMCA: Platinum

== Singles ==
=== Korean singles ===
List of Korean singles, showing year released, selected chart positions, sales figures, certifications, and name of the album
Title	Year	Peak chart positions										Sales	Certifications	Album
Title	Year	KOR	KOR Bill.	CAN	HK	JPN Cmb.	JPN Hot	SGP	TWN	US	WW	Sales	Certifications	Album
"Fearless"	2022	9	4	—	—	13	9	7	14	—	69	JPN: 6,415	KMCA: Platinum; RIAJ: Platinum	Fearless
"Antifragile"	2022	2	2	96	14	13	12	5	8	—	38	JPN: 4,972	KMCA: Platinum; RIAJ: 2× Platinum; RMNZ: Gold	Antifragile
"Unforgiven" (featuring Nile Rodgers)	2023	2	1	92	11	14	10	3	6	—	23	JPN: 6,941	RIAJ: Platinum	Unforgiven
"Eve, Psyche & the Bluebeard's Wife" (이브, 프시케 그리고 푸른 수염의 아내)	2023	2	2	—	—	22	22	— (Note: "Eve, Psyche and Bluebeard's Wife" did not enter the RIAS International Top Charts, but peaked at number 15 on the Regional Top Charts.)	—	—	66	JPN: 7,037	KMCA: Platinum; RIAJ: Platinum	Unforgiven
"Easy"	2024	3	3	48	1	15	17	1	1	99	13	JPN: 3,125; US: 1,000	RIAJ: Gold	Easy
"Smart"	2024	8	9	91	13	44	46	3	4	—	39		RIAJ: Gold	Easy
"Crazy"	2024	22	11	65	4	17	3	6	3	76	17	JPN: 4,531	RIAJ: Platinum; RMNZ: Gold; BPI: Silver	Crazy
"Hot"	2025	9	—	91	3	40	19	7	4	—	45	JPN: 895		Hot
"Spaghetti" (featuring J-Hope of BTS)	2025	5	8	49	3	2	3	5	4	50	6	JPN: 2,930		Spaghetti
"Celebration"	2026	103	—	—	24	—	29	— (Note: "Celebration" did not enter the Official Singapore Chart, but peaked at number 20 on the Regional Chart.)	21	—	— (Note: "Celebration" did not enter the Billboard Global 200, but peaked at number 170 on the Global Excl. US.)			Pureflow Pt. 1
"—" denotes a recording that did not chart or was not released in that territory

=== Japanese singles ===
List of Japanese singles, showing year released, selected chart positions, sales figures, certifications, and name of the album
Title	Year	Peak chart positions					Sales	Certifications	Album
Title	Year	KOR DL	JPN	JPN Hot	NZ Hot	US World	Sales	Certifications	Album
"Fearless"	2023	—	1	1	—	—	JPN: 277,391	RIAJ: 2× Platinum	Non-album singles
"Unforgiven" (featuring Nile Rodgers and Ado)	2023	—	2	6	—	—	JPN: 222,212	RIAJ: Platinum	Non-album singles
"Crazy"	2024	—	2	—	—	—	JPN: 150,605	RIAJ: Gold	Non-album singles
"Different"	2025	85	2	2	34	9	KOR: 3,206; JPN: 157,152	RIAJ: Gold	Non-album singles
"—" denotes a recording that did not chart or was not released in that territory

=== English singles ===
List of English singles, showing year released, selected chart positions, sales figures, certifications, and name of the album
Title	Year	Peak chart positions										Sales	Certifications	Album
Title	Year	KOR	CAN	HK	JPN Cmb.	JPN Hot	NZ	SGP	TWN	US	WW	Sales	Certifications	Album
"Perfect Night"	2023	1	58	1	10	7	— (Note: "Perfect Night" did not enter the NZ Top 40 Singles Chart, but peaked at number 5 on the NZ Hot Singles Chart.)	1	1	— (Note: "Perfect Night" did not enter the Billboard Hot 100, but peaked at number 19 on the Bubbling Under Hot 100 chart.)	18	JPN: 24,247	KMCA: Platinum; RIAJ: 2× Platinum; RMNZ: Gold	Non-album single
"Boompala"	2026	18	—	14	44	15	— (Note: "Boompala" did not enter the NZ Top 40 Singles Chart, but peaked at number 8 on the NZ Hot Singles Chart.)	15	11	— (Note: "Boompala" did not enter the Billboard Hot 100, but peaked at number 10 on the Bubbling Under Hot 100 chart.)	98			Pureflow Pt. 1
"Iconic by Mistake" (with Illit and Katseye)	2026	123	46	9	—	38	29	3	6	38	23			Non-album single
"Made My Night"	2026	183	—	25	8	21	— (Note: "Made My Night" did not enter the NZ Top 40 Singles Chart, but peaked at number 7 on the NZ Hot Singles Chart.)	— (Note: "Made My Night" did not enter the Official Singapore Chart, but peaked at number 14 on the Regional Chart.)	18	— (Note: "Made My Night" did not enter the Billboard Hot 100, but peaked at number 14 on the Bubbling Under Hot 100 chart.)	—	JPN: 26,028		Made My Night
"—" denotes a recording that did not chart or was not released in that territory

== Promotional singles ==
List of promotional singles, showing year released, selected chart positions, sales figures, and name of the album
Title	Year	Peak chart positions		Sales	Album
Title	Year	KOR DL	JPN Hot	Sales	Album
"Choices"	2023	191	—		3000 Yen: How to Enrich Life OST (Note: "Choices" is also a B-side of the Japanese version of "Fearless".)
"Guardian"	2023	83	—		Bastions OST
"Jewelry" (ジュエリー)	2023	—	81		Non-album single (B-side of the Japanese version of "Unforgiven")
"Dresscode" (ドレスコード)	2023	—	65	JPN: 3,353	Sexy Tanaka-san OST
"Star Signs"	2024	—	—		Non-album single (B-side of the Japanese version of "Crazy")
"Kawaii"	2025	—	52	JPN: 1,567	My Melody & Kuromi OST (Note: "Kawaii" is also a B-side of "Different".)
"The Noise" (with Yoasobi)	2025	—	—		Non-album single
"—" denotes a recording that did not chart or was not released in that territory

== Other charted songs ==
List of other charted songs, showing year released, selected chart positions, sales figures, and name of the album
Title	Year	Peak chart positions								Sales	Album
Title	Year	KOR	KOR Songs	HK	JPN Hot	NZ Hot	SGP	TWN	US World	Sales	Album
"The World Is My Oyster"	2022	— (Note: "The World Is My Oyster" did not enter the Gaon Digital Chart, but peaked at number 73 on the Gaon Download Chart.)	—	—	—	—	—	—	—		Fearless
"Blue Flame"	2022	193	—	—	—	—	— (Note: "Blue Flame" did not enter the RIAS Top Streaming Chart, but peaked at number 30 on the Top Regional Chart.)	—	—		Fearless
"The Great Mermaid"	2022	— (Note: "The Great Mermaid" did not enter the Gaon Digital Chart, but peaked at number 62 on the Gaon Download Chart.)	—	—	—	—	—	—	—		Fearless
"Sour Grapes"	2022	— (Note: "Sour Grapes" did not enter the Gaon Digital Chart, but peaked at number 64 on the Gaon Download Chart.)	—	—	—	—	— (Note: "Sour Grapes" did not enter the RIAS Top Streaming Chart, but peaked at number 27 on the Top Regional Chart.)	—	—		Fearless
"The Hydra"	2022	— (Note: "The Hydra" did not enter the Circle Digital Chart, but peaked at number 41 on the Circle Download Chart.)	—	—	—	—	—	—	—		Antifragile
"Impurities"	2022	140	24	—	—	—	—	—	—		Antifragile
"No Celestial"	2022	149	—	—	—	—	—	—	—		Antifragile
"Good Parts (When the Quality Is Bad but I Am)"	2022	154	—	—	—	—	— (Note: "Good Parts (When the Quality Is Bad but I Am)" did not enter the RIAS Top Streaming Chart, but peaked at number 26 on the Top Regional Chart.)	—	—		Antifragile
"Burn the Bridge"	2023	— (Note: "Burn the Bridge" did not enter the Circle Digital Chart, but it peaked at number 36 on the component Circle Download Chart.)	—	—	—	—	—	—	—		Unforgiven
"Fearless" (2023 version)	2023	181	—	—	—	—	—	—	—		Unforgiven
"Blue Flame" (2023 version)	2023	199	—	—	—	—	—	—	—		Unforgiven
"No-Return (Into the Unknown)"	2023	98	—	—	—	—	—	—	—		Unforgiven
"Fearnot (Between You, Me and the Lamppost)" (피어나)	2023	130	—	—	—	—	—	—	—		Unforgiven
"Flash Forward"	2023	148	—	—	—	—	—	—	—		Unforgiven
"Fire in the Belly"	2023	167	—	—	—	—	—	—	—		Unforgiven
"Good Bones"	2024	127	—	—	—	—	—	—	—		Easy
"Swan Song"	2024	78	—	21	—	25	— (Note: "Swan Song" did not enter the RIAS Top Streaming Chart, but peaked at number 11 on the Top Regional Chart.)	25	—		Easy
"We Got So Much"	2024	113	—	—	—	35	—	—	—		Easy
"Chasing Lightning"	2024	— (Note: "Chasing Lightning" did not enter the Circle Digital Chart, but it peaked at number 23 on the component Circle Download Chart.)	—	—	—	—	—	—	—		Crazy
"Pierrot"	2024	— (Note: "Pierrot" did not enter the Circle Digital Chart, but it peaked at number 21 on the component Circle Download Chart.)	—	—	—	16	— (Note: "Pierrot" did not enter the RIAS Top Streaming Chart, but peaked at number 28 on the Top Regional Chart.)	—	—		Crazy
"1-800-Hot-N-Fun"	2024	— (Note: "1-800-Hot-N-Fun" did not enter the Circle Digital Chart, but it peaked at number 20 on the component Circle Download Chart.)	—	—	—	8	26	—	—		Crazy
"Crazier" (미치지 못하는 이유)	2024	— (Note: "Crazier" did not enter the Circle Digital Chart, but it peaked at number 22 on the component Circle Download Chart.)	—	—	—	34	—	—	—		Crazy
"Born Fire"	2025	— (Note: "Born Fire" did not enter the Circle Digital Chart, but it peaked at number 46 on the component Circle Download Chart.)	—	—	—	—	—	—	—		Hot
"Come Over"	2025	94	—	—	57	18	—	—	—	JPN: 1,046	Hot
"Ash"	2025	— (Note: "Ash" did not enter the Circle Digital Chart, but it peaked at number 29 on the component Circle Download Chart.)	—	—	—	21	—	—	8		Hot
"So Cynical (Badum)"	2025	— (Note: "So Cynical (Badum)" did not enter the Circle Download Chart, but it peaked at number 36 on the component Circle Digital Chart.)	—	—	—	20	—	—	—		Hot
"Pearlies (My Oyster Is the World)"	2025	— (Note: "Pearlies (My Oyster Is the World)" did not enter the Circle Digital Chart, but it peaked at number 29 on the component Circle Download Chart.)	—	—	—	—	—	—	—		Spaghetti
"Spaghetti" (Member version)	2025	— (Note: "Spaghetti" (Member version) did not enter the Circle Digital Chart, but it peaked at number 72 on the component Circle Download Chart.)	—	—	—	—	—	—	—		Spaghetti
"Spaghetti" (English version)	2025	— (Note: "Spaghetti" (English version) did not enter the Circle Digital Chart, but it peaked at number 99 on the component Circle Download Chart.)	—	—	—	—	—	—	—		Spaghetti
"Iffy Iffy"	2026	—	—	—	—	24	—	—	—		Pureflow Pt. 1
"—" denotes a recording that did not chart or was not released in that territory.
