= Easy Crazy Hot Tour =

2025–2026 concert tour by Le Sserafim

- World tour by Le Sserafim
- Official poster
- Location: Asia; North America
- Associated albums: Easy; Crazy; Hot
- Start date: April 19, 2025
- End date: February 1, 2026
- No. of shows: 31

Le Sserafim concert chronology
- Flame Rises Tour (2023); Easy Crazy Hot Tour (2025–2026); Pureflow Tour (2026)

The Easy Crazy Hot Tour was the first worldwide concert tour and second overall by South Korean girl group Le Sserafim, held in support of the group's extended plays Easy (2024), Crazy (2024), and Hot (2025). The tour began in Incheon, South Korea, on April 19, 2025, and concluded on February 1, 2026 in Seoul, with 31 shows across Asia and North America.

The tour was positively received and commercially successful, grossing $34.1 million and becoming one of the top 10 highest-grossing K-pop tours of 2025.

== Background ==
The Easy Crazy Hot Tour was announced by Source Music on February 28, 2025, with initial dates spanning locations in South Korea, Japan, Taiwan, Hong Kong, the Philippines, Thailand, and Singapore.

As part of the tour's initial announcement, it was noted that a North American leg would take place in September 2025. Details were revealed in June 2025, with shows confirmed in seven cities in the United States and one in Mexico.

For the North American leg of the tour, the group partnered with Amazon Music to distribute tour merchandise including apparel and light sticks. Merchandise was sold online, at concert venues, and at pop-up stores in Los Angeles and Seattle, which utilized cashierless payment and were visited by over 1,700 people.

In November 2025, two shows, marketed as the Easy Crazy Hot Encore, took place at the Tokyo Dome. Following this, two final encore shows in Seoul were announced for early 2026, marking the conclusion of the tour.

== Reception ==
The Easy Crazy Hot Tour was positively received worldwide. Lee Jung-youn of The Korea Herald praised the group's "visually striking performances" at the Incheon show, calling it "a clear step up" from past shows. Elisa Chia of The Straits Times, reviewing the Singapore show, said that the members had "heartfelt appreciation" for the audience, and that it was clear they "were eager to impress and connect with their fans". Similarly, Gabriel Saulog of Billboard Philippines highlighted the "extensive" set list and the emotional weight of the members' speeches at the Manila show, saying that the tour "not only showcased how far they've come in the three years since their debut, but also showed us why exactly the world is watching". Eric Diep of The Dallas Observer, covering the Grand Prairie show, applauded the tour's production and effects, positive atmosphere, and the group's interactions with each other.

== Set list ==
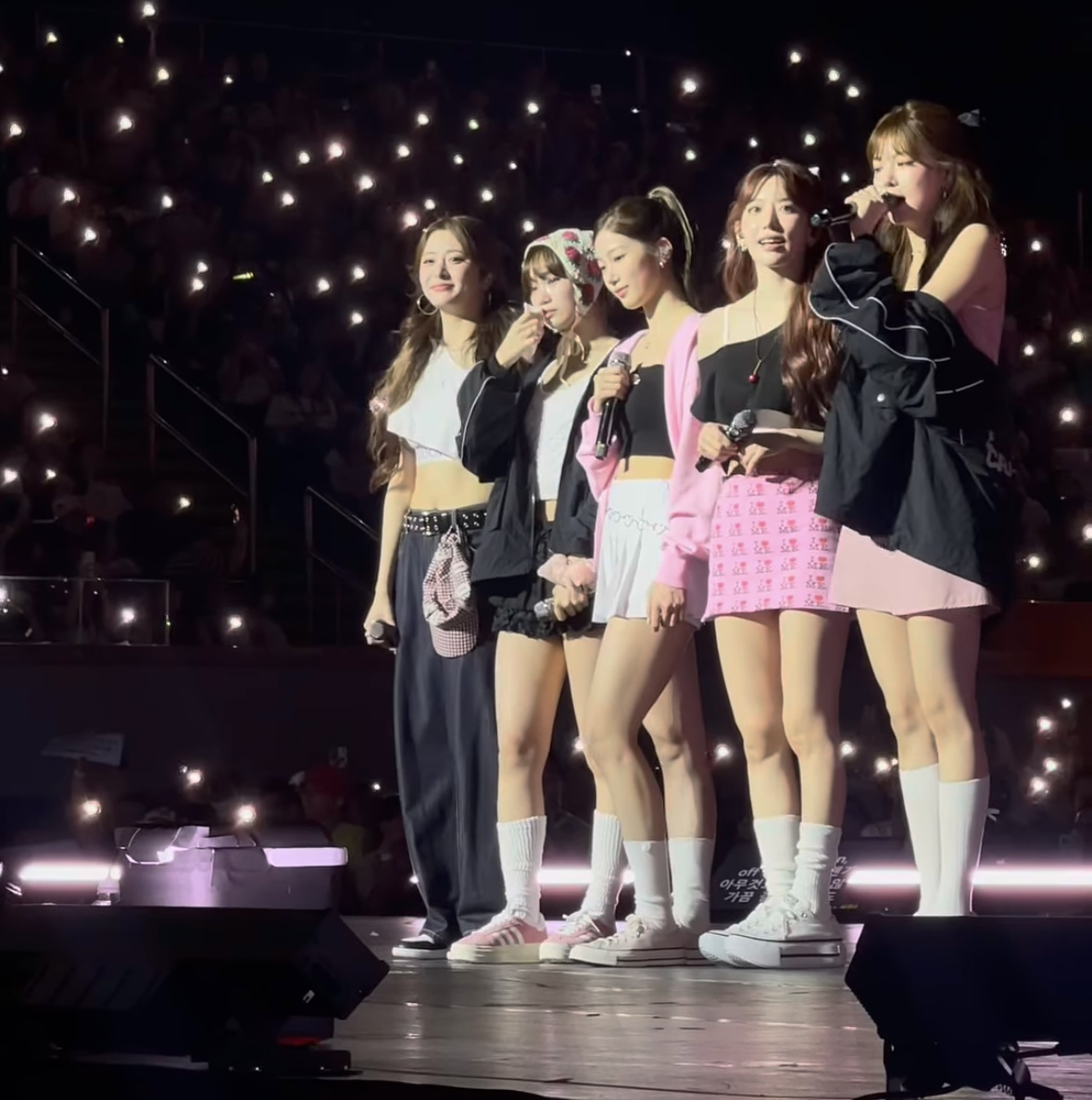
Le Sserafim during their show in Manila on August 2, 2025.

This list is taken from the Incheon show on April 19, 2025, and is not intended to be representative of all shows.

1. "Born Fire"
2. "Ash"
3. "Hot"
4. "Come Over"
5. "Good Bones"
6. "Easy" (rock ver.)
7. "Swan Song"
8. "Sour Grapes"
9. "Blue Flame"
10. "So Cynical (Badum)"
11. "Impurities"
12. "The Great Mermaid"
13. "Fire in the Belly"
14. "Smart" (remix)
15. "Chasing Lightning"
16. "Eve, Psyche & the Bluebeard's Wife"
17. "Crazy"
18. "1-800-Hot-N-Fun"
19. "Pierrot"
20. "Fearless"
21. "Burn the Bridge"
22. "Unforgiven"
23. "Antifragile"

Encore

24. "Crazier"
25. "Fearnot (Between You, Me, and the Lamppost)"
26. "Perfect Night"
27. "No Return (Into the Unknown)"

=== Notes ===
- "Different" was added to the set list beginning with the June 12 show in Saitama. The English version of the song was performed at shows outside Japan.
- "Spaghetti" was added to the setlist at the encore shows in Tokyo at Tokyo Dome.

== Tour dates ==
List of concert dates
| Date (2025) | City | Country | Venue | Attendance |
|---|---|---|---|---|
| April 19 | Incheon | South Korea | Inspire Arena | — |
| April 20 | Incheon | South Korea | Inspire Arena | — |
| May 6 | Nagoya | Japan | Nagoya International Exhibition Hall | 110,000 |
| May 7 | Nagoya | Japan | Nagoya International Exhibition Hall | 110,000 |
| May 13 | Osaka | Japan | Osaka-jō Hall | 110,000 |
| May 14 | Osaka | Japan | Osaka-jō Hall | 110,000 |
| June 7 | Kitakyushu | Japan | West Japan General Exhibition Center Annex | 110,000 |
| June 8 | Kitakyushu | Japan | West Japan General Exhibition Center Annex | 110,000 |
| June 12 | Saitama | Japan | Saitama Super Arena | 110,000 |
| June 14 | Saitama | Japan | Saitama Super Arena | 110,000 |
| June 15 | Saitama | Japan | Saitama Super Arena | 110,000 |
| July 19 | Taoyuan (Note: Labeled as Taipei in promotional material.) | Taiwan | NTSU Arena | 18,000 |
| July 20 | Taoyuan | Taiwan | NTSU Arena | 18,000 |
| July 25 | Hong Kong | | AsiaWorld–Arena | — |
| July 26 | Hong Kong | | AsiaWorld–Arena | — |
| August 2 | Pasay (Note: Labeled as Manila in promotional material.) | Philippines | SM Mall of Asia Arena | — |
| August 9 | Pak Kret (Note: Labeled as Bangkok in promotional material.) | Thailand | Thunder Dome | — |
| August 10 | Pak Kret | Thailand | Thunder Dome | — |
| August 16 | Singapore | | Singapore Indoor Stadium | 7,500 |
| September 3 | Newark | United States | Prudential Center | — |
| September 5 | Chicago | United States | Wintrust Arena | — |
| September 8 | Grand Prairie | United States | Texas Trust CU Theatre | — |
| September 12 | Inglewood | United States | Kia Forum | — |
| September 14 | San Francisco | United States | Bill Graham Civic Auditorium | 8,500 |
| September 17 | Seattle | United States | Climate Pledge Arena | — |
| September 20 | Paradise (Note: Labeled as Las Vegas in promotional material.) | United States | Michelob Ultra Arena | — |
| September 23 | Mexico City | Mexico | Arena CDMX | — |
| November 18 | Tokyo (Note: Labeled as Encore.) | Japan | Tokyo Dome | 80,000 |
| November 19 | Tokyo | Japan | Tokyo Dome | 80,000 |
| Total | | | | 237,000 |

List of concert dates
| Date (2026) | City | Country | Venue | Attendance |
|---|---|---|---|---|
| January 31 | Seoul (Note: Labeled as Encore.) | South Korea | Jamsil Indoor Stadium | — |
| February 1 | Seoul | South Korea | Jamsil Indoor Stadium | — |

=== Notes ===
- Huh Yunjin was absent from the May 6 and 7 shows in Nagoya and the May 13 and 14 shows in Osaka due to low back pain.
