= Made My Night =

- Digital cover

Single by Le Sserafim

from the album Made My Night
- Language: English
- B-side: "AEIOU"
- Released: September 11, 2026
- Genre: Dance-pop
- Length: 2:06
- Label: Source; Geffen
- Songwriters: Riley McDonough; Connor McDonough; Ryan Daly; Castle; Mae Muller; Justin Tranter; Brandon Colbein
- Producers: Riley McDonough; Connor McDonough; Ryan Daly

Le Sserafim singles chronology
"Iconic by Mistake" (2026)	"Made My Night" (2026)

Le Sserafim chronology
Pureflow Pt. 1 (2026)	Made My Night (2026)

Music video
- "Made My Night" on YouTube

"Made My Night" is a song by South Korean girl group Le Sserafim, from the group's second single album of the same name. It was released by Source Music on September 11, 2026 along with the B-side track "AEIOU". An upbeat dance-pop song, "Made My Night" is about joyously falling in love and dancing with someone special. A music video for the song, made in collaboration with the video game Overwatch, was pre-released on a day earlier, on September 10.

== Background and release ==
In June 2026, Blizzard Entertainment announced that Le Sserafim would perform at BlizzCon 2026 as the closing main-stage act. On August 28, 2026, Source Music announced that Le Sserafim would release their second single album Made My Night on September 11, 2026, posting a teaser video featuring a snippet of the title track, with the lyric "You just made my night". The promotion timetable was posted the same day. A teaser video titled "The MMN Show" was released on August 29, featuring Huh Yunjin interviewing the other members of Le Sserafim in a parody talk show. Concept photos for the "Our Delusion" CD single version were released on August 31, and the track samplers were released on September 1. The same day, it was announced by Blizzard that the music video for "Made My Night" would be part of Le Sserafim's new collaboration with Overwatch, released ahead of their BlizzCon performance. This marks the group's third collaboration with the game, after "Perfect Night" in 2023 and "So Cynical (Badum)" in 2025.

The "Chemical Night" version concept photos were released on September 2, and the "Digital Sync" compact version concept photos were released on September 3. More teaser videos and photos titled "Far from typical..." and "Pieces of that night" were released on September 3 and 4, respectively, and the group posted a Dance Dance Revolution-style video on September 6 showcasing the choreography for "Made My Night". The track listing and highlight medley for the single album were released on September 7, and the music video teaser for the title track was released on September 8. The music video for "Made My Night" was pre-released at 00:00 Korean Standard Time (UTC+9) on September 11, and the single album was released later that day alongside the performance film for the title track.

== Composition ==
"Made My Night" was written by Riley McDonough, Connor McDonough, Ryan Daly, Castle, Mae Muller, Justin Tranter and Brandon Colbein, and produced by the former three. It is an upbeat dance-pop song about the joy experienced when "falling in love and dancing with someone special". Member Hong Eunchae stated that in comparison to the group's earlier song "Perfect Night", "Made My Night" was a "more mature" song that conveys how "even the ordinary nights are perfect and complete when we are together".

The B-side "AEIOU" is a house song with an addictive melody about fearlessly jumping into love "without hiding ones feelings for someone".

== Track listing ==
Made My Night track listing
No.	Title	Writer(s)	Producer(s)	Length
1.	"Made My Night"	Riley McDonough; Connor McDonough; Ryan Daly; Castle; Mae Muller; Justin Tranter; Brandon Colbein	Ryan McDonough; Connor McDonough; Ryan Daly	2:06
2.	"AEIOU"	Hadar Adora; Rollo; Jon Santana; Her0ism; Danke; Kid Milli; Kim Chae-ah; Youra (Full8loom); Mute (PNP); Sokodomo; Lee Yi-jin; Score (13); Megatone (13)	Jon Santana; Her0ism	2:27
Total length:				4:33

Made My Night Ejae remix track listing
No.	Title	Writer(s)	Producer(s)	Length
1.	"Made My Night" (featuring Ejae)	Riley McDonough; Connor McDonough; Ryan Daly; Castle; Mae Muller; Justin Tranter; Brandon Colbein; Ejae	Ryan McDonough; Connor McDonough; Ryan Daly	2:06
2.	"Made My Night"	Riley McDonough; Connor McDonough; Ryan Daly; Castle; Mae Muller; Justin Tranter; Brandon Colbein	Ryan McDonough; Connor McDonough; Ryan Daly	2:06
Total length:				4:12

== Charts ==
=== Weekly charts ===
Weekly chart performance for "Made My Night"
Chart (2026)	Peak position
Hong Kong (Billboard)	25
Japan (Oricon)	4
Japan Combined Singles (Oricon)	8
Japan Hot 100 (Billboard)	21
New Zealand Hot Singles (RMNZ)	7
Singapore Regional (RIAS)	14
South Korea (Circle)	183
South Korean Albums (Circle)	3
Taiwan (Billboard)	18
UK Singles Sales (Official Charts)	72
US Bubbling Under Hot 100 (Billboard)	14

=== Monthly charts ===
Monthly chart performance for "Made My Night"
Chart (2026)	Peak position
Japan (Oricon)	20
South Korean Albums (Circle)	7

== Certifications ==
Certifications for "Made My Night"
Region	Certification	Certified units/sales
South Korea (KMCA) Physical	Platinum	250,000^{^}
^{^} Shipments figures based on certification alone.

== Release history ==
Release history for "Made My Night"
Region	Date	Formats	Version	Label	Ref.
Various	September 11, 2026	Digital download; streaming	Original	Source; Geffen	
United States	September 11, 2026	CD single	Original	Source; Geffen	
South Korea	September 11, 2026	CD	Original	Source; YG Plus	
Various	September 12, 2026	Digital download, streaming	Remixes	Source; Geffen	
Various	September 14, 2026	Digital download, streaming	Ejae remix	Source; Geffen	
Various	September 16, 2026	Digital download, streaming	Party remixes	Source; Geffen	
Various	October 9, 2026	CD	Original	Source; YG Plus	
