= Hong Eunchae =

South Korean singer (born 2006)

- Hong in 2026
- Born: November 10, 2006 (age 19); Miryang, South Gyeongsang, South Korea
- Occupation: Singer
- Musical career
- Genre: K-pop
- Instrument: Vocals
- Years active: 2022–present
- Label: Source
- Member of: Le Sserafim

Korean name
- Hangul: 홍은채
- RR: Hong Eunchae
- MR: Hong Ŭnch'ae

Hong Eunchae (Korean: 홍은채; born November 10, 2006) is a South Korean singer. She is a member of the South Korean girl group Le Sserafim, formed by Source Music in 2022. Outside of her group activities, she is known for having served as a regular MC of the South Korean music program Music Bank on KBS2 from February 2023 to September 2024.

== Early life and education ==
Hong Eunchae was born on November 10, 2006, in Miryang, South Gyeongsang, South Korea. She developed an interest in dance at a young age and trained at Def Dance School in South Korea for two years. She previously auditioned for JYP Entertainment and Pledis Entertainment before joining Source Music in January 2021 after passing an audition at a dance academy. She spent approximately one year and three months training prior to her debut.

== Career ==
=== 2022: Debut with Le Sserafim ===
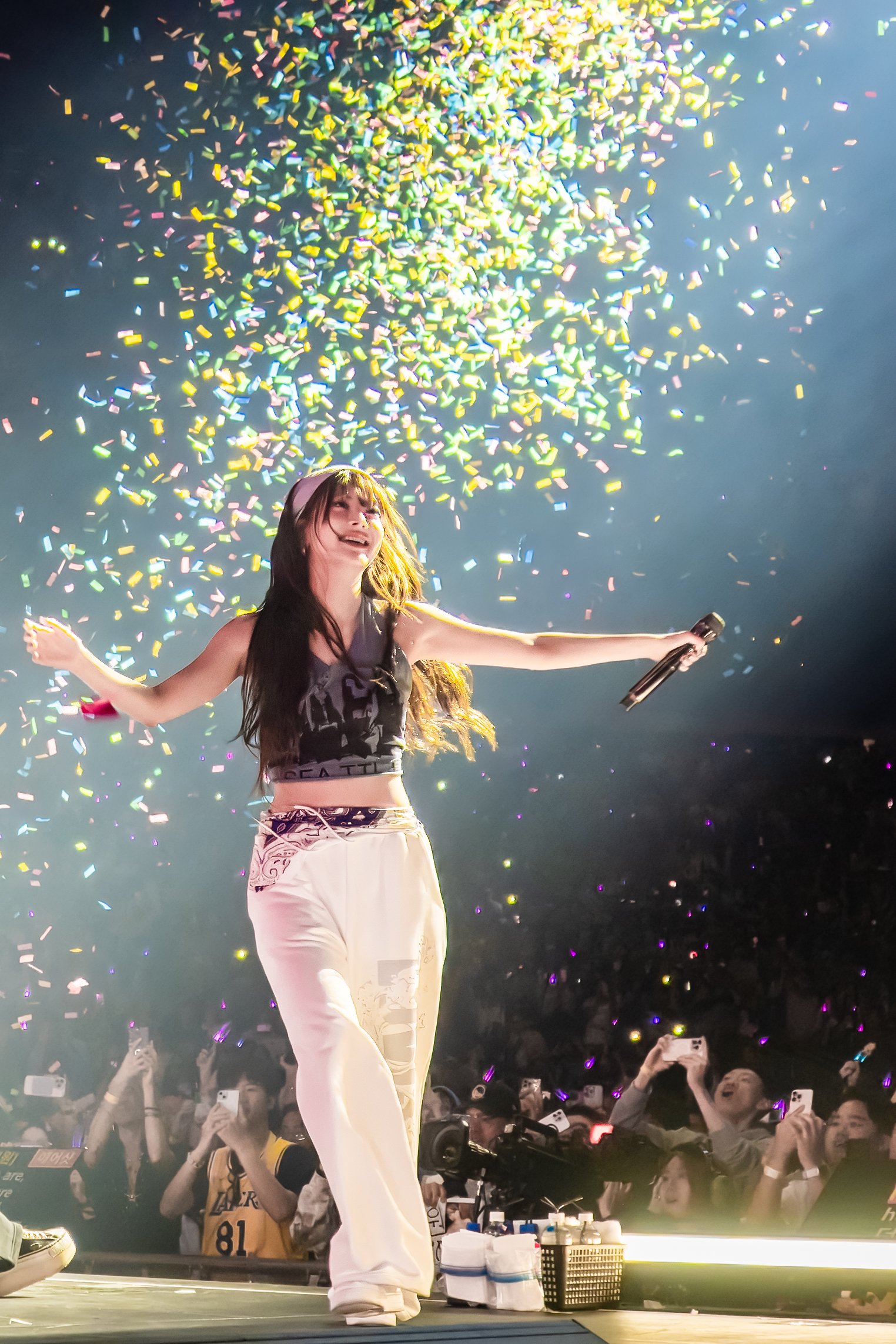
Hong performing with Le Sserafim in 2025

On April 6, 2022, Hong was revealed as a member of the girl group Le Sserafim by Source Music. The group officially debuted on May 2, 2022, with their first EP Fearless. The group initially had six members alongside Hong—Sakura, Kim Chaewon, Huh Yunjin, Kazuha, and Kim Garam—before Kim Garam departed in July 2022.

=== 2023–present: Solo activities and songwriting ===
In February 2023, Hong was announced as a new fixed MC of the South Korean music program Music Bank on KBS2, a position she held until September 2024 alongside co-host Lee Chae-min. For her work on the show, she received the Best Couple Award (shared with Lee Chae-min) and the Digital Content Award at the 2023 KBS Entertainment Awards.

Concurrent with her role as MC, Hong hosted the web variety series Eunchae's Star Diary on the KBS Kpop YouTube channel, in which she conducted interviews with K-pop artists who performed on Music Bank.

In March 2025, Hong co-wrote the track "So Cynical (Badum)" on Le Sserafim's EP Hot. In an interview, she discussed the project, stating, "The new album is special to me because I turned 20 and prepared it with a fresh start in mind".

== Endorsements ==
In February 2023, Hong was selected as a model for the South Korean clothing brand Kirsh. In July, she was announced as an ambassador for Japanese skincare brand Calamee. Hong has also modeled for Japanese fashion company Onitsuka Tiger.

== Controversy ==
In August 2024, during a showcase for Le Sserafim's EP Crazy, Hong addressed a controversy regarding a March 2023 live broadcast where she asked student fans, "You're all still in school, right? Must be tough". The comment had been criticized by some media outlets and viewers as sarcastic and insensitive. She issued a public apology at the showcase, stating, "It was a moment to communicate with fans, and I think I got too comfortable without realizing it".

== Discography ==
=== Composition credits ===
All song credits are adapted from the Korea Music Copyright Association's database, unless otherwise noted.

Title	Year	Artist	Album	Lyrics	Music
"Fearnot (Between You, Me and the Lamppost)" (피어나)	2023	Le Sserafim	Unforgiven	Yes	No
"We Got So Much"	2024	Le Sserafim	Easy	Yes	Yes
"So Cynical (Badum)"	2025	Le Sserafim	Hot	Yes	Yes
"Iffy Iffy"	2026	Le Sserafim	Pureflow Pt. 1	Yes	Yes
"Trust Exercise"	2026	Le Sserafim	Pureflow Pt. 1	Yes	Yes
"Liminal Space"	2026	Le Sserafim	Pureflow Pt. 1	Yes	No

== Filmography ==
=== Television shows ===
Year	Title	Role	Note	Ref.
2023	KBS Entertainment Awards	Special host		
2023–2024	Music Bank	MC	With Lee Chae-min (2023–2024) and Moon Sang-min (2024)	

=== Web shows ===
Year	Title	Role	Note	Ref.
2023–2024	Eunchae's Star Diary	Host	Web variety series of KBS on YouTube	

== Awards and nominations ==
Year	Award Ceremony	Category	Nominated Work	Result	Ref.
2023	KBS Entertainment Awards	Best Couple Award (with Lee Chae-min)	Music Bank	Won	
2023	KBS Entertainment Awards	Digital Content Award	Music Bank	Won	
