= Kazuha (singer) =

Japanese singer (born 2003)

- Kazuha in 2026
- Born: Kazuha Nakamura; August 9, 2003 (age 23); Osaka, Osaka Prefecture, Japan
- Education: Dutch National Ballet Academy
- Occupations: Singer; dancer
- Musical career
- Genres: K-pop; J-pop
- Instrument: Vocals
- Years active: 2022–present
- Label: Source
- Member of: Le Sserafim

Japanese name
- Kanji: 中村 一葉
- Hiragana: なかむら かずは
- Katakana: ナカムラ カズハ
- Romanization: Nakamura Kazuha

Signature
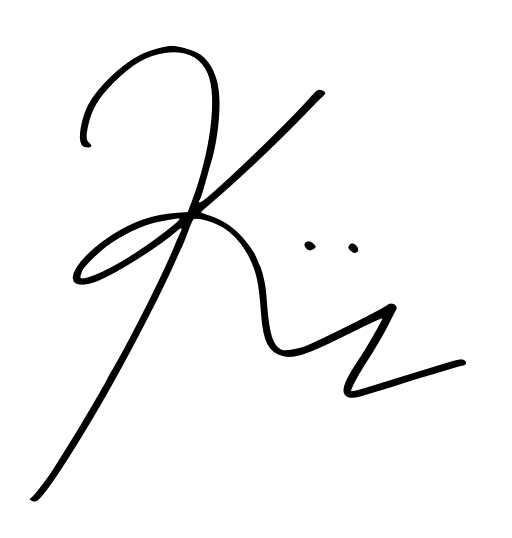

Kazuha Nakamura (Japanese: 中村 一葉, Hepburn: Nakamura Kazuha; born August 9, 2003), also known mononymously as Kazuha, is a Japanese singer and dancer based in South Korea. She is a member of the South Korean girl group Le Sserafim, formed in 2022 by Source Music.

== Early life ==
Kazuha was born on August 9, 2003 in Osaka, Osaka Prefecture, Japan. She is an only child. Starting from the age of 3 in 2006, Kazuha practiced ballet. Having danced competitively, she was a silver medalist at the Asian Grand Prix Competition - Junior's Division 2018 and champion of the Japan MIE Ballet Competition in 2016, World Dream Ballet High School in 2017, and Victoire Ballet Competition Kobe in 2019.

She attended Hashimoto Sachiyo Ballet School & Jr in Japan, Bolshoi Ballet Academy in Moscow, and the Royal Ballet School in the United Kingdom. In 2020, she was studying at the Dutch National Ballet Academy in the Netherlands before she was scouted to be a member of Le Sserafim.

== Career ==
=== Pre-debut ===
In September 2021, Kazuha applied for and passed Source Music's online audition with a performance of BTS's "Dynamite". She cited South Korean girl group Blackpink as her inspiration to transition from ballet to K-pop. After passing the audition, she was personally scouted by Big Hit Music founder Bang Si-hyuk, who traveled to the Netherlands to meet her. Dance and voice coaches from Hybe were sent to the Netherlands to work with her as she was unable to travel during the COVID-19 pandemic. She traveled to South Korea to meet and train with the other prospective members of Le Sserafim for the first time in January 2022.

=== 2022–present: Debut with Le Sserafim ===
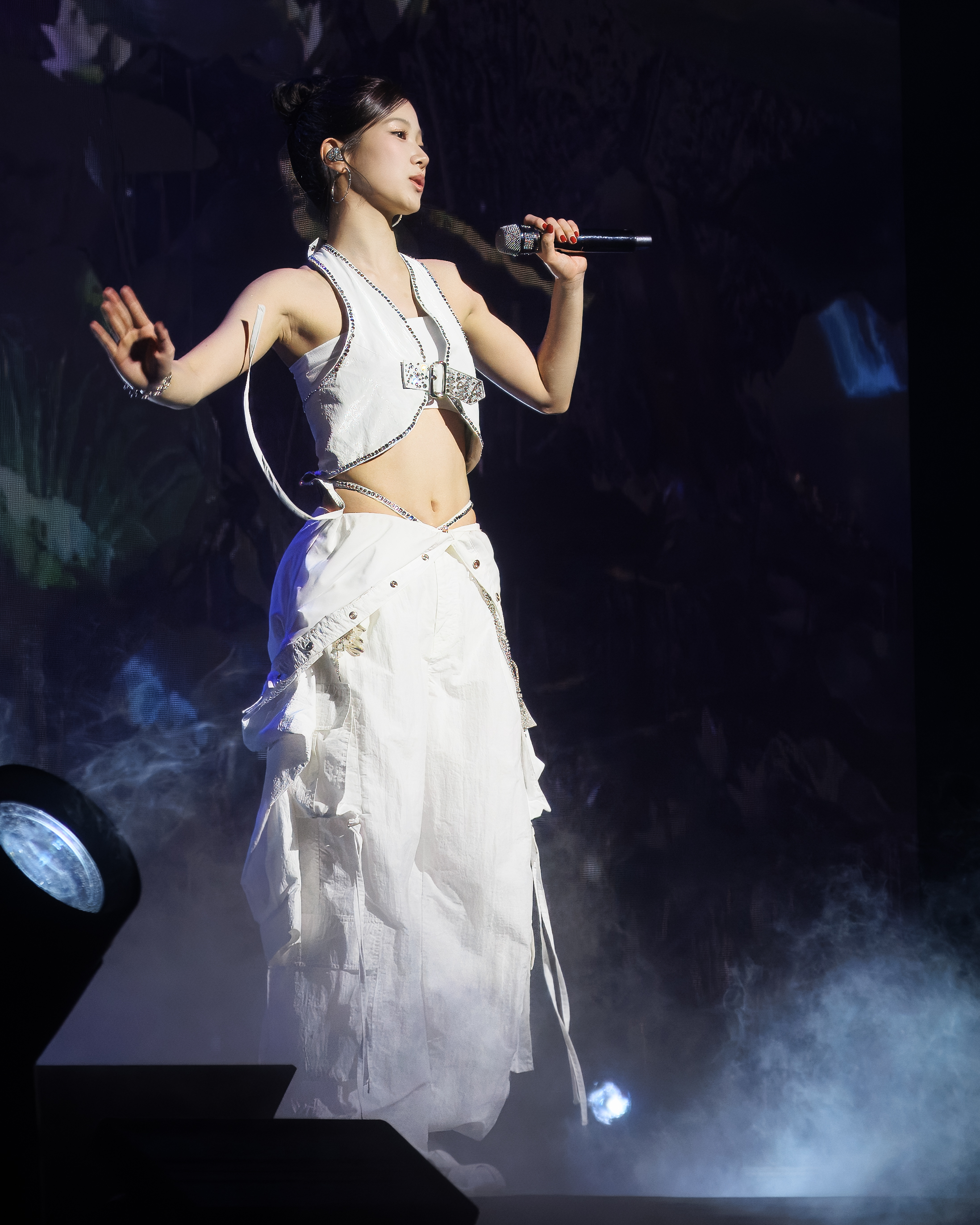
Kazuha performing with Le Sserafim in 2025

On March 14, 2022, Source Music announced that they would launch a new girl group. Kazuha was revealed as the group's 5th member on April 8. The group debuted with the EP Fearless on May 2, 2022. Following the group's debut, fancams of Kazuha's performances became popular online, and she was recognized for her unique dance style that drew on her background in ballet.

Kazuha is credited as a lyricist on the group's songs "Fearnot (Between You, Me, and the Lampost)" and "Swan Song". She additionally helped create the introductory choreography for the group's performance of "Swan Song" for their 2025 Easy Crazy Hot Tour. In December 2025, Kazuha performed a cover of "Standing Next to You" by Jung Kook at the 2025 KBS Song Festival, receiving praise for her strong stage presence and choreography. On February 26, 2026, Kazuha was announced as a cast member of the second season of Kian's Bizarre B&B, which premiered on September 22.

== Endorsements ==
Kazuha has been named as an ambassador and campaign model for multiple cosmetics brands. In 2022, she was named a brand ambassador for Etude House, and in 2025, she was named an ambassador for the Shinsegae brand VIDIVICI during its global brand expansion. In 2024, she appeared as a model in domestic campaign ads for Lancôme's new Tient Idole foundation, attended the brand's pop-up store in Seoul, and appeared in Elle Korea to promote the brand. Additionally, Kazuha served as a brand muse for the hair care brand Lador from 2023 to 2025. In 2026, she served as a campaign model for Thome's Twenty Up ultrasonic skincare device.

Kazuha has additionally appeared in campaigns and promotions for fashion brands such as Calvin Klein and Polo Ralph Lauren. In May 2025, Kazuha was announced as an ambassador for Lululemon's "Live Like You Are Alive" campaign.

== Discography ==
=== Composition credits ===
All song credits are adapted from the Korea Music Copyright Association's database, unless otherwise noted.

List of songs, showing year released, artist name, and name of the album
Title	Year	Artist	Album	Lyrics	Music
"Fearnot (Between You, Me and the Lamppost)" (피어나)	2023	Le Sserafim	Unforgiven	Yes	No
"Swan Song"	2024	Le Sserafim	Easy	Yes	Yes
"Trust Exercise"	2026	Le Sserafim	Pureflow Pt. 1	Yes	Yes
"Liminal Space"	2026	Le Sserafim	Pureflow Pt. 1	Yes	No

== Filmography ==
=== Television shows ===
Year	Title	Role	Notes	Ref.
2026	Kian's Bizarre B&B	Cast member	Season 2	

=== Live performances ===
Year	Title	Performed song(s)	Ref.
2025	KBS Song Festival	"Standing Next to You"; Jung Kook cover	

== Awards and nominations ==
Name of the award ceremony, year presented, category, nominee of the award, and the result of the nomination
Award ceremony	Year	Category	Nominee / work	Result	Ref.
3rd Biwako Western Dance Competition	2017	Middle School Division	"Sleeping Beauty Act 3 Aurora Va"	Won	
International Ballet Competition Asian Grand Prix	2018	Junior B Division	"Princess Florina's Va"	2nd	
Japan MIE Ballet Competition	2016	J1A Category	"Esmeralda Va"	Won	
Kobe National Western Dance Competition	2018	Women's Junior 2nd Division	"Esmeralda Va"	Won	
Victoire Ballet Competition Kobe	2019	Junior High School Division	"Queen of the Forest Va"	Won	
World Dream Ballet Competition	2017	Junior High School Division	"Esmeralda Va"	Won	
