= List of Billboard Japan Hot Albums number ones of 2022 =

The following is a list of weekly number-one albums on the Billboard Japan Hot Albums chart in 2022.

== Chart history ==
Issue date	Song	Artist(s)	Ref.
January 3	Universe	NCT	
January 10	Universe	NCT	
January 17	City	SixTones	
January 24	Dimension: Answer	Enhypen	
January 31	Next Destination	Takuya Kimura	
February 7	Kyōgen	Ado	
February 14	Kyōgen	Ado	
February 21	Kimi wa Saki e Iku	Yunho	
February 28	Nobi Shigusa Korite Itomagoi	Zutomayo	
March 7	Bad Mode	Hikaru Utada	
March 14	The Second Step: Chapter One	Treasure	
March 21	Mixed Juice	Johnny's West	
March 28	#Twice4	Twice	
April 4	Love All Serve All	Fujii Kaze	
April 11	Honey	KAT-TUN	
April 18	Macross 40th Anniversary Chō Jikū Collaboration Album Deculture!! Mixture!!!!!	Sheryl and Ranka of Walküre	
April 25	Crack Up!!!!	ROF-MAO	
May 2	Terzo	Juice=Juice	
May 9	Last Album	Last Idol	
May 16	Fearless	Le Sserafim	
May 23	Mr. Children 2015–2021 & Now	Mr. Children	
May 30	Minisode 2: Thursday's Child	Tomorrow X Together	
June 6	Kizuna	JO1	
June 13	The Highlight	Sexy Zone	
June 20	Face the Sun	Seventeen	
June 27	Proof	BTS	
July 4	Circus	Stray Kids	
July 11	Made In	King & Prince	
July 18	Toni9ht	Urashimasakatasen	
July 25	1st Love	Naniwa Danshi	
August 1	Manifesto: Day 1	Enhypen	
August 8	Sector 17	Seventeen	
August 15	As You Know?	Sakurazaka46	
August 22	Uta's Songs: One Piece Film Red	Ado	
August 29	Ongaku	NEWS	
September 5	Filmusic!	Hey! Say! JUMP	
September 12	Be:1	Be First	
September 19	Luxury Disease	One Ok Rock	
September 26	Hitotsuboshi: Galileo Collection 2007–2022	Ko Shibasaki	
October 3	Snow Labo. S2	Snow Man	
October 10	Snow Labo. S2	Snow Man	
October 17	Yuming Banzai!: 50th Anniversary Best Album	Yumi Matsutoya	
October 24	Yuming Banzai!: 50th Anniversary Best Album	Yumi Matsutoya	
October 31	Antifragile	Le Sserafim	
November 7	Sadame	Enhypen	
November 14	Sadame	Enhypen	
November 21	Dream	Seventeen	
November 28	Dream	Seventeen	
December 5	Itsumo Dokoka de	Keisuke Kuwata	
December 12	The World EP.Paradigm	Ateez	
December 19	First Howling: Me	&Team	
December 26	Awakening	INI	

== See also ==
- List of Hot 100 number-one singles of 2022 (Japan)
