= Antifragile (EP) =

- Digital and "Vol.1 Midnight Onyx" version cover

EP by Le Sserafim
- Released: October 17, 2022
- Recorded: 2022
- Studios: Hybe Studio (Yongsan, Seoul)
- Length: 13:26
- Language: Korean
- Labels: Source; YG Plus; Geffen
- Producers: "Hitman" Bang; 13; Sir Nolan; Alex Bilowitz

Le Sserafim chronology
Fearless (2022)	Antifragile (2022)	Unforgiven (2023)

Singles from Antifragile
- 1. "Antifragile" Released: October 17, 2022

Antifragile is the second extended play by South Korean girl group Le Sserafim, released by Source Music on October 17, 2022. It contains five tracks, including the lead single of the same name. Antifragile marks their first release as a quintet, following the departure of Kim Ga-ram in July 2022.

The album debuted at number two on the Circle Album Chart and was certified million by the Korea Music Content Association (KMCA) for selling 1,000,000 units. In the United States, it debuted at number 14 on the Billboard 200, becoming the group's first entry on the chart.

== Background and release ==
On September 1, it was revealed that Le Sserafim would be making their first comeback with new music in the fall. Through a short video clip published on September 19, Le Sserafim announced the title and release date of their upcoming extended play (EP). Source Music then shared the EP's physical release details on social media platforms. Three sets of concept photos titled "Midnight Onyx", "Iridescent Opal" and "Frozen Aquamarine" were also revealed in the weeks leading up to the release of Antifragile. The track samplers and track list were released on October 3 and 4, respectively. The music video for the lead single was released prior to the EP.

== Composition ==
The EP contains five songs, including the lead single of the same name, "Antifragile". Member Huh Yun-jin participated in the songwriting process of the third, fourth, and fifth tracks. In addition, member Sakura participated in writing and composing the fifth track.

The record opens with "bass-heavy" intro, "The Hydra". The track references a "mythological creature", where each member speaks in their native language. The second track, "Antifragile", is described as an "Afro-Latin style" pop song with a "heavy" Latin rhythm. The lyrics of the song convey the message that difficult times are stimulus for growth and that with this mindset, they will become stronger. It is followed by "Impurities", which is described as a "sophisticated" R&B track. The fourth track, "No Celestial", is a punk-pop song, characterized with heavy guitar sound. The lyrics are "all about embracing their flaws". The closing track "Good Parts (When the Quality Is Bad but I Am)", is another R&B track, where the members sing about finding "true courage in embracing one's flaws".

== Awards and nominations ==
Awards and nominations for Antifragile
Year	Ceremony	Award	Result	Ref.
2023	Circle Chart Music Awards	New Artist of the Year – Physical	Nominated	
2023	Korean Music Awards	Best K-pop Album	Nominated	

== Commercial performance and reception ==
Professional ratings
Review scores
Source	Rating
AllMusic	4/5 stars
IZM	2/5 stars
NME	4/5 stars

Following the commencement of pre-orders on September 19, the album sold more than 400,000 copies within a week. As of October 6, Antifragile had sold 560,000 copies, and as of October 14, it surpassed 600,000 copies.

== Promotion ==
On the day Antifragile was released, Le Sserafim hosted a live showcase on Mnet to introduce the extended play and to communicate with their fans. "Antifragile", "Impurities", "No Celestial", and "Good Parts (When the Quality Is Bad but I Am)" were all performed at the showcase.

== Track listing ==
Track listing for Antifragile
No.	Title	Writer(s)	Producer(s)	Length
1.	"The Hydra"	Score (13); Megatone (13); Hybe	13	1:44
2.	"Antifragile"	Score (13); Megatone (13); Paulina "Pau" Cerrilla; "Hitman" Bang; Shintaro Yasuda; Supreme Boi; Isabella Lovestory; Kyler Niko; Ronnie Icon; Nathalie Boone; Danke (Lalala Studio)	13	3:04
3.	"Impurities"	Score (13); Megatone (13); Jonna Hall; Danke (Lalala Studio); "Hitman" Bang; Huh Yunjin; Daniel "Obi" Klein; Charli Taft; Kim Chae-ah; Maggie Szabo; Hayes Kramer; Blvsh; Jaro; Nikolay Mohr; Park Sang-yu; Cho Yoon-kyung; Lee Hyung Seok (PNP)	13	3:16
4.	"No Celestial"	Score (13); Megatone (13); Danke (Lalala Studio); Cazzi Opeia; Ellen Berg; Kim In-hyung; Ronnie Icon; YoungChance; TK; Shorelle; Julia Bognar Finnseter; Nermin Harambašić; Poutyface; Park Sang-yu; Huh Yunjin	13	2:46
5.	"Good Parts (When the Quality Is Bad but I Am)"	Sir Nolan; Alex Bilowitz; Jenna Andrews; Salem Ilese; Danke (Lalala Studio); Sakura Miyawaki; Cha Yu-bin; Score (13); Megatone (13); Huh Yunjin	Sir Nolan; Alex Bilowitz	2:36
Total length:				13:26

== Credits and personnel ==
Credits adapted from the EP liner notes.

=== Musicians ===
- Le Sserafim – vocals (all tracks)
- Score (13) – production, keyboard (tracks 1–4); drums (tracks 2–4); digital editing, vocal arrangement (all tracks)
- Megatone (13) – production (tracks 1–4); bass, guitar (tracks 2–4); digital editing, vocal arrangement (all tracks)
- Alex Bilowitz – production, guitar, keyboard, strings (track 5)
- Sir Nolan – production (track 5)
- Nolan Lambroza – bass, drum programming, keyboard (track 5)
- Lee Won-jong – vocal arrangement, digital editing, additional programming (track 5)
- Isabella Lovestory – background vocals (track 2)
- Paulina Cerrilla – background vocals (track 2)
- Chrali Taft – background vocals (track 3)
- Jonna Hall – background vocals (track 3)
- Nathalie Boone – background vocals (track 4)
- Shorelle – background vocals (track 4)
- Cazzi Opeia – background vocals (track 4)
- Ellen Berg – background vocals (track 4)
- Young Chance – background vocals (track 4)

=== Technical ===
- Geoff Swan – mixing (track 1)
- Manny Marroquin – mixing (track 2)
- Chris Galland – mixing (track 2)
- Tony Maserati – mixing (track 3)
- David K. Younghyun – mixing (track 3)
- Adam Hawkins – mixing (track 4)
- Yang Ga – mixing (track 5)
- Chris Gehringer – mastering
- Kim Hyeon-soo – recording engineering (tracks 1, 4, 5)
- Lee Yeon-soo – recording engineering (tracks 2–5)
- Hwang Min-hee – recording engineering (tracks 2–4)
- Ramiro Fernandez-Seoane – mixing assistance (track 2)
- Henry Lunetta – mixing assistance (track 4)

== Charts ==
=== Weekly charts ===
Chart performance for Antifragile
Chart (2022–2023)	Peak position
Austrian Albums (Ö3 Austria)	31
Belgian Albums (Ultratop Flanders)	34
Belgian Albums (Ultratop Wallonia)	37
Croatian International Albums (HDU)	5
French Albums (SNEP)	32
German Albums (Offizielle Top 100)	37
Greek Albums (IFPI)	14
Hungarian Albums (MAHASZ)	19
Japanese Albums (Oricon)	1
Japanese Combined Albums (Oricon)	1
Japanese Hot Albums (Billboard Japan)	1
South Korean Albums (Circle)	2
Spanish Albums (Promusicae)	53
Swiss Albums (Schweizer Hitparade)	15
US Billboard 200	14
US World Albums (Billboard)	1

=== Monthly charts ===
Monthly chart performance for Antifragile
Chart (2022)	Peak position
Japanese Albums (Oricon)	5
South Korean Albums (Circle)	3

=== Year-end charts ===
2022 year-end chart performance for Antifragile
Chart (2022)	Position
Japanese Albums (Oricon)	65
Japanese Hot Albums (Billboard Japan)	82
South Korean Albums (Circle)	26

2023 year-end chart performance for Antifragile
Chart (2023)	Position
South Korean Albums (Circle)	78

== Sales and certifications ==
Sales and certifications for Antifragile
Region	Certification	Certified units/sales
Japan	—	72,826
South Korea (KMCA)	Million	1,081,332

== Release history ==
Release history for Antifragile
Region	Date	Format	Label
Various	October 17, 2022	Digital download; streaming	Source Music; YG Plus
South Korea	October 17, 2022	CD	Source Music; YG Plus
Various	October 21, 2022	CD	Source Music; Geffen
South Korea	July 10, 2026	NFC	Source Music; YG Plus

== See also ==
- Fearless (EP)
- List of Billboard Japan Hot Albums number ones of 2022
