= Crazy (Le Sserafim EP) =

- Digital cover

EP by Le Sserafim
- Released: August 30, 2024
- Length: 14:52
- Languages: Korean; English
- Labels: Source; YG Plus; Geffen
- Producers: 13; Iluvjulia; "Hitman" Bang; BloodPop; AOBeats; Huh Yunjin

Le Sserafim chronology
Easy (2024)	Crazy (2024)	Hot (2025)

Singles from Crazy
- 1. "Crazy" Released: August 30, 2024

Crazy is the fourth extended play by South Korean girl group Le Sserafim. It was released by Source Music on August 30, 2024, and contains five tracks including the lead single of the same name. The EP contains several styles of music, including EDM, house, rock, and hip hop.

== Background and release ==
On August 5, 2024, Source Music announced that Le Sserafim would be releasing their fourth extended play (EP) titled Crazy, with pre-orders being made available at Target, Weverse Shop, and other retailers; a schedule for the group's promotional activities was also released. The group had previously teased the EP's title in the music video for "Smart", with the word "Crazy" written on a cup in one scene of the video. Prior to the EP's announcement, the group previewed the track "1-800-Hot-N-Fun" during their performance at Coachella on April 13, 2024. It was later confirmed to be a track on the EP and that American producer BloodPop worked on the song. During the August 15 episode of Eunchae Star Diary, Le Sserafim member Hong Eun-chae talked about the group's upcoming release, describing the title track as being similar to their previous single "Antifragile". In an interview with NME, the group explained that the project would explore "the struggles of loving something so much that you would do anything for it".

The comeback trailer "Chasing Lightning" was released on August 13, with track samplers being released the following day. Concept images for the different versions of the album were revealed from August 16 to 19. The track list was revealed on August 22, with Le Sserafim member Huh Yunjin revealed to have worked on the writing and production of the final track "Crazier". The highlight medley for the album was released the following day, and the track list was re-uploaded with Huh Yunjin and Sakura now credited on the title track. This was followed by two music video teasers for "Crazy" on August 28 and 29. The EP was released along with the music video for the title track on August 30, 2024.

== Composition ==
Crazy contains various genres ranging from EDM and house, to rock and hip-hop. The intro track "Chasing Lightning" contains a techno-style instrumental with the narration "We can't change the weather, but we just chase lightning". The title track "Crazy" is described as an EDM-based house song with lyrics about the emotions someone feels when "they meet someone that drives them crazy". "Pierrot" is a hip-hop song that samples Kim Wan-sun's song "Pierrot Smiling at Us", with parts of the track "hidden throughout the [former's] melody and theme". The English track "1-800-Hot-N-Fun", which was produced by American producer BloodPop, is a rock song with hip-hop elements that contain "intense guitar riffs" and "rhythmic rap" from the members. The closing track "Crazier", produced by Huh Yunjin, explores the group's tender side, with a message that "inspires listeners to wholeheartedly embrace and love things that make their heart race".

== Promotion ==
Prior to the EP's release, Le Sserafim posted a dance challenge video to their social media on August 23, showcasing the voguing choreography for the title track. To celebrate the release of the EP, Source Music hosted an album release party in Seoul on August 29 and 30, featuring photo exhibitions and a listening session with commentary from the members, while Geffen Records hosted a release party in Los Angeles on August 30. The group embarked on the Easy Crazy Hot Tour in 2025 to promote the EP along with their other EPs, Easy (2024) and Hot (2025).

== Critical reception ==
Professional ratings
Review scores
Source	Rating
AllMusic	3/5 stars

David Crone of AllMusic called the album "a notably more foot-forward release" than the group's past works and opined that "Crazy" was "destined to become a club staple." Han Seong-hyeon of IZM awarded the album 2 out of five stars, criticizing the songs' lyrics and unfavorably comparing the album to Western music including Taylor Swift's album Reputation (2017) and Ariana Grande's song "Yes, And?" (2024).

== Track listing ==
Crazy standard edition
No.	Title	Writer(s)	Producer(s)	Length
1.	"Chasing Lightning"	Score (13); Megatone (13); Hybe	13	3:25
2.	"Crazy"	Score (13); Megatone (13); Iluvjulia; "Hitman" Bang; Leven Kali; JBach; Jake Torrey; Supreme Boi; Anthony Watts; Amanda "Kiddo A.I." Ibanez; Huh Yunjin; Sakura	13; Iluvjulia; "Hitman" Bang	2:44
3.	"Pierrot"	Score (13); Megatone (13); Supreme Boi; "Hitman" Bang; Martin	13; "Hitman" Bang	2:50
4.	"1-800-Hot-N-Fun"	BloodPop; Omer Fedi; AOBeats; Mark Johns; "Hitman" Bang; Score (13); Megatone (13)	BloodPop; AOBeats	2:53
5.	"Crazier" (미치지 못하는 이유; Michiji mothaneun iyu; 'The reason why I can't reach it')	Huh Yunjin; Score (13); Megatone (13); "Hitman" Bang	Huh Yunjin; 13	2:58
Total length:				14:52

Crazy (Voice Memo version) limited edition digital bonus tracks
No.	Title	Writer(s)	Producer(s)	Length
6.	"Crazy Episode 1" (voice memo)	Score (13); Megatone (13); Iluvjulia; "Hitman" Bang; Leven Kali; JBach; Jake Torrey; Supreme Boi; Anthony Watts; Amanda "Kiddo A.I." Ibanez; Huh Yunjin; Sakura	13; Iluvjulia; "Hitman" Bang
7.	"Crazy Episode 2" (voice memo)	Score (13); Megatone (13); Iluvjulia; "Hitman" Bang; Leven Kali; JBach; Jake Torrey; Supreme Boi; Anthony Watts; Amanda "Kiddo A.I." Ibanez; Huh Yunjin; Sakura	13; Iluvjulia; "Hitman" Bang

Notes

- "Pierrot" contains a sample of "Pierrot Smiling at Us", written by Son Moo-hyun and Lee Seung-ho, and performed by Kim Wan-sun.

== Personnel ==
Musicians

- Le Sserafim – lead vocals
  - Huh Yunjin – production, vocal arrangement (5)
- Score (13) – production, drums (1–3, 5); keyboards (all tracks), vocal arrangement (1, 2, 4), digital editing (1–4)
- Megatone (13) – production, bass (1–3, 5); guitar (all tracks), vocal arrangement (1, 2, 4), digital editing (1–4)
- Iluvjulia – production, drums, synthesizer (2)
- BloodPop – production, bass, drums, keyboards (4)
- AOBeats – production, bass, drums, keyboards (4)
- Omer Fedi – guitar (4)
- Jake Torrey – background vocals (2)
- Martin – background vocals (3)
- Mark Johns – background vocals (4)
- Sound Kim – background vocals (5)
- Supreme Boi – vocal arrangement (3)
- Kim Jun-hyeok – digital editing (5), vocal arrangement (4, 5)

Technical

- Kevin Grainger – mix engineering (1)
- Geoff Swan – mix engineering (2)
- Clint Gibbs – mix engineering (3)
- Austin Seltzer – mix engineering (4)
- Yang Ga – mix engineering (5)
- Chris Gehringer – mastering
- Hwang min-hee – engineering
- Kim Min-jun – engineering (2, 4)
- Lee Yeon-soo – engineering (2, 3)
- Teok Hyeon-gwan – engineering (2)
- Lee Pyeong-uk – engineering (4)
- Matt Cahill – mix engineering assistance (2)
- Zach Szydlo – Atmos mixing engineer

== Charts ==
=== Weekly charts ===
Weekly chart performance for Crazy
Chart (2024)	Peak position
Austrian Albums (Ö3 Austria)	28
Belgian Albums (Ultratop Flanders)	29
Belgian Albums (Ultratop Wallonia)	116
Canadian Albums (Billboard)	81
Croatian International Albums (HDU)	3
French Albums (SNEP)	24
German Albums (Offizielle Top 100)	25
Greek Albums (IFPI)	5
Hungarian Physical Albums (MAHASZ)	8
Japanese Albums (Oricon)	2
Japanese Combined Albums (Oricon)	2
Japanese Hot Albums (Billboard Japan)	2
New Zealand Albums (RMNZ)	26
South Korean Albums (Circle)	2
US Billboard 200	7
US World Albums (Billboard)	1

=== Monthly charts ===
Monthly chart performance for Crazy
Chart (2024)	Peak position
Japanese Albums (Oricon)	4
South Korean Albums (Circle)	2

=== Year-end charts ===
Year-end chart performance for Crazy
Chart (2024)	Position
Japanese Albums (Oricon)	39
Japanese Hot Albums (Billboard Japan)	45
South Korean Albums (Circle)	30

== Certifications ==
Certifications for "Crazy"
Region	Certification	Certified units/sales
South Korea (KMCA)	3× Platinum	750,000^{^}
^{^} Shipments figures based on certification alone.

== Release history ==
Release history for Crazy
Region	Date	Format	Label	Ref.
Various	August 30, 2024	CD; digital download; streaming	Source; YG Plus; Geffen	
South Korea	September 14, 2025	Vinyl LP	Source; YG Plus	
South Korea	July 10, 2026	NFC	Source; YG Plus	
