= Hot (Le Sserafim EP) =

- Digital cover

EP by Le Sserafim
- Released: March 14, 2025
- Studio: Hybe Studio (Seoul)
- Length: 12:48
- Language: Korean; English
- Label: Source; YG Plus; Geffen
- Producer: 13; Jackson Shanks; J Lloyd; Lydia Kitto; Lostboy; Mark Schick; Vitals

Le Sserafim chronology
Crazy (2024)	Hot (2025)	Spaghetti (2025)

Singles from Hot
- 1. "Hot" Released: March 14, 2025

Hot is the fifth extended play by South Korean girl group Le Sserafim. It was released on March 14, 2025, by Source Music and contains five tracks, including the lead single of the same name. The EP incorporates pop, rock, disco, retro, nu jazz, Jersey club and house stylings, and contains a song made in collaboration with the British band Jungle. The group embarked on the Easy Crazy Hot Tour in 2025 to promote the EP along with their previous two EPs, Easy (2024) and Crazy (2024).

== Background and release ==
On February 16, 2025, Source Music announced that Le Sserafim would release their fifth extended play, Hot, on March 14 with the album's promotion timetable released the following day. It was revealed that the group had collaborated with the British band Jungle for the EP, who said that the group "adds a special charm to our production styles". The album trailer "Born Fire" was released on February 21, followed by concept photos released on February 24 to 28. Track samples were released on March 3, and the track listing was revealed the following day, on March 4, with Jungle revealed to have worked on the song "Come Over". The highlight medley was released on March 7, and two music video teasers for the lead single were released on March 12 and 13. Hot was released alongside the music video for the lead single on March 14.

== Composition ==
Hot contains five songs about being willing to jump into what you love with no hesitation, no matter the outcome. The intro track "Born Fire" narrates a story of a flame burning, dying out, turning to ashes and being rekindled. The lead single "Hot" is a pop song with rock and disco elements that expresses how you'll sacrifice everything for someone you love, even if you don't know where it will lead. The third track "Come Over" is a retro-sounding dreamy nu jazz song that was co-written and produced by J Lloyd and Lydia Kitto of the British band Jungle. The fourth track "Ash" is a dreamy song with a mysterious atmosphere about accepting pain and finding beauty in it, and the closing track "So Cynical (Badum)", co-written by Le Sserafim members Huh Yunjin, Kim Chaewon and Hong Eunchae, features a Jersey club and house beat with lyrics about not hesitating to boldly pursue love.

== Promotion ==
On March 10, a snippet of "So Cynical (Badum)" was previewed in a teaser video for Le Sserafim's collaboration with Overwatch 2. The group held a comeback showcase on March 13 and, following the release on March 14, two pop-up stores called "The Hot House" were opened in Seoul and Tokyo from March 14 to 30. To promote the EP, Le Sserafim embarked on the Easy Crazy Hot Tour, which is also in support of their previous two EPs, Easy (2024) and Crazy (2024).

== Critical reception ==
Professional ratings
Review scores
Source	Rating
IZM	2.5/5 stars
NME	4/5 stars

Gladys Yeo of NME awarded the EP 4 stars out of five, calling it "true to Le Sserafim's ethos of unfaltering courage" and praising "Ash" as "a masterclass in atmospheric, moody pop". Shin Dong-gyu of IZM awarded the EP 2.5 stars out of 5, praising "Come Over" and "Ash" but opining that its production was derivative of other modern idol music.

== Track listing ==
Hot track listing
No.	Title	Writer(s)	Producer(s)	Length
1.	"Born Fire"	Score (13); Megatone (13); Hybe	13	2:16
2.	"Hot"	Jackson Shanks; Supreme Boi; Ali Tamposi; Feli Ferraro; Score (13); Megatone (13); "Hitman" Bang; Huh Yunjin	13; Jackson Shanks	2:23
3.	"Come Over"	J Lloyd; Lydia Kitto; Score (13); Megatone (13)	J Lloyd; Lydia Kitto; 13	2:17
4.	"Ash"	Peter Rycroft; Mark Schick; Casey Smith; Boy Matthews; Huh Yunjin; "Hitman" Bang; Score (13); Megatone (13); Junhyuk; Danke; Baek Sae-im (PNP)	Lostboy; Mark Schick	3:17
5.	"So Cynical (Badum)"	Ejae; Vitals; Anthony Watts; Huh Yunjin; "Hitman" Bang; Hong Eunchae; Kim Chaewon	Vitals	2:35
Total length:				12:48

== Personnel ==
=== Musicians ===
- Le Sserafim – vocals
  - Huh Yunjin – background vocals (4)
  - Kim Chaewon – background vocals (4)
- Score (13) – production (1–3), keyboards (1–3), drums (1, 2), vocal arrangement(1–3, 5), digital editing (1, 4)
- Megatone (13) – production (1–3), bass (1–3), guitar (1, 2), vocal arrangement (1–3, 5), digital editing (1, 4)
- Jackson Shanks – production, guitar, drums, synthesizer (2)
- Kim Jun-hyuk – digital editing (2, 5), vocal arrangement (3, 5)
- Feli Ferraro – background vocals (2)
- J Lloyd – production, keyboards, guitar, drums, digital editing (3)
- Lydia Kitto – production, keyboards, guitar, bass, background vocals, vocal arrangement (3)
- Lostboy – production, keyboards, bass, drums (4)
- Mark Schick – production, guitar (4)
- Casey Smith – background vocals (4)
- Boy Matthews – background vocals (4)
- Sarah Troy – background vocals (4)
- Vitals – production, keyboards, guitar, drums, programming, synthesizer (5)
- Ejae – background vocals (5)

=== Technical ===
- Geoff Swan – mixing (1, 5)
- Matt Cahill – mixing assistance (1, 5)
- Jongpil Gu – mixing (2)
- Timothy Shann – mixing (3)
- Tom Norris – mixing (4)
- Chris Gehringer – mastering
- Hwang Min-hee – recording (1, 2, 4)
- Lee Dong-geun – recording (2–5)
- Kim Min-jun – recording (3)
- Kim Hyun-soo – recording (3, 5)
- J Lloyd – recording (3)

== Charts ==
=== Weekly charts ===
Weekly chart performance for Hot
Chart (2025)	Peak position
Austrian Albums (Ö3 Austria)	33
Belgian Albums (Ultratop Flanders)	69
Belgian Albums (Ultratop Wallonia)	78
Croatian International Albums (HDU)	8
Greek Albums (IFPI)	3
Hungarian Physical Albums (MAHASZ)	12
Japanese Albums (Oricon)	2
Japanese Combined Albums (Oricon)	2
Japanese Hot Albums (Billboard Japan)	6
New Zealand Albums (RMNZ)	27
Portuguese Albums (AFP)	68
South Korean Albums (Circle)	1
Spanish Albums (Promusicae)	97
Swiss Albums (Schweizer Hitparade)	75
US Billboard 200	9
US World Albums (Billboard)	1

=== Monthly charts ===
Monthly chart performance for Hot
Chart (2025)	Position
Japanese Albums (Oricon)	6
South Korean Albums (Circle)	3

=== Year-end charts ===
Year-end chart performance for Hot
Chart (2025)	Position
Japanese Albums (Oricon)	63
Japanese Hot Albums (Billboard Japan)	85
South Korean Albums (Circle)	32

== Certifications ==
Certifications for Hot
Region	Certification	Certified units/sales
South Korea (KMCA)	2× Platinum	500,000^{^}
Japan (RIAJ)	Gold	100,000^{^}
^{^} Shipments figures based on certification alone.

== Release history ==
Release history for Hot
Region	Date	Format	Label	Ref.
Various	March 14, 2025	CD; digital download; streaming	Source; YG Plus; Geffen	
South Korea	September 14, 2025	Vinyl LP	Source; YG Plus	
South Korea	July 10, 2026	NFC	Source; YG Plus	
