= Hot (Le Sserafim song) =

- English version single cover

Single by Le Sserafim

from the EP Hot
- Language: Korean; English
- Released: March 14, 2025
- Studio: Hybe Studio (Seoul)
- Genre: Pop; disco; rock
- Length: 2:23
- Label: Source; Geffen
- Songwriters: Jackson Shanks; Supreme Boi; Ali Tamposi; Feli Ferraro; Score (13); Megatone (13); "Hitman" Bang; Huh Yunjin
- Producers: 13; Jackson Shanks

Le Sserafim singles chronology
| "Crazy" (2024) | "Hot" (2025) | "Different" (2025) |

Jade singles chronology
| "FUFN (Fuck You for Now)" (2025) | "Hot" (English version remix) (2025) | "Plastic Box" (2025) |

Music video
- "Hot" on YouTube

"Hot" is a song recorded by South Korean girl group Le Sserafim for their fifth extended play of the same name. It was released as the EP's lead single by Source Music on March 14, 2025. The music video was released on the same day. A remix version of the track featuring English singer Jade, was released on April 14, 2025.

== Background ==
On February 16, 2025, Source Music announced that Le Sserafim would release Hot, their fifth extended play, on March 14. A trailer, titled "Born Fire," was released on February 21. Later, on March 12–13, two teasers for the "Hot" single were released. Hot was released alongside the music video for the lead single on March 14.

== Composition and reception ==
Le Sserafim explained that the title track was "a heartfelt, autobiographical anthem about chasing passion without fear of the outcome." Kim Chaewon specifically said that "Hot" was about passion and lending your heart to something you love.

Gladys Yeo of NME likened the "Surprisingly melodic ... disco-tinged" title track to "the breezy, ephemeral quality" of "Perfect Night" and observed that it "carries little of the fiery bombast of past singles like 'Antifragile' and 'Unforgiven.'"

Kristine Kang of GMA described the song as "an addictive mix of powerful drum beats and deep bass, perfectly complemented by the group's mesmerizing vocals and seamless harmonies." Pyo Kyung-min of The Korea Times noted its "subtle rock and disco elements" but also called it "the group's most serene and emotional melody yet."

Rhian Daly of NME also observed themes of romance in the title track's lyrics—a rarity for Le Sserafim's catalog.

== Accolades ==
On South Korean Music Programs, "Hot" won four first place trophy from Music Bank, Inkigayo, and Show! Music Core.

Music program awards for "Hot"
| Program | Date | Ref. |
|---|---|---|
| Music Bank | March 21, 2025 | |
| Inkigayo | April 6, 2025 | |
| Inkigayo | April 20, 2025 | |
| Show! Music Core | May 10, 2025 | |

== Track listing ==
- Digital download and streaming – English version
1. "Hot" – 2:23
2. "Hot" (English version) – 2:23
3. "Hot" (Sped up version) – 1:57
4. "Hot" (Slowed + reverb version) – 3:29
5. "Hot" (Instrumental) – 2:23
- Digital download and streaming – Le Sserafim package
1. "Hot" – 2:23
2. "Hot" (Kim Chaewon version) – 2:42
3. "Hot" (Sakura version) – 2:16
4. "Hot" (Huh Yunjin version) – 3:05
5. "Hot" (Kazuha version) – 2:09
6. "Hot" (Hong Eunchae version) – 2:31
- Digital download and streaming – English version; Jade remix
1. "Hot" – 2:23
2. "Hot" (English version; featuring Jade) – 2:23

== Personnel ==
- Le Sserafim – vocals
- Score (13) – production, keyboards, drums, vocal arrangement
- Megatone (13) – production, bass, guitar, vocal arrangement
- Jackson Shanks – production, synthesizer, guitar, drums
- Kim Junhyuk – digital editing
- Feli Ferraro – background vocals
- Lee Donggeun – recording engineering
- Hwang Minhee – recording engineering
- Jongpil Gu – mixing engineer
- Chris Gehringer – mastering engineer

== Charts ==
=== Weekly charts ===
Weekly chart performance for "Hot"
| Chart (2025) | Peak position |
|---|---|
| Canada Hot 100 (Billboard) | 91 |
| Global 200 (Billboard) | 45 |
| Hong Kong (Billboard) | 3 |
| Japan (Japan Hot 100) | 19 |
| Japan Combined Singles (Oricon) | 40 |
| Malaysia (IFPI) | 12 |
| Malaysia International (RIM) | 7 |
| New Zealand Hot Singles (RMNZ) | 11 |
| Philippines (Philippines Hot 100) | 58 |
| Singapore (RIAS) | 7 |
| South Korea (Circle) | 9 |
| Taiwan (Billboard) | 4 |
| UK Indie (Official Charts) | 37 |
| UK Singles Downloads (Official Charts) | 14 |
| UK Singles Sales (OCC) | 14 |
| US Bubbling Under Hot 100 (Billboard) | 9 |
| US World Digital Song Sales (Billboard) | 1 |

=== Monthly charts ===
Monthly chart performance for "Hot"
| Chart (2025) | Peak position |
|---|---|
| South Korea (Circle) | 10 |

=== Year-end charts ===
Year-end chart performance for "Hot"
| Chart (2025) | Position |
|---|---|
| South Korea (Circle) | 46 |

== Release history ==
Release history for "Hot"
| Region | Date | Format | Version | Label |
|---|---|---|---|---|
| United States | March 14, 2025 | CD | Original | Source; Geffen |
| Various | March 14, 2025 | Digital download; streaming | Original | Source; Geffen |
| Various | March 17, 2025 | Digital download; streaming | English | Source; Geffen |
| Various | March 18, 2025 | Digital download; streaming | Le Sserafim Package | Source; Geffen |
| Various | April 13, 2025 | Digital download; streaming | Jade remix | Source; Geffen |
| Various | June 24, 2025 | Digital download; streaming | Japanese (Note: Included in Le Sserafim's fourth Japanese single "Different") | Source; Universal Japan |
