= Crazy (Le Sserafim song) =

- Japanese single cover

Single by Le Sserafim

from the EP Crazy
- Language: Korean; English; Japanese
- Released: August 30, 2024
- Genre: EDM; house
- Length: 2:44
- Label: Source; Geffen
- Songwriters: Score (13); Megatone (13); Iluvjulia; "Hitman" Bang; Leven Kali; JBach; Jake Torrey; Supreme Boi; Anthony Watts; Amanda "Kiddo A.I." Ibanez; Huh Yunjin; Sakura
- Producers: 13; Iluvjulia; "Hitman" Bang

Le Sserafim singles chronology
"Smart" (2024)	"Crazy" (2024)	"Hot" (2025)

PinkPantheress singles chronology
"Turn It Up" (2024)	"Crazy" (remix) (2024)	"True Religion" (2025)

Music video
- "Crazy" on YouTube "Crazy" (English ver.) on YouTube

Le Sserafim Japanese singles chronology
"Unforgiven" (Japanese version) (2023)	"Crazy" (Japanese version) (2024)	"Different" (2025)

Music video
- "Crazy (Japanese ver.)" on YouTube

"Crazy" is a song recorded by South Korean girl group Le Sserafim from their fourth extended play of the same name. It was released as the EP's lead single by Source Music on August 30, 2024. Several remixes of the song were released, including an English version, and remixes with American ballroom performer Dashaun Wesley, British singer PinkPantheress, and French producer David Guetta.

== Background and release ==
On August 5, 2024, Source Music announced that Le Sserafim would be releasing their fourth extended play titled Crazy on August 30. On August 14, five track sampler videos were released. On August 22, the track listing was released with "Crazy" announced as the lead single. The following day, the highlight medley teaser video was released and the track listing was re-uploaded, with Le Sserafim members Huh Yunjin and Sakura now credited as songwriters on "Crazy". The music videos teasers were released on August 28 and 29.

Prior to the song's release, Le Sserafim posted a dance challenge video to their social media on August 23, showcasing the voguing choreography for the title track. The song was released alongside its music video and the extended play on August 30. Following release, there were several remixes of the song that were released in the proceeding weeks; these include an English version and a remix with American ballroom performer Dashaun Wesley on September 2, a remix featuring British singer PinkPantheress on September 4, and a remix from French DJ and producer David Guetta on September 9.

=== Japanese release ===
On October 18, the Japanese version of "Crazy" was announced as Le Sserafim's third Japanese single, which will also include the Japanese version of "Easy" from their third extended play of the same name. The promotion schedule was released a day later. On November 12, the track "Star Signs" from the single was pre-released, serving also as a campaign song for the Japanese fashion retail brand Lumine. "Star Signs" was described as having "city pop elements". "Crazy" (Japanese version) was released on December 11, 2024. On December 18, a week following the release of the single, two remixes of "Crazy" (Japanese version) by JP The Wavy and Chaki Zulu were released.

== Composition ==
"Crazy" was written and produced by Score (13), Megatone (13), Iluvjulia, and "Hitman" Bang, with Leven Kali, JBach, Jake Torrey, Supreme Boi, Anthony Watts, Amanda "Kiddo A.I." Ibanez, Huh Yunjin, and Sakura participating in the writing. Described as an EDM-based house song, "Crazy" has lyrics about the emotions someone feels when "they meet someone that drives them crazy". In an interview with NME, the group explained that the song explores "the struggles of loving something so much that you would do anything for it". Sports Trends writer Son Bong-seok described it as having lyrics that hit "like a million volts of electricity" and a chorus that lingers in one's ears.

== Music video ==
The music video, directed by Yunah Sheep, was released alongside the song by Source Music on August 30. The video shows the members wearing Y2K-inspired outfits and dancing in various locations, performing voguing choreography alongside the House of Juicy Couture vogue dance team to "maximize the charm of the performance". The members move through various locations, including "a bathhouse, an aquarium, and the deep ocean", and slip on a soap bar and "land perfectly with a voguing move".

== Accolades ==
On South Korean music programs, "Crazy" won four first place awards.

Music program awards for "Crazy"
Program	Date	Ref.
M Countdown	September 12, 2024	
M Countdown	September 19, 2024	
M Countdown	September 26, 2024	
Show Champion	September 11, 2024	

== Track listing ==
- Digital download and streaming – Party Remixes 1
1. "Crazy" – 2:44
2. "Crazy" (English version) – 2:44
3. "Crazy" (Vogue remix; featuring Dashaun Wesley) – 2:28
4. "Crazy" (Bounce up remix) – 2:36
5. "Crazy" (Dance remix) – 2:47
6. "Crazy" (Sped up version) – 2:02
7. "Crazy" (Slowed + reverb version) – 3:25
8. "Crazy" (Instrumental) – 2:44
- Digital download and streaming – PinkPantheress remix
1. "Crazy" – 2:44
2. "Crazy" (featuring PinkPantheress) – 2:48
- Digital download and streaming – David Guetta remix
1. "Crazy" (David Guetta remix) – 2:54
2. "Crazy" – 2:44
3. "Crazy" (David Guetta remix; extended version) – 4:00
- Digital download and streaming – Party Remixes 2
1. "Crazy" – 2:44
2. "Crazy" (EBM remix) – 4:00
3. "Crazy" (Super Crazy remix) – 2:40
4. "Crazy" (Vamos remix) – 2:40
5. "Crazy" (Mash-up version; featuring PinkPantheress and Dashaun Wesley) – 2:43
- CD, digital download and streaming – Japanese version
1. "Crazy" (Japanese version) – 2:44
2. "Easy" (Japanese version) – 2:44
3. "Star Signs" – 2:40
- Digital download and streaming – Japanese version / Party Remixes
1. "Crazy" (Japanese version) – 2:44
2. "Crazy" (Japanese version; featuring JP the Wavy) – 2:44
3. "Crazy" (Japanese version; Chaki Zulu remix) – 2:36

== Personnel ==
- Le Sserafim – lead vocals
- Score (13) – production, drums, keyboards, vocal arrangement, digital editing
- Megatone (13) – production, bass, guitar, vocal arrangement, digital editing
- Iluvjulia – production, drums, synthesizer
- "Hitman" Bang – production
- Jake Torrey – background vocals
- Geoff Swan – mix engineering
- Chris Gehringer – mastering
- Hwang Min-hee – engineering
- Kim Min-jun – engineering
- Teok Hyeon-gwan – engineering
- Matt Cahill – mix engineering assistance

== Charts ==
=== Weekly charts ===
Weekly chart performance for "Crazy"
Chart (2024)	Peak position
Canada Hot 100 (Billboard)	65
Global 200 (Billboard)	17
Hong Kong (Billboard)	4
Japan (Japan Hot 100)	3
Japan Combined Singles (Oricon)	17
Malaysia (Billboard)	6
Malaysia International (RIM)	7
New Zealand Hot Singles (RMNZ)	1
Philippines (Philippines Hot 100)	47
Singapore (RIAS)	6
South Korea (Circle)	22
Taiwan (Billboard)	3
UK Singles (Official Charts)	83
US Billboard Hot 100	76
US World Digital Song Sales (Billboard)	1

Weekly chart performance for "Crazy" Japanese version
Chart (2024)	Peak position
Japan (Oricon)	2
Japan Combined Singles (Oricon)	2

=== Monthly charts ===
Monthly chart performance for "Crazy"
Chart (2024)	Position
South Korea (Circle)	24

Monthly chart performance for "Crazy" Japanese version
Chart (2024)	Position
Japan (Oricon)	3

=== Year-end charts ===
Year-end chart performance for "Crazy" Japanese version
Chart (2025)	Position
Japan Top Singles Sales (Billboard Japan)	57
Japan (Oricon)	53

== Certifications ==
Certifications for "Crazy"
Region	Certification	Certified units/sales
Japan (RIAJ) Physical	Gold	100,000^{^}
New Zealand (RMNZ) PinkPantheress remix	Gold	15,000^{‡}
United Kingdom (BPI)	Silver	200,000^{‡}
Streaming
Japan (RIAJ)	Platinum	100,000,000^{†}
^{^} Shipments figures based on certification alone.^{‡} Sales+streaming figures based on certification alone.^{†} Streaming-only figures based on certification alone.

== Release history ==
Release history for "Crazy"
Region	Date	Format	Version	Label
United States	August 30, 2024	CD	Original	Source; Geffen
Various	August 30, 2024	Digital download; streaming	Original	Source; Geffen
Various	September 2, 2024	Digital download; streaming	Party remixes 1	Source; Geffen
Various	September 4, 2024	Digital download; streaming	PinkPantheress remix	Source; Geffen
Various	September 9, 2024	Digital download; streaming	David Guetta remix	Source; Geffen
Various	September 13, 2024	Digital download; streaming	Party remixes 2	Source; Geffen
Japan	December 11, 2024	CD	Japanese	EMI; Universal Japan; Source
Various	December 11, 2024	Digital download; streaming	Japanese	EMI; Universal Japan; Source
Various	December 17, 2024	Digital download; streaming	Japanese / Party remixes	EMI; Universal Japan; Source
