= Easy (EP) =

- Digital cover

EP by Le Sserafim
- Released: February 19, 2024
- Studio: Hybe Studio (Seoul)
- Length: 13:34
- Language: Korean
- Labels: Source; YG Plus; Geffen
- Producers: 13; Sean Turk; Cashae; Slow Rabbit; Noh Ju-hwan

Le Sserafim chronology
| Unforgiven (2023) | Easy (2024) | Crazy (2024) |

Singles from Easy
- 1. "Easy" Released: February 19, 2024; 2. "Smart" Released: March 5, 2024

Easy is the third extended play by South Korean girl group Le Sserafim. It was released by Source Music on February 19, 2024, and contains five tracks including the lead single of the same name.

== Background and release ==
On January 22, 2024, Source Music announced that Le Sserafim would be releasing their third extended play titled Easy on February 19. The comeback trailer was released on January 26 and 27. On February 7, five track sampler videos were released. A day later, the track listing was released with "Easy" announced as the lead single. On February 13, the highlight medley teaser video was released. The music video teasers for "Easy" were released on February 16 and 18. The extended play was released alongside the music video for "Easy" on February 19.

== Promotion ==
Prior to the release of Easy, on February 19, 2024, Le Sserafim held two live events on YouTube and Weverse to introduce the extended play and connect with their fans. The group embarked on the Easy Crazy Hot Tour in 2025 to promote the EP along with its following EPs, Crazy (2024) and Hot (2025).

== Composition ==
The album draws from the group members' uneasiness and worries behind their confidence. The intro track, "Good Bones", was described as an "unruly" rock and roll song, and features narrations in Korean, Japanese and English. The lead single, "Easy", is a trap and R&B song, expressing how the group "makes hard things look easy". "Smart" has been described as an Afropop-inspired Amapiano song. "We got so much", which was first performed on the Flame Rises Tour, features "crisp synths" and emotional lyrics dedicated to the group's fans.

== Critical reception ==
Professional ratings
Review scores
| Source | Rating |
|---|---|
| AllMusic | 3.5/5 stars |
| NME | 4/5 stars |

Easy was met with mixed-to-positive reviews from music critics. NME's Rhian Daly gave the album four stars out of five, writing that it "presents a new evolution in Le Sserafim's oeuvre, not just thematically but musically too". Lee Seung-won from IZM gave the album 2.5 stars out of five, writing that "although Easy has a lot of charm in its sound, it has more flaws than any of the group's other works." David Crone of AllMusic gave the album 3.5 stars out of five, praising "Good Bones" and "Easy" but overall assessing that the album's "sub-three-minute song lengths and heavy-handed influences put a ceiling on its potential for intrigue."

== Commercial performance ==
According to the Hanteo Chart, the album sold 783,358 copies on its first day of release. In Japan, the album sold 107,000 copies within its first week of release, marking Le Sserafim's highest first-week sales in the country.

== Track listing ==
Track listing for Easy
| No. | Title | Writer(s) | Producer(s) | Length |
|---|---|---|---|---|
| 1. | "Good Bones" | Score (13); Megatone (13); "Hitman" Bang; Hybe | 13 | 2:40 |
| 2. | "Easy" | Amanda "Kiddo A.I." Ibanez; Sean Turk; Joseph Barrios; Alex Fernandez; Jordyn Smith; Hadar Adora; Supreme Boi; Score (13); Megatone (13); "Hitman" Bang | Sean Turk; Cashae; 13 | 2:45 |
| 3. | "Swan Song" | Slow Rabbit; Justin Tranter; Sarah Troy; Supreme Boi; Score (13); Megatone (13); "Hitman" Bang; Kim Chaewon; Sakura; Kazuha; Huh Yunjin | Slow Rabbit; 13 | 2:37 |
| 4. | "Smart" | Score (13); Megatone (13); Supreme Boi; Arineh Karimi; BB Elliot; Zzz.; "Hitman" Bang; Paige Garabito; Huh Yunjin; Jasmin Lee Maming; Teodor Herrgårdh; Hadar Adora; Charli; Lee Eun-hwa (153/Joombas) | 13 | 2:46 |
| 5. | "We Got So Much" | Noh Ju-hwan; Sofia Vivere; Danke; Huh Yunjin; "Hitman" Bang; Hong Eunchae; Score (13); Megatone (13) | Noh Ju-hwan | 2:46 |
| Total length: | | | | 13:34 |

== Personnel ==
Musicians

- Le Sserafim – lead vocals
- Score (13) – production, drums, digital editing, vocal arrangement (1–4); keyboards (1, 3, 4)
- Megatone (13) – production, digital editing, vocal arrangement (1–4); bass, guitar (1, 4); keyboards (3)
- Sean Turk – production, main sample, drums, synthesizer (2)
- Joseph Barrios – production, drums, synthesizer (2)
- Alex Fernandez – production, drums, synthesizer (2)
- Slow Rabbit – production, synthesizer, bass, drums (3)
- Noh Ju-hwan – production, guitar, bass, drums, vocal arrangement, digital editing (5)
- Young – guitar (3)
- Kim Jun-hyeok – digital editing, vocal arrangement (3)
- Supreme Boi – vocal arrangement (2)
- Amanda "Kiddo A.I." Ibanez – background vocals (2)
- Sarah Troy – background vocals (3)
- Arineh Karimi – background vocals (4)
- Jasmin Lee Maming – background vocals (4)
- Sofia Vivere – background vocals (5)

Technical

- So Sung-jin – executive producer
- Geoff Swan – mix engineering (1)
- Manny Marroquin – mix engineering (2)
- Chris Galland – mix engineering (2)
- Tony Maserati – mix engineering (3, 5)
- David Younghyun – mix engineering (3, 5)
- Jordan "DJ Swivel" Young – mix engineering (4)
- Chris Gehringer – mastering
- Hwang Min-hee – engineering
- Lee Yeon-soo – engineering (2–4)
- Lee Pyeonguk – engineering (5)
- Matt Cahill – mix engineering assistance (1)
- Ramiro Fernandez-Seoane – mix engineering assistance (2)

== Charts ==
=== Weekly charts ===
Weekly chart performance for Easy
| Chart (2024) | Peak position |
|---|---|
| Belgian Albums (Ultratop Flanders) | 56 |
| Belgian Albums (Ultratop Wallonia) | 68 |
| Canadian Albums (Billboard) | 73 |
| Croatian International Albums (HDU) | 5 |
| German Albums (Offizielle Top 100) | 75 |
| Hungarian Albums (MAHASZ) | 27 |
| Japanese Albums (Oricon) | 1 |
| Japanese Combined Albums (Oricon) | 1 |
| Japanese Hot Albums (Billboard Japan) | 2 |
| Nigerian Albums (TurnTable) | 72 |
| New Zealand Albums (RMNZ) | 30 |
| South Korean Albums (Circle) | 1 |
| Swedish Physical Albums (Sverigetopplistan) | 15 |
| US Billboard 200 | 8 |
| US World Albums (Billboard) | 2 |

=== Monthly charts ===
Monthly chart performance for Easy
| Chart (2024) | Peak position |
|---|---|
| Japanese Albums (Oricon) | 2 |
| South Korean Albums (Circle) | 2 |

=== Year-end charts ===
Year-end chart performance for Easy
| Chart (2024) | Position |
|---|---|
| Japanese Albums (Oricon) | 30 |
| Japanese Hot Albums (Billboard Japan) | 36 |
| South Korean Albums (Circle) | 20 |

== Sales and certifications ==
Sales and certifications for Easy
| Region | Certification | Certified units/sales |
|---|---|---|
| Japan (RIAJ) | Gold | 100,000^{^} |
| South Korea (KMCA) | Million | 1,000,000^{^} |
^{^} Shipments figures based on certification alone.

== Release history ==
Release history for Easy
| Region | Date | Format | Label | Ref. |
|---|---|---|---|---|
| Various | February 19, 2024 | Digital download; streaming | Source; Geffen | |
| South Korea | February 19, 2024 | CD | Source; YG Plus | |
| South Korea | September 14, 2025 | Vinyl LP | Source; YG Plus | |
| South Korea | July 10, 2026 | NFC | Source; YG Plus | |
