= Unforgiven (Le Sserafim song) =

- Japanese regular cover

Single by Le Sserafim featuring Nile Rodgers

from the album Unforgiven
- Language: Korean; Japanese
- Released: May 1, 2023
- Genre: Hip hop
- Length: 3:02
- Label: Source; EMI; Universal Japan
- Songwriters: Score (13); Megatone (13); Supreme Boi; Oneye; Josefin Glenmark; Anders Gukko; Anne Judith Wik; Nermin Harambašić; Benjmn; Feli Ferraro; Kris Jana; Kyler Niko; Young Chance; Belle; Glenda Proby; Makaila J Garcia; Believve
- Producer: 13

Le Sserafim singles chronology
"Antifragile" (2022)	"Unforgiven" (2023)	"Eve, Psyche & the Bluebeard's Wife" (2023)

Nile Rodgers singles chronology
"Aqua" (2022)	"Unforgiven" (2023)

Music video
- "Unforgiven" on YouTube

Le Sserafim Japanese singles chronology
"Fearless" (Japanese version) (2023)	"Unforgiven" (Japanese version) (2023)	"Crazy" (Japanese version) (2024)

Ado singles chronology
"Himawari" (2023)	"Unforgiven" (Japanese version) (2023)	"Show" (2023)

Music video
- "Unforgiven (Japanese ver.)" on YouTube

"Unforgiven" is a song recorded by South Korean girl group Le Sserafim featuring American musician Nile Rodgers. It was released as the lead single for their first studio album of the same name by Source Music on May 1, 2023. The Japanese version of the song featuring Rodgers and Japanese singer Ado was released on August 23, 2023, as the group's second Japanese single by EMI Records and Universal Music Japan.

The song was commercially successful and peaked at number two on South Korea's Circle Digital Chart, as well as the top ten in Japan, Malaysia, Singapore, and Taiwan. The Japanese version additionally peaked at number two on the Oricon Singles Chart and number six on the Billboard Japan Hot 100. It has been certified platinum for physical sales and gold for streaming in Japan.

== Background and release ==
On March 16, 2023, Source Music reported that Le Sserafim would be releasing an album in early May. On April 3, it was confirmed that the group's first studio album would be titled Unforgiven and released on May 1. On April 18, the track listing was released with "Unforgiven" announced as the lead single. On April 24, the highlight medley teaser video was released. The music video teasers was released on April 28 and 30. The song was released alongside the album and its music video on May 1. The release of the Japanese version of the song was announced on June 20 as Le Sserafim's second Japanese single. The song was pre-released digitally on August 8 featuring Japanese singer Ado.

== Composition ==
"Unforgiven" was written and produced by Score (13) and Megatone (13) alongside Supreme Boi, Oneye, Josefin Glenmark, Anders Gukko, Anne Judith Wik, Nermin Harambašić, Benjmn, Feli Ferraro, Kris Jana, Kyler Niko, Young Chance, Belle, Glenda Proby, Makaila J Garcia, and Belle. It was described as hip hop song characterized by "funk guitar rhythms" played by American musician Nile Rodgers, it samples Ennio Morricone's "The Good, the Bad and the Ugly" used in the film of the same name with lyrics about "breaking away from the rules set by the world and going your own way". "Unforgiven" was composed in the key of E minor, with a tempo of 104 beats per minute.

== Music video ==
The music video directed by Yang Soon-sik was released alongside the song by Source Music on May 1. The western-inspired music video filmed in Bangkok, Thailand, portrays "the members [donning] cowboy hats" with scenes that switches between "western-themed bar to a helipad" while also featuring member Kim Chae-won "riding a white horse through a devastated city jumping over wreckage".

== Promotion ==
Prior to the release of Unforgiven, on May 1, 2023, Le Sserafim held a live event on YouTube to introduce the album and its song, including "Unforgiven", and to communicate with their fans. They subsequently performed on three music programs: Mnet's M Countdown on May 4, KBS's Music Bank on May 5, and SBS's Inkigayo on May 6.

== Reception ==
Grammy included "Unforgiven" in their list of the "15 K-Pop Songs That Took 2023 By Storm." The song was highlighted for its production and lyrical themes.

Award and nominations for "Unforgiven"
Year	Organization	Award	Result	Ref.
2023	Asian Pop Music Awards	Record of the Year (Overseas)	Nominated	
2023	The Fact Music Awards	Best Music – Summer	Nominated	
2023	MAMA Awards	Best Dance Performance Female Group	Nominated	
2023	MAMA Awards	Song of the Year	Nominated	
2024	Circle Chart Music Awards	Artist of the Year – Digital	Won	
2024	Circle Chart Music Awards	Artist of the Year – Streaming Unique Listeners	Won	
2024	Circle Chart Music Awards	Artist of the Year – Global Streaming	Nominated	
2024	Golden Disc Awards	Best Digital Song (Bonsang)	Won	
2024	Golden Disc Awards	Song of the Year (Daesang)	Nominated	

Music program awards
Program	Date	Ref.
Inkigayo	May 14, 2023	
M Countdown	May 11, 2023	
Music Bank	May 12, 2023	
Show! Music Core	May 13, 2023	
Show Champion	May 10, 2023	
The Show	May 9, 2023	

== Track listing ==
- CD single / digital download / streaming (Japanese version)
1. "Unforgiven" (featuring Nile Rodgers and Ado) (Japanese version) – 3:03
2. "Antifragile" (Japanese version) – 3:04
3. "Jewelry" (produced by Imase) – 2:43
- DVD (Japanese version – limited B)
1. "Unforgiven" (Japanese version) (music video)
2. "Unforgiven" (Japanese version) (MV & jacket shoot sketch)

== Credits and personnel ==
Adapted from the album liner notes.

- Le Sserafim - vocals
- Score (13) – production, keyboards, drums, digital editing, vocal arrangement
- Megatone (13) – production, bass, drums, digital editing, vocal arrangement
- Kim Jun-yeong – digital editing
- Nile Rodgers – guitar
- Hareem – harmonica, ocarina, Irish whistle, background vocals
- Anne Judith Wik – background vocals
- Josefin Glenmark – background vocals
- Kris Jana – background vocals
- Manny Marroquin – mix engineering
- Chris Galland – mix engineering
- Hwang Min-hee – engineering
- Ramiro Fernandez-Seoane – mix engineering assistance
- Chris Gehringer – mastering

Notes

- "Unforgiven" contains portions of "The Good, the Bad and the Ugly", the theme to the film of the same name, written by Ennio Morricone.

== Charts ==
=== Weekly charts ===
Weekly chart performance for "Unforgiven"
Chart (2023)	Peak position
Canada Hot 100 (Billboard)	92
Global 200 (Billboard)	23
Hong Kong (Billboard)	11
Japan Hot 100 (Billboard)	10
Japan Combined Singles (Oricon)	14
Malaysia (Billboard)	11
Malaysia International (RIM)	6
New Zealand Hot Singles (RMNZ)	7
Singapore (RIAS)	3
South Korea (Circle)	2
Taiwan (Billboard)	6
UK Indie Breakers (OCC)	16
US World Digital Song Sales (Billboard)	7
Vietnam (Vietnam Hot 100)	44

Weekly chart performance for "Unforgiven" Japanese ver.
Chart (2023)	Peak position
Japan (Japan Hot 100)	6
Japan (Oricon)	2
Japan Combined Singles (Oricon)	2

=== Monthly charts ===
Monthly chart performance for "Unforgiven"
Chart (2023)	Position
South Korea (Circle)	2

=== Year-end charts ===
2023 year-end chart performance for "Unforgiven"
Chart (2023)	Position
Global Excl. US (Billboard)	137
Japan (Japan Hot 100)	95
Japan (Oricon)	45
South Korea (Circle)	11

2024 year-end chart performance for "Unforgiven"
Chart (2024)	Position
South Korea (Circle)	129

== Certifications ==
Certifications for "Unforgiven"
Region	Certification	Certified units/sales
Japan (RIAJ)	Platinum	250,000^{^}
Streaming
Japan (RIAJ)	Platinum	100,000,000^{†}
^{^} Shipments figures based on certification alone.^{†} Streaming-only figures based on certification alone.

== Release history ==
Release history for "Unforgiven"
Region	Date	Format	Version	Label
Various	May 1, 2023	Digital download; streaming	Korean	Source
Japan	August 23, 2023	CD single	Japanese	EMI; Source Music; Universal Japan
