= Antifragile (song) =

Single by Le Sserafim

from the EP Antifragile
- Language: Korean; English
- Released: October 17, 2022
- Genre: Pop; reggaeton
- Length: 3:04
- Label: Source; YG Plus
- Songwriters: Score (13); Megatone (13); Paulina Cerrilla; "Hitman" Bang; Shintaro Yasuda; Supreme Boi; Isabella Lovestory; Kyler Niko; Ronnie Icon; Nathalie Boone; Danke (Lalala Studio)
- Producer: 13

Le Sserafim singles chronology
"Fearless" (2022)	"Antifragile" (2022)	"Unforgiven" (2023)

Music video
- "Antifragile" on YouTube

"Antifragile" is a song recorded by South Korean girl group Le Sserafim for their second extended play of the same name. It was released as the lead single of the EP by Source Music on October 17, 2022. An upbeat pop and reggaeton track infused with Afro-Latin production drives the message of overcoming hardships for growth and resilience. Written by several contributors, including "Hitman" Bang and Isabella Lovestory, the song emphasizes the group's determination to emerge stronger after facing hardships.

The song was commercially successful and peaked at number two on the Circle Digital Chart in South Korea. It has since been certified platinum for surpassing 100 million streams in Japan.

== Background ==
On September 19 at midnight KST, the group officially announced the date and details of their upcoming comeback, which would mark their first release as a five-member group after Kim Ga-ram's departure. "Antifragile" was first previewed on October 3, 2022, in a track sampler released by Source Music on social media platforms and was announced through the track list the next day. On October 17, 2022, the single was officially released alongside its music video, 18 hours prior to the EP. A Japanese version of the song was included in Le Sserafim's second Japanese single "Unforgiven", which was released on August 23, 2023.

== Composition and lyrics ==
The second and title track of the EP, "Antifragile" was written by Score (13), Megatone (13), Paulina Cerrilla, "Hitman" Bang, Shintaro Yasuda, Supreme Boi, Isabella Lovestory, Kyler Niko, Ronnie Icon, Nathalie Boone and Danke (Lalala Studio) and runs for three minutes and four seconds. It is an upbeat an "Afro-Latin style" reggaetón pop song with a "heavy" Latin rhythm. Lyrically, the song sees Le Sserafim declare that difficult times are stimulus for growth and that they will become stronger with such a mindset. It was composed in the key of B-flat minor, with a tempo of 105 beats per minute.

== Reception ==
Gladys Yeo of NME wrote, "The song tears away the cool confidence of 'Fearless' and bursts with life an infectious energy previously unseen from Le Sserafim. While the track's ever-present pipe effect borders on grating, the intense, rhythmic beats of 'Antifragile' make for such a thrilling experience that it barely even matters". Idology included "Antifragile" in their list of the 20 best idol pop songs of 2022. In July 2023, Rolling Stone ranked the song at #79 on their list of The 100 Greatest Songs in the History of Korean Pop Music.

== Music video ==
The music video for "Antifragile" was released on October 17, 2022, at midnight KST, 18 hours before the EP's release. In the music video, Le Sserafim go about their daily lives as others around them panic due to an impending asteroid collision. The video ends with the group finishing the song's choreography and getting hit by the asteroid, only to survive and brush off the dust.

== Accolades ==
Awards and nominations for "Antifragile"
Year	Ceremony	Award	Result	Ref.
2023	Circle Chart Music Awards	Artist of the Year – Global Digital Music (October)	Won	
2023	Korean Music Awards	Best K-pop Song	Nominated	

Music program awards for "Antifragile"
Program	Date	Ref.
Music Bank	November 4, 2022	
Music Bank	November 11, 2022	
Show! Music Core	December 3, 2022	
Show! Music Core	December 10, 2022	
Show! Music Core	December 17, 2022	

== Credits and personnel ==
- Score (13) – writing, production
- Megatone (13) – writing, production
- Paulina Cerrilla – writing
- "Hitman" Bang – writing
- Shintaro Yasuda – writing
- Supreme Boi – writing
- Isabella Lovestory – writing
- Kyler Niko – writing
- Ronnie Icon – writing
- Nathalie Boone – writing
- Danke (Lalala Studio) – writing

== Charts ==
=== Weekly charts ===
Weekly chart performance for "Antifragile"
Chart (2022)	Peak position
Canada Hot 100 (Billboard)	96
Global 200 (Billboard)	38
Hong Kong (Billboard)	14
Japan Hot 100 (Billboard)	12
Japan Combined Singles (Oricon)	13
Malaysia (Billboard)	19
New Zealand Hot Singles (RMNZ)	19
Philippines (Billboard)	15
Singapore (RIAS)	5
South Korea (Circle)	2
Taiwan (Billboard)	8
US World Digital Song Sales (Billboard)	8
Vietnam (Vietnam Hot 100)	35

=== Monthly charts ===
Monthly chart performance for "Antifragile"
Chart (2022)	Position
South Korea (Circle)	3

=== Year-end charts ===
2022 year-end chart performance for "Antifragile"
Chart (2022)	Position
South Korea (Circle)	89

2023 year-end chart performance for "Antifragile"
Chart (2023)	Position
Global 200 (Billboard)	182
Japan (Japan Hot 100)	46
South Korea (Circle)	14

2024 year-end chart performance for "Antifragile"
Chart (2024)	Position
South Korea (Circle)	182

== Certifications ==
Certifications for "Antifragile"
Region	Certification	Certified units/sales
New Zealand (RMNZ)	Gold	15,000^{‡}
Streaming
Japan (RIAJ)	2× Platinum	200,000,000^{†}
South Korea (KMCA)	Platinum	100,000,000^{†}
^{†} Streaming-only figures based on certification alone.

== Release history ==
Release history for "Antifragile"
Region	Date	Format	Label
Various	October 17, 2022	Digital download; streaming	Source Music; YG Plus

== See also ==
- List of Music Bank Chart winners (2022)
- List of Show! Music Core Chart winners (2022)
