= Fearless (Le Sserafim EP) =

- Digital cover

EP by Le Sserafim
- Released: May 2, 2022
- Recorded: 2022
- Studios: Hybe Studio (Yongsan, Seoul)
- Genres: Alternative pop; disco-funk; R&B
- Length: 14:12
- Language: Korean
- Labels: Source; YG Plus
- Producers: "Hitman" Bang; 13

Le Sserafim chronology
Fearless (2022)	Antifragile (2022)

Singles from Fearless
- 1. "Fearless" Released: May 2, 2022

Professional ratings
Review scores
Source	Rating
IZM	2/5 stars
NME	3/5 stars

Fearless is the debut extended play by South Korean girl group Le Sserafim. It was released by Source Music on May 2, 2022, and contains five tracks, including the lead single of the same name. Fearless is the group's only release to include Kim Ga-ram, who was removed from the lineup on July 20, 2022.

The album debuted at number two on the Gaon Album Chart and was certified double platinum by the Korea Music Content Association (KMCA) for selling 500,000 units.

== Background and release ==
On March 14, 2022, Source Music announced it would be debuting a new girl group in collaboration with Hybe Corporation. One week later, Hybe Corporation announced the group would be debuting in May. On April 13, it was announced the group would release their debut extended play Fearless on May 2. On April 25, the track list was released, with "Fearless" announced as the lead single. Two days later, the highlight medley video was released. Music video teasers for the lead single were released on April 29 and May 1, respectively.

== Composition ==
Fearless consists of five tracks and incorporates various genres of alternative pop, disco-funk, and R&B. The opening track, "The World is My Oyster", is characterized by "a strong rhythm and a psychedelic mood that [is] reminiscent of the runway of a fashion show". The lead single "Fearless" is a funk and alternative pop song with lyrics about "moving forward without being shaken by the past". The third track "Blue Flame" is a disco-punk song with "a sophisticated melody and mysterious atmosphere". The fourth track "The Great Mermaid" was described as a retelling of The Little Mermaid fairytale "from the perspective of Le Sserafim". The final track "Sour Grapes" was "inspired by Aesop's The Fox and the Grapes" fable and features lyrics detailing "[the] psychology of pure curiosity about love and the selfish side of valuing oneself more".

== Commercial performance ==
On April 30, it was announced that pre-orders of Fearless exceeded 380,000 copies.

On the day of its release alone, the extended play (EP) sold more than 175,000 copies, breaking the record for a girl group debut set previously in January by Kep1er's First Impact, which achieved 150,000 first-day album sales.

Fearless debuted at number two on South Korea's Gaon Album Chart in the issue dated May 1–7, 2022; on the monthly chart, it debuted at number five in the issue for May 2022 with 412,696 copies sold. On Billboard Japan Hot Albums, the EP debuted at number one in the chart issue dated May 11, 2022. It also debuted at number three on the Oricon Albums Chart in the chart issue dated May 16, 2022; on the monthly chart, it debuted at number nine in the issue for May 2022 with 32,998 copies sold. The EP debuted at number 37 on the Hungarian MAHASZ Top 40 Album Chart in the issue dated May 20–26, 2022.

== Promotion ==
Following the release of Fearless, Le Sserafim held a live showcase on the same date to introduce the extended play and communicate with their fans. The group performed "Fearless" and "Blue Flame" during the showcase.

== Track listing ==
All tracks are produced by Source Music's in-house production team 13 (Score (Note: Score (birth name Lee Kwan) is a member of production team 13.) and Megatone (Note: Megatone (birth name Kim Byung-Seok) is a member of production team 13.)).

Track listing for Fearless
No.	Title	Writer(s)	Length
1.	"The World Is My Oyster"	Score (13); Megatone (13); Hybe	1:47
2.	"Fearless"	Score (13); Megatone (13); Supreme Boi; Blvsh; Jaro; Nikolay Mohr; "Hitman" Bang; Oneye; Josefin Glenmark; Emmy Kasai; Kyler Niko; Paulina "Pau" Cerrilla; Destiny Rogers	2:48
3.	"Blue Flame"	Score (13); Megatone (13); Jonna Hall; Gayoung (PNP); Kim In-hyung; Danke (Lalala Studio); Ronnie Icon; Caroline Gustavsson; Kim Chaewon; Huh Yunjin	3:22
4.	"The Great Mermaid"	Score (13); Megatone (13); "Hitman" Bang; Sunshine (Cazzi Opeia and Ellen Berg); Anne Judith Stokke Wik (Dsign Music); Ronny Svendsen (Dsign Music); Nermin Harambašić (Dsign Music); Danke; TK; Kyler Niko; Paulina "Pau" Cerrilla; Lee Hyung-seok; Jeong Jin-woo	2:58
5.	"Sour Grapes"	Score (13); Megatone (13); Danke; Abir; Kayofkaj; Nermin Harambašić (Dsign Music); Lady V; Kim In-hyeong; Sunshine (Cazzi Opeia and Ellen Berg)	3:17
Total length:			14:12

== Charts ==
=== Weekly charts ===
Weekly chart performance for Fearless
Chart (2022–2023)	Peak position
Croatian International Albums (HDU)	17
Finnish Albums (Suomen virallinen lista)	27
Hungarian Albums (MAHASZ)	37
Japanese Albums (Oricon)	3
Japanese Combined Albums (Oricon)	1
Japanese Hot Albums (Billboard Japan)	1
South Korean Albums (Gaon)	2
Spanish Albums (Promusicae)	94

=== Monthly charts ===
Monthly chart performance for Fearless
Chart (2022)	Peak position
Japanese Albums (Oricon)	9
South Korean Albums (Gaon)	5

=== Year-end charts ===
Year-end chart performance for Fearless
Chart (2022)	Position
Japanese Albums (Oricon)	76
Japanese Hot Albums (Billboard Japan)	92
South Korean Albums (Circle)	39

== Sales and certifications ==
Sales and certifications for Fearless
Region	Certification	Certified units/sales
Japan	—	45,994
South Korea (KMCA)	2× Platinum	506,169

== Release history ==
Release history for Fearless
Region	Date	Format	Label
Various	May 2, 2022	Digital download; streaming	Source Music; YG Plus
South Korea	May 2, 2022	CD	Source Music; YG Plus
South Korea	July 10, 2026	NFC	Source Music; YG Plus

== See also ==
- Antifragile (EP)
- List of Billboard Japan Hot Albums number ones of 2022
