= Perfect Night (Le Sserafim song) =

Single by Le Sserafim
- Language: English
- Released: October 27, 2023
- Genre: 2-step garage
- Length: 2:39
- Label: Source
- Songwriters: Score (13); Megatone (13); Sofia Quinn; "Hitman" Bang; Amanda "Kiddo A.I." Ibanez; Marcus Andersson; Lauren Aquilina; Jorge Luis Perez Jr; Huh Yunjin; Niklas Jarelius Persson; Zikai; Ninos Hanna
- Producers: 13; "Hitman" Bang

Le Sserafim singles chronology
| "Eve, Psyche & the Bluebeard's Wife" (2023) | "Perfect Night" (2023) | "Easy" (2024) |

Music video
- "Perfect Night" on YouTube

"Perfect Night" is a song by South Korean girl group Le Sserafim. It was released by Source Music on October 27, 2023, as the group's first English single and also served as a promotional song for the video game Overwatch 2.

"Perfect Night" was a commercial success in South Korea, becoming Le Sserafim's first number one on the Circle Digital Chart and remained atop the chart for six non-consecutive weeks. It also reached number one in Hong Kong, Singapore and Taiwan, as well as the top 10 in Japan, Malaysia and New Zealand.

== Background and release ==
On October 11, 2023, Source Music released a teaser video for Le Sserafim's new music via Hybe's official YouTube channel. The next day, the group announced the release of their new single "Perfect Night" on October 27, along with the release of the promotion schedule. Concept videos for the single was released on October 18. On October 19, the single was revealed to be a promotional single for Overwatch 2. A teaser for the music video was released on October 24. The single was released alongside its music video on October 27.

== Composition ==
"Perfect Night" was written by Score (13), Megatone (13), Sofia Quinn, "Hitman" Bang, Amanda "Kiddo A.I." Ibanez, Marcus Andersson, Lauren Aquilina, Jorge Luis Perez Jr, Huh Yunjin, Niklas Jarelius Persson, Zikai, Ninos Hanna and produced by the production team 13 and "Hitman" Bang. It is a 2-step garage song which "sends an energetic message that even a not-so-perfect day can be fun when you spend it with your crew."

== Music video ==
The song's music video was released on October 27, 2023, on the HYBE Labels YouTube channel. It was directed by Woogie Kim and features images of the group members dancing to the song interspersed with animation produced by Blizzard, Overwatch 2's studio. As of September 10, 2024, the video has accumulated over 101 million views.

== Promotion and live performances ==
Le Sserafim performed the single on two music programs: Music Bank on October 28, and Inkigayo on October 29. They also performed on Fresh Out Live on October 28, and at the gaming convention BlizzCon 2023 on November 4. During the 2023 SBS Gayo Daejeon, held on December 25, 2023, Le Sserafim performed a medley of "Eve, Psyche & the Bluebeard's Wife" and "Perfect Night".

== Accolades ==
"Perfect Night" received two first place music program awards on the December 9 and 16, 2023, episodes of Show! Music Core.

== Track listing ==
- Digital download and streaming
1. "Perfect Night" – 2:39
- Digital download and streaming – remix
1. "Perfect Night" (sped up version) – 2:08
2. "Perfect Night" (slowed + reverb version) – 2:55

== Charts ==
=== Weekly charts ===
Weekly chart performance for "Perfect Night"
| Chart (2023–2024) | Peak position |
|---|---|
| Canada Hot 100 (Billboard) | 58 |
| Global 200 (Billboard) | 18 |
| Hong Kong (Billboard) | 1 |
| Japan Hot 100 (Billboard) | 7 |
| Japan Combined Singles (Oricon) | 10 |
| Malaysia (Billboard) | 6 |
| Malaysia International (RIM) | 4 |
| New Zealand Hot Singles (RMNZ) | 5 |
| Singapore (RIAS) | 1 |
| South Korea (Circle) | 1 |
| Taiwan (Billboard) | 1 |
| UK Indie Breakers (OCC) | 12 |
| UK Singles Downloads (Official Charts) | 44 |
| UK Singles Sales (OCC) | 52 |
| US Bubbling Under Hot 100 (Billboard) | 19 |
| Vietnam (Vietnam Hot 100) | 48 |

=== Monthly charts ===
Monthly chart performance for "Perfect Night"
| Chart (2023) | Position |
|---|---|
| South Korea (Circle) | 1 |

=== Year-end charts ===
2023 year-end chart performance for "Perfect Night"
| Chart (2023) | Position |
|---|---|
| South Korea (Circle) | 124 |

2024 year-end chart performance for "Perfect Night"
| Chart (2024) | Position |
|---|---|
| Global 200 (Billboard) | 135 |
| Japan (Japan Hot 100) | 36 |
| South Korea (Circle) | 21 |

2025 year-end chart performance for "Perfect Night"
| Chart (2025) | Position |
|---|---|
| South Korea (Circle) | 181 |

== Certifications ==
Certifications for "Perfect Night"
| Region | Certification | Certified units/sales |
|---|---|---|
| New Zealand (RMNZ) | Gold | 15,000^{‡} |
Streaming
| Japan (RIAJ) | 2× Platinum | 200,000,000^{†} |
| South Korea (KMCA) | Platinum | 100,000,000^{†} |
^{‡} Sales+streaming figures based on certification alone.^{†} Streaming-only figures based on certification alone.

== Release history ==
Release history for "Perfect Night"
| Region | Date | Format | Version | Label |
|---|---|---|---|---|
| Various | October 27, 2023 | Digital download; streaming | Original | Source |
| Various | October 30, 2023 | Digital download; streaming | Remix | Source |

== See also ==
- List of Circle Digital Chart number ones of 2023
- List of Circle Digital Chart number ones of 2024
- List of number-one songs of 2023 (Singapore)
