= YG Plus =

South Korean media and advertising company

YG Plus Inc.
- Native name: YG 플러스
- Formerly: Phoenix Holdings Inc.
- Type: Public
- Traded as: KRX: 037270
- Industry: Advertising; Media; Music
- Founded: November 15, 1996; 30 years ago
- Headquarters: 07326 10, Gukjegeumyung, Yeongdeungpo, Seoul, South Korea
- Key people: Choi Sung-jun (CEO); Yang Min-seok (chairman of the board of directors)
- Products: Advertising; Media; Music
- Revenue: ▲ ₩1.4 trillion (US$1.05 billion) (2022); ₩1.2 trillion (US$897.58 million) (2021)
- Operating income: ▲ ₩220 billion (US$164.15 million) (2022); ₩103 billion (US$76.85 million) (2021)
- Net income: ▼ ₩167 billion (US$124.6 million) (2022); ₩226 billion (US$168.62 million) (2021)
- Total assets: ▲ ₩2.41 trillion (US$1.8 billion) (2022); ₩2.23 trillion (US$1.66 billion) (2021)
- Owner: YG Entertainment (30.22%); Weverse Company (10.23%); Yang Min-suk (3.50%); Others (48.39%)
- Parent: YG Entertainment
- Subsidiaries: see list
- Website: ygplus.com

YG Plus Inc. (previously Phoenix Holdings Inc.) is a South Korean publicly traded media and advertising company acquired by YG Entertainment in November 2014. In 2019, the company entered the music distribution industry and also engages in production, distribution, and licensing of merchandise related to music artists.

== History ==
YG Entertainment acquired Phoenix Holdings, a public relations company from Bongwan Group, in November 2014 and rebranded it as YG Plus. Yang Min-suk, the younger brother of YG Entertainment founder Yang Hyun-suk, was appointed as the company's CEO, with YG Entertainment owning 38.6% of the company's shares. In 2019, the company entered the music distribution industry.

On January 27, 2021, it was revealed that Hybe Corporation, and its technology subsidiary, Weverse Company (formerly beNX) invested 70B KRW (~63M USD) in the company, acquiring 17.9% of the company in a merchandising and distribution deal that would see YG Entertainment's artists join Weverse in return. In March 2021, Choi Sung-jun was appointed as the new CEO while Yang Min-suk was appointed as the executive director for the company.

On September 23, 2025, Hybe sold its entire 7.67% stake in YG Plus for a total of ₩38.22 billion (US$28.52 million). HYBE's total ownership in the YG Entertainment thus reduced to 10.23% from 17.9% as it still maintains a position through subsidiary, Weverse Company.

On November 9, 2026, in a company filing, it announced plans to change its name from YG PLUS Co., Ltd. to PLVS Co., Ltd., subject to shareholder approval at an extraordinary general meeting scheduled for December 28, 2026.

== Notable distributed labels ==
=== Present ===
South Korean

- YG Entertainment
- The Black Label
- Hybe Corporation
  - Big Hit Music
  - Source Music
  - ADOR
  - Pledis Entertainment
- JTBC (select releases only)
- Paktory Company
- BPM Entertainment

=== Former ===
- HYPLE (moved to NHN Bugs)

== Subsidiaries ==
=== Moonshot ===
Moonshot (stylized in all lowercase) is a cosmetics brand launched by YG on October 2, 2016. Developed with China's Huanya Group and in partnership with the cosmetics manufacturing company COSON, the brand is named after Apollo 11's historical 1969 landing on the Moon. Its cosmetics are manufactured in South Korea and sold online as well as in-store in Samcheong, where according to Paik Ho-jin, an employee of the brand, Chinese shoppers account for 40-50% of the customers. As part of YG's partnership with French luxury conglomerate LVMH, Moonshot was launched at 11 Sephora stores in Singapore and at 13 Sephora stores in Malaysia on September 24, 2015.

=== Nona9on ===
Nona9on is a luxury street-wear brand founded in early 2012 by YG and Samsung’s textile subsidiary company Cheil Industries. It operates through secondary retailers and pop-up stores, such as its first pop-up at Apgujeong’s Galleria Department Store. Following its domestic success, the clothing line also quickly sold out in its first international pop-up stores in 10 Corso Como shops in Milan, as well as other locations in Shanghai and Hong Kong. The brand plans to open a pop-up store at JayCo in Taiwan. It often features Bobby & B.I from iKon and Lisa from Blackpink in their commercials and promotions.

=== YG Sports ===
YG Golf Academy was established in March 2015, by acquisition of G-AD Communication, a golf agency that handled notable professional South Korean golfers such as Kim Hyo-joo, with YG Plus' aims to expand into golf businesses. Leading golf coach Han Yeon-hee was recruited as the head instructor of the academy. In January 2017, it was renamed as YG Sports to expand into sports businesses.

=== YG Studioplex ===
YG Studioplex (stylized in all caps) is a TV drama production company jointly established by YG and Barami Bunda Inc. in April 2017. The studio will "specialise in the production of Korean Wave contents" and enter the global market. The studio was preceded by YG's attempts to get involved in the content production industry, following in the footsteps of SM Entertainment's SM C&C and CJ E&M (now CJ ENM)'s Studio Dragon. In 2016, YG participated in a joint production with NBCUniversal by investing in SBS's Moon Lovers: Scarlet Heart Ryeo. Since then, YG has also actively recruited program directors (PD) from various terrestrial broadcasters, including Producer Park Hong-kyun, who worked on MBC's Queen Seondeok and The Greatest Love.

==== Works ====
- I Picked Up a Celebrity on the Street (나는 길에서 연예인을 주웠다) (oksusu, 2018, co-produced with BaramiBunda inc)
- Love Alert (설렘주의보) (MBN, 2018, co-produced with Big Ocean E&M and Excel Investment)
- Mr. Queen (철인왕후) (tvN, 2020, co-produced with Studio Dragon and Crave Works)
- Joseon Exorcist (조선구마사) (SBS, 2021, co-produced with Crave Works and Lotte Cultureworks)
- Dr. Brain (Dr. 브레인) (Apple TV+, 2021, co-produced with Kakao Entertainment, Bound Entertainment and Dark Circle Pictures)

=== Uncore ===
Uncore is a South Korean record label and entertainment agency. It was founded on November 28, 2024 as an independent label under SLL and YG Plus.

== Other assets ==
=== Seoul Music ===
SEOUL MUSIC (서울뮤직) is YG Plus' brand for music promotion and distribution, which started in June 2019 after it took over the operation of social media accounts of the now-defunct sister label HIGHGRND.

== Former subsidiaries ==
=== KPlus ===
KPlus (formerly YG K+) is a partnership between YG and Chorokbaem Media as a Korean model management company. As of 2014, KPlus model agency housed over 170 models, including Kang Seung-hyun, Park Hyeong-seop, Lee Sung-kyung, Nam Joo-hyuk, Jang Ki-yong, Sandara Park, and Choi Sora. Since the partnership, KPlus models have appeared in YG recording artists' music videos, as well as YG-owned brands' advertisement campaigns. YG has also reportedly provided YG K+ models with roles in TV dramas, notably Nam Joo-hyuk in Who Are You: School 2015 and Lee Sung-kyung in It's Okay, That's Love, and have formally transitioned models to their acting division.

In May 2022, Chorokbaem Media acquired 50% of the company's shares. On August 22, 2022, it was announced that the company would change its name from YGKPLUS to KPLUS after the acquisition, while still collaborating with YG in the future.
