= Kiss Road =

2024–2025 concert tour by Kiss of Life

- Tour by Kiss of Life
- Location: Asia; North America; Europe
- Associated album: Lose Yourself
- Start date: October 26, 2024
- End date: May 4, 2025
- Legs: 4
- No. of shows: 45

Kiss Road is the debut global concert tour by South Korean girl group Kiss of Life, held in support of their 2024 extended play Lose Yourself. The tour spans 45 shows across four legs in Asia, North America, and Europe, beginning on October 26, 2024, in Seoul and concluding on May 4, 2025, in Osaka.

== Background ==
Kiss of Life's first world tour, "Kiss Road," was announced on August 26, 2024 by S2 Entertainment and the group. The tour included shows in South Korea, the United States, and Canada, taking place from October to December 2024.

The "Kiss Road" tour began on October 26 and 27 at the Olympic Hall, with the setlist featuring the unreleased song "Winehouse." A European leg of the tour was later added for February and March 2025, followed by an Asian leg in April 2025.

== Critical reception ==
Professional ratings
Review scores
Source	Rating
NME	4/5 stars

NME's Lucy Ford praised Kiss of Life's performance at London, Indigo at The O2 marked by a minimalist stage design, stood in stark contrast to the typical visual overstimulation typically associated with K-pop performances. The tour featured a stripped-back setup with only a black stage and a couple of side-stage screens for decoration. Ford noted this approach as allowing "their vocals and performance to shine".

== Set list ==
Setlist in Seoul

Act 1

1. "Get Loud"
2. "Igloo"
3. "Bad News"
4. "Winehouse"
5. "Chemistry"

Act 2
Solos

1. "Countdown" (Belle solo)
2. "Kitty Cat" (Julie solo)
3. "Play Love Games" (Haneul solo)
4. "Sugarcoat" (Natty solo)

Act 3

1. "Te Quiero"
2. "Nobody Knows"
3. "Gentleman"
4. "No One But Us"
5. "Too Many Alex"
6. "My 808"
7. "Sticky" (Snowy Version)
8. "TTG"
9. "R.E.M"
10. "Nothing"
11. "Midas Touch"
12. "Shhh"

Encore

1. "Bye My Neverland"
2. "Says It"
3. "Back To Me"
4. "Sticky"
Setlist in North America

Act 1

1. "Get Loud"
2. "Igloo"
3. "Bad News"(English Version)
4. "Winehouse"
5. "Chemistry"
6. "Too Many Alex"
7. "Te Quiero"
8. "Nobody Knows"
9. "Gentleman"
10. "Sticky"
11. "My 808"
12. "R.E.M"
13. "Nothing"
14. "Midas Touch"
15. "Shhh"

Encore

1. "Bye My Neverland"
2. "No One But Us"
3. "Back To Me"
Setlist in Europe
1. "Bad News"(English Version)
2. "Igloo"
3. "Get Loud"
4. "Winehouse"
5. "Chemistry"
6. "TTG"
7. "Nobody Knows"
8. "Te Quiero"
9. "Gentleman"
10. "Sticky"
11. "My 808"
12. "Nothing"
13. "Midas Touch"
14. "Shhh"

Encore

1. "Bye My Neverland"
2. "No One But Us"
3. "Back To Me"

== Tour dates ==
List of concert dates
Date	City	Country	Venue	Attendance	Ref
October 26, 2024	Seoul	South Korea	Olympic Hall	—	
October 27, 2024	Seoul	South Korea	Olympic Hall	—	
November 10, 2024	Minneapolis	United States	Uptown Theater	—	
November 12, 2024	Chicago	United States	Riviera Theatre	—	
November 15, 2024	Montreal	Canada	M Telus	—	
November 16, 2024	Boston	United States	Orpheum Theatre	—	
November 18, 2024	Silver Spring	United States	The Fillmore	—	
November 19, 2024	Silver Spring	United States	The Fillmore	—	
November 21, 2024	New York	United States	Irving Plaza	—	
November 22, 2024	New York	United States	Hammerstein Ballroom	—	
November 24, 2024	Atlanta	United States	The Eastern	—	
November 26, 2024	Houston	United States	713 Music Hall	—	
November 27, 2024	Dallas	United States	The Factory in Deep Ellum	—	
November 29, 2024	San Antonio	United States	The Tobin Center for the Performing Arts	—	
December 1, 2024	Phoenix	United States	The Van Buren	—	
December 3, 2024	Los Angeles	United States	The Novo	—	
December 4, 2024	Los Angeles	United States	The Novo	—	
December 7, 2024	Las Vegas	United States	House of Blues	—	
December 8, 2024	Anaheim	United States	House of Blues	—	
December 10, 2024	San Francisco	United States	The Warfield	—	
December 12, 2024	Seattle	United States	Moore Theatre	—	
December 13, 2024	Vancouver	Canada	Vogue Theatre	—	
February 20, 2025	Milan	Italy	Alcatraz	—	
February 21, 2025	Zurich	Switzerland	Komplex 457	—	
February 24, 2025	Utrecht	Netherlands	TivoliVredenburg	—	
February 26, 2025	Berlin	Germany	Columbiahalle	—	
February 27, 2025	Vienna	Austria	Gasometer	—	
March 1, 2025	Esch-sur-Alzette	Luxembourg	Rockhal	—	
March 3, 2025	Munich	Germany	Tonhalle	—	
March 4, 2025	Hamburg	Germany	Grosse Freiheit	—	
March 6, 2025	London	England	Indigo at The O2	2,750	
March 8, 2025	Glasgow	Scotland	O2 Academy	—	
March 10, 2025	Paris	France	Zénith	—	
March 12, 2025	Madrid	Spain	Palacio Vistalegre	—	
March 13, 2025	Lisbon	Portugal	Campo Pequeno	—	
April 4, 2025	Manila	Philippines	U.P. Theater	—	
April 6, 2025	Bangkok	Thailand	Thunderdome	—	
April 11, 2025	Jakarta	Indonesia	The Kasablanka Hall	—	
April 13, 2025	Kuala Lumpur	Malaysia	Mega Star Arena	—	
April 19, 2025	Taipei	Taiwan	TICC	—	
April 25, 2025	Singapore		Capitol Theatre	—	
April 27, 2025	Macau		The Venetian Theatre	—	
April 30, 2025	Kanagawa	Japan	KT Zepp Yokohama	—	
May 2, 2025	Osaka	Japan	Namba Hatch	—	
May 3, 2025	Osaka	Japan	Namba Hatch	—	
July 19, 2025	Seoul	South Korea	Jangchung Arena	—	
July 20, 2025	Seoul	South Korea	Jangchung Arena	—	
Total				N/A	

=== Cancelled dates ===
- November 13, 2024 – Toronto, Canada at the History.
