= 10th Asia Artist Awards =

2025 edition of award ceremony

2025 Asia Artist Awards
- Promotional poster
- Date: December 6, 2025
- Venue: National Stadium, Kaohsiung City, Taiwan
- Country: South Korea
- Presented by: Star News; Asia Artists Awards Organising Committee; Motiv 3; D Show
- Hosted by: Lee Jun-ho; Jang Won-young
- Website: asiaartistawards.com

Television/radio coverage
- Network: Streaming: Weverse

The 2025 Asia Artist Awards was an award ceremony held at National Stadium in Kaohsiung City, Taiwan, on December 6, 2025. It is the 10th edition of the annual award show Asia Artist Awards. The award ceremony was hosted by Lee Jun-ho and Jang Won-young. It was broadcast live worldwide via Weverse.

== Background ==
The 10th Asia Artist Awards 2025 took place on Saturday at Kaohsiung National Stadium, followed by "ACON 2025" on Sunday at the same venue to mark the 10th anniversary of the award show.

== Performers ==
=== December 6 (Award ceremony) ===
Performances for Day 1
Artist(s)	Song(s) Performed
AHOF	"Rendezvous"
KiiiKiii	"I Do Me"
Cortis	"Go!" "What You Want"
Nexz	"Beat-Boxer"
Ash Island; Chanmina	"Don't Go" "OST"
KickFlip	"My First Love Song"
Lee Jun-young	"Bounce"
JJ Lin	"Bedroom" "Practice Love" "Back to Back" (with Woodz)
AllDay Project	"Famous" "One More Time"
Xikers	"Superpower (Peak)"
Meovv	"Burning Up" "Hands Up"
QWER	"Dear"
Cravity	"Lemonade Fever"
Kiss of Life	"Maestro of My Heart" "Lucky"
TWS	"Head Shoulders Knees Toes" "Overdrive"
Yena	"Being a Good Girl Hurts"
Riize	"Ember to Solar" "Fame"
Le Sserafim	"Ash" "Hot"
Woodz	"Smashing Concrete" "Drowning"
Ive	"XOXZ" "Attitude" "♥ Beats" "Rebel Heart"
Ateez	"Man on Fire" "In Your Fantasy"
Monsta X	"Trespass" "Love Killa" "Do What I Want"
Stray Kids	"Bleep" "Walkin on Water" "Bounce Back" "Ceremony"

=== December 7 (ACON) ===
Performances for Day 1
Artist(s)	Song(s) Performed
AHOF	"Rendezvous" "The Universe" "Pinocchio"
KiiiKiii	"Dancing Alone" "BTG" "I Do Me"
KickFlip	"Gas on It" "My First Love Song" "Band-Aid"
Nexz	"Beat-Boxer" "I'm Him" "O-RLY?"
SB19	"Dam" "8TonBall" "Dungka!" "Crimzone"
Xikers	"We Don't Stop" "Do or Die" "Iconic"
Ash Island	"Paranoid" "Melody" "It's Okay" "OST"
Lee Jun-young	"Insomnia"
QWER	"My Name is Malguem" "Dear" "Overdive" "T.B.H"
Kiss of Life	"Igloo" "Lips Hips Kiss" "Bad News "Sticky" "Shhh"
Cravity	"Paranoia" "Swish" "Now or Never" "Set Net Go?!" "Lemonade Fever"
Woodz	"Smashing Concrete" "Ready to Fight" "I Hate You" "Bump Bump" "Drowning"
Yena	"It Was Love" "Being a Good Girl Hurts" "Nemonemo" "Smiley"
Ateez	"Ice on My Teeth" "Bouncy (K-Hot Chilli Peppers)" "Work" "In Your Fantasy" "The Real"

== Winners and nominees ==
The winners are listed in alphanumerical order and emphasized in bold.

=== Grand Prize (Daesang) ===
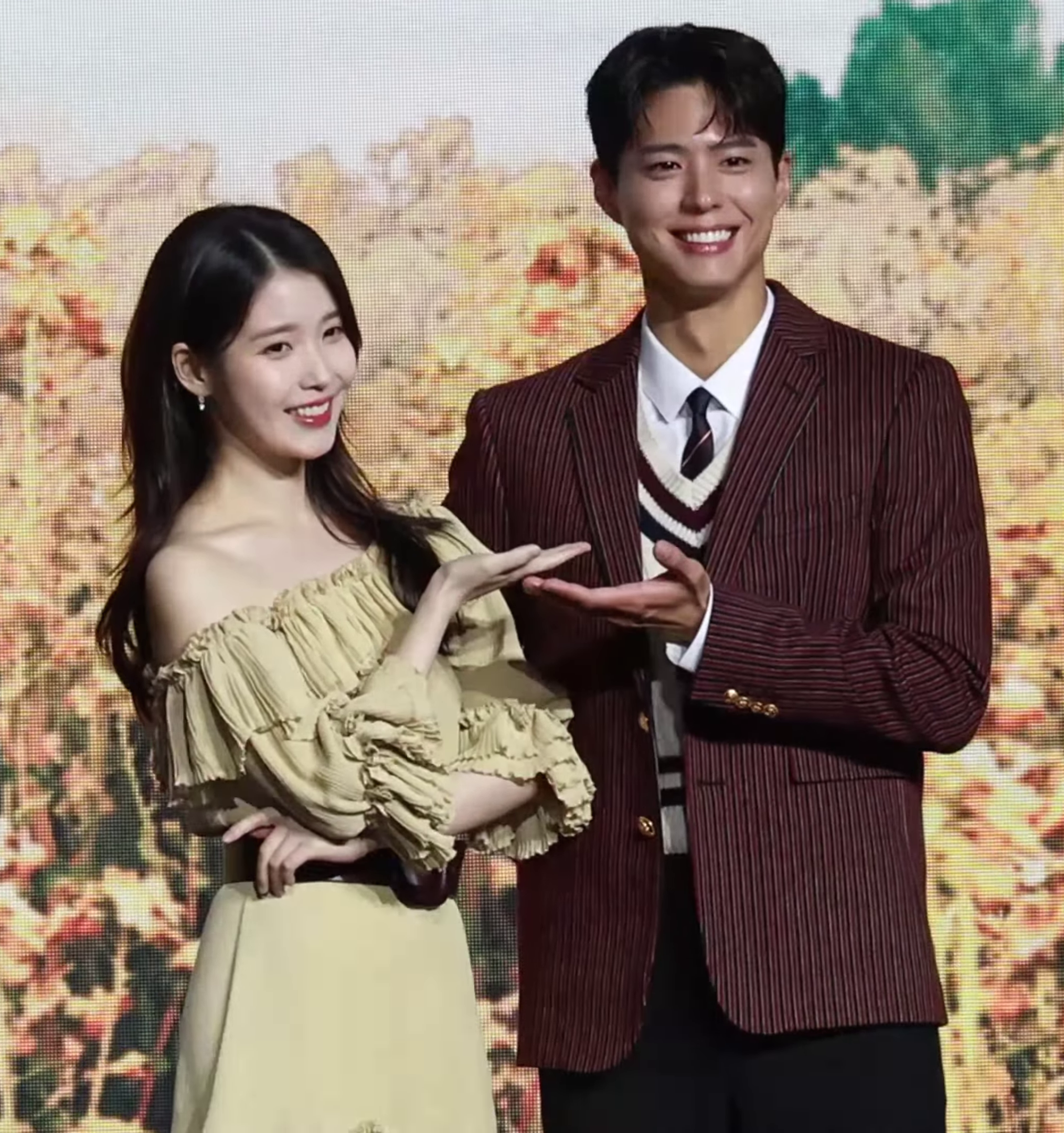
IU (L) and Park Bo-gum (R) each won a Grand Prize (Daesang) in Television/Film for their work on the series When Life Gives You Tangerines during the award show's 10th anniversary in 2025.

Artist of the Year	Album of the Year
**Actor: IU**; **Singer: Stray Kids**	**Stray Kids – Karma**
Song of the Year	Stage of the Year
**Ive – "Rebel Heart"**	**Ateez**
Performance of the Year	Music Icon of the Year
**Riize**	**Le Sserafim**
Actor of the Year	Actress of the Year
**OTT: Park Bo-gum**; **TV: Lee Jun-ho**	**OTT: Moon So-ri**; **TV: Im Yoon-ah**

=== Main awards ===
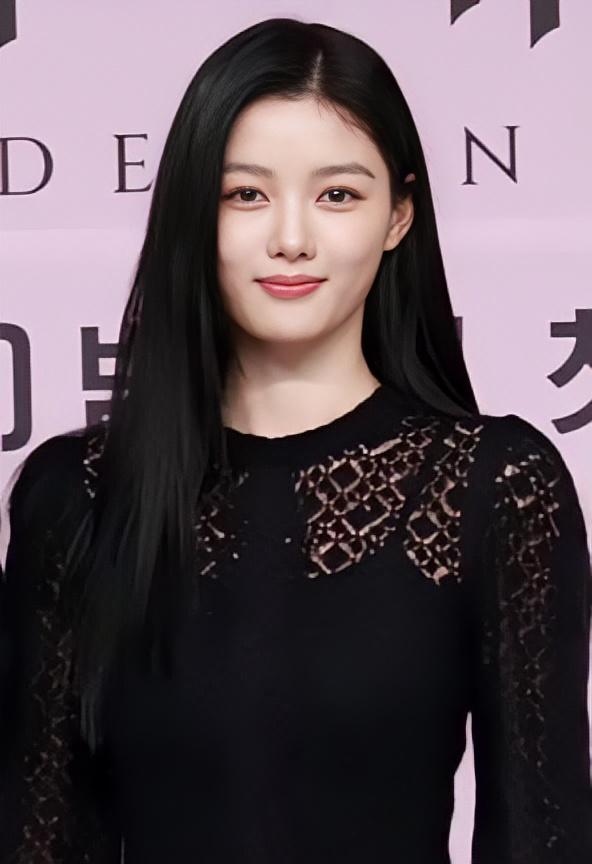
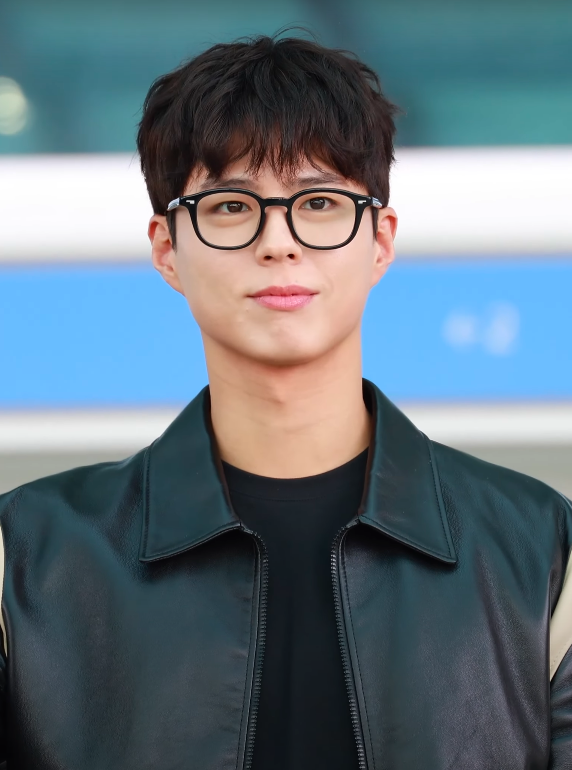
As part of AAA's 10th anniversary celebration, actors Kim You-jung (L) and Park Bo-gum won the Legendary Couple Award for the series Love in the Moonlight which aired in 2016 – the same year the award show was founded

Best Artist	Best Actor
Actor/Actress: **Im Yoon-ah**; **IU**; **Kim You-jung**; **Lee Joon-hyuk**; **Lee Jun-ho**; **Moon So-ri**; **Park Bo-gum**; **Takeru Satoh**; **Uhm Ji-won**; Singer: **AllDay Project**; **Ateez**; **Ive**; **JJ Lin**; **Le Sserafim**; **Monsta X**; **Riize**; **Stray Kids**; **Woodz**	Male: **Choo Young-woo**; **Lee Jun-young**; Female: **Cha Joo-young**; **Hyeri**
Actor/Actress: **Im Yoon-ah**; **IU**; **Kim You-jung**; **Lee Joon-hyuk**; **Lee Jun-ho**; **Moon So-ri**; **Park Bo-gum**; **Takeru Satoh**; **Uhm Ji-won**; Singer: **AllDay Project**; **Ateez**; **Ive**; **JJ Lin**; **Le Sserafim**; **Monsta X**; **Riize**; **Stray Kids**; **Woodz**	Best Musician
Actor/Actress: **Im Yoon-ah**; **IU**; **Kim You-jung**; **Lee Joon-hyuk**; **Lee Jun-ho**; **Moon So-ri**; **Park Bo-gum**; **Takeru Satoh**; **Uhm Ji-won**; Singer: **AllDay Project**; **Ateez**; **Ive**; **JJ Lin**; **Le Sserafim**; **Monsta X**; **Riize**; **Stray Kids**; **Woodz**	Group: **Kiss of Life**; **Meovv**; **TWS**; Solo: **Ash Island**; **Chanmina**; **Yena**
Actor/Actress: **Im Yoon-ah**; **IU**; **Kim You-jung**; **Lee Joon-hyuk**; **Lee Jun-ho**; **Moon So-ri**; **Park Bo-gum**; **Takeru Satoh**; **Uhm Ji-won**; Singer: **AllDay Project**; **Ateez**; **Ive**; **JJ Lin**; **Le Sserafim**; **Monsta X**; **Riize**; **Stray Kids**; **Woodz**	Symbol of AAA
Actor/Actress: **Im Yoon-ah**; **IU**; **Kim You-jung**; **Lee Joon-hyuk**; **Lee Jun-ho**; **Moon So-ri**; **Park Bo-gum**; **Takeru Satoh**; **Uhm Ji-won**; Singer: **AllDay Project**; **Ateez**; **Ive**; **JJ Lin**; **Le Sserafim**; **Monsta X**; **Riize**; **Stray Kids**; **Woodz**	**Jang Won-young**
Best K-pop Record	Best Music Video
**Ateez**; **Ive**; **Stray Kids**	**Meovv – "Hands Up"**
**Ateez**; **Ive**; **Stray Kids**	Best OST
**Ateez**; **Ive**; **Stray Kids**	**Huntrix – "Golden" (from KPop Demon Hunters)**
Best Couple	Best Performance
**IU and Park Bo-gum – When Life Gives You Tangerines**	**Cortis**; **KiiiKiii**
Best Voice Performance	Best Band
**Arden Cho – KPop Demon Hunters**	**QWER**
Best Producer	Potential Award
**3Racha**	**Xikers**
Best Choice	Best New Artist
**Actor: Lee Yi-kyung**; Singer: **Hongjoong**; **Hyunjin**; **Kim Chaewon**; **Shuhua**	**AHOF**; **KickFlip**; **Nexz**
**Actor: Lee Yi-kyung**; Singer: **Hongjoong**; **Hyunjin**; **Kim Chaewon**; **Shuhua**	Emotive Award
**Actor: Lee Yi-kyung**; Singer: **Hongjoong**; **Hyunjin**; **Kim Chaewon**; **Shuhua**	**Actor: Kang You-seok**; **Singer: Riize**
Popularity Award	Rookie of the Year
Actor: **Kim Hye-yoon**; **Lee Jun-ho**; Group: **NiziU**; **Stray Kids**; Solo: **Lim Young-woong**; **Yuqi**	**Actor: Park Yoon-ho**; Singer: **AllDay Project**; **Cortis**; **KiiiKiii**
Actor: **Kim Hye-yoon**; **Lee Jun-ho**; Group: **NiziU**; **Stray Kids**; Solo: **Lim Young-woong**; **Yuqi**	New Wave Award
Actor: **Kim Hye-yoon**; **Lee Jun-ho**; Group: **NiziU**; **Stray Kids**; Solo: **Lim Young-woong**; **Yuqi**	**Actor: Jeong Yun-ho**; **Singer: AllDay Project**
Icon Award	Asia Star Award
**Actor: Choo Young-woo**; **Singer: Cravity**	**Im Yoon-ah**; **JJ Lin**; **Takeru Satoh**
Asia Celebrity Award	Fabulous Award
**Jang Won-young**; **Park Bo-gum**	**IU**; **Lee Jun-ho**
Scene Stealer Award	Hot Trend Award
**Choi Dae-hoon**	**IU**
History of K-pop	Grand Presence of K-pop
**Monsta X**	**Felix**; **Jang Won-young**
Legendary Producer	Legendary K-pop Master Professional
**Bumzu**	**Seo Hyun-joo – Starship Entertainment**
Legendary Couple	Legendary Actor
**Kim You-jung and Park Bo-gum – Love in the Moonlight**	**Lee Joon-hyuk**; **Uhm Ji-won**
Legendary Solo	Legendary Group
**IU**; **G-Dragon**	**Blackpink**; **BTS**

== Multiple awards ==
The following artist(s) received two or more awards:

Count	Artist(s)
6	IU
5	Park Bo-gum
5	Stray Kids
4	Lee Jun-ho
3	AllDay Project
3	Ateez
3	Im Yoon-ah
3	Ive
3	Jang Won-young
3	Riize
2	Choo Young-woo
2	Cortis
2	JJ Lin
2	KiiiKiii
2	Kim You-jung
2	Le Sserafim
2	Lee Joon-hyuk
2	Monsta X
2	Moon So-ri
2	Takeru Satoh
2	Uhm Ji-won
