= Shin Hee-won =

South Korean music video director

Shin Hee-won (Korean: 신희원) is a South Korean music video director who works with ST-WT Productions. He has directed music videos for several K-pop artists, including Red Velvet, Shinee, f(x), Girls' Generation, Taeyeon, NewJeans, and Kiss of Life. His music videos have been nominated or have won awards at the Melon Music Awards, the MAMA Awards, and the Genie Music Awards. Shin's music video for "Bang Bus" by 250 was selected to compete at some international film festivals and won Best Music Video at the K Asif Chambal International Film Festival.

== Career ==
At the start of his career, Shin directed several music videos for SM Entertainment's K-pop idol groups, such as Red Velvet, f(x), Exo, and Shinee, among others. In 2014, he directed the trailer for the South Korean survival show Mix & Match, created to select the final lineup of YG Entertainment's boy group iKon. In 2015, the music videos for f(x)'s "4 Walls" and Shinee's "Married to the Music", both directed by him, were nominated for Best Music Video at the MAMA Awards. In 2016, Red Velvet won Music Video of the Year at the Melon Music Awards for the music video of "Russian Roulette", also directed by him. In November 2018, Shin was interviewed by Jung Il-hoon on Idol Radio, where he expressed his desire to eventually direct a film. That same year, the music video for Shinee's "Good Evening", directed by him, was nominated for Best Music Video at the MAMA Awards.

In 2021, Shin directed the music video for "Bang Bus" by 250 starring Baek Hyun-jin. The video was screened at the Boston International Film Festival, the LA Indie Film Festival, the Swedish International Film Festival, and the Maracay International Film Festival. It won Best Music Video at the K Asif Chambal International Film Festival and was selected to compete at the Miami Short Film Festival and the Woodstock Film Festival. In 2022, he directed music videos for "Attention" by NewJeans, "Feel My Rhythm" by Red Velvet, and "Forever 1" by Girls' Generation, which were all featured on Teen Vogue's list of the best 21 K-pop music video of the year. Red Velvet also won Best Music Video for "Feel My Rhythm" at the 2022 Genie Music Awards. Shin was accused of having plagiarized Tokyo Disneysea's 15th anniversary logo for one of the sets of the music video for "Forever 1". He apologized and stated that he had found an image of the logo online and used it as reference without checking the original source.

== Selected videography ==
=== Music videos ===
Title	Year	Artist(s)	Ref.
"11:11"	2016	Taeyeon	
"24H"	2020	Seventeen	
"365 Fresh"	2017	Triple H	
"4 Walls"	2015	f(x)	
"Adios" (안녕히)	2019	Hoody featuring Gray	
"All My Poetry" (내 안의 모든 시와 소설은)	2025	Close Your Eyes	
"All Night"	2017	Girls' Generation	
"Attention"	2022	NewJeans	
"Automatic"	2015	Red Velvet	
"Babe"	2017	Hyuna	
"Baby Blue"	2025	NCT Wish	
"Bad News"	2023	Kiss of Life	
"Bang Bus" (뱅버스)	2021	250	
"Bloom Bloom"	2019	The Boyz	
"Bye My Neverland" (안녕, 네버랜드)	2023	Kiss of Life	
"Call Back"	2024	Minho	
"Can't Control Myself"	2022	Taeyeon	
"Chiquita"	2022	Rocket Punch	
"Cinder" (사이다)	2018	Norazo	
"Countdown"	2023	Kiss of Life	
"Dadada"	2021	Lunarsolar	
"Dispatch"	2019	Heize featuring Simon Dominic	
"Drink It"	2021	The Boyz	
"Forever 1"	2022	Girls' Generation	
"Feel My Rhythm"	2022	Red Velvet	
"Girls Of The Year"	2024	Vcha	
"#GirlsSpkOut" (featuring Chanmina)	2020	Taeyeon	
"Good Evening" (데리러 가)	2018	Shinee	
"Hate That..."	2021	Key featuring Taeyeon	
"How Sweet"	2024	NewJeans	
"Hurt"	2022	NewJeans	
"Hurt" (250 remix)	2022	NewJeans	
"I Want You"	2018	Shinee	
"Kitty Cat"	2023	Kiss of Life	
"Lip Gloss"	2023	The Boyz	
"Let Me In"	2023	Exo	
"Lotto"	2016	Exo	
"Loveade"	2022	Viviz	
"Love Talk"	2019	WayV	
"Lucky One"	2016	Exo	
"Married to the Music"	2015	Shinee	
"Missing You" (그리워하다)	2017	BtoB	
"Moonwalk" (天选之城)	2019	WayV	
"My First and Last" (마지막 첫사랑)	2017	NCT Dream	
"Nobody Knows"	2023	Kiss of Life	
"Now or Never"	2025	Zerobaseone	
"Number Boy"	2023	Holland	
"One of These Nights"	2016	Red Velvet	
"Only One for Me" (너 없인 안 된다)	2018	BtoB	
"Only One Story"	2024	Zerobaseone	
"Play Love Games"	2023	Kiss of Life	
"Pretty U" (예쁘다)	2016	Seventeen	
"Psycho"	2019	Red Velvet	
"Rookie"	2017	Red Velvet	
"Russian Roulette"	2016	Red Velvet	
"Shhh" (쉿)	2023	Kiss of Life	
"Snowy Summer"	2025	Close Your Eyes	
"Sticky"	2023	Kiss of Life	
"Style"	2025	Hearts2Hearts	
"Sugarcoat"	2023	Kiss Of Life	
"Sugar Rush Ride" (Japanese version)	2023	Tomorrow X Together	
"Super Shy"	2023	NewJeans	
"Tell Me About Your Day" (오늘 뭐 했는지 말해봐)	2019	Kwon Jin-ah	
"The Closer"	2016	VIXX	
"This Christmas"	2017	Taeyeon	
"Umpah Umpah"	2019	Red Velvet	
"View"	2015	Shinee	
"Wish" (Korean version)	2024	NCT Wish	
"Wish" (Japanese version)	2024	NCT Wish	
"Your Home" (너네 집)	2018	Sumin featuring Xin Seha	
