= Lose Yourself (EP) =

2024 EP by Kiss of Life

- Digital cover

EP by Kiss of Life
- Released: October 15, 2024
- Genres: Pop; hip hop; R&B; Latin; EDM
- Length: 19:31
- Languages: Korean; English
- Label: S2

Kiss of Life chronology
Midas Touch (2023)	Lose Yourself (2024)	224 (2025)

Singles from Lose Yourself
- 1. "R.E.M" Released: October 4, 2024; 2. "Get Loud" Released: October 15, 2024

Lose Yourself is the third extended play (EP) by South Korean girl group Kiss of Life. It was released on October 15, 2024 through S2 Entertainment. The EP includes a range of musical styles such as pop, hip hop, R&B, and Latin. The EP consists of seven tracks in total, with lead single "Get Loud" and a pre-release single "R.E.M".

== Title ==
Member Belle said that the album's theme of depicting the process of concentration as "losing oneself. Member Haneul added "it's like being so engrossed in a drama that you can't hear anything else" and "when you're completely focused on one thing, nothing else matters."

== Background and release ==
At the end of 2023, Kiss of Life released their second mini-album, Born to Be XX, after which they released two singles in 2024, Midas Touch and Sticky, and discussed plans for a world tour starting at the end of 2024.

On September 25, 2024, Kiss of Life announced their third mini-album, Lose Yourself, with a release date of October 15, along with an announcement for a pre-release single scheduled for October 4. Unnamed at the time, the pre-release single was revealed to be "R.E.M" through a teaser video released on October 3 shortly before the song's streaming and music video release.

On October 15, Kiss of Life released Lose Yourself, appeared at Yes24 Live Hall in the Gwangjin District of Seoul to promote the mini-album, and unveiled a music video for the lead single, "Get Loud". While at Yes24 Live Hall, group member Natty shared that the group wanted to someday perform a set at Coachella. The release preceded the group's world tour, Kiss Road, which began on October 26 in Olympic Hall.

== Composition ==
In an interview with Consequence of Sound, Julie shared that the group was excited to explore the hip hop genre through songs like "Get Loud" and "Igloo", as the group has been known for more of an R&B sound since their debut. "Back to Me" is more of an "easy and soft" song as described by Haneul. The last song, "No One But Us", incorporates EDM for a sentimental close to the mini-album.

== Track listing ==
Lose Yourself track listing
No.	Title	Lyrics	Music	Arrangement	Length
1.	"Get Loud"	Belle; Ondine; Strawberrybananaclub; Taneisha Jackson; Jinsol	Strawberrybananaclub; Jackson; Belle	Strawberrybananaclub	2:49
2.	"R.E.M"	Emile Ghantous; Gannin Arnold; Cathy Dennis; Any Gabrielly; Livy	Ghantous; Arnold; Dennis; Gabrielly	Ghantous; Arnold	2:52
3.	"Chemistry"	Paprikaa; Jemma; Lim Jungwoo; Jo Yoon-kyung	Paprikaa; Jemma; Lim	Paprikaa	3:04
4.	"Igloo"	Arineh; Hiss Noise	Hiss Noise; Arineh	Hiss Noise	2:11
5.	"Too Many Alex"	Joh!; Su Hyuk; Perrie; Strawberrybananaclub	Strawberrybananaclub; Perrie; Joh!; Su Hyuk	Strawberrybananaclub	2:36
6.	"Back to Me"	Yoshi Breen; Jason OK; Frida Amundsen; Park Sunghee; bay (153/Joombas); Na Jeongah	Breen; Jason OK; Amundsen	Jason OK; Breen	2:50
7.	"No One but Us"	Willemjin May; Samuel "Samson" Son; Adora; Strawberrybananaclub	Strawberrybananaclub; Adora; Son; May	Strawberrybananaclub	3:05
Total length:					19:31

== Charts ==
=== Weekly charts ===
Weekly chart performance for Lose Yourself
Chart (2024)	Peak position
Japanese Albums (Oricon)	25
Japanese Combined Albums (Oricon)	39
South Korean Albums (Circle)	6

=== Monthly charts ===
Monthly chart performance for Lose Yourself
Chart (2024)	Peak position
South Korean Albums (Circle)	11
