= Hye-won =

- Hangul: 혜원
- RR: Hyewon
- MR: Hyewŏn
- IPA: [çewʌn]

Hye-won is a Korean given name.

== People ==
People with this name include:

- Shin Yun-bok (1758–1813), pen name Hyewon, Joseon dynasty painter
- Park Hye-won (born 1983), South Korean short track speed skater
- Eom Hye-won (born 1991), South Korean badminton player
- Kang Hye-won (born 1999), South Korean actress
- Belle (born Shim Hye-won, 2004) South Korean singer, member of Kiss of Life

== Fictional characters ==
Fictional characters with this name include:

- Shim Hye-won, in 2003 South Korean television series Summer Scent
- Kang Hye-won, in 2004 South Korean television series Full House
- Han Hye-won, in 2006 South Korean film Now and Forever
- Kim Hye-won, in 2010 South Korean television series The Slave Hunters
- Park Hye-won, in 2010 South Korean television series Dandelion Family
- Oh Hye-won, in 2014 South Korean television series Secret Love Affair
- Choi Hye-won, in 2014 South Korean television series Gunman in Joseon

== See also ==
- List of Korean given names
