= Get Loud =

Get Loud may refer to:

- "Get Loud" (song), by Kiss of Life (2024)
- Get Loud (album), by Adam Brand (2004)
- "Get Loud", song by Coi Leray from Coi (2023)
- "Get Loud", song by Twice from Feel Special (2019)
- Get Loud!, album by Agnostic Front (2019)
- "Get Loud!", song by Wanessa from DNA (2011)
