= 224 (EP) =

- Digital cover

EP by Kiss of Life
- Released: June 9, 2025
- Length: 20:20
- Languages: Korean; English
- Label: S2

Kiss of Life chronology
Lose Yourself (2024)	224 (2025)	Tokyo Mission (2025)

Singles from 224
- 1. "Lips Hips Kiss" Released: June 9, 2025

224 is the fourth extended play (EP) by South Korean girl group Kiss of Life. It was released on June 9, 2025, through S2 Entertainment. The EP contains seven tracks, including the lead single "Lips Hips Kiss".

== Title ==
According to S2 Entertainment, the title 224 represents "today, tomorrow and forever". Member Belle explained that the EP follows a journey of self-discovery, portraying a person who breaks free from suppression and discovers their true identity.

== Background ==
On April 2, 2025, it was reported that Kiss of Life will release a new album in June. On May 19, 2025, Kiss of Life released a teaser for their fourth mini album 224, set for release on June 9.

== Composition ==
The title track "Lips Hips Kiss" draws from early 2000s R&B and hip-hop, delivering a sensual mood that captures the intensity of mutual attraction. With sleek vocals and feminine yet fierce tones, the song taps into a modern Y2K vibe that's both nostalgic and fresh. Natty participated in writing the lyrics for "Tell Me" and "Painting", while Julie contributed to "Heart of Gold".

== Critical reception ==
"Lips Hips Kiss" was ranked #11 on Billboard's 25 best K-pop songs of 2025.

== Track listing ==
224 track listing
No.	Title	Lyrics	Music	Arrangement	Length
1.	"Lips Hips Kiss"	Mia (153/Joombas)	Benjamin 55; Duii; Brandy Hayes	Benjamin 55; Duii	3:09
2.	"Tell Me"	Gemma; Natty	Neptune NPN013; Jsong	Neptune NPN013	2:59
3.	"k bye"	279; Jorgen Odegard; Upsahl; Steph Jones	Jorgen Odegard; Upsahl; Steph Jones	Jorgen Odegard	2:09
4.	"Painting"	Yoon (153/Joombas), Kim Min-ji (JamFactory); Natty	Jude Cole; Jesse Cole	Jude Cole	2:32
5.	"Slide"	Taneisha Jackson; Stella Jones; Strawberrybananaclub	Strawberrybananaclub; Taneisha Jackson; Stella Jones	Strawberrybananaclub	3:06
6.	"Heart of Gold"	Julie; PAPRIKAA	PAPRIKAA; Im Jungwoo; (Jang Han Na) (153/Joombas)	PAPRIKAA	3:26
7.	"Think Twice"	Ondine; Jin Sol	Jin Sol; Ninos Hanna; Maya Rose; 153/Joombas	Jin Sol	2:59
Total length:					20:20

== Charts ==
=== Weekly charts ===
Weekly chart performance for 224
Chart (2026)	Peak position
South Korean Albums (Circle)	39

=== Monthly charts ===
Monthly chart performance for 224
Chart (2026)	Peak position
South Korean Albums (Circle)	14
