= Forever 1 =

- Digital cover

Studio album by Girls' Generation
- Released: August 5, 2022
- Studios: SM (Seoul); MonoTree (Seoul)
- Genre: K-pop
- Length: 32:39
- Language: Korean
- Labels: SM; Dreamus
- Producers: Lee Soo-man; Kenzie

Girls' Generation chronology
Holiday Night (2017)	Forever 1 (2022)

Singles from Forever 1
- 1. "Forever 1" Released: August 5, 2022

Forever 1 is the seventh Korean studio album and tenth overall by South Korean girl group Girls' Generation. It was released digitally on August 5 and physically on August 8, 2022, by SM Entertainment to commemorate the group's fifteenth anniversary since their debut in 2007. Forever 1 is Girls' Generation first music release in five years, following their hiatus after the release of their sixth Korean studio album Holiday Night (2017). The album contains ten tracks, including the lead single of the same name.

== Background and release ==
On May 17, 2022, SM Entertainment announced that Girls' Generation would be returning for their fifteenth anniversary with a new album in August, ending their five-year hiatus. On July 4, member Sooyoung teased on tvN's Take Care of Me This Week that the group would be releasing their seventh studio album. On July 24, SM Entertainment announced that the group would be releasing their seventh studio album, titled Forever 1, on August 8. One day later, the promotional schedule was released, with the digital version of the album to be released on August 5, three days earlier than the physical release, to commemorate the fifteenth anniversary. On July 27, it was announced that Forever 1 would contain ten tracks, including lead single "Forever 1". Songwriter Kenzie, who previously helped write the group's singles "Into The New World" (2007), "Oh!" (2010), and "All Night" (2017), announced to be participating in the album's production. Two days later, the album's mood sampler was released. Music video teasers for "Forever 1" were released on July 4 and 5. The album was released digitally alongside the music video for "Forever 1" on August 5.

== Composition ==
Forever 1 consists of ten tracks. The lead single "Forever 1" was described as dance-pop song with "energetic melody" and "exciting festival-like atmosphere" with lyrics about "eternal love for precious people who give strength anytime and anywhere". The second track, "Lucky Like That", is a pop song characterized by "strong guitar performance and powerful drum beats". The third track, "Seventeen", is an R&B dance song with a "synth sound, heavy drum beats, and light piano melody"; members Tiffany and Sooyoung participating write lyrics for the song. The fourth track "Villain" was described as a dance song with "heavy bass and drum beat", with lyrics written by Tiffany and Sooyoung and the former also participating the composition. The fifth track, "You Better Run", is an electropop song with "sharp sound and strong vocals" and lyrics about "a main character who returns and making the opponent fall into fear after foretelling revenge earlier", labeled a continuation from the group's 2010 single "Run Devil Run".

"Closer" was described as a pop song with "light piano riff and sensual disco rhythm" and "an exciting vibe". "Mood Lamp," the seventh track, is an R&B song with a "soft guitar melody that creates a warm atmosphere" and lyrics that "compare the desire to protect a loved one from darkness to a scene where a mood lamp softly illuminates the bedside". The eighth track, "Summer Night", was described as medium-tempo pop song characterized by "bouncing synth and beautiful melody". The ninth track, "Freedom", is a "dreamy" synth-pop song with "rich harmony" and lyrics "about discovering who you really are and feeling free when you are with the person you love". The last track, "Paper Plane", was described as a medium-tempo pop song with "heavy bass and a cheerful flux synth" and lyrics containing "warm messages of supports for those who endlessly pursue their dreams with paper airplanes".

== Commercial performance ==
Forever 1 debuted at number two on South Korea's Circle Album Chart in the chart issue dated August 7–13, 2022; on the monthly chart, the album debuted at number five in the chart issue dated August 2022. In Japan, the album debuted at number 18 on the Billboard Japan Hot Albums in the chart issue dated August 10, 2022. On the Oricon's chart, the album debuted at number 14 on the Albums Chart in the chart issue dated August 29, 2022; on the monthly chart, the album debuted at number 48 in the chart issue dated August 2022. The album also debuted at number four on the Digital Albums Chart in the chart issue dated August 15, 2022, and number 48 on the Combined Albums Chart in the chart issue dated August 22, 2022. It ascended to number nine on the Oricon Albums Chart, and number eight on the Combined Albums Chart in the chart issue dated September 12, 2022.

In the United States, Forever 1 debuted at number 16 on the Billboard Heatseekers Album, and number 88 on the Billboard Top Current Album Sales in the chart issue dated August 20, 2022. In the United Kingdom, the album debuted at position 28 on the OCC's UK Digital Albums in the chart issue dated August 12–18, 2022. In Australia, the album debuted at number ten on the ARIA Top 50 Digital Albums Chart, and number one on the ARIA Top 20 Hitseekers Albums Chart in the chart issue dated August 15, 2022.

== Critical reception ==
Professional ratings
Review scores
Source	Rating
NME	4/5 stars
Pitchfork	7.2/10

Forever 1 received generally positive reviews by critics. In a four-star review, Tanu I. Raj of NME described Forever 1 as "a revisit of their classic sounds and songs that were recast into a more modern, mature image, creating a charming medley of the past and the present". Joshua Minsoo Kim of Pitchfork praised the album for being a "concise record" and named it among Girls' Generation's best due to the group's "lack of musical identity compared to their juniors, making them as versatile as ever". Nylon and Idology ranked it amongst the best K-pop albums of 2022.

== Promotion ==
Prior to the release of Forever 1, on August 5, 2022, the group held a live event called "Girls' Generation 'Forever 1' Countdown Live" on YouTube and TikTok to introduce the album and to commemorate their fifteenth anniversary with their fans.

== Track listing ==
Track listing for Forever 1
No.	Title	Lyrics	Music	Arrangement	Length
1.	"Forever 1"	Kenzie	Kenzie; Ylva Dimberg	Kenzie; Moonshine	3:22
2.	"Lucky Like That"	Hwang Yu-bin (Verygoods)	Sebastian Thott; Linnea Deb; David Strääf	Sebastian Thott	2:51
3.	"Seventeen"	Lee On-eul; Sooyoung; Tiffany	Daniel "Obi" Klein; Charli Taft; Andreas Öberg; Emily Kim	Daniel "Obi" Klein; Imlay	3:08
4.	"Villain"	Sooyoung; Tiffany	Tiffany; Josh Cumbee	Josh Cumbee; Moonshine	3:02
5.	"You Better Run"	Moon Hye-min	Grace Tither; Kyle MacKenzie; Keir MacCulloch; Katya Edwards	Kyle MacKenzie; Keir MacCulloch	2:45
6.	"Closer"	Moon Hye-min	Peter Wallevik; Daniel Davidsen; Katy Tizzard; Joe Killington	PhD	3:58
7.	"Mood Lamp"	Jo Yoon-kyung	Jamie Jones; Jack Kugell; Lamont Neuble; Tim Stewart; Treasure Davis	Jamie Jones; Jack Kugell; Lamont Neuble; Tim Stewart	3:48
8.	"Summer Night" (Korean: 완벽한 장면; RR: Wanbyeokhan Jangmyeon)	Yun (153/Joombas)	Royal Dive; Sofia Kay	Royal Dive	3:13
9.	"Freedom"	Jeong Ha-ri (153/Joombas)	Gabriella Bishop; Camden Cox; Cameron Warren	St. Louis	3:02
10.	"Paper Plane" (Korean: 종이비행기; RR: Jongi-bihaenggi)	Charlie (153/Joombas)	Moa "Cazzi Opeia" Carlebecker; Emily Kim; Fredrik "Figge" Hakan Boström	Fredrik "Figge" Hakan Boström	3:30
Total length:					32:39

== Credits and personnel ==
Credits adapted from album's liner notes.

Studio

- SM Lvyin Studio – recording (track 1, 9), mixing (track 6), digital editing (track 1, 9)
- SM Yellow Tail Studio – recording (track 2–3, 6–7, 10), digital editing (track 7, 10)
- SM Ssam Studio – recording (track 4–5, 7–8, 10), digital editing (track 4–5, 8), engineered for mix (track 4)
- SM Big Shot Studio – recording (track 5, 7, 10), mixing (track 7, 9)
- MonoTree Studio – recording (track 6–10)
- SM Blue Ocean Studio – mixing (track 1, 5)
- SM Blue Cup Studio – mixing (track 2, 4)
- SM Concert Hall Studio – mixing (track 3, 8)
- SM Starlight Studio – mixing (track 10), digital editing (track 2–3)
- 821 Sound Mastering – mastering (all tracks)
- Sound Pool Studios – digital editing (track 2–3)
- Doobdoob Studio – digital editing (track 4–6)

Personnel

- SM Entertainment – executive producer
- Lee Soo-man – producer
- Kenzie – producer (all tracks), director (all tracks), lyrics (track 1), composition (track 1), arrangement (track 1), vocal directing (track 4–5)
- Lee Sung-soo – production director, executive supervisor
- Tak Young-joon – executive supervisor
- Yoo Young-jin – music and sound supervisor
- Girls' Generation – vocals (all tracks), background vocals (track 1, 8)
  - Taeyeon – background vocals (track 4, 10)
  - Sooyoung – background vocals (track 4), lyrics (track 3–4)
  - Tiffany – background vocals (track 4), lyrics (track 3–4), composition (track 4), vocal directing (track 4)
  - Seohyun – background vocals (track 4–5)
  - Yuri – background vocals (track 10)
- Ylva Dimberg – background vocals, composition (track 1)
- Lee Yu-ra – background vocals (track 2–3)
- Josh Cumbee – background vocals, composition, arrangement (track 4)
- Grace Tither – background vocals, composition (track 5)
- Kyle MacKenzie – background vocals, composition, arrangement (track 5)
- Keir MacCulloch – background vocals, composition, arrangement (track 5)
- Kwon Ye-jin – background vocals (track 6–7)
- Choi Hae-jin – background vocals (track 9)
- Gabriella Bishop – background vocals, composition (track 9)
- St. Louis – background vocals, arrangement (track 9)
- Jeon Ae-jin – background vocals (track 10)
- Moa "Cazzi Opeia" Carlebecker – background vocals, composition (track 10)
- Hwang Yu-bin (Verygoods) – lyrics (track 2)
- Lee On-eul – lyrics (track 3)
- Moon Hye-min – lyrics (track 5–6)
- Jo Yoon-kyung – lyrics (track 7)
- Yun (153/Joombas) – lyrics (track 8)
- Jeong Ha-ri (153/Joombas) – lyrics (track 9)
- Charlie (153/Joombas) – lyrics (track 10)
- Sebastian Thott – composition, arrangement (track 2)
- Linnea Deb – composition (track 2)
- David Strääf – composition (track 2)
- Daniel "Obi" Klein – composition, arrangement (track 3)
- Charli Taft – composition (track 3)
- Andreas Öberg – composition (track 3)
- Emily Kim – composition (track 3, 10)
- Katya Edwards – composition (track 5)
- Peter Wallevik – composition (track 6)
- Daniel Davidsen – composition (track 6)
- Katy Tizzard – composition (track 6)
- Joe Killington – composition (track 6)
- Jamie Jones – composition, arrangement (track 7)
- Jack Kugell – composition, arrangement (track 7)
- Lamont Neuble – composition, arrangement (track 7)
- Tim Stewart – composition, arrangement (track 7)
- Treasure Davis – composition (track 7)
- Royal Dive – composition, arrangement (track 8)
- Sofia Kay – composition (track 8)
- Camden Cox – composition (track 9)
- Cameron Warren – composition (track 9)
- Fredrik "Figge" Hakan Boström – composition, arrangement (track 10)
- Moonshine – arrangement (track 1, 4)
- Imlay – arrangement (track 3)
- PhD – arrangement (track 6)
- Lee Ji-hong – recording, digital editing (track 1), mixing (track 6)
- Noh Min-ji – recording (track 2–3, 6–7, 9–10), digital editing (track 7, 9–10)
- Kang Eun-ji – recording (track 4–5, 7–8, 10), digital editing (track 4–5, 8), engineered for mix (track 4)
- Lee Min-kyu – recording (track 5, 7, 10), mixing (track 7, 9)
- Lee Joo-hyung – recording, vocal directing, Pro Tools (track 6–7, 10)
- Choo Dae-gwan – recording (track 8), vocal directing (track 4, 8), Pro Tools (track 5)
- G-high – recording (track 9), vocal directing (track 2–3, 9), Pro Tools (track 2–3, 9)
- Kim Chul-soon – mixing (track 1, 5)
- Jeong Ui-seok – mixing (track 2, 4)
- Nam Gung-jin – mixing (track 3, 8)
- Lee Ji-heung – mixing (track 6)
- Jeong Yu-ra – mixing (track 10), digital editing (track 2–3)
- Kwon Nam-woo – mastering (all tracks)
- Kriz – vocal directing (track 4)
- Kim Yeo-seo – vocal directing (track 8)
- Jeong Ho-jin – digital editing (track 2–3)
- Kwon Yoo-jin – digital editing (track 4–6)
- Kang Sun-young – digital editing (track 7, 9–10)

== Charts ==
=== Weekly charts ===
Weekly chart performance for Forever 1
Chart (2022)	Peak position
Australian Digital Albums (ARIA)	10
Australian Hitseekers Albums (ARIA)	1
Japanese Albums (Oricon)	9
Japanese Combined Albums (Oricon)	8
Japanese Hot Albums (Billboard Japan)	18
South Korean Albums (Circle)	2
UK Digital Albums (OCC)	28
US Heatseekers Albums (Billboard)	16
US Top Current Album Sales (Billboard)	88

=== Monthly charts ===
Monthly chart performance for Forever 1
Chart (2022)	Peak position
Japanese Albums (Oricon)	30
South Korean Albums (Circle)	5

=== Year-end charts ===
Year-end chart performance for Forever 1
Chart (2022)	Peak position
South Korea Albums (Circle)	46

== Certifications and sales ==
Certifications and sales for Forever 1
Region	Certification	Certified units/sales
Japan	—	13,401
South Korea (KMCA)	Platinum	294,948

== Release history ==
Release history for Forever 1
Region	Date	Format	Label
Various	August 5, 2022	Digital download; streaming	SM; Dreamus
South Korea	August 8, 2022	CD	SM; Dreamus

== See also ==
- List of certified albums in South Korea
