= Forever 1 (song) =

- Remixes cover

Single by Girls' Generation

from the album Forever 1
- Language: Korean
- Released: August 5, 2022
- Genre: Dance-pop
- Length: 3:22
- Label: SM; Dreamus
- Composers: Kenzie; Ylva Dimberg
- Lyricist: Kenzie
- Producers: Lee Soo-man; Kenzie

Girls' Generation singles chronology
| "Holiday" (2017) | "Forever 1" (2022) |

Music video
- "Forever 1" on YouTube

"Forever 1" is a song recorded by South Korean girl group Girls' Generation for their seventh studio album of the same name. It was released as the album's lead single by SM Entertainment on August 5, 2022.

== Background and release ==
On May 17, 2022, SM Entertainment announced Girls' Generation would be returning for their fifteenth anniversary with a new album in August, ending their five year hiatus. On July 4, member Sooyoung teased on tvN's Take Care of Me This Week that the group would be releasing their seventh studio album. On July 25, SM Entertainment announced they would be releasing their seventh studio album titled Forever 1 on August 8. A day later, the promotional schedule was released with the digital version announced to be released three days earlier on August 5 to commemorate the fifteenth anniversary. On July 27, it was announced that Forever 1 would contains ten tracks including the lead single "Forever 1", on which songwriter Kenzie, who previously worked with the group for their singles "Into The New World" (2007), "Oh!" (2010), and "All Night" (2017), announced to be participating in the single's production. The music video teasers was released on July 4–5. The song was released alongside the album and its music video on August 5. The remix EP by Matisse & Sadko, Aiobahn, and Mar Vista, titled iScreaM Vol. 19: Forever 1 Remixes, was released on November 17.

== Composition ==
"Forever 1" was written, composed, and arranged by Kenzie alongside Ylva Dimberg for the composition, and Moonshine for the arrangement. It was described as dance-pop song with "energetic melody", "exciting festival-like atmosphere", and "refreshing vibe for the summer" with lyrics about "eternal love for precious people who give strength anytime and anywhere" that "alternate between a playful love song and a celebration of the group's longstanding relationship with each other" and contains the meaning of "let's be forever". "Forever 1" was composed in the key of A major, with a tempo of 124 beats per minute.

== Music video ==
The music video directed by Shin Hee-won was released alongside the song by SM Entertainment on August 5, 2022. The music video portrays the members "living the high life such as flying on private jets, riding in limousines, being bombarded by paparazzi, DJing at clubs" with scenes that switches between their high life and them "performing together in tightly choreographed scenes on a cruise ship and a colorful parade float".

The music video was chosen as one of the best K-pop videos of the year by Teen Vogue.

== Commercial performance ==
"Forever 1" debuted at number 75 on South Korea's Circle Digital Chart in the chart issue dated July 31 – August 6, 2022. It ascended to number five in the chart issue dated August 21–27, 2022. The song also debuted at number three on the Billboard South Korea Songs in the chart issue dated August 20, 2022.

In Japan, "Forever 1" debuted at number 56 on the Billboard Japan Hot 100 in the chart issue dated August 17, 2022. In Singapore, the song debuted at number seven on the RIAS Top Streaming Chart, and number four on the RIAS Top Regional Chart in the chart issue dated August 5–11, 2022. The song also debuted at number six on the Billboard Singapore Songs in the chart issue dated August 20, 2022. In Malaysia, the song debuted at number eight on the Billboard Malaysia Songs in the chart issue dated August 20, 2022. In Indonesia, the song debuted at number 14 on the Billboard Indonesia Songs in the chart issue dated August 20, 2022. In Hong Kong, the song debuted at number 13 on the Billboard Hong Kong Songs in the chart issue dated August 20, 2022. In Taiwan, the song debuted at number four on the Billboard Taiwan Songs in the chart issue dated August 20, 2022. In Vietnam, the song debuted at number 13 on the Billboard Vietnam Hot 100 in the chart issue dated August 18, 2022.

In United States, the song debuted at number four on the Billboard World Digital Song Sales in the chart issue dated August 20, 2022. In New Zealand, the song debuted at number 17 on the RMNZ Hot Singles in the chart issue dated August 15, 2022. In Australia, the song debuted at number 17 on the ARIA Top 20 Hitseekers Singles Chart in the chart issue dated July 18, 2022. Globally, the song debuted at number 67 on the Billboard Global 200, and number 41 on the Billboard Global Excl. U.S in the chart issue dated August 20, 2022.

== Promotion ==
Prior to the release of Forever 1, on August 5, 2022, the group held a live event called "Girls' Generation 'Forever 1' Countdown Live" on YouTube and TikTok to introduce the album and its songs, including "Forever 1", and to commemorate their fifteenth anniversary with their fans. Following the album release, they were initially scheduled to perform on two music programs: Mnet's M Countdown on August 11, and SBS's Inkigayo on August 14, however both appearances were cancelled on August 9, due to member Seohyun diagnosed with COVID-19. They subsequently appeared on three music programs: KBS's Music Bank on August 19, MBC's Show! Music Core on August 20, and SBS's Inkigayo on August 21.

== Track listing ==
- Digital download / streaming (iScreaM Vol. 19: Forever 1 Remixes)
1. "Forever 1" (Matisse & Sadko remix) – 3:33
2. "Forever 1" (Aiobahn remix) – 4:34
3. "Forever 1" (Mar Vista remix) – 3:17
4. "Forever 1" (Matisse & Sadko remix; extended version) – 4:32
5. "Forever 1" (Aiobahn remix; extended version) – 5:40
6. "Forever 1" (Mar Vista remix; extended version) – 5:15

== Credits and personnel ==
Credits adapted from the album's liner notes.

Studio

- SM Lvyin Studio – recording, digital editing
- SM Blue Ocean Studio – mixing
- 821 Sound Mastering – mastering

Personnel

- SM Entertainment – executive producer
- Lee Soo-man – producer
- Kenzie – producer, director, lyrics, composition, arrangement
- Lee Sung-soo – production director, executive supervisor
- Tak Young-joon – executive supervisor
- Yoo Young-jin – music and sound supervisor
- Girls' Generation – vocals, background vocals
- Ylva Dimberg – background vocals, composition
- Moonshine – arrangement
- Lee Ji-hong – recording, digital editing
- Kim Chul-soon – mixing
- Kwon Nam-woo – mastering

== Charts ==
=== Weekly charts ===
Weekly chart performance for "Forever 1"
| Chart (2022) | Peak position |
|---|---|
| Australia Hitseekers (ARIA) | 17 |
| Global 200 (Billboard) | 67 |
| Hong Kong (Billboard) | 13 |
| Indonesia (Billboard) | 14 |
| Japan (Japan Hot 100) | 56 |
| Malaysia (Billboard) | 8 |
| New Zealand Hot Singles (RMNZ) | 17 |
| Singapore (Billboard) | 6 |
| Singapore (RIAS) | 7 |
| South Korea (Circle) | 5 |
| Taiwan (Billboard) | 4 |
| US World Digital Song Sales (Billboard) | 4 |
| Vietnam (Vietnam Hot 100) | 13 |

=== Monthly charts ===
Monthly chart performance for "Forever 1"
| Chart (2022) | Peak position |
|---|---|
| South Korea (Circle) | 6 |

=== Year-end charts ===
2022 year-end chart performance for "Forever 1"
| Chart (2022) | Peak position |
|---|---|
| South Korea (Circle) | 66 |

2023 year-end chart performance for "Forever 1"
| Chart (2023) | Position |
|---|---|
| South Korea (Circle) | 180 |

== Accolades ==
=== Listicles ===
Name of publisher, year listed, name of listicle, and placement
| Publisher | Listicle | Placement | Ref. |
|---|---|---|---|
| Billboard | The 25 Best K-Pop Songs of 2022: Staff Picks | 13th | |
| Cosmopolitan | The 15 Best K-Pop Songs of 2022, Ranked | 2nd | |
| Dazed | The Best K-pop Tracks of 2022 | 12th | |
| Idology | Closing 2022: The 20 Songs of the Year | Placed | |
| Teen Vogue | The 21 Best K-Pop Music Videos of 2022 | Placed | |
| Teen Vogue | The 79 Best K-Pop Songs of 2022 | Placed | |

== Release history ==
Release history for "Forever 1"
| Region | Date | Format | Version | Label |
|---|---|---|---|---|
| Various | August 5, 2022 | Digital download; streaming | Original | SM; Dreamus |
| Various | November 17, 2022 | Digital download; streaming | Remixes | SM; ScreaM; Dreamus |
