= Kiss of Life (EP) =

- Digital Cover

EP by Kiss of Life
- Released: July 5, 2023
- Genres: Dance-pop; hip-hop; rock; R&B
- Length: 18:06
- Language: Korean
- Label: S2

Kiss of Life chronology
| Kiss of Life (2023) | Born to Be XX (2023) |

Singles from Kiss of Life
- 1. "Shhh" Released: July 5, 2023

Kiss of Life is the debut extended play (EP) by South Korean girl group Kiss of Life. It was released on July 5, 2023, through S2 Entertainment. The EP contains six tracks, including the lead single "Shhh".

== Title ==
Julie explained that "Kiss of Life, which is our group's name and the title of our EP, refers to the mouth-to-mouth artificial respiration method. Like the name, we plan on revitalizing and bringing fresh life to the K-pop scene”.

== Background ==
Natty was a contestant on the South Korean reality survival shows Sixteen and Idol School, which led to the formation of Twice and Fromis 9, where she finished in 11th and 13th place respectively. In both shows, she made it to the final episode, but was ultimately not chosen for the final line-up of the groups. Belle was known as both the daughter of veteran Korean singer Shim Shin. and for taking part in composing and writing songs for several artists such as Le Sserafim, Purple Kiss, and Miyeon. She also participated on the background vocals of various songs.

On July 12, 2022, Natty signed an exclusive contract with S2 Entertainment. In December 2022, Natty featured in a British documentary about K-pop trainees along with Julie, Belle, and two other unknown trainees. On December 27, 2022, S2 Entertainment announced they were preparing to launch a new girl group in 2023.

== Promotion and release ==
On June 12, 2023, another teaser was released, announcing the group's debut on July 5, 2023, with their first EP Kiss of Life.

Beginning with "Sugarcoat" by Natty on June 18, 2023, solo music videos of "Countdown" by Belle, "Kitty Cat" by Julie, and "Play Love Games" by Haneul were released in the following days. On June 27, 2023, the music video of a B-side of the EP, "Bye My Neverland", which connects all of the solos' music videos, was released along with the music video teaser for the lead single "Shhh" on July 3, 2023.

== Critical reception ==
Professional ratings
Review scores
| Source | Rating |
|---|---|
| IZM | 4.5/5 stars |

Lee Seung-won from IZM gave the album 4.5 stars out of five, writing that "Rather than being very fresh or sophisticated, it is a solid and heavy appearance. "'Kiss Of Life" fulfills its function as a debut album almost perfectly with its high level of completion and clear self-introduction, paving the way for the group to move forward evenly. The appearance of a new name is always welcome, and the backbone of K-pop has become even stronger."

Kiss of Life on critic lists
| Publication | List | Rank | Ref. |
|---|---|---|---|
| NME | The 25 best Asian albums of 2023 | 19 | |

== Accolades ==
Awards and nominations for Kiss of Life
| Organization | Year | Award | Result | Ref. |
|---|---|---|---|---|
| MAMA Awards | 2023 | Album of the Year | Nominated | |

== Track listing ==
Kiss of Life track listing
| No. | Title | Lyrics | Music | Arrangement | Length |
|---|---|---|---|---|---|
| 1. | "Shhh" (쉿; Shh) | Rick Bridges; Strawberrybananaclub; Belle; Julie | Strawberrybananaclub; Rick Bridges; Belle; Natty | Strawberrybananaclub | 3:02 |
| 2. | "Bye My Neverland" (안녕네버랜드; annyeong nebeolaendeu) | BYMORE; Ondine; Strawberrybananaclub; Julie | BYMORE; Ondine; Strawberrybananaclub; Julie; Haneul | BYMORE; Ondine; Strawberrybananaclub | 3:23 |
| 3. | "Sugarcoat" (Natty solo) | Jo Yoon-kyung | Uzoechi Emenike; Chloe Martini | Chloe Martini | 2:59 |
| 4. | "Countdown" (Belle solo) | Gemma; Belle | Royal Dive; Belle | Royal Dive | 2:51 |
| 5. | "Kitty Cat" (Julie solo) | Park Seong-hee; Chae-rin (153/Joombas); Mok Ji-min (Lalara Studio); JaeH | JaeH | JaeH | 2:50 |
| 6. | "Play Love Games" (Haneul solo) | Moon Sulli | Skylar Mones; Hollyn Shadinger; Alna Hofmeyr | Skylar Mones | 3:00 |
| Total length: | | | | | 18:06 |

== Charts ==
=== Weekly charts ===
Weekly chart performance for Kiss of Life
| Chart (2023) | Peak position |
|---|---|
| South Korean Albums (Circle) | 18 |

=== Monthly charts ===
Monthly chart performance for Kiss of Life
| Chart (2023) | Position |
|---|---|
| South Korean Albums (Circle) | 46 |

== Release history ==
Release history and formats for Kiss of Life
| Region | Date | Format | Label |
|---|---|---|---|
| South Korea | July 5, 2023 | CD | S2 |
| Various | July 5, 2023 | Digital download; streaming | S2 |
