= Midas Touch (Kiss of Life song) =

- Digital album cover

Single by Kiss of Life

from the album Midas Touch
- B-side: "Nothing"
- Released: April 3, 2024
- Length: 2:42
- Label: S2
- Composers: Ondine; Samson; Strawberrybananaclub
- Lyricists: Mia; Ondine; Samson; Strawberrybananaclub; Jo Yoon-kyung

Kiss of Life singles chronology
"Bad News" (2023)	"Midas Touch" (2024)	"Sticky" (2024)

Kiss of Life chronology
Born to Be XX (2023)	Midas Touch (2024)	Sticky (2024)

Music video
- "Midas Touch" on YouTube

"Midas Touch" is a song by South Korean girl group Kiss of Life. The song was released on April 3, 2024, along with their first single album also named Midas Touch.

== Background ==
On March 12, 2024, Kiss of Life released three motion teasers teasing new music. Three days later, S2 Entertainment announced that the group would release their first single album. On April 1, a teaser for the lead single's music video was released. The song and its music video was subsequently released on April 3. The final concept teaser, "We will choose love", was revealed on March 31.

== Composition ==
"Midas Touch" uses synthesizers reminiscent of music from the 2000s. Band member Julie described the lyrics of "Midas Touch" as being about love in its early stages.

== Music video ==
The music video for "Midas Touch" involves the band members using statues from Greek mythology as a recurring motif.

== Critical reception ==
Professional ratings
Review scores
Source	Rating
IZM	5/5 stars

Writing for IZM, So Seung-geun described "Midas Touch" as the group's most melodic and nostalgic song, incorporating 1970s disco and 1990s new jack swing.

Critics' year-end rankings of "Midas Touch"
Publication	List	Rank	Ref.
Consequence	200 Best Songs of 2024	145	
Idology	Best Music Videos of 2024	Placed	

== Single charts ==
=== Weekly charts ===
Weekly chart performance
Chart (2024)	Peak position
Global 200 (Billboard)	165
Japan Heatseekers (Billboard Japan)	12
Singapore (RIAS)	18
South Korea (Circle Digital Chart)	31

=== Monthly charts ===
Monthly chart performance
Chart (2024)	Position
South Korea (Circle)	188

=== Year-end charts ===
Year-end chart performance
Chart (2024)	Position
South Korea (Circle)	95

== Single album track listing ==
Midas Touch track listing
No.	Title	Lyrics	Music	Arrangement	Length
1.	"Midas Touch"	Mia; Ondine; Samson; Strawberrybananaclub; Jo Yoon-kyung	Ondine; Samson; Strawberrybananaclub	Strawberrybananaclub	2:42
2.	"Nothing"	Ayushy	Ayushy; P.K; AFTRSHOK	P.K	3:31
Total length:					6:14

== Album charts ==
=== Weekly ===
Weekly chart performance for Midas Touch
Chart (2024)	Peak position
South Korean Albums (Circle)	8

=== Monthly ===
Monthly chart performance for Midas Touch
Chart (2024)	Position
South Korean Albums (Circle)	19

== Release history ==
Release history
Region	Date	Format	Label
Various	April 3, 2024	Digital download; streaming	S2
