= Born to Be XX =

- Digital cover

EP by Kiss of Life
- Released: November 8, 2023
- Genres: Dance-pop; R&B; Philadelphia soul; hip-hop rock; pop; afro; reggae; ballad
- Length: 21:12
- Language: Korean
- Label: S2

Kiss of Life chronology
| Kiss of Life (2023) | Born to Be XX (2023) | Midas Touch (2024) |

Singles from Born to Be XX
- 1. "Bad News" Released: November 8, 2023; 2. "Nobody Knows" Released: November 8, 2023

Born to Be XX is the second extended play (EP) by South Korean girl group Kiss of Life. It was released on November 8, 2023, through S2 Entertainment. The EP contains seven tracks, including the lead singles "Bad News" and "Nobody Knows".

== Title ==
Speaking about the album's name, member Belle explained that the two X symbols in the album's name "signify two different concepts: special things that are not welcomed [by others] and the group's message to reject prejudice, misunderstandings and stereotypes."

== Background ==
On September 28, 2023, S2 Entertainment released a poster indicating that Kiss of Life would make their comeback in November. On October 13, 2023, the group revealed that they would make a comeback on November 8, 2023, by posting a teaser.

== Promotion ==
On October 16, 2023, a poster was released featuring the members mugshots with the caption 'Who's the villain'. On October 17, the group released the tracklist of the album. From October 19 to 25 the group released various concept photos. On October 27, a trailer for the EP was released. On October 30, the group released the sneak peek of the tracks.

== Composition ==
The lead single "Bad News" is a groovy mid-tempo that blends elements of pop, hip-hop, and rock, which makes this feel like the most natural evolution of the burgeoning band's sound, whereas "Nobody Knows" is a slick, upbeat slice of R&B influenced by the 1970s. "TTG" was described as a R&B track which is reminiscent of music from the 2000s, and "Gentleman" is a song which has a unique sound with an Afro rhythm, reggae patterns, and soul gospel. "Says It" is a track dedicated to fans written by member Belle, with lyrics that capture the emotions of unrequited love.

== Critical reception ==
Professional ratings
Review scores
| Source | Rating |
|---|---|
| NME | 3/5 stars |

Carmen Chin writing for NME described the extended play as "a diamond in the rough" and is a sophomore album, which certainly has some gigantic shoes to fill after their debut which exceeds all expectations.

=== Accolades ===
Awards and nominations for Born to be XX
| Organization | Year | Award | Result | Ref. |
|---|---|---|---|---|
| Korean Music Awards | 2024 | Best K-pop Album | Nominated | |

== Track listing ==
Born to Be XX track listing
| No. | Title | Lyrics | Music | Arrangement | Length |
|---|---|---|---|---|---|
| 1. | "Bad News" | Rick Bridges; Jonghan; PAPRIKAA; Strawberrybananaclub | Strawberrybananaclub; Jonghan; Rick Bridges | Strawberrybananaclub | 2:40 |
| 2. | "Nobody Knows" | Jo Yoon-kyung; Julie; Rick Bridges | PAPRIKAA; Im Jungwoo; Adora; VON MENTZER | PAPRIKAA | 3:15 |
| 3. | "My 808" | Mia (153/Joombas); Rick Bridges; Lee Hyeyum (Jamfactory); Gemma; Belle; Natty | G'harah "PK" Degeddingseze; Tricia Battani; TMM | G'harah "PK" Degeddingseze; Tricia Battani | 2:39 |
| 4. | "TTG" | Ondine; Rick Bridges; BYMORE | BYMORE; Ondine; Adora; Rick Bridges | BYMORE | 3:29 |
| 5. | "Gentleman" | Jo Yoon-kyung | Thomas Troelsen; Lindy Robbins; Gabe Saporta; Shy Carter | Troelsen | 2:58 |
| 6. | "Says It" | Belle; Rick Bridges | clovd (WSHL:ST); Kwon Deokgeun (WSHL:ST); Young Chance; Belle; Eunsol | clovd (WSHL:ST); Kwon Deokgeun (WSHL:ST) | 3:31 |
| 7. | "Bad News" (English version) | Julie; Rick Bridges; Jonghan; PAPRIKAA; Strawberrybananaclub | Strawberrybananaclub; Jonghan; Rick Bridges | Strawberrybananaclub | 2:40 |
| Total length: | | | | | 21:12 |

== Charts ==
=== Weekly charts ===
Weekly chart performance for Born to Be XX
| Chart (2023) | Peak position |
|---|---|
| South Korean Albums (Circle) | 49 |

=== Monthly charts ===
Monthly chart performance for Born to Be XX
| Chart (2023) | Position |
|---|---|
| South Korean Albums (Circle) | 36 |

== Release history ==
Release history and formats for Born to Be XX
| Region | Date | Format | Label |
|---|---|---|---|
| South Korea | November 8, 2023 | CD | S2 |
| Various | November 8, 2023 | Digital download; streaming | S2 |
