= Kiss of Life (group) =

South Korean girl group

- Kiss of Life in July 2024; From left to right: Belle, Natty, Julie, and Haneul

Background information
- Also known as: KIOF
- Origin: Seoul, South Korea
- Genres: K-pop; R&B; dance-pop
- Years active: 2023–present
- Labels: S2; Nippon Columbia
- Members: Julie; Natty; Belle; Haneul
- Website: kissoflife-official.com

Kiss of Life (Korean: 키스 오브 라이프; stylized in all caps), also known as KIOF, is a South Korean girl group formed by S2 Entertainment in 2023. The group consists of four members: Julie, Natty, Belle, and Haneul. They debuted on July 5, 2023, with the extended play (EP) Kiss of Life.

== Name ==
According to S2 Entertainment, the name signifies their ambition to "breathe a new life into the music industry with their music and charm." Reflecting on their name, the group's concepts revolve around the different stages of life, adolescence and young adulthood.

== History ==
=== 2015–2022: Pre-debut and formation ===
Belle is known as the daughter of the veteran Korean singer Shim Shin. She used to work for SM Entertainment as a songwriter. Natty was a contestant on the South Korean reality survival shows Sixteen and Idol School, that led to the formation of Twice and Fromis 9, respectively. In both shows, she made it to the final episode, but was ultimately not chosen for the final line-up of both groups. In 2020, she debuted as a soloist with the single album, Nineteen. Julie was a trainee under The Black Label, a sub-label of YG Entertainment from 2017 to 2020.

On July 12, 2022, Natty signed an exclusive contract with S2 Entertainment. In December 2022, Natty was featured in a British documentary about K-pop trainees along with Julie, Belle, and two other unknown trainees. It was speculated that they were the alleged members of the company's upcoming girl group. On December 27, S2 Entertainment announced they were preparing to launch a new girl group in 2023. Later in February 2023, it was discovered that the agency had applied to trademark Kiss of Life and that they had opened SNS accounts of the same name for the group.

=== 2023: Debut with Kiss of Life and Born to Be XX ===
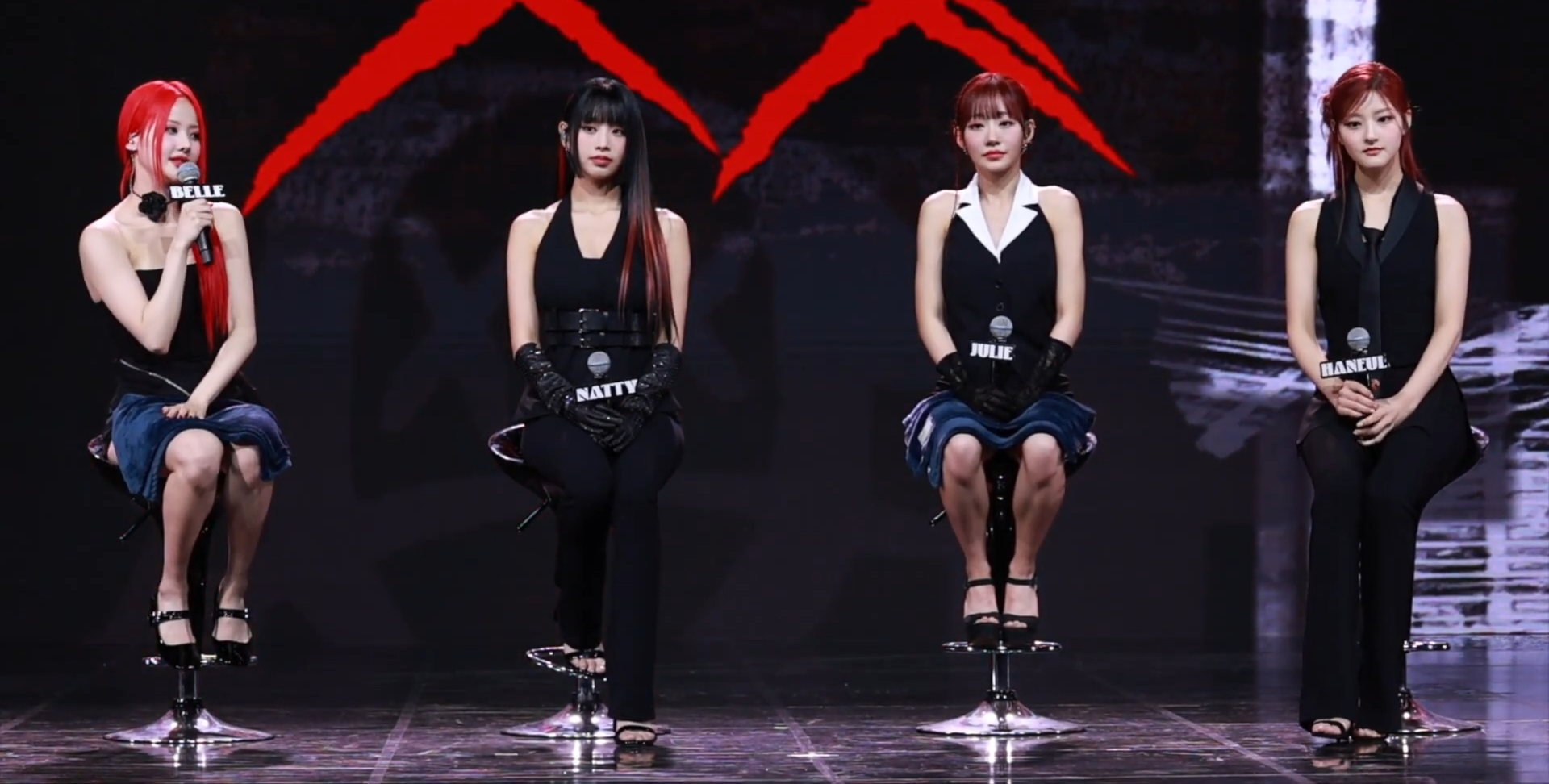
Kiss of Life at their showcase in November 2023

On May 12, 2023, S2 Entertainment released the first teaser of the group in their SNS accounts. This revealed that the group was hoped to be debuting on July of the same year. Natty was the first member to be revealed on May 15. This was followed with Belle, Julie, and Haneul in the next consecutive days. On May 26, Lee Hae-in was confirmed to be the creative director of the group. On June 12, another teaser was released, announcing the group's debut on July 5, with their self-titled EP.

Beginning with "Sugarcoat" by Natty on June 18, solo music videos of "Countdown" by Belle, "Kitty Cat" by Julie, and "Play Love Games" by Haneul were officially released in the following days. On June 27, the music video of a B-side of the EP "Bye My Neverland" was released, along with the music video teaser for the official debut single "Shhh" on July 3. On July 5, they officially debuted with the release of their EP and music video for "Shhh". They also held a press showcase at Yes24 Live Hall in Gwangjin District, Seoul on the afternoon of the same day.

On September 28, S2 Entertainment released a teaser announcing the release of the group's second EP, Born to Be XX on November. On October 13, another teaser was issued revealing the official date of release, which was November 8. The EP was released on the planned date, along with the music video for "Bad News", one of the lead singles. A week later, on November 15, the music video for the other lead single, "Nobody Knows", was released.

=== 2024: Midas Touch and Lose Yourself ===
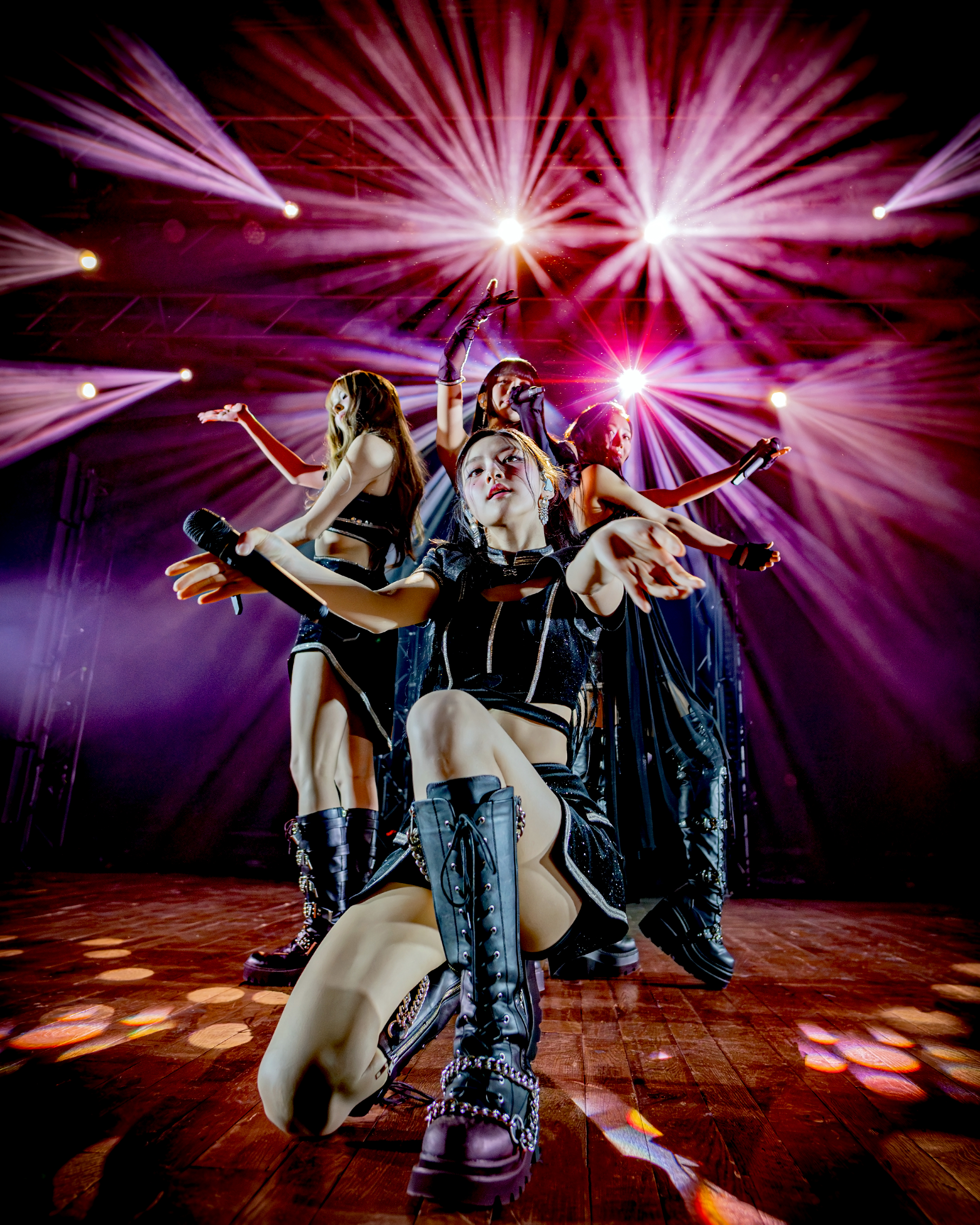
Kiss of Life in December 2024

On March 15, 2024, S2 Entertainment released a poster announcing the release of their single album titled Midas Touch, which was released on April 3. On June 21, it was announced that the group would be making a summer comeback with the digital single "Sticky" on July 1. On July 23, "Superpower" was released in collaboration with Riot Games, which served as the theme for the 2024 Valorant Champions tournament. Natty and Julie provide vocals along with Got7's Mark Tuan, and they performed the song live before the tournament's grand finals between Edward Gaming and Team Heretics at Seoul's Inspire Arena on August 25.

On August 26, S2 Entertainment and Kiss of Life announced Kiss Road, the group's first world tour, with shows in South Korea, the United States, and Canada taking place from October to December. On September 25, S2 Entertainment announced that Kiss of Life would be releasing their third EP Lose Yourself on October 15, with "Get Loud" as the title track. The pre-release single "R.E.M" was released on October 4. The Kiss Road tour started on October 26 and 27 at the Olympic Hall, which featured the unreleased song "W.House" in its set. A European leg of the tour was added for February and March 2025.

=== 2025–present: 224, Japanese debut, and Who Is She ===
On January 28, 2025, it was announced that the group would be performing at Sziget Festival in Budapest, making them the first K-pop group to perform at the event.

In April, Kiss of Life shared videos to celebrate Julie's birthday with the theme "old-school hip hop vibes". In a live broadcast, members wore gold chains, gold hoop earrings, snapback hats, and cornrows. Members gave themselves nicknames, including referring to Belle as "Lil Taco Belle". They mimicked African American Vernacular English and used exaggerated mannerisms "commonly associated with stereotypical portrayals of African American rappers". The videos were criticized as culturally insensitive and representing cultural appropriation. The videos were deleted and the members of the group issued apologies. Following the controversy, the group lost about 200,000 followers on Instagram, going from 3.7 million followers to 3.5 million followers. The group later withdrew from a planned performance at KCON in Los Angeles, citing a mutual decision between the group's agency and the event promoter. In a statement released in June, S2 Entertainment reiterated their apologies for the video and stated they would "take all necessary legal actions" regarding death threats, misinformation, sexual harassment, and deepfakes against the group.

On May 7, Kiss of Life released a special digital single "Kiss Road", with the lead track "Live, Love, Laugh". On May 19, it was announced that the group would be releasing their fourth EP 224 on June 9. On November 5, Kiss of Life made their Japanese debut with the EP Tokyo Mission Start, which is supported by their first original Japanese song "Lucky", and the Japanese version of their single "Sticky".

In 2026, Kiss of Life embarked on their Déjà Vu fan meeting tour in Asia. On April 6, Kiss of Life released Who Is She, their second single album. Their third single album Sweat was released on August 4.

== Artistry ==
=== Influences ===
Julie stated in an interview that the group has been greatly influenced by the music of Blackpink, 2NE1, and BigBang. The members additionally mentioned that they listen to a lot of R&B and hip-hop music, being strongly influenced by artists such as Ariana Grande, SZA, Rihanna, and Rosalía as well. Individually, Julie cited Blackpink and 2NE1 as her role models, Natty cited BoA and Yerin Baek as her role models, Belle cited Sabrina Carpenter as a musical inspiration, and Haneul cited Olivia Rodrigo as her role model.

== Endorsements ==
In February 2024, Maybelline New York announced that it selected Kiss of Life as its new brand ambassador.

In March 2025, Kiss of Life collaborated with the global hair treatment brand Fino for its 2025 campaign "Glow Up with Fino".

== Members ==
- Julie (쥴리) – leader
- Natty (나띠)
- Belle (벨)
- Haneul (하늘)

== Discography ==
=== Extended plays ===
==== Korean EPs ====
List of Korean EPs, showing selected details, selected chart positions, and sales figures
Title	Details	Peak chart positions			Sales
Title	Details	KOR	JPN	JPN Hot	Sales
Kiss of Life	Released: July 5, 2023; Label: S2; Formats: CD, digital download, streaming	18	—	—	KOR: 25,665
Born to Be XX	Released: November 8, 2023; Label: S2; Formats: CD, digital download, streaming	12	—	—	KOR: 59,092
Lose Yourself	Released: October 15, 2024; Label: S2; Formats: CD, digital download, streaming	6	25	—	KOR: 120,259; JPN: 2,380
224	Released: June 9, 2025; Label: S2; Formats: CD, digital download, streaming	6	—	81	KOR: 102,519
"—" denotes releases that did not chart or were not released in that region.

==== Japanese EPs ====
List of Japanese EPs, showing selected details, selected chart positions, and sales figures
Title	Details	Peak chart positions	Sales
Title	Details	JPN	Sales
Tokyo Mission Start	Released: November 5, 2025; Label: S2, Nippon Columbia; Formats: CD, digital download, streaming; Track listing: 1. "Lucky"; 2. "Sticky" (Japanese version); 3. "Midas Touch" (Japanese version); 4. "Shhh" (Japanese version); 5. "Nobody Knows" (remix); 6. "R.E.M" (remix)	15	JPN: 5,422
Sweat -Japanese EP-	Released: September 16, 2026; Label: S2, Nippon Columbia; Formats: CD, digital download, streaming; Track listing: 1. "Sweat" (Japanese Ver.); 2. "Was It You"; 3. "Break It"; 4. "Who Is She" (Japanese Ver.); 5. "Igloo" (Remix); 6. "Break It" (English Ver.)	22	JPN: 3,152

=== Single albums ===
List of single albums, showing selected details, selected chart positions and sales
Title	Details	Peak chart positions	Sales
Title	Details	KOR	Sales
Midas Touch	Released: April 3, 2024; Label: S2; Formats: CD, digital download, streaming	8	KOR: 100,607
Who Is She	Released: April 6, 2026; Label: S2; Formats: CD, digital download, streaming; Track listing: 1. "Who Is She"; 2. "Don't Mind Me"	4	KOR: 72,173
Sweat	Released: August 4, 2026; Label: S2; Formats: CD, digital download, streaming; Track listing: 1. "Sweat"; 2. "What!"	11	KOR: 56,477

=== Singles ===
==== Korean singles ====
List of singles, showing year released, chart positions, and album name
Title	Year	Peak chart positions									Album
Title	Year	KOR	KOR Songs	JPN Heat.	NZ Hot	PHL	SGP	TWN	US World	WW	Album
"Shhh" (쉿)	2023	173	—	—	—	—	—	—	—	—	Kiss of Life
"Bad News"	2023	101	—	—	—	—	—	—	—	—	Born to Be XX
"Nobody Knows"	2023	130	—	—	—	—	—	—	—	—	Born to Be XX
"Midas Touch"	2024	31	—	12	23	—	18	—	—	165	Midas Touch
"Sticky"	2024	3	7	1	35	96	17	17	10	87	Non-album single
"R.E.M"	2024	185	—	—	28	—	—	—	—	—	Lose Yourself
"Get Loud"	2024	106	—	—	—	—	—	—	—	—	Lose Yourself
"Live, Love, Laugh" (Note: Released as part of the special digital single "Kiss Road".)	2025	— (Note: "Live, Love, Laugh" did not enter the Circle Digital Chart, but peaked at number 26 on the Circle Download Chart.)	—	—	—	—	—	—	—	—	Non-album single
"Lips Hips Kiss"	2025	88	—	—	—	—	—	—	—	—	224
"Who Is She"	2026	100	—	—	—	—	—	21	6	—	Who Is She
"Sweat"	2026	185	—	—	—	—	—	—	—	—	Sweat
"—" denotes releases that did not chart or were not released in that region.

==== Japanese singles ====
List of Japanese singles, showing year released, and album name
Title	Year	Album
"Sticky" (Japanese version)	2025	Tokyo Mission Start
"Lucky"	2025	Tokyo Mission Start

=== Other charted songs ===
List of other charted songs, showing year released, chart positions, and album name
Title	Year	Peak chart positions					Album
Title	Year	KOR	MLY	NZ Hot	SGP	WW	Album
"Bye My Neverland" (안녕,네버랜드)	2023	— (Note: "Bye My Neverland" did not enter the Circle Digital Chart, but peaked at number 155 on the Circle Download Chart.)	—	—	—	—	Kiss of Life
"Sugarcoat" (Natty solo)	2023	83	—	—	—	—	Kiss of Life
"Countdown" (Belle solo)	2023	— (Note: "Countdown" did not enter the Circle Digital Chart, but peaked at number 199 on the Circle Download Chart.)	—	—	—	—	Kiss of Life
"Says It"	2023	— (Note: "Says It" did not enter the Circle Digital Chart, but peaked at number 178 on the Circle Download Chart.)	—	—	—	—	Born to Be XX
"TTG"	2023	— (Note: "TTG" did not enter the Circle Digital Chart, but peaked at number 184 on the Circle Download Chart.)	—	—	—	—	Born to Be XX
"My 808"	2023	— (Note: "My 808" did not enter the Circle Digital Chart, but peaked at number 195 on the Circle Download Chart.)	—	—	—	—	Born to Be XX
"Gentleman"	2023	— (Note: "Gentleman" did not enter the Circle Digital Chart, but peaked at number 200 on the Circle Download Chart.)	—	—	—	—	Born to Be XX
"Nothing"	2024	— (Note: "Nothing" did not enter the Circle Digital Chart, but peaked at number 54 on the Circle Download Chart.)	—	—	—	—	Midas Touch
"Te Quiero"	2024	— (Note: "Te Quiero" did not enter the Circle Digital Chart, but peaked at number 46 on the Circle Download Chart.)	—	—	—	—	Sticky
"Chemistry"	2024	— (Note: "Chemistry" did not enter the Circle Digital Chart, but peaked at number 71 on the Circle Download Chart.)	—	—	—	—	Lose Yourself
"Igloo"	2024	26	21	40	18	199	Lose Yourself
"Too Many Alex"	2024	— (Note: "Too Many Alex" did not enter the Circle Digital Chart, but peaked at number 72 on the Circle Download Chart.)	—	—	—	—	Lose Yourself
"Back to Me"	2024	— (Note: "Back to Me" did not enter the Circle Digital Chart, but peaked at number 59 on the Circle Download Chart.)	—	—	—	—	Lose Yourself
"No One but Us"	2024	— (Note: "No One but Us" did not enter the Circle Digital Chart, but peaked at number 64 on the Circle Download Chart.)	—	—	—	—	Lose Yourself
"W.House"	2025	— (Note: "W.House" did not enter the Circle Digital Chart, but peaked at number 90 on the Circle Download Chart.)	—	—	—	—	Non-album song
"Tell Me"	2025	— (Note: "Tell Me" did not enter the Circle Digital Chart, but peaked at number 43 on the Circle Download Chart.)	—	—	—	—	224
"K Bye"	2025	— (Note: "K Bye" did not enter the Circle Digital Chart, but peaked at number 56 on the Circle Download Chart.)	—	—	—	—	224
"Painting"	2025	— (Note: "Painting" did not enter the Circle Digital Chart, but peaked at number 55 on the Circle Download Chart.)	—	—	—	—	224
"Slide"	2025	— (Note: "Slide" did not enter the Circle Digital Chart, but peaked at number 50 on the Circle Download Chart.)	—	—	—	—	224
"Heart of Gold"	2025	— (Note: "Heart of Gold" did not enter the Circle Digital Chart, but peaked at number 64 on the Circle Download Chart.)	—	—	—	—	224
"Think Twice"	2025	— (Note: "Think Twice" did not enter the Circle Digital Chart, but peaked at number 61 on the Circle Download Chart.)	—	—	—	—	224
"Don't Mind Me"	2026	— (Note: "Don't Mind Me" did not enter the Circle Digital Chart, but peaked at number 57 on the Circle Download Chart.)	—	—	—	—	Who Is She
"What!"	2026	— (Note: "What!" did not enter the Circle Digital Chart, but peaked at number 44 on the Circle Download Chart.)	—	—	—	—	Sweat
"—" denotes releases that did not chart or were not released in that region.

=== Soundtrack appearances ===
List of soundtrack appearances, showing year released, chart positions, and album name
Title	Year	Peak chart positions	Album
Title	Year	KOR Down.	Album
"Sixth Sense"	2024	—	Non-album singles
"Superpower" (Julie and Natty with Mark Tuan)	2024	139	Non-album singles
"Maestro of My Heart"	2024	74	Stage Fighter (STF) Original, Vol. 1
"—" denotes releases that did not chart or were not released in that region.

== Videography ==
=== Music videos ===
Title	Year	Director(s)	Length	Ref.
"Sugarcoat (Natty Solo)"	2023	Shin Hee-won (ST-WT)	3:53	
"Countdown (Belle Solo)"	2023	Shin Hee-won (ST-WT)	3:27	
"Kitty Cat (Julie Solo)"	2023	Shin Hee-won (ST-WT)	3:14	
"Play Love Games (Haneul Solo)"	2023	Shin Hee-won (ST-WT)	3:02	
"Bye My Neverland"	2023	Shin Hee-won (ST-WT)	4:06	
"Shhh"	2023	Shin Hee-won (ST-WT)	5:46	
"Bad News"	2023	Shin Hee-won (ST-WT)	3:08	
"Nobody Knows"	2023	Shin Hee-won (ST-WT)	4:35	
"Midas Touch"	2024	Digipedi	2:50	
"Sticky"	2024	Shin Hee-won (ST-WT)	3:11	
"R.E.M"	2024	Choi Yongseok (Lumpens)	3:13	
"Get Loud"	2024	Choi Yongseok (Lumpens)	3:04	
"Live, Love, Laugh"	2025	725 (SL8)	3:49	
"Lips Hips Kiss"	2025	Christian Haahs	3:37	
"Lucky"	2025	Hasegawa Anderson (Digipedi)	3:22	
"Who Is She"	2026	Christian Haahs (NOVA)	2:41	
"Sweat"	2026	Unknown	2:59	

=== Special videos ===
Title	Year	Director(s)	Length	Ref.
"Painting"	2025	Unknown	2:59	
"k bye"	2025	Unknown	2:26	
"Don't mind me"	2026	Unknown	3:03	
"What!"	2026	Unknown	3:05	

== Concert tours ==
- Kiss Road World Tour (2024–25)

== Accolades ==
=== Awards and nominations ===
Name of the award ceremony, year presented, award category, nominee(s) and the result of the award
Award ceremony	Year	Category	Nominee/work	Result	Ref.
Asia Artist Awards	2024	Best Artist Award – Music	Kiss of Life	Won	
Asia Artist Awards	2024	Best Musician Award	Kiss of Life	Won	
Asia Artist Awards	2025	Best Musician – Group	Kiss of Life	Won	
Asia Artist Awards	2026	Popularity Award – Group (Female)	Kiss of Life	Pending	
Asian Pop Music Awards	2023	Best New Artist (Overseas)	Kiss of Life	Nominated	
Brand of the Year Awards	2024	Rising Star Award (Female Idol)	Kiss of Life	Won	
Circle Chart Music Awards	2023	Rookie of the Year (Global Streaming)	"Shhh"	Nominated	
Circle Chart Music Awards	2023	New Artist of the Next Generation	Kiss of Life	Won	
D Awards	2025	Best Popularity Award — Girl Group	Kiss of Life	Nominated	
The Fact Music Awards	2024	Global Hot-Trend	Kiss of Life	Won	
Golden Disc Awards	2025	Best Digital Song (Bonsang)	"Sticky"	Nominated	
Golden Disc Awards	2025	Most Popular Artist – Female	Kiss of Life	Nominated	
Golden Disc Awards	2025	Next Generation	Kiss of Life	Won	
Hanteo Music Awards	2023	Global Rising Artist	Kiss of Life	Won	
Hanteo Music Awards	2023	Rookie of the Year – Female	Kiss of Life	Nominated	
Hanteo Music Awards	2024	WhosFandom Award – Female	Kiss of Life	Nominated	
Hanteo Music Awards	2024	Artist of the Year (Bonsang)	Kiss of Life	Nominated	
Hanteo Music Awards	2024	Global Artist – Africa	Kiss of Life	Nominated	
Hanteo Music Awards	2024	Global Artist – Asia	Kiss of Life	Nominated	
Hanteo Music Awards	2024	Global Artist – Europe	Kiss of Life	Nominated	
Hanteo Music Awards	2024	Global Artist – North America	Kiss of Life	Nominated	
Hanteo Music Awards	2024	Global Artist – Oceania	Kiss of Life	Nominated	
Hanteo Music Awards	2024	Global Artist – South America	Kiss of Life	Nominated	
iHeartRadio Music Awards	2025	Favorite K-pop Dance Challenge	"Sticky"	Nominated	
K-World Dream Awards	2024	Bonsang	Kiss of Life	Won	
Korea Culture and Entertainment Awards	2023	Best New Artist Award	Kiss of Life	Won	
Korea First Brand Awards (Note: The Korea First Brand Awards is hosted by the Korea Consumer Brand Committee and the Korea Consumer Forum. Awards are based on a nationwide survey held in South Korea.)	2024	Rookie Female Idol	Kiss of Life	Won	
Korea Grand Music Awards	2024	Fan Vote Rookie – Female	Kiss of Life	Nominated	
Korean Music Awards	2024	Rookie of the Year	Kiss of Life	Won	
Korean Music Awards	2024	Best K-pop Album	Born to Be XX	Nominated	
Korean Wave Awards	2023	K-Pop Rising Star	Kiss of Life	Won	
MAMA Awards	2023	Album of the Year	Kiss of Life	Nominated	
MAMA Awards	2023	Artist of the Year	Kiss of Life	Nominated	
MAMA Awards	2023	Best New Female Artist	Kiss of Life	Nominated	
MAMA Awards	2024	Worldwide Fans' Choice Top 10	Kiss of Life	Nominated	
Melon Music Awards	2023	Rookie of the Year	Kiss of Life	Nominated	
Melon Music Awards	2023	1theK Global Icon	Kiss of Life	Won	
Melon Music Awards	2024	Top 10 Artist	Kiss of Life	Nominated	
Newsis K-Expo Cultural Awards	2026	Seoul Metropolitan Council Chairperson's Award	Kiss of Life	Won	
Seoul Music Awards	2024	New Wave Star	Kiss of Life	Won	
Seoul Music Awards	2024	Rookie of the Year	Kiss of Life	Nominated	
Seoul Music Awards	2025	Main Prize (Bonsang)	Kiss of Life	Nominated	
Seoul Music Awards	2025	Popularity Award	Kiss of Life	Nominated	
Seoul Music Awards	2025	K-Wave Special Award	Kiss of Life	Nominated	
Seoul Music Awards	2025	K-pop World Choice – Group	Kiss of Life	Nominated	
Seoul Music Awards	2025	Ballad Award	Kiss of Life	Nominated	

=== Listicles ===
Name of publisher, year listed, name of listicle, and placement
Publisher	Year	Listicle	Placement	Ref.
Teen Vogue	2024	12 Girl Groups to Watch in 2024	Placed	
