= Get Loud (song) =

Single by Kiss of Life

from the EP Lose Yourself
- Released: October 15, 2024
- Genre: Pop; hip-hop; rock
- Length: 2:49
- Label: S2
- Composers: Strawberrybananaclub; Jackson; Belle
- Lyricists: Belle; Ondine; Strawberrybananaclub; Taneisha Jackson; Jinsol

Kiss of Life singles chronology
"R.E.M" (2025)	"Get Loud" (2024)	"Live, Love, Laugh" (2025)

Music video
- "Get Loud" on YouTube

"Get Loud" is a song by South Korean girl group Kiss of Life, released on October 15, 2024, as the lead single from their third extended play (EP), Lose Yourself. It was released by S2 Entertainment.

== Background and release ==
On September 25, 2024, Kiss of Life announced their third extended play, Lose Yourself, scheduled for release on October 15. The group also revealed that a pre-release single would be released on October 4.

== Composition ==
"Get Loud" is a hip hop track that incorporates Latin-inspired melodies and elements of pop and rock. The lyrics promote individuality and self-expression, encouraging listeners to pursue their passions. In an interview with The Hollywood Reporter, member Belle explained that the song is about embracing uniqueness and continuing to do what one enjoys, even if it may seem unconventional.

== Music video ==
The music video for "Get Loud" features scenes of the group performing in various settings, including a high-end restaurant and a stage where they engage in a choreographed dance sequence against themselves. The chorus includes the lyrics, "Get loud / The bass is getting louder, I'm ready / Baby come and give it to me."

== Promotion ==
Kiss of Life began promotional activities for "Get Loud" with a performance on Mnet's M Countdown on October 17, 2024.

== Accolades ==
Music program awards for "Get Loud"
Program	Date	Ref.
The Show	October 29, 2024	

== Charts ==
Chart performance for "Get Loud"
Chart (2024)	Peak position
South Korea (Circle)	106

== Release history ==
Release history for "Get Loud"
Region	Date	Format	Label
Various	October 15, 2024	Digital download; streaming	S2
