= Natty (Thai singer) =

Thai singer (born 2002)

Natty นัตตี้
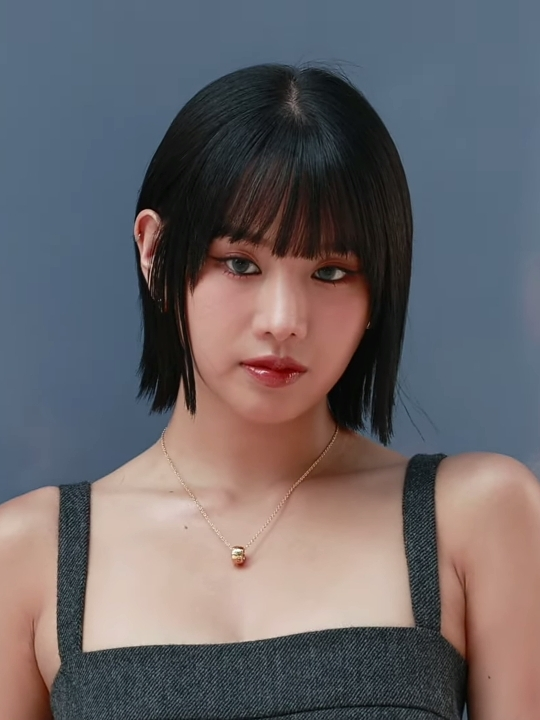
- Natty in September 2024

Background information
- Born: Anatchaya Suputhipong; May 30, 2002 (age 24); Bangkok, Thailand
- Origin: South Korea
- Genres: K-pop; R&B; Hip hop
- Occupation: Singer
- Instrument: Vocals
- Years active: 2015–present
- Labels: Swing; S2
- Member of: Kiss of Life

YouTube information
- Channel: Official NT
- Genre: Music
- Subscribers: 119 thousand
- Views: 11.3 million
- Last updated: August 4, 2026

Anatchaya Suputhipong (Thai: อาณัชญา สุพุทธิพงศ์, RTGS: Anatchaya Suphuthiphong; born May 30, 2002), known professionally as Natty (Korean: 나띠; Thai: นัตตี้), is a Thai singer based in South Korea. She is a member of the South Korean girl group Kiss of Life which debuted under S2 Entertainment on July 5, 2023. She was previously a contestant on Mnet's girl group survival programs Sixteen (2015) and Idol School (2017) before debuting as a soloist on May 7, 2020, with the release of her solo single album Nineteen.

== Career ==
=== 2015–2017: Sixteen, Idol School and departure from JYP ===
In May 2015, Natty participated in the Mnet reality survival program Sixteen where she was pitted against 15 other trainees from JYP Entertainment to secure a spot in the label's next girl group after Miss A and Wonder Girls, later revealed to be named Twice. However, she was eliminated in the final round, thus continuing as a trainee under the label.

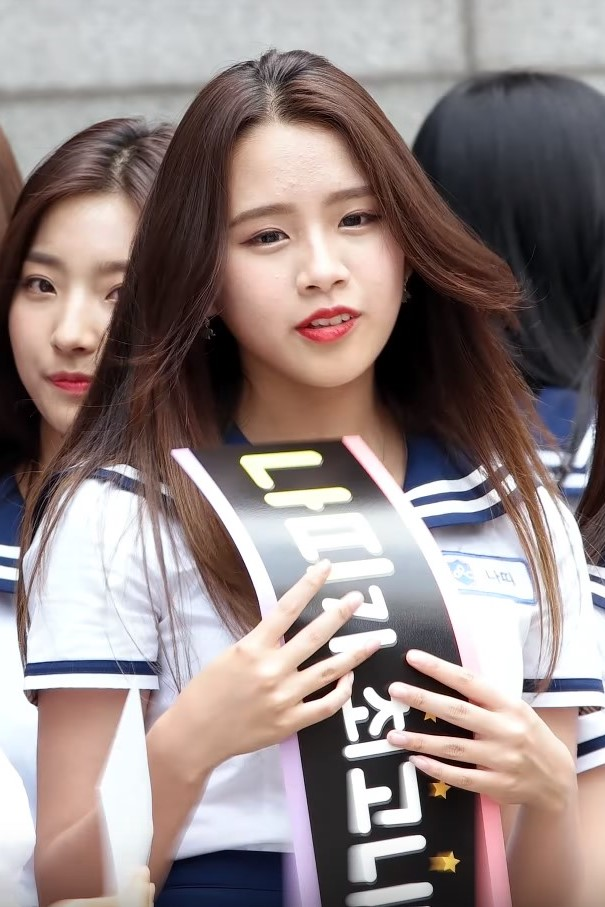
Natty on Idol School in July 2017

In July 2017, Natty participated in the Mnet reality survival program Idol School to compete with 40 other contestants for an opportunity to debut in a 9-member girl group, later revealed to be named Fromis 9. However, she was eliminated from the potential debut group in which she ranked 13th in the final episode.

=== 2020: Solo debut and activities ===
On April 6, 2020, Natty signed with Swing Entertainment. Her debut single Nineteen was released on May 7, along with its accompanying music video. She made her first music show appearance as a solo artist on KBS' Music Bank on May 8.

Natty returned with her second single album Teddy Bear on November 12, 2020. In her music video for the album's titular song, she showed the crest of New College, Oxford.

=== 2022–present: Debut with Kiss of Life ===
On July 12, 2022, Natty signed with S2 Entertainment.

On May 12, 2023, S2 Entertainment announced that Natty would re-debut in a new 4-member girl group called Kiss of Life, which planned to debut in July. On July 5, the group officially made their debut with the release of their self-titled EP.

On May 28, 2024, Natty featured in Jay Park's single "Taxi Blurr". On August 13, Natty and Kiss of Life fellow member Julie was cast in the Mnet web series My Arti Film. On November 6, it was announced that Natty would be taking over BamBam's talk show, Bam's House, which will be rebranded as Tty House.

== Discography ==
=== Single albums ===
| Title | Details | Peak chart positions | Sales |
| Title | Details | KOR | Sales |
|---|---|---|---|
| Nineteen | Released: May 7, 2020; Label: Swing Entertainment; Formats: CD, digital download | 58 | KOR: 1,101 |

=== Singles ===
| Title | Year | Peak chart positions | Album |
| Title | Year | KOR | Album |
As lead artist
| "Nineteen" | 2020 | — | Nineteen |
| "Teddy Bear" | 2020 | — | Non-album single |
As featured artist
| "Live or Die" (Marco 619 featuring Natty) | 2023 | — | Non-album singles |
| "Dusk Twilight (밤이 되니까)" (Adora featuring Natty) | 2024 | — | Non-album singles |
| "Taxi Blurr" (Jay Park featuring Natty) | 2024 | 199 | Non-album singles |
Other charted songs
| "Sugarcoat (Natty solo)" | 2023 | 83 | Kiss of Life |
"—" denotes releases that did not chart or were not released in that region.

=== Songwriting credits ===
All song credits are adapted from the Korea Music Copyright Association's database unless stated otherwise.

List of songs, showing year released, artist name, and name of the album
| Title | Year | Artist | Album | Lyricist | Composer | Ref. |
|---|---|---|---|---|---|---|
| "Shhh (쉿)" | 2023 | Kiss Of Life | Kiss Of Life | No | Yes | |
| "My 808" | 2023 | Kiss Of Life | Born To Be XX | Yes | No | |
| "Tell Me" | 2025 | Kiss Of Life | 224 | Yes | No | |
| "Painting" | 2025 | Kiss Of Life | 224 | Yes | No | |

== Filmography ==
=== Television shows ===
| Year | Title | Role | Notes | Ref. |
|---|---|---|---|---|
| 2015 | Sixteen | Contestant | Eliminated in the final round | |
| 2017 | Idol School | Contestant | Finished 13th | |

=== Web series ===
| Year | Title | Role | Notes | Ref. |
|---|---|---|---|---|
| 2024 | My Arti Film | Herself | Episode: "Buttons" | |

=== Web shows ===
| Year | Title | Role | Notes | Ref. |
|---|---|---|---|---|
| 2024 | Tty House | Host | formerly Bam's House | |

== Awards and nominations ==
Name of the award ceremony, year presented, award category, nominated work and the result of the nomination
| Award Ceremony | Year | Category | Nominated Work | Result | Ref. |
|---|---|---|---|---|---|
| Asian Pop Music Awards (Note: Hosted by the Hong Kong Asia Pacific International Group and Sunway Records, the Asian Pop Music Awards bases its winners on the "Asian Pop Music Chart" which opened in September 2019.) | 2020 | Best New Artist (Overseas) | "Nineteen" | Nominated | |
| Mnet Asian Music Awards | 2020 | Best New Female Artist | Herself | Nominated | |
| Mnet Asian Music Awards | 2020 | Artist of the Year | Herself | Nominated | |
| Mnet Asian Music Awards | 2020 | Worldwide Icon of the Year | Herself | Nominated | |
| Seoul Music Awards | 2021 | Rookie of the Year | Herself | Nominated | |
| Seoul Music Awards | 2021 | K-wave Popularity Award | Herself | Nominated | |
| Seoul Music Awards | 2021 | Popularity Award | Herself | Nominated | |
