= Shhh (Kiss of Life song) =

Single by Kiss of Life

from the EP Kiss of Life
- Language: Korean
- Released: July 5, 2023
- Length: 3:02
- Label: S2
- Composers: Strawberrybananaclub; Rick Bridges; Belle; Natty
- Lyricists: Strawberrybananaclub; Rick Bridges; Belle; Julie

Kiss of Life singles chronology
"Shhh" (2023)	"Bad News" (2023)

Music video
- "Shhh" on YouTube

"Shhh" (Korean: 쉿; RR: Swit) is a song by South Korean girl group Kiss of Life from their self-titled debut extended play (EP). It was released as the EP's lead single by S2 Entertainment on July 5, 2023.

== Background and release ==
On July 12, 2022, Natty signed an exclusive contract with S2 Entertainment. On December 27, 2022, S2 announced they were preparing to launch a new girl group in 2023.

On June 12, 2023, a teaser was released, announcing the group's debut on July 5 with their first self titled EP. S2 released concept photos of Belle and Natty on June 29 and Julie and Haneul on June 30.

On July 4, the music video teaser was released.

== Music video ==
"Shhh" continues the storyline from "Bye My Neverland", which had been released in the lead up for the EP. The music video ended with the members being involved in a car accident, and the "Shhh" music video covers Belle and Julie helping Natty tend to her wounds and then rescuing Haneul from a "persistent admirer", completing the four-piece group.

== Composition ==
"Shhh" was written by Strawberrybananaclub, Rick Bridges, Belle, and Natty, and composed by Strawberrybananaclub, Rick Bridges, Belle, and Julie. The song has been described as a song that informs the public of the identity of the artist pursuing freedom by showing the appearance of themself unbound by others. It has also been described as a blend of impressive posteriority, hip-hop, and dance genres that displays the charm of members who express their personality.

== Commercial performance ==
"Shhh" debuted at number 173 on the Circle Digital Chart for the chart issue dated August 27 – September 2, 2023.

== Promotion ==
Kiss of Life performed "Shhh" on four music programs: MBC M's Show Champion on July 6, Mnet's M Countdown on July 7, KBS's Music Bank on July 8, and SBS's Inkigayo on July 9.

== Accolades ==
Awards and nominations for "Shhh"
Award ceremony	Year	Category	Result	Ref.
Circle Chart Music Awards	2024	Rookie of the Year – Global Streaming	Nominated	

== Charts ==
Chart performance for "Shhh"
Chart (2023)	Peak position
South Korea (Circle)	173

== Release history ==
Release history for "Shhh"
Region	Date	Format	Label
Various	July 5, 2023	Digital download; streaming	S2
