= Sticky (Kiss of Life song) =

Single by Kiss of Life
- Language: Korean
- B-side: "Te Quiero"
- Released: July 1, 2024
- Genre: Afrobeat
- Length: 2:37
- Label: S2
- Composers: Jinsol; Strawberrybananaclub; Ayushy (The Hub); Joh!
- Lyricists: Mia (153/Joombas); Joh!; Gemma

Kiss of Life singles chronology
"Midas Touch" (2024)	"Sticky" (2024)	"R.E.M" (2024)

Kiss of Life chronology
Midas Touch (2024)	Sticky (2024)	Lose Yourself (2024)

Music video
- "Sticky" on YouTube

"Sticky" is a song by South Korean girl group Kiss of Life. It was released as a digital single by S2 Entertainment on July 1, 2024, and includes the B-side track "Te Quiero".

== Background and release ==
After the success of Kiss of Life's previous single "Midas Touch" from the single album of the same name, on June 21, 2024, it was announced that the group would be making a summer comeback with the digital single "Sticky" on July 1 later that year. On June 24, a teaser featuring a portion of the song was released. Concept photos were released on the subsequent day. On June 27, a teaser for the single's music video was released. On July 1, the single was released on all the digital platforms alongside its music video.

=== Japanese version ===
On October 15, 2025, Kiss of Life released the Japanese version of "Sticky", serving as a pre-release for their Japanese debut extended play, Tokyo Mission Start.

== Music ==
"Sticky" features an Afrobeat rhythm and sound, while the B-side track "Te Quiero" is described as a Latin-style song. This is in contrast to Kiss of Life's previous hip-hop and retro-inspired releases. Member Julie described the concept of "Sticky" as "refreshing" and "about (the group) being brighter and happy", which is unlike the "strong and intense image based on hip-hop sounds" that they are known for.

== Music video ==
The music video for "Sticky," edited as a one-shot music video, follows the group around a park and a nearby movie theatre as they sing and dance to the song.

== Listicles ==
Name of publisher, year listed, name of listicle, and placement
Publisher	Year	Listicle	Placement	Ref.
Billboard	2024	The 25 Best K-Pop Songs of 2024: Critic's Picks	11	
Idology	2024	Best Music Videos of 2024	Placed	
NME	2024	The 25 best K-pop songs of 2024	4	
NME	2024	NME's 50 Best Songs of 2024	46	

== Track listing ==
"Sticky" track listing
No.	Title	Lyrics	Music	Arrangement	Length
1.	"Sticky"	Mia (153/Joombas); Joh!; Gemma	Jinsol; Strawberrybananaclub; Ayushy (The Hub); Joh!	Jinsol; Strawberrybananaclub	2:37
2.	"Te Quiero"	Frankie Day (The Hub); Belle; Jinsol; Ondine; Gemma	Jinsol; Belle; Frankie Day (The Hub)	Jinsol	3:09
Total length:					5:46

== Accolades ==
Music program awards for "Sticky"
Program	Date	Ref.
Show Champion	July 17, 2024	
The Show	July 9, 2024	

== Charts ==
=== Weekly charts ===
Weekly chart performance
Chart (2024)	Peak position
Global 200 (Billboard)	87
Japan Heatseekers (Billboard Japan)	1
Japan Streaming (Billboard Japan)	80
Philippines (Philippines Hot 100)	96
Singapore (RIAS)	17
South Korea (Circle)	3
Taiwan (Billboard)	17
US World Digital Song Sales (Billboard)	10

=== Monthly charts ===
Monthly chart performance
Chart (2024)	Position
South Korea (Circle)	4

=== Year-end charts ===
Year-end chart performance
Chart	Year	Position
South Korea (Circle)	2024	51
South Korea (Circle)	2025	75

== Release history ==
Release history and formats for "Sticky"
Region	Date	Format	Version	Label
Various	July 1, 2024	Digital download; streaming	Original	S2
Various	October 15, 2025	Digital download; streaming	Japanese	S2; Nippon Columbia
