= Belle (singer) =

American singer (born 2004)

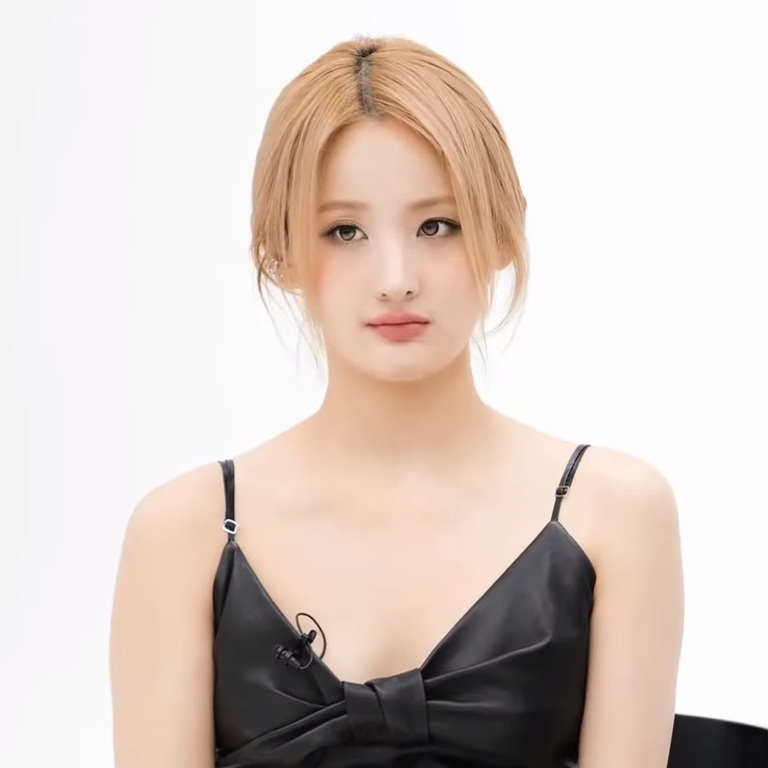
- Belle in September 2024
- Born: Shim Hye-won; March 20, 2004 (age 22); Seattle, Washington, U.S.
- Other name: Annabelle Shim
- Occupation: Singer
- Years active: 2023–present
- Relatives: Shim Shin (father)
- Musical career
- Genres: K-pop; R&B
- Instrument: Vocals
- Label: S2
- Member of: Kiss of Life

Korean name
- Hangul: 심혜원
- RR: Sim Hyewon
- MR: Sim Hyewŏn

Shim Hye-won (Korean: 심혜원; born March 20, 2004), better known by her stage name Belle (벨), is an American singer. She is a member of the South Korean girl group Kiss of Life.

== Early life ==
Belle was born on March 20, 2004, as Shim Hye-won, in Seattle, Washington. Her family consists of her father Shim Shin, a prominent singer in South Korea during the 1990s, her mother, and an older brother.

== Career ==
=== Pre-debut ===
As a child, Belle made a few television appearances alongside her father, including SBS' Global Junior Show in 2012.

From the age of 17, she began composing her own music which she uploaded on SoundCloud and Instagram. She joined SM Entertainment's Song Camp and later worked as a songwriter, taking part in composing and writing songs for artists such as Le Sserafim, Purple Kiss, and Miyeon. She is also credited for the background vocals of songs such as Le Sserafim's "Unforgiven" and Mark's "Child".

=== 2023–present: Debut with Kiss of Life ===
On May 16, 2023, S2 Entertainment announced that Belle would debut in a new 4-member girl group called Kiss of Life, which planned to debut in July. On July 5, the group officially made their debut with the release of their self-titled EP which included a solo song "Countdown" sung by Belle. On July 14, she received the "Proud Korean Grand Prize" composer award at the 2023 Korea Best Brand Awards.

On June 19, 2024, "See the Light", the original soundtrack for My Sweet Mobster which was sung by Belle, was released.

== Discography ==
=== Singles ===
==== As a featured artist ====
List of singles as a featured artist, showing year released, and name of the album
Title	Year	Album
"Twilight" (dress featuring Belle and Big Naughty)	2024	CMYK

=== Soundtrack appearances ===
List of soundtrack appearances, showing year released, chart positions, and name of the album
Title	Year	Peak chart positions	Album
Title	Year	KOR Down.	Album
"See the Light"	2024	169	My Sweet Mobster OST
"I Rise"	2026	116	The Remarried Empress OST

=== Other charted songs ===
List of other charted songs, showing year released, chart positions, and name of the album
Title	Year	Peak chart positions	Album
Title	Year	KOR Down.	Album
"Countdown (Belle Solo)"	2023	199	Kiss of Life
"Whistle" (Doyoung featuring Belle)	2025	22	Promise

=== Non-commercial releases ===
List of non-commercial songs, showing title and year released
Title	Year	Ref.
"Higher" prod. Ish Hokhmah, hongsamman	2022	
"Venus" prod. Ish Hokhmah	2022	

=== Songwriting credits ===
All song credits are adapted from the Korea Music Copyright Association's database unless stated otherwise.

List of songs, showing year released, artist name, and name of the album
Title	Year	Artist	Album	Composer	Lyricist
"Find You"	2021	Purple Kiss	LULUPOP Project 'Find You'	Yes	No
"Kitty"	2021	Kid Milli	Cliché	No	Yes
"Into You"	2021	DaDaBoo	Non-album single	Yes	No
"Softly"	2022	Miyeon	My	Yes	No
"Charging"	2022	Miyeon	My	Yes	No
"True Vibe"	2022	Soulbysel	SOULBYSEL Complication 02	No	Yes
"Unforgiven"	2023	Le Sserafim	Unforgiven	Yes	Yes
"Shhh"	2023	Kiss of Life	Kiss of Life	Yes	Yes
"Countdown"	2023	Kiss of Life	Kiss of Life	Yes	Yes
"My 808"	2023	Kiss of Life	Born to Be XX	No	Yes
"Says It"	2023	Kiss of Life	Born to Be XX	Yes	Yes
"Te Quiero"	2024	Kiss of Life	Sticky	Yes	Yes
"Sky Walking"	2024	Miyeon	Non-album single	Yes	No
"Maestro of My Heart"	2024	Kiss of Life	STF Original, Vol 1	No	Yes
"Get Loud"	2024	Kiss of Life	Lose Yourself	Yes	No
"Swan"	2024	Miyeon	STF Original, Vol. 2.5	No	Yes
"Ibam" (이밤)	2024	Shim Shin	Non-album single	No	Yes
"Hypnotize"	2024	Viviz	Voyage	Yes	No
"Twilight"	2024	Dress feat Belle & Big Naughty	CMKY	Yes	Yes
"Everything Bout You"	2024	Dress feat Belle & Loco	CMKY	Yes	Yes
"Focused" (Demo)	2025	Belle	Non-album release	Yes	Yes
"Bam Bam Bam" (밤밤밤)	2025	Rescene	The First Night with the Duke OST, Pt. 1	Yes	No

== Filmography ==
=== Television show ===
Year	Title	Role	Ref.
2024	King of Mask Singer	as When Flowers Bloom Spring Comes	

== Awards and nominations ==
Name of the award ceremony, year presented, category, nominee of the award, and the result of the nomination
Award ceremony	Year	Category	Nominee / Work	Result	Ref.
Korea Best Brand Awards	2023	Proud Korean Award – Composer	"Unforgiven"	Won	
