= Bad News (Kiss of Life song) =

Single by Kiss of Life

from the EP Born to Be XX
- Released: November 8, 2023
- Genre: Pop; hip-hop; rock
- Length: 2:40
- Label: S2
- Composers: Strawberrybananaclub; Jonghan; Rick Bridges
- Lyricists: Rick Bridges; Jonghan; PAPRIKAA; Strawberrybananaclub

Kiss of Life singles chronology
"Shhh" (2023)	"Bad News" (2023)	"Nobody Knows" (2023)

Music video
- "Bad News" on YouTube

"Bad News" is a song by South Korean girl group Kiss of Life. The song was released on November 8, 2023, as one of the lead singles from their second extended play Born to Be XX.

== Background ==
On September 28, 2023, S2 Entertainment released a poster indicating that Kiss of Life would make their comeback in November. On October 13, 2023, the group revealed in a teaser that they would make a comeback on November 8, 2023. On October 30, the group released the sneak peek of the tracks revealing "Bad News" as the lead single. On November 6, the group released a teaser for the music video.

== Composition ==
The song is a groovy mid-tempo that blends elements of pop, hip-hop, and rock, incorporation of 1990s and 2000s hip-hop elements, which makes it feel like a natural evolution of the burgeoning band's sound which features a guitar riff.

== Music video ==
The music video for "Bad News" finds the members facing off against those who have wronged them, from a rude man on the subway to a school bully.

== Critical reception ==
Writing for IZM, Lim Dong-yeop said that though the song is not gorgeous, and the sound is relaxed and not impressive, the melody is comfortable. "Unlike the title 'Bad news', it's 'good news', and there's nothing more in the music world."

Professional ratings
Review scores
Source	Rating
IZM	4.5/5 stars

== Commercial performance ==
"Bad News" debuted and peaked at number 157 on the Circle Digital Chart in the chart issue dated January 7–13, 2024.

== Promotion ==
Kiss of Life performed "Bad News" on four music programs: Mnet's M Countdown on November 9, KBS' Music Bank on November 10, and SBS' Inkigayo on November 12.

== Charts ==
=== Weekly charts ===
Weekly chart performance for "Bad News"
Chart (2023)	Peak position
South Korea (Circle)	164

=== Monthly charts ===
Monthly chart performance for "Bad News"
Chart (2023)	Position
South Korea (Circle)	121

== Release history ==
Release history for "Bad News"
Region	Date	Format	Label
Various	November 8, 2023	Digital download; streaming	S2
