= List of awards and nominations received by Le Sserafim =

Le Sserafim awards and nominations
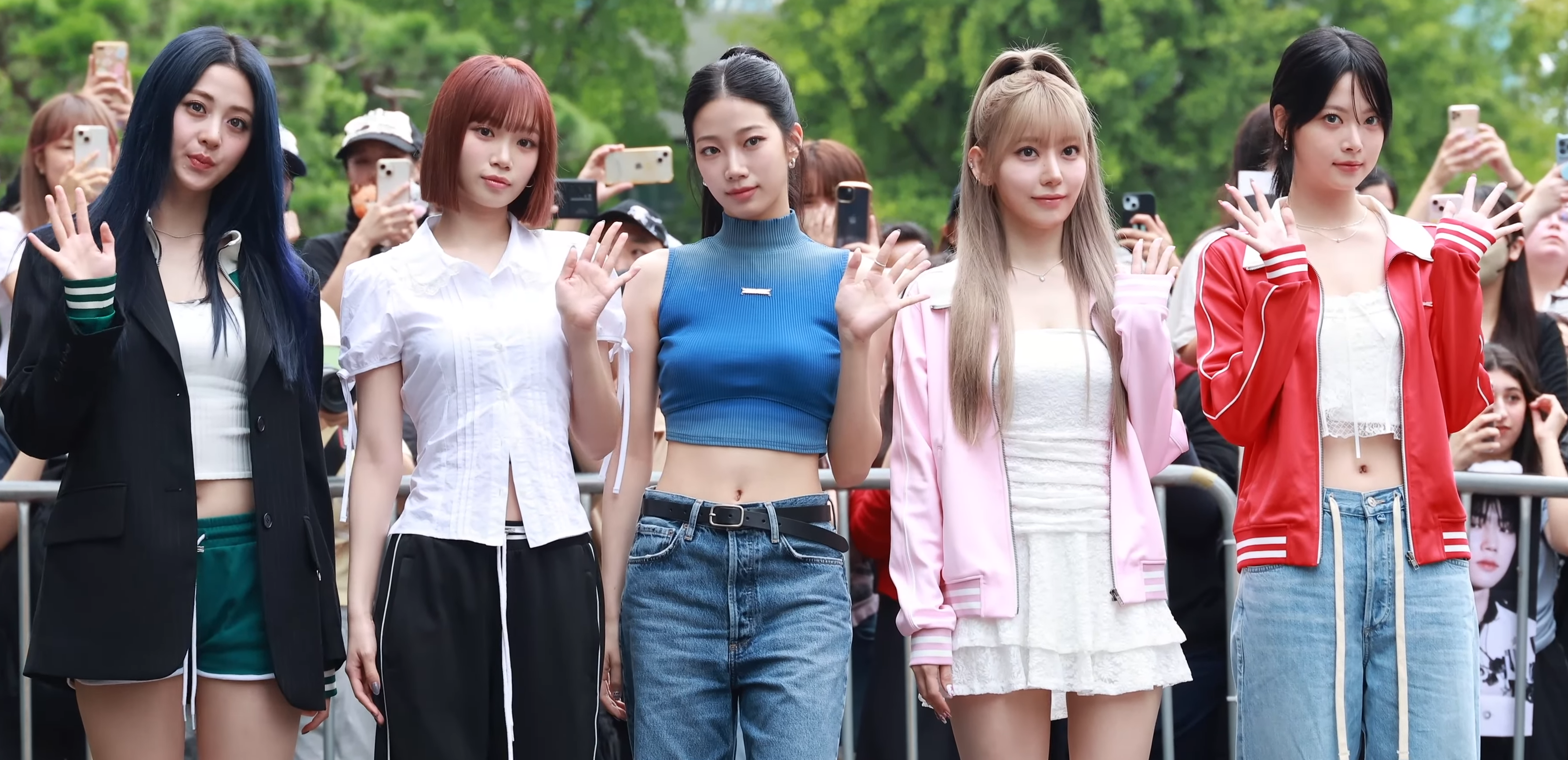
- Le Sserafim in 2024
Awards and nominations
Award	Wins	Nominations
American Music Awards	0	1
Asia Artist Awards	7	13
Asian Pop Music Awards	3	4
Billboard Music Awards	0	1
Circle Chart Music Awards	4	8
The Fact Music Awards	1	6
Genie Music Awards	0	1
Golden Disc Awards	6	13
Hanteo Music Awards	1	18
iHeartRadio Music Awards	0	1
Japan Record Awards	1	1
K-Global Heart Dream Awards	3	3
Korea First Brand Awards	1	1
Korean Music Awards	0	3
MAMA Awards	3	26
Melon Music Awards	4	18
MTV Europe Music Awards	1	3
MTV Video Music Awards	1	2
MTV Video Music Awards Japan	0	3
Music Awards Japan	0	7
SEC Awards	1	2
Seoul Music Awards	4	14

Totals (Note: Certain award groups do not simply award one winner. They acknowledge several different recipients, have runners-up, and have third place. Since this is a specific recognition and is different from losing an award, runner-up mentions are considered wins in this award tally. For simplification and to avoid errors, each award in this list has been presumed to have had a prior nomination.)
- Wins: 41
- Nominations: 155

Le Sserafim is a South Korean girl group formed by Source Music, a sub-label of Hybe. The group has received various accolades, including those from major South Korean awards ceremonies such as the Asian Artist Awards (AAA), MAMA Awards (MAMA), Melon Music Awards (MMA), Golden Disc Awards (GDA), and Seoul Music Awards (SMA).

== Awards and nominations ==
Name of the award ceremony, year presented, award category, nominee(s) of the award, and the result of the nomination
Award ceremony	Year	Category	Nominee(s)/work(s)	Result	Ref.
American Music Awards	2026	Best Female K-Pop Artist	Le Sserafim	Nominated	
Asia Artist Awards	2022	Best Musician Award	Le Sserafim	Won	
Asia Artist Awards	2022	Rookie of the Year – Music	Le Sserafim	Won	
Asia Artist Awards	2022	DCM Popularity Award – Female Singer	Le Sserafim	Nominated	
Asia Artist Awards	2022	Idolplus Popularity Award – Music	Le Sserafim	Nominated	
Asia Artist Awards	2023	Popularity Award – Singer (Female)	Le Sserafim	Nominated	
Asia Artist Awards	2024	Best Artist Award – Music	Le Sserafim	Won	
Asia Artist Awards	2024	Best Music Video	"Crazy"	Won	
Asia Artist Awards	2024	Performance of the Year (Daesang)	Le Sserafim	Won	
Asia Artist Awards	2024	Popularity Award – Singer (Female)	Le Sserafim	Nominated	
Asia Artist Awards	2025	Best Artist Award – Music	Le Sserafim	Won	
Asia Artist Awards	2025	Music Icon of the Year (Daesang)	Le Sserafim	Won	
Asia Artist Awards	2025	Popularity Award – Group (Female)	Le Sserafim	Nominated	
Asia Artist Awards	2026	Popularity Award – Group (Female)	Le Sserafim	Pending	
Asian Pop Music Awards	2023	Top 20 Songs of the Year (Overseas)	"Unforgiven" (featuring Nile Rodgers)	Won	
Asian Pop Music Awards	2023	Record of the Year (Overseas)	"Unforgiven" (featuring Nile Rodgers)	Nominated	
Asian Pop Music Awards	2024	Record of the Year (Overseas)	"Easy"	Won	
Asian Pop Music Awards	2024	Top 20 Songs of the Year (Overseas)	"Easy"	Won	
Billboard Music Awards	2024	Top Global K-Pop Song	"Perfect Night"	Nominated	
Circle Chart Music Awards	2023	Artist of the Year – Global Digital Music (May)	"Fearless"	Won	
Circle Chart Music Awards	2023	Artist of the Year – Global Digital Music (October)	"Antifragile"	Won	
Circle Chart Music Awards	2023	New Artist of the Year – Digital	"Fearless"	Nominated	
Circle Chart Music Awards	2023	New Artist of the Year – Physical	Antifragile	Nominated	
Circle Chart Music Awards	2024	Artist of the Year – Digital	"Unforgiven" (featuring Nile Rodgers)	Won	
Circle Chart Music Awards	2024	Artist of the Year – Streaming Unique Listeners	"Unforgiven" (featuring Nile Rodgers)	Won	
Circle Chart Music Awards	2024	Artist of the Year – Global Streaming	"Unforgiven" (featuring Nile Rodgers)	Nominated	
Circle Chart Music Awards	2024	Mubeat Global Choice Award – Female	Le Sserafim	Nominated	
The Fact Music Awards	2022	Next Leader Award	Le Sserafim	Won	
The Fact Music Awards	2022	Fan N Star Choice Award (Artist)	Le Sserafim	Nominated	
The Fact Music Awards	2022	Four Star Awards	Le Sserafim	Nominated	
The Fact Music Awards	2022	Idolplus Popularity Award	Le Sserafim	Nominated	
The Fact Music Awards	2023	Best Music – Summer	"Unforgiven" (featuring Nile Rodgers)	Nominated	
The Fact Music Awards	2023	Idolplus Popularity Award	Le Sserafim	Nominated	
Genie Music Awards	2022	Best Female Rookie Award	Le Sserafim	Nominated	
Golden Disc Awards	2023	Rookie Artist of the Year	Le Sserafim	Won	
Golden Disc Awards	2023	Best Digital Song (Bonsang)	"Fearless"	Nominated	
Golden Disc Awards	2024	Best Album (Bonsang)	Unforgiven	Won	
Golden Disc Awards	2024	Best Digital Song (Bonsang)	"Unforgiven" (featuring Nile Rodgers)	Won	
Golden Disc Awards	2024	Album of the Year (Daesang)	Unforgiven	Nominated	
Golden Disc Awards	2024	Song of the Year (Daesang)	"Unforgiven" (featuring Nile Rodgers)	Nominated	
Golden Disc Awards	2024	Most Popular Artist (Female)	Le Sserafim	Nominated	
Golden Disc Awards	2025	Best Group	Le Sserafim	Won	
Golden Disc Awards	2025	Most Popular Artist – Female	Le Sserafim	Won	
Golden Disc Awards	2025	Best Digital Song (Bonsang)	"Easy"	Nominated	
Golden Disc Awards	2026	Digital Song Bonsang	"Hot"	Won	
Golden Disc Awards	2026	Digital Daesang (Song of the Year)	"Hot"	Nominated	
Golden Disc Awards	2026	Most Popular Artist – Female	Le Sserafim	Nominated	
Hanteo Music Awards	2024	Artist of the Year	Le Sserafim	Won	
Hanteo Music Awards	2024	Best Continent Artist – Africa	Le Sserafim	Nominated	
Hanteo Music Awards	2024	Best Continent Artist – Asia	Le Sserafim	Nominated	
Hanteo Music Awards	2024	Best Continent Artist – Europe	Le Sserafim	Nominated	
Hanteo Music Awards	2024	Best Continent Artist – North America	Le Sserafim	Nominated	
Hanteo Music Awards	2024	Best Continent Artist – Oceania	Le Sserafim	Nominated	
Hanteo Music Awards	2024	Best Continent Artist – South America	Le Sserafim	Nominated	
Hanteo Music Awards	2024	WhosFandom Award – Female	Fearnot	Nominated	
Hanteo Music Awards	2025	Artists of the Year	Le Sserafim	Nominated	
Hanteo Music Awards	2025	Best Continent Artist – Africa	Le Sserafim	Nominated	
Hanteo Music Awards	2025	Best Continent Artist – Asia	Le Sserafim	Nominated	
Hanteo Music Awards	2025	Best Continent Artist – Europe	Le Sserafim	Nominated	
Hanteo Music Awards	2025	Best Continent Artist – North America	Le Sserafim	Nominated	
Hanteo Music Awards	2025	Best Continent Artist – Oceania	Le Sserafim	Nominated	
Hanteo Music Awards	2025	Best Continent Artist – South America	Le Sserafim	Nominated	
Hanteo Music Awards	2025	Best Popular Artist	Le Sserafim	Nominated	
Hanteo Music Awards	2025	Best Global Popular Artist	Le Sserafim	Nominated	
Hanteo Music Awards	2025	WhosFandom Award	Fearnot	Nominated	
iHeartRadio Music Awards	2025	Favorite K-pop Dance Challenge	"Smart"	Nominated	
Japan Record Awards	2024	Special International Music Award	Le Sserafim	Won	
K-Global Heart Dream Awards	2022	K-Global Best Music Video Award	Le Sserafim	Won	
K-Global Heart Dream Awards	2022	K-Global Super Rookie Award	Le Sserafim	Won	
K-Global Heart Dream Awards	2023	K-Global Best Music Award	Le Sserafim	Won	
Korea First Brand Awards (Note: The 2023 Korea First Brand Awards selected promising brands that are predicted to lead in the year 2023 based on criteria such as consumption trend analysis, extensive nationwide consumer surveys, and evaluation by experts.)	2023	Best Rookie Idol (Female)	Le Sserafim	Won	
Korean Music Awards	2023	Rookie of the Year	Le Sserafim	Nominated	
Korean Music Awards	2023	Best K-Pop Song	"Antifragile"	Nominated	
Korean Music Awards	2023	Best K-Pop Album	Antifragile	Nominated	
MAMA Awards	2022	Favorite New Artist	Le Sserafim	Won	
MAMA Awards	2022	Artist of the Year	Le Sserafim	Nominated	
MAMA Awards	2022	Best Dance Performance Female Group	"Fearless"	Nominated	
MAMA Awards	2022	Best New Female Artist	Le Sserafim	Nominated	
MAMA Awards	2022	Song of the Year	"Fearless"	Nominated	
MAMA Awards	2022	Worldwide Fans' Choice Top 10	Le Sserafim	Nominated	
MAMA Awards	2023	Favorite Dance Performance Female Group	Le Sserafim	Won	
MAMA Awards	2023	Album of the Year	Unforgiven	Nominated	
MAMA Awards	2023	Artist of the Year	Le Sserafim	Nominated	
MAMA Awards	2023	Best Dance Performance Female Group	"Unforgiven" (featuring Nile Rodgers)	Nominated	
MAMA Awards	2023	Best Female Group	Le Sserafim	Nominated	
MAMA Awards	2023	Song of the Year	"Unforgiven" (featuring Nile Rodgers)	Nominated	
MAMA Awards	2023	Worldwide Fans' Choice Top 10	Le Sserafim	Nominated	
MAMA Awards	2024	Album of the Year	Easy	Nominated	
MAMA Awards	2024	Artist of the Year	Le Sserafim	Nominated	
MAMA Awards	2024	Best Choreography	"Crazy"	Nominated	
MAMA Awards	2024	Best Female Group	Le Sserafim	Nominated	
MAMA Awards	2024	Best Dance Performance – Female Group	"Easy"	Nominated	
MAMA Awards	2024	Song of the Year	"Crazy" and "Easy"	Nominated	
MAMA Awards	2024	Worldwide Fans' Choice Top 10	Le Sserafim	Nominated	
MAMA Awards	2025	Fans' Choice Top 10 – Female	Le Sserafim	Won	
MAMA Awards	2025	Artist of the Year	Le Sserafim	Nominated	
MAMA Awards	2025	Best Dance Performance – Female Group	"Hot"	Nominated	
MAMA Awards	2025	Best Female Group	Le Sserafim	Nominated	
MAMA Awards	2025	Fans' Choice of the Year	Le Sserafim	Nominated	
MAMA Awards	2025	Song of the Year	"Hot"	Nominated	
MAMA Awards	2026	Artist of the Year	Le Sserafim	Pending	
MAMA Awards	2026	Best Collaboration	"Iconic by Mistake" (with Illit and Katseye)	Pending	
MAMA Awards	2026	Best Collaboration	"Spaghetti" (with J-Hope)	Pending	
MAMA Awards	2026	Best Dance Performance – Female Group	Le Sserafim	Pending	
MAMA Awards	2026	Best Female Group	Le Sserafim	Pending	
MAMA Awards	2026	Fans' Choice Top 10 – Female	Le Sserafim	Pending	
Melon Music Awards	2022	Best Performance – Female	Le Sserafim	Won	
Melon Music Awards	2022	Hot Trend Award	Le Sserafim	Won	
Melon Music Awards	2022	Artist of the Year	Le Sserafim	Nominated	
Melon Music Awards	2022	Best New Artist	Le Sserafim	Nominated	
Melon Music Awards	2022	Netizen Popularity Award	Le Sserafim	Nominated	
Melon Music Awards	2022	Top 10 Artist Award	Le Sserafim	Nominated	
Melon Music Awards	2023	Millions Top 10 Artist	Unforgiven	Won	
Melon Music Awards	2023	Top 10 Artist Award	Le Sserafim	Won	
Melon Music Awards	2023	Album of the Year	Unforgiven	Nominated	
Melon Music Awards	2023	Artist of the Year	Le Sserafim	Nominated	
Melon Music Awards	2023	Best Female Group	Le Sserafim	Nominated	
Melon Music Awards	2023	Favorite Star Award	Le Sserafim	Nominated	
Melon Music Awards	2023	Song of the Year	"Unforgiven" (featuring Nile Rodgers)	Nominated	
Melon Music Awards	2024	Album of the Year	Easy	Nominated	
Melon Music Awards	2024	Best Female Group	Le Sserafim	Nominated	
Melon Music Awards	2024	Top 10 Artist	Le Sserafim	Nominated	
Melon Music Awards	2025	Top 10 Artist	Le Sserafim	Nominated	
Melon Music Awards	2025	Best Female Group	Le Sserafim	Nominated	
Melon Music Awards	2026	Top 10 Global Artist	Le Sserafim	Pending	
MTV Europe Music Awards	2024	Best Push	Le Sserafim	Won	
MTV Europe Music Awards	2024	Best K-Pop	Le Sserafim	Nominated	
MTV Europe Music Awards	2024	Best New	Le Sserafim	Nominated	
MTV Video Music Awards	2024	Push Performance of the Year	"Easy"	Won	
MTV Video Music Awards	2026	Best K-pop	"Spaghetti" (with J-Hope)	Nominated	
Music Awards Japan	2025	Best K-pop Song in Japan	"Perfect Night"	Nominated	
Music Awards Japan	2025	Best of Listeners' Choice: International Song	"Perfect Night"	Nominated	
Music Awards Japan	2025	Best of Listeners' Choice: International Song	"Crazy"	Nominated	
Music Awards Japan	2026	Best K-Pop Artist	Le Sserafim	Nominated	
Music Awards Japan	2026	Best K-Pop Song in Japan	"Different"	Nominated	
Music Awards Japan	2026	International Song powered by Spotify	"Different"	Nominated	
Music Awards Japan	2026	International Song powered by Spotify	"Spaghetti" (with J-Hope)	Nominated	
SEC Awards	2026	International Feat of the Year	"Spaghetti" (with J-Hope)	Won	
SEC Awards	2026	International Group/Duo of the Year	Le Sserafim	Nominated	
Seoul Music Awards	2023	Rookie of the Year	Le Sserafim	Won	
Seoul Music Awards	2023	Popularity Award	Le Sserafim	Nominated	
Seoul Music Awards	2023	Hallyu Special Award	Le Sserafim	Nominated	
Seoul Music Awards	2024	Main Award (Bonsang)	Le Sserafim	Nominated	
Seoul Music Awards	2024	Popularity Award	Le Sserafim	Nominated	
Seoul Music Awards	2024	Hallyu Special Award	Le Sserafim	Nominated	
Seoul Music Awards	2025	Main Prize (Bonsang)	Le Sserafim	Nominated	
Seoul Music Awards	2025	Popularity Award	Le Sserafim	Nominated	
Seoul Music Awards	2025	K-Wave Special Award	Le Sserafim	Nominated	
Seoul Music Awards	2025	K-pop World Choice – Group	Le Sserafim	Nominated	
Seoul Music Awards	2026	Main Prize (Bonsang)	Le Sserafim	Won	
Seoul Music Awards	2026	World Best Artist	Le Sserafim	Won	
Seoul Music Awards	2026	K-Wave Special Award	Le Sserafim	Nominated	
Seoul Music Awards	2026	Best Song Award	"Spaghetti" (with J-Hope)	Won	

== Other accolades ==
=== State and cultural honors ===
Name of country, year given, and name of honor
Country	Award ceremony	Year	Honor or award	Ref.
South Korea	Korean Popular Culture and Arts Awards (Note: Honors are given at the Korean Popular Culture and Arts Awards, arranged by the Korea Creative Content Agency and hosted by the Ministry of Culture, Sports and Tourism. They are awarded to those who have contributed to the arts and South Korea's pop culture.)	2025	Minister of Culture, Sports and Tourism Commendation	

=== Listicles ===
Name of publisher, year listed, name of listicle, and placement
Publisher	Year	Listicle	Placement	Ref.
Forbes	2023	30 Under 30 – Asia (Entertainment & Sports)	Placed	
Forbes Korea	2025	K-Idol of the Year 30	14th	
