= Blessing in Disguise =

A Blessing in disguise is an English language idiom.

Blessing in Disguise may also refer to:

== Music ==
- A Blessing in Disguise, a 2003 album by Green Carnation
- Blessing in Disguise (Metal Church album), a 1989 album
- Blessing in Disguise, a 1994 album by Annie Haslam with Renaissance
- "Blessing in Disguise" (song), a 2023 single by Huh Yunjin

== Literature ==
- Sengsara Membawa Nikmat or Blessing in Disguise, a 1929 novel by Tulis Sutan Sati
- Blessing in Disguise, a play by Jason Howland and Larry Pellegrini
