= Flame Rises Tour =

2023 concert tour by Le Sserafim

- Tour by Le Sserafim
- Official poster
- Location: Asia
- Associated albums: Fearless; Antifragile; Unforgiven
- Start date: August 12, 2023
- End date: October 3, 2023
- No. of shows: 11
- Box office: $7,900,000

Le Sserafim concert chronology
- Flame Rises Tour (2023); Easy Crazy Hot Tour (2025-2026)

The Flame Rises Tour was the first concert tour by South Korean girl group Le Sserafim, held in support of their first studio album, Unforgiven (2023). The tour began on August 12, 2023 in Seoul, South Korea, and concluded on October 3, 2023, in Jakarta, Indonesia, with a total of 11 shows in six cities across Asia. The tour was commercially successful, grossing $7.9 million and becoming one of the top 10 highest-grossing K-pop tours of 2023.

== Background ==
The Flame Rises Tour was announced by Source Music on June 28, 2023. Shows were confirmed in South Korea, Japan, Hong Kong, Indonesia, and Thailand. The Seoul shows were immediately popular, with all tickets selling out within 8 minutes of becoming available.

The tour's title, "Flame Rises", is an anagram of Le Sserafim's name, itself an anagram of "I'm Fearless". Member Sakura explained that the name represented the group "burning the path we walked behind us so there would be no going back, our only choice would be to keep going forward."

The set list began with "The World Is My Oyster", the first track from Le Sserafim's debut EP Fearless (2022), and ended with "Fire in the Belly", the last track from their then-most recent release, Unforgiven (2023). This structure was chosen to represent the group's growth from their debut to the present. As many of the songs featured particularly intense choreography, the members' outfits were designed with zippers to enable them to change clothing quickly in between songs.

To promote the Hong Kong show, a pop-up store was opened between September 21 and October 8, selling exclusive merchandise themed around the tour.

The tour ended prematurely on October 7, 2023, when Source Music announced that the two shows that had been planned in Bangkok, Thailand, had been cancelled due to members Kim Chaewon, Huh Yunjin, and Kazuha contracting influenza.

== Concert synopsis ==
The show featured a set list of 17 songs, and took place over four distinct acts: "Embers," "Ignite," "Flame" and "Rises". Each act was separated by pre-recorded videos and featured speeches and commentary from the members in between songs.

The first act, "Embers", opened with "The World Is My Oyster", as an LED screen rose to reveal the members standing on a raised stage. They then fell backwards from the stage, disappearing from view as the lighting faded to black, after which the group reappeared to perform their debut single, "Fearless". This was followed by a rendition of "The Great Mermaid", in which the members were joined by 20 backup dancers and surrounded by ocean-themed imagery. The group then performed "Blue Flame" and "Impurities" to finish the act. The next act, "Ignite", began with a rock-themed performance of "No Celestial" using standing microphones, followed by the softer tracks "Sour Grapes" and "Good Parts". The act continued with the members singing a new song, "We got so much" (Note: "We got so much" was a new song performed for the first time as part of the tour. It was later formally released on the EP Easy (2024).), and concluded with "Flash Forward".

The third act, "Flame", returned high-energy tracks to the forefront. The group performed "Antifragile", brought the backup dancers back to the stage for "The Hydra", continued with "Eve, Psyche & the Bluebeard's Wife", and concluded with "Unforgiven". The encore act, "Rises", began with a focus on fan interactions as the members performed the song "Fearnot (Between You, Me, and the Lamppost)", dedicated to their fanbase. They then delivered speeches sharing their thoughts on the show and their progress as a group, before continuing on to sing "No Return (Into the Unknown)" and performing a call and response with the audience on "Fire in the Belly" to conclude the concert.

== Critical reception ==
The Flame Rises Tour was generally well received. Critics including Cho Yong-jun of Korea JoongAng Daily and Dong Sun-hwa of The Korea Times praised the set list and the members' interactions with the audience. Brandon Raeburn of Bandwagon Asia commended the group's confidence on stage, writing that their choreography "spoke volumes of their self-assuredness". Carmen Chin of NME awarded the Osaka show four out of five stars, writing that the members showed "incredible levels of charisma and showmanship that can only be compared to that of seasoned acts".

Others were less positive. Choi Ji-won of The Korea Herald offered a mixed review, calling the tour "a valiant first attempt" and praising the set list, but criticizing the members' performances and the production. Jeong Seung-min of MHN praised the group's stage performance and appreciation for their fans, but considered the set list to be lacking and opined that too much of the show consisted of commentary and videos.

== Set list ==
This set list is taken from the Seoul show on August 13, 2023, and is not intended to be representative of all shows.

Embers

1. "The World Is My Oyster"
2. "Fearless"
3. "The Great Mermaid"
4. "Blue Flame"
5. "Impurities"

Ignite

6. "No Celestial"
7. "Sour Grapes"
8. "Good Parts (when the quality is bad but I am)"
9. "We got so much"
10. "Flash Forward"

Flame

11. "Antifragile"
12. "The Hydra"
13. "Eve, Psyche & the Bluebeard's Wife"
14. "Unforgiven"

Rises

15. "Fearnot (Between You, Me, and the Lamppost)"
16. "No Return (Into the Unknown)"
17. "Fire in the Belly"

== Tour dates ==
List of concert dates
Date (2023)	City	Country	Venue	Attendance	Revenue
August 12	Seoul	South Korea	Jamsil Arena	10,500	$7,900,000
August 13	Seoul	South Korea	Jamsil Arena	10,500	$7,900,000
August 23	Nagoya	Japan	Nippon Gaishi Hall	60,000	$7,900,000
August 24	Nagoya	Japan	Nippon Gaishi Hall	60,000	$7,900,000
August 30	Tokyo	Japan	Yoyogi National Gymnasium	60,000	$7,900,000
August 31	Tokyo	Japan	Yoyogi National Gymnasium	60,000	$7,900,000
September 6	Osaka	Japan	Osaka-jō Hall	60,000	$7,900,000
September 7	Osaka	Japan	Osaka-jō Hall	60,000	$7,900,000
September 30	Hong Kong		AsiaWorld–Expo Hall 10	—	$7,900,000
October 1	Hong Kong		AsiaWorld–Expo Hall 10	—	$7,900,000
October 3	Jakarta	Indonesia	Jakarta International Expo	—	$7,900,000
Total				—	$7,900,000

=== Cancelled shows ===
List of cancelled shows
Date (2023)	City	Country	Venue	Reason
October 7	Bangkok	Thailand	Thunder Dome	Cancelled due to members' health.
October 8	Bangkok	Thailand	Thunder Dome	Cancelled due to members' health.

== Recorded shows ==
Three shows of the tour were filmed for home release. The shows on August 12 and 13, 2023 in Seoul were filmed and released via digital distribution on June 28, 2024. Physical collector's editions were also made available, featuring a photobook with images from the tour. The show on October 30, 2023 in Tokyo was filmed and released on DVD and Blu-ray on September 25, 2024.
