= Blessing in Disguise (song) =

2023 single by Huh Yunjin

- Digital cover

Single by Huh Yunjin
- Language: Korean; English
- Released: August 14, 2023
- Recorded: 2023
- Genre: K-pop; funk; disco
- Length: 3:48
- Label: Source Music
- Composers: Huh Yunjin; Pdogg
- Lyricists: Huh Yunjin; Pdogg

Huh Yunjin singles chronology
| "Love You Twice" (2023) | "Blessing in Disguise" (2023) | "Jellyfish" (2025) |

Music video
- "blessing in disguise" on YouTube

"Blessing in Disguise" (stylized in all lowercase) is a song by American singer and songwriter Huh Yunjin. The song was released on 14 August 2023, through Source Music, as Huh's fourth solo single. Written and composed by Huh and Pdogg, the song is a funk track that lyrically addresses her emotions as she returned to South Korea.

== Background and composition ==
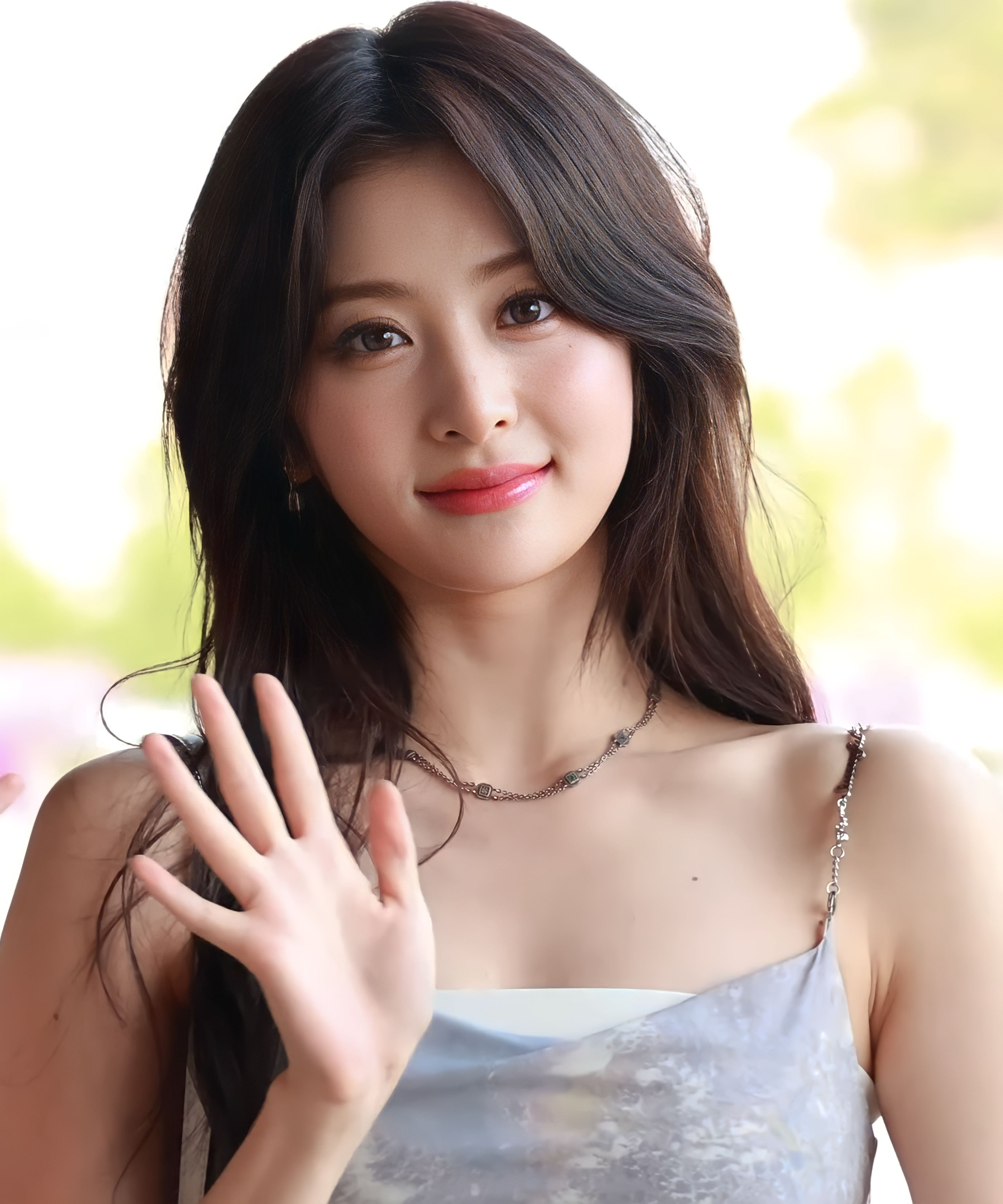
Huh in 2023

"Blessing in Disguise" is Huh's fourth single, and she wrote and composed the song herself, with South Korean producer Pdogg also credited as a lyricist and composer. The lyrics of "Blessing in Disguise" draw on Huh's background as a trainee in the K-pop industry, and reflect on her tumultuous emotions, including fear, excitement, and regret, upon returning to South Korea. She was also inspired by the storytelling and self-reflection in the music of American singer-songwriter Taylor Swift to write a song that would tell her own story.

Initially, Huh had difficulty coming up with the message of the song, but eventually decided to frame it as though she was speaking to a friend, after which she wrote the lyrics in just two hours. The track shifts between Huh's internal monologues and thoughts that she could share with a confidante. Huh considered her experience being cut from the program Produce 48 and sent back to the United States to be "the biggest blessing in disguise", as it ultimately led her to debut with girl group Le Sserafim; this inspired the title and lyrical content of the song.

Musically, "Blessing in Disguise" is a funk track with elements of disco, characterized by a prominent bassline and "lush" synths. This was a new genre for Huh, as her previous singles were primarily R&B and rock tracks, and she described it as "out of my comfort zone". The track opens with a short spoken word introduction by Huh in the form of an airport boarding call, representing her journey back from the US to Korea, before the full song begins. In terms of musical notation, the song is in the key of G major with a tempo of 115 beats per minute.

== Release and music video ==
Before its official release, Huh performed "Blessing in Disguise" at the 2023 Weverse Con Festival in June 2023.

The song was released on 14 August 2023, alongside a music video featuring a montage of various video clips that Huh filmed herself. Huh was assisted in the production of the video by a director who had previously worked on other music videos for Le Sserafim's albums. She described the video as "a montage...showing you little snippets of my life", with shots including plane trips from New York City to Incheon, late-night studio sessions, and the members of Le Sserafim supporting Huh in her new career. The song was released just as the group's first concert tour, the Flame Rises Tour, was getting underway; Source Music stated they considered this to be an opportune moment for the release of the song.

== Commercial performance ==
"Blessing in Disguise" did not enter the Circle Digital Chart, but peaked at number 64 on the Download Chart for week 33 of 2023.
