= Easy (Le Sserafim song) =

- English version cover (Note: Remix version cover uses a pink background.)

Single by Le Sserafim

from the EP Easy
- Language: Korean; English
- Released: February 19, 2024
- Genre: R&B; trap
- Length: 2:45
- Label: Source; YG Plus; Geffen
- Songwriters: Amanda "Kiddo A.I." Ibanez; Sean Turk; Joseph Barrios; Alex Fernandez; Jordyn Smith; Hadar Adora; Supreme Boi; Score (13); Megatone (13); "Hitman" Bang
- Producers: Sean Turk; Cashae; 13

Le Sserafim singles chronology
"Perfect Night" (2023)	"Easy" (2024)	"Smart" (2024)

Music video
- "Easy" on YouTube

"Easy" is a song recorded by South Korean girl group Le Sserafim for their third extended play of the same name. It was released as the EP's lead single by Source Music on February 19, 2024.

The song peaked at number three on South Korea's Circle Digital Chart, as well as number one in Hong Kong, Singapore, and Taiwan. It became the group's first entry on the US Billboard Hot 100, and their first top-ten song on the Billboard Global Excl. U.S. chart.

== Background and release ==
On January 22, 2024, Source Music announced that Le Sserafim would be releasing their third extended play titled Easy on February 19. On February 7, five track sampler videos were released. A day later, the track listing was released with "Easy" announced as the lead single. On February 13, the highlight medley teaser video was released. The music videos teasers was released on February 16 and 18. The song was released alongside its music video and the extended play on February 19.

== Composition ==
"Easy" was written and produced by Sean Turk with Amanda "Kiddo A.I." Ibanez, Joseph Barrios, Alex Fernandez, Jordyn Smith, Hadar Adora, Supreme Boi, Score (13), and Megatone (13), and "Hitman" Bang participating in the writing, and Cashae and 13 participating in the production. Described as a R&B trap song with lyrics containing the message "of the five members' determination to make everything look easy, even though nothing is easy", "Easy" was composed in the key of C major, with a tempo of 165 beats per minute.

== Music video ==
The music video directed by Nina McNeely was released alongside the song by Source Music on February 19. The visual was shot in Los Angeles and features "[the members] strut into what looks like a church [which is] empty aside from overgrowth and trippy neon lights".

== Promotion ==
Prior to the release of Easy, on February 19, 2024, Le Sserafim held two live events on YouTube and Weverse, aimed at introducing the extended play and connecting with their fans.

== Accolades ==
On South Korean music programs, "Easy" received nine first place awards.

Music program awards for "Easy"
Program	Date	Ref.
Inkigayo	March 3, 2024	
Inkigayo	March 10, 2024	
M Countdown	February 29, 2024	
M Countdown	March 7, 2024	
M Countdown	March 14, 2024	
Music Bank	March 1, 2024	
Music Bank	March 15, 2024	
Show Champion	February 28, 2024	
Show! Music Core	March 2, 2024	

== Track listing ==
- Digital download and streaming – English version
1. "Easy" (English version) – 2:44
2. "Easy" (English version; sped up version) – 2:12
3. "Easy" (English version; slowed + reverb version) – 3:13
- Digital download and streaming – remixes
1. "Easy" – 2:44
2. "Easy" (pluggnb remix) – 2:31
3. "Easy" (drum & bass remix) – 2:44
4. "Easy" (sped up version) – 2:12
5. "Easy" (slowed + reverb version) – 2:13
6. "Easy" (instrumental) – 2:44

== Personnel ==
Adapted from the album liner notes.

- Le Sserafim – lead vocals
- Sean Turk – production, main sample, drums, synthesizer
- Joseph Barrios – production, drums, synthesizer
- Alex Fernandez – production, drums, synthesizer
- Score (13) – production, digital editing, vocal arrangement
- Megatone (13) – production, digital editing, vocal arrangement
- Supreme Boi – vocal arrangement
- Amanda "Kiddo A.I." Ibanez – background vocals
- Manny Marroquin – mix engineering
- Chris Galland – mix engineering
- Chris Gehringer – mastering
- Hwang Min-hee – engineering
- Lee Yeon-soo – engineering
- Ramiro Fernandez-Seoane – mix engineering assistance

== Charts ==
=== Weekly charts ===
Weekly chart performance for "Easy"
Chart (2024)	Peak position
Canada Hot 100 (Billboard)	48
Global 200 (Billboard)	13
Hong Kong (Billboard)	1
Indonesia (Billboard)	18
Japan Hot 100 (Billboard)	17
Japan Combined Singles (Oricon)	15
Malaysia (Billboard)	3
Malaysia International (RIM)	2
Netherlands (Global Top 40)	20
New Zealand Hot Singles (RMNZ)	8
Philippines (Billboard)	20
Singapore (RIAS)	1
South Korea (Circle)	3
Taiwan (Billboard)	1
UK Indie (Official Charts)	46
UK Singles Downloads (Official Charts)	39
UK Singles Sales (OCC)	41
US Billboard Hot 100	99
US World Digital Song Sales (Billboard)	4

=== Monthly charts ===
Monthly chart performance for "Easy"
Chart (2024)	Position
South Korea (Circle)	4

=== Year-end charts ===
Year-end chart performance for "Easy"
Chart (2024)	Position
South Korea (Circle)	39

== Certifications ==
Certifications for "Easy"
Region	Certification	Certified units/sales
Japan (RIAJ)	Gold	50,000,000^{†}
^{†} Streaming-only figures based on certification alone.

== Release history ==
Release history for "Easy"
Region	Date	Format	Version	Label
Various	February 19, 2024	Digital download; streaming	Original	Source; YG Plus; Geffen
Various	February 23, 2024	Digital download; streaming	English	Source; YG Plus; Geffen
Various	February 28, 2024	Digital download; streaming	Remixes	Source; YG Plus; Geffen
