= Smart (song) =

- Remixes cover

Single by Le Sserafim

from the EP Easy
- Language: Korean; English
- Released: March 5, 2024
- Genre: Amapiano
- Length: 2:46
- Label: Source; YG Plus; Geffen
- Songwriters: Score (13); Megatone (13); Supreme Boi; Arineh Karimi; BB Elliot; Zzz; "Hitman" Bang; Paige Garabito; Huh Yunjin; Jasmin Lee Maming; Teodor Herrgårdh; Hadar Adora; Charli; Lee Eun-hwa (153/Joombas)
- Producer: 13

Le Sserafim singles chronology
"Easy" (2024)	"Smart" (2024)	"Crazy" (2024)

Music video
- "Smart" on YouTube

"Smart" is a song recorded by South Korean girl group Le Sserafim for their third extended play, Easy. It was released as the EP's second single by Source Music on March 5, 2024.

== Background and release ==
On January 22, 2024, Source Music announced that Le Sserafim would be releasing their third extended play, Easy, on February 19. On February 7, five track sampler videos were released. A day later, the track listing was released, with "Smart" confirmed as a song on the album. The music videos teaser was released on March 4 and the music video was released the following day, on March 5. On March 20, it was announced that an English version and remixes of the song would be released on March 22.

== Composition ==
"Smart" was written and produced by Score and Megatone of the production collective 13, with Supreme Boi, Arineh Karimi, BB Elliot, Zzz, "Hitman" Bang, Paige Garabito, Jasmin Lee Maming, Teodor Herrgårdh, Hadar Adora, Charli, Lee Eun-hwa, and Le Sserafim member Huh Yunjin participating in the writing. The song was described as an Afropop-inspired Amapiano song. "Smart" was composed in the key of C-sharp major, with a tempo of 113 beats per minute.

== Music video ==
The music video directed by Yong Seok Choi was released by Source Music on March 5, 2024. In the video, the members "[perform] the song's accompanying choreography in the middle of a large, empty warehouse adorned with numerous large tapestries of art hung from the ceiling and on the walls."

== Track listing ==
- Digital download and streaming – remixes
1. "Smart" – 2:46
2. "Smart" (English version) – 2:46
3. "Smart" (smartest remix) – 2:56
4. "Smart" (chill remix) – 2:42
5. "Smart" (Miami bass remix) – 2:15
6. "Smart" (festival house remix) – 2:25
7. "Smart" (sped up version) – 2:09
8. "Smart" (slowed + reverb remix) – 3:55
9. "Smart" (instrumental) – 2:46

== Personnel ==
Adapted from the album liner notes.

- Le Sserafim – lead vocals
- Score (13) – production, keyboards, drums digital editing, vocal arrangement
- Megatone (13) – production, bass, guitar, digital editing, vocal arrangement
- Arineh Karimi – background vocals
- Jasmine Lee Maming – background vocals
- Jordan "DJ Swivel" Young – mix engineering
- Chris Gehringer – mastering
- Hwang Min-hee – engineering
- Lee Yeon-soo – engineering

== Charts ==
=== Weekly charts ===
Weekly chart performance for "Smart"
Chart (2024)	Peak position
Canada Hot 100 (Billboard)	91
Global 200 (Billboard)	39
Hong Kong (Billboard)	13
Indonesia (Billboard)	22
Japan Hot 100 (Billboard)	46
Japan Combined Singles (Oricon)	44
Malaysia (Billboard)	4
Malaysia (Billboard)	4
Netherlands (Global Top 40)	17
New Zealand Hot Singles (RMNZ)	21
Saudi Arabia (IFPI)	16
Singapore (RIAS)	4
South Korea (Circle)	8
Taiwan (Billboard)	4
US World Digital Song Sales (Billboard)	9

=== Monthly charts ===
Monthly chart performance for "Smart"
Chart (2024)	Position
South Korea (Circle)	11

=== Year-end charts ===
Year-end chart performance for "Smart"
Chart (2024)	Position
South Korea (Circle)	64

== Certifications ==
Certifications for "Smart"
Region	Certification	Certified units/sales
Japan (RIAJ)	Gold	50,000,000^{†}
^{†} Streaming-only figures based on certification alone.

== Release history ==
Release history for "Smart"
Region	Date	Format	Version	Label
Various	February 19, 2024	Digital download; streaming	Original	Source; YG Plus; Geffen
Various	March 22, 2024	Digital download; streaming	English; Remixes	Source; YG Plus; Geffen
