= Unforgiven (Le Sserafim album) =

- Digital and "Vol.3 Bloody Rose" version cover

Studio album by Le Sserafim
- Released: May 1, 2023
- Genre: Experimental pop
- Length: 37:50
- Language: Korean
- Labels: Source; YG Plus; Geffen
- Producers: "Hitman" Bang; 13; Huh Yunjin; Jukjae; Hiss Noise

Le Sserafim chronology
Antifragile (2022)	Unforgiven (2023)	Easy (2024)

Singles from Unforgiven
- 1. "Unforgiven" Released: May 1, 2023; 2. "Eve, Psyche & the Bluebeard's Wife" Released: May 23, 2023

Unforgiven is the first studio album by South Korean girl group Le Sserafim, released by Source Music on May 1, 2023. It contains 13 tracks, including the singles "Unforgiven" and "Eve, Psyche & the Bluebeard's Wife".

The album debuted at number one on the Circle Album Chart and was certified million by the Korea Music Content Association (KMCA) for selling 1,000,000 units. In the United States, it debuted at number 6 on the Billboard 200, becoming the group's first top-ten album. It was awarded the Best Album Bonsang at the 38th Golden Disc Awards. The group embarked on the Flame Rises Tour from August to October 2023 in support of the album.

== Background and release ==
On March 16, 2023, Source Music reported that Le Sserafim would be releasing an album in early May. On April 3, it was confirmed that the group's first studio album would be titled Unforgiven and released on May 1. A day later, the promotional schedule was released. On April 10, the album teaser video was released. On April 17, the track sampler video was released. A day later, the track listing was released with "Unforgiven" announced as the lead single. On April 24, the highlight medley teaser video was released. The music video teasers for "Unforgiven" were released on April 28 and 30. The album was released alongside the music video for "Unforgiven" on May 1. On May 1, Le Sserafim held a live event on YouTube to introduce the album and communicate with their fans.

== Composition ==
Unforgiven consists of 13 tracks, with the first six tracks having previously been released as part of Fearless and Antifragile, respectively. The seventh track, "Burn the Bridge", is a song that "announces the start of Le Sserafim's new journey" with lyrics "based on the members' own writings or what they [had] said in interviews [previously], adding sincerity to the message they wanted to convey". The eighth track and lead single, "Unforgiven", is a hip hop song characterized by "funk guitar rhythms" played by American musician Nile Rodgers; it samples "The Good, the Bad and the Ugly", a theme song used in the film of the same name. Rodgers stated he was excited to work on the song due to the new types of chord changes it included. The ninth track, "No-Return (Into the Unknown)", is a song with lyrics that "expressed the excitement ahead of the adventure". The tenth track, "Eve, Psyche & the Bluebeard's Wife", is a song with lyrics that contain the meaning "you can move on to the next level only when you break the taboo". The eleventh track, "Fearnot (Between You, Me and the Lamppost)", is a song dedicated to the group's fandom, with lyrics written by all of the members. The twelfth track, "Flash Forward", is a social media pop song with lyrics about "risking everything without hesitation even if the ending is obvious". The thirteenth and final track, "Fire in the Belly", is a song with lyrics about "burning the passion in [your] heart by showing the ambition to becoming the winner of an adventure".

== Critical reception ==
Professional ratings
Review scores
Source	Rating
AllMusic	4/5 stars
IZM	2/5 stars

Unforgiven was met with generally positive reviews from critics. Cristina Jaleru of AP News called the album "an absolute firecracker of a record" and "a bold anthem of female empowerment." Neil Z. Yeung of AllMusic wrote that the album is "an ideal entry point into the world of Le Sserafim" and particularly commended the track "Fearnot (Between You, Me and the Lamppost)" for highlighting "the group's vocal harmony." Onome Uyovbievbo of Riff Magazine noted the album's "nonconventional tropes and experimental pop twists" and wrote that "Le Sserafim is setting the example for a new generation of K-pop artists." Paste ranked the album number three in their list of The 20 Best K-pop Albums of 2023. Conversely, Park Su-jin of IZM awarded the album two out of five stars, finding that the production was not cohesive and that it did not convey the group's message well.

=== Accolades ===
Awards and nominations for Unforgiven
Award ceremony	Year	Category	Result	Ref.
Golden Disc Awards	2024	Best Album (Bonsang)	Won	
Golden Disc Awards	2024	Album of the Year (Daesang)	Nominated	

== Commercial performance ==
On April 11, 2023, media outlets reported that Unforgiven had sold over one million copies in pre-orders in less than one week. Pre-orders increased to 1,380,000 copies by April 28. In the United States, the album debuted at No. 6 on the Billboard 200 main album chart on May 15, 2023, with 45,000 album equivalent units earned in its first week, marking the first time Le Sserafim entered the Top 10 of the chart since their debut.

== Track listing ==
Track listing for Unforgiven
No.	Title	Writer(s)	Producer(s)	Length
1.	"The World Is My Oyster" (2023 version)	Score (13); Megatone (13); Hybe	13	1:47
2.	"Fearless" (2023 version)	Score (13); Megatone (13); Supreme Boi; Blvsh; Jaro; Nikolay Mohr; "Hitman" Bang; Oneye; Josefin Glenmark; Emmy Kasai; Kyler Niko; Paulina "Pau" Cerrilla; Destiny Rogers	13	2:48
3.	"Blue Flame" (2023 version)	Score (13); Megatone (13); Jonna Hall; Gayoung (PNP); Kim In-hyung; Danke; Kim Chaewon; Ronnie Icon; Caroline Gustavsson; Huh Yunjin	13	3:22
4.	"The Hydra"	Score (13); Megatone (13); Hybe	13	1:44
5.	"Antifragile"	Score (13); Megatone (13); Paulina "Pau" Cerrilla; "Hitman" Bang; Shintaro Yasuda; Supreme Boi; Isabella Lovestory; Kyler Niko; Ronnie Icon; Nathalie Boone; Danke	13	3:04
6.	"Impurities"	Score (13); Megatone (13); Jonna Hall; Danke; "Hitman" Bang; Huh Yunjin; Daniel "Obi" Klein; Charli Taft; Kim Chae-ah (153/Joombas); Maggie Szabo; Hayes Kramer; Blvsh; Jaro; Nikolay Mohr; Park Sang-yu (PNP); Cho Yoon-kyung (PNP); Lee Hyung-seok (PNP)	13	3:16
7.	"Burn the Bridge"	Score (13); Megatone (13); Hybe	13	2:35
8.	"Unforgiven" (featuring Nile Rodgers)	Score (13); Megatone (13); Supreme Boi; Oneye; Josefin Glenmark; Anders Gukko; Anne Judith Wik; Nermin Harambašić; Benjmn; Feli Ferraro; Kris Jana; Kyler Niko; Young Chance; Belle; Glenda Proby; Makaila J Garcia; Believve	13	3:02
9.	"No-Return (Into the Unknown)"	Score (13); Megatone (13); "Hitman" Bang; Supreme Boi; Daniel "Obi" Klein; Charli Taft; Arineh Karimi; Cazzi Opeia; Young Chance; Shorelle	13	3:05
10.	"Eve, Psyche & the Bluebeard's Wife" (이브, 프시케 그리고 푸른 수염의 아내; Ibeu, Peusike geurigo Pureun Suyeomui anae)	Score (13); Megatone (13); "Hitman" Bang; Supreme Boi; Maia Wright; Max Thulin; Benjmn; Gusten Dahlqvist; Arineh Karimi; Huh Yunjin; Lee Hyung-seok (PNP); Danke	13	3:06
11.	"Fearnot (Between You, Me and the Lamppost)" (피어나; Pieona; 'Bloom')	Score (13); Megatone (13); Jukjae; Huh Yunjin; "Hitman" Bang; Sakura; Kim Chaewon; Hong Eunchae; Kazuha	Huh Yunjin; 13; Jukjae	3:27
12.	"Flash Forward"	Hiss Noise; Alex Karlsson; Stian N. Olsen (Blueprint); Eliza Vassilieva; "Hitman" Bang; Danke; Lee Hyung-seok (PNP)	Hiss Noise	3:16
13.	"Fire in the Belly"	Score (13); Megatone (13); Kyler Niko; Paulina "Pau" Cerrilla; Supreme Boi; Anne Judith Wik; Nermin Harambašić; "Hitman" Bang	13	3:18
Total length:				37:50

Notes

- "Unforgiven" contains portions of "The Good, the Bad and the Ugly", the theme to the film of the same name, written by Ennio Morricone.
- "Fire in the Belly" and "Eve, Psyche, & The Bluebeard's Wife" are stylized in sentence case.
- "Fearnot (Between You, Me, and the Lamppost)" is stylized as "FEARNOT (Between you, me, and the lamppost)".
- "No-Return (Into the Unknown)" is stylized as "No-Return (Into the unknown)".
- "Fearless", "Antifragile", and "Unforgiven" are stylized in all caps.

== Personnel ==
=== Musicians ===
- Le Sserafim – lead vocals (all tracks), background vocals (7, 11)
  - Huh Yunjin – production (11)
- Score (13) – production, keyboards (1–11, 13); drums (2–3, 5–10, 13), digital editing (all tracks), vocal arrangement (all tracks)
- Megatone (13) – production (1–11, 13), bass (1–10, 13), guitar (2–3, 5–7, 13), drums (8–10), keyboards (11), strings (11), digital editing (all tracks), vocal arrangement (all tracks)
- Jukjae – production, guitar (11)
- Hiss Noise – production, keyboards, synthesizer (12)
- Woo Min-jung – digital editing (2)
- Kim Jun-yeong – digital editing (8–10, 12–13)
- Nile Rodgers – guitar (8)
- Hareem – harmonica, ocarina, Irish whistle, background vocals (8)
- Matt Hornbeck – guitar (9)
- George Shelby – saxophone (9)
- Louis Van Taylor – saxophone (9)
- Phillip Whack – saxophone (9)
- Wendell Kelly – trombone (9)
- James Ford – trumpet (9)
- Mike Condone – trumpet (9)
- Craig Young – bass (11)
- Victor Indrizzio – drums (11)
- Sam Hunter – guitar (11)
- Blvsh – background vocals (2)
- Paulina Cerrilla – background vocals (2, 5, 12–13)
- Josefin Glenmark – background vocals (2, 8)
- Sound Kim – background vocals (2, 11)
- Jonna Hall – background vocals (3, 6)
- Isabella Lovestory – background vocals (5)
- Charli Taft – background vocals (6, 9)
- Anne Judith Wik – background vocals (8)
- Kris Jana – background vocals (8)
- Arineh Karimi – background vocals (9–10)
- Cazzi Opeia – background vocals (9)
- Shorelle – background vocals (9)
- Young Chance – background vocals (9–10)
- Belle – background vocals (10)
- Feli Ferraro – background vocals (10)
- Duane Benjamin – horns director (9)
- Stella Jang – vocal arrangement (1)

=== Technical ===
- So Sung-jin – executive producer
- Geoff Swan – mix engineering (1, 4, 7)
- Manny Marroquin – mix engineering (2, 5, 8)
- Chris Galland – mix engineering (2, 5, 8)
- Josh Gudwin – mix engineering (3)
- Tony Maserati – mix engineering (6, 9)
- David K. Younghyun – mix engineering (6, 9)
- James F. Reynolds – mix engineering (10)
- Chris Lord-Alge – mix engineering (11)
- John Hanes – mix engineering (13)
- Chris Gehringer – mastering
- Hwang Min-hee – engineering (1–3, 5–8, 11–13)
- Lee Yeon-soo – engineering (3, 5–7, 9–10)
- Jeon Bu-yeon – engineering (3), mix engineering (12)
- Kim Hyeon-soo – engineering (4)
- Bob Horn – engineering (9)
- Howard Willing – engineering (11)
- Matt Cahill – mix engineering assistance (1, 4, 7)
- Ramiro Fernandez-Seoane – mix engineering assistance (2, 5, 8)
- Heidi Wang – mix engineering assistance (3)
- James Cunningham – mix engineering assistance (10)
- Brian Judd – mix engineering assistance (11)
- Shachar Boussani – engineering assistance (9)
- Austin Brown – engineering assistance (11)

== Charts ==
=== Weekly charts ===
Weekly chart performance for Unforgiven
Chart (2023)	Peak position
Austrian Albums (Ö3 Austria)	43
Belgian Albums (Ultratop Flanders)	32
Belgian Albums (Ultratop Wallonia)	33
Canadian Albums (Billboard)	63
Croatian International Albums (HDU)	35
French Albums (SNEP)	20
German Albums (Offizielle Top 100)	22
Hungarian Albums (MAHASZ)	4
Japanese Albums (Oricon)	1
Japanese Combined Albums (Oricon)	1
Japanese Hot Albums (Billboard Japan)	1
New Zealand Albums (RMNZ)	28
Polish Albums (ZPAV)	72
Portuguese Albums (AFP)	38
South Korean Albums (Circle)	1
Spanish Albums (Promusicae)	70
Swiss Albums (Schweizer Hitparade)	81
UK Album Downloads (Official Charts)	86
US Billboard 200	6
US World Albums (Billboard)	1

=== Monthly charts ===
Monthly chart performance for Unforgiven
Chart (2023)	Position
Japanese Albums (Oricon)	3
South Korean Albums (Circle)	3

=== Year-end charts ===
Year-end chart performance for Unforgiven
Chart (2023)	Position
Japanese Albums (Oricon)	44
Japanese Hot Albums (Billboard Japan)	44
South Korean Albums (Circle)	22
US World Albums (Billboard)	13

== Sales and certifications ==
Sales and certifications for Unforgiven
Region	Certification	Certified units/sales
Japan (RIAJ)	Gold	100,000^{^}
South Korea (KMCA)	Million	1,000,000^{^}
^{^} Shipments figures based on certification alone.

== Release history ==
Release history for Unforgiven
Region	Date	Format	Label
Various	May 1, 2023	Digital download; streaming	Source; YG Plus
South Korea	May 2, 2023	CD	Source; YG Plus
United States	May 5, 2023	CD	Source; Geffen
South Korea	July 10, 2026	NFC	Source Music; YG Plus
