= Huh Yunjin =

American singer (born 2001)

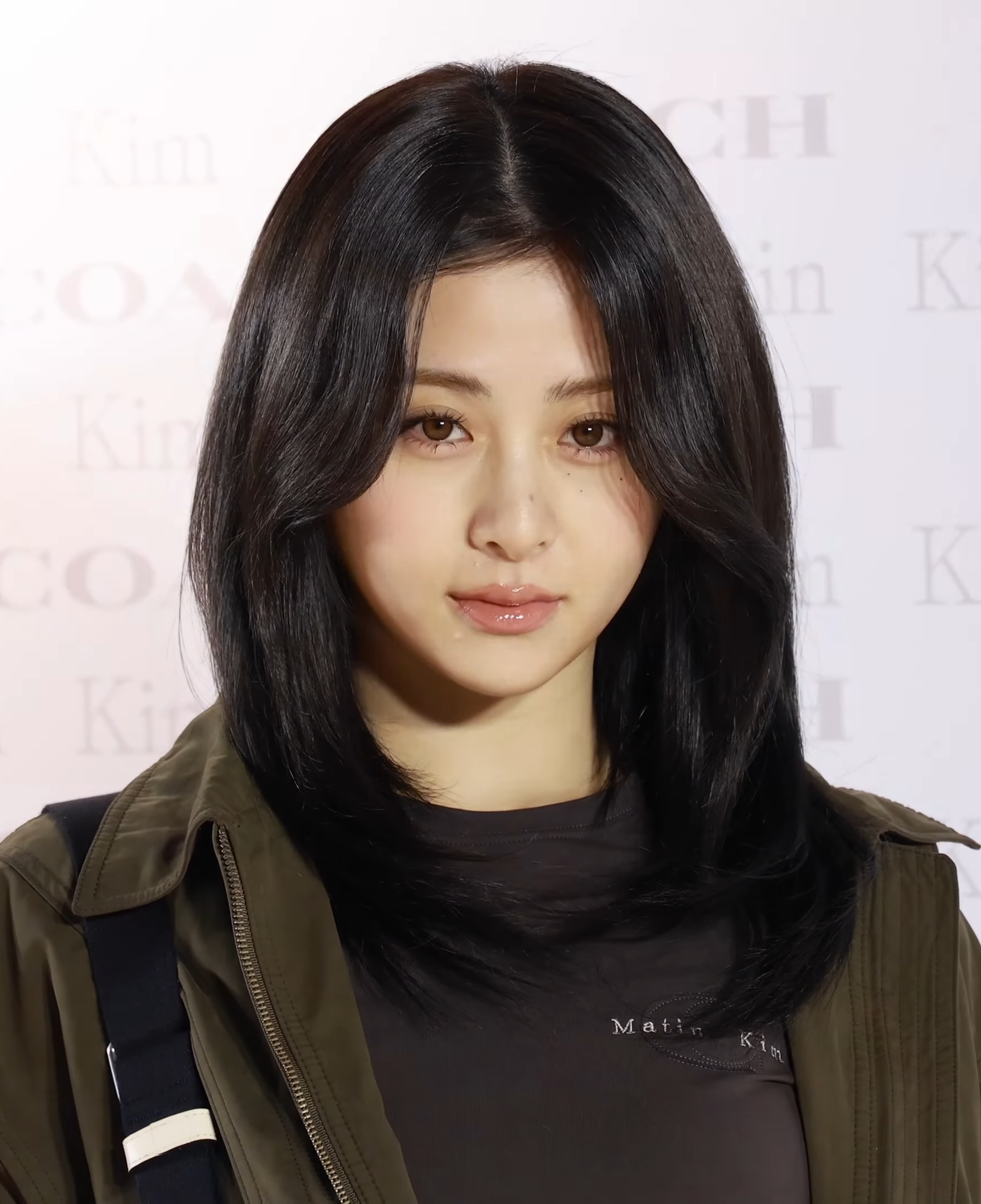
- Yunjin in 2025
- Born: October 8, 2001 (age 25); Seoul, South Korea
- Other name: Jennifer Huh
- Citizenship: United States
- Occupations: Singer; songwriter
- Musical career
- Origin: South Korea
- Genre: K-pop
- Instruments: Vocals; guitar
- Years active: 2018; 2022–present
- Labels: Source; EMI (Note: As a member of Le Sserafim only.); Geffen
- Member of: Le Sserafim

Korean name
- Hangul: 허윤진
- RR: Heo Yunjin
- MR: Hŏ Yunjin

Signature
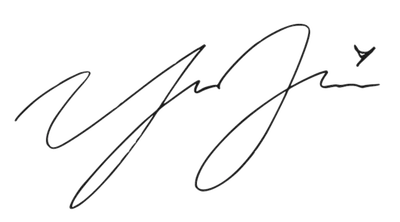

Huh Yunjin (Korean: 허윤진; born October 8, 2001) is an American singer and songwriter based in South Korea. She is a member of the South Korean girl group Le Sserafim, formed by Source Music in 2022.

== Early life and education ==
Huh Yunjin was born on October 8, 2001, in Seoul, South Korea. When she was eight months old, she and her parents relocated to the United States. She was raised in Wisconsin and in Niskayuna, New York, where she went by the English name Jennifer Huh, named after American actress Jennifer Aniston. She also has a sister named Rachel, named after Aniston's character Rachel Green from the American television series Friends. Huh developed an interest in music and songwriting from a young age, finding inspiration in the works of singer-songwriter Taylor Swift and teaching herself how to play Swift's songs on the guitar. While attending Niskayuna High School, she participated in musical theater productions and performed as a mezzo-soprano.

At age 16 in 2017, Huh moved to South Korea to pursue a career as a K-pop idol, becoming a trainee at different companies. She transferred to the Applied Music Department of Hanlim Multi Art School on March 4, 2019. After several years of training without making her debut, Huh considered leaving K-pop, and she moved back to the United States and prepared to attend college. However, she abandoned her plans after Korean entertainment company Hybe contacted her in 2021 and offered her to debut with Le Sserafim, which she accepted.

== Career ==
=== 2018: Produce 48 ===
In 2018, Huh participated in the South Korean survival show Produce 48 by Mnet, representing Pledis Entertainment with After School member Lee Ga-eun. She was eliminated before the show's finale, ranking 26th.

=== 2021–2022: Debut with Le Sserafim ===
On August 24, 2021, it was reported that Huh had signed a contract with Source Music. On March 14, 2022, Source Music announced the launch of a new girl group, Le Sserafim, in collaboration with Hybe Corporation. Huh was revealed as the sixth and final member on April 9, 2022. The group debuted with the extended play (EP) Fearless on May 2, 2022; Huh was credited as a songwriter on the track "Blue Flame". On August 9, 2022, Huh released her first single "Raise Y_our Glass" to commemorate the 100th day of her debut with Le Sserafim. She co-wrote three songs for Le Sserafim's second EP, Antifragile: "Impurities", "No Celestial" and "Good Parts (When the Quality Is Bad but I Am)". The EP was released on October 17, 2022.

=== 2023–present: Solo debut and activities ===
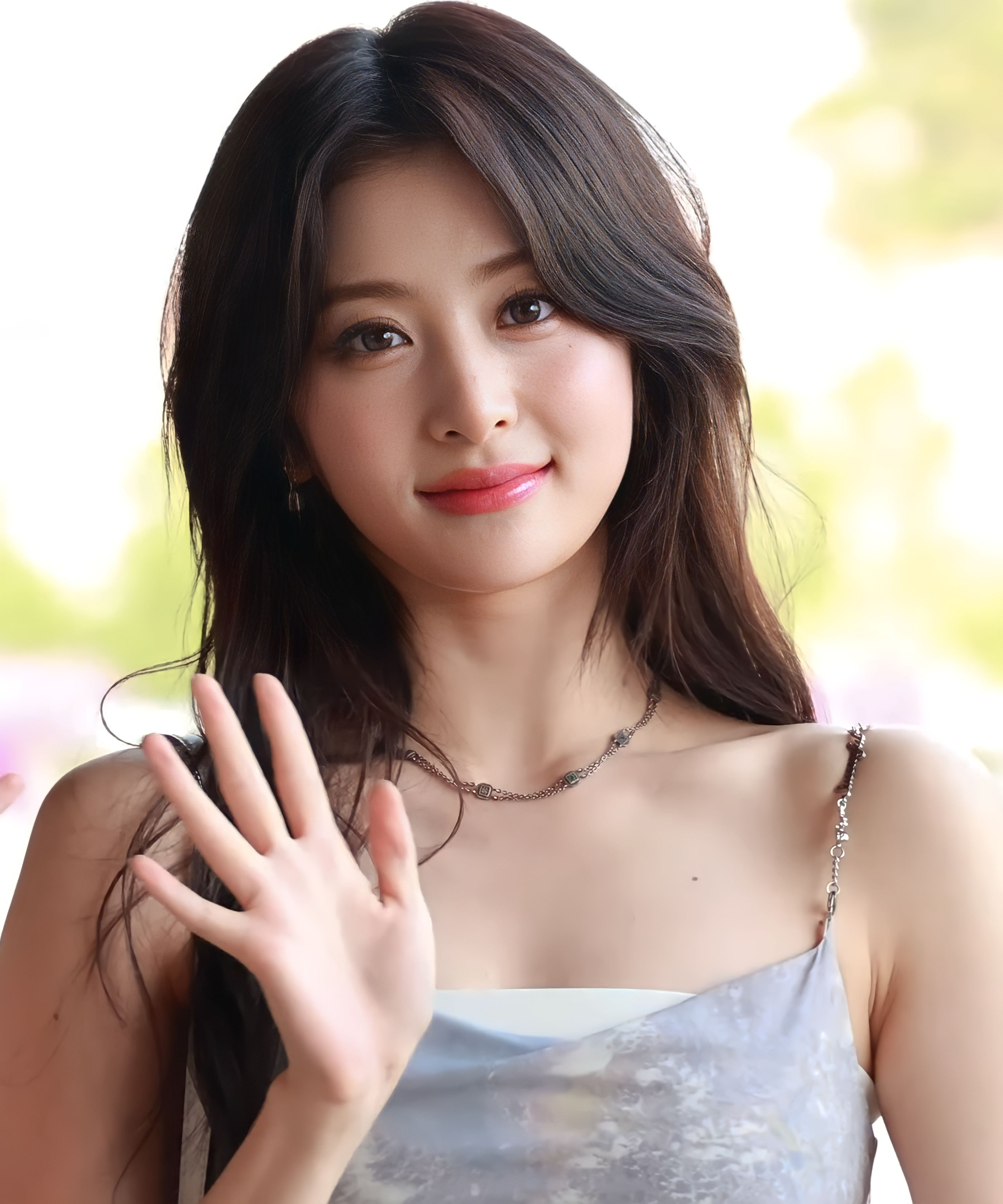
Huh in 2023

Huh released her second single "I ≠ Doll" on January 9, 2023. The self-written rock-influenced track features a trap beat with lyrics describing the judgment she faces as an idol based solely on her physical appearance. The title refers to both the words "idol" and "doll", and the accompanying music video features an animated character illustrated by Huh "navigating the attention and criticism she receives". Regarding the video's protagonist, Huh stated, "I wanted to make a character who is at heart multi-dimensional appear two-dimensional and flat on purpose. I thought it'd be interesting to portray a subject that is not so simple in a simple manner." Divyansha Dongre of Rolling Stone India called the song "a sharp critique of the complexities of constantly living in the spotlight and the judgment that follows".

On March 14, 2023, Huh released her third self-composed song, "Love You Twice" (피어나도록). The Korean title translates to "until it blooms", a reference to the Korean name of Le Sserafim's fans, Fearnot. Accompanying the indie pop single was a music video. Created by South Korean animator and artist Ramdaram, the video depicts a fan inspired by an idol to take better care of herself and learn songwriting before eventually fulfilling her own dream to perform on stage.

Huh released her fourth single "Blessing in Disguise" on August 14, 2023. She had previously performed the song, which she wrote with Pdogg, at the Weverse Con Festival in June 2023. The funk track addresses Huh's return to South Korea, including her fears, excitement, and regrets.

On January 17, 2024, Huh featured on and contributed lyrics to GroovyRoom's "Yes or No" with Crush. The song peaked at number 57 on the Melon real-time chart and remained in the top 10 on the site's Hot 100 chart one month after its release. On February 9, Huh collaborated with American singer Max on his single "Stupid In Love". Also in February, Huh collaborated with J-Hope on the song "I Don't Know" for his album Hope on the Street Vol. 1.

Huh released her fifth self-composed single "Jellyfish" on January 10, 2025. The R&B soul piece was written after Huh had realized that someone's daily life of hard work can appear beautiful to others, just like a jellyfish was to her.

On August 19, 2025, Huh was invited to become a member of the Recording Academy (the American organization that sponsors the Grammy Awards).

== Endorsements ==
On February 28, 2023, Huh became the new muse of the Korean makeup brand WakeMake.

On April 26, 2024, Huh was announced as the new ambassador for MAC Cosmetics Korea.

== Discography ==
=== Singles ===
==== As lead artist ====
List of singles as lead artist, showing year released, selected chart positions, and name of the album
Title	Year	Peak chart positions	Album
Title	Year	KOR	Album
"Raise Y_our Glass"	2022	— (Note: "Raise Y_our Glass" did not enter the Circle Digital Chart, but peaked at number 93 on the component Download Chart.)	Non-album singles
"I ≠ Doll"	2023	199	Non-album singles
"Love You Twice" (피어나도록)	2023	— (Note: "Love You Twice" did not enter the Circle Digital Chart, but peaked at number 83 on the component Download Chart.)	Non-album singles
"Blessing in Disguise"	2023	— (Note: "Blessing in Disguise" did not enter the Circle Digital Chart, but peaked at number 64 on the component Download Chart.)	Non-album singles
"Jellyfish" (해파리)	2025	— (Note: "Jellyfish" did not enter the Circle Digital Chart, but peaked at number 96 on the component Download Chart.)	Non-album singles
"—" denotes a recording that did not chart or was not released in that territory

==== As featured artist ====
List of singles as featured artist, showing year released, selected chart positions, and name of the album
Title	Year	Peak chart positions			Album
Title	Year	KOR	NZ Hot	SGP	Album
"Yes or No" (GroovyRoom featuring Huh Yunjin and Crush)	2024	32	—	—	Non-album single
"Stupid in Love" (Max featuring Huh Yunjin)	2024	136	11	13	Love in Stereo
"I Don't Know" (J-Hope featuring Huh Yunjin)	2024	— (Note: "I Don't Know" did not enter the Circle Digital Chart, but peaked at number 14 on the component Download Chart.)	—	—	Hope on the Street Vol. 1
"—" denotes a recording that did not chart or was not released in that territory

=== Songwriting credits ===
All song credits are adapted from the Korea Music Copyright Association's database unless stated otherwise.

List of songs, showing year released, artist name, and name of the album
Title	Year	Artist(s)	Album	Composer	Lyricist	Producer
"Blue Flame"	2022	Le Sserafim	Fearless	Yes	Yes	No
"Raise Y_our Glass"	2022	Huh Yunjin	Non-album single	Yes	Yes	Yes
"Impurities"	2022	Le Sserafim	Antifragile	Yes	Yes	No
"No Celestial"	2022	Le Sserafim	Antifragile	Yes	Yes	No
"Good Parts (When the Quality Is Bad but I Am)"	2022	Le Sserafim	Antifragile	Yes	Yes	No
"I ≠ Doll"	2023	Huh Yunjin	Non-album single	Yes	Yes	Yes
"Love You Twice" (피어나도록)	2023	Huh Yunjin	Non-album single	Yes	Yes	Yes
"Eve, Psyche & the Bluebeard's Wife" (이브, 프시케 그리고 푸른 수염의 아내)	2023	Le Sserafim	Unforgiven	No	Yes	No
"Fearnot (Between You, Me and the Lamppost)" (피어나)	2023	Le Sserafim	Unforgiven	Yes	Yes	Yes
"Blessing in Disguise"	2023	Huh Yunjin	Non-album single	Yes	Yes	No
"Perfect Night"	2023	Le Sserafim	Non-album single	Yes	Yes	No
"Yes or No"	2024	GroovyRoom feat. Huh Yunjin, Crush	Non-album single	No	Yes	No
"Stupid In Love"	2024	Max feat. Huh Yunjin	Love In Stereo	No	Yes	No
"Swan Song"	2024	Le Sserafim	Easy	Yes	Yes	No
"Smart"	2024	Le Sserafim	Easy	Yes	Yes	No
"We Got So Much"	2024	Le Sserafim	Easy	Yes	Yes	No
"Crazy"	2024	Le Sserafim	Crazy	Yes	Yes	No
"Crazier" (미치지 못하는 이유)	2024	Le Sserafim	Crazy	Yes	Yes	Yes
"Jellyfish" (해파리)	2025	Huh Yunjin	Non-album single	Yes	Yes	Yes
"Hot"	2025	Le Sserafim	Hot	Yes	Yes	No
"Ash"	2025	Le Sserafim	Hot	Yes	Yes	No
"So Cynical (Badum)"	2025	Le Sserafim	Hot	Yes	Yes	No
"Kawaii"	2025	Le Sserafim	Different	No	Yes	No
"Different" (English version)	2025	Le Sserafim	Non-album single	No	Yes	No
"Do the Dance" (빌려온 고양이)	2025	Illit	Bomb	Yes	Yes	No
"Spaghetti"	2025	Le Sserafim feat. J-Hope of BTS	Spaghetti	Yes	Yes	No
"Pearlies (My Oyster is the World)"	2025	Le Sserafim	Spaghetti	Yes	Yes	No
"Celebration"	2026	Le Sserafim	Pureflow Pt. 1	Yes	Yes	No
"Iffy Iffy"	2026	Le Sserafim	Pureflow Pt. 1	Yes	Yes	No
"Need Your Company" (우리 어떻게 더 사귈 수 있을까)	2026	Le Sserafim	Pureflow Pt. 1	Yes	Yes	No
"Sonder"	2026	Le Sserafim	Pureflow Pt. 1	Yes	Yes	No
"Saki"	2026	Le Sserafim feat. Aliyah's Interlude	Pureflow Pt. 1	Yes	Yes	No
"Irony"	2026	Le Sserafim	Pureflow Pt. 1	Yes	Yes	No
"Trust Exercise"	2026	Le Sserafim	Pureflow Pt. 1	Yes	Yes	No
"Liminal Space"	2026	Le Sserafim	Pureflow Pt. 1	No	Yes	No

== Videography ==
=== Music videos ===
List of music videos, showing year released, and name of the director(s)
Title	Year	Director(s)	Ref.
"Raise Y_our Glass"	2022	Geeeembo	
"I ≠ Doll"	2023	Hybe / Source Music	
"Love You Twice" (피어나도록)	2023	Hybe / Source Music	
"Blessing in disguise"	2023	Geeeembo	
"Jellyfish" (해파리)	2025	Unknown	

== Filmography ==
=== Television shows ===
Year	Title	Role	Notes	Ref.
2018	Produce 48	Contestant	Placed 26th	

=== Web shows ===
Year	Title	Role	Notes	Ref.
2025	Real Real Jinzuha Trip	Host	With Kazuha	

== Awards and nominations ==
Name of the award ceremony, year presented, award category, nominee(s) and the result of the award
Award ceremony	Year	Category	Nominee/work	Result	Ref.
MAMA Awards	2024	Best Collaboration	Groovy Room – "Yes or No" (feat. Huh Yunjin & Crush)	Nominated	
MAMA Awards	2024	Song of the Year	Groovy Room – "Yes or No" (feat. Huh Yunjin & Crush)	Longlisted	

== Other accolades ==
=== Listicles ===
Name of publisher, year listed, name of listicle, and placement
Publisher	Year	Listicle	Placement	Ref.
Variety	2026	Power of Young Hollywood	Placed	
