= Eve, Psyche & the Bluebeard's Wife =

- English version cover

Single by Le Sserafim

from the album Unforgiven
- Released: May 23, 2023
- Studio: DCH Studios (Tokyo, Japan); HYBE Studios (Seoul, South Korea)
- Genre: Baltimore Club; K-Pop; Jersey Club
- Length: 3:05
- Label: Source; YG Plus
- Songwriters: Score (13); Megatone (13); "Hitman" Bang; Supreme Boi; Maia Wright; Max Thulin; Benjmn; Gusten Dahlqvist; Arineh Karimi; Huh Yunjin; Lee Hyung-seok (PNP); Danke
- Producer: 13

Le Sserafim singles chronology
"Unforgiven" (2023)	"Eve, Psyche & the Bluebeard's Wife" (2023)	"Perfect Night" (2023)

Demi Lovato singles chronology
"Swine" (2023)	"Eve, Psyche & the Bluebeard's Wife" (remix) (2023)	"Penhasco2" (2023)

Rina Sawayama singles chronology
"Frankenstein" (2022)	"Eve, Psyche & the Bluebeard's Wife" (remix) (2023)	"Kiss Me" (2023)

Music video
- "Eve, Psyche & the Bluebeard's Wife" on YouTube

"Eve, Psyche & the Bluebeard's Wife" (Korean: 이브, 프시케 그리고 푸른 수염의 아내; RR: Ibeu, Peusike geurigo Pureun Suyeomui anae) is a song by the South Korean girl group Le Sserafim. It was released on May 23, 2023, as the second single from their debut studio album, Unforgiven. It is a Jersey club song that addresses themes of girl power, self-empowerment, and breaking taboos. The release of its music video, which features the members of Le Sserafim dancing and playing children's games, prompted an increase in attention for the song; it peaked at number two on the Circle Digital Chart in South Korea the following month.

Various versions of the song were released: a remix featuring singer Bibi and rappers Mirani and Camo on June 27, 2023; an English version on July 6, 2023; a remix featuring singer Upsahl on July 14, 2023; a remix featuring Japanese-British singer Rina Sawayama on July 28, 2023; and a version featuring American singer-songwriter Demi Lovato on August 4, 2023.

== Release, music video, and remixes ==
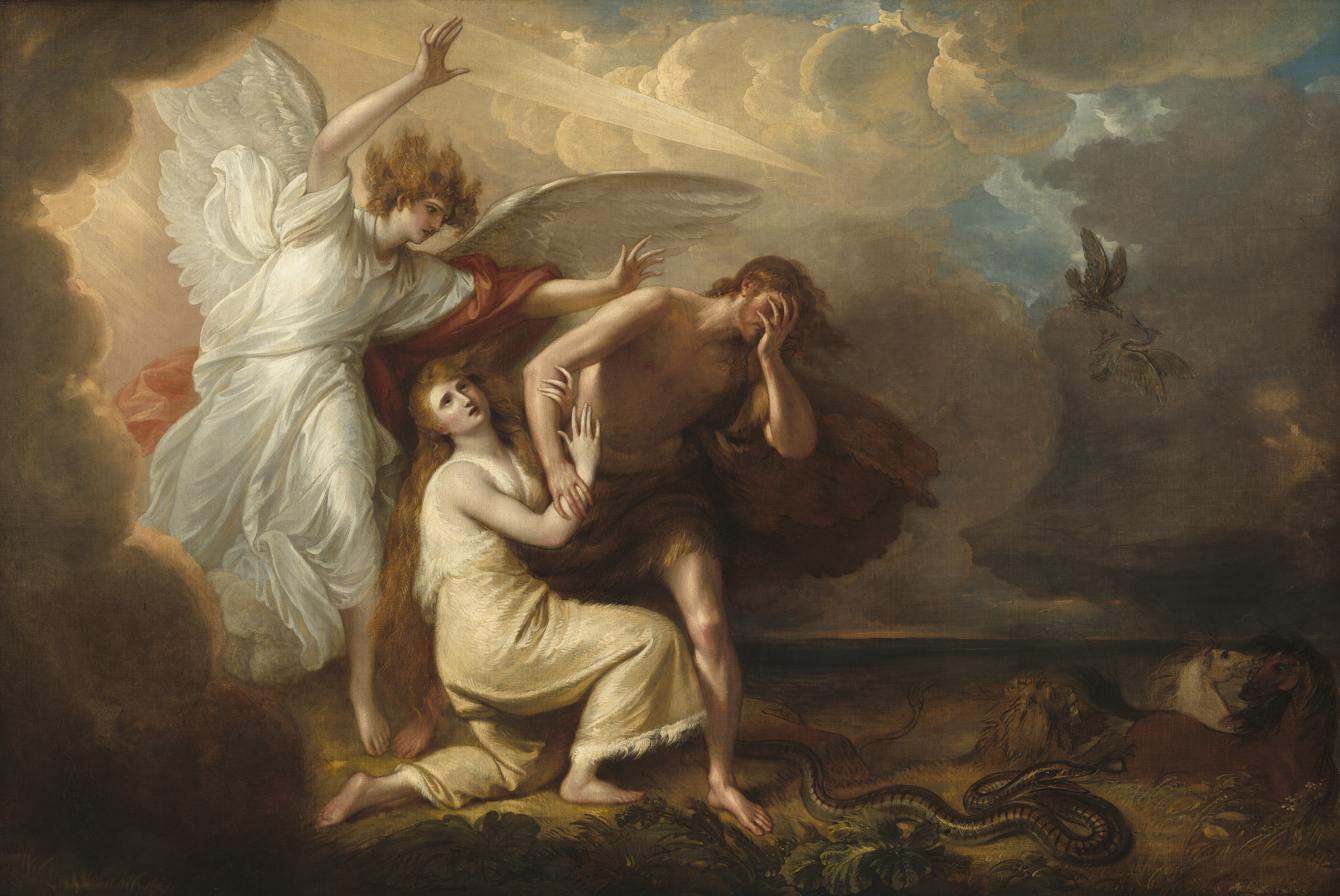
Benjamin West's 1791 painting The Expulsion of Adam and Eve from Paradise is featured in the music video for "Eve, Psyche and the Bluebeard's Wife".

"Eve, Psyche and the Bluebeard's Wife" was included on Le Sserafim's debut studio album, Unforgiven, which was released on May 1, 2023. It was written by Score and Megatone, both members of the production collective 13; Hybe Corporation founder Bang Si-hyuk; rapper Supreme Boi; Maia Wright; Max Thulin; Benjmn; Gusten Dahlqvist; Arineh Karimi; Le Sserafim member Huh Yunjin; Lee Hyung-seok (PNP); and Danke. A teaser for the music video of "Eve, Psyche and the Bluebeard's Wife" was released on May 22, 2023, while the music video itself was released on May 24, 2023. It features the group doing intricate dance moves and playing children's games, such as rock paper scissors and red light, green light, with a group of rollerskating boys. The 1791 painting The Expulsion of Adam and Eve from Paradise by American painter Benjamin West is also featured in the video. To promote the song, Le Sserafim performed it on various South Korean music shows, including on M Countdown on May 25.

A YouTube Short featuring South Korean singer Bibi rapping a verse on the song was posted to the group's YouTube account on June 20, and a remix for the song featuring Bibi with South Korean rappers Mirani and Camo was uploaded to the group's SoundCloud account on June 27, 2023. The instrumental track of the song was also posted to Le Sserafim's social media accounts on June 20 as part of their "Eve, Psyche, and _" social media campaign, which encouraged fans to upload their own verses to the song over the instrumental.

An English version of the song was released on July 6, 2023, followed by remixes featuring American singer Upsahl on July 14 and Japanese-British singer Rina Sawayama on July 28. A new version featuring American singer-songwriter Demi Lovato was released on August 4.

== Composition ==
"Eve, Psyche and the Bluebeard's Wife" is an uptempo K-pop and Jersey club song with a "classic" 1990s-inspired electro beat. Its lyrics, such as "Fearless, say yes, we don't dress to impress", cover themes of self-empowerment and breaking away from stereotypes and taboos. Its title uses the names of Eve, a biblical figure who ate the forbidden fruit, Psyche, the Greek goddess of the soul who watched Cupid while he slept to see his true form, and Bluebeard's wife, a character in the French fairy tale "Bluebeard" written by Charles Perrault who marries a man whose wives kept disappearing and whose family defeats him and takes his fortune, to emphasize the song's message of breaking taboos.

== Critical reception ==
The song was subject to positive reviews from music critics. It was described by Crystal Bell of Nylon as one of several "girl-power anthems with sophisticated themes" from Unforgiven. Sara Delgado of Dazed called the song a standout track from the album, while Taylor Glasby from the same publication named it one of the 50 best K-pop tracks of the year. Business Insider ranked it number 5 in their list of the best K-pop songs of 2023, calling it a "rare B-side that completely superseded its accompanying single".

NME included the song at number 32 on their year-end list of the 50 best songs of 2023. Billboard ranked the song number 6 in their list of the 25 Best K-pop Songs of 2023, praising the group's vocal delivery and the track's production. Music webzine Music Y ranked it number five in their ranking of the 10 best songs of 2023.

== Commercial performance ==
In South Korea, "Eve, Psyche and the Bluebeard's Wife" entered the Circle Chart at number 121 on May 1, 2023, upon the release of Unforgiven before promptly going down on the chart in the following weeks. After the release of its music video, it entered the chart's top-100 for the week dated May 24, 2023, and rose to number 34 the following week. It peaked at number two for the week dated June 25, 2023.

== Accolades ==
"Eve, Psyche & the Bluebeard's Wife" received one music program award on Inkigayo on July 16, 2023, winning against Ive's "Kitsch" and Aespa's "Spicy".

== Credits and personnel ==
Adapted from the album liner notes.

- Le Sserafim – vocals
- Score (13) – production, keyboards, drums, digital editing, vocal arrangement
- Megatone (13) – production, bass, drums, digital editing, vocal arrangement
- Kim Jun-yeong – digital editing
- Arineh Karimi – background vocals
- Young Chance – background vocals
- Belle – background vocals
- Feli Ferraro – background vocals
- James F. Reynolds – mix engineering
- Lee Yeon-soo – engineering
- James Cunningham – mix engineering assistance
- Chris Gehringer – mastering

== Charts ==
=== Weekly charts ===
Weekly chart performance for "Eve, Psyche and the Bluebeard's Wife"
Chart (2023)	Peak position
Global 200 (Billboard)	66
Japan Hot 100 (Billboard)	22
Japan Combined Singles (Oricon)	22
New Zealand Hot Singles (RMNZ)	28
Singapore Regional (RIAS)	15
South Korea (Circle)	2
US World Digital Song Sales (Billboard)	8

=== Monthly charts ===
Monthly chart performance for "Eve, Psyche and the Bluebeard's Wife"
Chart (2023)	Position
South Korea (Circle)	3

=== Year-end charts ===
2023 year-end chart performance for "Eve, Psyche & the Bluebird's Wife"
Chart (2023)	Position
Global Excl. US (Billboard)	177
South Korea (Circle)	18

2024 year-end chart performance for "Eve, Psyche & the Bluebeard's Wife"
Chart (2024)	Position
South Korea (Circle)	100

== Certifications ==
Certifications for "Eve, Psyche and the Bluebeard's Wife"
Region	Certification	Certified units/sales
Japan (RIAJ)	Platinum	100,000,000^{†}
South Korea (KMCA)	Platinum	100,000,000^{†}
^{†} Streaming-only figures based on certification alone.
