= Different (Le Sserafim song) =

- Digital cover

Single by Le Sserafim
- Language: Japanese; English
- B-side: "Kawaii"
- Released: June 9, 2025
- Genre: Disco-funk
- Length: 2:21
- Label: Source; Universal Japan
- Songwriters: Amanda "Kiddo AI" Ibanez; Score (13); Megatone (13); Tommy Brown; Steven Franks; Sunny; Canchild
- Producers: 13; Brown; Franks

Le Sserafim singles chronology
"Hot" (2025)	"Different" (2025)	"Spaghetti" (2025)

Le Sserafim Japanese singles chronology
"Crazy" (Japanese version) (2024)	"Different" (2025)

Music video
- "Different" on YouTube

"Different" is a song recorded by South Korean girl group Le Sserafim. It was released as the group's fourth Japanese single and first original Japanese single by Source Music and Universal Japan on June 9, 2025.

== Background and release ==
On April 24, 2025, Universal Music announced Le Sserafim's fourth Japanese single "Different", with pre-orders opening that same day. Two series of concept photos to promote the single were released from May 8 to 16, featuring two themes, Offbeat Clove and Nostalgic Ylang. The Offbeat Clove series features the members wearing rock-style outfits in a nighttime outdoor setting illuminated by street lights, while the Nostalgic Ylang series displays the members in a warmer environment with retro-style outfits. On May 26, sampler videos of the single's two original tracks were unveiled. "Different" was released digitally as a standalone track on June 9.

On June 12, Netflix announced that Le Sserafim will be releasing the song "Kawaii" as an original soundtrack for the animated Japanese series My Melody & Kuromi, which will be included in the single "Different". The song was briefly played in the trailer for the series, which was released concurrently. That same day, the English version of "Different" was released. The track listing was unveiled the following day, revealing the inclusion of the Japanese version of "Hot" in the single. The single was released digitally and on CD on June 24.

== Commercial performance ==
On the day of its physical release, "Different" topped the Oricon Daily Singles Chart. The song debuted at number 20 of the Billboard Japan Hot 100, before rising to and peaking at number 2 upon the single's physical release.

== Track listing ==
"Different" track listing
No.	Title	Writer(s)	Producer(s)	Length
1.	"Different"	Amanda "Kiddo A.I." Ibanez; Score (13); Megatone (13); Tommy Brown; Steven Franks; Sunny; Canchild	13; Brown; Franks	2:21
2.	"Hot" (Japanese version)	Jackson Shanks; Supreme Boi; Ali Tamposi; Feli Ferraro; Score (13); Megatone (13); "Hitman" Bang; Huh Yunjin	13; Shanks	2:23
3.	"Kawaii" (produced by Gen Hoshino)	Hoshino; Score (13); Megatone (13); Huh; Justin Reinstein; Morgan Kubes; Loar; Kanata Okajima; BB Elliot; Ikki; Okhan Uenver; Jonna Hall; Malin Christin; Ninos Hanna; Maya Rose; CX Lucas	Hoshino; 13	3:20
Total length:				8:04

"Different" (English version) track listing
No.	Title	Writer(s)	Producer(s)	Length
1.	"Different" (English version)	Ibanez; Score (13); Megatone (13); Brown; Franks; Huh	13; Brown; Franks	2:21

== Personnel ==
- Le Sserafim – vocals
- Score (13) – production, keyboard, drums, vocal arrangement; digital editing (1, 3)
- Megatone (13) – production, bass, guitar, vocal arrangement; digital editing (1, 3)
- Tommy Brown – production, bass, drums, guitar, keyboard (1)
- Mr. Franks – production, bass, drums, guitar, keyboard (1)
- Amanda "Kiddo A.I." Ibanez – background vocals (1)
- Jackson Shanks – production, guitar, synthesizer, drums (2)
- Gen Hoshino – bass, drums, keyboard, synthesizer (3)
- Kim Junhyuk – digital editing (2)
- Feli Ferraro – background vocals (2)
- Ikki – background vocals (3)
- John Hanes – mixing (1)
- Jongpil Gu – mixing (2–3)
- Rose Hong – mixing (3)
- Joe Laporta – mastering (1)
- Chris Gehringer – mastering (2–3)
- Wang Bok-yeong – recording engineering (1)
- Lee Dong-geun – recording engeineering (1, 3)
- Tak Hyun-gwan – recording engeineering (1)
- Hwang Min-hee – recording engeineering (1, 2)

== Charts ==
=== Weekly charts ===
Weekly chart performance for "Different"
Chart (2025)	Peak position
Japan (Japan Hot 100)	2
Japan (Oricon)	2
Japan Combined Singles (Oricon)	2
New Zealand Hot Singles (RMNZ)	34
Singapore Regional (RIAS)	19
South Korea Download (Circle)	85
US World Digital Song Sales (Billboard)	9

=== Monthly charts ===
Monthly chart performance for "Different"
Chart (2025)	Position
Japan (Oricon)	6

=== Year-end charts ===
Year-end chart performance for "Different"
Chart (2025)	Position
Japan Top Singles Sales (Billboard Japan)	55
Japan (Oricon)	50

== Certifications ==
Certifications for "Different"
Region	Certification	Certified units/sales
Japan (RIAJ) Physical	Gold	100,000^{^}
^{^} Shipments figures based on certification alone.

== Release history ==
Release history for "Different"
Region	Date	Format	Version	Label	Ref.
Various	June 9, 2025	Digital download; streaming	Original	Source; Universal Japan	
Various	June 13, 2025	Digital download; streaming	English	Source; Universal Japan	
Various	June 24, 2025	Digital download; streaming	Single	Source; Universal Japan	
Japan	June 24, 2025	CD	Single	Source; Universal Japan	
South Korea	June 24, 2025	CD	Single	Source	
