= Shay Latukolan =

Dutch choreographer

Shay Latukolan (born 12 July 1992) is a Dutch choreographer, dancer and director.

== Early life ==
Latukolan was born in Zwolle in the Netherlands. His biological father is Nigerian and his mother is a Moluccan Indonesian. His father who raised him was also Moluccan.

He became interested in dance when he was 13, cancelling soccer school in order to join breakdance lessons. He attended his first dance camp called 'StreetDanceCamp' in Brno, Czech Republic and eventually moved to Amsterdam when he was 16 to pursue his ambition further.

== Choreography ==
Latukolan choreographed British rapper Stormzy's music video for the track Vossi Bop. This was his first major work that brought him to the attention of other directors and producers.

He worked on the music video choreography for songs by the Spanish pop star Rosalía and British singer-songerwriter Ed Sheeran.

In 2023, he choreographed the single-take music videos for the album Volcano from the band Jungle. This included the video for the viral hit Back on 74 for which he won "Best Choreography in a Video" at the 2023 UK Music Video Awards. He got involved in the project because two of his friends Roché Apinsa and Ruben Chi were asked to choreograph the track "Good Times / Problemz". Latukolan was brought in as a movement director, as Apinsa and Chi were also dancers in the video. He was then asked to choreograph the remainder of the videos for the album.

In 2024, Latukolan provided the choreography for Donald Glover on the music video for "Little Foot Big Foot", directed by Hiro Murai.
