= Busy Earnin' =

Single by Jungle

from the album Jungle
- Released: 7 April 2014
- Genre: R&B, neo soul
- Length: 3:01
- Label: XL
- Songwriters: Josh Lloyd-Watson; Tom McFarland

Jungle singles chronology
"Platoon" (2013)	"Busy Earnin'" (2014)	"Time" (2014)

"Busy Earnin'" is a song by Jungle, released in 7 April 2014 as a single from their album Jungle. It peaked at number 19 on the UK Indie Chart, number 27 on Ultratop and number 118 on the French Singles Chart. The song was also used in the video games FIFA 15 and Forza Horizon 2, in the movie Lift (2024), the American TV show “Superstore” during the “Black Friday” Episode, in the Brooklyn Nine-Nine Episode "Jake and Sophia" and in the opening of Tales from the Borderlands video game.

== Background ==
"Busy Earnin'" is Jungle's third single from their eponymous debut album and was released digitally on 7 April 2014 and in vinyl format on 15 April on XL Recordings. It was premiered on Metropolis with Jason Bentley on KCRW, and details the circumstances of spending too much time making money.

== Chart performance ==
The song peaked at number 19 on the UK Indie Chart and at number 27 on the Ultratip chart in Belgian Flanders region in March, and at number 118 in France in July 2014.

== Music video ==
A music video was released onto YouTube on 28 February 2014. It was directed by JLW and Oliver Hadlee Pearch and features the large dance ensemble featured on the band's debut album performing a choreographed routine in a large warehouse caused to shake by the track, and follows the theme of the first two videos "Platoon" and "The Heat".

== Live performances ==
The song and "Time" from the song's parent album were performed on Jimmy Kimmel Live! on 16 June 2014, while both "Busy Earnin'" and the album track "Julia" were performed on Late Night with Seth Meyers.

== Accolades ==
"Busy Earnin'" was voted in at number 67 on the 2014 Triple J Hottest 100 countdown in Australia. It also appeared on NME's "Top 50 Tracks of 2014" at number 13.

== Charts ==
Chart performance for "Busy Earnin'"
Chart (2014)	Peak position
Australia (ARIA Hitseekers)	10
Belgium (Ultratip Bubbling Under Flanders)	27
France (SNEP)	118
Mexico Ingles Airplay (Billboard)	32
Netherlands (Single Tip)	2
Scottish Singles Sales (Official Charts)	86
UK Singles (OCC)	158
UK Independent (Official Charts)	19

== Certifications ==
Certifications for "Busy Earnin'"
Region	Certification	Certified units/sales
Canada (Music Canada)	Gold	40,000^{‡}
New Zealand (RMNZ)	Gold	15,000^{‡}
United Kingdom (BPI)	Platinum	600,000^{‡}
^{‡} Sales+streaming figures based on certification alone.
