= Sunshine (Jungle album) =

Studio album by Jungle
- Released: 14 August 2026
- Length: 32:39
- Labels: Caiola; AWAL
- Producers: J Lloyd; Lydia Kitto

Jungle chronology
Volcano (2023)	Sunshine (2026)

Singles from Sunshine
- 1. "Carry On" Released: 24 March 2026; 2. "The Wave" Released: 27 May 2026; 3. "Someday, Somewhere" Released: 8 July 2026; 4. "Sunshine" Released: 14 August 2026

Sunshine is the fifth studio album by the British neo soul band Jungle, released on 14 August 2026 via Caiola Records and AWAL. It marks the first release since longtime collaborator Lydia Kitto became an official member of the band.

== Release ==
On 24 March 2026, "Carry On" was released as a single after the band premiered it live on the radio station BBC Radio 1. After silence for two months, the band announced on Instagram the release of the album's second single, "The Wave". "The Wave" was released as a single on 27 May along with a music video, the song being described as drawing inspiration from Brazilian music of the 60s and 70s. "Someday, Somewhere" was released as the third single on 8 July along with a music video, with the song's meaning being of "holding onto that feeling that something better is coming". Lydia Kitto said while the music is happy, the lyrics can be perceived as happy or sad.

Sunshine was released on 14 August 2026 on streaming services, digipak CD, and vinyl in three colours: standard black, caramel, and amber and brown marble. The album cover follows the minimalist format of their previous artworks.

== Tour ==
Along with the announcement of the album, Jungle announced a tour for the album split across 2026 and 2027, covering North America, Europe, and Australia. The electronic duo Rio Kosta was confirmed as the opening act for the 2026 performances.

== Track listing ==
All tracks are written by Joshua Lloyd-Watson and Lydia Kitto, except where noted.

Sunshine track listing
No.	Title	Writer(s)	Length
1.	"Come Back to Me"		3:05
2.	"Sunshine"	Joshua Lloyd-Watson; Lydia Kitto; Thomas McFarland	3:11
3.	"Where Are You Now?"		3:08
4.	"Move Like You Do"		2:41
5.	"Romeo II" (featuring Bas)	Kitto; Lloyd-Watson; Abbas Hamad	3:03
6.	"Carry On"		2:49
7.	"The Wave"		3:23
8.	"Someday, Somewhere"		2:32
9.	"Natural"	Lloyd-Watson; Kitto; Billy Walsh	2:29
10.	"Reflection"	Lloyd-Watson; Kitto; McFarland	2:56
11.	"Heavy on My Soul"		3:22
Total length:			32:39

== Personnel ==
Credits are adapted from Tidal.

=== Jungle ===
- Josh Lloyd – production, engineering, mixing (all tracks); drum programming (tracks 1–4, 8–11), background vocals (1, 2, 7, 9-11), guitar (1, 3, 6–11), keyboards (1, 4, 6–11), bass guitar (1, 7, 9-11), lead vocals (3, 8), additional vocals (4)
- Tom McFarland – additional production (1–5, 8–11), background vocals (1, 11), lead vocals (3, 8)
- Lydia Kitto – lead vocals, production (all tracks); background vocals (1, 2), bass guitar (2–6, 8), keyboards (2-5, 8, 10, 11), guitar (3–6, 8, 11), engineering (4, 5, 11), string arrangement (6, 11), drums (10)

=== Additional contributors ===
- Matt Colton – mastering
- Ciaran De Chaud – engineering assistance (1-5)
- Jamie Lloyd-Taylor – drum machine (2, 4–8), sound design (2), engineering (5), production (5), additional production (6–8)
- Eric Hagstrom – drums (2, 3, 8)
- Rosie Danvers – string arrangement, conductor (2)
- Victoria Harild – cello (2)
- Emma Owens – viola (2)
- Meghan Cassidy – viola (2)
- Hayley Pomfrett – violin (2)
- Jenny Sacha – violin (2)
- Kerenza Peacock – violin (2)
- Patrick Kiernan – violin (2)
- Steve Morris – violin (2)
- Bas – lead vocals (5)
- Nicolas Flores – vocal engineering (5)
- Shaan Ramaprasad – arrangement, strings, string engineering (6, 11)
- Will Fry – percussion (11)

== Charts ==
Chart performance for Sunshine
Chart (2026)	Peak position
Australian Albums (ARIA)	9
Austrian Albums (Ö3 Austria)	12
Belgian Albums (Ultratop Flanders)	4
Belgian Albums (Ultratop Wallonia)	28
Danish Albums (Hitlisten)	35
Dutch Albums (Album Top 100)	5
French Albums (SNEP)	58
German Albums (Offizielle Top 100)	16
German Pop Albums (Offizielle Top 100)	8
Irish Albums (Official Charts)	41
Irish Independent Albums (IRMA)	5
Japanese Dance & Soul Albums (Oricon)	5
Lithuanian Albums (AGATA)	22
New Zealand Albums (RMNZ)	18
Polish Albums (ZPAV)	22
Portuguese Albums (AFP)	14
Spanish Albums (Promusicae)	25
Swedish Physical Albums (Sverigetopplistan)	11
Swiss Albums (Schweizer Hitparade)	13
UK Albums (Official Charts)	4
UK Independent Albums (Official Charts)	3
US Billboard 200	98
US Independent Albums (Billboard)	12
US Top Rock & Alternative Albums (Billboard)	30
