= Come Over (Le Sserafim song) =

- Remixes cover

Song by Le Sserafim

from the EP Hot
- Language: English
- Released: March 14, 2025
- Recorded: 2024
- Genre: Nu jazz; bossa nova
- Length: 2:17
- Label: Source; Geffen
- Songwriters: J Lloyd; Lydia Kitto; Score (13); Megatone (13)
- Producers: J Lloyd; Lydia Kitto; 13

Music video
- "Come Over" on YouTube

"Come Over" is a song by South Korean girl group Le Sserafim from their fifth extended play Hot (2025). It was released as the EP's third track by Source Music on March 14, 2025, and a music video for the song, made in partnership with Android, was released on March 31, 2025. A dreamy retro-sounding nu jazz and bossa nova track, the song was created in collaboration with the British band Jungle.

== Background and release ==
On February 16, 2025, Source Music announced that Le Sserafim would release their fifth extended play Hot on March 14. It was revealed that the British band Jungle had worked on the EP, saying that the group "adds a special charm to our production styles". The album trailer "Born Fire" was released on February 21, and track samplers for the EP were released on March 3. The tracklist was revealed on March 4, with J Lloyd and Lydia Kitto from Jungle confirmed to have co-written and produced "Come Over". The group recorded the song in Los Angeles the year prior, with Huh Yunjin saying that it was "amazing to see this whole thing come to life." The song was released along with the EP on March 14. Source Music announced on March 26 that a music video for "Come Over", made in collaboration with Android, would be released on March 31.

== Composition ==
"Come Over" was written and produced by J Lloyd and Lidya Kitto of Jungle, and Score and Megatone of the production collective 13. It is a dreamy retro-sounding nu jazz and bossa nova song with lyrics that are "flirty, carefree, and a tad sultry" about tempting a lover to release their inhibitions and dance with them. In an interview with NME, Le Sserafim member Huh Yunjin said that the "retro sound really blends into the concept of this album" and that Jungle's sound was a unique style for them to blend with. "Come Over" was composed in the key of E minor with a tempo of 156 beats per minute.

== Track listing ==
Digital download and streaming – Remixes

1. "Come Over" – 2:17
2. "Come Over" (Hyperpop remix) – 2:24
3. "Come Over" (Bossa Nova remix) – 2:34
4. "Come Over" (Funk remix) – 2:24
5. "Come Over" (Sped up version) – 1:49
6. "Come Over" (Slowed + reverb version) – 3:57
7. "Come Over" (Instrumental) – 2:17

== Personnel ==
Credits adapted from the EP liner notes.

- Le Sserafim – vocals
- J Lloyd – production, keyboards, guitar, drums, digital editing, recording engineering
- Lydia Kitto – production, keyboards, guitar, bass, background vocals, vocal arrangement
- Score (13) – production, keyboards, vocal arrangement
- Megatone (13) – production, bass, vocal arrangement
- Timothy Shaan – mixing
- Chris Gehringer – mastering
- Kim Min-jun – recording engineering
- Kim Hyun-soo – recording engineering

== Charts ==
=== Weekly charts ===
Weekly chart performance for "Come Over"
Chart (2025)	Peak position
Japan (Japan Hot 100)	57
Japan Digital Singles (Oricon)	38
Japan Streaming (Oricon)	49
New Zealand Hot Singles (RMNZ)	18
South Korea (Circle)	94

=== Monthly charts ===
Monthly chart performance for "Come Over"
Chart (2025)	Position
South Korea (Circle)	98

== Release history ==
Release history for "Come Over"
Region	Date	Format	Version	Label
Various	March 14, 2025	Digital download; streaming	Original	Source; Geffen
Various	March 31, 2025	Digital download; streaming	Remixes	Source; Geffen
