= For Ever (album) =

Studio album by Jungle
- Released: 14 September 2018
- Genres: Disco; neo soul; R&B; funk rock
- Length: 46:00
- Label: XL
- Producers: Inflo, J Lloyd, Tom McFarland

Jungle chronology
Jungle (2014)	For Ever (2018)	Loving in Stereo (2021)

Singles from For Ever
- 1. "House In LA" Released: 8 May 2018; 2. "Happy Man" Released: 8 May 2018; 3. "Cherry" Released: 22 July 2018; 4. "Heavy, California" Released: 26 July 2018; 5. "Beat 54 (All Good Now)" Released: 11 September 2018

For Ever is the second studio album by British neo soul band, Jungle. The album was released on 14 September 2018 through XL Recordings. It is their final release for XL Recordings before the formation of their own label, Caiola Records, in 2021.

== Critical reception ==
Professional ratings
Aggregate scores
Source	Rating
Metacritic	66/100
Review scores
Source	Rating
AllMusic	4/5 stars
Clash	6/10
DIY	3/5 stars
Dork	4/5 stars
Drowned in Sound	6/10
The Line of Best Fit	7.5/10
Loud and Quiet	6/10
NME	4/5 stars
Pitchfork	5/10
Rolling Stone	2.5/5 stars

For Ever was met with "generally favorable" reviews from critics. At Metacritic, which assigns a weighted average rating out of 100 to reviews from mainstream publications, this release received an average score of 66, based on 14 reviews.

== Track listing ==
For Ever track listing
No.	Title	Length
1.	"Smile"	3:07
2.	"Heavy, California"	3:05
3.	"Beat 54 (All Good Now)"	4:07
4.	"Cherry"	3:16
5.	"Happy Man"	3:12
6.	"Casio"	3:54
7.	"Mama Oh No"	3:17
8.	"House in LA"	4:44
9.	"Give Over"	3:33
10.	"Cosurmyne"	3:40
11.	"Home"	2:12
12.	"(More and More) It Ain't Easy"	3:12
13.	"Pray"	4:41
Total length:		46:00

No.	Title	Length
14.	"Overtrue" (Japan Bonus Track)	2:53
15.	"Come Back A Different Day" (Japan Bonus Track)	2:40
Total length:		49:38

== Personnel ==
Jungle

- Josh Lloyd-Watson – vocals, executive production, engineering, mixing, arrangement, creative direction, various instruments
- Tom McFarland – vocals, executive production, engineering, mixing, arrangement, creative direction, various instruments

Additional musicians

- Andro Cowperthwaite – vocals (1,3)
- George Day – drums (8)
- Rudi Salmon – vocals (1–5,7,8,10,13)
- Nat Zangi – vocals (7)
- Inflo – production (1–13), vocals (1–3,5-8,9,13)
- Nick Barr – viola (3,8,9,13)
- Zara Benyounes – violin (3,8,9,13)
- Meghan Cassidy – viola (3,8,9,13)
- Stephanie Cavey – violin (3,8,9,13)
- Anna Croad – violin (3,8,9,13)
- Rosie Danvers – cello, string arrangement (3,8,9,13)
- Eleanor Mathieson – violin (3,8,9,13)
- Wes Oakland – additional production (3,10), programming, guitar & bass (3,5,7,10)
- Hayley Pomfrett – violin (3,8,9,13)
- Holly Taylor – vocals (1)
- Melisa Young – vocals (6)

Technical personnel

- Alex Baranowski – string arrangement
- Tom Campbell – engineering assistant
- Matt Colton – mastering
- Joe Mortimer – design & layout
- Oliver Hadlee Pearch – photography
- Charlie Di Placido – creative direction
- Sam Wheat – string recording, engineering
- David Wrench – mixing

== Charts ==
Chart performance for For Ever
Chart (2018)	Peak position
Australian Albums (ARIA)	28
Belgian Albums (Ultratop Flanders)	13
Belgian Albums (Ultratop Wallonia)	87
Dutch Albums (Album Top 100)	34
French Albums (SNEP)	68
Portuguese Albums (AFP)	13
Spanish Albums (Promusicae)	85
Swiss Albums (Schweizer Hitparade)	22
UK Albums (Official Charts)	10
US Independent Albums (Billboard)	17
US Top Album Sales (Billboard)	56
US Top Alternative Albums (Billboard)	19
US Top Dance Albums (Billboard)	6
US Top Rock Albums (Billboard)	45
US Indie Store Album Sales (Billboard)	22
US Vinyl Albums (Billboard)	11

== Certifications ==
Certifications for For Ever
Region	Certification	Certified units/sales
Denmark (IFPI Danmark)	Gold	10,000^{‡}
United Kingdom (BPI)	Silver	60,000^{‡}
^{‡} Sales+streaming figures based on certification alone.
