= Back on 74 =

Single by Jungle

from the album Volcano
- Released: 28 July 2023
- Length: 3:29
- Label: Caiola; AWAL
- Songwriters: J Lloyd; Thomas McFarland; Lydia Kitto
- Producer: J Lloyd

Jungle singles chronology
"I've Been in Love" (2023)	"Back on 74" (2023)	"Let's Go Back" (2024)

Music video
- "Back on 74" on YouTube

"Back on 74" is a song by the British band Jungle, released as the fourth and final single from their album Volcano on 28 July 2023 through Caiola and AWAL. It was written by Jungle members Josh Lloyd and Thomas McFarland, as well as collaborator and touring member Lydia Kitto, who later that year became an official member of the group. The track was produced by Lloyd, with additional production by McFarland. It reached the top 40 in the UK and New Zealand. The track and its video went viral on TikTok in late 2023 and early 2024, which was also aided by a performance at the 2024 Brit Awards. The track was later nominated for the Best Contemporary Song Ivor Novello Award on Thursday 23 May 2024.

== Background ==
Josh Lloyd said the track was written about a fictional place where one grew up and has "fond memories" of: "74 is a fictitious thing, but for us it's like 74th Avenue or 74th Street or something, where, in your imagination or as a kid, you were playing out on the street. You've gone back to this place and it's giving you this really nostalgic feeling but everything's not quite the same."

== Music video ==
An interactive video for the song directed by Josh Lloyd and Charlie Di Placido was released in July 2023, which was released in standard form on YouTube the following month. The video was choreographed by the Dutch dancer Shay Latukolan.

== Charts ==
=== Weekly charts ===
Weekly chart performance for "Back on 74"
Chart (2023–2024)	Peak position
Australia (ARIA)	49
Australia Dance (ARIA)	5
Global 200 (Billboard)	127
Ireland (IRMA)	31
Lithuania (AGATA)	50
Netherlands (Single Top 100)	60
New Zealand (Recorded Music NZ)	31
Portugal (AFP)	165
Sweden Heatseeker (Sverigetopplistan)	11
Switzerland (Schweizer Hitparade)	70
UK Singles (Official Charts)	19
UK Indie (Official Charts)	2
US Bubbling Under Hot 100 (Billboard)	10
US Hot Dance/Electronic Songs (Billboard)	4
US Hot Rock & Alternative Songs (Billboard)	14

=== Year-end charts ===
2023 year-end chart performance for "Back on 74"
Chart (2023)	Position
US Hot Dance/Electronic Songs (Billboard)	45

2024 year-end chart performance for "Back on 74"
Chart (2024)	Position
Australia Dance (ARIA)	11
UK Singles (OCC)	89
US Hot Dance/Electronic Songs (Billboard)	16
US Hot Rock & Alternative Songs (Billboard)	72

== Popular culture ==
The song became a traversal emote in Fortnite Battle Royale in 2023.

== Certifications ==
Certifications for "Back on 74"
Region	Certification	Certified units/sales
Australia (ARIA)	Platinum	70,000^{‡}
Denmark (IFPI Danmark)	Gold	45,000^{‡}
France (SNEP)	Platinum	200,000^{‡}
Netherlands (NVPI)	Gold	46,500^{‡}
New Zealand (RMNZ)	Platinum	30,000^{‡}
Spain (Promusicae)	Gold	30,000^{‡}
United Kingdom (BPI)	Platinum	600,000^{‡}
United States (RIAA)	Platinum	1,000,000^{‡}
^{‡} Sales+streaming figures based on certification alone.
