= Loving in Stereo =

Studio album by Jungle
- Released: 13 August 2021
- Length: 40:02
- Labels: Caiola; AWAL
- Producers: J Lloyd, Tom McFarland

Jungle chronology
For Ever (2018)	Loving in Stereo (2021)	Volcano (2023)

Singles from Loving in Stereo
- 1. "Keep Moving" Released: 23 March 2021; 2. "Talk About It" Released: 2 June 2021; 3. "Romeo" Released: 6 July 2021; 4. "Truth" Released: 28 July 2021; 5. "All of the Time" Released: 10 August 2021

Loving in Stereo is the third studio album by British electronic band Jungle, released on 13 August 2021. It is their first release on their own independent label, Caiola Records, and is marketed and distributed by AWAL (a division of Sony Music).

Loving in Stereo was released three years after their second studio album, For Ever (2018), and is the group's first release to include featured artists, with guest appearances from American rapper Bas and Swiss-Tamil musician Priya Ragu respectively. The album was preceded by five singles: "Keep Moving", "Talk About It", "Romeo", "Truth", and "All of the Time".

== Background ==
Loving in Stereo comes three years after the band's second studio album, For Ever (2018). The album additionally marks the first time that Jungle have included featured collaborations on a release, with American rapper Bas and Swiss-Tamil musician Priya Ragu, respectively.

== Composition ==
The album as a whole discusses themes of "new beginnings, new love and fighting back against the odds". In an interview discussing the album, frontman Josh Lloyd-Watson stated:

"When we write music there's hope. Maybe today we'll create something that influences people and changes the way they feel. If you can make something that lifts people, that's an amazing feeling."

== Release ==
On 16 March 2021, Jungle premiered a trailer titled Loving in Stereo featuring a vignette of the dancers regularly associated with the collective from previous videos, performing in an abandoned compound or prison. At the time of the trailer's release, it was unclear whether the title was in reference to an upcoming album or a single. On 22 March, the duo confirmed Loving in Stereo would serve as the title of their third studio album, by way of the announcement of the album's first single, "Keep Moving" which premiered via Annie Mac's BBC Radio 1's Hottest Record in the World program on 23 March 2021. Loving in Stereo was released on 13 August 2021 through the group's own independent imprint, Caiola Records. It was made available on CD, LP, digital download, and streaming formats. A blue marbled edition of the album was additionally made available in selected international JB Hi-Fi stores.

== Critical reception ==
Professional ratings
Aggregate scores
Source	Rating
Metacritic	81/100
Review scores
Source	Rating
AllMusic	4/5 stars
Clash	7/10
DIY	4/5 stars
The Line of Best Fit	9/10
NME	4/5 stars
The Observer	3/5 stars
PopMatters	9/10
The Skinny	3/5 stars

At Metacritic, which assigns a normalized rating out of 100 to reviews from professional publications, Loving in Stereo received an average score of 81 based on 11 reviews, indicating "universal acclaim".

== Promotion ==
=== Singles ===
"Keep Moving" was released on 23 March 2021 as the album's lead single. It was premiered on Annie Mac's Hottest Record in the World program on BBC Radio 1.

"Talk About It" was released on 2 June 2021 as the second single. It was premiered the same way as its predecessor, on Annie Mac's Hottest Record in the World program.

"Romeo", featuring American rapper Bas, was released on 6 July 2021 as the third single. "Romeo" marked the duo's first single with a featured artist.

=== Tour ===
Alongside the album's announcement, the band additionally released details of an upcoming worldwide tour, which began in September 2021.

== Track listing ==
All tracks are produced by J Lloyd, except "Can't Stop the Stars", produced by J Lloyd and Tom McFarland.

Loving in Stereo track listing
No.	Title	Writer(s)	Length
1.	"Dry Your Tears"	Josh Lloyd-Watson; Tom McFarland; Dean "Inflo" Josiah Cover	1:20
2.	"Keep Moving"	Lloyd-Watson; McFarland; Lydia Kitto	4:00
3.	"All of the Time"	Lloyd-Watson; McFarland; George Day; Jamie Lloyd-Taylor; Laurence Hammerton; Kitto	3:02
4.	"Romeo" (featuring Bas)	Lloyd-Watson; McFarland; Taylor; Abbas Hamad; Ronald McCoy	2:46
5.	"Lifting You"	Lloyd-Watson; McFarland; Kitto	2:46
6.	"Bonnie Hill"	Lloyd-Watson; McFarland; Cover; Andrew Wyatt	3:11
7.	"Fire"	Lloyd-Watson; Lloyd-Taylor	2:45
8.	"Talk About It"	Lloyd-Watson; McFarland; Cover	3:24
9.	"No Rules"	Lloyd-Watson; McFarland	2:25
10.	"Truth"	Lloyd-Watson; McFarland	2:51
11.	"What D'You Know About Me?"	Lloyd-Watson; McFarland; Kitto	2:49
12.	"Just Fly, Don't Worry"	Lloyd-Watson; McFarland	1:48
13.	"Goodbye My Love" (featuring Priya Ragu)	Lloyd-Watson; Priya Ragupathylingam	3:14
14.	"Can't Stop the Stars"	Lloyd-Watson; McFarland; Lloyd-Taylor; Dominic Whalley	3:41
Total length:			40:02

Japanese edition bonus tracks
No.	Title	Length
15.	"Don't You Cry Now"
16.	"7AM"

=== Notes ===
- "Romeo" incorporates an interpolation of "I Love You More", written by Ronald McCoy and performed by Lee Williams & the Cymbals.

== Personnel ==
Jungle

- Josh Lloyd-Watson – writing, executive production, engineering, mixing, arrangement, (all tracks), cover design, vocals (all tracks), guitar (5, 6, 9–12), bass guitar (2, 3, 5, 7–10, 12, 13), keyboards and synths (1–3, 5–13), drum programming (2, 3, 5–12, 14), vibraphone (3, 5), organs (9), drums (13)
- Tom McFarland – writing (all tracks except 7 and 13), production (14) executive production, engineering, mixing, arrangement, vocals (all tracks except 7 and 13), keys & synths (10, 12, 13), drum programming (10)

Additional musicians

- Andro Cowperthwaite – vocals (1, 2, 7, 8, 11)
- George Day – writing (3), drums (2, 3, 14)
- Lydia Kitto – writing (2, 3, 5, 11), vocals (1–3, 5–8, 11, 12, 14), bass (11), synths (11)
- Rudi Salmon – vocals (1, 2, 7, 8, 11, 14)
- Andreya Triana – vocals (1, 2, 7, 8, 11, 14)
- Dominic Whalley – writing, bass, piano, drums, percussion (14)
- Bas – writing, vocals (4)
- Priya Ragu – writing, vocals (13)
- Corrine Bailey – French horn (6, 7, 11, 14)
- Nick Barr – viola (1, 2, 6, 8, 14)
- Luke Bowman – guitar (10)
- Rossetta Carr – vocals (3)
- Meghan Cassidy – viola (1, 2, 6, 8, 14)
- Stephanie Cavey – violin (1, 2, 6, 8, 14)
- Miranda Chambers – vocals (1–3, 6–8, 11, 14)
- Dean "Inflo" Josiah Cover – writing (1, 6, 8), production (1), vocals (1, 6, 8, 14), drums (8)
- Rosie Danvers – string arrangement, cello (1, 2, 5, 6, 8, 14), brass arrangement (6, 11)
- Louis Dowdeswell – trumpet (6, 7, 11, 14)
- Tim Ellis – French horn (6, 7, 11, 14)
- Zehra Güler – vocals (2, 3, 7, 8, 11, 14)
- Laurence Hammerton – writing, guitar (3)
- Fergus Ireland – bass (3)
- Sally Jackson – violin (1, 2, 6, 8, 14)
- Bryony James – cello (1, 2, 6, 8, 14)
- Patrick Kiernan – violin (1, 2, 5, 6, 8, 14)
- Mike Lovatt – trumpet (6, 7, 11, 14)
- Trevor Mires – trombone (6, 7, 14)
- Phillip Morris – French horn (6, 7, 11, 14)
- Rae Morris – vocals (1, 2, 7, 8, 11, 14)
- Steve Morris – violin (1, 2, 6, 8, 14)
- Hayley Pomfrett – violin (1, 2, 5, 6, 8, 14)
- Kotono Sato – violin (1, 2, 6, 8, 14)
- Sara Sexton – violin (1, 2, 6, 8, 14)
- Ellie Stanford – violin (1, 2, 5, 6, 8, 14)
- Dave Stewart – trombone (6, 7, 14)
- Holly Taylor – vocals (1, 2, 7, 8, 11, 14)
- Jamie Lloyd-Taylor – writing, production (3, 4), guitar, bass (4), drum programming (4), vocals (7)
- Chloe Vincent – flute (2, 6, 8, 14)
- Junior Williams – vocals (1, 2, 6–8, 11, 14)
- Martin Williams – flute (6), saxophone (6, 7, 14), brass arrangement (14)
- Andrew Wyatt – writing, bass, piano (6)

Technical personnel

- Barni Barnicott – mixing (8)
- Matt Colton – mastering
- Chloe Kraemer – engineering assistant
- Ben Loveland – engineering
- Luke Pickering – engineering
- Charlie Di Placido – creative director, executive production
- Tucan – mixing (2–7, 9–14)
- Tom Sandford – graphic design

== Charts ==
Chart performance for Loving in Stereo
Chart (2021)	Peak position
Australian Albums (ARIA)	10
Austrian Albums (Ö3 Austria)	47
Belgian Albums (Ultratop Flanders)	5
Belgian Albums (Ultratop Wallonia)	18
Dutch Albums (Album Top 100)	11
French Albums (SNEP)	55
German Albums (Offizielle Top 100)	18
Irish Albums (Official Charts)	16
Lithuanian Albums (AGATA)	18
Portuguese Albums (AFP)	13
Scottish Albums (Official Charts)	2
Spanish Albums (Promusicae)	33
Swiss Albums (Schweizer Hitparade)	8
UK Albums (Official Charts)	3
UK Independent Albums (Official Charts)	1
US Billboard 200	159
US Independent Albums (Billboard)	16
US Top Alternative Albums (Billboard)	15
US Top Dance Albums (Billboard)	1
US Top Rock Albums (Billboard)	30

== Release history ==
Release history and details for Loving in Stereo
Region	Date	Format	Edition	Label	Catalogue	Ref.
Various	13 August 2021	Digital download; streaming	Standard	Caiola	Not applicable	
Australia	13 August 2021	CD	Standard	AWAL	CAI001CD	
New Zealand	13 August 2021	CD	Standard	AWAL	CAI001CD	
Australia	13 August 2021	LP	Standard	AWAL	CAI001LP	
New Zealand	13 August 2021	LP	Standard	AWAL	CAI001LP	
Australia	13 August 2021	LP	Blue marbled edition	AWAL	CAI001LPIND	
New Zealand	13 August 2021	LP	Blue marbled edition	AWAL	CAI001LPIND	
