= Jungle (Jungle album) =

Studio album by Jungle
- Released: 14 July 2014
- Genres: Nu-disco; disco; neo soul; funk; soul
- Length: 39:06
- Label: XL Recordings
- Producer: Jungle

Jungle chronology
Jungle (2014)	For Ever (2018)

Singles from Jungle
- 1. "Platoon" Released: 16 December 2013; 2. "The Heat" Released: 16 December 2013; 3. "Busy Earnin'" Released: 7 April 2014; 4. "Time" Released: 8 September 2014

Jungle is the debut studio album by London-based modern musical collective Jungle. It was released on 14 July 2014 through XL Recordings. A nu-disco, disco, and funk album, Jungle combines musical influences from the 1970s, 1980s and 2010s into a sunny sound flavoured by soul and funk and the group's processed falsetto vocals, which were treated with modulation and Leslie speaker effects. Some songs also feature found sounds.

On release, the album received generally favourable reviews from music critics. Some highlighted the album's optimistic music, while others felt the record was too slick and unvaried to work as a sustained listening experience. Some reviewers noted a darker undercurrent to some songs, inspired by the duo's inner-city lives. In September 2014, the album was shortlisted for the 2014 Mercury Prize.

== Promotion ==
Formed in 2013, the identities of Jungle's were originally kept secret, in order to place an aesthetic emphasis on the music's surrounding artwork and videos. Instead, the duo of Josh Lloyd-Watson and Tom McFarland identified as J and T, respectively. The pair had revealed their true names by the release of Jungle.

"Platoon" and "The Heat" were digitally released as the lead singles promoting the album on 16 December 2013. The music video for "Platoon", which premiered on 4 June 2013, featured a 6-year-old B-girl named Terra, while the video for "The Heat" featured British skate crew High Rollaz and was released on 1 October 2013. Both videos were directed by Oliver Hadlee Pearch.

On 28 February 2014, a music video for the third single, "Busy Earnin'", was released onto YouTube. The single was released digitally on 7 April 2014, and in vinyl format on 15 April. The song peaked at number 19 on the UK Indie Chart and at number 27 on Ultratip chart in Belgian Flanders region in March, and at number 118 in France in July 2014.

A music video for the fourth single, "Time", was released on 8 July 2014. On 8 September, remixes of the song by Joe Goddard and LXURY were released onto iTunes.

== Composition ==
Jungle has been described as an album of nu-disco, and disco-funk, with songs characterised by "pliant" bass, 4/4 beats and "spindling guitar", underpinned by synth parts that are variously lush and airy. Among reviewers, Jim Carroll says that the record contains "shuffling funk, disco and soul", with influences from Talking Heads, Prince and Happy Mondays, while Andy Beta wrote the album favours "the bantamweight soul" of early 1980s British groups such as Imagination, I-Level, Fun Boy Three and Fine Young Cannibals. Josh Terry notes that the album combines elements from 1970s and 2010s music. Throughout the record, the group incorporate falsetto harmonies that have been compared to disco-era Bee Gees, albeit processed to sound somewhat "robotic". Some songs feature "distorted steel drums, tropical crackles and washes of sparkling-surf synth."

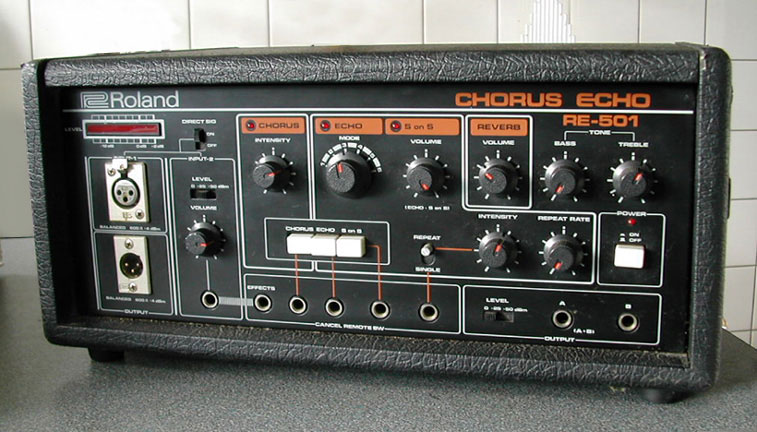
The Roland RE-501 Chorus Echo, used for the album's analogue distortion

The duo sought a somewhat murky sound for the record, inspired by "leftfield hip-hop producers such as J Dilla and Madvillain". To achieve this, they resampled their own performances to make them appear as though they were taken from "dusty old records". According to Lloyd-Watson, "We had various versions of songs that we kind of made cuts and edits of, so they start to sound like sampled loops. We're always going between high fidelity and low fidelity." Lloyd-Watson also noted that the duo used the Roland RE-501 Chorus Echo for analogue distortion. According to Sound on Sound writer Tom Doyle, Jungle's songs profile multiple vocal tracks by the duo which are processed through modulation and Leslie speaker effects.

Alongside the prioritisation of grooves and melody, many songs on Jungle feature unusual found sound effects, including police sirens on "The Heat" and a creaking door on "Drops", which were often captured by the group while on tour. The album's mixer, David Wrench, considered these sounds important to the record's style, elaborating: "it's like modern musique concrete. Jungle were in hotel rooms banging baths to make drum tracks." According to Lloyd-Watson, these sounds emerged because the duo use "what's available" when recording, adding: "if you're in a room in Paris and you haven't got any shakers, you'll end up getting some Euros and throwing them in a sink and miking that up. On 'The Heat', the snare drum’s made out of footsteps on gravel. We really love the idea of Foley in music. A football hitting the bedroom floor being a bass drum. You could go and record a '62 vintage Ludwig kick drum, but a lot of other people have access to that."

"The Heat", a "falsetto space funk" song, combines mentions of temperature and sexual 'heat' with the sampled police siren to feature "three separate 'heat' references in under 10 seconds." "Accelerate" features flourishes of chillwave, and has been described as containing "Tears for Fears-go-tropical undulations". "Drops" combines the creaking door sounds with a "minimal, James Blake-esque" sound. "Time" has a funk bassline reminiscent of Parliament, while the noir-esque "Smoking Pixels" is the record's sole instrumental. "Julia" is an 1980s-style synth-pop song.

== Critical reception ==
Professional ratings
Aggregate scores
Source	Rating
AnyDecentMusic?	7.1/10
Metacritic	72/100
Review scores
Source	Rating
AllMusic	3.5/5 stars
The A.V. Club	B−
The Guardian	3/5 stars
The Independent	4/5 stars
The Irish Times	4/5 stars
Mojo	4/5 stars
NME	8/10
The Observer	4/5 stars
Pitchfork	6.2/10
Uncut	6/10

Upon its release, Jungle received positive reviews from music critics. At Metacritic, which assigns a normalised rating out of 100 to reviews from mainstream critics, the album received an average score of 72, based on 21 reviews.

For AllMusic, Fred Thomas wrote that Jungle is "to be taken as a complete statement, and one that seems to reveal its nuances with repeat listens", adding that the identities and backgrounds of the band members "quickly become extraneous in light of the wealth of intriguing sounds presented on this incredibly well-constructed debut." Jim Carroll of The Irish Times believed it to be a record of "future-funk party favourites" that works well on repeat, praising the album's sunny pop grooves and noting: "When the sounds are this vibrant, it doesn't matter a jot who the Junglists actually are". He also highlighted the "intriguing darker side" to some of the songs, informed by the duo's inner-city lives.

Mark Beaumont of NME drew attention to the record's "ultra-modern rewiring of funk" for Generation Y, deeming it "the pop-art album of summer." Like Carroll, Beaumont noted that the album's "darker side" is "really intriguing", writing: "There's a tone of inner-city malaise, romantic ruin and psychedelic alienation to a raft of its tracks that speaks to those modern urbanites feeling screen-wiped and robbed of opportunities, busy earnin’ for nothing. It’s the sound of a 21st Century What's Going On, a sister-piece to Bobby Womack's Albarn-produced The Bravest Man in the Universe". Kitty Empire of The Observer described Jungle as a classy, accomplished album of "aerated disco-funk" that follows the promise of the duo's earlier singles, adding: "It all runs very smoothly – perhaps too smoothly for some tastes – but listen past the sheen and the headphone goods are there."

In The Guardian, Paul MacInnes felt that the songs work individually, but that the whole album becomes predictable, adding that "the faint, faded vocals, which at first intrigued – are they those of a wounded lover, or just a jaded observer? – now sound affected", and concluding that, "by deliberately creating a sense of mystery around themselves, Jungle may have raised expectations that their music cannot yet deliver on." Nick Coleman of The Independent similarly argued that the duo "should have cultivated the mystique some more, because their heat-haze hybrid of soul grooves and falsetto-funk chic feels too under-cooked to sustain a whole album", noting that much of the record "dissolves into a vague dissolves into a vague chill-out-zone drift". However, he praised songs such as "Busy Earnin'" and "Accelerate" for engagingly combing "summery uplift with a reflective tug".

Andy Beta of Pitchfork considered Jungle to work better as individual singles than an entire album, considering the "shimmering surface" to "belie the flimsiness of the songs themselves, which buckle under any sort of weight". He also noted that the group's "falsetto-castrato harmonies—just beyond the range of Pharrell—that deliver each chorus and hook" prove tiring, making the album feel longer than its 39-minute length. Josh Terry of The A.V. Club wrote that the album is competent and contains great singles, but added that besides "a smattering of strong tracks", the record is ultimately "too sleek and too wrapped in its own crate-digging influences to be more than an agreeable summer album."

== Track listing ==
All tracks are written by Jungle (Tom McFarland and Josh Lloyd-Watson).

No.	Title	Length
1.	"The Heat"	3:16
2.	"Accelerate"	3:04
3.	"Busy Earnin'"	3:01
4.	"Platoon"	3:12
5.	"Drops"	2:53
6.	"Time"	3:33
7.	"Smoking Pixels"	1:47
8.	"Julia"	3:15
9.	"Crumbler"	3:02
10.	"Son of a Gun"	3:28
11.	"Lucky I Got What I Want"	4:16
12.	"Lemonade Lake"	4:19
Total length:		39:06

No.	Title	Length
13.	"Quick Winnings" (Japan Bonus Track)	1:13
14.	"Teenage" (Japan Bonus Track)	3:46
Total length:		44:05

== Personnel ==
Jungle

- Josh Lloyd-Watson
- Tom McFarland

Additional musicians

- Rudi Salmon – vocals (2, 3, 8, 10)
- Fraser Maccoll – guitar (8)
- Dominic Whalley – percussion (8)
- George Day – drums (8)

Additional personnel

- Jungle – design, production
- David Wrench – mixing
- Mandy Parnell – mastering
- Imran Ahmed – A&R
- Phil Lee – design
- Oliver Hadlee Pearch – photography

== Charts ==
=== Weekly charts ===
Weekly chart performance for Jungle
Chart (2014)	Peak position
Australian Albums (ARIA)	20
Belgian Albums (Ultratop Flanders)	21
Belgian Albums (Ultratop Wallonia)	38
Danish Albums (Hitlisten)	28
Dutch Albums (Album Top 100)	42
French Albums (SNEP)	42
German Albums (Offizielle Top 100)	43
New Zealand Albums (RMNZ)	34
Scottish Albums (Official Charts)	25
Swiss Albums (Schweizer Hitparade)	22
UK Albums (Official Charts)	7
UK Independent Albums (Official Charts)	1
US Billboard 200	84

=== Year-end charts ===
Year-end chart performance for Jungle
Chart (2014)	Position
Belgian Albums (Ultratop Flanders)	163

== Certifications ==
Certifications for Jungle
Region	Certification	Certified units/sales
Denmark (IFPI Danmark)	Gold	10,000^{‡}
United Kingdom (BPI)	Gold	100,000^{*}
^{*} Sales figures based on certification alone.^{‡} Sales+streaming figures based on certification alone.
