= Jungle (band) =

English modern soul band

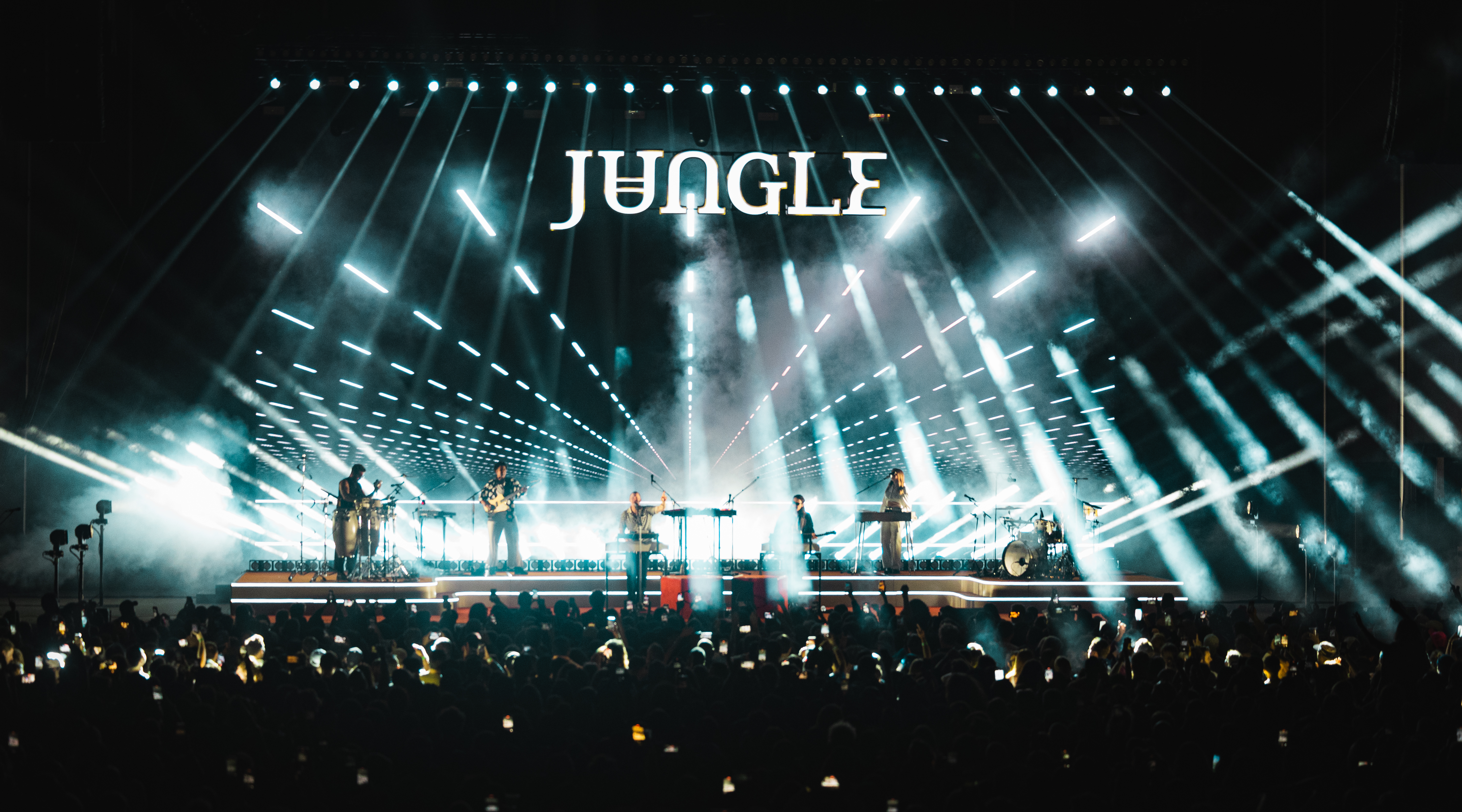
- Jungle performing in New York in 2023

Background information
- Origin: London, England
- Genres: Neo soul; funk; nu-disco; dance
- Years active: 2013–present
- Labels: Caiola; AWAL; XL
- Members: Josh Lloyd-Watson; Tom McFarland; Lydia Kitto
- Website: junglejunglejungle.com

Jungle are a British band formed in early 2013 by London-based producers Josh Lloyd-Watson and Tom McFarland. Jungle have released five studio albums: Jungle (2014), which was shortlisted for the Mercury Prize; For Ever (2018); Loving in Stereo (2021); Volcano (2023); and Sunshine (2026). The first two albums were released through XL Recordings while the latter three via their independent label Caiola Records.

In late 2023, having worked as a main musical contributor on Loving in Stereo, and co-writing every track with founding member J Lloyd on the album Volcano, it became official that Lydia Kitto joined Lloyd-Watson and McFarland as a full-time member after their BRIT nomination for Group of the Year.

== Background ==
Jungle were founded in 2013 by Josh Lloyd-Watson and Tom McFarland, who had been friends since they were nine years old and lived next door to each other in Shepherd's Bush, London. They were both educated at the Latymer Upper School in London. Originally the pair were part of the short-lived shoegaze band Born Blonde, which released an album, What The Desert Taught You, in 2012. They went on to form Jungle at the beginning of 2013, choosing to put an aesthetic emphasis on the music's surrounding artwork and videos, and not on the pair's own identity. Initially hiding their names and faces, Josh Lloyd-Watson and Tom McFarland came to be known as J and T. Over the course of the following year, Jungle evolved into a collective by working with different artists across diverse disciplines. To perform the music live, Jungle expanded to a seven-piece band, fronted by J and T. The pair wished to challenge themselves, resisting the temptation to simply re-produce their music from their laptops, and instead translated their songs into a full and organic live experience. J and T have explained that Jungle stemmed from a desire for 'honesty… true connection and friendship. It's about being in a collective and collective energy… [a] team spirit.'

== Musical career ==
=== 2013–2018: Jungle ===
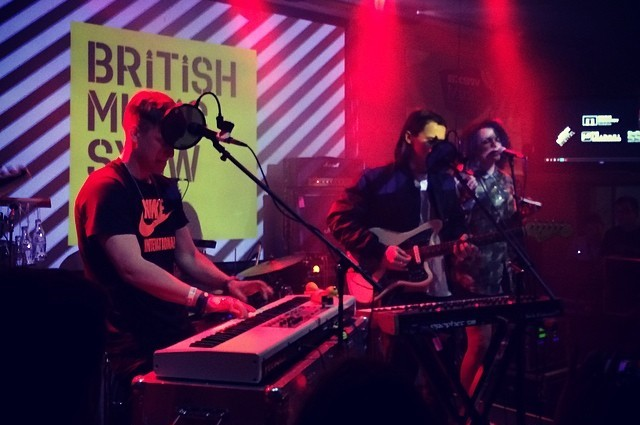
Jungle performing at SXSW in 2014

Jungle released their single "The Heat" on 21 October 2013 through Chess Club Records. In December 2013, Jungle were nominated for BBC's Sound of 2014 prize. That year, the group played at South by Southwest in Texas in March 2014. On 16 June 2014, the band played on Jimmy Kimmel Live!, and played Glastonbury Festival later that month.

Their debut album Jungle was released through XL Recordings on 14 July 2014. To celebrate the release, the band played a special launch party on a Peckham rooftop. The show was filmed using drones. During the launch week, the band played live sessions on BBC Radio 1, BBC Radio 2 and BBC Radio 6 Music.

During August 2014, the band performed at Reading and Leeds Festivals. During September 2014, Jungle made appearances on Le Grand Journal (Canal+), at London's Roundhouse for the iTunes Festival, where they played with Pharrell Williams, and on Later... with Jools Holland.

The debut album was shortlisted for the 2014 Mercury Prize in September 2014. "Busy Earnin'" was also voted in at Number 67 in the 2014 Triple J Hottest 100 Countdown in Australia.

In early 2015, it was announced that the band would perform at the Boston Calling Music Festival in May 2015. On 26 June 2015, Jungle played on the Other Stage at the 2015 Bonnaroo Music and Arts Festival. On 9 December 2017, they performed as part of the line up of Trópico, a 3-day-long music festival in Acapulco, Mexico.

=== 2018–2019: For Ever ===
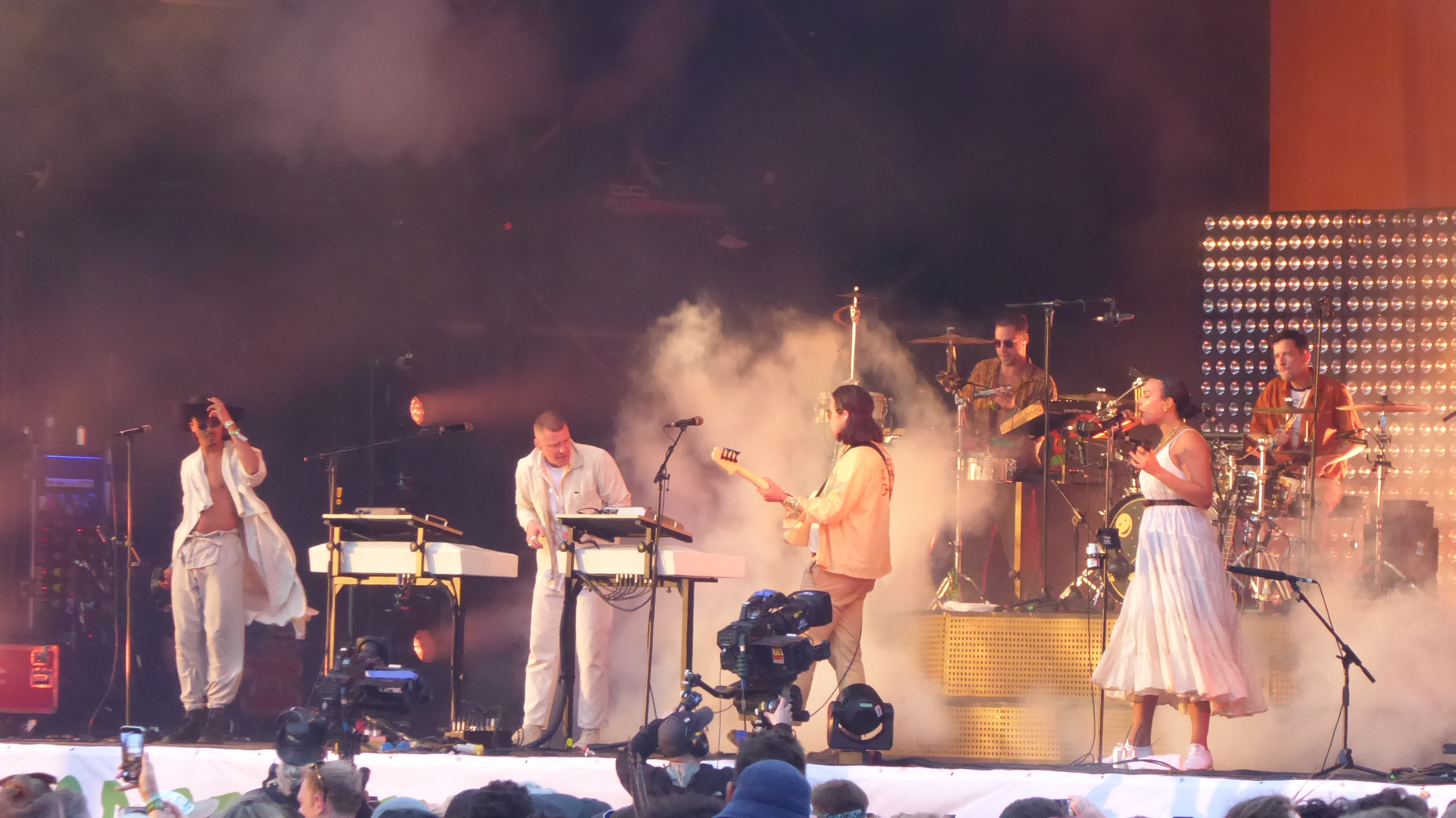
Jungle performing at the Glastonbury Festival in 2019

On 8 May 2018, Jungle released two new singles, "House in L.A." and "Happy Man," on a 7-inch record and on multiple digital music platforms.

On 22 September 2018, the band played their single "Heavy, California" on Jimmy Kimmel Live! and, on 11 December 2018, the band played their single "Smile" on The Late Show with Stephen Colbert.

=== 2021–2022: Loving in Stereo ===
On 16 March 2021, Jungle premiered a trailer for "Loving in Stereo" featuring a vignette of the dancers regularly associated with the collective from previous videos, performing in some sort of abandoned compound or prison. As of the date of the trailer's release, it was initially unclear whether the title was in reference to their next album or just a single.

It was not until 22 March 2021 that Loving in Stereo was confirmed as the title of their third studio album, by way of the announcement of the album's first single, "Keep Moving" which premiered via Annie Mac's BBC Radio 1's Hottest Record on 23 March 2021.

=== 2023–present: Volcano and Sunshine ===
Jungle performing in 2023

On 27 March 2023, the band announced their fourth studio album, Volcano, would be released on 11 August 2023 via Caiola Records, and on 11 August 2023, the band released Volcano along with an accompanying film titled Volcano, The Motion Picture. At the 2024 Glastonbury Festival, the band headlined the West Holts stage.

On 7 October 2024, the band performed a cover of Birds of a Feather by Billie Eilish on BBC Radio 1's Live Lounge.

On 6 June 2025, band members Josh Lloyd-Watson and Lydia Kitto released the album Love Made Trees, under the stage name Loaded Honey.

The band released their fifth studio album, Sunshine on 14 August 2026 via Caiola and AWAL.

== Music videos ==
Jungle are known for their one-shot dance videos co-directed by Josh Lloyd-Watson, one of the three members of the band. Lloyd-Watson frequently collaborates with the same dancers, choreographer, and cinematographer.

Music videos for all the singles from the second album – "Casio," "Heavy California," "Cherry," and "Happy Man" – were directed by Lloyd-Watson and Charlie Di Placido, with Oliver Hadlee Pearch co-directing on "Happy Man." Choreography was overseen by Nat Zangi and Kane Klendjian (KZ Creatives), who also stars in "Happy Man." Olly Wiggins was the director of photography on all four videos.

Music videos from their fourth studio album, Volcano, were compiled into the homonymous motion picture, released on YouTube. The film follows an interconnected story through the music videos: a couple who work as dancers on a television show, with Lloyd-Watson and McFarland playing the show's hosts in the production control room. The motion picture stars long-time Jungle collaborators, Will West and Mette Linturi, along with an ensemble cast of other dancers. The film was directed by Lloyd-Watson and Charlie Di Placido and choreographed by Shay Latukolan.

== Usage in media ==
Jungle's music has been featured in many television shows and other media. "Busy Earnin'" is present in the playlists of FIFA 15 and Forza Horizon 2. It has been featured in TV productions several times, for example, in the opening sequence and credits for the Tales from the Borderlands episode "Zer0 Sum," as a background music in a bar in the Brooklyn Nine-Nine episode "Jake and Sophia", as well as in a club scene in German television series Tatort (episode 916: "Der Wüstensohn"). Since the end of 2014, "Busy Earnin'" has been the title song of the German television series Mein bester Feind. It was also featured in the Superstore episode "Black Friday", as well as in the American television series House of Lies. In 2022, iTV Sport's British Touring Car Championship TV broadcasts race results and championship standing screens featured instrumental "Happy Man" and "Smile" as background audio. Their song, "Drops" was used as the end-credits track in episode 6, season 2 of the HBO series, Looking.

In November 2017, Oasis co-founder Noel Gallagher described the group as "the most current great band".

In July 2018 "Happy Man" was used during the 10th anniversary Breaking Bad panel at San Diego Comic-Con. On 13 September 2018, "Heavy, California" was used to open the Apple September event. In December 2018, the band's first single "Platoon" was used for the Peloton Digital Commercial. Their single "Beat 54" was featured in football video game by EA Sports, FIFA 19. During the summer of 2019, Jungle's song, "The Heat " was played in a Starbucks Nitro Cold Brew commercial, 'Whoa Nitro' Starbucks. Their single "Happy Man" was featured in a commercial by phone network O2 in 2019, in the first season of Spanish Netflix series Elite, and as the opening theme to the Apple TV+ show WeCrashed.

In April 2017, their track "Busy Earnin'" was used for the Toyota Yaris Hybrid TV advertisement.

Their track "GOOD TIMES" was used in the September 2024 Apple event. The song "Let's Go Back" was used in December 2024 by Maker's Mark in their Christmas campaign for bourbon. Clorox used it in their 'Clean Feels Good' commercial, advertising wipes and disinfectant. It is also being used by Booking.com, advertising travel holidays on Youtube.

== Members ==
Jungle

- Josh Lloyd-Watson – lead vocals, guitar, keyboards, bass, piano, synths, sampler (2013–present)
- Tom McFarland – lead vocals, keyboards, piano, guitar, bass, synths, samplers (2013–present)
- Lydia Kitto – lead vocals, keyboards, flute, guitar, synths, samplers (2023–present; touring/collaborator 2021–2023)

=== Touring ===
==== Current ====
- George Day – drums, samplers (2013–present), percussion (2021–2022)
- Geo Jordan – bass, guitar, keyboards, backing vocals (2021–present), percussion (2021–2022)
- Will Fry – percussion (2023–present)
- Lucy Kitto – backing vocals (2024–present), keyboards (2026–present)
- Kwayedza Kureya – backing vocals (2024–present)

==== Former ====
- Andro Cowperthwaite – backing vocals (2013–2018; 2019–2021)
- Rudi Salmon – backing vocals (2013–2021)
- Fraser MacColl – guitar, bass (2013–2021), backing vocals (2018–2021)
- Dominic Whalley – percussion (2013–2021; 2022–2023), synthesizers (2017–2021)
- Nat Zangi – backing vocals (2018–2019)
- Jordan Hadfield – bass, drums, percussion, guitar, backing vocals (2021–2022)
- Andreya Triana – backing vocals, guitar (2021–2022)

== Discography ==
=== Studio albums ===
List of studio albums, with selected details, chart positions, sales and certifications
Title	Details	Peak chart positions										Sales	Certifications
Title	Details	UK	AUS	BEL	FRA	GER	IRE	NED	NZ	SWI	US	Sales	Certifications
Jungle	Released: 14 July 2014; Label: XL; Format: CD, vinyl, digital download, streaming	7	20	21	42	43	15	42	34	22	84	UK: 100,000	BPI: Gold
For Ever	Released: 14 September 2018; Label: XL; Format: CD, vinyl, digital download, streaming	10	28	13	68	—	27	34	—	22	— (Note: For Ever did not enter the Billboard 200, but peaked at number 56 on the Top Album Sales chart.)		BPI: Silver
Loving in Stereo	Released: 13 August 2021; Label: Caiola, AWAL; Format: CD, vinyl, digital download, streaming	3	10	5	55	18	16	11	—	8	159		
Volcano	Released: 11 August 2023; Label: Caiola, AWAL; Format: CD, vinyl, digital download, streaming	3	22	25	56	19	60	35	30	8	165		BPI: Gold; RMNZ: Platinum
Sunshine	Released: 14 August 2026; Label: Caiola, AWAL; Format: CD, vinyl, digital download, streaming	4	9	4	58	16	41	5	18	13	98		
"—" denotes album that did not chart or was not released in that territory.

=== Singles ===
==== As lead artist ====
List of singles, with year released, selected chart positions, certifications, and album name shown
Title	Year	Peak chart positions										Certifications	Album
Title	Year	UK	AUS	FRA	IRE	NED	NZ	POR	SWI	US Bub.	WW	Certifications	Album
"Platoon" / "Drops"	2013	— (Note: "Platoon" did not enter the UK Singles Chart, but peaked at number 28 on the UK Physical Singles Chart.)	—	—	—	—	—	—	—	—	—		Jungle
"The Heat" / "Lucky I Got What I Want"	2013	— (Note: "The Heat" did not enter the UK Singles Chart, but peaked at number 47 on the UK Physical Singles Chart.)	—	—	—	—	—	—	—	—	—		Jungle
"Busy Earnin'"	2014	158	— (Note: "Busy Earnin'" did not enter the Australian Singles Chart, but peaked at number ten on the ARIA Hitseekers Chart.)	118	—	— (Note: "Busy Earnin'" did not enter the Dutch Singles Chart, but peaked at number two on the Dutch Singles Tip Chart.)	—	—	—	— (Note: "Busy Earnin'" did not enter the Billboard Hot 100, but peaked at number 13 on the Hot Singles Sales chart.)	—	BPI: Platinum; RMNZ: Gold	Jungle
"Time"	2014	94	—	163	—	—	—	—	—	—	—		Jungle
"Julia"	2015	—	—	—	—	—	—	—	—	—	—		Jungle
"Happy Man" / "House in LA"	2018	— (Note: "Happy Man" did not enter the UK Singles Chart, but peaked at number two on the UK Physical Singles Chart.)	—	—	—	—	—	—	—	—	—	BPI: Silver	For Ever
"Heavy, California"	2018	— (Note: "Heavy, California" did not enter the UK Singles Chart, but peaked at number three on the UK Physical Singles Chart.)	—	—	—	—	—	—	—	—	—		For Ever
"Cherry"	2018	—	—	—	—	—	—	—	—	—	—		For Ever
"Beat 54 (All Good Now)"	2018	—	—	—	—	—	—	—	—	—	—		For Ever
"Casio"	2019	—	—	—	—	—	—	—	—	—	—	BPI: Silver; RIAA: Gold; RMNZ: Gold	For Ever
"Keep Moving"	2021	—	—	—	—	—	—	—	—	—	—	BPI: Silver	Loving in Stereo
"Talk About It"	2021	—	—	—	—	—	—	—	—	—	—		Loving in Stereo
"Romeo" (featuring Bas)	2021	—	—	—	—	—	—	—	—	—	—		Loving in Stereo
"Truth"	2021	—	—	—	—	—	—	—	—	—	—		Loving in Stereo
"All of the Time"	2021	—	—	—	—	—	—	—	—	—	—		Loving in Stereo
"Good Times" / "Problemz"	2022	—	—	—	—	—	—	—	—	—	—		Non-album single
"Candle Flame" (featuring Erick the Architect)	2023	—	—	—	—	—	—	—	—	—	—	BPI: Silver; RMNZ: Gold	Volcano
"Dominoes"	2023	—	—	—	—	—	—	—	—	—	—		Volcano
"I've Been in Love" (featuring Channel Tres)	2023	—	—	—	—	—	—	—	—	—	—	BPI: Silver; RMNZ: Gold	Volcano
"Back on 74"	2023	19	49	—	31	60	31	165	70	10	127	BPI: Platinum; ARIA: Platinum; RMNZ: 2× Platinum; RIAA: Platinum; SNEP: Platinum	Volcano
"Let's Go Back"	2024	80	—	—	—	—	— (Note: "Let's Go Back" did not enter the NZ Top 40 Singles Chart, but peaked at number nine on the NZ Hot Singles Chart.)	—	—	—	—	BPI: Silver	Non-album singles
"Keep Me Satisfied"	2025	—	—	—	—	—	— (Note: "Keep Me Satisfied" did not enter the NZ Top 40 Singles Chart, but peaked at number 18 on the NZ Hot Singles Chart.)	—	—	—	—		Non-album singles
"Carry On"	2026	—	—	—	—	—	— (Note: "Carry On" did not enter the NZ Top 40 Singles Chart, but peaked at number 18 on the NZ Hot Singles Chart.)	—	—	—	—		Sunshine
"The Wave"	2026	—	—	—	—	—	— (Note: "The Wave" did not enter the NZ Top 40 Singles Chart, but peaked at number 8 on the NZ Hot Singles Chart.)	—	—	—	—		Sunshine
"Someday, Somewhere"	2026	— (Note: "Someday, Somewhere" did not enter the UK Singles Chart, but peaked at number 17 on the UK Single Sales Chart.)	—	—	—	—	— (Note: "Someday, Somewhere" did not enter the NZ Top 40 Singles Chart, but peaked at number 28 on the NZ Hot Singles Chart.)	—	—	—	—		Sunshine
"Sunshine"	2026	96	—	—	—	—	— (Note: "Sunshine" did not enter the NZ Top 40 Singles Chart, but peaked at number 9 on the NZ Hot Singles Chart.)	—	—	—	—		Sunshine
"—" denotes a recording that did not chart or was not released in that territory.

==== As featured artist ====
List of singles as featured artist
Title	Year	Peak chart positions		Album
Title	Year	NZ Hot	US Dance	Album
"Don't Be Afraid" (Diplo and Damian Lazarus featuring Jungle)	2021	38	18	Diplo

=== Other charted songs ===
Title	Year	Peak chart positions	Album
Title	Year	NZ Hot	Album
"You Ain't No Celebrity" (featuring Roots Manuva)	2023	35	Volcano
"Come Back to Me"	2026	21	Sunshine
"Where Are You Now?"	2026	28	Sunshine
"Move Like You Do"	2026	29	Sunshine

=== Remixes ===
List of remixes
Song	Year	Artist	Title
"Unstoppable"	2015	Lianne La Havas	Jungle's Edit
"Stand in Your Line"	2015	Dornik	Jungle's Edit
"History Repeats"	2021	Brittany Howard	Jungle Remix
"Golden Hour"	2022	Jvke	Jungle Remix
"Lavender Haze"	2023	Taylor Swift	Jungle Remix

=== Other produced songs ===
List of produced songs
Song	Year	Artist	Album
"Come Over"	2025	Le Sserafim	Hot

=== Music videos ===
List of music videos
Year	Title	Director
2013	"Platoon"	Josh Lloyd-Watson and Oliver Hadlee Pearch
2013	"The Heat"	Josh Lloyd-Watson and Oliver Hadlee Pearch
2014	"Busy Earnin'"	Josh Lloyd-Watson and Oliver Hadlee Pearch
2014	"Time"	Josh Lloyd-Watson and Oliver Hadlee Pearch
2015	"Julia"	Josh Lloyd-Watson and Oliver Hadlee Pearch
2018	"House in LA"	JFC Worldwide
2018	"Happy Man"	JFC Worldwide
2018	"Heavy, California"	JFC Worldwide
2018	"Cherry"	JFC Worldwide
2019	"Casio"	JFC Worldwide
2019	"Smile"	JFC Worldwide
2021	"Keep Moving"	Josh Lloyd-Watson and Charlie Di Placido
2021	"Talk About It"	Josh Lloyd-Watson and Charlie Di Placido
2021	"Romeo"	Josh Lloyd-Watson and Charlie Di Placido
2021	"Truth"	Josh Lloyd-Watson and Charlie Di Placido
2021	"All Of The Time"	Josh Lloyd-Watson and Charlie Di Placido
2021	"Lifting You // Bonnie Hill"	Josh Lloyd-Watson and Charlie Di Placido
2022	"Good Times / Problemz"	Josh Lloyd-Watson and Charlie Di Placido
2023	"Candle Flame"	Josh Lloyd-Watson and Charlie Di Placido
2023	"Dominoes"	Josh Lloyd-Watson and Charlie Di Placido
2023	"I've Been In Love"	Josh Lloyd-Watson and Charlie Di Placido
2023	"Back on 74"	Josh Lloyd-Watson and Charlie Di Placido
2024	"Let's Go Back"	Josh Lloyd-Watson and Charlie Di Placido
2025	"Keep Me Satisfied"	Josh Lloyd-Watson and Charlie Di Placido
2026	"The Wave"	Josh Lloyd-Watson and Charlie Di Placido
2026	"Someday, Somewhere"	Josh Lloyd-Watson and Charlie Di Placido

== Awards and nominations ==
Awards and nominations for Jungle
Year	Organisation	Award	Work	Result
2014	NME	Top 50 Tracks of 2014	"Busy Earnin'"	#13
2014	Mercury Prize	Album of the Year	Jungle	Nominated
2014	MTV Europe Music Awards	Best Push Act	Themselves	Nominated
2019	Hungarian Music Awards	Foreign Electronic Album	For Ever	Nominated
2024	Brit Awards	British Group	Themselves	Won
