= Volcano (Jungle album) =

Studio album by Jungle
- Released: 11 August 2023
- Studios: Studio B, Metropolis (London)
- Length: 44:34
- Labels: Caiola; AWAL
- Producer: Josh Lloyd

Jungle chronology
Loving in Stereo (2021)	Volcano (2023)	Sunshine (2026)

Singles from Volcano
- 1. "Candle Flame" Released: 28 March 2023; 2. "Dominoes" Released: 23 May 2023; 3. "I've Been in Love" Released: 20 June 2023; 4. "Back on 74" Released: 28 July 2023

Volcano is the fourth album by British electronic band Jungle, released on 11 August 2023 through Caiola Records and AWAL. It was preceded by the singles "Candle Flame", "Dominoes", "I've Been in Love" and "Back on 74". The album includes collaborations with Erick the Architect, Channel Tres, Roots Manuva, Mood Talk and Bas. The band simultaneously released a full-length film of the same name for members of their fan club. To support the album, they went on tour in Europe and North America throughout 2023 and Australia in 2024.

== Background and recording ==
The band wrote the album on the tour for their previous album, Loving in Stereo (2021), and began recording it in an Airbnb rental in Los Angeles before returning to Studio B of Metropolis Studios in London. Josh Lloyd called it "the most honest record [the band has] made", also saying: "We've always had this soul side and this love for soul music, so it's always been a little bit more song-based. The new record is just an extension of that journey". Lloyd also stated that Jungle's music is "now getting to this place where it sounds freer, and more off the cuff than it's ever done" and the "energy" on Volcano is "very quick and explosive and not so tame".

== Critical reception ==
Professional ratings
Aggregate scores
Source	Rating
Metacritic	81/100
Review scores
Source	Rating
Clash	8/10
DIY	4/5 stars
Far Out	4/5 stars
The Guardian	3/5 stars
The Line of Best Fit	8/10
The Independent	5/5 stars
The Standard	4/5 stars
NME	3/5 stars

Volcano received a score of 81 out of 100 on review aggregator Metacritic based on eight critics' reviews, indicating "universal acclaim". Robin Murray of Clash stated that "at times, Jungle's soulful appeal is worth placing alongside Sault, and that's no mean feat", calling it a "focussed, unified return" that "doffs its cap to some supreme influences, while also allowing Jungle to expand, and evolve". Ed Lawson of DIY found it to be "more breezy bops than all-out summer smashes, but nevertheless extremely rich and warm in sound". Reviewing the album for The Line of Best Fit, characterised it as "an eclectic mix of disco, soul and the ever-progressing infusions of hip-hop" that "explor[es] a whole new sphere of genres, eras and musical styles" and "place[s] Jungle at their peak of most progressive yet".

Thomas Smith of NME wrote that "genres, scenes and sounds are whizzed together and go down like a sickly-sweet cocktail at a hazy happy hour in the heights of summer" on the album, but that the duo's "hesitancy" to let their audience know more about them "does something of a disservice to the soul music they worship and lift from here". Mojo stated that the album "continues where 2021's Loving in Stereo left off", and Uncut felt that "the result sees them maintain high energy levels while showing off a richer musical palette and a keener sense of flow".

== Track listing ==
All tracks are written by Josh Lloyd, Thomas McFarland, and Lydia Kitto, except where noted.

No.	Title	Writer(s)	Length
1.	"Us Against the World"		3:27
2.	"Holding On"	Lloyd; Kitto; Declan Lennon	3:16
3.	"Candle Flame" (featuring Erick the Architect)	Lloyd; McFarland; Erick Elliott; Kitto	2:54
4.	"Dominoes"	Lloyd; McFarland; Kitto; Dave Linden; Ben Raleigh	2:57
5.	"I've Been in Love" (featuring Channel Tres)	Lloyd; Kitto; Sheldon Young	2:49
6.	"Back on 74"		3:29
7.	"You Ain't No Celebrity" (featuring Roots Manuva)	Lloyd; Kitto; Rodney Smith	2:33
8.	"Coming Back"	Lloyd; Kitto	3:21
9.	"Don't Play" (featuring Mood Talk)	Lloyd; McFarland; Larry H. Jordan; Kitto; Jamie Lloyd-Taylor	3:46
10.	"Every Night"		3:05
11.	"Problemz"		3:04
12.	"Good at Breaking Hearts" (featuring JNR Williams and 33.3)	Lloyd; Kitto; Jnr Williams	3:33
13.	"Palm Trees"		3:19
14.	"Pretty Little Thing" (featuring Bas)	Lloyd; McFarland; Abbas Hamad; Kitto	3:01
Total length:			44:34

Japanese edition bonus track
No.	Title	Writer(s)	Length
15.	"Monaco"	Josh Lloyd; Thomas McFarland; Lydia Kitto	2:38

Notes

- "Dominoes" contains a sample of "Love Is a Hurtin' Thing", written by Ben Raleigh and Dave Linden, and performed by Gloria Ann Taylor.
- "Don't Play" contains a sample of "Faith Is the Key", written by Larry H. Jordan and performed by Enlightment.

== Personnel ==
Jungle

- Josh Lloyd – production, mixing, recording (all tracks); vocals (1–8, 10, 13), bass guitar (1, 2, 5–8, 10–14), drum programming (1–4, 6–8, 10–14), synthesisers (1, 2, 4, 7–14), organ (1, 2, 10, 11, 13), guitar (5, 10); drums, keyboards, percussion (5); art direction, design
- Tom McFarland – additional production, executive producer, vocals (1, 6), synthesisers (1, 6, 10), organ (1, 10), bells (6), guitar (14)

Additional musicians

- Lydia Kitto – additional production (3), vocals (all tracks), flute (1, 8, 11, 12), bass guitar (2, 3), synthesisers (2, 11–13), organ (2, 11, 13), live drums (2), guitar (3, 6, 11–13), percussion (5, 12), keyboards (5), piano (14)
- Will Fry – congas, extra percussion (1, 10, 13)
- Declan Lennon – bass guitar, synthesisers, organ (2)
- Erick the Architect – vocals (3)
- Channel Tres – vocals (5)
- Roots Manuva – vocals (7)
- Rosie Danvers – string arrangement (11)
- Wired Strings (Note: Wired Strings consists of cellist Rosie Danvers, violist Miles Brett, and violinists Zara Benyounes, Stephanie Cavey, Hayley Pomfrett, Sarah Sexton, Elle Stanford, and Jenny Sacha.) – strings (11)
- Jnr Williams – vocals (12)
- Bas – vocals (14)

Technical

- Josh Lloyd – production, mixing, recording
- Mood Talk – production (9)
- Tom McFarland – additional production
- Lydia Kitto – additional production
- Matt Colton – mastering
- Harpaal Sanghera – engineering assistance
- Tucan – mixing (1, 11)

Visuals

- James Moruzzi – design, font, logo design

== Charts ==
=== Weekly charts ===
Weekly chart performance for Volcano
Chart (2023–2024)	Peak position
Australian Albums (ARIA)	22
Belgian Albums (Ultratop Flanders)	25
Belgian Albums (Ultratop Wallonia)	108
Dutch Albums (Album Top 100)	35
French Albums (SNEP)	56
German Albums (Offizielle Top 100)	19
Irish Albums (IRMA)	60
Lithuanian Albums (AGATA)	5
New Zealand Albums (RMNZ)	30
Portuguese Albums (AFP)	18
Scottish Albums (Official Charts)	4
Spanish Albums (Promusicae)	38
Swiss Albums (Schweizer Hitparade)	8
UK Albums (Official Charts)	3
UK Independent Albums (Official Charts)	2
US Billboard 200	165
US Independent Albums (Billboard)	26
US Top Alternative Albums (Billboard)	17
US Top Dance Albums (Billboard)	3

=== Year-end charts ===
Year-end chart performance for Volcano
Chart (2024)	Position
Belgian Albums (Ultratop Flanders)	155
Dutch Albums (Album Top 100)	88
US Top Dance/Electronic Albums (Billboard)	12

== Certifications ==
Certifications for Volcano
Region	Certification	Certified units/sales
Denmark (IFPI Danmark)	Gold	10,000^{‡}
New Zealand (RMNZ)	Platinum	15,000^{‡}
United Kingdom (BPI)	Silver	60,000^{‡}
^{‡} Sales+streaming figures based on certification alone.
