= Illit discography =

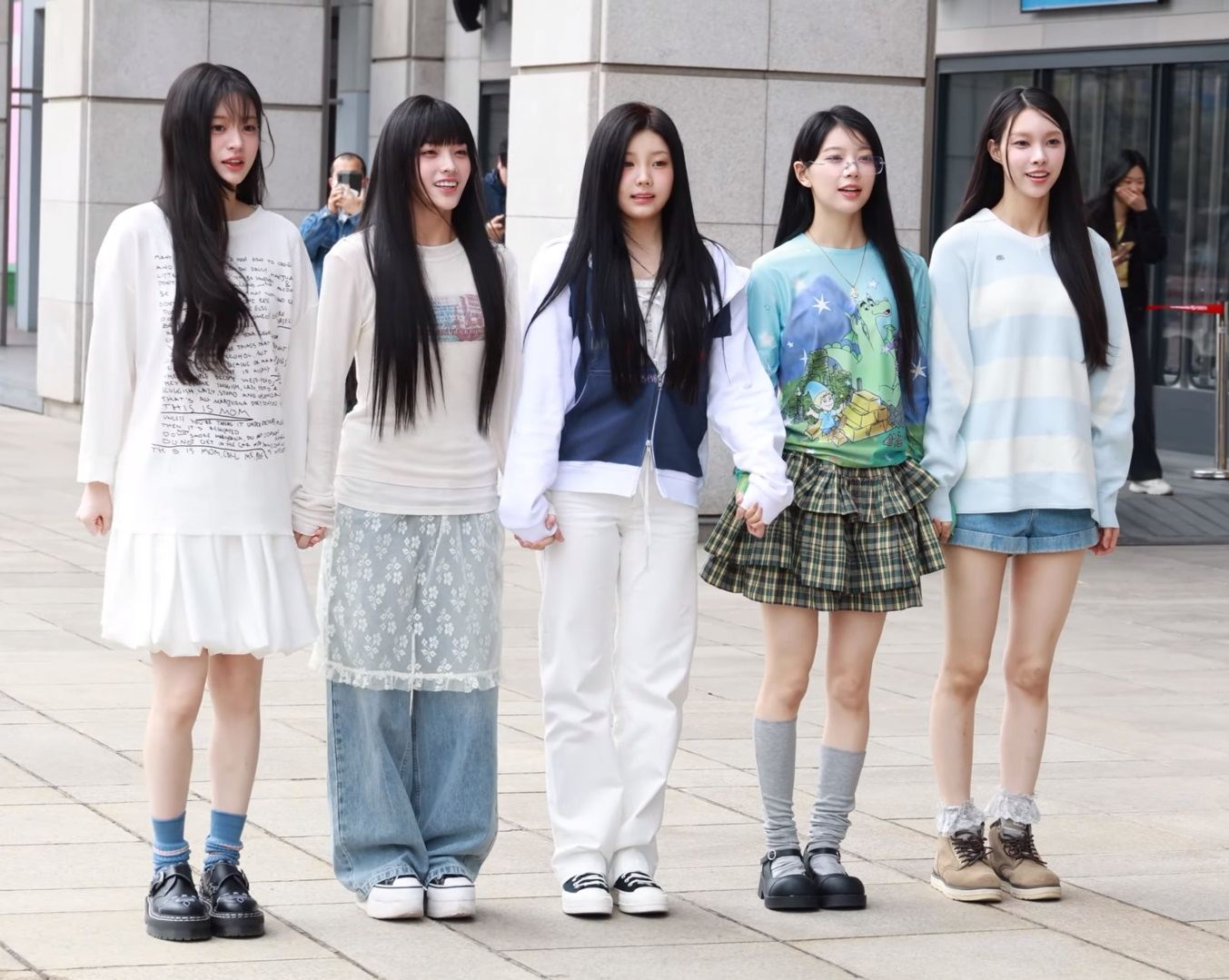
- Illit in March 2024
- EPs: 5
- Single albums: 1
- Singles: 19
- Promotional singles: 1
- Soundtrack appearances: 1

South Korean girl group Illit has released five extended plays (EPs), one single album, nineteen singles, one promotional single, and one soundtrack.

Illit debuted in March 2024 with the EP Super Real Me, which sold half a million copies and received a 2× platinum certification in South Korea. Its lead single, "Magnetic", topped the digital singles chart domestically and in Hong Kong, Malaysia, Singapore, and Taiwan. The single went on to break the record for the fastest song by a girl group to reach 100 million streams in Japan, a record previously held by NiziU's "Make You Happy" in 2020.

As of January 2026, Illit has sold approximately 2.3 million cumulative album copies.

== Extended plays ==
List of extended plays, showing selected details, selected chart positions, sales figures, and certifications
| Title | Details | Peak chart positions | | | | | | | | Sales | Certifications |
| Title | Details | KOR | CRO | GRE | JPN | JPN Hot | UK Phy. | US | US World | Sales | Certifications |
|---|---|---|---|---|---|---|---|---|---|---|---|
| Super Real Me | Released: March 25, 2024; Label: Belift Lab; Formats: CD, digital download, streaming | 3 | 5 | 43 | 3 | 3 | — | 93 | 2 | KOR: 738,790; JPN: 31,980; US: 4,000 | KMCA: 2× Platinum |
| I'll Like You | Released: October 21, 2024; Labels: Belift Lab; Format: CD, digital download, streaming | 2 | — | 36 | 2 | 2 | 98 | 94 | 2 | KOR: 571,324; JPN: 33,587 | KMCA: 2× Platinum |
| Bomb | Released: June 16, 2025; Label: Belift Lab; Formats: CD, digital download, streaming | 1 | 13 | 26 | 2 | 3 | 92 | 171 | 2 | KOR: 552,498; JPN: 41,363 | KMCA:2× Platinum |
| Mamihlapinatapai | Released: April 30, 2026; Label: Belift Lab; Formats: CD, digital download, streaming | 2 | 4 | 92 | 4 | 3 | — | 26 | 1 | KOR: 513,652; JPN: 38,733 | KMCA: 2× Platinum |
| Break Even | Released: October 26, 2026; Label: Belift Lab; Formats: CD, digital download, streaming | 2 | — | — | 4 | 4 | — | 6 | 1 | KOR: 464,237; JPN: 40,058; US: 32,500 | |
"—" denotes a recording that did not chart or was not released in that territory.

== Single albums ==
List of single albums, showing selected details, selected chart positions, sales figures, and certifications
| Title | Details | Peak chart positions | | | Sales | Certifications |
| Title | Details | KOR | GRE | JPN | Sales | Certifications |
|---|---|---|---|---|---|---|
| Not Cute Anymore | Released: November 24, 2025; Label: Belift Lab; Formats: CD, digital download, streaming | 3 | 45 | 5 | KOR: 412,382; JPN: 17,837 (phy.) | KMCA: Platinum |

== Singles ==
=== Korean singles ===
List of Korean singles, showing year released, selected chart positions, sales figures, certifications, and name of the album
| Title | Year | Peak chart positions | | | | | | | | | | Sales | Certifications | Album |
| Title | Year | KOR | CAN | HK | JPN Cmb. | JPN Hot | MLY | NZ | SGP | TWN | WW | Sales | Certifications | Album |
|---|---|---|---|---|---|---|---|---|---|---|---|---|---|---|
| "Magnetic" | 2024 | 1 | 37 | 1 | 4 | 3 | 1 | 30 | 1 | 1 | 6 | JPN: 29,994 (dig.) | KMCA: Platinum (Note: Certification for streaming); RIAJ: 3× Platinum (Note: Certification for streaming); RMNZ: Platinum | Super Real Me |
| "Cherish (My Love)" | 2024 | 22 | — | 12 | 43 | 35 | 17 | — (Note: "Cherish (My Love)" did not enter the NZ Top 40 Singles Chart, but peaked at number 28 on the NZ Hot Singles Chart.) | 22 | 10 | 110 | JPN: 1,294 (dig.) | | I'll Like You |
| "Almond Chocolate" (Korean version) | 2025 | 167 | — | — | — | — | — | — | — | — | — | | | Non-album single |
| "Do the Dance" (빌려온 고양이) (Note: The Japanese version was included in Illit's first Japanese single "Toki Yo Tomare".) | 2025 | 15 | — | — | — (Note: "Do the Dance" did not enter the Oricon Combined Singles Chart, but peaked at number 41 on the Digital Singles Chart and at number 44 on the Streaming Chart.) | 26 | — | — | — (Note: "Do the Dance" did not enter The Official Singapore Chart, but peaked at number 18 on the Regional Chart.) | 22 | 144 | JPN: 842 (dig.) | | Bomb |
| "Jellyous" (Note: A version of "Jellyous" without Sophie Powers was previously released as part of Illit's third EP Bomb.) (featuring Sophie Powers) | 2025 | — (Note: "Jellyous" (featuring Sophie Powers) did not enter the Circle Digital Chart, but peaked at number 97 on the component download chart.) | — | — | — | — | — | — | — | — | — | | | Non-album single |
| "Not Cute Anymore" | 2025 | 9 | 72 | 14 | 7 | 16 | 15 | — (Note: "Not Cute Anymore" did not enter the NZ Top 40 Singles Chart, but peaked at number 13 on the NZ Hot Singles Chart.) | 6 | 16 | 60 | | | Not Cute Anymore |
| "Bubee" (Korean version) | 2026 | — (Note: "Bubee (Korean version)" did not enter the Circle Digital Chart, but it peaked at number 59 on the component download chart.) | — | — | — | — | — | — | — | — | — | | | Non-album single |
| "It's Me" | 2026 | 2 | — | 19 | 9 | 7 | — | — (Note: "It's Me" did not enter the NZ Top 40 Singles Chart, but peaked at number 10 on the NZ Hot Singles Chart.) | 24 | 7 | 67 | JPN: 9,652 (dig.) | | Mamihlapinatapai |
| "I Got Your Back" (featuring Jisoo and Momoka of Hana; Korean version) | 2026 | — (Note: "I Got Your Back (Korean version)" did not enter the Circle Digital Chart, but it peaked at number 15 on the component download chart.) | — | — | — | — | — | — | — | — | — | | | Non-album single |
| "You're Under Arrest" (체포하겠어) | 2026 | 4 | — | 18 | 11 | 8 | — | — (Note: "You're Under Arrest" did not enter the NZ Top 40 Singles Chart, but peaked at number 5 on the NZ Hot Singles Chart.) | 8 | 4 | 22 | | | Break Even |
"—" denotes a recording that did not chart or was not released in that territory.

=== Japanese singles ===
List of Japanese singles, showing year released, selected chart positions, sales figures, certifications, and name of the album
| Title | Year | Peak chart positions | | | | Sales | Certifications | Album |
| Title | Year | KOR DL | JPN | JPN Cmb. | JPN Hot | Sales | Certifications | Album |
|---|---|---|---|---|---|---|---|---|
| "Almond Chocolate" (Note: Included on Illit's first Japanese single "Toki Yo Tomare".) | 2025 | 87 | — | 16 | 13 | JPN: 2,429 (dig.) | RIAJ: Platinum (st.) | Non-album singles |
| "Topping" | 2025 | — | — | — | — | | | Non-album singles |
| "Toki Yo Tomare" (時よ止まれ) | 2025 | — | 2 | 2 | 4 | JPN: 69,459 (phy.) | RIAJ: Gold (phy.) | Non-album singles |
| "Sunday Morning" (Note: Included in Illit's second Japanese single "I Got Your Back".) | 2026 | 118 | — | — (Note: "Sunday Morning" did not enter the Oricon Combined Singles Chart, but peaked at number 35 on the Digital Singles Chart.) | — (Note: "Sunday Morning" did not enter the Billboard Japan Hot 100, but peaked at number 35 on the Download Songs.) | JPN: 1,372 (dig.) | | Non-album singles |
| "Bubee" | 2026 | — | — | — (Note: "Bubee" did not enter the Oricon Combined Singles Chart, but peaked at number 46 on the Digital Singles Chart.) | — (Note: "Bubee" did not enter the Billboard Japan Hot 100, but peaked at number 51 on the Download Songs.) | | | Non-album singles |
| "I Got Your Back" (featuring Jisoo and Momoka of Hana) | 2026 | 101 | 4 | 3 | 2 | JPN: 71,009 (phy.) | RIAJ: Gold (phy.) | Non-album singles |
| "Swingin' Magic" | 2026 | — | — | — | — | | | Non-album singles |
"—" denotes a recording that did not chart or was not released in that territory.

=== English singles ===
List of English singles, showing year released, selected chart positions, and name of the album
| Title | Year | Peak chart positions | | | | | | | | | | Album |
| Title | Year | KOR | CAN | HK | MLY | NZ | SGP | TWN | UK | US | WW | Album |
|---|---|---|---|---|---|---|---|---|---|---|---|---|
| "Baby It's Both" (Note: "Baby It's Both" serves as the English version of "Tick-Tack" from Illit's second EP I'll Like You.) (featuring Ava Max) | 2024 | — | — | — | — | — | — | — | — | — | — | Non-album singles |
| "Iconic by Mistake" (with Le Sserafim and Katseye) | 2026 | 123 | 46 | 9 | 4 | 29 | 3 | 6 | 22 | 38 | 23 | Non-album singles |
"—" denotes a recording that did not chart or was not released in that territory.

== Promotional singles ==
List of promotional singles, showing year released, and name of the album
| Title | Year | Album |
|---|---|---|
| "All for You" (가장 빛날 너에게) | 2025 | Non-album single |

== Soundtrack appearances ==
List of soundtrack appearances, showing year released, and name of the album
| Title | Year | Album |
|---|---|---|
| "Secret Quest" (비밀찾기) | 2025 | Pokémon Horizons – Rising Hope OST |

== Other charted songs ==
List of other charted songs, showing year released, selected chart positions, certifications, and name of the album
| Title | Year | Peak chart positions | | | | Certifications | Album |
| Title | Year | KOR | JPN Hot | NZ Hot | SGP Reg. | Certifications | Album |
|---|---|---|---|---|---|---|---|
| "My World" | 2024 | 153 | — | — | — | | Super Real Me |
| "Lucky Girl Syndrome" | 2024 | 28 | 95 | — | — | RIAJ: Gold (st.) | Super Real Me |
| "Midnight Fiction" | 2024 | 173 | — | — | — | | Super Real Me |
| "I'll Like You" | 2024 | — (Note: "I'll Like You" did not enter the Circle Digital Chart, but it peaked at number 43 on the component download chart.) | — | — | — | | I'll Like You |
| "IYKYK (If You Know You Know)" | 2024 | — (Note: "IYKYK (If You Know You Know)" did not enter the Circle Digital Chart, but it peaked at number 49 on the component download chart.) | — | — | — | | I'll Like You |
| "Tick-Tack" | 2024 | 140 | — (Note: "Tick-Tack" did not enter the Billboard Japan Hot 100, but it peaked at number 99 on the Download Songs.) | — | 22 | | I'll Like You |
| "Pimple" | 2024 | — (Note: "Pimple" did not enter the Circle Digital Chart, but it peaked at number 61 on the component download chart.) | — | — | — | | I'll Like You |
| "Little Monster" | 2025 | — (Note: "Little Monster" did not enter the Circle Digital Chart, but it peaked at number 18 on the component download chart.) | — | — | — | | Bomb |
| "Bamsopoong" (밤소풍) | 2025 | — (Note: "Bamsopoong" did not enter the Circle Digital Chart, but it peaked at number 22 on the component download chart.) | — | — | — | | Bomb |
| "Jellyous" | 2025 | — (Note: "Jellyous" did not enter the Circle Digital Chart, but it peaked at number 25 on the component download chart.) | — | — | — | | Bomb |
| "Oops!" | 2025 | — (Note: "Oops!" did not enter the Circle Digital Chart, but it peaked at number 30 on the component download chart.) | — | — | — | | Bomb |
| "Not Me" | 2025 | — (Note: "Not Me" did not enter the Circle Digital Chart, but it peaked at number 27 on the component download chart.) | — | — | — | | Not Cute Anymore |
| "Paw, Paw!" | 2026 | — (Note: "Paw, paw!" did not enter the Circle Digital Chart, but it peaked at number 37 on the component download chart.) | — | — | — | | Mamihlapinatapai |
| "GRWM (Get Ready with Me)" | 2026 | — (Note: "GRWM (Get Ready with Me)" did not enter the Circle Digital Chart, but it peaked at number 38 on the component download chart.) | — | — | — | | Mamihlapinatapai |
| "Mamihlapinatapai" | 2026 | — (Note: "Mamihlapinatapai" did not enter the Circle Digital Chart, but it peaked at number 39 on the component download chart.) | — | — | — | | Mamihlapinatapai |
| "Love, Older You" | 2026 | — (Note: "Love, Older You" did not enter the Circle Digital Chart, but it peaked at number 40 on the component download chart.) | — | — | — | | Mamihlapinatapai |
| "Pop" | 2026 | — | — | 12 | — | | Break Even |
"—" denotes releases that did not chart or were not released in that region.
