= List of awards and nominations received by Illit =

Illit awards and nominations
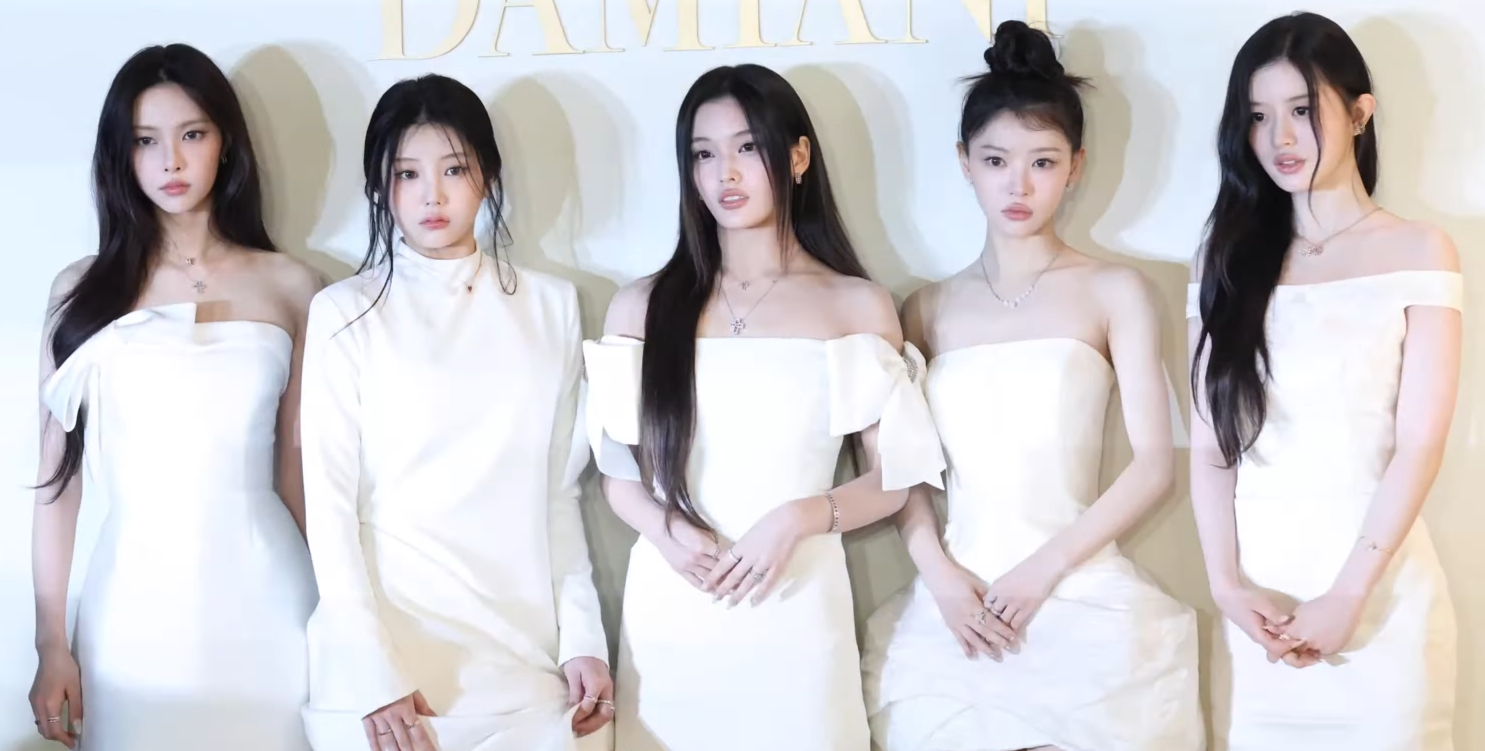
- Illit in 2026
Awards and nominations
Award	Wins	Nominations
American Music Awards	0	1
Asia Artist Awards	0	1
Asian Pop Music Awards	1	3
Billboard Music Awards	0	1
D Awards	3	4
Golden Disc Awards	2	4
Hanteo Music Awards	1	9
iHeartRadio Music Awards	1	3
Japan Gold Disc Award	3	3
Japan Record Awards	2	2
K-World Dream Awards	2	2
Korea Grand Music Awards	0	5
Korean Music Awards	0	2
MAMA Awards	5	17
Melon Music Awards	6	15
MTV Europe Music Awards	0	1
Music Awards Japan	0	4
Seoul Music Awards	2	5
TikTok Awards Korea	1	1
TMElive International Music Awards	1	1

Totals (Note: Certain award groups do not simply award one winner. They acknowledge several different recipients, have runners-up, and have third place. Since this is a specific recognition and is different from losing an award, runner-up mentions are considered wins in this award tally. For simplification and to avoid errors, each award in this list has been presumed to have had a prior nomination.)
- Wins: 30
- Nominations: 84

Illit is a South Korean girl group formed by Belift Lab, comprising Yunah, Minju, Moka, Wonhee, and Iroha. The group debuted in March 2024 with the extended play Super Real Me, which included the lead single "Magnetic". The song received several accolades, winning Best Digital Song at the 39th Golden Disc Awards and earning a nomination for Top Global K-Pop Song at the 2024 Billboard Music Awards. The group received multiple rookie awards following their debut, including Best New Artist – Female at the 2024 MAMA Awards, New Artist of the Year at the 2024 Melon Music Awards, and Rookie Artist of the Year at the 39th Golden Disc Awards. They also received nominations for Rookie of the Year and Best K-pop Song at the 2025 Korean Music Awards.

Internationally, Illit received the New Artist Award at the 2024 Japan Record Awards and Best New Artist (K-pop) at the 2025 iHeartRadio Music Awards. "Magnetic" won Song of the Year by Download (Asia), Song of the Year by Streaming (Asia), and Best 5 Songs by Streaming at the 2025 Japan Gold Disc Awards. The group subsequently received the Main Prize and Best Group Award at the 2025 Seoul Music Awards, alongside Best Performance - Female at the 2025 Melon Music Awards.

== Awards and nominations ==
Name of the award ceremony, year presented, category, nominee of the award, and the result of the nomination
Award ceremony	Year	Category	Nominee / work	Result	Ref.
American Music Awards	2026	Best Female K-Pop Artist	Illit	Nominated	
Asia Artist Awards	2026	Popularity Award – Group (Female)	Illit	Pending	
Asian Pop Music Awards	2024	Top 20 Songs of the Year (Overseas)	"Magnetic"	Won	
Asian Pop Music Awards	2024	Best Dance Performance (Overseas)	"Magnetic"	Nominated	
Asian Pop Music Awards	2024	Best New Artist (Overseas)	Super Real Me	Nominated	
Billboard Music Awards	2024	Top Global K-Pop Song	"Magnetic"	Nominated	
D Awards	2025	Best Choreography	Illit	Won	
D Awards	2025	Delights Blue Label	Illit	Won	
D Awards	2025	Dreams Silver Label	Illit	Won	
D Awards	2025	Best Girl Group Popularity Award	Illit	Nominated	
Golden Disc Awards	2024	Best Digital Song (Bonsang)	"Magnetic"	Won	
Golden Disc Awards	2024	Rookie Artist of the Year	Illit	Won	
Golden Disc Awards	2024	Most Popular Artist – Female	Illit	Nominated	
Golden Disc Awards	2024	Song of the Year (Daesang)	"Magnetic"	Nominated	
Hanteo Music Awards	2025	Rookie of the Year – Female	Illit	Won	
Hanteo Music Awards	2025	Artist of the Year (Bonsang)	Illit	Nominated	
Hanteo Music Awards	2025	Global Artist – Africa	Illit	Nominated	
Hanteo Music Awards	2025	Global Artist – Asia	Illit	Nominated	
Hanteo Music Awards	2025	Global Artist – Europe	Illit	Nominated	
Hanteo Music Awards	2025	Global Artist – North America	Illit	Nominated	
Hanteo Music Awards	2025	Global Artist – Oceania	Illit	Nominated	
Hanteo Music Awards	2025	Global Artist – South America	Illit	Nominated	
Hanteo Music Awards	2025	WhosFandom Award – Female	Illit	Nominated	
iHeartRadio Music Awards	2025	Best New Artist (K-pop)	Illit	Won	
iHeartRadio Music Awards	2025	Favorite K-pop Dance Challenge	"Magnetic"	Nominated	
iHeartRadio Music Awards	2025	K-pop Song of the Year	"Magnetic"	Nominated	
Japan Gold Disc Award	2025	Best 5 Songs by Streaming	"Magnetic"	Won	
Japan Gold Disc Award	2025	Song of the Year by Download (Asia)	"Magnetic"	Won	
Japan Gold Disc Award	2025	Song of the Year by Streaming (Asia)	"Magnetic"	Won	
Japan Record Awards	2024	New Artist Award	Illit	Won	
Japan Record Awards	2026	Excellent Work Awards	It's Me	Won	
K-World Dream Awards	2025	Best Music Video Award	Illit	Won	
K-World Dream Awards	2025	Bonsang	Illit	Won	
Korea Grand Music Awards	2024	Best 10 Artists	Illit	Nominated	
Korea Grand Music Awards	2024	Best 10 Songs	"Magnetic"	Nominated	
Korea Grand Music Awards	2024	Best Rookie – Artist	Illit	Nominated	
Korea Grand Music Awards	2024	Best Rookie – Song	"Magnetic"	Nominated	
Korea Grand Music Awards	2024	Trend of the Year	Illit	Nominated	
Korean Music Awards	2025	Rookie of the Year	Illit	Nominated	
Korean Music Awards	2025	Best K-pop Song	"Magnetic"	Nominated	
MAMA Awards	2024	Best New Artist – Female	Illit	Won	
MAMA Awards	2024	Artist of the Year	Illit	Nominated	
MAMA Awards	2024	Best Choreography	"Magnetic"	Nominated	
MAMA Awards	2024	Best Dance Performance – Female	"Magnetic"	Nominated	
MAMA Awards	2024	Fans' Choice Top 10 – Female	Illit	Nominated	
MAMA Awards	2024	Song of the Year	"Magnetic"	Nominated	
MAMA Awards	2025	Fans' Choice Top 10 – Female	Illit	Won	
MAMA Awards	2025	Best Dance Performance Female Group	"Cherish (My Love)"	Nominated	
MAMA Awards	2025	Fans' Choice of the Year	Illit	Nominated	
MAMA Awards	2025	Song of the Year	"Cherish (My Love)"	Nominated	
MAMA Awards	2026	Artist of The Year	Illit	Nominated	
MAMA Awards	2026	Best Choreography	It's Me	Nominated	
MAMA Awards	2026	Best Female Group	Illit	Nominated	
MAMA Awards	2026	Best Dance Performance – Female Group	It's Me	Won	
MAMA Awards	2026	Best Collaboration	Iconic by Mistake (with Le Sserafim and Katseye)	Nominated	
MAMA Awards	2026	Best Song Top 10	It's Me	Won	
MAMA Awards	2026	Fans' Choice Top 10 – Female	Illit	Won	
Melon Music Awards	2024	New Artist of the Year	Illit	Won	
Melon Music Awards	2024	Album of the Year	Super Real Me	Nominated	
Melon Music Awards	2024	Best Group – Female	Illit	Nominated	
Melon Music Awards	2024	Song of the Year	"Magnetic"	Nominated	
Melon Music Awards	2025	Best Performance – Female	Illit	Won	
Melon Music Awards	2025	Berriz Global Fans' Choice	Illit	Nominated	
Melon Music Awards	2025	Top 10 Artist	Illit	Nominated	
Melon Music Awards	2026	Best Group – Female	Illit	Nominated	
Melon Music Awards	2026	Best Performance – Female	Illit	Won	
Melon Music Awards	2026	Global Impact Artist	Illit	Won	
Melon Music Awards	2026	Global Top 10 Artist	Illit	Won	
Melon Music Awards	2026	Top 10 Artist	Illit	Won	
Melon Music Awards	2026	Album of The Year	Mamihlapinatapai	Nominated	
Melon Music Awards	2026	Artist of The Year	Illit	Nominated	
Melon Music Awards	2026	Song of The Year	It's Me	Nominated	
MTV Europe Music Awards	2024	Best Asia Act	Illit	Nominated	
Music Awards Japan	2025	Best K-pop Song in Japan	"Magnetic"	Nominated	
Music Awards Japan	2025	Best of Listeners' Choice: International Song	"Magnetic"	Nominated	
Music Awards Japan	2026	Best K-Pop Song in Japan	"Almond Chocolate"	Nominated	
Music Awards Japan	2026	International Song powered by Spotify	"Almond Chocolate"	Nominated	
Seoul Music Awards	2025	Best Group Award	Illit	Won	
Seoul Music Awards	2025	Main Prize (Bonsang)	Illit	Won	
Seoul Music Awards	2025	K-pop World Choice – Group	Illit	Nominated	
Seoul Music Awards	2025	K-Wave Special Award	Illit	Nominated	
Seoul Music Awards	2025	Popularity Award	Illit	Nominated	
TikTok Awards Korea	2024	Best Viral Song	"Magnetic"	Won	
TMElive International Music Awards	2025	Annual Overseas Popular Song	"Magnetic"	Won	

== Listicles ==
Name of publisher, year listed, name of listicle, and placement
Publisher	Year	Listicle	Placement	Ref.
Forbes Korea	2025	K-Idol of the Year 30	18th	
Teen Vogue	2024	12 Girl Groups to Watch in 2024	Placed	
