= Toki Yo Tomare =

- Digital cover

Single by Illit
- Language: Japanese
- Released: September 1, 2025
- Genre: Disco-pop
- Length: 3:08
- Label: Belift Lab
- Songwriters: Mulasaki Ima; Scott Russell Stoddart; Andy Love; Jjean
- Producer: Stoddart

Illit singles chronology
"Topping" (2025)	"Toki Yo Tomare" (2025)	"Not Cute Anymore" (2025)

Music video
- "Toki Yo Tomare" on YouTube

"Toki Yo Tomare" (時よ止まれ, Toki yo tomare; lit. 'Stop time') is a song recorded by South Korean girl group Illit for their first Japanese maxi single of the same name. It was released by Belift Lab as the single's lead track on September 1, 2025.

== Background and release ==
On January 31, 2025, Belift Lab announced Illit's first original Japanese song, "Almond Chocolate", which served as the theme song of the Japanese live-action film adaptation of the manga It Takes More Than a Pretty Face to Fall in Love. The song was released on February 14.

On July 14, Illit's first Japanese single, "Toki Yo Tomare", was announced. The single will consist of two new songs: its title track and "Topping", along with the Japanese version of "Do the Dance" from their third extended play Bomb, and "Almond Chocolate". In August, a snippet of the track "Topping" was featured in a Japanese commercial for the designer sports fashion brand Lacoste. The song was then released digitally later that same month. "Toki Yo Tomare" was released digitally on September 1, which was followed by its physical release two days later.

== Track listing ==
Track listing for "Toki Yo Tomare"
No.	Title	Writer(s)	Producer(s)	Length
1.	"Toki Yo Tomare" (時よ止まれ)	Mulasaki Ima; Scott Russell Stoddart; Andy Love; Jjean	Stoddart	3:08
2.	"Topping"	Noa; Dyvahh; Soma Genda	Dyvahh; Genda	2:46
3.	"Do the Dance" (Japanese version)	"Hitman" Bang; Moa "Cazzi Opeia" Carlebecker (Sunshine); Ellen Berg (Sunshine); Fig Tape; Dyvahh; Frants; Shinkung; Tomoyuki Asakawa; Jang Jung-won (Jamfactory); Mia (153/Joombas); Bay (153/Joombas); Kim Kiwi; Yunah; Maryjane (Lalala Studio); 4 Seasons (Lee Aeng-du, Kim Chae-ah, and Lee Eun-hwa) (153/Joombas); Huh Yunjin	"Hitman" Bang; Frants; Fig Tape; Shinkung; Dyvahh	3:08
4.	"Almond Chocolate"	Pdogg; Nakajin; Takahashi Shiho; Ghstloop	Pdogg; Ghstloop	3:21
Total length:				12:25

== Charts ==
=== Weekly charts ===
Weekly chart performance
Chart (2025)	Peak position
Japan (Japan Hot 100)	4
Japan (Oricon)	2
Japan Combined Singles (Oricon)	2

=== Monthly charts ===
Monthly chart performance
Chart (2025)	Position
Japan (Oricon)	9

=== Year-end charts ===
Year-end chart performance
Chart (2025)	Position
Japan Top Singles Sales (Billboard Japan)	92
Japan (Oricon)	80

== Certification ==
Region	Certification	Certified units/sales
Japan (RIAJ)	Gold	100,000^{^}
^{^} Shipments figures based on certification alone.

== Release history ==
Release history
Region	Date	Format	Label
Various	September 1, 2025	Digital download; streaming	Belift Lab
Japan	September 3, 2025	CD	Belift Lab
South Korea	September 3, 2025	CD	Belift Lab
