= You're Under Arrest (song) =

- Remixes cover

Single by Illit

from the EP Break Even
- Language: Korean
- Released: October 26, 2026
- Genre: Electro-pop
- Length: 3:01
- Label: Belift Lab
- Songwriters: "Hitman" Bang; Slow Rabbit; Estratosfera; Qiri; Sorana; Rollo; Iselin Solheim; Mathilde Nyegaard; Fig Tape; Blush Davis; Nathan Fertig; Aaron Theodore Berton; Matthew Crawford; Melanie Fontana; GG Ramirez; Lindgren; Ned Houston; Tim Tan; Tomatomat; Emma Rosen; Yunah
- Producers: "Hitman" Bang; Slow Rabbit; EQ

Illit singles chronology
"Swingin' Magic" (2026)	"You're Under Arrest" (2026)

Music video
- "You're Under Arrest" on YouTube

Professional ratings
Review scores
Source	Rating
IZM	2/5 stars

"You're Under Arrest" (Korean: 체포하겠어; RR: Chepohagesseo) is a song recorded by South Korean girl group Illit for their fifth extended play Break Even. It was released as the EP's lead single by Belift Lab on October 26, 2026. An electro-pop song, it depicts the emotional severing of a relationship.

== Background and release ==
On September 28, 2026, Belift Lab announced that the song titled "You're Under Arrest" would serve as the lead single for Illit's fifth extended play Break Even, set for release on October 26. Upon the release of a teasing video for the EP on October 5, a preview of the song was revealed. The group performed the song ahead of its release during the encore concert for their Press Start tour on October 17 and 18. On October 23, a teaser for the song's music video was released. The song was released alongside its music video on October 26, upon the release of the extended play. The music video features a cameo of actor Song Kang. The remixes version was released on November 6.

== Composition ==
"You're Under Arrest" was written by "Hitman" Bang, Slow Rabbit, Estratosfera, Qiri, Sorana, Rollo, Iselin Solheim, Mathilde Nyegaard, Fig Tape, Blush Davis, Nathan Fertig, Aaron Theodore Berton, Matthew Crawford, Melanie Fontana, GG Ramirez, Lindgren, Ned Houston, Tim Tan, Tomatomat, Emma Rosen and Yunah, and produced by "Hitman" Bang, Slow Rabbit and EQ. It is an electro-pop song featuring a "cheerful whistle sound". Lyrically, the song depicts the severing of a relationship when one is at their limits emotionally.

== Accolades ==
Music program awards for "You're Under Arrest"
Program	Date	Ref.
Music Bank	November 6, 2026	
Show K-Pop	November 9, 2026	
Show K-Pop	November 16, 2026	

== Track listing ==
- Digital download and streaming – Remixes
1. "You're Under Arrest" – 3:01
2. "You're Under Arrest" (Kids remix) – 2:20
3. "You're Under Arrest" (Whistle remix) – 2:31
4. "You're Under Arrest" (Club remix) – 3:50
5. "You're Under Arrest" (Hyper remix) – 3:09
6. "You're Under Arrest" (sped up) – 2:19
7. "You're Under Arrest" (slowed + reverb) – 3:57

== Charts ==
=== Weekly charts ===
Weekly chart performance for "You're Under Arrest"
Chart (2026)	Peak position
Global 200 (Billboard)	22
Hong Kong (Billboard)	18
Japan Combined Singles (Oricon)	11
Japan Hot 100 (Billboard)	8
New Zealand Hot Singles (RMNZ)	5
Singapore (RIAS)	8
South Korea (Circle)	4
Taiwan (Billboard)	4
UK Video Streaming (Official Charts)	92
US Bubbling Under Hot 100 (Billboard)	22
US Hot Dance/Pop Songs (Billboard)	6

=== Monthly charts ===
Monthly chart performance for "You're Under Arrest"
Chart (2026)	Peak position
South Korea (Circle)	111

== Release history ==
Release history for "You're Under Arrest"
Region	Date	Format	Version	Label
Various	October 26, 2026	Digital download; streaming	Original	Belift Lab
Various	November 6, 2026	Digital download; streaming	Remixes	Belift Lab
