= GRWM =

GRWM may refer to:

- Get Ready With Me, a genre of online social media videos
- "GRWM", a song by GFriend from Walpurgis Night, 2020
- "GRWM", a song by Lorde from Virgin, 2025
- "GRWM (Get Ready With Me)", a song by Illit from Mamihlapinatapai, 2026
