= Break-even (disambiguation) =

Break-even is a point where any difference between plus or minus or equivalent changes.

Break-even (or break even) may also refer to:

- Break-even point, the term in economics
- Breakeven, the point in the fusion energy gain factor where input and output energy is equal
- "Breakeven" (song), a 2008 song by the Script
- Break Even (band), an Australian hardcore punk band
- Break Even (EP), a 2026 EP by Illit
