= Not Cute Anymore =

- Digital cover

Single by Illit

from the album Not Cute Anymore
- Language: Korean; English
- B-side: "Not Me"
- Released: November 24, 2025
- Genre: Pop
- Length: 2:11
- Label: Belift Lab
- Songwriters: Jasper Harris; Sasha Alex Sloan; Youra
- Producer: Jasper Harris

Illit singles chronology
"Toki Yo Tomare" (2025)	"Not Cute Anymore" (2025)	"Sunday Morning" (2026)

Illit chronology
Bomb (2025)	Not Cute Anymore (2025)	Mamihlapinatapai (2026)

Music video
- "Not Cute Anymore" on YouTube

Professional ratings
Review scores
Source	Rating
IZM	3/5 stars

"Not Cute Anymore" (stylized in all caps) is a song recorded by South Korean girl group Illit for their first single album of the same name. It was released by Belift Lab on November 24, 2025, along with its B-side track "Not Me".

== Background and release ==
On October 27, 2025, Belift Lab announced through the release of a promotional calendar that Illit would be releasing their first single album Not Cute Anymore on November 24. "Not Cute Anymore" was confirmed to be the lead song, with the B-side track titled "Not Me", upon the reveal of the tracklist on November 3. On November 17, moving posters for the song's music video were released. Two music video teasers for the song were released on November 21 and 23 respectively. The song was released alongside its music video upon the release of the single album on November 24.

== Composition ==
"Not Cute Anymore" was written and produced by Jasper Harris, with Sasha Alex Sloan and Youra participating in the writing. The song is described as a pop song based on reggae rhythms. The B-side "Not Me", co-written by Illit members Yunah, Minju and Moka, is built on an interpolation of the Ting Tings' "That's Not My Name", describing how people may see you in a certain way, but that you cannot be described by a single word, and it incorporates different nicknames the members call each other.

== Promotion ==
Illit performed "Not Cute Anymore" on three music programs in the first week of promotion: KBS's Music Bank on November 28, MBC's Show! Music Core on November 29, and SBS's Inkigayo on November 30.

== Accolades ==
Music program awards
Program	Date	Ref.
Music Bank	December 5, 2025	
Show Champion	December 17, 2025	
Show! Music Core	January 17, 2026	

== Track listing ==
Not Cute Anymore track listing
No.	Title	Writer(s)	Producer(s)	Length
1.	"Not Cute Anymore"	Jasper Harris; Sasha Alex Sloan; Youra	Jasper Harris	2:11
2.	"Not Me"	Emilia Hilgers; Tamia Harrell; Josh Allen; Patrick McManus; Michael McCall; Julian De Martino; Katie White; Dyvahh; Belift Lab Inc.; Moon Yeo-reum (Jamfactory); SSAC (MUMW); Vincenzo; Tatte; Lee Hye-yoom (Jamfactory); Shinkung; Forever Noh; Exy; Sohlhee; Jo Yoon-kyung; Ellie Suh (153/Joombas); Kim Bo-eun (Jamfactory); Lee Geu-rin (Lalala Studio); 4 Seasons (Lee Eun-hwa, Lee Aeng-du, and Kim Chae-ah) (153/Joombas); Danke; Yunah; Minju; Moka	Pebbles & TamTam; Vitals; Boston & Pat	2:34
Total length:				4:45

- Digital download and streaming – Holiday Remixes
1. "Not Cute Anymore" – 2:11
2. "Not Cute Anymore" (Holiday Party version) – 2:26
3. "Not Cute Anymore" (Holiday Night version) – 2:16
4. "Not Cute Anymore" (sped up version) – 1:42
5. "Not Cute Anymore" (Holiday Party sped up version) – 1:52
6. "Not Cute Anymore" (Holiday Night sped up version) – 1:30
7. "Not Cute Anymore" (instrumental) – 2:11

=== Notes ===
- "Not Me" contains an interpolation of "That's Not My Name", written by Julian De Martino and Katie White, and performed by the Ting Tings.

== Charts ==
=== Weekly charts ===
Weekly chart performance
Chart (2025–2026)	Peak position
Canada (Canadian Hot 100)	72
Global 200 (Billboard)	60
Hong Kong (Billboard)	14
Japan (Japan Hot 100)	16
Japan (Oricon)	5
Japan Combined Singles (Oricon)	7
Malaysia (IFPI)	15
Malaysia International (RIM)	7
New Zealand Hot Singles (RMNZ)	13
Philippines (Philippines Hot 100)	75
Singapore (RIAS)	6
South Korea (Circle)	9
South Korean Albums (Circle)	3
South Korea Hot 100 (Billboard)	21
Taiwan (Billboard)	17
UK Indie Breakers (OCC)	6
US Bubbling Under Hot 100 (Billboard)	7
US World Digital Song Sales (Billboard)	4
Vietnam Hot 100 (Billboard)	61

=== Monthly charts ===
Monthly chart performance
Chart (2025–2026)	Position
Japan (Oricon)	13
South Korea (Circle)	11
South Korean Albums (Circle)	10

=== Year-end charts ===
Year-end chart performance
Chart (2025)	Position
South Korean Albums (Circle)	82

== Certifications ==
Certifications for "Not Cute Anymore"
Region	Certification	Certified units/sales
South Korea (KMCA) Physical	Platinum	250,000^{^}
^{^} Shipments figures based on certification alone.

== Release history ==
Release history
Region	Date	Format	Version	Label
Various	November 24, 2025	Digital download; streaming	Original	Belift Lab
South Korea	November 24, 2025	CD	Original	Belift Lab
Various	December 19, 2025	Digital download; streaming	Holiday Remixes	Belift Lab
