= Sorana (singer) =

Romanian singer and songwriter

- Born: Sorana Paula Păcurar; Romania
- Occupations: Singer; songwriter; make-up artist; fashion stylist
- Years active: 2015–present
- Musical career
- Genre: Dance-pop
- Instrument: Vocals
- Label: Atlantic Records

Sorana Paula Păcurar better known as Sorana Păcurar or simply as Sorana, is a Romanian singer and songwriter. Originally from Cluj-Napoca, she was a finalist for the 2010 Miss Romania title. Upon taking part in X Factor Romania, acting in the Romanian soap opera O nouă viață (A New Life) and being part of the Romanian group Lala Band, Sorana released her first single "Povești" ("Stories") in 2015 under Marius Moga's label DeMoga Music. She then left her native country to further pursue a musical career and relocated to London and then Los Angeles. Her portfolio as a songwriter includes the commercially successful songs "Takeaway" (2019) by the Chainsmokers, Illenium and Lennon Stella, "OMG What's Happening" (2020) by Ava Max, and "Heartbreak Anthem" (2021) by Galantis, David Guetta and Little Mix. Furthermore, Sorana has also collaborated with artists such as Alan Walker on "Lost Control" (2018). In 2022, she released her debut single under Atlantic Records, "Redrum" with David Guetta.

== Discography ==
=== As lead artist ===
List of singles as lead artist
Title	Year	Peak chart positions					Album
Title	Year	BUL	CIS	CRO	NLD	RUS	Album
"Povești"	2015	—	—	—	—	—	Non-album singles
"Pijamale"	2015	—	—	—	—	—	Non-album singles
"Hold Your Kite" (with Goldfish)	2018	—	—	—	—	—	Non-album singles
"Bubble Gum" (with VAX)	2018	—	—	—	—	—	Non-album singles
"Jealous" (with Oliver Nelson and Tobtok)	2018	—	—	—	—	—	Non-album singles
"Drowning" (with Franklin and Digital Farm Animals)	2019	—	—	—	—	—	Non-album singles
"Redrum" (with David Guetta)	2022	10	17	26	18	13	Non-album singles
"Karaoke"	2022	—	—	—	—	—	Non-album singles
"Wild Girls"	2022	—	—	—	—	—	Non-album singles
"Stupid Heart"	2023	—	—	—	—	—	Non-album singles
"Fuck Up My Make Up"	2023	—	—	—	—	—	Non-album singles
"I Lied"	2023	—	—	—	—	—	
"Goosebumps"	2024	—	—	—	—	—	
"Don't Send Me Flowers"	2024	—	—	—	—	—	
"Down Low"	2024	—	—	—	—	—	
"Digital Heartbeat"	2024	—	—	—	—	—	
"Feminine Rage"	2024	—	—	—	—	—	
"99% Angel"	2024	—	—	—	—	—	
"Kiss Back"	2025	—	—	—	—	—	
"Mind of a Warrior" (with Alan Walker)	2025	—	—	—	—	—	
"Click Bait"	2025	—	—	—	—	—	
"Void" (with Alan Walker)	2026	—	—	—	—	—	
"These Corporations Are Trying to Kill Me"	2026	—	—	—	—	—	
"SkinCare"	2026	—	—	—	—	—	
"E.T."	2026	—	—	—	—	—	
"—" denotes a release that did not chart or was not released in that territory.

=== As featured artist ===
List of singles as featured artist, with selected chart positions
Title	Year	Peak chart positions	Album
Title	Year	CIS	Album
"Curaj" (Adela Popescu featuring Sorana)	2015	—	Non-album singles
"One On One" (Tujamo featuring Sorana)	2017	167	Non-album singles
"Rooftops (Aber)" (Tobtok featuring Sorana)	2017	—	Non-album singles
"Oasis" (The Him featuring Sorana)	2017	—	Non-album singles
"Enemy" (Sweater Beats featuring Sorana)	2018	—	Non-album singles
"—" denotes a release that did not chart or was not released in that territory.

=== Other charted songs ===
List of other charted songs, with selected chart positions
Title	Year	Peak chart positions							Album
Title	Year	BEL (Fl) Tip	NLD Tip.	NOR	SWE Heat.	SWI	TUR	US Dance/ Elec.	Album
"Lost Control" (with Alan Walker)	2018	16	17	3	1	21	4	28	Different World

== Songwriting credits ==
List of songwriting credits (Note: Sorana has provided songwriting credits on her entire discography apart from "Povești".)
Title	Year	Artist	Album	Notes
"Dream About My Face"	2015	Antonia	Non-album singles	None
"Rurumba (Jungle Beat)"	2017	Morris and Cabral	Non-album singles	None
"Takeaway"	2019	The Chainsmokers and Illenium featuring Lennon Stella	World War Joy / Ascend	None
"Be the One"	2019	Jason Derulo	2Sides (Side 1)	Also provides uncredited lead vocals
"Outta Breath"	2019	Hanna Ferm	Non-album single	None
"OMG What's Happening"	2020	Ava Max	Heaven and Hell	None
"Rumors"	2020	Ava Max	Heaven and Hell	None
"Trust Fall"	2021	Bebe Rexha	Better Mistakes	None
"Heartbreak Anthem"	2021	Galantis, David Guetta and Little Mix	Between Us	None
"Low Low"	2021	WayV and NCT	Non-album single	None
"Beg for You"	2022	Charli XCX featuring Rina Sawayama	Crash	Also provides background vocals
"That Girl"	2023	Rita Ora	You & I	None
"Saucy"	2024	Sistar19	Non-album single	None
"Strawberry Rush"	2024	Chuu	Strawberry Rush	None
"Passionfruit"	2024	Nmixx	Fe3O4: Break	None
"Red Light Sign, But We Go"	2024	Nmixx	Fe3O4: Stick Out	None
"Sexy in the Air"	2024	Taemin	Eternal	None
"Deja Vu"	2024	Taemin	Eternal	None
"Imaginary Friend"	2024	Itzy	Gold	None
"ExtraL"	2025	Jennie featuring Doechii	Ruby	None
"Filter"	2025	Jennie	Ruby	None
"258"	2025	Yeji	Air	None
"Jellyous"	2025	Illit	Bomb	None
"It's Me"	2026	Illit	Mamihlapinatapai	Also provides background vocals
"Pinky Up"	2026	Katseye	Wild	Also provides background vocals
"Saki"	2026	Le Sserafim featuring Aliyah's Interlude	Pureflow Pt. 1	None
"Whip" (휙)	2026	Nmixx (Jiwoo and Kyujin)	Strange Muse	None
"You're Under Arrest" (체포하겠어)	2026	Illit	Break Even	None

== See also ==
- List of music released by Romanian artists that has charted in major music markets
