= Do the Dance =

- Remixes cover

Single by Illit

from the EP Bomb
- Language: Korean
- Released: June 16, 2025
- Genre: Eurodance
- Length: 3:08
- Label: Belift Lab
- Songwriters: "Hitman" Bang; Moa "Cazzi Opeia" Carlebecker (Sunshine); Ellen Berg (Sunshine); Fig Tape; Dyvahh; Frants; Shinkung; Tomoyuki Asakawa; Jang Jeong-won (Jamfactory); Miah (153/Joombas); Bay (153/Joombas); Kim Kiwi; Yunah; Maryjane (Lalala Studio); 4 Seasons (Lee Aeng-du, Kim Chae-ah, and Lee Eun-hwa) (153/Joombas); Huh Yunjin
- Producers: "Hitman" Bang; Frants; Fig Tape; Shinkung; Dyvahh

Illit singles chronology
"Almond Chocolate" (2025)	"Do the Dance" (2025)	"Jellyous" (2025)

Music video
- "Do the Dance" on YouTube

"Do the Dance" (Korean: 빌려온 고양이; RR: Billyeoon goyangi; lit. 'Borrowed cat') is a song recorded by South Korean girl group Illit for their third extended play Bomb. It was released as the EP's lead single by Belift Lab on June 16, 2025.

== Background and release ==
On May 19, 2025, Belift Lab announced that Illit would be releasing their third extended play Bomb on June 16. On May 22, "Do the Dance" was announced as the lead single upon the tracklist reveal, and the highlight medley video previewing the song was released later the same day. A snippet video for the song was released on May 24. On June 13 and 15, music video teasers for the song were released. The song was released alongside its music video and the extended play on June 16. The remixes version was released on June 27. On September 1, the Japanese version of the song was released as part of Illit's first Japanese maxi single "Toki Yo Tomare".

== Composition ==
"Do the Dance" was written and produced by "Hitman" Bang, Frants, Fig Tape, Shinkung and Dyvahh, with Moa "Cazzi Opeia" Carlebecker (Sunshine), Ellen Berg (Sunshine), Tomoyuki Asakawa, Jang Jeong-won (Jamfactory), Miah (153/Joombas), Bay (153/Joombas), Kim Kiwi, Yunah, Maryjane (Lalala Studio), 4 Seasons (Lee Aeng-du, Kim Chae-ah, and Lee Eun-hwa) (153/Joombas) and Huh Yunjin participating in the writing. It is described as a Eurodance song, having "a romantic and dream-like string theme" that samples part of the soundtrack Yūganaru dassō (優雅なる脱走) from the 1989 Japanese anime film The Five Star Stories, giving it a classical musical atmosphere. It also features "addictive hooks and beats", with whimsical, spell-like lyrics that enhance Illit's unique charm.

== Promotion ==
On June 16, 2025, prior to the release of Bomb, Illit held a showcase event aimed at introducing the extended play and its songs, including "Do the Dance". They subsequently performed on four music programs in the first week of promotion: Mnet's M Countdown on June 19, KBS's Music Bank on June 20, MBC's Show! Music Core on June 21, and SBS's Inkigayo on June 22.

== Accolades ==
Music program awards for "Do the Dance"
Program	Date	Ref.
Music Bank	June 27, 2025	
Inkigayo	June 29, 2025	

=== Year-end lists ===
Year-end lists
Publication	List	Rank	Ref.
Idology	Top 20 Songs of 2025	Placed	

== Track listing ==
- Digital download and streaming – Remixes
1. "Billyeoon Goyangi (Do the Dance)" – 3:08
2. "Billyeoon Goyangi (Do the Dance)" (Snail's House remix) – 3:15
3. "Billyeoon Goyangi (Do the Dance)" (Sunlight remix) – 3:15
4. "Billyeoon Goyangi (Do the Dance)" (Fig Tape remix) – 2:35
5. "Billyeoon Goyangi (Do the Dance)" (Breakbot & Irfane remix) – 3:04
6. "Billyeoon Goyangi (Do the Dance)" (slowed + reverb) – 3:55
7. "Billyeoon Goyangi (Do the Dance)" (instrumental) – 3:08

== Credits and personnel ==
Credits adapted from the EP's liner notes.

Studio

- Hybe Studio – recording
- Diver Studio – digital editing
- 77F Studio – digital editing
- The Nest – mixing

Personnel

- Illit – vocals
- Kyungseon – background vocals
- Lara Andersson – background vocals
- Moa "Cazzi Opeia" Carlebecker (Sunshine) – background vocals
- Dyvahh – keyboard, synthesizer, drum programming, vocal arrangement, digital editing
- Frants – keyboard, synthesizer, bass, drum programming
- Fig Tape – keyboard, synthesizer, bass, drum programming
- Shinkung – keyboard, synthesizer
- Woo Min-jeong – digital editing
- Lee Dong-geun – recording engineering
- Lee Seong-hun – recording engineering
- Geoff Swan – mix engineering
- Matt Cahill – mix engineering assistant

== Charts ==
=== Weekly charts ===
Weekly chart performance
Chart (2025)	Peak position
Global 200 (Billboard)	144
Japan (Japan Hot 100)	26
Japan Digital Singles (Oricon)	41
Japan Streaming (Oricon)	44
Singapore Regional (RIAS)	18
South Korea (Circle)	15
South Korea Hot 100 (Billboard)	68
Taiwan (Billboard)	22

=== Monthly charts ===
Monthly chart performance for "Do the Dance"
Chart (2025)	Peak position
South Korea (Circle)	16

=== Year-end charts ===
Year-end chart performance for "Do the Dance"
Chart (2025)	Position
South Korea (Circle)	73

== Release history ==
Release history
Region	Date	Format	Version	Label
Various	June 16, 2025	Digital download; streaming	Original	Belift Lab
Various	June 27, 2025	Digital download; streaming	Remixes	Belift Lab
Various	September 1, 2025	Digital download; streaming	Japanese	Belift Lab
