= Super Real Me =

- Digital cover

EP by Illit
- Released: March 25, 2024
- Length: 9:36
- Languages: Korean; English
- Labels: Belift Lab; Genie; Stone
- Producers: Albin Tangblad; Slow Rabbit; Bang Si-hyuk; Martin; Noh Ju-hwan; Stint

Illit chronology
Super Real Me (2024)	I'll Like You (2024)

Singles from Super Real Me
- 1. "Magnetic" Released: March 25, 2024

Professional ratings
Review scores
Source	Rating
AllMusic	4/5 stars
IZM	3.5/5 stars

Super Real Me is the debut extended play (EP) by South Korean girl group Illit. It was released on March 25, 2024, by Belift Lab. During its first week of release, Super Real Me sold over 380,000 physical copies worldwide. By the end of April, the album's sales had surpassed 500,000 copies.

== Background ==
On February 13, 2024, Belift Lab officially confirmed that Illit will be debuting in March. On February 21, 2024, the label confirmed furthermore that Illit would be debuting with an extended play (EP) with Hybe's chairman starring as the producer of the extended play. On February 26, 2024, the label revealed the name of Illit's extended play debut, Super Real Me, alongside album pre-orders. A week later, the tracklist of the extended play with revealed via social media accounts, with "Magnetic" as the lead single. Eight days later, the highlight medley teaser was revealed. The extended play was released on March 25, 2024, alongside the music video for "Magnetic".

A music video for "Lucky Girl Syndrome" was later released on April 17, 2024.

== Chart performance ==
Super Real Me charted on major US Billboard charts for 12 consecutive weeks.

== Accolades ==
On June 26, 2024, NME celebrated among this EP Illit's song "Lucky Girl Syndrome" in the list of "The 15 Best K-Pop Songs of 2024".

== Track listing ==
Super Real Me track listing
No.	Title	Writer(s)	Producer(s)	Length
1.	"My World"	Albin Tangblad; Lara Andersson; Elin Bergman; Bang Si-hyuk; Ellie Suh (153/Joombas); Moon Yeo-reum (Jam Factory); Vincenzo; Noh Ju-hwan; January 8th; Lee Yi-jin; Choi Bo-ra (153/Joombas)	Tangblad	1:47
2.	"Magnetic"	Slow Rabbit; Bang; Martin; Salem Ilese; Danke; Vincenzo; Lee; Sophie Leigh McBurnie; Lauren Amber Aquilina; Marcus Andersson; Kim Kiwi; Oh Hyun-seon (Lalala Studio); James	Slow Rabbit; Bang; Martin	2:40
3.	"Midnight Fiction"	Noh; Stella Jones; Ryu Hyun-woo; Moon Ji-young (Lalala Studio); Kim Ji-soo (Lalala Studio); Bang; Vincenzo; Danke	Noh	2:48
4.	"Lucky Girl Syndrome"	Stint; Alna Hofmeyr; Annika Bennett; Shinkung; Shin Bo-eun (Jam Factory); Bang; Lee; Noh; Vincenzo; Cha Ri (153/Joombas); Na Do-yeon (153/Joombas)	Stint	2:20
Total length:				9:36

== Charts ==
=== Weekly charts ===
Weekly chart performance for Super Real Me
Chart (2024)	Peak position
Croatian International Albums (HDU)	5
Greek Albums (IFPI)	43
Japanese Albums (Oricon)	3
Japanese Combined Albums (Oricon)	3
Japanese Hot Albums (Billboard Japan)	3
Nigerian Albums (TurnTable)	63
South Korean Albums (Circle)	3
Swiss Albums (Schweizer Hitparade)	94
US Billboard 200	93
US Independent Albums (Billboard)	14
US World Albums (Billboard)	2

=== Monthly charts ===
Monthly chart performance for Super Real Me
Chart (2024)	Position
Japanese Albums (Oricon)	19
South Korean Albums (Circle)	6

=== Year-end charts ===
2024 year-end chart performance for Super Real Me
Chart (2024)	Position
Japanese Download Albums (Billboard Japan)	53
South Korean Albums (Circle)	51

2025 year-end chart performance for Super Real Me
Chart (2025)	Position
Japanese Hot Albums (Billboard Japan)	60

== Certifications ==
Certifications
Region	Certification	Certified units/sales
South Korea (KMCA) Physical	2× Platinum	500,000^{^}
^{^} Shipments figures based on certification alone.

== Release history ==
Release history and formats for Super Real Me
Region	Date	Format	Label	Ref.
Various	March 25, 2024	Digital download; streaming	Belift Lab	
South Korea	March 25, 2024	CD	Belift Lab	
Japan	March 25, 2024	CD	Belift Lab	
United States	March 25, 2024	CD	Belift Lab	
