= Mamihlapinatapai (EP) =

- Digital cover

EP by Illit
- Released: April 30, 2026
- Studios: Hybe Studio (Seoul); Carrot Express (Seoul); Riot Riot Riot (Seoul)
- Length: 13:14
- Languages: Korean; English
- Label: Belift Lab
- Producers: Joonas Laaksoharju; The Wavys; Oliver Ländin; Ido Zmishlany; Dan Farber; Shinkung; Dyvahh; Vincenzo

Illit chronology
Not Cute Anymore (2025)	Mamihlapinatapai (2026)	Break Even (2026)

Singles from Mamihlapinatapai
- 1. "It's Me" Released: April 30, 2026

Professional ratings
Review scores
Source	Rating
AllMusic	4/5 stars
IZM	2.5/5 stars

Mamihlapinatapai is the fourth extended play by South Korean girl group Illit. It was released by Belift Lab on April 30, 2026, and contains five tracks including the lead single "It's Me". The EP incorporates several genres, including drum and bass, techno, electro-pop, pop rock, and alternative pop.

== Background and release ==
On March 16, 2026, Belift Lab announced that Illit's fourth extended play Mamihlapinatapai would be released on April 30, with the lead single titled "It's Me", after it was revealed during the group's first concert tour Press Start in Seoul on the previous two days. The extended play was made available for pre-order on March 31, and the track listing was revealed the same day. On April 3, "Paw Paw" version concept photos and films were released, featuring the members each posing with their representative animal. "GRWM" version concept photos and films were released on April 7, featuring the members doing their makeup in the morning. On April 14, "Free Rider" version concept photos and films were released, depicting the members with an attitude of "lazy perfectionism". The highlight medley video was released on April 21. On April 23, the campaign film for "It's Me" was released, followed by "It's Me" version concept photos and films the following day, featuring the members wearing veils. Music video teasers for "It's Me" were released on April 27 and 28. The extended play was released alongside the music video for "It's Me" on April 30.

== Composition ==
The opening track "GRWM (Get Ready With Me)" is a drum and bass song about "sharing one's innermost feelings without make-up", layered over a gentle melody. The lead single "It's Me" is a techno song about the moment of wondering what your relationship with someone is after a first date, with the members shouting "I'm your bias" over intense beats and softly whispering "It's me". The track combines "a driving beat [and] shimmering synths", incorporating some Bollywood musical styles, and features a "simple, ringing chorus". The third track "Paw, Paw!", co-written by Illit member Iroha, is an electro-pop and hyperpop song with heavy bass contrasting an emotional melody, with lyrics that express affection for a pet. The title track, "Mamihlapinatapai", is a pop rock and synth pop song that conveys a message to youth who have become "lazy perfectionists" when faced with many choices and responsibilities, acting as commentary on the stresses of "group projects and endless to-do lists, the busyness of life". The final track "Love, Older You", co-written by all five members of Illit, is an alternative pop song with a "warm and gentle sensibility", serving as a message from the members to their younger selves.

== Promotion ==
On May 5, 2026, following the extended play's release, Illit held an event in Seoul on Children's Day titled Illit Seoul Children's Grand Park Festival, featuring interactive booths with family-oriented activities and a performance from the group. The group also hosted a pop-up on the first floor of the Hybe building from May 3 to 8, featuring their outfits from the music video and photo shoots.

== Track listing ==
Mamihlapinatapai track listing
No.	Title	Writer(s)	Producer(s)	Length
1.	"GRWM (Get Ready With Me)"	Joonas Laaksoharju; Elias Hjelm; Erika Liu; Moon Yeo-reum (Jam Factory)	Joonas Laaksoharju	2:48
2.	"It's Me"	Jack Brady; Jordan Roman; Sorana; Rollo; The Deep; Youra	The Wavys	2:18
3.	"Paw, Paw!"	Iselin Solheim; Mathilde Nyegaard; Oliver Ländin; "Hitman" Bang; Iroha; Vincenzo; January 8th; Belift Lab Inc.	Oliver Ländin	2:29
4.	"Mamihlapinatapai"	Ido Zmishlany; Dan Farber; Annika Bennett; Blaise Railey; Belift Lab Inc.; Moon Yeo-reum (Jam Factory); Ha Yoon-ah (153/Joombas); Yoon (153/Joombas); Kim Bada (153/Joombas); Kim Soo-ji (Lalala Studio); Bay (153/Joombas); Mia (153/Joombas); Leekyung (Wavecloud); DBLV (Chiller and Owl)	Ido Zmishlany; Dan Farber	3:01
5.	"Love, Older You"	Shinkung; Dyvahh; Vincenzo; Sasha Alex Sloan; Henry Allen; Moon Yeo-reum (Jam Factory); Jang Jeong-won (Jam Factory); Yunah; Minju; Moka; Wonhee; Iroha	Shinkung; Dyvahh; Vincenzo	2:38
Total length:				13:14

== Personnel ==
=== Musicians ===
- Illit – vocals (all tracks)
  - Minju – background vocals (tracks 2, 4), gang vocals (track 4)
  - Yunah – background vocals (track 4), gang vocals (track 4)
  - Moka – gang vocals (track 4)
  - Wonhee – gang vocals (track 4)
  - Iroha – gang vocals (track 4)
- Joonas Laaksoharju – production, keyboards, synthesizer, guitar, bass, drum programming (track 1)
- Elias Hjlem – synthesizer (track 1)
- Erika Liu – background vocals (track 1)
- Dyvahh – digital editing, vocal arrangement (tracks 1, 2); production, synthesizer (track 5)
- Jack Brady – production, keyboards, piano, synthesizer, drum programming, gang vocals (track 2)
- Jordan Roman – production, keyboards, piano, synthesizer, drum programming, gang vocals (track 2)
- Sorana – background vocals, gang vocals (track 2)
- Roland Spreckley a.k.a. Rollo – background vocals, gang vocals (track 2)
- Slow Rabbit – digital editing, vocal arrangement (track 2)
- Shinkung – digital editing, vocal arrangement (tracks 2, 4, 5); production, keyboards (track 5)
- Oliver Ländin – production, instrumentation (track 3)
- Perrie – background vocals (track 3)
- Iselin Solheim – background vocals (track 3)
- Mathilde Nyegaard – background vocals (track 3)
- Vincenzo – digital editing, vocal arrangement (track 3); production, drum programming (track 5)
- Ido Zmishlany – production, instrumentation (track 4)
- Dan Farber – production (track 4)
- Annika Bennett – background vocals (track 4)
- Sophia Pae – background vocals (tracks 4, 5), gang vocals (track 4)
- Jeong Woo-yeong – digital editing (track 4)
- Son Yu-jeong – digital editing (track 4)
- Lee Seung-woo – guitar (track 5)
- Sasha Alex Sloan – background vocals (track 5)
- Lee Yu-na – digital editing (track 5)

=== Technical ===
- Chris Gehringer – mastering (all tracks)
- James F Reynolds – mixing (track 1)
- James Cunningham – mixing assistance (track 1)
- Tom Norris – mixing (track 2)
- Victor Verpillat – mixing assistance (track 2)
- Kevin Grainger – mixing (track 3)
- Jeong Woo-yeong – mixing (track 4)
- Josh Gudwin – mixing (track 5)
- Felix Byrne – mixing assistance (track 5)
- So Yu-jeong – recording engineering (track 1)
- Lee Yu-na – recording engineering (tracks 1, 5)
- Kim Su-jeong – recording engineering (track 2)
- Yang Ha-jeong – recording engineering (tracks 2, 4)
- Lee Dong-geun – recording engineering (track 2)
- Slow Rabbit – recording engineering (track 2)
- Vincenzo – recording engineering (track 3)

== Charts ==
=== Weekly charts ===
Weekly chart performance for Mamihlapinatapai
Chart (2026)	Peak position
Austrian Albums (Ö3 Austria)	63
Belgian Albums (Ultratop Flanders)	25
Belgian Albums (Ultratop Wallonia)	49
Croatian International Albums (HDU)	4
Greek Albums (IFPI)	92
Hungarian Physical Albums (MAHASZ)	16
Japanese Albums (Oricon)	4
Japanese Combined Albums (Oricon)	4
Japanese Hot Albums (Billboard Japan)	3
Slovak Albums (ČNS IFPI)	25
South Korean Albums (Circle)	2
Swedish Physical Albums (Sverigetopplistan)	10
US Billboard 200	26
US World Albums (Billboard)	1

=== Monthly charts ===
Monthly chart performance for Mamihlapinatapai
Chart (2026)	Peak position
Japanese Albums (Oricon)	7
South Korean Albums (Circle)	8

== Certifications ==
Certifications for Mamihlapinatapai
Region	Certification	Certified units/sales
South Korea (KMCA)	2× Platinum	500,000^{^}
^{^} Shipments figures based on certification alone.

== Release history ==
Release history for Mamihlapinatapai
Region	Date	Format	Label
South Korea	April 30, 2026	CD	Belift Lab
Various	April 30, 2026	Digital download; streaming	Belift Lab
