= It's Me (Illit song) =

Single by Illit

from the EP Mamihlapinatapai
- Language: Korean; English
- Released: April 30, 2026
- Genre: Techno
- Length: 2:18
- Label: Belift Lab
- Songwriters: Jack Brady; Jordan Roman; Sorana; Rollo; The Deep; Youra
- Producer: The Wavys

Illit singles chronology
"Bubee" (2026)	"It's Me" (2026)	"Iconic by Mistake" (2026)

Music video
- "It's Me" on YouTube

"It's Me" is a song recorded by South Korean girl group Illit for their fourth extended play Mamihlapinatapai. It was released as the EP's lead single by Belift Lab on April 30, 2026. A techno song, "It's Me" describes the feeling of wondering what your relationship with someone is after a first date.

== Background and release ==
On March 16, 2026, Belift Lab announced that the song titled "It's Me" would serve as the lead single for Illit's fourth extended play Mamihlapinatapai, set for release on April 30, after it was revealed during the group's first concert tour Press Start in Seoul on the previous two days. On March 31, the track listing for the EP was released, revealing "It's Me" as the second track and lead single of the EP. The campaign film for the song was released on April 23, and two music video teasers were released on April 27 and 28, respectively. The song was released alongside its music video upon the release of the extended play on April 30.

== Composition ==
"It's Me" was written by Jack Brady, Jordan Roman, Sorana, Rollo, The Deep and Youra, and was produced by The Wavys. It is a techno song about the moment of wondering what your relationship with someone is after a first date, with the members shouting "I'm your bias" over intense beats and softly whispering "It's me". The song blends "a driving beat [and] shimmering synths", incorporating some Bollywood musical styles, and features a "simple, ringing chorus".

== Promotion ==
Following the release of Mamihlapinatapai, Illit performed "It's Me" on four music programs in the first week of promotion: Mnet's M Countdown on April 30, KBS's Music Bank on May 1, MBC's Show! Music Core on May 2, and SBS's Inkigayo on May 3. On May 5, Illit held an event in Seoul on Children's Day titled Illit Seoul Children's Grand Park Festival, featuring interactive booths with family-oriented activities and a performance from the group. The group also hosted a pop-up on the first floor of the Hybe building from May 3 to 8, where fans can view their outfits featured in the song's music video.

== Accolades ==
On South Korean music programs, "It's Me" received four first place awards, including a triple crown on Inkigayo.

Music program awards for "It's Me"
Program	Date	Ref.
Inkigayo	June 7, 2026	
Inkigayo	June 14, 2026	
Inkigayo	June 21, 2026	
Show! Music Core	June 6, 2026	

Awards and nominations for "It's Me"
Award show	Year	Category	Result	Ref.
MAMA Awards	2026	Best Dance Performance Female Group	Won	
MAMA Awards	2026	Best Choreography	Nominated	
MAMA Awards	2026	Song of The Year	Nominated	
MAMA Awards	2026	Best Song Top 10	Won	
Melon Music Awards	2026	Song of The Year	Nominated	

== Credits and personnel ==
All credits adapted from the liner notes of Mamihlapianatapai.

- Illit – vocals
  - Minju – background vocals
- Jack Brady – production, songwriting, keyboards, piano, synthesizer, drum programming, gang vocals
- Jordan Roman – production, songwriting, keyboards, piano, synthesizer, drum programming, gang vocals
- Sorana – songwriting, background vocals, gang vocals
- Roland Spreckley a.k.a. Rollo – songwriting, background vocals, gang vocals
- The Deep – songwriting
- Youra – songwriting
- Dyvahh – digital editing, vocal arrangement
- Slow Rabbit – digital editing, vocal arrangement, recording engineering
- Shinkung – digital editing, vocal arrangement
- Tom Norris – mixing
- Chris Gehringer – mastering
- Victor Verpillat – mixing assistance
- Kim Su-jeong – recording engineering
- Yang Ha-jeong – recording engineering
- Lee Dong-geun – recording engineering

== Charts ==
=== Weekly charts ===
Weekly chart performance for "It's Me"
Chart (2026)	Peak position
Global 200 (Billboard)	67
Hong Kong (Billboard)	19
Japan Combined Singles (Oricon)	9
Japan Hot 100 (Billboard)	7
New Zealand Hot Singles (RMNZ)	10
Panama Streaming (PRODUCE)	1708
Singapore (RIAS)	24
South Korea (Circle)	2
Taiwan (Billboard)	7
US Hot Dance/Pop Songs (Billboard)	10
US World Digital Song Sales (Billboard)	8
Vietnam Hot 100 (Billboard)	93

=== Monthly charts ===
Monthly chart performance for "It's Me"
Chart (2026)	Position
South Korea (Circle)	3

== Release history ==
Release history for "It's Me"
Region	Date	Format	Label
Various	April 30, 2026	Digital download; streaming	Belift Lab
