= Iconic by Mistake =

Single by Le Sserafim, Illit and Katseye
- Language: English
- Released: June 12, 2026
- Genre: Alternative pop
- Length: 2:57
- Label: Belift; Source; Hybe UMG; Geffen
- Songwriters: Sean Cook; Alice Longyu Gao; Madison Love; Brandon Colbein; Justin Tranter; Dyvahh; Amanda Ibanez; Alyx Mendoza; McKay Stevens
- Producers: Sean Cook; McKay Stevens; Dyvahh

Le Sserafim singles chronology
| "Boompala" (2026) | "Iconic by Mistake" (2026) | "Made My Night" (2026) |

Illit singles chronology
| "It's Me" (2026) | "Iconic by Mistake" (2026) | "I Got Your Back" (2026) |

Katseye singles chronology
| "Pinky Up" (2026) | "Iconic by Mistake" (2026) | "Animal" (2026) |

Music video
- "Iconic by Mistake" on YouTube

"Iconic by Mistake" (stylized in all caps) is a song by South Korean girl groups Le Sserafim and Illit, and the Los Angeles–based girl group Katseye. It was released by Belift Lab, Source Music, Hybe UMG and Geffen Records on June 12, 2026, as the first collaboration single by the three groups. An accompanying music video was released on June 10. It reached the top ten in Singapore and Malaysia.

== Background ==
On June 7, 2026, Le Sserafim, Illit, and Katseye announced that they would release "Iconic by Mistake" as a "collaboration single" on June 12. A teaser released on June 8 featured a golden tooth being thrown into a power socket, a windstorm, and a visit to the dentist, followed by a bloody nose running over a mouth with braces with the word "iconic" written on them. It also included corn turning into popcorn, security guards looking at a surveillance system, and one of the members kissing a broken statue.

== Composition ==
"Iconic by Mistake" features lyrics in which the members address their haters and main criticisms towards the three groups, which ultimately contributed to their rise in fame. It is described as alternative pop with "irregular" sounds. It runs at a tempo of 150 bpm in D-Major with a 4/4 time signature.

== Music video ==
The music video for "Iconic by Mistake" was directed by Cody Critcheloe. It was released on June 10, 2026, on the official Hybe YouTube channel. It combines goth, psychedelic and hyperpop visuals. Hannah Dailey of Billboard called the "cinematic" video "visually stunning" featuring the girl group members appearing in a series of chaotic settings.

== Live performances ==
Le Sserafim, Illit and Katseye first performed "Iconic by Mistake" on the June 11 broadcast of M Countdown.

== Critical reception ==
Professional ratings
Review scores
| Source | Rating |
|---|---|
| IZM | 2/5 stars |

Park Seung-min of IZM rated the song 2 out of 5 stars. He wrote that it is "unnatural" and "awkward".

== Accolades ==
Awards & Nominations for "Iconic by Mistake"
| Award Show | Year | Category | Results | Ref. |
|---|---|---|---|---|
| Berlin Commercial Festival | 2026 | Craft: Editing | Nominated | |
| Grindr Unwrapped Awards | 2026 | Music Video of the Year | Pending | |
| MAMA Awards | 2026 | Best Collaboration | Pending | |

Music program awards for "Iconic by Mistake"
| Program | Date | Ref. |
|---|---|---|
| M Countdown | June 25, 2026 | |
| M Countdown | July 9, 2026 | |

== Track listing ==
- Digital download and streaming
1. "Iconic by Mistake" – 2:57
2. "Iconic by Mistake" (clean edit) – 2:57
3. "Iconic by Mistake" (instrumental) – 2:57

== Credits and personnel ==
Credits are adapted from Apple Music.

- Le Sserafim, Illit, and Katseye – vocals
- Sean Cook – songwriter, bass, keyboards, guitar, synthesizer, drum programming, vocal producer
- McKay Stevens – songwriter, keyboards, producer
- Madison Love – songwriter
- Alice Longyu Gao – songwriter
- Justin Tranter – songwriter
- Brandon Colbein – songwriter
- Alyx Mendoza – songwriter
- Amanda Ibanez– songwriter
- Dyvahh – songwriter, keyboards, producer
- Score (13) – vocal arranger
- Megatone (13) – vocal arranger
- Vincenzo – vocal arranger, recording engineer
- Bart Schoudel – vocal arranger, vocal producer
- Kim Jun Hyuk – editing engineer
- Mark Parfitt – recording engineer
- Raul Lopez – mixing engineer
- Chris Gehringer – mastering engineer
- Yang Ha Jeong – recording engineer
- Kyle Miller – recording engineer
- Will Quinnell – assistant mastering engineer
- Yang Ga – immersive mixing engineer, immersive mastering engineer

== Charts ==
=== Weekly charts ===
Weekly chart performance for "Iconic by Mistake"
| Chart (2026) | Peak position |
|---|---|
| Australia (ARIA) | 39 |
| Canada Hot 100 (Billboard) | 46 |
| China (TME Korean) | 17 |
| France (SNEP) | 159 |
| Germany (GfK) | 99 |
| Global 200 (Billboard) | 23 |
| Greece International (IFPI) | 34 |
| Hong Kong (Billboard) | 9 |
| Ireland (IRMA) | 39 |
| Japan Hot 100 (Billboard) | 38 |
| Lithuania (AGATA) | 67 |
| Malaysia (IFPI) | 4 |
| Malaysia International (RIM) | 3 |
| Netherlands (Single Top 100) | 59 |
| New Zealand (Recorded Music NZ) | 29 |
| Panama Streaming (PRODUCE) | 109 |
| Peru Anglo Airplay (Monitor Latino) | 11 |
| Philippines Hot 100 (Billboard Philippines) | 43 |
| Poland Streaming (OLiS) | 50 |
| Portugal (AFP) | 56 |
| Singapore (RIAS) | 3 |
| South Korea (Circle) | 123 |
| Sweden Heatseeker (Sverigetopplistan) | 3 |
| Taiwan (Billboard) | 6 |
| United Arab Emirates (IFPI) | 15 |
| UK Singles (Official Charts) | 22 |
| UK Indie (Official Charts) | 3 |
| US Billboard Hot 100 | 38 |
| Vietnam Hot 100 (Billboard) | 57 |

=== Monthly charts ===
Monthly chart performance
| Chart (2026) | Peak position |
|---|---|
| Panama Streaming (PRODUCE) | 234 |

== Release history ==
Release history for "Iconic by Mistake"
| Region | Date | Format | Label |
|---|---|---|---|
| Various | June 12, 2026 | Digital download; streaming | Belift; Source; Hybe UMG; Geffen |
