= Illit =

South Korean girl group

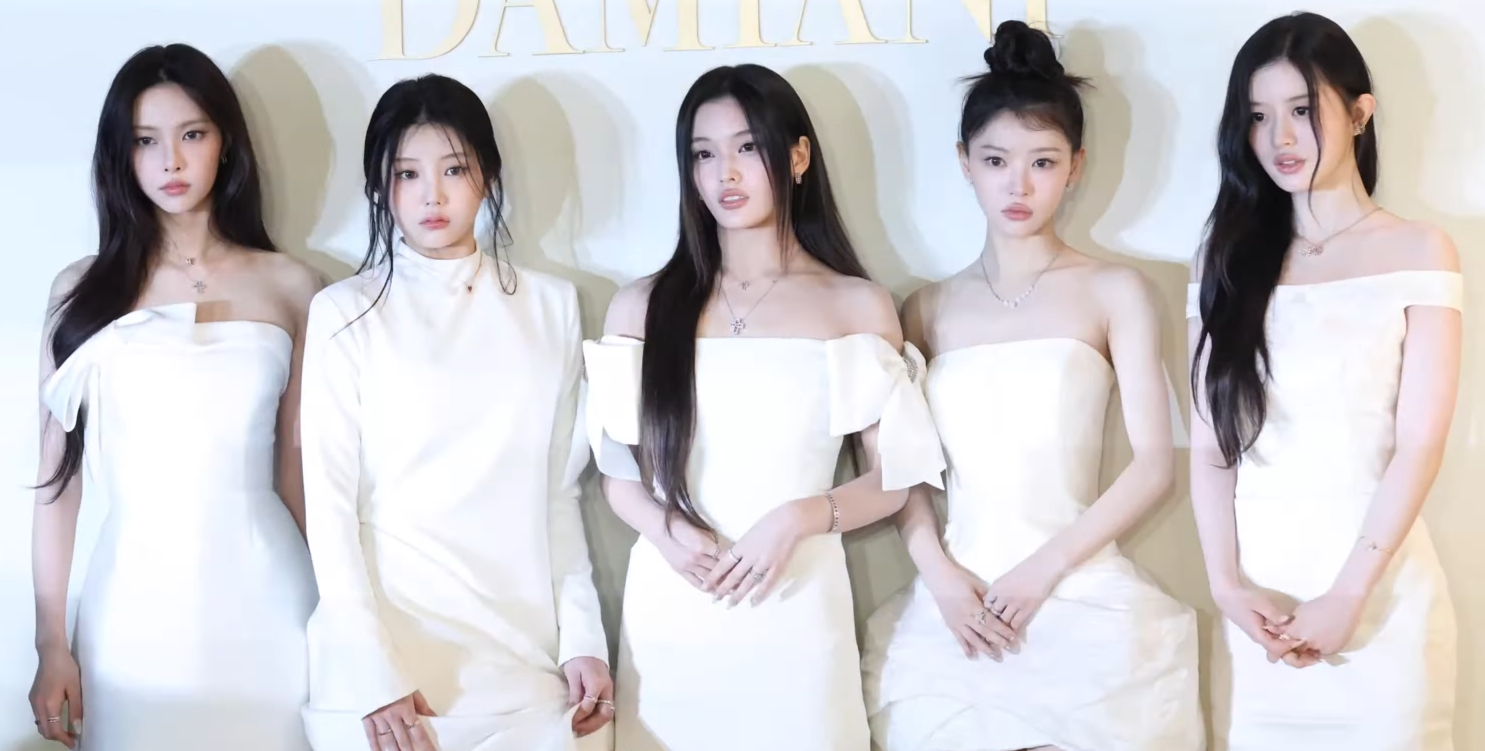
- Illit in January 2026; L–R: Yunah, Wonhee, Iroha, Moka, and Minju

Background information
- Origin: Seoul, South Korea
- Genre: K-pop
- Works: Discography
- Years active: 2024–present
- Labels: Belift; Polydor/Universal
- Awards: Full list
- Members: Yunah; Minju; Moka; Wonhee; Iroha
- Website: beliftlab.com/illit

Illit (/ˈaɪlɪt/; EYE-lit; Korean: 아일릿; RR: Aillit; stylized in all caps) is a South Korean girl group. Formed by Belift Lab, a sub-label of Hybe, through the 2023 JTBC survival competition show R U Next?, the group consists of five members: Yunah, Minju, Moka, Wonhee, and Iroha. The group debuted on March 25, 2024, with the extended play (EP) Super Real Me. Their debut single, "Magnetic", was widely successful, topping South Korea's Circle Digital Chart and entering numerous charts overseas.

== Name ==
Illit's official logo

The name I'll-It was introduced during the live broadcast of the final episode of R U Next?. It was described as representing the idea of choosing a verb to place between "I'll" and "it", reflecting the members' ability to act independently and make their own decisions.

== Career ==
=== 2023–2024: Pre-debut activities and formation through R U Next? ===
The JTBC series R U Next? aired for ten episodes from June 30, through September 1, 2023, in which 22 contestants competed to debut in a six-member girl group under Belift Lab, their first girl group, and the third girl group to debut under Hybe, after Le Sserafim and NewJeans. The final episode saw the formation of the group's six-member lineup, with two members being selected by the public, and four being selected by the company's producers. The final lineup of Wonhee, Youngseo, Minju, Iroha, Moka, and Yunah, was unveiled at the end of the broadcast. On January 5, 2024, Belift Lab announced Youngseo was leaving the group, based on a mutual agreement to terminate her contract and leave the group before its debut.

=== 2024: Debut with Super Real Me, I'll Like You ===
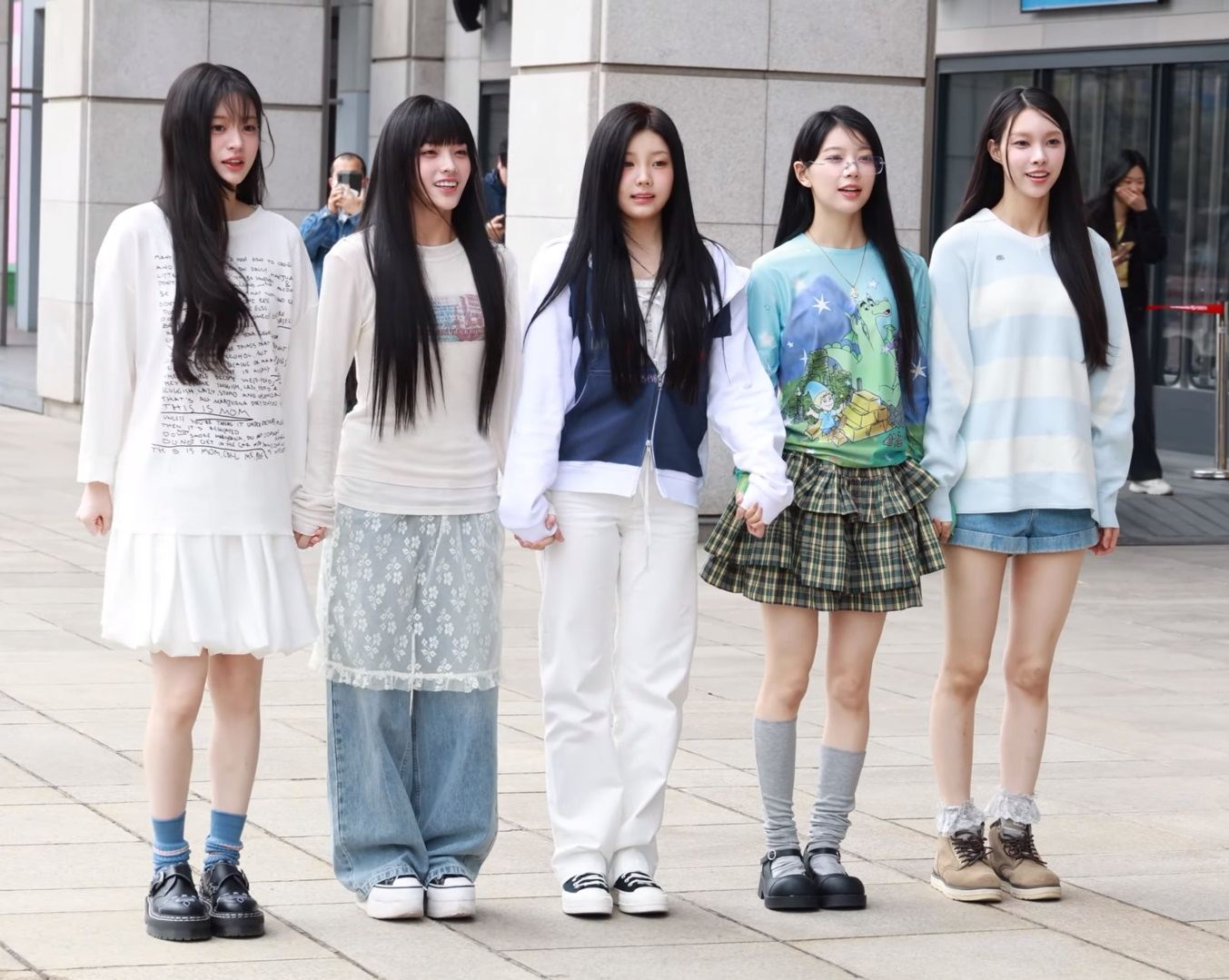
Illit promoting Super Real Me in March 2024

On February 13, 2024, Belift Lab confirmed that Illit would be debuting in March. On February 21, it was confirmed again that Illit would debut on March 25 with their first extended play (EP), with Hybe's chairman Bang Si-hyuk participating as producer of their album. On February 26, the agency announced the name of Illit's first EP Super Real Me, with pre-orders opening on the same day as the announcement. On February 28, Illit made their first public appearance as a group at the Acne Studios show during Paris Fashion Week, making them the first K-pop artist to appear at the event prior to their official debut. The tracklist of Super Real Me was revealed a week later on March 9, with "Magnetic" serving as the lead single. A total of four tracks, including "Magnetic", would be released. The three other tracks on the album are "My World", "Midnight Fiction", and "Lucky Girl Syndrome". The teaser for the music video of their upcoming debut single "Magnetic", was officially released on March 22.

"Magnetic" topped South Korea's Circle Digital Chart, and eight days after its release it entered four U.S. Billboard charts. Illit became the first K-pop group to enter the UK Official Singles with their debut single, which peaked at number 80. On April 16, Illit became the fastest K-pop act to appear on the Billboard Hot 100, when "Magnetic" debuted at number 91. "Magnetic" also became the first debut song by a K-pop act to appear on the Hot 100. The music video for the track "Lucky Girl Syndrome" was released on April 17. In May 2024, Super Real Me entered the Billboard 200 chart at number 93. Additionally, Illit also peaked at number 41 on the Billboard Artist 100 chart, and peaked at number two on the Emerging Artist chart. On June 28, Billboard named Illit as their first ever "K-Pop Rookie of the Month".

On September 23, Belift Lab confirmed that the group would release their second EP I'll Like You on October 21. A comeback album showcase took place two days after the album's official release date. The album debuted on the Billboard 200 chart and ranked 94th on the list. On November 22, Illit released the English version of "Tick-Tack", titled "Baby It's Both" featuring Ava Max.

=== 2025–present: Bomb, Mamihlapinatapai and Break Even ===
On February 14, 2025, Illit released their first original Japanese song "Almond Chocolate", which was included in the soundtrack of the Japanese live-action movie It Takes More Than a Pretty Face to Fall in Love, based on the manga of the same name. A Korean version of the song was later released on March 10.

In May, Illit members Yunah and Minju were announced to be featured in the song "See U Tonight" by American singer Kylie Cantrall from her first EP B.O.Y. On May 19, Belift Lab confirmed that the group would release their third EP Bomb on June 16. The group held a showcase on the EP's release date, performing the lead single "Do the Dance" for the first time. A music video for "Jellyous" was released on July 6, which was followed by the release of a version of the song featuring Canadian singer Sophie Powers in August. Bomb became Illit's third EP to sell 250,000 copies via Circle Chart, earning a Platinum certification from the KMCA.

On July 14, Belift Lab announced that Illit would be releasing their first Japanese maxi single "Toki Yo Tomare" (時よ止まれ; lit. 'Stop time') on September 1. The single consists of four songs: two new songs, "Toki Yo Tomare" and "Topping", alongside a Japanese version of "Do the Dance", and "Almond Chocolate" which was previously released in February. "Topping" was pre-released on August 11. On November 4, Illit released "Secret Quest", serving as the ending theme song for the animated series Pokémon Horizons – Rising Hope. Their first single album, Not Cute Anymore, was released on November 24.

On January 13, 2026, they released their second Japanese single "Sunday Morning", which also serves as the opening theme for the second season of the anime series 'Tis Time for "Torture," Princess. On March 15, during a concert in Seoul on their Press Start tour, Illit revealed that they would be releasing their fourth EP Mamihlapinatapai on April 30, with the lead single "It's Me". On June 12, Illit released the single "Iconic by Mistake" in collaboration with Hybe label mates Le Sserafim and Katseye, a first collaboration between the groups. On June 14, during a concert in Aichi on the same tour, Illit revealed that they would be releasing their second Japanese single, "I Got Your Back", on July 26 featuring Jisoo and Momoka of Hana; a Korean version of the song was released on August 17. On September 21, the song "Swingin' Magic" was released, to be used as the theme song for anime Magical Sisters LuluttoLilly.

Illit released their fifth EP Break Even on October 26. Its lead single, "You're Under Arrest", was performed a week ahead of its release at a concert in Incheon.

On November 18, Belift Lab announced that the group would scale back its promotional schedule due to health concerns involving several members. Yunah, Minju, and Wonhee had recently visited a hospital after developing high fevers and flu-like symptoms, with doctors advising them to get sufficient rest and recover. Meanwhile, Wonhee and Iroha were also receiving treatment for ankle injuries. As a result, the group would reduce its scheduled activities, including music show appearances for its fifth mini-album, Break Even, the following week. The label also addressed Illit's scheduled appearance at the 2026 MAMA Awards on November 20, saying it would coordinate with the organizers. The agency explained, "For the MAMA Awards and certain other previously confirmed official activities, the extent and format of the members' participation will be adjusted as needed based on their health on the day of the events."

== Artistry ==
Illit debuted with a concept based on the "authentic feelings of teenage girls", differing from "complex" backstories often presented in previous K-pop acts. Pop culture critic Kim Do-heon suggested that Illit's success can be attributed to their emphasis on the "theme of relatability," which contributed to the development of their musical identity.

=== Plagiarism allegations ===
In April 2024, Illit's management and producers were publicly accused of plagiarism by NewJeans' executive producer Min Hee-jin. Illit's management refuted the allegations and filed a complaint for defamation. Later in October, Belift Lab CEO Kim Tae-ho appeared at the National Assembly where he further refuted the claims.

== Endorsements ==
In March 2024, Illit was selected as the new face of Acne Studios' SS24 global campaign. On March 28, the group was selected as the new Y brand model of KT Y. Wonhee was announced as a new model for Japanese sports drink Pocari Sweat in April. On May 1, Illit became the new model for the French cosmetics brand Bioderma, and on May 28, the group was announced as the new model for the American footwear company Crocs.

On February 10, 2025, Moka and Iroha were announced as new Tone Up UV ambassador for La Roche-Posay. On March 8, Illit was announced as the new brand ambassador for Lacoste Japan. On March 26, it was announced that Illit became the new face of Pocari Sweat. On July 3, it was announced that Illit became the official brand ambassador of Candy Magic, a contact lens brand from Japan. On July 10, it was announced that Illit became the new ambassador of M&M's in Asia, being the first K-pop group involved with the brand. On August 1, Superdry & Co announced that the group would be the new ambassador of the brand in Korea. On September 29, Uniqlo announced that the group would be the new ambassador of the brand in Japan. On October 22, Illit was appointed as the ambassador for Hoshino Resort. On February 24, 2026, Rockfish Weatherwear announced the "Illit x Rockfish Weatherwear" Dreamscape collection, a collaboration with the group.

== Members ==
- Yunah (윤아)
- Minju (민주)
- Moka (모카) (もか)
- Wonhee (원희)
- Iroha (이로하) (いろは)

=== Timeline ===
On April 20, 2026, Moka temporarily suspended activities due to symptoms of anxiety and excessive tension. Although she briefly returned in late May, she entered a second temporary hiatus for the same health concerns on June 19, 2026.

== Discography ==
Extended plays

- Super Real Me (2024)
- I'll Like You (2024)
- Bomb (2025)
- Mamihlapinatapai (2026)
- Break Even (2026)

== Videography ==
=== Music videos ===
List of music videos, showing year released, and name of the director(s)
Title	Year	Director(s)	Ref.
"Magnetic"	2024	DQM	
"Lucky Girl Syndrome"	2024	Kim In Tae (AFF)	
"Cherish (My Love)"	2024	Hasegawa Anderson (Digipedi)	
"Tick-Tack"	2024	Yuann	
"Almond Chocolate"	2025	DQM	
"Little Monster"	2025	Show Yanagisawa	
"Do the Dance" (빌려온 고양이)	2025	Zac Dov Wiesel	
"Jellyous"	2025	Ha Jung-hoon (Hattrick)	
"Toki Yo Tomare" (時よ止まれ)	2025	Minjae Kim	
"Not Cute Anymore"	2025	Kwanggoeng Yu	
"Sunday Morning"	2026	SugarSpunSister Jinseul	
"Not Me"	2026	Yunah Sheep	
"It's Me"	2026	Yvng Wing (Idiots)	
"Iconic by Mistake" (with Le Sserafim and Katseye)	2026	Cody Critcheloe	
"I Got Your Back" (featuring Jisoo and Momoka of Hana)	2026	Xavier Tera	
"You're Under Arrest" (체포하겠어)	2026	Yvng Wing (Idiots)	

== Filmography ==
=== Television shows ===
Television shows appearances
Year	Title	Notes	Ref.
2023	R U Next?	Reality competition show that determined the members of Illit	
2024	Illit: I'll (Show) It	Debut show	

=== Web shows ===
Web shows appearances
Year	Title	Notes	Ref.
2023	I'll Like It!	Pre-debut reality show; 6 episodes	
2023–present	Behind-It	Behind the scenes of the members' activities	
2024	I'll-it Ready	Pre-debut reality show; 4 episodes	
2024	Super Real Illit	Documentary of the group's debut preparations; 3 episodes	
2024	10 Minute Debate	Variety show content; 5 episodes	
2024	Super Illit	Weekly variety shows; 7 episodes	
2024	The Night of Illit	Weekly variety shows; 6 episodes	
2024–present	Beside-It	Behind the scenes shorts of the members' activities	
2024–present	Log-It	Vlog content of the members	
2025	I'll Like It! 2	Reality show; 4 episodes	
2025	It's Okay to be Slow	Variety show content; 3 episodes	
2025	The Genre is Illit: Youth Studies 101	Variety show content; 2 episodes	
2025	I am HOLO	Variety show content; 2 episodes	
2025	Lit-pouch	Variety show content	

== Live performances ==
=== Concerts ===
List of concerts, showing event names, dates, cities, countries, venues and attendance
Event name	Date	City	Country	Venue	Ref.
Glitter Day	June 7, 2025	Seoul	South Korea	Olympic Hall	
Glitter Day	June 8, 2025	Seoul	South Korea	Olympic Hall	
Glitter Day	August 10, 2025	Yokohama	Japan	Pia Arena MM	
Glitter Day	August 11, 2025	Yokohama	Japan	Pia Arena MM	
Glitter Day	September 3, 2025	Osaka	Japan	Osaka-jo Hall	
Glitter Day	September 4, 2025	Osaka	Japan	Osaka-jo Hall	
Glitter Day	November 8, 2025	Seoul	South Korea	Olympic Hall	
Glitter Day	November 9, 2025	Seoul	South Korea	Olympic Hall	
Press Start	March 14, 2026	Seoul	South Korea	TicketLink Live Arena	
Press Start	March 15, 2026	Seoul	South Korea	TicketLink Live Arena	
Press Start	June 13, 2026	Aichi	Japan	Aichi Prefectural Art Theater	
Press Start	June 14, 2026	Aichi	Japan	Aichi Prefectural Art Theater	
Press Start	June 20, 2026	Osaka	Japan	Orix Theater	
Press Start	June 21, 2026	Osaka	Japan	Orix Theater	
Press Start	June 29, 2026	Fukuoka	Japan	Fukuoka Sunpalace	
Press Start	June 30, 2026	Fukuoka	Japan	Fukuoka Sunpalace	
Press Start	July 18, 2026	Hyogo	Japan	Glion Arena Kobe	
Press Start	July 19, 2026	Hyogo	Japan	Glion Arena Kobe	
Press Start	July 23, 2026	Tokyo	Japan	Toyota Arena Tokyo	
Press Start	July 25, 2026	Tokyo	Japan	Toyota Arena Tokyo	
Press Start	July 26, 2026	Tokyo	Japan	Toyota Arena Tokyo	
Press Start	August 22, 2026	Hong Kong		AsiaWorld-Expo Hall 10	

=== Other performances ===
List of performances, showing event dates, names, cities, countries and performed song(s)
Date	Event	City	Country	Performed song(s)	Ref.
May 3, 2024	Rakuten GirlsAward 2024	Shibuya	Japan	"My World", "Magnetic", and "Lucky Girl Syndrome"	
May 12, 2024	KCON Japan 2024	Chiba	Japan	"Magnetic", "Lucky Girl Syndrome", and "What Is Love?" (orig. Twice)	
June 2, 2024	K-Wave Concert Inkigayo	Incheon	South Korea	"Magnetic", and "Lucky Girl Syndrome"	
June 15, 2024	Weverse Con Festival 2024	Incheon	South Korea	"Magnetic", "Midnight Fiction", "Lucky Girl Syndrome", and "When We Disco" with J. Y. Park (orig. J. Y. Park and Sunmi)	
June 29 to 30, 2024	Show! Music Core in Japan 2024	Tokorozawa, Saitama	Japan	"Magnetic", and "Lucky Girl Syndrome"	
July 6, 2024	The Music Day 2024	Chiba	Japan	"Magnetic"	
July 19, 2024	5th Tencent Music Entertainment Awards	Cotai, Macau	China	"My World", "Lucky Girl Syndrome", "Midnight Fiction", and "Magnetic"	
July 21, 2024	2024 SBS Gayo Daejeon Summer	Incheon	South Korea	"Lucky Girl Syndrome", "Magnetic" (festival version), and "Plot Twist" (orig. TWS)	
August 12, 2024	2024 Ulsan Summer Festival X MBC Show!	Ulsan	South Korea	"Magnetic", and "Lucky Girl Syndrome"	
August 22, 2024	2024 K World Dream Awards	Seoul	South Korea	"Magnetic (Starlight Remix)"	
August 22, 2024	NHK Music Expo 2024	Shibuya	Japan	"Magnetic"	
September 22, 2024	Korea-Japan Festival 2024	Seoul	South Korea	"Magnetic", "Lucky Girl Syndrome", "My World", and "Midnight Fiction"	
September 28, 2024	KCON Germany 2024	Frankfurt	Germany	"Lucky Girl Syndrome" (Special KCON Germany version), "My World", and "Magnetic" (Special KCON Germany Dream Stage version with GLLITz (fans))	
October 12, 2024	SBS Inkigayo Live in Tokyo 2024	Chūō-ku, Saitama	Japan	"Magnetic", "My World", and "Lucky Girl Syndrome"	
October 25, 2024	K-pop World Festival 2024	Changwon	South Korea	"Cherish (My Love)", and "IYKYK (If You Know You Know)"	
November 21, 2024	2024 MAMA Awards	Los Angeles	United States	"Heart Shaker" (orig. Twice), "Magnetic", and "Cherish (My Love)"	
December 15, 2024	Music Bank Global Festival in Japan 2024	Fukuoka	Japan	"Tick-Tack", and "Magnetic (Starlight Remix)"	
December 25, 2024	2024 SBS Gayo Daejeon Winter	Incheon	South Korea	"IYKYK (If You Know You Know)", and "Magnetic (Holiday ver.)"	
December 31, 2024	75th NHK Kōhaku Uta Gassen	Shibuya	Japan	"Magnetic"	
May 31–June 1, 2025	2025 Weverse Con Festival	Incheon	South Korea	"Tick-Tack", "IYKYK", "I'll Like You", "Almond Chocolate (Korean Ver.)", "Cherish (My Love)", "Magnetic" and "ID; Peace B (song)" (orig. BoA)	
September 14, 2025	Rock in Japan Festival	Soga Sports Park in Chiba	Japan	Performing 11 songs with a full live band including "Toki Yo Tomare," "Cherish (My Love)," and "oops	
September 28, 2025	2025 LCK season finals (Minju only)	Incheon	South Korea	"Bite Marks" (orig. Teya) and "Here, Tomorrow" (orig. Kevin Penkin and Lilas Ikuta)	

== Accolades ==
Illit received several awards following their debut in 2024, including Best New Artist at the MAMA Awards, New Artist of the Year at the Melon Music Awards, and Rookie Artist of the Year at the Golden Disc Awards. Their debut single "Magnetic" also won Best Digital Song at the Golden Disc Awards. Internationally, the group received the New Artist Award at the Japan Record Awards in 2024, and Best New Artist (K-pop) at the iHeartRadio Music Awards in 2025. They subsequently won Best Performance - Female at the 2025 Melon Music Awards.
