= Break Even (EP) =

- Digital cover

EP by Illit
- Released: October 26, 2026
- Length: 11:16
- Languages: Korean; English
- Label: Belift Lab
- Producers: Elie; Tehya; Lawzy; "Hitman" Bang; Frants; Nightfeelings; Slow Rabbit; EQ; Dave Hamelin; Ink

Illit chronology
Mamihlapinatapai (2026)	Break Even (2026)

Singles from Break Even
- 1. "You're Under Arrest" Released: October 26, 2026

Break Even is the fifth extended play by South Korean girl group Illit. It was released by Belift Lab on October 26, 2026, and contains four tracks including the lead single "You're Under Arrest". The EP incorporates dance, speed garage, electro-pop and baile funk genres, and is Illit's first album as a four-member group due to member Moka being on hiatus for health reasons.

== Title ==
The title Break Even is derived from the financial term "break-even point", which refers to a situation in which total revenue equals total costs, resulting in neither a profit nor a loss. According to Belift Lab, the album applies this concept to personal relationships, expressing the idea of no longer investing time and emotions in relationships that do not reciprocate those efforts. The title reflects the album's central theme of recognizing imbalances in relationships and choosing not to continue investing in them.

== Background and release ==
On September 14, 2026, Belift Lab announced that Illit would be releasing their fifth extended play Break Even on October 26. On September 28, the track listing was revealed, confirming that the song "You're Under Arrest" was to serve as the lead single. The "Burning" version concept film for the EP was released later the same day. On the following day, the promotion schedule was released. Individual member "Burning" version concept films were released from September 29 to October 2, followed by the release of "Burning" version concept photos on October 3. A teasing video for the EP, featuring snippets of the songs, was released on October 5. "Gllit", "Quiet", and "Mad" version concept photos were released on October 6, 12, and 15 respectively. On October 23, a music video teaser for "You're Under Arrest" was released. The extended play was released on October 26, alongside the music video for "You're Under Arrest".

== Composition and lyrics ==
The first track, "Super in Love", is a "dreamy" indie dance song, and "More" is a speed garage track featuring "dynamic rhythms". The lead single, "You're Under Arrest", is an electro-pop song featuring a "cheerful whistle" sound, and the final track, "Pop" is a baile funk track with an "unpredictable melody" and "groovy rhythm". Lyrically, Break Even presents an emotional arc across the four tracks.

== Promotion ==
From October 26 to 31, 2026, a pop up store was hosted on the first floor of the Hybe building to commemorate the album's release.

== Track listing ==
Break Even track listing
No.	Title	Writer(s)	Producer(s)	Length
1.	"Super in Love"	Annika Bennett; "Hitman" Bang; Elie; Frants; Tehya; Lawzy; Sasha Alex Sloan; Henry Allen; Jasper Harris; Mia (153/Joombas); Danke; Leekyung; Belift Lab Inc.; Kim Su-ji (Lalala Studio); Liljune; Shinkung; Sohlhee; Moon Seoul (MUMW)	Elie; Tehya; Lawzy; "Hitman" Bang; Frants	2:59
2.	"More"	Nick Weiss; Cecile Believe; Jesse Saint John; "Hitman" Bang; Frants; Brooke Candy; Baseck; Lee Aeng-du (153/Joombas); Belift Lab Inc.; Moon Ji-young (Lalala Studio); Kelbyul (153/Joombas); Jonjon (XYXX); January 8th; Mia (153/Joombas); Crystal Tea; Moon Yeo-reum (Jam Factory); Lee Soo-bin (153/Joombas); Ahn Young-ju (MUMW); Lee Geu-rin (Lalala Studio); Leekyung	Nightfeelings; "Hitman" Bang; Frants	2:53
3.	"You're Under Arrest" (체포하겠어; Chepohagesseo)	"Hitman" Bang; Slow Rabbit; Estratosfera; Qiri; Sorana; Rollo; Iselin Solheim; Mathilde Nyegaard; Fig Tape; Blush Davis; Nathan Fertig; Aaron Theodore Berton; Matthew Crawford; Melanie Fontana; GG Ramirez; Lindgren; Ned Houston; Tim Tan; Tomatomat; Emma Rosen; Yunah	"Hitman" Bang; Slow Rabbit; EQ	3:01
4.	"Pop"	Dave Hamelin; Atia Boggs; Bava; Celine Polenghi; Jin Jin; "Hitman" Bang; Frants; Slow Rabbit; Lee Soo-bin (153/Joombas); Kelbyul (153/Joombas); Tatte; Moon Yeo-reum (Jam Factory); Danke; Cho Yu-ri; 3! (Lalala Studio); Oh Hyun-sun (Lalala Studio); Belift Lab Inc.; Mia (153/Joombas)	Dave Hamelin; Ink; "Hitman" Bang; Frants; Slow Rabbit	2:23
Total length:				11:16

== Charts ==
=== Weekly charts ===
Weekly chart performance for Break Even
Chart (2026)	Peak position
Austrian Albums (Ö3 Austria)	11
Belgian Albums (Ultratop Flanders)	4
Belgian Albums (Ultratop Wallonia)	10
Croatian International Albums (HDU)	3
German Albums (Offizielle Top 100)	62
Greek Albums (IFPI)	43
Japanese Albums (Oricon)	4
Japanese Combined Albums (Oricon)	4
Japanese Hot Albums (Billboard Japan)	4
Portuguese Albums (AFP)	24
Portuguese Albums (AFP) Gllit version	114
South Korean Albums (Circle)	2
Swiss Albums (Schweizer Hitparade)	28
US Billboard 200	6
US World Albums (Billboard)	1

=== Monthly charts ===
Monthly chart performance for Break Even
Chart (2026)	Peak Position
Japanese Albums (Oricon)	13
South Korean Albums (Circle)	5

== Release history ==
Release history for Break Even
Region	Date	Format	Label
South Korea	October 26, 2026	CD	Belift Lab
Various	October 26, 2026	Digital download; streaming	Belift Lab
