= Magnetic (Illit song) =

- Remixes cover

Single by Illit

from the EP Super Real Me
- Language: Korean
- Released: March 25, 2024
- Genre: Dance; pluggnB; house
- Length: 2:40
- Label: Belift
- Songwriters: Slow Rabbit; Bang Si-hyuk; Martin; Salem Ilese; Danke; Vincenzo; Lee Yi-jin; Sophie Leigh McBurnie; Lauren Amber Aquilina; Marcus Andersson; Kim Kiwi; Oh Hyun-seon (Lalala Studio); James
- Producers: Slow Rabbit; Bang Si-hyuk; Martin

Illit singles chronology
"Magnetic" (2024)	"Cherish (My Love)" (2024)

Music video
- "Magnetic" on YouTube

"Magnetic" is a song recorded by South Korean girl group Illit for their debut extended play, Super Real Me. Written by its producers Slow Rabbit, Bang Si-hyuk, and Martin, it was released as the EP's lead single by Belift Lab on March 25, 2024.

== Background and release ==
On February 13, 2024, Belift Lab announced that Illit would be debuting in March 2024. On February 21, it was announced that Illit would be releasing their debut extended play on March 25. Five days later, it was announced that the extended play would be titled Super Real Me. On March 9, the track listing was released with "Magnetic" announced as the lead single. On March 16, the highlight medley teaser video was released. The music video teasers were released on March 18, March 22, and March 24. The song was released alongside its music video and the extended play on March 25.

== Composition ==
"Magnetic" was primarily written and produced by Slow Rabbit, Bang Si-hyuk, and Martin, with Salem Ilese, Danke, Vincenzo, Lee Yi-jin, Sophie Leigh McBurnie, Lauren Amber Aquilina, Marcus Andersson, Kim Kiwi, Oh Hyun-seon (Lalala Studio), and James participating in the writing. Described as a dance song with elements of pluggnb and house genre, it is characterized by "arpeggio synths and dynamic bass", with lyrics about "comparing the heart that runs at full speed towards the person [you] like to a magnet". "Magnetic" was composed in the key of D-flat major, with a tempo of 131 beats per minute.

== Commercial performance ==
"Magnetic" debuted at number 20 on New Zealand's RMNZ Hot Singles on the chart dated April 1, 2024. It became the first K-pop debut song to appear on the UK Official Singles Chart, opening at number 80, and the US Billboard Hot 100 at number 91.

"Magnetic" was Illit's first song to surpass 100 million plays on Oricon's Streaming Chart, doing so during the week of June 3–9, 2024. The song reached the milestone in its 11th week after release, making it the fastest song to reach 100 million plays by a female group in Oricon's rankings, beating NiziU's previous record of 19 weeks for "Make You Happy" (2020).

According to the agency Belift Lab on the June 20, 2024, the number of YouTube views of the music video for "Magnetic" exceeded 100 million views, achieved in 85 days of debut.

== Promotion ==
Prior to the release of Super Real Me, on March 25, 2024, Illit held a live showcase aimed at introducing the extended play and its songs, including "Magnetic". They subsequently performed on three music programs: Mnet's M Countdown on March 28, KBS's Music Bank on March 29, and SBS M's The Show on April 2.

== Accolades ==
On South Korean music programs, "Magnetic" received 12 first place awards and a triple crown on Inkigayo and Show! Music Core.

Awards and nominations for "Magnetic"
Ceremony	Year	Award	Result	Ref.
Asian Pop Music Awards	2024	Top 20 Songs of the Year (Overseas)	Won	
Asian Pop Music Awards	2024	Best Dance Performance (Overseas)	Nominated	
Billboard Music Awards	2024	Top Global K-Pop Song	Nominated	
Golden Disc Awards	2024	Best Digital Song (Bonsang)	Won	
Golden Disc Awards	2024	Song of the Year (Daesang)	Nominated	
iHeartRadio Music Awards	2025	K-pop Song of the Year	Nominated	
iHeartRadio Music Awards	2025	Favorite K-pop Dance Challenge	Nominated	
Japan Gold Disc Award	2025	Song of the Year by Download (Asia)	Won	
Japan Gold Disc Award	2025	Song of the Year by Streaming (Asia)	Won	
Japan Gold Disc Award	2025	Best 5 Songs by Streaming	Won	
Music Awards Japan	2025	Best K-pop Song in Japan	Nominated	
Music Awards Japan	2025	Best of Listeners' Choice: International Song	Nominated	
Korea Grand Music Awards	2024	Best 10 Songs	Nominated	
Korea Grand Music Awards	2024	Best Rookie – Song	Nominated	
Korean Music Awards	2025	Best K-pop Song	Nominated	
MAMA Awards	2024	Best Choreography	Nominated	
MAMA Awards	2024	Best Dance Performance – Female	Nominated	
MAMA Awards	2024	Song of the Year	Nominated	
Melon Music Awards	2024	Song of the Year	Nominated	
TikTok Awards Korea	2024	Best Viral Song	Won	
TMElive International Music Awards	2025	Annual Overseas Popular Song	Won	

Music program awards for "Magnetic"
Program	Date	Ref.
Inkigayo	April 21, 2024	
Inkigayo	April 28, 2024	
Inkigayo	May 5, 2024	
M Countdown	April 18, 2024	
M Countdown	April 25, 2024	
Music Bank	April 19, 2024	
The Show	April 2, 2024	
The Show	April 9, 2024	
Show Champion	April 17, 2024	
Show! Music Core	April 13, 2024	
Show! Music Core	April 20, 2024	
Show! Music Core	April 27, 2024	

=== Listicles ===
Name of publisher, year listed, name of listicle, and placement
Publisher	Year	Listicle	Placement	Ref.
Billboard	2024	The 20 Best K-Pop Songs of 2024 (So Far): Critic's Picks	8th	
Idology	2024	16 Best Songs of 2024	—N/a	
NME	2024	NME's 50 Best Songs of 2024	27th	
NPR	2024	124 Best Songs of 2024	—N/a	

== Track listing ==
- Digital download/streaming – remixes
1. "Magnetic" (R&B remix) – 2:51
2. "Magnetic" (starlight remix) – 2:48
3. "Magnetic" (city night remix) – 2:54

== Charts ==
=== Weekly charts ===
Weekly chart performance
Chart (2024)	Peak position
Australia (ARIA)	29
Belarus Airplay (TopHit)	15
Canada (Canadian Hot 100)	37
CIS Airplay (TopHit)	25
Egypt (IFPI)	14
Global 200 (Billboard)	6
Hong Kong (Billboard)	1
Indonesia (Billboard)	5
Japan (Japan Hot 100)	3
Japan Combined Singles (Oricon)	4
Kazakhstan Airplay (TopHit)	24
Malaysia (Billboard)	1
Malaysia International (RIM)	1
Netherlands (Global Top 40)	6
New Zealand (Recorded Music NZ)	30
Philippines (Billboard)	8
Philippines (Philippines Hot 100)	46
Russia Airplay (TopHit)	14
Singapore (RIAS)	1
South Korea (Circle)	1
Taiwan (Billboard)	1
UK Singles (Official Charts)	80
UK Indie (Official Charts)	24
US Billboard Hot 100	91
US World Digital Song Sales (Billboard)	6

=== Monthly charts ===
Monthly chart performance for "Magnetic"
Chart (2024)	Position
Belarus Airplay (TopHit)	17
CIS Airplay (TopHit)	34
Kazakhstan Airplay (TopHit)	29
Russia Airplay (TopHit)	20
South Korea (Circle)	1

=== Year-end charts ===
2024 year-end chart performance
Chart (2024)	Position
Belarus Airplay (TopHit)	98
CIS Airplay (TopHit)	199
Global 200 (Billboard)	61
Japan (Japan Hot 100)	15
Philippines (Philippines Hot 100)	76

2025 year-end chart performance
Chart (2025)	Position
Japan (Japan Hot 100)	91
South Korea (Circle)	32

== Certifications ==
Certifications
Region	Certification	Certified units/sales
New Zealand (RMNZ)	Platinum	30,000^{‡}
United Kingdom (BPI)	Silver	200,000^{‡}
Streaming
Japan (RIAJ)	3× Platinum	300,000,000^{†}
South Korea (KMCA)	Platinum	100,000,000^{†}
^{‡} Sales+streaming figures based on certification alone.^{†} Streaming-only figures based on certification alone.

== Release history ==
Release history
Region	Date	Format	Version	Label
Various	March 25, 2024	Digital download; streaming	Original	Belift Lab
Various	April 19, 2024	Digital download; streaming	Remixes	Belift Lab
