= Bomb (EP) =

- Digital cover

EP by Illit
- Released: June 16, 2025
- Length: 13:20
- Languages: Korean; English
- Label: Belift Lab
- Producers: Jesse Shatkin; "Hitman" Bang; Frants; Fig Tape; Shinkung; Dyvahh; Dwilly; Christian Medice; Vincenzo; Askjell Solstrand

Illit chronology
I'll Like You (2024)	Bomb (2025)	Not Cute Anymore (2025)

Singles from Bomb
- 1. "Billyeoon Goyangi (Do the Dance)" Released: June 16, 2025; 2. "Jellyous" Released: August 1, 2025

Professional ratings
Review scores
Source	Rating
AllMusic	4/5 stars
IZM	2.5/5 stars
NME	4/5 stars

Bomb is the third extended play by South Korean girl group Illit. It was released by Belift Lab on June 16, 2025, and contains five tracks including the lead single "Do the Dance". The EP contains elements of synth-pop, Eurodance, chiptune, and lo-fi.

== Background and release ==
On May 19, 2025, Belift Lab announced that Illit's third extended play Bomb would be released on June 16. The promotional schedule was released the following day. On May 22, the tracklist was revealed, with "Do the Dance" announced as the lead single, and the highlight medley video was released later the same day. A snippet video for "Do the Dance" was released on May 24. On June 5, the music video for the first track "Little Monster" was released as the brand film of the extended play. Concept photos and films of different versions, namely "Gllit", "Pink Bomb", "Star Bomb", and "Magic Bomb", were released from June 8 to 12. Music video teasers for "Do the Dance" were released on June 13 and 15. The extended play was released alongside the music video for "Do the Dance" on June 16. On July 6, a music video teaser for the track "Jellyous" was released, before the release of the music video on July 7.

== Composition ==
The opening track "Little Monster" is a synth-pop on which the members discuss things in life that stress them out, describing them as monsters that they will eat to stop being tormented. The second track "Do the Dance", co-written by Illit member Yunah and Huh Yunjin of Le Sserafim, is a Eurodance song that samples "Yuga Naru Dasso", an instrumental piece from the 1989 anime film The Five Star Stories. The tracks sees the members describing how it feels to go on a first date, with the post-chorus mimicking "the nervous stuttering of young lovers speaking to one another". The third track "Jellyous" is a chiptune-inspired song with a fast beat and child-like envious delivery. The fourth track "Oops!" contains a funky bassline and whistled post-chorus with a wordless breakdown on the bridge, and the closing track "Bamsopoong" is a lo-fi song about the quiet moments in life.

== Track listing ==
Bomb track listing
No.	Title	Writer(s)	Producer(s)	Length
1.	"Little Monster"	Caroline Ailin; Jesse Shatkin; Dyvahh; "Hitman" Bang; Vincenzo; January 8th; 3! (Lalala Studio); Maryjane (Lalala Studio); Dana; Kim Bo-eun (Jamfactory); Leekyung (Wavecloud); So Do-yeon (Wavecloud); Vendors (Chiller and Owl); Jo Yoon-kyung; Bay (153/Joombas); Miah (153/Joombas); Lee Yi-jin; Ellie Suh (153/Joombas); Yoonchae (MUMW)	Shatkin	2:29
2.	"Do the Dance" (빌려온 고양이; Billyeoon goyangi; 'Borrowed cat')	"Hitman" Bang; Moa "Cazzi Opeia" Carlebecker (Sunshine); Ellen Berg (Sunshine); Fig Tape; Dyvahh; Frants; Shinkung; Tomoyuki Asakawa; Jang Jeong-won (Jamfactory); Miah (153/Joombas); Bay (153/Joombas); Kim Kiwi; Yunah; Maryjane (Lalala Studio); 4 Seasons (Lee Aeng-du, Kim Chae-ah, and Lee Eun-hwa) (153/Joombas); Huh Yunjin	"Hitman" Bang; Frants; Fig Tape; Shinkung; Dyvahh	3:08
3.	"Jellyous"	David Wilson; Colin Magalong; Sorana Pacurar; Dyvahh; "Hitman" Bang; Kim Soo-ji (Lalala Studio); Belift Lab Inc.; Kim Kiwi; Jeon Ji-eun; Moon Yeo-reum (Jamfactory); Lee Seu-ran; Danke	Dwilly	2:43
4.	"Oops!"	Teddi Gold; Kara Connolly; Christian Medice; Simba; Dyvahh; Kim Soo-ji (Lalala Studio); Lee Hye-yoom (Jamfactory); Jang Jeong-won (Jamfactory); Kim Ji-yeong (MUMW); Ssac (MUMW); Ellie Suh (153/Joombas)	Medice	2:41
5.	"밤소풍; Bamsopung; 'Night picnic'"	Vincenzo; Askjell Solstrand; Lauren Aquilina; Iselin Solheim; Dyvahh; Kim Soo-ji (Lalala Studio); Moon Ji-yeong (Lalala Studio); Jo Yoon-kyung; January 8th; Lee Seu-ran	Vincenzo; Solstrand	2:19
Total length:				13:20

=== Notes ===
- "Do the Dance" contains a sample of "Yuga Naru Dasso", written by Tomoyuki Asakawa.

== Personnel ==
Credits adapted from Tidal.

=== Illit ===
- Minju – vocals (all tracks), background vocals (track 3)
- Moka – vocals
- Iroha – vocals
- Wonhee – vocals
- Yunah – vocals

=== Additional contributors ===
- Josh Gudwin – mixing (1)
- Geoff Swan – mixing (2)
- Kevin Grainger – mixing (3)
- Jeong Woo Yeong – mixing (4)
- Jeon Bu Yeon – mixing (5)
- Felix Byrne – mixing assistance (1)
- Matt Cahill – mixing assistance (2)
- Chris Gehringer – mastering
- Sophia Pae – background vocals (1)
- Kyeongseon – background vocals (2)
- Lara Andersson – background vocals (2)
- Cazzi Opeia – background vocals (2)
- Perrie – background vocals (3–5)
- Teddi Gold – background vocals (4)
- Lauren Aquilina – background vocals (5)

== Charts ==
=== Weekly charts ===
Weekly chart performance for Bomb
Chart (2025–2026)	Peak position
Belgian Albums (Ultratop Flanders)	75
Croatian International Albums (HDU)	13
French Albums (SNEP)	96
Greek Albums (IFPI)	26
Hungarian Physical Albums (MAHASZ)	13
Japanese Albums (Oricon)	2
Japanese Combined Albums (Oricon)	2
Japanese Hot Albums (Billboard Japan)	3
Portuguese Albums (AFP)	92
Scottish Albums (Official Charts)	67
South Korean Albums (Circle)	1
Swedish Physical Albums (Sverigetopplistan)	13
UK Physical Albums (OCC)	92
US Billboard 200	171
US World Albums (Billboard)	2

=== Monthly charts ===
Monthly chart performance for Bomb
Chart (2025)	Position
Japanese Albums (Oricon)	6
South Korean Albums (Circle)	5

=== Year-end charts ===
Year-end chart performance for Bomb
Chart (2025)	Position
South Korean Albums (Circle)	49

== Certifications ==
Certifications for Bomb
Region	Certification	Certified units/sales
South Korea (KMCA)	2× Platinum	500,000^{^}
^{^} Shipments figures based on certification alone.

== Release history ==
Release history for Bomb
Region	Date	Format	Label
Various	June 16, 2025	Digital download; streaming	Belift Lab
South Korea	June 16, 2025	CD	Belift Lab
