= Bang Si-hyuk =

South Korean music executive (born 1972)

- Bang in 2025
- Born: August 9, 1972 (age 54); Seoul, South Korea
- Other names: "Hitman" Bang, Bang PD
- Education: Seoul National University (BA)
- Occupations: Music executive; record producer; songwriter
- Years active: 1994–present
- Title: Founder and Chairman of Hybe Corporation; Founder of Big Hit Music; Co-founder of JYP Entertainment
- Father: Bang Keuk-yoon
- Relatives: Choi Kyu-sik (maternal uncle)

Korean name
- Hangul: 방시혁
- RR: Bang Sihyeok
- MR: Pang Sihyŏk
- Website: hybecorp.com

Bang Si-hyuk (Korean: 방시혁; born August 9, 1972), also known as "Hitman" Bang, is a South Korean music executive, record producer and songwriter who is the co-founder of JYP Entertainment, founder of record label Big Hit Music, and chairman of Hybe Corporation.

One of the 50 wealthiest people in South Korea according to Forbes Asia, Bang is the only billionaire in the South Korean entertainment industry. As of April 2026, his reported net worth is an estimated $1.25 billion, according to Forbes 2026 Korea's 50 Richest List.

== Early life and education ==
Bang was born on August 9, 1972 to Bang Geuk-yoon, former president of the Korea Workers' Compensation and Welfare Corporation at the Korea Social Insurance Research Institute, and his wife, Choi Myung-ja. Bang has a younger sister.

Bang developed a passion for music from an early age, having grown up in a musical home, but was discouraged from pursuing a career in the industry by his parents. Bang formed a band with his friends while in middle school and wrote and performed songs he composed. He attended Kyunggi High School before graduating from Seoul National University with a degree in aesthetics.

== Career ==
Bang debuted as a composer while in college. In 1994, he won the Yoo Jae-ha Music Contest and began his career in earnest writing and producing songs. He met Park Jin-young in 1997, and the pair often partnered together as a songwriting duo. Bang co-founded JYP Entertainment, becoming a composer, arranger and producer at the company. One of their early successes was the first-generation group g.o.d. Some of g.o.d's most famous songs arranged by Bang include "One Candle" and "Road". Bang's stage name "Hitman" originated from this period, when g.o.d enjoyed success as one of the country's best-selling and most popular boy bands of the early 2000s, earning himself and Park a reputation as "hit makers". Besides g.o.d, Bang has produced or composed for many other artists, including veterans Im Chang-jung and Park Ji-yoon, singer-actor Rain, groups Wonder Girls, 2AM, and Teen Top, and R&B singer Baek Ji-young.

Nearly four years after joining JYP Entertainment, Bang left JYP and founded his own company, Big Hit Entertainment, where he continued to write, compose and produce for its artists. Under the Big Hit label, he signed up RM, at age 15, who would go on to lead the boy band BTS. He co-wrote six songs for BTS in their 2016 album Wings. Its success garnered Bang the Best Producer Award at the Mnet Asian Music Awards and the Songwriter Award at the Melon Music Awards that year. In June 2018, he was named one of Variety's International Music Leaders due to BTS' achievements.

In April 2019, Bloomberg estimated Bang's worth to be about $770 million. The BigHit initial public offering (IPO) filed in October 2020 was the largest seen in South Korea in three years and skyrocketed Bang's net worth to $2.8 billion, making him the only billionaire in South Korea's entertainment industry and the sixth-richest person in the country. The success of the IPO, together with the commercial success of BTS that year, Bang's steps into diversification with apps like Weverse, and acquisitions of companies like Source Music and Pledis Entertainment among others, landed him on the 2020 edition of Variety's Variety500, an annual index of the 500 most influential business leaders in the global media industry.

In June 2021, Forbes Asia published its annual list of Korea's 50 Richest People. One of only two newcomers to the ranking, Bang was listed as the 16th richest person in South Korea. On July 1, following an organizational restructuring, Hybe announced Bang's resignation as CEO of the company to return his focus to music production. He was replaced by Park Ji-won, but retained his position as Chairman of the Board of Directors. According to the Bloomberg Billionaires Index, Bang is worth an estimated $3.2 billion as of July 2021.

Bang was featured on the cover of the April 2022 issue of Time magazine, together with BTS, following the release of the outlet's annual list of the 100 Most Influential Companies in March. Later that month, he received an honorary doctorate in Business from Seoul National University—he is the first figure in the entertainment industry to be awarded such—in recognition of his "contribution to the development and innovation of the nation's cultural and entertainment industry" and for his "role in turning K-pop into a global pop music culture".

== Legal matters ==
=== Loan towards Min Hee-jin's share in ADOR ===
In November 2024, TenAsia reported that Bang Si-hyuk had personally lent Min Hee-jin approximately ₩3.7 billion (US$2.76 million) in March 2023 to finance her purchase of 573,160 shares in ADOR, equivalent to an 18% stake in the company. The loan was separate from the shareholder agreement between Min and Hybe. Including interest at the statutory rate of 4.6%, the outstanding amount was estimated to have reached approximately ₩3.94 billion (US$2.94 million) by the end of November 2024. Bang was reportedly considering legal action to recover the debt following Min's resignation as an ADOR inside director on November 20, 2024.

In October 2026, media outlets reported that Bang had filed a civil lawsuit against Min seeking repayment of approximately ₩4.21 billion (US$3.14 million), including interest. The dispute concerned the 2023 loan of approximately ₩3.74 billion (US$2.79 million), which Min used to purchase the 573,160 ADOR shares, representing approximately 17.8% of the company.

Bang had reportedly applied for a payment order in April 2026. In May, the Seoul Western District Court ordered Min to repay the amount with interest. Min contested the order in July, causing the proceedings to continue as a civil lawsuit. The claim included approximately ₩500 million (US$373,057.49) in interest. The specific terms of the loan agreement have not been publicly disclosed.

Min's representatives argued that the loan was connected to the shareholder agreement and should be offset against amounts owed to her in a separate put-option dispute. They pointed to a first-instance ruling ordering Hybe to pay Min approximately ₩25.5 billion (US$19.03 million) in connection with the put option. Hybe appealed the ruling, and the payment dispute remained unresolved when the repayment lawsuit was reported in October 2026. Min's representatives also criticized Hybe's pursuit of repayment while the put-option payment remained outstanding, describing the company's position as contradictory. They stated that Min intended to settle the parties' financial claims through the ongoing legal proceedings.

=== Fraud investigation ===
In December 2024, South Korea's Financial Supervisory Service (FSS) began investigating allegations that Bang had entered into undisclosed profit-sharing agreements with private equity funds ahead of Hybe's 2020 IPO. The funds, which were allegedly linked to Bang, purchased shares in BigHit Entertainment after persuading early investors to sell without disclosing the company's impending IPO. They later sold the shares at a profit, bypassing the IPO lock-up period. Hybe denied wrongdoing, stating that the shareholder agreement had been reviewed by IPO underwriters during the listing process, who determined that it did not require public disclosure.

On July 16, 2025, the Financial Services Commission (FSC) referred Bang and three other executives to prosecutors over suspected unfair trading related to the IPO. On July 24, police raided Hybe's headquarters in Seoul as part of the investigation. The company said it was cooperating with the authorities and would seek to demonstrate its compliance with the law.

On August 6, Bang sent a message to Hybe employees apologizing for the concern caused by the investigation. He said he had provided the FSS with a comprehensive explanation and would set aside business commitments to cooperate with the authorities. He returned to South Korea on August 12 to cooperate with the investigation. Police questioned him on September 15 and September 22, and again on November 5, when he underwent 13 hours of questioning.

In December, the Seoul Southern District Court approved a police request to provisionally seize Bang's Hybe shares, valued at approximately ₩156.8 billion (US$116.99 million). The request had been filed by the Seoul Metropolitan Police Agency in November while the investigation was ongoing. On December 18, the FSS's special judicial police searched Bang's home and offices as part of their investigation into the alleged unfair trading.

In April 2026, police sought an arrest warrant for Bang in connection with the investigation. In September, police referred the case to prosecutors at the Seoul Southern District Prosecutors' Office without detention. The referral followed a court order freezing assets worth ₩263 billion (US$196.23 million), representing the alleged proceeds of the scheme.

== Philanthropy ==
In October 2022, Bang donated ₩5 billion (US$3.73 million) to the Community Chest of Korea. On February 17, 2023, Bang donated 200 million won through Save the Children to help in the 2023 Turkey–Syria earthquakes. In March 2025, Bang donated ₩5 billion (US$3.73 million) to Seoul National University for the construction of a new Cultural Center.

== Production discography ==
Year	Artist	Album	Notes
2007	Wonder Girls	The Wonder Years	
2009	Taegoon	1st Mini Album	
2009	T-ara	Absolute First Album	Production and writing credits on "Like the First Time"
2010	2AM	Saint o'Clock	
2011	Lee Hyun	You Are the Best of My Life	
2011	Homme	Homme by Hitman Bang	
2011	Lee Seung-gi	Tonight	
2011	Teen Top	Roman	With composer Park Chang-hyeon
2012	Lee Hyun	The Healing Echo	
2013	BTS	2 Cool 4 Skool	Co-produced with Pdogg
2013	BTS	O!RUL8,2?	Co-produced with Pdogg
2014	BTS	Skool Luv Affair	
2014	BTS	Skool Luv Affair Special Addition	
2014	BTS	1st Japan Single Album: No More Dream	
2014	BTS	2nd Japan Single Album: Boy In Luv	
2014	BTS	Dark & Wild	
2014	BTS	3rd Japan Single Album: Danger	
2014	BTS	Wake Up	
2015	BTS	The Most Beautiful Moment in Life, Part 1	
2015	BTS	4th Japan Single Album: For You	
2015	BTS	The Most Beautiful Moment in Life, Part 2	
2015	BTS	5th Japan Single Album: I Need U	
2015	BTS	6th Japan Single Album: Run	
2016	BTS	The Most Beautiful Moment in Life: Young Forever	
2016	BTS	Youth	
2016	BTS	Wings	
2017	BTS	You Never Walk Alone	
2017	BTS	Love Yourself 承 Her	
2018	BTS	Love Yourself 轉 Tear	
2018	BTS	Love Yourself 結 Answer	
2018	IZ	Angel	"Angel" with Supreme Boi, co-composed "Granulate" with Kim Do-hoon
2019	TXT	The Dream Chapter: Star	
2019	BTS	Map of the Soul: Persona	
2019	BTS	BTS World: Original Soundtrack	
2019	TXT	The Dream Chapter: Magic	
2020	GFriend	回:Labyrinth	
2020	BTS	Map of the Soul: 7	
2020	TXT	The Dream Chapter: Eternity	
2020	GFriend	回:Song of the Sirens	
2020	BTS	Map of the Soul: 7 ~The Journey~	
2020	TXT	Minisode1: Blue Hour	
2020	GFriend	回:Walpurgis Night	Co-wrote "Mago", production and writing credits in "Apple" and "Labyrinth"
2020	Enhypen	Border: Day One	Production credits on "Given-Taken" and "Let Me In (20 CUBE)"
2021	Enhypen	Border: Carnival	Production credits on "Drunk-Dazed"
2021	TXT	The Chaos Chapter: Freeze	
2021	Seventeen	Your Choice	
2021	TXT	The Chaos Chapter: Fight or Escape	
2021	Enhypen	Dimension: Dilemma	Production credits on "Tamed-Dashed", "Upper Side Dreamin'" and "Just a Little Bit"
2022	Enhypen	Dimension: Answer	
2022	Le Sserafim	Fearless	Executive Producer
2022	TXT	minisode 2: Thursday's Child	
2022	Enhypen	Manifesto: Day 1	Production credits on "Future Perfect (Pass the Mic)"
2022	Le Sserafim	Antifragile	Executive producer
2023	TXT	The Name Chapter: Temptation	
2023	Le Sserafim	Unforgiven	Executive producer
2023	Fromis 9	Unlock My World	Production credits on "Bring It On"
2023	&Team	First Howling: WE	Production credits in "Firework"
2024	Illit	Super Real Me	Production credits on "Magnetic"
2024	TXT	Minisode 3: Tomorrow	Production credits on "- --- -- --- .-. .-. --- .--", "Deja Vu" and "Miracle"
2024	&Team	Samidare	Production, composed and writing credits on "Samidare"
2024	Enhypen	Romance: Untold	Production credits on "Paranormal"
2024	&Team	Aoarashi	Production, composed and writing credits on "Aoarashi"
2024	Katseye	SIS (Soft Is Strong)	Production credits on "My Way"
2024	Le Sserafim	Crazy	Production credits on "Crazy" and "Pierrot"
2024	Illit	I'll Like You	Production credits on "Tick Tack"
2024	TXT	The Star Chapter: Sanctuary	Production credits on "Over the Moon" and "Resist (Not Gonna Run Away)"
2025	Katseye	Beautiful Chaos	Production credits on "Gnarly"
2025	Enhypen	Desire: Unleash	Production credits on "Bad Desire (With or Without You)" and "Bad Desire (With or Without You)" (English version)
2025	Illit	Bomb	Production credits on "Do the Dance"
2025	Cortis	Color Outside the Lines	Production credits on "What You Want"
2025	Le Sserafim	Spaghetti	Production credits on "Spaghetti"
2026	Katseye	Wild	Production credits on "Pinky Up"
2026	Le Sserafim	Pureflow Pt. 1	Production credits on "Boompala", "Celebration", "Creatures" and "Irony"
2026	Cortis	GreenGreen	Production credits on "RedRed", "Acai" and "Wassup"
2026	TXT	7th Year: A Moment of Stillness in the Thorns	Production credits on "Bed of Thorns"
2026	Illit	Break Even	Production credits on "Super in Love", "More", "You're Under Arrest" and "Pop"
2026	TXT	Perfect storm	Production credits on "Storm Is...", "Angel Bite" and "Higher Love"
2026	Enhypen	The Sin: Parallel World	Production credits on "I Want You"

== Recognition ==
=== Awards ===
Name of the award ceremony, year presented, category, nominee(s) of the award, and the result of the nomination
Award ceremony	Year	Category	Work(s)	Result	Ref.
Melon Music Awards	2009	Songwriter Award	—N/a	Won	
Mnet 20's Choice Awards	2010	20's Most Influential Star Award	—N/a	Won	
Korea Music Copyright Awards	2011	Best Lyricist (Ballad)	—N/a	Won	
Korea Music Copyright Awards	2011	Best Songwriter (Ballad)	—N/a	Won	
Korea Music Copyright Awards	2011	Masterpiece Award	—N/a	Won	
Asia Artist Awards	2016	Best Producer Award	—N/a	Won	
Melon Music Awards	2016	Songwriter Award	—N/a	Won	
Mnet Asian Music Awards	2016	Special Awards – Best Executive Producer	—N/a	Won	
Golden Disc Awards	2017	Best Producer	—N/a	Won	
Gaon Chart Music Awards	2017	Producer of the Year	—N/a	Won	
Korea Content Awards	2017	Presidential Commendation	—N/a	Won	
Seoul Music Awards	2018	Producer Award	—N/a	Won	
Genie Music Awards	2018	Producer Award	—N/a	Won	
Mnet Asian Music Awards	2018	Producer of the Year	—N/a	Won	
Edaily Culture Awards	2018	Frontier Award	—N/a	Won	
Pony Chung Innovation Awards	2020	Innovation Award	—N/a	Won	
Mnet Asian Music Awards	2020	Best Executive Producer of the Year	—N/a	Won	

=== Listicles ===
Name of publisher, year listed, name of listicle, and placement
Publisher	Year	Listicle	Placement	Ref.
Billboard	2018	International Power Players – Recording	Placed	
Billboard	2019	New Power Generation: 25 Top Innovators	Placed	
Billboard	2019	International Power Players – Recording	Placed	
Golden Disc Awards	2025	Golden Disc Powerhouse 40	Placed	

=== Additional awards ===
In 2022, he was conferred an honorary doctorate in business administration by Seoul National University. In 2024, he received the Asia Society's Asia Game Changer Award in New York for his role in globalizing Korean music.
