= Belift Lab =

South Korean entertainment company

Belift Lab, Inc.
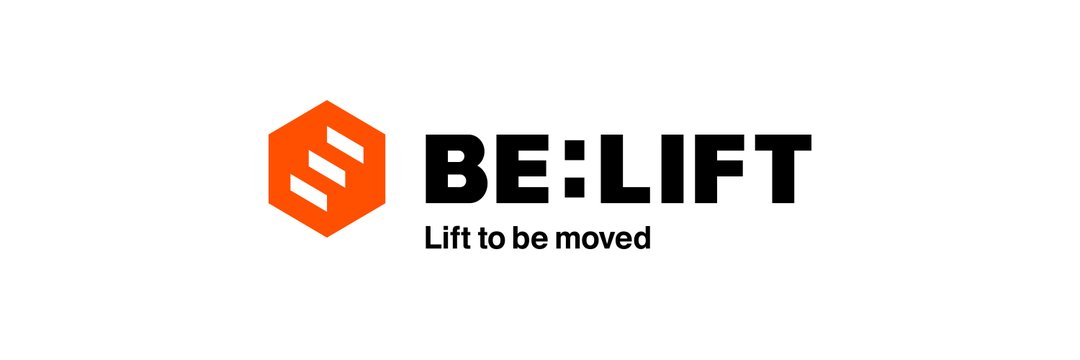
- Native name: 주식회사 빌리프랩
- Type: Subsidiary
- Industry: Entertainment
- Founded: September 17, 2018
- Founder: Bang Si-hyuk
- Headquarters: 14F 42 Hangang-daero, Yongsan-gu, Seoul (Hangangno 3-ga, Yongsan Trade Center), South Korea, South Korea
- Area served: Worldwide
- Key people: Kim Tae-ho (CEO and president)
- Services: Music production; Artists management
- Revenue: ▲ ₩154.71 billion (US$115.43 million) (2025)
- Net income: ▲ ₩38.31 billion (US$28.58 million) (2025)
- Total assets: ▲ ₩153.15 billion (US$114.27 million) (2025)
- Total equity: ▲ ₩59.78 billion (US$44.6 million) (2025)
- Number of employees: 88 (2025)
- Parent: Hybe Corporation (Note: since 2023)
- Website: beliftlab.com

Belift Lab, Inc. (Korean: 주식회사 빌리프랩) is a South Korean record label, founded as a joint venture between Hybe and CJ ENM on September 17, 2018.

In 2023, Hybe acquired full ownership, making Belift Lab a subsidiary while allowing it to operate independently within Hybe's multi-label system.

The label currently manages boy group Enhypen, girl group Illit, and soloist Evan.

== History ==
=== 2018–2020: Founding and early years ===
Belift Lab was established on September 17, 2018, as a collaboration by then Big Hit Entertainment and CJ ENM to develop K-pop artists for a global audience. In March 2019, the company launched international auditions for male trainees aimed at debuting a new idol group in 2020. Auditions were held in South Korea, the United States, Japan, and other regions.

In 2020, Belift Lab co-produced the survival reality show I-Land with Mnet and CJ ENM. Trainees competed for a place in the final lineup through missions and evaluations, with fan voting incorporated globally.

Seven trainees, Jungwon, Heeseung, Jay, Jake, Sunghoon, Sunoo, and Ni-Ki were selected to form Enhypen in September 2020 and debuted in November.

=== 2021–present: Hybe acquisition and new projects ===
In August 2023, Hybe purchased CJ ENM's 51.5% stake in Belift Lab for 150 billion won (~$113.8 million), finalizing the acquisition on September 1, 2023, making Belift Lab a wholly owned Hybe subsidiary.

That year, Belift Lab partnered with JTBC to produce the survival audition program R U Next? to select members for its first girl group, Illit. Initially six members were chosen; one, Youngseo, later departed before the group's March 2024 debut.

On March 10, 2026 Belift Lab announced that Heeseung would be leaving Enhypen to pursue a solo career while remaining with the label. On April 8, Belift announced that Heeseung would change his stage name from his birth name "Heeseung" to "Evan", a name he has used since childhood.

== Philanthropy ==
On November 20, 2025, Belift Lab and Enhypen donated ₩100 million to support flood relief efforts in the Philippines following back-to-back typhoons.

== Artists ==
=== Current artists ===
- Enhypen
- Illit
- Evan

== Legal matters ==
=== Lawsuit against Min Hee-jin ===
==== Civil case ====
On May 22, 2024, Belift Lab, the Hybe-affiliated agency representing Illit, filed a ₩2 billion (US$1.49 million) damages lawsuit against Min Hee-jin. The company alleged that Min's public accusations that Illit had copied NewJeans were false and had damaged its reputation and business interests, as well as those of its artists.

At the final hearing before the Seoul Western District Court on September 11, 2026, Belift Lab argued that Min had presented her accusations as facts rather than opinions, emphasizing that her position in the music industry had amplified their impact. It disputed her characterization of the remarks as questions or expressions of opinion. Min's representatives countered that her comments reflected concerns about similarities between the two groups and were made in response to Hybe's actions. The court closed arguments and scheduled its ruling for November 13, 2026.

On October 12, Belift Lab applied to reopen the proceedings. Min's representatives argued that doing so could delay the judgment. The court had not announced a decision on the application as of October 14.

Min separately filed a countersuit seeking ₩5 billion (US$3.73 million) in damages from Belift Lab, alleging that similarities between Illit and NewJeans had caused financial and emotional harm to her and NewJeans. The court also closed proceedings in this case on September 11, 2026, scheduling its first-instance ruling for November 13.

On November 13, the court dismissed both Belift Lab's lawsuit against Min and her countersuit against the company. Belift Lab expressed disappointment with the ruling, arguing that the court had effectively acknowledged the existence of victims without establishing who was responsible. It also criticized the court's treatment of Min's remarks as expressions of opinion and said it had not been given an opportunity to have newly submitted evidence examined. The company announced that it would appeal immediately.

==== Potential criminal case ====
On October 1, 2026, Yongsan Police Station referred former ADOR CEO Min Hee-jin and two former ADOR vice presidents to prosecutors on suspicion of business obstruction and defamation. The investigation concerned Min's April 2024 allegations that Belift Lab's girl group Illit had copied elements of NewJeans, including audition posters, hanbok photography concepts, debut strategy, and choreography. According to media reports, police found the allegations to be false and concluded that they had been made with the intention of damaging Hybe and Belift Lab.

Min's representatives disputed the police's findings, noting that a referral to prosecutors did not amount to a formal charge or a judicial ruling. They also questioned the consistency of the decision, pointing out that the same police station had previously declined to refer a separate complaint against Min. They further argued that concerns about similarities between Illit and NewJeans had been raised publicly before Min's April 2024 press conference.

=== Privacy violations and stalking incidents ===
On March 5, 2025, Belift Lab, the agency representing South Korean boy group Enhypen, issued a statement on Weverse about repeated stalking incidents and invasions of the members' privacy. The agency reported that some individuals had allegedly hired delivery workers and drivers to gain access to the group's accommodation, photograph the members, and sell the images. Other incidents involved individuals boarding the group's flights using illegally obtained travel information and filming members in private spaces.

In a later notice on Weverse, the company reported another stalking incident involving Enhypen member Jay. According to the agency, an individual had repeatedly contacted Jay's personal phone number under false pretences, recorded their conversations without his knowledge, and shared the recordings online. Belift Lab said it had filed a criminal complaint against the individual and would pursue legal action over the incident. The agency also reiterated its commitment to taking legal action against stalking and violations of its artists' privacy.

=== Lawsuit against Team Bunnies ===
On 15 December 2025, The Korea Herald reported that the company had filed a civil lawsuit seeking 100 million won in damages from the operator of NewJeans fan group, Team Bunnies, and the operator's parent. Belift Lab accused the group of repeatedly spreading false claims that Illit had plagiarised NewJeans, which it said had caused reputational and financial harm. It also alleged that the group had obtained and publicly shared a confidential internal planning document belonging to the group.

The lawsuit came amid an ongoing dispute between the parties. In November 2024, Team Bunnies had filed criminal complaints against the company's executives. The Korea Herald also reported that the group's operator had been referred to the juvenile division of the Seoul Family Court in a separate case concerning alleged breaches of South Korea's donation-collection regulations.

== Filmography ==
=== Reality shows ===
- I-Land (2020, Mnet)
- R U Next? (2023, JTBC)
