= Don't You Worry (Black Eyed Peas, Shakira and David Guetta song) =

Single by Black Eyed Peas, Shakira and David Guetta

from the album Elevation
- Released: June 17, 2022
- Length: 3:16
- Label: Epic
- Songwriters: Allan Pineda; David Guetta; Jimmy Gomez; Johnny Goldstein; Mikkel Cox; Shakira; Tobias Frederiksen; William Adams
- Producers: Guetta; Goldstein; Cox; Frederiksen; will.i.am

Black Eyed Peas singles chronology
"El Teke Teke" (2021)	"Don't You Worry" (2022)	"Simply the Best" (2022)

Shakira singles chronology
"Te Felicito" (2022)	"Don't You Worry" (2022)	"Monotonía" (2022)

David Guetta singles chronology
"Crazy What Love Can Do" (2022)	"Don't You Worry" (2022)	"The Drop" (2022)

Music video
- "Don't You Worry" on YouTube

"Don't You Worry" is a song by American group Black Eyed Peas, Colombian singer Shakira and French DJ David Guetta. It was released on June 17, 2022, through BEP Music and Epic Records and later included on the Black Eyed Peas' ninth studio album Elevation as the fourteenth track and lead single. The track was a success in mainland Europe and Asia.

== Background and release ==
"Don't You Worry" initially premiered on the music rhythm game Beatstar, before being released as the lead single of the Black Eyed Peas' ninth studio album Elevation on June 17, 2022. The song marks the second collaboration between Shakira and the Black Eyed Peas following their single "Girl Like Me" in 2020. Three remixes by Malaa, Dubdogz, DJs From Mars and Mark Ursa were released on August 19, and a remix featuring Puerto Rican singer and rapper Farruko was released on September 2.

== Reception ==
Michael Major from BroadwayWorld hailed the song as an "international banger meant to eclipse genre lines and borders", continuing how each artist on it "[blesses] the track with a signature flavor, uniting for an undeniable summer anthem that's as hot as it gets". Jack Spilsbury from We Rave You stated that the song is a "feel-good tune that is destined to take over the radio waves this summer", noting its "beautifully produced featuring nostalgia-inducing backbeats and throwback lyricism" and praising how "will.i.am and Shakira see their vocals perfectly harmonise throughout". Hannah Dailey from Yahoo! News outlined the song as "a feel good, space-themed summer anthem". El Fiesta proclaimed that the song has "quickly become a definitive anthem for 2022 and the immortal Black Eyed Peas catalog". Karina Andrade from Rádio Mix FM reflected how "the song has very positive and happy lyrics, and a more electronic and danceable feel". Mario Caridad Sánchez from SpaceFM depicted how Shakira is "once again conquering the hearts of her fans with a groovy electropop song".

FrontView Magazine described how the DJs from Mars and David Guetta remix of "Don't You Worry" is "an out-and-out club destroyer" "packed to the hilt with stuttering, shuddering basslines and arrogant synth stabs that saunter across the single’s thundering rhythm sections". They encapsulated the Mark Ursa and Dubdogz remix as "an absolute juggernaut of a remix" with "rumbling, tumbling depth drops in one direction and light, almost hopeful FX in the other".

== Music video ==
The music video for "Don't You Worry", directed by Director X, was released alongside the song on June 17, 2022. It features the three rap stars from the Black Eyed Peas, will.i.am, apl.de.ap, and Taboo, portraying aliens who visit Shakira's home planet in peace, and Shakira takes the lead in welcoming and communicating through gestures with the new extraterrestrial visitors, and eventually transforming into an alien herself. A version of the video for the Farruko remix debuted on September 2, with him being featured on it.

== Credits and personnel ==
Adapted from Tidal.

- Black Eyed Peas – lead artist
- Angelo Carretta – vocal engineer
- David Clauss – vocal engineer
- Mikkel Cox - producer
- Dylan "3D" Dresdow – engineer, mastering engineer, mixing engineer
- Tobias Frederiksen – producer
- Johnny Goldstein – producer
- David Guetta – co-lead artist, producer
- Cameron Gower Poole – vocal engineer
- Roger Rodés – vocal engineer
- Shakira – co-lead artist
- will.i.am – producer

== Charts ==
=== Weekly charts ===
Weekly chart performance for "Don't You Worry"
Chart (2022)	Peak position
Argentina Anglo (Monitor Latino)	3
Austria (Ö3 Austria Top 40)	12
Belarus Airplay (TopHit)	59
Belgium (Ultratop 50 Flanders)	37
Belgium (Ultratop 50 Wallonia)	5
Bolivia Anglo (Monitor Latino)	1
Canada Hot 100 (Billboard)	57
Canada AC (Billboard)	30
Canada CHR/Top 40 (Billboard)	26
Canada Hot AC (Billboard)	27
Central America Anglo (Monitor Latino)	1
Chile Anglo (Monitor Latino)	5
CIS Airplay (TopHit)	2
Colombia Anglo (Monitor Latino)	2
Costa Rica Anglo (Monitor Latino)	1
Croatia International Airplay (HRT)	5
Czech Republic Airplay (ČNS IFPI)	5
Dominican Republic Anglo (Monitor Latino)	2
Ecuador Anglo (Monitor Latino)	1
El Salvador (Monitor Latino)	8
Estonia Airplay (TopHit)	34
Finland Airplay (Radiosoittolista)	53
France (SNEP)	14
Germany (GfK)	43
Global 200 (Billboard)	103
Guatemala (Monitor Latino)	15
Honduras Anglo (Monitor Latino)	2
Hungary (Rádiós Top 40)	7
Hungary (Dance Top 40)	3
Hungary (Single Top 40)	10
Israel (Media Forest)	7
Italy (FIMI)	15
Japan Hot Overseas (Billboard Japan)	10
Kazakhstan Airplay (TopHit)	48
Latin America Anglo (Monitor Latino)	1
Latvia (EHR)	5
Lithuania Airplay (TopHit)	59
Luxembourg Songs (Billboard)	17
Mexico (Billboard Mexican Airplay)	2
Moldova Airplay (TopHit)	177
Netherlands (Dutch Top 40)	23
Netherlands (Single Top 100)	39
Nicaragua Anglo (Monitor Latino)	3
Panama Anglo (Monitor Latino)	1
Paraguay Anglo (Monitor Latino)	3
Peru Anglo (Monitor Latino)	1
Poland Airplay (ZPAV)	4
Puerto Rico Anglo (Monitor Latino)	1
Russia Airplay (TopHit)	1
San Marino (SMRRTV Top 50)	3
Slovakia Airplay (ČNS IFPI)	22
South Africa Radio (RISA)	50
South Korea Download (Gaon Chart)	189
Spain (PROMUSICAE)	63
Suriname (Nationale Top 40)	32
Switzerland (Schweizer Hitparade)	51
UK Singles Downloads (Official Charts)	64
UK Singles Sales (OCC)	69
Ukraine (TopHit)	188
Uruguay Anglo (Monitor Latino)	1
US Bubbling Under Hot 100 (Billboard)	22
US Adult Pop Airplay (Billboard)	27
US Hot Dance/Electronic Songs (Billboard)	7
US Pop Airplay (Billboard)	18
USA Anglo (Monitor Latino)	1
Venezuela Anglo (Monitor Latino)	1
Venezuela (Record Report)	38

=== Monthly charts ===
Monthly chart performance for "Don't You Worry"
Chart (2022)	Peak position
Russia Airplay (TopHit)	7
Paraguay (SPG)	19

=== Year-end charts ===
2022 year-end chart performance for "Don't You Worry"
Chart (2022)	Position
Belgium (Ultratop Flanders)	154
Belgium (Ultratop Wallonia)	45
France (SNEP)	87
Global Excl. US (Billboard)	195
Hungary (Dance Top 40)	63
Italy (FIMI)	79
Malaysia (KKBOX)	9
Poland (ZPAV)	56
Russia (TopHit)	64
Russia Airplay (TopHit)	56
Singapore (KKBOX)	59
Taiwan (KKBOX)	17
US Hot Dance/Electronic Songs (Billboard)	16

2023 year-end chart performance for "Don't You Worry"
Chart (2023)	Position
Hungary (Dance Top 40)	20
Kazakhstan (TopHit)	156
Kazakhstan Airplay (TopHit)	101
Panama (Monitor Latino)	81
US Hot Dance/Electronic Songs (Billboard)	100

2024 year-end chart performance for "Don't You Worry"
Chart (2024)	Position
Hungary (Dance Top 100)	59

2025 year-end chart performance for "Don't You Worry"
Chart (2025)	Position
Hungary (Dance Top 40)	88

== Certifications ==
Certifications and sales for "Don't You Worry"
Region	Certification	Certified units/sales
Austria (IFPI Austria)	Platinum	30,000^{‡}
Brazil (Pro-Música Brasil)	2× Platinum	80,000^{‡}
Canada (Music Canada)	Gold	40,000^{‡}
France (SNEP)	Diamond	333,333^{‡}
Hungary (MAHASZ)	Platinum	4,000^{‡}
Italy (FIMI)	2× Platinum	200,000^{‡}
Poland (ZPAV)	Platinum	50,000^{‡}
Spain (Promusicae)	Platinum	60,000^{‡}
Switzerland (IFPI Switzerland)	Gold	10,000^{‡}
^{‡} Sales+streaming figures based on certification alone.

== Awards and nominations ==
Awards and nominations for "Don't You Worry"
Year	Ceremony	Category	Result	Ref.
2022	NRJ Music Awards	International Song	Nominated	
2022	NRJ Music Awards	International Video	Nominated	
2022	NRJ Music Awards	International Collaboration	Nominated	
2022	LOS40 Music Awards	Mejor Canción Internacional	Nominated	
2022	LOS40 Music Awards	Mejor Colaboración Internacional	Nominated	
