= Feel the Beat (Black Eyed Peas and Maluma song) =

Single by Black Eyed Peas and Maluma

from the album Translation
- Released: June 19, 2020
- Length: 3:57
- Label: Epic
- Songwriters: William Adams; Yonatan Goldstein; Allan Pineda; Jimmy Luis Gomez; Juan Luis Londoño Arias; Hugh L Clarke; Paul Anthony Thomas; Curtis T. Bedeau; Gerard R. Charles; Brian P. George; Lucien J. George
- Producer: will.i.am

Black Eyed Peas singles chronology
"Mamacita" (2020)	"Feel the Beat" (2020)	"Vida Loca" (2020)

Maluma singles chronology
"ADMV" (2020)	"Feel the Beat" (2020)	"Hawái" (2020)

Music video
- "Feel The Beat" on YouTube

"Feel the Beat" (stylized in all caps) is a song recorded by American hip hop group Black Eyed Peas and Colombian singer Maluma for the former's eighth studio album, Translation (2020). It was written by William Adams, Yonatan Goldstein, Allan Pineda, Jimmy Luis Gomez, Maluma, Hugh L Clarke, Paul Anthony Thomas, Curtis T. Bedeau, Gerard R. Charles, Brian P. George and Lucien J. George. The song was produced by Adams under his stage name will.i.am and co-produced by Johnny Goldstein and Mucky. J. Rey Soul provides vocals in the video version of the song, she does not appear on the album version. "Feel the Beat" was released as the third single from the album on June 19, 2020, by Epic Records.

== Background ==
The Black Eyed Peas and Maluma first worked together on the former's 2019 single "Ritmo". Ultimately, Maluma's verse was removed from the song and was replaced by J Balvin. They then collaborated on a second song that "turned out to be another dead end". According to will.i.am, Maluma then became "very critical on everything that we did" and the two eventually came up with "Feel the Beat", which contains the verse that was originally written for "Ritmo".

== Music video ==
The music video for "Feel the Beat" was released on June 19, 2020.

== Charts ==
Chart (2020)	Peak position
Argentina Hot 100 (Billboard)	99
Belgium (Ultratip Wallonia Bubbling Under)	17
Mexico Airplay (Billboard)	29
San Marino (SMRRTV Top 50)	47
Spain (PROMUSICAE)	94
Switzerland (Schweizer Hitparade)	74
US Latin Airplay (Billboard)	1
US Latin Pop Airplay (Billboard)	21

== Release history ==
Release dates and formats for "Feel the Beat"
Region	Date	Format	Label	Ref.
Russia	June 18, 2020	Contemporary hit radio	Epic	
Various	June 19, 2020	Streaming	Epic	
Italy	July 17, 2020	Contemporary hit radio	Epic	

== See also ==
- List of Billboard Hot Latin Songs and Latin Airplay number ones of 2020
