= Vida Loca (song) =

Single by Black Eyed Peas, Nicky Jam and Tyga

from the album Translation
- Released: August 21, 2020
- Length: 3:54
- Label: Epic
- Songwriters: William Adams; Allan Pineda; Jimmy Luis Gomez; Micheal Ray Stevenson; Nick Rivera Caminero; James Johnson; Alonzo Miller; Kirk Burrell
- Producer: will.i.am

Black Eyed Peas singles chronology
"Feel the Beat" (2020)	"Vida Loca" (2020)	"Girl Like Me" (2020)

Nicky Jam singles chronology
"Muévelo" (2020)	"Vida Loca" (2020)	"Polvo" (2020)

Tyga singles chronology
"Money Now" (2020)	"Vida Loca" (2020)	"Sweet & Sour" (2020)

Music video
- "Vida Loca" on YouTube

"Vida Loca" (stylized in all caps) is a song recorded by American hip hop group Black Eyed Peas, American singer Nicky Jam and American rapper Tyga for the group's eighth studio album, Translation (2020). It was written by William Adams, Allan Pineda, Jimmy Luis Gomez, Tyga, Nicky Jam, James Johnson, Alonzo Miller and Kirk Burrell, and produced by Adams under his stage name will.i.am. "Vida Loca" was released as the fourth single from the album on August 21, 2020. The song contains an interpolation of "Super Freak" by Rick James.

== Music video ==
The music video for "Vida Loca" was released on August 21, 2020.

== Live performances ==
The song was performed at the 2020 MTV Video Music Awards on August 30, 2020.

== Track listing ==
- Digital download and streaming – TRIO mix
1. "Vida Loca" (TRIO mix) – 2:41

== Charts ==
Chart (2020)	Peak position
Belgium (Ultratop 50 Wallonia)	35
France (SNEP)	68
Italy (FIMI)	98

== Release history ==
Release dates and formats for "Vida Loca"
Region	Date	Format	Version	Label	Ref.
Various	September 1, 2020	Digital download; streaming	TRIO mix	Epic	
Italy	September 25, 2020	Contemporary hit radio	Album	Epic	
