= Elevation (Black Eyed Peas album) =

Studio album by Black Eyed Peas
- Released: November 11, 2022
- Length: 56:23
- Languages: English; Spanish
- Labels: will.i.am; Epic
- Producers: Ammo; Boys Noize; David Guetta; Johnny Goldstein; Mikkel Cox; Parisi; Tobías Frederiksen; will.i.am

Black Eyed Peas chronology
| Translation (2020) | Elevation (2022) |

Singles from Elevation
- 1. "Don't You Worry" Released: June 17, 2022; 2. "Simply the Best" Released: October 28, 2022; 3. "Double D'z" Released: November 14, 2022; 4. "Bailar Contigo" Released: March 10, 2023; 5. "Guarantee" Released: July 21, 2023

Professional ratings
Review scores
| Source | Rating |
|---|---|
| AllMusic | 3.5/5 stars |
| The Daily Telegraph | 2/5 stars |

Elevation is the ninth studio album by American group Black Eyed Peas. It was released on November 11, 2022, via will.i.am Music Group and Epic Records. It features guest appearances from Anitta, Anuel AA, Daddy Yankee, David Guetta, El Alfa, Marshall Jefferson, Nicky Jam, Nicole Scherzinger, Ozuna and Shakira.

It peaked at number 13 on the Top Dance/Electronic Albums chart in the United States. It reached number 44 in Italy and number 89 in France.

== Background and release ==
After the release of the group's previous album, Translation (2020), the band released a number of new singles.

In early November 2022, the group announced their new album entitled Elevation on Instagram. Like their previous album, Elevation contains fifteen songs.

== Track listing ==
Elevation track listing
| No. | Title | Writer(s) | Producer(s) | Length |
|---|---|---|---|---|
| 1. | "Simply the Best" (with Anitta and El Alfa) | William Adams; Allan Pineda; Jimmy Luis Gómez; Emanuel Herrera Batista; Damien LeRoy; Denis Zet; Jacqueline Hucke; Jerry Ropero | will.i.am; Ammo | 3:56 |
| 2. | "Muevelo" (with Anuel AA and Marshall Jefferson) | Adams; Pineda; Gómez; Enmanuel Gazmey Santiago; Marshall Julius Jefferson; A. Ridha; Dany Ocean | will.i.am; Boys Noize | 4:14 |
| 3. | "Audios" | Adams; Pineda; Gómez; Ridha; Yonatan Goldstein; Jean Baptiste; Terence DeCarlo Coles; Tatiana Randel | will.i.am; Boys Noize; Johnny Goldstein | 3:40 |
| 4. | "Double D'z" | Adams; Keith Harris; Goldstein; Antonin Georges Malherbe Didier | will.i.am | 3:20 |
| 5. | "Bailar Contigo" (with Daddy Yankee) | Adams; Pineda; Gómez; Ramón Luis Ayala Rodríguez; Goldstein; John Paúl Larkin; Antonio Nunzio Catanía | will.i.am; Johnny Goldstein | 3:43 |
| 6. | "Get Down" (with Nicky Jam) | Adams; Pineda; Gómez; Nick Rivera Caminero; Goldstein; Juan Salinas; Oscar Salinas; Andrés Jael Correa Ríos; Gerald Óscar Jiménez | will.i.am; Johnny Goldstein | 3:52 |
| 7. | "Dance 4 U" | Adams; Pineda; Gómez; Ridha; Dantae Johnson; Amelia Payne; Will Simms; Greg Simon West; Daniel Ferrari-Lane; Kenneth Burke; Kenneth Gamble | will.i.am; Boys Noize | 4:35 |
| 8. | "Guarantee" | Adams; Pineda; Gómez; Goldstein; Jonathan Spencer Wilson | will.i.am; Johnny Goldstein | 3:40 |
| 9. | "Filipina Queen" | Adams; Pineda; Goldstein; Salmin Kasimu Maengo; Baptiste | will.i.am; Johnny Goldstein | 3:30 |
| 10. | "Jump" | Adams; Goldstein | will.i.am; Johnny Goldstein | 3:36 |
| 11. | "In the Air" | Adams; Pineda; Gómez; Marco Parisi; Giampaolo Parisi; Stacy Ferguson; Johnny Hammond; Ben Cauley; James Alexander; Allen Jones; William McLean; Andrés Titus | will.i.am; Parisi | 3:40 |
| 12. | "Fire Starter" | Adams; Pineda; Gómez; Goldstein | will.i.am; Johnny Goldstein | 3:14 |
| 13. | "No One Loves Me" (with Nicole Scherzinger) | Adams; Pineda; Gómez; Damien LeRoy; Harris; James Brown | will.i.am; Ammo | 4:23 |
| 14. | "Don't You Worry" (with Shakira and David Guetta) | Adams; Pineda; Gómez; Shakira Isabel Mebarak Ripoll; David Guetta; Goldstein; Mikkel Cox; Tobías Frederiksen | will.i.am; Johnny Goldstein; David Guetta; Mikkel Cox; Tobías Frederiksen | 3:14 |
| 15. | "L.O.V.E." (with Ozuna) | Adams; Pineda; Gómez; Juan Carlos Ozuna; Goldstein | will.i.am; Johnny Goldstein | 3:57 |
| Total length: | | | | 56:23 |

== Personnel ==
Black Eyed Peas

- will.i.am – vocals on all tracks except 9 and 11, piano, keyboards, drum programming, programming
- apl.de.ap – vocals on all tracks except 4, 10, and 11
- Taboo – vocals on all tracks except 4, 9, and 10
- J. Rey Soul – vocals on tracks 4, 7–9, and 12

== Charts ==
=== Weekly charts ===
Weekly chart performance for Elevation
| Chart (2022) | Peak position |
|---|---|
| French Albums (SNEP) | 89 |
| Italian Albums (FIMI) | 44 |
| US Top Dance Albums (Billboard) | 13 |

=== Year-end charts ===
Year-end chart performance for Elevation
| Chart (2023) | Position |
|---|---|
| French Albums (SNEP) | 188 |
| Italian Albums (FIMI) | 96 |

== Certifications ==
Certifications for Elevation
| Region | Certification | Certified units/sales |
|---|---|---|
| Hungary (MAHASZ) | Gold | 2,000^{‡} |
| Italy (FIMI) | Gold | 25,000^{‡} |
| Poland (ZPAV) | Gold | 10,000^{‡} |
^{‡} Sales+streaming figures based on certification alone.
