= Latin American Music Awards of 2021 =

6th Annual Latin American Music Award
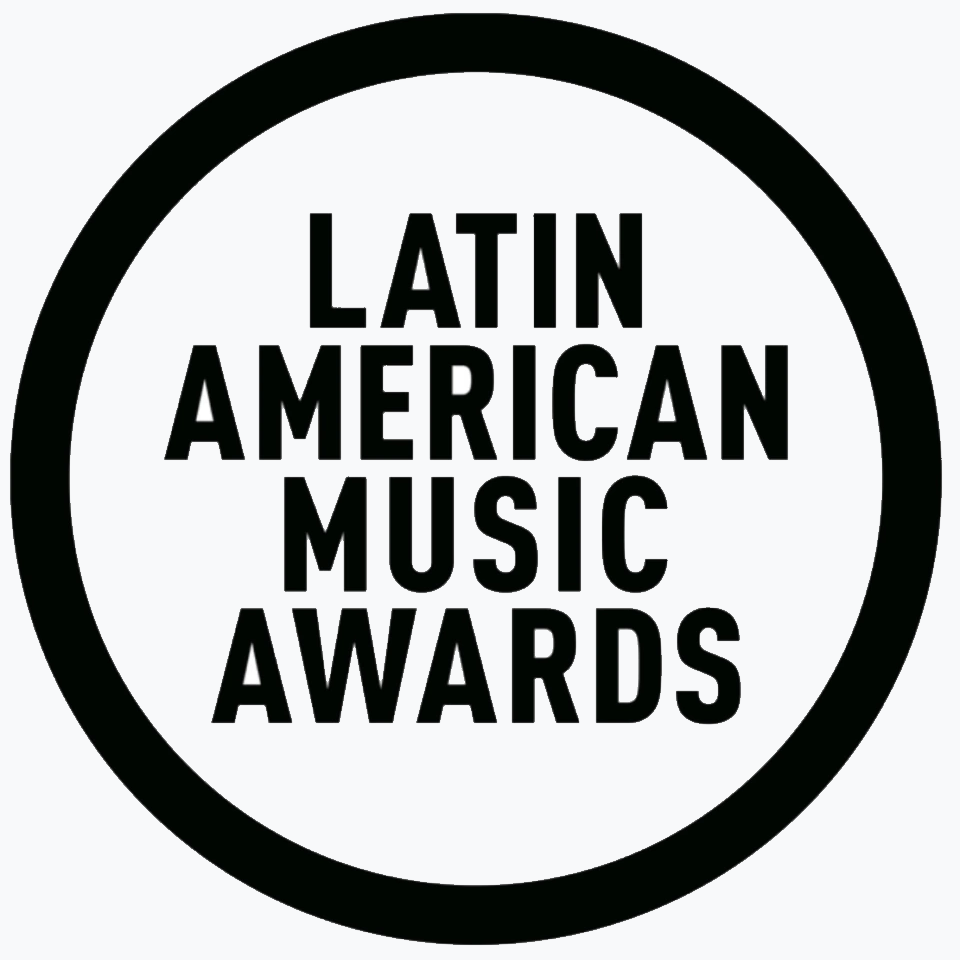
- Date: April 15, 2021
- Location: BB&T Center (Sunrise, Florida)
- Country: United States
- Hosted by: Jacky Bracamontes
- Most awards: Bad Bunny (5)
- Most nominations: J Balvin (9); Karol G (9)
- Website: Official site

Television/radio coverage
- Network: Telemundo
- Produced by: Dick Clark Productions and SOMOS Productions

The 6th Annual Latin American Music Awards were held at the BB&T Center in Sunrise, Florida. It was broadcast live on Telemundo. J Balvin and Karol G led the nominations, with nine nods each.

== Performers ==
Artist(s)	Song(s)
Wisin, Myke Towers Ft. Anitta & Maluma	"Mi Niña (Remix)"
Alaina Castillo	"Bésame Mucho"
Banda MS de Sergio Lizarraga & Carlos Rivera	"No Me Pidas Perdón"
Nicky Jam	"Fan de Tus Fotos"
Camilo & Los Dos Carnales	"Tuyo y Mío"
Eslabon Armado	"Con Tus Besos"
Myke Towers & Juhn	"Bandido"
David Bisbal Ft. Carrie Underwood	"Tears of Gold"
Gerardo Ortiz	"Historia de Ayer"
Carlos Vives & Ricky Martin	"Canción Bonita"
Juanes	"El Amor Después del Amor"
Carlos Rivera, David Bisbal & Sofía Reyes feat. Carlos Vives	Tribute to José Luis Rodríguez 'El Puma': "Yo Regresare" "Dueño de Nada" "Voy a Perder la Cabeza por tu Amor" "Agárrense de las Manos"
Manuel Turizo Ft. Wisin & Yandel	"Mala Costumbre"
Karol G & Mariah Angeliq	"El Makinon"
Yendry	"Barrio"
Joss Favela, Ana Barbara	Tribute to Joan Sebastian: "Eso y Más" "Me Gustas" "Secreto de Amor"
Natanael Cano	"Amor Tumbado"
Pitbull, El Alfa, IAmChino Ft. Lenier & Omar Courtz	"Ten Cuidado"
Ozuna	"Odisea" "Se Preparo" "Vaina Loca" "Dile Que Tu Me Quieres" "Si No Te Quiere" "Siguelo Bailando"
Maluma & Ziggy Marley	"Tonika"
Prince Royce	"Carita de Inocente"
Piso 21 Ft. Maluma	"Más de la Una"

== Presenters ==
Premiere ceremony

- Ana Bárbara
- Carlos Adyan
- Jorge Bernal
- Rodner Figueroa
- Vadhir Derbez
- Zuleyka Rivera
- Andrea Balsa

Main ceremony

- Ariadna Gutiérrez
- Alex Fernández
- Arthur Hanlon
- Alex Rose
- Adamari López
- Christian Chávez
- Chayanne
- Chesca
- Danilo Carrera
- Danny Feliz
- Emilia
- Fonseca
- Gaby Espino
- Goyo
- Jaqueline Bracamontes
- Jesús Moré
- Jessi Uribe
- Marc Anthony
- Maribel Guardia
- Ninel Conde
- Prince Royce
- Seven Kayne
- William Levy
- Zozibini Tunzi

== Winners and nominees ==
The nominations were announced on March 2, 2021.

Artist of the Year	New Artist of the Year
Bad Bunny; Anuel AA; Christian Nodal; Daddy Yankee; Eslabon Armado; J Balvin; Karol G; Maluma; Ozuna; Sech	Rauw Alejandro; Camilo; Eslabon Armado; Los Dos Carnales; Myke Towers; Natanael Cano
Favorite Female Artist	Favorite Male Artist
Anitta; Becky G; Karol G; Natti Natasha; Shakira	Bad Bunny; Anuel AA; Christian Nodal; J Balvin; Maluma; Ozuna
Song of the Year	Album of the Year
Karol G Ft. Nicki Minaj - "Tusa"; Bad Bunny - "Yo Perreo Sola"; Black Eyed Peas Ft. J Balvin - "Ritmo (Bad Boys for Life)"; Maluma & The Weeknd - "Hawái (Remix)"	Bad Bunny – YHLQMDLG; Anuel AA – Emmanuel; J Balvin – Colores; Natanael Cano – Corridos Tumbados
Favorite Duo or Group	Favorite Pop Artist
Eslabon Armado; Banda MS de Sergio Lizárraga; Jowell & Randy; Reik	Shakira; Camilo; Enrique Iglesias; Luis Fonsi; Ricky Martin
Favorite Pop Album	Favorite Pop Song
Camilo – Por Primera Vez; Kali Uchis – Sin Miedo (del Amor y Otros Demonios); Pedro Capó – Munay; Reik – Ahora	Shakira & Anuel AA - "Me Gusta"; Black Eyed Peas & Ozuna Ft. J. Rey Soul - "Mamacita"; Camilo - "Favorito"; Reik & Farruko Ft. Camilo - "Si Me Dices Que Sí"; Ricky Martin - "Tiburones"
Favorite Regional Mexican Artist	Favorite Regional Mexican Duo or Group
Christian Nodal; Carin Leon; El Fantasma; Junior H; Lenin Ramírez; Natanael Cano	Eslabon Armado; Banda MS de Segio Lizárraga; Los Ángeles Azules; Los Dos Carnales
Favorite Regional Mexican Song	Favorite Regional Mexican Album
Natanael Cano - "Amor Tumbado"; Banda Los Sebastianes de Saúl Plata - "En Eso No Quedamos"; Banda MS de Sergio Lizárraga Ft. Snoop Dogg - "Que Maldición"; Lenin Ramírez Ft. Grupo Firme - "Yo Ya No Vuelvo Contigo (En Vivo)"; Los Dos Carnales - "El Envidioso"	Christian Nodal – Ayayay!; Eslabon Armado – Tu Veneno Mortal; Junior H – Atrapado En Un Sueno; Natanael Cano – Corridos Tumbados
Favorite Urban Artist	Favorite Urban Album
Bad Bunny; Anuel AA; J Balvin; Karol G	Bad Bunny – Las Que No Iban A Salir; Anuel AA – Emmanuel; J Balvin – Colores
Favorite Urban Song	Favorite Tropical Artist
Karol G Ft. Nicki Minaj - "Tusa"; Bad Bunny - "Yo Perreo Sola"; Black Eyed Peas Ft. J Balvin - "Ritmo (Bad Boys for Life)"; Maluma & The Weeknd - "Hawái (Remix)"; Ozuna & Karol G Ft. Myke Towers - "Caramelo (Remix)"	Romeo Santos; Marc Anthony; Prince Royce; Silvestre Dangond
Favorite Tropical Album	Favorite Tropical Song
Prince Royce – Alter Ego; Carlos Vives – Cumbiana; Gloria Estefan – Brazil305	Prince Royce - "Carita de Inocente"; Alex Bueno & Romeo Santos - "Nuestro Amor"; Carlos Vives - "No Te Vayas"; Kyen?Es? - "El Carnaval de Celia: A Tribute"; Víctor Manuelle Ft. Wisin - "Boogaloo Supreme"
Favorite Crossover Artist	Collaboration of the Year
Dua Lipa; Black Eyed Peas; Ne-Yo; Snoop Dogg; The Weeknd	Karol G & Nicki Minaj - "Tusa"; Banda MS de Sergio Lizárraga Ft. Snoop Dogg - "Qué Maldición"; Black Eyed Peas Ft. J Balvin - "Ritmo (Bad Boys for Life)"; Lenin Ramírez Ft. Grupo Firme - "Yo Ya No Vuelvo Contigo (En Vivo)"; Ozuna & Karol G Ft. Myke Towers - "Caramelo (Remix)"; Reik & Farruko Ft. Camilo - "Si Me Dices Que Sí"
Social Artist of the Year	Favorite Virtual Concert
Cardi B; Anitta; Bad Bunny; Daddy Yankee; J Balvin; Jennifer Lopez; Karol G; Lali; Selena Gomez; Shakira	RBD - Ser o Parecer 2020; Alejandro Sanz & Juanes - #LaGiraSeQuedaEnCasa; Carlos Vives - #NoTeVayasDeTuCasa; Juan Luis Guerra - Privé; Juanes & Orquesta Filarmónica de Bogota - Concierto Sinfónico Virtual - #VolverteAVer; Marco Antonio Solís - Serenata a las Madres MÁS En-Cantadoras; Ozuna - #Latinosunidos; Pepe Aguilar, Ángela Aguilar & Leonardo Aguilar - Mexicano Hasta Los Huesos; Sebastián Yatra - SOSFest; Yandel - Goodbye 2020
Favorite Video
Selena Gomez - "De Una Vez"; Banda MS de Sergio Lizárraga Ft. Snoop Dogg - "Qué Maldición"; Christian Nodal Ft. Ángela Aguilar - "Dime Cómo Quieres"; David Bisbal Ft. Carrie Underwood - "Tears of Gold"; Ozuna, Doja Cat Ft. Sia - "Del Mar"; Rosalía Ft. Travis Scott - "TKN"

== Multiple nominations and awards ==
Acts that received multiple nominations
Nominations	Act
9	J Balvin
9	Karol G
8	Bad Bunny
7	Ozuna
6	Anuel AA
6	Camilo
5	Banda Sinaloense MS de Sergio Lizárraga
5	Black Eyed Peas
5	Christian Nodal
5	Eslabon Armado
5	Natanael Cano
4	Maluma
4	Reik
4	Shakira
4	Snoop Dogg
3	Carlos Vives
3	Lenin Ramirez
3	Los Dos Carnales
3	Myke Towers
3	Nicki Minaj
3	Prince Royce
3	The Weeknd
2	Ángela Aguilar
2	Anitta
2	Daddy Yankee
2	Farruko
2	Grupo Firme
2	Juanes
2	Junior H
2	Ricky Martin
2	Romeo Santos
2	Selena Gomez

Acts that received multiple awards
Awards	Act
5	Bad Bunny
3	Karol G
3	Nicki Minaj
2	Christian Nodal
2	Eslabon Armado
2	Prince Royce

=== Special awards ===
- Icon Award: Alejandro Fernández
- Legend Award: José Luis Rodríguez 'El Puma'
- Extraordinary Evolution Award: Ozuna
