= Simply the Best (song) =

Single by Black Eyed Peas, Anitta and El Alfa

from the album Elevation
- Released: October 28, 2022
- Length: 3:56
- Label: Epic
- Songwriters: William Adams; Damien LeRoy; Emmanuel Herrera Batista; Allan Pineda; Jimmy Luis Gomez; Denis Zet; Jacqueline Hucke; Jerry Ropero

Black Eyed Peas singles chronology
"Don't You Worry" (2022)	"Simply the Best" (2022)	"Double D'z" (2022)

Anitta singles chronology
"Lobby" (2022)	"Simply the Best" (2022)	"Ai Papai" (2022)

El Alfa singles chronology
"Gogo Dance" (2022)	"Simply the Best" (2022)	"Plebada" (2023)

Music video
- "Simply the Best" on YouTube

"Simply the Best" (stylized in all caps) is a song by American hip hop group Black Eyed Peas, Brazilian singer Anitta and Dominican rapper El Alfa. It was written by William Adams, Damien LeRoy, Emmanuel Herrera Batista, Allan Pineda and Jimmy Luis Gomez. Denis Zet, Jacqueline Hucke and Jerry Ropero are also listed as songwriters as the song features samples from their 2005 song "Coraçao".

== Live performances ==
The group performed the song live at the 2023 Sanremo Festival.

== Charts ==
=== Weekly charts ===
Chart performance for "Simply the Best"
Chart (2022–2024)	Peak position
Argentina Anglo (Monitor Latino)	7
Canada CHR/Top 40 (Billboard)	47
Central America Anglo (Monitor Latino)	1
Chile Anglo (Monitor Latino)	7
CIS Airplay (TopHit)	92
Colombia Anglo (Monitor Latino)	13
Estonia Airplay (TopHit)	15
France Airplay (SNEP)	50
France Club 40 (SNEP)	9
Honduras Anglo (Monitor Latino)	16
Hungary (Dance Top 40)	13
Italy (FIMI)	95
Lithuania Airplay (TopHit)	38
San Marino (SMRRTV Top 50)	3
Suriname (Nationale Top 40)	25
Turkey (Radiomonitor Türkiye)	4
US Hot Dance/Electronic Songs (Billboard)	30
US Pop Airplay (Billboard)	31
Venezuela Anglo (Monitor Latino)	3

=== Monthly charts ===
Monthly chart performance for "Simply the Best"
Chart (2023)	Peak position
CIS Airplay (TopHit)	96
Estonia Airplay (TopHit)	20
Lithuania Airplay (TopHit)	52

=== Year-end charts ===
2023 year-end chart performance for "Simply the Best"
Chart (2023)	Position
Hungary (Dance Top 40)	47

2024 year-end chart performance for "Simply the Best"
Chart (2024)	Position
Hungary (Dance Top 40)	58

2025 year-end chart performance for "Simply the Best"
Chart (2025)	Position
Hungary (Dance Top 40)	64

== Certifications ==
Certifications for "Simply the Best"
Region	Certification	Certified units/sales
Italy (FIMI)	Gold	50,000^{‡}
^{‡} Sales+streaming figures based on certification alone.

== Release history ==
Release dates and formats for "Simply the Best"
Region	Date	Format	Label	Ref.
Various	October 28, 2022	Digital download; streaming	Epic	
Italy	November 3, 2022	Radio airplay	Sony	
France	November 7, 2022	Radio airplay; digital download; streaming	Polydor	
