= Mamacita (Black Eyed Peas, Ozuna and J. Rey Soul song) =

Single by Black Eyed Peas and Ozuna

from the album Translation
- Released: April 10, 2020
- Genre: Moombahton
- Length: 4:10 (album version); 3:40 (radio edit)
- Label: Epic
- Songwriters: Allan Pineda; Bruce Gaitsch; Juan Rosado; Madonna; Patrick Leonard; Susan Leonard; William Adams; Yonatan Goldstein
- Producers: will.i.am; Johnny Goldstein (co.)

Black Eyed Peas singles chronology
"Ritmo (Bad Boys for Life)" (2019)	"Mamacita" (2020)	"Feel the Beat" (2020)

Ozuna singles chronology
"Temporal" (2020)	"Mamacita" (2020)	"Caramelo" (2020)

Music video
- "Mamacita" on YouTube

"Mamacita" is a song recorded by American group Black Eyed Peas and Puerto Rican singer Ozuna from the group's eighth studio album Translation. Filipina-American singer J. Rey Soul, who joined the group in 2018, is also credited as a lead artist. It was released as a single on April 10, 2020.

== Background and composition ==
"Mamacita" marks the second release from the Black Eyed Peas since signing to their new label Epic Records, after "Ritmo (Bad Boys For Life)" with J Balvin.

The song sampled Madonna's Latin pop song "La Isla Bonita" and was produced by group's member will.i.am and Johnny Goldstein. Goldstein in an interview with Variety explained the decision of the song sounds and the use of Madonna's sample:

In Reggaeton and in Arabic music, there are a few patterns that are the same: the tones and frequencies may be different, but the actual notes, on some of them, are the in the same spots on the scale. [...] We started that one because Will had this idea to use Madonna’s "La Isla Bonita" in a song. So, I started a beat with this progression, then he wrote the hook and his parts, and then we did some back and forth with the beat like we always do, which means just hours of Facetime in order to make the production minimal, but super unique. In fact, for the whole album, we tried to keep everything super minimalistic and unique, but this song in particular is a good example of that.

— Johnny Goldstein on "Mamacita"

== Critics reception ==
Billboard's writer Jason Lipshutz defined that the song "refuses to let you listen while sitting down" thanks to "an amalgamation of sounds and influences", associating it with "Taki Taki". Lipshutz also pointed out that Latin rhythms prove to be a "concrete formola" for the group's "revival". A.D. Amorosi of Variety wrote that the semple of "La Isla Bonita" figured as "a master stroke of pop mimicry" with the featured artist "help turn the torrid track into something graceful and gritty". Gary Suarez, reviewing the album for Rolling Stone, focused on the featured artist, writing that "ostensibly Fergie’s replacement, J. Rey Soul brings a higher caliber of vocal talent" and that she works as a "complementary presence alongside Ozuna on “Mamacita” in particular doing much needed damage control on behalf of a group so clearly out of its element".

== Accolades ==
Award nominations for "Mamacita"
Year	Ceremony	Award	Result	Ref.
2020	MTV Video Music Awards	Best Latin	Nominated	
2021	Latin American Music Awards	Favorite Pop Song	Nominated	
2021	Billboard Latin Music Awards	Sales Song of the Year	Nominated	
2021	Billboard Latin Music Awards	Latin Pop Song of the Year	Won	
2021	Premio Lo Nuestro	Crossover Collaboration of the Year	Nominated	

== Music video ==
The accompanying music video was directed by Director X. The set of the video is set in a 60s-style hotel, seeing members of the group dancing with Ozuna and introducing J. Rey Soul to the audience.

== Charts ==
=== Weekly charts ===
Chart (2020–2021)	Peak position
Global 200 (Billboard)	65
Argentina Hot 100 (Billboard)	76
Austria (Ö3 Austria Top 40)	44
Belgium (Ultratop 50 Flanders)	4
Belgium (Ultratop 50 Wallonia)	1
Canada Hot 100 (Billboard)	11
CIS Airplay (TopHit)	12
Czech Republic Singles Digital (ČNS IFPI)	38
Finland (Suomen virallinen lista)	11
France (SNEP)	7
Germany (GfK)	31
Hungary (Dance Top 40)	2
Hungary (Rádiós Top 40)	18
Hungary (Single Top 40)	19
Hungary (Stream Top 40)	31
Israel International Airplay (Media Forest)	3
Italy (FIMI)	2
Netherlands (Dutch Top 40)	5
Netherlands (Single Top 100)	6
Panama Airplay (Monitor Latino)	7
Poland Airplay (ZPAV)	7
Portugal (AFP)	10
Romania (Airplay 100)	25
Russia Airplay (TopHit)	5
San Marino Airplay (SMRTV Top 50)	39
Slovakia Airplay (ČNS IFPI)	22
Slovakia Singles Digital (ČNS IFPI)	21
Spain (PROMUSICAE)	29
Sweden Heatseeker (Sverigetopplistan)	3
Switzerland (Schweizer Hitparade)	7
US Billboard Hot 100	62
US Adult Pop Airplay (Billboard)	36
US Hot Latin Songs (Billboard)	1
US Latin Airplay (Billboard)	1
US Pop Airplay (Billboard)	21
US Rhythmic Airplay (Billboard)	17

=== Year-end charts ===
Chart (2020)	Position
Belgium (Ultratop Flanders)	34
Belgium (Ultratop Wallonia)	17
Canada (Canadian Hot 100)	47
CIS (TopHit)	43
France (SNEP)	29
Germany (Official German Charts)	87
Hungary (Dance Top 40)	37
Italy (FIMI)	14
Netherlands (Dutch Top 40)	17
Netherlands (Single Top 100)	25
Poland (ZPAV)	85
Romania (Airplay 100)	86
Russia Airplay (TopHit)	46
Spain (PROMUSICAE)	92
Switzerland (Schweizer Hitparade)	28
Turkey (Radiomonitor International List)	7
US Hot Latin Songs (Billboard)	8
US Latin Airplay (Billboard)	16

Chart (2021)	Position
CIS (TopHit)	135
Hungary (Dance Top 40)	10
Hungary (Rádiós Top 40)	93
Russia Airplay (TopHit)	126

== Certifications ==
Region	Certification	Certified units/sales
Austria (IFPI Austria)	Gold	15,000^{‡}
Belgium (BRMA)	Platinum	40,000^{‡}
Canada (Music Canada)	2× Platinum	160,000^{‡}
France (SNEP)	Diamond	333,333^{‡}
Germany (BVMI)	Gold	200,000^{‡}
Italy (FIMI)	3× Platinum	210,000^{‡}
Mexico (AMPROFON)	2× Platinum+Gold	150,000^{‡}
Poland (ZPAV)	2× Platinum	40,000^{‡}
Portugal (AFP)	Platinum	10,000^{‡}
Spain (Promusicae)	Platinum	40,000^{‡}
Switzerland (IFPI Switzerland)	Platinum	20,000^{‡}
United States (RIAA)	Platinum	1,000,000^{‡}
Streaming
Central America (CFC)	Platinum	7,000,000^{†}
^{‡} Sales+streaming figures based on certification alone.^{†} Streaming-only figures based on certification alone.

== Release history ==
Release dates and formats for "Mamacita"
Region	Date	Format	Label	Ref.
Italy	April 10, 2020	Contemporary hit radio	Sony	
Russia	April 18, 2020	Contemporary hit radio	Sony	

== See also ==
- List of Billboard number-one Latin songs of 2020
