= Lorena B =

Israeli electronic band

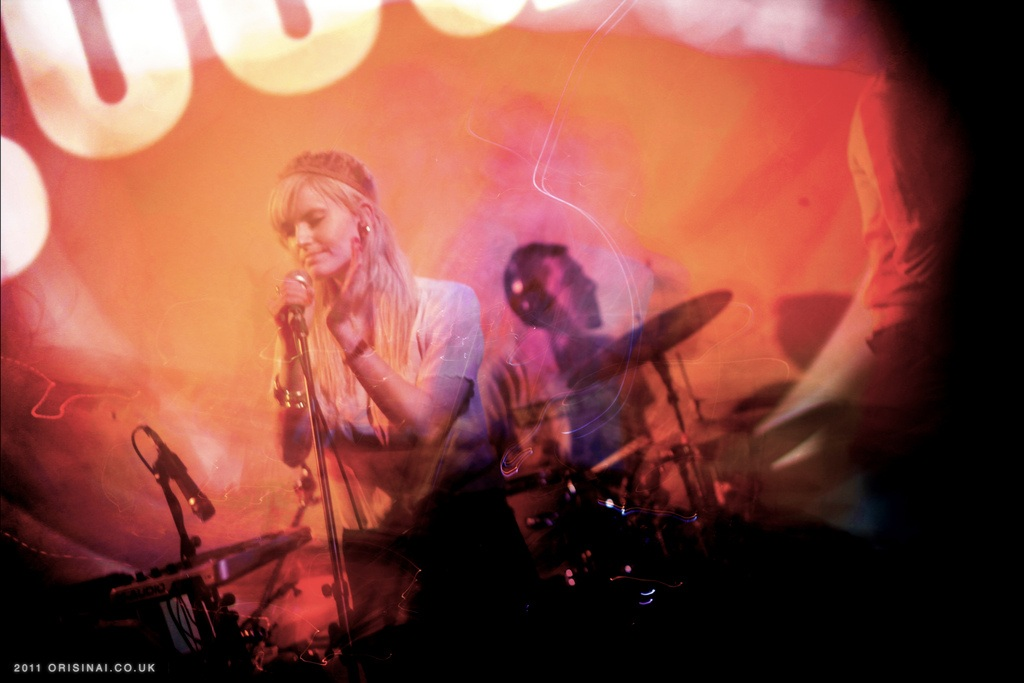
- Lorena B performing live at The Good Ship in London launching their 2011 UK Tour

Background information
- Origin: Jerusalem
- Genres: Electronica, Post-dubstep, alternative Rock
- Years active: 2010–2012
- Past members: Adi Ulmansky; Yoav Sa'ar; Roi Avital
- Website: lorena-b.com

Lorena B was an Israeli electronic band, whose music is a fusion of soft Icelandic sounds and harsh electronica. Today, Yoav and Roi are working with Johnny Sharoni on their new band "Garden City Movement". Adi continued solo.

== Biography ==
Lorena B combines vocals, electronic beats, and a unique sound. Since its inception, the band has created a live show with a variety of sounds, mixing rock and electronica. With the release of their self-produced debut album, Siblings, Lorena B went on their first tour in the UK. Songs from the album were played on the Jarvis Cocker's Sunday Service show on BBC Radio 6 Music, London's XFM, and on many blogs around the net. The first single, "Swallow my Gum" released a music video that received media comment, and has been played on MTV IL. Since the band's conception, Lorena B has cooperated with DJs, such as dubstep producer Borgore; they have also played as main support for the American rock trio Blonde Redhead and for the Canadian electro duo, Junior Boys.

== Siblings ==
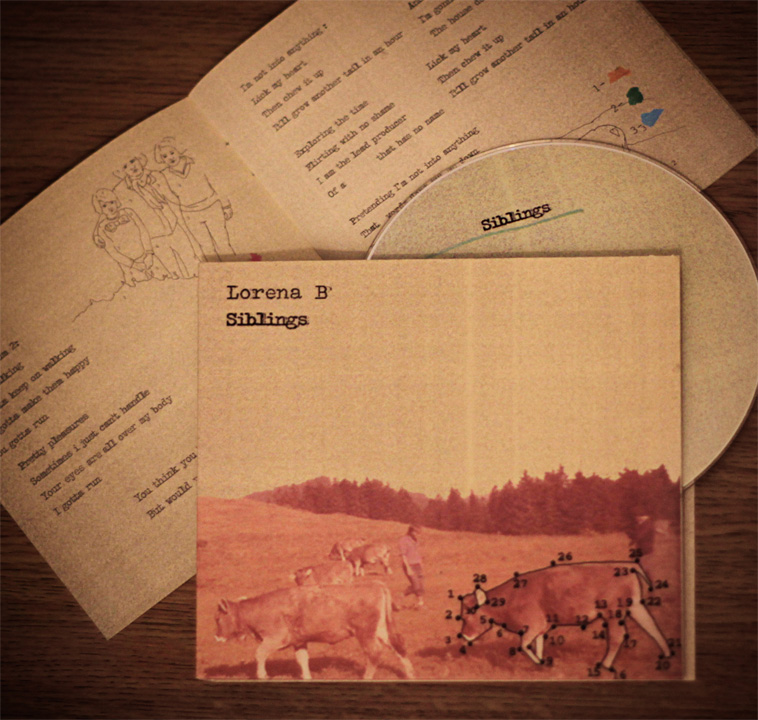
Lorena B's Debut Album "Siblings"

Siblings (Released 30 April 2011) was self-produced by the band in a process that took over a year. The album's personal and warm sound has been described as a rich and colourful musical experience, taking the listener seamlessly through different musical landscapes from delicate to violent emotions.

=== Track listing ===
1. "Flamingo Pink" – 1:32
2. "Intro" – 2:00
3. "Swallow my Gum" – 5:01
4. "Swallow my Gum 2" – 3:31
5. "The Queen's Speech" – 1:28
6. "I'm Not Intro Anything" – 4:19
7. "Limbo Love" – 4:04
8. "I am Something" – 3:33
9. "Bonus Track" – 2:53

=== UK tour ===
During the last few days of the band's UK tour for their debut album, they stumbled upon Jarvis Cocker in Central London, in a friendly encounter, they gave him a copy of their album, not knowing that he will play their track "Intro" on his radio show "Sunday Service" on BBC Radio 6 Music the following day. Cocker introduced the song by amusingly mentioning that it's not the first track of the album.

== EP ==
The self-titled EP was released in mid January 2012, "UR" and "ReFeel" from the EP have premiered online and performed live on stage in late 2011 which made it clear that the musical direction has developed into a new electronic-based, Post-dubstep sound.

=== Track listing ===
1. "UR" – 5:06
2. "Jelly Pen For Jelly Words" – 3:22
3. "Safe Steps" – 2:44
4. "Waste" – 3:29
5. "Golden Crown" – 2:34
6. "Re-Feel" – 3:47
7. "Waste (Chopped & Screwed)" – 4:54

== Music videos ==
Lorena B is known for its emphasis on visual and experimental components associated with their musical productions.

Year	Title	Director
2011	"Swallow my Gum"	Ido Shor
2011	"I am Something"	Pavel Bolo
2011	"The Queen's Speech"	Ori Sinai
2011	"Swallow my Gum 2"	Ori Sinai
2011	"UR"	Ori Sinai
