= Cherish (My Love) =

- Remixes cover

Single by Illit

from the EP I'll Like You
- Language: Korean
- Released: October 21, 2024
- Genre: Dance-pop
- Length: 2:57
- Label: Belift Lab
- Songwriters: Deputy; Andrew Jackson; Sarah "Solly" Solovay; Charli; Akap; "Hitman" Bang; Kim Kiwi; Supreme Boi; Danke; Divahh; Vincenzo; Jude; Shinkung; Ssac (MUMW)
- Producers: Deputy; Akap

Illit singles chronology
"Magnetic" (2024)	"Cherish (My Love)" (2024)	"Baby It's Both (Tick-Tack English Ver.)" (2024)

Music video
- "Cherish (My Love)" on YouTube

"Cherish (My Love)" is a song recorded by South Korean girl group Illit for their second extended play I'll Like You. It was released as the EP's lead single by Belift Lab on October 21, 2024.

== Background and release ==
On September 23, 2024, Belift Lab announced that Illit would be releasing their second extended play titled I'll Like You on October 21. On October 7, the track listing was released with "Cherish (My Love)" announced as the lead single. Six days later, the highlight medley teaser video was released. On October 17, a portion of the choreography was released, followed by the music video teaser a day later. The song was released alongside its music video and the extended play on October 21. The remixes version was released on October 28.

== Composition ==
"Cherish (My Love)" was written and produced by Deputy and Akap with Andrew Jackson, Sarah "Solly" Solovay, Charli, Akap, "Hitman" Bang, Kim Kiwi, Supreme Boi, Danke, Divahh, Vincenzo, Jude, Shin-kung, Ssac (Mumw) participating in the writing. It was described as a dance-pop song with lyrics "that says that I am curious about your heart, but my feelings of liking you are more important than that".

== Promotion ==
Prior to the release of I'll Like You, on October 21, 2024, Illit held a live event aimed at introducing the extended play and its songs, including "Cherish (My Love)". They subsequently performed on four music programs: Mnet's M Countdown on October 24, KBS's Music Bank on October 25, MBC's Show! Music Core on October 26, and SBS's Inkigayo on October 27.

== Accolades ==
Award ceremony	Year	Category	Result	Ref.
MAMA Awards	2025	Best Dance Performance – Female Group	Nominated	
MAMA Awards	2025	Song of the Year	Nominated	

== Track listing ==
- Digital download / streaming – Original
1. "Cherish (My Love)" – 2:57
- Digital download / streaming – Remixes
1. "Cherish (My Love)" – 2:57
2. "Cherish (My Love)" (Deep Dive remix) – 2:28
3. "Cherish (My Love)" (Moonlight remix) – 3:24
4. "Cherish (My Love)" (Fever remix) – 2:46
5. "Cherish (My Love)" (Sped Up) – 2:16
6. "Cherish (My Love)" (Slowed + Reverb) – 3:41
7. "Cherish (My Love)" (Instrumental) – 2:57

== Credits and personnel ==
- Illit – lead vocals
  - Yunah – background vocals
  - Minju – background vocals
  - Wonhee – background vocals
- Deputy – keyboard, synthesize
- Akap – keyboard, synthesizer, guitar, bass, drum programming
- Slow Rabbit – vocal arrangement, digital editing
- Jon Castelli – mixing
- Chris Gehringer – mastering
- Brad Lauchert – mix engineering
- Slow Rabbit – engineering

== Charts ==
=== Weekly charts ===
Weekly chart performance
Chart (2024)	Peak position
Global 200 (Billboard)	110
Hong Kong (Billboard)	12
Japan (Japan Hot 100)	35
Japan Combined Singles (Oricon)	43
Malaysia (Billboard)	24
Malaysia International (RIM)	17
New Zealand Hot Singles (RMNZ)	28
Singapore (RIAS)	22
South Korea (Circle)	22
Taiwan (Billboard)	10

=== Monthly charts ===
Monthly chart performance for "Cherish (My Love)"
Chart (2024)	Position
South Korea (Circle)	27

=== Year-end charts ===
Year-end chart performance for "Cherish (My Love)"
Chart (2025)	Position
South Korea (Circle)	131

== Release history ==
Release history
Region	Date	Format	Version	Label
Various	October 21, 2024	Digital download; streaming	Original	Belift Lab
Various	October 28, 2024	Digital download; streaming	Remixes	Belift Lab
