= Adi Ulmansky =

Israeli musical artist

Adi Ulmansky עדי אולמנסקי
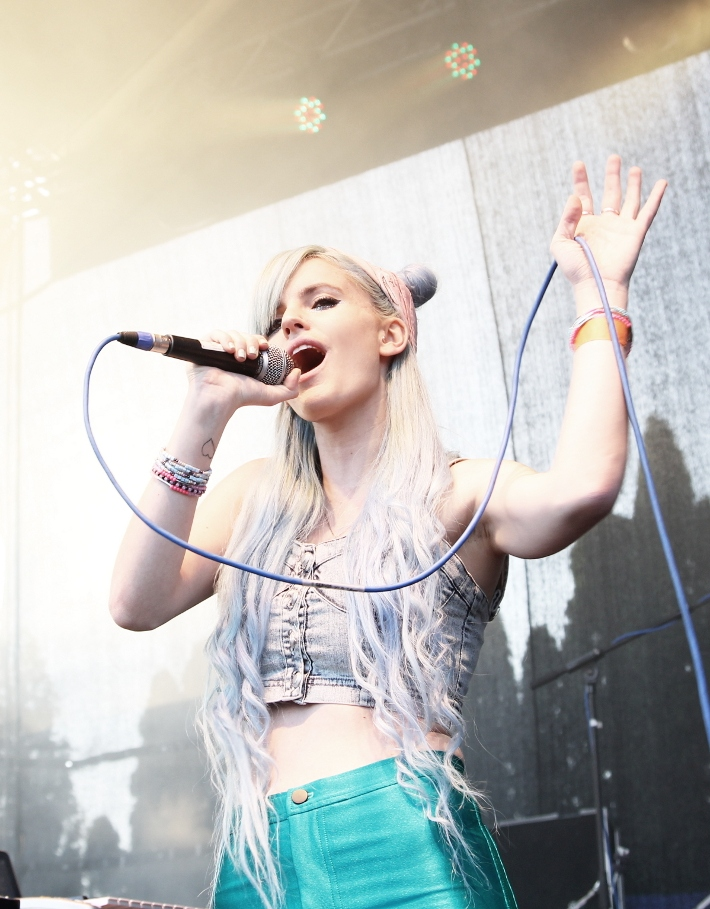

Background information
- Born: Adi Ulmansky
- Origin: Jerusalem
- Genres: Electronica, hip hop, trap, chillwave
- Occupations: Producer, singer-songwriter, rapper
- Years active: 2007-present
- Formerly of: Lorena B
- Website: adiulmansky.com

Adi Ulmansky (Hebrew: עדי אולמנסקי) is a rapper and music producer originally from Jerusalem.

== Music career ==
Since 2007, Ulmansky has made several TV appearances and released several music videos to Israeli music TV channel Music 24 and MTV Israel, including collaborations with leading directors like Vania Heymann. Adi released her debut solo mixtape 'Shit Just Got Real' in January 2013 and her following solo EP 'Hurricane Girl' in August 2013. Adi was also the founder and leader of the band Lorena B and also collaborated with other artists like Johnny Goldstein as well as the producer Borgore with whom she released several high-profile tracks like 'Someone Else's' with 1.5 million views on YouTube. She's been focusing on her solo career since late 2012, getting a lot of worldwide online and printed press coverage from Vice, Mixmag, The Guardian, Jay-Z's Life + Times, The Independent, leading local press like Yedioth Ahronoth, Maariv and Haaretz newspapers to fashion coverage like Topshop Inside-Out official blog and ASOS.com blog and mobile app, and many more. Her latest single and music video 'Falling' has premiered on Vice's 'You Need To Hear This' section as well as getting into the playlists of popular radio stations in Israel - Galgalatz, IBA's 88FM and others.

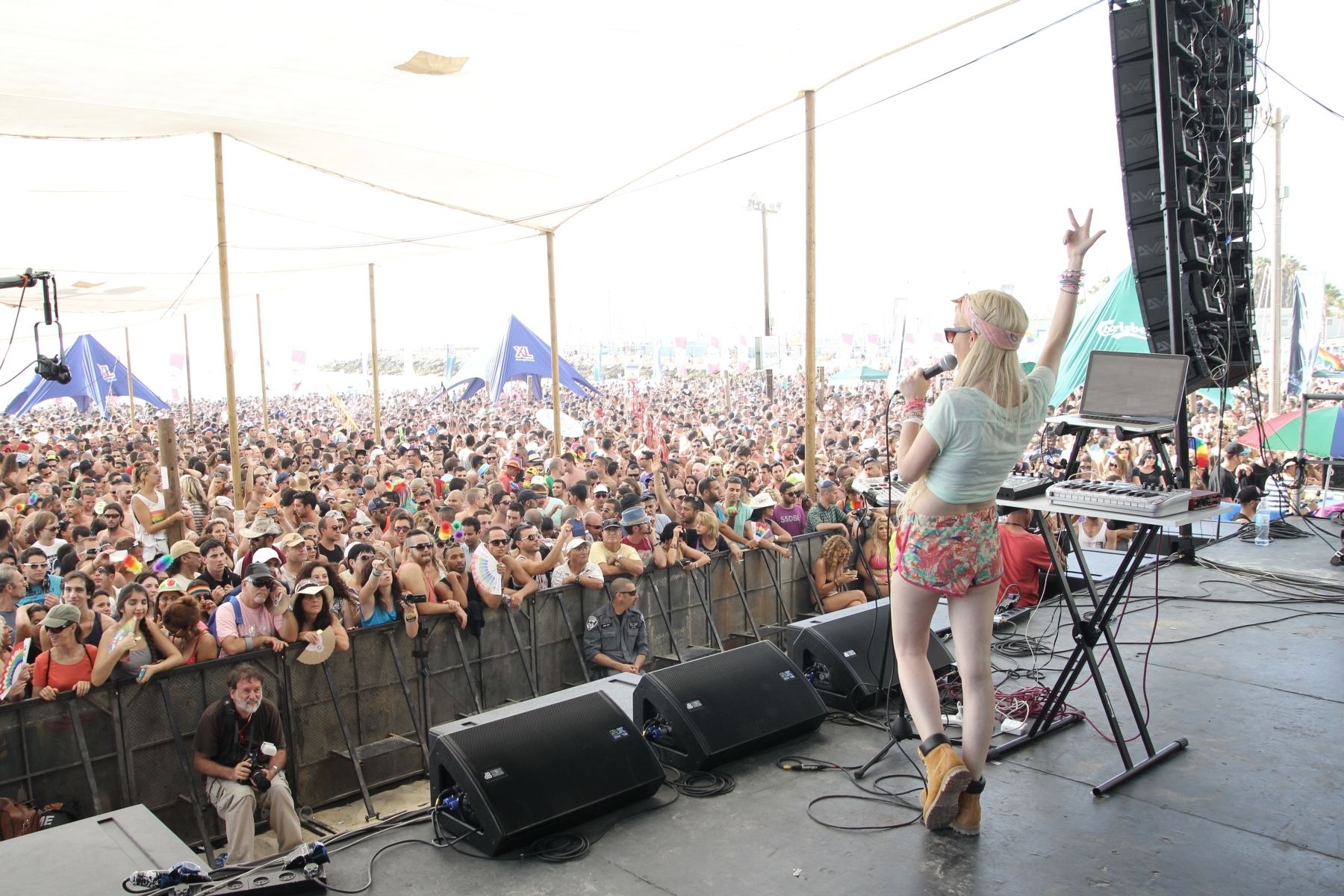
Adi Ulmansky in Tel Aviv Gay Pride Parade 2013

In 2012, Ulmansky was selected by American Express for their The Young Professionals project as the only musician from a group of 9 leading young individuals in Israel. The project accompanied the re-launching of American Express BLUE card in Israel and was a collaboration with the band TYP, Keshet TV's Mako and Timeout Tel Aviv.

In June 2014, Ulmansky performed at Glastonbury Festival.

In October 2015, Ulmansky released "Pink Pillz"

In August 2016, Ulmansky released "Higher" featuring rapper Curtis Williams. In November 2016, Ulmansky released "Dreamin'" featuring rapper KDC, The main song off her new EP by the same name. On 9 December 2016, Ulmansky released her EP, Dreamin' .

On 15 October 2018, Ulmansky released her debut album, BAD INTENTIONS.

== Discography ==
=== Solo albums ===
- Shit Just Got Real mixtape (2013)
- Hurricane Girl EP (2013)
- DREAMIN' EP (2016)
- BAD INTENTIONS (2019)

=== Lorena B albums ===
- Siblings (2011)
- Lorena B EP (2012)

=== Features ===
- The Johnny Show (2008) - Lishkoah Meakol Ft. Adi Ulmansky (Hebrew: לשכוח מהכל)
- Gorestep: Vol. 1.1 (2009; Shift Recordings) - 5 Years VIP (Björk's cover) Ft. Adi Ulmansky
- Borgore Ruined Dubstep, Pt. 2 (2010; Buygore) - Broken Rulz feat. Adi Ulmansky
- Delicious EP (2011; Buygore) - Someone Else's' (feat. Adi Ulmansky)
- Turn Up EP (October 8, 2012) - Why Does It Feel Borgore feat. Adi Ulmansky
- Legend EP (June 7, 2013; Buygore) - Kill Them All (feat. Adi Ulmansky)

== Music videos ==
Ulmansky's visual style varies with each collaboration and video production.

Year	Title	Director
2012	"I Always Liked Men With Good Hands"	Ori Sinai
2012	"A.D.I"	Vania Heymann
2013	"One Octave Up"	Ori Sinai
2013	"My Heart"	Adi Ulmansky, Nir Perry
2013	"Stop This Train"	Yonathan Weitzman
2013	"Gurl Powa"	Adi Ulmansky, Nir Perry
2013	"Falling"	Adi Ulmansky, Nir Perry, Ori Sinai
2014	"Was It You? featuring Borgore"	Gal Muggia
