= I'll Like You =

- Digital cover

EP by Illit
- Released: October 21, 2024
- Length: 12:18
- Languages: Korean; English
- Labels: Belift Lab; Genie; Stone
- Producers: Divahh; Albin Tengbald; Deputy; Akap; Deez; SoulFish; Johnny Goldstein; "Hitman" Bang; Slow Rabbit; Shinkung

Illit chronology
Super Real Me (2024)	I'll Like You (2024)	Bomb (2025)

Singles from I'll Like You
- 1. "Cherish (My Love)" Released: October 21, 2024

Professional ratings
Review scores
Source	Rating
NME	3/5 stars

I'll Like You is the second extended play by South Korean girl group Illit. It was released by Belift Lab on October 21, 2024, and contains five tracks including the lead single "Cherish (My Love)".

== Background and release ==
On September 23, 2024, Belift Lab announced that Illit would be releasing their second extended play titled I'll Like You on October 21. The promotional schedule was also released on the same day. A day later, the brand film was released. The concept photos and films were released from September 30 starting with the "With version", followed by the "To version" a day later, and the "Between version" on October 2. On October 7, the track listing was released with "Cherish (My Love)" announced as the lead single, the track videos for all of the songs were also released on the same day. Six days later, the highlight medley teaser video was released. On October 17, a portion of the choreography for "Cherish (My Love)" was released, followed by the music video teaser a day later. The extended play was released alongside the music video for "Cherish (My Love)" on October 21.

A music video for "Tick-Tack" was released on November 14, 2024, the pop-electronic song was highlighted by NME's Mika Chen as a standout track for its "unapologetic chiptune-heavy fare" and departure from the easy listening trend, being more maximalistic, compared to the lead single's minimalistic approach. Later on November 22, 2024, an English version of Tick-Tack titled "Baby It's Both" with American singer Ava Max was released.

== Track listing ==
I'll Like You track listing
No.	Title	Writer(s)	Producer(s)	Length
1.	"I'll Like You"	Divahh; Albin Tengblad; Lara Andersson; Von Tiger; Moon Ji-young (Lalala Studio); Lee Yi-jin; Danke; Moon Yeo-reum (Jam Factory)	Divahh; Albin Tengblad	2:08
2.	"Cherish (My Love)"	Deputy; Andrew Jackson; Sarah "Solly" Solovay; Charli; Akap; "Hitman" Bang; Kim Kiwi; Supreme Boi; Danke (Lalala Studio); Divahh; Vincenzo; Jude; Shinkung; Ssac (MUMW)	Deputy; Akap	2:57
3.	"IYKYK (If You Know You Know)"	Deez; SoulFish; Bekuh Boom; "Hitman" Bang; Jude; Lee-kyung (Wavecloud); January 8th; Divahh; Lee Yi-jin; Moon Yeo-reum (Jam Factory); So Do-hyun (Wavecloud); Vendor (Chiller)	Deez; SoulFish	2:24
4.	"Pimple"	Divahh; Ryu Hyun-woo; Ciara Muscat; Malin Christin; January 8th; Noémie Legrand; Lee Seu-ran; Moon Ji-young (Lalala Studio); Forever Noh; Jang Jeong-won (Jam Factory); Vincenzo; Exy; Sohlhee; Zara Christenson; "Hitman" Bang	Divahh	2:40
5.	"Tick-Tack"	Johnny Goldstein; Sam Martin; "Hitman" Bang; Divahh; Slow Rabbit; Shinkung; Tatte; January 8th; Jude; Na Do-yeon (153/Joombas); Choi Mei (153/Joombas); Kim Su-ji (Lalala Studio); Moon Ji-young (Lalala Studio)	Johnny Goldstein; "Hitman" Bang; Divahh; Slow Rabbit; Shinkung	2:09
Total length:				12:18

== Personnel ==
=== Musicians ===
- Illit – lead vocals (all tracks)
  - Yunah – gang vocals (1), background vocals (2, 5)
  - Minju – gang vocals (1), background vocals (2)
  - Moka – gang vocals (1)
  - Wonhee – gang vocals (1), background vocals (2)
  - Iroha – gang vocals (1)
- Divahh – keyboards, vocal arrangement, digital editing (1, 4, 5); drums (1, 4), bass (4)
- Albin Tengblad – keyboards, bass, drums (1)
- Deputy – keyboards, synthesizer (2)
- Akap – keyboards, synthesizer, guitar, bass, drum programming (2)
- Slow Rabbit – vocal arrangement, digital editing (2)
- Deez – keyboards, synthesizer, bass, drum programming (3)
- SoulFish – keyboards, synthesizer, bass, drum programming (3)
- Shin-kung – vocal arrangement, digital editing (3); keyboards (5)
- Tak Hyeon-gwan – digital editing (3)
- Ryu Hyeon-woo – keyboards, guitar (4)
- Johnny Goldstein – keyboards, synthesizer, bass, drum programming, digital editing (5)
- "Hitman" Bang – keyboards (5)
- Lara Andersson – background vocals (1)
- Von Tiger – background vocals (1)
- Emily Yeonseo Kim – background vocals (3)
- Bekuh Boom – background vocals, additional arrangement (3)
- Sohia Pae – background vocals (4)
- Sam Martin – background vocals (5)

=== Technical ===
- Lee Yeon-soo – mixing (1), engineering (1, 4)
- Jon Castelli – mixing (2)
- Josh Gudwin – mixing (3)
- Jeon Bu-yeon – mixing (4)
- Kevin Grainger – mixing (5)
- Chris Gehringer – mastering
- Brad Lauchert – mix engineering (2)
- Felix Byrne – mixing assistance (3)
- Slow Rabbit – engineering (2)
- Tak Hyeon-gwan – engineering (3)
- Lee Dong-geun - engineering (5)

== Charts ==
=== Weekly charts ===
Weekly chart performance for I'll Like You
Chart (2024–2026)	Peak position
Belgian Albums (Ultratop Flanders)	93
French Albums (SNEP)	138
Greek Albums (IFPI)	36
Hungarian Physical Albums (MAHASZ)	13
Japanese Albums (Oricon)	2
Japanese Combined Albums (Oricon)	2
Japanese Hot Albums (Billboard Japan)	2
Scottish Albums (Official Charts)	95
South Korean Albums (Circle)	2
Swedish Physical Albums (Sverigetopplistan)	18
UK Physical Albums (OCC)	98
US Billboard 200	94
US World Albums (Billboard)	2

=== Monthly charts ===
Monthly chart performance for I'll Like You
Chart (2024)	Peak position
Japanese Albums (Oricon)	10
South Korean Albums (Circle)	5

=== Year-end charts ===
Year-end chart performance for I'll Like You
Chart (2024)	Position
South Korean Albums (Circle)	56

== Certifications ==
Certifications for I'll Like You
Region	Certification	Certified units/sales
South Korea (KMCA)	2× Platinum	500,000^{^}
^{^} Shipments figures based on certification alone.

== Release history ==
Release history for I'll Like You
Region	Date	Format	Label	Ref.
Various	October 21, 2024	Digital download; streaming	Belift Lab	
South Korea	October 21, 2024	CD	Belift Lab	
Japan	October 21, 2024	CD	Belift Lab	
United States	October 21, 2024	CD	Belift Lab	
