= Johnny Goldstein =

Israeli record producer and songwriter

Johnny Goldstein יונתן "ג'וני" גולדשטיין
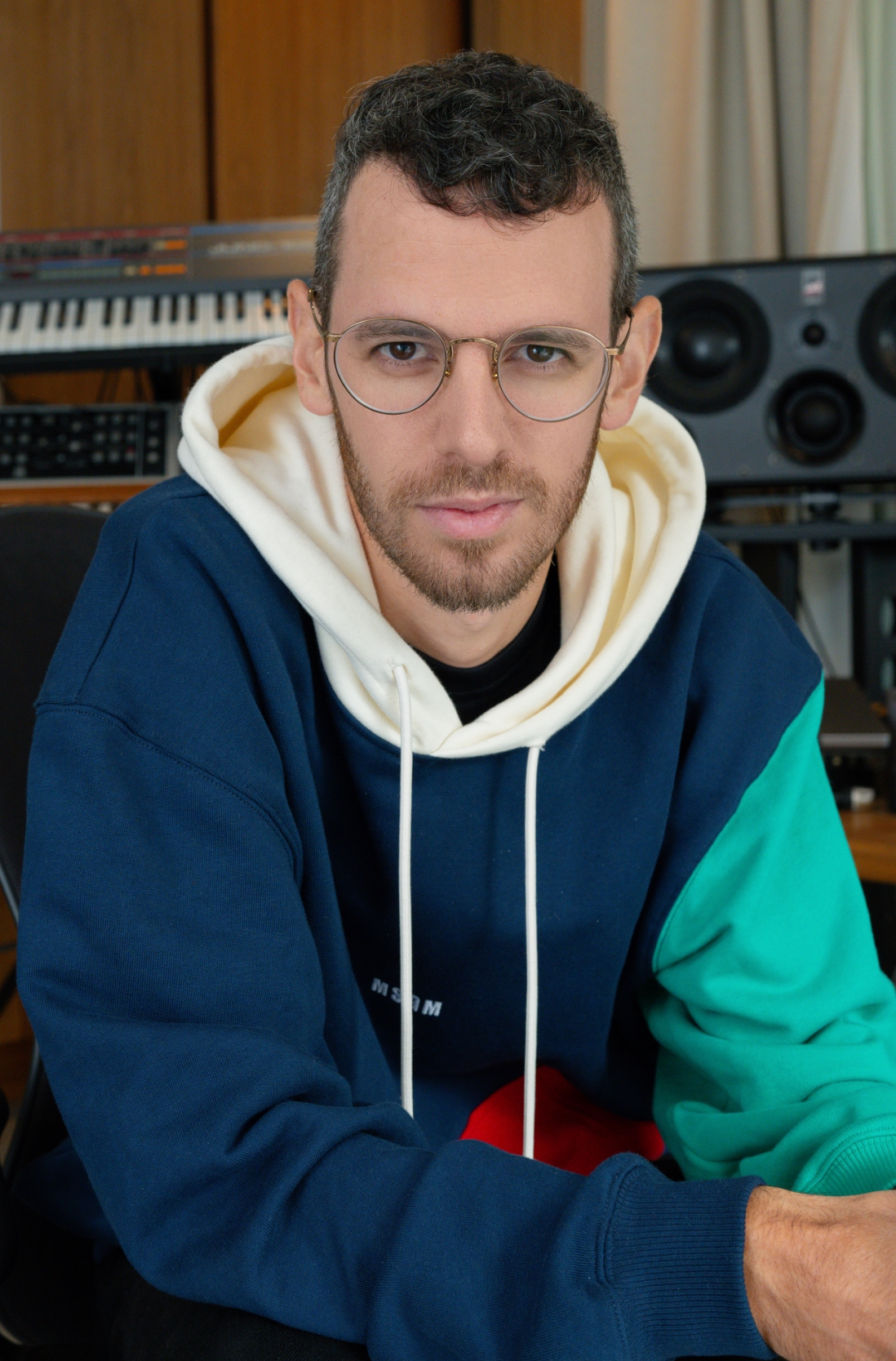

Background information
- Born: Yonatan Goldstein; January 29, 1991 (age 35)
- Origin: Motza Illit, Israel
- Genres: Pop; dance; hip hop; reggaeton; K-pop
- Occupations: Record producer; songwriter
- Instruments: Keyboards; drums; vocals
- Years active: 2004–present
- Website: johnnygoldstein.com

Yonatan "Johnny" Goldstein (Hebrew: יונתן "ג'וני" גולדשטיין; born January 29, 1991) is an Israeli record producer and songwriter.

== Career ==
Goldstein, born in Israel to Yosef and Ora Goldstein, was interested in music from a very young age. He began playing drums at age nine and started writing and singing at 11. He was a member of a rock band in high school.

Using the nickname "Little Johnny" (ג'וני הקטן, Johnny haKatan in Hebrew), he recorded a song with the band Hadag Nahash. After sending a six-song demo to David Klemes (keyboard player for Hadag Nahash), they decided to work on one of the demos as the basis for an album by Goldstein. The project, to be called "My Neighborhood" (השכונה שלי, haSkhuna Sheli), never materialized. In addition to the album project and his school load, Goldstein worked with an assortment of artists and musicians, including Avishai Cohen (bassist), Dana Adini, Ania Bukstein, Sagol 59, and Corinne Allal. In 2008, he released his debut album, The Johnny Show, through Helicon Records. It featured 14 tracks and a number of collaborators, including Muki, Hadag Nahash, Rami Fortis, Useless ID, Shlomi Shaban, Avishai Cohen (bassist), Adi Ulmansky, Sha'anan Street, Cohen@Mushon, and Kutiman

After graduating from Thelma Yellin High School of Arts, Goldstein collaborated with Israeli pop star Ivri Lider to form the vocalist duo TYP. Their debut album, 09:00 to 17:00, 17:00 to Whenever, was released in Israel in 2011 and was greeted with critical and commercial success. TYP was named "Best Israeli Act" at the 2011 MTV Europe Music Awards. Soon after, the group signed with Universal Music Group/Polydor for international distribution, and also signed with events promoter Live Nation Entertainment.

In 2015, Goldstein was selected to be the musical director and music producer for the reboot of the globally successful musical Hair. The production received rave reviews and went on to become the most viewed play of the year, with more than 250 showings. Goldstein then went on to serve as lead music producer and guest judge on The X Factor Israel for both the first and second seasons. He was also a judge on the successful teen oriented show, Band Project.

In 2016, as part of TYP, Goldstein released their final collaboration album together, Remixes and Covers, which includes official remixes for Lana Del Rey, Tove Lo, Moby, Imagine Dragons, and Zedd.

In 2019, Goldstein began working alongside rapper and record producer will.i.am on the Black Eyed Peas' eighth studio album Translation, with features including Shakira, Tyga, Ozuna, Nicky Jam, Becky G, Maluma, French Montana, El Alfa, Piso 21, and J Rey Soul. producing a total of twelve of fifteen tracks which made its debut at #3 on top Billboard's Latin Albums Chart. Goldstein's first global hit record was his co-production on the Black Eyed Peas' lead single MAMACITA featuring Ozuna and J Rey Soul, which samples Madonna's Latin pop song "La Isla Bonita" (1986).

In 2023 Goldstein executive produced Coi Leray’s album "COI", which includes the Billboard Hot 100 Top 10 hit song “Players” (#1 Billboard Hot Rap Song).

in 2024, Goldstein wrote and produced "Tell Ur Girlfriend" by Lay Bankz, the song peaked at #26 on Spotify's global chart and was #1 on the TikTok Billboard chart for 3 weeks.

== Charts ==
=== charts ===
Chart	Peak position
Billboard Hot 100 Producers	6
Billboard Rap Producers	1
Billboard R&B/Hip-Hop Producers	4
Billboard Dance/Electronic Producers	6
Billboard Latin Producers	9

== Discography ==
=== Production credits ===
Year	Artist	Song(s)	Album	Label	Writer	Producer	Mixer
2026	Lisa	Cobra	Press Play	LLOUD & RCA Records	check	check	
2026	Lisa	Cut U Off	Press Play	LLOUD & RCA Records	check	check	
2026	&Team	Good Boy	Mark on Me	YX Labels	check	check	
2026	Katseye	That Way	Wild	Hybe UMG & Geffen	check	check	
2026	Bebe Rexha	One Day	Dirty Blonde	Empire Distribution	check	check	
2026	Santos Bravos	0%	Dual	Hybe Latin America	check	check	
2026	Santos Bravos	Wow	Dual	Hybe Latin America	check	check	
2026	Santos Bravos	Mhm	Dual	Hybe Latin America	check	check	
2026	Santos Bravos	Kawasaki	Dual	Hybe Latin America	check	check	
2026	Santos Bravos	Velocidade	Dual	Hybe Latin America	check	check	
2026	Santos Bravos	Fe	Dual	Hybe Latin America	check	check	
2025	Ava Max	Take My Call	Don't Click Play	Atlantic Records	check	check	
2025	Cortis	Go!	Color Outside the Lines	Big Hit Music	check	check	
2025	Sean Paul	Ginger	N/A		check	check	
2025	J-Hope & Miguel	Sweet Dreams	N/A	Big Hit Music	check	check	
2025	Sean Paul & Inna	Let It Talk To Me	N/A		check	check	
2025	Coi Leray	U Too	N/A	Epic Records	check	check	
2025	NLE Choppa & Imagine Dragons	Dare U	N/A	Warner Records	check	check	
2024	Coi Leray	Heart Don’t Lie	N/A	Trendsetter	check	check	check
2024	Illit & Ava Max	Baby It’s Both (Tick Tack English version)	N/A	Belift Lab	check	check	
2024	Enhypen	No Doubt	Romance: Untold -Daydream-	Belift Lab	check	check	
2024	Enhypen	Daydream	Romance: Untold -Daydream-	Belift Lab	check	check	
2024	Tomorrow X Together	Heaven	The Star Chapter: Sanctuary	Big Hit Music	check	check	
2024	Tomorrow X Together	Danger	The Star Chapter: Sanctuary	Big Hit Music	check	check	
2024	Illit	Tick-Tack	I'll Like You	Belift Lab	check	check	
2024	Jae Stephens	Body Favors	Sellout	Def Jam Records	check	check	
2024	XG	Something Ain't Right	N/A	XGALX	check	check	
2024	Ohthatsmizz	Like	N/A	Plush Records	check	check	check
2024	Tha Dogg Pound & will.i.am	LA Kind of Love (Remix)	W.A.W.G. (We All We Got) (Deluxe Edition)	Death Row Records		check	
2024	Hailey Knox	On Nothing	For The Best	10k Records	check	check	
2024	Flo Milli	Duh!	Bad Boys: Ride Or Die Soundtrack	Epic Records	check	check	
2024	Lay Bankz	Double It	After 7	Artist Partner Group	check	check	
2024	Lay Bankz	Would You?	After 7	Artist Partner Group	check	check	
2024	Stray Kids & Charlie Puth	Lose My Breath	N/A	JYP Entertainment	check	check	
2024	Black Eyed Peas, Becky G, El Alfa	Tonight (Bad Boys: Ride Or Die)	Bad Boys: Ride Or Die Soundtrack	Epic Records	check	check	
2024	Alec Benjamin	In A Little	12 Notes	Elektra Records	check	check	
2024	Aitch	Famous Girl	N/A	NQrecords	check	check	
2024	J Rey Soul, will.i.am & DJ Youcef	It’s Saturday	N/A	Polydor	check	check	
2024	Flo Milli	Tell Me What You Want	Fine Ho, Stay	RCA Records	check	check	
2024	Jason Derulo & David Guetta	Down	Nu King	Atlantic Records	check	check	
2024	Jason Derulo	So Many Hearts	Nu King	Atlantic Records	check	check	
2024	Lay Bankz	Tell Ur Girlfriend	After 7	Artist Partner Group	check	check	
2024	J. Rey Soul	Holla	N/A	Epic Records	check	check	
2023	Ozuna & David Guetta	Vocation	Cosmo	Sony Music Entertainment	check	check	
2023	David Guetta, Lil Durk & Ayra Starr	Big FU	N/A	Atlantic Records	check	check	
2023	Baby Tate	Luv Everybody	Baby Tate Presents - Sexploration: The Musical	Warner Records	check	check	
2023	will.i.am & J Balvin	LET’S GO	N/A	Epic Records	check	check	
2023	Thirty Seconds to Mars	Seasons	It's the End of the World but It's a Beautiful Day	Concord Records	check	check	
2023	will.i.am & Britney Spears	MIND YOUR BUSINESS	N/A	Epic Records	check	check	
2023	Coi Leray	Bitch Girl	COI	Republic Records	check	check	
2023	Coi Leray & David Guetta	Make My Day	COI	Republic Records	check	check	
2023	Coi Leray	Get Loud	COI	Republic Records	check	check	
2023	Coi Leray	Phuck It	COI	Republic Records	check	check	
2023	Coi Leray & Saucy Santana	Spend It	COI	Republic Records	check	check	
2023	Coi Leray	On My Way	COI	Republic Records	check	check	
2023	Coi Leray & James Brown	Man's World	COI	Republic Records	check	check	
2023	Coi Leray	Black Rose	COI	Republic Records	check	check	
2023	Coi Leray & Skillibeng	Radioactive	COI	Republic Records	check	check	
2023	Coi Leray	Come and Go	COI	Republic Records	check	check	
2023	Coi Leray	Run It Up	COI	Republic Records	check	check	
2023	Riton David Guetta feat. Jozzy	Where You Want	N/A	Atlantic Records	check	check	
2023	Jason Derulo feat. Dido	When Love Sucks	N/A	Atlantic Records	check		
2023	Justin Quiles, Dalex & Santa Fe Klan	Sigue La Fiesta	Fast X	Artist Partner Group	check	check	
2023	Bailey Zimmerman, Dermot Kennedy & YoungBoy Never Broke Again	Won't Back Down	Fast X	Artist Partner Group	check	check	
2023	will.i.am & Lil Wayne	THE FURMULA	N/A	Epic Records	check	check	
2023	Coi Leray	My Body	COI	Republic Records	check	check	
2023	Coi Leray	Bops	COI	Republic Records	check	check	
2023	David Guetta, Anne-Marie & Coi Leray	Baby Don't Hurt Me	N/A	Warner Music Group		check	
2023	Coi Leray & Tokischa	Players (Tokischa Remix)	N/A	Republic Records	check	check	
2023	Coi Leray & Busta Rhymes	Players with Busta Rhymes (DJ Saige Remix)	N/A	Republic Records	check	check	
2023	Coi Leray & David Guetta	Players (David Guetta Remix)	N/A	Republic Records	check	check	
2023	Ava Max	Hold Up (Wait A Minute)	Diamonds & Dancefloors	Atlantic Records	check	check	
2022	Coi Leray	Players	COI	Republic Records	check	check	
2022	Black Eyed Peas & Daddy Yankee	BAILAR CONTIGO	ELEVATION	Epic Records	check	check	
2022	Black Eyed Peas & Nicky Jam	GET DOWN	ELEVATION	Epic Records	check	check	
2022	Black Eyed Peas & Ozuna	L.O.V.E	ELEVATION	Epic Records	check	check	
2022	Black Eyed Peas & J. Rey Soul	DOUBLE D'Z	ELEVATION	Epic Records	check	check	
2022	Black Eyed Peas & J. Rey Soul	FILIPINA QUEEN	ELEVATION	Epic Records	check	check	
2022	Black Eyed Peas	AUDIOS	ELEVATION	Epic Records	check	check	
2022	Black Eyed Peas	JUMP	ELEVATION	Epic Records	check	check	
2022	Black Eyed Peas	FIRE STARTER	ELEVATION	Epic Records	check	check	
2022	Black Eyed Peas	GUARANTEE	ELEVATION	Epic Records	check	check	
2022	Riton (musician), Major League DJz & King Promise	Chale	N/A	Atlantic Records	check	check	
2022	Alan Walker & Trevor Daniel (singer)	Extremes	N/A	Sony Music	check	check	
2022	Sorana	Happy Birthday Sadness	N/A	Atlantic Records	check	check	
2022	Black Eyed Peas, Farruko, Shakira & David Guetta	DON'T YOU WORRY (Farruko REMIX)	N/A	Epic Records	check	check	
2022	Saucy Santana	I'm Too Much	N/A	RCA Records	check	check	
2022	Madonna & Saucy Santana	MATERIAL GWORRLLLLLLLL!	N/A	Warner Records	check	check	
2022	Beyoncé	BREAK MY SOUL (will.i.am Remix)	BREAK MY SOUL REMIXES	Columbia Records		check	
2022	Latto	Pussy	N/A	RCA Records	check	check	
2022	Flo Rida	What A Night	N/A	Artist Partner Group	check	check	
2022	Black Eyed Peas, Shakira & David Guetta	DON'T YOU WORRY	N/A	Epic Records	check	check	
2022	Saucy Santana & Latto	Booty	N/A	RCA Records	check	check	
2022	Faouzia	SoLie	CITIZENS	Atlantic Records	check	check	
2022	Jauz & Johnny GOLD	PPL	N/A	Big Beat Records (American record label)	check	check	
2022	Louis the Child (DJs) & Aluna	Cry	N/A	Interscope Records	check	check	
2022	Kiki el Crazy & will.i.am	Latina	Llego el Domi		check	check	
2022	Jennifer Lopez	Love Of My Life	Marry Me (Original Motion Picture Soundtrack)	Sony Music Latin		check	
2022	NLE Choppa	Lick Me Baby	Me vs Me	Warner Records	check	check	
2021	Flo Rida	Wait	N/A	Artist Partner Group	check	check	
2021	Faouzia	Puppet	CITIZENS	Atlantic Records	check	check	
2021	J Rey Soul & Will.i.am ft Nile Rodgers	PULL UP	N/A	Epic Records	check	check	
2021	Black Eyed Peas ft Saweetie & Lele Pons	HIT IT	N/A	Epic Records	check	check	
2021	Saweetie ft Kash Doll & Salt-N-Pepa	Hoops	Space Jam: A New Legacy	Republic Records	check	check	
2021	Jennifer Hudson	Here I am (Singing My Way Home)	From the motion picture Soundtrack Respect	Epic Records		check	
2021	Galantis, David Guetta & Little Mix	Heartbreak Anthem	N/A	Atlantic Records / Big Beat Records (American record label)	check	check	
2021	Major Lazer ft Sia & Labrinth	Titans	Music Is the Weapon (Reloaded)	Mad Decent	check	check	
2021	Jennifer Hudson	Ain't No Mountain High Enough	N/A	Epic Records		check	
2021	will.i.am	American Dream	N/A	Will.i.am Music Group	check	check	
2021	Killboy	U + Me	N/A	Atlantic Records / Artist Partner Group	check	check	
2020	Faouzia & John Legend	Minefields	CITIZENS	Atlantic Records / Artist Partner Group	check	check	
2020	Static & Ben El Tavori & Black Eyed Peas	Shake Ya Boom Boom	N/A	Saban Music Group	check	check	
2020	Hadag Nahash	Bomba	N/A	Hed Arzi	check	check	
2020	Black Eyed Peas & Maluma	FEEL THE BEAT	TRANSLATION	BEP / Epic Records	check	check	
2020	Black Eyed Peas (with Ozuna & J. Rey Soul)	MAMACITA	TRANSLATION	BEP / Epic Records	check	check	
2020	Black Eyed Peas & Shakira	GIRL LIKE ME	TRANSLATION	BEP / Epic Records	check	check	
2020	Black Eyed Peas with Nicky Jam & Tyga	VIDA LOCA	TRANSLATION	BEP / Epic Records		check	
2020	Black Eyed Peas & El Alfa	NO MAÑANA	TRANSLATION	BEP / Epic Records	check	check	
2020	Black Eyed Peas & J. Rey Soul	TONTA LOVE	TRANSLATION	BEP / Epic Records	check	check	
2020	Black Eyed Peas	CELEBRATE	TRANSLATION	BEP / Epic Records	check	check	
2020	Black Eyed Peas & Piso 21	TODO BUENO	TRANSLATION	BEP / Epic Records	check	check	
2020	Black Eyed Peas & Becky G	DURO HARD	TRANSLATION	BEP / Epic Records	check	check	
2020	Black Eyed Peas & French Montana	MABUTI	TRANSLATION	BEP / Epic Records	check	check	
2020	Black Eyed Peas	GET LOOSE NOW	TRANSLATION	BEP / Epic Records	check	check	
2020	Black Eyed Peas	NEWS TODAY	TRANSLATION	BEP / Epic Records	check	check	
2020	Iza & Maejor	Let Me Be The One	N/A	Warner Music Group	check	check	check
2020	Maejor	RIP (432 Hz)	Vol 1: Frequency	Island Records	check	check	check
2020	Killboy	666	N/A	Atlantic Records	check	check	check
2020	Killboy	THAT'S OK I'LL JUST F*** MYSELF	N/A	Atlantic Records	check	check	check
2020	Ella Lee Lahav	Zot Ani	N/A	Tedy Productions	check	check	check
2020	Mergui	Lo yotze lemesibot	N/A	Gaga Booking LTD	check	check	check
2020	Eliana Tidhar	Mema'ker	Producer, writer, Mixed	NMC Music	check	check	check
2020	Stephane Legar	Look what you did	N/A	Unicell	check	check	check
2019	Mergui & Stephane Legar	Dibor Nagua	N/A	Gaga Booking LTD	check	check	check
2019	Stephane Legar	MAPIOT	N/A	Unicell	check	check	check
2019	Keren Peles	Mi Ani	N/A	NMC Music	check	check	check
2019	Mergui	Ma Iyea Plus 1 Madagaskar Hakol Shakoff Asur Ze Hasof Shelanu	Ma Iyea	Gaga Booking LTD	check	check	check
2019	Nathan Goshen	Mitgaagaat	Bati Lachlom	Tedy Productions	check	check	check
2019	Anna Zak	Call It Out	N/A	NMC Music	check	check	check
2019	Mooki & Berry Sakharof	Min Azvut Shekazot	N/A	Helicon	check	check	check
2019	Mergui	Ani Lo Ani	N/A	Gaga Booking LTD	check	check	check
2018	Richard Orlinski ft Anna Zak, Fat Joe	Gravity	N/A	OR / Jo& Co	check	check	check
2018	Sofiane	Sa Mére	Affranchis	Suther Kane	check	check	check
2018	Anna Zak	Bang Bang	N/A	NMC Music	check	check	check
2018	Mergui	Tni Li Rega	N/A	Gaga Booking LTD	check	check	check
2018	Eden Alene	Better	N/A	Aroma Music	check	check	check
2018	Marina Maximilian Blumin	Glow Now	N/A	Tedy Productions	check	check	check
2017	Avishai Cohen	Motherless Child Blinded	1970	Sony Music	check	check	
2017	Lola Marsh	Remember Roses Bluebird Morning Bells Hometown	Remember Roses	Barclay	check	check	check
2017	Anna Zak	My Love	N/A	NMC Music	check	check	check
2017	Anna Zak	Money Homey	N/A	NMC Music	check	check	check
2016	Dudu Aharon	Sam Tabaat Aleha	N/A	NMC Music	check	check	check
2016	Adi Ulmansky ft. Curtis Williams	Higher	N/A	RED Music	check	check	check
2014	Shy'm	L'effet de Serre Cape Town De Toi	Solitaire	Warner Music France	check	check	check
