= Tick-Tack =

2024 song by Illit

Song by Illit

from the EP I'll Like You
- Language: Korean
- Released: October 21, 2024
- Genre: Chiptune; pop; electronic
- Length: 2:09
- Label: Belift Lab
- Songwriters: Johnny Goldstein; Sam Martin; "Hitman" Bang; Divahh; Slow Rabbit; Shin Kung; Tatte; January 8th (Jam Factory); Jude; Na Do-yeon (153/Joombas); Choi Me-i (153/Joombas); Kim Soo-ji (Lalala Studio); Moon Ji-young (Lalala Studio)
- Producers: Johnny Goldstein; "Hitman" Bang; Divahh; Slow Rabbit; Shin Kung

Music video
- "Tick-Tack" on YouTube

"Tick-Tack" is a song recorded by South Korean girl group Illit for their second extended play I'll Like You. It was released by Belift Lab on October 21, 2024, as the fifth and final track of the EP. NME described the song as "an unapologetic chiptune-heavy fare".

== Background ==
On September 23, 2024, Belift Lab announced that Illit would be releasing their second EP titled I'll Like You on October 21. On October 7, the track listing was released, revealing the track "Tick-Tack". The song was released together with the EP on October 21.

== Music video ==
On November 13, 2024, a teaser for the music video for "Tick-Tack" was released. The music video was then released a day later on November 14. The video features a new choreography for the song that expresses a girl's desire to look mature and cool in front of her crush, while having a hidden soft spot for cute and adorable things.

== Promotion ==
Illit performed "Tick-Tack" on three music programs in the first week of promotion: KBS's Music Bank on November 15, MBC's Show! Music Core on November 16, and SBS's Inkigayo on November 17.

== Credits and personnel ==
- Illit – vocals
- Johnny Goldstein – songwriter, producer
- Sam Martin – songwriter
- "Hitman" Bang – songwriter, producer
- Divahh – songwriter, producer
- Slow Rabbit – songwriter, producer
- Shin Kung – songwriter, producer
- Tatte – songwriter
- January 8 (Jam Factory) – songwriter
- Jude – songwriter
- Na Do-yeon (153/Joombas) – songwriter
- Choi Me-i (153/Joombas) – songwriter
- Kim Soo-ji (Lalala Studio) – songwriter
- Moon Ji-young (Lalala Studio) – songwriter

== English version ("Baby It's Both") ==
"Baby It's Both"

Single by Illit featuring Ava Max
- Language: English
- Released: November 22, 2024
- Genre: Pop
- Length: 3:13
- Label: Belift Lab
- Songwriters: Ava Max; Johnny Goldstein; Sam Martin; Nija; Cate Downey; Maya K; Lauren Mandel
- Producer: Johnny Goldstein

Illit singles chronology
"Cherish (My Love)" (2024)	"Baby It's Both" (2024)	"Almond Chocolate" (2025)

Ava Max singles chronology
"1 Wish" (2024)	"Baby It's Both" (2024)	"Lost Your Faith" (2025)

On November 22, 2024, Belift Lab announced that Illit would be releasing an English version of "Tick-Tack", titled "Baby It's Both", featuring American singer Ava Max. "Baby It's Both" was released on the same day.

=== Credits and personnel ===
- Illit – vocals
- Ava Max – featured vocals, songwriter
- Johnny Goldstein – songwriter, producer
- Sam Martin – songwriter
- Nija – songwriter
- Cate Downey – songwriter
- Maya K – songwriter
- Lauren Mandel – songwriter

== Charts ==
=== Weekly charts ===
Weekly chart performance for "Tick-Tack"
Chart (2024)	Peak position
Japan Download Songs (Billboard Japan)	99
Singapore Regional (RIAS)	22
South Korea (Circle)	140

=== Monthly charts ===
Monthly chart performance for "Tick-Tack"
Chart (2024)	Position
South Korea (Circle)	165
