= Translation (album) =

Studio album by Black Eyed Peas
- Released: June 19, 2020
- Genre: Hip-hop; pop; dance; reggaeton; Latin; trap; Afrobeats
- Length: 56:30
- Language: Spanish; English; Tagalog
- Label: BEP Music; Epic
- Producer: DJ Snake; Johnny Goldstein; Rvssian; Keith Harris; DJ Ammo; Papatinho; Mucky; Shakira; will.i.am

Black Eyed Peas chronology
Masters of the Sun Vol. 1 (2018)	Translation (2020)	Elevation (2022)

Singles from Translation
- 1. "Ritmo" Released: October 11, 2019; 2. "Mamacita" Released: April 10, 2020; 3. "No Mañana" Released: June 13, 2020; 4. "Feel the Beat" Released: June 19, 2020; 5. "Action" Released: August 7, 2020; 6. "Vida Loca" Released: August 21, 2020; 7. "Girl Like Me" Released: December 4, 2020

Translation is the eighth studio album by American group Black Eyed Peas. It was released on June 19, 2020, by Epic Records. The album features guest appearances from Shakira, J Balvin, Ozuna, Maluma, Nicky Jam, Tyga, El Alfa, Piso 21, Becky G, and French Montana.

The track listing was revealed on June 11, 2020, alongside the album announcement. "No Mañana" was released as a promotional single on June 12, 2020, along with the album's cover art. The album was also promoted with two Hot Latin Songs chart toppers, "Ritmo (Bad Boys for Life)" and "Mamacita".

== Commercial performance ==
The album sold 15,000 album-equivalent units, measured largely from streaming revenue – 14 million streams of album tracks through on-demand services, measured as 10,000 streaming equivalent albums – while 4,000 units were traditional album sales. The performance earned the album a chart debut at number 52 on the Billboard 200 and at number three on the Top Latin Albums, which was the group's first top-five appearance on the latter chart. The album is their first to enter the Billboard 200 chart since The Beginning (2010).

== Critical reception ==
Professional ratings
Aggregate scores
Source	Rating
Metacritic	63/100
Review scores
Source	Rating
AllMusic	3.5/5 stars
Belfast Telegraph	6/10
laut.de	1/5 stars
Rolling Stone	2.5/5 stars
Tom Hull – on the Web	B+

Translation was met with generally favorable reviews. At Metacritic, which assigns a normalized rating out of 100 to reviews from professional critics, the album received a weighted average score of 63, based on four reviews.

Reviewing in June 2020 for Rolling Stone, Gary Suarez said the "often clunky" album shows the group exploiting the contemporary Latin pop trend, albeit with occasional charm. In Variety, A. D. Amorosi believed songs such as "I Woke Up" and "Get Loose Now" sound as if they were focus grouped for Latin audiences, but said of the album overall, "BEP have found a new sense of adventure, inventiveness and contagion through the modern Latin music prism." Ingrid Angulo from Hot Press was more impressed, applauding their foray into reggaeton and saying, "The collaborations are seamless and the tracks as catchy as ever, cementing the modern global success of Latin-inspired dance music." Tom Hull was also relatively positive, writing in his blog, "Seems like they had a perfectly functional hip-hop/funk album on tap for summer release, then wound up adding a most atypical and remarkable topical song, 'News Today'."

== Track listing ==
Translation track listing
No.	Title	Writer(s)	Producer(s)	Length
1.	"Ritmo (Bad Boys For Life)" (with J Balvin)	William Adams; Allan Pineda; Keith Harris; José Álvaro Osorio Balvin; Francesco Bontempi; Michale Gaffey; Peter Glenister; Annerley Gordon; Giorgio Spagner	will.i.am; Harris^{[a]}	3:34
2.	"Feel the Beat" (with Maluma)	Adams; Yonatan Goldstein; Pineda; Jimmy Luis Gomez; Juan Luis Londoño Arias; Hugh L Clarke; Paul Anthony Thomas; Curtis T. Bedeau; Gerard R. Charles; Brian P. George; Lucien J. George	will.i.am; Johnny Goldstein^{[a]}; Mucky^{[a]}	3:57
3.	"Mamacita" (with Ozuna)	Adams; Goldstein; Juan Carlos Ozuna Rosado; Pineda; J. Gomez; Madonna Ciccone; Bruce Gaitsch; Susan Leonard; Patrick Leonard	will.i.am; Goldstein^{[a]}	4:11
4.	"Girl Like Me" (with Shakira)	Adams; Pineda; J. Gomez; Shakira; Goldstein; Brendan Buckley; Albert Menendez; Tim Mitchell	will.i.am; Shakira^{[a]}; Goldstein^{[a]}	3:42
5.	"Vida Loca" (with Nicky Jam and Tyga)	Adams; Pineda; J. Gomez; Micheal Ray Stevenson; Nick Rivera Caminero; James Johnson; Alonzo Miller; Kirk Burrell	will.i.am	3:54
6.	"No Mañana" (with El Alfa)	Adams; Pineda; J. Gomez; Emmanuel Herrera Batista	will.i.am; Goldstein^{[a]}	3:39
7.	"Tonta Love"	Adams; Goldstein	Goldstein; will.i.am^{[a]}	3:50
8.	"Celebrate"	Adams; Goldstein; Pineda; J. Gomez	Goldstein; will.i.am^{[a]}	3:39
9.	"Todo Bueno" (with Piso 21)	Adams; Goldstein; Pineda; J. Gomez; David Escobar Gallego; Pablo Mejia Bermudez; Juan David Huertas Clavijo; David Lorduy Hernández; Alejandro Patiño	Goldstein; will.i.am^{[a]}; Mosty^{[b]}	3:50
10.	"Duro Hard" (with Becky G)	Adams; Reynard Bargmann; Rebbeca Marie Gomez; J. Gomez; Goldstein; Damien Leroy; Papatinho	will.i.am; Mucky^{[a]}; DJ Ammo^{[a]}; Goldstein^{[a]}; Papatinho^{[a]}	3:25
11.	"Mabuti" (with French Montana)	Adams; Goldstein; Pineda; Karim Kharbouch; Simon Carter; Walter Carter; David Ferguson; William Hull; Curtis Reynolds; Keith Samuels; Brian Sherrer	Goldstein; will.i.am^{[a]}	4:16
12.	"I Woke Up"	Adams; Pineda; J. Gomez; Tarik Johnston	Rvssian	3:30
13.	"Get Loose Now"	Adams; Goldstein	will.i.am; Goldstein^{[a]}	2:27
14.	"Action"	Adams; Pineda; J. Gomez; William Grigahcine	DJ Snake	4:12
15.	"News Today"	Adams; Goldstein; Pineda; J. Gomez; Benjamin Mor	Goldstein	4:16
Total length:				56:24

Target and Japanese bonus tracks
No.	Title	Writer(s)	Producer(s)	Length
16.	"Ritmo Remix" (with J Balvin and Jaden)	Adams; Pineda; Harris; Balvin; Bontempi; Gaffey; Glenister; Gordon; Spagner	will.i.am; Harris^{[a]}	3:49
17.	"Ritmo Remix" (with Steve Aoki and J Balvin)	Adams; Pineda; Harris; Balvin; Bontempi; Gaffey; Glenister; Gordon; Spagner	will.i.am; Harris^{[a]}	3:52
Total length:				64:05

=== Notes ===
- ^{^a} signifies a co-producer
- ^{^b} signifies an additional producer
- "Ritmo" is listed as "Ritmo (Bad Boys for Life)" on digital versions of the album.
- All tracks are stylized in all caps on streaming services, for example, "Mamacita" is stylized as "MAMACITA".
- "Ritmo" contains a sample of "The Rhythm of the Night" by Corona.
- "Feel the Beat" contains a sample of "Can You Feel the Beat" by Lisa Lisa and Cult Jam.
- "Mamacita" contains a sample of "La Isla Bonita" by Madonna.
- "Vida Loca" contains interpolations of "Super Freak" by Rick James and "U Can't Touch This" by MC Hammer.
- "Celebrate" contains a sample of "Conga" by the Miami Sound Machine.
- "Mabuti" contains a sample of "I Don't Know What It Is, But It Sure Is Funky" by Ripple.

== Personnel ==
=== Black Eyed Peas ===
- will.i.am – vocals on all tracks except 7, piano, keyboards, drum programming, programming
- apl.de.ap – vocals on all tracks except 7, 10, 13, and 16 (Japanese edition)
- Taboo – vocals on all tracks except 1, 7, 11, 13, 16, and 17 (Japanese edition)
- J. Rey Soul – vocals on tracks 3, 5, 7–8, and 11–12

== Charts ==
=== Weekly charts ===
Weekly chart performance for Translation
Chart (2020)	Peak position
Austrian Albums (Ö3 Austria)	45
Belgian Albums (Ultratop Flanders)	43
Belgian Albums (Ultratop Wallonia)	37
Canadian Albums (Billboard)	8
Dutch Albums (Album Top 100)	18
Finnish Albums (Suomen virallinen lista)	13
French Albums (SNEP)	13
German Albums (Offizielle Top 100)	57
Italian Albums (FIMI)	8
Japan Hot Albums (Billboard Japan)	71
Japanese Albums (Oricon)	62
Norwegian Albums (VG-lista)	38
Portuguese Albums (AFP)	33
Scottish Albums (OCC)	97
Swedish Albums (Sverigetopplistan)	42
Swiss Albums (Schweizer Hitparade)	11
US Billboard 200	52
US Top Latin Albums (Billboard)	3

=== Year-end charts ===
2020 year-end chart performance for Translation
Chart (2020)	Position
French Albums (SNEP)	99
Italian Albums (FIMI)	78
US Top Latin Albums (Billboard)	23

2021 year-end chart performance for Translation
Chart (2021)	Position
French Albums (SNEP)	96
US Top Latin Albums (Billboard)	19

== Certifications ==
Certifications for Translation
Region	Certification	Certified units/sales
France (SNEP)	Platinum	100,000^{‡}
Italy (FIMI)	Platinum	50,000^{‡}
Poland (ZPAV)	Platinum	20,000^{‡}
^{‡} Sales+streaming figures based on certification alone.
