= Girl Like Me (Black Eyed Peas and Shakira song) =

2020 single by Black Eyed Peas and Shakira

Single by Black Eyed Peas and Shakira

from the album Translation
- Language: English; Spanish
- Released: December 4, 2020
- Recorded: October 2008–January 2020
- Studio: Future Labs (Los Angeles)
- Genre: R&B; dance
- Length: 3:43
- Label: Epic
- Songwriters: William Adams; Allan Pineda; Jimmy Luis Gomez; Shakira Mebarak; Brendan Buckley; Johnny Goldstein; Albert Menendez; Tim Mitchell
- Producers: will.i.am; Shakira; Johnny Goldstein

Black Eyed Peas singles chronology
"Shake Ya Boom Boom" (2020)	"Girl Like Me" (2020)	"Hit It" (2021)

Shakira singles chronology
"Me Gusta" (2020)	"Girl Like Me" (2020)	"Don't Wait Up" (2021)

Music video
- "Girl Like Me" on YouTube

"Girl Like Me" (stylized in all caps) is a song by American group Black Eyed Peas and Colombian singer Shakira. Originally conceived in 2008 and later considered for will.i.am's fourth studio album #willpower (2013), the song was released on the Black Eyed Peas' eighth studio album, Translation (2020). It was released on December 4, 2020, alongside a Rich Lee-directed music video. The track was written by the Black Eyed Peas, Shakira, Brendan Buckley, Johnny Goldstein, Albert Menendez, and Tim Mitchell and was produced by the group's member will.i.am, Shakira, and Johnny Goldstein. The song was praised for its "anthemic" nature and Shakira's vocals were compared to those she used in her eighth studio album She Wolf (2009). Commercially, the single reached the top ten in twelve countries, notably in Latin America's countries, including Venezuela and Perù, and some Western European nations, including France and Belgium. It is certified Diamond in Brazil, France and Mexico and Platinum or higher in seven additional countries, including Poland and Italy.

== Background and release ==
"Girl Like Me" was written by will.i.am, apl.de.ap, Taboo, Shakira, Brendan Buckley, Johnny Goldstein, Albert Menendez, and Tim Mitchell, while being produced by will.i.am and co-pruduced by Shakira and Johnny Goldstein. will.i.am started working on the song with Shakira in October 2008. Will.i.am tried to re-work the song for his fourth studio album #willpower in 2010, but the track again failed to be included.

In January 2020, on a video studio session with Johny Goldstein, the song began to get a new shape with the "right combination of sonics and rhythm". Will.i.am in an interview with NME said that he "refreshed it, and called Shakira, and we wrote new lyrics and she helped me with my Spanish." In ETOnline he complimented Shakira by saying "she comes with notes, and it's awesome. But she does it in a very gentle, humble, sweet way, to where you just wanna please all of her concerns." Shakira commented that "she really loved working with Black Eyed Peas", saying that "Will[.i.am] knows how detail-oriented I am and was so patient and meticulous with me and making sure we had the absolute best sound possible." "Girl like Me" was finally included in Black Eyed Peas' eight studio album Translation (2020).

On June 19, 2020, Black Eyed Peas revealed an alternative cover art for the single, featuring a drawn black silhouette of Shakira in a raspberry rose ellipse and teal background, and on December 3 they showed the same cover but with a white background. The same day both acts announced through their social media that the song's music video would be released on December 4. The song was sent to contemporary hit radio stations in Italy on December 11. On February 26, 2021, the twocolors remix of the song was released.

== Composition and lyrics ==
"Girl Like Me" is a song sung and rapped in English and Spanish. The track was composed in E minor key and tempo of 124 BPM. It starts with the chorus sang in English by Shakira, where she used vocals compared to those from her 2009 studio album She Wolf. The first verse is rapped by will.i.am, where he switches from English to Spanish multiple times throughout the verse. After the second and last chorus, there is a bridge sung by Shakira in Spanish. In his verse, Taboo makes a reference to Shakira's smash hit "Hips Don't Lie" in the line "Your hips don’t lie, they rock me", when apl.de.ap references late Latin singer Selena and Brazilian singer Anitta. The song has been described as "anthemic" or "empowering" by many publications.

== Reception ==
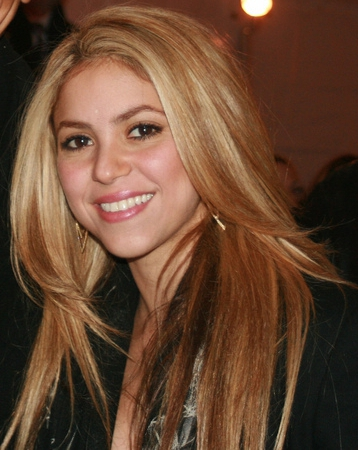
"Girl Like Me" is Shakira's first Hot 100 entry since her 2017 single "Perro Fiel", making her the first Latin artist to have singles charted in 2000s, 2010s and 2020s.

A.D. Amorosi of Variety said in a review for the Black Eyed Peas album Translation, that "Shakira turns an anthemic dance-floor spiel into something weirdly intimate." Mike Wass of Idolator called the song an "addictive bop" and added that "All in all, 'Girl Like Me' sounds like a smash. It’s a summery, feel-good call to the dance floor with a little Latin spice and a radio-friendly chorus." Entertainment Weekly's Et Más called a song "Latina-empowering track".

"Girl Like Me" became an instant viral hit on YouTube, racking up 23 million views in 3 days and 200 million in less than two months. The song also sparked a viral challenge on TikTok where users challenged themselves to recreate the video's choreography. In the United States, the song debuted on Billboard's Digital Songs in December 2020 at number 37. It later debuted on the Hot 100 chart at number 87 on the week ending January 16, 2021. The song ultimately peaked at number 67 in its sixth charting week on February 27, 2021. The song became Shakira's 22nd and Black Eyed Peas' 19th Hot 100 entry. The song topped Billboard's Latin Airplay chart on the week of March 13, 2021. Girl Like Me eventually was certified gold by RIAA for selling over 500,000 units in the country.

The song reached the top 10 in several Latin charts, including Mexico where it peaked at number four and was certified platinum and gold for selling over 210 thousand copies. In Europe, the song reached the top 5 in Belgian region of Wallonia, France, and Romania. In Africa, the song topped the North African Airplay charts.

== Music video ==
The music video for "Girl Like Me" was filmed in September 2020 and was released on December 4, 2020, at 10 AM in Eastern Time Zone. The music video was directed by Rich Lee, who earlier directed music video for "Imma Be Rocking That Body" (2010). While speaking to Billboard about the video, Shakira said: "The song already has that vintage quality to it, so I wanted a video that had the retro futuristic vibe. From the beginning I thought: Jane Fonda. Those '80s workout videos had a really cool aesthetic I wanted to import into this video."

The video features Shakira on a skateboard and with backup dancers doing aerobics. It also features Black Eyed Peas in a set singing the song. Shakira's appearance has been compared to Wonder Woman. The choreography in the video went viral on TikTok where fans attempted to recreate Shakira's dance moves. In just 5 days, TikTok videos using "Girl Like Me" choreography accumulated 40 million views. The music video received 23 million views in its first three days. In January 2021, the music video passed 200 million views on YouTube.

== Live performance ==
Shakira performs an altered bridge in live renditions of the song, incorporating additional lyrics that highlight Latina heritage, including references to various national identities from countries across Central and South America. Shakira performed the song for the first time on Brazilian variety tv show Domingão com Huck on February 9, 2025, and has subsequently incorporated the track into her “Las Mujeres Ya No Lloran World Tour”, where it appears as the second song in the setlist.

== Track listing ==
- Streaming
1. "Girl Like Me" – 3:43
- Digital download and streaming – twocolors remix
1. "Girl Like Me" (twocolors remix) – 3:01
2. "Girl Like Me" (twocolors extended) – 4:11

== Credits and personnel ==
Credits adapted from Tidal and Translation album notes.

Recording and management

- Recorded at Future Labs (Los Angeles, California, United States and United Kingdom)
- Will2Manifest Music/Kobalt/Apl De Ap Publishing LLC/TABMagnetic, Inc./MyMPM Music/Sony/ATV MelodySesame Love Music/Negro Sterling Music/Rev Sheet Music Publishing

Personnel

- Black Eyed Peas:
  - will.i.am – vocals, songwriting, production
  - apl.de.ap – vocals, songwriting
  - Taboo – vocals, songwriting
- Shakira – vocals, backing vocals, songwriting, co-production
- Olgui Chirino – backing vocals
- Brendan Buckley – songwriting
- Albert Menendez – songwriting
- Tim Mitchell – songwriting
- Johnny Goldstein – co-production
- Roger Rodés – engineering
- Dave Clauss – engineering,
- Dylan "3-D" Dresdow – engineering, mixing, mastering

== Charts ==
=== Weekly charts ===
Weekly chart performance for "Girl Like Me"
Chart (2020–2021)	Peak position
Argentina Hot 100 (Billboard)	53
Belgium (Ultratop 50 Flanders)	11
Belgium (Ultratop 50 Wallonia)	3
Bolivia (Monitor Latino)	16
Canada Hot 100 (Billboard)	59
Chile (Monitor Latino)	11
Colombia (Monitor Latino)	16
Colombia (National-Report)	15
Costa Rica (Monitor Latino)	14
Croatia Airplay (HRT)	48
Dominican Republic (SODINPRO)	18
Ecuador (Monitor Latino)	8
El Salvador Anglo (Monitor Latino)	1
France (SNEP)	2
Global 200 (Billboard)	39
Greece International (IFPI)	54
Guatemala (Monitor Latino)	5
Honduras (Monitor Latino)	6
Hungary (Dance Top 40)	3
Hungary (Rádiós Top 40)	8
Hungary (Single Top 40)	11
Ireland (IRMA)	83
Mexico (Billboard Mexican Airplay)	2
Mexico (Monitor Latino)	4
Netherlands (Dutch Top 40)	33
Netherlands (Single Top 100)	32
Nicaragua Anglo (Monitor Latino)	1
Panama (Monitor Latino)	3
Panama (PRODUCE)	37
Paraguay Anglo (Monitor Latino)	4
Perú (Monitor Latino)	2
Perú Digital Top 1000 (UNIMPRO)	30
Portugal (AFP)	59
Puerto Rico (Monitor Latino)	3
Romania (Airplay 100)	3
Russia Airplay (TopHit)	69
Slovakia Airplay (ČNS IFPI)	33
Slovakia Singles Digital (ČNS IFPI)	21
Spain (Promusicae)	79
Switzerland (Schweizer Hitparade)	28
UK Singles Downloads (Official Charts)	67
UK Singles Sales (OCC)	70
Uruguay Anglo (Monitor Latino)	2
US Billboard Hot 100	67
US Latin Airplay (Billboard)	1
US Pop Airplay (Billboard)	24
Venezuela (Monitor Latino)	6

=== Year-end charts ===
2021 year-end chart performance for "Girl like Me"
Chart (2021)	Position
Belgium (Ultratop Wallonia)	12
Bolivia (Monitor Latino)	73
France (SNEP)	23
Global 200 (Billboard)	139
Hungary (Dance Top 40)	23
Hungary (Rádiós Top 40)	42
Hungary (Single Top 40)	76
Perú (Monitor Latino)	6
Portugal (AFP)	177
Switzerland (Schweizer Hitparade)	96
US Latin Airplay (Billboard)	10

2022 year-end chart performance for "Girl like Me"
Chart (2022)	Position
Hungary (Dance Top 40)	91
Perú Anglo (Monitor Latino)	51

== Certifications ==
Certifications and sales for "Girl Like Me"
Region	Certification	Certified units/sales
Belgium (BRMA)	Gold	20,000^{‡}
Brazil (Pro-Música Brasil)	2× Diamond	320,000^{‡}
France (SNEP)	Diamond	333,333^{‡}
Italy (FIMI)	Platinum	100,000^{‡}
Mexico (AMPROFON)	Diamond+3× Platinum+Gold	1,190,000^{‡}
New Zealand (RMNZ)	Gold	15,000^{‡}
Perú	Platinum	
Poland (ZPAV)	Platinum	50,000^{‡}
Portugal (AFP)	Gold	5,000^{‡}
Spain (Promusicae)	Platinum	60,000^{‡}
Switzerland (IFPI Switzerland)	2× Platinum	40,000^{‡}
United Kingdom (BPI)	Silver	200,000^{‡}
United States (RIAA)	Platinum	1,000,000^{‡}
Streaming
Central America (CFC)	Platinum	7,000,000^{†}
^{‡} Sales+streaming figures based on certification alone.^{†} Streaming-only figures based on certification alone.

== Release history ==
Release dates and formats for "Girl Like Me"
Region	Date	Format	Version	Label	Ref.
Various	June 19, 2020 (Note: A promotional release, later marketed as December 4, 2020.)	Streaming	Original	Epic	
Italy	December 11, 2020	Radio airplay	Original	Sony	
United States	January 12, 2021	Contemporary hit radio	Original	Epic	
Various	February 26, 2021	Digital download; streaming	twocolors remix	Epic	

== See also ==
- List of Billboard Hot Latin Songs and Latin Airplay number ones of 2021
