= Ritmo (song) =

2019 single by Black Eyed Peas and J Balvin

"Ritmo (Bad Boys for Life)"

Single by Black Eyed Peas and J Balvin

from the album Bad Boys for Life – The Soundtrack and Translation
- Released: October 11, 2019
- Genre: Hip hop; EDM; reggaeton
- Length: 3:42 (single and soundtrack version); 3:34 (album version)
- Label: Epic
- Songwriters: William Adams; Allan Pineda; José Álvaro Osorio Balvín; Keith Harris; Annerley Gordon; Francesco Bontempi; Giorgio Spagna; Michael Gaffey; Peter Glenister
- Producers: will.i.am; Keith Harris (co.)

Black Eyed Peas singles chronology
"Explosion" (2019)	"Ritmo (Bad Boys for Life)" (2019)	"Mamacita" (2020)

J Balvin singles chronology
"Qué Pena" (2019)	"Ritmo (Bad Boys for Life)" (2019)	"Blanco" (2019)

Music video
- "RITMO (Bad Boys For Life)" on YouTube

"Ritmo" (also known as "Ritmo (Bad Boys for Life)") is a song by American group Black Eyed Peas and Colombian singer J Balvin, released by Epic Records on October 11, 2019, as the first single from the soundtrack of the 2020 film Bad Boys for Life. It is also included on the group's eighth studio album Translation.

== Background and composition ==
The song features a prominent, slowed down sample of the 1993 song "The Rhythm of the Night" by the Italian group Corona (the song is performed by Italian singer Jenny B, the ghost-voice involved in the project).

Jennifer Lopez was originally intended to appear on the remix version, but Jaden Smith, whose father starred in the third film, appeared on the remix instead which was released on the film's soundtrack.

== Live performance ==
The song was performed live at the closing ceremony of the 2019 Southeast Asian Games in the Philippines.

== Critical reception ==
Billboard's writer Jessica Roiz compared "Ritmo" to "The Rhythm of the Night", writing that the first one "fuses hip-hop, EDM, and reggaeton, has Spanish and English verses without interrupting the original chorus from "The Rhythm of the Night"". In a less enthusiastic review, Gary Suarez of Rolling Stone wrote that "the overextended J Balvin atop a convenient confluence of virally primed factors" which "proved irresistible to radio programmers and streaming playlisters", but he defined the use of Corona's sample a "plunder".

== Accolades ==
Award nominations for "Ritmo"
Year	Ceremony	Award	Result	Ref.
2020	Billboard Music Awards	Top Dance/Electronic Song	Nominated	
2020	MTV Video Music Awards	Best Collaboration	Nominated	
2020	Premios Nuestra Tierra	Best Dance/EDM Song	Won	
2020	Premios Nuestra Tierra	Public Choice Song	Nominated	
2021	Latin American Music Awards	Song of The Year	Nominated	
2021	Latin American Music Awards	Collaboration of the Year	Nominated	
2021	Latin American Music Awards	Favorite Urban Song	Nominated	
2021	Billboard Latin Music Awards	Hot Latin Song of the Year	Nominated	
2021	Billboard Latin Music Awards	Sales Song of the Year	Won	
2021	Billboard Latin Music Awards	Latin Rhythm Song of the Year	Nominated	
2021	Billboard Latin Music Awards	Vocal Event Hot Latin Song of the Year	Nominated	
2021	Premio Lo Nuestro	Crossover Collaboration of the Year	Nominated	
2021	Premio Lo Nuestro	Urban Collaboration of the Year	Nominated	
2021	Premio Lo Nuestro	Urban Song of the Year	Nominated	

== Music video ==
The official video of the song, directed by Colin Tilley, was released on YouTube on October 11, 2019, on the official YouTube's Black Eyed Peas channel.

== Commercial performance ==
The song debuted at number 100 on the US Billboard Hot 100 and peaked at number 26, staying on the chart for 27 weeks. It became the Black Eyed Peas' 17th Hot 100 entry and their first since "Don't Stop the Party" peaked at number 86 in 2011, as well as their first top 40 entry since "Just Can't Get Enough" peaked at number 3 in 2011. On Billboard's Mainstream Top 40 chart, the song peaked at number 8. The song spent 24 weeks at number one on the Hot Latin Songs chart.

== Charts ==
=== Weekly charts ===
Weekly chart performance for "Ritmo"
Chart (2019–2020)	Peak position
Global 200 (Billboard)	173
Argentina (Argentina Hot 100)	2
Australia (ARIA)	100
Austria (Ö3 Austria Top 40)	67
Belgium (Ultratop 50 Flanders)	30
Belgium (Ultratop 50 Wallonia)	27
Bolivia (Monitor Latino)	1
Brazil (Top 100 Brasil)	77
Canada Hot 100 (Billboard)	31
Canada CHR/Top 40 (Billboard)	2
Chile (Monitor Latino)	2
CIS Airplay (TopHit)	3
Colombia (National-Report)	1
Colombia (Monitor Latino)	1
Czech Republic Singles Digital (ČNS IFPI)	82
Ecuador (National-Report)	5
Ecuador (Monitor Latino)	5
El Salvador (Monitor Latino)	1
Euro Digital Song Sales (Billboard)	14
France (SNEP)	10
Germany (GfK)	24
Greece (IFPI)	19
Guatemala (Monitor Latino)	10
Honduras (Monitor Latino)	3
Hungary (Dance Top 40)	1
Hungary (Rádiós Top 40)	2
Hungary (Single Top 40)	13
Ireland (IRMA)	53
Israel International Airplay (Media Forest)	2
Italy (FIMI)	3
Lithuania (AGATA)	28
Netherlands (Single Top 100)	72
Nicaragua (Monitor Latino)	4
Panama (Monitor Latino)	2
Paraguay (Monitor Latino)	3
Paraguay (SGP)	2
Peru (Monitor Latino)	4
Poland Airplay (ZPAV)	11
Portugal (AFP)	11
Puerto Rico (Monitor Latino)	3
Romania (Airplay 100)	1
Russia Airplay (TopHit)	2
San Marino (SMRRTV Top 50)	18
Slovakia Airplay (ČNS IFPI)	31
Slovakia Singles Digital (ČNS IFPI)	48
Spain (PROMUSICAE)	2
Sweden (Sverigetopplistan)	72
Switzerland (Schweizer Hitparade)	6
Ukraine Airplay (TopHit)	3
Uruguay (Monitor Latino)	3
US Billboard Hot 100	26
US Adult Pop Airplay (Billboard)	27
US Dance Club Songs (Billboard)	2
US Hot Dance/Electronic Songs (Billboard)	1
US Hot Latin Songs (Billboard)	1
US Latin Airplay (Billboard)	1
US Pop Airplay (Billboard)	8
US Rhythmic Airplay (Billboard)	9
Venezuela (Monitor Latino)	2

2021 Weekly chart performance for "Ritmo"
Chart (2021)	Peak position
CIS Airplay (TopHit)	85
Moldova Airplay (TopHit)	122
Romania Airplay (TopHit)	126
Ukraine Airplay (TopHit)	53

2024 Weekly chart performance for "Ritmo"
Chart (2024)	Peak position
Estonia Airplay (TopHit)	81
Kazakhstan Airplay (TopHit)	189

=== Monthly charts ===
2019 monthly chart performance for "Ritmo"
Chart (2019)	Peak position
CIS Airplay (TopHit)	11
Latvia Airplay (LaIPA)	27
Russia Airplay (TopHit)	11
Slovakia (Singles Digitál Top 100)	73
Ukraine Airplay (TopHit)	97

2020 monthly chart performance for "Ritmo"
Chart (2020)	Peak position
CIS Airplay (TopHit)	4
Latvia Airplay (LaIPA)	23
Russia Airplay (TopHit)	2
Slovakia (Rádio Top 100)	40
Slovakia (Singles Digitál Top 100)	59
Ukraine Airplay (TopHit)	6

2021 monthly chart performance for "Ritmo"
Chart (2021)	Peak position
CIS Airplay (TopHit)	92
Slovakia (Rádio Top 100)	99
Ukraine Airplay (TopHit)	58

2024 monthly chart performance for "Ritmo"
Chart (2024)	Peak position
Estonia Airplay (TopHit)	92

=== Year-end charts ===
2019 year-end chart performance for "Ritmo"
Chart (2019)	Position
Italy (FIMI)	93
US Hot Dance/Electronic Songs (Billboard)	74

2020 year-end chart performance for "Ritmo"
Chart (2020)	Position
Argentina Airplay (Monitor Latino)	9
Belgium (Ultratop Flanders)	90
Belgium (Ultratop Wallonia)	79
Canada (Canadian Hot 100)	62
CIS Airplay (TopHit)	18
France (SNEP)	56
Germany (Official German Charts)	76
Hungary (Dance Top 40)	6
Hungary (Rádiós Top 40)	9
Hungary (Single Top 40)	69
Italy (FIMI)	67
Romania (Airplay 100)	12
Russia Airplay (TopHit)	22
Spain (PROMUSICAE)	35
Switzerland (Schweizer Hitparade)	54
Ukraine Airplay (TopHit)	25
US Billboard Hot 100	50
US Hot Dance/Electronic Songs (Billboard)	2
US Hot Latin Songs (Billboard)	1
US Latin Airplay (Billboard)	3
US Mainstream Top 40 (Billboard)	26
US Rhythmic (Billboard)	39

2021 year-end chart performance for "Ritmo"
Chart (2021)	Position
CIS Airplay (TopHit)	152
Hungary (Dance Top 40)	18
Russia Airplay (TopHit)	186
Ukraine Airplay (TopHit)	198

2024 year-end chart performance for "Ritmo"
Chart (2024)	Position
Estonia Airplay (TopHit)	115
Hungary (Rádiós Top 40)	72

=== Decade-end charts ===
20s Decade-end chart performance for "Ritmo"
Chart (2020–2024)	Position
CIS Airplay (TopHit)	121
Estonia Airplay (TopHit)	161
Moldova Airplay (TopHit)	96
Russia Airplay (TopHit)	181

=== All-time charts ===
All-time chart performance for "Ritmo"
Chart (2021)	Position
US Hot Latin Songs (Billboard)	12

== Certifications ==
Certifications and sales for "Ritmo"
Region	Certification	Certified units/sales
Australia (ARIA)	Gold	35,000^{‡}
Austria (IFPI Austria)	Gold	15,000^{‡}
Belgium (BRMA)	Gold	20,000^{‡}
Canada (Music Canada)	3× Platinum	240,000^{‡}
Denmark (IFPI Danmark)	Gold	45,000^{‡}
France (SNEP)	Diamond	333,333^{‡}
Germany (BVMI)	Gold	200,000^{‡}
Italy (FIMI)	2× Platinum	140,000^{‡}
Mexico (AMPROFON)	2× Diamond+Platinum+Gold	690,000^{‡}
New Zealand (RMNZ)	Gold	15,000^{‡}
Poland (ZPAV)	Platinum	50,000^{‡}
Portugal (AFP)	2× Platinum	20,000^{‡}
Spain (Promusicae)	4× Platinum	160,000^{‡}
Switzerland (IFPI Switzerland)	Platinum	20,000^{‡}
United Kingdom (BPI)	Silver	200,000^{‡}
United States (RIAA)	2× Platinum	2,000,000^{‡}
Streaming
Central America (CFC)	3× Platinum	21,000,000^{†}
Sweden (GLF)	Gold	4,000,000^{†}
^{‡} Sales+streaming figures based on certification alone.^{†} Streaming-only figures based on certification alone.

== See also ==
- List of Airplay 100 number ones of the 2020s
- List of Billboard Argentina Hot 100 top-ten singles in 2019
- List of Billboard Hot Latin Songs and Latin Airplay number ones of 2020
