= Lola Marsh =

Israeli indie pop band

Lola Marsh לולה מארש
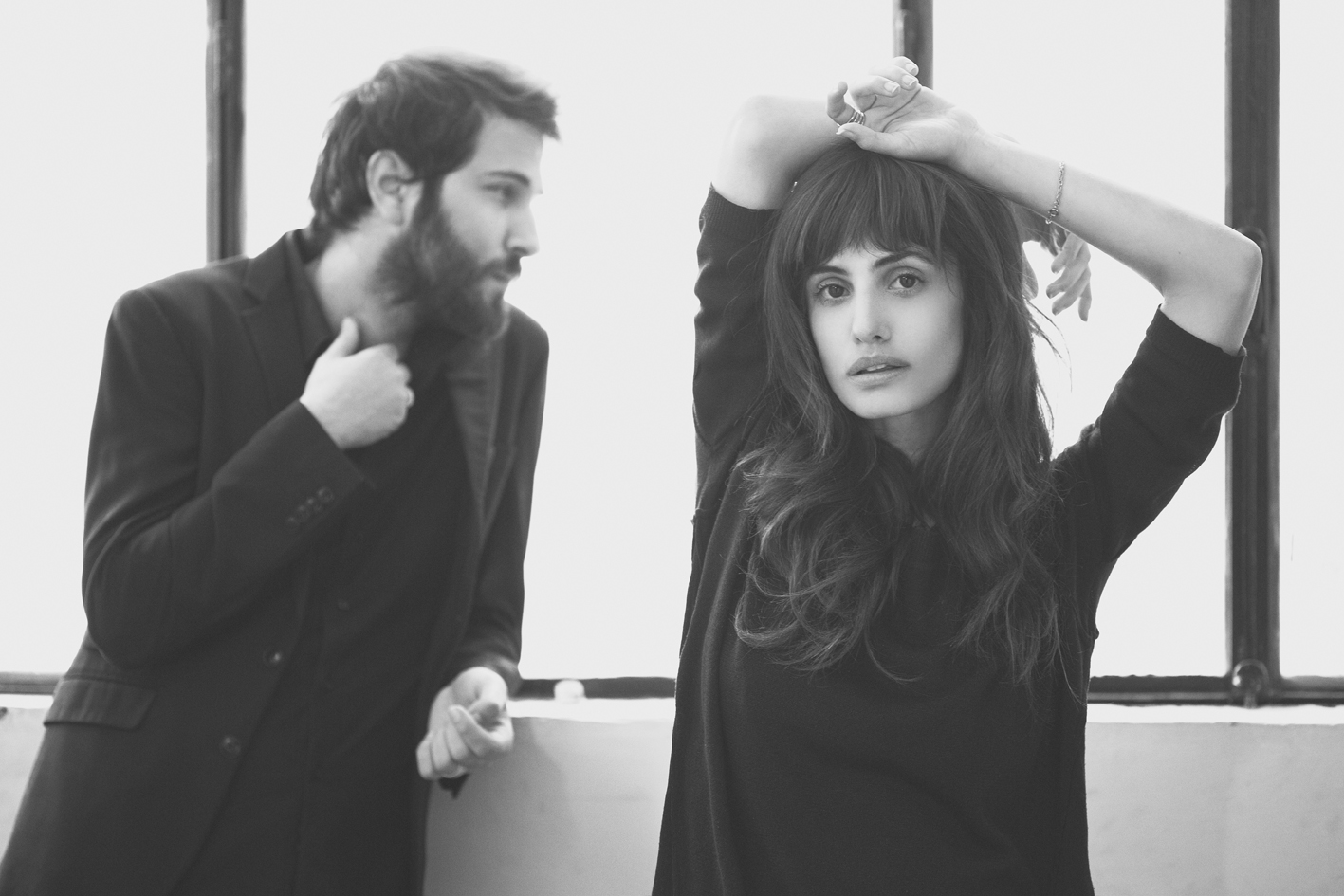
- Gil Landau (left) and Yael Shoshana Cohen

Background information
- Origin: Tel Aviv, Israel
- Genres: Dream pop; indie pop
- Years active: 2013–present
- Labels: Anova Music; Universal-Barclay; Sony ATV
- Members: Gil Landau; Yael Shoshana Cohen; Mati Gilad; Dekel Dvir; Ran Gil
- Past members: Ido Rivlin; Rami Osservaser; Baruch Spiegelberg
- Website: lolamarsh.com

Lola Marsh (Hebrew: לולה מארש) is an Israeli indie pop band from Tel Aviv. The band was formed as a duo in 2013 by Gil Landau (guitars, keyboards) and Yael Shoshana Cohen (vocals), and was quickly signed by the indie label Anova Music. The group released their first EP, You're Mine, under Universal Records-Barclay in January 2016.

== History ==
Gil Landau and Yael Shoshana Cohen met in Tel Aviv through mutual friends. The idea of the group was conceived at Landau's birthday party in February 2011, when the band members began playing songs on Landau's father's old guitar.

Landau and Shoshana dated briefly while forming the band, but went back to being bandmates.

Landau and Cohen wrote and performed songs for 18 months before bringing on additional musicians. Mati Gilad (Bass), Rami Osservaser (Guitar, Keyboards), Dekel Dvir (Drums and samplers) joined them shortly after. The group started performing in local clubs. They were spotted by the leading local indie label Anova Music who signed the band. The band's name was arrived at when the members were calling out possible names for the group and the name Lola Marsh was suggested and stuck.

The duo gained notoriety on the heels of their 2014 performance at Primavera Sound Festival.

The band premiered their first single, "Sirens", via Nylon Magazine in March 2015; Nylon said of the song: "The Dreamy Tel Aviv Band's latest song, "Sirens", offers a twist on the typical sweet-yet-gritty indie sound...The track seems ready made for Quentin Tarantino's next film score." The song was later featured in the American TV show Scream.

The band's second single, "You're Mine", was released in May 2015 via Pigeons and Plane. It garnered over six million plays on Spotify and landed in the service's top 3 Most Viral Tracks as well as in the top 3 of Hype Machine's Most Popular Tracks ranking.

Lola Marsh's debut EP, You're Mine, was released in January 2016. Their third single, "She's a Rainbow", was released in May 2016. In March 2017 Their Single "Wishing Girl" was released and was accompanied with a video directed by Gal Muggia. The Band's debut album, Remember Roses, was released in June 2017 via Universal Records-Barclay, Sony ATV, Verve and Anova Music.

Following the album release the band toured Europe and the US playing summer festivals such as Paleo festival. Montreal Jazz Festival, Sziget festival.

In February 2018, the band released a live session recorded at Capitol Records Los Angeles. Lola Marsh was featured on NPR's The Austin 100 in March 2018 as part of a SXSW event feature. Later that month, the duo performed multiple shows at SXSW.

The band's cover of "Somethin' Stupid" featured in the eponymous episode of Better Call Saul in 2018, and an instrumental version was played in "Bad Choice Road" in 2020.

Their second album, Someday Tomorrow Maybe, was released in January 2020. Their music videos ''Echoes'' and ''Only for a Moment'' were recognized by international festival Berlin Music Video Awards in 2020. ''Echoes'' won the Best Song category and ''Only for a Moment'' placed second in the Best Cinematography category.

In May 2024, the duo performed in a Tel Aviv rally demanding the release of hostages amid the Gaza war hostage crisis. Eden Golan, Netta Barzilai and Noga Erez also performed. Family members of hostages also spoke, including Rachel Goldberg-Polin, mother of American-Israeli Hersh Goldberg-Polin. Ambassadors from the United States, United Kingdom, Germany and Austria also addressed the crowds. Former Secretary of State, Hillary Clinton also appeared in a video message.

== Musical influences ==
They cite Sufjan Stevens, Nina Simone, Fleet Foxes, Elvis Presley, Moody Blues, Bon Iver, MGMT and LCD Soundsystem as major influences on their music.

== Discography ==
Albums

- Remember Roses (2017)
- Someday Tomorrow Maybe (2020)
- Shot Shot Cherry (2022)

EP

- You're Mine (2016)

== Awards and nominations ==
Award Ceremony	Year	Nominated work	Category	Result
Berlin Music Video Awards	2020	ONLY FOR A MOMENT	BEST CINEMATOGRAPHY	Nominated
Berlin Music Video Awards	2020	ECHOES	BEST SONG	Winner
