= Remember Roses =

Studio album by Lola Marsh
- Released: 9 June 2017
- Length: 40:59
- Label: Anova Music; Universal

Lola Marsh chronology
You're Mine (2016)	Remember Roses (2017)	Someday Tomorrow Maybe (2020)

Remember Roses is the debut studio album by Israeli pop group Lola Marsh. It was released worldwide on 9 June 2017.

== Tracks ==
No.	Title	Length
1.	"You're Mine"	4:13
2.	"Remember Roses"	3:03
3.	"Wishing Girl"	3:12
4.	"She's a Rainbow"	3:44
5.	"Bluebird"	3:20
6.	"The Wind"	2:45
7.	"Sirens"	3:37
8.	"Stranger"	3:29
9.	"Sirens (Interlude)"	0:35
10.	"Morning Bells"	3:04
11.	"Hometown"	3:42
12.	"In Good Times"	2:51
13.	"Le Sud"	3:24
Total length:		40:59

== Charts ==
Chart (2017)	Peak position
Belgian Albums (Ultratop Wallonia)	199
Swiss Albums (Schweizer Hitparade)	100
