= J. Rey Soul =

Filipino-American singer (born 1997)

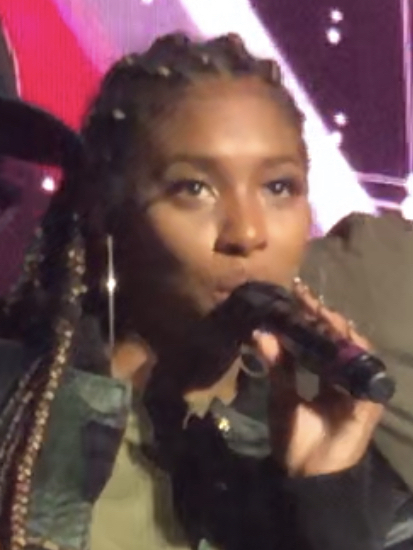
- Reynoso in 2018

Background information
- Also known as: J. Rey Soul
- Born: Jessica Joy Seria Reynoso; October 7, 1997 (age 28); Hong Kong, China
- Genres: R&B; pop; hip hop
- Occupation: Singer
- Years active: 2007–2009, 2013–present
- Member of: Black Eyed Peas
- Education: PATTS College of Aeronautics (BSBA)

Jessica Joy Seria Reynoso (born October 7, 1997), known professionally as J. Rey Soul, is a Filipino-American singer known for participating in the first season of The Voice of the Philippines and collaborating and touring with the Black Eyed Peas since 2018.

Starting her musical career at an early age, she appeared on the first season of The Voice of the Philippines and joined coach apl.de.ap's team, becoming a finalist in the show. After a couple of released singles and a collaboration with apl.de.ap, Reynoso joined the Black Eyed Peas, replacing Fergie as their singer in 2018.

== Early life and career ==
Jessica Joy Seria Reynoso was born on October 7, 1997, in Hong Kong, China, to an African-American father and a Filipino mother. Having been abandoned at some point by her parents, she would later be adopted and raised in, San Pedro, Laguna, Philippines by her adoptive parents who exposed her to music at a young age. She also has an aunt who is a singer in Hong Kong. According to Reynoso, she was able to sing the Whitney Houston song "The Greatest Love of All" in front of her family at age 5. In 2007, she joined the competition show Popstar Kids at age 10. In a later interview, she says that she didn't get much attention due to her skin color. She completed her contract with the GMA Network, the network who produced the show, in 2012. She attended PATTS College of Aeronautics taking Air Freight Operations.

== Career ==
On July 21, 2013, Reynoso auditioned for the first season of The Voice of the Philippines, singing the Alicia Keys song "Fallin'". Coaches Lea Salonga and apl.de.ap tried to get her on their respective teams, with Reynoso choosing Team Apl for the competition. In the fourth live-show episode of the show, Reynoso was put against Janice Javier, with Reynoso losing to Javier when the scores of the coaches and the audience was added up. In 2014, Reynoso was signed to apl.de.ap's label, BMBX.

In 2018, Reynoso (now going under her stage name J. Rey Soul) collaborated with apl.de.ap's group Black Eyed Peas on their album Masters of the Sun Vol. 1, after previous singer Fergie departed from the group. She had been inducted into the group as a "semi-official" member who would collaborate and tour with them. In 2020, she collaborated with them again alongside rapper Ozuna with the song "Mamacita". She was then involved with their albums Translation (2020) and Elevation (2022).

In 2021, she signed with Epic Records and released the single "Pull Up" with will.i.am featuring Nile Rodgers, which was used for the Mercedes-Benz AMG campaign. That same year, she sang the national anthem of the Philippines at the professional boxing match between Manny Pacquiao and Yordenis Ugás.

== Discography ==
=== As lead artist ===
Title	Year	Album
"Pull Up" (with will.i.am featuring Nile Rodgers)	2021	Non-album singles
"Holla"	2024	Non-album singles
"It's Saturday" (with DJ Yousef and will.i.am)	2024	Non-album singles

=== Guest appearances ===
Title	Year	Other artist(s)	Album
"Mamacita"	2020	Black Eyed Peas	Translation
"Tonta Love"'	2020	Black Eyed Peas	Translation
"Double D'z"	2022	Black Eyed Peas	Elevation
"Guarantee"	2022	Black Eyed Peas	Elevation
"Filipina Queen"	2022	Black Eyed Peas	Elevation
