= 2026 MAMA Awards =

28th edition of the MAMA Awards held in 2026

- Date: November 20–21, 2026
- Venue: Kyocera Dome Osaka, Japan
- Presented by: Visa
- Hosted by: Park Bo-gum

Highlights
- Most wins: BTS (5)
- Most nominations: Cortis (10)
- Website: 2026mama.com

Television/radio coverage
- Network: Mnet

The 2026 MAMA Awards took place on November 20 and 21 at the Kyocera Dome Osaka in Japan. Actor and singer Park Bo-gum returned to host the ceremony and as a MAMA Ambassador.

== Background ==
The ceremony is organized by CJ ENM through its music channel Mnet. The theme for the 28th edition of the show is "Move The Stars, A Music Interstellar," creating a stage concept that brings music and space together.

=== Selection process ===
All songs and albums that are eligible to be nominated must be released from October 1, 2025, to September 30, 2026.

Criteria for 2024 MAMA Awards nominations
Category	Digital sales (Download + Streaming)	Record sales	Online voting	Judges panel evaluations
Album of the Year	N/A	60%	N/A	40%
Artist of the Year	30% (15% Korea + 15% Global)	30%	N/A	40%
Categories by Artist (Note: Consists of Best New Male & Female Artist, Best Male & Female Artist, and Best Male & Female Group.)	30% (15% Korea + 15% Global)	30%	N/A	40%
Song of the Year	60% (30% Korea + 30% Global)	N/A		40%
Categories by Genre (Note: Consists of Best Dance Performance – Male & Female Solo & Group, Best Vocal Performance – Solo & Group, Best Rap & Hip Hop Music, Best Collaboration, and Best OST.)	50% (25% Korea + 25% Global)	N/A		50%
Best Song Top 10	100% (50% Korea + 50% Global)	N/A		
Best Music Video & Best Choreography	N/A			100%
Special Awards	N/A			100%
Fans' Choice Categories	N/A		110% (90% Mnet Plus + 10% X/Twitter Votes + 10% Mnet Plus Live Vote)	N/A
Data Sources: Circle Chart (Domestic/Global Song Streaming/Downloads, Album Sales), X (SNS Voting Data)

Round 1 voting for Fans' Choice Male & Female started on October 12, 19:00 KST until October 22, 23:59 KST. Round 2 voting together with Fans' Choice of the Year is to be conducted from October 28, 18:00 KST until November 8, 23:59 KST. Voting for Fans' Choice of the Year will reopen during the live broadcast on November 20.

== Presenters ==
The first line-up of presenters was announced on October 22, 2026. Lee Dae-hwi and Choi Mina Sue were announced as the Red Carpet MCs on October 27, 2026.

- Chang Hang-jun
- Choi Dae-hoon
- Heo Nam-jun
- Hwang Min-hyun
- Jang Keun-suk
- Jo Yuri
- Kany
- Kim Hye-soo
- Kim Jae-won
- Kim Yeon-koung
- Kim You-jung
- Lee Chae-min
- Lee Da-hee
- Lee Jun-ho
- Lee Sang-yi
- Lee Sung-kyung
- Lee Sung-min
- Monika Shin
- Moon Sang-min
- Ong Seong-wu
- Seo In-young
- Seorina
- Shunsuke Michieda
- Yoo In-na
- Yoon Kyung-ho

== Performers ==
The first line-up of performers was announced on October 13, 2026, while the second line-up was announced three days later.

=== Chapter 1 (November 20) ===
Performances for Day 1
Artist(s)	Song(s) Performed	Theme
Street World Fighter: Directors' War (Note: Consists of Back Kooyoung, Kasper, Bada, Simeez, Renan, Hash, Ingyoo, Babyzoo, Nain, Jeong Min-jun); Babymonster	"Docking Complete" (Dance performance); Intro + "Deserve" + "Choom" (MAMA version)	A Music Interstellar
Lngshot; Modyssey; Tuide	"Bananas" (MAMA version; Lngshot) "Hook" + "Ridin' (Can You Hear That)" (MAMA version; Modyssey); Intro + "Sunkiss" (MAMA version; Tuide) "That That"	New Star Wars
Rescene	"With" (MAMA version) "Love Attack" (MAMA version)	Here We Are
Alpha Drive One	Intro + "Diamond Hour" + "Raw Flame" "Born Dire"	少年Beast
Hearts2Hearts	Intro (Note: Special appearances of Choi Dae-hoon and Kim Yeon-koung) + "Iconic Heart" (Korean version) + "Rude!" (MAMA version)	Iconic Force
INI	"You Know What to Do" (MAMA version) + "All 4 U" (MAMA version)	Full Count
Illit	Intro + "It's Me" (MAMA version) "D.B: Secret Agent" + "You're Under Arrest"	SE.A.L: Secret of Agent Love
NCT Wish	"Everglow" + "I Spy" (MAMA version)	I(愛) Spy
Panic	Intro (Note: Special appearance of Cho Yeo-jeong) + "The Sea in My Worn Drawer" (with Kim Tae-rae, Woochan, Yuha, and Woodz) "Left-Handed" (with Martin and Seonghyeon)	Mutants' Party
Treasure	"If I" (MAMA version) "Free Yøur Mind" (Choi Hyun-suk solo) "Shock" (Band version)	Back to the Real
AllDay Project; CL	"Crash" (MAMA version; AllDay Project) "Say It to My Face" + "Iconic" (MAMA version; CL) "Fire" (MAMA version; CL with Annie, Bailey, and Youngseo) "I Am the Best" (MAMA version; CL with Annie, Bailey, and Youngseo)	Still the Baddest
Enhypen (Note: In Partnership with Dune: Part Three)	"I Want You" "Big Girls Don't Cry" "Knife" "Bloody Paradise"	Paradise X Dune

=== Chapter 2 (November 21) ===
Performances for Day 2
Artist(s)	Song(s) Performed	Theme
KO1Keyz	Intro + "Shinsekai" "KO1Keyz" (Korean version) "White Love" (Korean version)	We Are Now Going to the New World
Izna; KiiiKiii; I.O.I (Note: Consists of Lim Na-young, Choi Yoo-jung, and Jeon Somi)	"Bad Girl Good Girl" (KiiiKiii) "The Boys" (Izna) "La Vie en Rose" (Izna and KiiiKiii) "404 (New Era)" (MAMA version; KiiiKiii) "Metronome" (MAMA version; Izna) "Suddenly"	Girls Never Stop
&Team	"Good Boy" (MAMA version)	Time Between Dog and Wolf
Cortis	"RedRed" "TNT"	MAMA: Cortis About to TNT
Nayeon	Intro: "Pop!" "Baby Angel" "ABCD" (MAMA version)	I'm Anyone
Zerobaseone	"Top 5" "Run" (Zerobaseone EMP and Dynamic Duo) "Undead" (Sung Han-bin solo) "The Next Course"	The Next Course
Woodz	"Come into My World!"	Hi My World, Bye My Love
Hwasa	"So Cute" "Good Goodbye"	Hi My World, Bye My Love
Le Sserafim	Intro + "Saki" "Spaghetti" (MAMA version)	My World, My Rules
Ive	"Snakeskin" "Blackhole" "Bang Bang"	Ive ThrIve
BigBang	"Bad" (Taeyang solo) "Live Fast Die Slow" (Taeyang solo) "Time Cosmos Medley" "GiiiRip" "Biig"	Wow, Biig Cosmos!

== Winners and nominees ==
The list of nominees was announced via livestream on October 12, 2026, and voting for Fans' Choice started shortly after. Song of the Year will be chosen from Best Song Top 10 winners.

Winners and nominees are listed in alphanumerical order, with winners listed first and emphasised in bold.

=== Grand prize ===
**Artist of the Year** **(Daesang)**: **BTS**; Aespa; Ateez; Blackpink; Cortis; List of longlisted nominees: Alpha Drive One; And2ble; Babymonster; BigBang; D.O.; Enhypen; Evan; Hiipe Princess; Hearts2Hearts; Hrtz.wav; Hwasa; Illit; Irene; Ive; Le Sserafim; Lngshot; Modyssey; NCT Wish; Nmixx; Ourbirthday; Soyeon; Stray Kids; Taeyang; Taeyeon; Taeyong; Tuide; Tomorrow X Together; Unchild; Yena; Yeonjun; Young K	**Song of the Year** **(Daesang)**: **Cortis – "RedRed"**; Aespa – "Lemonade"; BTS – "Swim"; Hearts2Hearts – "Rude!"; Hwasa – "Good Goodbye"; Illit – "It's Me"; Ive - "Bang Bang"; I.O.I - "Suddenly"; Le Sserafim - "Spaghetti" (featuring J-Hope); Nmixx – "Blue Valentine"
**Album of the Year** **(Daesang)**: **BTS – Arirang**; List of longlisted nominees: &Team – Mark on Me; Aespa – Lemonade; Alpha Drive One – Euphoria; Ateez – Golden Hour: Part.5; Blackpink – Deadline; BoyNextDoor – The Action; Cortis – GreenGreen; Enhypen – The Sin: Vanish; Exo – Reverxe; Ive – Revive+; NCT Dream – Beat It Up; NCT Wish – Ode to Love; Plave – Caligo Pt.2; Riize – II; Stray Kids – This & That; TWS – No Tragedy; Tomorrow X Together – 7th Year: A Moment of Stillness in the Thorns	**Fans' Choice of the Year** **(Daesang)**: **Enhypen**

=== Main awards ===
**Best Male Group**: **BTS**; Ateez; BigBang; Cortis; Enhypen; NCT Wish; Stray Kids; Tomorrow X Together	**Best Female Group**: **Ive**; Aespa; Babymonster; Blackpink; Illit; Hearts2Hearts; Le Sserafim; Nmixx
**Best Male Artist**: **Yeonjun**; D.O.; Taeyang; Taeyong; Young K	**Best Female Artist**: **Soyeon**; Hwasa; Irene; Taeyeon; Yena
**Best Dance Performance – Male Group**: **Cortis – "RedRed"**; Ateez – "Bad"; BigBang – "Biiig"; BoyNextDoor – "Hollywood Action"; Riize – "Do Your Dance"; Stray Kids – "This & That"; TWS – "Overdrive"; Zerobaseone – "Top 5"	**Best Dance Performance – Female Group**: **Illit – "It's Me"**; Aespa – "Lemonade"; Hearts2Hearts – "Rude!"; I.O.I – "Suddenly"; Ive – "Bang Bang"; KiiiKiii – "404 (New Era)"; Le Sserafim – "Spaghetti" (featuring J-Hope); Nmixx – "Blue Valentine"
**Best Dance Performance – Male Solo**: **Taeyang – "Live Fast Die Slow"**; Onew – "Tough Love"; Taemin – "Float"; Taeyong – "WYLD"; Yeonjun – "Ice Cream"	**Best Dance Performance – Female Solo**: **Yena – "Catch Catch"**; Bibi – "Bumpa"; Dayoung – "What's a Girl to Do"; Soyeon – "I'm Gonna Toesa" (featuring Kian84); Yuna – "Ice Cream"
**Best Vocal Performance – Solo**: **Hwasa – "Good Goodbye"**; IU – "Unknown Planet"; Jennie – "Less Than a Lover"; Roy Kim – "No Words Can Say"; Woodz – "Cinema"	**Best Vocal Performance – Group**: **AKMU – "Paradise of Rumors"**; BTS – "Swim"; Davichi – "Time Capsule"; DxS – "Blue"; Mamamoo – "4 Flowers"
**Best Rap & Hip Hop Performance**: **Zico & Lilas Ikuta – "Duet"**; Big Naughty – "Nostalgia"; Haon – "Yarrr"; Nowimyoung – "Kolok Colok"; Treasure – "If I"	**Best Band Performance**: **Jannabi – "Just Kids"**; Lucy– "All Ages"; QWER – "Ceremony"; Silica Gel – "Big Void"; Xdinary Heroes – "Voyager"
**Best OST**: **Kim Min-seok – "Love Language" (from Can This Love Be Translated?)**; Migak Boys – "My Flavor" (from The Legend of Kitchen Soldier); Sung Si-kyung – "Anytime Anyhow" (from Surely Tomorrow); Suzy – "A Day" (from Exchange 4); Young K– "Season of Us" (from My Royal Nemesis)	**Best Collaboration**: **Le Sserafim – "Spaghetti" (featuring J-Hope)**; Aespa – "WDA (Whole Different Animal)" (featuring G-Dragon); Dayoung & Jay Park – "Flirty"; Le Sserafim, Illit & Katseye – "Iconic by Mistake"; Parc Jae-jung & Sullyoon– "Always"
**Best Music Video**: **BigBang** – "Biiig"; BTS – "2.0"; Hwasa – "Good Goodbye"; I-dle – "Mono" (featuring Skaiwater); Meovv – "Ddi Ro Ri"	**Best Choreography**: **Ateez – "Bad"**; Cortis – "RedRed"; Illit – "It's Me"; Ive – "Bang Bang"; Yena – "Catch Catch"
**Best New Artist**: **Alpha Drive One**; **Tuide**; And2ble; Evan; Hiipe Princess; Hrtz.wav; Lngshot; Modyssey; Ourbirthday; Unchild	**Best Song Top 10**: **Aespa – "Lemonade"**; **BTS – "Swim"**; **Cortis – "RedRed"**; **Hearts2Hearts – "Rude!"**; **Hwasa – "Good Goodbye"**; **Illit – "It's Me"**; **Ive - "Bang Bang"**; **I.O.I - "Suddenly"**; **Le Sserafim - "Spaghetti" (featuring J-Hope)**; **Nmixx – "Blue Valentine"**

=== Popularity awards ===
**Fans' Choice Top 10 – Female**: **Apink**; **Babymonster**; **Hearts2Hearts**; **I-dle**; **Illit**; **Le Sserafim**; **Nmixx**; **Tuide**; **Twice**; **Yoona**; List of longlisted nominees: Aespa; AKMU; AllDay Project; Apoki; Artms; AtHeart; Baby Dont Cry; Bibi; Billlie; Blackpink; Chuu; CSR; Davichi; Dayoung; Dodree; EJel; Fifty Fifty; Fromis 9; Hanroro; I.O.I; Itzy; Ive; Izna; Kep1er; KiiiKiii; Kiss of Life; Lee Young-ji; Mamamoo; Meovv; Mimi; Red Velvet; Rescene; Taeyeon; Unis; VVUP; X:IN; Yena; Yoon Mi-rae; Younha; Yuju	**Fans' Choice Top 10 – Male**: **BigBang**; **BTS**; **Cortis**; **Enhypen**; **Evan**; **Lngshot**; **Seventeen**; **Stray Kids**; **Treasure**; **Tomorrow X Together**; List of longlisted nominees: &Team; 82Major; 8Turn; AEN; AHOF; Alpha Drive One; And2ble; Ateez; AxMxP; B1A4; BoyNextDoor; Close Your Eyes; CNBLUE; Cravity; Day6; Evnne; Exo; Flare U; Hrtz.wav; Hui; Idid; Jannabi; Jay Park; KickFlip; NCT 127; NCT Dream; NCT Wish; Nexz; NouerA; Park Ji-hoon; Plave; Riize; Shinee; Super Junior; TWS; Woodz; Xlov; Xodiac; Zerobaseone; Zico
**Worldwide KCONer's Choice**: **Zerobaseone – "Customize"**; Alpha Drive One – "Formula"; Cortis – "YoungCreatorCrew"; Izna – "Mamma Mia"; JO1 – "It's Coming" (JO1 version); P1Harmony – "Unique"; Santos Bravos – "Velocidade"; Tomorrow X Together – "0X1=Lovesong (I Know I Love You)" (featuring Seori); Treasure – "If I"; &Team – "We on Fire" (Korean version)	**Favorite MCD Stage with Mnet Plus**: **August: Enhypen – "Bloody Paradise"**; January: Enhypen – "Big Girls Don't Cry"; February: NCT JNJM – "Both Sides"; March: Yuna – "Ice Cream"; April: Cortis – "RedRed"; May: Zerobaseone – "Top 5"; June: Hearts2Hearts – "Lemon Tang"; July: V8 – "Singasong"; September: Evan – "Death of Me"; October: Hearts2Hearts – "Iconic Heart" (Korean version)
**Visa Super Stage Artist**: **Treasure**; Alpha Drive One; Ive; Le Sserafim; NCT Wish; Zerobaseone

=== Special awards ===
**Favorite Asian Group**: **INI**	**Best of Next**: **Rescene**
**Best Breakthrough**: **NCT Wish**	**Qoo10 Favorite Mega Artist**: **NCT Wish**
**Favourite Dance & Vocal Group Performance**: **Zerobaseone**	**Music Visionary of the Year**: **BigBang**

== Broadcast ==
Chapter 1 (November 20)
Red Carpet	3:30 PM KST
Main Ceremony	6:00 PM KST
Chapter 2 (November 21)
Red Carpet	12:30 PM KST
Main Ceremony	3:00 PM KST

Region	Network
Worldwide	YouTube (Mnet K-Pop, Mnet TV, M2, and KCON Official) (Note: YouTube Live Stream restricted in listed regions with a local broadcasting partner.) and Mnet Plus
South Korea	Mnet, tvN Show & TVING
Japan	Mnet Japan, Mnet Smart+ & U-Next
Hong Kong	tvN Asia, HBO Max
Singapore	tvN Asia, HBO Max
Malaysia	tvN Asia, HBO Max
Indonesia	tvN Asia, HBO Max
Philippines	tvN Asia, HBO Max
Taiwan	tvN Asia, HBO Max
Myanmar	tvN Asia, HBO Max
Thailand	HBO Max
Brunei	HBO Max
Cambodia	HBO Max
Laos	HBO Max
Macao	HBO Max
Mongolia	HBO Max
Palau	HBO Max
Papua New Guinea	HBO Max
Solomon Islands	HBO Max
Timor Leste	HBO Max
United States	Samsung TV Plus (K-POP by CJ ENM)
Canada	Samsung TV Plus (K-POP by CJ ENM)
Brazil	Samsung TV Plus (K-POP by CJ ENM)
Mexico	Samsung TV Plus (K-POP by CJ ENM)
United Kingdom	Samsung TV Plus (K-POP by CJ ENM)
Germany	Samsung TV Plus (K-POP by CJ ENM)
Italy	Samsung TV Plus (K-POP by CJ ENM)
Spain	Samsung TV Plus (K-POP by CJ ENM)
Sweden	Samsung TV Plus (K-POP by CJ ENM)
Netherlands	Samsung TV Plus (K-POP by CJ ENM)
Australia	Samsung TV Plus (K-POP by CJ ENM)
New Zealand	Samsung TV Plus (K-POP by CJ ENM)
France	Samsung TV Plus (K-POP by CJ ENM), France TV (France 4, france.tv)
Russia	IVI
Armenia	IVI
Azerbaijan	IVI
Belarus	IVI
Kazakhstan	IVI
Kyrgyzstan	IVI
Tajikistan	IVI
Turkmenistan	IVI
Moldova	IVI
Uzbekistan	IVI
Georgia	IVI
