= RedRed =

Single by Cortis

from the EP GreenGreen
- Language: Korean; English
- Released: April 20, 2026
- Length: 2:43
- Label: BigHit
- Songwriters: Hiss Noise; "Hitman" Bang; Martin; Jasper Harris; Skillies; Seonghyeon; Keonho; Skai; James; Juhoon; Derrick Milano; Jacob Aaron (The Hub)
- Producers: Hiss Noise; Supreme Boi; "Hitman" Bang; Jasper Harris; Skillies; Skai

Cortis singles chronology
"Mention Me" (2026)	"RedRed" (2026)	"Motion (featuring Juicy J)" (2026)

"RedRed" (syled in all caps) is a song by South Korean boy band Cortis. It was released on April 20, 2026, as part of their second EP, GreenGreen, through BigHit Music. As of November 2026, the song has over 275 million streams on Spotify.

== Background ==
On March 6, 2026, BigHit Music announced that Cortis would be releasing their second EP, GreenGreen on May 4 and simulatenously announced that the lead single would be released on April 20.

== Composition ==
"RedRed" features 2000s electroclash. The song uses the colors green and red to describe what the group's likes and dislikes are.

== Chart performance ==
Chart	Peak position
Korea (Circle Digital Chart)	1
Japan Hot 100 (Billboard)	32
New Zealand (Recorded Music NZ)	13
US Bubbling Under Hot 100 (Billboard)	17
Malaysia International Singles (Recording Industry Association)	5
Singapore (Recording Industry Association)	6
Taiwan Songs (Billboard)	2
US World Digital (Billboard)	10
Vietnam Hot 100 (Billboard)	3
Global 200 (Billboard)	38

== Accolodes ==
Award ceremony	Year	Category	Result	Ref.
KM Chart Awards	2026	Record of the Year	Won	
KM Chart Awards	2026	Ultimate 12	Won	
MAMA Awards	2026	Song of the Year	Won	
MAMA Awards	2026	Best Dance Performance Male Group	Won	
MAMA Awards	2026	Best Song Top 10	Won	
MAMA Awards	2026	Favorite MCD Stage with Mnet Plus (April)	Nominated	
MAMA Awards	2026	Best Choreography	Nominated	
Melon Music Awards	2026	Song of the Year	Nominated	
MTV Video Music Awards	2026	Best K-pop	Nominated	
