= We Made =

- Digital cover

EP by I-dle
- Released: July 6, 2026
- Length: 13:39
- Languages: English; Korean
- Labels: Cube; Kakao

I-dle chronology
I-dle (2025)	We Made (2026)

Singles from We Made
- 1. "Mono" Released: January 27, 2026; 2. "Crow" Released: June 15, 2026; 3. "Gimme Dat Love" Released: July 6, 2026

We Made is the ninth Korean extended play and fourteenth overall (Note: When combined with special, Japanese-language and English-language EPs) by South Korean girl group I-dle. It was released by Cube Entertainment on July 6, 2026, and contains six tracks, including the standalone single "Mono", the pre-release single "Crow", and the lead single "Gimme Dat Love".

== Background and release ==
On June 8, 2026, Cube Entertainment announced that I-dle would be releasing their ninth Korean extended play titled We Made on July 6. On June 9, upon the release of the promotion scheduler, it was announced that the track "Crow" from the extended play, previously performed by the group during the Syncopation World Tour, would be pre-released as a single on June 15. Concept images for "Crow" were released on June 11 and 12. On June 14, the music video for "Crow" was released, ahead of the single's release on June 15. The mood trailer for the extended play was released on June 22. Upon the track list's reveal on June 24, it was confirmed that the lead single would be titled "Gimme Dat Love", and the previously released single "Mono", featuring British rapper and record producer Skaiwater, would be included in the extended play. On June 26, an audio snippet video was released with short previews of the album's tracks. Concept photos and music video teasers for "Gimme Dat Love" were released alternately from June 29 to July 3. On July 6, following the release of the final music video teaser, the extended play was released alongside the music video for "Gimme Dat Love".

== Track listing ==
We Made — Digital album
No.	Title	Lyrics	Music	Arrangement	Length
1.	"Mono" (featuring Skaiwater)	Icebluerabbit; Shannon Bae; Skaiwater	Icebluerabbit; Daily; Shannon Bae; Kameron Glasper; Likey	Daily; Likey	2:50
2.	"Gimme Dat Love"	Icebluerabbit; Alyx; Samantha Camara; Shannon Bae	Abraham Olaleye "Daramola"; Alyx; Samantha Camara; Daily	Daramola; Daily	2:26
3.	"Morning"	Icebluerabbit; Shannon Bae	Daily; Likey; Shannon Bae; Kameron Glasper	Daily; Likey	2:35
4.	"Crow"	Soyeon	Mortal; Jumal of SMGS	Mortal; Jumal of SMGS	3:11
5.	"Love Is Pain"	Yuqi; Scott Quinn	Yuqi; Siixk Jun; Scott Quinn; Jinsol; Stella Jones	Jinsol; Siixk Jun	2:37
Total length:					13:39

We Made — Physical album bonus track
No.	Title	Lyrics	Music	Arrangement	Length
6.	"Mono" (featuring Skaiwater; Mono version)	Icebluerabbit; Shannon Bae; Skaiwater	Icebluerabbit; Daily; Shannon Bae; Kameron Glasper; Likey	Daily; Likey	2:50
Total length:					16:29

== Charts ==
=== Weekly charts ===
Weekly chart performance for We Made
Chart (2026)	Peak position
French Physical Albums (SNEP)	40
Japanese Albums (Oricon)	16
Japanese Combined Albums (Oricon)	29
Japanese Download Albums (Billboard Japan)	11
Japanese Top Albums Sales (Billboard Japan)	14
South Korean Albums (Circle)	2
US Top Album Sales (Billboard)	46
US World Albums (Billboard)	12

=== Monthly charts ===
Monthly chart performance for We Made
Chart (2026)	Position
South Korean Albums (Circle)	2

== Certifications ==
Certifications for We Made
Region	Certification	Certified units/sales
South Korea (KMCA)	2× Platinum	500,000^{^}
^{^} Shipments figures based on certification alone.

== Release history ==
Release history for We Made
Region	Date	Format	Label
South Korea	July 6, 2026	CD	Cube; Kakao
Various	July 6, 2026	Digital download; streaming	Cube; Kakao
