= GreenGreen =

2026 extended play by Cortis

EP by Cortis
- Released: May 4, 2026
- Genres: Alternative rock; hip hop; EDM
- Length: 16:03
- Languages: Korean; English
- Label: BigHit Music
- Producers: Hiss Noise; Supreme Boi; Thom Bridges; Slush Puppy; Zach Fogarty; "Hitman" Bang; Jasper Harris; Skillies; Skai; Martin; Mike Bozzi; Seonghyeon; Synthetic; Venny; Sean Cook; Savesomeone

Cortis chronology
Color Outside the Lines (2025)	GreenGreen (2026)

Singles from GreenGreen
- 1. "RedRed" Released: April 20, 2026

GreenGreen (stylized in all caps) is the second extended play by South Korean boy band Cortis. The EP was released by BigHit Music on May 4, 2026, and supported by the lead single "RedRed". It charted at number one on the Circle Album Chart, number two on the Oricon Albums Chart, and number three on the Billboard 200.

== Background and release ==
On March 6, 2026, Cortis announced their second EP, GreenGreen, to be released on May 4, with the title track scheduled to release on April 20. The title track was later revealed to be "RedRed" and was released along with its music video on April 20, with the track using the colors green and red showing what the group likes and dislikes.

The extended play was released alongside the music video for "TNT" on May 4. On May 10, a music video teaser for "Acai" was released, before the release of the full music video on May 11.

In an interview with Dazed, the group said that they did not want the album to be "categorized in a certain genre or sound" and they experimented with "different sounds and textures".

== Music and lyrics ==
The EP blends '90s alternative rock with hip hop and EDM. "TNT" has a trap beat and "RedRed" features 2000s electroclash. "Acai", inspired from the acai bowls the members ate every day, shows the determination of the members to be "great without toppings". "YoungCreatorCrew" is based on a freestyle rap by the members on their debut day where the phrase becomes "a chant, a joke and a self-description". "Wassup" depicts the group's travel with a mid-tempo arrangement. "Blue Lips", featuring a "warm" keyboard line and low-register vocals, is about pain that the journey to achieve a dream inevitably causes.

== Critical reception ==
Professional ratings
Review scores
Source	Rating
AllMusic	4/5 stars
IZM	2/5 stars
Overtone	3.1/5

Matt Collar of AllMusic rated the EP 4 out of 5 stars. He wrote that the EP is "inventive" and "high-energy" with the members further embracing a "distinctive" sound.

Critics of Overtone rated the EP an average of 3.1 out of 5 stars. They wrote that although similarities with ASAP Rocky and Frank Ocean and the frivolity of "YoungCreatorCrew" are weaknesses, it is remarkable that the group emphasizes their individuality.

On the other hand, Han Seong-hyeon of IZM rated the EP 2 out of 5 stars. He wrote that Cortis does not deviate from industry standards although they claim to be different from K-pop.

== Track listing ==
GreenGreen track listing
No.	Title	Writer(s)	Producers	Length
1.	"TNT"	Hiss Noise; Martin; Supreme Boi; Thom Bridges; Slush Puppy; Zach Fogarty; Golden Landis Von Jones; Juhoon; "Hitman" Bang; Keonho; Seonghyeon	Hiss Noise; Supreme Boi; Thom Bridges; Slush Puppy; Zach Fogarty	2:02
2.	"RedRed"	Hiss Noise; "Hitman" Bang; Martin; Jasper Harris; Skillies; Seonghyeon; Keonho; Skai; James; Juhoon; Derrick Milano; Jacob Aaron (The Hub)	Hiss Noise; Supreme Boi; "Hitman" Bang; Jasper Harris; Skillies; Skai	2:43
3.	"Acai"	Hiss Noise; Martin; Supreme Boi; Seonghyeon; Synthetic; Venny; Keonho; Juhoon; James; Lewis Donte Shoates; "Hitman" Bang; Showjoe; Elijah Noll; Jonathan Yoni Laham	Hiss Noise; Martin; Supreme Boi; Seonghyeon; Synthetic; Venny; "Hitman" Bang	2:53
4.	"YoungCreatorCrew"	Hiss Noise; Martin; Supreme Boi; Seonghyeon; Keonho; Nami; Juhoon; James	Hiss Noise; Martin; Supreme Boi	2:56
5.	"Wassup"	Hiss Noise; Martin; Supreme Boi; Savesomeone; Juhoon; Sean Cook; Nami; Seonghyeon; "Hitman" Bang; James; Keonho	Hiss Noise; Supreme Boi; Savesomeone; Sean Cook; "Hitman" Bang	3:04
6.	"Blue Lips"	Martin; Kirsten Allyssa Spencer	Hiss Noise; Martin; Supreme Boi	2:21
Total length:				16:03

GreenGreen_playextended track listing
No.	Title	Writer(s)	Producers	Length
7.	"Pack It Up"	Supreme Boi; Hiss Noise; Martin; Seonghyeon; Keonho; Juhoon; James	Supreme Boi; Hiss Noise	1:52
8.	"MoneyMoneyMoney"	Supreme Boi; Hiss Noise; Hector Delgado; Seonghyeon; Martin; James; Juhoon; Keonho; Lawson	Supreme Boi; Hiss Noise; Hector Delgado	2:19
Total length:				20:14

== Charts ==
=== Weekly charts ===
Weekly chart performance for GreenGreen
Chart (2026)	Peak position
Australian Albums (ARIA)	60
Austrian Albums (Ö3 Austria)	7
Belgian Albums (Ultratop Flanders)	5
Belgian Albums (Ultratop Wallonia)	3
Croatian International Albums (HDU)	3
Dutch Albums (Album Top 100)	65
French Albums (SNEP)	5
German Albums (Offizielle Top 100)	11
Greek Albums (IFPI)	24
Hungarian Albums (MAHASZ)	28
Italian Albums (FIMI)	98
Japanese Albums (Oricon)	2
Japanese Combined Albums (Oricon)	2
Japanese Hot Albums (Billboard Japan)	4
Lithuanian Albums (AGATA)	30
Polish Albums (ZPAV)	7
South Korean Albums (Circle)	1
Slovak Albums (ČNS IFPI)	40
Swedish Physical Albums (Sverigetopplistan)	5
Swiss Albums (Schweizer Hitparade)	19
UK R&B Albums (Official Charts)	6
UK Singles Sales (OCC)	2
US Billboard 200	3
US World Albums (Billboard)	1

=== Monthly charts ===
Monthly chart performance for GreenGreen
Chart (2026)	Peak position
Japanese Albums (Oricon)	4
South Korean Albums (Circle)	1

== Certifications ==
Certifications for GreenGreen
Region	Certification	Certified units/sales
Japan (RIAJ)	Gold	100,000^{^}
South Korea (KMCA)	2× Million	2,000,000^{^}
South Korea (KMCA) Weverse Albums	3× Platinum	750,000^{^}
^{^} Shipments figures based on certification alone.
