= MAMA Award for Song of the Year =

South Korean music award

- Awarded for: Top track of the year
- Country: South Korea
- Presented by: Mnet
- First award: 2006
- Currently held by: Cortis – "RedRed" (2026)

Highlights
- Most wins: Twice, BTS (3)
- Most nominations: IU, BTS (6)
- Website: Official website

The MAMA Award for Song of the Year (Korean: 올해의 노래상; RR: Olhaeui noraesang) is an honor presented at the annual MAMA Awards, a South Korean awards ceremony presented by Mnet. One of the event's most prestigious daesang (or grand prize) awards, it was first awarded during the ceremony's eighth edition in 2006—then titled the Mnet KM Music Festival. Having gone through various name changes since its inaugural ceremony in 1999, it was renamed the Mnet Asian Music Awards from 2009 until it was rebranded as the MAMA Awards in 2022.

Before 2021, the judging criteria for the award consisted a breakdown of 20% online voting, 40% expert evaluation, 30% digital sales, and 10% record sales. However, prior to the announcement of the 2021 ceremony nominations, it was revealed that online fan voting would be removed from consideration. As of 2022, the judging criteria for the award consists of 40% judges panel evaluation and 60% digital song downloads and streaming (40% from South Korea and 20% global).

The Song of the Year award was first presented to vocal group SG Wannabe for "Partner for Life" in 2006, where they also won Album of the Year for the single's parent album The 3rd Masterpiece. Twice and BTS currently holds the distinction for the most awarded artists overall in the category, having both won the prize three times. Two artists have the second-most wins with two each: BigBang (2007, 2015), and 2NE1 (2009, 2011). IU and BTS have the most shortlisted nominations in the category, with six each.

== Winners and nominees ==
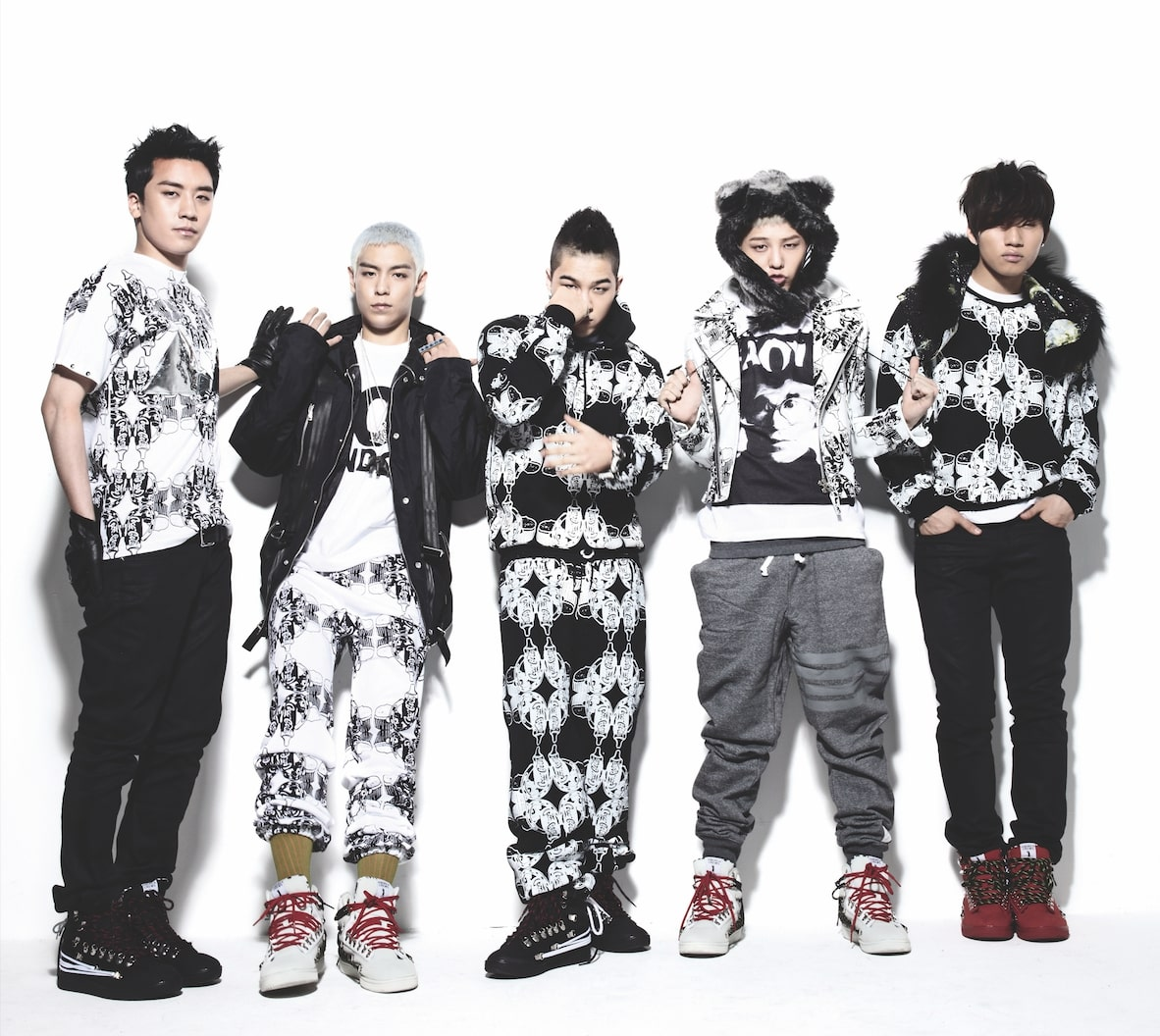
BigBang received the award twice, in 2007 for "Lies" and in 2015 for "Bang Bang Bang". Member Taeyang won for "Eyes, Nose, Lips" in 2014.

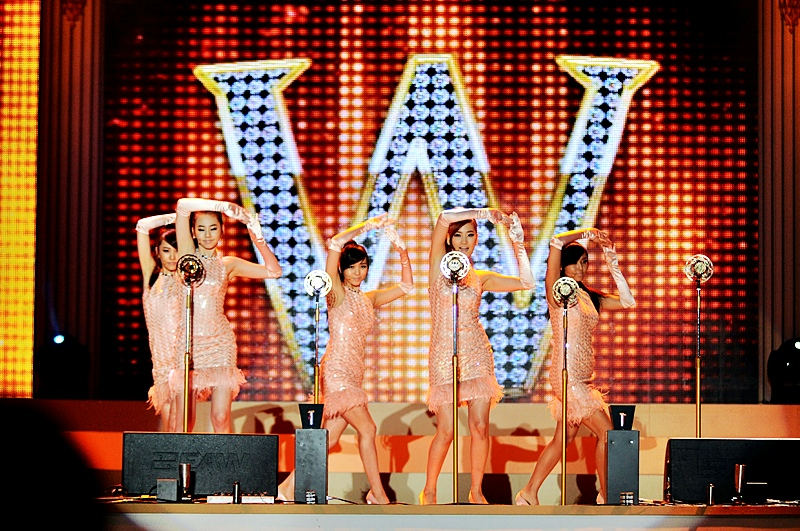
2008 winner for "Nobody", Wonder Girls

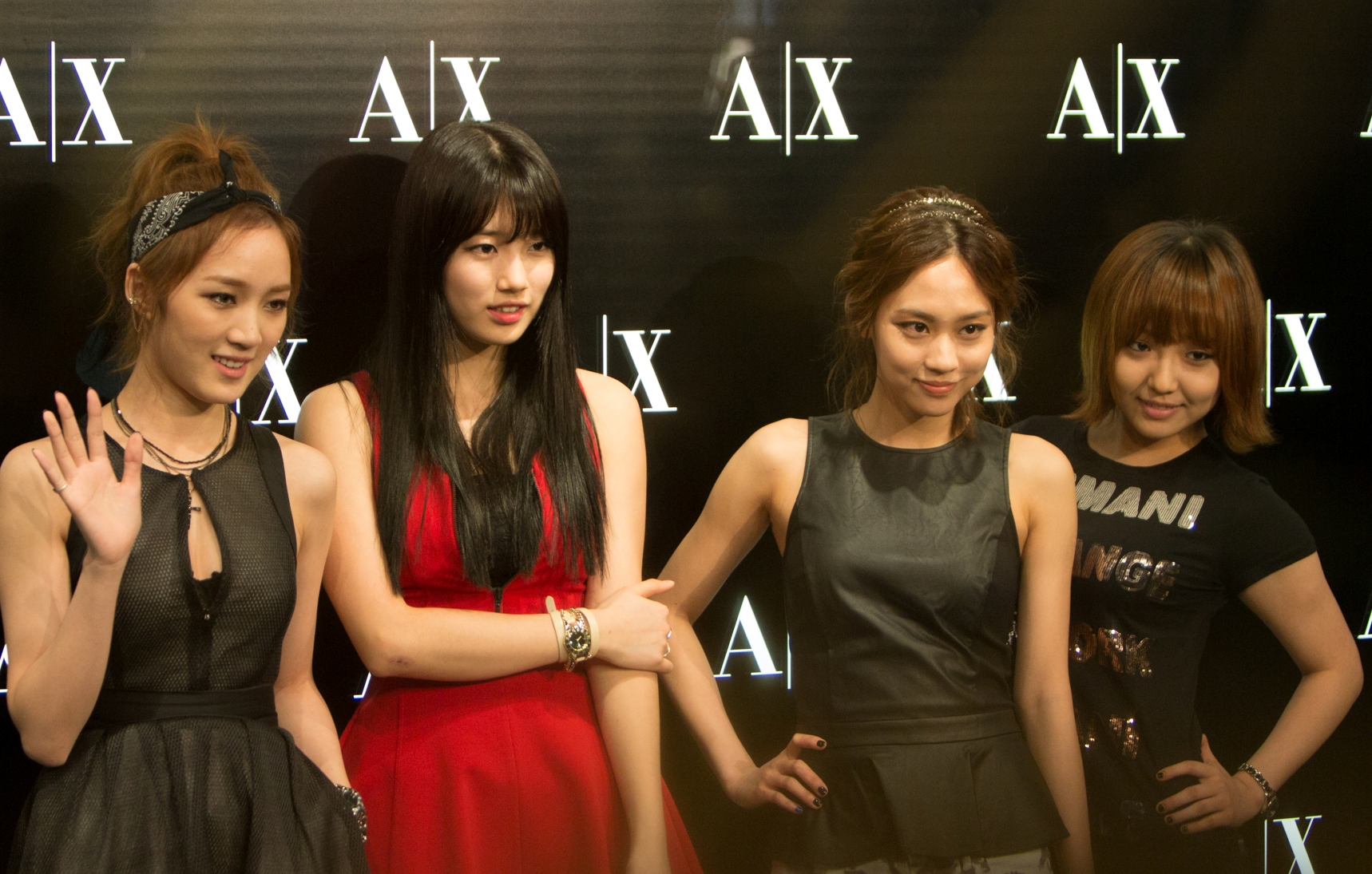
2010 winner for "Bad Girl Good Girl", Miss A

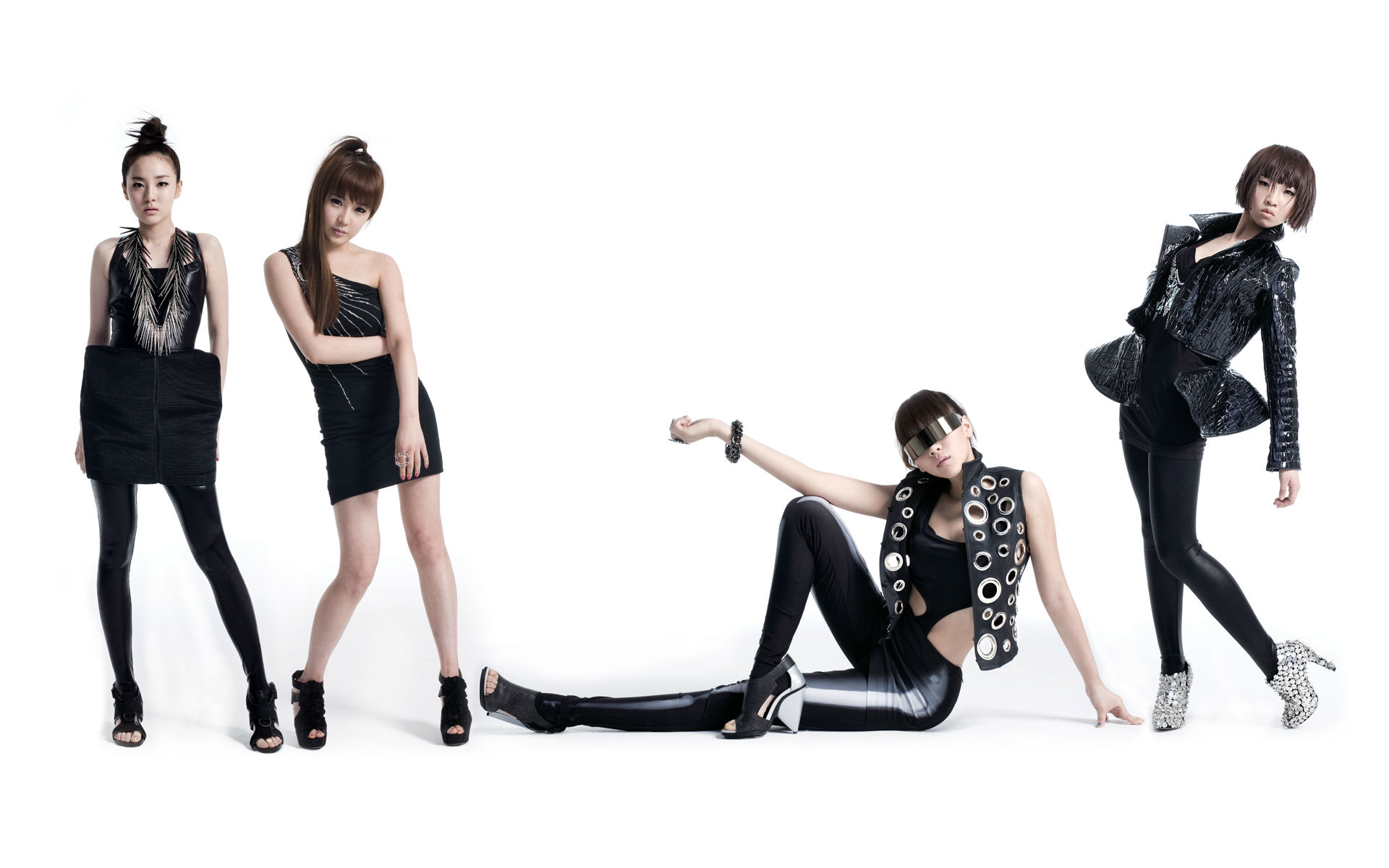
Two-time award winner 2NE1, winning in 2009 for "I Don't Care" and in 2011 for "I Am the Best"

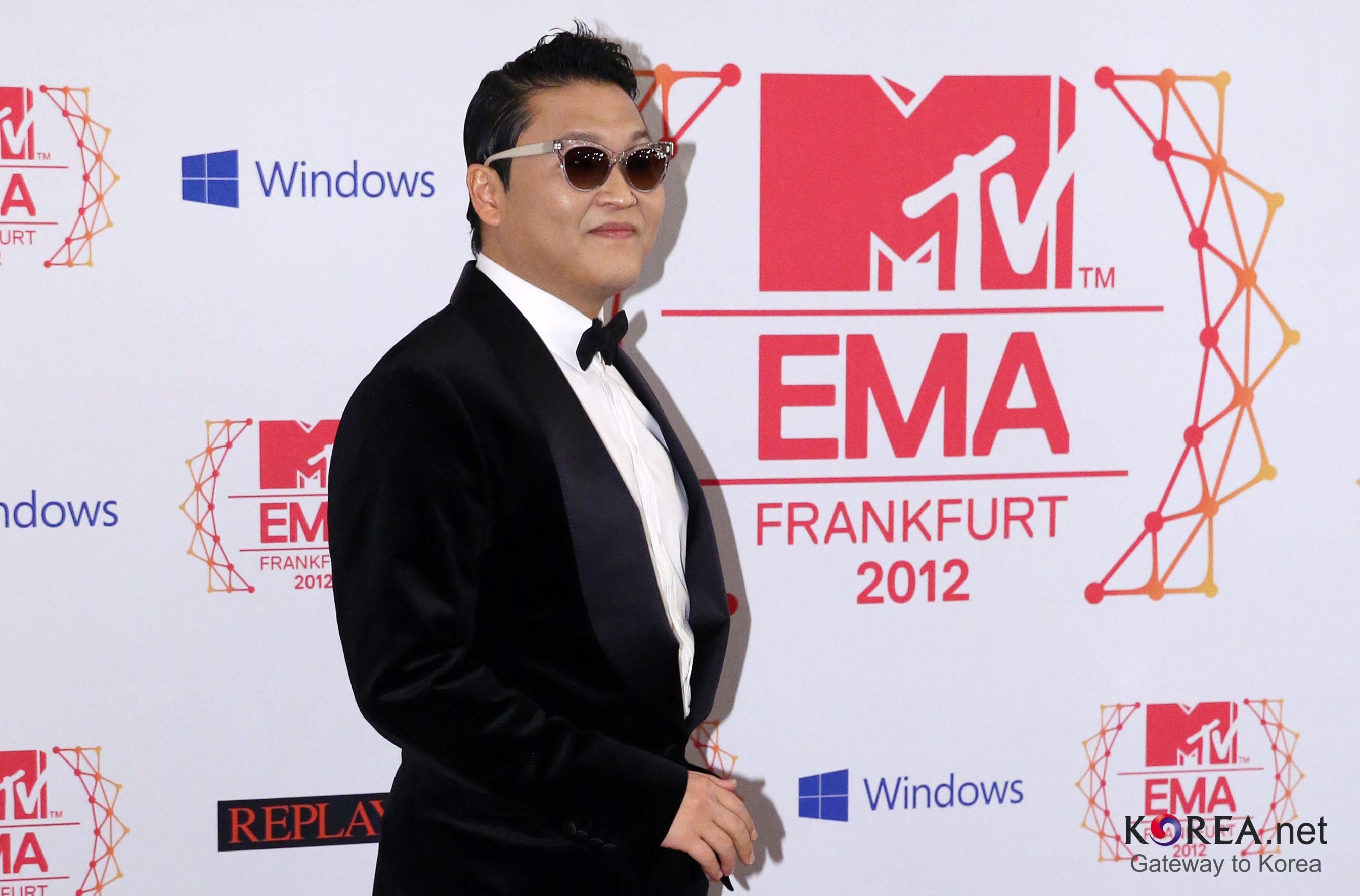
2012 recipient Psy, winning for "Gangnam Style"

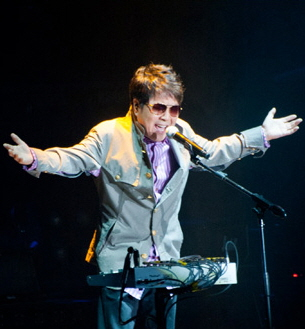
2013 winner for "Bounce", Cho Yong-pil

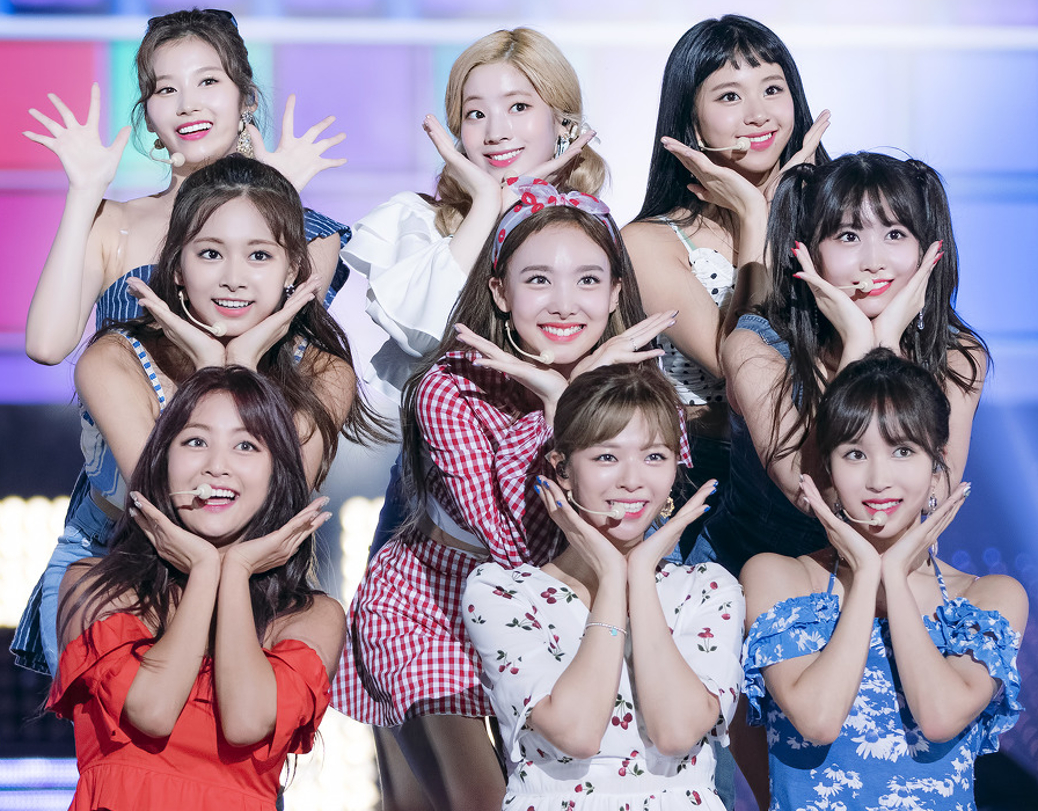
Three-time award winner Twice has tied as the highest awarded act, winning in 2016, 2017 and 2018

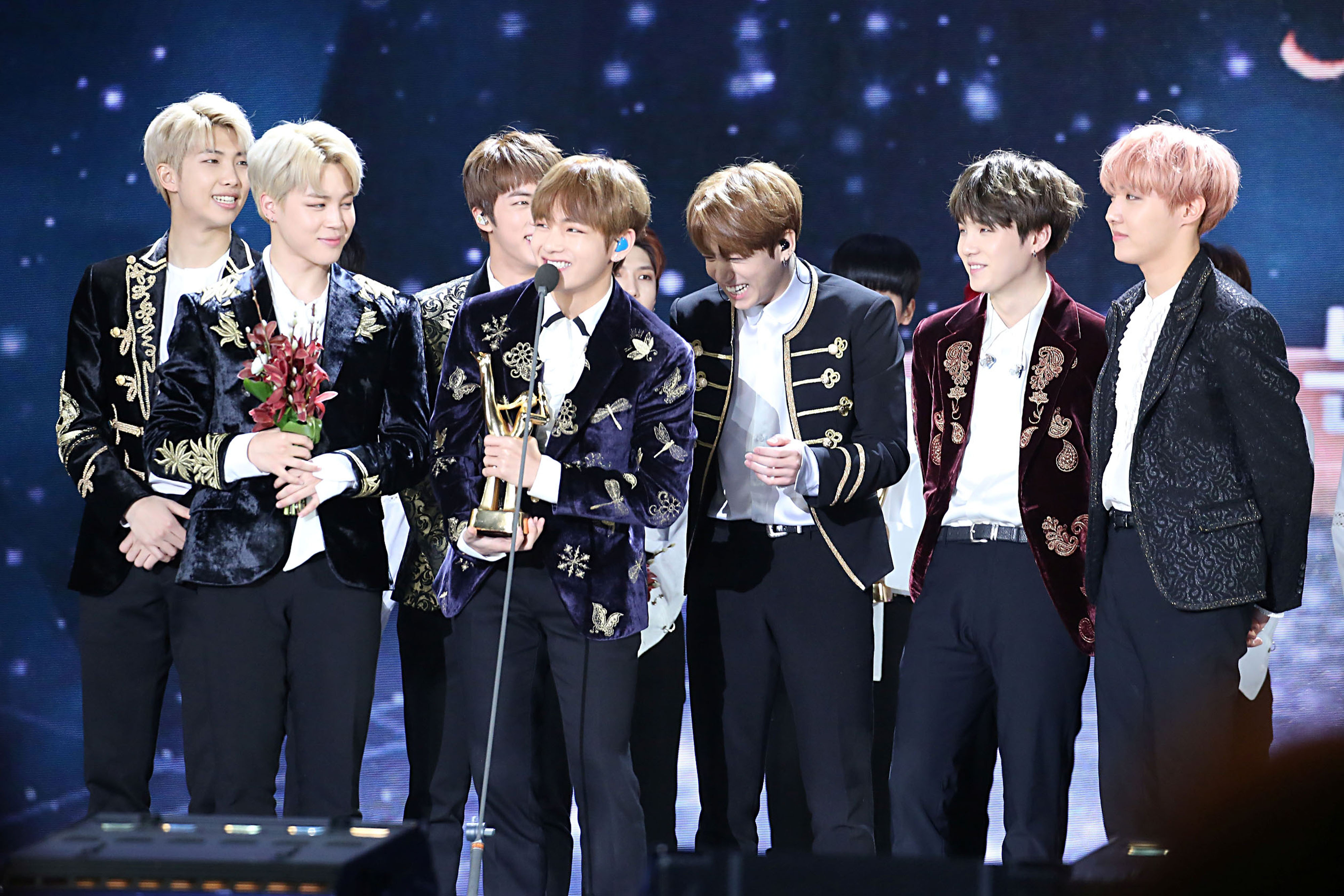
Three-time award winner BTS, winning for "Boy with Luv" (2019), "Dynamite" (2020) and "Butter" (2021)

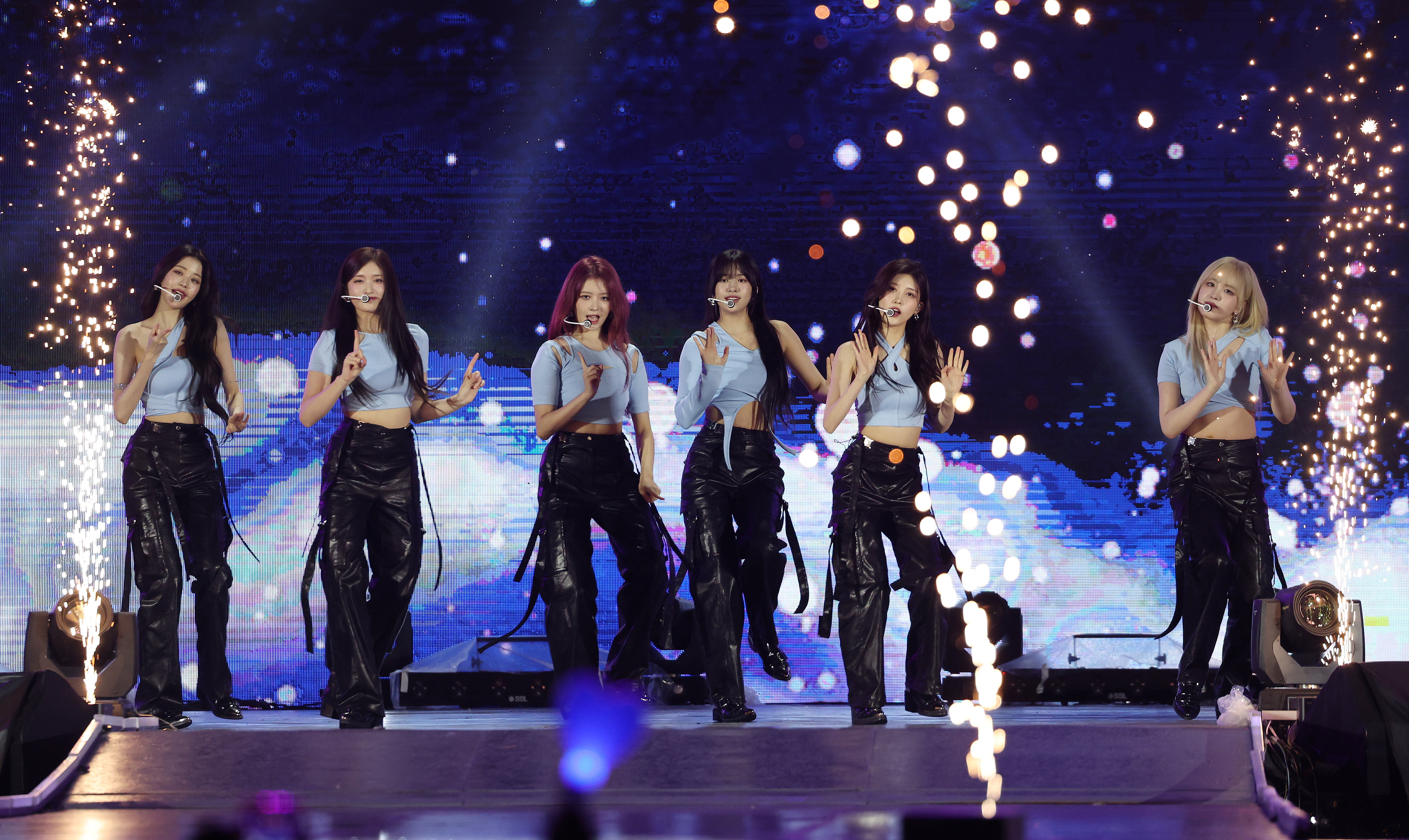
2022 winner for "Love Dive", Ive

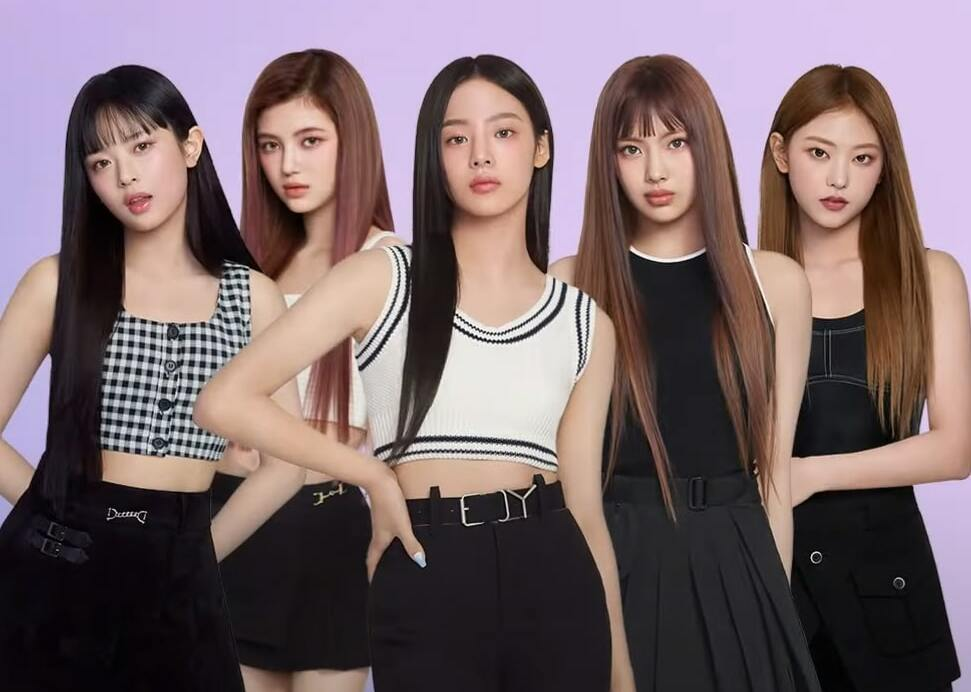
2023 winner for "Ditto", NewJeans

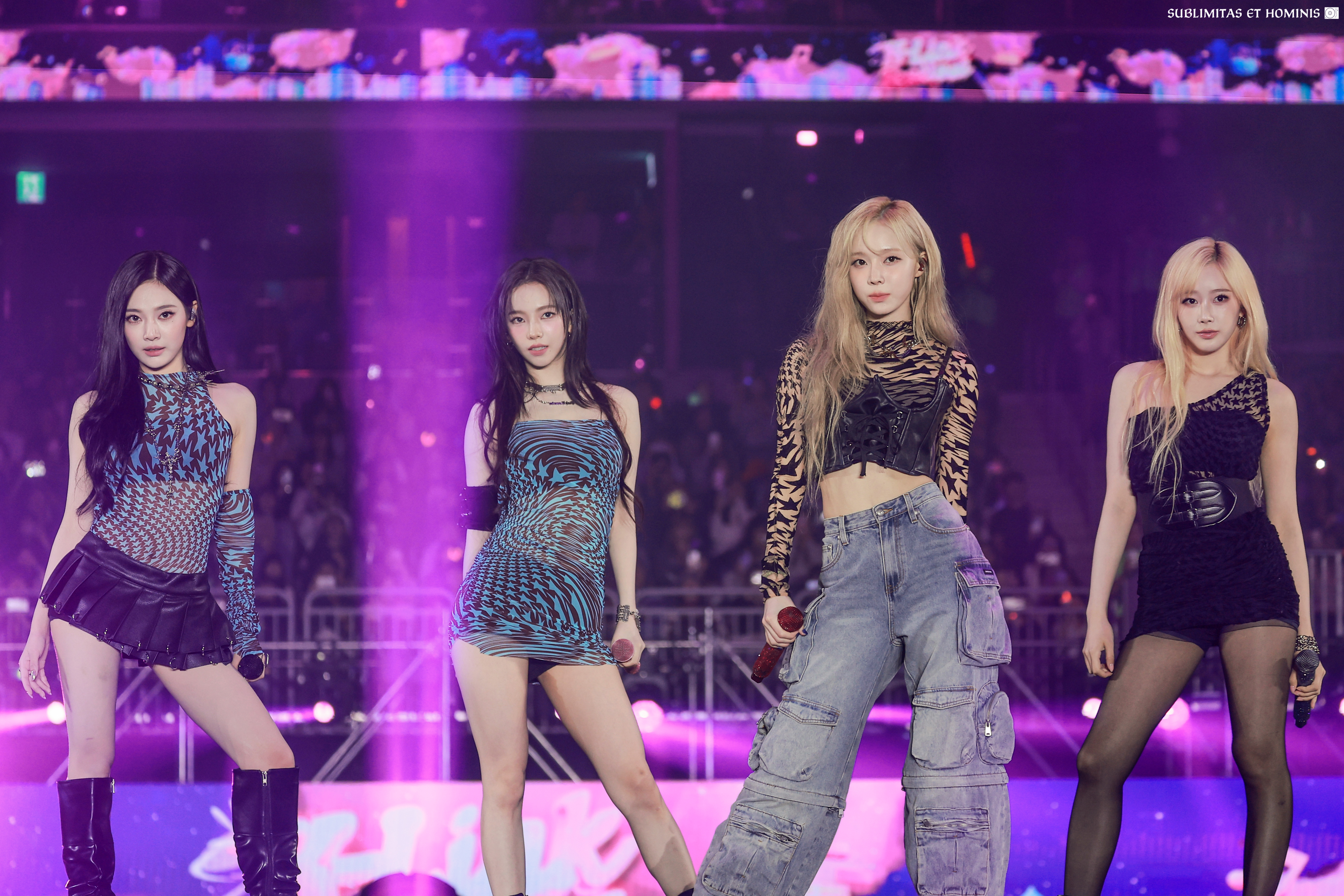
2024 winner for "Supernova", Aespa

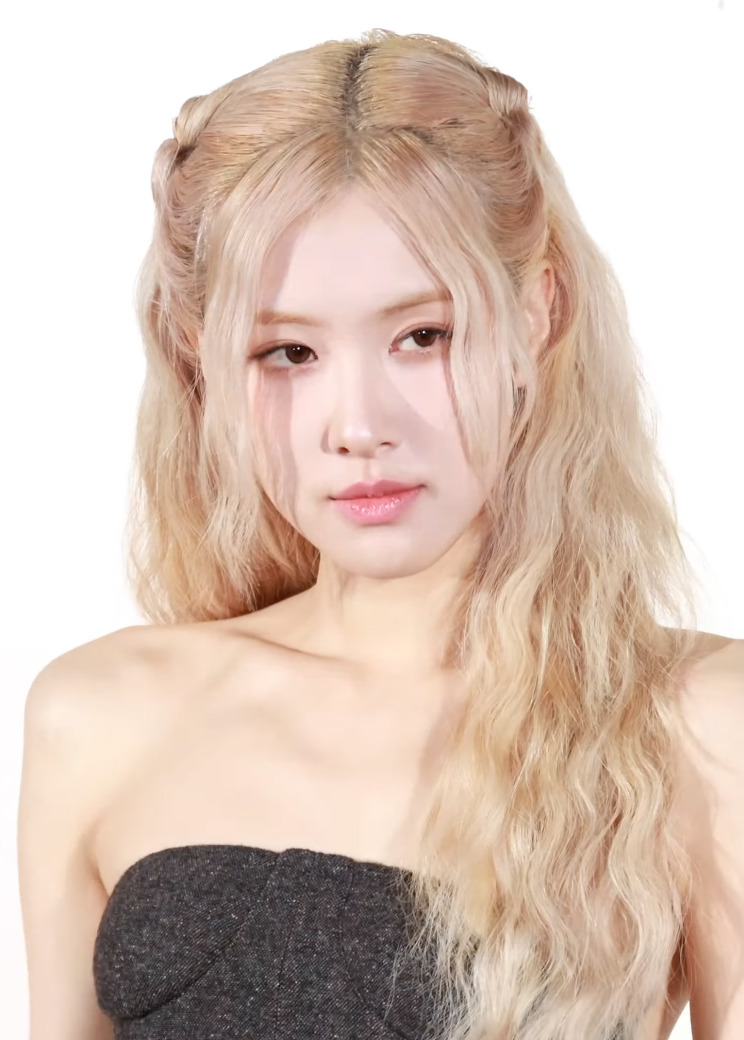
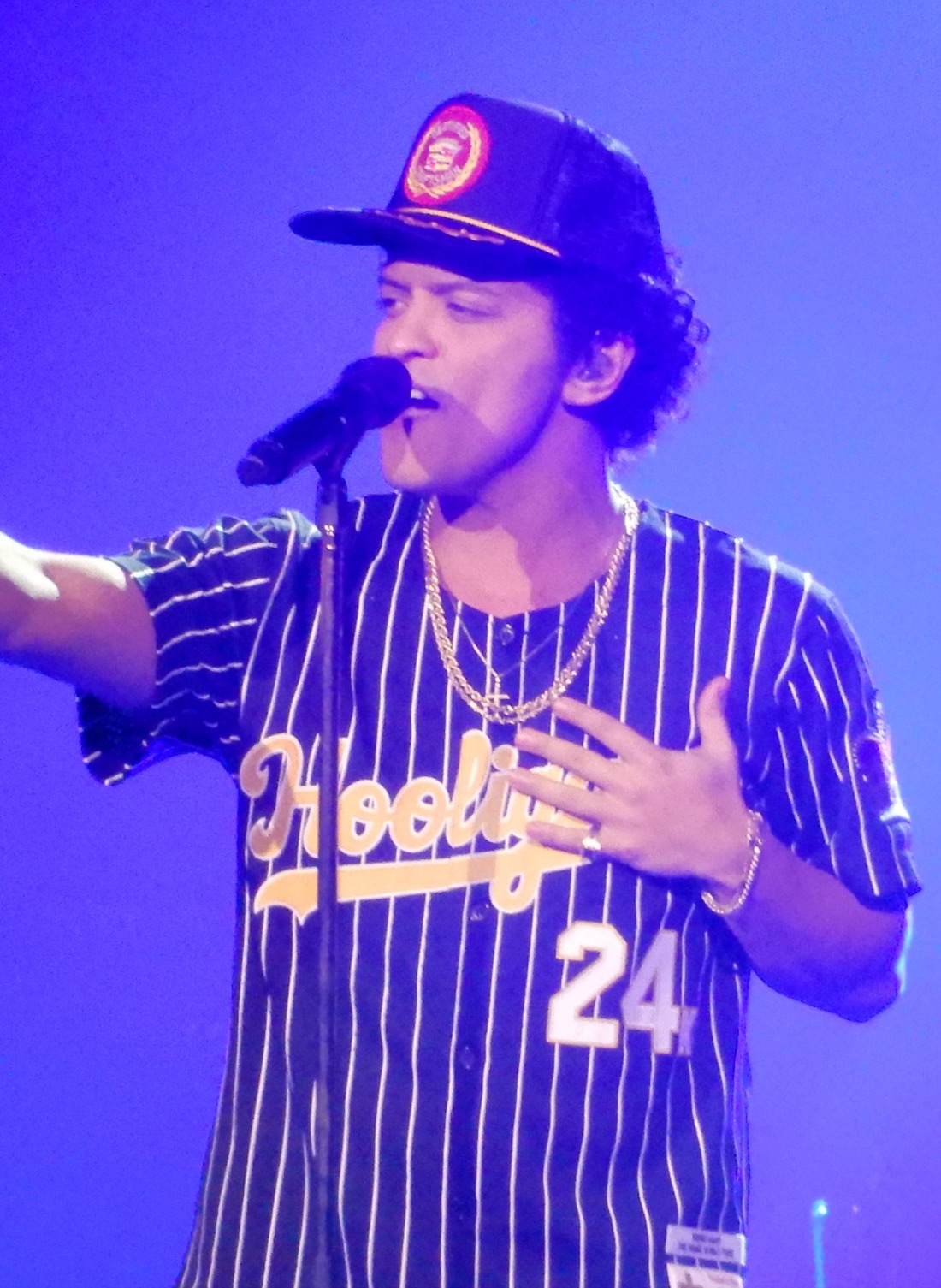
2025 winner for "APT.", Rosé and Bruno Mars

=== 2000s ===
Year	Winner(s)	Winning song	Nominee(s) (Note: Each year's song category nominees are automatically nominated.)	Ref.
2006 (8th)	SG Wannabe	"Partner for Life"	Baek Ji-young – "I Won't Love"; Buzz – "You Don't Know Man"; TVXQ – "'O'-Jung.Ban.Hap."; Vibe – "That Man, That Woman"	
2007 (9th)	BigBang	"Lies"	Epik High – "Fan"; Ivy – "Sonata of Temptation"; SG Wannabe – "Arirang"; Yangpa – "Love... What Is It?"	
2008 (10th)	Wonder Girls	"Nobody"	BigBang – "Haru Haru"; Epik High – "One" (feat. Ji Sun); Lee Hyori – "U-Go-Girl"; TVXQ – "Mirotic"	
2009 (11th)	2NE1	"I Don't Care"	Initial nominees: 2NE1 – "Fire"; 2PM – "Again & Again"; Girls' Generation – "Gee"; Super Junior – "Sorry, Sorry"; Brown Eyed Girls – "Abracadabra"; Kara – "Honey"; G-Dragon – "Heartbreaker"; Son Dam-bi – "Saturday Night"; Clazziquai – "Love Again"; Seo Taiji – "Juliet"; DnG – "Step 2 Me"; Leessang – "Girl Who Can't Break Up, Guy Who Can't Leave" (ft. Jung-in); Bada – "Mad"; SS501 – "Because I'm Stupid"; Baek Ji-young – "Don't Forget"; Lee Seung-chul – "No More Love Like This"; T-max – "Paradise"; Tiffany – "I'm Alone"; 4Minute – "Muzik"; Kim Tae-woo – "Love Rain"; Kim Jong-kook – "Today More Than Yesterday"; Bobby Kim – "Love... That Guy"; Park Hyo-shin – "After Love"; Baek Ji-young – "Like Being Shot By A Bullet"; Hong Jin-young – "Love Battery"; Seong Jin-yoo – "Fit Perfectly"; Park Hyun-bin – "Brilliant Life"; Wink – "Embarrassed"; Joo Hyun-mi & Seohyun – "Jjarajajja"; Dynamic Duo – "Guilty"; Tiger JK – "Monster"; Outsider – "Loner"; Epik High – "Wannabe" (ft. Mellow); Boohwal – "Thought"; Kiha & The Faces – "Living Without Incidents"; Cherry Filter – "Pianissimo"; F.T. Island – "I Wish"	

=== 2010s ===
Year	Winner(s)	Winning song	Nominee(s)	Ref.
2010 (12th)	Miss A	"Bad Girl Good Girl"	2AM – "Can't Let You Go Even If I Die"; 2NE1 – "Can't Nobody"; 2PM – "I'll Be Back"; DJ Doc – "I'm This Kind of Person"	
2011 (13th)	2NE1	"I Am the Best"	Baek Ji-young – "That Woman"; Beast – "Fiction"; IU – "Good Day"; Leessang – "Turned off the TV"; Initial nominees: Kim Gun-mo – "Sadder Than Yesterday"; Kim Hyun-joong – "Break Down"; Davichi – "Don't Say Goodbye"; TVXQ – "Keep Your Head Down"; 4Men – "Once While Living"; Hyuna – "Bubble Pop"; Tablo – "Bad"; T-ara – "Roly Poly"; Mighty Mouth – "Tok Tok"; Jay Park – "Abandoned"; BigBang – "Tonight"; Girls' Generation – "The Boys"; Super Junior – "Mr. Simple"; Secret – "Shy Boy"; Sistar19 – "Ma Boy"; MBLAQ – "Mona Lisa"; Lee Hyun – "You're the Best of My Life"; Infinite – "Be Mine"; Yim Jae-beom – "Love" (City Hunter); Jaurim – "Idol"; Kiha & The Faces – "Just Know Each Other"; Jang Woo-hyuk – "Time is (L)over"; Clover – "La Vida Loca"; Taeyeon – "I Love You"; Huh Gak – "Hello"; 2AM – "YWAC"; CNBLUE – "Intuition"; F.T. Island – "Hello Hello"; G.NA – "Black & White"; K.Will – "My Heart is Beating"; Miss A – "Goodbye Baby"; Simon D – "Cheerz"; YB – "Find the Dream Breaker"	
2012 (14th)	Psy	"Gangnam Style"	Initial nominees: Busker Busker – "Cherry Blossom Ending"; IU – "You & I"; Sistar – "Alone"; Super Junior – "Sexy, Free & Single"; 10cm – Fine Thank You and You"; 2AM – "I Wonder If You Hurt Like Me"; 4Minute – "Volume Up"; CNBLUE – "Hey You"; FT Island – "Severely"; f(x) – "Electric Shock"; K.Will – "I Need You"; Miss A – "Touch"; Nell – "The Day Before"; Noel – "I Miss You"; Davichi – "Will Think of You"; Dynamic Duo – "Without You"; LeeSsang – "Someday"; Mighty Mouth – "Bad Boy"; JYP – "You're the One"; Baek Ji Young – "Voice"; Verbal Jint – "You Deserve Better"; BoA – "Only One"; B2ST – "Beautiful Night"; Shinee – "Sherlock (Clue + Note)"; Seo In Young – "Let′s Dance"; Secret – "Poison"; Urban Zakapa – "I Hate You"; Epik High – "Up"; MBLAQ – "This is War"; Infinite – "The Chaser"; John Park – "Falling"; 4Men – "The Man, the Woman"; Huh Gak – "The Person Who Once Loved Me"; Hyuna – "Ice Cream"	
2013 (15th)	Cho Yong-pil	"Bounce"	Busker Busker – "First Love"; Crayon Pop – "Bar Bar Bar"; Girls' Generation – "I Got a Boy"; Psy – "Gentleman"; Initial nominees: 2AM – "One Spring Day"; B1A4 – "What's Happening?"; CNBLUE – "I'm Sorry"; Exo – "Growl"; G-Dragon – "Crooked"; G.NA – "Oops!"; MFBTY – "Sweet Dream"; Girl's Day – "Expect"; Geeks – "Wash Away"; Nell – "Ocean Of Light"; Davichi – "Turtle"; Dynamic Duo – "BAAAM"; DickPunks – "Viva Primavera"; Lyn – "Breakable Heart"; Jay Park – "Joah"; Baechigi – "Shower Of Tears"; Verbal Jint – "If It Ain't Love"; Beast – "Shadow"; Shinee – "Dream Girl"; Seo In-young – "Please Love Me"; Sunmi – "24 Hours"; Seungri – "Gotta Talk To You"; Sistar – "Give It To Me"; CL – "The Baddest Female"; IU – "The Red Shoes"; Yang Yoseob – "Caffeine"; Ailee – "U&I"; Lee Seung-gi – "Return"; Lee Seung-chul – "My Love"; Lee Hi – "1,2,3,4"; Lee Hyori – "Bad Girls"; Infinite – "Man In Love"; Jaurim – "Twenty Five, Twenty One"; K.Will – "Love Blossom"; 4Minute – "What's Your Name?"	
2014 (16th)	Taeyang	"Eyes, Nose, Lips"	Exo – "Overdose"; Girl's Day – "Something"; IU – "Friday"; Sistar – "Touch My Body"; Initial nominees: 4Minute – "Whatcha Doin' Today"; Ailee – "Don't Touch Me"; Ailee – "My Singing Got Better"; AOA – "Miniskirt"; Baek Ji-young – "Fervor"; BTS – "Boy In Luv"; CNBLUE – "Can't Stop"; Epik High – "Happen Ending"; F.T. Island – "Madly"; Gaeko – "No Make Up"; Gary – "Shower Later"; Huh Gak and Eunji – "Break Up to Make Up"; Hyolyn – "One Way Love"; Hyuna – "Red"; Infinite – "Last Romeo"; Jung-in and Gary– "Your Scent"; Jung Joon-young – "Teenager"; Kim Dong-ryool – "How I Am"; K.Will – "Day 1"; Lee Sun-hee – "Meet Him Among"; Mad Clown – "Without You"; Miss A – "Hush"; Nell – "Four Times Around The Sun"; Rain – "30 Sexy"; Roy Kim – "Home"; San E – "Body Language"; San E and Raina – "A Midsummer Night's Sweetness"; Seo In-guk and Zia – "Loved You"; Seo Taiji – "Christmalo.win"; Soyou and Jung GiGo – "Some"; Sunmi – "Full Moon"; TVXQ – "Something"; VIXX – "Eternity"; Wheesung – "Night And Day"; Younha – "Umbrella"	
2015 (17th)	BigBang	"Bang Bang Bang"	Exo – "Call Me Baby"; Park Jin-young – "Who's Your Mama?"; Taeyeon – "I"; Zion.T – "Eat"; Initial nominees: AOA – "Heart Attack"; CNBLUE – "Cinderella"; EXID – "Ah Yeah"; F.T. Island – "Pray"; Gary – "Get Some Air"; Got7 – "If You Do"; SG Wannabe – "Love You"; Zion.T & Crush – "Just"; Ga In – "Paradise Lost"; Girl's Day – "Ring My Bell"; Kyuhyun – "At Gwanghwamun"; Nell – "Green Nocturne"; Niel – "Lovekiller"; Davichi – "Two Lovers"; Dok2 – "I Will"; Red Velvet – "Ice Cream Cake"; Mamamoo – "Um Oh Ah Yeh"; Mad Clown – "Fire"; Jay Park – "Mommae"; Baek Ah Yeon – "Shouldn't Have"; Block B Bastarz – "Zero for Conduct"; VIXX – "Love Equation"; VIXX LR – "Beautiful Liar"; San E – "Me You"; Shinee – "View"; Soyou & Kwon Jung Yeol – "Lean on Me"; Sistar – "Shake It"; Ailee – "Mind Your Own Business"; Amber – "Shake that Brass"; Infinite – "Bad"; Infinite H – "Pretty"; Im Chang Jung – "Love Again"; JJY Band – "OMG"; 4Minute – "Crazy"; Huh Gak – "Snow of April"; Hyukoh – "Comes and Goes"; Hyuna – "Roll Deep"	
2016 (18th)	Twice	"Cheer Up"	BTS – "Blood Sweat & Tears"; Exo – "Monster"; GFriend – "Rough"; Zico – "I Am You, You Are Me"; Initial nominees: 10cm – "What The Spring??"; AOA – "Good Luck"; CNBLUE – "You're So Fine"; DAY6 – "Letting Go"; Dean – "D (Half Moon)"; FTISLAND – "Take Me Now"; GOT7 – "Hard Carry"; MOBB (Mino & Bobby) – "HIT ME"; Gary – "Lonely Night"; Guckkasten – "Pulse"; DAVICHI – "Beside Me"; DOK2 – "1llusion"; Red velvet – "Russian Roulette"; Luna – "Free Somebody"; MAMAMOO – "You're the Best"; MONSTA X – "All In"; Park Kyung & Eunha – "Inferiority Complex"; Baek A-yeon – "So-So"; Baek Yerin – "Across The Universe"; BoA & Beenzino – "No Matter What"; BEAST – "Ribbon"; BTOB – "Remember That"; VIXX – "Fantasy"; San E & Mad Clown – "Sour Grapes"; Seventeen – "Pretty U"; Suzy & Baekhyun – "Dream"; Sistar – "I Like That"; C Jamm& BewhY – "Puzzle"; Urban Zakapa – "I Don't Love You"; Eric Nam – "Good For You"; Eric Nam & Wendy – "Spring Love"; Ailee – "If You"; Im Chang-jung – "The Love That I Committed"; Jang Beom June – "Fallen in Love (Only with You)"; Jun Hyoseong – "Find Me"; Jung Eun-ji – "Hopefully Sky"; Crush – "Don't Forget" featuring Taeyeon; Taemin – "Press Your Number"; Taeyeon – "Rain"; Tiffany – "I Just Wanna Dance"; HyunA – "How's This?"	
2017 (19th)	Twice	"Signal"	Exo – "Ko Ko Bop"; Heize – "You, Clouds And Rain"; IU – "Through the Night"; Red Velvet – "Red Flavor"; Initial nominees: NCT 127 – "Cherry Bomb"; Monsta X – "Beautiful"; BTS – "DNA"; VIXX – "Shangri-La"; Seventeen – "Don't Wanna Cry"; Buzz – "The Love"; Hyukoh – "TOMBOY"; CNBLUE – "Between Us"; Day6 – "I Smile"; F.T. Island – "Wind"; Girls' Generation – "Holiday"; GFriend – "Love Whisper"; Apink – "Five"; Taemin – "Move"; Hyuna- "Babe"; Sunmi – "Gashina"; Psy – "New Face"; Lee Hyori – "Black"; IU & Oh Hyuk – "Can't Love You Anymore"; Hyolyn & Changmo – "Blue Moon"; Dynamic Duo & Chen – "Nosedive"; Jay Park & Dok2 – "Most Hated"; Soyou & Baekhyun – "Rain"; Zico – "Artist"; Heize – "Don't Know You"; Dean – "Come Over"; Mad Clown – "Lost Without You"; Woo Won-jae – "We Are"; BTOB – "Missing You"; Highlight – "Calling You"; Winner – "Really Really"; Mamamoo – "Yes I am"; Bolbbalgan4 – "Tell Me You Love Me"	
2018 (20th)	Twice	"What Is Love?"	Blackpink – "Ddu-Du Ddu-Du"; BTS – "Fake Love"; iKon – "Love Scenario"; Mamamoo – "Starry Night"; Initial nominees: AOA – "Bingle Bangle"; Bolbbalgan4 – "Travel"; BtoB – "Only One for Me"; Chungha – "Roller Coaster"; Crush – "Bittersweet"; Day6 – "Shoot Me"; Dean – "Instagram"; EXO-CBX – "Blooming Day"; F.T. Island – "Summer Night’s Dream"; Girls’ Generation-Oh!GG – "Lil' Touch"; GOT7 – "Lullaby"; Guckkasten – "Stranger"; Gugudan SeMiNa – "SeMiNa"; Heize – "Didn’t Know Me"; Heize – "Jenga"; Hyukoh – "Love Ya!"; HyunA – "Lip & Hip"; Hyolyn – "Dally" (feat. Gray); Jay Park – "Soju"; Jung Seung-hwan – "The Snowman"; Kiha & The Faces – "Cho Shim"; Im Chang-jung – "There has Never Been a Day I Haven’t Loved You"; Lovelyz – "That Day"; MeloMance – "Tale"; Monsta X – "Shoot Out"; Oh My Girl – "Secret Garden"; Park Hyo-shin – "Sound of Winter"; Pentagon – "Shine"; Red Velvet – "Bad Boy"; Roy Kim – "Only Then"; Seungri – "1, 2, 3!"; Seventeen – "Oh My!"; Seventeen BSS – "Just Do It"; Sunmi – "Siren"; Wanna One – "Boomerang"; Wanna One Triple Position – "Kangaroo"; Zico – "Soulmate" (feat. IU)	
2019 (21st)	BTS	"Boy with Luv" (feat. Halsey)	Blackpink – "Kill This Love"; Chungha – "Gotta Go"; Exo – "Tempo"; Twice – "Fancy"; Initial nominees: AKMU – "How Can I Love the Heartbreak, You're the One I Love"; Ben – "180 Degree"; Blackpink – "Kill This Love"; BOL4 – "Bom"; BtoB – "Beautiful Pain"; BTS – "Boy with Luv"; Changmo – "Band"; Chen – "Beautiful Goodbye"; Chungha – "Gotta Go"; Crush – "Nappa"; Davichi – "Unspoken Words"; Day6 – "Time of Our Life"; Epik High – "Love Drunk"; Exo – "Tempo"; GFriend – "Sunrise"; (G)I-dle – "Senorita"; Got7 – "Eclipse"; Gummy – "Remember Me"; Ha Jin – "We All Lie"; Heize – "She's Fine"; Heize – "We Don’t Talk Together" (feat. Giriboy); Hwasa – "Twit"; Iz*One – "Violeta"; Jang Beom-june – "Karaoke"; Jang Beom-june – "Your Shampoo Scent in the Flowers"; Jang Hye-jin & Yoon Min-soo – "Drunk On Love"; Jannabi – "For Lovers Who Hesitate"; Jannabi – "Take My Hand"; Jennie – "Solo"; Kim Jae-hwan – "Begin Again"; Lee So-ra – "Song Request"; MC the Max – "After You’ve Gone"; Mamamoo – "gogobebe"; Monsta X – "Alligator"; N.Flying – "Rooftop"; Nell – "Let’s Part"; NU'EST – "Bet Bet"; Park Bom – "Spring"; Paul Kim – "So Long"; Red Velvet – "Zimzalabim"; Seventeen – "Fear"; Song Mino – "Fiancé"; Soyou & Ovan – "Rain Drop"; Sunmi – "Lalalay"; Taemin – "Want"; Taeyeon – "Four Seasons"; Twice – "Fancy"; Winner – "Millions"; Woo Won-jae – "Taste"	

=== 2020s ===
Year	Winner(s)	Winning song	Nominee(s)	Ref.
2020 (22nd)	BTS	"Dynamite"	Blackpink – "How You Like That"; Red Velvet – "Psycho"; IU – "Blueming"; Zico – "Any Song"; Initial nominees: Ateez – "Inception"; Baekhyun – "Candy"; Baek Ye-rin – "Here I Am Again"; Baek Ye-rin – "Square (2017)"; BOL4 – "Leo" (feat. Baekhyun); Changmo – "Meteor"; Davichi – "Dear."; Day6 – "Zombie"; Exo – "Obsession"; Gaho – "Start"; Giriboy – "Eul"; Hwasa – "Maria"; Hyukoh – "Help"; Itzy – "Wannabe"; IU – "Eight"; Iz*One – "Secret Story of the Swan"; Jessi – "Nunu Nana"; Jo Jung-suk – "Aloha"; Joy – "Introduce Me a Good Person"; Jung Seung-hwan – "My Christmas Wish"; Kang Daniel – "Who U Are"; Lee Hi – "Holo"; Leenalchi – "Tiger is Coming"; MC the Max – "Bloom"; Mamamoo – "Hip"; NCT 127 – "Kick It"; N.Flying – "Oh really."; Noel – "Late Night"; NU'EST – "I'm in Trouble"; Oh My Girl – "Nonstop"; Park Jin-young – "When We Disco"; Sandeul – "Slightly Tipsy"; Seventeen – "Left & Right"; Sung Si-kyung & IU – "First Winter"; Sunmi – "pporappippam"; Taemin – "Criminal"; Taeyeon – "Spark"; Twice – "More & More"; TXT – "Can't You See Me?"; Winner – "Hold"; Yumdda – "Amanda" (feat. Simon Dominic); Zico – "Summer Hate" (feat. Rain)	
2021 (23rd)	BTS	"Butter"	Aespa – "Next Level"; Lee Mu-jin – "Traffic Light"; IU – "Celebrity"; Oh My Girl – "Dun Dun Dance"; Initial nominees: 10cm – "Borrow Your Night"; 10cm – "Sleepless in Seoul"; AKMU – "Nakka" (feat. IU); Ash Island – "Melody"; Baekhyun – "Bambi"; Changmo – "GJD"; Cho Jung-seok – "I Like You"; Cho Yu-ree – "Wish"; CNBLUE – "Then, Now and Forever"; Coldplay, BTS – "My Universe"; Davichi – "Just Hug Me"; Day6 – "You Make Me"; Gaeko, Kwon Jin-ah – "I Feel Like"; Heize – "Happen"; Hyolyn, Dasom – "Summer or Summer"; Hyuna – "I'm Not Cool"; Itzy – "In the Morning"; Jannabi – "A thought on an autumn night"; Jessi – "What Type of X"; Lee Mu-jin – "Rain and You"; Lisa – "Lalisa"; Mino – "Run Away"; N.Flying – "Moonshot"; NCT 127 – "Sticker"; NCT Dream – "Hot Sauce"; Rain, Park Jin-young – "Switch to Me"; Red Velvet – "Queendom"; Rosé – "On the Ground"; Seventeen – "Ready to Love"; Shinee – "Don't Call Me"; Somi – "Dumb Dumb"; STAYC – "ASAP"; Stray Kids – "Thunderous"; Taeyeon – "Weekend"; Twice – "Alcohol-Free"; Yang Yo-seob, Jung Eun-ji – "Love Day (2021)"; Yumdda – 9ucci	
2022 (24th)	Ive	"Love Dive"	(G)I-dle – "Tomboy"; Blackpink – "Pink Venom"; BTS – "Yet to Come (The Most Beautiful Moment)"; NewJeans – "Attention"; Initial nominees: 10cm – "Drawer"; 10cm, Big Naughty – "Just 10 centimeters"; Be'O – "Counting Stars" (feat. Beenzino); BigBang – "Still Life"; Big Naughty – "Beyond Love" (feat. 10cm); Crush – "Rush Hour" (feat. J-Hope); Davichi – "Fanfare"; Enhypen – "Polaroid Love"; IU – "Drama"; Jannabi – "Grippin' the Green"; Jaurim – "Stay with Me"; Jay Park – "Ganadara" (feat. IU); Jessi – "Zoom"; J-Hope – "More"; Jimin, Ha Sung-woon – "With You"; Kim Min-seok – "Drunken Confession"; Le Sserafim – "Fearless"; Lee Mu-jin – "When it Snows" (feat. Heize); Lim Young-woong – "Our Blues, Our Life"; Loco, Hwasa – "Somebody!"; Lucy – "Play"; MeloMance – "Love, Maybe"; Nayeon – "Pop!"; NCT 127 – "2 Baddies"; NCT Dream – "Glitch Mode"; Psy – "That That" (prod. & feat. Suga); Red Velvet – "Feel My Rhythm"; Seventeen – "Hot"; Stray Kids – "Maniac"; Sunmi – "Heart Burn"; Taeyeon – "INVU"; The Black Skirts – "My Little Lambs"; Treasure – "Jikjin"; TXT – "Good Boy Gone Bad"; V – "Christmas Tree"; Winner – "I Love U"; Wonstein – "Your Existence"; Woo Won-jae, Meenoi – "Ghosting" (prod. Code Kunst); Xdinary Heroes – "Happy Death Day"; Yena – "Smiley" (feat. Bibi); Zico – "Freak"	
2023 (25th)	NewJeans	"Ditto"	(G)I-dle – "Queencard"; Ive – "I Am"; Jisoo – "Flower"; Jungkook – "Seven" (feat. Latto); Initial nominees: Anne-Marie, Minnie – "Expectations"; Ash Island – "Goodbye" (feat. Paul Blanco); Big Naughty – "Hopeless Romantic" (feat. Lee Su-hyun); Big Naughty – "With Me"; BSS – "Fighting" (feat. Lee Young-ji); BtoB – "Wind and Wish"; BTS – "Take Two"; BTS – "The Planet"; Dawn – "Dear My Light"; Hwasa – "I Love My Body"; J-Hope – "On the Street" (with J. Cole); Jay Park – "Candy" (feat. Zion.T); Jeon Somi – "Fast Forward"; Jihyo – "Killin' Me Good"; Jimin – "Like Crazy"; Kai – "Rover"; Le Sserafim – "Unforgiven" (feat. Nile Rodgers); Lee Chae-yeon – "Knock"; Lee Mu-jin – "Ordinary Confession"; Lim Jae-hyun – "Heaven"; Lim Young-woong – "London Boy"; MC the Max – "Eternity"; MeloMance – "A Shining Day"; NCT 127 – "Ay-Yo"; NCT Dream – "Candy"; Parc Jae-jung – "Let's Say Goodbye"; Paul Kim – "You Remember"; Seventeen – "Super"; STAYC – "Teddy Bear"; Stray Kids – "S-Class"; Taeyang – "Vibe" (feat. Jimin); Taeyong – "Shalala"; Tomorrow X Together – "Goodbye Now"; Tomorrow X Together – "Sugar Rush Ride"; V – "Love Me Again"; Zerobaseone – "In Bloom"; Zior Park – "Christian"	
2024 (26th)	Aespa	"Supernova"	Bibi – "Bam Yang Gang"; IU – "Love Wins All"; Illit – "Magnetic"; NewJeans – "How Sweet"; Initial nominees: (G)I-dle – "Fate"; (G)I-dle – "Super Lady"; AKMU – "Hero"; Aespa – "Armageddon"; Crush – "Love You With All My Heart"; Davichi – "A Very Personal Story"; Day6 – "Welcome to the Show"; Dean – "Die 4 You"; Eclipse (Note: Eclipse is a fictional band from the series Lovely Runner. The song is performed by Byeon Woo-seok as vocalist, Lee Seung-hyub as guitarist, Yang Hyuk as bassist, and Moon Yong-suk as drummer.) – "Sudden Shower"; Enhypen – "Sweet Venom"; GroovyRoom – "Yes or No" (feat. Huh Yunjin & Crush); Hwasa – "Na"; Hyukoh & Sunset Rollercoaster – "Young Man"; Ive – "Baddie"; Ive – "Heya"; Jay Park – "Taxi Blurr" (feat. Natty); Jennie – "You & Me"; Jimin – "Who"; Jungkook – "Standing Next to You"; K.Will – "No Sad Song for My Broken Heart"; Key – "Pleasure Shop"; Le Sserafim – "Crazy"; Le Sserafim – "Easy"; Lee Chang-sub – "Heavenly Fate"; Lee Mu-jin – "Episode"; Lee Young-ji – "Small Girl" (feat. D.O.); Leellamarz – "Boys Like Girls" (feat. Gist & Jayci Yucca); Lim Young-woong – "Warmth"; Lucy – "The Knight Who Can't Die and the Silk Cradle"; N.Flying – "Into You"; Nayeon – "ABCD"; NCT 127 – "Fact Check"; NewJeans – "Supernatural"; Plave – "Way 4 Luv"; QWER – "T.B.H"; Red Velvet – "Cosmic"; Riize – "Impossible"; Riize – "Love 119"; RM – "Lost! "; Roy Kim – "Whenever, Wherever"; Seventeen – "God of Music"; Seventeen – "Maestro"; Stray Kids – "Lalalala"; Sung Si-kyung & Naul – "Even for a moment"; Sunmi – "Balloon in Love"; Taemin – "Guilty"; Taeyeon – "Dream"; Taeyeon – "To. X"; Taeyong – "Tap"; TWS – "Plot Twist"; Yuqi – "Freak"; Zico – "Spot!" (feat. Jennie)	
2025 (27th)	Rosé and Bruno Mars	"APT."	Aespa – "Whiplash"; G-Dragon – "Too Bad" (feat. Anderson .Paak); Huntrix – "Golden"; Jennie – "Like Jennie"; Initial nominees: Aespa – "Dirty Work"; AllDay Project – "Famous"; AllDay Project – "Wicked"; Babymonster – "Drip"; Big Naughty – "Music" (feat. Lee Chan-hyuk); Blackpink – "Jump"; BoyNextDoor – "If I Say, I Love You"; BoyNextDoor – "Never Loved This Way Before"; CNBLUE – "A Sleepless Night"; Cortis – "Go!"; Davichi – "Stitching"; Day6 – "Maybe Tomorrow"; Dayoung – "Body"; Doyoung – "Memory"; Dynamic Duo and Gummy – "Take Care"; Haon – "Skrr" (feat. Giselle); Highlight – "Endless Ending"; Illit – "Cherish (My Love)"; Ive – "Rebel Heart"; J-Hope – "Mona Lisa"; Jennie – "Zen"; Jennie – "ExtraL" (feat. Doechii); Jisoo – "Earthquake"; Kai – "Wait on Me"; Karina – "Up"; Key – "Hunter"; Le Sserafim – "Hot"; Lee Chan-hyuk – "Vivid LaLa Love"; Lee Mu-jin – "Coming of Age Story"; Mark – "1999"; Mark – "Fraktsiya" (feat. Lee Young-ji); Meovv – "Drop Top"; Minnie – "Her"; N.Flying – "Everlasting"; NCT Dream – "When I'm With You"; NCT Wish – "Poppop"; Park Hyo-shin – "Hero"; PH-1 – "Life Is A Movie" (feat. Jung Ji-so); Plave – "Dash"; QWER – "Dear"; Riize – "Fly Up"; Rosé – "Toxic Till the End"; Roy Kim – "If You Ask Me What Love Is"; Saja Boys – "Soda Pop"; Seventeen – "Thunder"; Tablo and RM – "Stop the Rain"; Taeyeon – "Letter to Myself"; Tomorrow X Together – "When the Day Comes"; Treasure – "Yellow"; TWS – "Countdown!"; V and Park Hyo-shin – "Winter Ahead"; Xdinary Heroes – "Beautiful Life"; Zerobaseone – "Doctor! Doctor!"	
2026 (28th)	Cortis	"RedRed"	Aespa – "Lemonade"; BTS – "Swim"; Hearts2Hearts – "Rude!"; Hwasa – "Good Goodbye"; Illit – "It's Me"; I.O.I – "Suddenly"; Ive – "Bang Bang"; Le Sserafim – "Spaghetti" (feat. J-Hope); Nmixx – "Blue Valentine"	

== Artists with multiple wins ==
3 wins

- Twice
- BTS

2 wins

- BigBang (Note: Additionally, 2014 winner Taeyang is a member of BigBang.)
- 2NE1

== Artists with multiple nominations ==
6 nominations

- BTS (Note: Additionally, 2023 nominee Jungkook is a member of BTS.)
- IU

5 nominations

- Exo

4 nominations

- Blackpink (Note: Additionally, 2023 nominee Jisoo and 2025 nominees Rosé and Jennie are members of Blackpink.)
- Twice

3 nominations

- 2NE1
- Aespa
- BigBang
- NewJeans

2 nominations

- (G)I-dle
- Baek Ji-young
- Busker Busker
- Epik High
- Ive
- Psy
- Red Velvet
- Sistar
- TVXQ
- Zico

Note: Shortlisted nominations only

== See also ==
- MAMA Award for Album of the Year
- MAMA Award for Artist of the Year
- MAMA Award for Worldwide Icon of the Year
- Melon Music Award for Song of the Year
