= Cortis =

South Korean boy band

- Cortis in August 2026; L–R: Martin, Juhoon, Seonghyeon, James, and Keonho

Background information
- Origin: Seoul, South Korea
- Genres: K-pop; hip-hop
- Years active: 2025–present
- Labels: BigHit; Republic
- Members: James; Juhoon; Martin; Seonghyeon; Keonho
- Website: cortisofficial.us

Cortis (Korean: 코르티스; stylized in all caps) is a South Korean boy band formed by BigHit Music in 2025. The group consists of five members: James, Juhoon, Martin, Seonghyeon, and Keonho.

BigHit Music's third group after BTS and Tomorrow X Together, Cortis debuted on August 18, 2025 with the single "What You Want". They later released their first extended play, Color Outside the Lines, which debuted at number 15 on the Billboard 200, the second‑highest entry for a K‑pop act's debut album. The EP also set records for first‑day sales and has surpassed two million in cumulative album sales. Their 2026 single "RedRed" became the group's most commercially successful song for far, reaching number one at the Circle Digital Chart. They have won several accolades at the 10th Asia Artist Awards, 2025 MAMA Awards, and 40th Golden Disc Awards.

== Name ==
The logotype of Cortis.

The name "Cortis" is derived from six letters taken from the phrase "Color Outside the Lines". According to the band's agency, the name "symbolizes the band's commitment to thinking freely, unconstrained by the norms and expectations set by society." The group announced their fandom name on Weverse as Coer (Korean: 코어, pronounced as "core"), a blend of the group's name and the word "core", intended to signify fans as the group's support.

== History ==
=== Pre-debut activities and formation ===
Prior to the formation of Cortis, most of the members had prior experience in entertainment, modeling, or music. James was a trainee in BigHit's pre‑debut group Trainee A from 2021 until the group's disbandment in 2022. He contributed to choreography and songwriting for other artists, working on tracks such as "Magnetic", "Cherish (My Love)", and "Tick-Tack" by Illit, and "Deja Vu" and "Miracle" by Tomorrow X Together. He also performed as a backing dancer for Jung Kook's live renditions of "Seven". Martin was a member of the Rainbow Children's Choir and served as a flag bearer for Iceland at the 2018 Winter Olympics before joining BigHit a year later, also contributing as a producer to Illit's "Magnetic"; Le Sserafim's "Pierrot", and Tomorrow X Together's "Deja Vu", "Miracle", and "Beautiful Strangers". Juhoon previously played soccer and worked as a child model, appearing in campaigns for various fashion brands and in music videos including VIXX's "Scientist", Zion.T's "Hello Tutorial" (with Ella Gross, later of Meovv), and MeloMance's "Tale", "You & I", and "Festival". Keonho was previously a competitive swimmer before choosing to join BigHit. Cortis members have no fixed positions with each of them contributing to songwriting, music production, videography, and choreography.

From April to May 2024, the members attended a song camp in Los Angeles, where they collaborated on the production of their debut album. In April 2025, Hybe, BigHit's parent company, announced plans to debut a new boy band in the third quarter of 2025, with an August debut date confirmed in June. The group's members, Martin, James, Juhoon, Seonghyeon, and Keonho, were revealed on July 14, with the group's name disclosed on August 7.

=== 2025–present: Debut with Color Outside the Lines, and GreenGreen ===
On August 11, 2025, Cortis released their pre‑debut single "Go!", alongside its accompanying music video filmed in Los Angeles. They officially debuted with the single "What You Want", featuring choreography performed on treadmills. Four days later, the group released an English version of the song featuring American singer Teezo Touchdown, and performed the track with him on Mnet's M Countdown. They released a trailer for their documentary What We Want on August 30, which documented the production of their debut album in Los Angeles, with the first episode being released on September 1. They released their debut EP, Color Outside the Lines, on September 8, accompanied by the single "Fashion". The music video, filmed in Christchurch, New Zealand, accumulated one million views within 12 hours. Their EP sold approximately 250,000 copies on its first day, setting a new record for first‑day sales by a K‑pop act that debuted in 2025.

In December 2025, Cortis were announced as headliners for the NBA Crossover concert series in February 2026, alongside Ludacris and Shaboozey. That same month, they performed at Tokyo National Stadium for KBS2's 2025 Music Bank Global Festival in Japan, performing "What You Want" and a cover of BTS's "Mic Drop". By the end of the year, Cortis won multiple awards, including Rookie of the Year and Best Performance at the 10th Asia Artist Awards, and Best New Artist at the 2025 MAMA Awards.

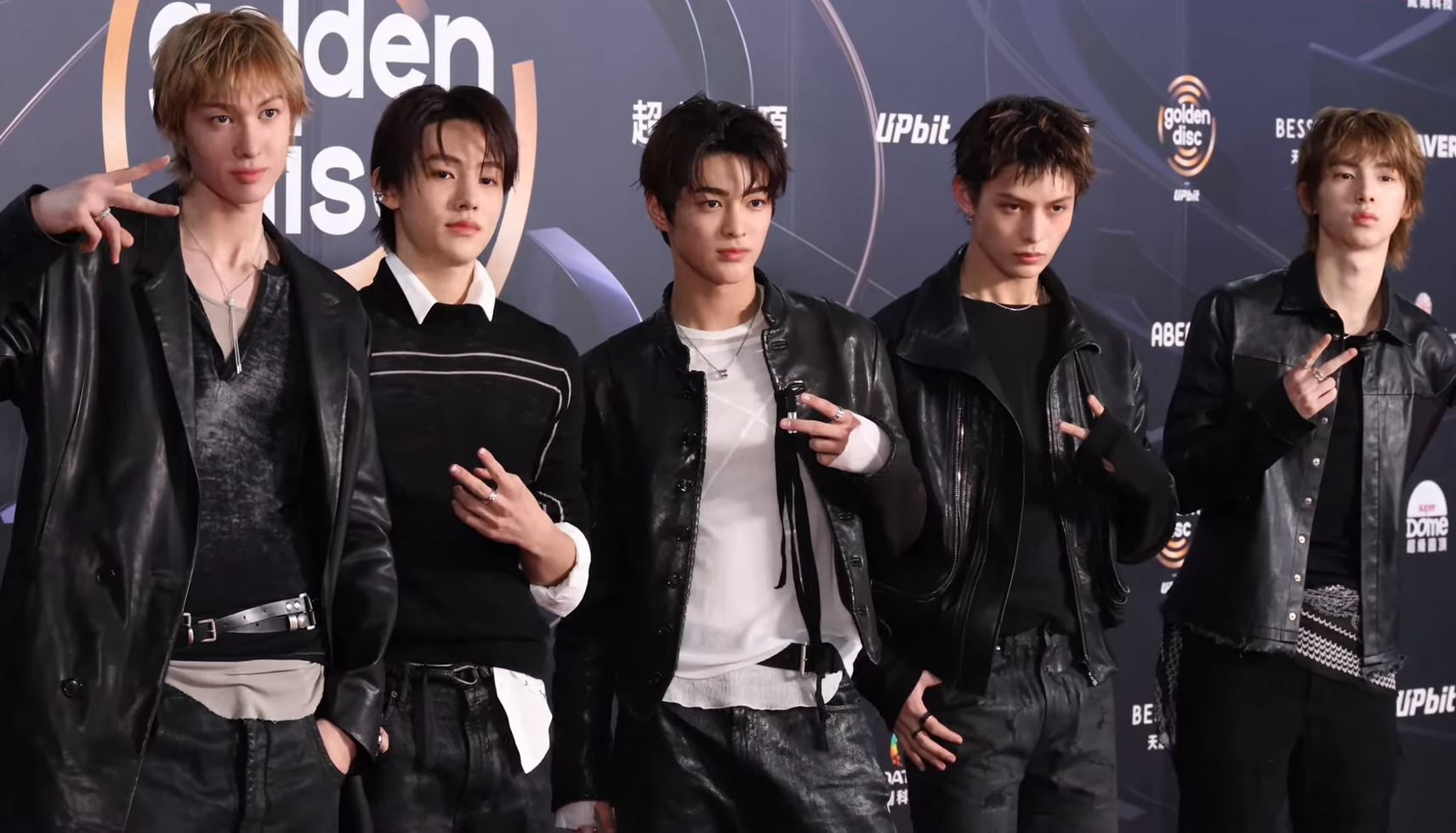
Cortis at the 40th Golden Disc Awards, where they won Rookie Artist of the Year along with AllDay Project.

In January 2026, Cortis attended the 40th Golden Disc Awards, where they won Rookie Artist of the Year alongside co‑ed group AllDay Project, and was later nominated for Best K‑pop New Artist at the 2026 iHeartRadio Music Awards while "Go!" was nominated for Favorite TikTok Dance. They were named Friends of the NBA to help promote the league in Asia and were announced as the headlining performers for the 2026 NBA All-Star Game, becoming the first K‑pop group to perform at the event.

They headlined the NBA Crossover Concert Series at the Los Angeles Convention Center on February 12, 2026, and released the song "Mention Me" the following day as part of the soundtrack for the American animated film Goat. During the concert, they performed a new song titled "Young Creator Crew (YCC)" as a teaser for their upcoming second EP, with the track being heavily promoted on their TikTok. They performed at the Kia Forum during halftime of the 2026 NBA All-Star Celebrity Game, becoming the first K‑pop group to headline a halftime show in the event's history.

On March 6, 2026, Cortis announced their second EP, GreenGreen, with the lead single scheduled for release on April 20. On the same day, Color Outside the Lines surpassed two million sales, becoming the second K‑pop group to reach that milestone with a debut album after Zerobaseone. "RedRed" was released as GreenGreen's lead single on April 20, with GreenGreen finally released alongside a music video for "TNT" on May 4. "RedRed" became a breakout hit for the group, reaching number one at the Circle Digital Chart.

In June 2026, the group announced their first official tour, titled Put Your Phone Down, which would include stops in South Korea, Canada, the United States, and Japan. That same month, the song "Acai" from GreenGreen reached 10 million plays on YouTube within a month of its release, with the group adding a date to the tour after all six shows in North America sold out. During the 2026 FIFA World Cup, Cortis performed at Gwanghwamun Square in support of the South Korea national football team and appeared in an advertisement for the team produced by their sponsor KT Corporation. From September 4 to 6, Cortis held their first solo concerts in Japan, at Kanagawa's Pia Arena MM as part of the Put Your Phone Down tour, which were also sold out completely.

== Artistry ==
=== Influences ===
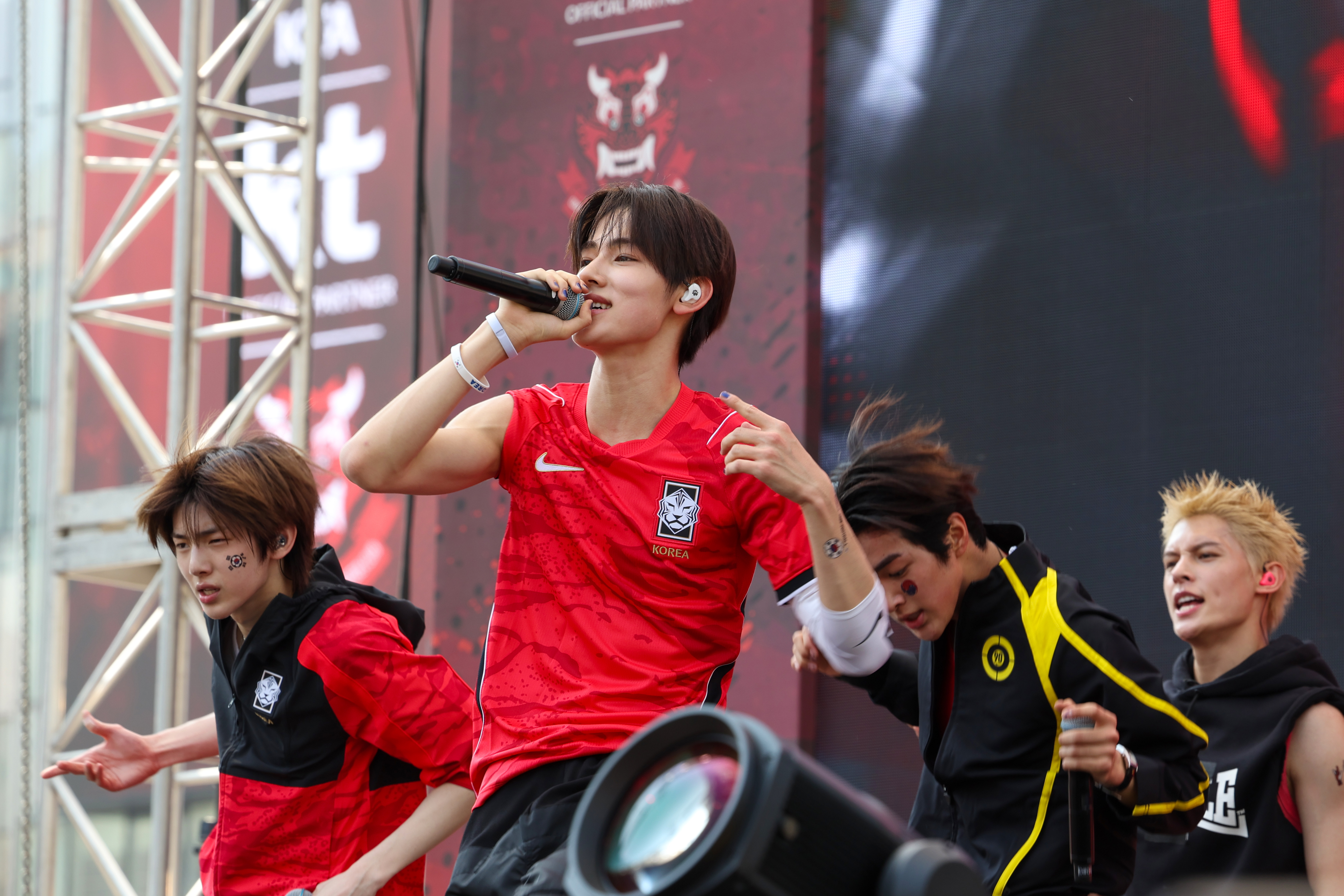
Cortis performing at Gwanghwamun Square in 2026.

Cortis have cited hip hop as an influence while emphasizing a musical identity centered on authenticity and self‑expression. Other Western genres have also influenced the group, with Forbes noting that Cortis sounded "more westernized or global than most rookie groups", while the members still identify as K-pop artists. Martin, the group's leader, cites Tyler, the Creator and Mac Miller among his favorite artists. The other members refer to Yungblud, Chet Baker, Elliott Smith, Tame Impala, Alice In Chains, Underworld, and Three 6 Mafia as some of the artists they listen to and gain inspiration from. Each member contributes to the group's dynamic, which Rolling Stone characterized as "curious about the future, wanting the whole world to know their names". Their styling, led by creative director Seoyoung Kim and Actoy, draws on punk and Y2K aesthetics. Teen Vogue praised the look as "spearheading the Y2K menswear renaissance", noting its skate-punk-inspired aesthetics. They were described as a "young creator crew" for their involvement in music, choreography, and video production.

=== Musical style ===
The Hollywood Reporter observed that although songs such as "Go!" and "What You Want" were sonically different, both suited the group’s artistic vision, concluding that "Cortis seems focused on one thing more than making exactly the kind of music expected of them: authenticity." The group's musical identity and social media content were described by The Korea Herald as creating "a distinct identity for themselves through fresh sounds and performances that defy expectations." Color Outside the Lines was included on the list of the 15 Best Non‑English Albums of 2025 by Teen Vogue, with the publication describing the record as "short and slightly derivative of their influences" but noted it "stands as a testament to what's to come".

== Members ==
- James (제임스)
- Juhoon (주훈)
- Martin (마틴) – leader
- Seonghyeon (성현)
- Keonho (건호)

== Discography ==
=== Extended plays ===
List of extended plays, showing selected details, selected chart positions, sales figures, and certifications
Title	Details	Peak chart positions									Sales	Certifications
Title	Details	KOR	AUT	BEL (FL)	BEL (WA)	GER	JPN	JPN Hot	US	US World	Sales	Certifications
Color Outside the Lines	Released: September 8, 2025; Labels: BigHit; Formats: CD, LP, digital download, streaming	1	19	29	54	67	4	28	15	1	KOR: 2,148,582; JPN: 34,423	KMCA: Million; KMCA: Platinum (Weverse)
GreenGreen	Released: May 4, 2026; Labels: BigHit; Formats: CD, LP, digital download, streaming	1	7	5	3	11	2	4	3	1	KOR: 2,885,985; JPN: 95,225; US: 81,500	KMCA: 2x Million; KMCA: 2x Platinum (Weverse); RIAJ: Gold (phy.)

=== Singles ===
List of singles, showing year released, selected chart positions, and name of the album
Title	Year	Peak chart positions										Album
Title	Year	KOR	JPN Hot	MYS Intl.	NZ Hot	SGP	TWN	US Bub.	US World	VIE Hot	WW	Album
"Go!"	2025	46	—	15	35	22	5	—	4	57	175	Color Outside the Lines
"What You Want"	2025	104	87	—	—	—	20	—	—	64	—	Color Outside the Lines
"Fashion"	2025	94	—	19	24	— (Note: "Fashion" did not enter the Official Singapore Chart, but peaked at number 12 on the Regional Chart.)	—	—	9	57	— (Note: "Fashion" did not enter the Billboard Global 200, but peaked at number 198 on the Global Excl. US.)	Color Outside the Lines
"RedRed"	2026	1	32	5	13	6	2	17	10	3	38	GreenGreen
"Motion" (featuring Juicy J)	2026	141	—	—	13	—	21	—	—	37	—	Non-album single
"—" denotes releases that did not chart or were not released in that region.

=== Soundtrack appearances ===
List of soundtrack appearances, showing year released, and name of the album
Title	Year	Peak chart positions		Album
Title	Year	NZ Hot	TWN	Album
"Mention Me"	2026	34	17	Goat OST

=== Other charted songs ===
List of other charted songs, showing year released, selected chart positions, and name of the album
Title	Year	Peak chart positions				Album
Title	Year	KOR	NZ Hot	TWN	VIE Hot	Album
"Joyride"	2025	— (Note: "Joyride" did not enter the Circle Digital Chart, but peaked at number 39 on the component Download Chart.)	—	—	—	Color Outside the Lines
"Lullaby"	2025	— (Note: "Lullaby" did not enter the Circle Digital Chart, but peaked at number 43 on the component Download Chart.)	—	—	—	Color Outside the Lines
"What You Want" (featuring Teezo Touchdown)	2025	— (Note: "What You Want" (featuring Teezo Touchdown) did not enter the Circle Digital Chart, but peaked at number 157 on the component Download Chart.)	—	—	—	Color Outside the Lines
"TNT"	2026	104	38	8	8	GreenGreen
"Acai"	2026	90	—	—	6	GreenGreen
"YoungCreatorCrew"	2026	60	—	—	68	GreenGreen
"Wassup"	2026	— (Note: "Wassup" did not enter the Circle Digital Chart, but peaked at number 24 on the component Download Chart.)	—	—	62	GreenGreen
"Blue Lips"	2026	— (Note: "Blue Lips" did not enter the Circle Digital Chart, but peaked at number 27 on the component Download Chart.)	—	—	59	GreenGreen
"—" denotes releases that did not chart or were not released in that region.

== Videography ==
=== Music videos ===
List of music videos
Title	Year	Director(s)	Ref.
"Go!"	2025	Idiots & Cortis	
"What You Want"	2025	Idiots & Cortis	
"Fashion"	2025	Bang Jaeyeob	
"Joyride"	2025	Bang Jaeyeob	
"Lullaby"	2025	Idiots & Cortis	
"RedRed"	2026	Idiots & Cortis	
"TNT"	2026	Idiots & Cortis	
"Acai"	2026	Bang Jaeyeob	
"Blue Lips"	2026	Yvng Wing (Idiots)	

== Live performances ==
=== Showcase ===
Event	Date	Venue	City	Country	Performed song(s)	Ref.
Color Outside the Lines Release Party	September 8, 2025	Korea University Hwajeong Gymnasium	Seoul	South Korea	"Fashion"; "Go!"; "What You Want"; "JoyRide"; "Lullaby"; "Fashion"; "What You Want"; "Fashion"	
RedRed Release Party	April 20, 2026	Yes24 Live Hall	Seoul	South Korea	"RedRed"; "YoungCreatorCrew"; "Fashion"; "What You Want"	

=== Music festivals ===
Event	Date	Venue	City	Country	Performed song(s)	Ref.
KOOM Festival	October 18, 2025	Duggal Greenhouse	New York	United States	"Go!"; "Fashion"; "What You Want"; "Fashion"; "Go!"	
NHK Music Expo Live 2025	November 3, 2025	Tokyo Dome	Tokyo	Japan	"What You Want"; "JoyRide"; "Go!"; "Fashion"	
Music Bank Global Festival 2025	December 14, 2025	Japan National Stadium	Tokyo	Japan	"What You Want"; "Fashion"; "Mic Drop"	
SBS Gayo Daejeon 2025	December 25, 2025	Inspire Arena	Incheon	South Korea	"Jingle Bell Rock"; "Go!"	

=== Awards shows ===
Event	Date	Venue	City	Country	Performed song(s)	Ref.
TikTok Awards 2025	October 25, 2025	Korea University's Hwajeong Gymnasium	Seoul	South Korea	"Go!"; "Fashion"	
2025 MAMA Awards	November 29, 2025	Kai Tak Stadium	Hong Kong	China	"Go!"; "Fashion"	
10th Asia Artist Awards	December 6, 2025	Kaohsiung National Stadium	Kaohsiung	Taiwan	"Go!"; "What You Want"	
40th Golden Disc Awards	January 10, 2026	Taipei Dome	Taipei	Taiwan	"What You Want"	

=== Other live performances ===
Event	Date	Venue	City	Country	Performed song(s)	Ref.
NBA Crossover Concert Series 2026	February 12, 2026	Los Angeles Convention Center	Los Angeles	United States	TBA	
NBA All-Star Celebrity Game Halftime Show	February 13, 2026	Kia Forum	Los Angeles	United States	TBA	
D.U.N.K. Showcase Yokohama	March 13, 2026	K-Arena Yokohama	Yokohama	Japan	TBA	
2026 Singapore Grand Prix	October 9, 2026	Marina Bay Street Circuit	Singapore		TBA	

== Accolades ==
=== Awards and nominations ===
Name of the award ceremony, year presented, category, nominee(s) of the award, and the result of the nomination
Award ceremony	Year	Category	Nominee(s)	Result	Ref.
Asia Artist Awards	2025	Rookie of the Year – Singer	Cortis	Won	
Asia Artist Awards	2025	Best Performance	Cortis	Won	
D Awards	2026	Dreams Silver Label	Cortis	Won	
The Fact Music Awards	2026	Record of the Year (Daesang)	Cortis	Won	
The Fact Music Awards	2026	Artist of the Year (Bonsang)	Cortis	Won	
The Fact Music Awards	2026	Next Leader	Cortis	Won	
Golden Disc Awards	2026	Rookie Artist of the Year	Cortis	Won	
Golden Disc Awards	2026	Most Popular Artist – Male	Cortis	Nominated	
iHeartRadio Music Awards	2026	Best K-pop New Artist	Cortis	Won	
iHeartRadio Music Awards	2026	Favorite TikTok Dance	"Go!"	Nominated	
Japan Record Awards	2026	Special International Music Award	Cortis	Won	
KM Chart Awards	2026	Record of the Year	"RedRed"	Won	
KM Chart Awards	2026	Ultimate 12	"RedRed"	Won	
Korea Broadcasting Awards	2026	The Best Singer Award	Cortis	Won	
Korea First Brand Awards	2026	Male Idol – Rookie (Indonesia)	Cortis	Won	
Korea First Brand Awards	2026	Male Idol – Rookie (Vietnam)	Cortis	Won	
Korea First Brand Awards	2026	Male Idol – Rookie	Cortis	Won	
Korea Grand Music Awards	2026	Best Artist	Cortis	Won	
MAMA Awards	2025	Artist of the Year	Cortis	Longlisted	
MAMA Awards	2025	Best New Artist	Cortis	Won	
MAMA Awards	2025	Fans' Choice Top 10 – Male	Cortis	Nominated	
MAMA Awards	2025	Song of the Year	"Go!"	Longlisted	
MAMA Awards	2025	Best Choreography	"Go!"	Nominated	
MAMA Awards	2026	Artist of the Year	Cortis	Nominated	
MAMA Awards	2026	Song of the Year	"RedRed"	Won	
MAMA Awards	2026	Best Male Group	Cortis	Nominated	
MAMA Awards	2026	Fans' Choice Top 10 – Male	Cortis	Won	
MAMA Awards	2026	Album of the Year	GreenGreen	Nominated	
MAMA Awards	2026	Best Choreography	"RedRed"	Nominated	
MAMA Awards	2026	Best Dance Performance Male Group	"RedRed"	Won	
MAMA Awards	2026	Favorite MCD Stage with Mnet Plus (April)	"RedRed"	Nominated	
MAMA Awards	2026	Best Song Top 10	"RedRed"	Won	
MAMA Awards	2026	Worldwide KCONer's Choice	"YoungCreatorCrew"	Nominated	
Melon Music Awards	2026	Artist of the Year	Cortis	Nominated	
Melon Music Awards	2026	Record of the Year	Cortis	Won	
Melon Music Awards	2026	Top 10 Artist	Cortis	Won	
Melon Music Awards	2026	Global Top 10 Artist	Cortis	Won	
Melon Music Awards	2026	Best Group – Male	Cortis	Nominated	
Melon Music Awards	2026	Kakao Bank Everyone's Star	Cortis	Nominated	
Melon Music Awards	2026	Japan Favorite Artist by U-Next	Cortis	Nominated	
Melon Music Awards	2026	Song of the Year	"RedRed"	Nominated	
Melon Music Awards	2026	Album of the Year	GreenGreen	Nominated	
MTV Video Music Awards	2026	Best New Artist	Cortis	Shortlisted	
MTV Video Music Awards	2026	Best Group	Cortis	Nominated	
MTV Video Music Awards	2026	Best K-pop	"RedRed"	Nominated	
TikTok Awards Korea	2025	Global Rookie Award	Cortis	Won	

=== Listicles ===
Name of publisher, year listed, name of listicle, and placement
Publisher	Year	Listicle	Placement	Ref.
Forbes Asia	2026	30 Under 30	Placed	
Variety	2026	Variety's Young Hollywood Impact – Emerging Talents	Placed	
