= Color Outside the Lines =

- Digital cover

EP by Cortis
- Released: September 8, 2025
- Genres: Hip-hop; K-pop
- Length: 17:33
- Language: Korean
- Label: Big Hit
- Producers: "Hitman" Bang; Wyatt Bernard; Austin Corona; Zach Fogarty; James; Johnny Goldstein; Hiss Noise; Martin; Supreme Boi; Slush Puppy

Cortis chronology
Color Outside the Lines (2025)	GreenGreen (2026)

Singles from Color Outside the Lines
- 1. "Go!" Released: August 11, 2025; 2. "What You Want" Released: August 18, 2025; 3. "Fashion" Released: September 8, 2025

Professional ratings
Review scores
Source	Rating
AllMusic	4/5 stars
IZM	3/5 stars

Color Outside the Lines is the first extended play by South Korean boy band Cortis. The EP was released by BigHit Music on September 8, 2025, and is supported by the singles "Go!", "What You Want" and "Fashion".

== Background and release ==
In April 2025, Hybe Corporation, BigHit Music's parent company, announced their plan to debut a new boy band in the third quarter of the year. BigHit Music further confirmed the news in June, announcing an August debut for the group. The band members and its name, Cortis, were officially announced on July 14 and August 7, respectively.

Cortis released a music video for the track "Go!" on August 11, before officially debuting on August 18 with the release of the EP's lead single "What You Want". An English version of "What You Want", featuring American rapper Teezo Touchdown, was released four days later. Color Outside the Lines was released alongside the music video for "Fashion" on September 8.

== Commercial performance ==
According to data provided by Hanteo Chart, Color Outside the Lines sold approximately 250,000 copies on its first day of release, breaking the record for the highest first day sale for a K-pop act that debuted in 2025. Within a week, approximately 430,000 copies of the EP were sold, making it the fourth highest in initial sales for a K-pop act's debut album. In the US, the EP debuted at number 15 on the Billboard 200, the second highest ever for a K-pop act's debut album.

== Track listing ==
Color Outside the Lines track listing
No.	Title	Writer(s)	Producer(s)	Length
1.	"Go!"	Johnny Goldstein; Supreme Boi; Martin; Hiss Noise; James; Mary Lou Mortimer; Seonghyeon; Keonho; Juhoon	Goldstein; Hiss Noise^{[a]}; Supreme Boi^{[a]}	2:50
2.	"What You Want"	Supreme Boi; Teezo Touchdown; Hiss Noise; Zach Fogarty; Seonghyeon; Slush Puppy; "Hitman" Bang; Martin; Keonho; Juhoon	Supreme Boi; Hiss Noise; Fogarty; Slush Puppy; Bang	3:14
3.	"Fashion"	Supreme Boi; Martin; Hiss Noise; Slush Puppy; Gino the Ghost; Anthony Watts; Keonho; Seonghyeon; Juhoon	Supreme Boi; Hiss Noise; Slush Puppy	2:54
4.	"Joyride"	Hiss Noise; Martin; Austin Corona; Wyatt Bernard; DCF; Kristin Carpenter; Seonghyeon; Supreme Boi; James; Juhoon; Keonho	Hiss Noise; Corona; Bernard; Martin; James	2:37
5.	"Lullaby"	Martin; James; Supreme Boi; Hiss Noise; Seonghyeon	Martin; Supreme Boi; Hiss Noise	2:44
6.	"What You Want" (featuring Teezo Touchdown)	Touchdown; Supreme Boi; Hiss Noise; Fogarty; Seonghyeon; Slush Puppy; Martin; Keonho; Juhoon; James	Supreme Boi; Hiss Noise; Fogarty; Slush Puppy; Bang	3:14
Total length:				17:33

Notes

- ^{^[a]}Signifies an additional producer

== Charts ==
=== Weekly charts ===
Weekly chart performance for Color Outside the Lines
Chart (2025–2026)	Peak position
Austrian Albums (Ö3 Austria)	19
Belgian Albums (Ultratop Flanders)	29
Belgian Albums (Ultratop Wallonia)	54
Croatian International Albums (HDU)	12
French Albums (SNEP)	39
German Albums (Offizielle Top 100)	67
Greek Albums (IFPI)	76
Hungarian Physical Albums (MAHASZ)	6
Japanese Albums (Oricon)	4
Japanese Combined Albums (Oricon)	6
Japanese Hot Albums (Billboard Japan)	28
Norwegian Physical Albums (IFPI Norge)	7
South Korean Albums (Circle)	1
Swedish Physical Albums (Sverigetopplistan)	9
US Billboard 200	15
US World Albums (Billboard)	1

=== Monthly charts ===
Monthly chart performance for Color Outside the Lines
Chart (2025)	Position
Japanese Albums (Oricon)	17
South Korean Albums (Circle)	1

=== Year-end charts ===
Year-end chart performance for Color Outside the Lines
Chart (2025)	Position
Japanese Top Albums Sales (Billboard Japan)	87
South Korean Albums (Circle)	18

== Certifications ==
Certifications for Color Outside the Lines
Region	Certification	Certified units/sales
South Korea (KMCA)	Million	1,000,000^{^}
South Korea (KMCA) Weverse Albums	Platinum	250,000^{^}
^{^} Shipments figures based on certification alone.

== Release history ==
Release history and formats for Color Outside the Lines
Region	Date	Format	Label
Various	September 8, 2025	CD; vinyl LP; digital download; streaming	BigHit Music
