= Mono (I-dle song) =

Single by I-dle featuring Skaiwater
- Language: English; Korean
- Released: January 27, 2026
- Length: 2:50
- Label: Cube; Kakao
- Composers: Icebluerabbit; Daily; Shannon Bae; Kameron Glasper; Likey
- Lyricists: Icebluerabbit; Shannon Bae; Skaiwater

I-dle singles chronology
"Where Do We Go" (2025)	"Mono" (2026)	"Hide and Seek" (2026)

Skaiwater singles chronology
"Pop" (2025)	"Mono" (2026)

Music video
- "Mono" on YouTube

Professional ratings
Review scores
Source	Rating
IZM	3.5/5 stars

"Mono" is a song recorded by South Korean girl group I-dle featuring British rapper and record producer Skaiwater. It was released by Cube Entertainment on January 27, 2026. Initially a standalone single, the song was later included on I-dle's ninth Korean extended play We Made.

== Background and release ==
On January 20, 2026, with the release of a concept video, it was announced that I-dle would be releasing a digital single titled "Mono" on January 27, featuring British rapper and record producer Skaiwater. Concept photos were released on January 22 and 23. On January 26, the music video teaser for the song was released. The song was released alongside its music video on January 27.

== Composition ==
"Mono" was written and composed by Icebluerabbit and Shannon Bae, and arranged by Daily and Likey, with Skaiwater participating in the lyrics, and Daily, Kameron Glasper and Likey participating in the composition. Icebluerabbit was later revealed during I-dle's Syncopation World Tour to be a pseudonym used by member Soyeon. The song is described as a "minimalist song with an I-dle-like color", featuring an addictive melody and attractive lyrics.

== Promotion ==
I-dle performed "Mono" on four music programs in the first week of promotion: Mnet's M Countdown on January 29, KBS's Music Bank on January 30, MBC's Show! Music Core on January 31, and SBS's Inkigayo on February 1.

== Accolades ==
Music program awards for "Mono"
Program	Date	Ref.
Inkigayo	February 8, 2026	
M Countdown	February 5, 2026	
Music Bank	February 6, 2026	

== Charts ==
=== Weekly charts ===
Weekly chart performance for "Mono"
Chart (2026)	Peak position
China Korean (TME)	1
Hong Kong (Billboard)	8
Singapore Regional (RIAS)	30
South Korea (Circle)	95
South Korea (Korea Hot 100)	86
Taiwan (Billboard)	3

=== Monthly charts ===
Monthly chart performance for "Mono"
Chart (2026)	Position
South Korea (Circle)	99

== Release history ==
Release history for "Mono"
Region	Date	Format	Label
Various	January 27, 2026	Digital download; streaming	Cube; Kakao
