= Skaiwater =

British rapper (born 2000)

- Also known as: skai, tigerstfu, skaiwater, princess, tiger lily, Gigi, mothr, mia, manson
- Born: Tyler Ryan Lee Jordan Brooks; 31 August 2000 (age 26); Nottingham, U.K.
- Origin: Nottingham, U.K.
- Genres: Hip-hop; Jersey club; rage
- Occupations: Rapper; record producer
- Labels: GoodTalk; Capitol

Tyler Ryan Lee Jordan Brooks (born 31 August 2000), known professionally as Skaiwater is a British musician and record producer from Nottingham. Brooks first rose to commercial fame on TikTok with the release of their (Note: Brooks, while identifying as non-binary, goes by any pronouns. This article uses singular they for consistency.) track, "#miles", as well as its accompanying remix featuring Lil Uzi Vert.

== Early life ==
Brooks was born in Nottingham, England on August 31, 2000, to a British-Jamaican mother and Sierra Leonean father, their younger brother Elijah was born a few years after. Growing up in Nottingham, they were inspired to make music by their parents. They were first introduced to music production by their father, around the age of eight or eleven. Around the age of 16, their father taught them how to record music. After buying a mic, and audio interface, they would continue to record music and would not stop. At 19, they would begin to take music production seriously.

== Career ==
In May 2021, Skaiwater released their mixtape Happy Hour with an appearance from American rapper Lil Keed. They gained popularity on TikTok with their hit single "#miles". In November 2022, they released their album Rave with appearances from rappers Lil Uzi Vert, XLOVCLO, and Prentiss.

In February 2024, Skaiwater released "Rain" which would go on to gain some traction online, garnering over two million streams on Spotify as well as over one million views on YouTube.

In March 2024, Skaiwater released "Light!" featuring Lil Nas X and 9lives. This marked the first feature of Lil Nas X's career and the second time the two artists have collaborated. Their first collaboration occurring in 2018 on Lil Nas X's song "No Love".

On June 14, 2024, Skaiwater released their long-awaited album #gigi, with features from Lil Nas X, Karrahbooo and more. Following the release of the album, they supported Bktherula on her I Just Wanna Be Me tour along with Yhapojj.

On February 14, 2025, Skaiwater released their second studio album #mia, which included a feature from rapper/singer RADA.

On May 19, 2025, Skaiwater released EPs pinkPrint and pinkPrint 2, after previously releasing them on SoundCloud under the alias 'lily'. On June 13, 2025, Skaiwater completed their pinkPrint trilogy and released EP pinkPrint 3.

On January 27, 2026, Skaiwater was featured on Korean girl group I-dle's digital single "Mono". On February 20, 2026, Skaiwater released a new album, titled wonderful. Their project was ranked as one of the "30 best projects of 2026." Additionally, they were named as one of the best artists of 2026 by the same company.

== Personal life ==
Skaiwater is non-binary. They are of Jamaican descent and have lived in Los Angeles, US, since April 2023. Skaiwater cites how Travis Scott was one of their big inspirations as a teenager, their favorite album by Scott is Rodeo. They also enjoy Kanye West, SZA, and Frank Ocean. Their favorite albums by West are My Beautiful Dark Twisted Fantasy and 808s & Heartbreak. They also have a dog named Biggie. Biggie has made several cameos, as he's been featured on eight cover arts by Skaiwater, and has made his debut in the music video for "light!".

== Discography ==
=== Studio albums ===
List of studio albums
Title	Details
Rave	Released: November 11, 2022; Label: GoodTalk; Format: Digital download, streaming
#gigi	Released: June 14, 2024; Label: GoodTalk, Capitol; Format: Digital download, streaming
#mia	Released: February 14, 2025; Label: GoodTalk, Capitol; Format: Digital download, streaming
Wonderful	Released: February 20, 2026; Label: GoodTalk, Capitol; Format: Digital download, streaming

=== Mixtapes ===
List of mixtapes
Title	Details
Happy Hour	Released: May 5, 2021; Label: Independent; Format: Digital download, streaming
Rave (NC)	Released: March 3, 2023; Label: GoodTalk; Format: Digital download, streaming

=== Extended plays ===
List of extended plays
Title	Details
After God Fear Eve	Released: June 6, 2019; Label: Independent; Format: Digital download, streaming
Party Pack	Released: December 2, 2020; Label: Independent; Format: Digital download, streaming
I Don't Miss Her at All	Released: December 20, 2021; Label: Independent; Format: Digital download, streaming
pinkPrint	Released: February 13, 2025; Label: GoodTalk, Capitol; Format: Digital download, streaming
pinkPrint 2	Released: April 4, 2025; Label: GoodTalk, Capitol; Format: Digital download, streaming
pinkPrint 3	Released: June 13, 2025; Label: GoodTalk, Capitol; Format: Digital download, streaming
