= Magic Hour (Surf Curse album) =

2022 indie rock album

Studio album by Surf Curse
- Released: October 7, 2022
- Studio: Electric Lady Studios
- Genre: Indie rock
- Length: 44:54
- Label: Atlantic
- Producer: Chris Coady

Surf Curse chronology
Heaven Surrounds You (2019)	Magic Hour (2022)

Singles from Magic Hour
- 1. "Sugar" Released: March 30, 2022; 2. "TVI" Released: July 14, 2022; 3. "Lost Honor" Released: August 10, 2022; 4. "Self Portrait" Released: September 7, 2022; 5. "Arrow" Released: September 28, 2022

Magic Hour is the fourth studio album and major-label debut by American band Surf Curse and their first album with Atlantic Records. Produced by Chris Coady, it was released on October 7, 2022. The album received generally favorable reviews.

== Background and production ==
Formerly based in Las Vegas and Reno, Nevada, Surf Curse was formed by Nick Rattigan and Jacob Rubeck in 2013. The two relocated to Los Angeles, gaining commercial success after their 2013 single "Freaks" became popular on TikTok in 2020. After signing with Atlantic Records, the band added Noah Kohll and Henry Dillon to their line-up. Magic Hour is both the band's debut album with Atlantic Records and the two new band members.

Magic Hour, Surf Curse's fourth studio album, was produced by Chris Coady and recorded at Electric Lady Studios in New York City. Commenting on the band's genre shifts–and despite the band's name implying that they play surf-rock–Rattigan said that type of music was "not really what we do anymore." The album was intended as a demonstration of the band's departure from their earlier "lo-fi, post-punk sound".

== Release ==
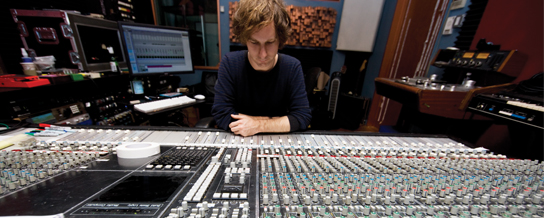
Chris Coady (pictured 2009) produced the album.

The album's release was scheduled for September 16, 2022; it was released October 7. The lead single "Sugar" had been released in March that year, followed by "TVI" in July, "Lost Honor" in August, and "Self Portrait" in September.

=== Critical reception ===
Oliver Heffron of The Nuance Magazine said Surf Curse "hit their stride" with the album, describing the stylistic shifts as "an exciting development". Vidal N. Granados of Quip, reflecting on a Surf Curse's concert performance after the album's release, commented that Magic Hour's tracks had a "much slower" pace than the band's earlier works and had new dynamics introduced by Kholl and Dillon. Landry Wood of The Rice Thresher commented that the album's opener, "Arrow", could "dupe" listeners into expecting more music like that off Surf Curse's 2017 Nothing Yet. Instead, Wood said the album was "an evolution that doesn't go quite far enough to be a reinvention" and praised "Fear City" as "refreshing sound with creative lyrics, a rarity for Rattigan."

== Track listing ==
Magic Hour track listing
No.	Title	Length
1.	"Arrow"	2:06
2.	"Cathy"	2:57
3.	"Sugar"	2:43
4.	"Lost Honor"	3:59
5.	"Self Portrait"	3:32
6.	"Unwell"	6:13
7.	"Strange"	3:55
8.	"TVI"	2:41
9.	"Little Rock 'n' Roller"	2:30
10.	"No Tomorrows"	6:02
11.	"Fear City"	4:35
12.	"Randall Flagg"	3:39
Total length:		44:54

== Personnel ==
Surf Curse

- Nick Rattigan – drums (all tracks), lead vocals (tracks 1, 3, 5–8, 11, 12)
- Jacob Rubeck – guitar (all tracks), lead vocals (tracks 2, 4, 9, 10)
- Noah Kohll – guitar (all tracks)
- Henry Dillon – bass (all tracks)

Other musicians

- Gillian Rivers – viola (tracks 7, 8, 12), violin (tracks 7, 8, 12)
- Kenny Wang – viola (tracks 7, 8, 12)
- Taylor Zaro – cello (tracks 7, 8, 12)
- Stuart Bogie – horns (track 11)
- Maddeleine Boyd – guest vocals (track 11)
- Cole Haden – guest vocals (track 11)
