= Late Night Drive Home =

American rock band

Late Night Drive Home (LNDH)
- Origin: El Paso, Texas, U.S.
- Genres: emo; alt rock; indie rock; garage rock revival
- Years active: 2019-2025
- Labels: 48 Hours Entertainment, Epitaph Records
- Members: Andre Portillo
- Website: latenightdrivehome.com

Late Night Drive Home (stylized in lowercase), often shortened to LNDH, is a 4-person rock band from El Paso, Texas. The band consisted of lead singer Andre Portillo, bassist Freddy Baca, guitarist Juan "Ockz" Vargas, and drummer Brian Dolan who all left but Portillo.

== History ==
The band was formed in early 2019 by Portillo and Ockz. The duo's first songs were initially released on SoundCloud, "Waiting for U" in March 2019, and "Pillow Monsters" in May 2019. In June of 2019, the duo released their debut EP, floral, including "Pillow Monsters". In July of the same year, they released a non-album single, "Guardians of Space".

"Talk To Me (Before the Night Ends)" released June 2021. This was the first song with the inclusion of the bassist and drummer, Freddy Baca and Brian Dolan. "Best Friend" was released August 2021, backed with a cover of Surf Curse's "Freaks". In September 2021, the band released their EP Am I sinking or Am I swimming?, featuring their most popular song, "Stress Relief", which has over 100 million streams on Spotify, and the music video was released November 2023.

How Are We Feeling? is the band's debut album, released June 2022. It contains the singles "Television Romantic" and "Awkward Conversations". The band released a single, "Drug Asphyxiation", in June 2023. The band signed onto Epitaph Records in November 2023. They announced a new EP, I'll remember you for the same feeling you gave me as I slept, and released the lead single off of it, "Believe Me (Even if I'm Lying)" January 2024. They were announced for Coachella 2024 a week later. March 2025, they announced a new album, titled As I Watch My Life Online. The lead single, "Terabyte", released later that week.

== Band members ==
- Andre Portillo – lead vocals, rhythm guitar (2019 - 2026)
- Juan Vargas – lead guitar, backup vocals (2019 - 2025)
- Freddy Baca – bass (2021 - 2025)
- Brian Dolan – drums (2021 - 2025)

== Discography ==
Studio albums

- As I Watch My Life Online (2025)

Extended plays

- floral (2019)
- Am I sinking or Am I swimming? (2021)
- How Are We Feeling? (2022)
- I'll remember you for the same feeling you gave me as I slept (2024)

Singles

- "Best Friends"/"Freaks" (2021)
- "Stress Relief" (2021)
- "Star Love"/"Kill Me Sweet" (2021)
- ”Perfect Strangers” (2021)
- ”With A Dream Of You” (2023)
- ”Drug Asphyxiation” (2023)
- "Terabyte" (2025)
- "she came for a sweet time" (2025)
- "american church" (2025)
