= Coachella 2022 =

Edition of music festival

- Lineup poster
- Dates: Weekend 1: April 15, 2022–April 17, 2022; Weekend 2: April 22, 2022–April 24, 2022
- Locations: Empire Polo Club, Indio, California, United States
- Previous event: Coachella 2019
- Next event: Coachella 2023
- Website: coachella.com

The 2022 Coachella Valley Music and Arts Festival took place across two weekends: April 15 to 17 and April 22 to 24 at the Empire Polo Club, Indio, California, United States. The three headlining acts were Harry Styles, Billie Eilish and Swedish House Mafia with the Weeknd.

The 2022 edition of Coachella was the first to be held since 2019 after the cancellation of two previous editions due to the COVID-19 pandemic.

== Background ==
The 2020 festival line-up was announced on January 2, 2020, with headliners Rage Against the Machine, Travis Scott and Frank Ocean. The festival was originally set to be held on April 10–12 and 17–19, 2020, but due to the COVID-19 pandemic, it was rescheduled to October 2020. Ultimately, the 2020 plan for the festival was scrapped and the organizer announced the replacement dates in April 2021. But, on January 29, 2021, public health officer for Riverside County, California, Dr. Cameron Kaiser announced that the festival was cancelled as he signed a public health order due to the COVID-19 related concerns.

For the 2022 festival, Rage Against the Machine and Travis Scott were originally featured as headliners, carrying over from the cancelled events. Following the Astroworld Festival crowd crush in November 2021, Scott was removed as a headliner per request of a petition to remove him. Rage Against the Machine were also revealed to not be performing following the full lineup announcement in January 2022. Meanwhile, Frank Ocean was instead confirmed to headline the 2023 edition.

A new lineup, featuring initial headliners Harry Styles, Billie Eilish, and Kanye West under the moniker "Ye" was announced on January 12, 2022. On April 4, 2022, it was announced that Ye dropped out as a headliner and was replaced by a collaboration between Swedish House Mafia and The Weeknd. Swedish House Mafia was originally supposed to fill in the "Returning to the Desert" slot. Many names had been rumored to fill in the headliner slot, including Justin Bieber, Travis Scott, Silk Sonic (featuring Bruno Mars and Anderson .Paak) and Tyler, the Creator.

88rising made history as the first record label to showcase their roster at the festival. During the first weekend, Korean girl group 2NE1 reunited and gave their first performance since 2015. American hip-hop group Brockhampton announced that they would be disbanding and go on "indefinite hiatus", marking their Coachella appearance as their final performance.

== Line-up ==
Headline performers are listed in boldface. Artists listed from the latest to earliest set times.

=== Coachella Stage ===
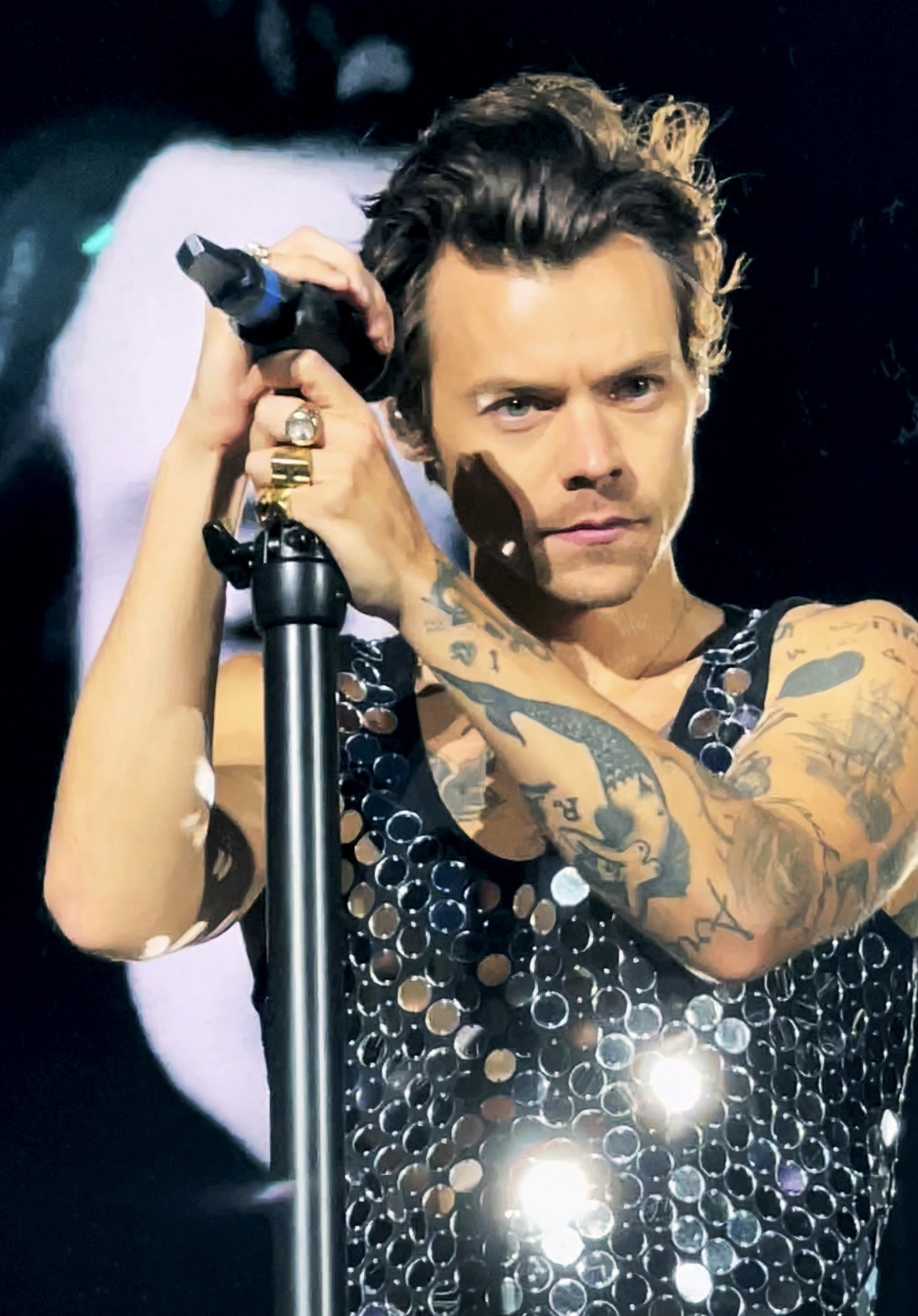
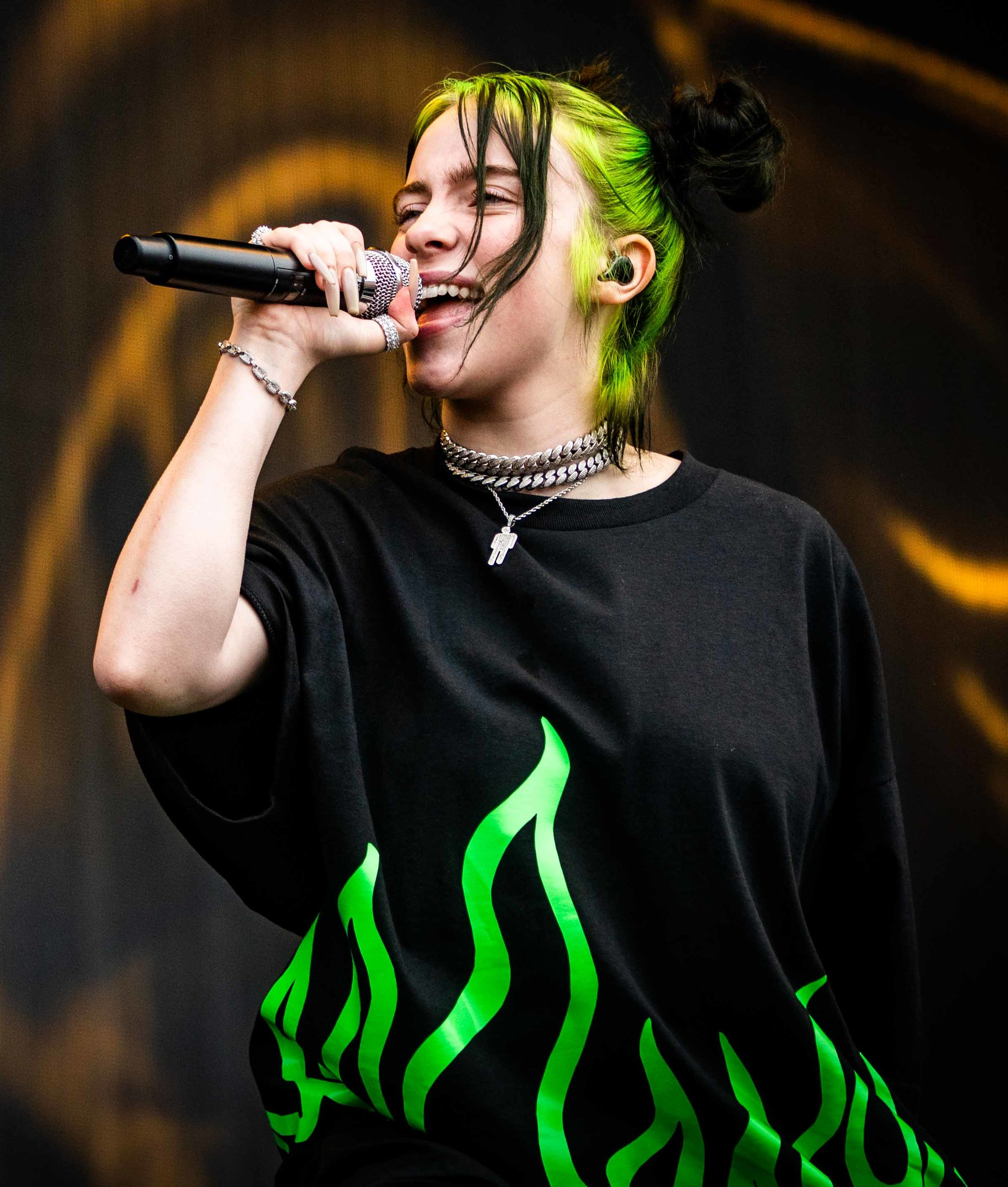
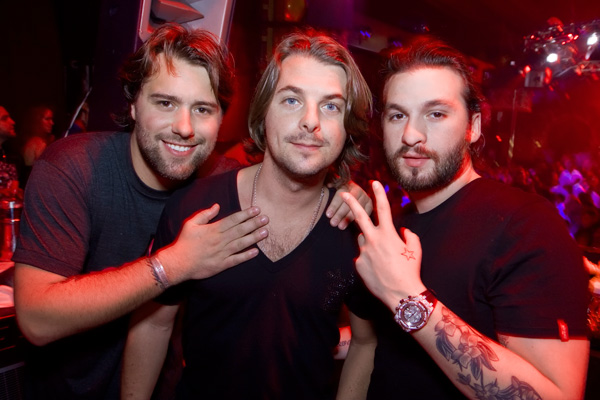
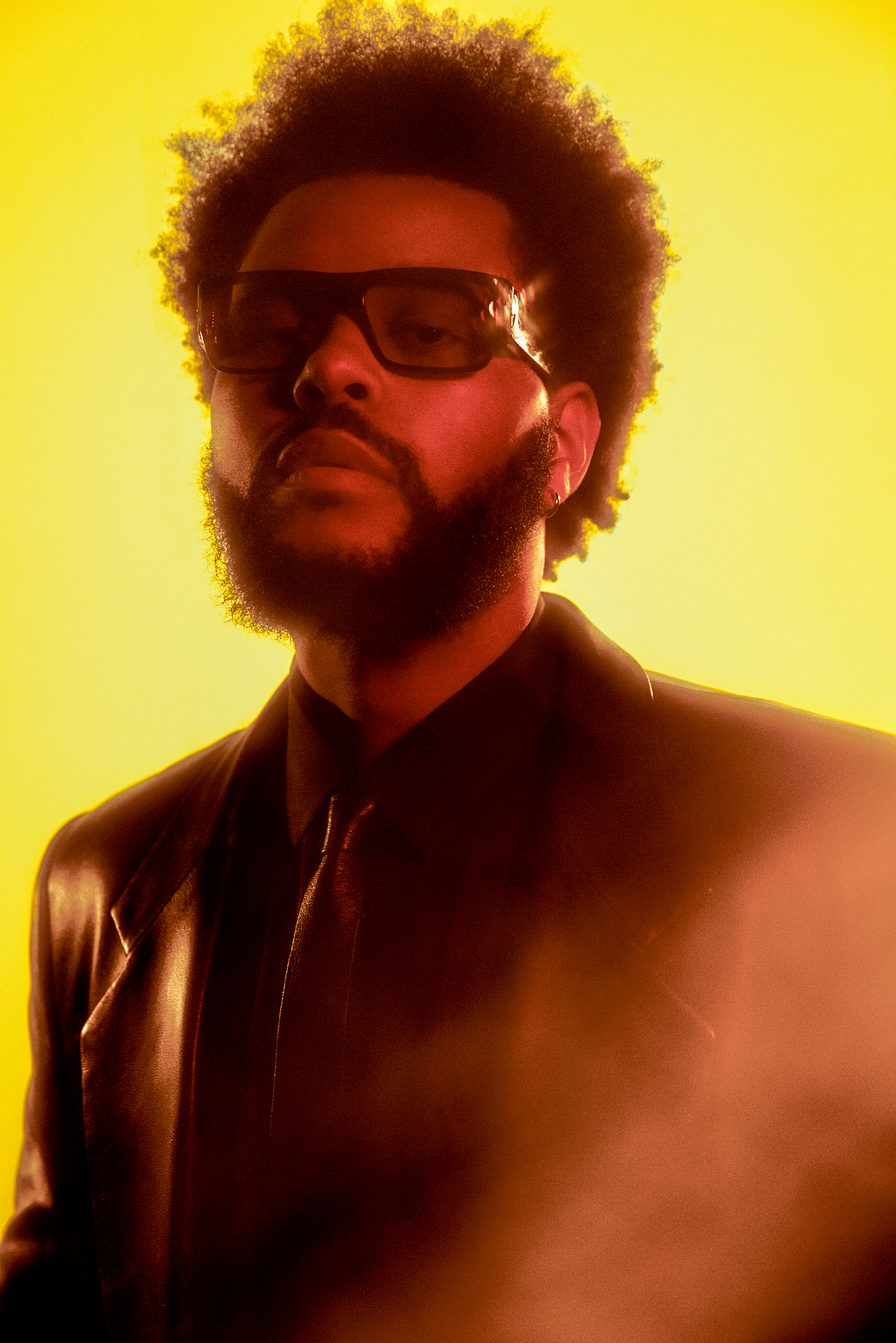
The 2022 festival headliners Harry Styles, Billie Eilish, and Swedish House Mafia × The Weeknd.

Friday	Saturday	Sunday
**Harry Styles**^{[A]}; Daniel Caesar^{[B]}; Lil Baby^{[C]}; Grupo Firme^{[D]}; Anitta^{[E]}; Ari Lennox; MIKA; Princess Nokia; Juicewon (Weekend 1); Saish K (Weekend 2)	**Billie Eilish**^{[F]}; Megan Thee Stallion; Flume^{[G]}; 88rising^{[H]}; Giveon; Conan Gray; Masego^{[I]}; Koffee; Record Safari	**Swedish House Mafia × The Weeknd**; Doja Cat^{[J]}; Karol G^{[K]}; Maggie Rogers; Run the Jewels (Weekend 1); Banda MS; Surf Curse (Weekend 1); Gabe Real (Weekend 1); Tiffany Tyson (Weekend 2)

- A. During the first weekend set, Harry Styles was joined by Shania Twain. During the second weekend set, he was joined by Lizzo.
- B. Daniel Caesar was joined by Justin Bieber during the first weekend set.
- C. Lil Baby was joined by Gunna during the first weekend set.
- D. Grupo Firme was joined by Becky G during the second weekend set.
- E. During the first weekend set, Anitta was joined by Snoop Dogg, Saweetie and Diplo. During the second weekend set, she was joined by Murda Beatz.
- F. During the first weekend set, Billie Eilish was joined by Khalid, Damon Albarn and Posdnuos of De La Soul. During the second weekend set, she was joined by Hayley Williams.
- G. During the first weekend set, Flume was joined by Kučka, Vince Staples, May-a, Laurel, Caroline Polachek, Oklou, Tove Lo and Beck. During the second weekend set, he was joined by Toro y Moi, Kučka, Vince Staples, May-a, Laurel, Damon Albarn, Caroline Polachek, Oklou and Tove Lo.
- H. During the first weekend, 88rising's set featured appearances by Warren Hue, Milli, Bibi, Niki, Rich Brian, Hikaru Utada, Jackson Wang, CL and 2NE1. During the second weekend, Aespa, Yeek, Milli, August 08, Dumbfoundead, Rich Brian and Warren Hue performed during the record label's set.
- I. Masego was joined by Devin Morrison and Alex Isley during the second weekend set.
- J. During both weekends, Doja Cat was joined by Tyga, Rico Nasty and Shonka Dukureh.
- K. During the first weekend, Karol G was joined by Tiësto and Becky G. During the second weekend, she was joined by Becky G and J Balvin.

=== Outdoor Theatre ===
Friday	Saturday	Sunday
King Gizzard & the Lizard Wizard; Louis the Child^{[A]}; Phoebe Bridgers^{[B]}; Madeon; NIKI; Omar Apollo^{[C]}; Bishop Briggs (Weekend 1); Chelsea Cutler (Weekend 2); The Hu; Yimbo (Weekend 1); Coby (Weekend 2)	Stromae; Danny Elfman; Disclosure^{[D]}; Cuco^{[E]}; Wallows; Beach Bunny; Chelsea Cutler (Weekend 1)^{[F]}; Gingee (Weekend 1); Loboman x Massio (Weekend 2)	Jamie xx; Joji; Solomun; FINNEAS^{[G]}; Alec Benjamin; Yola; Mariah the Scientist; Dave P (Weekend 1); Jaqckglam (Weekend 2)

- A. Louis the Child were joined by Royal & the Serpent, Aluna, Kasbo, Evan Giia, Drew Love, Nez, Theophilus London and Mark Foster of Foster the People.
- B. During both weekends, Phoebe Bridgers was joined by Arlo Parks.
- C. Omar Apollo was joined by Ruel during the first weekend.
- D. During the first weekend, Disclosure were joined by Khalid. During the second weekend, they were joined by Raye.
- E. During both weekends, Cuco was joined by Jean Carter.
- F. Chelsea Cutler was joined by Jeremy Zucker and Quinn XCII during the first weekend set.
- G. FINNEAS was joined by Lizzy McAlpine during the first weekend set.

=== Sonora Tent ===
Friday	Saturday	Sunday
Ela Minus; Amyl and the Sniffers; PUP; Spiritualized; The Chats; Code Orange; Jean Dawson; Giselle Woo & the Night Owls; Jim Smith (Weekend 1); crudo (Weekend 2)	Molchat Doma; black midi; Inner Wave; Mannequin Pussy; Nicki Nicole; Ed Maverick; Nilüfer Yanya; Beach Goons; Yard Act; Buster Jarvis (Weekend 1); Kuma (Weekend 2)	Nathy Peluso; Current Joys (Weekend 2); Eyedress; Crumb; Viagra Boys; Skegss; Altın Gün; Cariño; interventionboi (Weekend 1); Argenis (Weekend 2)

=== Gobi Tent ===
Friday	Saturday	Sunday
BADBADNOTGOOD; Epik High; The Avalanches; TOKiMONSTA; slowthai; The Marías; Role Model; The Regrettes; Arooj Aftab; Torres Martinez Birdsinging and Dancing	Kyary Pamyu Pamyu; Hot Chip; Freddie Gibbs & Madlib; Pabllo Vittar; Caroline Polachek; Rina Sawayama; Arlo Parks; L'Impératrice; Current Joys (Weekend 1); Surf Curse (Weekend 2); Alaina Castillo; Mark Lizaola (Weekend 1); Wave Groove (Weekend 2)	Belly; Natanael Cano; Ali Gatie; Chicano Batman; Orville Peck; beabadoobee; Hayden James; Sampa the Great; Massio (Weekend 1); Jillesque (Weekend 2)

=== Mojave Tent ===
Friday	Saturday	Sunday
Lane 8; Snoh Aalegra; Pink Sweat$^{[A]}; Run the Jewels (Weekend 2); IDLES; Arcade Fire (Weekend 1); Carly Rae Jepsen; Still Woozy; Raveena; Lawrence; MEUTE	DJ Koze; Floating Points; Caribou; Steve Lacy; Turnstile; Girl in Red; Japanese Breakfast; Holly Humberstone; Amber Mark; Gee Dee (Weekend 1); Sabeerah Najee (Weekend 2)	The Blessed Madonna + Honey Dijon; Jessie Reyez; Måneskin; Dave; Fred again..; Kim Petras; Emotional Oranges; Olivia O'Brien^{[B]}; Yimbo (Weekend 1); Inglish (Weekend 1)

- A. Pink Sweat$ was joined by Tori Kelly during the second weekend set.
- B. Olivia O'Brien was joined by Logan Paul during the first weekend set.

=== Sahara Tent ===
Friday	Saturday	Sunday
SLANDER; Big Sean^{[A]}; Baby Keem^{[B]}; Black Coffee; Cordae; City Girls; Dom Dolla; John Summit; Lost Kings; GG Magree; Venessa Michaels (Weekend 1); DJ Lord (Weekend 2); Gabe Real (Weekend 2)	21 Savage^{[C]}; Isaiah Rashad^{[D]}; Rich Brian; BROCKHAMPTON; Tchami; 100 gecs; Emo Nite^{[E]}; J.I.D^{[F]}; Whipped Cream; VNSSA; DJ Lord (Weekend 1)^{[G]}; Latane from Fundido (Weekend 1); DJ Susan (Weekend 2)	Denzel Curry^{[H]}; Duke Dumont; Duck Sauce; Vince Staples; Channel Tres^{[I]}; Griselda; Maxo Kream; Cre-8 (Weekend 1); Beijing Junglist (Weekend 2)

- A. During the first weekend set, Big Sean was joined by Jhené Aiko and YG. During the second weekend set, he was joined by Mike Posner.
- B. Baby Keem was joined by Kendrick Lamar during the second weekend set.
- C. 21 Savage was joined by Post Malone and Metro Boomin during the first weekend set.
- D. During the first weekend set, Isaiah Rashad was joined by Kal Banx, Doechii, Hugh Augustine and SiR. He was joined by Kal Banx, Doechii, Zacari and Hugh Augustine during the second weekend set.
- E. During the first weekend, Emo Nite set was joined by Forrest Kline of Hellogoodbye. During the second weekend, it was joined by Forrest Kline, Jacoby Shaddix of Papa Roach, 3OH!3 and Tom Higgenson of Plain White T's.
- F. J.I.D. was joined by EARTHGANG and Kenny Mason during the first weekend set.
- G. DJ Lord was joined by Chuck D during the second weekend set.
- H. Denzel Curry was joined by Glass Animals and J.I.D. during the first weekend set.
- I. Channel Tres was joined by Ty Dolla Sign during the first weekend set.

=== Yuma Tent ===
Friday	Saturday	Sunday
ARTBAT; The Martinez Brothers; Peggy Gou; Damian Lazarus; Daphni; Purple Disco Machine; Jayda G; Logic1000; SOHMI; Dear Humans	Richie Hawtin; Dixon; Chris Liebing; ANNA; Paco Osuna; Sama' Abdulhadi; DJ Holographic; Layla Benitez; Miane	Michael Bibi; Fatboy Slim; Bedouin; Satori (Weekend 1); Adam Port; Luttrell; AMÉMÉ; Cole Knight
