= Disco (Surf Curse song) =

2019 single by Surf Curse

- Single cover art

Single by Surf Curse

from the album Heaven Surrounds You
- Released: June 12, 2019
- Genre: Indie rock; indie pop
- Length: 2:32
- Label: Danger Collective

Surf Curse singles chronology
"Disco" (2019)	"Midnight Cowboy" (2019)

Music video
- "Disco" on YouTube

"Disco" is a song by the band Surf Curse, released in 2019 as the lead single from their third album Heaven Surrounds You on the Danger Collective label. It was released on 12 June alongside a music video directed by band member Nick Rattigan. The song, in part inspired by the film The Last Days of Disco, was praised for its use of guitar and percussion. The song garnered virality five years later through the video-sharing platform TikTok, topping the TikTok Billboard Top 50 chart in September 2024.

== Content and reception ==
The song was released on 12 June 2019 ahead of Heaven Surrounds You, Surf Curse's first album after band members Nick Rattigan and Jacob Rubeck relocated from Reno, Nevada to Los Angeles.

Released after "two years of silence from the band", Adrian Vargas of Atwood Magazine called the song "the strongest contenders for 2019's best dance anthem." Quinlan Keeley, writing for Stereogum, compared the song favorably to "A-Punk" and other early Vampire Weekend songs, saying the track has a "sparky guitar voice." Abby Jones of Pitchfork also positively compared the track to Vampire Weekend's debut, calling it the best song of the album.

The song was chosen to close some of the band's concerts during their 2022 tour, during which the song was particularly well-received during their tour opener in Las Vegas and at their November show in Houston.

The song later gained virality five years later through the video-sharing platform TikTok, after a trend emerged where two people (often in an intimate relationship with one another) would dance to the song leaning back and forth to each other along the beat. This trend led the song to number one on the TikTok Billboard Top 50 chart in September 2024.

== Music video ==
The music video, also released 12 June 2019, was directed by Rattigan. The video depicts "evening of raw emotion" between a couple in an apartment, dancing to the song in a "warmly-lit" apartment that, part way through the video, turns blue, hazy, and covered in tinsel like a "dimly lit dance hall". Vargas described the video as showing the couple as "stillness surrounds them", leaving viewers "breathless". Rubeck said the dancing was inspired by Hal Hartley dance videos.

== Charts ==
=== Weekly charts ===
Weekly chart performance for "Disco"
Chart (2024–2025)	Peak position
Canada (Canadian Hot 100)	100
Global 200 (Billboard)	183
Ireland (IRMA)	57
Lithuania (AGATA)	60
Netherlands (Dutch Single Tip)	27
UK Singles (Official Charts)	56
US Billboard Hot 100	91
US Hot Rock & Alternative Songs (Billboard)	14

=== Year-end charts ===
2024 year-end chart performance for "Disco"
Chart (2024)	Position
US Hot Rock & Alternative Songs (Billboard)	100

2025 year-end chart performance for "Disco"
Chart (2025)	Position
US Hot Rock & Alternative Songs (Billboard)	62

== Certifications ==
Certifications for "Disco"
Region	Certification	Certified units/sales
New Zealand (RMNZ)	Gold	15,000^{‡}
Poland (ZPAV)	Gold	25,000^{‡}
United Kingdom (BPI)	Silver	200,000^{‡}
United States (RIAA)	Gold	500,000^{‡}
^{‡} Sales+streaming figures based on certification alone.
