= Wasted Summers =

2023 pop rock song

Single by Juju <3

from the album Wasted Summers
- Released: July 12, 2023
- Recorded: 2023
- Genre: Pop rock; bedroom pop
- Length: 2:10
- Label: Not Fit for Society
- Songwriters: Julian Perez; Lailah Sandoval
- Producer: Dan Darmawan

Music video
- "Wasted Summers" on YouTube

"Wasted Summers" is a song by American singer Juju <3. It was released on July 12, 2023, as a standalone single through Not Fit for Society. The song features vocals by his 10-year-old sister Lailah and was produced by Dan Darmawan. It went viral on TikTok and topped Spotify's Viral 50 US chart. A visualizer was released for the song in September 2023. The official music video premiered on January 26, 2024.

== Background and composition ==
Both Julian Perez and his sister Lailah Sandoval wrote the song and posted it to TikTok in May 2023. It went viral with many users using the Sandoval-assisted portion of the track in their videos. This resulted in the duo releasing the song officially on July 12, 2023, through Not Fit for Society. A visualizer was released for the song in September 2023, and the music video in January 2024. The song was produced by Dan Darmawan and features vocals from his sister Lailah Sandoval as well. It is predominantly a melancholy pop-rock track with elements of bedroom pop.

== Music video ==
Directed by Mitch DiNello, the music video was filmed in October 2023, and premiered on January 26, 2024. The video begins with Perez sad and alone at a train station and alone in a field. As the video continues Perez is joined by his sister Sandoval and they are seen running around and dancing in the fields.

== Reception ==
The song reminded many of its listeners of the 2017 film The Florida Project mostly due to his sister joining him singing reminding listeners of the character Moonee, it was also compared to the likes of Alex G and Current Joys.

After its release on July 12, 2023, following its use on over 230,000 TikTok videos, it went to number 1 on Spotify's Viral 50 U.S. Chart. It debuted at No. 13 on Billboard Hot Alternative Songs, No. 25 on Hot Rock Songs, and No. 31 on Hot Rock & Alternative Songs with 2.8 million U.S. streams on September 9, 2023.

== Track listings ==
- Streaming/digital download
1. "Wasted Summers" – 2:10
- Streaming/digital download – versions EP
1. "Wasted Summers" (sped up) – 1:58
2. "Wasted Summers" (slowed down) – 2:35

== Charts ==
Chart performance for "Wasted Summers"
Chart (2023)	Peak position
US Hot Alternative Songs (Billboard)	13
US Hot Rock & Alternative Songs (Billboard)	31
US Hot Rock Songs (Billboard)	25
UK Independent Singles Breakers Chart (OCC)	8

== Certifications ==
Certifications for "Wasted Summers"
Region	Certification	Certified units/sales
United States (RIAA)	Gold	500,000^{‡}
^{‡} Sales+streaming figures based on certification alone.
