= TikTok Billboard Top 50 =

Billboard chart

The TikTok Billboard Top 50 was a music chart published weekly by Billboard in the United States. It ranked the most popular songs on the social media platform TikTok in the United States based on a combination of total creations, video views and user engagement on the platform. The chart premiered on September 14, 2023, with the song "SkeeYee" by American rapper Sexyy Red at number one. The longest-running number-one song on the chart was held by "Million Dollar Baby" by Tommy Richman, which stayed at the top for ten consecutive weeks. The chart was officially discontinued on March 7, 2025, lasting for only 18 months since its premiere as an official Billboard chart.

== Background ==
The video-sharing platform TikTok gained global popularity in the year 2019, and surpassed 2 billion mobile downloads worldwide in October 2020. TikTok has allowed many music artists to gain a wider audience, and has spawned several viral hit songs. Since the COVID-19 pandemic, the platform has also launched many songs that failed to garner initial commercial success into sleeper hits. One of the first examples of this phenomenon is the song "Old Town Road" by Lil Nas X, which started as a meme on TikTok, and became one of the biggest songs of 2019 and the longest-running number-one song in the history of the US Billboard Hot 100. A more recent example being 2023's "Paint the Town Red" by Doja Cat, which also topped the US Billboard Hot 100 after going viral on TikTok and became a worldwide hit. A study by MRC Data found in July 2021 that 67% of TikTok users are estimated to be more likely to look up songs on digital streaming platforms after hearing them on TikTok. While launching the chart, Billboard described TikTok as "the world’s most powerful platform for music discovery and promotion".

The chart was discontinued following the end of the TikTok and Billboard partnership on March 1, 2025. The final number-one song on the chart was "Not Like Us" by Kendrick Lamar.

== Number ones ==
=== 2023 ===
No.	Issue date	Song	Artist(s)	Ref.
1	September 14	"SkeeYee"	Sexyy Red	
2	September 23	"Wassup Gwayy"	FamousSally & YB	
2	September 30	"Wassup Gwayy"	FamousSally & YB	
3	October 7	"Sky"	Playboi Carti	
4	October 14	"My Love Mine All Mine"	Mitski	
4	October 21	"My Love Mine All Mine"	Mitski	
4	October 28	"My Love Mine All Mine"	Mitski	
5	November 4	"Mr. Take Ya Bitch"	Lil Mabu and chriseanrock	
5	November 11	"Mr. Take Ya Bitch"	Lil Mabu and chriseanrock	
re	November 18	"My Love Mine All Mine"	Mitski	
re	November 25	"My Love Mine All Mine"	Mitski	
re	December 2	"My Love Mine All Mine"	Mitski	
re	December 9	"Sky"	Playboi Carti	
6	December 16	"Surround Sound"	JID, 21 Savage and Baby Tate	
6	December 23	"Surround Sound"	JID, 21 Savage and Baby Tate	
7	December 30	"All I Want for Christmas Is You"	Mariah Carey	

=== 2024 ===
No.	Issue date	Song	Artist(s)	Ref.
7	January 6	"All I Want for Christmas Is You"	Mariah Carey	
8	January 13	"Misty"	Lesley Gore	
9	January 20	"Never Lose Me"	Flo Milli	
9	January 27	"Never Lose Me"	Flo Milli	
9	February 3	"Never Lose Me"	Flo Milli	
9	February 10	"Never Lose Me"	Flo Milli	
10	February 17	"Dance You Outta My Head"	Cat Janice	
11	February 24	"What You Won't Do for Love"	Bobby Caldwell	
12	March 2	"End of Beginning"	Djo	
13	March 9	"Carnival"	¥$ featuring Rich the Kid and Playboi Carti	
13	March 16	"Carnival"	¥$ featuring Rich the Kid and Playboi Carti	
re	March 23	"End of Beginning"	Djo	
14	March 30	"Someday I'll Get It"	Alek Olsen	
14	April 6	"Someday I'll Get It"	Alek Olsen	
14	April 13	"Someday I'll Get It"	Alek Olsen	
14	April 20	"Someday I'll Get It"	Alek Olsen	
15	April 27	"Tell Ur Girlfriend"	Lay Bankz	
15	May 4	"Tell Ur Girlfriend"	Lay Bankz	
15	May 11	"Tell Ur Girlfriend"	Lay Bankz	
16	May 18	"Million Dollar Baby"	Tommy Richman	
16	May 25	"Million Dollar Baby"	Tommy Richman	
16	June 1	"Million Dollar Baby"	Tommy Richman	
16	June 8	"Million Dollar Baby"	Tommy Richman	
16	June 15	"Million Dollar Baby"	Tommy Richman	
16	June 22	"Million Dollar Baby"	Tommy Richman	
16	June 29	"Million Dollar Baby"	Tommy Richman	
16	July 6	"Million Dollar Baby"	Tommy Richman	
16	July 13	"Million Dollar Baby"	Tommy Richman	
16	July 20	"Million Dollar Baby"	Tommy Richman	
17	July 27	"Champagne Coast"	Blood Orange	
18	August 3	"Juna"	Clairo	
19	August 10	"Alibi"	Sevdaliza, Pabllo Vittar, and Yseult	
20	August 17	"Kehlani"	Jordan Adetunji	
20	August 24	"Kehlani"	Jordan Adetunji	
21	August 31	"Symphony"	Clean Bandit featuring Zara Larsson	
21	September 7	"Symphony"	Clean Bandit featuring Zara Larsson	
21	September 14	"Symphony"	Clean Bandit featuring Zara Larsson	
22	September 21	"Disco"	Surf Curse	
23	September 28	"Rollin'"	BabyChiefDoit	
24	October 5	"Forever Young"	Alphaville	
25	October 12	"Maps"	Yeah Yeah Yeahs	
25	October 19	"Maps"	Yeah Yeah Yeahs	
25	October 26	"Maps"	Yeah Yeah Yeahs	
25	November 2	"Maps"	Yeah Yeah Yeahs	
25	November 9	"Maps"	Yeah Yeah Yeahs	
25	November 16	"Maps"	Yeah Yeah Yeahs	
25	November 23	"Maps"	Yeah Yeah Yeahs	
26	November 30	"Whatchu Kno About Me"	GloRilla and Sexyy Red	
27	December 7	"Rock"	Stepz	
re	December 14	"Maps"	Yeah Yeah Yeahs	
28	December 21	"Like a Prayer (Choir Version)"	I'll Take You There Choir	
29	December 28	"Paper Planes"	M.I.A.	

=== 2025 ===
No.	Issue date	Song	Artist(s)	Ref.
30	January 4	"Last Christmas"	Wham!	
re	January 11	"Paper Planes"	M.I.A.	
31	January 18	"DTMF"	Bad Bunny	
32	January 25	"Tell On Me"	Supa King featuring Kevin Gates	
32	February 1	"Tell On Me"	Supa King featuring Kevin Gates	
33	February 8	"She Will"	Lil Wayne featuring Drake	
34	February 15	"Again"	Fetty Wap	
35	February 22	"Not Like Us"	Kendrick Lamar	
35	March 1	"Not Like Us"	Kendrick Lamar	

== Song milestones ==
=== Most weeks at number one on the TikTok Billboard Top 50 ===
Number of weeks	Artist(s)	Song	Year(s)	Ref.
10	Tommy Richman	"Million Dollar Baby"	2024	
8	Yeah Yeah Yeahs	"Maps"	2024	
6	Mitski	"My Love Mine All Mine"	2023	
4	Flo Milli	"Never Lose Me"	2024	
4	Alek Olsen	"Someday I'll Get It"	2024	
3	Lay Bankz	"Tell Ur Girlfriend"	2024	
3	Clean Bandit featuring Zara Larsson	"Symphony"	2024	

== See also ==
- Hot Trending Songs
- 2020s in music
- Billboard charts
