= Heaven Surrounds You =

2019 indie rock album by Surf Curse

Studio album by Surf Curse
- Released: September 13, 2019
- Genres: Indie rock; garage rock; indie pop
- Length: 37:50
- Label: Danger Collective
- Producer: Jarvis Taveniere

Surf Curse chronology
Nothing Yet (2017)	Heaven Surrounds You (2019)	Magic Hour (2022)

Singles from Heaven Surrounds You
- 1. "Disco" Released: June 12, 2019; 2. "Midnight Cowboy" Released: August 10, 2019; 3. "Hour of the Wolf" Released: August 15, 2019

Heaven Surrounds You is the third studio album by American indie surf rock band Surf Curse. It was released on September 13, 2019.

== Background ==
The record was the first written following the bands relocation from their hometown Reno, Nevada to Los Angeles, California. According to the record's Bandcamp page, the record was inspired by cult films the band "had cherished throughout their young adulthood", featuring many references to these films throughout the track listing. During the summer of 2019, the band held three movie screenings of films that had inspired the record. According to the band, some of the movies and shows they were inspired by include Eraserhead, The Last Days of Disco, Twin Peaks, Hour of the Wolf, Through a Glass Darkly, Maps to the Stars, and Dead Ringers. Every track off of the record was named after one of these cult films. The record was produced by Woods guitarist Jarvis Taveniere during the fall of 2018.

=== Release ===
The record is the final album released on label Danger Collective on September 13, 2019. The record was followed by three singles, the lead single "Disco" was released on June 12, 2019, "Midnight Cowboy" was released on August 10, 2019, and "Hour of the Wolf", which was released on August 15, 2019.

== Reception ==
Professional ratings
Review scores
Source	Rating
No Ripcord	7/10
Pitchfork	6.5/10

Abby Jones of Pitchfork enjoyed the record, giving it a 6.5 out of 10. They stated that "Disco" was the best track on the record, being reminiscent of Vampire Weekend's debut. Overall, they described the track as invoking "the allure of legendary couple dance scenes, the kind that make you want to fall in love with somebody just so you can replicate the choreography" Outside of that track, they believed that the closest the rest of the album got to matching "Disco" was the eight track "Safe", noting the whirling keyboard refrain worthy of a "climactic montage".

The tracks "Opera" and "Trust" were also noted by them, describing them as "baroque pop eeriness that compliments Rattigan's occultish references" as well as noting the involvement of violinist Eliza Pagg of Pavo Pavo. They stated that the album fell short whenever things got "too plain", calling tracks such as "Labyrinth" and "Dead Ringers" mostly forgettable due to the "dull melody" as well as "Midnight Cowboys" relying on a classic cinema reference to "conjure what Rattigan's uninspired lyricism can't". Overall, they stated that Heaven Surrounds You in its final moments "attempts to deliver profound awareness of mortality", furthermore, stating that "there's likely a far deeper implication behind the clichés—he just needs a more insightful script".

A track-for-track review of the record by Under the Rock of Medium was very positive, believing the record was the best thing the band had released yet. Mike Lesuer of Flood Magazine stated that the record, to spite being in a new location, still sounds like "the West Coast garage rock longingly written two hundred miles from the Pacific and illuminated by the neons of downtown Reno", furthermore, called the album both their most romantic record to date and their uneasiest, "capturing the sounds of Rubeck and Rattigan falling in love with—and recoiling from—the surreality of their new home."

== Track listing ==
All tracks are written by Surf Curse.

Heaven Surrounds You track listing
No.	Title	Length
1.	"Maps to the Stars"	2:38
2.	"Labryinth"	3:08
3.	"Disco"	2:32
4.	"River's Edge"	3:34
5.	"Midnight Cowboy"	3:17
6.	"Hour of the Wolf"	3:05
7.	"Dead Ringers"	2:38
8.	"Safe"	2:11
9.	"Memory"	2:30
10.	"Opera"	4:32
11.	"Trust"	2:47
12.	"Jamie"	4:58
Total length:		37:50

Later prints of this album omit "Disco" from the tracklist.
