= J. A. Moreno =

Music video director (born 1993)

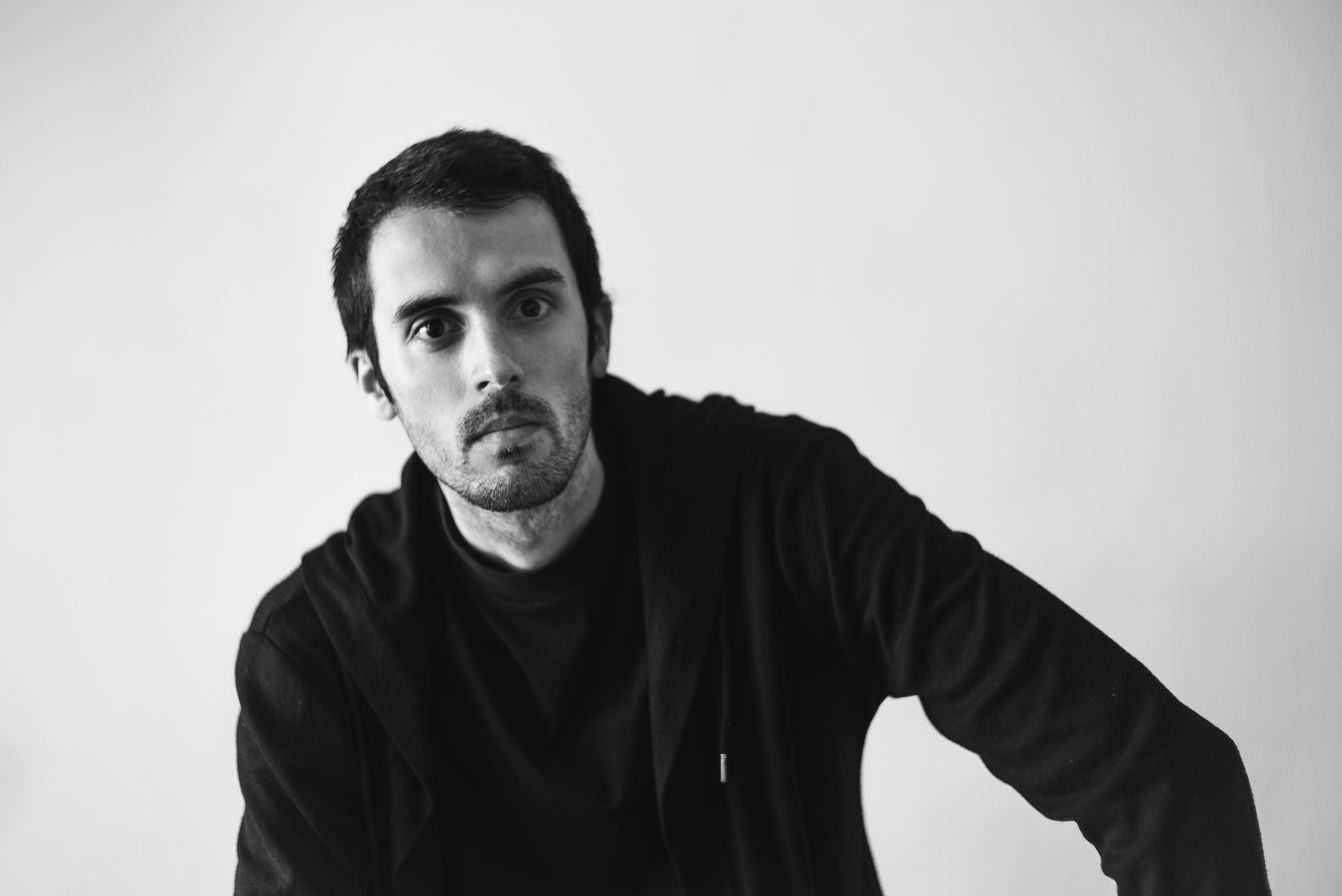
- Moreno in 2020
- Born: July 28, 1993 (age 33); Barcelona, Spain
- Occupation: music video director
- Website: www.jamoreno.tv

J. A. Moreno (/mɔːreɪnɔː/ MORE-rain-OH; born July 28, 1993) is a music video director from Barcelona, Spain known for his work with artists such as Daddy Yanke, Steve Aoki, Sting, will.i.am, Karol G, Camila Cabello, Paris Hilton, Lay Zhang, AGNEZ MO, Farruko, Becky G, Tini, Anitta, CNCO, Paulina Rubio, Dimitri Vegas & Like Mike, Desiigner and Afrojack.

== Early life and career ==
Moreno was born on July 28, 1993, in Barcelona, Spain. Growing up J. A. was inspired by director Nicolas Winding Refn for his artistic style as a director. As a teenager Moreno started filming concert and event videos in the clubs of Barcelona and in 2018 he moved from Barcelona to Los Angeles.

Moreno's first came to prominence in July 2016 when he collaborated with Luka Caro and Juicy M to direct Obey. Afterwards Moreno began collaborating with record labels such as Universal Music, Sony Music, and Spinnin' Records.

Since moving to Los Angeles, he has worked with artists such as Daddy Yankee, Steve Aoki, Sting, will.i.am, Karol G, Camila Cabello, Paris Hilton, Lay Zhang, AGNEZ MO, Farruko, Dimitri Vegas & Like Mike, Desiigner, Afrojack, SHAED and Cheat Codes (DJs).

Since 2023, Moreno has also been based part-time in Seoul, South Korea, where he works as a creative director for emerging and established K-pop acts. His involvement in the Korean music industry has expanded his international footprint and led to creative collaborations across both the U.S. and South Korea.

In South Korea, Moreno has collaborated with several prominent and emerging artists, including Hyunjin of Stray Kids, aespa, Shuhua of (G)I-DLE, AtHeart, Taeyang of BigBang, Gaho, Kang Daniel, BÉBE YANA, and Rovv.

== Filmography ==
=== Music videos ===
Year	Title	Artist(s)	Role
2015	Late at Night	Fernanda Martins	Director
2016	Take My Hand	Marsal Ventura, GEROX	Director
2016	Obey	Juicy M, Luka Caro, Enrique Dragon	Director
2016	Need U Around	Juicy M, Esty Leone	Director
2017	Make Love	Joe Stone	Director
2017	Temple	Blasterjaxx	Director
2017	Come Back To You	Crooked Colours	Director
2018	Addiction	Marsal Ventura, Anmau, Tony T, Alba Kras	Director
2019	Hard Pass	Tritonal (group), Ryann	Director
2019	Diamonds	Tritonal (group), Rosie Darling	Director
2019	Ferrari	Cheat Codes (DJs), Afrojack	Director
2019	Children	MATTN, Klaas, Roland Clark	Director
2019	Cuarteles de Invierno	Andres Calamaro	Director
2019	Mi Ranchera	Andres Calamaro	Director
2019	Rave	Steve Aoki, Showtek, MAKJ	Director
2019	Lone Wolves	MATTN, Paris Hilton	Director
2019	The Flight	Dimitri Vegas & Like Mike, Bassjackers, D'Angello & Francis	Director
2019	2 in a million	Steve Aoki, Sting & SHAED	Director
2020	The Anthem (Der Alte)	Dimitri Vegas & Like Mike vs Timmy Trumpet	Director
2020	Love you more	Steve Aoki, Lay Zhang, will.i.am	Director
2020	2 in a million (Director's Cut)	Steve Aoki, Sting & SHAED	Director
2020	GIRL	Steve Aoki, AGNEZ MO & Desiigner	Director
2020	Falling	Crooked Colours	Director
2021	Float	Anabel Englund	Director
2021	Aire	Steve Aoki & Farruko	Director
2022	Bésame bonito	Carmen DeLeon	Director
2022	La Loto	TINI, Becky G & Anitta	Director
2022	BBB	Carmen DeLeon	Director
2022	Mala Memoria	Carmen DeLeon	Director
2022	Sigo esperando que vuelvas	MC Davo & Santa Fe Klan	Director
2023	Extasis	Alaina Castillo	Director
2023	Volar 'Korean Version'	NAYOON	Director
2023	Jingle Bells	NAYOON	Director
2024	No Tomorrow	NAYOON	Director
2024	Icy on my neck	BÉBE YANA	Director
2025	Infinity	Paris Hilton	Director
2025	Hey Mama	Leroy Sanchez ft. Gaho	Director
2025	Popstars	Daniela Blasco	Director
2025	What are we	Rovv	Director
2025	Starve	Leroy Sanchez	Director
2025	El Toque	Daddy Yankee	Director
2025	Jaque Mate	Tami Tamako	Director
2025	A Nonsense Christmas	AtHeart	Director
2026	Mentira	Daniela Blasco	Director
2026	Cry me a little	Leroy Sanchez	Director
2026	Shut Up	AtHeart	Director
2026	Butterfly Doors	AtHeart	Director
2026	Party Tokyo Style	Tami Tamako	Director
