= After 7 (Lay Bankz album) =

Studio album by Lay Bankz
- Released: May 27, 2024
- Genres: Hip-hop; pop rap; dance
- Length: 34:31
- Label: APG

Lay Bankz chronology
Now You See Me (2023)	After 7 (2024)

Singles from After 7
- 1. "Diamondz n Roses" Released: January 14, 2024; 2. "Tell Ur Girlfriend" Released: February 7, 2024; 3. "Good Look" Released: March 22, 2024; 4. "Would You" Released: July 24, 2024

After 7 is the only studio album by American singer Lay Bankz, released through Artist Partner Group on May 27, 2024. The second single "Tell Ur Girlfriend" peaked at number 58 on the Billboard Hot 100, aided by a viral dance trend on TikTok. Tell Ur Girlfriend was released in support of After 7. The album also features rappers VaporGod and Beam.

== Background and composition ==
The title of After 7 was inspired by Lay Bankz's experience with the number seven throughout her life, including ages, dates, and other significant life events. The lead single "Tell Ur Girlfriend" reached #58 on the Billboard Hot 100 chart, marking Bankz's first entry onto the Billboard charts. Bankz describes this album as her first "big-girl body of work". She noted the authenticity of After 7 saying "...[After 7 is] raw and it’s me and it’s uncut...this project is way more innovative. I really sat down and thought about how I wanted my project to sound and how I wanted it to feel."

== Track listing ==
Track listing and credits adapted from Apple Music and Spotify.

After 7
No.	Title	Writer(s)	Producer(s)	Length
1.	"Tell Ur Girlfriend"	Ink; Johnny Goldstein; Layia Watkins	Johnny Goldstein	2:04
2.	"Would You?"	Goldstein; Watkins; Theron Thomas	Johnny Goldstein	2:35
3.	"BootyPop"	Amir BB; Watkins	Azul Wynter	2:00
4.	"On My Soul"	Daniel Upchurch; Watkins; Nelson Kyle; Roark Bailey	Nellz; Roark Bailey	2:00
5.	"2Bad"	Diego Avendano; Watkins; Matthew Hines; Samuel Ahana; Teron Mason	Diego Ave; Matt Hines; Swish; All Action	2:00
6.	"Diamondz n Roses" (featuring VaporGod)	Jeremey Ortego; Watkins	VaporGod	1:57
7.	"7Days7Nights"	Brittany Coney; Denisia Andrews; Derrick Gray; Watkins; Tina Dunham	Nova Wav; DJ Diamond Kuts	2:45
8.	"How Could You" (featuring Beam)	Hadi Wael Hassan; Jackson Paul LoMastro; Watkins; Tyree Hawkins; Tyshane Thompson	Jack Lamastro; Beam; Tyree; Product.	3:11
9.	"Smooth Criminal"	Watkins; Moises Santos Robalo; Xavier Barrios	$aint Vincent; Project X	2:45
10.	"Double It"	Castle; Goldstein; Watkins	Goldstein	2:04
11.	"Anywayy"	Beck Unruh; Jacob Vasquez Mena; Santos; Watkins	$aint Vincent; Divine; Dreamz	2:50
12.	"Irony"	Bruggen; Watkins	Thom Bridges	2:48
13.	"Rude Gal"	Cristian Luis Colon; Jimmy Q Nguyen; Watkins	Sakii; Smart	1:19
14.	"Good Look"	Derrick Milano; Simon Jonasson; Albin Tengblad; Watkins; Robalo	$aint Vincent; Albin Tengblad; Simon Jonasson	1:54
15.	"Tongue Out Freestyle"	Charles Forsberg; Kyle Buckley; Watkins	Pink Slip; Charley Cooks	2:15
Total length:				34:31

Sample credits

- "Tell Ur Girlfriend" contains an uncredited sample of "Pony", written by Ginuwine, Static Major and Timbaland, as performed by the former.

== Personnel ==
Personnel adapted from Apple Music and Spotify.

Vocals

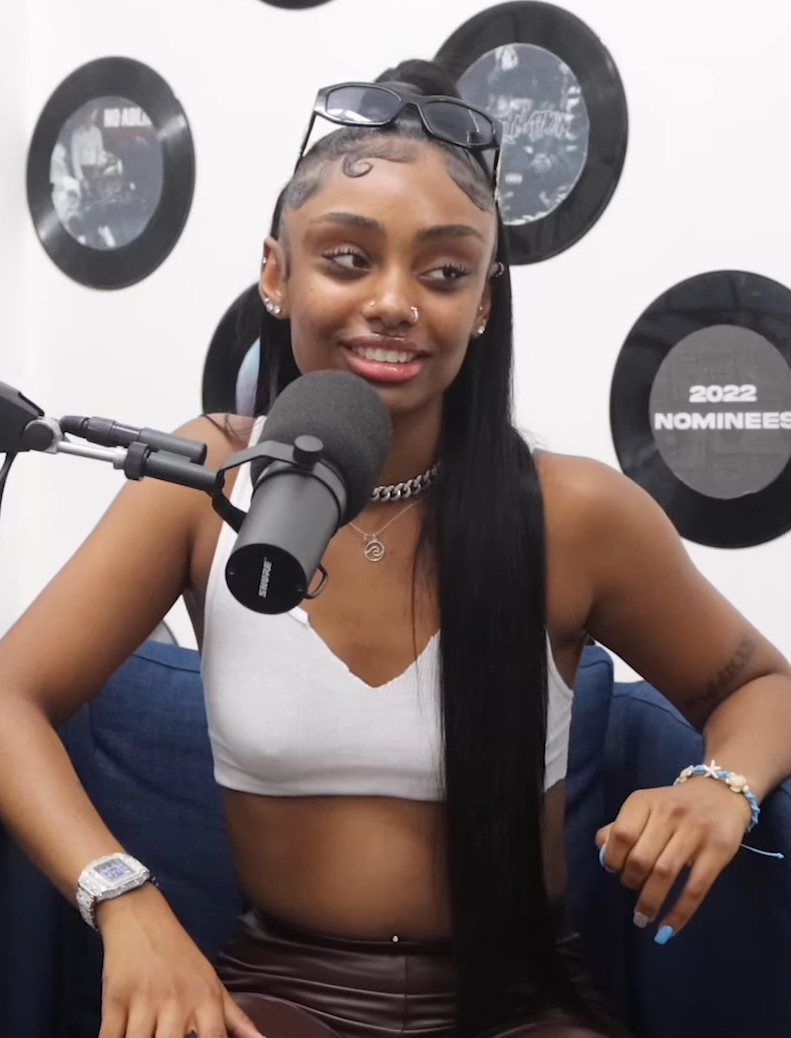
Lay Bankz
- Lay Bankz
- VaporGod
- Beam

Composers and producers

- Johnny Goldstein
- Nellz
- Roark Bailey
- Diego Avendano
- Matt Hines
- DJ Diamond Kuts
- Jack Lamastro
- Beam
- Tyree
- Product.
- $aint Vincent
- Divine Dreamz
- Thom Bridges
- Sakii
- Smart
- Albin Tengblad
- Simon Jonasson
- Pink Slip
- Charley Cooks

Composers

- Lay Bankz
- VaporGod
- Ink
- Theron Thomas
- Amir BB
- Daniel Upchurch
- Samuel Ahana
- Teron Mason
- Jeremy Ortego
- Brittany Coney
- Denisia Andrews
- Derrick Gray
- Tina Dunham
- Hadi Wael Hassan
- Jackson Paul LoMastro
- Tyree Hawkins
- Tyshane Thompson
- Moises Santos Robalo
- Xavier Barros
- Castle
- Beck Unruh
- Jacob Vasquez Mena
- Bruggen
- Cristian Luis Colon
- Jimmy Q Nguyen
- Derrick Milano
- Simon Jonasson
- Albin Tengblad
- Charles Forsberg
- Kyle Buckley

Producers

- Azul Wynter
- Swish
- All Action
- Nova Wav
