= Tell Ur Girlfriend =

2024 single by Lay Bankz

"Tell Your Girlfriend"

Single by Lay Bankz

from the album After 7
- Released: February 7, 2024
- Genre: R&B; synth-pop; hip-hop; Jersey club
- Length: 2:04
- Label: APG
- Songwriters: Atia Boggs; Lay Bankz; Johnny Goldstein
- Producer: Johnny Goldstein

Lay Bankz singles chronology
"Choosin U" (2023)	"Tell Your Girlfriend" (2024)	"Good Luck" (2024)

Music video
- "Tell Ur Girlfriend" on YouTube

"Tell Ur Girlfriend" is a song recorded by American rapper and singer Lay Bankz. It was released through Artist Partner Group on February 7, 2024, as the second single from her debut studio album, After 7 (2024). Atia Boggs and Johnny Goldstein co-wrote the R&B and synth-pop song with hip-hop and dance elements, in which Bankz sings and raps over a Philly club-inspired beat about asking a lover with a girlfriend to tell her about their affair. The song topped the TikTok Billboard Top 50 chart for three weeks starting in April 2024.

A dance trend on TikTok using the song brought it success on streaming platforms; its high streaming numbers led to its appearance on the Billboard Hot 100, where it peaked at number 58. Elsewhere, it peaked at number 33 in Canada and at number 15 in the United Kingdom. She performed the song at Rolling Loud California 2024 on March 15, 2024. The official video premiered on Bankz' YouTube channel on April 23, 2024, and features Bankz dancing in a hair salon to the song.

== Background and release ==
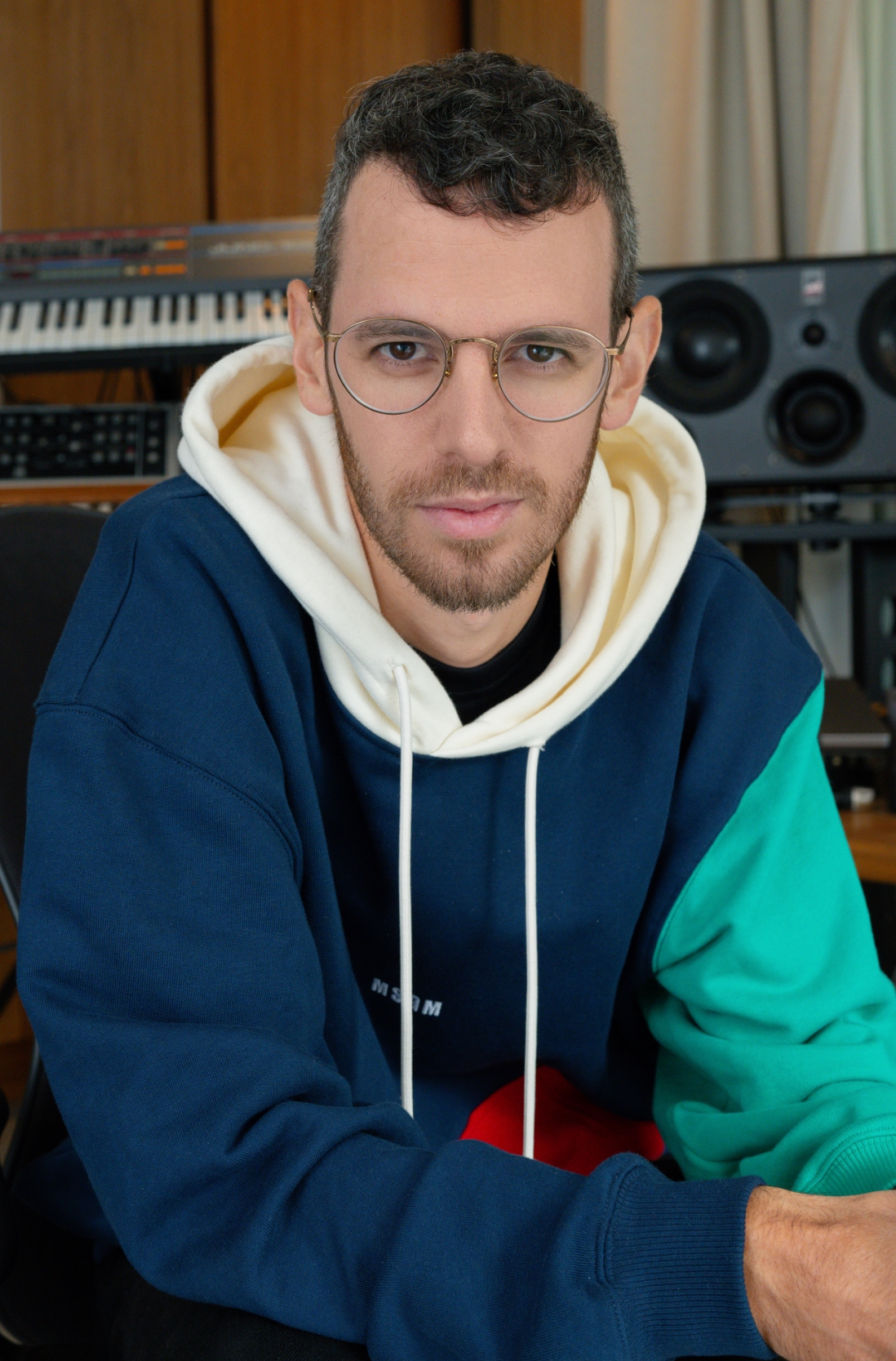
Johnny Goldstein co-wrote and produced "Tell Ur Girlfriend" along with Lay Bankz and Atia Boggs.

Before releasing "Tell Ur Girlfriend", rapper Lay Bankz released her first single through Artist Partner Group, "Left Cheek (Doo Doo Blick)", in 2022; her debut extended play (EP), Now You See Me, in August 2023; and her single "Ick", which was used in over 200 thousand videos on TikTok by 2024. "Tell Ur Girlfriend" was co-written by Bankz with songwriters Atia Boggs and Johnny Goldstein and released as the second single from Lay Bankz's debut studio album After 7, on February 7, 2024. The song first found popularity on TikTok in March 2024 due to a dance trend created by user @who.is.ga6y and popularized by user @laurieluna13, leading to an uptick in streams for the song. By April 2024, the song had been used in over millions of videos on the platform. A music video for "Tell Ur Girlfriend" was filmed in Bankz's hometown of Philadelphia. Another TikTok trend associated with the song focused on her appearance in the video. The official video premiered on Bankz' YouTube channel on April 23, 2024, and features Bankz dancing in a hair salon to the song. As of June 17, 2024 it has over 10 million views.

== Composition and lyrics ==
"Tell Ur Girlfriend"
A 12-second sample of "Tell Ur Girlfriend" by Lay Bankz, where the part of the double-time refrain that accompanied the viral dance challenge is heard, a 90's influenced melodic R&B and synth-pop song with Philly club infused beats and hip-hop and dance elements, taking inspirations from Ginuwine's hit "Pony" and early-mid 2000's Timbaland produced records.

"Tell Ur Girlfriend" is a melodic song with a Philly club-inspired beat, "stuttering" synths, vocal samples, which incorporates 1990s R&B and synth-pop with elements of rap and dance music. Bankz raps during the verses while singing in its double-time chorus. Rosie Long Decter of Billboard Canada called it "Timbaland-inspired" and compared the vocal samples on the song to those on the Ginuwine song "Pony" and the Justin Timberlake song "My Love". Lyrically, it describes Bankz's relationship with a man who is cheating on his girlfriend as she implores him to tell her about their affair before she does.

== Reception ==
=== Commercial ===
"Tell Ur Girlfriend" became Bankz's debut on any Billboard chart after appearing on the Hot R&B/Hip-Hop Songs chart at number 45 for the week dated April 21, 2024. It peaked at number 24 the following week. It also debuted and peaked at number 58 on the Billboard Hot 100 in the week dated April 27, 2024, owing mostly to its high streaming numbers. In Canada, it debuted at number 64 on the Canadian Hot 100 in April 2024 and rose to number 33 the following week. It also peaked at number 15 on the United Kingdom's Official Singles Chart in May 2024 after having debuted on the chart at number 92 the previous month. The song topped the TikTok Billboard Top 50 chart for three weeks starting on April 27, 2024.

=== Critical ===
Uproxx's Wongo Okon called it "a single that is wildly infectious and begs for a few listens before moving on to something else." Vincent Lane of The Garnette Report said it added "layers of serrated synths and space-age squelches of turn-of-the-millennium R&B atop the sliding 808s of drill and insistent five-beat pattern of East Coast Club to create a futuristic, dancefloor-filling anthem."

== Track listings ==
- Streaming/digital download
1. "Tell Ur Girlfriend" – 2:04
- Streaming/digital download – sped up
1. "Tell Ur Girlfriend" (sped up) – 1:52
- Streaming/digital download - slowed
1. "Tell Ur Girlfriend" (slowed) – 2:14
- Streaming/digital download – instrumental
1. "Tell Ur Girlfriend" (instrumental) – 2:04

== Charts ==
=== Weekly charts ===
Weekly chart performance for "Tell Ur Girlfriend"
Chart (2024)	Peak position
Australia (ARIA)	26
Australia Hip Hop/R&B (ARIA)	2
Austria (Ö3 Austria Top 40)	44
Canada (Canadian Hot 100)	33
Czech Republic Singles Digital (ČNS IFPI)	78
Denmark (Tracklisten)	36
Global 200 (Billboard)	40
Greece International (IFPI)	31
Iceland (Tónlistinn)	8
Ireland (IRMA)	16
Lithuania (AGATA)	21
Netherlands (Single Top 100)	22
New Zealand (Recorded Music NZ)	19
Norway (VG-lista)	32
Poland (Polish Streaming Top 100)	63
Portugal (AFP)	146
Romania Airplay (Media Forest)	10
Romania TV Airplay (Media Forest)	12
Slovakia Singles Digital (ČNS IFPI)	47
Sweden (Sverigetopplistan)	65
Switzerland (Schweizer Hitparade)	40
UK Singles (Official Charts)	15
UK Indie (Official Charts)	3
US Billboard Hot 100	58
US Hot R&B/Hip-Hop Songs (Billboard)	17
US Rhythmic (Billboard)	18

=== Year-end charts ===
2024 year-end chart performance for "Tell Ur Girlfriend"
Chart (2024)	Position
US Hot R&B/Hip-Hop Songs (Billboard)	66

== Certifications ==
Certifications for "Tell Ur Girlfriend"
Region	Certification	Certified units/sales
New Zealand (RMNZ)	Platinum	30,000^{‡}
United Kingdom (BPI)	Silver	200,000^{‡}
United States (RIAA)	Platinum	1,000,000^{‡}
^{‡} Sales+streaming figures based on certification alone.
