= Nothing Yet =

2017 album by Surf Curse

Studio album by Surf Curse
- Released: January 13, 2017
- Recorded: 2016
- Studio: Snackhouse Productions, Los Angeles
- Genre: Indie rock; surf rock
- Length: 24:52
- Label: Danger Collective

Surf Curse chronology
Buds (2013)	Nothing Yet (2017)	Heaven Surrounds You (2019)

Professional ratings
Review scores
Source	Rating
ACRN	9/10

Nothing Yet is the second studio album by American indie surf rock band Surf Curse, first released on January 13, 2017, by Danger Collective.

== Background ==
Nick Rattigan and Rubeck described Nothing Yet as a reflection of their lifelong influence by films, stating that the track "The Strange and the Kind" could fit on the soundtrack of a modern Dazed and Confused.

== Reception ==
Ilana Tel-Oren of TheIndiecation enjoyed the record, stating that "there was an anthem for millennials, this would be a front runner". Furthermore, believing that "Jacob Rubeck and Nicholas Rattigan’s music captivate and inspire from open to close" on the record. Overall, they stated that what made the record stand apart is "borderline King Krule attempt" at angsty-vocals and overall "just well-crafted and thought out tracks that are cohesive yet unique in their own way, proving that sometimes simple and low fidelity is better."

Maggie Ewing of Melted Magazine also enjoyed the record, noting that while keeping the sincerity and nostalgia of previous releases, is also more "steam-ready, doling out helpings of the Surf Curse experience that had, beforehand, only been available in live performances". Despite this, they also believed that the record "suffers from the sleek, almost slimy recording quality that afflicts many of their contemporaries in efforts to sound developed and well-composed". Overall, they stated that "once easily labeled as a live band, the kind you had to see in concert to really understand, they diversify both their repertoire and their image with Nothing Yet".

ACRN's Jon Fuchs praised the record, giving it a 9/10. They stated that the record ups the bands production and writing skills, believing it is the best release by the band yet. They described the opener, "Christine F." as a perfect way to start the record, stating that the "repetitive guitar riffs and laid-back feel sets the mood for what's to come". They also believed that "All Is Lost" was the best track Surf Curse had released up to that point. Overall, they described Nothing Yet as a perfect return for the band, "filled with relatable angst and beautiful atmospheres, Surf Curse has proved again to be one of the best bands currently around in West Coast DIY music". Kayla Fernandez of Afterlife Magazine enjoyed the record, believing it was "the perfect album to chill out to, whether it be alone or hanging out with friends". Comparing Nothing Yet to previous releases, they noted "the duo’s growth and a more complete body of songs." Furthermore, stating that "Overall, Surf Curse have kicked off the year to a great start. Keep an eye out for some upcoming shows, they are a must see band."

== Track listing ==
All tracks are written by Nick Rattigan and Jacob Rubeck

Nothing Yet track listing
No.	Title	Length
1.	"Christine F."	1:59
2.	"Doom Generation"	2:26
3.	"The Strange and the Kind"	3:01
4.	"It Followed Me"	2:49
5.	"Cronenberg"	2:26
6.	"Sleeping"	3:25
7.	"Nostalgia"	2:29
8.	"All Is Lost"	2:37
9.	"Falling Apart"	3:40
Total length:		24:52
