= Alaina Castillo =

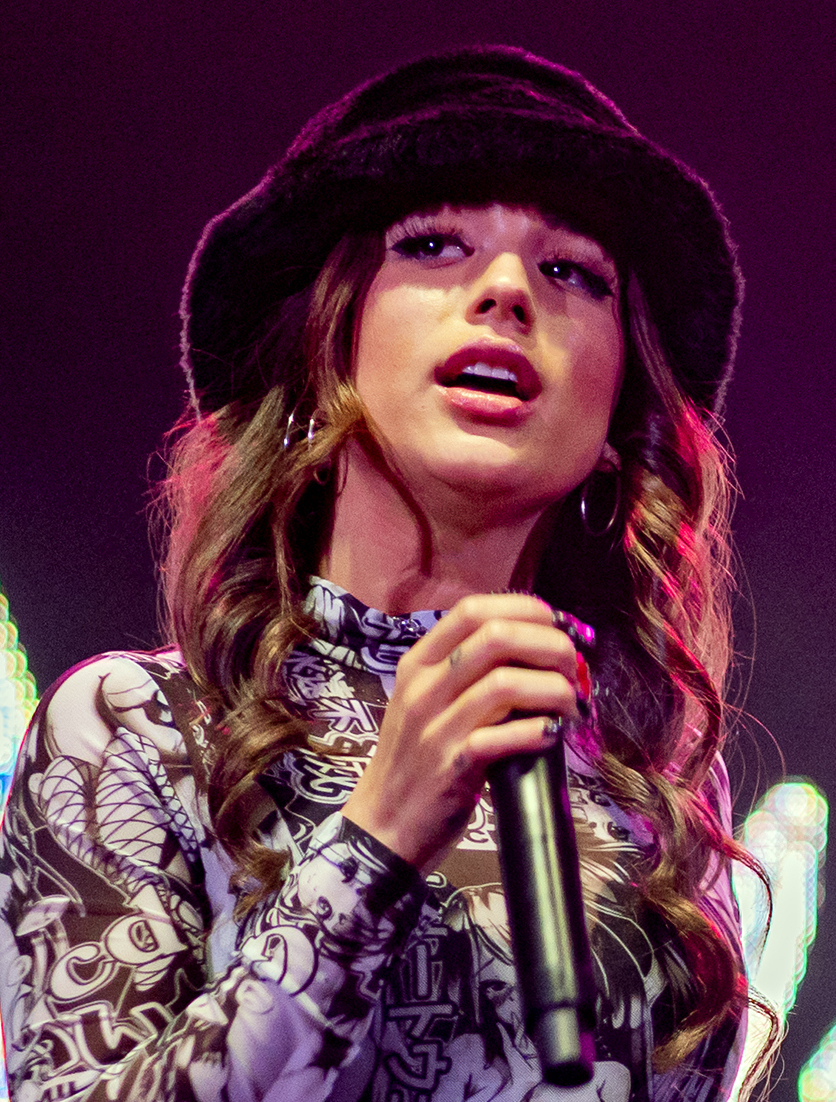
- Castillo in 2022

Background information
- Born: November 16, 1999 (age 26); Houston, Texas, US
- Genres: R&B; dark pop
- Occupations: Singer; songwriter; YouTuber
- Years active: 2018–present
- Label: Chosen People

Alaina Castillo (born November 16, 1999) is an American musician. Born in Houston, Texas, Castillo began to post ASMR-inspired covers of songs on her YouTube channel during her freshman year of high school, and released her first original song in 2018. She has since released six extended plays, and has performed at the 2021 Latin American Music Awards and Coachella 2022. She was the first musician to be featured in the US iteration of RADAR, an artist development program headed by Spotify, and the staff of Billboard called Castillo a "Latin Artist to Watch" in 2021.

== Early life and education ==
Alaina Castillo was born on November 16, 1999 in Houston, Texas, US to a Mexican father and an American mother. Castillo recalled her first musical experience as joining her mother's church choir, leading to her listening primarily to Christian music. However, by middle school, Castillo knew that she did not want to pursue choral singing, and began branching out her music taste to R&B. Castillo attended Clear Falls High School, during which she attempted to teach herself Spanish, her father's native language, by practicing with friends and family. She later began studying biology at the University of Texas at Austin with plans to become a neurosurgeon, but dropped out to pursue her music career.

== Career ==
=== 2018–2019: Early YouTube career and Antisocial Butterfly ===
As a high school freshman, Castillo began posting song covers to YouTube. Noticing that ASMR videos were becoming popular on the platform, she decided to publish ASMR-inspired covers; Castillo described these videos as "lullaby acapella singing, sing you to sleep vibes". These videos received millions of views, yet knowing that she did not want to become cast as an "ASMR artist", Castillo also released original music.

She released her first original song, "Let Me Know" in late 2018; this piqued the interest of the management group Fine Group Entertainment, who helped her connect with the producer Romans. The two began working together, with Castillo releasing her debut EP, Antisocial Butterfly in November 2019 through Romans' label Chosen People. The EP was supported by three singles: her debut single "I Don't Think I Love You Anymore", her first Spanish-language single "No Importa", and "Mentiras".

=== 2020–2021: The Voicenotes and Parallel Universe Pt 1 ===
On March 6, 2020, Alaina Castillo released the single "Ocean Waves". On March 9, 2020, the streaming service Spotify announced that Castillo would be the first artist to be featured in the US iteration of RADAR, their artist development program; Ned Monahan, Spotify's head of global hits, called Castillo a "really interesting artist to start with", citing her appeal to both pop and Latin audiences. This program entailed dedicated marketing support by the company, including a mini-documentary and a set of Spotify Singles recordings. Later that year, on April 24, Castillo released The Voicenotes, her second EP. Inspired by fragments of song ideas recorded onto her phone, the EP was supported by the lead single "Just a Boy". Castillo also released a Spanish-language version of the EP, titled Mensajes de Voz; "Triste Como Yo", included on the EP, was also released as a single. Castillo also released three additional singles in 2020: "Tonight", "¡Párate!", and the Christmas song "Wishlist".

The staff of Billboard included Castillo in their list of the "22 Latin Artists to Watch in 2021", highlighting her bilingualism and nothing she has the "potential to grow in many spaces". On April 16, 2021, Castillo performed the song "Bésame Mucho" at the 2021 Latin American Music Awards. Her fourth EP, Parallel Universe Pt 1, was released on May 14, 2021. Castillo performed "STFU (I Got U)", a single from the album, on Late Night with Seth Meyers on May 17, 2021. She also contributed the song "Lips" to the soundtrack of The L Word: Generation Q.

=== 2022–present: Fantasies and Malos Hábitos ===
Castillo was included in the lineup for Coachella 2022, which ran in late April of that year; she was also the co-opening act for Coldplay on May 8, 2022 during their Music of the Spheres World Tour, alongside H.E.R. Her fifth EP, Fantasies, was released in late 2022, led by the singles "Sad Girls Always Finish First", "Call Me When Ur Lonely", and "Party in My Head (Ur Not Invited)".

In 2023, Castillo released her sixth EP, Malos Hábitos, supported by the singles "Éxtasis" and "Luna de Miel".

== Discography ==
=== Extended plays ===
List of EPs, with selected details
Title	Details
Antisocial Butterfly	Released: November 15, 2019; Format: Digital download, streaming
The Voicenotes	Released: April 24, 2020; Format: Digital download, streaming
Mensajes de Voz	Released: May 22, 2020; Format: Digital download, streaming
Parallel Universe Pt 1	Released: May 14, 2021; Format: Digital download, streaming
Fantasies	Released: October 14, 2022; Format: Digital download, streaming
Malos Hábitos	Released: July 28, 2023; Format: Digital download, streaming

=== Singles ===
Title	Year	Album	Video director(s)	Ref.
"I Don't Think I Love You Anymore"	2019	Antisocial Butterfly	Felicia Manning	
"No Importa"	2019	Antisocial Butterfly	Jose-Emilio Sagaro	
"Mentiras"	2019	Antisocial Butterfly	—	
"Valentine's Day"	2020	Non-album single	—	
"Ocean Waves"	2020	Non-album single	Laura Matikainen	
"Just a Boy"	2020	The Voicenotes	Jake Johnston	
"No Vuelvas a Mirar Atrás"	2020	Mensajes de Voz	—	
"Tonight"	2020	Non-album single	—	
"¡Párate!"	2020	Non-album single	Johnny Chew	
"Wishlist"	2020	Non-album single	Johnny Chew	
"STFU (I Got U)"	2021	Parallel Universe Pt 1	The Reggies	
"Indica"	2021	Parallel Universe Pt 1	The Reggies	
"Pocket Locket"	2021	Parallel Universe Pt 1	Munachi Osegbu	
"Wish You Were Here"	2021	Non-album single	—	
"Lips (Original Music from The L Word: Generation Q)"	2021	Non-album single	—	
"Sad Girls Always Finish First"	2022	Fantasies	—	
"Call Me When Ur Lonely"	2022	Fantasies	Jake Johnston	
"Party in My Head (Ur Not Invited)"	2022	Fantasies	—	
"Éxtasis"	2023	Malos Hábitos	J. A. Moreno	
"Luna de Miel"	2023	Malos Hábitos	Narsés	
"Hookah Envenena"	2023	Malos Hábitos	Narsés	
"Running Water"	2023	Non-album single	—	
"Crush"	2024	Non-album single	—	
"Starz"	2024	Non-album single	—	
"Pretty Little Thing"	2024	Non-album single	—	
"Last Night"	2025	Non-album single	—	
"Blink of an Eye"	2025	Non-album single	—	
"One & Only"	2025	Non-album single	—	
"Used To"	2025	Non-album single	—	
"Love You Right"	2025	Non-album single	—	
