= Carmen DeLeon =

Singer-songwriter

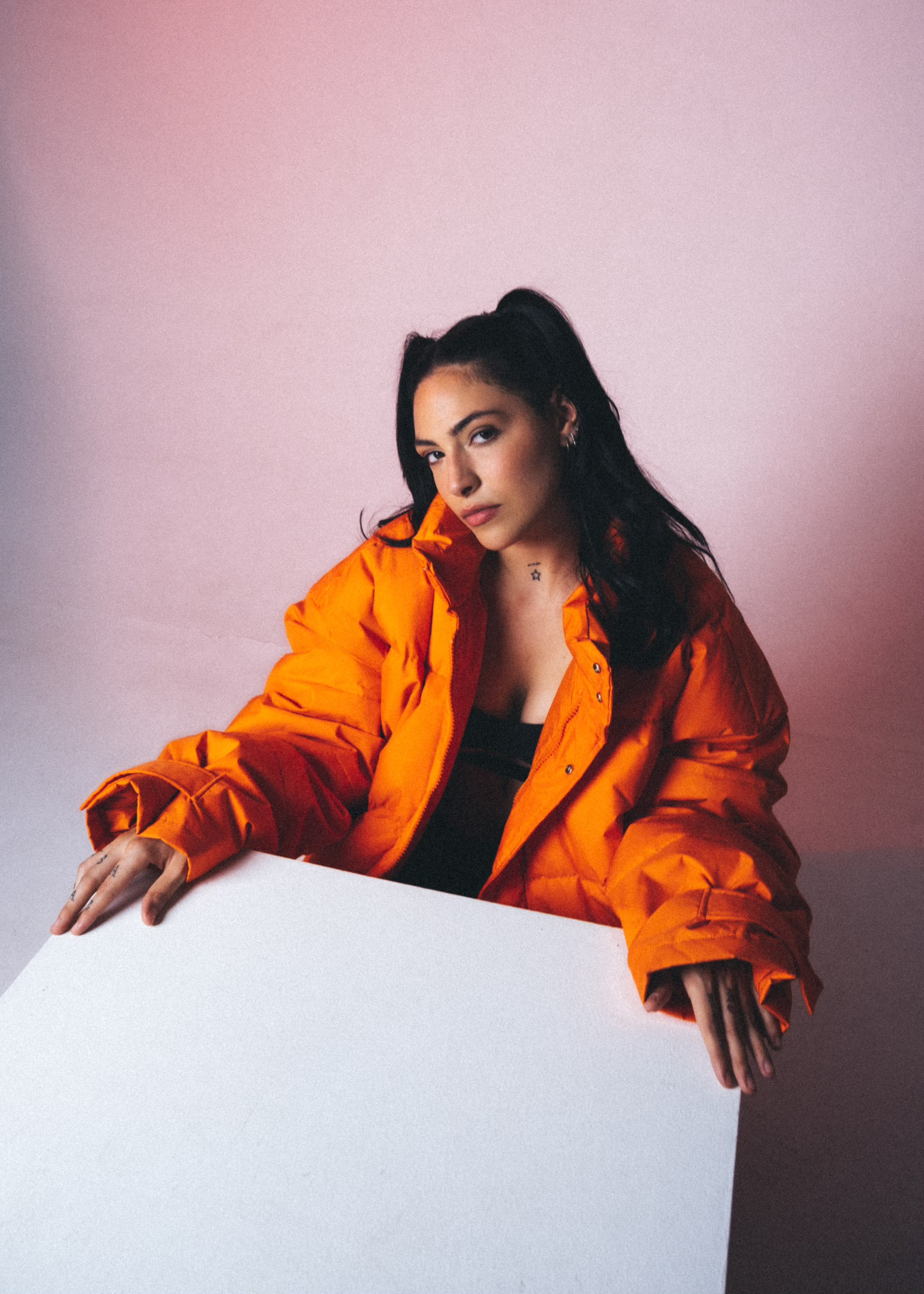

Background information
- Born: April 18, 2001 (age 25); Caracas, Venezuela
- Genres: Pop; Pop Latino
- Occupation: Singer-Songwriter
- Years active: 2020–present
- Labels: Universal Music Latin Entertainment, Capitol Records
- Website: https://carmendeleon.komi.io

Carmen DeLeon (born April 18, 2001, in Caracas) is a Miami-Based, Venezuelan Latin artist, previously signed to Capitol Records/Universal Music Latino.

== Early life ==
Carmen DeLeon was born in Caracas, Venezuela. She began singing at age 4. She and her family relocated to Tampa, Florida when she was 10, and two years later moved to Barcelona, Spain, where she lived for the next six years.

== Career ==
Whiling living in Spain, she found success at 13 years old as a contestant on La Voz Kids which drew in a devoted fan base.

DeLeon’s fan base increased as she posted online covers to her YouTube channel.

In June 2019, she signed with Capitol Records and Universal Music Latin Entertainment. In 2020, she released her debut single, “Volverás”, produced by Puerto Rican producer Tainy. Shortly after, she collaborated with Latin Grammy Award winner Feid to release the song “Juegas". Her interpretation of “He Hit Me (And It Felt Like A Kiss)” by The Crystals was also featured in the 2020 film Promising Young Woman and its accompanying soundtrack.

In 2021, She signed to Warner Chappell Latin for publishing. DeLeon continued to add to her discography with collaborations with DJ/producer L.L.A.M.A and American R&B singer Ne-Yo on the dance-floor anthem, “Shake”, and Cali y el Dandee on “Pasado". She also released "Cafecito", which was inspired by her missing her grandparents.

DeLeon continued to release solo work and collaborations in 2022. Her songs “BBB,” “Mala Memoria,” and "Besame Bonito" (which was also remixed by fellow Venezuelan artist Micro TDH) have garnered 45 million global streams across DSP platforms.

In 2023, DeLeon attended Billboard Mujeres En La Musicia. She was recognized by Billboard and Idolator as an ‘Artist to Watch,’ profiled for the MTV PUSH Radar, and performed at the 2023 PepsiVen Awards where she took home the “Rising Star” award. She also released "Borracha y Cansada", her first release as an independent artist. DeLeon ended 2023 with the release of the highly anticipated single "Que Chimbo" from her upcoming EP which is set to release Q2 of 2024.

== Discography ==
Song	Artist(s)	Release date
Volverás	Carmen DeLeon	August 14, 2020
Juegas (feat. Feid)	Carmen DeLeon, Feid	November 6, 2020
Juegas - Acústica	Carmen DeLeon	December 18, 2020
Cafecito	Carmen DeLeon	January 29, 2021
Shake	L.L.A.M.A, Carmen DeLeon, Ne-Yo	February 19, 2021
Pasado (feat. Cali Y El Dandee)	Carmen DeLeon, Cali Y El Dandee	March 19, 2021
Mariposas	Carmen DeLeon	November 29, 2021
Bésame Bonito	Carmen DeLeon	March 4, 2022
BBB	Carmen DeLeon	April 22, 2022
Mala Memoria	Carmen DeLeon	June 10, 2022
Bésame Bonito (Micro TDH Remix)	Carmen DeLeon, Micro TDH	July 29, 2022
Entre Tú y Yo	Carmen DeLeon	April 21, 2023
Las cosas claras	BIas Cantó, Carmen DeLeon	April 28, 2023
Borracha Y Cansada	Carmen DeLeon	June 9, 2023
Que Chimbo	Carmen DeLeon	December 1, 2023
Idiotas Cuchi	Carmen DeLeon	February 16, 2024

== Personal life ==
As a young adult, DeLeon lived for a year each in Mexico and Los Angeles.
