= Lay Bankz =

American singer (born 2004)

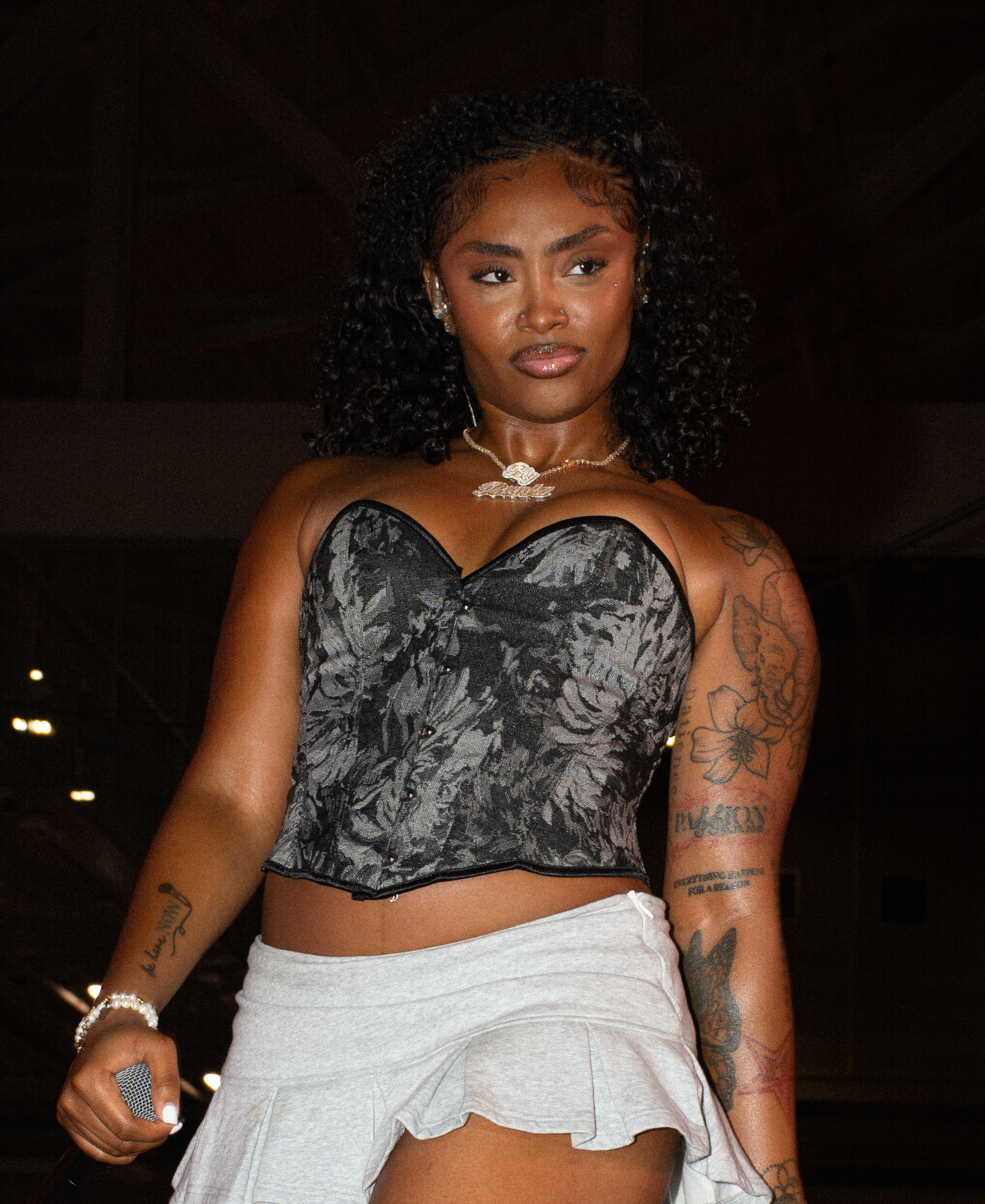
- Bankz in 2025

Background information
- Born: Layia Watkins; June 11, 2004 (age 22); Philadelphia, Pennsylvania, U.S.
- Genres: R&B; hip-hop; Jersey club
- Occupations: Singer; rapper
- Years active: 2019–present
- Label: APG

Layia Watkins (born June 11, 2004), known professionally as Lay Bankz, is an American singer and rapper. After signing a record contract with Artist Partner Group (APG) in 2022, she released the singles "Left Cheek (Doo Doo Blick)", "Na Na Na" and "Ick" the following year. Her 2024 single, "Tell Ur Girlfriend" became popular on TikTok and marked her first entry on the Billboard Hot 100.

== Life and career ==
Layia Watkins was born on June 11, 2004, in Philadelphia, Pennsylvania, and raised in Southwest Philadelphia. Her stage name is derived from her first name, Layia, shortened to Lay, Along with an acronym: "Billionaires Attract Natural Kinetix Zen". She is of Eritrean descent from her mother's side and African American from her father's. She started writing raps at age 10 and released her first song, "Passion", in October 2019 when she was 15 years old. She signed to Artist Partner Group in 2022 and released her debut single with the label, "Left Cheek (Doo Doo Blick)", later that year. She was featured on the "dance mix" of Ciara's song "Da Girls", released in May 2023. She also appeared on NLE Choppa's song "It's Getting Hot" in July 2023.

In August 2023, Bankz released the single "Na Na Na". Both "Left Cheek (Doo Doo Blick)" and "Na Na Na" went viral on TikTok. Her debut extended play, Now You See Me, was also released in August 2023. Her jersey club single "Ick" was released in September 2023 and also became popular on TikTok and on streaming services. She followed that success with the R&B, hip-hop and synth-pop infused single "Tell Ur Girlfriend" in February 2024, which became her first song to chart in the US and multiple other countries aided by a viral dance trend. It followed her debut studio album, After 7, which was released in May 2024. Lay Bankz posted a video to her YouTube channel on December 17, 2025, titled "RIP Lay Bankz" where she announces an end to her music career.

== Musical style ==
Bankz has described her music as "every kind of genre you could ever think of". Kenyatta Victoria of Essence wrote that she "merges club and R&B music". Billboard's Kyle Denis described it as Jersey club. Pitchfork's H.D. Angel identified her music as East Coast club and pop rap, writing that her voice had an "elegant, almost synthetic quality" to it and that her instrumentals were "busy".

== Discography ==
=== Studio albums ===
Title	Details
After 7	Released: May 27, 2024; Label: APG; Formats: Digital download, streaming

=== Extended plays ===
Title	Album details
Now You See Me	Released: August 9, 2023; Label: APG; Formats: Digital download, streaming
Freshman Grad.	Released: June 21, 2024; Label: APG; Formats: Digital download, streaming

=== Singles ===
==== As lead artist ====
Title	Year	Peak chart positions									Certifications	Album
Title	Year	US	US R&B /HH	AUS	CAN	IRE	NLD	NZ	UK	WW	Certifications	Album
"Passion"	2019	—	—	—	—	—	—	—	—	—		Non-album singles
"Can We Talk"	2020	—	—	—	—	—	—	—	—	—		Non-album singles
"Fly"	2020	—	—	—	—	—	—	—	—	—		Non-album singles
"No Trippin"	2021	—	—	—	—	—	—	—	—	—		Non-album singles
"Personal"	2021	—	—	—	—	—	—	—	—	—		Non-album singles
"Anxious"	2022	—	—	—	—	—	—	—	—	—		Non-album singles
"In My Bag"	2022	—	—	—	—	—	—	—	—	—		Non-album singles
"IDFWY"	2022	—	—	—	—	—	—	—	—	—		Now You See Me
"Left Cheek (Doo Doo Blick)"	2022	—	—	—	—	—	—	—	—	—		Non-album singles
"No More Crying" (featuring Maiya the Don)	2022	—	—	—	—	—	—	—	—	—		Non-album singles
"I Deserve"	2023	—	—	—	—	—	—	—	—	—		Non-album singles
"Throw Dat"	2023	—	—	—	—	—	—	—	—	—		Now You See Me
"Da Girls" (Dance Mix) (with Ciara)	2023	—	—	—	—	—	—	—	—	—		Non-album single
"Na Na Na"	2023	—	—	—	—	—	—	—	—	—		Now You See Me
"Aint Mine" (with Journey Montana)	2023	—	—	—	—	—	—	—	—	—		Non-album single
"Woah" (with Kyle)	2023	—	—	—	—	—	—	—	—	—		Smyle Again
"Reason" (Remix) (with Moxie Raia)	2023	—	—	—	—	—	—	—	—	—		Non-album singles
"Off the Wall"	2023	—	—	—	—	—	—	—	—	—		Non-album singles
"Ick"	2023	—	—	—	—	—	—	—	—	—	RIAA: Gold	Now You See Me
"Sloppy Seconds (Ick, Pt. 2)"	2023	—	—	—	—	—	—	—	—	—		Non-album singles
"Girls Just Wanna"	2023	—	—	—	—	—	—	—	—	—		Non-album singles
"Diamondz n Roses" (with VaporGod)	2024	—	—	—	—	—	—	—	—	—		After 7
"Choosin U" (with Skai)	2024	—	—	—	—	—	—	—	—	—		Non-album single
"Tell Ur Girlfriend"	2024	58	17	26	33	16	22	19	15	40	RIAA: Gold; BPI: Silver	After 7
"Good Luck"	2024	—	—	—	—	—	—	—	—	—		After 7
"Would You"	2024	—	—	—	—	—	—	—	—	—		After 7
"Graveyard"	2024	—	—	—	—	—	—	—	—	—		Non-album singles
"Baddie Decisions"	2025	—	—	—	—	—	—	—	—	—		Non-album singles
"Vitamin P"	2025	—	—	—	—	—	—	—	—	—		Non-album singles
"Penny Pound" (with Sturdyyoungin)	2025	—	—	—	—	—	—	—	—	—		Non-album singles

==== As featured artist ====
Title	Year	Album
"Cmonnn (Hit It One Time) [Pt. 2]" (5star featuring Lay Bankz)	2022	Non-album singles
"Mobbin" (Brock featuring Lay Bankz, Bril, PGS Spence, JMoney, and D Glizz)	2022	Non-album singles
"Past Due" (Killadell featuring Lay Bankz, Clout PRG, and Ghost Underworld)	2022	Non-album singles
"Self Esteem" (Lambo4oe featuring Lay Bankz and 2Rare)	2022	Non-album singles
"Get Back" (Bumble Bee featuring Lay Bankz)	2023	Non-album singles
"Bad" (Lil Ricco featuring Lay Bankz)	2023	Non-album singles
"Just My Friend" (Reagan's World featuring Lay Bankz)	2023	Non-album singles
"Nana vs. Dada" (Mini Boom and D4M Sloan featuring Lay Bankz)	2023	Non-album singles
"Broke My Heart" (Kino featuring Lay Bankz)	2024	If This Is Love, I Want A Refund
"Run!" (Odetari featuring Lay Bankz)	2024	Valorant Sounds Vol. 1
"Everybody Ate" (Cleotrapa featuring Lay Bankz)	2024	Supernova Girl
"Pretty Girls Cry Too" (Culture Jam featuring Lay Bankz, Saweetie and Flo Milli	2024	Non-album singles
"Fabulous" (Blac Chyna featuring Lay Bankz)	2024	Non-album singles
"5, 4, 3 (Pretty Woman)" (S.Coups X Mingyu featuring Lay Bankz)	2025	Hype Vibes

=== Guest appearances ===
List of guest appearances, with other performing artists, showing year released and album name
Title	Year	Artist(s)	Album
"Body"	2022	LilC4	So Much Too Say But Nahh
"PIANO"	2022	Bandmanrill	Club Godfather
"PIANO - Sped Up"	2023	Bandmanrill	Club Godfather (Sped Up)
"SLAYYYYY (SIDE B)"	2023	UPSAHL	UPSAHL PRESENTS: THE PHX TAPES
"Limbo"	2024	Jason Derulo	Nu King
"Boom"	2024	Leaf	Dreamgirl
"Trip Out Remix"	2025	T99zy	Nola to Global
"dollaz n dollaz"	2025	jigitz	all my exes live in brooklyn
