= Surf Curse =

American surf rock band

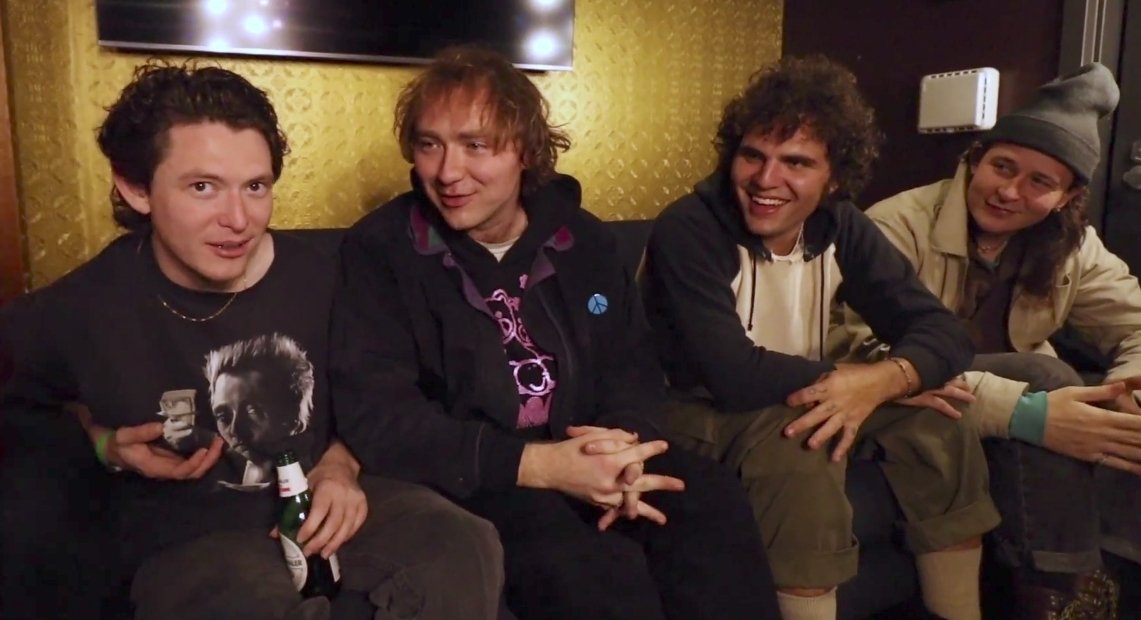
- Surf Curse in December 2022

Background information
- Origin: Reno, Nevada, U.S.
- Genres: Indie surf; surf punk; indie rock; post-punk; garage rock
- Years active: 2012–present
- Labels: Danger Collective; Big Joy; Atlantic
- Members: Jacob Rubeck; Nick Rattigan; Noah Kohll; Henry Dillon
- Website: surfcurse.com

Surf Curse is an American indie surf rock band formed in 2012 in Reno, Nevada, and now based in Los Angeles. The band was formed by Nick Rattigan (lead vocals and drums) and Jacob Rubeck (guitars), and now also includes Henry Dillon and Noah Kholl. The band achieved mainstream success after their song "Freaks", written in 2011 and released in 2013, became popular on the short-form video platform TikTok in 2020.

== History ==
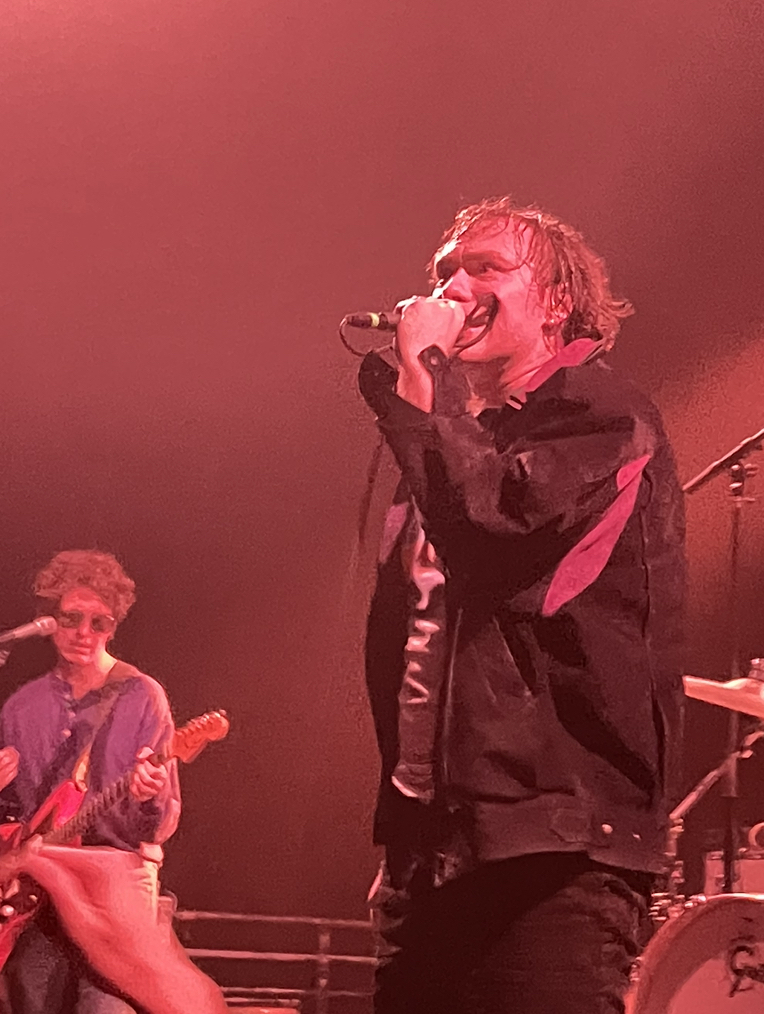
Nick Rattigan (right) and Jacob Rubeck (left) created Surf Curse in 2012.

Surf Curse was formed in 2012 by Nick Rattigan and Jacob Rubeck in Reno, Nevada, under several other names including "Buffalo 66" in reference to the film of the same name. The band soon moved to Los Angeles, where they played at The Smell, a club that welcomed bands with similar sounds to that of Surf Curse's punk-surf rock. There, they became a part of the local all-ages punk scene. Rattigan continued working on his solo project, performing as Current Joys. Also in 2013, the band independently released the EP Sad Boys and their debut album Buds. The latter featured the song "Freaks", written in 2011 when Rattigan and Rubeck were both aged 18.

The band established a growing Los Angeles fanbase, allowing them to play at the October 2016 Beach Goth Festival before an audience that included non-local attendees. Their second album, Nothing Yet, was released in January 2017 through Danger Collective. Rattigan and Rubeck described Nothing Yet as reflecting their lifelong influence by movies, saying that the song "The Strange and the Kind" could fit on the soundtrack of a modern Dazed and Confused. The band remained somewhat successful, albeit underground, through the 2019 release of their third album, Heaven Surrounds You. This third album was praised for Rattigan's vocals and its lead track "Disco", with its fast pace compared favorably to Vampire Weekend's debut, but criticized for reliance on clichés within its lyrics. The lyrics of the album's final song "Jamie" and its repeated line of "I love the people in my life, all my friends keep me alive" have been identified as particularly moving.

With the onset of the COVID-19 pandemic and ensuing lockdowns in 2020, Surf Curse were unable to continue performing live. However, in 2020, the song "Freaks" began drawing attention on the short-form video platform TikTok. The song's angsty lyrics, particularly "I am just a freak", made it compatible with TikTok meme formats that played it in the background. "Freaks" has been described as a "soundtrack [for] whatever you're cringing about", though its second life on TikTok has been distinguished from other songs that saw a resurgence on the app. Generally, songs that received renewed interest through TikTok had been recently featured in movies of television shows, unlike the relative obscurity that "Freaks" had enjoyed. Rattigan said he would have also been happy with the song gaining traction had it been featured on the soundtrack to the then-upcoming film Avatar: The Way of Water. Rubeck joked that the unusual variety of videos featuring the song—including gardening tutorials and thirst traps—meant they "had to just stop watching them". The two said that they neither understood nor used TikTok.

The popularity of "Freaks" came almost simultaneously with accusations that Rattigan and Rubeck engaged in sexual misconduct with fans. Danger Collective severed ties with Surf Curse at the time of the allegations. An anonymous allegation against Rubeck was retracted and two against Rattigan were similarly deleted; both band members denied the allegations. In August 2020, Rubeck stated: "There hasn't been a moment in my life that even comes close to what was described in that post." The allegations were made around the same time that Burger Records, which had organized the 2016 Goth Beach Festival, folded during a wave of similar allegations in the Southern California punk scene.

After being rereleased as a single in May 2021 following the band signing with Atlantic Records, "Freaks" reached number 64 on the UK Singles Chart and number 17 on Billboard's Hot Rock & Alternative Songs, eight years after it first appeared on Buds. The song is RIAA certified Platinum and, as of April 2024, has more than 1 billion streams. Billboard recognized Surf Curse as the second-ranked artists of 2021 in their category New Rock Artists.

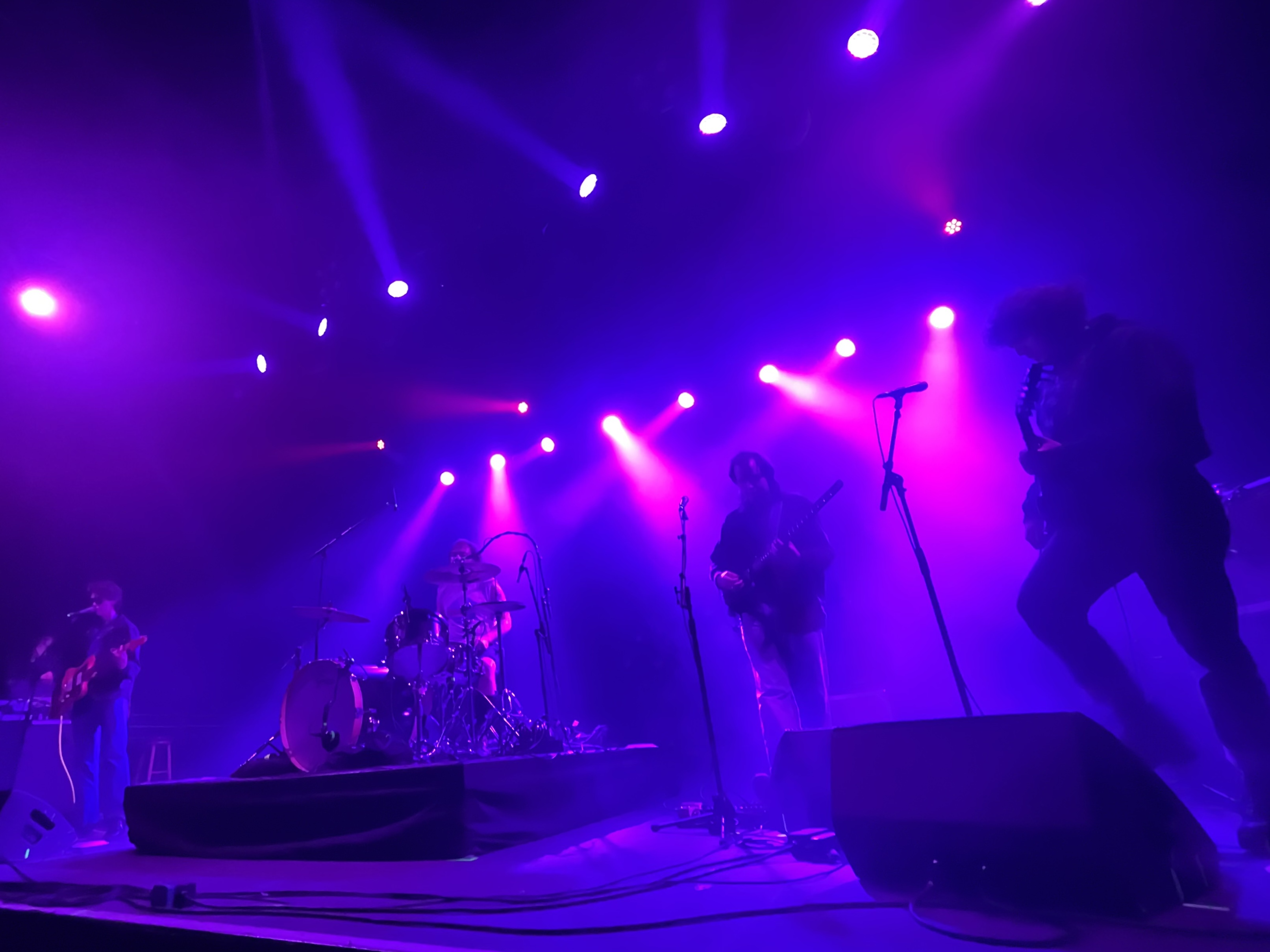
Surf Curse performing in November 2022

Following their signing to Atlantic Records, Surf Curse added bassist Henry Dillon and guitarist Noah Kholl to their lineup. Dillon and Kholl had toured with the band before the pandemic; Rattigan said of adding them: "I think the sort of the connection that me and Jacob felt with each other when we started the band, we also felt with Noah and Henry." As a now four-member band, Surf Curse released Magic Hour in 2022. As with their other album covers that featured the band members, all four are featured on the cover art of the album. The album's release had been preceded by the band performing at Coachella in Wizard of Oz–themed attire and the launch of the album's lead single "Sugar". The band began their North America tour for Magic Hour with a concert in Las Vegas on October 30, 2022, where each band member was dressed as a different iteration of Elvis Presley. Magic Hour was received positively by critics, who identified its lyrics as more creative and a positive evolution of the band's sound and talent.

Similar to "Freaks" virality on TikTok, a new TikTok trend emerged using the band's 2019 single "Disco" in 2024, where two people would dance to the song leaning back and forth to each other along the beat. This trend led the song to number one on the TikTok Billboard Top 50 and its debut at 91 on the Billboard Hot 100 charts in September 2024.

== Musical style ==
Surf Curse's music has been described as surf rock, lo-fi, garage pop, surf punk, post-punk, surf pop, indie rock, indie pop, and jangle pop. The band's live performances have been characterized as "bedlam" and "bonkers", with Rattigan saying that a particularly energetic set at Pappy & Harriet's resulted in the venue banning the band. Jaan Uhelszki, co-founder of Creem magazine, approvingly described Surf Curse as having a "party-tastic kind of music".

== Members ==
- Jacob Rubeck – guitars, occasional lead vocals (2012-present)
- Nick Rattigan – lead vocals, drums, percussion (2012-present)
- Noah Kohll – guitars (2020-present)
- Henry Dillon – bass (2020-present)

== Discography ==
=== Studio albums ===
List of studio albums with details
Title	Details
Buds	Released: June 21, 2013; Label: Big Joy, Danger Collective; Format: LP, cassette, digital download, streaming
Nothing Yet	Released: January 13, 2017; Label: Danger Collective; Format: LP, CD, cassette, digital download, streaming
Heaven Surrounds You	Released: September 13, 2019; Label: Danger Collective; Format: LP, CD, cassette, digital download, streaming
Magic Hour	Released: October 7, 2022; Label: Atlantic; Format: LP, CD, cassette, digital download, streaming

=== EPs ===
List of extended plays with details
Title	Details
Sad Boys	Released: October 30, 2013; Label: Big Joy; Format: LP, cassette, digital download, streaming; 6 songs, 17 min 4 sec
Surf Curse on Audiotree Live	Released: September 20, 2017; Label: Audiotree; Format: Digital download, streaming; 6 songs, 15 min 52 sec
Freaks (Remixes)	Released: November 5, 2021; Label: Atlantic Records; Format: Digital download, streaming; 3 songs, 8 min 52 sec

=== Singles ===
List of singles, showing year released and album title
Title	Year	Peak chart positions										Certifications	Album
Title	Year	US	US Rock	AUS	CAN	IRL	LTU	POR	SK	UK	WW	Certifications	Album
"Disco"	2019	91	14	—	100	57	60	—	—	56	183	RIAA: Gold; BPI: Silver	Heaven Surrounds You
"Midnight Cowboy"	2019	—	—	—	—	—	—	—	—	—	—		Heaven Surrounds You
"Hour of the Wolf"	2019	—	—	—	—	—	—	—	—	—	—		Heaven Surrounds You
"Freaks" (Note: "Freaks" appeared on Buds in 2013, but was not released as a single until 2021.)	2021	— (Note: "Freaks" did not enter the Billboard Hot 100, but peaked at number 17 on the Bubbling Under Hot 100 chart.)	10	95	—	60	25	112	45	64	136	RIAA: 3× Platinum; BPI: Platinum	Buds
"Sugar"	2022	—	—	—	—	—	—	—	—	—	—		Magic Hour
"TVI"	2022	—	—	—	—	—	—	—	—	—	—		Magic Hour
"Lost Honor"	2022	—	—	—	—	—	—	—	—	—	—		Magic Hour
"Self Portrait"	2022	—	—	—	—	—	—	—	—	—	—		Magic Hour
"Arrow"	2022	—	—	—	—	—	—	—	—	—	—		Magic Hour
"—" denotes a recording that did not chart or was not released in that territory.
