= Freaks (Surf Curse song) =

2013 song and 2021 single by Surf Curse

Single by Surf Curse

from the album Buds
- Written: 2011
- Released: June 21, 2013 (original); May 15, 2021 (single reissue)
- Recorded: 2013
- Genre: Surf rock; post-punk
- Length: 2:27
- Label: Atlantic

Surf Curse singles chronology
"Hour of the Wolf" (2019)	"Freaks" (2013)	"Sugar" (2022)

Music video
- "Freaks" on YouTube

"Freaks" is a song by American surf rock band Surf Curse. It was originally released in 2013, from the band's first studio album Buds. The song was re-released as a single on May 15, 2021, via Atlantic Records. The song later went viral in mid-2021, seeing mass use on social media platforms like TikTok.

== Content ==
The band wrote the song in 2011, but in 2021, the song garnered attention due to Internet memes, gaining more than 200,000 views on TikTok and 200 million streams. Responding to the viral memes, the band's guitarist Jacob Rubeck told American Songwriter: "It's a very strange trajectory. It's been a strange wave". He also described "Freaks" as "a pretty depressing song, but there are a lot of depressed people out there, and people who feel alienated".

Adam Schulz, the band's A&R rep at Atlantic, told Los Angeles Times: "When I heard 'Freaks' for the first time, the thing that stood out to me was how exhilarating the song is, that energy is consistent across the band's catalog, and once you watch videos of the band performing live, you realize it translates even better in real life."

A rerecorded version of the track was featured in Rock Band 4 as purchasable DLC content. This rerecord is currently unavailable on streaming services.

== Delayed success ==
Although the song didn't receive any success when it was released in 2013, it went viral on the internet in 2021, especially on TikTok. Teens had a mixed perception of the song when it first went viral. Some thought it was happy because of the upbeat sound and the "oh yeah, we won" line, despite that being a mishearing of "from everyone," while others related to its sad lyrics about alienation. On October 1, 2021, the song was certified gold by the RIAA, making it their first RIAA certification. On June 14, 2022, just a week before its 9th anniversary, the song was certified platinum by the RIAA. It was certified double and triple platinum on January 7, 2025, making Freaks the band's best-selling song.

== Music video ==
An accompanying music video was released on August 6, 2021, and directed by the band itself. It features the same rerecorded version as in the Rock Band 4 DLC. They talked about the video via TV News Desk: "We never had any intention to make a music video for 'Freaks', but when the opportunity occurred we knew what it needed to be, we had to make a video set in Charles Burns' Black Hole world, which originally inspired the song. We were lucky to cast our friends and put them in this mutant makeup. We were lucky to capture great moments on film and had an opportunity to make an ode to a graphic novel that heavily inspired us."

== Charts ==
=== Weekly charts ===
Weekly chart performance for "Freaks"
Chart (2021)	Peak position
Australia (ARIA)	95
Czech Republic Singles Digital (ČNS IFPI)	47
Germany Single Trend (Official German Charts)	5
Global 200 (Billboard)	136
Greece (IFPI)	45
Ireland (IRMA)	60
Lithuania (AGATA)	25
Mexico Airplay (Billboard)	26
Netherlands (Dutch Single Tip)	23
Portugal (AFP)	112
Slovakia (Digital Top 100)	45
UK Singles (Official Charts)	64
UK Indie (Official Charts)	10
US Bubbling Under Hot 100 (Billboard)	17
US Hot Rock & Alternative Songs (Billboard)	10
US Rock & Alternative Airplay (Billboard)	33

=== Year-end charts ===
Year-end chart performance for "Freaks"
Chart (2021)	Position
US Hot Rock & Alternative Songs (Billboard)	21

== Certifications ==
Certifications for "Freaks"
Region	Certification	Certified units/sales
Denmark (IFPI Danmark)	Gold	45,000^{‡}
France (SNEP)	Platinum	200,000^{‡}
Italy (FIMI)	Gold	50,000^{‡}
New Zealand (RMNZ)	2× Platinum	60,000^{‡}
Poland (ZPAV)	2× Platinum	100,000^{‡}
Spain (Promusicae)	Gold	30,000^{‡}
United Kingdom (BPI)	Platinum	600,000^{‡}
United States (RIAA)	3× Platinum	3,000,000^{‡}
^{‡} Sales+streaming figures based on certification alone.

== Release history ==
Release history for "Freaks"
Region	Date	Format	Label	Ref.
Various	May 15, 2021	Digital download; streaming	Atlantic	
