= Nick Rattigan =

American musician (born 1992)

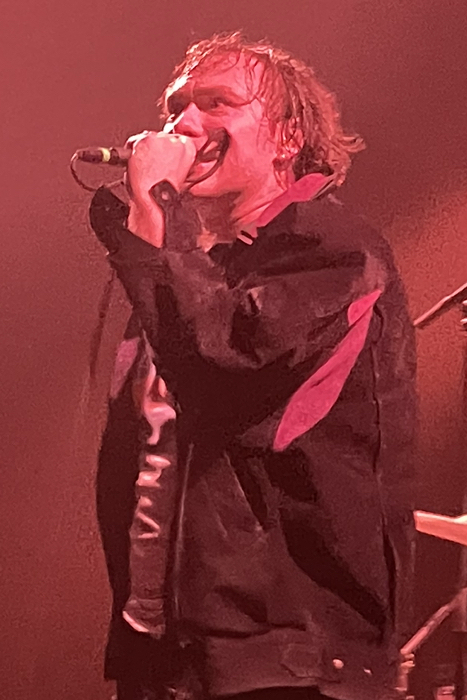
- Rattigan with Surf Curse, 2022

Background information
- Also known as: Current Joys
- Born: Nicholas Foster Rattigan; August 6, 1992 (age 34); Henderson, Nevada, U.S.
- Origin: Reno, Nevada, U.S.
- Genres: New wave; indie rock; experimental; bedroom pop
- Occupations: Musician; songwriter
- Instruments: Guitar; drums; vocals; keyboards
- Years active: 2011–present
- Labels: Danger Collective, Secretly Canadian

Nicholas Foster Rattigan (born August 6, 1992) is an American multi-instrumentalist, singer, and songwriter from Reno, Nevada. He currently releases music under the moniker Current Joys. He also is the drummer and lead singer of the indie surf rock band Surf Curse. As an artist, Rattigan began releasing music as The Nicholas Project from 2011 to 2012, thereafter releasing music as TELE/VISIONS, releasing his debut album, Wild Heart, in January 2013, as well as all of his music on Bandcamp. His second album, 2013, would be released in January 2014.

After 2015, Rattigan began performing as Current Joys, with his third studio album, Me Oh My Mirror, released in February 2015, reflecting the significant change in his style of music.

He released his fourth album, A Different Age, in March 2018. His fifth album, Voyager, was released in May 2021. He released his sixth album, LOVE + POP, in August 2023. The sequel, LOVE + POP Pt 2, was released in May 2024. He released his eighth album, East My Love, in October 2024. His singles "Kids" and "Televisions" were featured in the 2025 horror film Obsession. His ninth album, Rosebud, released in November 2026.

== Career ==
=== 2011–2015 ===
Rattigan started individually writing and releasing music as The Nicholas Project, after an anonymous Myspace message inspired him to compose music. He self-released a slew of independently produced recordings on Bandcamp from November 2011 to October 2012 under the moniker.

As TELE/VISIONS, Rattigan self-released his debut album, Wild Heart, on January 2, 2013. Citing the name change as being influenced by Videodrome, Rattigan said to FORGE Magazine that "I was writing this song and my roommate had given me a drum machine, so I was like "This is perfect! I can start playing live shows!" and they were like "yeah but no one is going to book you with your name as the Nicholas Project" and they were right."

In 2013, Rattigan and classmate Jacob Rubeck, who self-releases music under the moniker Gap Girls (Previously Casino Hearts), formed the band Surf Curse. This surf punk band would be their second major project after a small project named Buffalo 66. Through Big Joy Records, an independent label in Los Angeles, California, they released their debut album, Buds, in June 2013 and the extended play (EP) Sad Boys EP in October.

Three EPs were released in 2013: Young Luv in January, No One Will Dance in February and Neon Gold in June. Also, from May to July 2013, Rattigan wrote for Noisey, a brand under Vice.

An extended play, 2013, was released in January 2014. 2008–2010, a compilation album, was released as the final work under The Nicholas Project in May. A compilation of b-sides and unreleased tracks, B-Sides, Rarities and Demos, was released a month later.

Rattigan wrote for Impose as an intern from September to October 2014.

Found on his YouTube channel, Rattigan has performed under additional names, Franco Years and Devil Worship. Both of these projects can be found on Bandcamp.

=== 2015–present ===
In February 2015, Rattigan announced that the follow-up to Wild Heart was almost complete. The album, Me Oh My Mirror, was then self-released on February 16.

In January 2016, the limited-edition zine Alabama (2000 Light Years) was announced for release in February.

On March 6, 2016, the song "New Flesh" from Wild Heart was used in a short video titled "Flesh" on Vine by Internet celebrity Emma Greer, under her online alias GIBBERTON. The video was her last before her death from cancer twenty-one days later and caused a rise in interest towards the song. Two days later, Rattigan released a song, "Kids", and announced the name change to Current Joys instead of TELE/VISIONS, stating that "I no longer feel like it represents the music I want to make and there are too many conflicts with the band Television which present problems for future prospects." To fit with the change, Rattigan re-released all of his music under the moniker in October.

Rattigan, debuting as a music video director, produced and directed the music video for "123" by the folk punk band Girlpool in March 2017. In July, Rattigan released a second limited-edition zine entitled Days, which came with an unreleased five-song EP. He also collaborated with labelmate BOYO for a 4-track EP, Split, released by Danger Collective and Terrible Records on September 6.

On January 8, "Become The Warm Jets" and "Fear" were released as the lead singles for A Different Age, his debut album on Danger Collective. The music video for "In a Year of 13 Moons", named after a 1978 film by Rainer Werner Fassbinder, was released on January 30 as the third single. In February, the fourth single from the album, "My Nights Are More Beautiful Than Your Days", titled after the film of the same name, premiered on L.A. Record. The album was released on March 2. Within the same month, NPR included "Fear" in "The Austin 100", a playlist of songs from artists performing at SXSW. His 2023 album, LOVE + POP, featured an unexpected feature from popular American rapper and singer Lil Yachty on the track "Gatsby". His 2024 album, LOVE + POP Pt 2, contained collaborations from Gonerville, Brutus VIII, FearDorian, and 1nonly. In October of the same year, he released East My Love. On June 19, Rattigan was featured on Matt Proxy's debut mixtape, titled Trojan Horse.

== Personal life ==
Rattigan was born in Henderson, Nevada, but moved to Reno for education. Early in his career, he moved to Brooklyn, New York. He now currently resides in Los Angeles, California and Dallas, Texas.

According to Rattigan, he taught himself guitar mostly through online guitar tabs for artists such as System of a Down and Flogging Molly. He also took drum lessons when he was eight years old.

Rattigan has revealed that he suffers from a form of generalized anxiety disorder.

== Discography ==
=== Studio albums ===
- Wild Heart (2013)
- 2013 (2014)
- Me Oh My Mirror (2015)
- A Different Age (2018)
- Voyager (2021)
- Love + Pop (2023)
- Love + Pop Pt.2 (2024)
- East My Love (2024)
- Rosebud (2026)

=== Compilation albums ===
- B-Sides, Rarities and Demos (2014)

=== Live albums ===
- Current Joys on Audiotree Live (2018)
- Live at Kilby Court (2020)
- The Phantom of the Highland Park Ebell (2021)

=== EPs ===
- Young Luv (2013) (Released as TELE/VISIONS)
- No One Will Dance (2013) (Released as TELE/VISIONS)
- Neon Gold (2013) (Released as TELE/VISIONS)
- Split (2017)
- Covers from Across the Sea (2022)

=== Singles ===
- "Kids" (2015)
- "Shake That Devil" (2021)
- "Cooking" (2022)
