= List of awards and nominations received by Katseye =

Katseye awards and nominations
- Katseye in 2024
Awards and nominations
Award	Wins	Nominations
American Music Awards	3	3
APRA Music Awards	0	2
Berlin Music Video Awards	0	1
Brand of the Year Awards	1	1
Bravo Otto	1	1
BreakTudo Awards	1	4
Filipino Music Awards	0	2
GLAAD Media Awards	1	1
Grammy Awards	0	2
Hanteo Music Awards	0	1
iHeartRadio Music Awards	0	6
Japan Gold Disc Awards	2	2
MAMA Awards	0	1
Melon Music Awards	0	2
MTV Video Music Awards	1	6
Nickelodeon Kids' Choice Awards	1	1
NRJ Music Awards	0	2
Queerties Awards	1	1
SEC Awards	0	2
The Streamer Awards	0	1
TikTok Awards	0	1
Webby Awards	6	6

Totals (Note: Certain award groups do not simply award one winner. They acknowledge several different recipients, have runners-up, and have third place. Since this is a specific recognition and is different from losing an award, runner-up mentions are considered wins in this award tally. For simplification and to avoid errors, each award in this list has been presumed to have had a prior nomination.)
- Wins: 37
- Nominations: 98

Katseye is a girl group formed in 2023 through the reality competition series Dream Academy, a collaboration between Hybe and Geffen Records. The line-up comprises Daniela Avanzini, Lara Raj, Manon Bannerman, Megan Skiendiel, Sophia Laforteza, and Yoonchae Jeung. Since their debut, the group has received several accolades from various international organizations.

In 2024, Vogue named Katseye one of the Acts to Watch. In 2025, the group was nominated for two MTV Video Music Awards, winning Push Performance of the Year for "Touch". They were later listed as one of YouTube's Top Trending Topics of 2025 and named TikTok's Global Artist of the Year. Their viral advertising campaign "Better in Denim" for Gap also earned them multiple honors, including five Webby Awards.

In 2026, Katseye was nominated for the Grammy Award for Best New Artist and the Grammy Award for Best Pop Duo/Group Performance for "Gabriela". That same year, they won all three of their American Music Awards nominations: New Artist of the Year, Breakthrough Pop Artist, and Best Music Video for "Gnarly". They received four nominations at the 2026 MTV Video Music Awards, including Song of Summer for "Hootie Frutti".

== Awards and nominations ==
Name of the award ceremony, year presented, category, nominee(s) of the award, and the result of the nomination
Award	Year	Category	Nominee(s)	Result	Ref.
ADC Awards	2026	Craft in Motion/Film/Editing	Better in Denim	Silver	
American Music Awards	2026	Best Music Video	"Gnarly"	Won	
American Music Awards	2026	Breakthrough Pop Artist	Katseye	Won	
American Music Awards	2026	New Artist of the Year	Katseye	Won	
APRA Music Awards	2026	Most Performed Australian Work (Note: Credited to songwriters Taka Perry, Kota Banks, Caroline Ailin, Omer Fedi, Magnus August Høiberg, and Blake Slatkin.)	"Touch"	Nominated	
APRA Music Awards	2026	Most Performed Pop Work	"Touch"	Nominated	
ARIA Number One Chart Awards	2026	Number One Single	"Animal"	Won	
Berlin Commercial Festival	2024	Craft: Editing	"Touch"	Nominated	
Berlin Commercial Festival	2026	Craft: Editing	"Pinky Up"	Nominated	
Berlin Commercial Festival	2026	Craft: Costume Styling	"Pinky Up"	Nominated	
Berlin Commercial Festival	2026	Craft: Editing	"Iconic by Mistake" (with Le Sserafim and Illit)	Nominated	
Berlin Commercial Festival	2026	Craft: Editing	"Animal"	Nominated	
Berlin Commercial Festival	2026	Craft: Casting	"Animal"	Nominated	
Berlin Commercial Festival	2026	Craft: Costume Styling	"Animal"	Nominated	
Berlin Music Video Awards	2026	Best Art Direction	"Gnarly"	Nominated	
Brand of the Year Awards (Note: The Brand of the Year Awards is an awards ceremony based on nationwide surveys hosted by the Korea Consumer Brand Committee and organized by the Korea Consumer Forum.)	2025	Hot Trend Female Idol	Katseye	Won	
Bravo Otto	2026	International Music	Katseye	Bronze	
BreakTudo Awards	2025	International New Artist	Katseye	Won	
BreakTudo Awards	2025	International Hit of the Year	"Gabriela"	Nominated	
BreakTudo Awards	2026	International Hit of the Year	"Animal"	Pending	
BreakTudo Awards	2026	International Female Group	Katseye	Pending	
Clio Awards	2026	Editing	"Gabriela"	Nominated	
Clio Awards	2026	Editing	"Gnarly"	Silver	
Clio Awards	2026	Partnerships, Sponsorships & Collaborations	Jollibee x Katseye: Bee in the Band	Nominated	
Clio Awards	2026	Partnerships, Sponsorships & Collaborations	Better in Denim	Gold	
Clio Awards	2026	Fashion & Beauty	Better in Denim	Bronze	
The Drum Awards (Note: The Drum Awards is a global awards program which recognizes the best companies and people from across the marketing and communications industry.)	2026	Fashion, Beauty & Luxury	Better in Denim	Gold	
The Drum Awards	2026	Social Media	Better in Denim	Silver	
Filipino Music Awards	2025	People's Choice – International Artist	Katseye	Nominated	
Filipino Music Awards	2026	People's Choice – International Artist	Katseye	Nominated	
GLAAD Media Awards	2026	Outstanding Breakthrough Music Artist	Katseye	Won	
Gold Derby Awards	2026	New Artist of the Year	Katseye	Nominated	
Gold Derby Awards	2026	Group of the Year	Katseye	Won	
Grammy Awards	2026	Best New Artist	Katseye	Nominated	
Grammy Awards	2026	Best Pop Duo/Group Performance	"Gabriela"	Nominated	
Grindr Unwrapped Awards	2024	TV Show of the Year	Pop Star Academy: Katseye	Nominated	
Grindr Unwrapped Awards	2025	Girl Group of the Year	Katseye	Won	
Grindr Unwrapped Awards	2025	Music Video of the Year	"Gabriela"	Nominated	
Grindr Unwrapped Awards	2026	Music Video of the Year	"Hootie Frutti"	Pending	
Grindr Unwrapped Awards	2026	Music Video of the Year	"Iconic by Mistake" (with Le Sserafim and Illit)	Pending	
Grindr Unwrapped Awards	2026	Song of the Year	"Pinky Up"	Pending	
Grindr Unwrapped Awards	2026	Best Wig	"Pinky Up"	Pending	
Grindr Unwrapped Awards	2026	Biggest Gay Gasp	Manon's Hiatus	Pending	
Hanteo Music Awards	2024	Rookie of the Year – Female	Katseye	Nominated	
Hollywood Music Video Awards	2026	Best Choreography	"Gnarly"	Nominated	
iHeartRadio Music Awards	2025	Favorite K-Pop Dance Challenge	"Touch"	Nominated	
iHeartRadio Music Awards	2025	Favorite On Screen	Pop Star Academy: Katseye	Nominated	
iHeartRadio Music Awards	2026	Best Music Video	"Gabriela"	Nominated	
iHeartRadio Music Awards	2026	Favorite TikTok Dance	"Gnarly"	Nominated	
iHeartRadio Music Awards	2026	Favorite Tour Style	The Beautiful Chaos Tour	Nominated	
iHeartRadio Music Awards	2026	Favorite Tour Tradition	"Gnarly" Dance Break	Nominated	
Industry Dance Awards	2025	Favorite Dance Group	Katseye	Won	
Industry Dance Awards	2025	Favorite Pop Star/s	Katseye	Nominated	
Industry Dance Awards	2025	Favorite Dance Song	"Touch"	Nominated	
Industry Dance Awards	2025	Favorite Dance TV Show/Film	Pop Star Academy: Katseye	Nominated	
Industry Dance Awards	2025	Favorite Viral Dance	Better in Denim	Nominated	
Japan Gold Disc Awards	2026	New Artist of the Year (Western)	Katseye	Won	
Japan Gold Disc Awards	2026	Best 2 New Artists (Western)	Katseye	Won	
Las Culturistas Culture Awards	2026	The Las Cultch 30 Under 30	Katseye	Nominated	
Las Culturistas Culture Awards	2026	Most Girls Award	Katseye	Nominated	
Las Culturistas Culture Awards	2026	When Girls Come Together They Can Do Anything Award	"Pinky Up"	Nominated	
Los 40 Music Awards	2026	Best New Artist	Katseye	Nominated	
MAMA Awards	2026	Best Collaboration	"Iconic by Mistake" (with Le Sserafim and Illit)	Nominated	
Melon Music Awards	2025	Best Pop Artist	Katseye	Nominated	
Melon Music Awards	2026	Best Pop Artist	Katseye	Nominated	
MTV Video Music Awards	2025	Push Performance of the Year	"Touch"	Won	
MTV Video Music Awards	2025	Best Group	Katseye	Nominated	
MTV Video Music Awards	2026	Best Group	Katseye	Nominated	
MTV Video Music Awards	2026	Song of Summer	"Hootie Frutti"	Nominated	
MTV Video Music Awards	2026	Best K-Pop	"Pinky Up"	Nominated	
MTV Video Music Awards	2026	Best Choreography	"Pinky Up"	Nominated	
New Music Awards	2026	New Top40/CHR Artist/Group of the Year	Katseye	Nominated	
Nickelodeon Kids' Choice Awards	2026	Favorite Female Breakout Artist/Group	Katseye	Won	
NR1 Video Music Awards	2026	Best International Artist	Katseye	Nominated	
NRJ Music Awards	2025	International Revelation of the Year	Katseye	Nominated	
NRJ Music Awards	2026	International Female Artist of the Year	Katseye	Nominated	
The One Show Awards	2026	Popular Culture Impact	Better in Denim	Merit	
Premios Juventud	2026	Girl Power	"Gabriela" (Young Miko Remix)	Nominated	
Queerties Awards	2026	Breakout Musical Artist	Katseye	Won	
SEC Awards (Note: The SEC Awards, formerly known as the Séries em Cena Awards, is a Brazilian award show that honors achievements in music, film, television, and internet culture in Brazil and globally.)	2026	International Group of the Year	Katseye	Nominated	
SEC Awards	2026	International Song of the Year	"Gabriela"	Nominated	
Shorty Awards	2026	Use of Viral Content	Better in Denim	Won	
Shorty Awards	2026	Retail & E-Commerce	Better in Denim	Won	
Shorty Awards	2026	Brand Partnership	Better in Denim	Nominated	
The Streamer Awards	2025	Best Streamed Collab	Katseye & Pokimane	Nominated	
TAG Awards Chicago (Note: The TAG Awards are annual awards presented by TAG Media Chicago which honor outstanding Filipino and Filipino-American actors, musicians, celebrities, and global talents.)	2026	Global Breakthrough Artist of the Year	Katseye	Won	
TikTok Awards	2025	Breakthrough Artist of the Year	Katseye	Nominated	
Top 50 Music Awards (Note: The Top 50 Music Awards is an online Spanish award platform that celebrates popular national, international, and Latin singers and groups that appear on its own Top 50 charts during the year.)	2026	Best New Artist (International)	Katseye	Won	
Variety Hitmakers Awards	2026	Group of the Year	Katseye	Won	
Webby Awards	2026	Fashion, Beauty & Lifestyle (Video & Film)	Better in Denim	Won	
Webby Awards	2026	People's Voice Award for Fashion, Beauty & Lifestyle (Video & Film)	Better in Denim	Won	
Webby Awards	2026	Viral Marketing (Advertising, Media & PR)	Better in Denim	Won	
Webby Awards	2026	People's Voice Award for Viral Marketing (Advertising, Media & PR)	Better in Denim	Won	
Webby Awards	2026	Viral, Video Remixes & Mashups (Video & Film)	Better in Denim	Won	
Webby Awards	2026	Best Partnership or Collaboration	"Gabriela" (Waymo x Katseye)	Honoree	
YouTube Creator Awards	2024	Silver Creator Award	Katseye	Silver	
YouTube Creator Awards	2024	Gold Creator Award	Katseye	Gold	
YouTube Creator Awards	2026	Diamond Creator Award	Katseye	Diamond	

== Other accolades ==
=== Streaming milestones ===
Name of the achievement, year presented, category, work(s), and the result
Achievement	Year	Category	Work(s)	Result	Ref.
Spotify Plaques	2026	1,000,000,000 Streams	"Gabriela"	Won	

=== Listicles ===
Name of publisher, year listed, name of listicle, and placement
Publisher	Year	Listicle	Placement	Ref.
Billboard	2025	21 Under 21	Placed	
Billboard	2026	21 Under 21	Placed	
Billboard Korea	2025	K-Pop Artist 100	96th	
Gold House	2026	Gold100 List	Placed	
GQ	2026	The Next Kings & Queens of the Streaming Age	Placed	
Harper's Bazaar	2025	The Breakout Stars of 2025	Placed	
The New York Times	2025	The 67 Most Stylish People of 2025	Placed	
People	2026	13 Girl Groups That Changed the Music Industry Forever	Placed	
Spotify	2025	Songs of Summer	Placed ("Gnarly")	
Teen Vogue	2024	12 Girl Groups to Watch in 2024	Placed	
TikTok	2025	Global Artist of the Year	1st	
Variety	2026	Power of Young Hollywood	Placed	
Vogue	2024	The Acts to Watch in 2024	Placed	
YouTube	2025	Top Trending Topics of the Year	Placed	
