= Katseye: Wild Hearts =

- Theatrical release poster
- Directed by: Nadia Hallgren
- Produced by: Lana Barkin; Lauren Cioffi; Mitra Darab; Andrew Ibea; Jay Ihn; Hayan Park; Sarina Roma; Jared Shelton
- Starring: Daniela Avanzini; Lara Raj; Manon Bannerman; Megan Skiendiel; Sophia Laforteza; Yoonchae Jeung
- Production companies: Hybe Corporation; Geffen Records; Interscope Films; Boardwalk Pictures
- Distributed by: Trafalgar Releasing
- Release dates: August 4, 2026 (AMC The Grove 14); August 12, 2026 (United States)
- Running time: 80 minutes
- Country: United States
- Language: English
- Box office: $7 million

Katseye: Wild Hearts is a 2026 American documentary film directed by Nadia Hallgren and produced by Hybe, Geffen, Interscope Films, and Boardwalk Pictures. It began a limited theatrical release worldwide on August 12, preceding their third EP Wild, with distribution by Trafalgar Releasing.

== Plot ==
The film follows Katseye since their debut to current times, featuring interviews, behind-the-scenes moments from important points in their career, such as the 2026 Grammy Awards nominations, Katseye member Manon’s hiatus, or fan reactions such as the Internet's initial reception to "Gnarly".

== Background and development ==
On April 9, 2026, Katseye released "Pinky Up", as a single for a then-unannounced upcoming EP, ahead of their performance at Coachella 2026 the next day. At the conclusion of their second Coachella set, they announced Wild, slated for release on August 14, 2026.

On July 8, 2026, it was announced that Katseye's labels, Hybe and Geffen, together with Interscope Films and Boardwalk Pictures, planned to release a documentary film on August 12, 2026.

The film features member Manon Bannerman, who has been on hiatus since February 2026.

== Release ==
Katseye: Wild Hearts had its world premiere on August 4, 2026, at AMC The Grove 14, in Los Angeles, California.

The film had its worldwide theatrical release with limited screenings on August 12, 2026.

It was made available for streaming on Hulu in the United States and Disney+ internationally on October 16, 2026.

== Reception ==
In the United States, the film debuted in fifth place at the box office with $4 million from 724 screens. In Australia, it also debuted in fifth place with $359k, taking its cumulative total to $454k with advance screenings. In the United Kingdom, it debuted at number seven with £368k across the 3-day weekend, for a £724k total. In Brazil, it opened in sixth place with R$838k. In Italy, it made its debut in seventh place grossing €123k. The film earned $7.5 million in its opening weekend worldwide.
