= Wild (Katseye EP) =

EP by Katseye
- Released: August 14, 2026
- Length: 13:35
- Languages: English; Portuguese
- Labels: Hybe UMG; Geffen
- Producers: "Hitman" Bang; Dwilly; Frants; Omer Fedi; Blake Slatkin; Thom Bridges; Stefan Gräslund; Patrik Berger; Martin Stilling; Jarrad Rogers; Johnny Goldstein; Ross Golan

Katseye chronology
Beautiful Chaos (2025)	Wild (2026)	Katseye: The Dance Breaks (2026)

Singles from Wild
- 1. "Pinky Up" Released: April 9, 2026; 2. "Animal" Released: July 24, 2026; 3. "Hootie Frutti" Released: August 14, 2026

Wild (stylized in all caps) is the third extended play (EP) by girl group Katseye. It was released on August 14, 2026, through Hybe UMG and Geffen Records. Its first single, "Pinky Up", was released on April 9, one week before the EP's announcement date. It was followed by its second single, "Animal", on July 24, and a third single, "Hootie Frutti", was released concurrently with the EP. The release does not feature member Manon Bannerman, who went on a temporary hiatus from the group in February 2026.

Wild received mixed-to-negative reviews, with critics finding it to be incohesive and lacking direction. Nonetheless, the EP was a commercial success, topping the US Billboard 200, the Belgian Albums Chart and Dutch Album Top 100, and reaching the top ten in thirdteen other countries. To promote the EP, Katseye embarked on the Wildworld Tour, scheduled from September 2026 to March 2027.

== Background and release ==
On April 9, Katseye released "Pinky Up", as a single for a then-unannounced upcoming EP, ahead of their performance at Coachella 2026 the next day. At the conclusion of their second Coachella set, they announced Wild, slated for release on August 14, 2026. They considered the project to be a "big departure", both sonically and aesthetically, from their first EP, SIS (Soft Is Strong), stating: "We were not us at all [...] With every release that we put out, the more authentic and raw it gets to us." On July 24, Katseye released "Animal" as the second single of the EP. Leading up to the EP, the film Katseye: Wild Hearts, which follows the group's journey, received a limited theatrical release on August 12. The full EP was released on August 14 along the music video for a third single, "Hootie Frutti".

== Tour ==
On May 13, 2026, Katseye announced a tour for the EP, titled The Wildworld Tour. Spanning forty-four shows across four continents, it started on September 1 in Dublin, Ireland and is set to conclude on March 5, 2027 in Auckland, New Zealand.

== Composition ==
"Pinky Up" contains elements of hyperpop, techno, and dance-pop. It contains a sample of "Meet Her at the Love Parade" by Da Hool. "Animal" was written by Ed Sheeran and Johnny McDaid and produced by Omer Fedi and Blake Slatkin. It is a pop song with a flirtatious theme about the contrast between a person's public image and their private persona. It features plucky acoustic guitars in its production. "Hootie Frutti" is a Brazilian funk and hyperpop song with singing in a "vaguely Brazilian accent" and occasional Portuguese lyrics. The lyrics feature numerous double entendres using food imagery. "Bel Air" is a ballad about conflicting emotions of a previous relationship. The song was originally written in December 2013 by Charli XCX and Noonie Bao for Charli XCX's 2014 album Sucker, but was cut from the album's official release. "That Way" is a song about self-worth and setting boundaries. "Unloveu" was originally released exclusively on the Target-exclusive version of the album's physical edition, but was released to streaming services on October 13, 2026. The song is about the process of emotionally detaching from a toxic relationship. "Unloveu" was co-written by Lara Raj, the first instance of a Katseye member contributing to the group as a lyricist.

== Critical reception ==
Professional ratings
Aggregate scores
Source	Rating
Metacritic	48/100
Review scores
Source	Rating
AllMusic	2.5/5 stars
NME	3/5 stars
Paste	D+
Pitchfork	4.5/10

According to the review aggregator Metacritic, Wild received "mixed or average reviews" based on a weighted average score of 48 out of 100 from 4 critic scores. Rhian Daly of NME wrote that Katseye's sound and direction on the EP felt "remarkably uncertain". Kieran Press-Reynolds of Pitchfork criticized the EP for not bringing them closer to their individual personalities or their vision as a group, stating that it "tries to crank up the moxie and chaos, but it can only paper over an inner emptiness". Paste's Casey Epstein-Gross wrote that the album's songs were "as far from 'authentic' and 'raw' representations of the members' identities as humanly possible". Craig Jenkins of Vulture considered the album to be incohesive and unfocused, describing it as "a war between bittersweet pop" and "deliberately juvenile singles" and that it "struggles to make sure that its recklessness is attached to art that is consistently accomplished". Similarly, Erica Russell of The Guardian felt that the album's "sonic incohesiveness and genre-hopping make for an uneven listening experience", and noted criticism of the sexual content and product placement in the music video for "Hootie Frutti".

== Commercial performance ==
Wild earned 170,000 album-equivalent units in the United States in its first week, comprising 145,000 pure copies, 24,500 streaming-equivalent units (from 26.95 million streams), and 500 track-equivalent units, making it the biggest US debut for a girl group since Danity Kane's Welcome to the Dollhouse (2008). It debuted at number one on the Billboard 200 and on the Top Album Sales chart, while reaching number 19 on the Top Streaming Albums chart. It marked the biggest week for a girl group on the Billboard 200 since the chart switched to measuring album-equivalent units in 2015. Billboard noted that sales were largely driven by the availability of over thirty CD and vinyl variants which contained collectible items. In France, it debuted at number two on the SNEP Albums Chart with 10,200 album-equivalent units.

== Track listing ==
Standard track listing
No.	Title	Writer(s)	Producer(s)	Length
1.	"Pinky Up"	"Hitman" Bang; Frants; David Wilson; Justin Tranter; Magsy; Sorana; Skyler Stonestreet	Bang; Dwilly; Frants; Bart Schoudel^{[v]}	2:11
2.	"Animal"	Omer Fedi; Blake Slatkin; Ed Sheeran; Johnny McDaid	Fedi; Slatkin; Schoudel^{[v]}	2:38
3.	"Hootie Frutti"	Thom Bridges; Rachel West; Amanda Ibanez; Daniela Gonzalez	Bridges; Schoudel^{[v]}	2:20
4.	"Bel Air"	Stefan Gräslund; Patrik Berger; Martin Stilling; Charlotte Emma Aitchison; Kristin Carpenter; Noonie Bao	Gräslund; Berger; Stilling; Jarrad Rogers; Mischke^{[v]}	3:30
5.	"That Way"	Johnny Goldstein; Michael Pollack; Feli Ferraro	Goldstein; Schoudel^{[v]}	2:56
Total length:				13:35

Physical special editions and digital reissue bonus track
No.	Title	Writer(s)	Producer(s)	Length
6.	"Unloveu"	Lara Raj; Amy Allen; Ross Golan	Golan; Raj; Schoudel^{[v]}	3:53
Total length:				17:28

=== Notes ===
- ^{^[v]} signifies a vocal producer

== Personnel ==
Credits adapted from Tidal.

=== Katseye ===
- Daniela Avanzini – vocals
- Lara Raj – vocals
- Megan Skiendiel – vocals
- Sophia Laforteza – vocals
- Yoonchae Jeung – vocals

=== Additional contributors ===
- David Wilson a.k.a. Dwilly – background vocals, drum programming, keyboards, synthesizer (1)
- Sam Sznd – background vocals (1)
- Sorana – background vocals (1)
- Frants – bass, drum programming (1)
- Kyle Miller – engineering (1, 4–5), vocal engineering (6)
- Mark Parfitt – engineering (1)
- Chris Gehringer – mastering engineer (1–6)
- Will Quinnell – mastering second engineer (1–6)
- Austin Seltzer – mixing engineer, programming (1)
- Bart Schoudel – vocal producer (1–3, 5–6), engineering (2)
- Blake Slatkin – background vocals, drum programming, engineer, keyboard (2)
- Ed Sheeran – background vocals, guitar (2)
- Omer Fedi – background vocals, bass, drum kit, drum programming, engineer, guitar, keyboard (2)
- Aaron Steele – drum kit (2)
- Bryce Bordone – engineer (2), mastering second engineer (5)
- Nick Lobel – engineer (2)
- Serban Ghenea – mixing engineer (2, 5)
- Robby De Sá – vocal engineer (2–3)
- Victor Verpillat – additional mixing engineer (3)
- Thom Bridges – drum programming (3)
- Tom Norris – mixing engineer (3)
- Kristin Carpenter – background vocals (4)
- Stefan Gräslund – bass, synthesizer (4)
- Martin Stilling – drum programming, programming, synthesizer (4)
- Patrik Berger – drum programming, programming (4)
- Alex Ghenea – mixing engineer (4, 6)
- Mischke – vocal engineer, vocal producer (4)
- Feli Ferraro – background vocals (5)
- Johnny Goldstein – bass, drum programming, keyboard (5)
- Ross Golan – bass, drum programming, keyboard, synthesizer, background vocals
- Orlando Giannini – additional keyboard (6)

== Charts ==
=== Weekly charts ===
Weekly chart performance for Wild
Chart (2026)	Peak position
Australian Albums (ARIA)	40
Austrian Albums (Ö3 Austria)	2
Belgian Albums (Ultratop Flanders)	1
Belgian Albums (Ultratop Wallonia)	1
Canadian Albums (Billboard)	7
Croatian International Albums (HDU)	2
Czech Albums (ČNS IFPI)	25
Danish Albums (Hitlisten)	16
Dutch Albums (Album Top 100)	1
Finnish Albums (Suomen virallinen lista)	32
French Albums (SNEP)	2
German Albums (Offizielle Top 100)	4
German Pop Albums (Offizielle Top 100)	2
Greek Albums (IFPI)	1
Hungarian Albums (MAHASZ)	14
Irish Albums (Official Charts)	3
Japanese Albums (Oricon)	38
Japanese Hot Albums (Billboard Japan)	97
New Zealand Albums (RMNZ)	4
Norwegian Physical Albums (IFPI Norge)	4
Polish Albums (ZPAV)	4
Scottish Albums (Official Charts)	2
Slovak Albums (ČNS IFPI)	10
South Korean Albums (Circle)	3
Spanish Albums (Promusicae)	3
Swedish Albums (Sverigetopplistan)	15
Swiss Albums (Schweizer Hitparade)	2
Swiss Pop Albums (Schweizer Hitparade)	1
UK Albums (Official Charts)	2
US Billboard 200	1

=== Monthly charts ===
Monthly chart performance for Wild
Chart (2026)	Peak position
South Korean Albums (Circle)	13
