= Marquise Auramornrat =

Thai singer (born 2006)

- Born: Marquise Jadenipit Auramornrat; July 28, 2006 (age 20); Bangkok, Thailand
- Education: Ramona Convent Secondary School
- Occupations: Singer-songwriter; dancer
- Years active: 2023–present
- Musical career
- Genres: Pop; R&B
- Instrument: Vocals
- Years active: 2026–present
- Label: YUPP!

Marquise Jadenipit Auramornrat (Thai: มาร์ควิส ออราภรณ์รัตน์; born July 28, 2006), also known mononymously as Marquise, is a Thai singer-songwriter and dancer. She first gained international recognition as a contestant on the 2023 reality show Dream Academy, co-produced by Hybe and Geffen Records, which concluded with the formation of the girl group Katseye. She later signed with Thai record label YUPP! Entertainment and made her solo debut on June 25, 2026, with the digital single "Dontneedyouanymore".

== Early life ==
Marquise Auramornrat was born on July 28, 2006, in Bangkok, Thailand. She is the niece of Jettamon Malayota, who is the frontman of Thai indie pop band Penguin Villa. She attended Ramona Convent Secondary School while living in California for four years.

== Career ==
=== 2023–2025: Dream Academy and training ===
In August 2023, Marquise was announced as one of 20 finalists selected from over 120,000 global submissions for Dream Academy, a competition series co-produced by Hybe and Geffen Records to form an international girl group. She was the sole representative from Thailand among the 20 contestants, who hailed from countries across Asia, North and South America, Europe and Australia.

The competition aired on YouTube from September 1, 2023, over 12 weeks and consisted of three missions followed by a live finale. In Mission 1, Marquise was placed on the second dance team, performing "OMG" by NewJeans. In Mission 2, which took place at Hybe's training facility in Seoul, she performed "Fearless" by Le Sserafim as part of one of the teams. In Mission 3, she performed "Confident" by Demi Lovato. She advanced through all three missions to reach the live finale on November 17, 2023, where she was among the four contestants eliminated as Katseye was announced as the six-member debut group.

In 2024, Marquise appeared in the Netflix documentary series Pop Star Academy: Katseye, directed by Nadia Hallgren, which documented the full journey of the Dream Academy competition and its aftermath. The series, which covered over 18 months of filming, featured Marquise prominently across its eight episodes alongside the other contestants who did not make the final group.

Following the conclusion of Dream Academy, Marquise returned to Thailand and continued her training for two years.

=== 2026–present: Solo debut ===
In May 2026, it was announced that Marquise had signed an exclusive contract with YUPP! Entertainment, a Thai record label. She made her solo debut on June 25, 2026, with the digital single "Dontneedyouanymore". Her second single, "Ironic", was released on August 4, 2026.

== Discography ==
As a contestant of Dream Academy, Auramornrat participated in the promotional release of the contestants' shared songs for competition. They were performed on November 17, 2023, and released to streaming platforms on August 21, 2024.

=== Singles ===
Title	Year	Album
"Girls Don't Like" (as part of The Debut: Dream Academy)	2024	The Debut: Dream Academy – Live Finale
"All the Same" (as part of The Debut: Dream Academy)	2024	The Debut: Dream Academy – Live Finale
"Dontneedyouanymore"	2026	Non-album singles
"Ironic"	2026	Non-album singles

== Filmography ==
=== Reality shows ===
Year	Title	Role	Network	Ref.
2023	The Debut: Dream Academy	Contestant	YouTube	
2024	Pop Star Academy: Katseye	Herself	Netflix	
