= Weverse Con Festival =

South Korean annual music festival

- 2026 edition poster
- Status: Active
- Genre: K-pop, J-pop
- Frequency: Annual
- Location: South Korea
- Years active: 2023–present
- Inaugurated: 10 June 2023
- Organiser: Hybe
- Website: Official website

Weverse Con Festival is an annual music and fandom festival organised by Hybe, featuring performances by artists from South Korea and other countries, as well as fan experiences and online participation. The festival developed from Hybe's year-end concert events and was established under its current name in 2023. In 2027, it is scheduled to expand outside South Korea for the first time with an edition in New Delhi, India.

== History ==
The festival's origins trace to 2021 New Year's Eve Live Presented by Weverse, an online concert held on December 31, 2020. This was followed by 2022 Weverse Con: New Era, held on December 31, 2021, at KINTEX in Goyang. The events were subsequently developed into the Weverse Con Festival, with the first edition held on June 10–11, 2023, at Olympic Park in Seoul.

The 2023 festival featured 20 artist teams across the KSPO Dome and the 88 Lawn Field. Tomorrow X Together and Enhypen were among the artists performing at the festival, which also included an outdoor Weverse Park programme. The festival attracted nearly 20,000 visitors. The 2024 edition was held on June 15–16 at Inspire Entertainment Resort in Incheon. The 24-team lineup included K-pop, J-pop and independent artists, alongside J.Y. Park as the year's Tribute Artist. J.Y. Park's tribute stage commemorated the 30th anniversary of his debut.

The 2024 festival attracted 22,000 people in person and a further 18,000 online viewers, for a combined audience of approximately 40,000. Foreign attendees accounted for more than half of both the offline and online audiences. The 2025 festival took place on May 31–June 1 at Inspire Entertainment Resort in Incheon. It featured 27 artist teams, the largest lineup in the festival's history at the time, and included a tribute stage for BoA marking the 25th anniversary of her debut. The festival attracted approximately 26,000 attendees. The 2026 edition was held on June 6–7 at Olympic Park in Seoul, using the KSPO Dome and 88 Lawn Field. The festival featured 30 artist teams from South Korea and Japan and drew a combined audience of 34,000 online and offline viewers and attendees. Rain served as the Tribute Artist.

In October 2026, Hybe announced that the 2027 edition would take place in New Delhi, India, on March 27–28, marking the first Weverse Con Festival to be held outside South Korea. The India edition is planned to feature Korean and Indian artists and collaboration stages, and is being co-produced and promoted by BookMyShow Live.

== Concept and development ==
The festival was developed as a hybrid of a K-pop concert and an outdoor music festival. From its first edition in 2023, the event was divided into two main programmes: Weverse Con, an indoor concert programme, and Weverse Park, an outdoor stage held at 88 Lawn Field. Weverse Park used live bands and allowed artists to adapt their performances to the outdoor festival setting, while the festival incorporated additional activities for audiences between performances.

The festival's programming has expanded beyond artists under Hybe to include artists from other labels and countries, reflecting the broader artist community on Weverse. The 2026 edition featured 30 acts from South Korea and Japan, spanning K-pop and J-pop as well as different generations of performers. The event continued to combine indoor and outdoor performances with fan-oriented experiences and online participation through Weverse.

== Format ==
The festival combines live music performances with fan-oriented activities and online participation. Its programming includes the main Weverse Con performances and Weverse Park, an outdoor stage featuring performances across different musical styles. The festival also offers online streaming and other digital participation options, allowing audiences outside the venues to participate in the event. Since 2023, the festival has featured a recurring Tribute Stage dedicated to an established artist. Tribute artists have included Uhm Jung-hwa in 2023, J.Y. Park in 2024, BoA in 2025 and Rain in 2026.

== Participating artists ==
The festival's lineups have expanded in size and diversity since its inaugural edition. The 2023 festival featured 20 artist teams, followed by 24 in 2024, 27 in 2025 and 30 in 2026.

=== 2023 ===
The 2023 lineup comprised &Team, Baekho, BoyNextDoor, BTOB, Bumzu, Dvwn, Enhypen, Fromis 9, Hyolyn, Jeremy Zucker, Lee Hyun, Le Sserafim, Lightsum, Minhyun, Moonchild, NewJeans, Tomorrow X Together, XIA, and Zico.

Uhm Jung-hwa was the festival's first Tribute Artist and performed with Le Sserafim as part of the tribute programme.

=== 2024 ===
The 2024 lineup comprised &Team, 10CM, Billlie, BoyNextDoor, Eunkwang and Hyunsik, Chuu, Enhypen, Fromis 9, Illit, Imase, JD1, Just B, Kim Jae-joong, Kwon Eun-bi, Le Sserafim, Lee Sung-kyung, J.Y. Park, Plave, Seventeen, The New Six, Tomorrow X Together, TWS, XIA, and Yoasobi.

=== 2025 ===
The 2025 lineup comprised 27 artist teams: &Team, 10CM, 82Major, AKMU, BoA, BoyNextDoor, Chuu, Dreamcatcher (JiU, SuA and Yoohyeon), Enhypen, Fifty Fifty, Illit, Jeong Sun-ah, Kyuhyun, Le Sserafim, Lee Mu-jin, Lee Chang-sub, Lightsum, Lun8, Min Kyoung-ah, Nell, Nowadays, P1Harmony, QWER, Tomorrow X Together, Treasure, TWS, and Viviz.

=== 2026 ===
The 2026 lineup comprised 29 artist teams from South Korea and Japan: 82Major, AHOF, Ampers&One, Apink, BoyNextDoor, Enhypen, Ha Hyun-sang, Hwang Min-hyun, Illit, Le Sserafim, Lucy, Plave, P1Harmony, QWER, Soobin, Wendy, &Team, And2ble, aoen, Cortis, CUTIE STREET, Highlight, Kim Jae-joong, Kwon Jin-ah, Lee Chang-sub, Touched, TWS, Yoon San-ha, and Zico.

The 2026 festival also featured Rain as the Tribute Artist.

=== 2027 ===
The 2027 inaugural international edition lineup was announced on October 16, 2026 and set to be held in India. The lineup consists of 15 artist teams from South Korea and India: Bumzu, Dayoung, Enhypen, Eric Nam, Gini, Hwasa, King, Lara Raj of Katseye, Lee Hyun, Le Sserafim, Ranj x Clifr, Reble, Rhea Raj, TXT, DJ Zelo.

== Editions ==
Edition	Date	Venue	City	Artist teams	Attendance
2023	June 10–11, 2023	KSPO Dome and 88 Lawn Field, Olympic Park	Seoul	20	Nearly 20,000
2024	June 15–16, 2024	Inspire Entertainment Resort	Incheon	24	22,000 in person; 18,000 online
2025	May 31–June 1, 2025	Inspire Entertainment Resort	Incheon	27	Approximately 26,000
2026	June 6–7, 2026	KSPO Dome and 88 Lawn Field, Olympic Park	Seoul	30	34,000 combined online and offline
2027	March 27–28, 2027	Outdoor Expo Site, Yashobhoomi	New Delhi	15	TBA

== Reception and impact ==
The festival has expanded in scale since its establishment in 2023. The 2024 edition drew approximately twice the combined online and offline audience reported for the 2023 festival, while the 2025 edition increased the lineup to 27 artist teams. The 2026 and 2027 editions represent a further expansion in the festival's range of performers, with artists from South Korea, Japan and India and acts representing K-pop, J-pop, I-pop, bands, singer-songwriters and virtual artists.
