= Dream Academy =

2023 talent competition web series

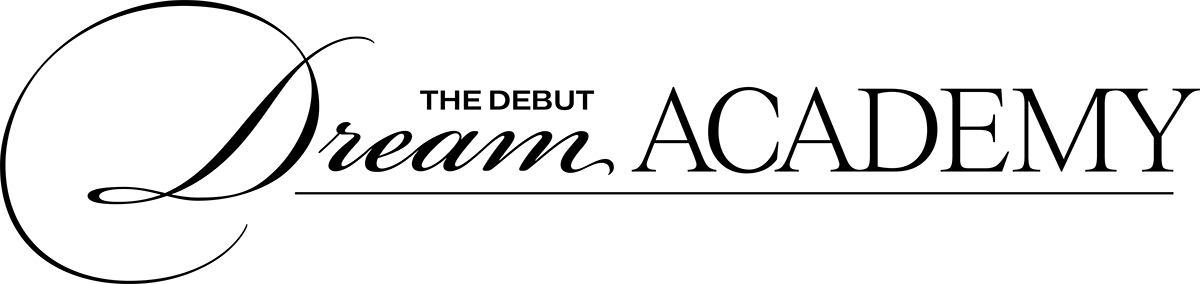
- Also known as: The Debut: Dream Academy
- Genre: Reality television
- Created by: Bang Si-hyuk
- Creative director: Humberto Leon
- Countries of origin: South Korea; United States
- Original language: English
- No. of episodes: 8

Production
- Executive producer: Son Sung-deuk
- Production locations: Los Angeles; Seoul
- Production companies: Hybe Corporation; Geffen Records

Original release
- Network: YouTube
- Release: August 19 – November 17, 2023

The Debut: Dream Academy is a talent competition reality show created as an international collaboration between record labels Hybe and Geffen Records aimed at creating a global girl group. The fan-interactive project involved 20 female candidates from around the world competing in three "missions" to test their artistry. Eliminations occurred after each mission, leaving 10 contestants to compete in the finale, where the group's final members were decided.

According to Hybe Chairman Bang Si-hyuk, the project's intention was to form "an international group based on K-pop methodology". The project was announced on August 28, 2023, premiered later that week on September 1, and finished on November 17, running for a total of 12 weeks. The show concluded with the announcement of the winning six contestants as the girl group Katseye.

== Selection ==
In order to select the 20 candidates competing for a spot in the group, Hybe and Geffen Records launched global auditions online in November 2021. Over 120,000 submissions were received.

=== Voting ===
After each mission performance release, fans were encouraged to vote via Weverse and by liking their favorite contestants' fancams on YouTube. Fan votes were taken into consideration in addition to commentary from experts.

== Missions ==
=== Mission 1 ===
During Mission 1, the 20 contestants were split into four groups–two performing vocals and another two performing choreography. The six contestants with the most fan votes would receive immunity and continue to Mission 2.

Vocal Teams:

1. Paramore's "Still Into You": Celeste, Lara, Nayoung, Samara, and Sophia
2. Robyn's "Dancing on My Own" and Billie Eilish's "Happier Than Ever": Brooklyn, Iliya, Karlee, Lexie, and Manon

Dance Teams:

1. Blackpink's "Pink Venom": Adéla, Daniela, Hinari, Megan, and Ua
2. NewJeans's "OMG": Emily, Ezrela, Marquise, Mei, and Yoonchae

The results were released on September 15, 2023. At the end of the mission, Adéla and Hinari were eliminated.

=== Mission 2 ===
For Mission 2, the girls traveled to the Hybe headquarters in Seoul and received a surprise appearance from Le Sserafim. The 18 contestants were split into four groups, each assigned to sing and dance one of two of Le Sserafim's songs, either "Fearless" or "Antifragile".

1. "Fearless" Team A: Brooklyn, Lexie, Marquise, Mei, and Nayoung
2. "Fearless" Team B: Celeste, Daniela, Ezrela, Manon, and Ua
3. "Antifragile" Team A: Emily, Lara, Sophia, and Yoonchae
4. "Antifragile" Team B: Iliya, Karlee, Megan, and Samara

Results were announced on October 8, with Brooklyn, Iliya, Karlee, and Mei eliminated. On October 21, Dream Academy announced Lexie's decision to withdraw from the competition, which reduced the number of contestants eliminated in the next mission from four to three.

=== Mission 3 ===
Mission 3 entailed group performances that were uploaded on October 28. Centered on artistry, the mission divided the 13 members into three groups to perform three "iconic" songs and an original choreography.

1. Demi Lovato's "Confident": Lara, Marquise, Megan, and Yoonchae
2. The Pussycat Dolls' "Buttons": Celeste, Daniela, Manon, Nayoung, and Sophia
3. Spice Girls' "Wannabe": Emily, Ezrela, Samara, and Ua

The results were released on November 5, with Celeste, Nayoung, and Ua eliminated.

=== Live finale ===
The live finale occurred at XR Studios in Los Angeles, and premiered at 7 PM PST on YouTube on November 17. The remaining 10 contestants performed original songs for the first time. Two songs were performed in teams of five, "Girls Don't Like" and "Dirty Water", as well as a group performance of "All the Same".

Finale Teams:

1. "Girls Don't Like": Daniela, Emily, Marquise, Megan, and Yoonchae
2. "Dirty Water": Ezrela, Lara, Manon, Samara, and Sophia

Early fan voting occurred on Weverse from November 10–17 and then live voting occurred for the first 30 minutes of the finale. Fan votes, a panel of three Hybe/Geffen executives, and the input of both labels' CEOs were used to decide the winners. The six slots in the final girl group, named Katseye, went to Sophia, Lara, Yoonchae, Megan, Daniela, and Manon, eliminating the other four contestants: Samara, Emily, Ezrela and Marquise.

== Netflix series ==
The process of Katseye's creation throughout the series was recorded and released as a Netflix documentary series on August 21, 2024. Pop Star Academy: Katseye was directed by Nadia Hallgren, and explores the contestants' training and development throughout the project. It was produced by Hybe, Interscope Films, and Boardwalk Pictures.

== List of contestants ==
Name	Age	Nationality	Mission 1	Mission 2	Mission 3	Finale points			
Name	Age	Nationality	Voting	Voting	Voting	Pre-voting	Live voting	Judges	Final score
Sophia Laforteza	20	Philippines	2nd	1st	1st	40	10	38.33	88.33
Lara Raj	17	United States	5th	6th	2nd	37	9	36.67	82.67
Daniela Avanzini	19	United States	17th	5th	5th	32	7	40.00	79.00
Yoonchae Jeung	15	South Korea	6th	3rd	12th	34	8	36.00	78.00
Megan Skiendiel	17	United States	10th	9th	11th	24	3	41.33	68.33
Manon Bannerman	21	Switzerland	4th	7th	9th	30	5	33.00	68.00
Samara Siqueira	17	Brazil	3rd	2nd	8th	28	6	32.67	66.67
Ezrela Abraham	20	Australia	9th	10th	4th	26	4	30.00	60.00
Emily Kelavos	17	United States	14th	13th	7th	20	1	36.67	57.67
Marquise Auramornrat	17	Thailand	8th	12th	10th	22	2	33.33	57.33
Nayoung Lee	21	South Korea	1st	4th	3rd	Eliminated			
Celeste Diaz	19	Argentina	11th	8th	6th	Eliminated			
Ua Shimada	15	Japan	13th	14th	13th	Eliminated			
Lexie Levin	19	Sweden	7th	11th	—	Withdrew			
Mei Terada	17	Japan	12th	15th	Eliminated				
Iliya Fedartsova	21	Belarus	16th	16th	Eliminated				
Brooklyn Van Zandt	17	United States	19th	17th	Eliminated				
Karlee Tanaka	19	United States	18th	18th	Eliminated				
Hinari Irie	14	Japan	15th	Eliminated					
Adéla Jergová	19	Slovakia	20th	Eliminated					

The contestant was eliminated
The contestant received enough fan votes to be safe from elimination
The contestant was on a winning team and was safe from elimination
The contestant withdrew before the next mission
The contestant was in the final top six and earned a position in Katseye

== Post-show activities ==
- The top six debuted as Katseye on June 28, 2024.

=== Other contestants ===
- On March 18, 2024, Nayoung Lee was revealed as a contestant on the JTBC survival show Girls on Fire. She placed first in the final episode, making her a member of the show's final lineup. On December 23, 2024, the group's debut was cancelled.
- Mei Terada joined Inkode and debuted as a member of Say My Name on October 16, 2024.
- Several contestants have since released music: Adéla Jergová, Iliya Fedartsova, Brooklyn Van Zandt, and Marquise Auramornrat.
- In July 2025, Karlee Tanaka was a contestant on the Netflix competition show Building the Band. She has released music under the stage name Karlee Girl.
- In August 2025, Emily Kelavos, Samara Siqueira and Lexie Levin were revealed as three of the four members of another Hybe/Geffen girl group, Saint Satine. Levin departed in July 2026.
- In July 2026, Hinari Irie was revealed as a member of Hybe/INCS's South Korean-Japanese girl group, Girls Archives.

== Discography ==
=== Singles ===
Title	Year	Album
"Girls Don't Like"	2024	The Debut: Dream Academy - Live Finale
"Dirty Water"	2024	The Debut: Dream Academy - Live Finale
"All the Same"	2024	The Debut: Dream Academy - Live Finale

== See also ==
- I-Land
- A2K
