= Pinky Up =

Single by Katseye

from the EP Wild
- Released: April 9, 2026
- Genre: Hyperpop; techno-pop; EDM
- Length: 2:11
- Label: Geffen; Hybe UMG
- Songwriters: David Wilson; Justin Tranter; Magsy; Sorana; Skyler Stonestreet
- Producers: "Hitman" Bang; Dwilly; Frants

Katseye singles chronology
"Internet Girl" (2026)	"Pinky Up" (2026)	"Iconic by Mistake" (2026)

Music video
- "Pinky Up" on YouTube

"Pinky Up" (stylized in all caps) is a song by the girl group Katseye. It was released on April 9, 2026, by Hybe UMG and Geffen Records as the lead single from their third EP Wild (2026). It was written by David Wilson, Justin Tranter, Magsy, Sorana, and Skyler Stonestreet, and produced by "Hitman" Bang, Dwilly, and Frants. The song contains a sample from "Meet Her at the Love Parade" by the German DJ Da Hool. The track is Katseye's first single without Manon Bannerman, whose hiatus from the group was announced in February. The song reached the top ten in Lithuania and Singapore, as well as number 22 on the Billboard Global 200.

An accompanying music video directed by Bardia Zeinali was simultaneously released with the single. A choreography video was released on April 14, 2026.

== Background ==
On January 2, 2026, Katseye released the standalone single "Internet Girl".

On April 1, Katseye announced that they would release the single "Pinky Up" on April 9, ahead of their performance at Coachella 2026. The group had previously teased the release with video clips featuring artworks such as the Mona Lisa depicted with their little finger raised. They also included a visual centered on an arcade claw machine, with the claw pulling a sword from a pile of embellished stuffed animals and a single teacup. The cover artwork features a person kneeling on a carpet with a teacup, saucer, and toy cat nearby. A teaser photo was also released showing Lara, Daniela, Sophia, Megan, and Yoonchae wearing Y2K-inspired outfits. Manon, whose hiatus from the group was announced on February 20, was not included in the image teaser.

On April 15, Katseye announced that "Pinky Up" will be included in their upcoming EP, Wild, which will be fully released on August 14, 2026.

== Composition ==
"Pinky Up" is two minutes and 11 seconds. Sonically, it is an uptempo hyperpop and techno-pop track that continues the experimental hyperpop sound previously explored with "Gnarly". Within the production there are elements of EDM and rave music. The song was produced by "Hitman" Bang, David Wilson, and Frants. Lyrically, the song features lyrics of having fun with a carefree attitude and mindset, including many references to the world ending, getting high, being in a state of mind, and raising their pinky fingers up as a declaration.

== Music video ==
The music video for "Pinky Up" was directed by Bardia Zeinali and produced by Roison Moloney. It was released on April 9, 2026, on the official Hybe YouTube channel. The video features a mid-clip break with musician Mel 4Ever, drag queen Vhex, DJ Saturn Risin9, and models Katalina and Vivian Wilson. All five are transgender women. Wilson is the estranged daughter of Elon Musk. During the part where the cameo appearances occur the classical "Queen of the Night" aria from Mozart's Opera "The Magic Flute" can be heard.

As hinted in the teaser, Manon did not participate in the video, making it the group's first as a quintet. A practice video and a storyboard concept clip were leaked in March 2026 showing all six members, including Manon, being incorporated into the video and the choreography.

== Live performances ==
Katseye first performed "Pinky Up" on April 10 at Coachella. They later performed in South Korea on the April 30 broadcast of M Countdown, followed by Show! Music Core on May 2, and Inkigayo on May 3.

== Critical reception ==
Professional ratings
Review scores
Source	Rating
IZM	2/5 stars

Shin Dong-gyu of IZM rated the song 2 out of 5 stars. He described the song as an "afterimage of the trend" and criticized its short length. In June 2026, Billboard listed it as one of the 50 best songs of the year, with Kristen Winseski praising the track's "upbeat melody and highly danceable rhythm" and highlighting how it resonated with fans. In July 2026, Elle also listed "Pinky Up" as one of the 50 best songs of the year, with Samuel Maude writing that the "lyrics are fun, the beat is intoxicating" and declaring the "banger" is "set to become a gay club classic."

== Credits and personnel ==
Credits are adapted from Apple Music.

- Katseye – vocals
- "Hitman" Bang – producer, songwriter
- Austin Seltzer – mixing engineer, programming
- Bart Schoudel – vocal producer
- Chris Gehringer – mastering engineer
- David Wilson a.k.a. Dwilly – songwriter, background vocals, drum programming, keyboards, producer, synthesizer
- Frants – bass, drum programming, producer, songwriter
- Justin Tranter – songwriter
- Kyle Miller – engineer
- Mark Parfitt – engineer
- Colin Magalong a.k.a. Magsy – songwriter
- Sam Sznd – background vocal
- Sorana – background vocal, songwriter
- Skyler Stonestreet – songwriter
- Will Quinnell – assistant mastering engineer

== Charts ==
=== Weekly charts ===
Weekly chart performance
Chart (2026)	Peak position
Argentina Anglo Airplay (Monitor Latino)	13
Australia (ARIA)	19
Austria (Ö3 Austria Top 40)	47
Canada Hot 100 (Billboard)	31
Chile Anglo Airplay (Monitor Latino)	12
Dominican Republic Anglo Airplay (Monitor Latino)	17
Ecuador Anglo Airplay (Monitor Latino)	5
El Salvador Anglo Airplay (Monitor Latino)	8
Estonia Airplay (TopHit)	74
Finland (Suomen virallinen lista)	39
France (SNEP)	108
Germany (GfK)	63
Global 200 (Billboard)	22
Greece International (IFPI)	12
Ireland (IRMA)	18
Japan Hot Overseas (Billboard Japan)	16
Lithuania (AGATA)	5
Netherlands (Single Top 100)	40
Netherlands (Global Top 40)	5
New Zealand (Recorded Music NZ)	20
Norway (VG-lista)	57
Panama Streaming (PRODUCE)	133
Peru Anglo Airplay (Monitor Latino)	15
Philippines Hot 100 (Billboard Philippines)	26
Poland Streaming (OLiS)	58
Portugal (AFP)	47
Puerto Rico Anglo Airplay (Monitor Latino)	13
Singapore (RIAS)	8
Slovakia Singles Digital (ČNS IFPI)	33
South Korea Download (Circle)	139
Sweden (Sverigetopplistan)	59
Switzerland (Schweizer Hitparade)	71
United Arab Emirates (IFPI)	15
UK Singles (Official Charts)	14
US Billboard Hot 100	28
US Hot Dance/Pop Songs (Billboard)	2
Venezuela Anglo Airplay (Monitor Latino)	11

=== Monthly charts ===
Monthly chart performance
Chart (2026)	Peak position
Estonia Airplay (TopHit)	85
Panama Streaming (PRODUCE)	425

== Certifications ==
Certifications for "Pinky Up"
Region	Certification	Certified units/sales
Brazil (Pro-Música Brasil)	Platinum	40,000^{‡}
Canada (Music Canada)	Platinum	80,000^{‡}
United Kingdom (BPI)	Silver	200,000^{‡}
^{‡} Sales+streaming figures based on certification alone.

== Release history ==
Release history for "Pinky Up"
Region	Date	Format	Version	Label	Ref.
Various	April 9, 2026	Digital download; streaming	Original	Hybe UMG; Geffen	
Various	June 5, 2026	Digital download; streaming	The Remixes	Hybe UMG; Geffen	
