= Saint Satine =

Upcoming girl group

- Genre: Pop
- Labels: Hybe UMG; Geffen
- Members: Emily Kelavos; Samara Siqueira; Sakura Tobi
- Website: saintsatine.com

Saint Satine (stylized in all caps) is an upcoming girl group formed by Hybe and Geffen Records. The group consists of three members: Emily Kelavos, Samara Siqueira, and Sakura Tobi. Kelavos and Siqueira initially gained public recognition due to their participation in Hybe and Geffen's previous girl group project, The Debut: Dream Academy, while Tobi joined the line-up by winning a Japanese scouting series, World Scout: The Final Piece.

Saint Satine was originally set to be a four-piece ensemble; Lexie Levin, another Dream Academy participant, departed from the group in July 2026, ahead of their official debut. At the conclusion of World Scout, Saint Satine released "Party B4 the Party", their only song in the planned quartet formation. Hybe and Geffen are yet to release information about the group's official debut following Levin's departure.

== Name ==
The group's name was unveiled as Saint Satine on May 12, 2026, following the conclusion of World Scout: The Final Piece. According to Hybe and Geffen Records, it pairs "Saint" to represent "musicality and charisma", with "Satine" to signify "a softer and more refined image." Prior to the reveal, the group was being referred to as "Prelude", in line with the title of the reveal of the first three members.

== History ==
=== 2023–present: Formation, World Scout: The Final Piece, and Levin's departure ===
Lexie Levin, Samara Siqueira, and Emily Kelavos originally gained public recognition in 2023 as contestants on The Debut: Dream Academy, a global talent search produced by Hybe, Geffen Records that formed the girl group Katseye. Following the program's conclusion, the trio continued under South Korean idol-style training within Hybe's developmental system under the temporary project designation "Prelude".

In August 2025, Hybe and Geffen launched a second phase of international talent scouting, focusing on Japan. The selection process culminated in the survival reality television series World Scout: The Final Piece, which aired exclusively on the Japanese streaming network Abema. The competition narrowed thousands of Japanese applicants down to two finalists, Sakura Tobi and Ayana Kuwahara, ahead of the broadcast finale. In the finale, each finalist performed a song alongside Levin, Siqueira and Kelavos, with Tobi performing "Party B4 the Party" and Kuwahara performing "We Ride". On May 12, 2026, during the live finale, 16-year-old Sakura Tobi was announced as the fourth and final member of the group.

Simultaneously with the final line-up announcement on May 12, 2026, Saint Satine released the studio recording of "Party B4 the Party". The group were set to officially debut in the second half of 2026, until it was announced on July 13, 2026, that Lexie Levin had made the decision to leave the group and part ways with Hybe and Geffen again. Hybe and Geffen are still preparing to debut the group.

== Members ==
=== Current ===
- Emily Kelavos
- Samara Siqueira
- Tobi Sakura

== Discography ==
=== Single albums ===
Title	Details
World Scout: The Final Piece – Finale	Released: May 12, 2026; Label: Hybe UMG, Geffen; Formats: Digital download, streaming

=== Singles ===
Title	Year	Album
"Party B4 the Party"	2026	World Scout: The Final Piece – Finale

== Filmography ==
=== Television ===
Year	Title	Role	Notes
2026	World Scout: The Final Piece	Contestants / Guest performers	Survival show that finalized the group
