= After Maria =

2019 documentary film

- Directed by: Nadia Hallgren
- Starring: Glenda Martes
- Production company: One Story Up Productions
- Distributed by: Netflix
- Release dates: April 28, 2019 (Tribeca Film Festival); May 24, 2019
- Running time: 37 minutes
- Country: United States
- Language: Spanish

After Maria is a 2019 American short documentary film directed by Nadia Hallgren and starring Glenda Martes.

== Summary ==
After Maria follows the families still struggling to pick up the pieces of their shattered life from Hurricane Maria.

== Release ==
It was released on May 24, 2019, on Netflix streaming.

== Cast ==
- Glenda Martes
