= Hootie Frutti =

- Pedro Sampaio remix cover

Single by Katseye

from the EP Wild
- Language: English; Portuguese
- Released: August 14, 2026
- Genre: Pop; Brazilian funk
- Length: 2:20
- Label: Hybe UMG; Geffen
- Songwriters: Thom Bridges; Rachel West; Amanda Ibanez; Daniela Gonzalez
- Producer: Thom Bridges

Katseye singles chronology
"Animal" (2026)	"Hootie Frutti" (2026)	"Unloveu" (2026)

Music video
- "Hootie Frutti" on YouTube

"Hootie Frutti" is a song by girl group Katseye, released on August 14, 2026, through Hybe UMG and Geffen Records, as the third single from their third EP Wild, which was released on the same day. The song reached the top 10 in Singapore as well as number 19 on the Billboard Global 200.

== Release and promotion ==
On August 13, 2026, Katseye announced that they would release "Hootie Frutti", the third single for their third EP, Wild, on August 14, concurrently with the EP. Katseye first performed "Hootie Frutti" on its release day at the Today Summer Concert.

A music video directed by Alfred Marroquin was released alongside the song. It has been described as a "Brazilian dance feast". It features product placements for Tic Tac and Gui Gui. The group shared in an interview with Spotify that it was heavily inspired by the "I'm a Slave 4 U" music video by Britney Spears.

== Compositon and critical reception ==
The song has been described as a blend of Brazilian funk and pop, with "an insistent, Latin-influenced beat". It received mixed reviews, with criticism of the repetitive lyrics and generic sound as well as the product placement and the overly sexual nature of the music video. NME's Rhian Daly described the song as "a fun, infectious piece of pop". Kieran Press-Reynolds of Pitchfork described the song as a "ripoff" of Ice Spice's "Thootie", comparing the track's funk elements to "Paperwork" by ¥$. Erica Russell of The Guardian observed that "Hootie Frutti" was the "most divisive" song on Wild, citing criticism of the sexual content and product placement in the video.

== Credits and personnel ==
Credits are adapted from Apple Music.

- Katseye – vocals
- Thom Bridges – songwriter, producer, percussion
- Rachel West – songwriter
- Amanda Ibanez – songwriter
- Daniela Gonzalez – songwriter
- Bart Schoudel – vocal producer
- Robby De Sá – vocal recording engineer
- Tom Norris – mixing engineer
- Victor Verpillat – assistant mixing engineer
- Chris Gehringer – mastering engineer
- Will Quinnell – assistant mastering engineer
- Yang Ga – immersive mixing engineer

== Charts ==
=== Weekly charts ===
Weekly chart performance for "Hootie Frutti"
Chart (2026)	Peak position
Argentina Anglo Airplay (Monitor Latino)	13
Brazil Hot 100 (Billboard)	92
Canada Hot 100 (Billboard)	32
Czech Republic Singles Digital (ČNS IFPI)	95
El Salvador Airplay (ASAP EGC)	9
France (SNEP)	146
Global 200 (Billboard)	19
Greece International (IFPI)	16
Guatemala Anglo Airplay (Monitor Latino)	12
Honduras Anglo Airplay (Monitor Latino)	9
Ireland (IRMA)	26
Israel (Mako Hitlist)	87
Lithuania (AGATA)	28
Netherlands (Single Top 100)	55
New Zealand (Recorded Music NZ)	30
Nicaragua Anglo Airplay (Monitor Latino)	5
Norway (VG-lista)	91
Panama Streaming (PRODUCE)	78
Peru Anglo Airplay (Monitor Latino)	7
Philippines Hot 100 (Billboard Philippines)	45
Poland Streaming (OLiS)	51
Portugal (AFP)	28
Singapore (RIAS)	6
Slovakia Singles Digital (ČNS IFPI)	26
South Korea Download (Circle)	116
Sweden (Sverigetopplistan)	53
Switzerland (Schweizer Hitparade)	94
United Arab Emirates (IFPI)	13
UK Singles (Official Charts)	16
US Billboard Hot 100	31

=== Monthly charts ===
Monthly chart performance
Chart (2026)	Peak position
Panama Streaming (PRODUCE)	184

== Release history ==
Release history for "Hootie Frutti"
Region	Date	Format	Version	Label	Ref.
Various	August 14, 2026	Digital download; streaming	Original	Hybe UMG; Geffen	
Various	October 2, 2026	Digital download; streaming	Pedro Sampaio remix	Hybe UMG; Geffen	
