= Better in Denim =

2025 Gap commercial

Better in Denim is the fall 2025 advertising campaign by American retailer Gap. Directed by their creative head Calvin George Leung and choreographed by Robbie Blue, it features the Los Angeles-based girl group Katseye dancing to "Milkshake" by American singer Kelis while wearing denim clothing from Gap's fall collection. The ad campaign was seen as culturally refreshing, a callback to older Gap commercials, and a potential response to the advertisements of other clothing retailers.

== History ==
For several decades, Gap produced ad campaigns involving dance and music. In 2025, the clothing retailer sought to pursue advertising strategies that played into consumer nostalgia for such past; specifically, they rereleased "vintage Gap pieces to its site" for, and replicated "the feeling of old campaigns" through collaborations with Troye Sivan, Tyla, and others.

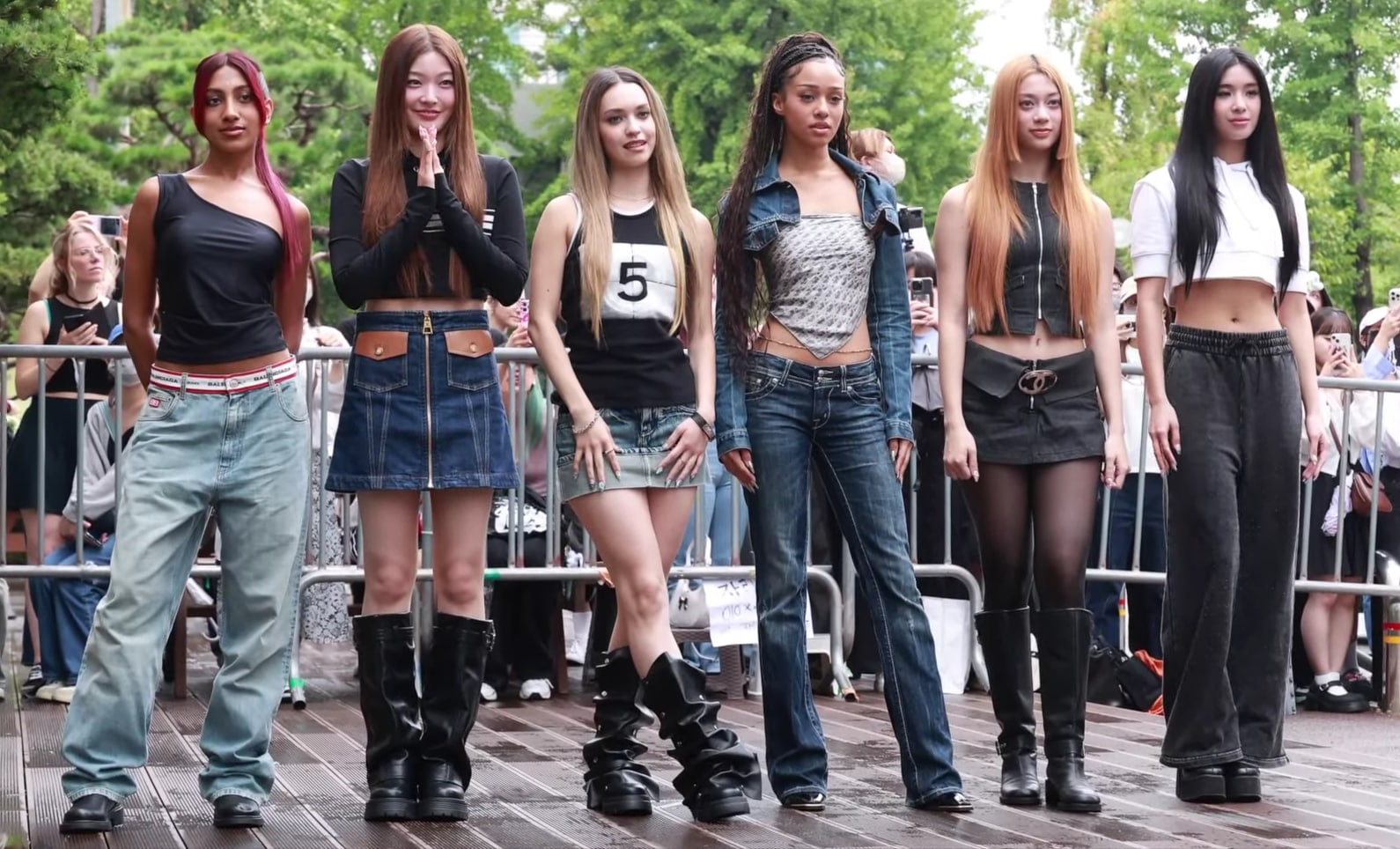
Katseye (left to right: Lara, Yoonchae, Daniela, Manon, Megan, Sophia)

For fall 2025, Gap chose Katseye for an ad campaign centered around younger people and their trends. Months beforehand, dancer and choreographer Robbie Blue had been brought on to Gap months in advance for a "dance-heavy" concept, specifically "to hire dancers from all different backgrounds and bring them together for one big masterpiece." Directed by Bethany Vargas and shot by Bjorn Looss, the Better in Denim ad campaign showed Katseye members dancing to Blue's choreography while wearing various pieces from Gap's denim collection, including mini skirts and zip-up vests. In particular, Gap wanted to highlight low-rise jeans in order to target recent Gen Z interest in the style.

Regarding the campaign, Mark Breitbard, Gap's Brand CEO, stated: "We love getting talent that feels like it's emerging. It's a cultural point of view and energy that's a fit for this campaign, and we're excited for that." Afterward, Gap's brand experience team, in collaboration with artist and set designer Wesley Goodrich, built "an exact replica of the white box set" inside their company headquarters on the Embarcadero in San Francisco. Gap and Katseye also released a hoodie which featured the girl group's name on the Gap logo.

== Impact ==
According to Gap CEO Richard Dickson at the company's third-quarter earnings call, Better in Denim led to "double-digit growth in denim," as well as significant traffic by way of "more than 8 billion impressions and 500 million views." In particular, it amassed more views in its first three days of release than all four previous ad campaigns combined. Dickson called it "one of the brand's most successful campaigns to date" and identified it as particularly resonating with Gen Z consumers.

== Critical reception ==
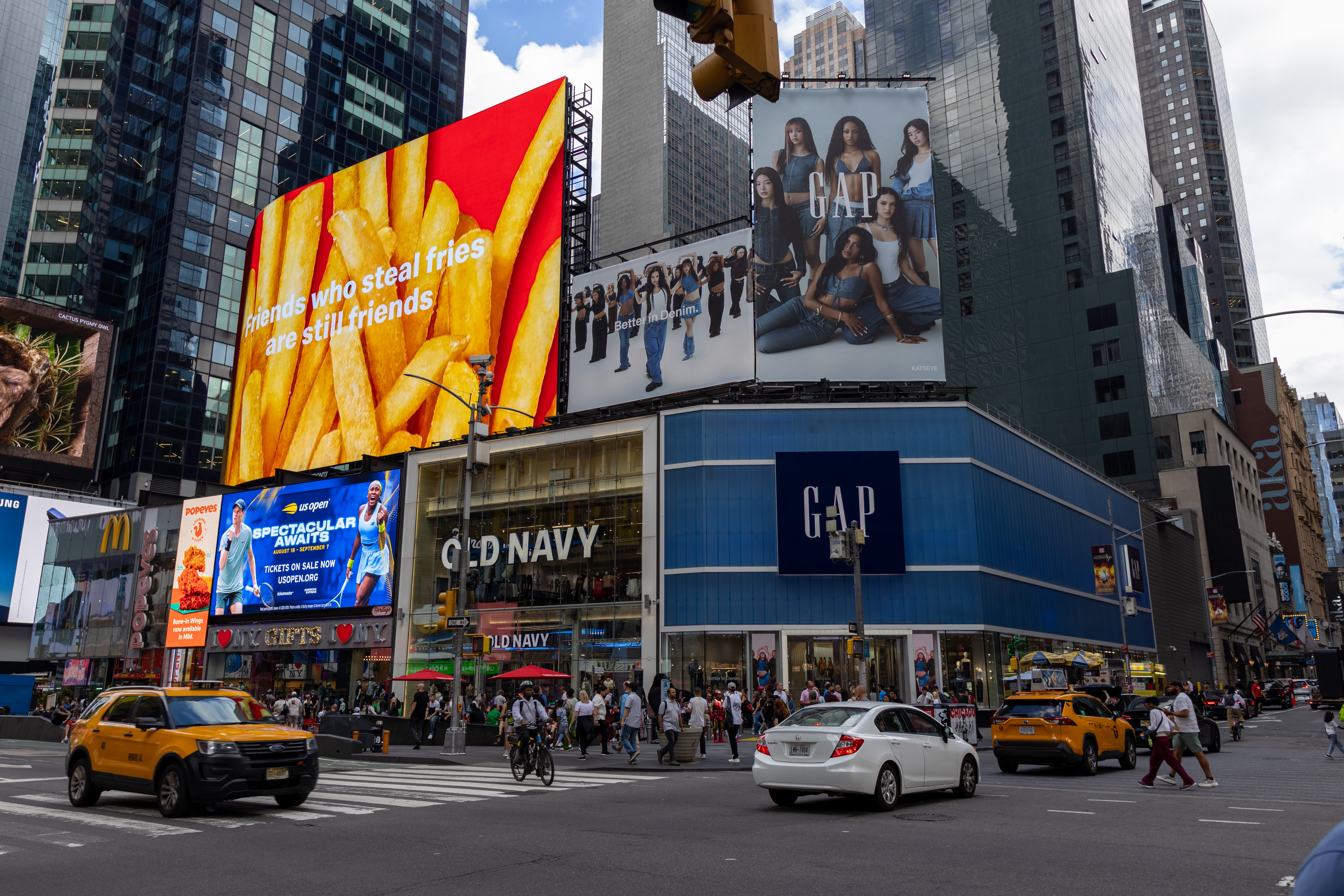
The campaign displayed in Times Square, New York City

Better in Denim was seen as a cultural touchpoint for Gen Z, as well as a prime example of how companies could connect with consumers in the modern age. CNN said that "The diversity, dancing and fashion has helped the ad go viral at a time when there's been debate about how companies are relating to their customer base." Harper's Bazaar wrote that the ad campaign "champions individuality and the ways in which we express ourselves through clothing. And what better representatives than a diverse, global girl band?" The San Francisco Standard called it a "meticulously souped-up way-back machine" that combines Katseye's "rabid Gen Z fanbase," an old radio hit that "has found a second life as a TikTok soundtrack," and a Y2K aesthetic.

Additionally, the ad campaign was released weeks after American Eagle's "Sydney Sweeney Has Great Jeans" campaign sparked controversy. There were many comparisons of the two advertisements, as well as questions of whether Gap's ad, which was interpreted as highlighting diversity, was made in response. In particular, the Kelis lyric "better than yours" was taken by some as a tongue-in-cheek "subtle dig." International Business Times stated that "Gap leapt into the cultural spotlight with unity and style, while American Eagle grapples with controversy and uncertain footfall and sales impact." Both Gap and Invisible Dynamics, the marketing agency responsible for Better in Denim, stated that the ad campaign was not a response, as it was shot in early July, before the American Eagle commercial.

== Accolades ==
Name of the award ceremony, year presented, category, nominee(s) of the award, and the result of the nomination
Award ceremony	Year	Category	Result	Ref.
Webby Awards	2026	Fashion, Beauty & Lifestyle, Branded Entertainment	Won	
