= Katseye =

Los Angeles–based girl group

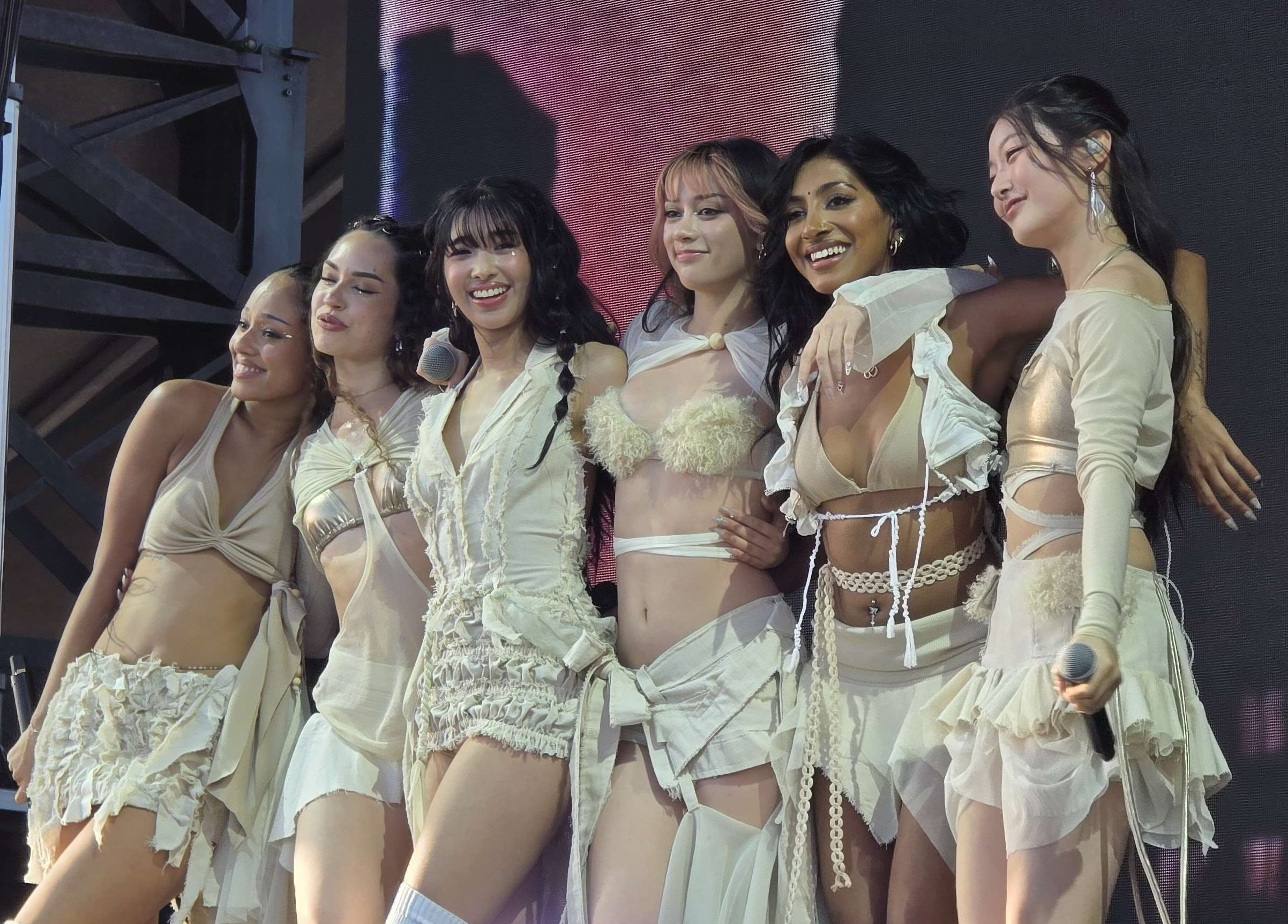
- Katseye in May 2025; Left to right: Manon Bannerman, Daniela Avanzini, Sophia Laforteza, Megan Skiendiel, Lara Raj, and Yoonchae Jeung

Background information
- Origin: Los Angeles, California, U.S.
- Genre: Pop
- Years active: 2024–present
- Labels: Hybe UMG; Geffen
- Members: Daniela Avanzini; Lara Raj; Manon Bannerman; Megan Skiendiel; Sophia Laforteza; Yoonchae Jeung
- Website: katseye.world

Katseye (stylized in all caps) is a girl group formed in 2024, based in Los Angeles. The group consists of six members: Daniela Avanzini, Lara Raj, Manon Bannerman, Megan Skiendiel, Sophia Laforteza, and Yoonchae Jeung. With members from the Philippines, South Korea, Switzerland, and the United States, Katseye is often called a "global girl group".

The group was formed through the 2023 reality competition series Dream Academy, a collaboration between Hybe and Geffen Records. Its formation is chronicled in the Netflix docuseries Pop Star Academy: Katseye, which recounts the audition process, intensive training, and formation of the group. Katseye debuted in June 2024 with the single "Debut", followed by their breakthrough single, "Touch". They released their first extended play (EP), SIS (Soft Is Strong), later that year. In April 2025, they released "Gnarly", the lead single for their second EP, Beautiful Chaos (2025). Despite receiving mixed reactions on release, the single garnered significant attention and marked the group's first entry on the Billboard Hot 100, while Beautiful Chaos debuted at number four on the Billboard 200. The EP's second single, "Gabriela", peaked within the top 40 of the Hot 100 and was nominated for the Grammy Award for Best Pop Duo/Group Performance, with the group also nominated for Best New Artist at the 68th Annual Grammy Awards. Their third EP, Wild (2026), became their first number one release on the Billboard 200.

Katseye is recognized for their distinctive fashion identity, prominently drawing influence from Y2K fashion. Their growing brand image has led to multiple endorsements and campaigns tying into the style, including a campaign with Fendi's Baguette bag and Gap's low-rise denim. Katseye has also worked with British cosmetics retailer Lush, American fashion house Coach, and Filipino fast food chain Jollibee. Humberto Leon is the group's creative director, taking inspiration from broad influences and the group's diverse backgrounds.

== Name ==
Logo used since debut

In an interview with InStyle, group member Sophia explained that the name Katseye derives from the gemstone chrysoberyl, specifically the cymophane variety, commonly known as "cat's eye"; the gemstone's distinctive optical effect, where light appears to shift and reflect differently when viewed from various angles, corresponds to the composition of the group's members' diverse personalities, talents, and backgrounds. The group was initially planned to be named "Catseye", but during an interview with LA radio station KIIS-FM, it was revealed that Lara suggested the spelling "Katseye", which the members felt gave the name a more distinctive and stylized appearance. Katseye's logo and branding were designed by Seoul-based graphic design studio Husky Fox, incorporating elements of the gemstone alongside the six members' unique backgrounds.

== History ==
=== 2007–2024: Pre-debut activities and formation through Dream Academy ===
Several members of Katseye had experience in professional dance, television, and the entertainment industry before debuting with the group. Sophia Laforteza, born to Filipino musical theater actress Carla Guevara Laforteza, began singing at age three, and in 2022 appeared on the game show Family Feud Philippines as a contestant. Atlanta-born Daniela Avanzini began competitive dancesport at age three, and appeared on America's Got Talent season 8 in 2013, and was a top 10 finalist on So You Think You Can Dance: The Next Generation in 2016. Megan Skiendiel was also trained in professional dance from a young age. Lara Raj began acting and singing at an early age, featuring in a campaign video for Michelle Obama's Global Girls Alliance, an initiative for the Obama Foundation in 2018. Manon Bannerman gained popularity through short-form video content on TikTok and Instagram, where she posted fashion and lifestyle clips beginning in 2021. She also pursued modeling work in Switzerland. Yoonchae Jeung, the group's youngest member and a native of South Korea, became a K-pop trainee in 2020 before joining the lineup of Dream Academy.

Formal preparations for the group began in November 2021, when Hybe and Geffen Records launched a worldwide audition process for a girl group with "contestants from around the world", as part of the joint venture Hybe x Geffen Records. With auditions in South Korea, the United States, Japan, and the United Kingdom in 2022, the partnership aimed to create a group that would "transcend national, cultural, and artistic boundaries". In an interview with the Korea JoongAng Daily, Hybe founder Bang Si-hyuk expressed his intention to promote the resultant group to the US market. From more than 120,000 applicants, 20 were selected to participate in the reality competition series The Debut: Dream Academy, which determined the final lineup through a series of performance-based missions. Before the series premiere, the contestants were trained for a year in Los Angeles using methods from the Korean idol trainee system. The competition concluded on November 18, 2023, with Sophia Laforteza, Lara Raj, Yoonchae Jeung, Megan Skiendiel, Daniela Avanzini, and Manon Bannerman chosen as the members of Katseye.

Katseye's formation and preparation for their debut EP were serialized in the documentary Pop Star Academy: Katseye, which premiered on August 21, 2024. Distributed by Netflix, the documentary was directed by Nadia Hallgren.

=== 2024–2025: SIS (Soft Is Strong) and Beautiful Chaos ===
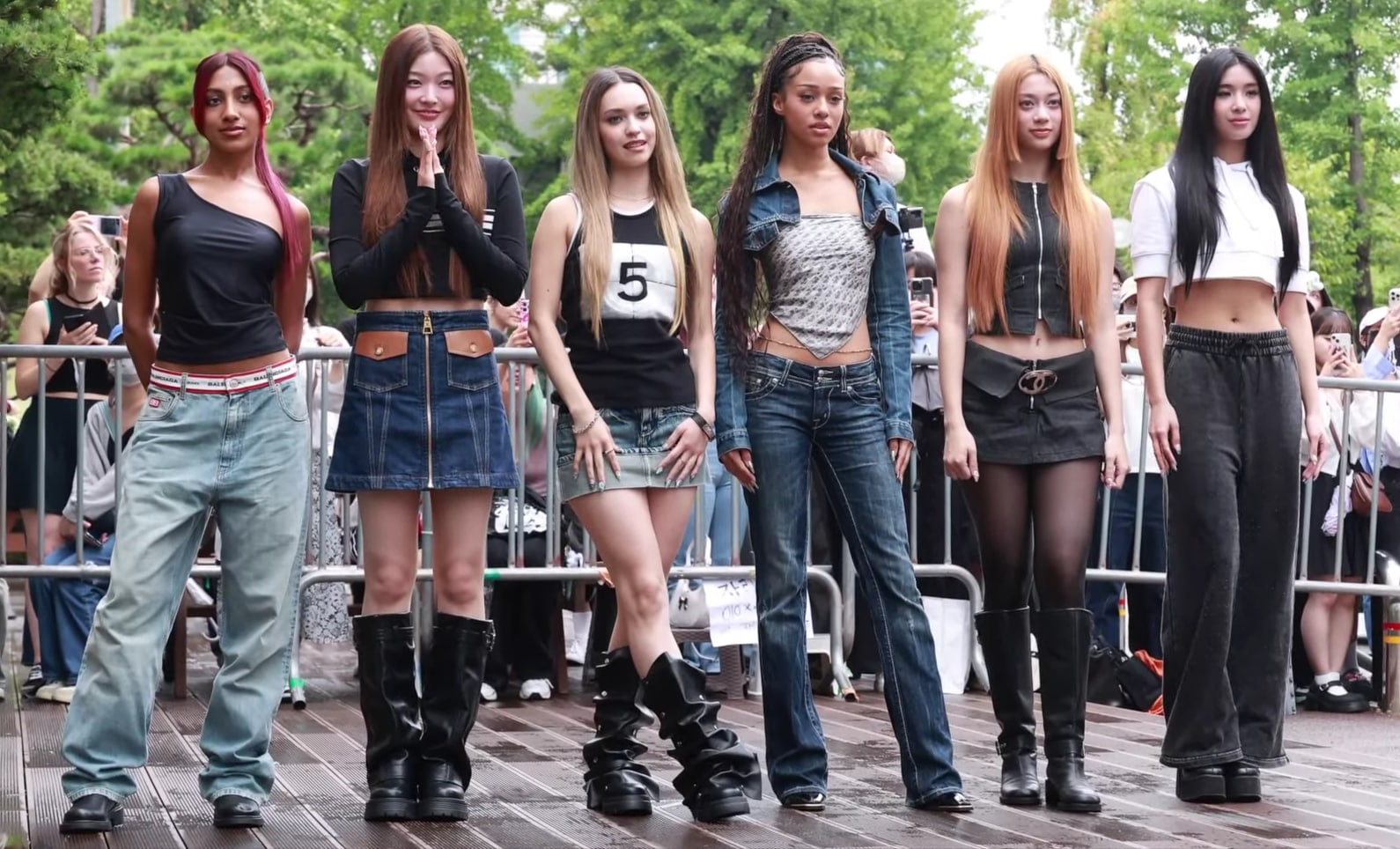
Katseye promoting in Seoul in September 2024

In June 2024, Hybe confirmed that the release of the group's first EP was set for August that year. For the EP, Katseye collaborated with several songwriters and producers, including Ryan Tedder and Omer Fedi. Two singles preceded its release. The first, "Debut", was released on June 28, with a video filmed in Medellín, Colombia, directed by Gregory Ohrel. The single is an upbeat pop track that explores themes of confidence and sisterhood in reference to the members' bond as a group. The second single, "Touch", was released on July 26. The melodic drum and bass R&B track discusses the "complexity of love" and deviates from the sound of "Debut", emphasizing the members' vocals. The single ranked 22nd on the Billboard Bubbling Under Hot 100 chart and entered the Billboard Philippines Hot 100 chart. "Touch" attained further success after its choreography went viral as a dance challenge on TikTok in September 2024.

The full EP, SIS (Soft Is Strong), was released on August 16. With five tracks, the EP debuted at number 119 on the Billboard 200 as Katseye landed atop the Emerging Artists chart. In support of the EP, the group embarked on an Asian tour, which began in South Korea on September 12. Megan stopped touring on September 21, owing to a back injury. On November 14, Katseye released "Flame", the theme song for the Netflix animated series Jentry Chau vs. the Underworld.

On March 7, 2025, before any new music was announced, Katseye was added to the lineup of Wango Tango, scheduled for May 10. They were then added to the lineup of Lollapalooza in Chicago, scheduled for August 3. Katseye released a new single, "Gnarly", on April 30, which became their first entry on the Billboard Hot 100. The song was released as the first single from their second EP, Beautiful Chaos. On June 6, Katseye released a remix of "Gnarly" featuring rapper Ice Spice. On June 20, they released "Gabriela", the EP's second single. The track was accompanied by a music video styled as a telenovela and featured a cameo from actress Jessica Alba. Co-written by Charli XCX, "Gabriela" was described as a contemporary twist on Dolly Parton's "Jolene".

On June 27, Beautiful Chaos was released, alongside a music video for the EP's third single, "Gameboy". The EP debuted at number four on the Billboard 200, their first entry in the top ten of the chart. On November 7, Katseye earned nominations for Best New Artist and Best Pop/Duo Group Performance (for "Gabriela") at the 68th Annual Grammy Awards. That same month, they embarked on the Beautiful Chaos Tour, their first concert tour. On the tour, they debuted a new song titled "Internet Girl", which was officially released on January 2, 2026. The single received polarized reactions, with some critics praising its "campy" and satirical approach to internet culture, while others criticized its heavy use of stylized production and lyrics. Commentary surrounding the track highlighted concerns that the group's songs prioritize shock value and viral marketing over artistic showcase or cohesion, with some questioning whether their music reflects artistic intent or label-driven decisions.

=== 2026: Manon's and Sophia's hiatuses and Wild ===
On February 20, 2026, it was announced that Manon would take a hiatus from the group to focus on "personal health and wellbeing". The statement resulted in significant media coverage and public response, with outlets framing the hiatus within broader discussions about work–life balance and health in high-intensity performance careers. Some online commentators noted that Bannerman, the group's only Black member, engaged with content highlighting mistreatment of Black women in the industry. In interviews, Katseye's members expressed their support for Bannerman during her hiatus.

On March 13, Katseye began a string of South American festival appearances with a performance at Lollapalooza Argentina, with approximately 100,000 in audience. The group performed at Lollapalooza Chile the next day, and Festival Estéreo Picnic in Colombia and Lollapalooza Brazil later in the month. To coincide with a performance at Coachella, Katseye released the single "Pinky Up" on April 9. Before their performance, the festival showcased a video of the active members announcing their new EP, Wild, which released on August 14. On May 13, the group announced their second tour, the Wildworld Tour, in support of the EP, which began on September 1 at the 3Arena in Dublin, Ireland. On May 25, Katseye won all three awards they were nominated for at the American Music Awards of 2026, and performed "Pinky Up" at the ceremony. On June 12, Katseye released "Iconic by Mistake" in collaboration with Hybe label mates Le Sserafim and Illit, the groups' first collaboration.

On August 7, it was announced that Sophia was also going on a hiatus for "personal health and wellness". She wrote, "making this decision wasn't easy, but I'm learning that health has to come first." She is set to resume group activities in January 2027, missing the entirety of the Wildworld Tour. Katseye was initially announced as part of the lineup for Olivia Rodrigo's Daisy Chain Fields music festival on August 29, though canceled their set two days before the festival after Megan sprained her ankle. They later made a surprise appearance before Devon Again's set.

On August 12, Hybe and Geffen, with the collaboration of Interscope Records and Boardwalk Pictures, released a documentary film, Katseye: Wild Hearts. The film was made available for streaming on Hulu in the United States and Disney+ internationally on October 16. The next month they made their Saturday Night Live debut as musical guests, with Jalen Brunson hosting the season premiere. On October 13, they released "Unloveu" as a single; it was originally exclusive to the Target edition of Wild. On October 18, they performed "Pinky Up" and "Animal" at the Victoria's Secret Fashion Show 2026.

Katseye performing at Climate Pledge Arena 2026

In November 2026, Katseye postponed its Wildworld Tour concerts in Detroit, Chicago, and Minneapolis, as Megan was recovering from a concussion. The tour recommenced on November 10 in Austin. At the concert, Megan performed while seated and wearing large sunglasses. Fans reacted with speculation, concern, and criticism for the group's management.

== Endorsements ==
In September 2024, Katseye made their first New York Fashion Week attendance at the Spring Summer 2025 show for the American fashion company Coach, which in turn placed them in several promotional endorsements and content for the brand's released collection. Subsequently, Katseye were featured in Coach's collaboration campaign with the South Korean streetwear brand Matin Kim, which launched a line of ready-to-wear clothing for Japan, South Korea, and Hong Kong.

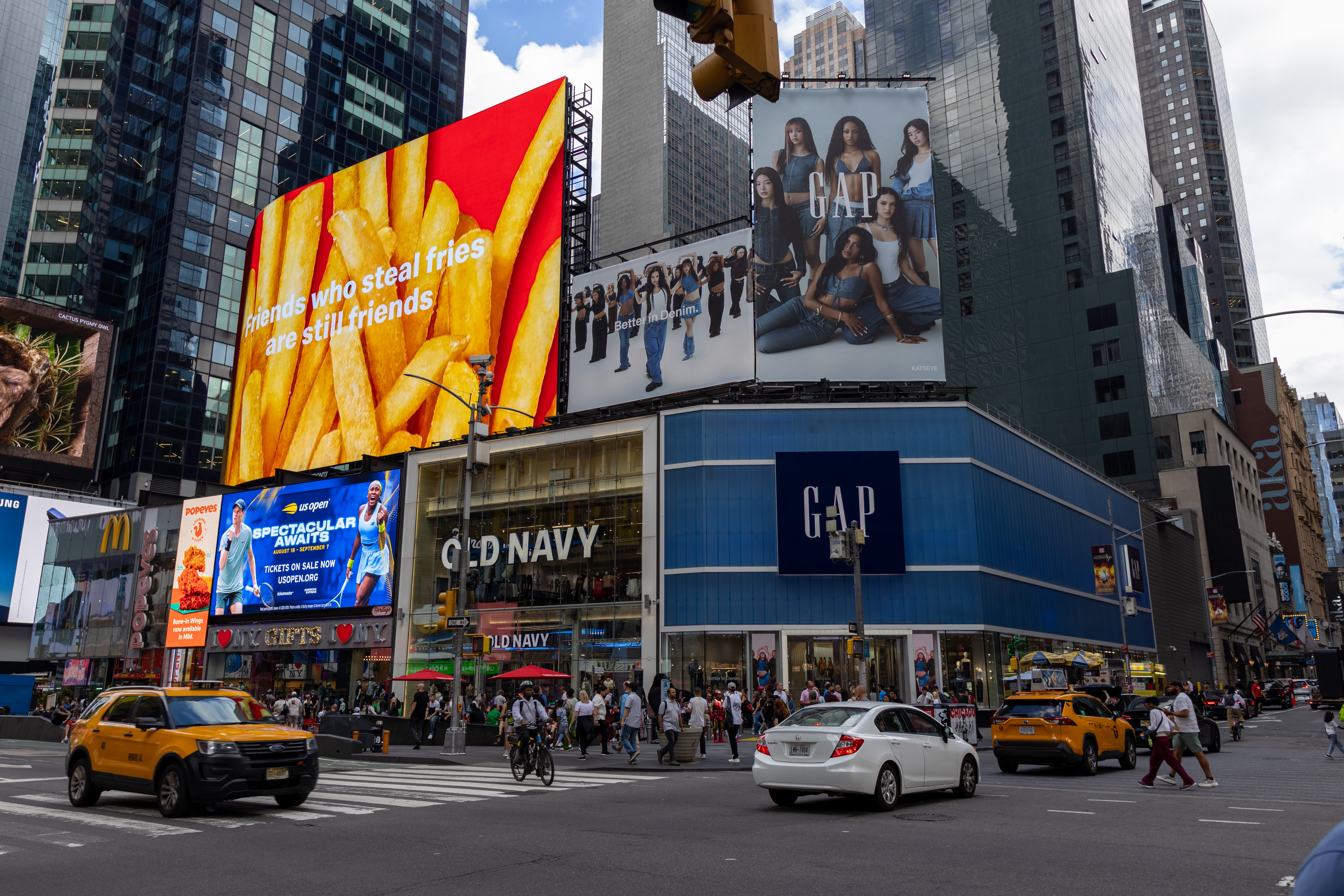
Gap's "Better in Denim" campaign featuring Katseye displayed in Times Square, New York City

In April 2025, Katseye was featured in Fendi's Fendi For Yourself campaign, launched in celebration of the brand's 100th anniversary. In May, Katseye partnered with Glossier to launch the brand's first lip oil product line titled 'Lip Glaze', with new products themed after the group's members. In the same month, the group launched a collaboration with Urban Outfitters, where they performed live at the "UO Haul" event in New York on May 20 to showcase their single "Gnarly". Additionally, the group released an edition of their EP Beautiful Chaos for pre-order through Urban Outfitters. In June 2025, Katseye partnered with jewelry brand Pandora to release various charms selected by the members. In the same month, Katseye partnered with Lush to release a bath bomb and six soaps. In August, they launched a merchandise collaboration with Philippine fast food chain Jollibee, which also released menu items themed after the group in its stores in the United States and Canada.

In August 2025, Katseye starred in Gap's Fall 2025 "Better in Denim" campaign, dancing to a re-recorded version of Kelis' "Milkshake". Gap CEO Richard Dickson described the campaign as "a huge success" for the brand. In November 2025, Katseye recorded public service announcements for MTA New York City Transit's subway system. In January 2026, Katseye partnered with Laneige to promote their JuicePop Box lip tints. In February 2026, Katseye appeared on State Farm's Super Bowl commercial for Super Bowl LX. In the same month, the group also partnered with Erewhon to release the "Gabriela Smoothie", with proceeds supporting the Malala Fund by Malala Yousafzai. At the same time, they were named Global Ambassadors for L'Oréal's Matrix Essentials, promoting their new "Matrix Moves" campaign.

In October 2026, Katseye teamed up with the Walt Disney Company and Complex to release Mickey and Minnie Mouse-inspired merchandise ahead of the Katseye: Wild Hearts release on Disney+ and Hulu on October 16.

== Public image ==
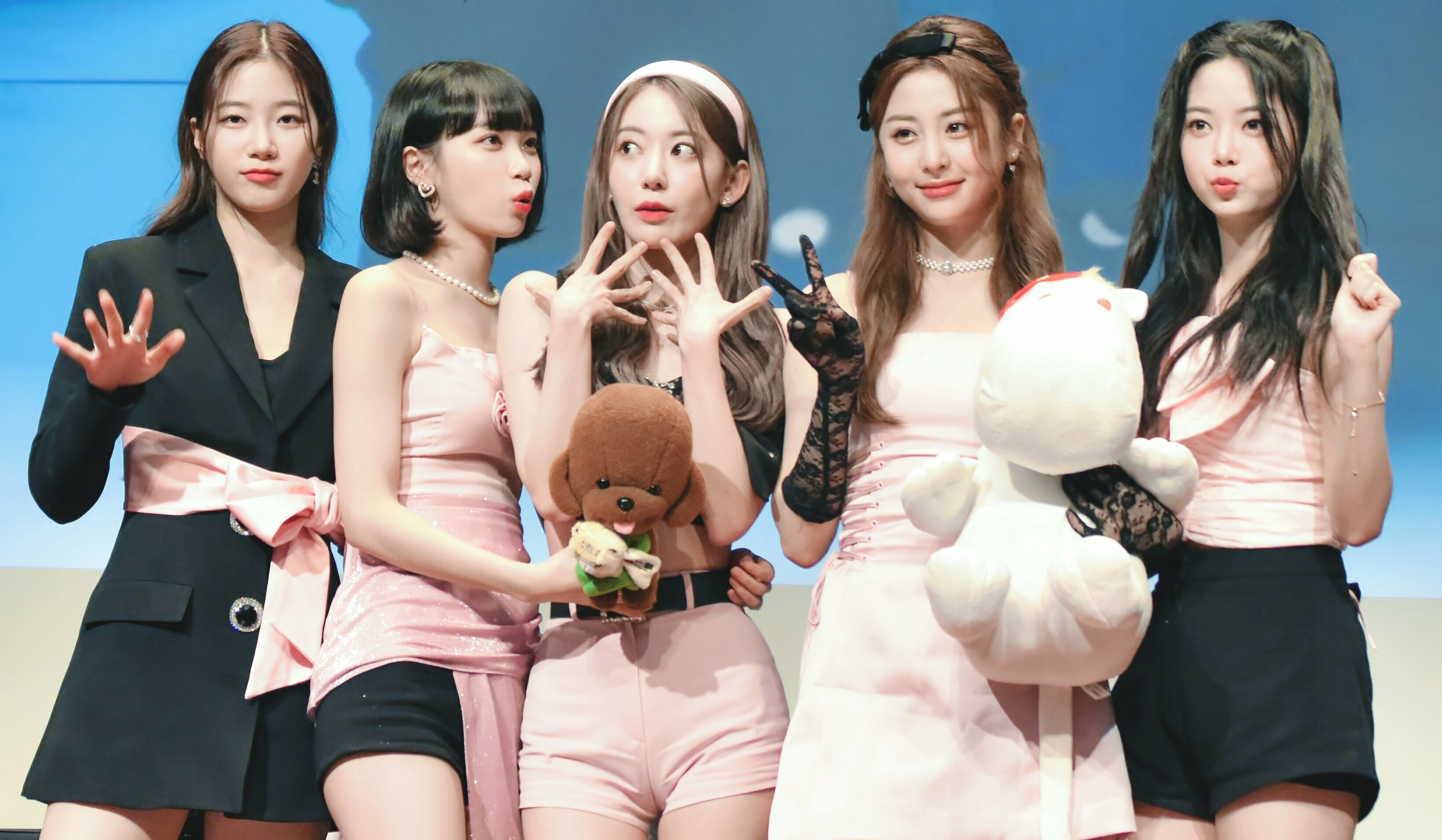
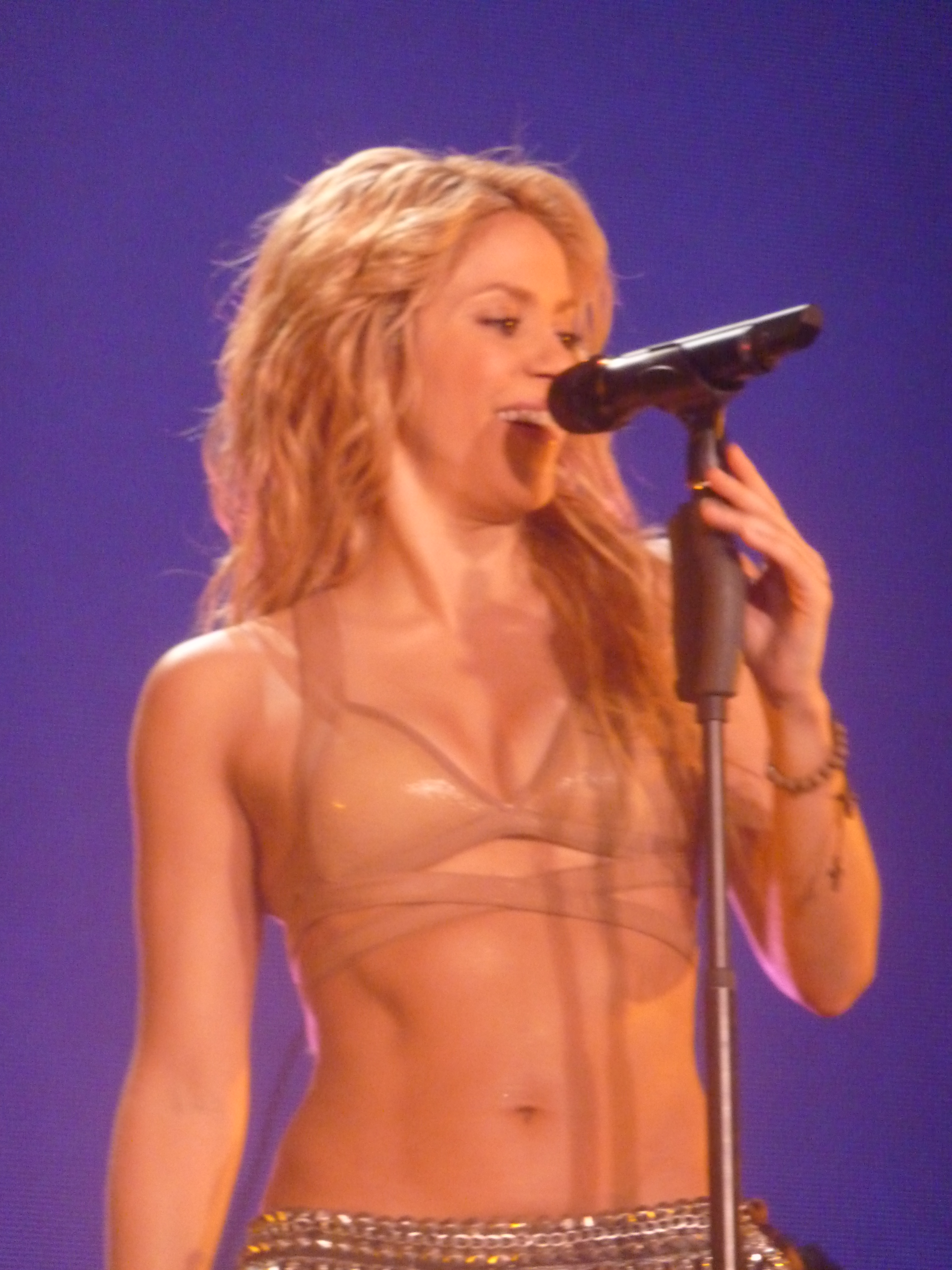
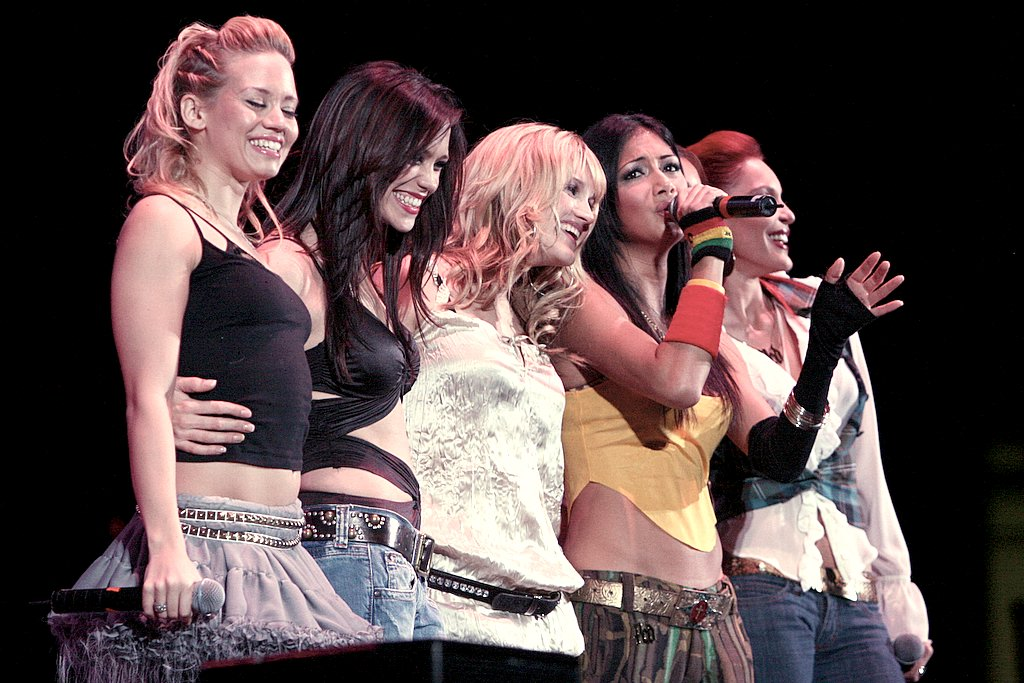
Katseye's stylistic influences include (clockwise) Le Sserafim, Shakira, and the Pussycat Dolls.

Katseye is widely labeled as a "global girl group", blending stylistic traits of Western pop with the presentation attributed to K-pop. As Daniela described them in an interview with i-D, they are "the first American girl group to make American pop music but trained to do the crazy choreography of K‑pop." The group includes the first Indian, Filipina, Latina, and Black artists to be signed under Hybe: Lara, Sophia, Daniela, and Manon, respectively. Before the group's debut, Teen Vogue named Katseye one of 12 "Girl Groups to Watch in 2024". Musically, Katseye has cited the Pussycat Dolls, Spice Girls, and Le Sserafim as influences.

Katseye is noted for their distinctive fashion styling, often cited as a defining feature of the group alongside their music. With low-rise jeans, crop tops, and archival pieces, the group draws sartorial influence from late 1990s and early 2000s pop culture, often referred to as Y2K fashion. Katseye's long-term creative director, Humberto Leon, states drawing inspiration from art, film, and history rather than solely musical influences for the group. In particular, the style of celebrities prominent in the early 2000s, such as Devon Aoki for Megan, and Shakira for Daniela, served as key references for the image and appearance of the group's members. "Without tokenizing them", Leon cites the appreciation for the group's diverse backgrounds as a forerunner for their image, often incorporating items such as the bindi for Lara and waist beads for Manon. Members have highlighted the group's identity and openness to these influences, with Manon stating, "I have locs sometimes. Humberto is always like, 'Yeah, let's do it.' He's always asking if I have new ideas".

In December 2025, Katseye placed second in Google's U.S. "Trending Musicians" ranking, according to their annual Year in Search review. Additionally, TikTok named Katseye the "Global Artist of the Year", citing over 30 billion views for the group on the platform.

== Members ==
- Daniela Avanzini
- Lara Raj
- Manon Bannerman
- Megan Skiendiel
- Sophia Laforteza – leader
- Yoonchae Jeung

=== Timeline ===
From September to October 2024, Megan Skiendiel suspended activities to recover from a back injury.

Manon Bannerman and Sophia Laforteza are both on temporary hiatuses to recover from health issues as of February 2026 and August 2026, respectively. Sophia is scheduled to return in January 2027.

== Discography ==
=== Extended plays ===
List of extended plays
Title	Details	Peak chart positions										Sales	Certifications
Title	Details	US	BEL (FL)	BEL (WA)	CRO	FRA	KOR	NZ	SCO	SWI	UK	Sales	Certifications
SIS (Soft Is Strong)	Released: August 16, 2024; Label: Hybe UMG, Geffen; Formats: CD, LP, digital download, streaming	98	16	71	2	78	8	—	58	69	— (Note: SIS (Soft Is Strong) did not enter the UK Albums Chart, but peaked at number 45 on the UK Albums Sales Chart.)	KOR: 173,869; US: 8,000	RMNZ: Gold
Beautiful Chaos	Released: June 27, 2025; Label: Hybe UMG, Geffen; Formats: CD, LP, digital download, streaming	4	5	18	7	15	2	14	85	31	55	KOR: 192,845; US: 186,000	BPI: Gold; RMNZ: Gold; SNEP: Gold
Wild	Released: August 14, 2026; Label: Hybe UMG, Geffen; Formats: CD, LP, digital download, streaming	1	1	1	2	2	3	4	2	2	2	KOR: 158,620; US: 145,000	
"—" denotes releases that did not chart or were not released in that region.

=== Compilation albums ===
List of compilation albums
Title	Details
Katseye: The Dance Breaks	Scheduled: November 27, 2026; Label: Hybe UMG, Geffen; Formats: LP; Track listing: 1. "Debut" (Dance break version); 2. "Gnarly" (Dance break version); 3. "Gabriela" (Dance break version)

=== Singles ===
List of singles
Title	Year	Peak chart positions										Certifications	Album
Title	Year	US	AUS	CAN	FRA	KOR	NZ	PHL	SGP	UK	WW	Certifications	Album
"Debut"	2024	—	—	—	—	— (Note: "Debut" did not enter the Circle Digital Chart, but peaked at number 194 on the Circle Download Chart.)	—	—	—	—	—	BPI: Silver; MC: Gold; RMNZ: Gold	SIS (Soft Is Strong)
"Touch"	2024	— (Note: "Touch" did not enter the Billboard Hot 100, but peaked at number two on the Bubbling Under Hot 100 chart.)	—	79	—	70	— (Note: "Touch" did not enter the NZ Top 40 Singles Chart, but peaked at number 16 on the NZ Hot Singles Chart.)	13	5	82	58	ARIA: Platinum; BPI: Silver; MC: Platinum; RMNZ: Platinum; SNEP: Gold	SIS (Soft Is Strong)
"Gnarly"	2025	82	76	69	—	104	— (Note: "Gnarly" did not enter the NZ Top 40 Singles Chart, but peaked at number 2 on the NZ Hot Singles Chart.)	23	7	52	41	ARIA: Platinum; BPI: Gold; MC: Platinum; RMNZ: Platinum; SNEP: Gold	Beautiful Chaos
"Gabriela"	2025	21	27	20	16	— (Note: "Gabriela" did not enter the Circle Digital Chart, but peaked at number 126 on the Circle Download Chart.)	26	6	5	38	16	ARIA: Platinum; BPI: Gold; MC: Platinum; RMNZ: Platinum; SNEP: Diamond	Beautiful Chaos
"Gameboy"	2025	— (Note: "Gameboy" did not enter the Billboard Hot 100, but peaked at number nine on the Bubbling Under Hot 100 chart.)	—	90	—	— (Note: "Gameboy" did not enter the Circle Digital Chart, but peaked at number 180 on the Circle Download Chart.)	— (Note: "Gameboy" did not enter the NZ Top 40 Singles Chart, but peaked at number 12 on the NZ Hot Singles Chart.)	42	27	—	131	BPI: Silver; RMNZ: Gold	Beautiful Chaos
"Internet Girl"	2026	29	45	32	—	— (Note: "Internet Girl" did not enter the Circle Digital Chart, but peaked at number 167 on the Circle Download Chart.)	34	37	19	24	32		Non-album single
"Pinky Up"	2026	28	19	31	108	— (Note: "Pinky Up" did not enter the Circle Digital Chart, but peaked at number 139 on the Circle Download Chart.)	20	26	8	14	22	BPI: Silver; MC: Platinum	Wild
"Iconic by Mistake" (with Le Sserafim and Illit)	2026	38	39	46	159	123	29	43	3	22	23		Non-album single
"Animal"	2026	24	1	24	107	— (Note: "Animal" did not enter the Circle Digital Chart, but peaked at number 63 on the Circle Download Chart.)	10	9	2	12	10	ARIA: Gold; BPI: Silver; MC: Gold	Wild
"Hootie Frutti"	2026	31	—	32	146	— (Note: "Hootie Frutti" did not enter the Circle Digital Chart, but peaked at number 116 on the Circle Download Chart.)	30	45	6	16	19		Wild
"Unloveu"	2026	—	—	—	—	—	— (Note: "Unloveu" did not enter the NZ Top 40 Singles Chart, but peaked at number 33 on the NZ Hot Singles Chart.)	—	—	—	—		Wild
"—" denotes releases that did not chart or were not released in that region.

=== Other charted and certified songs ===
List of other charted songs
Title	Year	Peak chart positions								Certifications	Album
Title	Year	US Bub.	US Dance/ Pop	CAN	IRE	KOR DL	NZ Hot	SPA	UK	Certifications	Album
"My Way"	2024	—	—	—	—	—	—	—	—	PMB: Gold	SIS (Soft Is Strong)
"Touch" (remix) (featuring Yeonjun)	2024	—	—	—	—	128	—	—	—		Non-album songs
"Gnarly" (remix) (featuring Ice Spice)	2025	—	—	—	—	—	39	—	—		Non-album songs
"Mean Girls"	2025	—	—	—	—	—	20	—	—	PMB: Gold	Beautiful Chaos
"M.I.A."	2025	—	11	—	—	—	24	—	—	PMB: Platinum	Beautiful Chaos
"Gabriela" (remix) (featuring Young Miko)	2025	—	—	—	—	—	—	14	—		Non-album song
"Bel Air"	2026	11	—	—	77	—	7	—	97		Wild
"That Way"	2026	14	—	92	—	—	3	—	—		Wild
"—" denotes releases that did not chart or were not released in that region.

=== Soundtrack appearances ===
List of promotional singles
Title	Year	Album	Ref.
"Flame"	2024	Jentry Chau vs. the Underworld OST	
"Time Lapse" (Katseye version)	2025	Good Boy OST	
"Fright Song" (Monster High featuring Katseye)	2025	Non-album singles	
"M.I.A." (Valorant Game Changers version) (with Valorant)	2025	Non-album singles	

== Videography ==
=== Music videos ===
Title	Year	Director(s)	Ref.
"Debut"	2024	Gregory Ohrel	
"Touch"	2024	Cody Critcheloe	
"Gnarly"	2025	Cody Critcheloe	
"Gabriela"	2025	Andrew Thomas Huang	
"Gameboy"	2025	Aerin Moreno	
"Pinky Up"	2026	Bardia Zeinali	
"Iconic by Mistake" (with Illit and Le Sserafim)	2026	Cody Critcheloe	
"Animal"	2026	Cody Critcheloe	
"Hootie Frutti"	2026	Alfred Marroquin	

=== Other videos ===
Title	Year	Director(s)	Ref.
"My Way" Lyric Film	2024	Lumpens	
"I'm Pretty" Lyric Film	2024	Rahul Bhatt	
"Tonight I Might" Lyric Film	2024	Rahul Bhatt	
"Mean Girls" Visualizer (Dream Academy Version)	2025	Not credited	
"M.I.A" Visualizer	2025	Not credited	
"Mean Girls" Visualizer	2025	Not credited	
"Internet Girl" Visualizer	2026	Not credited	
"Unloveu" Visualizer	2026	Jeff Rattanong	

== Filmography ==
=== Television ===
Year	Title	Notes	Ref.
2023	Dream Academy	Survival show determining Katseye's members	
2024	Pop Star Academy: Katseye	Documentary on the group's debut preparation	
2025	Star Academy	Featured guests for season 13, episode 3	
2026	World Scout: The Final Piece	Featured guests for episode 12	
2026	Saturday Night Live	Musical guest, episode: "Jalen Brunson / Katseye"	

=== Film ===
Year	Title	Notes	Ref.
2026	Katseye: Wild Hearts	Documentary film	

=== Video game ===
Year	Title	Notes	Ref.
2025	Toca Boca World	Collaboration as guest characters	

== Tours and concerts ==
=== Headlining tours ===
- Beautiful Chaos Tour (2025)
- The Wildworld Tour (2026-2027)
