= Megan Skiendiel =

American singer (born 2006)

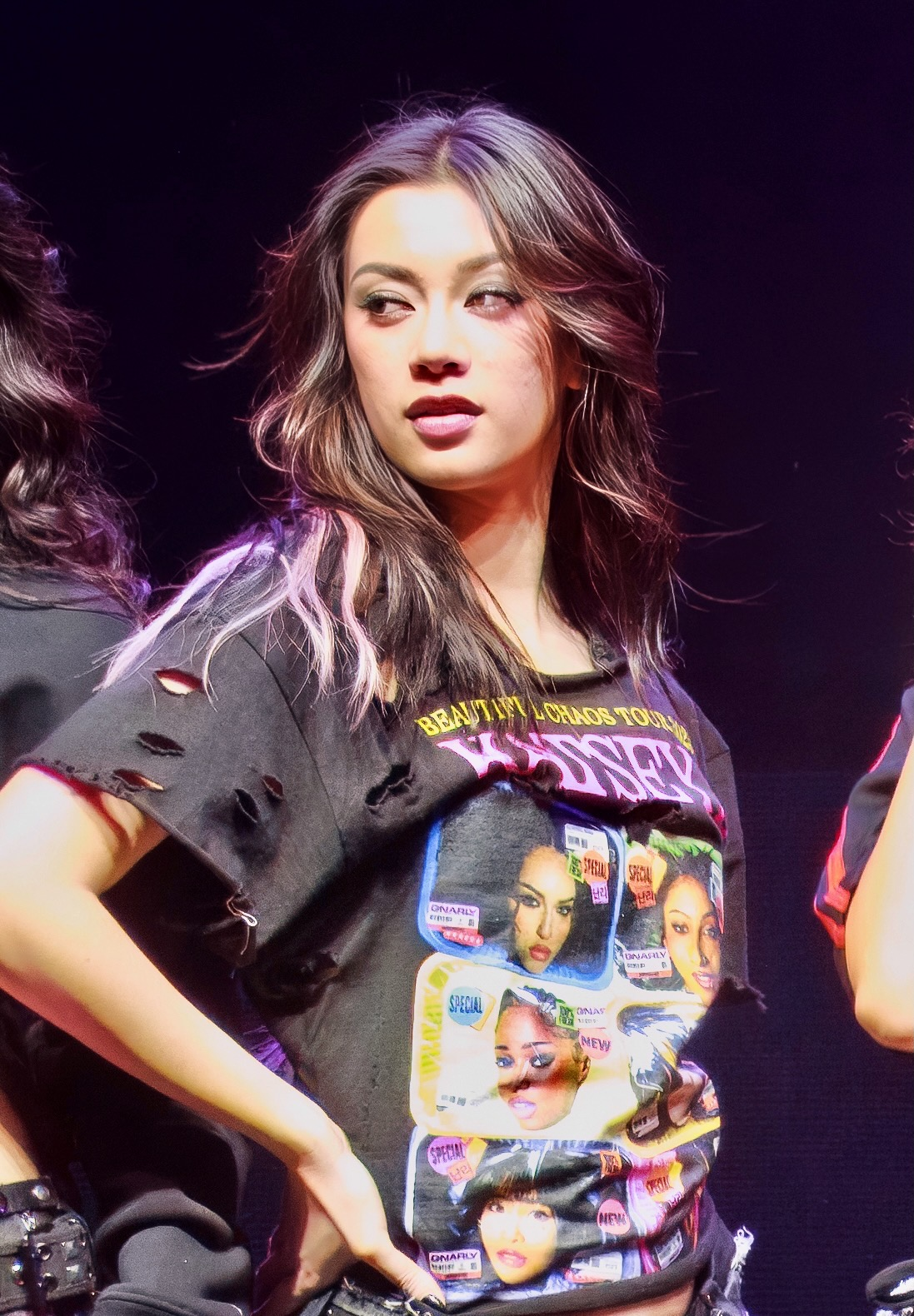
- Skiendiel in 2025
- Born: Megan Meiyok Skiendiel; February 10, 2006 (age 20); Honolulu, Hawaii, U.S.
- Occupation: Singer
- Years active: 2015–present
- Musical career
- Genre: Pop
- Instrument: Vocals
- Years active: 2024–present
- Labels: Hybe UMG; Geffen
- Member of: Katseye

Signature
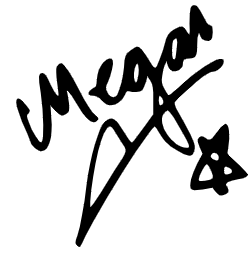

Megan Meiyok Skiendiel (/skɛndɛl/ SKEN-del; born February 10, 2006), also known mononymously as Megan, is an American singer. She is best known as a member of Katseye, a girl group formed through the 2023 competition reality show Dream Academy created by Hybe and Geffen Records.

== Early and personal life ==
Megan Meiyok Skiendiel was born on February 10, 2006, in Honolulu, Hawaii, to Chinese Singaporean mother Sylvia Lee and Swedish-American father William Skiendiel. Her middle name, Meiyok (美玉), means "beautiful jade" in Chinese. She has an older brother.

Skiendiel began formal training in dance at the age of four and took up vocal lessons by the age of six. She has publicly discussed living with dyslexia and psoriasis. She transitioned to online schooling from the fourth grade. Aside from fluency in her native English, she has conversational proficiency in Cantonese and French.

In a June 2025 live broadcast on Weverse with bandmate Lara, Skiendiel publicly came out as bisexual, coinciding with Pride Month.

== Career ==
=== 2015–2022: Early acting and modeling career ===
In 2015, Skiendiel and her family were cast as extras in Jurassic World. Skiendiel's acting credits include minor roles in Bosch: Legacy (2022), Sydney to the Max (2021), and Ripple Effect (2021). In 2019, Skiendiel was featured in the U.S. Bank campaign titled "Say It, Do It". Skiendiel also did print and runway modelling work in the late 2010s, including walking for brands at Paris, Los Angeles, and New York fashion weeks. While training under another company in 2021, Skiendel was scouted to audition for a collaboration project between Hybe and Geffen Records.

=== 2023–present: Dream Academy and debut with Katseye ===
Skiendiel in 2024

In August 2023, Skiendiel was announced as one of twenty contestants in The Debut: Dream Academy, a global audition program created with the goal of forming a new international girl group. In the final ranking, she placed fifth overall, securing a spot in the final lineup of what would become Katseye. The group's debut single, "Debut", was released on June 28, 2024, and was subsequently included in their first EP, SIS (Soft Is Strong). In September 2024, Skiendiel paused her participation in Katseye's Asia promotional tour due to a back injury related to scoliosis. She returned to performances by December 2024, appearing at iHeartRadio KISS108's Jingle Ball in Boston. In December 2025, she was included in GLAAD's 20 Under 20 list. Presented by Teen Vogue, the list honors influential LGBTQ youth aged 20 and below.

On March 15, 2026, Skiendiel participated in the Valorant Masters Santiago 2026 "New Agent Showmatch" of the 2026 Valorant Champions Tour, where she played for the "Weones Malos" team, which won the international game. In April, Skiendiel appeared in the music video for Laufey's song "Madwoman", alongside Alysa Liu, Lola Tung, and Hudson Williams. Earlier that year, entertainment outlets covered a viral red-carpet incident at the 83rd Golden Globes in which photographers repeatedly called Laufey "Megan", prompting her to correct them.

Skiendiel performing onstage post-concussion

Early in November 2026, Skiendiel was featured in UGG's "Gift of Feeling" campaign, alongside artists such as JT, Lunay, and Yeat, and in an ad campaign for a collaboration between Warby Parker and Rare Beauty. Later in the month, Katseye postponed three concerts on its Wildworld Tour after Skiendiel had sustained a concussion. This occurred at a time when Katseye members Manon Bannerman and Sophia Laforteza were already on hiatus for health reasons. Days later, Skiendiel returned to performing onstage in a more limited capacity, while wearing sunglasses as a protective measure, which prompted audience and media discussion about health risks.

== Discography ==
As a contestant of Dream Academy, Skiendiel participated in the promotional release of the contestants' shared songs for competition. It was performed on November 17, 2023, and released to streaming platforms on August 21, 2024.

Title	Year	Album
"Girls Don't Like" (as part of The Debut: Dream Academy)	2024	The Debut: Dream Academy - Live Finale
"All The Same" (as part of The Debut: Dream Academy)	2024	The Debut: Dream Academy - Live Finale

== Filmography ==
=== Film ===
Year	Title	Role	Notes	Ref.
2015	Jurassic World	Park Visitor	Uncredited	
2021	Ripple Effect	Ivy	Short film	
2026	Katseye: Wild Hearts	Herself	Documentary	

=== Television ===
Year	Title	Role	Notes	Ref.
2018	Raven's Home	Dancer	Episode: "The Missteps"	
2021	Sydney to the Max	Tamira	Episode: "Tearin' Up My Room"	
2022	Bosch: Legacy	Student	Episode: "One of Your Own"	
2023	Dream Academy	Herself (contestant)	Reality TV program	
2024	Pop Star Academy: Katseye	Herself	Documentary series	

=== Music video appearances ===
Music video appearances
Year	Song title	Artist	Ref.
2017	"Bohemian Rhapsody"	Samantha Gangal	
2025	"Nothing On U"	Bazzi	
2026	"Madwoman"	Laufey	
