= Nadia Hallgren =

American filmmaker

Nadia Hallgren is an Emmy-nominated filmmaker, director, and cinematographer with a personal approach to storytelling. She rose to prominence with Becoming (2020), an intimate documentary she both directed and shot following Michelle Obama's book tour and offering a revealing glimpse into the former First Lady's life beyond the White House.

== Early life and education ==
Born and raised in the Bronx, Hallgren developed an early passion for photography, storytelling, and visual arts that would shape her creative path. She honed her craft at the International Center of Photography before pursuing filmmaking and cinematography at Hunter College, where she found a mentor in acclaimed filmmaker Kirsten Johnson.

== Career ==
Before stepping behind the camera as a director, Hallgren built a career as a cinematographer, serving as Director of Photography on the Academy Award-nominated Trouble the Water and the Sundance prize-winning films Trapped and Motherland. This early work as a Director of Photography informs the visual style that defines her directorial work today.

Hallgren's directing credits showcase her range and cultural impact. After Maria (Netflix) captured the human toll of Hurricane Maria and was shortlisted for the Academy Award for Best Documentary Short Subject. Becoming (Netflix), her landmark portrait of Michelle Obama, earned four Emmy nominations including Best Director and became one of the most-watched documentaries in Netflix history. Civil (Netflix) followed civil rights attorney Ben Crump as he represented the families of George Floyd, Ahmaud Arbery, and Breonna Taylor, winning the NAACP Award for Best Documentary. Most recently, she directed Pop Star Academy: KATSEYE (Netflix), chronicling the high-stakes 18-month journey behind the formation of the viral global girl group, and VICTORIA BECKHAM, an intimate portrait of the pop icon turned fashion mogul that premieres on Netflix October 9, 2025.

Hallgren made history with Becoming (2020). The Netflix documentary earned four Emmy nominations, including Outstanding Directing and Outstanding Cinematography for a Nonfiction Program, making Hallgren the first person ever nominated in both categories for the same project. The film also received nominations for Outstanding Documentary or Nonfiction Special and Outstanding Music Composition.

Hallgren is a member of the Academy of Motion Picture Arts and Sciences and serves on the board of the Bronx Documentary Center, a nonprofit organization that brings film and photography to underprivileged communities in the Bronx.

== Filmography ==
- Victoria Beckham (2025)
- Sabbath Queen (2024)
- Civil: Ben Crump (2022)
- Black and Missing (2021)
- Crossings (2021)
- Becoming (2020)
- After Maria (2019)
- She's The Ticket (2017)
- Motherland (2017)
- Trapped (2016)
- Suited (2016)
- Hamilton's America (2016)
- The Hunting Ground (2015)
- Girl Rising (2013)
- Searching for Sugarman (2012)
- War Don Don (2010)
- Trouble the Water (2008)
- Fahrenheit 9/11 (2004)
