= Manon Bannerman =

Swiss singer (born 2002)

- Bannerman in 2025
- Born: Meret Manon Sarpong Bannerman; June 26, 2002 (age 24); Lucerne, Switzerland
- Occupation: Singer
- Years active: 2020–present
- Musical career
- Genre: Pop
- Instrument: Vocals
- Years active: 2024–present
- Labels: Hybe UMG; Geffen
- Member of: Katseye

Meret Manon Sarpong Bannerman (born June 26, 2002), also known mononymously as Manon, is a Swiss singer. She began her career through her social media presence on Instagram and TikTok. As a singer, she became the first Black artist to sign with a Hybe label, debuting as a member of the girl group Katseye in 2024, formed through the 2023 competition reality show Dream Academy.

== Early life ==
Bannerman was born on June 26, 2002, in Lucerne, Switzerland, to a Swiss-Italian mother and Ghanaian father. She was raised in Zurich, where she spent most of her childhood. She has one older sister. She speaks English, Swiss German and German.

Since she was four years old, Bannerman knew she wanted to be on stage. Her father would refer to her as "Beyoncé", comparing her aspiration of becoming an artist to the American singer.

Her full name is Meret Manon Sarpong Bannerman. While spending a year as an exchange student in Los Angeles, she began going by her middle name, "Manon", due to her classmates pronouncing her given name, "Meret", strangely. "Sarpong" is her Ghanaian name.

Bannerman attended the Atelierschule in Zurich, with an "artistically" oriented teaching style. She put a focus in music and arts throughout her teenage years, stating her goal of becoming "as famous as Beyoncé", her "biggest idol". She has described being brought up on stage at German musician Cro's concert as an important moment that made her realize what she wanted to do.

== Career ==
=== 2020–2023: Social media beginnings and Dream Academy ===
In 2020, Bannerman began posting on Instagram and TikTok as an influencer. She also began acting in music videos, appearing in works for artists such as Swiss pop musician Benjamin Amaru and German rapper Badchieff. She has worked with several brands, including Laura Mercier and Charles & Keith.

In 2022, Bannerman was scouted through social media by Hybe casting manager Michelle Kim. She was invited to participate in a global casting competition organized by Hybe and Geffen Records, in plans to form a "global" girl group. Bannerman originally dismissed the offer as a scam, but after verifying its authenticity, she accepted the invitation and then auditioned.

In 2023, Bannerman became one of 20 finalists entering as a participant on the talent competition reality show Dream Academy. She joined the training program despite having no prior experience in dancing or professional singing. Bannerman placed among the final six contestants, marking her debut with Katseye. In the Dream Academy docuseries Pop Star Academy: Katseye, Bannerman was praised for her "star power", a term used by Hybe and Geffen executives to describe her potential as a pop star. Casting manager, Kim described her as "an aura that was calming yet vibrant", adding: "It's not something you can quantify with science or math—it's a feeling, an undeniable presence".

=== 2024–present: Debut with Katseye and hiatus ===
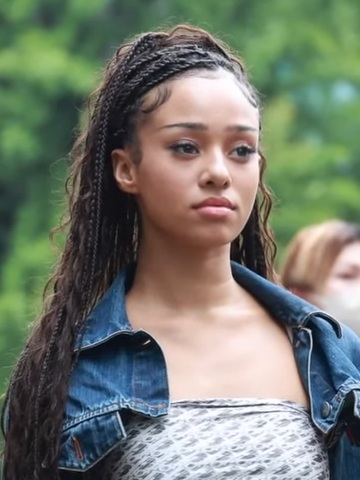
Bannerman in 2024

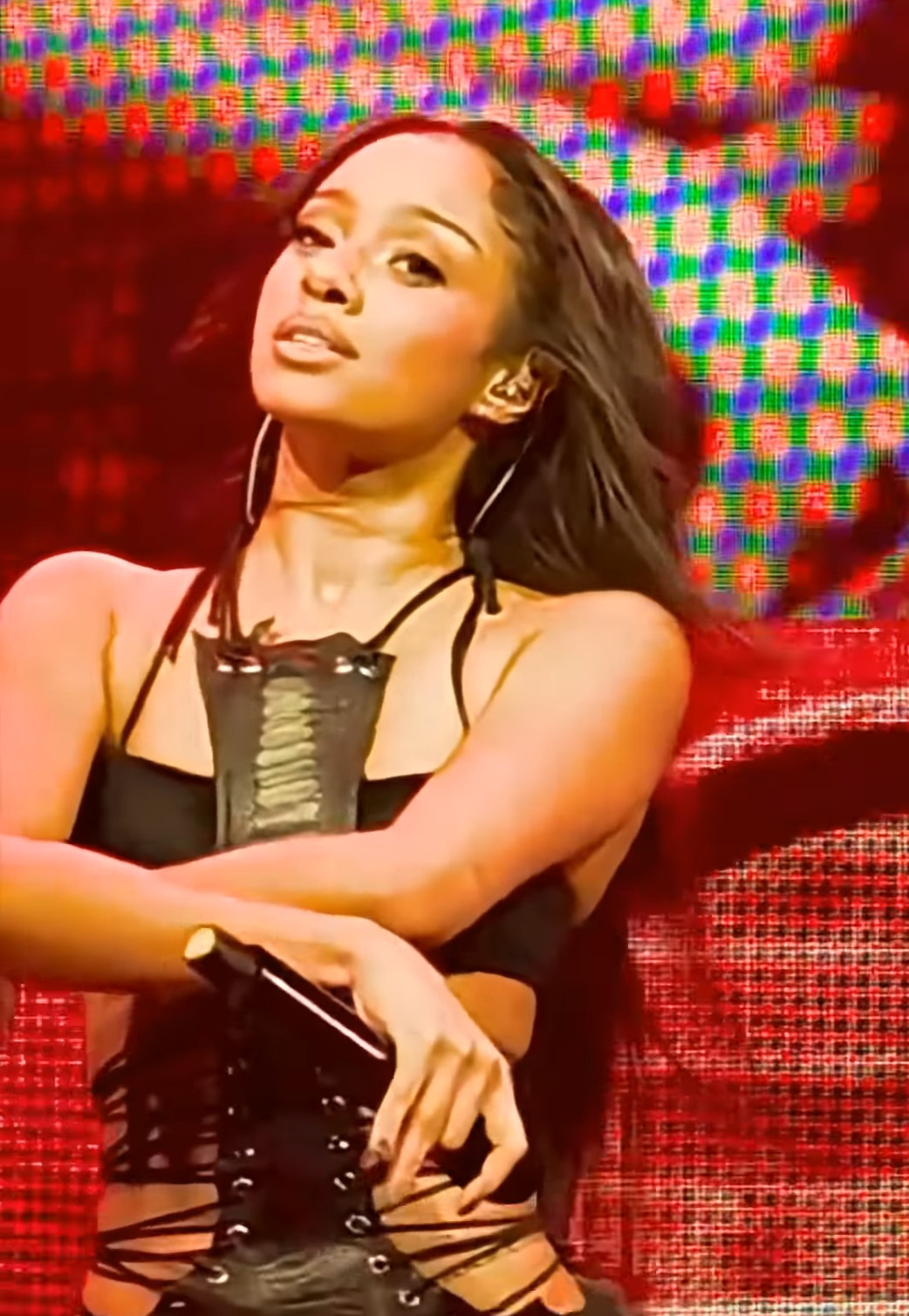
Bannerman performing "Gabriela" with Katseye in 2025

On June 28, 2024, Bannerman debuted with Katseye through their single "Debut". As a member of Katseye, Bannerman became the first Black artist to sign with Hybe. In 2025, Swiss media noted Bannerman for being the first Swiss woman to win an MTV Video Music Award, when Katseye won the Push Performance of the Year award for "Touch". They again commended her for being the first Swiss artist to be nominated for a Grammy General Field award and also perform at the ceremony when Katseye performed at the 68th Annual Grammy Awards. In 2026, Bannerman starred in Not Bad, a short film directed by her friend Sophie Hall-Mochkatel, which was shared on January 27. It has been interpreted as a commentary on society's expectations upon young women, especially compared to men. Mega's Rafael Bautista praised Bannerman's acting in the film, particularly the way she communicated her character's "physical, mental, and emotional strain" without using words.

On February 20, Katseye announced that Bannerman would be taking a temporary hiatus from the group to "focus on her health and wellbeing". The announcement received substantial coverage in entertainment media, and spurred considerable speculation on social media. Some media outlets discussed the hiatus in the context of Bannerman's position as the only Black member of Katseye. Other artists, including SZA, Chloe Bailey and Leigh-Anne Pinnock, expressed support for her, with the BBC noting Pinnock's comments in light of her own experience as the only Black member of Little Mix.

In April, Bannerman said that she and Hybe x Geffen were having "positive conversations" and that she felt supported. Around the same time, media outlets noted that she had removed "Katseye" from her Instagram bio, which renewed speculation about the future of her hiatus. Her absence remained a focus of coverage during Katseye's next activities; she did not appear in the group's single "Pinky Up" or its music video. Hybe later confirmed that she would not participate in Katseye's Coachella debut, though media noted she was present at the festival, as well as making an appearance onstage during PinkPantheress's set. In interviews surrounding the performance, Katseye's members expressed their support for Bannerman during her hiatus.

In May, she was featured in an advertisement for fashion brand Tommy Hilfiger, showing her taking a hot lap with professional racing driver Sergio Pérez. On May 8, Billboard confirmed that she was set to appear in the 21st season of Germany's Next Topmodel, where she featured as a guest judge in the penultimate episode of the season. In June, Bannerman attended Jacquemus's Spring/Summer 2027 runway show titled "Le Bonheur", held in the French commune of L'Île-Rousse.

== Discography ==
As a contestant of Dream Academy, Bannerman participated in the promotional release of the contestants' shared songs for competition. It was performed on November 17, 2023, and released to streaming platforms on August 21, 2024.

Title	Year	Album
"Dirty Water" (as part of The Debut: Dream Academy)	2024	The Debut: Dream Academy - Live Finale
"All The Same" (as part of The Debut: Dream Academy)	2024	The Debut: Dream Academy - Live Finale

== Videography ==
=== Music video appearances ===
Music video appearances
Year	Song title	Artist	Ref.
2020	"September Skies"	Benjamin Amaru	
2021	"Chandelier"	Cobee	
2021	"Parkhaus"	Badchieff	
2022	"Baby Blizzard"	Baby B3ns	

== Filmography ==
=== Television programs ===
Year	Title	Role	Ref.
2023	Dream Academy	Contestant	
2024	Pop Star Academy: Katseye	Herself	
2026	Germany's Next Topmodel	Herself	

=== Films ===
Year	Title	Notes	Ref.
2026	Not Bad	Short film	
2026	Katseye: Wild Hearts	Documentary	
