= Lara Raj =

American singer (born 2005)

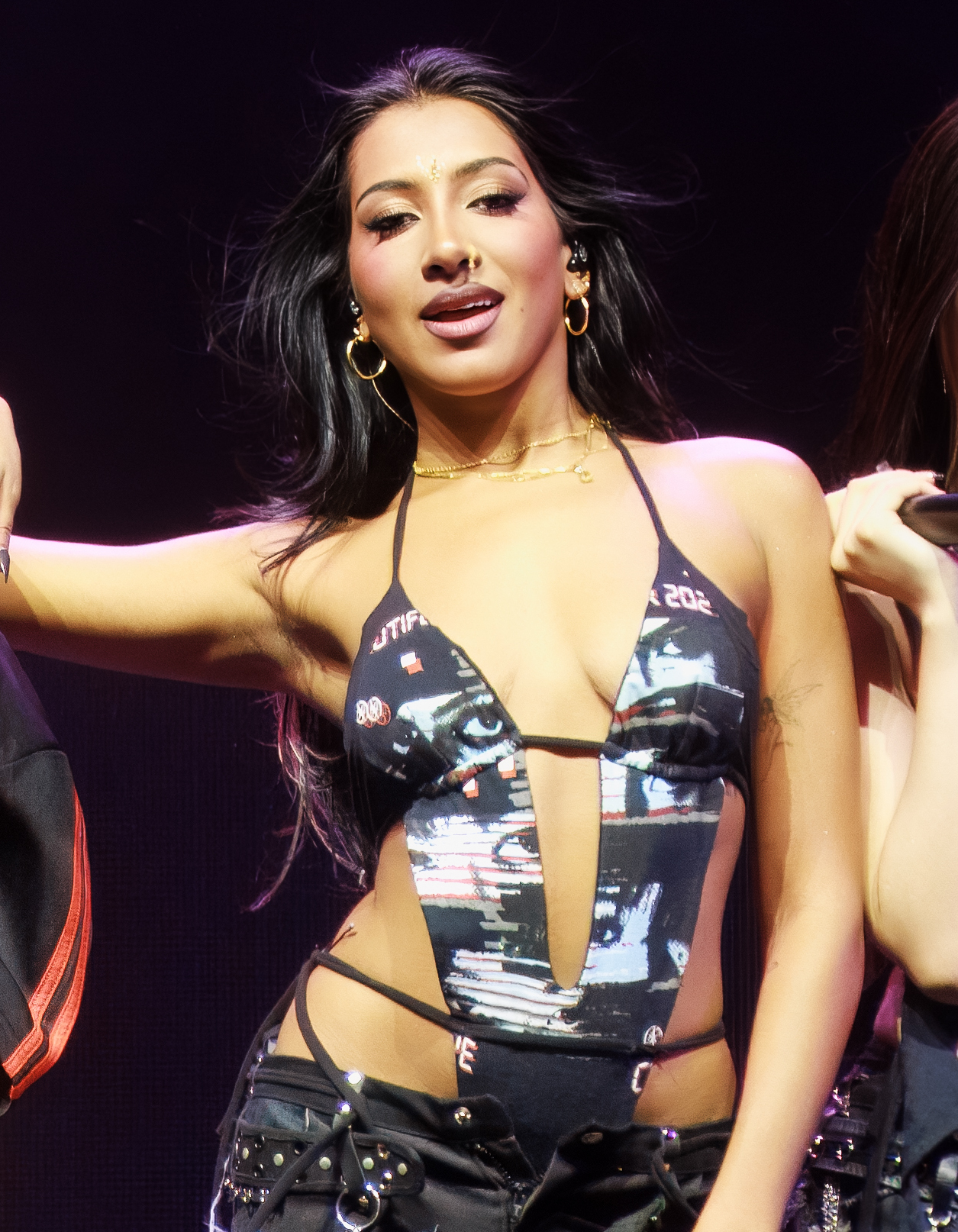
- Raj in 2025
- Born: Lara Rajagopalan; November 3, 2005 (age 21); Stamford, Connecticut, U.S.
- Occupation: Singer
- Years active: 2010–present
- Relatives: Rhea Raj (sister)
- Musical career
- Genre: Pop
- Instrument: Vocals
- Years active: 2024–present
- Labels: Hybe UMG; Geffen
- Member of: Katseye

Signature
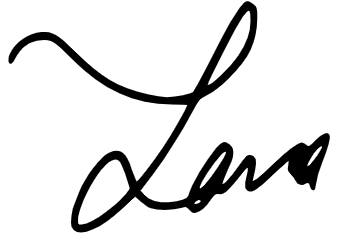

Lara Rajagopalan (born November 3, 2005), known professionally as Lara Raj, is an American singer. In 2024, she made her debut as a member of Katseye, a girl group formed through the 2023 reality show Dream Academy created by Hybe and Geffen Records.

== Early life ==
Lara Rajagopalan was born on November 3, 2005 in Stamford, Connecticut, in the United States, to Tamil immigrants, Kavita and Srivastan Rajagopalan. Lara's mother is a Bharatnatyam dance teacher and chef, while her father is a businessman. Her older sister, Rhea, is a singer-songwriter with whom she learned how to produce music and shared a love for creating music.

Raj spent her childhood in Dallas, before moving to New York City in Manhattan's Upper West Side. In New York, Raj attended middle school at Professional Performing Arts School and high school at LaGuardia High School.

== Career ==
=== 2010–2022: Career beginnings and early work ===
Raj began performing when she was five years old. She took vocal lessons, and participated in acting training and dance classes as a child living in Dallas. Raj began performing with Septien Entertainment Group, an artist development group, at venues like the House of Blues, Hard Rock Cafe, and Six Flags. After winning a singing competition, Raj was accepted into a professional program and moved to New York City.

As a preteen, Raj made a brief appearance on The Blacklist and appeared in commercials for Macy's and Spotify. As a teenager, Raj was a company dancer at Broadway Dance Center.

As a teenager, Raj was also involved in public speaking and modeling, having hosted segments for the American Heart Association's "Go Red for Women" campaign. In 2019, Raj appeared in a principal role in former First Lady Michelle Obama's Global Girls Alliance campaign launch video.

=== 2023–present: Dream Academy and debut with Katseye ===
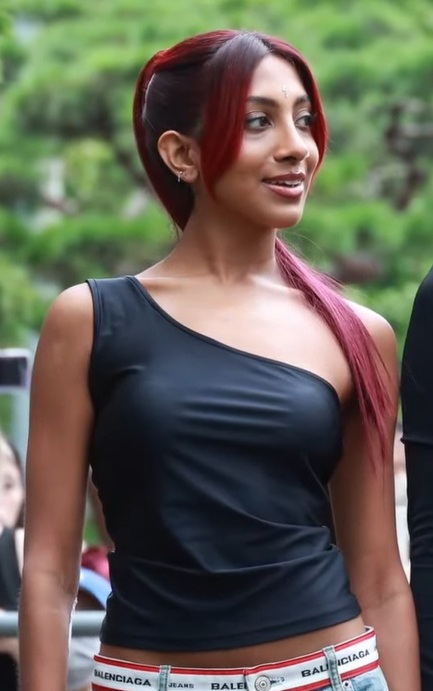
Raj in 2024

Lara Raj first gained attention by posting song covers on social media, which led to her being scouted to join The Debut: Dream Academy, a talent competition program created by Hybe and Geffen Records as part of their initiative to create a "global girl group". By the finale in November 2023, Raj placed second overall, securing her position in Katseye, and temporarily becoming the group's leader before giving the position to bandmate Sophia Laforteza. As a result, she became the first Sri Lankan-origin artist to sign under a Hybe label. The group's formation process was later chronicled in the 2024 Netflix docuseries Popstar Academy: Katseye. Raj is credited for proposing that the group's initial name, "Catseye", be changed to the stylized form "Katseye", a suggestion that was ultimately adopted.

In February 2026, Raj starred in rapper Baby Keem's music video for "Birds & the Bees", playing a character in a toxic relationship with Keem. She became the first member of Katseye to contribute to one of group's songs as a lyricist when "Unloveu", co-written with Amy Allen and Ross Golan, was included as a bonus track in editions of their August 2026 EP Wild. In September 2026, she appeared on a remix of Dhee's "Vari Vari (Unna Kaadhaliche)".

In October 2026, Raj was announced to perform at the inaugural international edition of the Weverse Con Festival in India in 2027.

== Media image ==
Raj is an advocate of South Asian representation in media. She appears with culturally specific adornments like a bindi, an Om necklace, and bangles. During Katseye's "Better in Denim" campaign with Gap, Raj spoke about how important it was for young brown girls to see someone who looks like them on billboards, saying that her mission is to make the South Asian community feel "uplifted, powerful and confident". Raj cites inspiration from South Asian women like Maitreyi Ramakrishnan, Avantika Vandanapu, and Ramisha Sattar.

Vogue India's Nancy Uddin praised Raj for embracing a confident "bombshell" aesthetic and challenging stereotypes about Indian beauty. Teen Vogue commended Raj for promoting body positivity and speaking out against diet culture. Raj was featured in The New York Times' Midi crossword puzzle.

On her clothing style, Raj said, "Some days I love to be super feminine and I love to show a bunch of skin and really be super girly. And then some days I love to be more masculine, baggy clothes, and really have my tattoos out."

== Personal life ==
Her grandmother, whom Raj considered a "spiritual anchor", gifted her a cat's eye crystal before her death. Soon after, when Raj was selected to be a part of the final group and its name was revealed to be "Katseye", she felt it was "destiny".

In March 2025, Raj publicly came out as queer to fans on the idol–fan messaging app Weverse, stating that she had "known I was queer since I was a kid". Raj subsequently received the "Blooming Impact Award" from the Los Angeles LGBT Center and was included in GLAAD's list of influential LGBTQ youth aged 20 and below.

In an interview with BBC News' Mark Savage, Raj revealed the impact of racist comments, including death threats, upon her mental health. She explained that she deleted her X account to avoid seeing such comments.

== Discography ==
As a contestant of Dream Academy, Raj participated in the promotional release of the contestants' shared songs for competition. They were performed on November 17, 2023, and released to streaming platforms on August 21, 2024.

Raj has contributed studio background vocals for her sister Rhea Raj's tracks. Rhea collaborated with her on the writing and production of one of her tracks.

As lead artist

Title	Year	Album
"Dirty Water" (as part of The Debut: Dream Academy)	2024	The Debut: Dream Academy - Live Finale
"All The Same" (as part of The Debut: Dream Academy)	2024	The Debut: Dream Academy - Live Finale

As featured artist

Title	Year	Album
"Vari Vari (Unna Kaadhaliche)" (Dhee feat. Lara Raj)	2026	Non-album single

Songwriting and production credits

Title	Year	Artist	Album	Lyricist	Producer	Ref.
"Gnarly" (Lara x Lancey Foux x Slush Puppy remix)	2025	Katseye, Lancey Foux, and Slush Puppy	Non-album single	No	Yes	
"Now That Ur Gone"	2025	Rhea Raj	Commotion	Yes	Yes	
"Unloveu"	2026	Katseye	Wild	Yes	Yes	

== Videography ==
Public service announcement video

Campaign	Year	Ref.
"Welcome to the Global Girls Alliance"	2018	

Music video appearance

Music video appearances
Song title	Year	Artist	Director(s)	Ref.
"Outside"	2022	Rhea Raj	Rhea Raj, Divya Jethwani	
"Birds & the Bees"	2026	Baby Keem	Jack Begert	

== Filmography ==
Reality shows

Year	Title	Role	Network	Ref.
2023	Dream Academy	Contestant	YouTube	
2024	Pop Star Academy: Katseye	Herself	Netflix	

Films

Year	Title	Role	Notes
2016	Emoting Emojis	Piper	Short film

Television

Year	Title	Role	Notes	Ref.
2018	The Blacklist	Sara	Episode: "Sutton Ross"	

== Live performances ==
Festivals

Date	Event	City	Country	Performed song(s)	Ref.
March 27–28, 2027	Weverse Con Festival India	New Delhi	India	TBA	
