= List of Katseye live performances =

Katseye live performances
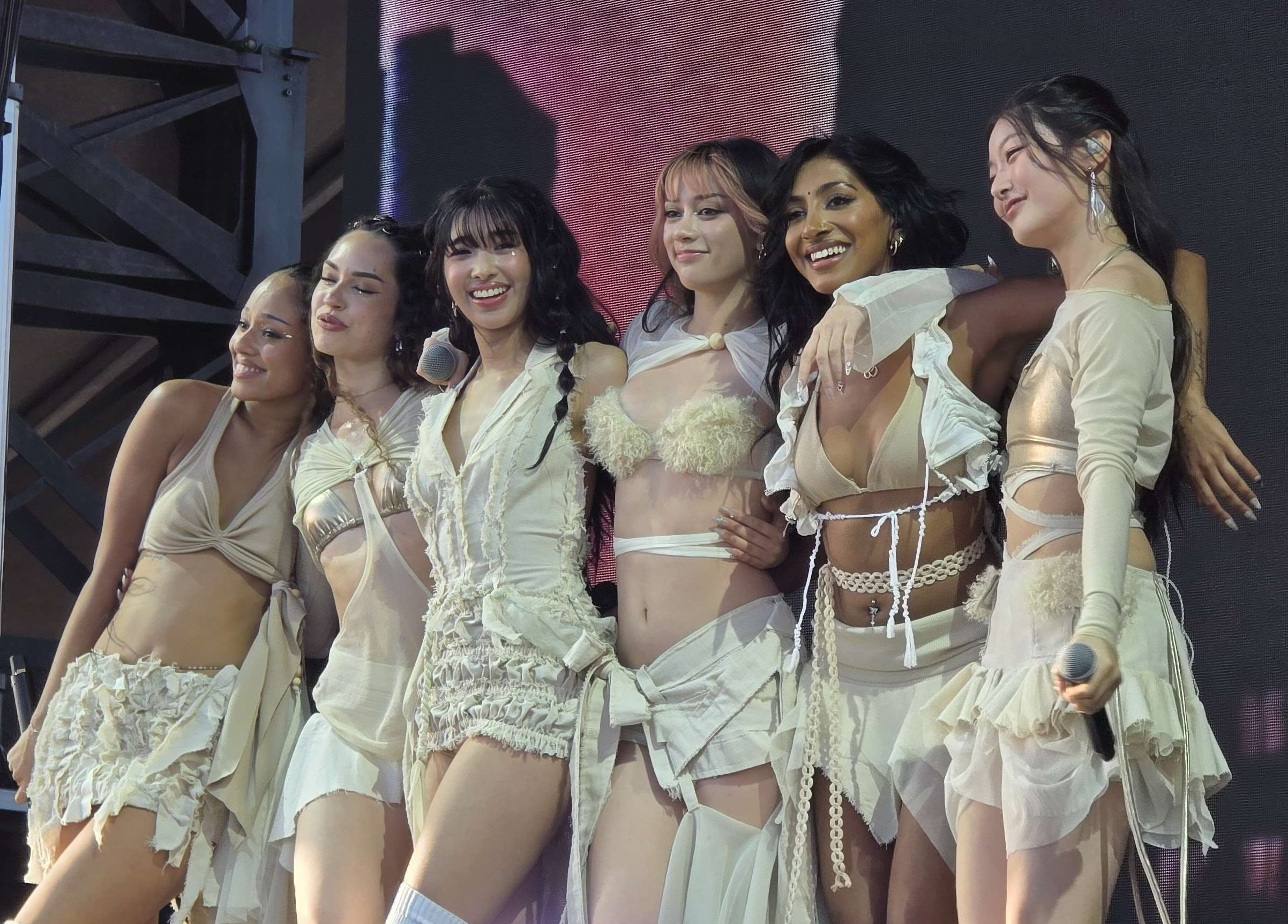
- Katseye at Wango Tango in 2025
- Concert tours: 2
- Virtual concerts: 1
- Music festivals: 13
- Award shows: 8
- TV shows and specials: 21
- Other live performances: 14

Girl group Katseye has performed in one concert tour since their debut in June 2024. The group's first concert tour commenced in November 2025 with their Beautiful Chaos Tour, which held 16 shows throughout North America.

== Concert tours ==
Title	Dates	Associated album(s)	Location(s)	Shows	Ref.
Beautiful Chaos Tour	November 15, 2025 – December 16, 2025	Beautiful Chaos	North America	16	
The Wildworld Tour	September 1, 2026 – March 5, 2027	Wild	Europe; North America; Asia; Oceania	42	

== Virtual concerts ==
Event	Dates	App	Performed song(s)	Ref.
DTI X Katseye	April 18, 2026 – May 9, 2026	Roblox (Dress to Impress)	"Pinky Up"	

== Music festivals ==
Date	Event	City	Country	Performed song(s)	Ref.
December 3, 2024	iHeartRadio Jingle Ball	Fort Worth	United States	"Debut", "My Way", "Tonight I Might", and "Touch"	
December 15, 2024	iHeartRadio Jingle Ball	Boston	United States	"Debut", "My Way", "Tonight I Might", and "Touch"	
May 10, 2025	Wango Tango	Huntington Beach	United States	"Gnarly", "Debut", "My Way", "Tonight I Might", and "Touch"	
August 3, 2025	Lollapalooza	Chicago	United States	"Gameboy", "Debut", "Tonight I Might", "My Way", "Mean Girls", "Gabriela", "Touch", "M.I.A", and "Gnarly"	
August 17, 2025	Summer Sonic	Chiba	Japan	"Gameboy", "Debut", "Tonight I Might", "My Way", "Mean Girls", "Gabriela", "Touch", "M.I.A", and "Gnarly"	
March 13, 2026	Lollapalooza Argentina	San Isidro (Note: Labeled as Buenos Aires in promotion material.)	Argentina	"Debut", "Gameboy", "I'm Pretty", "Mean Girls", "Tonight I Might", "Touch", "Internet Girl", "Flame", "Monster High Fright Song", "Gabriela", "My Way", "M.I.A", and "Gnarly"	
March 14, 2026	Lollapalooza Chile	Santiago	Chile	"Debut", "Gameboy", "I'm Pretty", "Mean Girls", "Tonight I Might", "Touch", "Internet Girl", "Flame", "Monster High Fright Song", "Gabriela", "My Way", "M.I.A", and "Gnarly"	
March 20, 2026	Festival Estéreo Picnic	Bogotá	Colombia	"Debut", "Gameboy", "I'm Pretty", "Mean Girls", "Tonight I Might", "Touch", "Internet Girl", "Flame", "Monster High Fright Song", "Gabriela", "My Way", "M.I.A", and "Gnarly"	
March 22, 2026	Lollapalooza Brazil	São Paulo	Brazil	"Debut", "Gameboy", "I'm Pretty", "Mean Girls", "Tonight I Might", "Touch", "Internet Girl", "Flame", "Monster High Fright Song", "Gabriela", "My Way", "M.I.A", and "Gnarly"	
April 10 & 17, 2026	Coachella	Indio	United States	"Pinky Up", "Debut", "Mean Girls", "Touch", "Golden" (Huntrix cover)/"Tonight I Might", (Note: Katseye performed "Golden" with Huntrix on the first weekend. They later performed "Tonight I Might" on the second weekend.) "Gameboy", "Internet Girl", "Gabriela", "My Way", "M.I.A", and "Gnarly"	
June 5, 2026	Governors Ball Music Festival	New York City	United States	"Pinky Up", "Debut", "Gameboy", "I'm Pretty", "Touch", "Tonight I Might", "Mean Girls", "Internet Girl", "Flame", "Monster High Fright Song", "Gabriela", "My Way", "M.I.A", and "Gnarly"	
July 30, 2026	Hinterland Music Festival	St. Charles	United States	"Pinky Up", "Debut", "Gameboy", "I'm Pretty", "Touch", "Mean Girls", "Animal", "Tonight I Might", "Internet Girl", "Flame", "Monster High Fright Song", "Gabriela", "My Way", "M.I.A", and "Gnarly"	
August 8, 2026	Head in the Clouds Festival	Pasadena	United States	"Pinky Up", "Debut", "Gameboy", "I'm Pretty", "Touch", "Mean Girls", "Animal", "Tonight I Might", "Internet Girl", "Flame", "Monster High Fright Song", "Gabriela", "My Way", "M.I.A", and "Gnarly"	
December 1, 2026	iHeartRadio Jingle Ball	Fort Worth	United States	TBA	
January 24, 2027	Lollapalooza India	Mumbai	India	TBA	
August 10–14, 2027	Sziget Festival	Budapest	Hungary	TBA	
August 14, 2027	Orange Warsaw Festival	Warsaw	Poland	TBA	

== Award shows ==
Date	Event	City	Country	Venue	Performed song(s)	Ref.
November 21, 2024	2024 MAMA Awards	Los Angeles	United States	Dolby Theatre	"Debut" and "Touch"	
December 28, 2024	2024 Nippon Television Annual Music Awards	Chiba	Japan	Hotel New Otani Makuhari	"Touch"	
June 21, 2025	2025 Kids' Choice Awards	Santa Monica	United States	Barker Hangar	"Gnarly"	
September 7, 2025	2025 MTV Video Music Awards	Elmont	United States	UBS Arena	"Gnarly" and "Gabriela"	
October 31, 2025	2025 NRJ Music Awards	Cannes	France	Palais des Festivals	"Gabriela"	
February 1, 2026	68th Annual Grammy Awards	Los Angeles	United States	Crypto.com Arena	"Gnarly"	
May 25, 2026	American Music Awards of 2026	Paradise	United States	MGM Grand Garden Arena	"Pinky Up"	
August 16, 2026	2026 Disney Legends	Anaheim	United States	Honda Center	“I Won't Say (I'm in Love)" (Hercules cover)	

== TV shows and specials ==
Date	Event	City	Country	Performed song(s)	Ref.
August 5, 2024	Good Morning America	New York City	United States	"Debut" and "Touch"	
September 12, 2024	M Countdown	Seoul	South Korea	"Debut" and "Touch"	
September 13, 2024	Music Bank	Seoul	South Korea	"Debut" and "Touch"	
September 14, 2024	Show! Music Core	Goyang	South Korea	"Debut" and "Touch"	
September 21, 2024	Venue101	Tokyo	Japan	"Touch"	
September 23, 2024	CDTV Live! Live!	Tokyo	Japan	"Touch"	
September 24, 2024	After School Club	Seoul	South Korea	"Debut" and "Touch"	
October 23, 2024	The Kelly Clarkson Show	New York City	United States	"Touch"	
December 31, 2024	CDTV Live! Live!	Tokyo	Japan	"My Way"	
May 1, 2025	M Countdown	Seoul	South Korea	"Gnarly"	
May 2, 2025	Music Bank	Seoul	South Korea	"Gnarly"	
May 3, 2025	Show! Music Core	Goyang	South Korea	"Gnarly"	
May 4, 2025	Inkigayo	Seoul	South Korea	"Gnarly"	
November 1, 2025	Star Academy	Paris	France	"Gabriela" (with Sarah N'Dri Youetto) and "Gnarly"	
April 30, 2026	M Countdown	Seoul	South Korea	"Pinky Up"	
May 2, 2026	Show! Music Core	Goyang	South Korea	"Pinky Up"	
May 3, 2026	Inkigayo	Seoul	South Korea	"Pinky Up"	
June 11, 2026	M Countdown	Seoul	South Korea	"Iconic by Mistake" (with Le Sserafim and Illit)	
August 12, 2026	The Tonight Show Starring Jimmy Fallon	New York City	United States	"Animal"	
August 14, 2026	Today Summer Concert	New York City	United States	"Hootie Frutti", "Pinky Up", "Gabriela", and "Animal"	
September 26, 2026	Saturday Night Live	New York City	United States	"Animal" and "Hootie Frutti"	
October 18, 2026	Victoria's Secret Fashion Show 2026	Los Angeles	United States	"Pinky Up" and "Animal"	

== Other live performances ==
Date	Event	City	Country	Venue	Performed song(s)	Ref.
August 20, 2024	SIS (Soft Is Strong) Fan Event Live	Los Angeles	United States	El Rey Theatre	"Debut", "My Way", and "Touch"	
September 18, 2024	Katseye Touchdown in Manila	Taguig	Philippines	Market! Market!	"Debut", "My Way", and "Touch"	
September 20, 2024	Hi-Touch Event	Shibuya	Japan	Tower Records Shibuya	"Touch"	
October 19, 2024	Katseye Performing Live	Bloomington	United States	Mall of America	"Debut", "My Way", "Tonight I Might", and "Touch"	
May 20, 2025	"UO Haul" Pop-up	New York City	United States	Urban Outfitters New York	"Gnarly", "Debut", "My Way", "Tonight I Might", and "Touch"	
August 18, 2025	Summer Sonic Extra	Tokyo	Japan	Yebisu Garden Hall	"Gameboy", "Debut", "Tonight I Might", "My Way", "Mean Girls", "Gabriela", "Touch", "M.I.A", and "Gnarly"	
September 18, 2025	Grammy Museum Spotlight Event	Los Angeles	United States	Grammy Museum at L.A. Live	"Touch", "Gabriela", and "Gnarly"	
September 27, 2025	A Matter of Time Tour	Los Angeles	United States	Crypto.com Arena	"Gabriela" (a cappella with Laufey)	
October 28, 2025	Exclusive London Fan Event	London	England	Exhibition White City	"Debut", "Touch", "Gabriela", and "Gnarly"	
January 29, 2026	Spotify Best New Artist Party	West Hollywood	United States	The Lot at Formosa	"Gabriela", "M.I.A", and "Gnarly"	
January 31, 2026	Universal Music Group Artist Showcase	Los Angeles	United States	NYA Studios West	"Gabriela" and "Gnarly"	
May 7, 2026	Universal Music Australia's Ignite Showcase	Sydney	Australia	The Grounds at Alexandria	"Pinky Up", "M.I.A", "Gabriela", "Touch", and "Gnarly"	
May 8, 2026	Exclusive One-Off Pop-Up Performance	Melbourne	Australia	Festival Hall	"Pinky Up", "Touch", "Debut", "Gameboy", "Gabriela", "M.I.A", and "Gnarly"	
August 11, 2026	Klub Katseye	New York City	United States	Elsewhere	"Pinky Up", "Gabriela", "That Way", "Gnarly", and "Animal"	
