= List of songs recorded by Katseye =

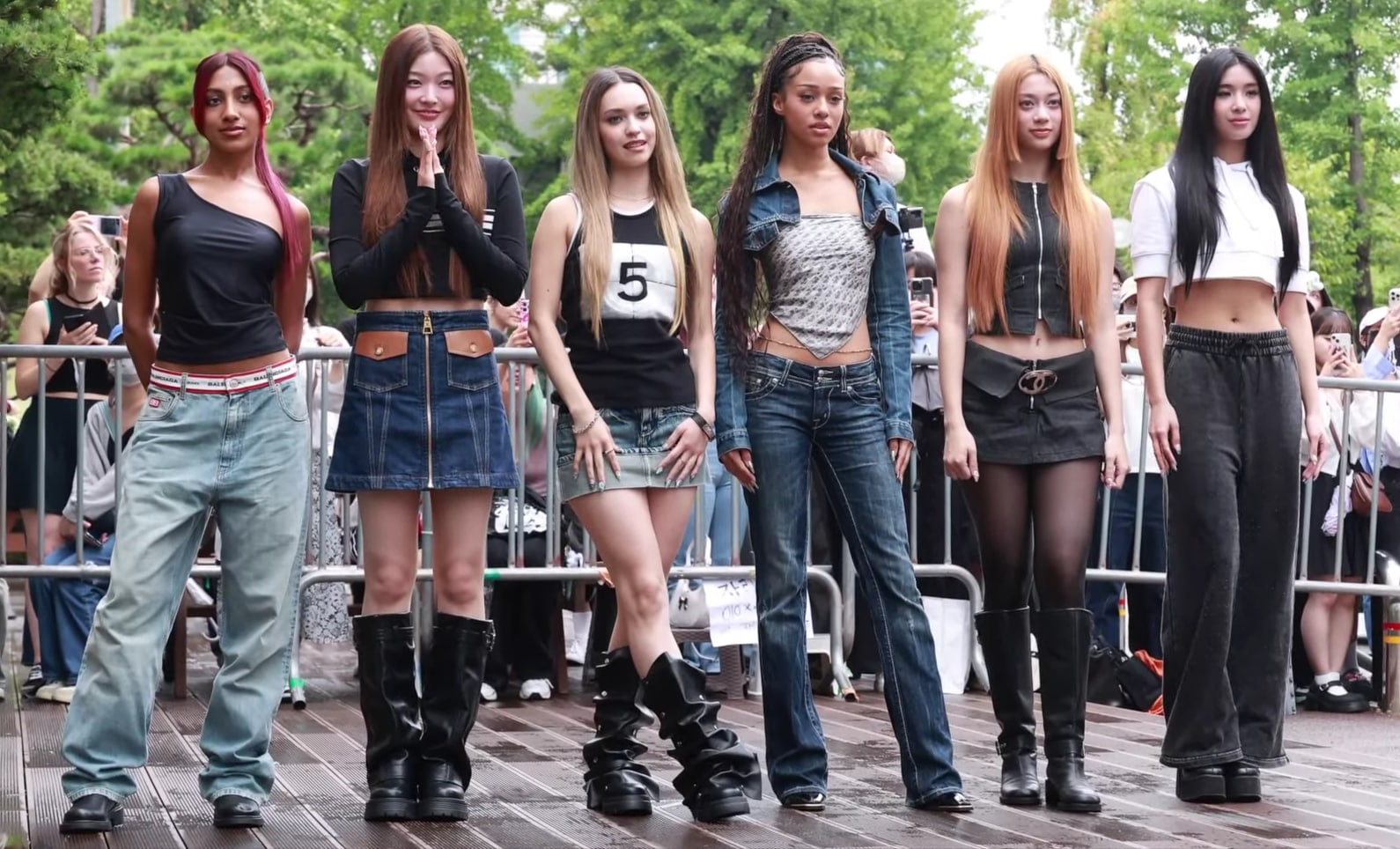
Katseye in 2024

The following is a list of songs recorded by Los Angeles-based girl group Katseye. As of October 2026, they have recorded 21 songs. (Note: Re-recorded versions not included.)

Key
| † | Indicates a single release |
| # | Indicates a promotional single release |
| ‡ | Indicates a soundtrack single release |

== Songs ==
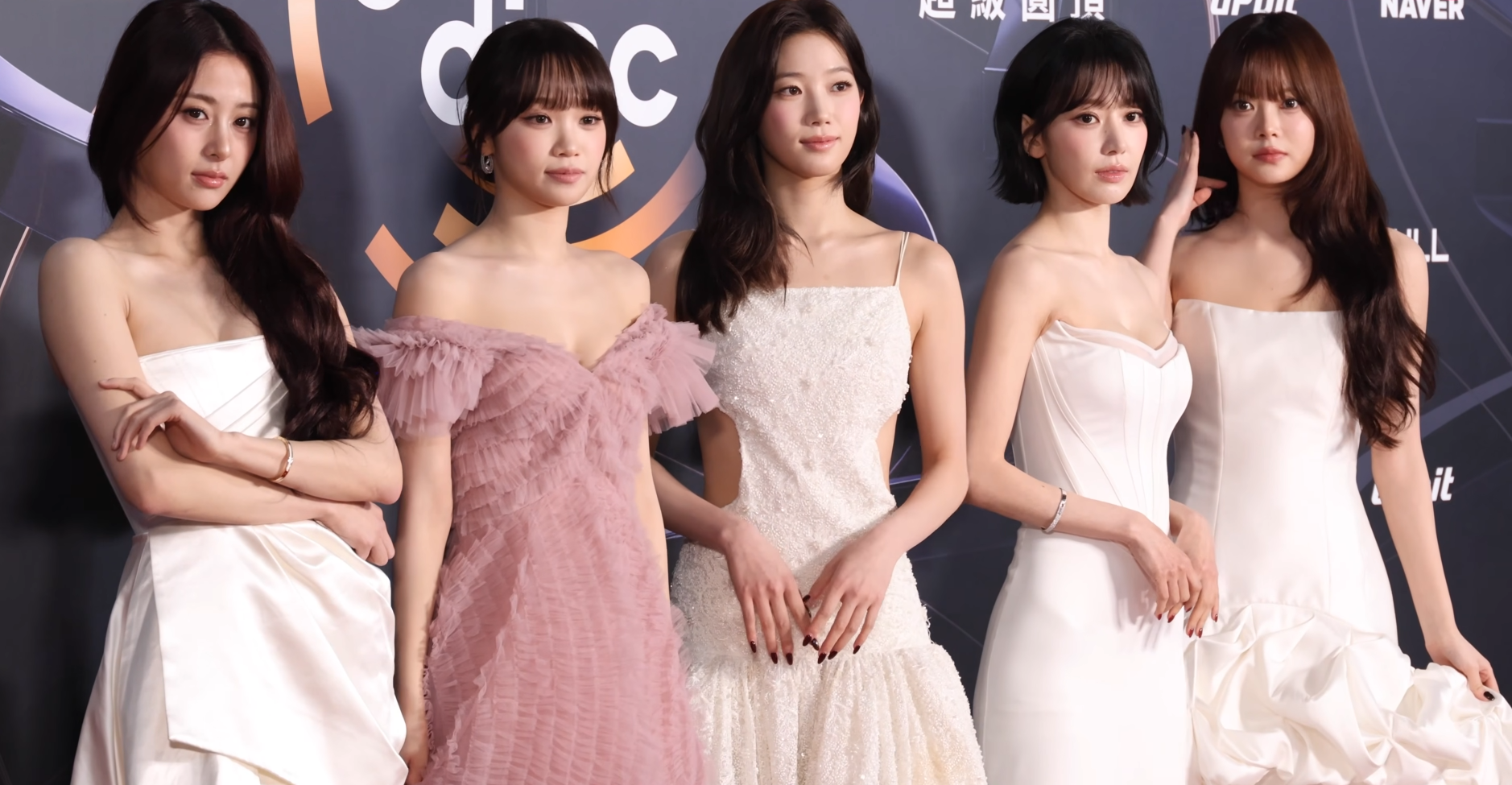
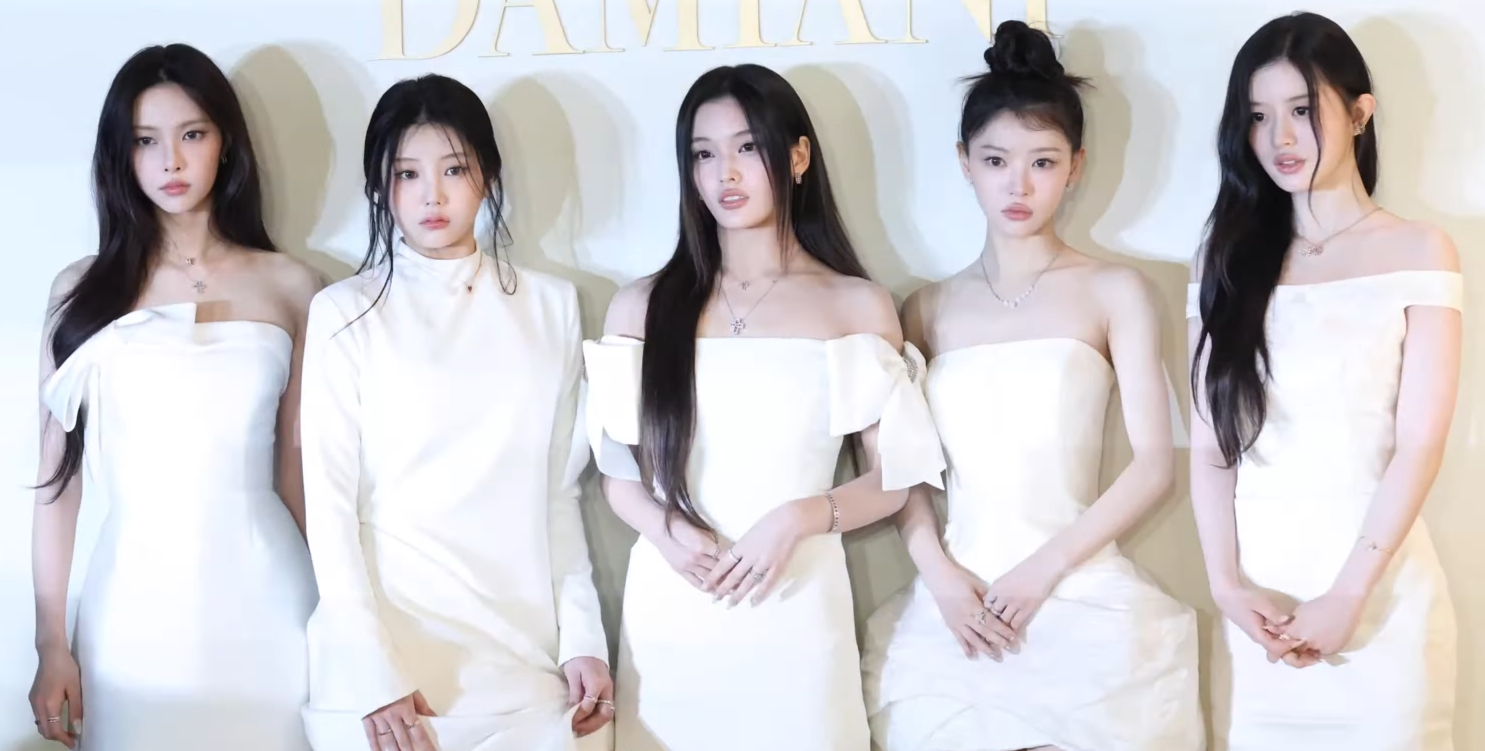
Le Sserafim (top) and Illit (bottom) collaborated with Katseye on "Iconic by Mistake".

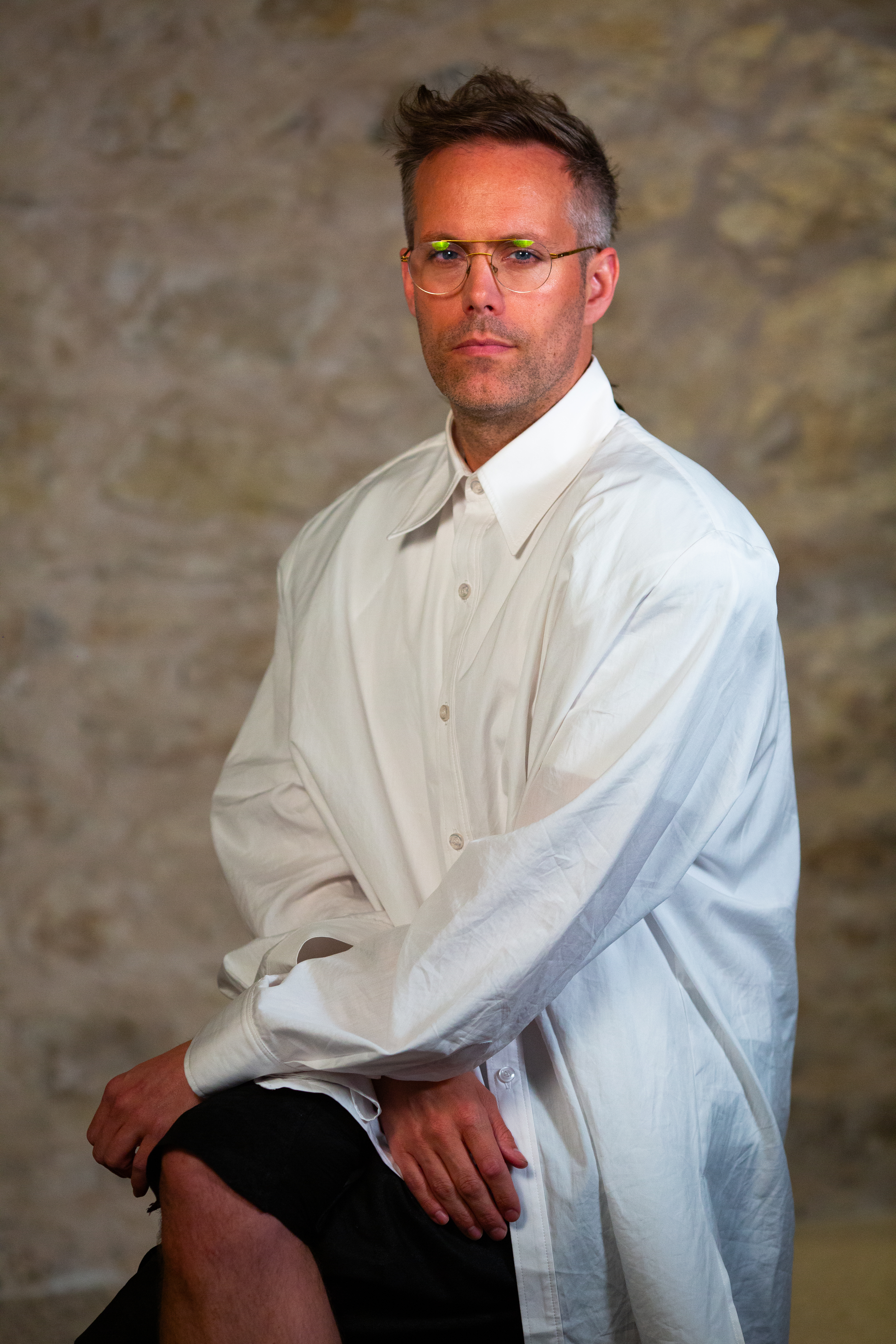
Justin Tranter co-wrote five tracks recorded by Katseye: "Iconic by Mistake", "Internet Girl", "Mean Girls", "Pinky Up", and "Tonight I Might".

Bang Si-hyuk, also known as "Hitman" Bang, co-wrote and co-produced "My Way" and "Pinky Up", while also producing "Gnarly".

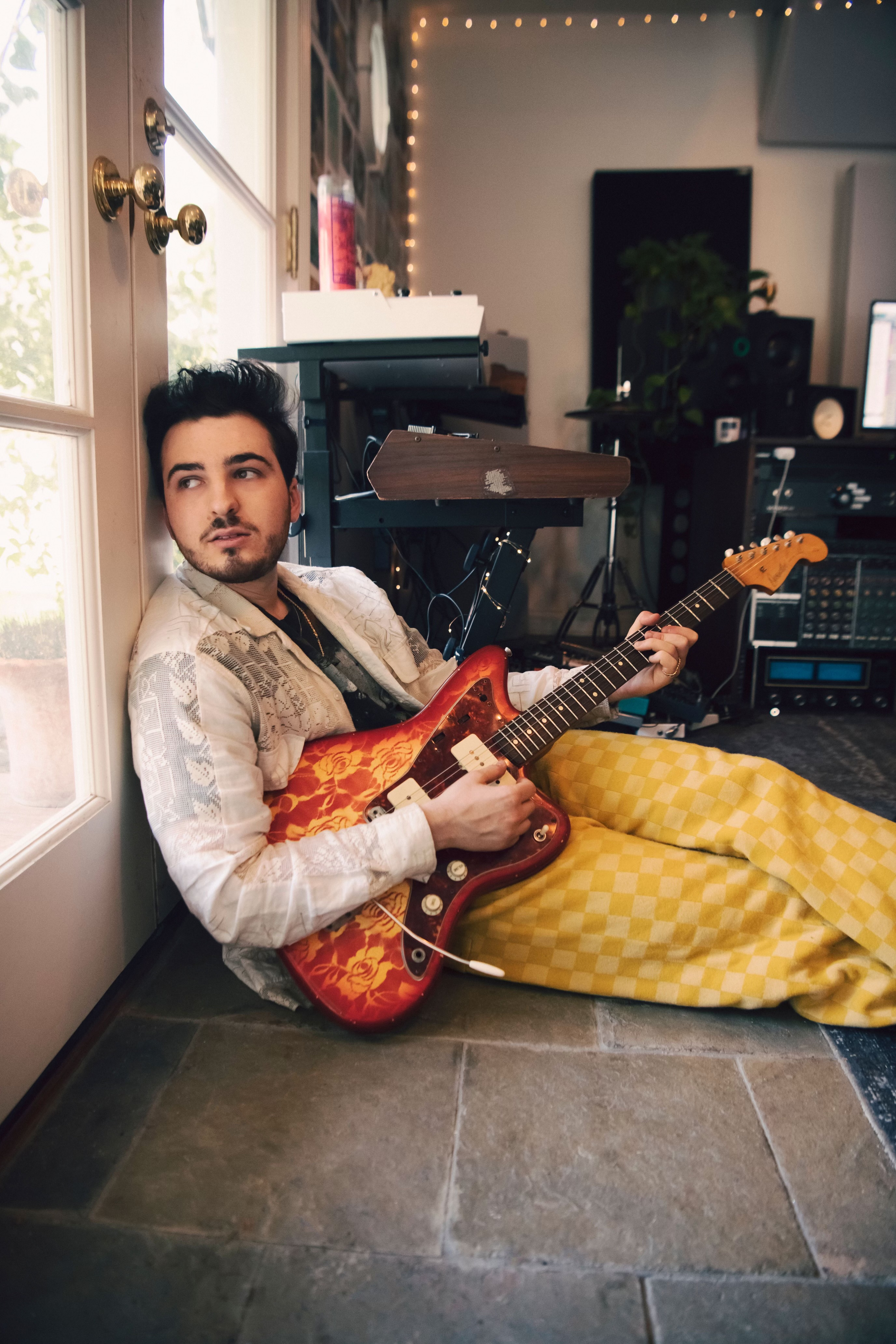
Blake Slatkin co-wrote and co-produced "Animal" and "Touch".

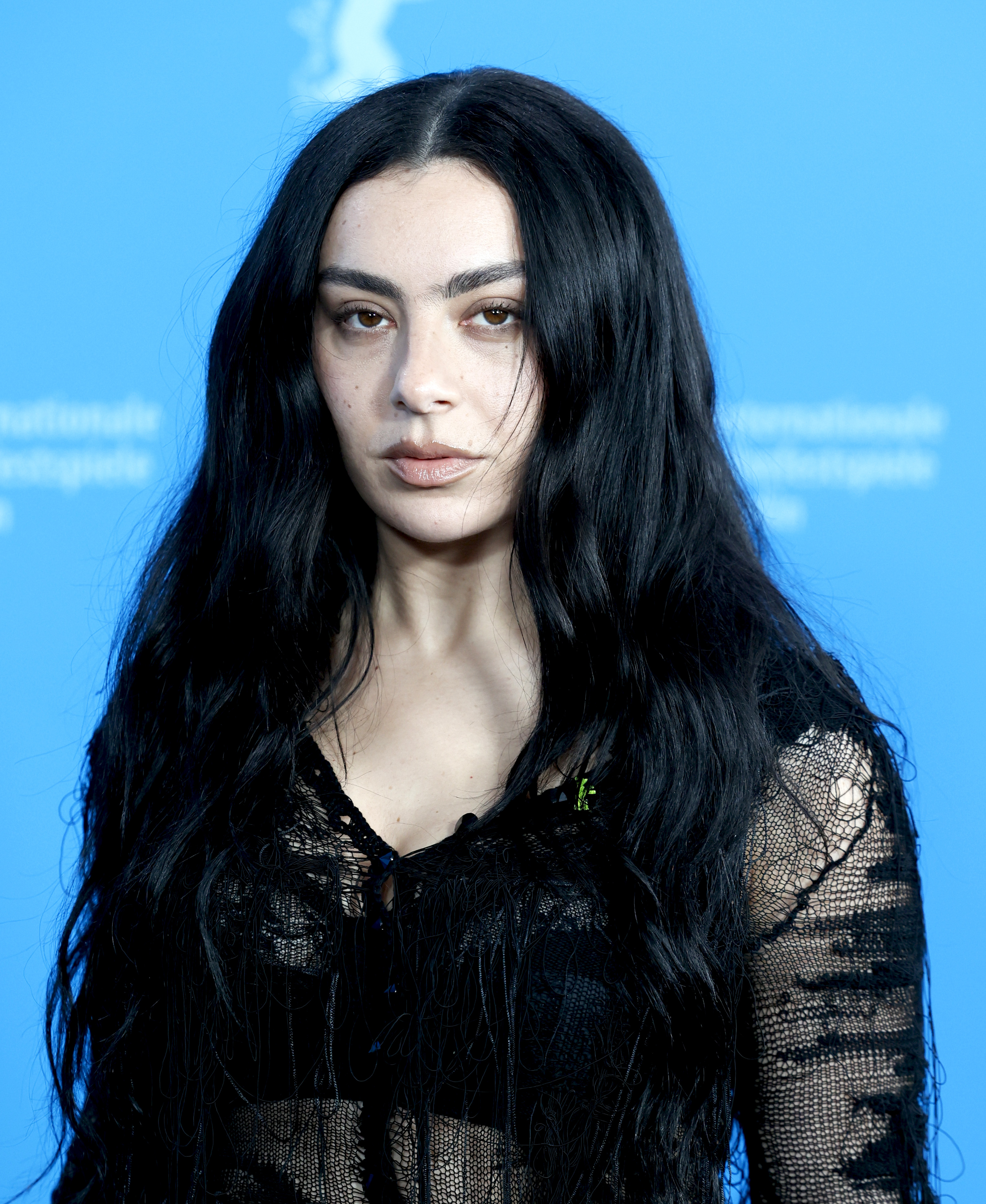
Charli XCX co-wrote "Bel Air" and "Gabriela".

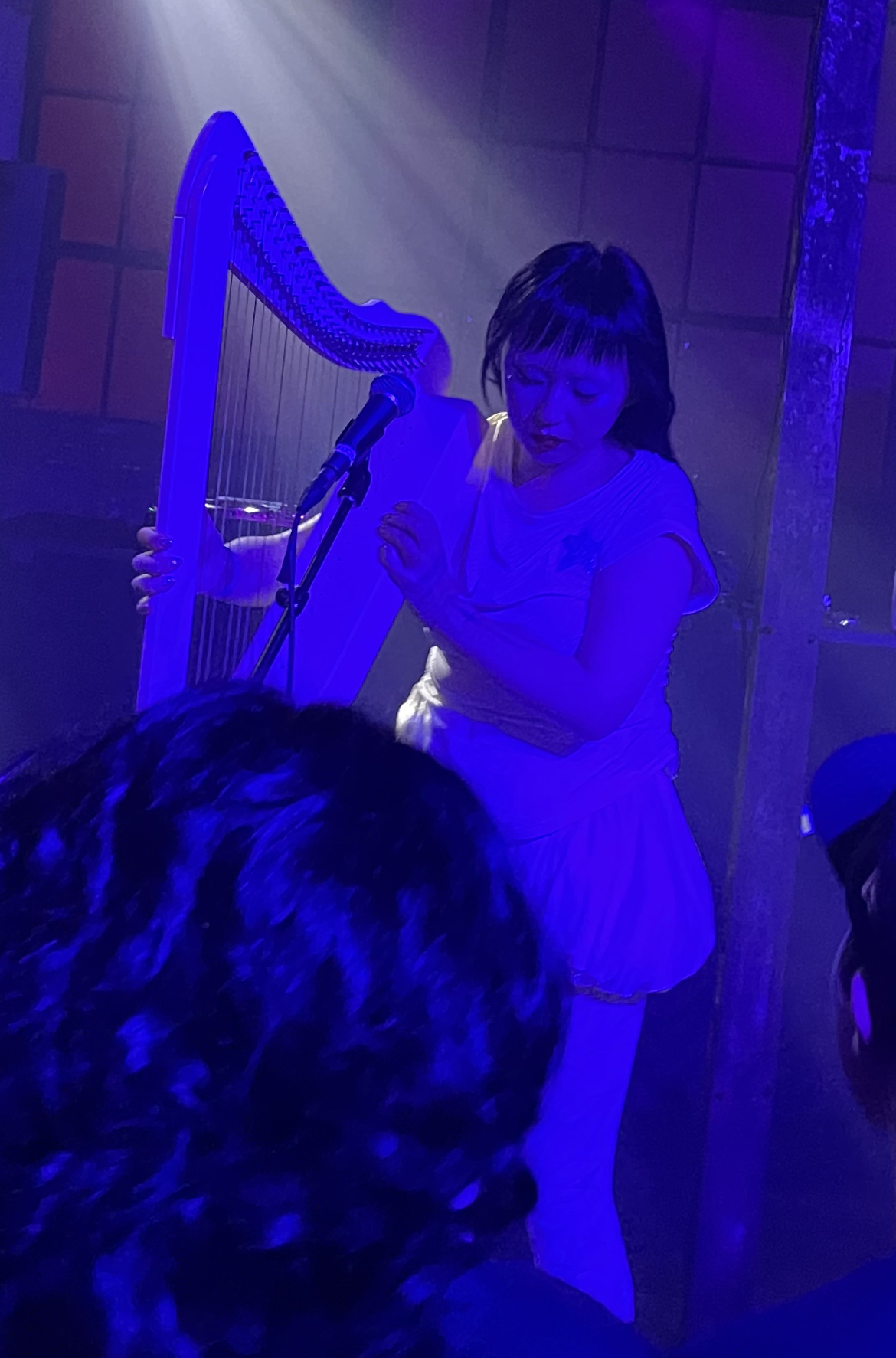
Alice Longyu Gao co-wrote "Gnarly" and "Iconic by Mistake".

| Song | Year | Writer(s) | Arranger(s) | Originating album | Ref. |
|---|---|---|---|---|---|
| "Animal" † | 2026 | Ed Sheeran; Johnny McDaid; Omer Fedi; Blake Slatkin | Omer Fedi; Blake Slatkin | Wild | |
| "Bel Air" | 2026 | Charli XCX; Noonie Bao; Kristin Carpenter; Stefan Gräslund; Patrik Berger; Martin Stilling | Kristin Carpenter; Stefan Gräslund; Patrik Berger; Martin Stilling | Wild | |
| "Debut" † | 2024 | Ryan Tedder; Tyler Spry; Grant Boutin; Omer Fedi | Ryan Tedder; Tyler Spry; Grant Boutin | SIS (Soft Is Strong) | |
| "Flame" ‡ | 2024 | Brian H. Kim | | Jentry Chau vs. the Underworld OST | |
| "Gabriela" † | 2025 | Charli XCX; Ali Tamposi; Sara Schell; Andrew Watt; John Ryan | Andrew Watt; John Ryan | Beautiful Chaos | |
| "Gameboy" † | 2025 | Jacob Kasher Hindlin; Celine Polenghi; Jackson Lee Morgan; Graham Andrew Muron | KillaGraham | Beautiful Chaos | |
| "Gnarly" † | 2025 | Alice Longyu Gao; Jacob Kasher Hindlin; Madison Love; Kyle Buckley; Tim Randolph | Pink Slip; Tim Randolph "Hitman" Bang; Slow Rabbit | Beautiful Chaos | |
| "Hootie Frutti" † | 2026 | Rachel West; Amanda Ibanez; Daniela Gonzalez; Thom Bridges | Thom Bridges | Wild | |
| "I'm Pretty" | 2024 | Amanda "Kiddo A.I." Ibanez; Nicholas Gale; Sam Roman; Richard Boardman | Digital Farm Animals | SIS (Soft Is Strong) | |
| "Iconic by Mistake" † (with Le Sserafim and Illit) | 2026 | Justin Tranter; Madison Love; Alice Longyu Gao; Brandon Colbein; Amanda Ibanez; Alyx Mendoza; Dyvahh; McKay Stevens; Sean Cook | Dyvahh; McKay Stevens; Sean Cook | Non-album single | |
| "Internet Girl" † | 2026 | Justin Tranter; Livvi Franc; Mattias Larsson; Robin Fredriksson; Shawn Wasabi | Justin Tranter; Mattman & Robin; Shawn Wasabi | Non-album single | |
| "M.I.A" | 2025 | Christopher Smith; Sophia Brenan; David Alexander; Kristin Carpenter | Risc | Beautiful Chaos | |
| "Mean Girls" | 2025 | Justin Tranter; Amanda "Kiddo A.I." Ibanez; Sam Homaee; Daniel Crean | Sam Homaee; Daniel Crean | Beautiful Chaos | |
| "Monster High Fright Song" # | 2025 | Michael Kotch; Paul Robb | Count Baldor | Non-album single | |
| "My Way" | 2024 | Amanda "Kiddo A.I." Ibanez; Ali Tamposi; John Byron "Hitman" Bang; Slow Rabbit; Federico Vindver | "Hitman" Bang; Slow Rabbit; Federico Vindver | SIS (Soft Is Strong) | |
| "Pinky Up" † | 2026 | Justin Tranter; Skyler Stonestreet; Sorana; Magsy "Hitman" Bang; Frants; David Wilson | "Hitman" Bang; Frants; Dwilly | Wild | |
| "That Way" | 2026 | Johnny Goldstein; Michael Pollack; Feli Ferraro | Johnny Goldstein | Wild | |
| "Time Lapse" ‡ | 2024 | Heo Sungjin; Erik Lidbom; Gustav Mared; Dunk | Lee Arum | Good Boy OST | |
| "Tonight I Might" | 2024 | Justin Tranter; Caroline Pennell; Jason Gill | Jason Gill; Oskar Widén; 13 | SIS (Soft Is Strong) | |
| "Touch" † | 2024 | Caroline Ailin; Jessica Porfiri; Omer Fedi; Blake Slatkin; Cashmere Cat; Taka Perry | Omer Fedi; Blake Slatkin; Cashmere Cat; Taka Perry | SIS (Soft Is Strong) | |
| "Unloveu" † | 2026 | Lara Raj; Amy Allen; Ross Golan | Ross Golan; Lara Raj | Wild (Target exlusive) | |
