= K-Pop Forever! =

Tribute act show featuring K-pop music

- Location: Europe
- Start date: February 14, 2026
- End date: October 28, 2027
- No. of shows: 230 (including shows with matinée and evening showings)
- Website: kpopforever.net

K-Pop Forever! is a tribute act concert tour and residency featuring music by various K-pop performers as well as music from the 2025 Netflix animated film KPop Demon Hunters. Produced by Taylor Entertainment, it features performances by live vocalists and dancers. The tour, which includes stops in cities across Europe, began on 14 February 2026 in Saint Peter Port, Guernsey and is set to conclude on 18 March 2027 in Saint-Étienne, France, with a residency set to run at Butlin's resorts in England from 9 February 2027 to 28 October 2027.

The tour went viral online after its show in Belfast, Northern Ireland on 19 February 2026 sparked backlash from parents over the quality of the show's performances and its appropriateness for children, believing that the show was solely a tribute to KPop Demon Hunters.

== Background ==
K-Pop Forever! is organized by Taylor Entertainment, a British live entertainment company specialized in producing touring shows that feature tribute performances to various musical acts such as Sabrina Carpenter, Olivia Rodrigo and Taylor Swift. It was first announced on 24 September 2025 through its official social media platforms, with promotional material featuring animated characters that slightly resemble the characters from the film KPop Demon Hunters. Advertised as an "all ages" event, the tour features live performances of songs from various K-pop musicians, including BTS, Blackpink and Twice, as well as songs from KPop Demon Hunters such as "Soda Pop" and "Golden". These songs are performed by four live vocalists accompanied by four backup dancers.

The first set of dates for the tour were announced on 26 November 2025, with shows in various different cities across the United Kingdom and Ireland, including the British Crown Dependency of Guernsey in the Channel Islands. On 28 January 2026, the second set of dates were announced, with shows in various cities in Europe (including France, Italy, Slovenia, Belgium, the Netherlands, Poland, North Macedonia, Croatia, Germany, Hungary, Moldova, Turkey, Bulgaria, Romania and Serbia), as well as new dates in the UK and Ireland. A date in Les Sables-d'Olonne, France was added to the tour on 13 February 2026.

On 18 March 2026, five new dates were announced, with shows in the Czech Republic, Latvia, Greece, Slovakia and Kazakhstan, along with rescheduled shows in Bucharest, Romania and Istanbul, Turkey. At the same time, Indigo Productions (the co-producer of the tour's shows in Bulgaria, France, Hungary, Moldova and Serbia) announced ten new dates, including nine additional shows in France and a new date in Switzerland, extending the tour's run until 2027. Two new shows in Lithuania and Estonia were announced by Baltic live entertainment company L Tips Agency on 17 and 22 April 2026 respectively.

On 2 September 2026, it was announced that K-Pop Forever! will hold exclusive shows at all three Butlin's resorts, located in Bognor Regis, Minehead and Skegness, England, during school holiday breaks from 9 February 2027 until 28 October 2027. To promote the tour's shows in Germany, K-Pop Forever! cast members performed on live German television on ZDF-Fernsehgarten on 27 September 2026. The next day, additional matinée shows in Prague, Czech Republic and Rennes, France were announced, as well as the cancellation of shows in Nuremberg, Düsseldorf, and Hanover, Germany; Athens, Greece; Bratislava, Slovakia; and Almaty, Kazakhstan for unknown reasons. Additional shows, including those in the United Arab Emirates, Azerbaijan, Spain, Portugal and Austria, are set to be announced at a later date.

== Reception ==
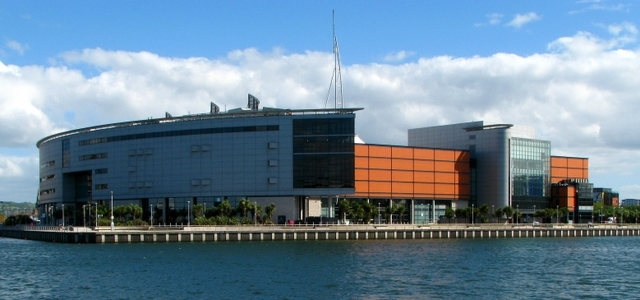
The SSE Arena, the venue for the tour's shows in Belfast, the first of which went viral online (pictured in 2008)

The tour attracted attention on social media following its sold-out show at the SSE Arena in Belfast, Northern Ireland on 19 February 2026, where it garnered a mixed reception after parents who attended the show with their children complained that the show was "too mature" for younger fans, many of whom expected that the show would center exclusively around KPop Demon Hunters, saying that some parts of the show were "a little bit raunchy" and "not appropriate for kids." Much of the criticism of the Belfast show were largely focused on its production, including explicit lyrics of the songs performed, the performers wearing skimpy outfits, "sexualized" dancing, and sound mixing issues, with some parents claiming that a performer's microphone did not function properly during the beginning of the show and alleging that some of the performers were miming. In an interview with Belfast Live, one parent described the show as a "cash grab," claiming that the performers encouraged the audience to leave positive reviews of the show in exchange for a chance to win free merchandise.

Parents also recalled that the children, most of whom went to the show dressed as characters from the film, began feeling bored and crying, resulting in people starting to leave the arena during the show's interval as songs from the film were performed at the end of the show. While describing her experience at the show with her seven-year-old daughter, a parent admitted on BBC Radio Ulster's Evening Extra that she was not aware that K-pop is a genre of popular music.

However, other attendees of the concert received the show positively, with some parents saying that their children had a "great night." An attendee told TheJournal.ie that her five-year-old niece had "the time of her life" and that it was a "brilliant night," knowing that the show was a K-pop tribute and already expected songs other than those from KPop Demon Hunters were going to be performed.

Reaction to the Belfast show spread widely on TikTok, where videos of parents who attended the show attracted large audiences and sparked an intense debate, with some online users criticising the parents and defending the show's organizers and performers, pointing out the parents' lack of research on the event prior to buying tickets and misunderstanding what they had paid to see, as the concert was clearly advertised as a tribute to K-pop music rather than a show focused entirely on KPop Demon Hunters.

In response to the criticism, the SSE Arena and Aiken Promotions (the promoter for the tour's shows in Ireland and Northern Ireland) released a statement on Facebook on 20 February, claiming that "the majority of customers enjoyed the show" and that the show was "an arena-standard tribute to the entire K-pop genre," while also admitting that they "understand that this was not what some expected." In addition, Aiken Promotions said that they took "all customers feedback seriously."

== Set list ==
The following set list is representative of the shows in the United Kingdom. It does not represent all shows throughout the tour.

1. "Jump" (Note: Blackpink cover)
2. "Debut" (Note: Katseye cover)
3. "Internet Girl"
4. "This Is For" (Note: Twice cover)
5. "Your Idol" (Note: Cover from KPop Demon Hunters (originally performed by Andrew Choi, Neckwav, Danny Chung, Kevin Woo and SamUIL Lee as the Saja Boys))
6. "Ice Cream" (Note: Blackpink and Selena Gomez cover)
7. "Gnarly"
8. "Gabriela"
9. "Touch"
10. "Gameboy"
11. "The Feels"
12. "Cupid" (Note: Fifty Fifty cover)
13. "Dynamite" (Note: BTS cover)
14. "Takedown" (Note: Cover from KPop Demon Hunters (originally performed by Ejae, Audrey Nuna and Rei Ami as Huntrix))
15. "Kill This Love"
16. "Pink Venom"
17. "Like Jennie" (Note: Jennie cover)
18. "Ddu-Du Ddu-Du"
19. "How You Like That"
20. "APT." (Note: Rosé and Bruno Mars cover)
21. "How It's Done"
22. "Soda Pop"
23. "Free" (Note: Cover from KPop Demon Hunters (originally performed by Ejae and Andrew Choi as Rumi and Jinu respectively))
24. "Strategy" (Note: Twice and Megan Thee Stallion cover)
25. "Butter"
26. "What It Sounds Like"
27. "Golden"

== Show dates ==
=== World tour ===
List of 2026 tour dates, showing date, city, country and venue
Date (2026)	City	Country	Venue
February 14	Saint Peter Port (Note: Labeled as Guernsey in promotional material.)	Channel Islands	Beau Séjour
February 15	Saint Peter Port	Channel Islands	Beau Séjour
February 18	Mullingar	Ireland	Mullingar Arts Centre
February 19	Belfast	Northern Ireland	SSE Arena
February 20	Drogheda	Ireland	The TLT
February 22 (Note: This stop has two showings, a matinée and an evening show.)	Castlebar	Ireland	TF Royal Hotel & Theatre
February 23	Belfast	Northern Ireland	SSE Arena
February 24	Cork	Ireland	Cork Opera House
February 26	Galway	Ireland	Leisureland
February 28	Kingston upon Hull	England	Middleton Hall
February 28	Skopje	North Macedonia	Boris Trajkovski Sports Center
March 1	Stoke-on-Trent	England	King's Hall
March 6	Dumfries	Scotland	Easterbrook Hall
March 7	Brussels	Belgium	ING Arena
March 8	Norwich	England	Epic Studios
March 9	Dublin	Ireland	3Arena
March 10	Dublin	Ireland	3Arena
March 11	Dublin	Ireland	3Arena
March 14	Łódź	Poland	Atlas Arena
March 14	Trowbridge	England	Civic Centre
March 20	Barnsley	England	Barnsley Metrodome
March 20	Zagreb	Croatia	Arena Zagreb
March 21	Middlesbrough	England	Middlesbrough Theatre
March 21	Zagreb	Croatia	Arena Zagreb
March 22	Rijeka	Croatia	Centar Zamet
March 22	Portobello	Scotland	Portobello Town Hall
March 27	Ljubljana	Slovenia	Arena Stožice
March 28	Maribor	Slovenia	Tabor Hall
March 28	Lanark	Scotland	Memorial Hall
March 29	Zadar	Croatia (Note: Labeled in earlier promotional material as being part of the tour's shows in Slovenia. However, it was labeled in newer promotional material as being part of the tour's shows in Croatia.)	Krešimir Ćosić Hall
March 31	Solihull	England	Core Theatre
April 2	Aberdeen	Scotland	Beach Ballroom
April 3	Arbroath	Scotland	Webster Memorial Theatre
April 3	Assago (Note: Labeled as Milan in promotional material.)	Italy	Unipol Forum
April 4	Casalecchio di Reno (Note: Labeled as Bologna in promotional material.)	Italy	Unipol Arena
April 4	Ayr	Scotland	Ayr Town Hall
April 5	Arbroath	Scotland	Webster Memorial Theatre
April 6	Felixstowe	England	Spa Pavilion
April 7	Leicester	England	Leicester Athena
April 8	Rhyl	Wales	Rhyl Pavilion
April 9	Swindon	England	Meca
April 10	Huntingdon	England	Commemoration Hall
April 11	Northallerton	England	The Forum
April 17	Oban	Scotland	Corran Halls
April 18	Airdrie	Scotland	Airdrie Town Hall
April 24	Kidderminster	England	Kidderminster Town Hall
April 25	Assago	Italy	Unipol Forum
April 25	Ossett (Note: Labeled as Wakefield in promotional material.)	England	Ossett Town Hall
April 26	Leamington Spa	England	The Assembly
May 3	Kilkenny	Ireland	The Hub
May 4	Cork	Ireland	Cork Opera House
May 6	Cork	Ireland	Cork Opera House
May 8	Galway	Ireland	Leisureland
May 9	Galway	Ireland	Leisureland
May 10	Castlebar	Ireland	TF Royal Hotel & Theatre
May 12	Cork	Ireland	Cork Opera House
May 13	Cork	Ireland	Cork Opera House
May 14	Cork	Ireland	Cork Opera House
May 16	Belfast	Northern Ireland	SSE Arena
May 22	Whitehaven	England	Civic Hall
May 23	Rotterdam	Netherlands	Rotterdam Ahoy
May 23	Weymouth	England	Weymouth Pavilion
May 24	Bath	England	Komedia
May 25	Northampton	England	The Deco
May 26	Runcorn	England	The Brindley
May 27	Coventry	England	Albany Theatre
May 28	Stamford	England	Corn Exchange
May 29	Chesterfield	England	Winding Wheel Theatre
May 30	Colchester	England	Mercury Theatre
May 31	Whitby	England	Whitby Pavilion
June 5	Killarney	Ireland	Gleneagle Arena
June 6	Killarney	Ireland	Gleneagle Arena
June 7	Castlebar	Ireland	TF Royal Hotel & Theatre
June 10 (Note: The concert was part of Live at the Marquee.)	Cork	Ireland	Cork Docklands
June 11	Cork	Ireland	Cork Docklands
June 12	Mansfield	England	Palace Theatre
June 13	Leeds	England	Pudsey Civic Hall
June 14	Hamilton	Scotland (Note: Labeled in promotional material as being part of the tour's shows in England.)	Hamilton Townhouse
June 19	Brentwood	England	Brentwood Centre
June 20	Kidderminster	England	Kidderminster Town Hall
June 27	Buxton	England	Buxton Pavilion Gardens
June 28	Newport	Wales	Riverfront Arts Centre
July 5	Wick	Scotland	Assembly Rooms
July 11	Dunoon	Scotland	Queen's Hall
July 17	Limerick	Ireland	University Concert Hall
July 18	Drogheda	Ireland	The TLT
July 19	Drogheda	Ireland	The TLT
July 25	Les Sables-d'Olonne	France	Arena Forum
July 31	Chester	England	Storyhouse
August 1 (Note: The concert was part of Camp Bestival.)	East Lulworth (Note: Labeled as Dorset in promotional material.)	England	Lulworth Castle
August 12 (Note: The concert was part of Summer Sessions.)	Letterkenny	Ireland	The Big Top
August 14	Killarney	Ireland	Gleneagle Arena
August 16	Castlebar	Ireland	TF Royal Hotel & Theatre
October 14 (Note: The concert on October 14, 2026, in Munich was originally announced to take place on October 23, 2026, at BMW Park, but was rescheduled and moved to the Circus Krone Building.)	Munich	Germany	Circus Krone Building
October 16	Hamburg	Germany	Barclays Arena
October 18	Berlin	Germany	Uber Arena
October 27 (Note: The concert on October 27, 2026, at Romexpo in Bucharest was originally announced to take place on December 8, 2026, but was rescheduled.)	Bucharest	Romania	Romexpo
November 7	Prague	Czech Republic	Prague Congress Centre
November 16	Vilnius	Lithuania	Compensa Concert Hall
November 17	Vilnius	Lithuania	Compensa Concert Hall
November 18	Tallinn	Estonia	Alexela Concert Hall
November 19	Riga	Latvia	Xiaomi Arena
November 29 (Note: The concert on November 29, 2026, in Istanbul was originally announced to take place on December 5, 2026, at the Istanbul Congress Center, but was rescheduled and moved to Ora Arena.)	Istanbul	Turkey	Ora Arena
December 1	Budapest	Hungary	László Papp Budapest Sports Arena
December 3	Chișinău	Moldova	Chișinău Arena
December 7	Sofia	Bulgaria	Arena 8888 Sofia
December 9	Belgrade	Serbia	Sava Centar
December 12	Rennes	France	Le Liberté
December 13	Floirac (Note: Labeled as Bordeaux in promotional material.)	France	Arkéa Arena
December 14	Saint-Herblain (Note: Labeled as Saint-Herblain, Nantes in promotional material.)	France	Zénith de Nantes Métropole
December 15	Poitiers	France	Arena Futuroscope
December 17	Caen	France	Zénith de Caen
December 18	Boulogne-Billancourt	France	Grande Seine
December 19	Amnéville	France	Galaxie Amnéville
December 20	Dijon	France	Zénith de Dijon
December 22	Lille	France	Zénith de Lille
December 26	Chambéry	France	Le Phare
December 27	Décines-Charpieu (Note: Labeled as Décines-Charpieu, Lyon in promotional material.)	France	LDLC Arena
December 28	Marseille	France	Le Dôme de Marseille
December 29	Toulouse	France	Zénith de Toulouse
December 30	Montpellier	France	Le Zénith Sud

List of 2027 tour dates, showing date, city, country and venue
Date (2027)	City	Country	Venue
March 5	Eckbolsheim (Note: Labeled as Strasbourg in promotional material.)	France	Zénith de Strasbourg
March 6	Reims	France	Reims Arena
March 7	Le Grand-Quevilly (Note: Labeled as Rouen in promotional material.)	France	Zénith de Rouen
March 9	Tours	France	Parc Expo de Tours
March 10	Orléans	France	CO'Met Arena
March 11	Cournon-d'Auvergne (Note: Labeled as Clermont-Ferrand in promotional material.)	France	Zénith d'Auvergne
March 12	Geneva	Switzerland	Geneva Arena
March 16	Nice	France	Palais Nikaïa
March 17	Toulon	France	Zénith Oméga de Toulon
March 18	Saint-Étienne	France	Zénith de Saint-Étienne

==== Cancelled shows ====
List of cancelled tour shows, showing date, city, venue and reason of cancellation
Date (2026)	City	Country	Venue	Reason
October 20 (Note: The concert on October 20, 2026, in Nuremberg was originally announced to take place at the PSD Bank Nürnberg Arena, but was moved to Meistersingerhalle.)	Nuremberg	Germany	Meistersingerhalle	Unknown
October 21	Düsseldorf	Germany	Mitsubishi Electric Halle	Unknown
October 22	Hanover	Germany	Swiss Life Hall	Unknown
November 22	Athens	Greece	Christmas Theater	Unknown
November 23	Bratislava	Slovakia	Tipos aréna	Unknown
November 25	Almaty	Kazakhstan	Baluan Sholak Sports Palace	Unknown

=== Residency shows ===
List of residency shows, showing date, city, country and venue
Date (2027)	City	Country	Venue
February 9	Minehead	England	Butlin's Minehead
February 10	Ingoldmells (Note: Labeled as Skegness in promotional material.)	England	Butlins Skegness
February 11	Bognor Regis	England	Butlins Bognor Regis
February 12	Bognor Regis	England	Butlins Bognor Regis
February 13	Ingoldmells	England	Butlins Skegness
February 14	Minehead	England	Butlin's Minehead
February 16	Minehead	England	Butlin's Minehead
February 17	Ingoldmells	England	Butlins Skegness
February 18	Bognor Regis	England	Butlins Bognor Regis
February 19	Bognor Regis	England	Butlins Bognor Regis
February 20	Ingoldmells	England	Butlins Skegness
February 21	Minehead	England	Butlin's Minehead
March 23	Minehead	England	Butlin's Minehead
March 24	Ingoldmells	England	Butlins Skegness
March 25	Bognor Regis	England	Butlins Bognor Regis
March 26	Bognor Regis	England	Butlins Bognor Regis
March 27	Ingoldmells	England	Butlins Skegness
March 28	Minehead	England	Butlin's Minehead
March 31	Ingoldmells	England	Butlins Skegness
April 1	Bognor Regis	England	Butlins Bognor Regis
April 2	Bognor Regis	England	Butlins Bognor Regis
April 3	Ingoldmells	England	Butlins Skegness
April 4	Minehead	England	Butlin's Minehead
April 6	Minehead	England	Butlin's Minehead
April 8	Bognor Regis	England	Butlins Bognor Regis
April 11	Bognor Regis	England	Butlins Bognor Regis
May 28	Bognor Regis	England	Butlins Bognor Regis
May 29	Ingoldmells	England	Butlins Skegness
May 30	Minehead	England	Butlin's Minehead
June 1	Minehead	England	Butlin's Minehead
June 2	Ingoldmells	England	Butlins Skegness
June 3	Bognor Regis	England	Butlins Bognor Regis
June 4	Bognor Regis	England	Butlins Bognor Regis
June 5	Ingoldmells	England	Butlins Skegness
June 6	Minehead	England	Butlin's Minehead
July 16	Bognor Regis	England	Butlins Bognor Regis
July 17	Ingoldmells	England	Butlins Skegness
July 18	Minehead	England	Butlin's Minehead
July 20	Minehead	England	Butlin's Minehead
July 21	Ingoldmells	England	Butlins Skegness
July 22	Bognor Regis	England	Butlins Bognor Regis
July 23	Bognor Regis	England	Butlins Bognor Regis
July 24	Ingoldmells	England	Butlins Skegness
July 25	Minehead	England	Butlin's Minehead
July 27	Minehead	England	Butlin's Minehead
July 28	Ingoldmells	England	Butlins Skegness
July 29	Bognor Regis	England	Butlins Bognor Regis
July 30	Bognor Regis	England	Butlins Bognor Regis
July 31	Ingoldmells	England	Butlins Skegness
August 1	Minehead	England	Butlin's Minehead
August 3	Minehead	England	Butlin's Minehead
August 4	Ingoldmells	England	Butlins Skegness
August 5	Bognor Regis	England	Butlins Bognor Regis
August 6	Bognor Regis	England	Butlins Bognor Regis
August 7	Ingoldmells	England	Butlins Skegness
August 8	Minehead	England	Butlin's Minehead
August 10	Minehead	England	Butlin's Minehead
August 11	Ingoldmells	England	Butlins Skegness
August 12	Bognor Regis	England	Butlins Bognor Regis
August 13	Bognor Regis	England	Butlins Bognor Regis
August 14	Ingoldmells	England	Butlins Skegness
August 15	Minehead	England	Butlin's Minehead
August 17	Minehead	England	Butlin's Minehead
August 18	Ingoldmells	England	Butlins Skegness
August 19	Bognor Regis	England	Butlins Bognor Regis
August 20	Bognor Regis	England	Butlins Bognor Regis
August 21	Ingoldmells	England	Butlins Skegness
August 22	Minehead	England	Butlin's Minehead
August 24	Minehead	England	Butlin's Minehead
August 25	Ingoldmells	England	Butlins Skegness
August 26	Bognor Regis	England	Butlins Bognor Regis
August 27	Bognor Regis	England	Butlins Bognor Regis
August 28	Ingoldmells	England	Butlins Skegness
August 29	Minehead	England	Butlin's Minehead
August 31	Minehead	England	Butlin's Minehead
September 1	Ingoldmells	England	Butlins Skegness
September 2	Bognor Regis	England	Butlins Bognor Regis
October 16	Ingoldmells	England	Butlins Skegness
October 19	Minehead	England	Butlin's Minehead
October 20	Ingoldmells	England	Butlins Skegness
October 21	Bognor Regis	England	Butlins Bognor Regis
October 22	Bognor Regis	England	Butlins Bognor Regis
October 23	Ingoldmells	England	Butlins Skegness
October 24	Minehead	England	Butlin's Minehead
October 26	Minehead	England	Butlin's Minehead
October 27	Ingoldmells	England	Butlins Skegness
October 28	Bognor Regis	England	Butlins Bognor Regis
