= The Wildworld Tour =

2026-2027 concert tour by Katseye

- World tour by Katseye
- Promotional poster
- Location: Europe; North America; Asia; Oceania
- Associated album: Wild
- Start date: September 1, 2026
- End date: March 6, 2027
- Legs: 3
- No. of shows: 44
- Supporting act: Filiz
- Website: www.katseye.world/live/

Katseye concert chronology
- Beautiful Chaos Tour (2025); The Wildworld Tour (2026-2027)

The Wildworld Tour is the second concert tour and first arena tour by girl group Katseye, launched in support of their third extended play, Wild (2026). The tour began on September 1, 2026, in Dublin, and is currently set to conclude on March 6, 2027, in Auckland.

Spanning forty-four shows, the Wildworld Tour is the group's first to visit Europe, Asia, and Oceania, and their first without member Manon Bannerman, who took a hiatus from the group in early 2026. Member Sophia Laforteza will be absent from in the European and North American legs of the tour due to personal reasons, but will return for the 2027 shows.

== Background and development ==
On May 13, 2026, Katseye announced that they would embark on their second concert tour and first world tour, the Wildworld Tour, spanning twenty-seven shows across Europe and North America. Pre-sales started on May 20, 2026, while general sales began on May 21, 2026.

Following tickets selling out during pre-sale, additional shows were added in London, Elmont, Los Angeles, and Mexico City, bringing the total number of shows to thirty-one. The additional shows also sold out. On October 29, dates were announced in Asia and Oceania, extending the tour to March 2027. Following overwhelming demand during pre-sale, additional shows were added in Melbourne and Sydney, bringing the total number or shows to forty-four.

Manon Bannerman is not involved with the tour, as she has been on hiatus since February 2026. On August 30, it was announced that Sophia Laforteza would not participate in the European shows for personal reasons, followed by an announcement on October 8 confirming she would also sit out the North American leg, with plans to return to the group in January 2027.

Megan Skiendiel sustained a concussion in early November 2026, resulting in three shows being postponed, her sitting down during the performance in Austin, and her wearing a heart rate monitor during subsequent shows.

== Critical reception ==
Reviewing the September 3 show in London for The Standard, Martin Robinson rated it four out of five stars and called it a "heartening joy," while describing the "top-tier pop group delivering electric choreography and a set of songs which are genuinely distinctive" as "outstanding" performers. Music correspondent of the BBC Mark Savage lamented about the "emptiness" caused by the loss of Manon Bannerman and Sophia Laforteza, but that the other four band members "worked hard to fill the gaps, hyping up the crowd with a succession of bass-heavy pop anthems and jaw-dropping dance breaks". Savage additionally refuted claims of lip-syncing, describing Lara Raj as mixing "power and emotion in a way that suggested the band have potential beyond the ear candy pop that's become their trademark". The Guardian journalist Michael Cragg gave the tour three stars out of five, describing the tour as "petulant hyperpop bops from a girl group in crisis", owing to the loss of Bannerman and Laforteza and "flaccid" and "dated" songs being the focus amongst "minimal staging". Rolling Stone UK's Ben Jolley praised the tour's second London concert awarding it four out of five stars, writing that the four touring members "prove their talents as tireless performers and formidable vocalists," and assessing that "the prospect of where they could go next is incredibly exciting."

== Setlist ==
This setlist is from the September 1, 2026, concert in Dublin, and is not intended to be representative of all shows.

1. "Hootie Frutti"
2. "Internet Girl"
3. "That Way"
4. "Touch"
5. "Mean Girls"
6. "Gabriela"
7. "Pinky Up"
8. "Animal"
9. "Tonight I Might"
10. "I'm Pretty"
11. "Time Lapse"
12. "Gameboy"
13. "Unloveu"
14. "My Way"
15. "Bel Air"
16. "M.I.A"
17. "Debut"
18. "Iconic by Mistake"
19. "Gnarly"

== Tour dates ==
List of 2026 concerts, showing date, city, country, venue, supporting act, tickets sold, number of available tickets and amount of gross revenue
Date (2026)	City	Country	Venue	Opening act	Attendance	Revenue
September 1	Dublin	Ireland	3Arena	—N/a	144,000	$15,800,000
September 3	London	England	The O_{2} Arena	—N/a	144,000	$15,800,000
September 4	London	England	The O_{2} Arena	—N/a	144,000	$15,800,000
September 6	Manchester	England	Co-op Live	—N/a	144,000	$15,800,000
September 9	Paris	France	Accor Arena	Filiz	144,000	$15,800,000
September 11	Amsterdam	Netherlands	Ziggo Dome	—N/a	144,000	$15,800,000
September 13	Cologne	Germany	Lanxess Arena	—N/a	144,000	$15,800,000
September 15	Antwerp	Belgium	AFAS Dome	—N/a	144,000	$15,800,000
September 17	Copenhagen	Denmark	Royal Arena	—N/a	144,000	$15,800,000
October 13	Miami	United States	Kaseya Center	—N/a	—	—
October 15	Atlanta	United States	State Farm Arena	—N/a	—	—
October 20	Charlotte	United States	Spectrum Center	—N/a	—	—
October 22	Washington, D.C.	United States	Capital One Arena	—N/a	—	—
October 24	Elmont (Note: Labeled as Belmont Park in promotion material)	United States	UBS Arena	—N/a	—	—
October 25	Elmont	United States	UBS Arena	—N/a	—	—
October 28	Boston	United States	TD Garden	—N/a	—	—
October 30	Montreal	Canada	Bell Centre	—N/a	—	—
November 1	Hamilton	Canada	TD Coliseum	—N/a	—	—
November 10	Austin	United States	Moody Center	—N/a	—	—
November 11	Dallas	United States	American Airlines Center	—N/a	—	—
November 14	Paradise (Note: Labeled as Las Vegas in promotion material)	United States	MGM Grand Garden Arena	—N/a	—	—
November 17	Seattle	United States	Climate Pledge Arena	—N/a	—	—
November 19	Oakland	United States	Oakland Arena	—N/a	—	—
November 21	Los Angeles	United States	Crypto.com Arena	—N/a	—	—
November 22	Los Angeles	United States	Crypto.com Arena	—N/a	—	—
November 24	Phoenix	United States	Mortgage Matchup Center	—N/a	—	—
November 27	Mexico City	Mexico	Palacio de los Deportes	—N/a	—	—
November 28	Mexico City	Mexico	Palacio de los Deportes	—N/a	—	—

List of 2027 concerts, showing date, city, country, venue, supporting act, tickets sold, number of available tickets and amount of gross revenue
Date (2027)	City	Country	Venue	Opening act	Attendance	Revenue
January 27	Yokohama	Japan	Yokohama Arena	—N/a	—	—
January 29	Pasay (Note: Labeled as Manila in promotion material)	Philippines	SM Mall of Asia Arena	—N/a	—	—
January 30	Pasay	Philippines	SM Mall of Asia Arena	—N/a	—	—
February 1	Hong Kong		AsiaWorld–Arena	—N/a	—	—
February 4	Seoul	South Korea	KSPO Dome	—N/a	—	—
February 7	Cebu City	Philippines	SM Seaside Cebu Arena	—N/a	—	—
February 10	Singapore		Singapore Indoor Stadium	—N/a	—	—
February 12	Pak Kret (Note: Labeled as Bangkok in promotion material)	Thailand	Impact Arena	—N/a	—	—
February 14	Taoyuan (Note: Labeled as Taipei in promotion material)	Taiwan	Messe Taoyuan	—N/a	—	—
February 23	Melbourne	Australia	Rod Laver Arena	—N/a	—	—
February 24	Melbourne	Australia	Rod Laver Arena	—N/a	—	—
February 25	Melbourne	Australia	Rod Laver Arena	—N/a	—	—
February 28	Sydney	Australia	Afterpay Arena	—N/a	—	—
March 1	Sydney	Australia	Afterpay Arena	—N/a	—	—
March 5	Auckland	New Zealand	Spark Arena	—N/a	—	—
March 6	Auckland	New Zealand	Spark Arena	—N/a	—	—
Total					—	—

=== Postponed concerts ===
List of postponed concerts
Date	City	Country	Venue	Reason	Ref.
November 3	Detroit	United States	Little Caesars Arena	Injury	
November 5	Chicago	United States	United Center	Injury	
November 7	Minneapolis	United States	Target Center	Injury	
