= Beautiful Chaos Tour =

2025 concert tour by Katseye

- Tour by Katseye
- Promotional poster
- Location: North America
- Associated album: Beautiful Chaos
- Start date: November 15, 2025
- End date: December 16, 2025
- Legs: 1
- No. of shows: 16

Katseye concert chronology
- Beautiful Chaos Tour (2025); The Wildworld Tour (2026–2027)

The Beautiful Chaos Tour was the debut concert tour by girl group Katseye, held in support of their second extended play (EP), Beautiful Chaos (2025). The tour commenced on November 15, 2025, in Minneapolis, Minnesota, and concluded on December 16, 2025, in Mexico City, Mexico, spanning 16 shows across North America.

== Background ==
On July 8, 2025, Katseye announced that they would embark on their first concert tour, the Beautiful Chaos Tour, spanning thirteen shows across North America. The pre-sale and general sale dates were announced concurrently. Pre-sales started on July 9, while general sales began on July 11, 2025. Following tickets selling out during pre-sale, additional shows were added in New York, San Francisco and Los Angeles, bringing the total number of shows to 16.

== Reception ==
The Beautiful Chaos Tour received generally positive reviews. Emma Vasa of the Minnesota Daily praised the group's energy at the Minneapolis show, writing that they delivered "expertly choreographed and executed dances with clear, live vocals". Hannah Sung of the Toronto Star rated the Toronto show 3.5 stars out of 4, highlighting the group's performances and their connections with their fans. Melanie Love Salazar, covering the Dallas show for The Dallas Observer, commended the group's choreography and live vocals, and said that "the girls ace a bold, risky concept, and their devotees want more of it". Angel Escobar of Melodic Magazine called the Atlanta show "less like a concert and more like witnessing the rise of the next major pop act". Escobar also noted a moment in which the members paused the performance to direct aid to dehydrated fans, saying that their "genuine concern spoke volumes about who they are beyond performers".

The San Francisco stop was affected by numerous technical issues, including problems with the members' outfits and audio systems, and an "unexplained pause" that halted the show for several minutes. However, critics including Joshua Bote of Gazetteer SF and Todd Inoue of the San Francisco Chronicle overall called the show a success, commending the group for their performances and their effective handling of the situation.

== Accolades ==
Awards and nominations for The Beautiful Chaos Tour
Organisation	Year	Category	Nominee	Result	Ref.
iHeartRadio Music Awards	2026	Favorite Tour Style	The Beautiful Chaos Tour	Nominated	
iHeartRadio Music Awards	2026	Favorite Tour Tradition	"Gnarly" dance break	Nominated	
iHeartRadio Music Awards	2026	Favorite Tour Photographer	Rahul Bhatt	Won	

== Setlist ==
This setlist is from the November 15, 2025, concert in Minneapolis.

Act I

1. "Debut"
2. "Gameboy"
3. "I'm Pretty"
4. "Mean Girls"
5. "Tonight I Might"
6. "Internet Girl"
7. "Milkshake" (dance cover)
8. "Gabriela"

Act II

9. "Girls Don't Like" (from Dream Academy)
10. "Dirty Water" (from Dream Academy)
11. "All The Same" (from Dream Academy)
12. "Time Lapse" (from the soundtrack of Good Boy)
13. "Flame" (from the soundtrack of Jentry Chau vs. the Underworld)
14. "Monster High Fright Song"
15. "M.I.A"
16. "Gnarly"

Encore

17. "Touch"
18. "My Way"

== Tour dates ==
List of 2025 concerts, showing date, city, country and venue
Date (2025)	City	Country	Venue
November 15	Minneapolis	United States	Minneapolis Armory
November 18	Toronto	Canada	The Theatre at Great Canadian Toronto
November 19	Boston	United States	MGM Music Hall at Fenway
November 21	New York City	United States	Hammerstein Ballroom
November 22	New York City	United States	The Theater at Madison Square Garden
November 24	Washington, D.C.	United States	The Anthem
November 26	Cumberland (Note: Labeled as Atlanta in promotion material.)	United States	Coca-Cola Roxy
November 29	Sugar Land	United States	Smart Financial Centre
November 30	Irving	United States	The Pavilion at Toyota Music Factory
December 3	Phoenix	United States	Arizona Financial Theatre
December 5	San Francisco	United States	The Theatre at Bill Graham Civic Auditorium
December 6	San Francisco	United States	The Theatre at Bill Graham Civic Auditorium
December 9	Seattle	United States	WaMu Theater
December 12	Inglewood (Note: Labeled as Los Angeles in promotion material.)	United States	YouTube Theater
December 13	Los Angeles	United States	Hollywood Palladium
December 16	Mexico City	Mexico	Teatro Metropólitan
