= Game Boy (disambiguation) =

The Game Boy is a handheld game console developed by Nintendo.

Game Boy or Gameboy may also refer to:

- The Game Boy family of handheld video game consoles
- "Gameboy" (song), by Katseye
- "Gameboy" by Rosé from Rosie (2024)

== See also ==
- Gameboys, a Philippine web series
- "Game Boys", an episode of The Loud House
- "Gam3 Bo1" by Seventeen from Your Choice (2020)
