= Animal (Katseye song) =

2026 single by Katseye

Single by Katseye

from the EP Wild
- Released: July 24, 2026
- Genre: Pop
- Length: 2:38
- Label: Hybe UMG; Geffen
- Songwriters: Omer Fedi; Blake Slatkin; Ed Sheeran; Johnny McDaid
- Producers: Omer Fedi; Blake Slatkin

Katseye singles chronology
"Iconic by Mistake" (2026)	"Animal" (2026)	"Hootie Frutti" (2026)

Music video
- "Animal" on YouTube

"Animal" is a song by girl group Katseye. It was released on July 24, 2026 by Hybe UMG and Geffen Records as the second single from their third EP Wild (2026). It was produced by Omer Fedi and Blake Slatkin, both of whom wrote the song with Ed Sheeran and Johnny McDaid. It reached number one in Australia and the top ten in Singapore, Flanders, New Zealand, the Philippines, and on the Billboard Global 200.

== Background ==
On July 20, 2026, Katseye announced that they would release "Animal", the second single for their third EP, Wild, on July 24. The announcement was accompanied by a teaser depicting the members wearing suits in an office building, with the word "freaky" written on member Megan Skiendiel's red nails. They hosted an official countdown event on YouTube, just moments shortly before its premiere.

On July 28, Ed Sheeran revealed that he first reached out to Katseye after listening to "Gnarly" during the previous year, noting that he was a fan and expressed interest on collaborating with the group. He then shared a behind-the-scenes clip on social media showing the song's creation process. Skiendiel also mentioned that they first heard about the song when they met Sheeran at the 2025 NRJ Music Awards, stating they were "fully in" and describing the experience of working together as "so great and we couldn't be happier with how it turned out."

== Composition ==
The song has been commonly described as a pop song, influenced by "throwback R&B", with a "flirtatious" theme. Lyrically, it explores the contrast between one's professional persona in public, and their uninhibited nature literally behind closed doors. The production also includes plucky acoustic guitars.

== Critical reception ==
Katseye performing the song in 2026 at the Climate Pledge Arena

Euphoria Magazine regarded the song as suitable for "car radio as easily as a festival stage" without compromising the "vocal chemistry" of Katseye and also praised its emotional impact, noting that although the song uses a common theme, the group "sells it through sheer vocal conviction rather than lyrical originality". Larisha Paul of Rolling Stone considered it one of the group's best songs, describing it as "catchy and spirited enough to not come across as predictable", and attributed the song's quality to Ed Sheeran's songwriting. Nylon named "Animal" one of the best songs released that week, with Jillian Giandurco writing that the track "feels like a return to form for Katseye: no gimmicks, no rage bait, just a straightforward, solid pop song." Alex Harris of Neon Music called it "their strongest pop single yet", drawing comparisons to "Toxic" by Britney Spears and their previous single "Gabriela".

== Music video ==
The music video was released alongside the song. It was directed by Cody Critcheloe, who had previously worked with the group on music videos for notable hits such as "Touch", "Gnarly" and "Iconic by Mistake". The plot begins with Katseye performing before a conference room of male business executives, who are played by the members, and are initially unimpressed with their performance. After witnessing their headshots being torn apart, the group frantically searches a packed closet for the perfect outfit in a chaotic sequence, possibly in fear of rejection. Actress Demi Moore then observes them, rejects their choices and offers her own fashion advice. She tells them to "get Wild", after which the Katseye members' suits quickly transform into sparkly outfits and start dancing once more, this time to success.

== Usage in media ==
"Animal" was used in promotional material for the 2026 Marvel Studios film, Spider-Man: Brand New Day, as well as the 2026 Disney animated film, Hexed.

== Accolades ==
Awards & Nominations for "Animal"
Award ceremony	Year	Category	Result	Ref.
ARIA Number One Chart Awards	2026	Number One Single	Won	
Berlin Commercial Festival	2026	Craft: Editing	Nominated	
Berlin Commercial Festival	2026	Craft: Casting	Nominated	
Berlin Commercial Festival	2026	Craft: Costume Styling	Nominated	
BreakTudo Awards	2026	International Hit of the Year	Pending	

== Credits and personnel ==
Credits are adapted from Apple Music.

- Katseye – vocals
- Omer Fedi – songwriter, guitar, bass, keyboards, drums, background vocals, drum programming, producer, engineer
- Blake Slatkin – songwriter, keyboards, drum programming, background vocals, producer, engineer
- Ed Sheeran – songwriter, guitar, background vocals
- Johnny McDaid – songwriter
- Aaron Steele – drums
- Nick Lobel – engineer
- Bryce Bordone – engineer
- Serban Ghenea – mixing engineer
- Bart Schoudel – vocal producer, engineer
- Chris Gehringer – mastering engineer
- Will Quinnell – assistant mastering engineer
- Robby De Sá – vocal recording engineer
- John Hanes – immersive mixing engineer, immersive mastering engineer
- Yang Ga – immersive mixing engineer

== Charts ==
=== Weekly charts ===
Weekly chart performance
Chart (2026)	Peak position
Argentina Anglo Airplay (Monitor Latino)	8
Australia (ARIA)	1
Australia Airplay (RCS)	9
Austria (Ö3 Austria Top 40)	45
Austria Airplay (MusicTrace)	7
Belarus Airplay (TopHit)	12
Belgium (Ultratop 50 Flanders)	5
Belgium (Ultratop 50 Wallonia)	7
Bolivia Anglo Airplay (Monitor Latino)	2
Bulgaria Airplay (PROPHON)	2
Canada Hot 100 (Billboard)	24
Canada AC (Billboard)	24
Canada CHR/Top 40 (Billboard)	10
Canada Hot AC (Billboard)	21
Canada Rock (Billboard)	34
Central America Anglo Airplay (Monitor Latino)	11
Chile Anglo Airplay (Monitor Latino)	8
Colombia Anglo Airplay (Monitor Latino)	11
CIS Airplay (TopHit)	1
Croatia International Airplay (Top lista)	1
Czech Republic Airplay (ČNS IFPI)	4
Czech Republic Singles Digital (ČNS IFPI)	88
Denmark Airplay (Tracklisten)	3
Ecuador Anglo Airplay (Monitor Latino)	9
Estonia Airplay (TopHit)	4
Finland (Suomen virallinen lista)	29
France (SNEP)	107
France Airplay (SNEP)	4
Germany (GfK)	20
Germany Airplay (MusicTrace)	1
Global 200 (Billboard)	10
Global Dance Radio (Billboard/WARM)	71
Greece International (IFPI)	14
Guatemala Anglo Airplay (Monitor Latino)	14
Honduras Anglo Airplay (Monitor Latino)	6
Hong Kong (Billboard)	15
Hungary (Editors' Choice Top 40)	7
Ireland (IRMA)	17
Israel (Mako Hitlist)	76
Israel International Airplay (Media Forest)	1
Italy Airplay (EarOne)	11
Japan Hot Overseas (Billboard Japan)	12
Kazakhstan Airplay (TopHit)	5
Latin America Anglo Airplay (Monitor Latino)	5
Latvia Airplay (LaIPA)	5
Lithuania (AGATA)	27
Lithuania Airplay (TopHit)	1
Malaysia (IFPI)	11
Malaysia International (RIM)	6
Malta Airplay (Radiomonitor)	8
Moldova Airplay (TopHit)	11
Netherlands (Dutch Top 40)	7
Netherlands (Single Top 100)	18
New Zealand (Recorded Music NZ)	10
Nigeria (TurnTable Top 100)	61
North Macedonia Airplay (Radiomonitor)	2
Norway (VG-lista)	34
Panama Anglo Airplay (Monitor Latino)	7
Panama Streaming (PRODUCE)	111
Paraguay Anglo Airplay (Monitor Latino)	6
Peru Anglo Airplay (Monitor Latino)	3
Philippines (IFPI)	12
Philippines Hot 100 (Billboard Philippines)	9
Poland Airplay (OLiS)	64
Poland Streaming (OLiS)	57
Portugal (AFP)	37
Portugal Airplay (AFP)	26
Puerto Rico Anglo Airplay (Monitor Latino)	4
Romania (Billboard)	22
Romania Airplay (Media Forest)	8
Russia Airplay (TopHit)	4
San Marino Airplay (SMRTV Top 50)	11
Serbia Airplay (Radiomonitor)	5
Singapore (RIAS)	2
Slovakia Airplay (ČNS IFPI)	4
Slovakia Singles Digital (ČNS IFPI)	34
Slovenia Airplay (Radiomonitor)	12
Spain Airplay (Promusicae)	44
South Africa Airplay (TOSAC)	1
South Korea Download (Circle)	63
Sweden (Sverigetopplistan)	19
Sweden Airplay (Radiomonitor)	4
Switzerland (Schweizer Hitparade)	76
Switzerland Airplay (MusicTrace)	1
Taiwan (Billboard)	15
Ukraine Airplay (TopHit)	10
United Arab Emirates (IFPI)	13
UK Singles (Official Charts)	12
US Billboard Hot 100	24
US Adult Pop Airplay (Billboard)	24
US Pop Airplay (Billboard)	8
Venezuela Airplay (Record Report)	53

=== Monthly charts ===
Monthly chart performance
Chart (2026)	Peak position
Belarus Airplay (TopHit)	15
CIS Airplay (TopHit)	3
Estonia Airplay (TopHit)	5
Kazakhstan Airplay (TopHit)	74
Latvia Airplay (TopHit)	57
Lithuania Airplay (TopHit)	2
Moldova Airplay (TopHit)	18
Panama Streaming (PRODUCE)	160
Romania Airplay (TopHit)	11
Russia Airplay (TopHit)	12
Ukraine Airplay (TopHit)	18

== Certifications ==
Certifications
Region	Certification	Certified units/sales
Australia (ARIA)	Gold	35,000^{‡}
Canada (Music Canada)	Gold	40,000^{‡}
United Kingdom (BPI)	Silver	200,000^{‡}
^{‡} Sales+streaming figures based on certification alone.

== Release history ==
Release history for "Animal"
Region	Date	Format	Label	Ref.
Various	July 24, 2026	Digital download; streaming	Hybe UMG; Geffen	
United States	July 28, 2026	Contemporary hit radio	Hybe UMG; Geffen	
Italy	August 7, 2026	Radio airplay	EMI	
