= Meca, Swindon =

Coordinates: 51.5586°N 1.7803°W

Meca is a music and entertainment venue in Swindon.

== History ==
The venue originally opened as The Regent Theatre in 1929. In 1952, it was taken over by Gaumont, and renamed as the Gaumont Theatre. In 1963, it was taken over by Odeon and renamed accordingly. It then became home to Mecca Bingo until 2008, before sitting derelict for two years.

In December 2010, the venue was reopened and called the Meca (Music Entertainment Cultural Arena). The venue has since hosted many entertainment acts, as well as recreation. Music artists who have performed at Meca include Ed Sheeran, Example, Thin Lizzy, Annie Mac, Public Image Ltd, The Hoosiers, Chase & Status, Wheatus, Ocean Colour Scene, The Boomtown Rats and Buzzcocks, as well as comedians such as Jim Davidson, Roy Chubby Brown and Katie Hopkins.
