= Beautiful Chaos (EP) =

2025 Katseye release

- Standard cover

EP by Katseye
- Released: June 27, 2025
- Genre: Pop
- Length: 14:24
- Languages: English; Spanish
- Labels: Hybe UMG; Geffen
- Producers: Pink Slip; Tim Randolph; "Hitman" Bang; Slow Rabbit; Andrew Watt; John Ryan; KillaGraham; Sam Homaee; Daniel Crean; Risc

Katseye chronology
SIS (Soft Is Strong) (2024)	Beautiful Chaos (2025)	Wild (2026)

Singles from Beautiful Chaos
- 1. "Gnarly" Released: April 30, 2025; 2. "Gabriela" Released: June 20, 2025; 3. "Gameboy" Released: June 27, 2025

Beautiful Chaos is the second extended play (EP) by girl group Katseye. It was released on June 27, 2025, through Hybe UMG and Geffen Records. Its first single, "Gnarly", became the group's first entry on the Billboard Hot 100. The Latin-inspired "Gabriela" was released one week ahead of the EP's worldwide release date, and a final single, "Gameboy", was released concurrently with the EP.

Upon its release, the EP entered weekly music charts in fourteen regions, including reaching the top ten in Belgium, South Korea, and the US. The entry in the US' Billboard 200 demonstrated the group's growth since their first EP, as it marked their first entry in the top ten of the chart. To support the EP, Katseye embarked on their first concert tour, the Beautiful Chaos Tour, in November 2025. All songs from Beautiful Chaos were performed on the tour.

== Background and release ==
After their formation in 2023, Katseye released their first original music in August 2024 with the EP SIS (Soft Is Strong). The EP garnered moderate success, entering the US Billboard 200 and receiving favorable reviews from critics. In March 2025, Katseye were added to the lineups of Lollapalooza's and Wango Tango's 2025 festivals, before they had announced any new music to be released.

On April 30, Katseye released "Gnarly", as the lead single for a then-unannounced upcoming EP and their first musical release since SIS (Soft Is Strong). On May 7, the album's cover art and release date of June 27 was announced. The five-song track list was revealed on May 28. On June 20, Katseye released "Gabriela" as the second single off the EP. A highlight medley was released on June 23, revealing snippets and the production credits of the unreleased songs. The full EP was released on June 27, alongside the music video for the third single, "Gameboy".

== Music and lyrics ==
The EP is opened with "Gnarly", a hyperpop song crafted from a demo created by Alice Longyu Gao. It is followed by "Gabriela", a Latin pop song with a bridge sung in Spanish. "Gameboy" is a "saccharine" dance-pop song reminiscent of the group's 2024 single "Touch". "Mean Girls" is an emotional, melodic song, based on contemporary R&B. The members describe the album's closer, "M.I.A.", as a "banger", and is a combination of electronic and dance-pop. Following the EP's release, Cosmopolitan praised the band for "spreading queer joy" with the "Mean Girls" lyric "God bless the T girls and all the in-between girls".

== Critical reception ==
Professional ratings
Review scores
Source	Rating
AllMusic	2/5 stars
Pitchfork	5.5/10
Rolling Stone Philippines	3/5 stars

In a review for Pitchfork, Joshua Minsoo Kim gave the album 5.5 out of ten and described Beautiful Chaos as "awfully ordinary", "disappointing", and "inoffensive music for the incurious listener". Kim noted "Gnarly" as the EP's standout moment, saying that it "provides a glimpse into what Katseye could do to live up to their promise". AllMusic gave Beautiful Chaos two out of five stars and wrote that it was "anything but [beautiful], with a confusing smattering of genre and mood that doesn't quite hold together", adding that "Gnarly" and "M.I.A." were the "only interesting tracks" on the EP and that the others "could have been performed by any number of other artists".

== Track listing ==
Beautiful Chaos track listing
No.	Title	Writer(s)	Producer(s)	Length
1.	"Gnarly"	Tim Randolph; Kyle Buckley; Alice Longyu Gao; Jacob Kasher Hindlin; Madison Love	Pink Slip^{[p]}; Randolph^{[p]}; "Hitman" Bang; Slow Rabbit; Bart Schoudel^{[v]}	2:17
2.	"Gabriela"	Andrew Watt; John Ryan; Ali Tamposi; Charlotte Aitchison; Sara Schell	Watt; Ryan	3:17
3.	"Gameboy"	Graham Andrew Muron; Hindlin; Celine Polenghi; Jackson Lee Morgan	KillaGraham; Schoudel^{[v]}	3:05
4.	"Mean Girls"	Sam Homaee; Daniel Crean; Justin Tranter; Amanda "Kiddo" Ibanez	Homaee; Crean; Schoudel^{[v]}	3:36
5.	"M.I.A"	Christopher Smith; Sophia Brenan; David Alexander; Kristin Carpenter	Risc; Schoudel^{[v]}	2:09
Total length:				14:24

=== Notes ===
- ^{^[p]} signifies a primary and vocal producer
- ^{^[v]} signifies a vocal producer

== Personnel ==
Credits adapted from Tidal.

=== Katseye ===
- Daniela Avanzini – vocals
- Lara Raj – vocals
- Manon Bannerman – vocals
- Megan Skiendiel – vocals
- Sophia Laforteza – vocals
- Yoonchae Jeung – vocals

=== Additional contributors ===
- Chris Gehringer – mastering (tracks 1, 3–5)
- Alex Ghenea – mixing (1, 3–5)
- Bart Schoudel – engineering (1, 3–5), vocal engineering (2)
- Tim Randolph – bass, guitar loops (1)
- Kyle Buckley a.k.a. Pink Slip – drum programming, keyboards (1)
- Alice Longyu Gao – background vocals (1)
- Madison Love – background vocals (1)
- John Ryan – acoustic guitar, bass, drums, electric guitar, keyboards, programming (2)
- Andrew Watt – acoustic guitar, background vocals, bass, electric guitar, keyboards (2)
- Ali Tamposi – background vocals (2)
- Mike Bozzi – mastering (2)
- Serban Ghenea – mixing (2)
- David Rodriguez – engineering (2)
- Paul Lamalfa – engineering (2)
- Bryce Bordone – additional mixing (2)
- Marco Sonzini – additional engineering (2)
- Celine Polenghi – background vocals (3)
- Graham Andrew Muron a.k.a. KillaGraham – guitar, keyboards (3)
- Sam Homaee – bass, drums, percussion, strings, synthesizer (4)
- Amanda "Kiddo" Ibanez – background vocals (4)
- Daniel Crean – guitar (4)
- Christopher Smith a.k.a. Risc – background vocals (5)
- David Alexander – background vocals (5)
- Kristin Carpenter – background vocals (5)
- Sophia Brenan – background vocals (5)

== Charts ==
=== Weekly charts ===
Weekly chart performance for Beautiful Chaos
Chart (2025–2026)	Peak position
Austrian Albums (Ö3 Austria)	15
Belgian Albums (Ultratop Flanders)	5
Belgian Albums (Ultratop Wallonia)	18
Canadian Albums (Billboard)	32
Croatian International Albums (HDU)	7
Dutch Albums (Album Top 100)	34
French Albums (SNEP)	24
German Albums (Offizielle Top 100)	33
Greek Albums (IFPI)	90
Hungarian Physical Albums (MAHASZ)	10
Irish Albums (IRMA)	79
Japanese Western Albums (Oricon)	13
New Zealand Albums (RMNZ)	14
Portuguese Albums (AFP)	21
Scottish Albums (Official Charts)	85
South Korean Albums (Circle)	2
Spanish Albums (Promusicae)	52
Swedish Physical Albums (Sverigetopplistan)	6
Swiss Albums (Schweizer Hitparade)	31
UK Albums (Official Charts)	55
US Billboard 200	4

=== Monthly charts ===
Monthly chart performance for Beautiful Chaos
Chart (2025)	Position
South Korean Albums (Circle)	35

=== Year-end charts ===
Year-end chart performance for Beautiful Chaos
Chart (2025)	Position
French Albums (SNEP)	142
US Billboard 200	182

== Certifications ==
Region	Certification	Certified units/sales
France (SNEP)	Gold	50,000^{‡}
New Zealand (RMNZ)	Gold	7,500^{‡}
United Kingdom (BPI)	Gold	100,000^{‡}
^{‡} Sales+streaming figures based on certification alone.
