= Ora Arena =

- Interactive map of Ora Arena
- Address: Altıntepsi Mah. Ferhatpaşa Çiftliği Mevkii Çiftlik Caddesi. Bayrampaşa; Turkey
- Coordinates: 41.043067°N 28.886908°E
- Capacity: 6,300
- Type: Indoor event venue

Construction
- Opened: October 6, 2011

Website
- www.oraarena.com.tr

Ora Arena (Istanbul)

The Ora Arena is the first purpose-built live entertainment venue in Turkey with a full standing capacity of up to 6,300 including ten VIP boxes for twelve guests each. The indoor arena, located in Bayrampaşa, Istanbul, is the prominent part of the Ora Complex, the first mixed-use project in the country. The cost of the investment amounted to € 25 million.

Shows like Cirque du Soleil, Disney on Ice, Dino Merlin, Armin van Buuren, X Factor took stage at Ora Arena.
