= Alice Longyu Gao =

Chinese singer-songwriter

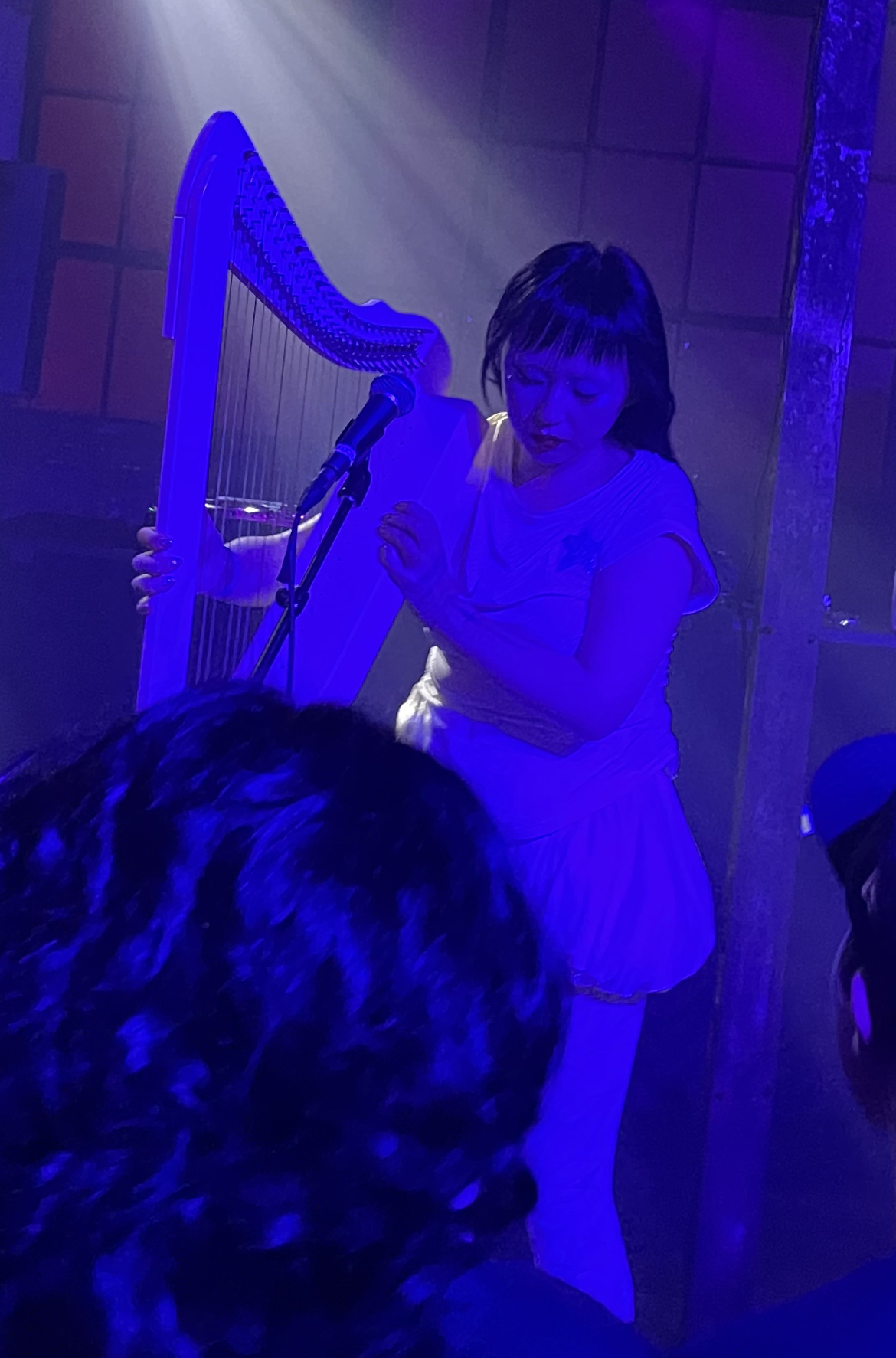
- Gao performing at Knockdown Center in New York City, New York, 2024

Background information
- Born: Bengbu, China
- Origin: New York City, New York, U.S.
- Genres: Hyperpop
- Occupations: Singer, songwriter, DJ
- Instruments: Vocals; harp; MIDI controllers
- Years active: 2018–present
- Label: Independent
- Website: alg.world

Alice Longyu Gao (Chinese: 高龙宇; pinyin: Gāo Lóngyǔ) is a Chinese singer, songwriter, DJ, and performance artist currently based in New York City and Los Angeles. Her (Note: Gao uses xe/xem/xyr neopronouns in addition to she/her and they/them. This article uses she/her pronouns for consistency.) music has been noted for its "bold hyperpop" production. Her music has been featured on BBC Radio as "Tune of the Week", and "Women of Choice" by Lady Gaga on Apple Music.

== Life and career ==
Gao was born and raised in Bengbu, China. She relocated to the United States at the age of 17 to attend Boston University for a B.S. in philosophy.

Gao started her art career by DJing events and soundtracking runway shows for brands, including Juicy Couture, Hennessy, M.A.C Cosmetics and Nike, and museums, including MoMA and Parrish Art Museum. As an editorial fashion producer and director, she produced and directed videos and shoots for publications such as V and Paper magazines. She has also produced an experiential art installation in collaboration with MOXY Time Square/Marriott International during NYFW.

Gao began releasing music independently in 2018 with early singles such as "Karma Is a Witch" and "Magnificroissant".

In 2019, as the second artist after 100 gecs to release music on Dylan Brady's label Dog Show Records, Gao released the first set of many singles in collaboration with Brady, "Rich Bitch Juice" and "Dumb Bitch Juice" "Rich Bitch Juice" received critical acclaim from musical journalists and was on Lady Gaga's "Women of Choice" Apple Music playlist celebrating International Women's Day. Following the initial hype of the single Gao and Brady released a follow-up remix compilation featuring Laura Les, Count Baldor, Blu Detiger and HANA. Since then Gao has released several solo singles as well as collaborative singles with Mura Masa, Bülow and Alice Glass.

Gao released her debut EP in 2021 titled High Dragon and Universe. This was followed by Let's Hope Heteros Fail, Learn, and Retire in 2023, the second in her trilogy. In 2024, Gao released her third EP titled Assembling Symbols Into my Own Poetry, the third and final entry in her trilogy.

Gao was credited as a writer for the 2025 song "Gnarly" by Katseye.

== Activism ==
Identifying as a pansexual queer person, Gao has participated in multiple campaigns and charity events for the LGBTQ+ community.

== Discography ==
=== Extended plays ===
Title	Details
High Dragon and Universe	Released: October 14, 2021; Label: self-released; Format: Digital download, streaming
Let's Hope Heteros Fail, Learn, and Retire	Released: March 9, 2023; Label: self-released; Format: Digital download, streaming
Assembling Symbols Into My Own Poetry	Released: October 23, 2024; Label: self-released; Format: Digital download, streaming

=== Singles ===
Title	Year	Album
"I Want My Hoe Time Back"	2018	Non-album singles
"Magnificroissant"	2018	Non-album singles
"Chew!"	2018	Non-album singles
"Karma Is a Witch"	2019	Non-album singles
"Scam"	2019	Non-album singles
"Dumb Bitch Juice"	2019	Non-album singles
"Rich Bitch Juice"	2019	Non-album singles
"Yung Piece of Shit Shut Up"	2020	Non-album singles
"U Think U Can Fuck with Me Don't Ya"	2020	Non-album singles
"Quarantine Rly Sucks"	2020	Non-album singles
"I <3 Harajuku" (featuring Fraxiom)	2020	Non-album singles
"She Abunai" (featuring Mura Masa and Bülow)	2021	Non-album singles
"Crying at CVS" (with Kilder)	2021	Non-album singles
"Legend" (featuring Alice Glass)	2021	Non-album singles
"Underrated Popstar"	2021	High Dragon and Universe
"Kanpai"	2021	High Dragon and Universe
"100 Boyfriends"	2021	High Dragon and Universe
"To My White Boy Princess......"	2022	Non-album single
"Believe the Hype" (with Oli Sykes)	2022	Let's Hope Heteros Fail, Learn, and Retire
"Make U 3 Me"	2022	Let's Hope Heteros Fail, Learn, and Retire
"Monk"	2022	Let's Hope Heteros Fail, Learn, and Retire
"Hello Kitty"	2023	Let's Hope Heteros Fail, Learn, and Retire
"Come 2 Brazil"	2023	Let's Hope Heteros Fail, Learn, and Retire
"Burn the Witch" (with Pvris and Tommy Genesis)	2024	F.I.L.T.H.
"Lesbians <3"	2024	Assembling Symbols Into My Own Poetry
"Detective Alice 神探埃粒司"	2024	Assembling Symbols Into My Own Poetry
"<3 Korean Girls" (featuring Mega Mongoliad)	2024	Assembling Symbols Into My Own Poetry
"Bird W/O Nest" (featuring Danny Brown)	2024	Assembling Symbols Into My Own Poetry
"Little Piggy"	2024	Assembling Symbols Into My Own Poetry
"Let the Music Talk"	2025	Turn Up Music Vol.1
"LSFG 2025"	2025	Turn Up Music Vol.1
