= Internet Girl (song) =

Single by Katseye
- Released: January 2, 2026
- Genre: Dance-pop
- Length: 2:43
- Label: Hybe UMG; Geffen
- Songwriters: Justin Tranter; Olivia Waithe; Mattias Larsson; Robin Fredriksson
- Producers: Mattman & Robin; Justin Tranter; Shawn Wasabi; Bart Schoudel

Katseye singles chronology
"Gameboy" (2025)	"Internet Girl" (2026)	"Pinky Up" (2026)

Music video
- "Internet Girl" on YouTube

"Internet Girl" is a song by girl group Katseye. It was released as a standalone single on January 2, 2026, through Hybe UMG and Geffen Records. The song was produced by Mattman & Robin, Justin Tranter, and Shawn Wasabi.

== Background ==
Katseye first performed "Internet Girl" on November 15, 2025, on the opening night of the Beautiful Chaos Tour. The song was performed throughout the tour. On December 29, Katseye shared a comment on the performance video saying "wait should we give you one last gift before the year ends?". Two days later, the group announced "Internet Girl" as their next single.

== Composition ==
"Internet Girl" has been described as a "raucous, rubbery dance-pop tune reminiscent of early Charli XCX". The lyrics address positive and negative aspects of celebrity and the internet, including the thrill of receiving attention and the pressures of being sexualized and judged. The chorus features the lyric "eat zucchini", which Genius noted may refer to "eggplant emojis and the body parts they represent". Lara stated that "eat zucchini" is intended to mean "eat a dick".

== Critical reception ==
Pyo Kyung-min of The Korea Times described the song as a "calculated" attempt to chase controversy. Pyo contrasts the release of the song with that of the group's 2025 single "Gnarly", which was also experimental but is now considered an "artistic gamble", he opines that "the song struggles to make a meaningful statement and instead it ends up embodying the very chaos it aims to critique."

== Commercial performance ==
"Internet Girl" reached number 24 on the UK singles chart, making it their highest-charting song on the charts. In the United States, the song debuted and peaked at number 29 on the Billboard Hot 100, becoming the group's highest debuting and second highest-peaking song on the chart at the time.

== Live performances ==
Katseye first performed "Internet Girl" as a surprise addition to the setlist of their Beautiful Chaos Tour, which opened on November 15, 2025, at The Armory in Minneapolis. It was performed during the first act of the show, incorporating Y2K-inspired digital graphics on the venue's LED screens, mimicking computer pop-up windows and social media interfaces that framed live shots of the members.

== Track listing ==
- Streaming/digital download
1. "Internet Girl" – 2:43
2. "Gabriela" – 3:17

== Charts ==
=== Weekly charts ===
Weekly chart performance
Chart (2026)	Peak position
Australia (ARIA)	45
Canada Hot 100 (Billboard)	32
Estonia Airplay (TopHit)	85
Global 200 (Billboard)	32
Greece International (IFPI)	38
Guatemala Anglo Airplay (Monitor Latino)	10
Japan Hot Overseas (Billboard Japan)	8
Lithuania Airplay (TopHit)	23
Netherlands (Single Top 100)	72
Netherlands (Global Top 40)	22
New Zealand (Recorded Music NZ)	34
Nicaragua Anglo Airplay (Monitor Latino)	7
Panama Anglo Airplay (Monitor Latino)	7
Peru Anglo Airplay (Monitor Latino)	11
Philippines Hot 100 (Billboard Philippines)	37
Portugal (AFP)	130
Singapore (RIAS)	19
South Korea Download (Circle)	167
Sweden (Sverigetopplistan)	92
UK Singles (Official Charts)	24
US Billboard Hot 100	29
Venezuela Anglo Airplay (Monitor Latino)	6

=== Monthly charts ===
Monthly chart performance
Chart (2026)	Peak position
Estonia Airplay (TopHit)	94
Panama Streaming (PRODUCE)	823

== Certifications ==
Certifications for "Internet Girl"
Region	Certification	Certified units/sales
Brazil (Pro-Música Brasil)	Platinum	40,000^{‡}
^{‡} Sales+streaming figures based on certification alone.
