= Gameboy (song) =

2025 single by Katseye

Single by Katseye

from the EP Beautiful Chaos
- Released: June 27, 2025
- Genre: Pop
- Length: 3:05
- Label: Hybe UMG; Geffen
- Songwriters: Graham Andrew Muron; Jacob Kasher Hindlin; Celine Polenghi; Jackson Lee Morgan
- Producers: KillaGraham; Bart Schoudel

Katseye singles chronology
"Gabriela" (2025)	"Gameboy" (2025)	"Internet Girl" (2026)

Music video
- "Gameboy" on YouTube

"Gameboy" is a song by girl group Katseye, released on June 27, 2025, as the third single from their second EP Beautiful Chaos, which was released on the same day. It was produced by KillaGraham, with vocal production from Bart Schoudel.

== Composition ==
The song contains electronic, video game-inspired sound effects, including those of 8-bits. Lyrically, it concerns a partner's unserious attitude in a romantic relationship: "You're just a game boy / I ain't trying to play, boy / I ain't thinkin' about you".

== Critical reception ==
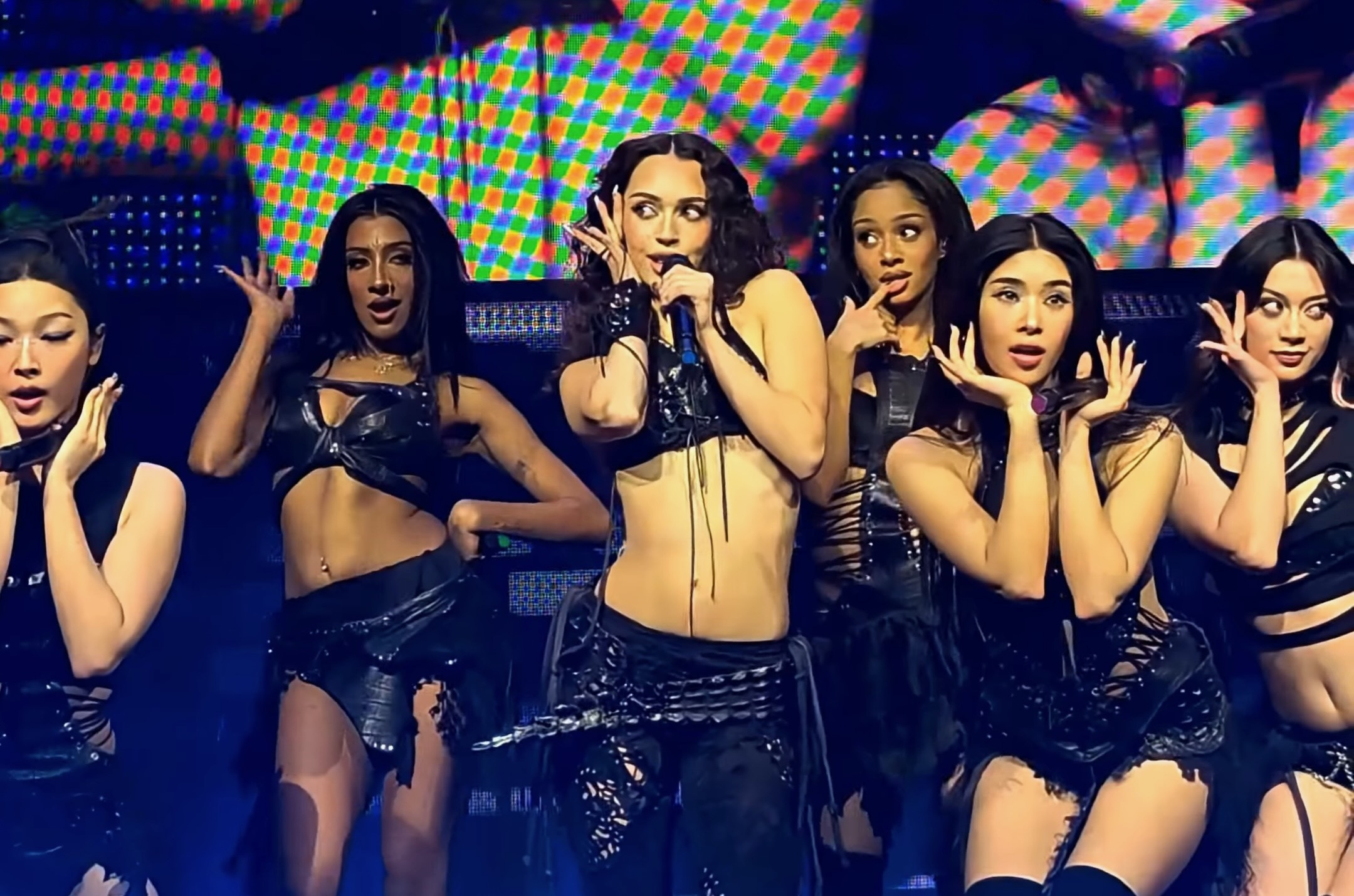
Katseye performing "Gameboy" in December 2025

The song received generally positive reviews. In his review of Beautiful Chaos for Pitchfork, Joshua Minsoo Kim was somewhat critical but still considered it better than the other tracks: "Their last EP's best song was the perfectly fine 'Touch,' an A-pop take on K-pop's 'hook song' formula. The closest analogue here is the blippy 'Gameboy,' but without the ultra-repetitive chorus, it sounds like little more than an Ariana Grande reject." Taylor Swinton of Melodic commented the song "showcases the group's unapologetic, charismatic attitude with a hint of sass." Adrian Jade Francisco of Rolling Stone Philippines wrote "The reward comes from 'Gameboy,' which compensates for what the rest of the EP fails to do. It maintains the most consistent structure in Beautiful Chaos, kicking the door open from verse to chorus with 8-bit sound effects and hooks that remain stuck in your ear. 'Gameboy' isn't playing to lose. Far from a 'game over,' it makes the most of its three minutes, delivering a surge instead of just teasing to justify its place in the five-track EP."

== Charts ==
=== Weekly charts ===
Chart performance for "Gameboy"
Chart (2025–2026)	Peak position
Canada Hot 100 (Billboard)	90
Chile Anglo Airplay (Monitor Latino)	14
Dominican Republic Anglo Airplay (Monitor Latino)	15
Global 200 (Billboard)	131
New Zealand Hot Singles (RMNZ)	12
Philippines Hot 100 (Billboard Philippines)	42
Singapore (RIAS)	27
South Korea Download (Circle)	180
US Bubbling Under Hot 100 Singles (Billboard)	9

== Certifications ==
Region	Certification	Certified units/sales
Brazil (Pro-Música Brasil)	2× Platinum	80,000^{‡}
New Zealand (RMNZ)	Gold	15,000^{‡}
United Kingdom (BPI)	Silver	200,000^{‡}
^{‡} Sales+streaming figures based on certification alone.
