= Gnarly (song) =

Single by Katseye

from the EP Beautiful Chaos
- Released: April 30, 2025
- Genre: Hyperpop; experimental pop
- Length: 2:19
- Label: HYBE UMG; Geffen
- Composers: Tim Randolph; Kyle Buckley
- Lyricists: Alice Longyu Gao; Jacob Kasher Hindlin; Madison Love
- Producers: Pink Slip; "Hitman" Bang; Slow Rabbit

Katseye singles chronology
"Touch" (2024)	"Gnarly" (2025)	"Gabriela" (2025)

Ice Spice singles chronology
"Hannah Montana" (2025)	"Gnarly" (remix) (2025)	"Gyatt" (2025)

Lancey Foux singles chronology
"Dance On Me" (2025)	"Gnarly" (remix) (2025)	"Needy" (2025)

Music video
- "Gnarly" on YouTube

"Gnarly" is a song by girl group Katseye. It was released on April 30, 2025, through Hybe UMG and Geffen Records, as the lead single for their second extended play Beautiful Chaos (2025). Described as a hyperpop song, "Gnarly" was written by Alice Longyu Gao, Tim Randolph, Kyle Buckley, Jacob Kasher Hindlin and Madison Love, with production by Buckley, "Hitman" Bang and Slow Rabbit.

Despite initially receiving a polarizing response from fans, the song reached the top ten in Singapore and Malaysia. It also became the group’s first entry on both the Billboard Hot 100 and the UK singles chart.

== Background and release ==
In March 2025, Katseye were added to the lineups of Lollapalooza's and Wango Tango's 2025 festivals. On April 23, Hybe X Geffen announced that the group would be releasing their first digital single, titled "Gnarly". A teaser was released on April 29. The song and its music video, directed by Cody Critcheloe, were released April 30.

== Composition and lyrics ==
"Gnarly" was written by Alice Longyu Gao, Tim Randolph, Kyle Buckley, Jacob Kasher Hindlin, and Madison Love. It was produced by Buckley, "Hitman" Bang and Slow Rabbit. The song has been described to be an experimental pop and hyperpop track characterized by "quaking 808s, gritty rave synths and a pugnacious attitude". It was written in the key of C minor with a tempo of 135 beats per minute.

Performed by its songwriter Alice Longyu Gao, a pioneer of the hyperpop genre, an early demo of "Gnarly" was first publicly shared by Andrew Taggart on TikTok in April 2023. Gao stated that her inspiration for the song originated from her "gnarly" experiences with boba tea and fried chicken, among other interests. The song's prominent use of "gnarly" stems from Gao's background as a non-native English speaker who was "always on the lookout to expand her vocabulary". Upon first hearing the word, Gao admitted that she had initially not known its meaning but was "amused and surprised by the excessive usage of this word by some basic bros".

Lyrically, the song gravitates around the word "gnarly", which is defined by its ability to express "different meanings and connotations depending on what cultural or life context you're in", as indicated in the track's opening line: "They could describe everything with one single word." Explaining the meaning of the term, Katseye member Manon stated, "Gnarly can be a good thing or a bad thing in our minds. It's kind of up for interpretation."

== Critical reception ==
"Gnarly" received polarizing responses, having been described as a "sharp turn" from Katseye's previous releases. In an interview with The Fader, Lara described "Gnarly" as unstructured, and acknowledged that it was a change of sound after "Touch". Tetris Kelly reviewed the song for Billboard's Music You Should Know, describing it as "if you get it, you get it".

NME's Rhian Daly contributed "Gnarly" to the magazine's Songs of the Summer list. Pitchfork's Joshua Minsoo Kim described the song as "the most interesting of their career", comparing it to the work of Sophie and writing that it "provides a glimpse into what Katseye could do to live up to their promise as a global girl group."

"Gnarly" appeared at number five on NME's list of 'The 50 Best Songs of 2025' list as well as on The New York Times 'Best Songs of 2025' list at number two.

=== Accolades ===
Awards and nominations for "Gnarly"
Organization	Date	Category	Result	Ref.
American Music Awards	May 25, 2026	Best Music Video	Won	
Berlin Music Video Awards	June 13, 2026	Best Art Direction	Nominated	
Clio Awards	2026	Editing	Silver	
Hollywood Music Video Awards	2026	Best Choreography	Nominated	
iHeartRadio Music Awards	March 26, 2026	Favorite TikTok Dance	Nominated	

== Live performances ==
The choreography for "Gnarly" was arranged by Katseye's performance directors, Sohey Sugihara and Grant Gilmore. Katseye first performed "Gnarly" on the May 1 broadcast of M Countdown. They then performed on Music Bank on May 2, Show! Music Core on May 3, and Inkigayo on May 4. While promoting in South Korea, the group also performed "Gnarly" on Studio Choom.

Katseye's first North American performance of the song was during their set at Wango Tango 2025. On June 21, they performed the clean version of "Gnarly" at the 2025 Kids' Choice Awards. They also performed the song at the 2025 MTV Video Music Awards pre-show on September 7. At the 68th Annual Grammy Awards, Katseye performed the song along with a dance break that was included in the Best New Artist medley, which also marked the group's last television performance before Manon's hiatus.

== Credits and personnel ==
Adapted from Melon.

Location

- Mixed at MixStar Studios, Virginia Beach, VA
- Mastered at Sterling Sound

Credits and personnel

- Katseye – vocals
- Tim Randolph – writer, producer, bass, guitar synthesizer, vocal producer
- Pink Slip – writer, producer, drum programming, keyboards, vocal producer
- Alice Longyu Gao – writer, background vocals
- Jacob Kasher Hindlin – writer
- Madison Love – writer, background vocals
- "Hitman" Bang – producer
- Slow Rabbit – producer
- Bart Schoudel – vocal producer, recording
- Alex Ghenea – mixing
- Chris Gehringer – mastering

== Charts ==
=== Weekly charts ===
Weekly chart performance for "Gnarly"
Chart (2025–2026)	Peak position
Australia (ARIA)	76
Canada Hot 100 (Billboard)	69
El Salvador Anglo Airplay (Monitor Latino)	2
Global 200 (Billboard)	41
Greece International (IFPI)	86
Ireland (IRMA)	73
Japan Hot Overseas (Billboard Japan)	6
Malaysia (Billboard)	18
Malaysia International (RIM)	9
New Zealand Hot Singles (RMNZ)	2
Philippines Hot 100 (Billboard Philippines)	23
Portugal (AFP)	160
Singapore (RIAS)	7
South Korea (Circle)	104
UK Singles (Official Charts)	52
US Billboard Hot 100	82

Weekly chart performance for "Gnarly" (Ice Spice remix)
Chart (2025)	Peak position
New Zealand Hot Singles (RMNZ)	39

=== Monthly charts ===
Monthly chart performance for "Gnarly"
Chart (2025)	Peak position
South Korea (Circle)	120

=== Year-end charts ===
Year-end chart performance for "Gnarly"
Chart (2025)	Position
Global 200 (Billboard)	161
Philippines (Philippines Hot 100)	71

== Certifications ==
Certifications for "Gnarly"
Region	Certification	Certified units/sales
Australia (ARIA)	Platinum	70,000^{‡}
Belgium (BRMA)	Gold	20,000^{‡}
Brazil (Pro-Música Brasil)	2× Diamond	320,000^{‡}
Canada (Music Canada)	Platinum	80,000^{‡}
France (SNEP)	Gold	100,000^{‡}
New Zealand (RMNZ)	Platinum	30,000^{‡}
Poland (ZPAV)	Gold	62,500^{‡}
United Kingdom (BPI)	Gold	400,000^{‡}
^{‡} Sales+streaming figures based on certification alone.

== Release history ==
Release history for "Gnarly"
Region	Date	Format	Version	Label	Ref.
Various	April 30, 2025	Digital download; streaming	Explicit	Hybe UMG; Geffen	
Various	April 30, 2025	Digital download; streaming	Clean	Hybe UMG; Geffen	
Various	June 6, 2025	Digital download; streaming	Ice Spice remix	Hybe UMG; Geffen	
Various	June 6, 2025	Digital download; streaming	Lara x Lancey Foux x Slush Puppy remix	Hybe UMG; Geffen	
Various	September 5, 2025	Digital download; streaming	Extended version	Hybe UMG; Geffen	
