= Gabriela (song) =

Single by Katseye

from the EP Beautiful Chaos
- Language: English; Spanish
- Released: June 20, 2025
- Genre: Pop; Latin pop; R&B
- Length: 3:17
- Label: Hybe UMG; Geffen
- Composers: Andrew Watt; John Ryan
- Lyricists: Ali Tamposi; Charlotte Aitchison; Sara Schell
- Producers: Andrew Watt; John Ryan

Katseye singles chronology
"Gnarly" (2025)	"Gabriela" (2025)	"Gameboy" (2025)

Young Miko singles chronology
"Jetski" (2025)	"Gabriela" (remix) (2025)

Music video
- "Gabriela" on YouTube

"Gabriela" is a song by the girl group Katseye. It was released on June 20, 2025, through Hybe UMG and Geffen Records, as the second single from their second extended play Beautiful Chaos (2025). It reached number one in Wallonia and the top ten on multiple other national singles charts, as well as number 16 on the Billboard Global 200. The single also peaked at number 21 on the Billboard Hot 100, earning the group their highest positioning on the chart and first Top 40 placement after "Gnarly". It is certified Diamond in France and Gold in eleven additional countries. It has one billion streams on Spotify, making it the group's most-streamed song on the platform. "Gabriela" earned a nomination for Best Pop Duo/Group Performance at the 68th Annual Grammy Awards.

A remix of the song, featuring new verses by the Puerto Rican rapper Young Miko, was released in August 2025.

== Background and release ==
Following the success of "Gnarly", the group's first entry on the Billboard Hot 100, Katseye announced their second EP, Beautiful Chaos on May 7, 2025. The track list for the EP was released at the end of May, including "Gabriela" as one of its five tracks. On June 16, Katseye released teasers for "Gabriela" and its music video, confirming it would be the second single from Beautiful Chaos. "Gabriela" was released to streaming services on June 20, alongside its music video. The song was previously offered to Anitta and Rita Ora (as a collaboration with Rich the Kid), who both recorded versions in 2018. Perrie Edwards also revealed that Little Mix recorded a version of the song, but due to Jesy Nelson not wanting the group to release it, they passed on it.

== Composition and lyrics ==
The lyrics for "Gabriela" were written by Andrew Watt, John Ryan, Ali Tamposi, Charli XCX, and Sara Schell, with Watt and Ryan also producing the song. Described as a Latin-inspired R&B pop song, the track includes a Spanish verse sung by Daniela in falsetto. Lyrically, it explores the feelings of losing a lover to someone else; it has been described by multiple critics as a modern-day or Gen-Z "Jolene". "Gabriela" was written in the key of A minor and has a bpm of 73 (or 146 in double time).

== Reception ==
"Gabriela" was voted by Billboard readers as the best new song of the week on June 22. The Billboard editorial staff named it the thirty-second best song of 2025, with Amanda Retotar describing it as a "fresh, modern, Latin-inspired "Jolene"" that "hits the sweet spot of being both catchy and plucking all the right emotional strings," calling the vocal cohesion as a group "impressive" and with the falsetto Spanish bridge solidifying the group as a "diverse new powerhouse." Rolling Stone ranked it at sixty-two on their year-end best songs of the year list.

=== Accolades ===
Awards and nominations for "Gabriela"
Organisation	Date of ceremony	Category	Result	Ref.
BreakTudo Awards	November 18, 2025	International Hit of the Year	Nominated	
Clio Awards	2026	Editing	Nominated	
Grammy Awards	February 1, 2026	Best Pop Duo/Group Performance	Nominated	
Grindr Unwrapped Awards	2025	Music Video of the Year	Nominated	
iHeartRadio Music Awards	March 26, 2026	Best Music Video	Nominated	
Premios Juventud	September 3, 2026	Girl Power (Young Miko Remix)	Nominated	
SEC Awards (Note: The SEC Awards, formerly known as the Séries em Cena Awards, is a Brazilian award show that honors achievements in music, film, television, and internet culture in Brazil and globally.)	2026	International Song of the Year	Nominated	

== Music video ==
A music video directed by Andrew Thomas Huang was released the same day as the single. Two teasers were released, on June 17 and 18. The video features the six members with voluminous, "retro" hairstyles in a telenovela-inspired setting, and includes an appearance by American actress Jessica Alba. Alba opens the video, acting as the CEO of "Gabriela Enterprises" who is stepping down and determining her replacement out of the six Katseye members. The members fight each other physically, sabotage a wedding, and appear on a fictional talk show, with its host played by model Soo Joo Park in a cameo appearance.

== Usage in media ==
"Gabriela" was featured on the in-game radio station Flash FM in the 2026 Rockstar Games video game, Grand Theft Auto VI.

== Credits and personnel ==
Adapted from Melon.

Location

- Mixed at MixStar Studios, Virginia Beach

Credits and personnel

- Katseye – vocals
- Andrew Watt – producer, writer, bass, acoustic guitar, electric guitar, keyboards, background vocals
- John Ryan – producer, writer, bass, acoustic guitar, electric guitar, keyboards, drums, programming
- Ali Tamposi – writer, background vocals
- Charlotte Aitchison – writer
- Sara Schell – writer
- Bart Schoudel – vocal engineering
- Paul LaMalfa – engineering
- David Rodriguez – engineering
- Marco Sonzini – additional engineering
- Serban Ghenea – mixing
- Bryce Bordone – mixing assistance
- Mike Bozzi – mastering

== Charts ==
=== Weekly charts ===
Weekly chart performance for "Gabriela"
Chart (2025–2026)	Peak position
Argentina Anglo Airplay (Monitor Latino)	14
Australia (ARIA)	27
Belarus Airplay (TopHit)	22
Belgium (Ultratop 50 Flanders)	29
Belgium (Ultratop 50 Wallonia)	1
Bolivia Anglo Airplay (Monitor Latino)	12
Brazil Hot 100 (Billboard)	98
Bulgaria Airplay (PROPHON)	2
Canada Hot 100 (Billboard)	20
Canada CHR/Top 40 (Billboard)	16
Canada Hot AC (Billboard)	32
Central America Anglo Airplay (Monitor Latino)	9
Chile Airplay (Monitor Latino)	17
Colombia Anglo Airplay (Monitor Latino)	13
CIS Airplay (TopHit)	2
Costa Rica Anglo Airplay (Monitor Latino)	7
Croatia International Airplay (Top lista)	15
Denmark Airplay (Tracklisten)	2
Dominican Republic Anglo Airplay (Monitor Latino)	10
Ecuador Anglo Airplay (Monitor Latino)	5
El Salvador Anglo Airplay (Monitor Latino)	2
Estonia Airplay (TopHit)	3
Finland Airplay (Radiosoittolista)	13
France (SNEP)	16
Germany Airplay (BVMI)	10
Global 200 (Billboard)	16
Greece International (IFPI)	17
Greece Airplay (IFPI)	8
India International (IMI)	17
Ireland (IRMA)	45
Israel International Airplay (Media Forest)	3
Italy Airplay (EarOne)	97
Kazakhstan Airplay (TopHit)	2
Latin America Anglo Airplay (Monitor Latino)	10
Lithuania (AGATA)	55
Lithuania Airplay (TopHit)	3
Malaysia (IFPI)	5
Malaysia International (RIM)	2
Mexico Anglo Airplay (Monitor Latino)	10
Moldova Airplay (TopHit)	36
Netherlands (Dutch Top 40)	12
Netherlands (Single Top 100)	30
New Zealand (Recorded Music NZ)	26
Nigeria Bubbling Under Hot 100 (TurnTable)	1
Nigeria International (TurnTable)	24
North Macedonia Airplay (Radiomonitor)	8
Norway (VG-lista)	97
Panama Anglo Airplay (Monitor Latino)	6
Paraguay Airplay (Monitor Latino)	11
Peru Anglo Airplay (Monitor Latino)	10
Philippines Hot 100 (Billboard Philippines)	5
Poland Airplay (OLiS)	8
Poland Streaming (OLiS)	87
Portugal (AFP)	61
Puerto Rico Anglo Airplay (Monitor Latino)	2
Romania Airplay (UPFR)	8
Romania Airplay (Media Forest)	6
Romania TV Airplay (Media Forest)	16
Russia Airplay (TopHit)	2
Serbia Airplay (Radiomonitor)	3
Singapore (RIAS)	5
Slovakia Airplay (ČNS IFPI)	28
Slovakia Singles Digital (ČNS IFPI)	97
Slovenia Airplay (Radiomonitor)	8
South Korea Download (Circle)	126
Suriname (Nationale Top 40)	23
Sweden (Sverigetopplistan)	94
Switzerland (Schweizer Hitparade)	46
Turkey International Airplay (Radiomonitor Türkiye)	1
Ukraine Airplay (TopHit)	92
United Arab Emirates (IFPI)	15
UK Singles (Official Charts)	38
Uruguay Anglo Airplay (Monitor Latino)	11
US Billboard Hot 100	21
US Adult Contemporary (Billboard)	22
US Adult Pop Airplay (Billboard)	29
US Dance Airplay (Billboard)	38
US Pop Airplay (Billboard)	9
Venezuela Anglo Airplay (Monitor Latino)	10

Weekly chart performance for "Gabriela" (Young Miko remix)
Chart (2025)	Peak position
Spain Airplay (Promusicae)	14

=== Monthly charts ===
Monthly chart performance for "Gabriela"
Chart (2025–2026)	Peak position
Belarus Airplay (TopHit)	32
CIS Airplay (TopHit)	3
Estonia Airplay (TopHit)	3
Kazakhstan Airplay (TopHit)	5
Lithuania Airplay (TopHit)	4
Moldova Airplay (TopHit)	51
Panama Streaming (PRODUCE)	239
Paraguay Airplay (SGP)	52
Romania Airplay (TopHit)	7
Russia Airplay (TopHit)	6

=== Year-end charts ===
Year-end chart performance for "Gabriela"
Chart (2025)	Position
Belgium (Ultratop 50 Flanders)	123
CIS Airplay (TopHit)	95
Estonia Airplay (TopHit)	18
Global 200 (Billboard)	163
Lithuania Airplay (TopHit)	162
Netherlands (Dutch Top 40)	97
Philippines (Philippines Hot 100)	29
Romania Airplay (TopHit)	81
Russia Airplay (TopHit)	137

== Certifications ==
Certifications for "Gabriela"
Region	Certification	Certified units/sales
Australia (ARIA)	Platinum	70,000^{‡}
Belgium (BRMA)	Platinum	40,000^{‡}
Brazil (Pro-Música Brasil)	2× Diamond	320,000^{‡}
Canada (Music Canada)	Platinum	80,000^{‡}
France (SNEP)	Diamond	333,333^{‡}
New Zealand (RMNZ)	Platinum	30,000^{‡}
Poland (ZPAV)	Platinum	125,000^{‡}
Portugal (AFP)	Platinum	25,000^{‡}
Spain (Promusicae)	Gold	50,000^{‡}
Switzerland (IFPI Switzerland)	Platinum	30,000^{‡}
United Kingdom (BPI)	Gold	400,000^{‡}
Streaming
Central America (CFC)	Gold	3,500,000^{†}
Greece (IFPI Greece)	Gold	1,000,000^{†}
^{‡} Sales+streaming figures based on certification alone.^{†} Streaming-only figures based on certification alone.

== Release history ==
Release history for "Gabriela"
Region	Date	Format	Version	Label	Ref.
Various	June 20, 2025	Digital download; streaming	Original	Hybe UMG; Geffen	
Italy	July 11, 2025	Radio airplay	Original	Universal	
United States	July 29, 2025	Contemporary hit radio	Original	Hybe UMG; Geffen	
Various	August 8, 2025	Digital download; streaming	Young Miko remix	Hybe UMG; Geffen	
Various	September 5, 2025	Digital download; streaming	Julia Lewis reggaeton remix	Hybe UMG; Geffen	
Various	September 5, 2025	Digital download; streaming	Extended version	Hybe UMG; Geffen	
Various	September 5, 2025	Digital download; streaming	Sped up version	Hybe UMG; Geffen	
