= Adéla discography =

- Adéla performing in 2026
- Studio albums: 1
- EPs: 1
- Singles: 9
- Music videos: 9

Slovak singer and songwriter Adéla has released one studio album, one extended play, and nine singles. After being eliminated from the survival reality show Dream Academy in 2023, Adéla signed with Capitol Records and released her debut extended play The Provocateur in 2025.

In 2026, Adéla released her debut studio album Prima, which debuted at fourth place on the Billboard 200. It also spawned four singles; "KGB", "Red Bottoms", "Ain't in LA" and "Nicole Kidman". "Ain't in LA" became Adéla's first entry on the Billboard Hot 100 chart, making her the first Slovak artist to have achieved so.

== Studio albums ==
Title	Details	Peak chart positions									
Title	Details	SVK	AUS	AUT	BEL (FL)	IRE	NLD	NZ	SCO	UK	US
Prima	Released: 4 September 2026; Label: Capitol; Formats: CD, LP, digital download, streaming, cassette	1	6	2	1	5	1	5	1	2	4

== Extended plays ==
Title	Details
The Provocateur	Released: 22 August 2025; Label: Capitol; Formats: CD, LP, digital download, streaming

== Singles ==
List of singles, showing year released and name of the album
Title	Year	Peak chart positions										Certifications	Album or EP
Title	Year	SVK	AUS	CAN	IRE	NZ	PHL	SGP	UK	US	WW	Certifications	Album or EP
"Homewrecked"	2024	—	—	—	—	—	—	—	—	—	—		The Provocateur
"Superscar"	2024	—	—	—	—	—	—	—	—	—	—		The Provocateur
"MachineGirl"	2025	— (Note: "MachineGirl" did not enter the Slovakia Singles Digital chart, but peaked at number 55 on the Slovakia Airplay chart.)	—	—	—	—	—	—	—	—	—		The Provocateur
"DeathByDevotion"	2025	—	—	—	—	—	—	—	—	—	—		The Provocateur
"SexOnTheBeat"	2025	— (Note: "SexOnTheBeat" did not enter the Slovakia Singles Digital chart, but peaked at number 57 on the Slovakia Airplay chart.)	—	—	—	—	—	—	—	—	—		The Provocateur
"KGB"	2026	28	—	—	—	— (Note: "KGB" did not enter the NZ Top 40 Singles Chart, but peaked at number eight on the NZ Hot Singles Chart.)	—	—	— (Note: "KGB" did not enter the UK Singles Chart, but peaked at number 59 on the UK Singles Sales Chart.)	— (Note: "KGB" did not enter the Billboard Hot 100 chart, but peaked at number nine on the US Hot Dance/Pop Songs chart.)	—		Prima
"Red Bottoms"	2026	32	—	—	—	— (Note: "Red Bottoms" did not enter the NZ Top 40 Singles Chart, but peaked at number 18 on the NZ Hot Singles Chart.)	—	—	—	—	—		Prima
"Ain't in LA"	2026	2	7	11	9	5	1	1	12	24	4	ČNS IFPI: Platinum; BPI: Silver; MC: Platinum; RMNZ: Gold	Prima
"Nicole Kidman"	2026	3	3	5	7	4	4	1	4	6	2	ČNS IFPI: Gold; BPI: Silver; MC: Platinum; RMNZ: Gold	Prima
"—" denotes a recording that did not chart or was not released in that territory.

== Other charted songs ==
List of other charted songs, showing year released and name of the album
Title	Year	Peak chart positions				Album
Title	Year	SVK	NZ Hot	US Bub.	US Dance/ Pop	Album
"I'm the Man"	2026	37	7	—	—	Prima
"Boys"	2026	24	6	24	8	Prima
"Hitachi"	2026	67	—	—	—	Prima
"Fantasize"	2026	62	—	—	—	Prima
"Starving Artist"	2026	61	—	—	—	Prima
"Marijuana"	2026	57	—	—	—	Prima
"—" denotes a recording that did not chart.

== Music videos ==
Title	Year	Director(s)	Ref.
"Homewrecked"	2024	Emily Oreste	
"Superscar"	2024	Likeromeo, Miguel Zárate and Adéla Jergová	
"MachineGirl"	2025	Mitch deQuilettes	
"DeathByDevotion"	2025	Sinclair	
"SexOnTheBeat"	2025	91 Rules	
"KGB"	2026	Rachel Dunkel	
"Red Bottoms"	2026	Emma Berson	
"Ain't in LA"	2026	Fred Gervais	
"Nicole Kidman"	2026	Hannah Lux Davis	
