= The Red Bottoms Tour =

2026-2027 concert tour by Adéla

- Tour by Adéla
- Promotional poster
- Location: Australia; Europe; North America
- Associated album: Prima
- Start date: 25 August 2026
- End date: 16 February 2027
- Legs: 2
- No. of shows: 41

Adéla concert chronology
- The ProvocaTour (2025); The Red Bottoms Tour (2026-2027)

The Red Bottoms Tour is a concert tour by Slovak singer-songwriter Adéla in support of her debut studio album, Prima (2026). It began on 25 August 2026, in London, and it is set to conclude in Melbourne on 16 February 2027, comprising 41 shows across Australia, Europe, and North America.

== Background and development ==
Adéla announced the Red Bottoms Tour on 26 May 2026, the day after she finished supporting Demi Lovato on her It's Not That Deep Tour. Many sources describe the Red Bottoms Tour as her debut; however, she had previously mounted the ProvocaTour the previous year. The Red Bottoms Tour originally comprised 21 initial dates across North America and London, with Paolo Ragusa of Consequence reporting that it would be in support of The Provocateur (2025). Adéla's debut studio album Prima was released on 4 September 2026; it included the single "Red Bottoms". On 21 August, the European dates for early 2027 were announced, with subsequent supplemental concerts and venue upgrades in various cities due to high demand. Moreover, Adéla's stylist and creative director, Chris Horan, collaborated with 5 Gum in the creation of a fashion collection incorporating pieces of gum chewed by Adéla during tour rehearsals, preserved in resin and transformed into clothing items donned on select US tour stops. The custom pieces worn onstage were auctioned, with proceeds profiting the Save the Music Foundation. Two new dates in Australia for February 2027 were added to the tour on 4 November 2026.

== Critical reception ==
Critics praised Adéla for her stage presence and performance skills

The Red Bottoms Tour has been met with highly positive reviews from critics. Recapping the opening show in London, Clash credited Adéla's stage skills by asserting that her vocals and movements were, respectively, "remarkably assured" and "deliberate", whilst characterising her interaction with the audience as "instinctive, not over-rehearsed." Caroline Safran of Rolling Stone lauded Adéla for "commanding the stage with the confidence of someone who can't imagine [herself] being anywhere else". Similarly, Melodic Magazine's Angel Escobar stated after the show in Atlanta that "she commanded the room with the kind of confidence and physicality that is difficult to teach", at the same time as deeming the choreography routine as "relentless, polished, and energetic." In the Dallas Observer, Preston Jones labelled the overall performance in Dallas "relentlessly athletic, hypersexual and startlingly vulnerable".

Writing for the Los Angeles Times, Mikael Wood complimented the singer's capacity of "bringing her songs to life on a stage that was bare except for a ballet barre", describing that the choreography "grew raunchier and more elaborate as the show progressed". Steven J. Horowitz from Variety called Adéla a "showwoman in the purest sense, working every angle and performing from her gut", adding that "she has made her intentions widely known: she wants to be a pop star […] Perhaps, if her Fonda show was any indication, that moment may have already arrived." Billboard's Alicia Urrea praised the singer's performance skills and deemed the show as a "victory lap", while assuring that the sold-out venue was "a testament to the career she is building now."

== Set list ==
This set list is from the 18 September 2026 concert in New York City. It does not represent all concerts for the tour.

1. "KGB"
2. "FinallyApologizing"
3. "Boys"
4. "Nasty Dirty Gross"
5. "Go"
6. "DeathByDevotion"
7. "Ain't in LA"
8. "Marijuana"
9. "I'm The Man"
10. "Kiss Here"
11. "Red Bottoms"
12. "Starving Artist"
13. "Fantasize"
14. "SexOnTheBeat"
15. "Superscar"

Encore

16. "Nicole Kidman"

=== Alterations ===
- During the first concert in Los Angeles, on 8 October 2026, "Homewrecked" was performed instead of "Kiss Here".

== Tour dates ==
List of 2026 concerts
Dates (2026)	City	Country	Venue
25 August	London	England	Outernet Live
9 September	Detroit	United States	Saint Andrew's Hall
11 September	Toronto	Canada	Phoenix Concert Theatre
12 September	Montreal	Canada	Théâtre Fairmount
14 September	Boston	United States	Royale
15 September	Washington, D.C.	United States	9:30 Club
17 September	Philadelphia	United States	Theatre of Living Arts
18 September	New York City (Note: Billed as Brooklyn in promotional material.)	United States	Brooklyn Steel
19 September	New York City	United States	Brooklyn Steel
21 September	Nashville	United States	The Basement East
22 September	Atlanta	United States	The Masquerade
24 September	Austin	United States	Emo's
25 September	Dallas	United States	The Echo Lounge & Music Hall
27 September (Note: This concert was part of Portola Music Festival.)	San Francisco	United States	Pier 80
29 September	Seattle	United States	The Showbox
30 September	Portland	United States	Crystal Ballroom
2 October	Salt Lake City	United States	The Depot
3 October	Denver	United States	Summit Music Hall
6 October	Phoenix	United States	Crescent Ballroom
8 October	Los Angeles	United States	The Fonda Theatre
9 October	Los Angeles	United States	The Fonda Theatre
15 October	Mexico City	Mexico	Foro Puebla
16 October	Mexico City	Mexico	Foro Puebla

List of 2027 concerts
Dates (2027)	City	Country	Venue
11 January	Prague	Czech Republic	Forum Karlín
13 January	Dublin	Ireland	3Olympia Theatre
14 January	Dublin	Ireland	3Olympia Theatre
16 January (Note: Originally scheduled to take place at the New Century Hall, the venue of this concert was upgraded due to high demand.)	Manchester	England	O_{2} Victoria Warehouse
17 January (Note: Originally scheduled to take place at SWG3 Galvanizers, the venue of this concert was upgraded due to high demand.)	Glasgow	Scotland	O_{2} Academy Glasgow
19 January	London	England	O_{2} Academy Brixton
20 January	London	England	O_{2} Academy Brixton
22 January	Paris	France	Bataclan
23 January	Cologne	Germany	Carlswerk Victoria
25 January	Brussels	Belgium	La Madeleine
26 January	Utrecht	Netherlands	TivoliVredenburg
28 January	Copenhagen	Denmark	Amager Bio
29 January	Stockholm	Sweden	Fryshuset
31 January (Note: Originally scheduled to take place at the Rockefeller Music Hall, the venue of this concert was upgraded due to high demand.)	Oslo	Norway	Sentrum Scene
2 February (Note: Originally scheduled to take place at the Metropol, the venue of this concert was upgraded due to high demand.)	Berlin	Germany	Huxley's Neue Welt
3 February	Warsaw	Poland	Klub Stodoła
11 February	Sydney	Australia	Enmore Theatre
16 February	Melbourne	Australia	Forum Theatre
