= Zoo (Shakira song) =

Single by Shakira

from the album Zootopia 2 (Original Motion Picture Soundtrack)
- Released: October 10, 2025
- Recorded: 2025
- Genre: Pop; champeta
- Length: 3:10
- Label: Universal Music Group
- Songwriters: Shakira; Ed Sheeran; Blake Slatkin
- Producers: Shakira; Alex (A.C.) Castillo; Ed Sheeran; Blake Slatkin

Shakira singles chronology
"Bésame" (2025)	"Zoo" (2025)	"Algo Tú" (2026)

Music video
- "Zoo" on YouTube

"Zoo" is a song by Colombian singer-songwriter Shakira. It was recorded from the 2025 film Zootopia 2, where Shakira voice acts as a pop star character named Gazelle. The song was released on October 10, 2025 through Universal Music Group and the music video premiered on November 12, 2025.

== Background and release ==
Shakira voice acted on the first Zootopia (2016) as the pop star character Gazelle and recorded the hit song "Try Everything" for the film. In 2025, she returned to her role as Gazelle to voice act in the sequel Zootopia 2. The song "Zoo" was released on October 10, 2025 as a digital single, with a physical 7" vinyl single being released in November.

A Japanese version, titled "Zoo ~Because You’re Here~" (Zoo ~君がいるから~, Zoo (Kimi ga Iru kara)), by Dream Ami, the Japanese voice actress of Gazelle, was released on December 19, 2025, as was a duet version by Shakira featuring Dream Ami. Ami commented on the song: "I was really impressed by the rhythmic tune and Shakira's powerful vocals, and I thought it was the kind of song that would have you tapping your body to the rhythm before you even knew it!"

== Composition ==
"Zoo" is an upbeat pop song that combines natural and modern Latin tropical sounds and champeta with urban pop touches. The instrumental features rhythmic Latin-style percussion and chords played on an electric guitar. The song has been compared to Shakira's 2010 single "Waka Waka" for its intro and percussion.

"Zoo" is a bilingual song with most lyrics in English and some in Spanish. Thematically, the song is centered around love, honoring diversity, and enjoying life. The lyrics draw inspiration from the lively animal world of Zootopia: "We're wild and we can't be tamed".

== Reception ==
Jeanette Hernandez from Remezcla hailed "Zoo" being "an earworm, with a catchy and repetitive 'a zoo, ooh-ooh' line that will stick to your brain." Sebastien Barbolla from Pop Cultr commented that the song's "rhythmic production" and "precision choreography" make it stand out in the modern music landscape, called it "a likely chart contender and a key pop moment for the final months of the year" while praising Shakira's "instinct for reinvention and her ability to make major cultural partnerships feel effortless and natural."

== Live performances ==
The song was added to the setlist of the Las Mujeres Ya No Lloran World Tour, during the second US leg.

== Chart performance ==
In the United States, the song debuted at number 77 on the Billboard Hot 100, which marks Shakira's 30th entry on the chart.

In Japan, as of 27 January 2026, the song surpassed Frozen 2 to become the fastest Disney song in Japan's streaming history to hit 30 million plays. Billboard Japan announced the results of its 2026 first-half chart rankings on 5 June 2026. Hot Animation — a chart that pulls tie-in songs from TV anime/films, as well as songs by anime voice actors, from the Billboard Japan Hot 100 — saw “Zoo” place 10th.

== Music video ==
The music video for "Zoo" was previewed at a show of Shakira's Las Mujeres Ya No Lloran World Tour in Quito, Ecuador. Directed by Hannah Lux Davis, the richly detailed video features Shakira and Zootopia characters in several locations featured on Zootopia 2: she climbs up a cliff, travels in a train, and performs in a gala. Shakira's outfits in the video are also inspired by Zootopia, including wearing gazelle horns. Kenneth Triviño from Ecuavisa called the video a "visual and cultural feast", calling the horns "a clear and elegant nod to her Lebanese roots" as gazelles live in the Middle East.

== Accolades ==
Awards and nominations for "Zoo"
Organization	Year	Category	Result	Ref.
Hollywood Music in Media Awards	2025	Original Song – Animated Film	Nominated	
Heat Latin Music Awards	2026	Best Song for a Video game, Series or Movie	Won	
Music Awards Japan	2026	Best International Pop Song in Japan	Nominated	
Music Awards Japan	2026	Best of Listeners' Choice: International Song	Nominated	
Society of Composers & Lyricists	2026	Outstanding Original Song for a Comedy or Musical Visual Media Production	Nominated	
Nickelodeon Kids' Choice Awards	2026	Favorite Song from a Movie	Nominated	

== Charts ==
=== Weekly charts ===
Weekly chart performance for "Zoo"
Chart (2025–2026)	Peak position
Argentina Anglo Airplay (Monitor Latino)	13
Australia (ARIA)	56
Belgium (Ultratop 50 Flanders)	2
Belgium (Ultratop 50 Wallonia)	2
Canada Hot 100 (Billboard)	51
Central America Anglo Airplay (Monitor Latino)	3
Chile Anglo Airplay (Monitor Latino)	9
CIS Airplay (TopHit)	92
Colombia Anglo Airplay (Monitor Latino)	10
Costa Rica Anglo Airplay (Monitor Latino)	3
Croatia International Airplay (Top lista)	58
Czech Republic Airplay (ČNS IFPI)	25
Czech Republic Singles Digital (ČNS IFPI)	47
Denmark Airplay (Tracklisten)	10
Dominican Republic Anglo Airplay (Monitor Latino)	9
Ecuador Anglo Airplay (Monitor Latino)	4
El Salvador Anglo Airplay (Monitor Latino)	4
France (SNEP)	16
France Airplay (SNEP)	1
Germany (GfK)	69
Global 200 (Billboard)	17
Guatemala Anglo Airplay (Monitor Latino)	3
Hong Kong (Billboard)	8
Ireland (IRMA)	67
Israel (Mako Hitlist)	69
Japan Hot 100 (Billboard)	11
Japan Combined Singles (Oricon)	21
Japan Hot Animation (Billboard Japan)	3
Latin America Anglo Airplay (Monitor Latino)	10
Malaysia (IFPI)	10
Malaysia International (RIM)	4
Mexico Anglo Airplay (Monitor Latino)	12
Netherlands (Dutch Top 40)	3
Netherlands (Single Top 100)	27
Netherlands Airplay (Radiomonitor)	3
New Zealand Hot Singles (RMNZ)	18
Nigeria (TurnTable Top 100)	85
Norway (VG-lista)	73
Panama Anglo Airplay (Monitor Latino)	9
Panama Streaming (PRODUCE)	120
Peru Anglo Airplay (Monitor Latino)	2
Poland (Polish Airplay Top 100)	6
Poland (Polish Streaming Top 100)	70
Portugal (AFP)	123
Puerto Rico Anglo Airplay (Monitor Latino)	10
Romania Airplay (TopHit)	74
Singapore (RIAS)	13
Slovakia Airplay (ČNS IFPI)	1
Slovakia Singles Digital (ČNS IFPI)	9
South Korea (Circle)	22
South Korea Hot 100 (Billboard)	22
Suriname (Nationale Top 40)	13
Sweden Heatseeker (Sverigetopplistan)	1
Switzerland (Schweizer Hitparade)	39
Taiwan (Billboard)	5
Turkey International Airplay (Radiomonitor Türkiye)	4
UK Singles (Official Charts)	42
Uruguay Anglo Airplay (Monitor Latino)	4
US Billboard Hot 100	73
Venezuela Airplay (Monitor Latino)	10
Vietnam (Billboard)	50

Chart performance for "Zoo (Kimi ga Iru kara)"
Chart (2025)	Peak position
Japan Download Songs (Billboard Japan)	50

=== Monthly charts ===
Monthly chart performance for "Zoo"
Chart (2026)	Position
Panama Streaming (PRODUCE)	130
South Korea (Circle)	35
Romania Airplay (TopHit)	80

== Certifications ==
Certifications for "Zoo"
Region	Certification	Certified units/sales
Belgium (BRMA)	Platinum	40,000^{‡}
Brazil (Pro-Música Brasil)	Platinum	40,000^{‡}
France (SNEP)	Diamond	333,333^{‡}
New Zealand (RMNZ)	Gold	15,000^{‡}
Portugal (AFP)	Gold	12,000^{‡}
United Kingdom (BPI)	Silver	200,000^{‡}
Streaming
Slovakia (ČNS IFPI)	Platinum	1,700,000^{†}
^{‡} Sales+streaming figures based on certification alone.^{†} Streaming-only figures based on certification alone.
