= Dave Stroud =

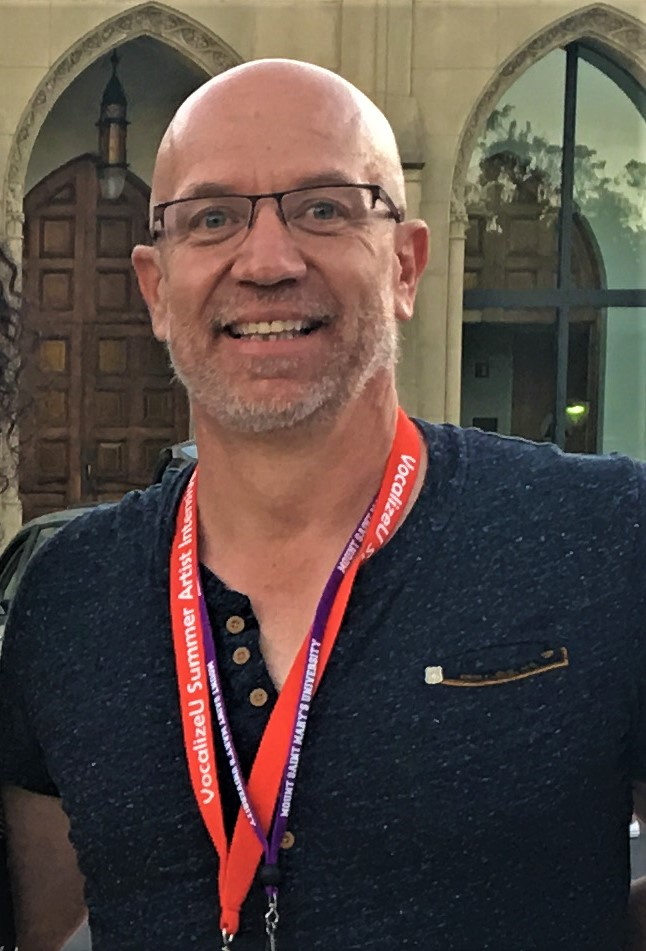

Background information
- Occupations: Vocal coach, vocal educator, artist development
- Instruments: Vocals, piano, guitar
- Years active: 1987–present
- Website: davestroud.com

Dave Stroud is an American vocal coach, vocal educator, and lecturer who has worked with Justin Bieber, Justin Timberlake, Steve Perry, Katseye, Adéla, Arnel Pineda, Billy Crystal, Mike Posner, Natasha Bedingfield, Bruno Mars, and Michael Jackson, among others. He was commissioned by American Idol for seasons 6, 8, 9, 10, and 11 as a vocal teacher for touring idols Adam Lambert, Jordin Sparks, Allison Iraheta, David Cook, Lee DeWyze, Lauren Alaina, Scotty McCreery, and others. Stroud was a vocal coach on the Netflix series, Pop Star Academy: KATSEYE, which aired in 2024.

== Early life ==
In 1989, Stroud owned and operated,DV8, a dance nightclub in Salt Lake City, Utah, modeled after night clubs in Los Angeles. In 1990, he began studying with Seth Riggs in San Francisco, with whom he developed a teaching business that expanded Riggs' vocal teaching methods. In 1998, he oversaw the production of When You Believe (written by Narada Michael Walden), recorded by over 60 singers including Claytoven Richardson and Penny Framstad, and produced by Geoff Grace. The song shared similarities to We are the World and received a fair amount of airplay.

== Career ==
Dave Stroud is a vocal coach, vocal educator, and lecturer who has led vocal master-classes internationally. He has worked with Natasha Bedingfield, Martina McBride, Justin Bieber, Kelly Clarkson, One Direction, Terry Ellis, Daniel Bedingfield, Michael Jackson ("This is it" tour), and others. Stroud was the owner and publisher of Connecting Voices, a magazine for singers.

- VocalizeU

In 2010 Stroud founded and launched, VocalizeU teaching privately as well as producing Winter Songwriting Retreats in the San Bernardino Mountains to focus on artists' identity, vocal development, creativity, and songwriting skills. In July 2012, Stroud's company produced VocalizeU Summer Intensive, a yearly 10-day artist intensive focusing on vocals, songwriting, stage presence, and music production at Mount Saint Mary's University, Los Angeles. Music industry professionals and producers are brought in to share their knowledge and experience with 300 students.

- American Idol

Stroud was commissioned by American Idol as a vocal coach to work with touring idols in Seasons 6, 8, 9, 10, and 11 working with Adam Lambert, Jordin Sparks, Allison Iraheta, David Cook, Lee DeWyze, Lauren Alaina, Scotty McCreery, and others. He continues to provide vocal support for American Idol and 19 Management regularly. In an interview with Backstage Magazine, Stroud shared insights working with Adam Lambert, "Adam can do extreme things with his voice that most singers will probably never be able to do. The fact is Adam is so amazing that he doesn't have to overdo it. I work with the music director to look at the peaks, where they happen in the show, and where he can recover from that"

- SLS (Speech-Level Singing)

Stroud is the former CEO of Seth Riggs's SLS (speech level singing) vocal teaching program and played a major role in developing the teaching platform internationally. A then-longtime student and friend of Riggs, Stroud formulated criteria to teach Speech-Level Singing internationally. Riggs created vocal exercises that blended a singers' head voice and chest voice while applying SLS (speech level singing) techniques. His clients included Prince, Stevie Wonder, Madonna, Barbra Streisand, and numerous others. In 1995, Stroud developed a teaching platform, which was implemented in 2000.

- Film and TV

- 2009 - Michael Jackson's This Is It - vocal coach
- 2022 - Mr. Saturday Night - vocal coach
- 2024 - Netflix Pop Star Academy: KATSEYE - vocal coach
- 2026 - Kelly Clarkson Show - vocal coach
