= What's Wrong with New York? =

Studio album by the Dare
- Released: September 6, 2024
- Recorded: 2022–2024
- Genres: Electroclash; electro-rock; new rave; dance-punk
- Length: 27:24
- Labels: The Dare Is a Business; Polydor; Republic
- Producer: Harrison Patrick Smith

The Dare chronology
The Sex EP (2023)	What's Wrong with New York? (2024)	Freakquencies: Volume 1 EP (2025)

Singles from What's Wrong with New York?
- 1. "Girls" Released: August 5, 2022; 2. "Good Time" Released: March 3, 2023; 3. "Perfume" Released: June 21, 2024; 4. "You're Invited" Released: August 7, 2024

What's Wrong with New York? is the debut studio album by American musician the Dare, released on September 6, 2024, through Polydor and Republic. Upon its release, the album received generally positive reviews from critics.

== Background ==
What's Wrong with New York? marks the follow-up to The Dare's debut EP The Sex EP (2023), including two tracks from the EP, "Girls" and "Good Time". Per the New York Times, the album embodies the "electroclash revival" movement and draws inspiration from early-2000s New York City dance-rock artists including LCD Soundsystem, Yeah Yeah Yeahs, and Fischerspooner.

In addition to "Girls" and "Good Time", the album's release was preceded by two singles, "Perfume" and "You're Invited", each with an accompanying music video.

== Critical reception ==
Professional ratings
Aggregate scores
Source	Rating
Metacritic	72/100
Review scores
Source	Rating
Clash	8/10
DIY	4.5/5 stars
KTLA	5/5 stars
NME	3/5 stars
Paste	6.4/10
Pitchfork	6.2/10
The Skinny	5/5 stars

What's Wrong with New York? was met with generally positive reviews. At Metacritic, the album received an aggregate score of 72 based on 9 reviews, indicating "generally favorable reviews".

In a five-star review for the Skinny, Jamie Wilde drew comparisons to LCD Soundsystem, CSS, and Albert Hammond Jr. of the Strokes, concluding, "Sonic debauchery laced with moments of introspection, The Dare's debut is worth the hype." Aimee Phillips of Clash called the album "a 'Party Rock Anthem' record for the indie sleaze renaissance," adding: "Tastefully rambunctious, What's Wrong With New York? is a sonic melting pot of millennial and Gen Z sounds. With retro drums and abrasive synth basses, it’s a performance-geared record filled with pulsating bass lines, perfect for making bad decisions in a sweaty basement." In another five-star review for KTLA in Los Angeles, Russell Falcon wrote that the album's influences felt like a "warm embrace of the familiar" for millennials, writing that, "while previous generations of artists were influenced by The Beatles or Fleetwood Mac or Michael Jackson, there’s been no preparation for millennials on how to react when new music starts sounding like… LMFAO. And that’s intended to be a huge compliment."

In a 4.5-star review for DIY, Otis Robinson compared the album to fellow 2024 release Brat by Charli XCX, for which The Dare produced the bonus track "Guess", writing: "electroclash revival record What’s Wrong With New York? has all the too-cool-for-school irreverence and ecstasy of Charli's clubby project. It's another hedonistic pop bible for disillusioned ne'er-do-wells with a penchant for bumps and lines—albeit one less for coquettish it girls than metrosexual lotharios."

In a more mixed review for Paste, Devon Chodzin described the album as "a mixed bag of bite-size party anthems and wearisome earworms that provoke even if you’re not looking for provocation," while complimenting the over-the-top style of tracks like "Perfume". Jordan Bassett of NME gave the album three out of five stars, concluding, "you'd be better off just listening to LCD [Soundsystem]."

== Track listing ==
All tracks are written and produced by Harrison Patrick Smith, except where listed.

What's Wrong with New York? track listing
No.	Title	Writer(s)	Producer(s)	Length
1.	"Open Up"		Smith; Chris Greatti^{[c]}	2:41
2.	"Good Time"			2:13
3.	"Perfume"			2:27
4.	"Girls"			1:59
5.	"I Destroyed Disco"	Smith; Dylan Brady	Smith; Brady^{[c]}	2:21
6.	"You're Invited"	Smith; Emile Haynie; Liam Hall		2:32
7.	"All Night"	Smith; Isaac Eiger	Smith; Greatti^{[c]}; Eiger^{[c]}	3:53
8.	"Elevation"	Smith; Romil Hemnani; Jonah Abraham	Smith; Hemnani^{[c]}; Abraham^{[c]}	3:56
9.	"Movement"		Smith; Brady^{[a]}	2:31
10.	"You Can Never Go Home"			2:47
Total length:				27:24

What's Wrong with New York?: Afters deluxe edition track listing
No.	Title	Writer(s)	Length
1.	"Cheeky"		2:35
2.	"LCA"		2:39
3.	"I Can't Escape Myself"	Adrian Borland	3:48

Notes

- ^{^[a]} signifies an additional producer
- ^{^[c]} signifies a co-producer

== Personnel ==
- Harrison Patrick Smith - art direction, design, writing, production, engineering
- Chris Greatti - co-production (track 1); vocal engineering (tracks 1, 3, 7); guitar (track 1); additional production (track 7)
- Melody English - background vocals (tracks 1, 10)
- Allyson Committa - background vocals (track 4)
- May Rio Sembera - background vocals (track 4)
- Sami Perez - vocal engineering (track 4)
- Dylan Brady - additional production (tracks 5, 9)
- Samuel Rosin - vocal engineering (tracks 5, 9)
- Emile Haynie - co-writer (track 6)
- Liam Hall - co-writer, additional production (track 6)
- Isaac Elger - co-writer (track 7)
- Romil Hemnani - co-writer, co-production, vocal engineering (track 8)
- Jonah Abraham - additional production (track 8)
- Sam Glick - vocal engineering (track 10)
- Lars Stalfors - mixing
- Ben Shirken - mixing (track 4)
- Ruairi O'Flaherty - mastering
- Bryce Segall - art direction, management
- Richard Kern - photography
- Sam Wachs - photography
- David Wolter - A&R
- Nick Sylvester - indispensable advice and guidance
