= Ain't in LA =

2026 single by Adéla

Single by Adéla

from the album Prima
- B-side: "Nicole Kidman"
- Written: c. 2025 – 2026 (Note: For Who What Wear, Adéla recalled that she started working on "Ain't In LA" after visiting her family for Christmas in 2025.)
- Released: 23 July 2026
- Genre: Synth-pop
- Length: 3:04
- Label: Capitol
- Songwriters: Adéla Jergová; Blake Slatkin; Dylan Brady; Billy Walsh; Theron Thomas
- Producers: Blake Slatkin; Dylan Brady

Adéla singles chronology
"Red Bottoms" (2026)	"Ain't in LA" (2026)	"Nicole Kidman" (2026)

Music video
- "Ain't in LA" on YouTube

"Ain't in LA" is a song by Slovak singer and songwriter Adéla from her debut studio album Prima (2026). It was released on 23 July 2026 through Capitol Records as the third single from the album. The song was written by Adéla, Theron Thomas, Blake Slatkin, Dylan Brady, and Billy Walsh, and was produced by Slatkin and Brady. It is a synth-pop track inspired by the early 2010s whose lyrics reject the idea that success is dependent on moving to Los Angeles.

"Ain't in LA" received critical acclaim for its anthemic chorus and autobiographical themes and was described as one of the best songs of the year. It became Adéla's breakthrough hit and her first entry on the US Billboard Hot 100, peaking in the top 25 and making her the first Slovak artist to enter the chart in history. The song topped the charts in the Philippines and Singapore and peaked at number four on the Billboard Global 200. It additionally reached the top ten in Australia, Austria, Germany, Ireland, New Zealand, and Slovakia, the top twenty in Canada, the Czech Republic and the United Kingdom, and the top forty in the Netherlands and Sweden.

== Background and release ==
In May 2025, Adéla announced that she had signed with Capitol Records and Polydor Records. She released The Provocateur, her debut extended play (EP), on 22 August 2025. Starting on 8 April 2026, she performed as the opening act for Demi Lovato's It's Not That Deep Tour, during which she performed a number of new tracks including "Ain't in LA". She released the first two singles from her upcoming album, "KGB" and "Red Bottoms", on 17 April and 12 June respectively. On 23 July, Adéla announced her debut studio album Prima and released its third single "Ain't in LA".

== Composition and lyrics ==
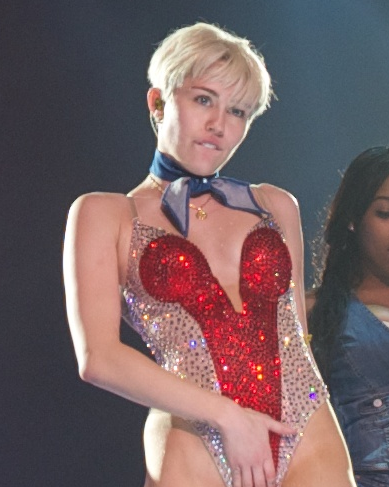
Critics compared "Ain't in LA" to the song "We Can't Stop" by Miley Cyrus (pictured).

"Ain't in LA" is a synth-pop track built around 808s, glitchy drums, chopped vocal samples, and heavy synths. It opens with a deep bass voice before shifting into an anthemic chorus. The song's production deliberately draws on the sound of early-2010s pop, with Adéla citing early ASAP Rocky as an inspiration. Theron Thomas contributed the chopped and screwed introduction, which received comparisons to the opening of Miley Cyrus's 2013 song "We Can't Stop", also co-written by Thomas.

"Ain't in LA" was inspired by a photograph Adéla found of her mother as a teenager in Slovakia standing in front of a wall of pop-culture posters in her childhood bedroom. Her mother had intended to move to Los Angeles to pursue her ambitions, but ultimately did not end up doing so after becoming pregnant with Adéla's older brother. This prompted Adéla to reflect on women with ambitions who never received recognition. The song was written in a studio session with writers Theron Thomas, Blake Slatkin, Dylan Brady and Billy Walsh, after Adéla asked to try one more idea while thinking about the photograph of her mother. Thomas said "Ain’t in LA" was the only fully completed song to emerge from the sessions he and Adéla worked on together.

The song's central message is that dreams do not belong exclusively to Los Angeles and that aspiring artists do not necessarily need to leave their hometowns to fulfill their goals. According to Adéla, "Ain't in LA" is not a rejection of Los Angeles specifically but rather uses it as a symbol for something bigger that people believe they must reach to achieve their ambitions. Elle connected this idea to the American Dream and the longstanding belief that relocating to a major city is required for success. "Ain't in LA" challenges this assumption by celebrating people from smaller cities and questioning the idea that talented people must leave their communities to succeed.

== Critical reception ==
"Ain't in LA" received acclaim from music critics, who identified it as one of the best songs of the year. Writing for Billboard, Kyle Denis declared it the best song of Prima and a "pivotal moment in contemporary pop songwriting", praising its anthemic hook and its meaningful message that pop stars can come from anywhere in the globe. NME's Bailey Slater characterized it as an "anthem of escapism" that showcased her her Eastern European heritage and vocals. Jem Aswad of Variety named "Ain’t in LA" one of the year's strongest singles and highlighted its chopped-and-screwed vocal hook. Writing for Rolling Stone, Larisha Paul similarly identified the song as a defining track of Adéla's career to that point, emphasizing its optimism, confidence, and connection to the sound of early-2010s pop. Dylan Bedsaul of Slant Magazine described the song as a "feel-good" track that honors Adéla's background as a young girl in Bratislava with dreams of becoming a performer. In a broader cultural analysis, Ekta Sinha opined for Elle that the song resonated because listeners could apply its message to their own hometowns and countries, turning videos made with the song into expressions of local pride.

== Music video ==
The accompanying music video for "Ain't in LA" was directed by Fred Gervais and filmed in Adéla's hometown of Bratislava, Slovakia. The video surrounds the singer in imagery of American celebrity culture in a Slovak setting "thousands of miles from Hollywood", reflecting the song's themes of ambition not being exclusive to Los Angeles.

== Commercial performance ==
"Ain't in LA" reached number 4 on the Billboard Global 200 chart, becoming her first top-ten song on the chart and the first debut artist to hold two top-five hits in the tier on each ranking alongside "Nicole Kidman".

In Slovakia, the song debuted at number five on the Slovakia Singles Digital Top 100, becoming her first top ten entry and her third single to debut on the chart. The song entered the top three, and peaked at number two. It also was certified platinum in the country, denoting one million seven hundred and fifty thousand streams.

In the United States, "Ain't in LA" debuted at number 85 on the Billboard Hot 100, becoming Adéla's first entry on the chart and the first song by a Slovak artist to chart. The song peaked at number 24.

In the United Kingdom "Ain't in LA" officially debuted at number 59 on the UK singles chart, peaking at number 12. The song also debuted at number 35 on the Irish Singles Chart, becoming Adéla's first top-ten song, peaking at 9. In Australia, "Ain't in LA" and "Nicole Kidman" reached the top ten.

== Charts ==
=== Weekly charts ===
Weekly chart performance
Chart (2026)	Peak position
Argentina Anglo Airplay (Monitor Latino)	7
Australia (ARIA)	7
Australia Airplay (RCS)	11
Austria (Ö3 Austria Top 40)	5
Austria Airplay (MusicTrace)	26
Belgium (Ultratop 50 Flanders)	23
Brazil Hot 100 (Billboard)	83
Canada Hot 100 (Billboard)	11
Canada AC (Billboard)	27
Canada CHR/Top 40 (Billboard)	8
Canada Hot AC (Billboard)	32
Chile Anglo Airplay (Monitor Latino)	11
CIS Airplay (TopHit)	131
Croatia International Airplay (Top lista)	13
Czech Republic Airplay (ČNS IFPI)	5
Czech Republic Singles Digital (ČNS IFPI)	4
Estonia Airplay (TopHit)	39
Finland (Suomen virallinen lista)	19
France (SNEP)	88
France Airplay (SNEP)	24
Germany (GfK)	3
Germany Airplay (MusicTrace)	3
Global 200 (Billboard)	4
Greece International (IFPI)	3
Guatemala Anglo Airplay (Monitor Latino)	11
Hong Kong (Billboard)	22
Iceland (Billboard)	19
Indonesia (Billboard)	19
Ireland (IRMA)	9
Italy Airplay (EarOne)	6
Latvia Streaming (LaIPA)	10
Lebanon (Lebanese Top 20)	16
Lithuania (AGATA)	23
Lithuania Airplay (TopHit)	23
Luxembourg (Billboard)	15
Malaysia (IFPI)	5
Malaysia International (RIM)	4
Malta Airplay (Radiomonitor)	14
Mexico Anglo Airplay (Monitor Latino)	10
Netherlands (Dutch Top 40)	12
Netherlands (Single Top 100)	26
New Zealand (Recorded Music NZ)	5
New Zealand Airplay (RCS)	7
Nicaragua Anglo Airplay (Monitor Latino)	3
Norway (VG-lista)	16
Norway Airplay (IFPI)	67
Panama Streaming (PRODUCE)	54
Paraguay Anglo Airplay (Monitor Latino)	12
Philippines (IFPI)	1
Philippines Hot 100 (Billboard Philippines)	1
Poland Airplay (OLiS)	38
Poland Streaming (OLiS)	27
Portugal (AFP)	27
Romania (Billboard)	15
San Marino Airplay (SMRTV Top 50)	4
Serbia Airplay (Radiomonitor)	17
Singapore (RIAS)	1
Slovakia Airplay (ČNS IFPI)	3
Slovakia Singles Digital (ČNS IFPI)	2
Spain Airplay (Promusicae)	13
Sweden (Sverigetopplistan)	21
Switzerland (Schweizer Hitparade)	14
Switzerland Airplay (MusicTrace)	32
Thailand (Billboard)	25
United Arab Emirates (IFPI)	12
UK Singles (Official Charts)	12
US Billboard Hot 100	24
US Adult Pop Airplay (Billboard)	40
US Pop Airplay (Billboard)	15
US Rhythmic Airplay (Billboard)	30

=== Monthly charts ===
Monthly chart performance
Chart (2026)	Peak position
Estonia Airplay (TopHit)	51
Lithuania Airplay (TopHit)	48
Panama Streaming (PRODUCE)	74

== Certifications ==
Certifications for Ain't in LA
Region	Certification	Certified units/sales
Canada (Music Canada)	Platinum	80,000^{‡}
New Zealand (RMNZ)	Gold	15,000^{‡}
United Kingdom (BPI)	Silver	200,000^{‡}
Streaming
Czech Republic (ČNS IFPI)	Gold	2,500,000^{†}
Slovakia (ČNS IFPI)	Platinum	1,750,000^{†}
^{‡} Sales+streaming figures based on certification alone.^{†} Streaming-only figures based on certification alone.

== Release history ==
Release dates and formats for "Ain't in LA"
Region	Date	Format(s)	Version	Label	Ref.
Various	23 July 2026	Digital download; streaming	Original	Capitol	
United States	18 August 2026	Contemporary hit radio	Original	Capitol	
Italy	18 September 2026	Radio airplay	Original	EMI	
Various	25 September 2026	Digital download; streaming	"Coachella 2016" remix	Capitol	
United States	11 November 2026	7-inch single	Original	Capitol	
