= Zootopia 2 (soundtrack) =

2025 film score by Michael Giacchino

Zootopia 2 (Original Motion Picture Soundtrack)

Film score by Michael Giacchino
- Released: November 21, 2025
- Recorded: 2025
- Studios: Eastwood Scoring Stage, Warner Bros. Studios, Burbank, California
- Genre: Film score
- Length: 66:52
- Label: Walt Disney
- Producer: Michael Giacchino

Michael Giacchino chronology
The Fantastic Four: First Steps (Original Motion Picture Soundtrack) (2025)	Zootopia 2 (Original Motion Picture Soundtrack) (2025)	Spider-Man: Brand New Day (Original Motion Picture Soundtrack) (2026)

Singles from Zootopia 2
- 1. "Zoo" Released: October 10, 2025

Zootopia 2 (Original Motion Picture Soundtrack) is the soundtrack album to the 2025 Disney animated film Zootopia 2, directed by Jared Bush and Byron Howard, which is the sequel to Zootopia (2016). The film score is composed by Michael Giacchino, who scored the first movie, and consists of 23 compositions. The album has the original song "Zoo" performed by Shakira, which she co-wrote with Ed Sheeran and Blake Slatkin. The album was released by Walt Disney Records on November 21, 2025.

== Development ==
On June 16, 2025, Michael Giacchino was confirmed to be returning to compose the score. Giacchino said that he wanted to be involved in the sequel because of his experience on working in Zootopia being memorable and loved the work. Although he was committed to score The Fantastic Four: First Steps, Giacchino was able to commit to Zootopia 2 as well, as neither project overlapped the other. Having liked the script and the directors' work, he began writing the music immediately after his work on Fantastic Four was finished, and said "it was not a tortured process."

On scoring the sequel, Giacchino said that he had no rules on writing the score and had full freedom to express his musical ideas. Hence, the music has different styles, which Giacchino described it as "the most insane score" he had written, saying it was "more cartoony and dumber." The musical styles change as the film progresses, ranging from Spanish to heavy metal. Giacchino recalled that he liked the Warner Bros. cartoons and how Carl W. Stalling's fun-filled compositions provided an energy to them, which balanced the emotions with the insanity happening on screen. Following a similar approach with the instrumentation, Giacchino went to a rental house and used a variety of percussions such as flapamba, as well as other instruments. According to Giacchino, he made the music "dumber" by experimenting with sounds and instruments, describing it as an eighth grade approach, but also kept the emotional core intact.

Giacchino was influenced by John Williams' approach for The Empire Strikes Back (1980), where he developed new themes for the film, expanding the scope and environment. Hence, he wanted to create new themes to weave into the fabric of Zootopia, as the film featured new characters and environments, which was fun-filled and different. Giacchino's favorite material was the score for the sneaky Lynxes, which were more fun. The theme was an elegant and old-fashioned waltz which felt very refined as well as a demented hero theme, while the theme for Gary the snake was rooted in history.

Giacchino began conducting the music even before the premiere of The Fantastic Four: First Steps. He collaborated with the musicians who he had worked with for around two decades, describing it as an emotional bond between the two. Furthermore, the score was recorded together in a single room at the Warner Bros. Eastwood Scoring Stage; Giacchino felt having every musician working together in an orchestra brought the soul and energy that was missing from when it was done separately, as it had been during the COVID-19 pandemic.

During at the Eastwood Scoring Stage, it was announced that Charlie Bisharat would join the music department as a featured instrumentalist, playing both the violin and country fiddle in his twenty-eighth collaboration with Giacchino.

Shakira announced that she wrote a new song for the film alongside Ed Sheeran and Blake Slatkin, as well as returning as the voice of Gazelle. The song's title was later revealed to be "Zoo".

== Release ==
The song "Zoo" was teased in the film's trailer that was released on September 29, 2025. The full song was later released as a single on October 10, and a music video featuring Shakira was released a month later on November 12, 2025. Giacchino's score was released as part of the film's full soundtrack on November 21, 2025.

== Reception ==
Peter Debruge of Variety and Frank Scheck of The Hollywood Reporter found the score "zany" and "exciting". Therese Lacson of Collider wrote "Giacchino's presence is immediately felt in the sweeping soundtrack that sets the tone perfectly, and it's a significant step up from his work on the original film." Eric Goldman of MovieWeb called it a "dependably wonderful and lively score".

== Track listing ==
All music is composed by Michael Giacchino, except where noted.

Zootopia 2 (Original Motion Picture Soundtrack)
No.	Title	Writer(s)	Performer	Length
1.	"Zoo"	Ed Sheeran; Shakira; Blake Slatkin	Shakira	3:10
2.	"Zootopening"			0:55
3.	"The Old Zoo Review"			1:52
4.	"Hot Fursuit"			2:55
5.	"A Commuted Relationship"			0:56
6.	"Journey to the Journal"			3:20
7.	"Snake Away Pt. 1"			2:15
8.	"Snake Away Pt. 2"			2:33
9.	"Big Into Fashion"			0:28
10.	"Marsh Market"			1:31
11.	"Snaking the Journal"			3:40
12.	"Das Goats"			1:11
13.	"Get Out of Lodge"			1:56
14.	"Wilde Caught"			2:21
15.	"Cover Story"			4:07
16.	"Wall of Judy"			3:35
17.	"The Weak Lynx"			2:20
18.	"Gary a Twain Shall Meet"			4:51
19.	"Bunny and Overshare"			2:36
20.	"World's Worst Detention"			3:23
21.	"Our Differences Don't Make Any Difference"			2:49
22.	"Zootopia 2 Suite"			10:10
23.	"Lizard Lounge" (bonus track)			3:48
24.	"Flash from the Past" (bonus track)			0:09
Total length:				66:52

== Charts ==
Chart performance
Chart (2025–2026)	Peak position
French Albums (SNEP)	97
Japanese Combined Albums (Oricon)	38
Japanese Hot Albums (Billboard Japan)	9
US Kid Albums (Billboard)	3
US Soundtrack Albums (Billboard)	14

== Accolades ==
List of award nominations received by Zootopia 2 (soundtrack)
Award	Date of ceremony	Category	Recipient	Result	Ref.
Annie Awards	February 21, 2026	Best Music – Feature	Shakira, Ed Sheeran, Blake Slatkin, and Michael Giacchino	Nominated	
Music Awards Japan	June 13, 2026	Best International Pop Song in Japan	"Zoo" – Shakira	Nominated	
Music Awards Japan	June 13, 2026	Best of Listeners' Choice: International Song	"Zoo" – Shakira	Nominated	
Hollywood Music in Media Awards	November 19, 2025	Best Original Song – Animated Film	"Zoo" – Shakira, Ed Sheeran, and Blake Slatkin (songwriters); Shakira (performer)	Nominated	
Society of Composers & Lyricists	February 6, 2026	Outstanding Original Song for a Comedy or Musical Visual Media Production	"Zoo" – Shakira, Ed Sheeran, and Blake Slatkin	Nominated	
International Film Music Critics Association Awards	February 26, 2026	Best Original Score for an Animated Film	Michael Giacchino	Won	
