= Prima (album) =

Studio album by Adéla
- Released: 4 September 2026
- Genre: Pop
- Length: 31:12
- Label: Capitol
- Producers: Dylan Brady; Blake Slatkin; The Dare; Cashmere Cat; Count Baldor; Atlgrandma; Isaac Eiger; Billy Walsh; Julia Michaels

Adéla chronology
The Provocateur (2025)	Prima (2026)

Singles from Prima
- 1. "KGB" Released: 17 April 2026; 2. "Red Bottoms" Released: 12 June 2026; 3. "Ain't in LA" Released: 23 July 2026; 4. "Nicole Kidman" Released: 4 September 2026

Prima (stylized in all uppercase) is the debut studio album by Slovak singer-songwriter Adéla. It was released on 4 September 2026 through Capitol Records. It explores lyrical themes of insecurities, toxic relationships, success, and personal identity. Its title is derived from the term prima ballerina, the highest rank a ballerina can attain. Critics described Prima as a pop album with elements of R&B, hip-hop, and electropop.

The album was supported by four singles: "KGB", "Red Bottoms", "Ain't in LA", and "Nicole Kidman". "Ain't in LA" became the first song by a Slovak artist to chart on the US Billboard Hot 100, and attained viral success on the social media platform TikTok, with "Nicole Kidman" charting within the top ten of the Hot 100.

It charted at number one in Slovakia and the Netherlands, and reached the top ten in Australia, Austria, Belgium, Canada, Czech Republic, Finland, Germany, Ireland, New Zealand, the UK, and the US. To promote the album, Adéla is embarking on the Red Bottoms Tour, which began on 25 August 2026 in London, and is set to conclude on 16 February 2027 in Melbourne.

== Background ==
After competing and being eliminated in the 2023 Hybe and Geffen Records reality competition series Dream Academy alongside 19 other female acts and appearing in the Netflix documentary Pop Star Academy: Katseye, Adéla embarked on her solo career. On 13 September 2024, she released her debut single "Homewrecked", which preceded her debut extended play (EP) The Provocateur. The EP was released on 22 August 2025.

== Composition ==
Prima is mainly a pop album, with hyperpop and electropop influences. Some tracks use AutoTune. Adéla co-wrote the album with musicians such as Billy Walsh, Julia Michaels and Blake Slatkin.

The opening track, "KGB" is a dance-pop and electro-pop anthem with tech house influences. Lyrically, she uses the phrase KGB, the Soviet Union's secret police agency, as a metaphor for her relentless training and studying to become a popstar. The track "Ain't in LA" is a synth-pop song featuring heavy synths and a deep bass voice. It lyrically rejects the idea that success is confined to Los Angeles.

== Release and promotion ==
Adéla performing on the Red Bottoms Tour in New York City, 2026

On 17 April 2026, "KGB" was released as the lead single from Prima. It was followed by "Red Bottoms" on 12 June, and "Ain't in LA" on 23 July; the latter marked Adéla's international breakthrough single, becoming the first song by a Slovak artist to chart on the US Billboard Hot 100 and attained viral success on the social media app TikTok. The song topped the music chart in the Philippines, and peaked at number three in Slovakia, and at number five in Singapore. After the release of "Ain't in LA", Adéla announced the release of Prima on Instagram with an expected release date of 4 September 2026. Physical CDs, vinyls, and Prima merchandise were made available at the same time. "Nicole Kidman" was released as the fourth single from Prima on 4 September alongside the rest of the album.

Prior to the release of the album, Adéla performed songs from the track listing at the Lollapolooza festival in August 2026. She then embarked on the Red Bottoms Tour, which began on 25 August 2026 in London, England, and is set to conclude on 16 February 2027 in Melbourne, Australia. In further promotion of Prima, Adéla appeared on the cover of several magazines including Clash, Teen Vogue, and Vogue Czechoslovakia.

== Critical reception ==
Professional ratings
Aggregate scores
Source	Rating
AnyDecentMusic?	6.4/10
Metacritic	69/100
Review scores
Source	Rating
Clash	8/10
The Guardian	3/5 stars
The Line of Best Fit	6/10
NME	3.5/5 stars
Rolling Stone	3.5/5 stars
Slant Magazine	3.5/5 stars
The Sydney Morning Herald	5/5 stars
Pitchfork	5.7/10

AnyDecentMusic? gave the album a weighted average score of 6.4 out of 10 from seven critic scores. According to Metacritic, it received "generally favorable" reviews based on a weighted average score of 69 out of 100 from eight critic scores.

Jem Aswad of Variety deemed the album "more memorable and more unusual" than her previous releases. While Alexis Petridis of The Guardian gave the album three out of five stars, he opined that the album "puts a distinctive spin on the best of 00s hedonism". The album was rated 3.5 out of five stars by Rolling Stone. Writing for Billboard, Kyle Denis stated that the album has its weaker moments but "they barely cast a shadow over the LP". He also said that "In an era rife with pop singers who don’t really know exactly what they want to say or why they want to make music, Adéla has put the entire scene on notice with Prima."

== Commercial performance ==
In the United States, Prima debuted at number four on the Billboard 200, selling 56,000 album-equivalent units, 31,000 pure sales and 25,000 streaming units. It also debuted at number one on the Top Album Sales chart and at number 14 at Top Streaming Albums chart in the country.

In Australia, the album debuted at number six. Along with this, "Ain't in LA" rose to a new peak of 15. In the United Kingdom, the Official Charts Company reported that the album moved 12,253 units in its debut week, peaking at number two after a chart battle with Kasabian's Act III. This also made her the first Slovak artist to have an album enter the chart. It also peaked at number eight on the UK Album Downloads Chart.

== Track listing ==
Prima track listing
No.	Title	Writer(s)	Producer(s)	Length
1.	"KGB"	Adéla Jergová; Billy Walsh; Ali Tamposi; Blake Slatkin; Dylan Brady; Harrison Smith	Slatkin; Brady; The Dare	2:38
2.	"Nicole Kidman"	Jergová; Walsh; Julia Michaels; Uffie; Slatkin; Brady	Slatkin; Brady	3:01
3.	"I'm the Man"	Jergová; Walsh; Caroline Ailin; Slatkin; Magnus Høiberg	Slatkin; Cashmere Cat	2:30
4.	"Boys"	Jergová; Walsh; Michaels; Slatkin; Brady	Slatkin; Brady	2:24
5.	"Red Bottoms"	Jergová; Walsh; Michaels; Slatkin; Brady	Slatkin; Brady	3:06
6.	"Hitachi"	Jergová; Walsh; Michaels; Brady; Slatkin	Slatkin	3:36
7.	"Fantasize"	Jergová; Michaels; Olivia Waithe; Slatkin; Tom Parker	Slatkin; Count Baldor; Brady	3:03
8.	"Starving Artist"	Jergová; Walsh; Michaels; Slatkin; Brady	Slatkin; Brady	3:00
9.	"Marijuana"	Jergová; Walsh; Slatkin; Isaac Eiger; Liam Hall	Slatkin; Eiger; Atlgrandma	1:50
10.	"Therapy"	Jergová; Brady	Brady; Slatkin; Walsh; Michaels	3:00
11.	"Ain't in LA"	Jergová; Walsh; Theron Thomas; Slatkin; Brady	Slatkin; Brady	3:04
Total length:				31:12

Digital website edition bonus track
No.	Title	Writer(s)	Length
12.	"Nasty Dirty Gross"	Jergová	2:18
Total length:			33:30

iTunes Store bonus track
No.	Title	Writer(s)	Producer(s)	Length
12.	"Kiss Here"	Jergová; Slatkin; Brady; Walsh; Michaels	Brady; Slatkin; Walsh; Michaels	2:38
Total length:				33:50

=== Notes ===
- "Boys" includes uncredited spoken excerpts from Lara Raj.
- On physical editions of Prima, the second verse in "Nicole Kidman" contains different lyrics from the digitally released version.
  - "Fantasize" also features an extended intro. However, there are no lyrical changes.
  - "Marijuana" features an early demo, featuring a slightly altered instrumental and vocal mastering.

== Personnel ==
Credits are adapted from Tidal.

- Adéla – vocals
- Blake Slatkin – engineering (all tracks), vocal production (1–9), synthesizer (1–6, 9, 11), drums (1), drum programming (2–6, 8, 11), keyboards (2, 4–9, 11), guitar (2, 5, 7, 11), Mellotron (2), bass guitar (4), mixing (5)
- Ruairi O'Flaherty – mastering
- Bart Schoudel – vocal engineering (1), vocal production (2–9, 11), engineering (2–9)
- Serban Ghenea – mixing (1–5)
- Bryce Bordone – mixing (1–4)
- Dylan Brady – synthesizer (1, 11), drums (1), drum programming (2, 4, 5, 8, 11), keyboards (2, 4, 5, 7, 8, 11), bass guitar (4); piano, programming (10)
- The Dare – bass guitar (1)
- Jay Franco – mastering assistance (2–4, 6–10)
- Rob Domos – mastering assistance (2–4, 6–10)
- Julia Michaels – additional vocals (2)
- Benny Bock – additional keyboards (3), synthesizer (11)
- Cashmere Cat – drum programming, keyboards, synthesizer (3)
- Pino Palladino – bass guitar (3)
- Billy Walsh – additional vocals (4)
- Rob Moose – strings (5, 6)
- Brad Lauchert – mixing (6, 7, 10)
- Jon Castelli – mixing (6, 7, 10)
- Zac Rae – piano (6)
- Count Baldor – keyboards (7)
- Atlgrandma – bass guitar, drum programming, keyboards, synthesizer, engineering (9)
- Manny Marroquin – mixing (8, 9, 11)
- Francesco Di Giovanni – additional mixing (8, 9, 11)
- Ramiro Fernandez-Seoane – additional mixing (8, 9, 11)

== Charts ==
Chart performance for Prima
Chart (2026)	Peak position
Australian Albums (ARIA)	6
Austrian Albums (Ö3 Austria)	2
Belgian Albums (Ultratop Flanders)	1
Belgian Albums (Ultratop Wallonia)	2
Canadian Albums (Billboard)	6
Croatian International Albums (HDU)	12
Czech Albums (ČNS IFPI)	4
Danish Albums (Hitlisten)	31
Dutch Albums (Album Top 100)	1
Finnish Albums (Suomen virallinen lista)	7
French Albums (SNEP)	37
German Albums (Offizielle Top 100)	6
German Pop Albums (Offizielle Top 100)	3
Hungarian Albums (MAHASZ)	37
Irish Albums (Official Charts)	5
Italian Albums (FIMI)	94
Lithuanian Albums (AGATA)	8
New Zealand Albums (RMNZ)	5
Norwegian Albums (IFPI Norge)	10
Polish Albums (ZPAV)	5
Portuguese Albums (AFP)	13
Scottish Albums (Official Charts)	1
Slovak Albums (ČNS IFPI)	1
Spanish Albums (Promusicae)	21
Swedish Albums (Sverigetopplistan)	9
Swiss Albums (Schweizer Hitparade)	5
UK Albums (Official Charts)	2
US Billboard 200	4
