= KGB (song) =

2026 single by Adéla

Single by Adéla

from the album Prima
- Released: 17 April 2026
- Genre: Dance-pop; electro-pop
- Length: 2:37
- Label: Capitol
- Songwriters: Adéla Jergová; Ali Tamposi; Billy Walsh; Blake Slatkin; Dylan Brady; Harrison Patrick Smith
- Producers: Blake Slatkin; Dylan Brady; The Dare

Adéla singles chronology
"Sex on the Beat" (2025)	"KGB" (2026)	"Red Bottoms" (2026)

Music video
- "KGB" on YouTube

"KGB" is a song by Slovak singer-songwriter Adéla, from her debut studio album Prima (2026). It was released on 17 April 2026 through Capitol Records as the lead single from the album. The song was written by Adéla, Ali Tamposi, and Billy Walsh with its producers Blake Slatkin, Dylan Brady, and The Dare. Its music video was filmed at the historic Los Angeles Theatre.

== Background and release ==
In May 2025, Adéla announced that she had signed with Capitol Records and Polydor Records. She released The Provocateur, her debut extended play (EP), on 22 August 2025. Starting on 8 April 2026, she performed as the opening act for Demi Lovato's It's Not That Deep Tour, during which she performed a number of new tracks including "KGB".

== Composition and lyrics ==
Co-produced by Blake Slatkin, Dylan Brady of 100 Gecs, and the Dare, "KGB" is a "rave-leaning" dance-pop and electro-pop anthem with tech house influences. It combines Brady's cyber-pop punk influence with the Dare's signature snare-heavy production, while Adéla's vocals shift between distorted and high-pitched passages and incorporates talk-singing, rapping, and screaming. Lyrically, she uses the titular KGB, the Soviet Union's secret police agency, as a metaphor for her relentless training and studying to become a popstar. The song describes her upbringing as an immigrant from Slovakia and her work ethic, such as teaching herself English, leveraging the KGB metaphor to underscore her heritage as well as her subversive humour. In an interview with Vanity Fair, Adéla expressed that she chose to release it as a "get-to-know-me track" to introduce audiences to herself, seeking to "create conversation and tell my story and show my sense of humor" without intending it to be a hit single.

== Critical reception ==
Writing for Melodic, August Nguyen praised the song's "bold, confrontational" lyricism and its display of Adéla's "unabashed pop persona". Similarly, Margaret Farrell of Stereogum described it as "provocative and catchy", while José Criales-Unzueta of Vanity Fair deemed it "contentious and bold".

== Music video ==
The music video for "KGB" was released alongside the single and was directed by Rachel Dunkel. A statement at the end explains that the song is not an endorsement of the KGB but an acknowledgement of her background, and reaffirmed her support for the people of Ukraine during the Russo-Ukrainian war. Filmed in the Los Angeles Theatre, the video draws on her extensive professional background as a ballet dancer. In the clip, Adéla plays a dominatrix and dances ballet in a custom-made recreation of the red ballet costume worn by Natalie Portman in Black Swan (2010).

== Track listings ==
Digital download and streaming

1. "KGB" – 2:37

7" vinyl

1. "KGB" – 2:37
2. "KGB" (instrumental) – 2:37

== Charts ==
Chart performance for "KGB"
Chart (2026)	Peak position
New Zealand Hot Singles (RMNZ)	8
Slovakia Airplay (ČNS IFPI)	60
Slovakia Singles Digital (ČNS IFPI)	28
UK Singles Sales (OCC)	59
UK Physical Singles (OCC)	7
US Hot Dance/Pop Songs (Billboard)	9

== Release history ==
Release dates and formats for "KGB"
Region	Date	Format	Label	Ref.
Various	17 April 2026	Digital download; streaming	Capitol	
Various	3 July 2026	7-inch vinyl	Capitol	
