= Nicole Kidman (song) =

2026 single by Adéla

Single by Adéla

from the album Prima
- A-side: "Ain't in LA"
- Released: 4 September 2026
- Length: 3:01
- Label: Capitol
- Songwriters: Adéla Jergová; Blake Slatkin; Dylan Brady; Julia Michaels; Billy Walsh; Anna-Catherine Hartley
- Producers: Blake Slatkin; Dylan Brady

Adéla singles chronology
"Ain't in LA" (2026)	"Nicole Kidman" (2026)

Music video
- "Nicole Kidman" on YouTube

"Nicole Kidman" is a song by the Slovak singer and songwriter Adéla from her debut album, Prima (2026). It was released alongside the album on 4 September 2026 through Capitol Records, as the fourth single. Its music video was released the same day, and the song was sent to US rhythmic radio on October 6. The song's title references Australian and American actress Nicole Kidman.

"Nicole Kidman" charted at number 1 in Greece and Singapore and reached the Top 10 in Australia, Canada, Hong Kong, Ireland, Jamaica, Latvia, Lebanon, Lithuania, Malaysia, New Zealand, Norway, the Philippines, Slovakia, the United Arab Emirates, the United Kingdom, and the United States. It also reached the Top 20 in Austria, Czech Republic, Germany, Iceland, Luxembourg, Portugal, Romania, Sweden, and Thailand. Moreover, the song peaked at number 2 on the Billboard Global 200 chart.

== Music and lyrics ==
"Nicole Kidman" features a sample of "In My Father's House" from the 1986 album Praise Him by God's Gospel Angels. Lyrically, it was inspired by Adéla's attendance at a Golden Globes party in January 2026. While preparing for the event, she "got all glammed up" and wore a corset that she described as "so tight" that she felt like the actress Nicole Kidman. The experience later became a lyric in the song.

On 25 August 2026, Adéla announced the track listing for her debut studio album Prima, which included "Nicole Kidman" as its second track. Following the announcement, Kidman was asked about the song at the premiere of Practical Magic 2 on 26 August. She expressed her support for Adéla and said that she intended to attend the singer's The Red Bottoms Tour concert in Nashville, Tennessee, on 21 September. Kidman later followed this by uploading her first TikTok, using Adéla's song "Ain't in LA" as the video's soundtrack. Later on in an interview on The Tonight Show Starring Jimmy Fallon, Kidman praised Adéla, stating, "I can't believe it, she wrote a song called Nicole Kidman. [...] In her video, she did all the films I've done, half of them I can't even remember, so it was really good seeing it. She's so talented."

== Critical reception ==
Writing for The Sydney Morning Herald, Robert Moran and Barry Divola compared the song's sound to Kanye West's "golden-era chiptune soul", while noting its "handful of tacky references" to Kidman that nevertheless make the track "feel effortlessly fun".

== Music video ==
Directed by Hannah Lux Davis, the music video for "Nicole Kidman" premiered on 4 September 2026, coinciding with the release of Prima. It incorporates references to several of Kidman's film roles, including To Die For (1995), Eyes Wide Shut (1999), Moulin Rouge! (2001), Birth (2004) and Babygirl (2024), alongside imagery associated with her 2021 AMC Theatres advertising campaign. The reference scenes are interspersed with sequences of Adéla dancing in different outfits, in keeping with the song's lyrics. Reviewing the video for Metal, Arnau Salvadó described it as Adéla turning Kidman's "greatest hits into a high-fashion obstacle course", while citing it as an example of "where cinema still has magic". He noted the video's use of "blue lipstick, feathers and considerably more body rolling".

== Commercial performance ==
"Nicole Kidman" reached number 2 on the Billboard Global 200 chart, becoming Adéla's second top-ten song on the chart and the first debut artist to hold two top-five hits in the tier on each ranking alongside "Ain't in LA". In Slovakia, the song debuted at number seven on the Slovakia Singles Digital Top 100, becoming Adéla's second top-ten entry. The song peaked at number five. it debuted at number 45 on the United States' Billboard Hot 100, her second entry on the chart. The song peaked at number six on the chart dated 24 October 2026, becoming the singer's first top-ten entry. In Australia, "Nicole Kidman" reached the top ten alongside "Ain't in LA", peaking at number four on the chart dated 28 September 2026.

== Charts ==
=== Weekly charts ===
Weekly chart performance
Chart (2026)	Peak position
Argentina Hot 100 (Billboard)	55
Australia (ARIA)	3
Australia Airplay (RCS)	26
Austria (Ö3 Austria Top 40)	7
Austria Airplay (MusicTrace)	42
Belarus Airplay (TopHit)	43
Belgium (Billboard)	21
Brazil Hot 100 (Billboard)	55
Canada Hot 100 (Billboard)	5
Canada CHR/Top 40 (Billboard)	30
Chile (Billboard)	23
Chile Airplay (Monitor Latino)	15
Colombia Anglo Airplay (Monitor Latino)	6
CIS Airplay (TopHit)	25
Costa Rica Anglo Airplay (Monitor Latino)	7
Czech Republic Singles Digital (ČNS IFPI)	7
Denmark (Tracklisten)	32
Dominican Republic Anglo Airplay (Monitor Latino)	10
Estonia Airplay (TopHit)	37
Finland (Suomen virallinen lista)	29
France (SNEP)	71
Germany (GfK)	12
Germany Airplay (MusicTrace)	39
Global 200 (Billboard)	2
Greece International (IFPI)	1
Hong Kong (Billboard)	10
Iceland (Billboard)	12
Ireland (IRMA)	6
Israel (Mako Hitlist)	81
Italy (FIMI)	70
Jamaica Airplay (JAMMS)	3
Japan Hot Overseas (Billboard Japan)	6
Kazakhstan Airplay (TopHit)	9
Latvia Airplay (LaIPA)	15
Latvia Streaming (LaIPA)	5
Lebanon (Lebanese Top 20)	5
Lithuania (AGATA)	7
Lithuania Airplay (TopHit)	17
Luxembourg (Billboard)	8
Malaysia (IFPI)	4
Malaysia International (RIM)	3
Mexico Anglo Airplay (Monitor Latino)	2
Moldova Airplay (TopHit)	81
Netherlands (Single Top 100)	33
New Zealand (Recorded Music NZ)	4
New Zealand Airplay (RCS)	5
Norway (VG-lista)	8
Panama Anglo Airplay (Monitor Latino)	13
Panama Streaming (PRODUCE)	21
Peru (Billboard)	9
Philippines (IFPI)	8
Philippines Hot 100 (Billboard Philippines)	8
Poland Streaming (OLiS)	21
Portugal (AFP)	14
Romania (Billboard)	7
Russia Airplay (TopHit)	26
Serbia Airplay (Radiomonitor)	9
Singapore (RIAS)	1
Slovakia Airplay (ČNS IFPI)	12
Slovakia Singles Digital (ČNS IFPI)	3
South Africa (Billboard)	14
South Korea (Circle)	144
Sweden (Sverigetopplistan)	8
Switzerland (Schweizer Hitparade)	4
Taiwan (Billboard)	22
Thailand (Billboard)	16
United Arab Emirates (IFPI)	6
UK Singles (Official Charts)	4
US Billboard Hot 100	6
US Adult Pop Airplay (Billboard)	37
US Pop Airplay (Billboard)	17
US Rhythmic Airplay (Billboard)	7
Venezuela Anglo Airplay (Monitor Latino)	11
Vietnam Hot 100 (Billboard)	63

=== Monthly charts ===
Monthly chart performance
Chart (2026)	Peak position
Estonia Airplay (TopHit)	84
Lithuania Airplay (TopHit)	51
Panama Streaming (PRODUCE)	35

== Certifications ==
Certifications for Nicole Kidman
Region	Certification	Certified units/sales
Canada (Music Canada)	Platinum	80,000^{‡}
New Zealand (RMNZ)	Gold	15,000^{‡}
United Kingdom (BPI)	Silver	200,000^{‡}
Streaming
Slovakia (ČNS IFPI)	Gold	850,000^{†}
^{‡} Sales+streaming figures based on certification alone.^{†} Streaming-only figures based on certification alone.

== Release history ==
Release dates and formats
Region	Date	Format	Label	Ref.
United States	6 October 2026	Rhythmic radio	Capitol	
