= Red Bottoms (song) =

Single by Adéla

from the album Prima
- Released: 12 June 2026
- Length: 3:06
- Label: Capitol
- Songwriters: Adéla; Billy Walsh; Blake Slatkin; Dylan Brady; Julia Michaels
- Producers: Dylan Brady; Bart Schoudel; Blake Slatkin

Adéla singles chronology
"KGB" (2026)	"Red Bottoms" (2026)	"Ain't in LA" (2026)

Music video
- "Red Bottoms" on YouTube

"Red Bottoms" is a song by Slovak singer and songwriter Adéla, from her debut studio album Prima (2026). It was released on 12 June 2026 by Capitol Records as the second single from the album. Titled after Christian Louboutin heels, "Red Bottoms" is a song about being emotionally worn-out and the fear of one's partner not being attracted to them anymore.

== Composition and lyrics ==
Thematically "Red Bottoms" builds upon Adéla's distinctive fashion and visual styling, however lyrically focuses on vulnerability, insecurity, and emotional exhaustion – a dramatic shift from her other work, which is mainly interested in themes such as confidence. The track compares "a budding romance to a pair of Christian Louboutin heels". These heels serve as a metaphor for being emotionally worn-out and the fear of losing one's appeal.

== Reception ==
Talking about the song Larisha Paul from Rolling Stone deemed "Red Bottoms" different from the rest of the album and noted that "Predictable doesn’t really work for [Adéla]." Ranking all 11 tracks on Prima for Billboard, Kyle Denis placed the track on the seventh place and opiniated it landed as a "Tate McRae-esque midtempo cut that reiterated the fact that Adéla is really good at presenting complicated topics through simple phrases and tangible, relatable metaphors."

== Credits ==
Credits adapted from Tidal.

- Adéla Jergová – vocals, songwriting
- Blake Slatkin – guitar, keyboards, synthesizer, drum programming, sound engineering, mixing, vocal production, songwriting
- Dylan Brady – keyboards, drum programming, songwriting, production
- Julia Michaels – songwriting
- Rob Moose – strings
- Ruairí O'Flaherty – mastering
- Serban Ghenea – mixing
- Bart Schoudel – vocal production, vocal recording

== Charts ==
Chart performance for "KGB"
Chart (2026)	Peak position
New Zealand Hot Singles (RMNZ)	18
Slovakia Singles Digital (ČNS IFPI)	32

== Release history ==
Release dates and formats for "Ain't in LA"
Region	Date	Format(s)	Label	Ref.
Various	12 June 2026	Digital download; streaming	Capitol	
