= Blake Slatkin =

American songwriter and record producer

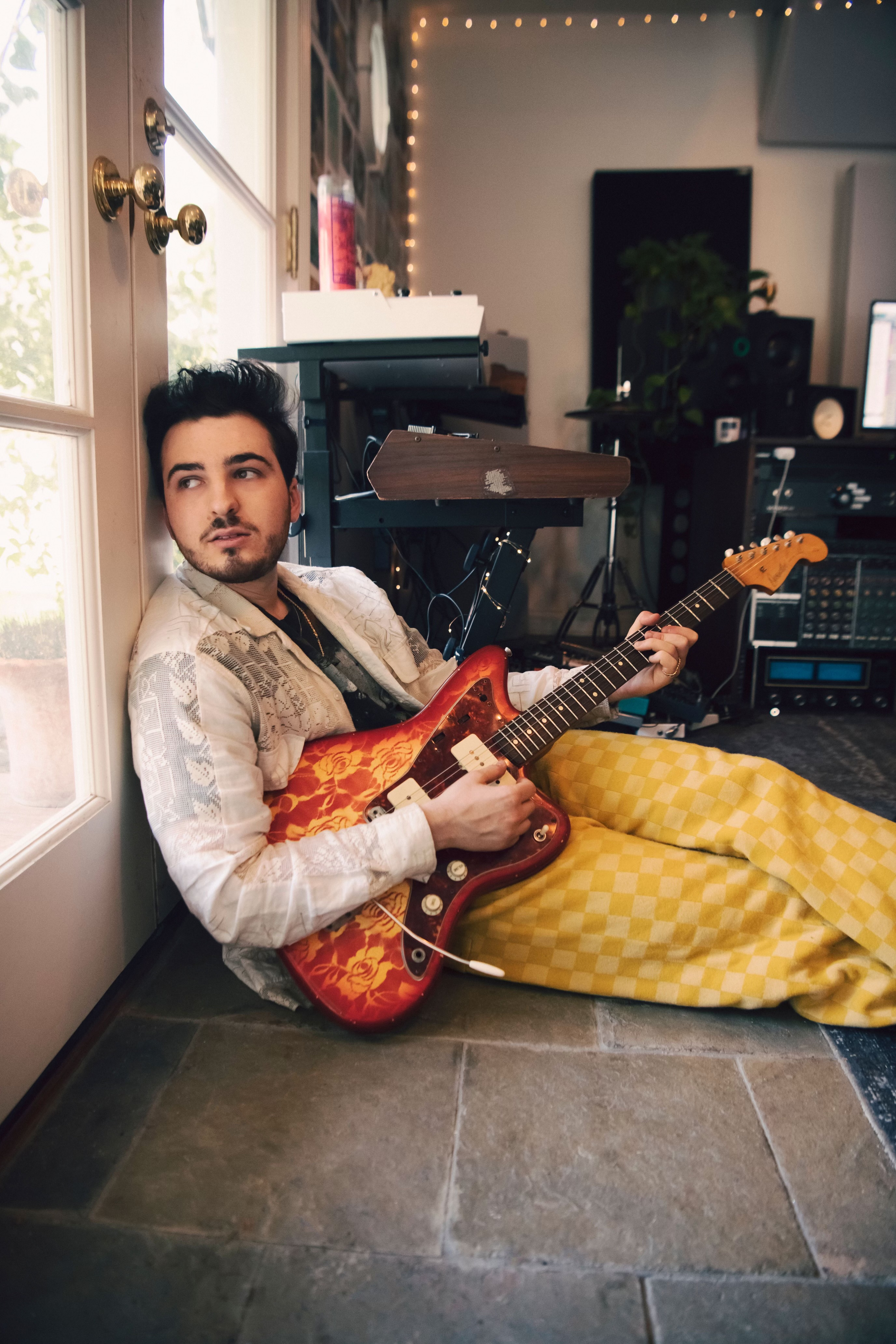
- Slatkin in 2022
- Born: October 16, 1997 (age 29); Los Angeles, California, U.S.
- Education: New York University
- Occupations: Songwriter, record producer

Blake Slatkin (born October 16, 1997) is a Grammy Award winning American record producer and songwriter. He is best known for his work with Justin Bieber, SZA, John Mayer, Adéla, Charli XCX, and Ed Sheeran. Slatkin has produced ten Billboard Hot 100-top ten singles, four of which peaked at number one.

== Career ==
Slatkin was born and raised in Los Angeles, California and began playing guitar at 10 years old. He performed in bands and sang at venues around Los Angeles before discovering a career in production. At 16 he began an internship with producer Benny Blanco before moving to New York City to attend New York University.

As a student at NYU, Slatkin worked with Gracie Abrams and Omar Apollo as a producer and songwriter and served as an executive producer on both of their debut projects. Upon dropping out of NYU, Slatkin relocated to Los Angeles to work in music full time.

Slatkin worked with longtime collaborators The Kid Laroi, Lil Nas X, Omer Fedi, and 24kGoldn during the 2020 COVID-19 pandemic. He had his first No. 1 on the Billboard Hot 100 that year with 24kGoldn's "Mood" feat. Iann Dior. The song topped the chart for eight weeks. That year he also produced "Without You" by The Kid Laroi, followed by The Kid Laroi and Justin Bieber's "Stay", which also peaked at No. 1 on the Billboard Hot 100, along with the Billboard Global 200 and spent seven weeks at the top of the chart, becoming the second longest running song of all-time on the chart as well as spend the most weeks at No. 1 in pop radio history.

Forbes included him in their annual 30 Under 30 List in 2022 and was a Pop Song of the Year honoree at the 2022 BMI Pop Awards for his work on "Mood", and was nominated at the 2022 iHeartRadio Music Awards for Producer of the Year.

At the 65th Annual GRAMMY Awards, Slatkin earned "Record of the Year" for his work on Lizzo's "About Damn Time". In addition, he won awards for Best Remixed Record and best Pop Duo/Group Performance for "Unholy" with Sam Smith and Kim Petras.

== Awards and nominations ==
List of awards and nominations
Award ceremony	Year	Nominee/Work	Category	Result	Ref.
Grammy Awards	2022	Montero (by Lil Nas X)	Album of the Year	Nominated	
Grammy Awards	2023	Special (by Lizzo)	Album of the Year	Nominated	
Grammy Awards	2023	"About Damn Time" (by Lizzo)	Record of the Year	Won	
Grammy Awards	2023	"About Damn Time" (by Lizzo)	Song of the Year	Nominated	
Hollywood Music in Media Awards	2025	"Zoo" (from Zootopia 2)	Best Original Song in an Animated Film	Nominated	
Hollywood Music in Media Awards	2025	"Drive" (from F1)	Best Original Song in a Feature Film	Nominated	
iHeartRadio Music Awards	2022	Himself	Producer of the Year	Nominated	

== Production discography ==
Year	Title	Artist	Album	Songwriting	Producing
2018	"Ignorin"	Omar Apollo	Stereo	check	
2018	"Erase"	Omar Apollo	Stereo	check	check
2018	"Heart"	Omar Apollo	Stereo	check	check
2018	"Six Speed"	Role Model	Non-album single	check	check
2019	"Ashamed"	Omar Apollo	Friends	check	check
2019	"There For Me (Interlude)"	Omar Apollo	Friends	check	check
2019	"So Good"	Omar Apollo	Friends		check
2019	"Trouble"	Omar Apollo	Friends	check	check
2019	"Facts"	Kevin Gates	I'm Him	check	check
2019	"Mean It"	Gracie Abrams	Non-album single	check	check
2019	"Chip On My Shoulder"	Rod Wave	Ghetto Gospel	check	check
2020	"Bad Energy"	Juice Wrld	Legends Never Die	check	check
2020	"Clear Bones"	Jean Dawson	Pixel Bath	check	check
2020	"Friend"	Gracie Abrams	Minor	check	check
2020	"Under / Over"	Gracie Abrams	Minor	check	check
2020	"Tehe"	Gracie Abrams	Minor	check	check
2020	"I Miss You, I'm Sorry"	Gracie Abrams	Minor		check
2020	"Long Sleeves"	Gracie Abrams	Minor	check	check
2020	"Minor"	Gracie Abrams	Minor	check	check
2020	"Miss Me"	Lil Tecca	Virgo World	check	check
2020	"The Bakery"	Melanie Martinez	After School	check	check
2020	"I'm Amazing"	Omar Apollo	Apolonio	check	check
2020	"Without You"	The Kid Laroi	F*ck Love (Savage)	check	check
2020	"Brush Fire"	Gracie Abrams	Non-album single	check	check
2021	"Unlearn" (with Gracie Abrams)	Benny Blanco	Friends Keep Secrets 2	check	check
2021	"You" (with Marshmello and Vance Joy)	Benny Blanco	Friends Keep Secrets 2	check	check
2021	"Care" (with Omar Apollo)	Benny Blanco	Friends Keep Secrets 2	check	check
2021	"Company" (featuring Future)	24kGoldn	El Dorado	check	check
2021	"Outta Pocket"	24kGoldn	El Dorado	check	check
2021	"Butterflies"	24kGoldn	El Dorado	check	check
2021	"Breath Away"	24kGoldn	El Dorado	check	check
2021	"Yellow Lights"	24kGoldn	El Dorado	check	check
2021	"3, 2, 1"	24kGoldn	El Dorado	check	check
2021	"Empty" (featuring Swae Lee)	24kGoldn	El Dorado	check	check
2021	"Cut It Off"	24kGoldn	El Dorado	check	check
2021	"Mood" (featuring Iann Dior)	24kGoldn	El Dorado	check	check
2021	"Mess It Up"	Gracie Abrams	Non-album single	check	check
2021	"Stay" (with Justin Bieber)	The Kid Laroi	F*ck Love 3: Over You	check	check
2021	"Don't Leave" (featuring G Herbo and Lil Durk)	The Kid Laroi	F*ck Love 3: Over You	check	
2021	"Thats What I Want"	Lil Nas X	Montero	check	check
2021	"Sun Goes Down"	Lil Nas X	Montero	check	
2021	"Feels Like"	Gracie Abrams	This Is What It Feels Like	check	check
2021	"Camden"	Gracie Abrams	This Is What It Feels Like		check
2021	"The Bottom"	Gracie Abrams	This Is What It Feels Like	check	check
2021	"Older"	Gracie Abrams	This Is What It Feels Like		check
2021	"Painkillers"	Gracie Abrams	This Is What It Feels Like		check
2021	"Alright"	Gracie Abrams	This Is What It Feels Like	check	check
2021	"Doom"	Juice Wrld	Fighting Demons	check	
2022	"What Would You Do?"	Tate McRae	I Used to Think I Could Fly	check	check
2022	"Hate Myself"	Tate McRae	I Used to Think I Could Fly	check	check
2022	"About Damn Time"	Lizzo	Special	check	check
2022	"Grrrls"	Lizzo	Special	check	check
2022	"I Love You Bitch"	Lizzo	Special	check	check
2022	"Bad Decisions"	Benny Blanco, BTS, and Snoop Dogg	Non-album single	check	check
2022	"Too Well"	Reneé Rapp	Everything to Everyone	check	check
2022	"What Can I Do"	Reneé Rapp	Everything to Everyone	check	check
2022	"Special"	SZA	SOS	check	check
2023	"I Can't Go Back to the Way It Was (Intro)"	The Kid Laroi	Non-album single	check	check
2023	"Lose You"	Sam Smith	Gloria	check	check
2023	"Unholy" (with Kim Petras)	Sam Smith	Gloria	check	check
2023	"How to Cry"	Sam Smith	Gloria	check	check
2023	"Happy"	Kesha	Gag Order	check	
2023	"Pretty Girl"	Ice Spice & Rema	Non-album single	check	check
2023	"Too Much"	The Kid Laroi, Central Cee, Jungkook	The First Time	check	check
2023	"What Just Happened"	The Kid Laroi	The First Time	check	check
2023	"Bleed"	The Kid Laroi	The First Time	check	check
2023	"Where Do You Sleep?"	The Kid Laroi	The First Time	check	check
2023	"You"	The Kid Laroi	The First Time	check	check
2023	"Call Me Instead" (featuring YoungBoy Never Broke Again)	The Kid Laroi	The First Time	check	check
2024	"J Christ"	Lil Nas X	TBD	check	
2024	"Where Do We Go Now?"	Lil Nas X	TBD	check	check
2024	"Heaven"	The Kid Laroi	The First Time (Deluxe Version)	check	check
2024	"Calling After Me"	Wallows	Model	check	check
2024	"Spite"	Omar Apollo	God Said No	check	check
2024	"360"	Charli xcx	Brat	check	
2024	"365"	Charli xcx	Brat	check	
2024	"360" (featuring Robyn and Yung Lean)	Charli xcx	Brat and It's Completely Different but Also Still Brat	check	
2024	"Dispose of Me"	Omar Apollo	God Said No	check	check
2024	"Be Careful With Me"	Omar Apollo	God Said No	check	check
2024	"Done With You"	Omar Apollo	God Said No	check	check
2024	"Empty"	Omar Apollo	God Said No	check	check
2024	"How"	Omar Apollo	God Said No	check	check
2024	"Touch"	KATSEYE	SIS (Soft is Strong)	check	check
2024	"Til The Morning"	Royel Otis	PRATTS & PAIN		check
2024	"Drinks or Coffee"	Rosé	Rosie	check	
2024	"BMF"	SZA	LANA	check	check
2025	"Miss possessive"	Tate McRae	So Close To What	check	check
2025	"Don't Wanna Cry"	Selena Gomez & benny blanco	I Said I Love You First...	check	check
2025	"Don't Take It Personally"	Selena Gomez & benny blanco	I Said I Love You First...	check	check
2025	"Old Phone"	Ed Sheeran	Play	check	check
2025	"moody"	Royel Otis	Hickey	check	check
2025	"WHY"	Jon Bellion & Luke Combs	FATHER FIGURE	check	check
2025	"Drive"	Ed Sheeran	F1 The Album	check	check
2025	"Car"	Royel Otis	Hickey	check	check
2025	"A Little More"	Ed Sheeran	Play	check	check
2025	"shut up"	Royel Otis	Hickey	check	check
2025	"i hate this tune"	Royel Otis	Hickey	check	check
2025	"who's your boyfriend"	Royel Otis	Hickey	check	check
2025	"i hate this tune"	Royel Otis	Hickey	check	check
2025	"jazz burger"	Royel Otis	Hickey	check	check
2025	"FinallyApologizing"	Adéla	The Provocateur	check	check
2025	"Slowly"	Ed Sheeran	Play	check	check
2025	"For Always"	Ed Sheeran	Play	check	check
2025	"The Vow"	Ed Sheeran	Play	check	check
2025	"Opening"	Ed Sheeran	Play	check	check
2025	"In Other Words"	Ed Sheeran	Play	check	check
2025	"Zoo"	Shakira	Zootopia 2	check	check
2025	"Die on This Hill"	Sienna Spiro	Visitor		check
2026	"Breathe"	Malcolm Todd	Do That Again	check	check
2026	"KGB"	Adéla	Prima	check	check
2026	"I Saw Your Face"	Malcolm Todd	Do That Again	check	check
2026	"Red Bottoms"	Adéla	Prima	check	check
2026	"Pure"	Sienna Spiro	Visitor		check
2026	"Animal"	Katseye	Wild	check	check
2026	"Ain't In LA"	Adéla	Prima	check	check
2026	"Nicole Kidman"	Adéla	Prima	check	check
2026	"I'm The Man"	Adéla	Prima	check	check
2026	"Boys"	Adéla	Prima	check	check
2026	"Hitachi"	Adéla	Prima	check	check
2026	"Fantasize"	Adéla	Prima	check	check
2026	"Starving Artist"	Adéla	Prima	check	check
2026	"Marijuana"	Adéla	Prima	check	check
2026	"Therapy"	Adéla	Prima	check	check
2026	“Tom and Jerry”	John Mayer	Tom and Jerry - Single		
