= The Dare (musician) =

American singer (born 1996)

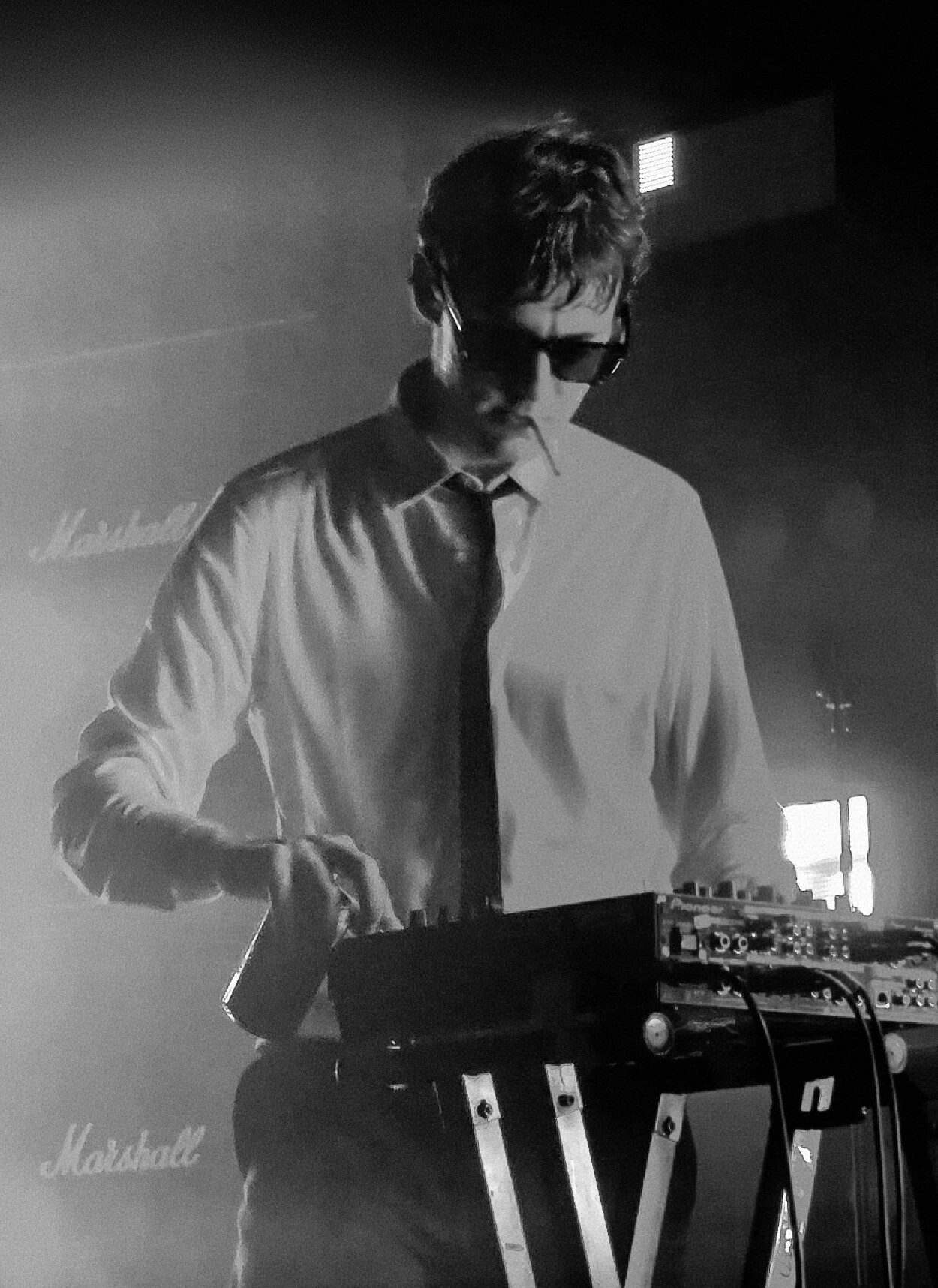
- The Dare performing in Sydney, 2024

Background information
- Also known as: Turtlenecked
- Born: Harrison Patrick Smith; March 19, 1996 (age 30); West Hollywood, California, U.S.
- Genres: Dance-punk; electroclash; electropop; new rave; indie rock
- Years active: 2015–present
- Labels: Republic; Polydor

Harrison Patrick Smith (born March 19, 1996), known professionally as The Dare and formerly as Turtlenecked, is an American singer and musician. He is best known for his single "Girls", released in August 2022, and for producing the song "Guess" by Charli XCX from the deluxe version of her 2024 album Brat.

After performing indie music as Turtlenecked in the Pacific Northwest, Smith moved to New York City and began writing songs as the Dare. Following the releases of the singles "Girls" and "Good Time", Smith signed with Republic Records and on May 19, 2023, released The Sex EP to mixed reviews. In 2024, he released What's Wrong with New York?, his debut studio album as the Dare, to largely positive reviews.

The Dare is associated with the indie sleaze revival (Note: Attributed to multiple references:) and Dimes Square. He has also produced music for artists such as Adéla, PinkPantheress, and MØ.

== Early life ==
Harrison Patrick Smith was born in West Hollywood, California, and grew up in Woodinville, a suburb of Seattle. His mother is a psychotherapist, and his late father was a medical devices salesman. As a child, he played violin and guitar and read about fashion. He later moved to Portland, Oregon to attend Lewis & Clark College, where he studied English literature.

== Career ==
=== Turtlenecked ===
In 2014, while attending Lewis & Clark College, Smith formed a musical project called Turtlenecked, which developed a cult following in the Pacific Northwest. His debut album, Pure Plush Bone Cage, was released in August 2016. Pitchfork's Ian Cohen rated their second album, Vulture (2017), a 6.0/10, saying that Smith is "capable of penning voice-of-a-generation quotables" while also criticizing some of his lyricism as "insufferable". On February 3, 2018, Turtlenecked, featuring a blonde Harrison, performed a full live session on KEXP hosted by DJ Sharlese. During the session, Smith performed the following songs, “Pangloss,” “Lies,” “The Whip,” and “Starry Night.”

On April 27, 2018, the group released an EP, High Scores of the Heart, which NPR's Jerad Walker praised for being "so polished that you might be surprised to find out that he is still just an undergrad." Smith moved to New York City in 2017, where he continued performing with Turtlenecked. He also worked as a waiter and guitar teacher in the area.

After COVID-19 pandemic restrictions eased, Smith resumed performing gigs with Turtlenecked. Until December 2022, Smith worked as a substitute teacher at a private school in the West Village neighborhood of New York City. He moonlighted as a DJ, hosting a semi-weekly party called Freakquencies at the Lower East Side dive bar Home Sweet Home, and hosted afterparties for fashion brands Celine and Gucci. In 2020, Smith released his final projects as Turtlenecked, the album Kapow! and the EP Cherish.

=== The Dare ===
During the pandemic, Smith created self-described "goofy" songs to send to his friends. One night, inspired by the Rolling Stones album Some Girls, Smith created the song "Girls", which would become his first single as the Dare. He played it at Turtlenecked shows, and noticed that the crowd received it well even though it was more frenetic and thematically light than the indie music he typically made. Smith officially released the song in August 2022, calling it "a rejection of the last five years of music" which he felt had become overly serious. Jon Caramanica of The New York Times named "Girls" as the fifth best song of 2022, calling it "[e]pically silly and epically debauched".

In March 2023, Smith released a second single, "Good Time". The next month, after a bidding war with several major labels, Smith was signed with Republic Records. The Sex EP, Smith's first EP as the Dare, was released May 19, 2023, to mixed reviews. In June 2023, it was announced that the Dare would join the U.S. west coast leg of artist Yves Tumor's international tour.

He announced his latest single, "Perfume," in an interview with Animal Blood Magazine.

In June 2024, the Dare joined Charli XCX as the opening act of her three-date North American tour in support of Brat. In August the remix of Charli XCX's song "Guess", featuring Billie Eilish and produced by the Dare alongside Finneas, debuted at number one on the UK Singles Chart.

The Dare's debut studio album, What's Wrong with New York?, was released on September 6, 2024, via Republic and Polydor Records to positive reviews. In December 2024, he performed 3 sold-out shows across Sydney and Melbourne. During the visit he brought his club night freakquencies to Melbourne for the first time, taking over Miscellania.

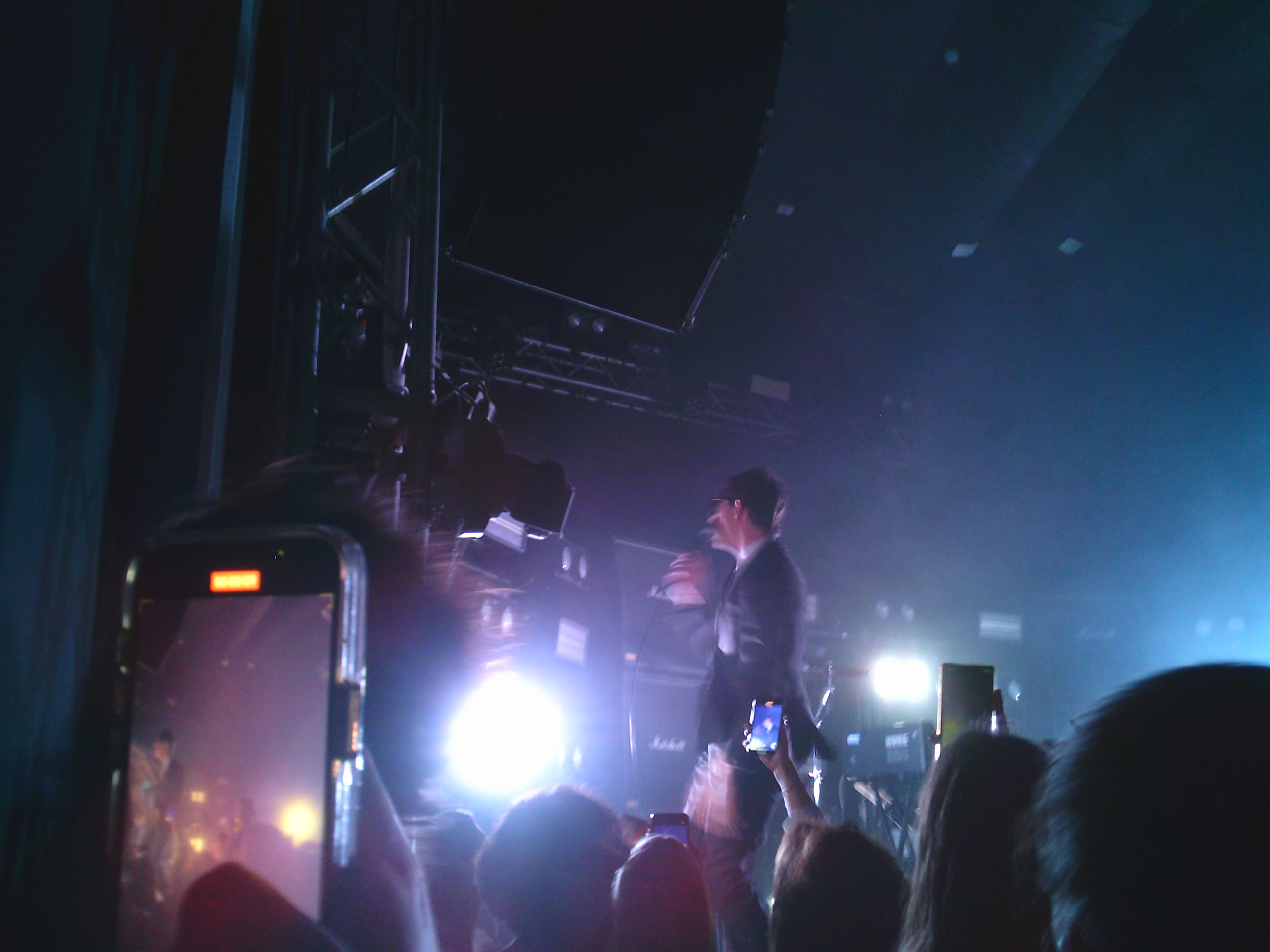
The Dare at his Milan show, March 2025

The Dare subsequently toured in Europe in March 2025, performing to sold-out audiences at venues including Melkweg in Amsterdam, Le Trianon in Paris, Santeria Toscana 31 in Milan, Marble Factory in Bristol, Vicar Street in Dublin, New Century Hall in Manchester and Queen Margaret Union in Glasgow. In April 2025, the Dare performed at Coachella. He later appeared at Primavera Sound in June, followed by August performances at Lollapalooza and the Reading and Leeds Festival. In October, he also performed at Austin City Limits Music Festival. Outside the festival circuit, the Dare DJed a Studio 54–inspired party hosted by Valentino Beauty on September 10. Also in 2025, the Dare released Freakquencies: Volume 1, a four-track project inspired by his club night of the same name, and co-produced Stateside with PinkPantheress.

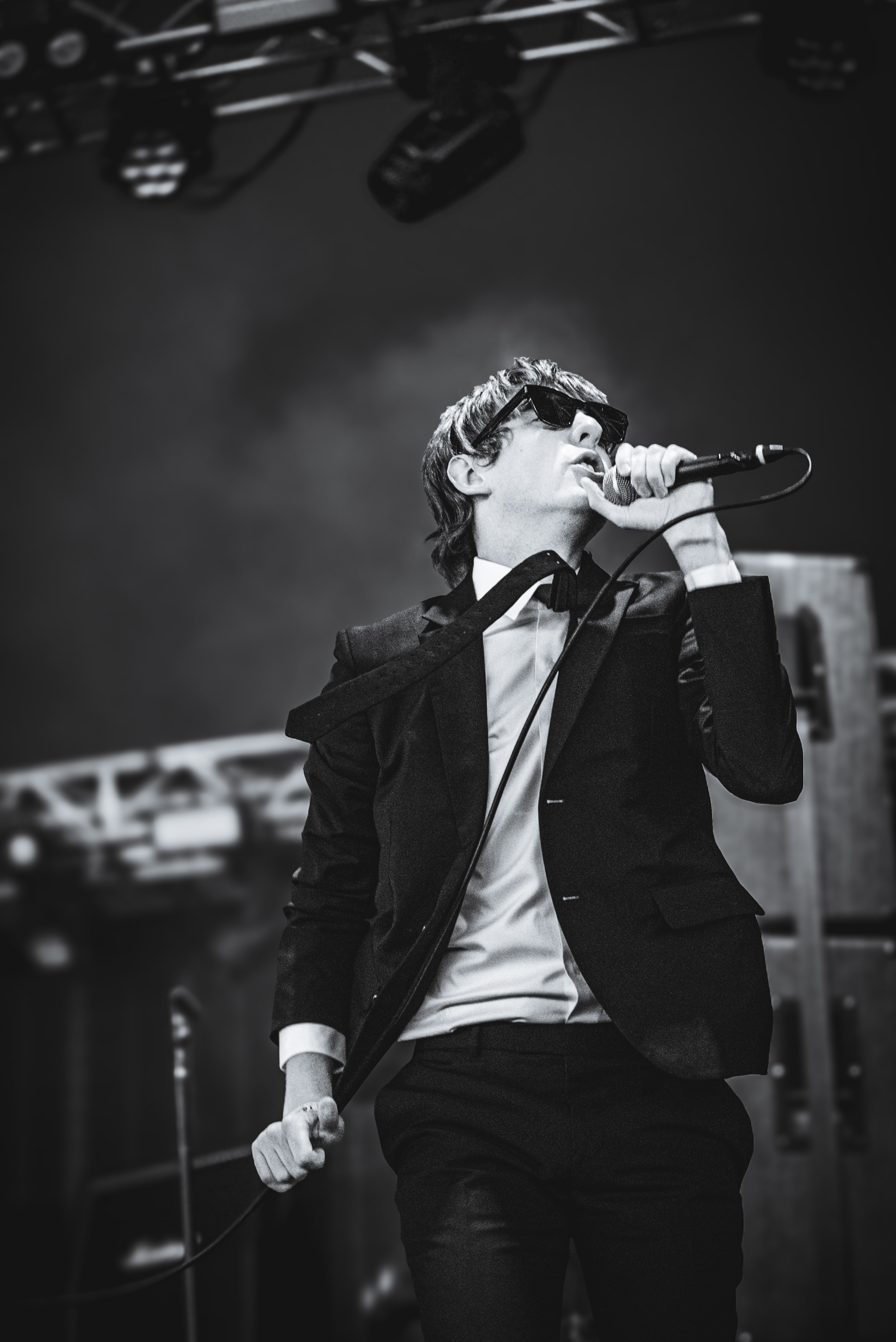
The Dare performing in Melbourne, 2026.

On January 27, 2026, he performed a DJ set at the Whitney Museum's Art Party. In February 2026, the Dare performed at the Laneway Festival in Australia and New Zealand. Alongside the Laneway Festival, the Dare brought his freakquencies club night to Sydney and Melbourne, featuring DJ sets from Geese and Wet Leg. At the Perth Laneway Festival, he performed his remix of Wet Leg's "Mangetout" with Rhian Teasdale. In March 2026, the Dare attended the Saint Laurent Fall/Winter 2026–2027 Fashion Show during Paris Fashion Week.

He voiced the character Harrison, radio host of Stockyard FM, in the 2026 video game Grand Theft Auto VI.

== Reception ==
English singer Charli XCX praised "Girls" in a 2022 interview, saying it "goes off at parties"; the two later collaborated on "Guess" for the deluxe edition of her 2024 album Brat. The Dare later performed as the opening act for the Brooklyn date of Charli XCX's Brat tour in June 2024. His musical style has frequently been compared to LCD Soundsystem, (Note: Attributed to multiple references:) the Rapture, (Note: Attributed to multiple references:) and Peaches. (Note: Attributed to multiple references:)

In a critical review in Pitchfork, Sophie Kemp compared the Dare to LMFAO and claimed his schtick "looks better on a T-shirt than in a song, where its snarkiness is a little exhausting".

== Personal life ==
As of July 2023, Smith lived in an apartment in East Williamsburg, Brooklyn. In a profile for GQ, Samuel Hine described him as "a little shy", unlike his stage persona. Smith calls himself a "huge music nerd" and said he struggled with anxiety and hypochondria when he moved to New York City.

== Discography ==
As the Dare

- The Sex EP (2023)
- What's Wrong with New York? (2024)
- What’s Wrong with New York?: Afters (2025)
- Freakquencies: Volume 1 (2025)

As Turtlenecked

- Twisted Legs (2015)
- The Romantics (2015)
- Sub-Reptilian Ennui (2016)
- Swish (2016)
- Pure Plush Bone Cage (2016)
- Caveat (2016)
- Boys Club (2016)
- Vulture (2017)
- High Scores of the Heart (2018)
- Springtime in Hell (2018)
- Kapow (2020)
- Cherish (2020)
