= Adéla =

Slovak singer, songwriter and dancer (born 2003)

- Adéla performing in 2026

Background information
- Born: Adéla Jergová; 27 November 2003 (age 22); Bratislava, Slovakia
- Genre: Pop
- Occupations: Singer; songwriter; dancer
- Instrument: Vocals
- Works: Discography
- Years active: 2023–present
- Label: Capitol
- Website: adelaxo.com

Adéla Jergová (born 27 November 2003) is a Slovak singer, songwriter, and dancer. After training as a ballet dancer in her youth, she pivoted to pop music, competing in the talent competition reality show Dream Academy in 2023 and releasing her debut extended play (EP) The Provocateur in 2025. She then supported Demi Lovato on her It's Not That Deep Tour. Her debut studio album Prima (2026) and its singles "Ain't in LA" and "Nicole Kidman" entered the UK and US charts, with Prima additionally reaching number one in the Netherlands and Belgium and entering the top ten in several other countries.

== Biography ==
Adéla Jergová was born on 27 November 2003 in Bratislava, and has an older brother and younger sister. Their parents are a landscape designer and an IVF clinic owner. Adéla began taking ballet lessons at age three while living in Moscow and later studied at Bratislava's Eva Jaczová Conservatory; she turned professional at age eleven. After performing the main role in The Nutcracker at the Slovak National Theatre for two years from twelve and playing a firefly in the Slovak film Spievankovo a kráľovná Harmónia in 2017, Adéla moved to Vienna on her own to join the Vienna State Ballet at fourteen, to London to join the English National Ballet School at fifteen, and then back home due to the COVID-19 pandemic in the United Kingdom, where she pursued music at a friend's suggestion. She then enrolled in a college marketing course and spent the rest of the COVID-19 pandemic taking vocal lessons via Zoom.

In 2021, after reading an Elle piece about Olivia Rodrigo and her long-term vocal coach Jennifer Dustman, she contacted the latter and began working with her remotely. At her suggestion, she applied for Dream Academy, a programme by the joint venture Hybe x Geffen that received over 120,000 applications. After clearing three rounds via self-tapes and Zoom, she reached the final round, for which the label flew her to Los Angeles to spend two years training. An immediate standout, internal evaluations frequently featured Adéla in the top four for both dance and overall performance.

More than a year in, Hybe x Geffen put the final twenty contestants against each other as part of a televised competition for spots in a band that later became Katseye. Adéla came in joint last following a fan vote after a group performance of Blackpink's "Pink Venom" during the show's first elimination mission, following which Hybe x Geffen president Mitra Darab said that she had come across more as a solo artist during training and development. Dream Academy featured in Netflix's 2024 behind-the-scenes docuseries Pop Star Academy: Katseye, in which Adéla was depicted comforting a contestant who had been eliminated during the final ten, tearfully instructing the other hopefuls that they did not need the competition and were "great" on their own, and criticising one contestant for their work ethic. The last of these led her to be labelled a "mean girl" by many viewers, although some defended her comments as appropriate for the programme. She briefly returned to Slovakia for visa reasons after being eliminated, but returned to Los Angeles to work with vocal coach Dave Stroud and to take music classes at Santa Monica College, the latter at the insistence of her parents.

Adéla performing at Brooklyn Steel in 2026

Adéla went through an indie rock phase after filming Dream Academy but had returned to making pop in time for her debut release, which coincided with that of Pop Star Academy. Her first two singles, "Homewrecked" and "Superscar", were released in September and October 2024 and respectively brought Adéla to the attention of Grimes and Capitol Records; the former co-produced Adéla's February 2025 single "Machine Girl" and appeared in its video with Sofia Wylie. Capitol signed Adéla in May. After releasing "DeathByDevotion" in July, she included it and her previous singles on her August EP The Provocateur, which received positive critical reception and was shortlisted for an Anděl Award. The EP featured as its cover Adéla pulling up her dress to urinate against an underpass wall and was promoted with The ProvocaTour and with a music video for "SexOnTheBeat" featuring a nude Adéla and a cameo appearance from Christina Aguilera.

In April 2026, she began a month of shows as the support act for Demi Lovato's It's Not That Deep Tour and released the single "KGB"; the latter was named after the Soviet Union watchdog of the same name. She followed the pair with "Red Bottoms" in June and "Ain't in LA" in July; the latter featured uncredited vocals from Theron Thomas and charted at numbers 12 and 24 on the UK singles chart and the Billboard Hot 100. Her September 2026 album Prima, which included her three previous singles and "Nicole Kidman", topped the charts in the Netherlands and Belgium, peaked at numbers two, two, and four in the UK, Australia, and the US, and entered the top ten of several other countries' charts. "Nicole Kidman" was named after the actress of the same name and peaked at numbers four and six in the UK and US. Named after "prima ballerina", the highest rank a woman can attain in ballet, Prima was promoted with The Red Bottoms Tour, an appearance on Elton John's Rocket Hour, and with performances of "Ain't in LA" and "Nicole Kidman" on The Tonight Show Starring Jimmy Fallon.

== Artistry and personal life ==
"As a kid I became enamored by the divas: Whitney, Céline, Patti, Aretha, Mariah. I wanted to study them and be able to belt "I Have Nothing" one day. Then came my obsession with harmonies and vocal production, that’s my favorite part of the process now. Being raised by queens of harmonies like Beyoncé and Ariana as well as Imogen Heap, I became obsessed. [...] I think songwriting came later in life to help in times when my feelings became too complicated to talk about. Around 14 is when I started writing songs on my piano in my room."

— Adéla in 2024

Adéla typically cites inspiration from successful female artists such as Britney Spears, Christina Aguilera, Lady Gaga, Chappell Roan, and especially Beyoncé and Ariana Grande. She said in August 2026 that she was not interested in male pop stars beyond Michael Jackson and Prince and that her music videos were inspired by Janet Jackson's "Rock with U", Lady Gaga's "Bad Romance", and Beyoncé's Lemonade. Upon the release of The Provocateur, several outlets suggested that its cover was a homage to Sophy Rickett's Women Pissing. Adéla has also said that she was inspired to become a singer after watching the American teen sitcom Hannah Montana, that "Red Bottoms" was inspired by a worn-out pair of Louboutins, that "Ain't in LA" was inspired by photos of her then-eighteen-year-old mother posing in front of a wall of smuggled pop culture posters, and that "Nicole Kidman" was inspired by the effect of a corset on her breasts.

Her works normally comprise pop music, although her earlier works incorporated elements of dark electronica and diaristic lyrics; much of The Provocateur addressed the cynicism of the music industry. Prima was found by a The Guardian reviewer to "frequently evoke the 00s", while an October 2026 Vogue piece described The Provocateur as electroclash and wrote that the opening concert of Red Bottoms Tour contained "peak-Britney choreo for the bangers, peak-[Christina Aguilera] vocals on the ballads, [and] cheeky foul-mouthed banter". Her music frequently addresses sex; "SexOnTheBeat" contains orgasms, while "Starving Artist", "Marijuana", and "Hitachi" from Prima respectively spoke of sex with an ex-boyfriend, drug-fuelled sex in a car, and a potential threesome. "Hitachi" was named after the brand of her vibrator. She has said that sexual expression came naturally to her and that Dream Academy had asked her to tone it down.

Adéla taught herself English when she was eight by watching American television series and interviews with American singers. Her signature is her pink hair; born honey blonde, she experimented with lighter pinks around the time of "Homewrecked" before going neon pink in March 2026 and hot pink in August. In 2025, she began dating Jackson Shanks, who had co-produced Anotr's "Talk to You" and Le Sserafim's "Hot". Adéla criticised a social media user who had torn down a poster for Rachel Chinouriri's I Think I Spoke Too Soon in order to stand in front of an "Ain't in LA" advertisement in October 2026. She has criticised the administration of Donald Trump for using "Nicole Kidman" in a pro-MAGA social media post in November 2026, and said that if she could, she would vote for a party that liked immigrants and that believed in affordable and safe abortions.

== Discography ==
- Prima (2026)

== Filmography ==
=== Film ===
Year	Title	Role	Ref.
2017	Spievankovo a kráľovná Harmónia	Firefly	

=== Television ===
Year	Title	Role	Ref.
2023	Dream Academy	Self	
2024	Pop Star Academy: Katseye	Self	

== Tours ==
- The ProvocaTour (2025)
- It's Not That Deep Tour (2026, supporting Demi Lovato)
- The Red Bottoms Tour (2026–2027) (Note: Multiple sources wrongly claim that The Red Bottoms Tour is Adéla's first headlining tour.)

== Awards and nominations ==
Name of the award ceremony, year presented, category, nominee(s) of the award, and the result of the nomination
Award	Year	Category	Nominee(s)	Result	Ref.
Anděl Awards	2025	Slovak album	The Provocateur	Shortlisted	
BreakTudo Awards	2026	International Revelation	Herself	Pending	
Grindr Unwrapped Awards	2026	Mother in Training	Herself	Pending	
Grindr Unwrapped Awards	2026	Album of the Year	Prima	Pending	
Grindr Unwrapped Awards	2026	Song of the Year	"Nicole Kidman"	Pending	
Los 40 Music Awards	2026	Best International Song	"Ain't in LA"	Nominated	
Los 40 Music Awards	2026	Best New Artist	Herself	Nominated	
Nickelodeon Kids' Choice Awards	2026	Favorite Female Breakout Artist/Group	Herself	Nominated	
UK Music Video Awards	2026	Best Choreography in a Video	"KGB"	Nominated	
UK Music Video Awards	2026	Best Styling in a Video	"KGB"	Nominated	
SOZA Awards	2026	Most Successful Young Author Under 25	Herself	Nominated	
