= The Provocateur =

EP by Adéla
- Released: 22 August 2025
- Genres: Pop; electropop; hyperpop; dance-pop; house; electronic; industrial
- Length: 19:57
- Label: Capitol
- Producers: Adéla; Riley Aki; Dylan Brady; Liam Benayon; Grimes; Grant Knoche; Dylan Harrison Lubin; Slush Puppy; Blake Slatkin; Y2K; Zhoné

Adéla chronology
The Provocateur (2025)	Prima (2026)

Singles from The Provocateur
- 1. "Homewrecked" Released: 13 September 2024; 2. "Superscar" Released: 25 October 2024; 3. "MachineGirl" Released: 28 February 2025; 4. "DeathByDevotion" Released: 11 July 2025; 5. "SexOnTheBeat" Released: 17 October 2025

The Provocateur is the debut extended play (EP) by Slovak singer-songwriter Adéla. It was released by Capitol Records on 22 August 2025.

== Background and release ==
After competing and being eliminated in the 2023 Hybe and Geffen Records reality competition series Dream Academy alongside 19 other girls and appearing in the Netflix documentary Pop Star Academy: Katseye, Adéla began a career as a solo artist. On 13 September 2024, she released her debut single "Homewrecked," On 25 October 2024, she released her second single, "Superscar." Ones to Watch describes the song as "deliciously catchy" with an "intoxicating pop beat." On 28 February 2025, Adéla released "Machine Girl," a Grimes-produced pop track. On 11 July 2025, she released "Death by Devotion" and announced the release date for the EP. On 13 August 2025, she announced she was pushing the release date from 15 August to 22 August to add an additional track to the EP.

On August 22, the EP was released alongside a music video for "Sex on the Beat" (stylized as "SexOnTheBeat"). Its cover art, which depicts Adéla urinating in the street, was described by Vogue and Harper's Bazaar as seeming to pay homage to Sophy Rickett's "Pissing Women" photography series. 7" vinyl records were released for singles "Sex on the Beat" and "Superscar", and the EP was released on CD in October 2025 and vinyl in June 2026. To promote the EP, Adéla embarked on The ProvocaTour in October 2025.

== Track listing ==
The Provocateur track listing
No.	Title	Writer(s)	Producer(s)	Length
1.	"Superscar"	Adéla Jergová; Grant Knoche; Becca Kruger; Liam Benayon	Knoche	3:14
2.	"SexOnTheBeat"	Jergová; Benayon; Alex Chapman; Brett McLaughlin; Kevin Hickey	Zhone	2:46
3.	"MachineGirl"	Jergová; Benayon; Dylan Harrison Lubin; Grimes; Sam Catalano	Harrison Lubin; Grimes; Benayon; Slush Puppy	2:36
4.	"Homewrecked"	Jergová; Benayon	Jergová; Benayon; Harrison Lubin; Riley Aki	2:54
5.	"Go"	Jergová; Ari Starace; Donna Missal; Dylan Brady	Brady; Y2K	2:45
6.	"DeathByDevotion"	Jergová; McLaughlin; Brady; Hickey; Benayon	Brady; Benayon; Zhone	3:16
7.	"FinallyApologizing"	Jergová; Brady; Blake Slatkin; Lucy Healey	Brady; Slatkin	2:21
Total length:				19:57

Notes:

- All titles are stylised in Camel case.

Credits adapted from Tidal.

== Personnel ==
Musicians

- Adéla – vocals (all tracks), vocal programming (track 1), background vocals (track 3), engineering (track 4)
- Alex Chapman – background vocals (track 2)
- Zhone – drums, keyboard, mixing (track 2), programming, engineering (tracks 2, 6), vocal production (track 6)
- Grimes – background vocals (track 3)
- Y2K – bass, keyboard, percussion, programming, engineering, vocal production (track 5)
- Dylan Brady – bass, percussion (track 5), keyboard (tracks 5, 7), programming (tracks 5, 6), vocal production (tracks 5,6), engineering (track 6)
- Blake Slatkin – keyboard, synthesizer (track 7)
- Lucy Healey – electric piano (track 7)

Technical

- Jack Kennedy – mastering (track 1)
- Nico Fabito – mixing (tracks 1, 3–4), mastering (track 4)
- Grant Knoche – programming, engineering (track 1)
- Dale Becker – mastering (tracks 2–3, 5–7)
- Sam Catalano – programming, engineering (track 3)
- Liam Benayon – engineering (tracks 3–4), programming (track 4)
- Dylan Harrison Lubin – programmer (track 4)
- Geoff Swan– mixing (track 5–6), engineering (track 7)
- Matt Cahill – mixing (track 7)

== Release history ==
Release dates and formats for The Provocateur
Region	Date	Format	Label	Ref.
Various	22 August 2025	Digital download; streaming	Capitol	
Various	17 October 2025	CD	Capitol	
Various	15 June 2026	12" vinyl	Capitol	
