= Sunkist =

Sunkist or Sun Kiss may refer to:

- Sunkist (soft drink), a brand of carbonated soft drink made under license from Sunkist Growers, Inc.
- Sunkist Growers, Incorporated, a citrus growers cooperative
- Sunkist Kids, an American wrestling club
- Sunkist the Perfect Dog, a character in the web series Half-Life VR but the AI is Self-Aware
- Sunkiss (song), a 2025 song by South Korean singer Wendy
- Sun Kiss (song), a 2026 song by South Korean group Tuide
- Sun Kiss 45, a French sailboat
- Sun Kiss 47, a French sailboat
