= Geffen Records =

American record label

- Parent company: Universal Music Group (1996–present); Previously; MCA Inc. (1990–1996)
- Founded: October 1980; 46 years ago
- Founder: David Geffen
- Distributors: Interscope Capitol Labels Group (U.S.); Polydor (UK and France)
- Genre: Various
- Country of origin: United States
- Location: Santa Monica, California, U.S.
- Official website: interscope.com

Geffen Records (formerly The David Geffen Company from 1980 to 1992 and Geffen Records Inc. from 1993 to 2004) is an American record label owned by Interscope Geffen A&M (IGA), a division of the Interscope Capitol Labels Group, which is owned by Universal Music Group. It was founded in 1980 by David Geffen, as a music subsidiary of his then film company Geffen Pictures, with financial and distribution support from Warner Bros. Records.

In 1990, the label was sold to MCA Music Entertainment, which later became Universal Music Group (UMG) through a series of acquisitions by Panasonic and Seagram. Since its merger into the Interscope Geffen A&M group in 1999, Geffen has served as a syndicate label within Interscope Records, expanding its catalog through the absorption of other imprints. It has operated as a key platform for new releases, especially following its 2003 expansion and 2017 relaunch. As of 2024, Geffen is part of Universal Music Group's Interscope Capitol Labels Group.

== History ==
=== Formation (1980–1990) ===
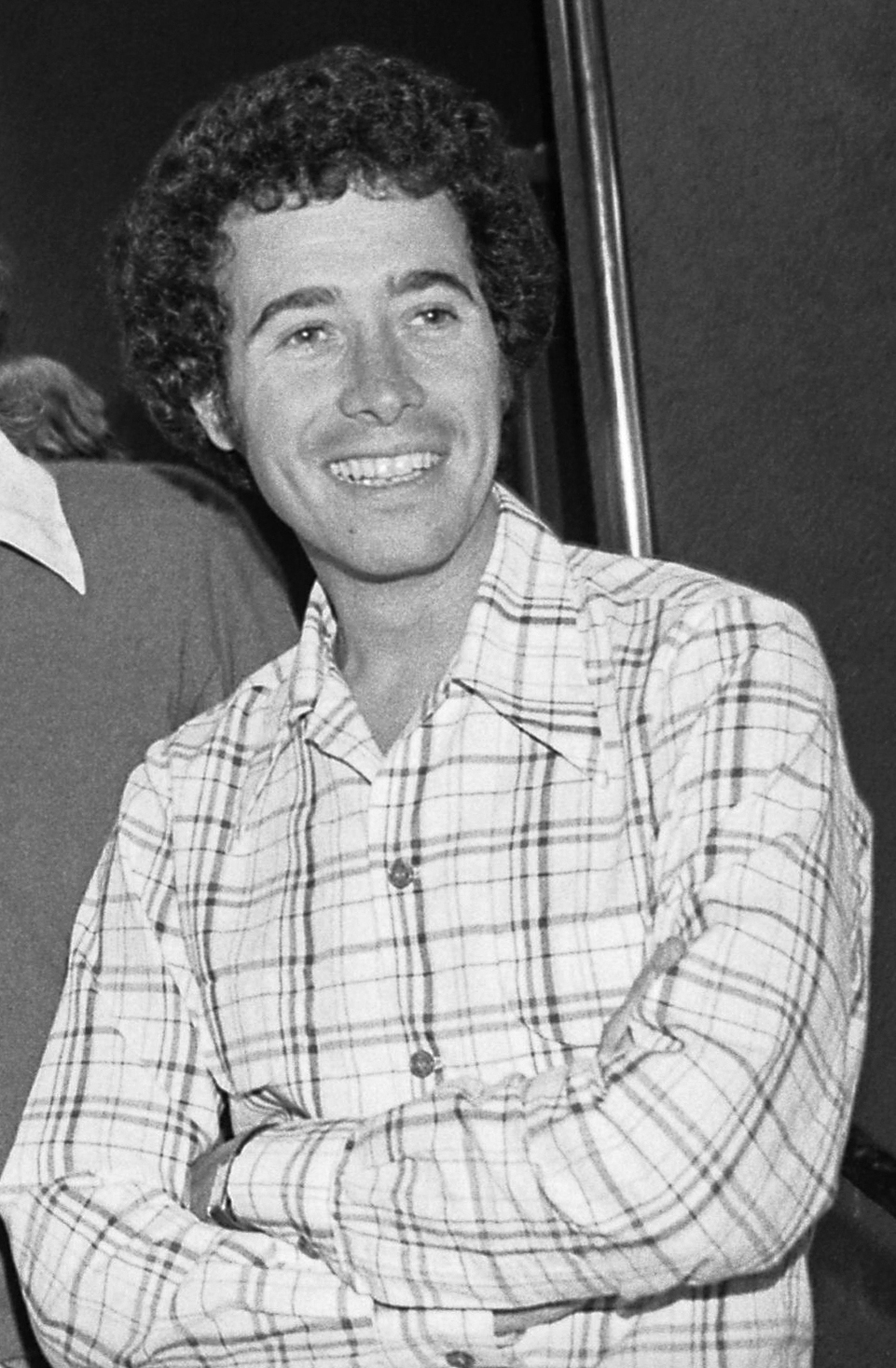
David Geffen (pictured in 1973) founded Geffen Records in 1980.

Geffen Records began operations in 1980. It was created by music industry businessman David Geffen who, in 1971, had co-founded Asylum Records with Elliot Roberts. Geffen stepped down from Asylum in 1975, when he crossed over to film and was named a vice president of Warner Bros. Pictures. He was fired from Warner in c. 1978, but still remained locked in a five-year contract, which prevented him from working elsewhere. When that deal expired, he returned to work in 1980 and struck a deal with Warner Bros. Records (now simply Warner Records, due to the label's disassociation from Warner Bros. Pictures in 2004), to create Geffen Records. Warner Bros. Records provided 100 percent of the funding for the label's start-up and operations, while it distributed its releases in North America, with CBS's Epic Records handling distribution in the rest of the world until 1985 when Warner Music Group (parent company of Warner Records and formerly a division of Time Warner/Warner Bros. Discovery until 2004) took over distribution for the rest of the world. Profits were split 50% each between Geffen Records and its respective distributors. Despite being named for founder and original owner David Geffen, it has been acknowledged that Ed Rosenblatt, who became president of Geffen Records upon its inception in 1980, was the one who led Geffen Records during its heyday in the 1980s and 1990s.

The label released Double Fantasy by John Lennon and Yoko Ono. Two weeks after it entered the charts, Lennon was murdered in New York City. Subsequently, the album went on to sell millions and gave Geffen its first number-one album and single; the rights to the album would later be taken over by EMI, which eventually would be absorbed by Geffen's then-future parent, Universal Music Group in 2012.

As the mid-1980s progressed, Geffen would go on to have extended success with such acts as Asia, Berlin, Enya, Kylie Minogue, Quarterflash, Wang Chung, and Sammy Hagar. The label also signed several established acts such as Elton John, Irene Cara, Cher, Debbie Harry, Don Henley, Joni Mitchell, Neil Young, Peter Gabriel, and Jennifer Holliday. Toward the end of the decade, the company also began making a name for itself as an emerging rock label, thanks to the success of Whitesnake (U.S. and Canada only), The Stone Roses, Guns N' Roses, Tesla, Sonic Youth and the comeback of 1970s-era rockers Aerosmith. This prompted Geffen to create a subsidiary label, DGC Records (formerly the David Geffen Company), in 1990; which focused on more progressive rock and would later embrace the emergence of alternative rock—Nirvana being an example. Geffen also briefly distributed the first incarnation of Def American Recordings (now simply American Recordings) through Warner Music Group from 1988 to 1990.

=== Acquisitions by MCA, Panasonic, and Seagram and departure of David Geffen (1990–1998) ===
After nearly a decade of operating through WMG, its contract with the company ended. Geffen was then sold to MCA Music Entertainment, by then, a label division of the now-defunct MCA Inc. in 1990. At that same time, the label negotiated a contract with BMG Distribution to distribute its releases overseas. The deal earned founder David Geffen an estimated US$800 million in stock and an employment contract that ran until then. Following the sale, Geffen Records operated as one of MCA's leading independently managed labels. A year later, MCA was acquired by Japanese conglomerate Matsushita Electric (now Panasonic), bringing Geffen, Universal Pictures and other sister companies along. The acquisition was completed on New Year's Day 1991 for US$6.6 billion.

Geffen stepped down as head of the label in 1995 to collaborate with former Walt Disney Studios chairman Jeffrey Katzenberg and Amblin Entertainment co-founder Steven Spielberg to form DreamWorks SKG (later DreamWorks Pictures), an ambitious multimedia empire dealing in film, television, books and music. Geffen Records would distribute releases on the newly founded company's DreamWorks Records subsidiary. That spring, Panasonic's ownership percentage of MCA was decreased to 20% when the remaining 80% was sold to Canadian distillery company Seagram in exchange for US$5.7 billion. In January 1996, Geffen funded and distributed a short-lived boutique label, Outpost Recordings, featuring the likes of Whiskeytown, Ry Cooder, Veruca Salt, and Hayden. On December 9, 1996, Geffen's parent company, MCA Inc., was reincorporated as Universal Studios, Inc. Even so, its music division, MCA Music Entertainment Group, was also renamed Universal Music Group. However, under UMG's new ownership, Geffen's fortunes began to dwindle.

=== PolyGram merger and Interscope Geffen A&M (1999–2003) ===
On December 10, 1998, Seagram completed its seven-month $10.6 billion plan to acquire PolyGram. As a result, PolyGram's music division was merged into Universal Music Group. Geffen now became sister labels to A&M Records, Island Records, Mercury Records, Def Jam Recordings and Motown (which had previously been a part of UMG during its preceding MCA days from 1988 to 1993). In the ensuing months, a number of corporate reshufflings occurred, resulting in Geffen and A&M, on New Year's Eve 1998, being merged into Interscope Geffen A&M Records. Interscope Geffen A&M became one of Universal Music Group's four new label factions alongside the Verve Label Group, Universal Motown Republic Group and the Island Def Jam Music Group. However, the IGA merger resulted in Geffen firing 110 of its employees. Unlike A&M, which was closed entirely, Geffen was able to continue existing as a one-off brand under Interscope Records. At the same time, international distribution of Interscope and Geffen releases respectively switched from BMG Distribution and Island Records UK to ex-PolyGram label Polydor Records, which had already been distributing A&M releases overseas (in return for A&M handling Polydor releases in the U.S.); A&M was forced to remain as a one-off active label for Interscope following a lawsuit by its co-founders Jerry Moss and Herb Alpert, which was later settled in 2003.

In October 1999, Jordan Schur (of Flip Records) was declared Geffen's new president; this led to Schur stepping down as the head of Flip, but he still managed to maintain control of the label, while certain acts from Flip's roster, such as Cold and Professional Murder Music, were transferred over to Geffen. Geffen's first release under Schur's leadership was the End of Days soundtrack, released in November 1999. Geffen became a predominantly rock music-based label.

=== MCA, DGC and DreamWorks Records merger (2003) ===
Geffen continued to do steady business—even within 2003, UMG folded MCA Records into Geffen that July. Though Geffen had been substantially a pop-rock label, its absorption of MCA (and its back catalogs) led to a more diverse roster; with former MCA artists such as Mary J. Blige, The Roots, Blink-182, Rise Against, and Common now being transferred to the label. Meanwhile, DreamWorks Records, in October, also folded, with its artists roster, consisting of Nelly Furtado, Lifehouse and Rufus Wainwright, being absorbed by Geffen as well. The absorption occurred following a reorganization at DreamWorks Pictures, which resulted in DreamWorks Animation being divested and DreamWorks Records being acquired by UMG. During this time, the remains of DGC Records were also folded into Geffen, although the label was previously absorbed in 1999 following its merger with Interscope. Retained artists, Beck and Sonic Youth, were later redirected to record for Geffen afterwards; DGC was later reactivated in 2007, later operating under Interscope rather than Geffen.

With the mergers of MCA, DGC and DreamWorks into Geffen, more than 103 employees were laid off.

=== Continued success (2003–2009) ===
As the mid-2000s progressed, Geffen's absorption of the MCA, DGC and DreamWorks labels, along with the signage of new acts such as Ashlee Simpson, Angels & Airwaves and Snoop Dogg, had boosted the company to the extent that it began gaining equal footing with the main Interscope label, leading some industry insiders to speculate that it could revert to operating as an independently managed imprint at UMG again. In 2006, musician Ron Fair was named the chairman of Geffen. That same year, after disputes with Interscope co-founder Jimmy Iovine (at the time, the chairman and CEO of Interscope Geffen A&M, parent unit of Geffen), former labelmates 50 Cent and Dr. Dre, rapper The Game was dismissed from G-Unit Records and Interscope division imprint Aftermath Entertainment (the respective labels of the aforementioned latter two), but was later transferred to Geffen to avoid contractual obligations with G-Unit. His sophomore studio album (also his first under the label), Doctor's Advocate, debuted at number one on the U.S. Billboard 200 upon release on November 14, 2006.

Geffen's urban division gained even more notoriety with the IGA resigning of Keyshia Cole through the imprint, following DGC's relaunch and A&M's revitalization as A&M Octone Records in 2007; Cole was previously signed to sister label A&M early in her career from 2004 to that point. Her sophomore album, Just like You, received critical praise and debuted at number two on the Billboard 200. However, at the end of 2007, Geffen was subsided further into Interscope. The restructuring resulted in Geffen laying off sixty employees.

In 2009, it was announced that Geffen Records had signed an agreement with the Holy See to produce an album of Marian songs and prayers from Pope Benedict XVI.

=== Relaunches (2011–2017) ===
Interscope Geffen A&M chairman and CEO Jimmy Iovine relaunched Geffen in 2011, moving its headquarters from Santa Monica to New York City. Former manager of Kanye West, Gee Roberson, was appointed chairman. However, in late 2013, the label went idle with a majority of Geffen's artists now recording under Interscope.

On May 28, 2014, Iovine departed from Interscope Geffen A&M as its chairman and CEO and hired Fueled by Ramen co-founder John Janick as his replacement.

In March 2017, Neil Jacobson was appointed president of Geffen Records to oversee the second relaunch of the label via new signings as well as reinvigoration of the label's legendary catalog.

=== Neil Jacobson's departure and 2020s success (2019–present) ===
In 2018, Interscope musician DJ Snake was drafted to Geffen to release his second studio album, Carte Blanche, which commenced on July 26, 2019. Its single, "Taki Taki", went on to accumulate four million equivalent units in the United States and peak at number one on Billboard's Hot Latin Songs chart.

In December 2019, Neil Jacobson vacated his position as the president of Geffen, leaving to start his own company, Crescent Drive Productions. The following month to a new year, in mid-January 2020, Lee L'Heureux was appointed the general manager of Geffen. The label then started to see more success from artists Rod Wave, Lil Durk, Yungblud and Hotboii (the former two were signed to Geffen through Todd Moscowitz's Alamo Records).

In a staff exchange that July, longtime Interscope executive Nicole Bilzerian was drafted to Geffen to become its executive vice president.

Olivia Rodrigo joined Geffen in the fall of 2020. Her single, "Drivers License", made the number one position on the Billboard Hot 100 in early 2021. That May, she released her debut album, Sour. It accumulated 295,000 album-equivalent units in its first week. Its five-week reign at number one on the Billboard 200 became the longest by a female recording artist that year. Sour also made Rodrigo the first Geffen recording artist and first female artist overall to have a number one album under the label in nearly 13 years since Mary J. Blige's Growing Pains (2007).

Rodrigo followed up Sour in 2023 with Guts. Released in September, it once again debuted at number one on the Billboard 200, and sold 302,000 album-equivalent units in its first week. Also, in 2023, Interscope artist Kali Uchis was drafted to Geffen before releasing her sophomore album, Red Moon in Venus, earlier that March. The album peaked at number four on the Billboard 200, another top five charting success for the label that year.

In 2021, HYBE, then known as Big Hit, announced a partnership between it and Universal Music's Geffen Records to collaborate on various music and technology-related ventures, including music production, global distribution, and marketing for HYBE artists among other things. Among those included a joint venture between it and Geffen Records that debuted a global group that would later be known as Katseye, which formed through the talent competition show Dream Academy in 2023 and debuted in June 2024 through what is now Hybe UMG.

A corporate restructuring of Universal Music in 2024 placed Geffen into the Interscope Capitol Labels Group.

In July 2024, longtime former Geffen Records president Ed Rosenblatt, who served as president of Geffen Records from its inception in 1980 through its glory years of Guns N' Roses, Nirvana, Don Henley and countless others, died.

== Labels ==
- Hybe (For North American releases)
  - ABD
  - ADOR
  - Big Hit Music (distribution for BTS’ releases only)
  - Belift Lab
  - Hybe × Geffen (Hybe UMG) (a joint venture between Hybe, Universal Music Group and Geffen Records)
  - KOZ Entertainment
  - Pledis Entertainment
  - Source Music
  - YX Labels
- Cinematic Music Group
- Downtown Records
- Rebel Music
- Simple Stupid Records
- GoodTalk

== Artists ==
=== Current artists ===
- 4TUNAT (FlyTown/Geffen)
- Abby Jasmine (Cinematic Music Group/Geffen Records; distribution formerly licensed to Foundation Media)
- Ado (Virgin Records/Geffen)
- Alesso (10:22PM/Geffen)
- Ann Marie
- BoyNextDoor (Hybe – KOZ/Geffen; distribution in the US)
- Braden Bales
- BTS (Hybe – Big Hit/Geffen; distribution in the US)
- Byron Messia
- Camila Cabello (Geffen/Interscope)
- Celeste
- Cian Ducrot
- ColintheKidd (Droolpz Records)
- Dave (Neighbourhood/Geffen)
- Dexter Tortoriello (Downtown Records/Geffen)
- Enhypen (Hybe – Belift Lab/Geffen; distribution in the US)
- Guns N' Roses
- Hard Life
- Highway (Victor Victor Worldwide/Geffen)
- Holly Humberstone
- Hotboii (Rebel Music/Geffen)
- Illit (Hybe – Belift Lab/Geffen; distribution in the US)
- Inhaler
- J-Hope (Hybe – Big Hit/Geffen; distribution in the US)
- Jimin (Hybe – Big Hit/Geffen; distribution in the US)
- Jungkook (Hybe – Big Hit/Geffen; distribution in the US)
- Kali Uchis (EMI/Geffen; Previously with Interscope)
- Katseye (Hybe – Hybe × Geffen (Hybe UMG/Geffen))
- Le Sserafim (Hybe – Source Music/Geffen; distribution in the US)
- Kenneth Cash (Cinematic Music Group/Geffen)
- Kidd G (Big Machine - Valory Music Co./Geffen)
- Lawsy (Listen to the Kids/Geffen)
- Lil Heat (Cinematic Music Group/Geffen; distribution licensed to Ingrooves and previously with Foundation Media)
- Lola Kirke (Downtown Records/Geffen)
- Lucy Dacus
- Lul Bob (Good Money Global/Cinematic Music Group/Geffen; distribution licensed to Ingrooves and previously with Foundation Media)
- That Mexican OT
- Michael Kiwanuka
- midwxst (Simple Stupid/Geffen)
- NewJeans (Hybe – ADOR/Geffen; distribution in the US)
- Nirvana (from DGC Records) (Reissues)
- Jace! (Simple Stupid/Geffen; distribution licensed to Ingrooves and previously with Foundation Media)
- Ola Runt (Front Street/Cinematic Music Group/Geffen; distribution formerly licensed to Ingrooves and previously with Foundation Media)
- Olivia Rodrigo
- Prentiss (Cinematic Music Group/Geffen)
- RM (Hybe – Big Hit/Geffen; distribution in the US)
- Rob49 (Rebel Music/Geffen; distribution licensed to Ingrooves and previously with Foundation Media)
- Saint Satine (Hybe – Hybe × Geffen (Hybe UMG/Geffen))
- Seventeen (Hybe – Pledis/Geffen; distribution in the US)
- Screwly G (Grade A/Geffen)
- Skaiwater (Cinematic Music Group/Geffen)
- Skilla Baby
- Smokingskul (Simple Stupid/Geffen)
- SpotemGottem (Rebel Music/Geffen)
- Suga (Hybe – Big Hit/Geffen; distribution in the US)
- Tay Money
- Thug Drama (BTM Music Group Inc.)
- Tokyo's Revenge (Blac Noize!/Cypress Park Music/Geffen/Interscope; distribution licensed to Foundation Media)
- TWS (Hybe – Pledis/Geffen; distribution in the US)
- Tuide (Hybe – ABD/Geffen; distribution in the US)
- V (Hybe – Big Hit/Geffen; distribution in the US)
- Yeat (Field Trip/Lyfestyle Corporation/Geffen)
- Yhapojj (Simple Stupid/Geffen)
- Zack Bia (Field Trip/Geffen)

=== Former artists ===
- A Drop in the Gray
- Aerosmith (from Columbia Records)
- Aimee Mann
- Alex Salibian
- AlunaGeorge
- Angels & Airwaves
- Ashlee Simpson
- Asia
- Avant (from Magic Johnson Music/MCA Records)
- Avicii
- Berlin
- Bipolar Sunshine
- Big Time Rush (Downtown Records/Geffen)
- Black Lab
- Blaque
- Blink-182 (from MCA Records)
- Box Car Racer
- Bobby Brown
- Cher
- Common (GOOD/Geffen, from MCA Records)
- Counting Crows
- Cowboy Junkies
- Dazz Band
- Depswa
- DJ Snake
- Don Henley
- Donna Summer
- Eagles
- Elton John
- Emile Haynie
- Enya
- Eve (from Ruff Ryders/Interscope)
- Field Mob (Disturbing tha Peace/Geffen, from MCA Records)
- Finch (from Drive-Thru Records)
- fromis_9 (Hybe – Pledis/Geffen; distribution in the US)
- The Game (from Aftermath/G-Unit/Interscope)
- Garbage (from Almo Sounds)
- Girlicious
- Greyson Chance (eleveneleven/Maverick/Geffen)
- Gryffin
- GZA
- Huddy
- Irene Cara
- Jacob Collier
- Jeff Bhasker
- Jennifer Holliday
- J.I the Prince of N.Y (G*STARR/Interscope/Geffen)
- John Kilzer
- John Lennon
- John Waite
- Ken Laszlo
- Keyshia Cole (from Imani Entertainment/A&M)
- Klepto (from Larceny Entertainment)
- Kylie Minogue
- Lifehouse
- The Like
- Lil Durk (from Alamo/OTF/Interscope)
- Lil Jon
- Madness
- Marshmello
- Martin Terefe
- Mary J. Blige (from MCA Records)
- Mura Masa
- Mr. C
- Mr. Vegas
- Nelly Furtado (from DreamWorks Records)
- Neon Trees (Thrill Forever Records/Downtown Records/Geffen)
- New Found Glory
- Orianthi
- Peter Gabriel (US/Canada)
- The Plimsouls
- Puddle of Mudd
- Quarterflash
- Rise Against
- Rod Wave (from Alamo; distribution licensed to Foundation Media and previously with EMPIRE)
- The Roots (from DGC Records, later switched to MCA Records, then back to Geffen)
- Sauce Money (Roc-A-Fella/Geffen, later switched to MCA Records)
- Shaggy (from MCA Records)
- Smokepurpp (from Alamo/Interscope)
- Snoop Dogg (Doggy Style/Star Trak/Geffen, from MCA Records)
- Solange (Music World/Geffen)
- Sonic Youth
- The Starting Line (from Drive-Thru Records)
- Tesla
- Tei Shi (Downtown Records/Geffen)
- Thug Drama (BTM Music Group Inc.)
- Tommy Keene
- Torexeon
- TRUSTCompany
- Wang Chung
- Weezer
- XTC (US)
- Yoko Ono
- Yungblud (Locomotion/Geffen, later switched to Capitol Records)

== See also ==
- Geffen Records discography
- John Kalodner
- List of record labels
