= Sun Kiss (song) =

Single by Tuide

from the EP Tune & Play
- Language: English; Korean
- Released: August 24, 2026.
- Length: 3:01
- Label: ABD
- Composers: GroovyRoom; Boycold; Kwaca; Maya Rose; John Emil; Tomo Tc
- Lyricists: Shim Eun-ji; Zin Choi; J14 (Full8loom); Maya Rose; John Emil

Music video
- "Sun Kiss" on YouTube

"Sun Kiss" is a song recorded by South Korean girl group Tuide for their debut extended play (EP) Tune & Play. It was released as the lead single by ABD on August 24, 2026.

== Background ==
Hybe teased a new label dedicated to girl groups titled ABD on May 8, 2026, overseen by music producer Han Sung-soo. On July 20, 2026, ABD officially announced TUIDE, unveiling the group's name and official logo. On August 3, 2026, ABD announced that the group would release their debut extended play, Tune & Play on August 24. On August 5, 2026, the group revealed "Sun Kiss" as the lead single. On August 20 and 22, the group released the teasers for the music video for the music video.

== Music video ==
The music video was filmed in Iceland. Member Saki explained that the group wanted the video's setting to complement the song's bright and carefree atmosphere, with scenes of the members dancing and spending time outdoors.

== Composition and lyrics ==
"Sun Kiss" incorporates a sample of Soviente's "Copacabana (Escape from Rio)" and features a youthful, laid-back sound with summery musical elements. The song is about trusting your own instincts and staying with the feeling of the moment. Member Elena highlighted the song's repetitive hook, describing it as one of its strongest features. Member Jia said the song showcases the group's musical identity and the individual appeal of its seven members. She described it as capturing the positive energy of dancing in the sunlight. Member Yi Hani explained the song centers on trusting one's own voice and being confident.

== Promotion ==
Tuide performed "Sun Kiss" for the first time on Mnet's M Countdown on August 27. The group continued promotions with performances on KBS's Music Bank on August 28 and SBS's Inkigayo on August 31.

== Charts ==
=== Weekly charts ===
Weekly chart performance for "Sun Kiss"
Chart (2026)	Peak position
South Korea (Circle)	54

=== Monthly charts ===
Monthly chart performance for "Sun Kiss"
Chart (2026)	Peak position
South Korea (Circle)	60

== Release history ==
Release history for "Sun Kiss"
Region	Date	Format	Label
Various	August 24, 2026	Digital download; streaming	ABD
