= Tune & Play =

- Digital cover

EP by Tuide
- Released: August 24, 2026
- Recorded: 2026
- Length: 12:42
- Language: Korean
- Label: ABD

Singles from Tune & Play
- 1. "Sun Kiss" Released: August 24, 2026

Professional ratings
Review scores
Source	Rating
IZM	2.5/5 stars

Tune & Play is the debut extended play (EP) by South Korean girl group Tuide. It was released by ABD on August 24, 2026, and contains five tracks, including the lead single "Sun Kiss".

== Background and release ==
On July 20, 2026, ABD officially announced TUIDE, unveiling the group's name and official logo. On August 3, 2026, ABD announced that the group would release their debut extended play, Tune & Play on August 24. On August 5, 2026, The group revealed "Sun Kiss" as the lead single.

== Promotion ==
At the beginning of August 2026, the group released a performance of their pre-debut song "Grls" on August 7 and hosted their pre-debut teaser shows in Seoul named "Tuide Exclusive Preview (Playground)", where they performed the songs that were included on their debut EP Tune & Play, and announced its lead single "Sun Kiss".

== Composition ==
"ABD" is a 90s R&B and soul with lo-fi elements. The lyrics reflect the label's philosophy of envisioning "D" instead of "C" after "A" and "B". "Sun Kiss" is a soultronic and afro house genre track that capturing the moment of trusting and expressing one's own unique voice and sensibilities. "Echo" is a deep house and uptempo classic house genres capturing the experience of falling for someone. "Flip-Flop Girl" is a gangsta funk sound about a girl who drifts leisurely, guided by her own intuition. "Grls" is a UK garage song embracing a unique "bestie-tude", rather than being confined by the gaze of others.

== Track listing ==
Track listing for Tune & Play
No.	Title	Lyrics	Music	Length
1.	"ABD"	Shim Eun-ji; Zin Choi; J14 (Full8loom); Maya Rose; John Emil	GroovyRoom; Boycold; Kwaca; Maya Rose; John Emil; Tomo Tc	1:59
2.	"Sun Kiss"	GroovyRoom; Daehee; Kwaca; Destiny Rogers; Jonathan Yip; Maya Rose; Kelly Valentina Porter; Robbie Gardunio; Anna Maria Rocchi; Davide Marani	GroovyRoom; Daehee; Kwaca; Destiny Rogers; Jonathan Yip; Maya Rose; Kelly Valentina Porter; Robbie Gardunio; Anna Maria Rocchi; Davide Marani	3:01
3.	"Echo"	Zin Choi; Lee Seu-ran; Kwaca; Evan; Kang Se-bi (153/Joombas); Bay; Tara Nabavi; Wiljam; John Emil	GroovyRoom; Kwaca; Tara Nabavi; Wiljam; John Emil; James Harris III; Terry Lewis; Wayne K. Garfield; Mauro Malavasi; Davide Romani; Janet Jackson; Tomo Tc	2:20
4.	"Flip-Flop Girl"	Since; Ben Bliss; Olga Sundin; Adam Benyahia	GroovyRoom; Boycold; Kwaca; Olga Sundin; Adam Benyahia; Tomo Tc	2:33
5.	"Grls"	Soovi; Dalchong (Cheeze); Maya Rose; John Emil	GroovyRoom; Kwaca; Maya Rose; John Emil; Tomo Tc	2:49
Total length:				12:42

Notes

"Echo" samples "All For You" by Janet Jackson.

== Charts ==
=== Weekly charts ===
Weekly chart performance for Tune & Play
Chart (2026)	Peak position
Greek Albums (IFPI)	95
South Korean Albums (Circle)	5

=== Monthly charts ===
Monthly chart performance for Tune & Play
Chart (2026)	Peak position
South Korean Albums (Circle)	14

== Release history ==
Release history for Tune & Play
Region	Date	Format	Label
South Korea	August 24, 2026	CD	ABD
Various	August 24, 2026	Digital download; streaming	ABD
