= Lawsy =

American singer and rapper

- Also known as: lawsymf
- Born: Lawson James Mayo; September 21, 2007 (age 19); Raleigh, North Carolina, U.S
- Genres: Hip hop; R&B; Alternative
- Occupations: Singer; songwriter; rapper
- Instrument: Vocals
- Years active: 2020–present
- Labels: Geffen; Listen to the Kids

Lawson James Mayo (born September 21, 2007), known professionally as Lawsy, is an American singer and rapper. He is known for his single "Hotel" which received traction on social media platforms, including TikTok.

== Early life ==
Mayo was born on September 21, 2007, in Raleigh, North Carolina. He stated how his life in North Carolina wasn't filled with much to do, and rather it was very boring. In an interview with Lyrical Lemonade, Mayo stated how he began making music at the age of eight.

== Musical style ==
Using classic R&B as a major influence, he is creating the “Sexxnb” genre, which juxtaposes passion and romance with themes of heartbreak and pain.

== Discography ==
=== Albums ===
Title	Album details
Sexxnb, Vol 1	Released: November 18, 2022; Label: Geffen Records, Listen to the Kids; Format: Digital download, streaming
Lawsy Pick Up	Released: July 18, 2023; Label: Geffen Records, Listen to the Kids; Format: Digital download, streaming
