= Espace 1300 =

French sailboat class

Development
- Designer: Philippe Briand
- Location: France
- Year: 1981
- Builder: Jeanneau
- Role: Cruiser
- Name: Espace 1300

Boat
- Displacement: 26,460 lb (12,002 kg)
- Draft: 8.79 ft (2.68 m) with centerboard down

Hull
- Type: monohull
- Construction: fiberglass
- LOA: 44.29 ft (13.50 m)
- LWL: 37.24 ft (11.35 m)
- Beam: 14.44 ft (4.40 m)
- Engine: Perkins Engines 82 hp (61 kW) diesel engine

Hull appendages
- Keel: stub keel and centerboard
- Ballast: 10,141 lb (4,600 kg)
- Rudder: spade-type rudder

Rig
- Rig type: Bermuda rig
- I foretriangle height: 52.48 ft (16.00 m)
- J foretriangle base: 17.20 ft (5.24 m)
- P mainsail luff: 47.60 ft (14.51 m)
- E mainsail foot: 14.89 ft (4.54 m)

Sails
- Sailplan: masthead sloop
- Mainsail area: 354.38 sq ft (32.923 m^{2})
- Jib/genoa area: 451.33 sq ft (41.930 m^{2})
- Total sail area: 805.71 sq ft (74.853 m^{2})

The Espace 1300 (English: Space) is a French sailboat that was designed by Philippe Briand as a cruiser and first built in 1981. The boat is part of the Espace series of cruising sailboats and its designation indicates its approximate length overall in centimeters.

The boat's hull design was reused for the 1983 Sun Kiss 45.

== Production ==
The design was built by Jeanneau in France starting in 1981, but it is now out of production.

== Design ==
The Espace 1300 is a recreational keelboat, built predominantly of fiberglass, with wood trim and a masthead sloop rig. The hull has a raked stem, a reverse transom, an internally mounted spade-type rudder controlled by a two wheels, one on the cockpit and one in the wheelhouse, It has a stub keel and retractable centerboard, or optional fixed fin keel. It displaces 26,460 lb (12,002 kg) and carries 10,141 lb (4,600 kg) of ballast.

The keel-equipped version of the boat has a draft of 6.89 ft (2.10 m), while the centerboard-equipped version has a draft of 8.79 ft (2.68 m) with the centerboard extended and 5.02 ft (1.53 m) with it retracted, allowing operation in shallow water.

The boat is fitted with a British Perkins Engines diesel engine of 82 hp (61 kW). The fuel tank holds 105 U.S. gallons (400 L; 87 imp gal) and the fresh water tank has a capacity of 209 U.S. gallons (790 L; 174 imp gal).

The design has sleeping accommodation for seven people, with a double berth and a single berth in the forward cabin and two aft cabins, each with a double berth. The main salon has a U-shaped settee around a dinette table on the port side. The galley is located on the starboard side amidships. The galley is U-shaped and is equipped with a two-burner stove and a double sink. The navigation station is located in the raised wheelhouse, on the port side. There are two heads, one just forward of the forward cabin in the bow and one on the starboard side below the wheelhouse.

The design has a hull speed of 8.18 kn (15.15 km/h).

== See also ==
- List of sailing boat types
