= A Drop in the Gray =

American alternative musical group

Background information
- Origin: Los Angeles, California, United States
- Genres: New wave, post-punk, pop rock
- Past members: Danny Phillips; Colin Campbell; Marti Frederiksen; Richard Bell; Hans Christian; Eric Carter; Jamie Sheriff; Harry Rushakoff

A Drop in the Gray are an alternative musical group formed in 1983, and a pioneer of the Los Angeles 1980s post punk music scene. They produced one critically acclaimed album, and several lesser recordings before disbanding in 1986. Founding members Danny Phillips and Colin Campbell are apparently actively writing and recording again with a view to releasing new material as well as a planned re-mastering and re-release of their debut album.

== History ==
A Drop in the Gray began forming in 1982, led by Danny Phillips a native of San Francisco who relocated to Los Angeles. Upon arriving in LA Phillips met Scottish guitarist Colin Campbell. The two began collaborating on mainly Phillips compositions and crafted what would become a lush rich melancholic sound rounded out with harder melodic guitars. Later that year, bassist Hans Christian, a keyboardist, and drummer Marti Frederiksen joined Phillips and Campbell, and by 1983, the band was established.

The group signed with Geffen Records shortly before making their debut performance at The Rodeo in San Diego on July 31, 1984. A few months later, on October 27, 1984, they opened for The Fixx at a concert at the amphitheater at UCSD. Their performance was compared to The Fixx and was described as "tight and polished". A heavy touring schedule saw the band enhance its reputation as a solid live act. In 1984 A Drop in the Gray recorded their first album, Certain Sculptures, for Geffen Records. The album was well received and found the band an audience not only in the US but also Europe.

In 1985 drummer Marti Frederiksen left the band to be replaced by Harry Rushakoff, who later joined Concrete Blonde.

Following internal re-shuffling and management issues Geffen Records dropped the group in 1986. The band continued to write and perform for a year but ultimately disbanded.

Danny Phillips went on to form the band Chaintown. Later he would also record as a solo artist. There is talk of Phillips and Campbell recording again as A Drop in the Gray.

Colin Campbell relocated to London and went on to form Oceans Apart with Norwegian keyboardist Dag Veidal and singer Astrid Graasvoll. The band signed to Polygram records and charted in the Scandinavian album charts. He later worked with Roy Orbison and is involved with film & TV soundtrack recording.

Marti Frederiksen became a successful songwriter and producer with several projects, most notably his long time involvement with Aerosmith.

Hans Christian moved on to work with John Waite and Sparks. He moved to the San Francisco Bay Area in 1989 and started his own recording company, working with notable chant artists Krishna Das, Jai Uttal and many others. His own band RASA (1999–2007) was signed to Hearts Of Space Records/Vally Entertainment and New Earth Records. He is now based in Sturgeon Bay, WI and operates as a producer out of STUDIO 330.

Discography

A Drop in the Gray released one album and some singles.

- Certain Sculptures (LP) on Geffen Records - 1984
- All the Same B/W Fall and Cry (12 inch promo single) on Geffen Records (LP) - 1984
- Heartache Feeds Heartache (7 inch promo single) on Geffen Records (LP) - 1985
