= Han Sung-soo =

South Korean musician (born 1971)

- 한성수
- Born: 1971 (age 54–55)
- Education: Chung-Ang University
- Occupations: Master Professional; Music executive
- Title: Founder of Pledis Entertainment; Master Professional at Pledis Entertainment; insider director

Han Sung-soo (Korean: 한성수; born 1971) is a South Korean music executive. He is the founder of Pledis Entertainment, a record label known for developing artists including After School, NU'EST, Seventeen and TWS. Before entering the music industry, Han studied Korean dance at Chung-Ang University and performed with the National Dance Company of Korea. He later worked at SM Entertainment as a manager for BoA.

Han founded Pledis in 2007 and served as its chief executive and principal executive producer. Following the acquisition of a controlling interest in Pledis by Big Hit Entertainment later known as HYBE in 2020, he continued to oversee the label's creative production under the title Master Professional. He received the Best Producer award at the Melon Music Awards in 2023 and at Golden Disc Awards in 2025.

== Early life and dance career ==
During middle and high school, Han became interested in traditional Korean music and Korean culture through his mother's encouragement. After learning Korean dance, he enrolled in the Department of Dance at Chung-Ang University, where he majored in Korean dance.

After graduating, Han joined the National Dance Company of Korea as a dancer and spent much of his twenties performing overseas. He later concluded that dance was not his vocation and developed an interest in working in popular music. At the age of 30, he left his dance career to enter the entertainment industry.

== Career ==
=== Early career at SM Entertainment ===
Han later said that he began to feel that dance was not his calling and became interested in popular entertainment as the music industry expanded following H.O.T.'s debut. At the age of 30, he applied for management positions at several entertainment companies, including Daesung Planning now known as DSP Media and SM Entertainment, but initially received no response. After visiting SM's offices more than 30 times over two months, Han eventually made contact with the company's founder, Lee Soo-man, and expressed his desire to learn the entertainment business. He was then hired as a manager.

Han said his first assignment at SM Entertainment was standing nearby during a Fly to the Sky music video shoot and filming with a 6 mm camera for monitoring purposes. After several months of junior work, he was assigned as BoA's manager.

Han managed BoA from her trainee period and including during the expansion of her career into Japan. The position gave him experience in artist management and direct exposure to the Japanese music industry. Han later said that SM's strategy of viewing Asia as a broader market, rather than focusing exclusively on South Korea, influenced his own approach to artist development and international promotion.

=== CJ Music and S-Blush ===
After leaving SM Entertainment, Han participated in the development of S-Blush, a Korean-American girl group created as an overseas focused project by CJ Music. The group's original lineup included Son Dam-bi and Kahi, who trained in South Korea and the United States. Its single, "It's My Life", reached number two on the US Billboard Hot Dance Club Play chart in 2007. Han later described the project as formative experience in producing artists for overseas markets.

=== 2007: Founding of Pledis Entertainment ===
In 2007, Han founded Pledis Entertainment, with Son and Kahi as its initial trainees. The company initially operated without a dedicated office and maintained only a practice room. Han said that he prioritized investment in training because he intended to establish a long-term artist-development system rather than focus solely on producing an individual singer.

==== Early artists ====
Son Dam-bi debuted as Pledis's first recording artist in 2007. Han subsequently developed the girl group After School, which debuted in January 2009 under the leadership of Kahi.

After School's subunit Orange Caramel debuted in 2010 with a contrasting musical and visual identity characterized by unconventional concepts and choreography.

Han later oversaw the production of NU'EST, Pledis's first boy group, which debuted in March 2012. He emphasized storytelling choreography and sought to give the group a distinct identity that could appeal to international audiences.

In May 2012, Pledis and Fantagio launched the girl group Hello Venus as a joint project managed through Tricell Media. Two of the group's original members, Yoo Ara and Yoonjo, had previously trained under Pledis as prospective After School members.

==== Seventeen and later productions ====
Han developed Seventeen and served as the group's executive producer, overseeing its creative direction. Kim Yeon-soo, who joined Pledis Entertainment in 2012, was also involved in bringing the group to debut and later led its expansion into the Japanese market.

The members underwent a multiyear training process as Pledis worked to identify their individual strengths and establish the group's identity. He said that Pledis's role was to identify each trainee's individual strengths and work with the members to refine the group's identity and creative direction.

He described his role as helping the members express their own ideas and strengths rather than imposing a separate identity on them. Seventeen's involvement in songwriting, choreography and other aspects of production subsequently became a central feature of the group's public identity.

Under Han's leadership, Pledis launched the ten-member girl group Pristin in March 2017 with the extended play Hi! Pristin. The group disbanded in May 2019, two years after its debut.

From the group's debut in 2018 until April 2020, Han served as the general producer of the project girl group Iz*One. He oversaw the production of its first three Korean releases, Color*Iz, Heart*Iz and Bloom*Iz.

Han later led the production of Sparkling Blue, the debut extended play by Pledis's boy group TWS, which was released in January 2024. TWS was the company's first new boy group since Seventeen's debut nine years earlier.

=== Hybe ===
Before Pledis Entertainment's acquisition, Han and Sony subsidiary Solasia Entertainment each held 50 percent of the company. In May 2020, Big Hit Entertainment, later renamed Hybe Corporation, acquired a controlling interest in Pledis. Following the acquisition, Hybe held 85 percent of the company, while Han retained 10 percent and Sony Music Solutions retained 5 percent.

Han stepped down as Pledis's representative director in March 2022 but remained an inside director, shareholder and the principal executive responsible for its creative production. He subsequently used the professional title “Master Professional”.

During the first half of 2024, Hybe purchased a further 1,204 Pledis shares, equivalent to a 5 percent interest, for approximately ₩20.8 billion under a shareholder put-option agreement. The transaction increased Hybe's ownership from 85 to 90 percent. Hybe did not disclose the seller, although financial reporting identified Han as the likely seller because the interest covered by his put-option arrangement decreased from 10 to 5 percent.

==== ABD ====
In May 2026, Hybe launched ABD, a new label specializing in girl groups. Pledis Entertainment owns 85 percent of the company, while Han owns the remaining 15 percent. His minority interest is governed by a shareholder agreement under which the Hybe group granted a put option over the entire 15 percent stake and holds a conditional call option to acquire it. The agreement also includes rights concerning first refusal and joint or compelled sales, and restricts Han from transferring the shares for a specified period. Noh Ji-won, formerly head of artist planning at Pledis, was appointed CEO of ABD. In July, ABD introduced its inaugural seven-member girl group, TUIDE, with Han serving as executive producer of its inaugural group, overseeing its music, concepts and performances.

== Production style ==
Han's background in Korean dance influenced his emphasis on choreography, performance and stage presentation. His early productions were noted for giving each act a distinct identity, including After School's performance oriented concepts, Orange Caramel's cute synchronized choreography, and NU'EST's storytelling-based choreography.

In his work with Seventeen, Han emphasized frequent communication with the members so that their strengths, intended messages and creative goals were reflected in the group's albums and performances. He linked this approach to Seventeen's self-production, noting that the members had expressed their experiences and emotions through their music and performances since their debut.

== Selected artist management and production work ==
Artist	Role	Involvement	Ref.
BoA	Manager	Worked as her manager at SM Entertainment during the early years of her career, including her expansion into the Japanese music market	
Son Dam-bi	Executive producer	Oversaw album production	
After School	Executive producer	Oversaw album production	
Orange Caramel	Executive producer	Oversaw album production	
NU'EST	Executive producer	Oversaw album production	
Han Dong-geun	Executive producer	Oversaw album production	
Seventeen	Executive producer	Oversaw album production	
Pristin	Executive producer	Oversaw album production	
fromis 9	Executive producer	Oversaw album production	
TWS	Executive producer	Oversaw album production	
Iz*One	Executive producer	Oversaw the group's planning, member training and production of its first three Korean albums from 2018 until April 2020	
TUIDE	Executive producer	Oversees the group's overall production	

== Criticism ==
=== IZ*ONE copyright registrations ===
In May 2020, Han was criticized after it was reported from Dispatch that songwriting credits for eight songs by Iz*One had been registered under the pseudonym “SO JAY”, which belonged to his wife. Dispatch noted that she had previously worked as a visual director and was not publicly known to have a background in music production or songwriting. Pledis Entertainment stated that Han had personally participated in the songs but had chosen to register the credits under his wife's name.

Han acknowledged that receiving royalties under his wife's name had been inappropriate and apologized, stating that he had wanted recognition and compensation for his participation in the music. The registrations drew further criticism because he had separately been compensated for serving as Iz*One's executive producer.

In June 2020, Pledis announced that Han had relinquished his rights to all eight songs and would return the royalties received under his wife's name to the original songwriters. At the time of the announcement, SO JAY had already been removed from the credits of seven songs, and Pledis stated that the remaining registration would also be withdrawn.

== Awards and recognition ==
Awards and honours received by Han
Year	Award or ceremony	Category or honour	Ref.
2023	Melon Music Awards	Best Producer	
2024	Korea Content Awards	Prime Minister's Commendation, Contribution to Overseas Expansion	
2025	Golden Disc Awards	Producer Award	

=== Listicles ===
Year	Publisher	List	Ref.
2024	Billboard	International Power Players	
2024	Billboard	Indie Power Players	
2025	Billboard	Indie Power Players	
2026	Billboard	Indie Power Players	
