= Sun Kiss 47 =

Sailboat class

Development
- Designer: Philippe Briand
- Location: France
- Year: 1982
- No. built: 315
- Builder: Jeanneau
- Role: Cruiser
- Name: Sun Kiss 47

Boat
- Displacement: 25,353 lb (11,500 kg)
- Draft: 8.83 ft (2.69 m)

Hull
- Type: monohull
- Construction: fiberglass
- LOA: 47.42 ft (14.45 m)
- LWL: 37.25 ft (11.35 m)
- Beam: 14.40 ft (4.39 m)
- Engine: Perkins Engines or Yanmar Yanmar 2GM20 55 hp (41 kW) diesel engine

Hull appendages
- Keel: fin keel
- Ballast: 10,150 lb (4,604 kg)
- Rudder: spade-type rudder

Rig
- Rig type: Bermuda rig
- I foretriangle height: 53.48 ft (16.30 m)
- J foretriangle base: 17.23 ft (5.25 m)
- P mainsail luff: 47.25 ft (14.40 m)
- E mainsail foot: 14.93 ft (4.55 m)

Sails
- Sailplan: cutter rigged sloop
- Mainsail area: 391 sq ft (36.3 m^{2})
- Jib/genoa area: 431 sq ft (40.0 m^{2})
- Spinnaker area: 1,565 sq ft (145.4 m^{2})
- Other sails: genoa: 700 sq ft (65 m^{2}) storm jib: 94 sq ft (8.7 m^{2})
- Upwind sail area: 1,090 sq ft (101 m^{2})
- Downwind sail area: 1,956 sq ft (181.7 m^{2})

The Sun Kiss 47 is a French sailboat that was designed by Philippe Briand as a cruiser and first built in 1982.

The design is the larger of the two boats that make up the Sun Kiss sailboat range, the other being the Sun Kiss 45. The Sun Kiss 47 is a lengthened version of the Sun Kiss 45.

== Production ==
The design was built by Jeanneau in France, from 1982 until 1989, with 315 boats completed.

== Design ==
The Sun Kiss 47 is a recreational keelboat, built predominantly of fiberglass, with wood trim. It has a cutter rig, with a deck-stepped mast, two sets of unswept spreaders and aluminum spars with stainless steel wire rigging. The hull has a raked stem, a walk-through reverse transom, an internally mounted spade-type rudder controlled by a wheel and a fixed fin keel, shoal draft keel or optional stub keel and retractable centerboard. The fixed keel model displaces 25,353 lb (11,500 kg) and carries 9,039 lb (4,100 kg) of ballast, while the centerboard version displaces 26,455 lb (12,000 kg) and carries 10,141 lb (4,600 kg) of ballast.

The keel-equipped version of the boat has a draft of 8.83 ft (2.69 m), the shoal draft version of the boat has a draft of 6.92 ft (2.11 m), while the centerboard-equipped version has a draft of 8.8 ft (2.7 m) with the centerboard extended and 5.0 ft (1.5 m) with it retracted, allowing operation in shallow water.

The boat is fitted with either a British Perkins Engines or Japanese Yanmar diesel engine of 55 hp (41 kW) for docking and maneuvering. The fuel tank holds 56 U.S. gallons (210 L; 47 imp gal) and the fresh water tank has a capacity of 153 U.S. gallons (580 L; 127 imp gal).

The design has sleeping accommodation for up to eight people, with a double berth in the forward cabin or an option of two bow cabins. There is an L-shaped settee and a straight settee in the main cabin and two aft cabins, both with double berths. The galley is located on the starboard side amidships and is equipped with a two-burner stove, ice box and a double sink. A navigation station is aft of the galley, on the starboard side. There are two heads, one just forward of the bow cabin in the forepeak and one centered aft, along with separate sinks in each aft cabin. Cabin maximum headroom is 77 in (196 cm).

For sailing downwind the design may be equipped with a symmetrical spinnaker of 1,565 sq ft (145.4 m^{2}).

The design has a hull speed of 8.18 kn (15.15 km/h).

== See also ==
- List of sailing boat types
