= Sun Kiss 45 =

Sailboat class

Development
- Designer: Philippe Briand
- Location: France
- Year: 1983
- Builder: Jeanneau
- Role: Cruiser
- Name: Sun Kiss 45

Boat
- Displacement: 25,312 lb (11,481 kg)
- Draft: 6.50 ft (1.98 m)

Hull
- Type: monohull
- Construction: fiberglass
- LOA: 45.08 ft (13.74 m)
- LWL: 37.25 ft (11.35 m)
- Beam: 14.42 ft (4.40 m)
- Engine: inboard diesel engine

Hull appendages
- Keel: fin keel
- Ballast: 10,304 lb (4,674 kg)
- Rudder: spade-type rudder

Rig
- Rig type: Bermuda rig
- I foretriangle height: 53.50 ft (16.31 m)
- J foretriangle base: 17.20 ft (5.24 m)
- P mainsail luff: 47.30 ft (14.42 m)
- E mainsail foot: 14.90 ft (4.54 m)

Sails
- Sailplan: masthead sloop
- Mainsail area: 352.39 sq ft (32.738 m^{2})
- Jib/genoa area: 460.10 sq ft (42.745 m^{2})
- Total sail area: 812.49 sq ft (75.483 m^{2})

The Sun Kiss 45, originally just called the Sun Kiss, is a French sailboat that was designed by Philippe Briand as a cruiser and first built in 1983. It was the first design in the two-boat Sun Kiss line that also includes the Sun Kiss 47. The Sun Kiss 45 shares a hull design with the Espace 1300.

== Production ==
The design was built by Jeanneau in France, starting in 1983, but it is now out of production.

== Design ==
The Sun Kiss 45 is a recreational keelboat, built predominantly of hand-laid fiberglass, with a balsa-cored deck and a masthead sloop rig. The hull has a raked stem, a reverse transom, an internally mounted spade-type rudder controlled by a wheel and a fixed fin keel or optional stub keel and retractable centerboard. The fin keel version displaces 25,312 lb (11,481 kg) and carries 10,304 lb (4,674 kg) of lead ballast, while the centerboard-equipped model displaces 26,455 lb (12,000 kg).

The fin keel-equipped version of the boat has a draft of 6.50 ft (1.98 m), while the centerboard-equipped version has a draft of 8.83 ft (2.69 m) with the centerboard extended and 5 ft (1.5 m) with it retracted, allowing operation in shallow water.

The boat is fitted with an inboard diesel engine for docking and maneuvering. The fuel tank holds 47 U.S. gallons (180 L; 39 imp gal) and the fresh water tank has a capacity of 138 U.S. gallons (520 L; 115 imp gal).

The design was built with two interior configurations, a four-cabin model for the yacht charter market and a three-cabin version intended for private owners. The two arrangements only differ by the four cabin model dividing the bow cabin into two cabins each with double berths, giving it sleeping accommodation for eight people instead of six. The owner's version has a double berth and sitting room in the bow cabin. Both versions have an L-shaped settee and a straight settee in the main cabin and two aft cabins, each with a double berth. The galley is located on the starboard side admidships and is equipped with a two-burner stove, ice box and a double sink. A navigation station is aft of the galley, on the starboard side. There are two heads, one just forward of the bow cabin in the forepeak and centered in the aft cabin, with individual sinks inside each aft cabin.

For sailing downwind the design may be equipped with a symmetrical spinnaker.

The design has a hull speed of 8.18 kn (15.15 km/h).

== Operational history ==
The Sun Kiss 45 made its public debut at the Paris Boat Show and went on to win first place in Class III of the 1983 Transat en Double, in which competitors race across the Atlantic Ocean with a crew of two sailors.

A 1984 review in Yachting magazine reported, "Her designer, Philippe Briand, gave the Sun Kiss an almost hedonistic beam dimension, so her saloon/galley area is spacious and free of encumbrances. The galley receives an extraordinary space commitment, which is an invitation to enjoy life below. To add to the real space, Jeanneau uses light woods and liners to increase the apparent space. And if that weren’t enough, Briand has shaped the house to allow for two rows of portlights—an incredible 16 in all; with two opening hull ports, a large opening deck hatch and the companionway, this produces the breeziest, brightest living area on any yacht of her size."

In a 1984 Cruising World review stated, "the Sun Kiss is an impressive example of Jeanneau’s consistent ability to incorporate state of the art design and performance with French craftsmanship in the production of quality sailing yachts. Elegance is evident in her graceful lines, luxurious handcrafted teak interior and thoughtfully planned cruiser layout. Her debut at the Paris Boat Show proved her an instant sensation with the yachting world followed by the recently completed 'Transat en Double' (doublehanded transatlantic race) in which she captured honors that confirms she's a true competitor."

== See also ==
- List of sailing boat types
