= Tuide =

South Korean girl group

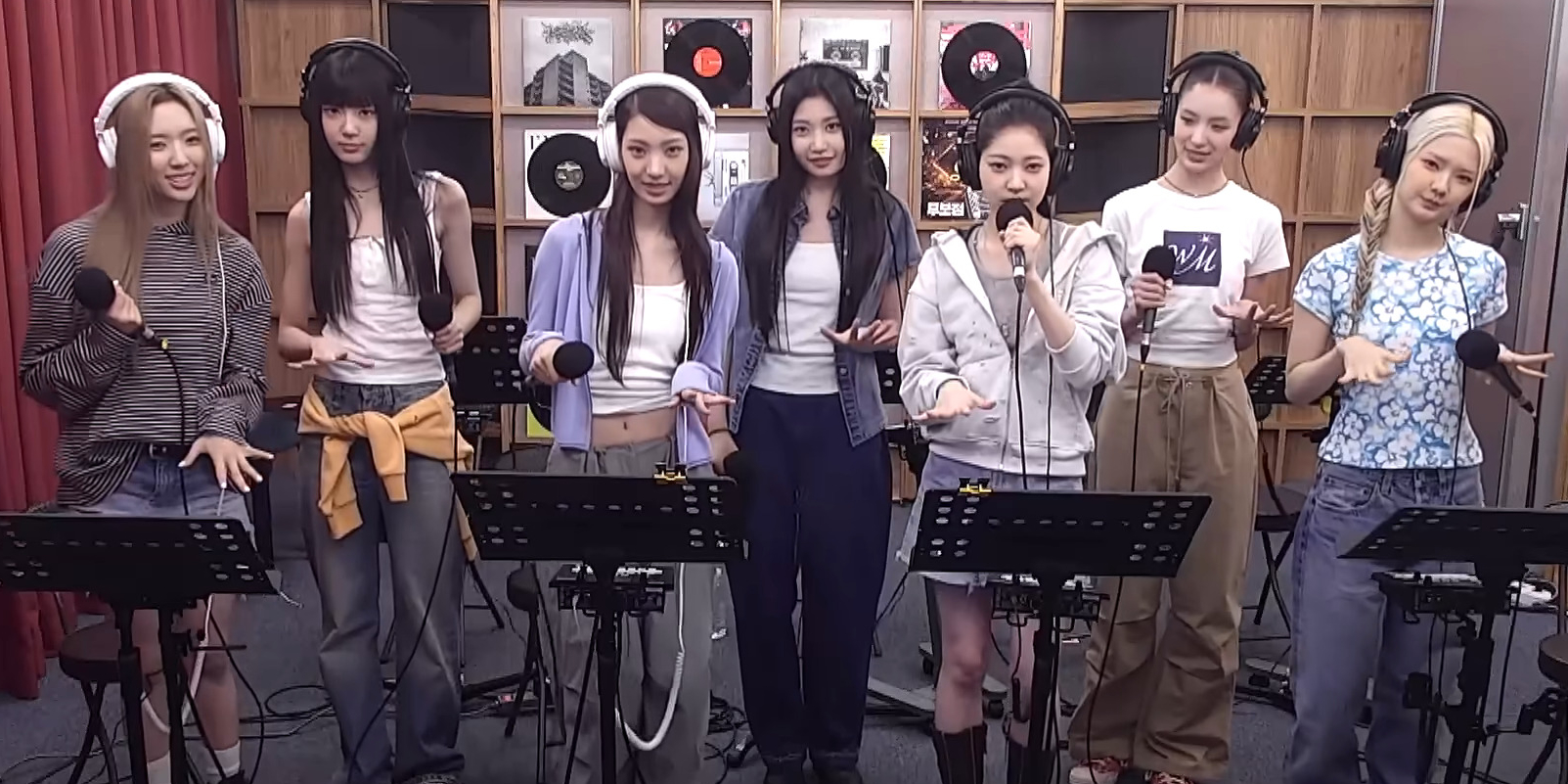
- Tuide in August 2026; L–R: Elena, Seah, Seoyeon, Saki, Jia, Yi Hani, and Seohee

Background information
- Origin: Seoul, South Korea
- Genre: K-pop
- Years active: 2026–present
- Label: ABD
- Members: Seohee; Seoyeon; Elena; Jia; Saki; Seah; Yi Hani
- Website: abolddream.com/en/tuide/profile/

Tuide (/twiːd/; Korean: 튜이드) is a South Korean girl group formed by ABD. Tuide debuted on August 24, 2026, with the extended play Tune & Play.

== Name ==
The group's name came from the phrase "Tune the Tide" and suggests the group's intention to blend members' styles together.

== History ==
Hybe teased a new label dedicated to girl groups titled ABD in May 2026, overseen by music producer Han Sung-soo.

At the beginning of August 2026, the group released a performance of their pre-debut song "Grls" on August 7 and hosted their pre-debut teaser shows in Seoul named "Tuide Exclusive Preview (Playground)", where they performed the songs that were included on their debut EP Tune & Play, and announced its lead single "Sun Kiss".

== Members ==
- Seohee (서희) – leader
- Seoyeon (서연)
- Elena (엘레나)
- Jia (지아)
- Saki (사키)
- Seah (세아)
- Yi Hani (이하늬)

== Discography ==
=== Extended plays ===
List of extended plays, showing selected details, selected chart positions, and sales figures
Title	Details	Peak chart positions						Sales
Title	Details	KOR	BEL (FL)	JPN	JPN Hot	US Sales	US World	Sales
Tune & Play	Released: August 24, 2026; Label: ABD; Formats: CD, digital download, streaming	5	59	39	50	8	3	KOR: 131,851; JPN: 1,421

=== Singles ===
List of singles, showing year released, selected chart positions, and name of the album
Title	Year	Peak chart positions		Album
Title	Year	KOR	JPN Heat.	Album
"Sun Kiss"	2026	54	8	Tune & Play

=== Other charted songs ===
List of other charted songs, showing year released, selected chart positions, and name of the album
Title	Year	Peak chart positions	Album
Title	Year	KOR	Album
"Grls"	2026	84	Tune & Play

== Videography ==
=== Music videos ===
List of music videos, showing year released, and name of the director(s)
Title	Year	Director(s)	Ref.
"Sun Kiss"	2026	Oui Kim	

== Live performances ==
=== Award shows ===
Event	Date	Venue	City	Country	Performed song(s)	Ref.
2026 Korea Grand Music Awards	November 7, 2026	Gocheok Sky Dome	Seoul	South Korea	"Grls"; "Sun Kiss"	
2026 Melon Music Awards	November 14, 2026	Gocheok Sky Dome	Seoul	South Korea	"Grls"; "Sun Kiss"	
2026 MAMA Awards	November 20, 2026	Kyocera Dome Osaka	Osaka	Japan	TBA	
11th Asia Artist Awards	December 6, 2026	National Stadium	Kaohsiung	Taiwan	TBA	

== Accolades ==
=== Awards and nominations ===
Name of the award ceremony, year presented, category, nominee of the award, and the result of the nomination
Award ceremony	Year	Category	Nominee / work	Result	Ref.
Korea Grand Music Awards	2026	IS Rising Star	Tuide	Won	
Korea Grand Music Awards	2026	Global Fan Choice	Tuide	Nominated	
MAMA Awards	2026	Artist of The Year	Tuide	Nominated	
MAMA Awards	2026	Best New Artist	Tuide	Won	
MAMA Awards	2026	Top 10 Fans' Choice - Female	Tuide	Won	
Melon Music Awards	2026	Global Rising Artist	Tuide	Won	
Melon Music Awards	2026	Best New Artist	Tuide	Nominated	
