= Hybe =

South Korean multinational corporation

Hybe Co., Ltd.
- Logo as of May 2026

- Symbol as of May 2026
- Native name: 하이브
- Formerly: The Big Hit Entertainment Co., Ltd. (Note: February 4–23, 2005); Big Hit Entertainment Co., Ltd. (Note: February 24, 2005 – March 30, 2021)
- Type: Public
- Traded as: KRX: 352820
- Industry: Music; entertainment; technology
- Founded: February 4, 2005; 21 years ago
- Founder: Bang Si-hyuk
- Headquarters: 42 Hangang-daero, Yongsan-gu, Seoul (Hangangno 3-ga, Yongsan Trade Center), South Korea
- Area served: Worldwide
- Key people: Bang Si-hyuk (Chairman); Jason Jaesang Lee (CEO); Lee Kyung-jun (CFO); Jung Jin-soo (CLO); Park Tae-hee (CCO); Kim Jung-yoon (CSO)
- Services: Music production, publishing, and artist development and management; Event organization, IP, and technological platform
- Revenue: ▲ ₩2.66 trillion (US$1.98 billion) (2025)
- Net income: ▼ ₩254.4 billion (US$189.81 million) (2025)
- Total assets: ▲ ₩5.46 billion (US$4.07 million) (2025)
- Total equity: ▲ ₩3.55 billion (US$2.65 million) (2025)
- Owner: Bang Si-hyuk (28.4%); Netmarble (7.1%); National Pension Service (6.6%); Dunamu (5.3%) (Note: Pending sale to Naver's subsidiary, Naver Financial.); Others (50.9%)
- Number of employees: 893 (2026)
- Divisions: Hybe HBS; Hybe IPX; Hybe NEB
- Subsidiaries: See subsidiaries
- Website: hybecorp.com

Hybe Co., Ltd. (Korean: 주식회사 하이브), commonly known as Hybe (Korean: 하이브; stylized in all caps), is a South Korean multinational music corporation and conglomerate headquartered in Seoul. Founded as Big Hit Entertainment in 2005 by Bang Si-hyuk, the company began as a music production and artist management agency. In March 2021, it adopted the Hybe name following a corporate restructuring that expanded its business beyond its original record label operations.

Hybe operates a multi-label system, with subsidiaries and affiliated companies managing artists and producing music in South Korea and overseas. Its labels include BigHit Music, Pledis Entertainment, Source Music, Koz Entertainment, Belift Lab and ADOR, alongside its international operations through Hybe Americas and Hybe Japan. Notable artists associated with the company include BTS, Tomorrow X Together, Seventeen, Enhypen, Le Sserafim, NewJeans, BoyNextDoor, TWS, Illit, Cortis, and Tuide.

Beyond music production and artist management, Hybe has interests in concert promotion, merchandise, intellectual property licensing, video production, gaming, and digital services. Its businesses also include the global fan platform Weverse, which provides artist-related content, fan communication and e-commerce services. Hybe has established operations and partnerships in several international markets, including the United States, Japan, Latin America, China and India. Its overseas expansion is guided by its "Multi-home, Multi-genre" strategy, which involves developing local operations and artist rosters while maintaining a global business network.

== History ==
=== 2005–2021: Big Hit Entertainment Co., Ltd. ===
Big Hit Entertainment was founded on February 1, 2005, and signed the vocal trio 8Eight in 2007. In 2010, the company signed a contract with JYP Entertainment to jointly manage the boy group 2AM. That year, Bang Si-hyuk signed RM as the first member of BTS and launched nationwide auditions to recruit other members for the group. BTS made their debut under Big Hit on June 13, 2013.

In 2012, the company signed Lim Jeong-hee, and formed the girl group Glam as a collaboration with Source Music. The group was active until 2014, when it was disbanded due to legal actions against one of its members Kim Da-hee. Kim was sentenced to prison after being found guilty of blackmailing actor Lee Byung-hun.

Following the end of the joint contract between Big Hit and JYP in April 2014, three members of 2AM returned to JYP. Lee Chang-min remained with Big Hit to continue with his solo career and as part of the duo Homme. 8Eight disbanded later that year, after Baek Chan and Joo Hee's contracts with Big Hit ended.

In May 2015, Lim parted ways with the agency, following the expiration of her three-year contract, and Signal Entertainment Group, a KOSDAQ-listed company specializing in artist management and television production, acquired stakes in Big Hit through a ₩6 billion (US$4.48 million) convertible bond. In early 2016, Big Hit ended their stake relationship with Signal and made a full settlement of the bonds.

In February 2018, Homme disbanded after member Changmin's contract ended. He left the company to start his own agency, while Lee Hyun continued on as a solo artist. In August, Big Hit and CJ ENM released information stating plans to create a joint entertainment agency, with ownership split 52% to the latter and 48% to the former. Filed under the name Belift Lab, the agency debuted its first boy group Enhypen in November 2020. In October, BTS renewed and extended their contract with the agency for seven more years. Big Hit was voted Best Investment Company of the Year at the 2018 Korea VC Awards in December.

Big Hit debuted its second male group, Tomorrow X Together (TXT), in March 2019. Also that month, former CBO Lenzo Yoon was appointed co-CEO alongside Bang. Yoon would focus on the business components of the company, while Bang's focus would be on creative production. In July 2019, the company acquired Source Music, and in August, the video game firm Superb. Thanks to the Weverse and Weverse Shop (Note: formerly Weply prior to March 9, 2020) apps developed by its subsidiary beNX, Big Hit was named the fourth most innovative company of 2020 worldwide by Fast Company.

In May 2020, the company became the majority shareholder of Pledis Entertainment. The label would retain its independence; however, its artists would now receive greater financial support and global promotions. The Fair Trade Commission (KFTC) approved the acquisition in October. Big Hit acquired KOZ Entertainment, a record label founded by rapper Zico, the following month.

In January 2021, news media reported that Big Hit and beNX had invested a combined ₩70 billion (US$52.23 million) in YG Plus, acquiring a 17.9% stake in the company in a merchandising and distribution deal that would see YG Plus' artists join the Weverse social media and shop platforms. Naver Corporation later invested ₩354.8 billion (US$264.72 million) in beNX, acquiring 49% of the subsidiary. In return, it transferred its V Live video streaming service to the latter for the development of a new integrated fan community platform. BeNX was eventually renamed Weverse Company. The merger was approved by the KFTC in May.

On February 17, Big Hit and Universal Music Group (UMG) announced a strategic partnership between the two companies to collaborate on various music and technology-related endeavors. At the forefront of the partnership was a joint venture between Big Hit and Interscope Geffen A&M's Geffen Records, one of UMG's flagship labels, with plans to debut a global boy group through a new, Los Angeles-based label following a global audition program set to air in 2022. Big Hit would be responsible for selecting and training the artists, while UMG would be in charge of music production, global distribution, and marketing. Additionally, other UMG artists were set to join Weverse, already home to Gracie Abrams, New Hope Club, and Alexander 23. On February 25, Big Hit announced a ₩4 billion (US$2.98 million) investment in a Korea-based AI company, Supertone, that specializes in creating hyper-realistic voices using technology.

=== 2021–present: Hybe, expansions, internal issues, and investigations ===
Big Hit announced its rebranding into an entertainment lifestyle platform company under the name Hybe in March 2021. The company underwent a complete organisational restructuring, which also saw the recording and management arm of Big Hit Entertainment spun off into an independent label named BigHit Music under Hybe's new Labels division. The renaming was approved at a shareholders meeting on March 30. The company relocated to its new headquarters in the Yongsan Trade Center in Yongsan District on March 22, and the rebrand went into effect on March 31. Hybe acquired Scooter Braun's Ithaca Holdings and all its properties, including SB Projects (Note: manages artists such as Justin Bieber and Ariana Grande) and Big Machine Label Group, through its subsidiary Hybe America (Note: Though corporate filing documentation uses the name "Big Hit America" it is Hybe America being referenced. News outlets interchangeably use "Big Hit America" and "Hybe America" to refer to the company acquiring Ithaca for Hybe Corp, indicating that they are one and the same. This article hereinafter uses Hybe America only.) in April. The corporation invested ₩1.07 trillion (US$798.34 million) into the America branch to finance the buyout; $1.05 billion was paid to Ithaca shareholders and bondholders. BH Odyssey Merger Sub, a newly created subsidiary of Hybe America, facilitated the acquisition, and was later dissolved after the deal's finalization. The Carlyle Group, a minority shareholder and original investor, sold its stake in Ithaca as part of the deal. Braun joined Hybe's board, while Scott Borchetta retained his position as CEO of Big Machine Label Group. That same month, Time named Hybe one of the "100 Most Influential Companies of 2021", under the "Pioneers" section.

Japanese streaming platform Showroom announced a business and capital partnership with Hybe in May 2021 to improve its domestic services and expand access to Japanese content in South Korea, the United States, and globally. Hybe was added to the MSCI Korea index on May 12, and the index updated on May 28. Following a second organizational restructuring, Bang resigned as CEO on July 1 to return his focus to music production. He was replaced by Jiwon Park but retained his position as chairman of the board of directors. In November, Hybe entered into an equity-based partnership with Korean fintech company Dunamu to develop a joint venture NFT business for the creation of digital assets. It acquired a 2.6% stake in the company for ₩500 billion (US$373.06 million), while Dunamu received a 5.6% stake in Hybe for ₩700 billion (US$522.28 million). On November 11, Hybe won a Red Dot Design Award in the Brands & Communication Design category at the 2021 Red Dot Design Awards for its new corporate identity (CI) design. (Note: revealed in March by then-CBO Min Hee-jin during the rebrand announcement) The establishment of a new music label, ADOR, (Note: acronym for "All doors, one room") was announced on November 12. Chief brand officer (CBO) Min Hee-jin was appointed as its president and tasked with overseeing the management of the label's first girl group, (Note: members were selected through the "Plus Global Audition" held in 2019) later announced as NewJeans, which debuted in July 2022.

In January 2022, the company published a series of "original stories" featuring boy groups BTS, Enhypen, and Tomorrow X Together in collaboration with Webtoon and Wattpad as part of a planned IP expansion. The BTS comic alone earned over 15 million views within two days of release, becoming the fastest title in Webtoon's history to reach that milestone. In March, Fast Company named Hybe the 11th most innovative company of the year globally on its annual top-50 list—ranking first in the Media category—while Time included Hybe on its 100 Most Influential Companies list for a second consecutive year. The company topped the "Leaders" category and was dubbed "The Pop Powerhouse" by the outlet for its acquisitions, expansion into the digital frontier, and transformative strides in the music industry during the pandemic era. The following month, Hybe won an iF Product Design Award for "Company Branding" in the Communication category at the International Forum Design Awards held in Germany. Hybe signed a multi-year deal with The Walt Disney Company Asia Pacific in July 2022 to provide content showcasing the Korean music and entertainment industries to a global market. Five programs will be available worldwide on Disney+ and other Disney streaming platforms—a 4K cinematic film of BTS' Permission to Dance on Stage concert in Los Angeles; In the Soop: Friendcation; and BTS Monuments: Beyond the Star, a docuseries of BTS' history from debut to present set to premiere in 2023. Additional content featuring other Hybe artists will also be released.

Hybe became the largest shareholder of SM Entertainment in February 2023, after it acquired founder Lee Soo-man's 14.8% stake in the company for approximately ₩422.8 billion (US$315.46 million). The company subsequently acquired Galaxia SM's 1% stake on March 3. On March 12, Hybe announced that they no longer planned to own the majority stakes of SM Entertainment, said that the bidding war with Kakao could "damage shareholder value." On March 24, Hybe announced that it will sell its entire stake in SM Entertainment to Kakao by accepting its tender offer launched by Kakao. However, on March 28, Hybe instead sold half of its stakes in SM to Kakao, leaving it only for 8.81%. On May 27, 2025, Hybe announced it would sell all of its shares in SM Entertainment to Tencent Music.

In May, Hybe entered into a music distribution and strategic cooperation agreement with China's Tencent Music Entertainment. Under the agreement, music by Hybe artists became available on Tencent Music's streaming platforms, including QQ Music, KuGou Music, Kuwo Music and WeSing. The partnership covered music copyright and artist promotion and expanded Hybe's distribution presence in China, a market that had been difficult for South Korean entertainment companies to access following tensions between South Korea and China.

In August, the company agreed to acquire CJ ENM's 51.5% stake in Belift Lab for ₩150 billion (US$111.92 million), making Belift Lab a wholly owned subsidiary of it. The transaction was completed on 1 September 2023.

In November, Hybe strengthened its global expansion strategy by acquiring Exile Music, the Latin music label affiliated with Spanish-language entertainment company Exile Content. The deal marked the company's entry into the Latin music market and led to the creation of Hybe Latin America, a Mexico-based division designed to develop artists and content for the region.

In August 2024, ADOR, Hybe's label for NewJeans, replaced its chief executive officer, Min Hee-jin, with then-CHRO and board member, Kim Ju-young, amid an ongoing dispute between Min and itself. Min remained on ADOR's board and was initially announced as continuing to produce music for NewJeans, while ADOR separated its production and management functions. Hybe, which holds 80% of ADOR, had previously gained control of the label's board by appointing three directors at a May 2024 shareholders' meeting. Min disputed her removal as a unilateral dismissal and argued that it violated her shareholders' agreement with Hybe.

In December, South Korea's Financial Supervisory Service began investigating Hybe chairman Bang Si-hyuk over shareholder agreements made before the company's 2020 initial public offering. According to reports, the agreements with three private equity funds allowed the funds to sell shares following the IPO while entitling Bang to 30% of their profits. The company stated that the agreements had been provided to the IPO underwriters and denied wrongdoing. In May 2025, the Financial Supervisory Service reportedly decided to refer Bang Si-hyuk to prosecutors over allegations that he had misled early Hybe shareholders before the company's 2020 IPO. The allegations concerned statements made in 2019 about the company's plans to go public and Bang's subsequent receipt of a share of profits from private equity investors. The company maintained that the transactions were conducted lawfully and with legal oversight. On 29 May 2025, prosecutors investigated a Hybe employee over suspected insider trading and searched the company's headquarters. The investigation concerned allegations that the employee had used non-public information relating to the company's business before trading shares.

On May 28, 2025, Hybe America sold Big Machine Rock, a Nashville-based rock label and imprint of Big Machine Label Group, to Gebbia Media, a subsidiary of Siebert Financial. Scott Borchetta, founder of Big Machine Label Group, continued overseeing the label's operations, while general manager Heather Luke-Husong remained in her position. The label's artists also remained with the company following the sale. The transaction came after Hybe's 2021 acquisition of Big Machine Label Group through its purchase of Ithaca Holdings for approximately US$1.05 billion.

On May 29, Hybe announced the establishment of Hybe China, a Beijing-based subsidiary that had commenced operations on April 2. It became the company's fourth overseas subsidiary, following those in Japan, the United States, and Latin America. The subsidiary was established to support the activities and expansion of Hybe's artists in China. The company said it had no immediate plans to launch a China-based idol group or audition programme, instead prioritising activities by its existing artists.

On July 1, Hybe announced plans to expand its operations into India. The company subsequently established a subsidiary in the country on September 23.

In July, Netmarble, one of Hybe's largest shareholders, considered issuing approximately ₩2.5 trillion (US$1.87 billion) in exchangeable bonds (EB), using part of its Hybe stake as collateral. The proposed financing was intended to help repay loans taken out to fund its acquisition of U.S. social casino game company SpinX. Although no formal underwriting agreement had been signed, NH Investment & Securities was considered a potential arranger for the issuance. NH Hedge Asset Management was also reportedly preparing a project fund with institutional investors to support the transaction. Netmarble had previously used its Hybe holdings to raise funds, including through a 2024 price return swap involving 2.6% of its equity and a 2023 block trade covering approximately 6% of its shares.

By August, Netmarble had abandoned the proposed bond issuance. Thebell attributed the decision to volatility in Hybe's share price and its sharp decline following a scandal involving the company's founder and chairman, Bang Si-hyuk. The proposed fundraising had been intended to reduce debt associated with the SpinX acquisition, which amounted to approximately ₩1.6 trillion (US$1.19 billion). The outstanding debt had subsequently fallen to the mid-₩200 billion (US$149.22 million) range.

On August 20, Mirae Asset Securities was preparing to sell the remaining portion of Hybe's convertible bonds (CBs), valued at approximately ₩1 trillion (US$746.11 million). Hybe's share price had recently risen to around ₩280,000 (US$208.91), above the bonds' conversion price of ₩218,000. Issued in October 2024 as zero-coupon bonds, the CBs had initially been underwritten primarily by Mirae Asset, although some remained unsold amid concerns over the transaction's structure and allegations of preferential treatment. Thebell reported that the rise in Hybe's share price, alongside expectations surrounding BTS's return and the easing of Chinese content restrictions, had improved the prospects of selling the remaining bonds at a profit. On the same day, ADOR appointed Lee Do-kyung as its new president. He succeeded the previous leadership arrangement established after former president Min Hee-jin's dismissal in 2024, during which Kim Joo-young served as interim president. Lee had worked at Hybe since 2019 and had experience in strategic planning and intellectual property projects. His appointment followed a period of organisational restructuring under the interim leadership.

In December, the company announced a global management partnership with Brandon Hixon and Colin Gayle, the managers of South African singer Tyla, to develop African artists for international markets. Under the partnership, Hixon and Gayle would lead the artist-development initiative, while the company would provide support in areas including touring, marketing, digital strategy, multimedia production and brand partnerships. Tyla became the first artist supported under the initiative while remaining managed by Hixon and Gayle.

In May 2026, Hybe introduced a new corporate identity and mission statement, adopting "Discover a New Universe, Unlock an Immersive Journey" as its official mission while retaining "We believe in Music" as an internal principle. The rebranding focused on immersive fan experiences across its content and services. It also changed its logo guidelines, allowing the wordmark and its derived "H" symbol to appear independently.

On May 15, Hybe announced the departure of former chief human resources officer (CHRO) Kim Joo-young. An earlier regulatory filing had shown that her shareholding, along with those of former Hybe America CEO Scooter Braun and former Hybe Latin America CEO Kah Jong-hyun, had fallen to zero. Braun's departure from the company's board was subsequently reported on July 1, although he was expected to remain as an adviser.

In June, the company announced a partnership with Japanese music production company INCS.together to launch Girls Archives, a five-member Japanese-Korean girl group featuring real-world performers and virtual characters connected through a transmedia storyline. Hybe's Next Entertainment Business (NEB) division supported the development of the group's concept and storyline, while INCS.together served as the project's lead production company.

On July 23, Hybe announced that its subsidiary Supertone would be dissolved following a resolution passed at an extraordinary shareholders' meeting on July 15. Despite the dissolution, some of Supertone's operations were set to continue under a new operating company. Its AI voice services Shift, Clear, and Air were to be transferred to the new company, with existing licences and purchased voices remaining valid. However, Play, the Supertone API, and Voice Builder were discontinued.

On October 27, Hybe America announced the launch of TRU Records, a Latin music label joining Hybe's roster of labels focused on the Latin American market. Its first artist was Santos Bravos. On the same day, Hybe established Global Label Services, an organisation responsible for supporting its labels with marketing, distribution, and promotional activities. Hybe America's CIPO, Juan S. Arenas named as president; Nicole Savay appointed Senior Vice President (SVP) of Global Distribution; Melissa Victor-Burkhart appointed Executive Vice President (EVP) overseeing Global Artist Services; Joana Fuentes to handle artist public relations for the organisation; and Jenny Peff, previously CPTO of Hybe America and Hybe Latin America, appointed to the newly created position of Chief People and Transformation Officer (CPTO) of the organisation. The appointments followed Mohnish Sani's appointment as head of strategy and growth at Hybe Americas on October 15.

Later that day, the company announced plans to transfer its entire 2.47% stake in Dunamu, valued at approximately ₩378.2 billion (US$282.18 million), to Hybe America in exchange for newly issued shares. The transaction is scheduled for completion on November 30. Hybe also stated that the Dunamu shares were expected to be exchanged for Naver Financial shares as part of a planned transaction in March 2027. Separately, Momentica, an NFT platform jointly operated by Hybe and Dunamu, was disclosed to have ceased operations in July 2025.

On November 12, Hybe was reported to be considering a bid for HLL Joongang, the South Korean publisher of Elle, Cosmopolitan, Esquire and Harper's Bazaar, as well as the organiser of the Baeksang Arts Awards and Golden Disc Awards. The deal is reportedly valued at around ₩50 billion (US$37.31 million).

On November 16, Hybe appointed Kim Jung-yoon as its chief strategy officer (CSO), filling a position that had remained vacant for more than two years. Kim previously held the same role at Yanolja's Enterprise Solutions division, having joined the company in 2021 after approximately six years at McKinsey & Company.. On the same day, the company announced The Wildcard Club, a virtual music project featuring creators and developed by its newly-established subsidiary, New Epic Base (NEB). The group brings together four Western virtual creators, AmaLee, Dokibird, Ironmouse and Rin Penrose, who have a combined YouTube following of approximately 6.2 million subscribers. Their debut single, "Click Flick," is set for release on November 20, with all four creators contributing vocals, which the project also plans to bring emerging creators together in teams to develop original music, with the process documented in videos on YouTube.

On November 17, Hybe announced a partnership with American talent agency Creative Artists Agency (CAA) to expand commercial opportunities for its artists and intellectual property. The agreement covers content, brand partnerships, sports, licensing, merchandising and live events. The companies also plan to pursue joint business initiatives in South Korea, Japan, the Americas, China and India. The announcement followed a meeting between Hybe chairman Bang Si-hyuk and CAA chief executive and co-chairman Bryan Lourd at the HYBE Global Leadership Summit on November 13. On the same day, Tencent Music Entertainment (TME) announced that it had renewed its partnership with Hybe, extending a 30-day early-release window for selected new music from the company. TME executive chairman Cussion Pang confirmed the deal during the company's third-quarter 2026 earnings call, with further details included in its financial results. The renewed agreement gives TME continued access to early releases from Hybe artists as it expands its K-pop catalogue and partnerships with South Korean entertainment companies.

On November 18, Hybe announced that its Japanese subsidiary, Hybe Japan, had acquired 50.10% of entertainment company KeyHolder, which operates across music, artist management, television and film production, advertising and digital content, which will give the subsidiary a greater profile in Japan as the acquired company includes a 50% stake in the operating company of girl group Nogizaka46 and management of girl group SKE48. KeyHolder also represents rock band Novelbright and actor Hiroshi Tamaki. Hybe plans to bring KeyHolder's artist management and production operations together with its own artist development capabilities, international network and fan platform Weverse.

== Company value and investments ==
Big Hit Entertainment initially operated as a private company with Bang Si-hyuk as the largest shareholder of its stock. In 2018, the Korean mobile gaming company Netmarble acquired the second largest percentage of the company, paying a reported ₩201.4 billion (US$150.27 million) for 25.71%. In October 2018, private investment firm STIC Investments received an undisclosed share of Big Hit for an investment of roughly ₩104 billion (US$77.6 million).

In 2007, Big Hit had four employees and was near bankruptcy, but Bang was able to keep the company afloat after the local success of 8Eight's Without a Heart in 2009. Over the years, its value rose in tandem with the increasing global popularity of its first boy group BTS. In March 2018, Big Hit's earnings were publicized for the first time. The company reported revenue of ₩92.4 billion (US$68.94 million) and operating profit of ₩32.5 billion (US$24.25 million) for 2017. Initial estimates valued Big Hit at up to ₩700 billion (US$522.28 million) if entered into an IPO that very month, making CEO Bang the richest in the South Korean entertainment business due to his large shareholding position, and leaving him with personal ownership value of roughly ₩350 billion (US$261.14 million). By October 2018, the company was valued at more than ₩1 trillion (US$746.11 million).

Big Hit's success has been attributed to its innovative management style, more like an IT company than an entertainment company, which has become the new standard in the K-pop industry; it includes a wide usage of social media to capture people's interest and transform it into sales, the creation of artist-related multimedia content, and the full use of fandom energy. Financials published in March 2019 for 2018, showed a 132% increase in sales compared to 2017, with Big Hit making approximately ₩214.2 billion (US$159.82 million). Operating profit rose 97% to ₩64.1 billion (US$47.83 million), while net profit rose 105% to ₩50.2 billion (US$37.45 million). By June 2019, the company was valued between ₩1.28 trillion (US$955.03 million) and ₩2.22 trillion (US$1.66 billion) As of March 2020, its total value was roughly ₩6 trillion (US$4.48 billion). Big Hit commenced plans to go public on May 21, and applied for a pre-IPO consultation with the Korea Exchange. This is required under South Korean law before a company can file paperwork for an IPO. One week later, the company filed for a preliminary review of their planned IPO. On October 15, Big Hit was listed in the KOSPI index and began trading stocks.

Per the company's 2020 annual report, its first since going public, Big Hit recorded net income of ₩86.2 billion (US$64.32 million), a 19.1% increase compared to 2019's ₩72.4 billion (US$54.02 million) Operating profit rose 44.3% to ₩142.4 billion (US$106.25 million), while sales increased 35.6% to ₩796.3 billion (US$594.13 million)—bolstered in part by album revenue and various acquisitions—with the company experiencing its best quarterly performance yet in the fourth quarter of 2020. Though concert revenue decreased in the wake of the COVID-19 pandemic, merchandise, content, and fan club-related revenue increased 53%, 71%, and 66%, respectively. In 2021, following its rebranding as Hybe, the company became the first South Korean music agency to surpass the ₩1 trillion (US$746.11 million) benchmark in annual sales. It recorded annual revenue of ₩1.2 trillion (US$895.34 million) operating profit of ₩190.3 billion (US$141.99 million), and net income of ₩141 trillion (US$105.2 billion).

== Corporate structure, governance, and significant holdings ==
=== Affiliate structure and governance disclosures ===
According to Hybe's 2026 large-scale business group disclosure filed with the Korea Fair Trade Commission, the group comprised 77 domestic and overseas affiliates as of May 2026. Its operations spanned South Korea, Japan, China, the United States, Mexico, India and Singapore.

The filing listed several newly established affiliates, including Hybe India Entertainment Private Limited, Jconic Inc., NFO, LLC, Truvatos S de RL de CV and Pase A La Fama S de RL de CV. In March 2026, Hybe also established ABD Co., Ltd., a South Korean music label led by former Pledis executive Noh Ji-won.

Hybe's domestic non-financial affiliates employed a combined 2,305 people. The largest subsidiaries by workforce were Hybe (908 employees), Weverse Company (436), Drimage (311), BigHit Music (174) and Pledis Entertainment (143).

Several overseas subsidiaries also changed their names. Hybe IM Japan Inc. became Drimage Japan Inc., while Xing Can Sheng Shi (Beijing) Entertainment Co., Ltd. was renamed Pledis China Co., Ltd.

=== Corporate governance and management ===
Hybe's 2026 first-quarter filing recorded the appointment of Isaac Lee, CEO and chairman of Hybe America, and Kevin Mayer, co-CEO of Candle Media and former CEO of TikTok, as internal directors.

Other outside directors appointed during 2025 and 2026 included economist Lee Sang-seung, law professor Cho Won-kyung, former vice minister Baek Seung-joo and finance executive Han Chang-soo.

The filing also identified the chief executives of Hybe's subsidiaries, including:

- Shin Sun-jung, CEO of BigHit Music
- Kim Yeon-soo, CEO of Pledis Entertainment
- Kim Joo-young, CEO of Source Music
- Kim Tae-ho, CEO of Belift Lab
- Lee Do-kyung, CEO of ADOR
- Lee Chang-woo, CEO of KOZ Entertainment
- Choi Jun-won, CEO of Weverse Company
- Noh Ji-won, CEO of ABD Co., Ltd.

Several senior executives also held positions across multiple affiliates. These included CFO Lee Kyung-joon and CLO Jung Jin-soo, who served concurrently on subsidiary boards.

=== Financial and operational information ===
At the end of fiscal year 2025, Hybe's parent-company separate financial statements reported assets of approximately ₩3.73 trillion (US$2.78 billion) and equity of ₩2.66 trillion (US$1.98 billion).

The financial results of selected subsidiaries included:

- BigHit Music: revenue of ₩437.5 billion (US$326.43 million) and operating profit of ₩47.9 billion (US$35.74 million).
- Belift Lab: revenue of ₩154.7 billion (US$115.42 million) and operating profit of ₩49.9 billion (US$37.23 million).
- Pledis Entertainment: revenue of ₩288.5 billion (US$215.25 million) and operating profit of ₩69.7 billion (US$52 million).
- Weverse Company: revenue of ₩299.7 billion (US$223.61 million) and operating profit of ₩2 billion (US$1.49 million).

During 2025 and 2026, Hybe's board approved restricted stock unit (RSU) grants, intercompany loans, share acquisitions, the establishment of subsidiaries and extensions of credit agreements.

=== Shareholding and ownership ===
==== Major shareholders and related parties ====
As of May 21, 2026, Bang Si-hyuk held 12,247,734 Hybe shares, representing 28.42% of the company's voting shares. Other major shareholders included Netmarble Co., Ltd., with 3,050,813 shares (7.08%), and Dunamu Co., Ltd., with 2,302,570 shares (5.34%). The National Pension Service held 3,541,084 shares (8.2%), according to Hybe's quarterly filing.

Among Hybe executives, CEO Lee Jae-sang held 32,040 shares (0.07%). Kim Tae-ho held 21,314 shares, Jung Jin-soo held 14,401 shares and Han Hyun-rok held 16,468 shares. Lee Kyung-joon, Lee Da-hye, Han Sung-soo, Lee Ga-jun, Choi Jun-won, Shin Sun-jung and Jung Woo-yong each held fewer than 5,000 shares. As of March 31, 2026, former executives Scott Samuel Braun, Kah Jong-hyun and Kim Joo-young no longer held shares.

On May 20, 2026, Bang Si-hyuk donated 192,126 Hybe common shares to the company for use in employee and executive compensation programmes across Hybe and its affiliates. The shares were valued at ₩45.15 billion (US$33.69 million) based on the closing price before the board resolution.

Bang had previously donated 546,120 shares on March 31, 2026, valued at ₩209.16 billion (US$156.06 million). The shares were also intended for employee and executive compensation.

==== Shareholder agreements and other arrangements ====
Bang Si-hyuk, Netmarble and Dunamu were parties to shareholder agreements covering the joint exercise of voting rights, including matters relating to director appointments, mergers and acquisitions.

Bang also pledged 640,000 Hybe shares as collateral for loans from Nonghyup Bank. The loans carried a weighted average interest rate of 3.8% and had maturity dates ranging from May 31, 2025 to March 31, 2027.

Netmarble held exchangeable bonds linked to 528,576 Hybe shares. The bonds were issued on November 19, 2025 and are scheduled to mature on November 19, 2030.

In total, 18,769,693 shares, representing 43.55% of Hybe's equity, were subject to contractual arrangements.

=== Executive remuneration and stock-based compensation ===
As of 31 March 2026, Hybe's board of directors comprised chairman Bang Si-hyuk, CEO Lee Jae-sang and outside directors Kim Byung-kyu, Park Young-ho, Lee Mi-kyung, Lee Sang-seung, Baek Seung-joo and Cho Won-kyung.

Unregistered executives included former COO Kim Tae-ho, CCO Park Tae-hee, CFO Lee Kyung-joon, HBS President Lee Seung-seok, CAMO Kim Shin-gyu and CLO Jung Jin-soo.

Shareholders approved a total remuneration limit of ₩5 billion (US$3.73 million) for nine registered directors. During the reporting period, seven directors and auditors received a combined ₩1.97 billion (US$1.47 million), averaging ₩282 million (US$210,404.42) per person. This included ₩1.59 billion (US$1.19 million) for registered directors excluding outside directors and audit committee members, ₩150 million (US$111,917.25) for outside directors and ₩231 million (US$172,352.56) for audit committee members.

CEO Lee Jae-sang received ₩1.65 billion (US$1.23 million) in total compensation. The five highest-paid executives and directors were Lee Jae-sang, Park Tae-hee, Shin Young-jae, Lee Kyung-joon and Jung Jin-soo.

Hybe's stock-based compensation programme included stock options valued at ₩5.32 billion (US$3.97 million) for seven recipients. Its RSU programme, introduced in 2024, distributed 158,640 shares to 2,122 employees and executives during 2025. During the same year, 13,088 RSUs vested for 31 recipients, while 590 were cancelled. A further 208,342 unvested RSUs remained outstanding as of December 31, 2025.

In April 2026, Hybe also granted treasury stock bonuses to several executives at affiliated companies, including Kim Tae-ho, Jung Jin-soo, Han Hyun-rok, Choi Jun-won, Shin Sun-jung and Jung Woo-yong. Some of these individuals were subsequently listed as specially related parties in Hybe's shareholding disclosures.

== Pillars and subsidiaries ==
Hybe consists of three pillars: Music, Platform, and Technology. Under each division are wholly or partially owned subsidiaries of its parent corporation. As of 2026, the company has 85 subsidiaries in total.

=== Music ===
This is the entertainment and music production division. Formerly branded as Big Hit Labels and Hybe Labels, it was later scrapped as a brand as of May 2026, as a part of a wider rebranding of the company. Subsidiaries within the division are creatively and operationally independent, yet are overseen by either the CLO or CFO of Hybe as internal directors.

==== Hybe ====
- BigHit Music
  - Lee Hyun
  - BTS
    - RM
    - Agust D
    - J-Hope
    - Jin
    - Jimin
    - Jung Kook
    - V
  - Tomorrow X Together
    - Yeonjun
    - Beomgyu
  - Cortis
- Source Music
  - Le Sserafim
- Belift Lab (Note: formerly a joint venture with CJ ENM Entertainment Division)
  - Enhypen
  - Illit
  - Evan
- Pledis Entertainment
  - Seventeen
    - BSS
    - JxW
    - HxW
    - CxM
    - DxS
    - V8
    - The8
    - Dino
  - Hwang Min-hyun
  - Bumzu
  - TWS
- KOZ Entertainment
  - Zico
  - BoyNextDoor
- ADOR
  - NewJeans
- ABD
  - Tuide
- NEWEPICBASE
  - The Wildcard Club (creative support) (Note: Independent VTuber music project with creative support from HYBE.)

===== Former artists =====
- ADOR
  - Danielle
- Pledis Entertainment
  - NU'EST
  - Fromis 9
- Source Music
  - GFriend

==== Hybe Americas ====
Prior to the rebrand, the subsidiary was known as Big Hit America. Following the rebranding, Hybe bought over all ₩1.7 trillion (US$1.27 billion) of Big Hit America's shares, making it a wholly owned subsidiary under the corporation, and it became Hybe America. This was in preparation for Hybe's acquisition of Ithaca Holdings through Hybe America. BH Odyssey Merger Sub was created as a subsidiary of Hybe America to facilitate its buyout of Ithaca. Once finalized, Ithaca would become a subsidiary of Hybe America, and BH Odyssey would be dissolved. The merger is assumed to have been completed in the first quarter of 2021 per quarterly earning reports published on May 14.

In July 2021, Yoon and Braun were appointed co-CEOs of Hybe America, and jointly managed US operations. Yoon was responsible for "the localization of Hybe's K-pop business model in the US" and "oversee[ing] the training, production and marketing process through which new talent is discovered" while Braun focused "on solidifying Hybe's presence in the US music industry" and "cementing [the company's] competitiveness in the stateside market." Chief Strategy Officer (CSO) Jaesang Lee, who led the Ithaca acquisition, was made Chief Operations Officer (COO). Plans for the launch of a new global girl group in collaboration with Geffen were announced on November 4; auditions closed on November 28. Braun became the sole CEO in January 2023, subsequently leading the acquisition of the American entertainment company QC Media Holdings in February. In July 2025, Braun transitioned out of his role as CEO of Hybe America. Isaac Lee, Chairman of Hybe Latin America, took Braun's place.

On September 9, 2026, Hybe America was changed to Hybe Americas.

- Hybe x Geffen Records
  - Katseye
  - Saint Satine
- Hybe x Republic Records
  - Rhea Raj
- Big Machine Label Group
  - Nashville Harbor Records & Entertainment
  - Big Machine Records
    - Nashville Harbor Records & Entertainment
- QC Media Holdings
  - Quality Control Music
  - Solid Foundation Management
  - Quality Films
  - QC Sports

==== Hybe Japan ====
Following Hybe's second leadership restructuring in July 2021, its Japanese subsidiaries, Hybe Solutions Japan and Hybe T&D Japan, (Note: formerly TNDJ) were integrated to form a regional headquarters, Hybe Japan. The Japanese branch operates as an independent entity under CEO and former Hybe Solutions Japan CEO Hyunrock Han. It oversees music production, music publishing, music copyright management, artist management, and talent scouting and development, as well as facilitates the entry of other Hybe artists into the Japanese market. Hybe Labels Japan debuted its first boy group, &Team, in December 2022. A collaboration with Hiroomi Tosaka of J Soul Brothers, announced in 2021, resulted in the creation of the girl group Moonchild, which debuted in 2023; Hybe Labels Japan co-produces the group with LDH Japan. Moonchild's music is produced by ØMI, with production handled by ALYSA, a producer and composer from Hybe Labels Japan. LDH Japan handles the management of the group. In 2025, Hybe Labels Japan rebranded as YX Labels. In March 12, 2025, Naeco officially registered its closure and ceased operations. In January 2026, Hybe Japan launched a new label, Jconic. On November 18, 2026, Hybe announced that Hybe Japan had acquired 50.10% of entertainment company KeyHolder.

- YX Labels
  - &Team
- JCONIC Labels
  - Aoen
- KeyHolder
  - Nogizaka46 LLC (Note: Joint venture with Sony Music Entertainment Japan)
    - Nogizaka46
  - SKE Co., Ltd.
    - SKE48 (management only)
  - Zest
    - Novelbright

===== Former artists =====
- Naeco
  - Yurina Hirate

==== Hybe Latin America ====
In November 2023, Hybe announced the creation of its Latin music division, Hybe Latin America, with offices in Mexico City, Los Angeles, and Miami. J.H. Kah, former vice president of YG Entertainment, was appointed as CEO, after the company confirmed the acquisition of Exile Content. In March 2024, Fernando Grediaga, previously an executive at EMI-Universal Music México, became general manager of Hybe Latin America. The leadership team also includes Isaac Lee as chairman and Juan S. Arenas as COO.

In June 2024, Exile Music was rebranded as Zarpazo and relocated to Miami, while its podcast service was renamed Ajá Podcasts. The establishment of new label Docemil Music was also announced.

Hybe Latin America will operate the Docemil and Zarpazo brands, with the aim of combining Hybe's K-pop development model with local strategies to target markets in Mexico and the U.S. Hispanic community. The division manages artists including Morat and Daddy Yankee and operates a touring agency for acts such as Quevedo and Cypress Hill.

Its projects include Santos Bravos, a reality show to form the Latin boy band Santos Bravos, and Pase a la Fama, a competition in partnership with Telemundo to select members of a Regional Mexican band. Additionally, the division launched the Hybe Experience, an interactive exhibition in Mexico City.

- Docemil Records
  - Adrian Cota
  - Meme del Real
- S1ento Records
  - Santos Bravos
- Zarpazo
  - Destino
  - Low Clika
  - Musza

==== Hybe China ====
Hybe China was established on April 2, 2025.

==== Hybe India ====
On September 23, 2025, Hybe established Hybe India Entertainment, based in Mumbai. The company aims to develop local talent through auditions and training programs, connecting artists born in India to global audiences. Hybe described Mumbai as "a cultural and entertainment hub that encompasses the Bollywood film industry, contemporary art, and diverse performing arts", unveiling the slogan "Where Indian voices become global stories." Through its activities in India, the subsidiary is also expected to contribute to the growing I-pop scene, a developing segment of the Indian music industry.

=== Platform ===
This is the technology division. It manages the social networking and entertainment platform Weverse, which serves as a hub for connecting and expanding all of Hybe's contents and services. In May 2021, Weverse Company invested in US startup Fave, an F2F platform for fandoms, as part of its plans to strengthen business opportunities in that territory.

- Weverse Company (Note: formerly beNX Co., Ltd.)
  - Weverse

=== Technology ===
The "tech-driven future growth" division is made up of specialized business units for video content, IP, learning, and games. Secondary and tertiary businesses are created based on the creative output of each label. In May 2021, Hybe Edu signed a business agreement with the International Korean Language Education Foundation (IKLEF) to develop Korean-language textbooks for distribution to overseas elementary and secondary schools through the Ministry of Education beginning in 2022. Various other online and offline content will also be created using BTS IP in response to an increasing demand for Korean-language education in foreign countries. In July 2021, it was announced that Hybe Solutions divisions Hybe 360 and Hybe IP had been merged into Hybe. On June 22, 2022, Cake Corporation announced that Hybe Edu had been bought by them on June 1, but would continue to carry out the activities of the latter. On July 1, 2025, Hybe IM was renamed to Drimage.

- Drimage (formerly Superb and Hybe IM)
- Hybe NEB
- Supertone (to-be dissolved)

== Controversies ==
=== Leaked audit documents ===
On October 24, 2024, Hybe came under public scrutiny during a National Assembly audit, when Representative Min Hyung-bae of the Democratic Party questioned Hybe's Chief Operating Officer, Taeho Kim, about the company's internal practices. During the session, Min disclosed the existence of an internal company document titled Weekly Music Industry Report—a collection reportedly totaling approximately 18,000 pages. The report allegedly contained derogatory remarks, unverified rumors, and harsh commentary about various K-pop idols. Portions of the document were later leaked online, prompting widespread criticism.

In response, on October 29, Hybe CEO Jason Jaesang Lee issued a public apology. He described the report as a compilation of external opinions and reactions related to K-pop trends, intended for internal analysis by a limited number of executives. Lee acknowledged that the content was "highly inappropriate and unacceptable" and expressed regret over the harm caused. He stated that Hybe was in the process of directly contacting affected agencies to offer apologies, and he also personally apologized to the company's artists who had been criticized in the leaked material.

=== Data security incidents ===
In January 2026, Weverse Company, a subsidiary of Hybe, came under scrutiny after reports that an employee had accessed and discussed users' personal information relating to fan-signing event lotteries. According to The Korea Herald, leaked internal messages showed the employee discussing applicants' identities, album purchase histories and the selection of winners. Hybe said it had removed the employee from their duties and referred the matter to its disciplinary committee. The company also said it would review possible legal action and strengthen its internal controls.

In September, Weverse confirmed a separate data leak affecting 422,584 user accounts. The exposed information included internal user identification numbers and transaction details, including payment methods, purchase amounts and refund information. The company said that users' names, contact details and payment card numbers were not affected. It was reported that Korea Internet & Security Agency notified Weverse of a potential security vulnerability on 3 September. Weverse subsequently reported the incident to the agency and said it had made changes to its API access controls and notified affected users.

On October 18, Hybe published an apology and notice acknowledging a personal information breach involving its internal systems, although the incident was not widely reported by the press until November 2, when it was belatedly brought to public attention by South Korean media. The company stated that unauthorised external access had occurred through a third-party document-preview solution connected to its electronic approval system, with further unauthorised access identified in its expense-processing system. The breaches occurred between September 12 and 13 and October 3 and 5, exposing personal information belonging to current and former employees and partner company personnel, including resident registration numbers, alien registration numbers, passport numbers, bank account and credit card details, contact information, addresses and medical records. Hybe stated that it had blocked the access routes, reported the incident to the Korea Internet & Security Agency and Personal Information Protection Commission, and begun notifying affected individuals individually. The company added that no suspected cases of misuse had been reported at the time and apologised, pledging to strengthen its internal security measures.

=== NewJeans contracts ===
On November 5, 2026, The New York Times published an investigation into the 2022 contracts between the members and ADOR. The report found that the agreements omitted several government-recommended safeguards for the underage members, including provisions concerning education, rest, and working conditions. It also reported that ADOR retained extensive rights to use the members' names, images, and voices, including in AI-generated content, even after the expiration of their contracts. Hybe said the agreements complied with South Korean law and were drawn up in good faith after discussions between ADOR and members. The company disputed conclusions from the investigation, stating that it followed child-protection requirements and had not pressured the members to give up their education or undergo cosmetic procedures. It also questioned the significance of concerns over contractual penalties, maintaining that a different calculation method would have made little difference.

The next day, ADOR issued a statement disputing the investigation, asserting that the contracts had been negotiated and finalized jointly by Min Hee-jin, the vice president she had appointed, the members and their parents, and the legal representatives of some members. The label maintained that the agreements contained provisions protecting the members' rights and that the controversial clauses neither disadvantaged them nor differed in their practical effect from the government-standard contract. Later that day, Min's representatives rejected claims that she had been responsible for the contracts, explaining that "ADOR had no independent legal team, and Hybe's legal team led the drafting and revision of the contracts". They noted that the agreements also required approval from Hybe's legal department, chief financial officer and chief executive officer, as well as its board of directors. In their view, this undermined the argument that individual labels had independent decision-making authority. They also maintained that the clauses concerning the use of the members' images and voices had been drafted and determined by Hybe's legal team.

== Legal matters ==
=== Dispute with Min Hee-jin ===
On April 22, 2024, Hybe requested for Min Hee-jin, the then-CEO of their sub-label ADOR, to step down from her position following an audit of the label amidst accusations of Min attempting to make Ador independent. Min released a statement dismissing those claims and also accused Hybe of overlooking the similarities between NewJeans and Illit, a girl group that debuted in March 2024 under Hybe's sub-label Belift Lab. In her statement, she accused Hybe and Belift of refusing to acknowledge the claims of Illit plagiarizing NewJeans' image from music to style, with the former's debut causing confusion amongst fans online. The value of Hybe's shares fell by 8.03% following the news. In response, Hybe submitted evidence to judicial authorities to refute the claims of plagiarism. A later court case dismissed the plagiarism claims.

Hybe officially reported Min Hee-jin to the police for "breach of trust" on April 25 following evidence retrieved from the audit that she is attempting to gain management of the label. Hybe later released text messages between Min and ADOR's vice president listing a series of methods to take control of the label. Hybe has also stated that they plan to meet with the legal representatives of NewJeans' members to discuss providing them with psychological and emotional care to support them for a successful return in the future. It was also announced that NewJeans, who are set to release a new single in May, will carry out activities as planned.

On April 25, seven hours after the report was filed, Min held an emergency press conference to deny the accusations against her. During the conference, she shared text messages exchanged between her, Bang Si-hyuk, and Hybe's former CEO Jiwon Park, some of which included Bang mentioning groups outside of Hybe. She accused Hybe of fabricating her words and revealed that she had filed an internal report in the past because the company failed to address her concerns over their treatment of NewJeans and her as a producer, however, this was ignored by the management. Issues regarding Hybe's leadership also came to light as Min accused Bang of trying to control all of Hybe's labels and removing their uniqueness. Min also stated that she's willing to talk to either Bang or Park but they never agreed.

Hybe requested for Ador to organize a board meeting on April 30. If the board members refuse to attend, then a request would be filed in court to open a shareholders' meeting for the label. The company also refuted all of Min's claims, additionally stating that she should respond to the audit and promptly step down from her position. Following a court case held on May 30, Min's injunction to stop Hybe from exercising their voting rights to dismiss her was accepted by the court. Meanwhile, the ruling noted that Min had sought to weaken Hybe's control over ADOR by attempting to remove NewJeans from Hybe's influence or by pressuring Hybe to sell its stake in ADOR, thereby enabling herself to take independent control of the label In respect of the court's decision, Hybe did not exercise its voting rights. If Hybe were to violate this and fire her, they would have to pay a compensation of ₩20 billion (US$14.92 million).

In July 2024, Min filed police complaints against five Hybe executives on charges of defamation and business obstruction. The police ultimately dismissed the case.

On November 20, 2024, Min resigned from all her positions (including the board internal director) at both ADOR and Hybe.

On January 9, 2025, Chairman Park Jung-kyu of the tech company Davolink alleged in an interview that Min had made efforts to "poach" NewJeans. He also mentioned that there had been previous discussions between him and Min regarding potential investment and the possibility of NewJeans leaving Ador to sign exclusive contracts with another company.

In early 2025, Min Hee-jin continued to face scrutiny over allegations of workplace misconduct and breach of trust. In January, the Ministry of Employment and Labor dismissed initial complaints of workplace harassment against her. However, in March, the Seoul Regional Employment and Labor Office issued an administrative fine against Min, determining that certain actions met the threshold for workplace harassment under South Korean labor law. Min appealed the decision.

In June, new developments emerged during ongoing court proceedings between Hybe and Min. Evidence presented in court included claims that Min had a hand in crafting emails that were publicly released by the families of NewJeans (then known as NJZ), raising questions about her role in shaping public narratives.

A major legal decision occurred on July 15, when the Seoul Yongsan Police Station cleared Min of all breach of trust allegations that had been filed by Hybe in April 2024. Authorities concluded there was insufficient evidence to pursue criminal charges. Following the decision, Hybe announced its intent to appeal, stating that it had uncovered new evidence and legal grounds to challenge the police's conclusion.

On February 12, 2026, it was reported that the court ruled in favor of Min in both her lawsuit seeking payment for shares under a put option agreement and Hybe's lawsuit seeking confirmation that the shareholder agreement was terminated. After the validity of Min's put option right is finalized, Hybe will have to pay Min ₩25.5 billion (US$19.03 million). In response to the ruling, the company stated they would appeal.

On October 16, it was confirmed that the shareholder agreement appeal would commence on December 17, and on November 4, it was confirmed that the put option appeal would commence December 9.

On November 16, Min was referred to the Seoul Western District Prosecutors' Office by Mapo Police Station on suspicion of occupational breach of trust, following an investigation into NewJeans' November 2024 announcement that they intended to terminate their exclusive contracts with ADOR. Police suspected that Min had influenced the group's decision to end their contracts. Two other former ADOR executives, identified by their surnames Lee and Shin, were also investigated but were cleared of suspicion and not referred for prosecution due to a lack of sufficient evidence. Her representatives denied that she had encouraged NewJeans to terminate their contracts and criticised the police for allegedly informing the media about the referral before formally notifying her. They questioned whether details of the investigation had been leaked and called for the matter to be examined. They also stressed that the referral was unrelated to the earlier investigation into Hybe's allegation that Min had attempted to take control of ADOR, which ended without her being referred for prosecution because of insufficient evidence.

=== Employee insider trading ===
In June 2024, South Korean prosecutors charged three employees of subsidiaries affiliated with Hybe with insider trading. The individuals were accused of selling company shares shortly before the public announcement on June 14, 2022, that members of the K-pop group BTS would be taking a hiatus. Prosecutors stated that the employees had access to non-public information about the announcement, which enabled them to sell their shares in advance and avoid financial losses estimated between US$24,000 and US$108,000, which the three denied during their first hearing at trial.

On July 22, 2025, the three individuals—who were no longer employed at Hybe at the time of sentencing—received suspended prison sentences ranging from six months to two years. In addition to the suspended terms, the court imposed financial penalties ranging from approximately ₩51 million (US$38,051.86) to ₩231 million (US$172,352.56).

Separately, on May 29, prosecutors from the Seoul Southern District Prosecutors Office raided the headquarters of Hybe as part of an investigation into allegations of fraudulent trading. A former Hybe executive was accused of earning approximately ₩240 million (US$179,067.6) in profits through insider trading by purchasing shares in YG Plus after obtaining non-public information about Hybe's planned investment in the company. Hybe stated that it was fully cooperating with authorities and reiterated its commitment to legal compliance and transparency.

=== Tax investigation ===
On July 29, 2025, the National Tax Service (NTS) of South Korea conducted a search and seizure operation at Hybe's headquarters in Yongsan, Seoul. This action was part of a broader investigation by the NTS's 4th Investigation Bureau into alleged tax evasion and irregular financial activities involving 27 companies. Hybe was among the businesses suspected of engaging in unfair stock practices and underreporting tax liabilities.

The probe specifically focused on Hybe's 2020 initial public offering (IPO) and transactions that preceded it. Authorities are investigating claims that Hybe and its executives, including founder and chairman Bang Si-hyuk, misled investors in 2019 by publicly stating that there were no plans for a stock market listing, while secretly preparing for an IPO. The company later proceeded with the listing, and Bang is alleged to have gained hundreds of billions of won in profits through a special purpose vehicle (SPV) that acquired shares on his behalf. Prosecutors believe Bang may have received as much as 30% of the proceeds from this SPV-linked transaction.

This marked the first tax raid on Hybe since June 2022, when a routine audit by the Seoul Regional Tax Office led to the imposition of a "a multi-billion-won penalty." The 2025 raid, however, signaled a significant escalation, as it followed two previous legal actions within the same month: one involving insider trading by Hybe executives and another centered on IPO-related fraud allegations relating to the founder, Bang Si-hyuk. Combined, these investigations reflect mounting legal and regulatory pressure on the entertainment conglomerate.

On April 21, 2026, South Korean police sought an arrest warrant for Hybe founder and chairperson Bang Si-hyuk over alleged violations of capital market laws related to Hybe's initial public offering, accusing him of misleading early investors and receiving profits through a related private equity fund.

== Filmography ==
=== Documentary ===
- Pop Star Academy: Katseye (2024) (with Interscope Films (PolyGram Entertainment) and Boardwalk Pictures)

=== Drama ===
- Begins Youth (2024) (with Chorokbaem Media)

=== Exhibitions ===
- "Hybe Insight" (2021–2023) in South Korea

=== Reality and variety ===
- I-Land (2020, Mnet) (with CJ ENM and Studio Take One)
- &Audition – The Howling (2022, Hulu Japan & Hybe Labels YouTube Channel)
- R U Next? (2023, JTBC) (with Belift Lab, Studio JAMM, Mushroom Company and YK Media Plus)
- World Scout: The Final Piece (2025)

=== Productions ===
- K-Pop: The Debut (2027) musical coming of age film produced with Epic Magazine for Paramount Pictures

== Weverse concerts and festivals ==
Date	Name	Venue	Ref.
December 31, 2020	2021 New Year's Eve Live presented by Weverse	Weverse (online)	
December 31, 2021	2022 Weverse Con [New Era]	KINTEX Hall (in-person); Weverse (online through VenewLive)	
June 10 to 11, 2023	2023 Weverse Con Festival	KSPO Dome and 88 Lawn Field (in-person)	
June 15 to 16, 2024	2024 Weverse Con Festival	Inspire Entertainment Resort (in-person)	
May 31 to June 1, 2025	2025 Weverse Con Festival	Inspire Entertainment Resort (in-person)	
June 6 to 7, 2026	2026 Weverse Con Festival	KSPO Dome (in-person)	
March 27 to 28, 2027	2027 Weverse Con Festival	TBA	

== Philanthropy ==
On February 13, 2023, Hybe donated ₩500 million through Save the Children to support the recovery of victims from 2023 Turkey–Syria earthquake.

On April 2, 2025, Hybe donated ₩1 billion (US$746,114.98) through the National trust for Cultural Heritage to help repair and restore national heritage damaged by wildfires in the Ulsan, Gyeongbuk, and Gyeongnam regions.

== Logos ==
Logo until 2026
