= Fromis 9 discography =

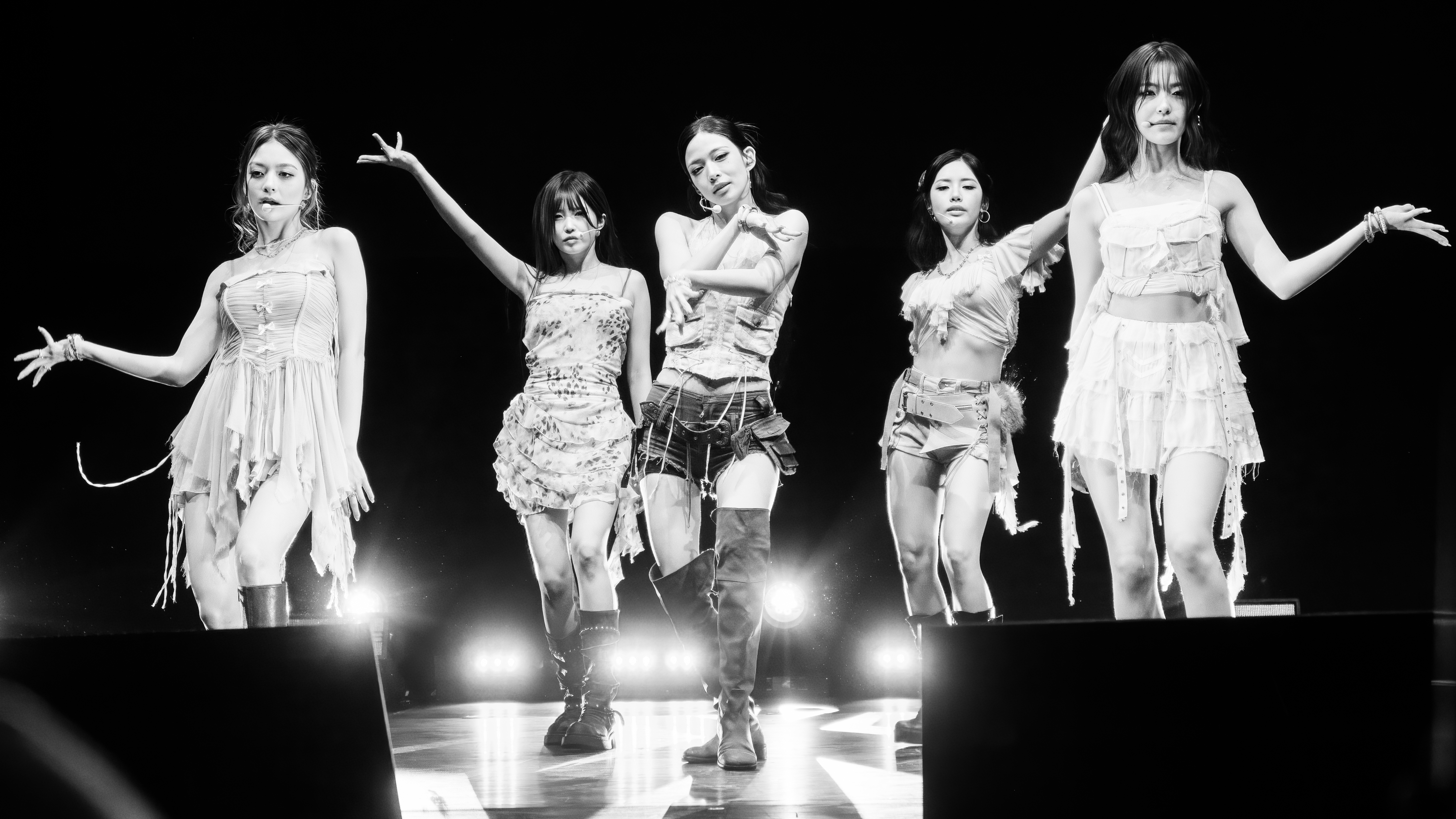
- Fromis 9 in 2025
- Studio albums: 2
- EPs: 7
- Singles: 17
- Music videos: 15
- Single albums: 5

South Korean girl group Fromis 9 have released two studio albums, seven extended plays, and five single albums. As support for larger recordings and as standalones, they have released seventeen singles.

The group's first release after being formed on Idol School was in 2017 with "Glass Shoes", described as a pre-debut release. Their official debut came the next year with To. Heart and its lead single "To Heart", released under Stone Music Entertainment.

Their first and only studio album, Unlock My World, was released in June 2023. It was released alongside the lead single "#menow". The following year, they released Supersonic, a three-track single album, alongside a lead single of the same name, which earned them their highest position to date on South Korea's Circle Digital Chart, peaking at 2.

At the end of 2024, Fromis 9 departed from Pledis Entertainment, releasing a special single "From". The next year, they signed with Asnd and released a new EP in June titled From Our 20's alongside its lead single "Like You Better".

== Studio albums ==
List of studio albums, showing selected details, selected chart positions, and sales figures
Title	Details	Peak chart positions			Sales
Title	Details	KOR	JPN	JPN Hot	Sales
Unlock My World	Released: June 5, 2023; Label: Pledis Entertainment; Formats: CD, digital download, streaming	5	8	7	KOR: 194,535; JPN: 10,787
Glow Me	Released: July 21, 2026; Label: Asnd; Formats: CD, digital download, streaming; Track listing: 1. "Eternal"; 2. "Vitamin Me"; 3. "Pocket Treat"; 4. "Blue Heart"; 5. "Screen Time"; 6. "Teacher"; 7. "Cold Blood"; 8. "Why Do I Cry?"; 9. "Day 1"; 10. "Wonderland"	2	—	—	KOR: 115,009
"—" denotes releases that did not chart or were not released in that region.

== Extended plays ==
List of extended plays, showing selected details, selected chart positions, and sales figures
Title	Details	Peak chart positions		Sales
Title	Details	KOR	JPN	Sales
To. Heart	Released: January 24, 2018; Label: Stone Music Entertainment; Formats: CD, digital download, streaming	4	—	KOR: 22,279; JPN: 1,146
To. Day	Released: June 5, 2018; Label: Stone Music Entertainment; Formats: CD, digital download, streaming	4	—	KOR: 20,480; JPN: 958
My Little Society	Released: September 16, 2020; Label: Off The Record Entertainment; Formats: CD, digital download, streaming, Kihno Kit	3	10	KOR: 55,251
Midnight Guest	Released: January 17, 2022; Label: Pledis Entertainment; Formats: CD, digital download, streaming, Kihno Kit	2	3	KOR: 149,702; JPN: 12,170
From Our Memento Box	Released: June 27, 2022; Label: Pledis Entertainment; Formats: CD, Kihno Kit, digital download, streaming	1	6	KOR: 194,231; JPN: 9,279
From Our 20's	Released: June 25, 2025; Label: Asnd; Formats: CD, digital download, streaming	5	47	KOR: 97,615
Like You Better (Japanese Version)	Released: April 1, 2026; Label: Asnd; Formats: CD, digital download, streaming; Track listing: 1. "Like You Better" (Japanese version); 2. "Love=Disaster" (Japanese version); 3. "Sky Runner"; 4. "Like You Better" (Inst.); 5. "Love=Disaster" (Inst.); 6. "Sky Runner" (Inst.)	—	4	JPN: 19,511
"—" denotes releases that did not chart or were not released in that region.

== Single albums ==
List of single albums, showing selected details, selected chart positions, and sales figures
Title	Details	Peak chart positions		Sales
Title	Details	KOR	JPN	Sales
From.9	Released: October 10, 2018; Label: Off The Record Entertainment; Formats: CD, digital download, streaming, Kihno Kit	3	—	KOR: 36,748
Fun Factory	Released: June 4, 2019; Label: Off The Record Entertainment; Formats: CD, digital download, streaming, Kihno Kit	2	—	KOR: 61,257
9 Way Ticket	Released: May 17, 2021; Label: Off The Record Entertainment; Formats: CD, digital download, streaming	4	9	KOR: 58,135; JPN: 5,935
Talk & Talk	Released: September 1, 2021; Label: Pledis Entertainment; Formats: CD, digital download, streaming	9	—	KOR: 23,000
Supersonic	Released: August 12, 2024; Label: Pledis Entertainment; Formats: CD, digital download, streaming	1	16	KOR: 142,651; JPN: 3,689 (phy.)
"—" denotes releases that did not chart or were not released in that region.

== Singles ==
=== As lead artist ===
List of singles, showing year released, selected chart positions, and name of the album
Title	Year	Peak chart positions			Album
Title	Year	KOR Circle	KOR Hot	US World	Album
"Glass Shoes" (유리구두)	2017	—	—	—	Non-album single
"To Heart"	2018	—	—	—	To. Heart
"DKDK" (두근두근)	2018	—	—	—	To. Day
"Love Bomb" (Note: "Love Bomb (Japanese ver.)" was scheduled to release on March 13, 2020, as Fromis 9's Japanese pre-debut single, but delayed permanently due to the COVID-19 pandemic.)	2018	— (Note: "Love Bomb" did not enter the Gaon Digital chart top 200, but peaked at number 81 on Download component chart.)	—	22	From.9
"Fun!"	2019	— (Note: "Fun!" did not enter the Gaon Digital chart top 200, but peaked at number 73 on Download component chart.)	94	—	Fun Factory
"Feel Good (Secret Code)"	2020	— (Note: "Feel Good (Secret Code)" did not enter the Gaon Digital chart top 200, but peaked at number 27 and 83 on the component Download and BGM charts, respectively.)	82	—	My Little Society
"We Go"	2021	106	51	14	9 Way Ticket
"Talk & Talk"	2021	97	—	—	Non-album single
"DM"	2022	57	66	—	Midnight Guest
"Stay This Way"	2022	14	—N/a (Note: The charts ran by Billboard Korea were defunct for these releases)	—	From Our Memento Box
"Sea of Moonlight" (달빛바다)	2022	— (Note: "Sea of Moonlight" did not enter the Gaon Digital chart top 200, but peaked at number 42 on Download component chart.)	—N/a	—	Non-album single
"#menow"	2023	13	—N/a	—	Unlock My World
"Supersonic"	2024	2	—N/a	—	Supersonic
"From"	2024	198	—N/a	—	Non-album single
"Like You Better"	2025	3	—N/a	—	From Our 20's
"White Memories" (하얀 그리움)	2025	2	9	—	Non-album single
"Vitamin Me"	2026	7	—N/a	—	Glow Me
"—" denotes releases that did not chart or were not released in that region.

=== Other charted songs ===
List of other charted songs, showing year released, selected chart positions, and name of the album
Title	Year	Peak chart positions	Album
Title	Year	KOR DL	Album
"Eye Contact" (눈맞춤)	2023	43	Unlock My World
"Wishlist"	2023	45	Unlock My World
"Don't Care"	2023	46	Unlock My World
"In the Mirror"	2023	48	Unlock My World
"Prom Night"	2023	49	Unlock My World
"What I Want"	2023	50	Unlock My World
"Bring It On"	2023	51	Unlock My World
"My Night Routine"	2023	52	Unlock My World
"Attitude"	2023	44	Unlock My World
"Beat the Heat"	2024	4	Supersonic
"Take a Chance"	2024	5	Supersonic
"Rebelutional"	2025	19	From Our 20's
"Strawberry Mimosa"	2025	22	From Our 20's
"Love=Disaster"	2025	23	From Our 20's
"Merry Go Round"	2025	24	From Our 20's
"Twisted Love"	2025	25	From Our 20's
"Eternal"	2026	7	Glow Me
"Pocket Treat"	2026	10	Glow Me
"Blue Heart"	2026	14	Glow Me
"Screen Time"	2026	13	Glow Me
"Teacher"	2026	18	Glow Me
"Cold Blood"	2026	17	Glow Me
"Why Do I Cry?"	2026	11	Glow Me
"Day 1"	2026	12	Glow Me
"Wonderland"	2026	15	Glow Me

=== Soundtrack appearances ===
List of soundtrack appearances, showing year released, selected chart positions, and name of the album
Title	Year	Peak chart positions	Album
Title	Year	KOR DL	Album
"Star" (별) (Note: Credited as Fromis 9 but only features Song Ha-young, Park Ji-won, and Lee Seo-yeon.)	2021	—	Cyworld BGM 2021
"Stay Alive"	2022	116	Crazy Love OST Part 2
"Love Me Back"	2023	59	Operation: True Love OST
"Swipe It Out"	2026	—	Boyfriend On Demand OST
"—" denotes releases that did not chart or were not released in that region.

== Videography ==
List of music videos, showing year released, name of the album and name of the director(s)
Title	Year	Album	Director(s)	Ref.
"Glass Shoes" (유리구두)	2017	Non-album single	Visualsfrom.	
"To Heart"	2018	To. Heart	Digipedi	
"DKDK" (두근두근)	2018	To. Day	Digipedi	
"Love Bomb"	2018	From.9	Digipedi	
"Fun!"	2019	Fun Factory	Digipedi	
"Feel Good (Secret Code)"	2020	My Little Society	Wooje Kim (Etui)	
"We Go"	2021	9 Way Ticket	Ziyong Kim (FantazyLab)	
"Talk & Talk"	2021	Non-album single	Ziyong Kim (FantazyLab)	
"DM"	2022	Midnight Guest	Lee Inhoon (Segaji)	
"Stay This Way"	2022	From Our Memento Box	Beomjin PKA Paranoid Paradigm (VM Project Architecture)	
"#menow"	2023	Unlock My World	Guzza (Kudo)	
"Supersonic"	2024	Supersonic	Jooyeong Yun (Earthluk) (AediaStudio)	
"Like You Better"	2025	From Our 20's	Minho Hong, Soomin Park (Achilles)	
"White Memories" (하얀 그리움)	2025	Non-album single	Hong Minho (Achilles)	
"Vitamin Me"	2026	Glow Me	Hong Minho (Achilles)	

=== Other videos ===
Title	Year	Ref.
"Sky Runner"	2026	
