= From.9 =

- Digital cover

Single album by Fromis 9
- Released: October 10, 2018
- Genre: K-pop; dance-pop
- Length: 10:23 (digital); 17:02 (physical)
- Language: Korean
- Label: Off the Record; Stone Music (digital/physical); Genie Music (digital)

Fromis 9 chronology
To. Day (2018)	From.9 (2018)	Fun Factory (2019)

Singles from From.9
- 1. "Love Bomb" Released: October 10, 2018

From.9 is the first special single album of the South Korean girl group, Fromis 9. The single album was released on October 10, 2018, by Off the Record Entertainment and distributed by Stone Music and Genie Music. The album's lead single is "Love Bomb".

From.9 marks the first comeback of the group with Jang Gyu-ri after her absence due to participating in Produce 48. This single album also marks their first release under Off the Record after officially signed with them last September.

== Background and release ==
On October 2, 2018, the group released teaser images for their comeback. The next day, through their official YouTube channel, they dropped a behind-the-scenes video of their preparations for their comeback as a 9-member group with Jang Gyu-ri's participation.

On October 4, 2018, it was announced via their SNS accounts that the single album would have 5 songs, with 3 new songs and 2 re-released songs from their last mini-album, To. Day, with "Love Bomb" as the lead single.

== Promotion ==
The group, through their SNS accounts, put up an invitation for a performance on October 5 at Gangnam station Exit 11.

== Track listing ==
Track listing for From.9
No.	Title	Lyrics	Music	Arrangement	Length
1.	"Love Bomb"	Jo Yoon-kyung	Mayu Wakisaka; Sean Alexander; David Amber	David Amber; Avenue 52	3:19
2.	"Dancing Queen" (Sung by Lee Sae-rom, Jang Gyu-ri, Roh Ji-sun, Lee Chae-young & Baek Ji-heon)	EJO	EJO; 1Hz; Kyum Lyk	1Hz; Kyum Lyk	3:25
3.	"Coloring (물들어 / muldeul-eo)" (Sung by Song Ha-young, Park Ji-won, Lee Seo-yeon & Lee Na-gyung)	Lee Seo-yeon; Jeong Yun-hwa	Jamie Song	Jamie Song	3:36
Total length:					10:20

CD only bonus tracks
No.	Title	Lyrics	Music	Arrangement	Length
4.	"DKDK (From.9 ver.)" (두근두근 / Dugeundugeun)	Bumzu; Baekho; Song Ha-young; Park Ji-won; Lee Seo-yeon	Bumzu; Park Ki-tae (PrismFilter)	Bumzu; Anchor (PrismFilter); Park Ki-tae (PrismFilter)	3:03
5.	"22nd Century Girl (From.9 ver.)" (22세기 소녀 / 22Segi Sonyeo)	Darly	Wonderkid; BreadBeat; Shinkung	Wonderkid; BreadBeat; Shinkung	3:35
Total length:					16:58

== Charts ==
Chart (2018)	Peak position
South Korean Albums (Gaon)	3

== Release history ==
Country	Date	Distributing label	Format
South Korea	October 10, 2018	Stone Music Entertainment, Genie Music	CD, digital download, streaming
Various	October 10, 2018	Stone Music Entertainment, Genie Music	CD, digital download, streaming
