= To. Day =

- Digital and "D-Day" version cover

EP by Fromis 9
- Released: June 5, 2018
- Length: 18:36
- Language: Korean
- Label: Stone Music

Fromis 9 chronology
To. Heart (2018)	To. Day (2018)	From.9 (2018)

Singles from To. Day
- 1. "DKDK (두근두근)" Released: June 5, 2018

To. Day is the second EP of South Korean girl group Fromis 9. The EP was released on June 5, 2018 by Stone Music. The physical version of the EP is available in two versions: "D-1" and "D-Day". Both of them consist of the same six songs, including the lead single, "DKDK (두근두근)". Member Jang Gyu-ri was not involved in the EP due to her participation in Produce 48.

== Track listing ==
Track listing for To. Day
No.	Title	Lyrics	Music	Arrangement	Length
1.	"Close To You" (다가가고 싶어; Dagagago Sipeo)	Lee Sae-rom; Song Ha-young; Park Ji-won; Roh Ji-sun; Lee Seo-yeon; Lee Chae-young; Lee Na-gyung; Baek Ji-heon	Tak	Tak	2:05
2.	"Think of You" (너를 따라, 너에게; Neoleul Ttala, Neoege)	Tak; Arran; 1Take	Tak; Arran; 1Take	Tak	3:33
3.	"Pitapat (DKDK)" (두근두근; Dugeundugeun)	Bumzu; Baekho; Song Ha-young; Park Ji-won; Lee Seo-yeon	Bumzu; Park Ki-tae (PrismFilter)	Bumzu; Anchor (PrismFilter); Park Ki-tae (PrismFilter)	3:03
4.	"22Century Girl" (22세기 소녀; 22Segi Sonyeo)	Darly	Wonderkid; BreadBeat; Shinkung	Wonderkid; BreadBeat; Shinkung	3:35
5.	"Clover"	Iggy; Youngbae	Iggy; Youngbae	Iggy; Youngbae	3:21
6.	"First Love"	Iggy; Youngbae	Iggy; Youngbae	Iggy; Youngbae	2:59
Total length:					18:36

== Charts ==
Chart (2018)	Peak position
South Korean Albums (Gaon)	4

== Release history ==
Country	Date	Distributing label	Format
South Korea	June 5, 2018	Stone Music Entertainment, CJ E&M Music	CD, digital download
Various	June 5, 2018	Stone Music Entertainment, CJ E&M Music	CD, digital download
