= ToHeart =

ToHeart may refer to:

- To Heart, Japanese visual novel and anime
- ToHeart (band), Korean band
- To. Heart, EP by South Korean girl group Fromis 9
