= Midnight Guest =

- Digital and "After Midnight" version cover

EP by Fromis 9
- Released: January 17, 2022
- Genre: K-pop
- Length: 16:25
- Language: Korean
- Labels: Pledis; YG Plus

Fromis 9 chronology
Talk & Talk (2021)	Midnight Guest (2022)	From Our Memento Box (2022)

Singles from Midnight Guest
- 1. "DM" Released: January 17, 2022

Midnight Guest is the fourth extended play by South Korean girl group Fromis 9. It consists of five tracks, including the lead single "DM". The extended play was released by Pledis Entertainment on January 17, 2022.

== Background and release ==
On December 15, 2021, Pledis Entertainment announced that Fromis 9 would be releasing a new extended play in January 2022. On December 30, it was announced the extended play would be release on January 17, 2022, and titled Midnight Guest, in the same announcement, a concept trailer was also released. On December 31, the promotional schedule was released. On January 6, 2022, nine concept film for each members was released. On January 10, the track listing was released with "DM" announced as the lead single. On January 11, the highlight medley video was released. On January 15 and 16, the teaser music video for "DM" was released. The extended play alongside the music video for "DM" was released on January 17.

== Composition ==
"DM" was described as a pop song with "faint chord progression and funky bassline" with lyrics about "the excitement of the moment when Fromis 9, who succeeded in escaping at dawn, approaches the person [they] likes and boldly confesses [their] love". "Escape Room" was described as a R&B dance song characterized by "addictive piano lines, dreamy guitar sound, synth bass, and sensuous chord progression". "Love is Around" was described as a pop ballad song and sung by members Lee Sae-rom, Song Ha-young, Jang Gyu-ri, and Lee Chae-young. "Hush Hush" was described as a house genre song and sung by members Park Ji-won, Roh Ji-sun, Lee Seo-yeon, Lee Na-gyung, and Baek Ji-heon. Park Ji-won and Lee Seo-yeon also participated in writing and composition of "Hush Hush". "0g" was described as a song with "warn syntax sound" and characterized by "various instruments".

== Promotion ==
Prior to the extended play's release, on January 17, 2022, Fromis 9 held a in-person live event, which was also broadcast live online, to introduce the extended play and communicate with their fans.

== Commercial performance ==
On January 13, YG Plus announced Midnight Guest had more than 120,000 pre-order sales. Midnight Guest debuted at position 2 on South Korea's Gaon Album Chart in the chart issue dated January 16–22, 2022.

== Track listing ==
Track listing for Midnight Guest
No.	Title	Lyrics	Music	Arrangement	Length
1.	"Escape Room"	Seo Jeong-ah	Xelor; Bymore	Bymore	3:26
2.	"DM"	Cho Su-jin; Ku Tae-woo	Lee Woo-min "Collapsedone"; Justin Reinstein; Louise Frick Sveen; Caroline Gustavsson	Collapsedone; Justin Reinstein	3:24
3.	"Love is Around" (sung by Lee Sae-rom, Song Ha-young, Jang Gyu-ri, & Lee Chae-young)	Moon Seol-ri	Lee Joo-hyung (MonoTree); Sophia Pae	Lee Joo-hyung (MonoTree)	3:16
4.	"Hush Hush" (sung by Park Ji-won, Roh Ji-sun, Lee Seo-yeon, Lee Na-gyung, & Baek Ji-heon)	Cho Su-jin; Park Ji-won; Lee Seo-yeon	Nmore (PrismFilter); Park Ji-won; Lee Seo-yeon	Nmore (PrismFilter)	3:03
5.	"0g"	Lee Seu-ran	Park Ki-tae (PrismFilter); Shannon; Elum (PrismFilter); Lee Beom-hoon (PrismFilter)	Park Ki-tae (PrismFilter)	3:16
Total length:					16:25

== Charts ==
=== Weekly charts ===
Chart performance for Midnight Guest
Chart (2022)	Peak position
Japanese Albums (Oricon)	3
Japanese Hot Albums (Billboard Japan)	4
South Korean Albums (Gaon)	2

=== Monthly charts ===
Monthly chart performance for Midnight Guest
Chart (2022)	Peak position
Japanese Albums (Oricon)	20
South Korean Albums (Gaon)	5

== Release history ==
Release history for Midnight Guest
Region	Date	Format	Label
South Korea	January 17, 2022	CD	Pledis; YG Plus
Various	January 17, 2022	Digital download; streaming	Pledis; YG Plus
