= Fun Factory (single album) =

- Digital and "FUN" version cover

Single album by Fromis 9
- Released: June 4, 2019
- Recorded: 2019
- Genre: Experimental; Dance-pop; Bubblegum pop
- Length: 9:47
- Language: Korean
- Label: Off the Record; Stone Music (digital/physical); Genie Music (digital)

Fromis 9 chronology
From.9 (2018)	Fun Factory (2019)	My Little Society (2020)

Singles from Fun Factory
- 1. "Fun!" Released: June 4, 2019

Music video
- "Fun!" on YouTube

Fun Factory is the second single album by South Korean girl group Fromis 9. The album was released on June 4, 2019 by Off the Record and distributed by Stone Music. The physical version of the single album is available in two versions: "Fun" and "Factory". Both of them consist of the same three songs, including the lead single "Fun!".

== Background and release ==
On May 22, it was revealed that Fromis 9 would come back on June 4 with their first single album Fun Factory.

Concept images were released on May 23 and music video teasers featuring each of the members were released from May 24 to June 2.

The single contains three tracks, including the lead single "Fun!", "Love RumPumPum" and "Fly High". The members Song Ha-young and Park Ji-won wrote and composed the song "Fly High".

The music video teaser was released on May 31 and the full music video was released on June 4 together with the single release.

== Promotion ==
The group began promoting the single "Fun!" on June 6. They first performed the lead single on Mnet's M Countdown, followed by performances on KBS' Music Bank, MBC's Show! Music Core and SBS' Inkigayo.

After finishing the promotions for "Fun!", it was announced that the group would carry out an additional round of performances, this time promoting the B-side "Love RumPumPum". The first performance was on Music Bank on July 12.

== Track listing ==
Track listing for Fun Factory
No.	Title	Lyrics	Music	Arrangement	Length
1.	"Fun!"	Kim Ji-hyang; Cho Sim; Koo Bon-am; Hwang Yu-bin	Drew Ryan Scott; Sean Michael Alexander; Melodesign	Avenue 52; Melodesign	3:03
2.	"Love RumPumPum" (Sung by Lee Sae-rom, Jang Gyu-ri, Roh Ji-sun, Lee Seo-yeon, Lee Chae-young, Lee Na-gyung & Baek Ji-heon)	Bumzu; Woozi	Anchor (PrismFilter); Park Ki-tae (PrismFilter); Bumzu; Woozi	Anchor (PrismFilter); Park Ki-tae (PrismFilter); Bumzu; Woozi	3:05
3.	"Fly High" (Sung by Song Ha-young & Park Ji-won)	Song Ha-young; Park Ji-won	Nmore (PrismFilter); Song Ha-young; Park Ji-won	Nmore (PrismFilter)	3:39
Total length:					9:47

== Charts and Sales ==
Chart (2019)	Peak position
South Korean Albums (Gaon)	2

Region	Sales
South Korea	56,121

== Release history ==
Region	Date	Format	Distributor
Various	June 4, 2019	Digital download; streaming	Off the Record; Stone Music
South Korea	June 4, 2019	Digital download; streaming	Off the Record; Stone Music
South Korea	June 4, 2019	CD	Off the Record; Stone Music
