= Unlock My World =

- Digital and "#imagine" version cover

Studio album by Fromis 9
- Released: June 5, 2023
- Genre: K-pop
- Length: 32:01
- Language: Korean
- Labels: Pledis; YG Plus

Fromis 9 chronology
From Our Memento Box (2022)	Unlock My World (2023)	Supersonic (2024)

Singles from Unlock My World
- 1. "#menow" Released: June 5, 2023

Unlock My World is the first studio album by South Korean girl group Fromis 9. It was released by Pledis Entertainment on June 5, 2023, and contains ten tracks, including the lead single "#menow".

== Background and release ==
On May 15, 2023, Pledis Entertainment announced Fromis 9 would be releasing their first studio album titled Unlock My World on June 5. A day later, the promotional schedule was released.

On May 17, the track listing was released with "#menow" announced as the lead single. On May 29, the concept trailer was released. On May 31, the highlight medley teaser video was released. On June 4, the music video teaser for "#menow" was released. The album was released alongside the music video for "#menow" on June 5.

== Music ==
With ten tracks, the album features six group songs and four unit songs. “Unlock My World” is noted to feature songs from various genres such as dance pop, R&B, electropop and UK Garage.

The album’s intro, “Attitude”, is a “dark pop, dance genre” track. The title track “#menow” is described as “stylish” and “heavily blended with contemporary rhythms”. The third track, “Wishlist” is a “dreamy, R&B” duet, sung only by Lee Chaeyoung and Park Jiwon with writing contributions from the latter. The fourth track, “In The Mirror” is described as “having a chorus that catches the ear”, with writing contributions from member, Baek Jiheon, and is sung only by Lee Seoyeon and Lee Nagyung.

The fifth track, “Don’t Care” is a “rhythmic, dance pop” song with “rhythmic and intense bass”. The sixth track, “Prom Night” is described as a “dynamic mood, UK-garage” track. The seventh track, “Bring It On” is described as having “groovy R&B vibes”. The eighth track, “What I Want” is a “stylish, electronic pop track”. The ninth track, “My Night Routine” is a song with “comfortable, and warm R&B melody”, with contributions from members, Lee Seoyeon and Lee Nagyung. The album’s closer “Eye Contact” is an “energetic rock” track that features writing contributions from all of the members.

== Critical reception ==
Professional ratings
Review scores
Source	Rating
NME	4/5 stars

Gladys Yeo of NME gave the album 4 out of 5 stars, writing that despite some missteps, Unlock My World allows us to witness how far fromis_9's identity – now in full bloom – has come, and points to even greater things to come.

Year-end lists for Unlock My World
Critic/Publication	List	Rank	Ref.
Paste	The 20 Best K-pop Albums of 2023	19	

== Track listing ==
Track listing for Unlock My World
No.	Title	Lyrics	Music	Length
1.	"Attitude"	Seo Jung-ah	C'SA; Bymore (Note: Also credited with arrangement.)	3:10
2.	"#menow"	Cho Su-jin	Ryan S. Jhun; Svea Kågemark; Celine Svanbäck; Jeppe London Bilsby; Stally; Pateko	2:49
3.	"Wishlist" (Sung by Park Ji-won & Lee Chae-young)	Park Ji-won	Lee Beom-hun; Jang Han-na; Park Ji-won	2:56
4.	"In the Mirror" (Sung by Lee Seo-yeon, Lee Na-gyung)	Danke (Lalala Studio); Lee Seu-ran; Baek Ji-heon	Christian Fast; Johannes Willinder	3:31
5.	"Don't Care" (Sung by Park Ji-won, Roh Ji-sun, Lee Seo-yeon, Lee Na-gyung)	Lee Seu-ran	Scott Russell Stoddart; Paulina "Pau" Cerrilla; Avenue 52	3:22
6.	"Prom Night" (Sung by Lee Sae-rom, Song Ha-young, Lee Chae-young, Baek Ji-heon)	Jo Yoon-kyung; Baek Ji-heon	C'SA; Ish Hokhmah	3:26
7.	"Bring It On"	Noh Joo-hwan; Moa "Cazzi Opeia" Carlebecker	"Hitman" Bang; Slow Rabbit; Moa "Cazzi Opeia" Carlebecker	2:51
8.	"What I Want"	Danke (Lalala Studio)	Justin Reinstein; Anna Timgren	3:29
9.	"My Night Routine"	Lee Seu-ran	Park Ki-tae (PrismFilter); Elum (PrismFilter); Lee Seo-yeon; Lee Na-gyung	2:57
10.	"Eye Contact"" (눈맞춤)	Lee Sae-rom; Song Ha-young; Park Ji-won; Roh Ji-sun; Lee Seo-yeon; Lee Chae-young; Lee Na-gyung; Baek Ji-heon	Nmore (PrismFilter); Shannon Bae; Song Ha-young	3:30
Total length:				32:01

== Charts ==
=== Weekly charts ===
Weekly chart performance for Unlock My World
Chart (2023)	Peak position
Japanese Albums (Oricon)	8
Japanese Combined Albums (Oricon)	9
Japanese Hot Albums (Billboard Japan)	7
South Korean Albums (Circle)	5

=== Monthly charts ===
Monthly chart performance for Unlock My World
Chart (2023)	Position
Japanese Albums (Oricon)	22
South Korean Albums (Circle)	10

== Release history ==
Release history for Unlock My World
Region	Date	Format	Label
South Korea	June 5, 2023	CD	Pledis; YG Plus
Various	June 5, 2023	Digital download; streaming	Pledis; YG Plus
