= 9 Way Ticket =

- Digital cover

Single album by Fromis 9
- Released: May 17, 2021
- Genre: K-pop; EDM
- Length: 9:31
- Label: Off The Record; Stone Music (digital/physical); Genie (digital)

Fromis 9 chronology
My Little Society (2020)	9 Way Ticket (2021)	Talk & Talk (2021)

Singles from 9 Way Ticket
- 1. "We Go" Released: May 17, 2021

9 Way Ticket is the third single album by South Korean girl group Fromis 9. The album was released on May 17, 2021 by Off the Record and distributed by Stone Music. The physical version of the single album is available in two versions: "Ticket To Seoul" and "9 Travelers". Both of them consist of the same three songs, including the lead single "We Go".

== Background and release ==
On May 3, 2021, Off The Record released a teaser photo confirming that fromis_9 would make a comeback with their third single album titled 9 Way Ticket on May 17.

On May 4–6, they released the first set of the concept photos for 9 Way Ticket. On May 7, the "Ticket To Seoul" version of the concept film for 9 Way Ticket was released. On May 8–10, they released the second set of the concept photos for 9 Way Ticket. On May 11, the "9 Travelers" version of the concept film for 9 Way Ticket was released. On May 12–13, they released the tracklist and the highlight medley for 9 Way Ticket respectively, revealing "We Go" as the lead single. On May 14–15, they released the first and second music video teasers for "We Go" respectively.

On May 17, the single album and the music video for "We Go" was released simultaneously.

== Music ==
The first track, "Airplane Mode" is a "mid-tempo, EDM song characterized by the emotional chords". The song features writing contributions from member, Park Jiwon. The second track, and the title track, "We Go" is a pop song with "funky guitar, and bass". The third track, "Promise", is described as "having sentimental keys and synths", "minimal drums and clear basslines", and a "Lo-Fi feel".

== Track listing ==
Credits adapted from Melon.

Track listing for 9 Way Ticket
No.	Title	Lyrics	Music	Arrangement	Length
1.	"Airplane Mode"	Wkly; Lee Seu-ran; Park Ji-won	Park Ki-tae (PrismFilter); Elum (PrismFilter); Shannon	Park Ki-tae (PrismFilter)	3:03
2.	"We Go"	Gu Tae-woo; Wkly	Lee Woo-min "collapsedone"; Lee Hae-sol; Justin Reinstein; J. Jean	Lee Woo-min "collapsedone"; Lee Hae-sol	2:56
3.	"Promise"	Lee Seu-ran	Han Kyoung-su (Artmatic); Lee Jeong-woo; Kang Woo-jin; Choi Min-jun	Lee Jeong-woo; Kang Woo-jin; Choi Min-jun; Han Kyoung-su (Artmatic)	3:32
Total length:					9:31

== Charts ==
Chart performance for 9 Way Ticket
Chart (2021)	Peak position
Japanese Albums (Oricon)	9
South Korean Albums (Gaon)	4

== Release history ==
Release history and formats for 9 Way Ticket
Country	Date	Format	Label
South Korea	May 17, 2021	CD, Kihno, digital download, streaming	Off the Record, Stone Music, Genie
Various	May 17, 2021	CD, digital download, streaming	Off the Record, Stone Music, Genie
