= Like You Better =

Single by Fromis 9

from the EP From Our 20's
- Language: Korean
- Released: June 25, 2025
- Length: 3:05
- Label: Asnd
- Composers: Honey Noise (The Hub); Brian U (The Hub); Tomy
- Lyricists: Tomy; Hanihas (XYXX); Uyeon (InHouse)

Fromis 9 singles chronology
"From" (2024)	"Like You Better" (2025)	"White Memories" (2025)

Music video
- "Like You Better" on YouTube

Professional ratings
Review scores
Source	Rating
IZM	1/5 stars

"Like You Better" is a song recorded by South Korean girl group Fromis 9 for their sixth extended play From Our 20's. It was released as the EP's lead single by Asnd on June 25, 2025. This marked the group's first single as a five-member act.

== Background and release ==
After the expiration of Fromis 9's contract with Pledis Entertainment, five of the group would sign with Asnd less than a month after. Once Asnd secured the rights for the group name's rights, they announced that the group was recording new music.

The group revealed the tracklist on June 11, with "Like You Better" serving as the lead single of the album.

== Composition ==
"Like You Better" was written by Tomy, Haniha (XYXX) and Uyeon (InHouse), with Tomy serving as the producer of the track also. The song is a "summer song" that blends "bright synth sounds" and "energetic guitar riffs". It also has an "explosive chorus" that "showcases the group's signature sound." The lyric is described as "taking a nuanced look at love from different angles".

== Promotion ==
Following the release of Like You Better, the group performed on four music shows: Mnet's M Countdown on June 26, KBS's Music Bank on June 27, MBC's Show! Music Core on June 28 and SBS's Inkigayo on June 29. During their second week of promotions, Fromis 9 performed at Mnet's M Countdown on July 3 and KBS' Music Bank on July 4.

== Commercial performance ==
In South Korea, "Like You Better" debuted at number three on the Circle Digital Chart, making this the group's second highest position on the chart next to "Supersonic".

== Accolades ==
Music program awards for "Like You Better"
Program	Date	Ref.
Music Bank	July 4, 2025	

== Charts ==
=== Weekly charts ===
Weekly chart performance for "Like You Better"
Chart (2025)	Peak position
South Korea (Circle)	3

=== Monthly charts ===
Monthly chart performance for "Like You Better"
Chart (2025)	Peak position
South Korea (Circle)	22

=== Year-end charts ===
Year-end chart performance for "Like You Better"
Chart (2025)	Position
South Korea (Circle)	99

== Release history ==
Release History for "Like You Better"
Region	Date	Format	Label
Various	June 25, 2025	Digital download; streaming	Asnd
