= Menow (song) =

"#menow"

Single by Fromis 9

from the album Unlock My World
- Language: Korean
- Released: June 5, 2023
- Length: 2:49
- Label: Pledis; YG Plus
- Composers: Ryan S. Jhun; Svea Kågemark; Celine Svanbäck; Jeppe London Bilsby; Stally; Pateko
- Lyricist: Cho Su-jin

Fromis 9 singles chronology
"Stay This Way" (2022)	"#menow" (2023)	"Supersonic" (2024)

Music video
- #menow on YouTube

"#menow" is a song recorded by South Korean girl group Fromis 9 for their first studio album Unlock My World. It was released as the album's lead single by Pledis Entertainment on June 5, 2023.

== Background and release ==
On May 15, 2023, Pledis Entertainment announced Fromis 9 would be releasing their first studio album titled Unlock My World on June 5. On May 17, the track listing was released with "#menow" announced as the lead single. On May 31, the highlight medley teaser video was released. On June 4, the music video teaser was released. The song was released alongside the album and its music video on June 5.

== Composition ==
"#menow" was written by Cho Su-jin, composed and arranged by Ryan S. Jhun, Jeppe London Bilsby, Stally, and Pateko, with Svea Kågemark, and Celine Svanbäck participating in the composition. "#menow" was composed in the key of F-sharp minor, with a tempo of 118 beats per minute.

== Commercial performance ==
"#menow" debuted at number 13 on South Korean's Circle Digital Chart in the chart issue dated June 4 to 10.

== Promotion ==
Prior to the release of Unlock My World, on June 5, 2023, Fromis 9 held a live event on YouTube and Weverse to introduce the album and its song, including "#menow", and to communicate with their fans. The group subsequently performed on three music programs in the first week: Mnet's M Countdown on June 8, KBS's Music Bank on June 9, and SBS's Inkigayo on June 11. On the second week, they performed on two music programs: SBS M's The Show on June 13, MBC M's Show Champion on June 14, where they won first place on the former.

== Accolades ==
On South Korean music programs, "#menow" achieved a first place win on the June 13 episode of The Show.

== Charts ==
=== Weekly charts ===
Weekly chart performance for "#menow"
Chart (2023)	Peak position
South Korea (Circle)	13

=== Monthly charts ===
Monthly chart performance for "#menow"
Chart (2023)	Position
South Korea (Circle)	62

== Release history ==
Release history for "#menow"
Region	Date	Format	Label
Various	June 5, 2023	Digital download; streaming	Pledis; YG Plus

== See also ==
- List of The Show Chart winners (2023)
