= From Our 20's =

- Digital cover

EP by Fromis 9
- Released: June 25, 2025
- Length: 17:47
- Language: Korean
- Label: Asnd

Fromis 9 chronology
Supersonic (2024)	From Our 20's (2025)	Like You Better (Japanese Version) (2026)

Singles from From Our 20's
- 1. "Like You Better" Released: June 25, 2025

From Our 20's is the sixth extended play by South Korean girl group Fromis 9. The EP was released by Asnd on June 25, 2025, as Fromis 9's first under the label and since restructuring as a five-piece group. The EP's lead single, "Like You Better", was released simultaneously to streaming platforms.

== Background and release ==
It would be a lie to say that we didn't feel pressured, as we are showing a new beginning with our first album as five members.

— Park Ji-won, Ize

In November 2024, Fromis 9 announced that their exclusive contract with Pledis Entertainment would be expire at the year's end, after being with the company since 2021. Two months later, it was revealed that five members of the eight had signed with Asnd, another South Korean record label. Once Asnd had secured the rights for the group to continue using the name, the label shared that the group was preparing new music.

On June 9, Asnd announced the group would release their sixth EP, From Our 20's, on June 25. The six song track list was revealed on June 11. Teaser photos and videos were released in the lead up to EP's official release date of June 25, 2025.

== Music ==
"Like You Better" is a summer song, featuring a refreshing synth and a lively guitar riff, layered with an explosive yet pop-leaning melody in the chorus. "Rebelutional" has "bold, straightforward lyrics" and an "emotionally charged melody". "Love=Disaster" is a "high-teen, Punk Rock" track, characterized by "refreshing high notes" and "intense rock sounds." "Strawberry Mimosa" is described as portraying "the thrill and excitement of a budding romance", likening it to "the taste of a slowly sipped drink." The song includes lyrics and composition contributions by member Park Jiwon. "Twisted Love" is set against an emotional guitar riff, with the lyrics exploring the duality and complexity of love. The song features lyrics and composition contributions by member Song Hayoung. The closing track, "Merry Go Round" is described as having "rich, brass tones" that "evokes a nostalgic, comforting atmosphere." The lyrics express their desire to share every happy moment together with their fans.

== Track listing ==
From Our 20's track listing
No.	Title	Lyrics	Music	Arrangement	Length
1.	"Like You Better"	Tomy; Hanihas (XYXX); Uyeon (InHouse)	Honey Noise (The Hub); Brian U (The Hub); Tomy	Honey Noise; Brian U	3:06
2.	"Rebelutional"	Tomy; Chae Si-hyeon	Rajan Muse; Ayushy (The Hub); Awrii (The Hub)	Muse	3:07
3.	"Love=Disaster"	Tomy; Han Seong-eun (153/Joombas); Coldweld (153/Joombas)	Kwon Ae-jin; Nild (Note: Also credited with arrangement); Haring (MonoTree)	Nild; Haring	2:36
4.	"Strawberry Mimosa"	Park Ji-won; Awrii; Ayushy	Park; Awrii; Ayushy; Tomy; Puff	Puff	2:46
5.	"Twisted Love"	Song Ha-young; Frankie Day (The Hub)	Song; Frankie Day; Tomy; Ohu	Ohu	2:59
6.	"Merry Go Round"	Tomy; Yoon Hui-won; Uyeon	Honey Noise; Brown Panda; Frankie Day; Meron Ryan	Honey Noise; Brown Panda	3:13
Total length:					17:47

== Charts ==
=== Weekly charts ===
Weekly chart performance for From Our 20's
Chart (2025)	Peak position
Japanese Albums (Oricon)	47
Japanese Digital Albums (Oricon)	33
South Korean Albums (Circle)	5

=== Monthly charts ===
Monthly chart performance for From Our 20's
Chart (2025)	Position
South Korean Albums (Circle)	16

== Release history ==
Release history for From Our 20's
Region	Date	Format	Label
Various	June 25, 2025	Digital download; streaming	Asnd
South Korea	June 25, 2025	CD	Asnd
