= My Little Society =

- Digital and "My Society" version cover

EP by fromis 9
- Released: September 16, 2020
- Genre: Dance
- Length: 16:21
- Label: Off The Record; Stone Music (digital/physical); Genie (digital)

Fromis 9 chronology
Fun Factory (2019)	My Little Society (2020)	9 Way Ticket (2021)

Singles from My Little Society
- 1. "Feel Good (Secret Code)" Released: September 16, 2020

My Little Society is the third EP of South Korean girl group Fromis 9. The mini-album was released on September 16, 2020. The physical version of the EP is available in two versions: "My Account" and "My Society". Both consists of the same five tracks, including the lead single "Feel Good (Secret Code)". Off The Record Entertainment announced that Lee Seoyeon would not be able to participate in the promotions for My Little Society due to a leg injury on September 10, 2020.

== Background and release ==
On August 25, 2020, Off The Record Entertainment confirmed that fromis_9 will make a comeback on September 14, making it their first comeback after a year and three months since their last one. On September 2, Off The Record announced that fromis_9 would release their third EP with the name My Little Society on September 16, two days from the previously confirmed date.

On September 3–5, they released the first set of the concept photos for My Little Society. Then, on September 6–8, they released the second set of the concept photos. The next day, on September 9, they released some group concept photos. On September 11–12, they released the tracklist and the highlight medley for My Little Society respectively, revealing "Feel Good (Secret Code)" as the lead single. On September 15–16, they released the first and second music video teasers for "Feel Good (Secret Code)" respectively.

On September 16, they released My Little Society along with the music video for "Feel Good (Secret Code)".

== Promotion ==
They held their first live performance for "Feel Good (Secret Code)" on September 16, 2020, on Mnet's M Countdown. Then, they continue to perform "Feel Good (Secret Code)" on other music shows, including MBC's Show! Music Core, SBS's Inkigayo, and SBS MTV's The Show.

== Track listing ==
Credits adapted from Melon.

No.	Title	Lyrics	Music	Arrangement	Length
1.	"Feel Good (Secret Code)"	Cho Sim; Seo Ji-eum	Lee Woo-min "collapsedone"; Justin Reinstein; J. Jean	Lee Woo-min "collapsedone"; Justin Reinstein	3:45
2.	"Weather"	Kim In-hyoung; Kako	Nmore (PrismFilter); Choi Young-kyoung	Nmore (PrismFilter)	3:22
3.	"Starry Night" (별의 밤; Byeol-ui bam)	Lee Seo-yeon; BuildingOwner (PrismFilter); Choi Young-kyoung	Lee Seo-yeon; BuildingOwner (PrismFilter); Choi Young-kyoung	BuildingOwner (PrismFilter)	3:01
4.	"Somebody to love"	Lee Sae-rom; Crazy Music; KZ; Antik; Lee Yun-jin; Clef Crew	Crazy Music; KZ; Antik; Lee Yun-jin; Clef Crew	Crazy Music; Antik	3:13
5.	"Mulgogi" (물고기)	Lee Sae-rom; Park Ji-won; Lee Seu-ran; Shannon	Park Ki-tae (PrismFilter); Shannon	Park Ki-tae (PrismFilter)	2:52
Total length:					16:21

== Charts ==
=== Weekly ===
Chart (2020)	Peak position
South Korean Albums (Gaon)	3

=== Monthly ===
Chart (2020)	Peak position
South Korean Albums (Gaon)	11

== Release history ==
Country	Date	Format	Label
South Korea	September 16, 2020	CD, Kihno, digital download, streaming	Off The Record, Stone Music, Genie
Various	September 16, 2020	CD, digital download, streaming	Off The Record, Stone Music, Genie
