= Y:SY =

South Korean singer (born 2000)

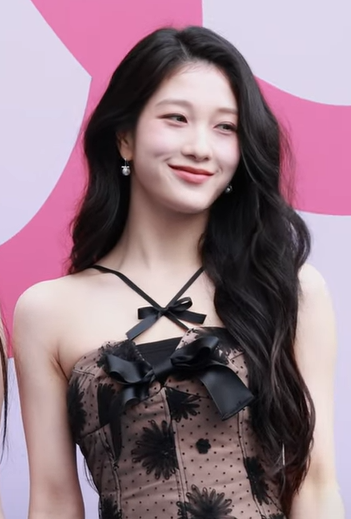
- Lee in 2024
- Born: Lee Seo-yeon; January 22, 2000 (age 26); Seoul, South Korea
- Occupation: Singer
- Musical career
- Genre: K-pop
- Instrument: Vocals
- Years active: 2017–present
- Labels: Stone Music; Off the Record; Pledis; H1ghr Music
- Formerly of: Fromis 9

Korean name
- Hangul: 이서연
- RR: I Seoyeon
- MR: I Sŏyŏn

Lee Seo-yeon (Korean: 이서연, born January 22, 2000), also known as Y:SY, is a South Korean singer. She is best known as a former member of the girl group Fromis 9. Lee departed from the group in February 2025 after her contract with Pledis Entertainment expired in 2024. In 2025, she signed with H1ghr Music to start her career as a solo musician.

== Early life and education ==
Lee was born in Seoul, South Korea, and raised in Incheon, South Korea. She attended the School of Performing Arts Seoul before dropping out. At the age of 10, she joined YG Entertainment as a trainee. In 2011, she appeared in the music video for "Knock Out" by GD & TOP, marking her first public appearance in the K-pop industry. She was one of the trainees under YG Entertainment's pre-debut project "Future 2NE1". On July 1, 2012, YG Entertainment released dance and individual vocal performance videos of her through its official YouTube channel, introducing her as part of the trainee lineup. She left the company before joining Idol School.

== Career ==
=== 2017–2018: Idol School and debut with Fromis 9 ===
In 2017, Lee participated in the Mnet survival show Idol School. She finished in seventh place, securing her debut as a member of the resulting girl group Fromis 9. The group officially debuted on January 24, 2018, with the release of To. Heart.

=== 2018–2025: Time with Fromis 9 ===
During her time in Fromis 9, Lee was recognized for her versatility in singing and dancing. She also contributed to the group's creative process, co-writing songs such as "My Night Routine," "Eye Contact," and "Starry Night".

In September 2020, she temporarily halted group activities due to a leg injury and did not participate in promotions for the EP My Little Society. On October 28, 2022, Pledis Entertainment announced that Lee would again suspend her activities for health reasons, and she returned to the group later that year.

On December 31, 2024, Fromis 9's exclusive contract with Pledis Entertainment expired. Five members of the group continued under a new label, though Lee Seo-yeon chose not to join, leaving the group in February 2025.

=== 2025–present: Solo career ===
In 2025, Lee released her first solo digital single, "I Guess It's Our Last Spring". She also contributed the track "I Am You, You Are Me" to the OST of the web drama Our Secret Diary. On June 25, 2025, Lee announced a collaboration with Ejel, titled "Loyal Girl". The song was released on June 30.

On July 23, it was announced that Lee had signed an exclusive contract to H1ghr Music to embark on her solo career. In November, her agency announced she would adopt a new stage name, "Y:SY", ahead of her solo debut "Naked" on November 17. On September 9, 2026, Lee released her first solo mini album, Goodies, with title track "Energy".

== Philanthropy ==
In 2025, Lee joined World Vision Korea,'s "Give A Nice Day" campaign to support children affected by war. To promote the campaign, Lee wore the "One Day Bracelet", designed with three colors to symbolize the different situations faced by children in conflict zones.

== Discography ==
=== As lead artist ===
Title	Year	Peak chart positions	Album
Title	Year	KOR Down.	Album
"I Guess It's Our Last Spring" 우린 마지막 봄인가 봐	2025	—	Non-album singles
"Loyal Girl" 의리소녀, with Ejel	2025	—	Non-album singles
"Naked"	2025	135	Non-album singles
"Energy"	2026	—	Goodies
"Language"	2026	—	Goodies

=== Music videos ===
Title	Year	Director	Ref.
"Naked"	2025	Wuzlike	
"Energy"	2026	Seokzoo Hong	

=== Soundtrack appearances ===
Title	Year	Album
"I Am You, You Are Me" 넌 나고 난 너야, Zico cover	2024	Our Secret Diary OST

=== Songwriting credits ===
Lee Seo-yeon has songwriting and composition credits on several Fromis 9 tracks:

- "My Night Routine"
- "Eye Contact"
- "Starry Night"
- "From"
- "Take a Chance"
- "Hush Hush"
- "Coloring"
- "DKDK"

== Filmography ==
=== Television shows ===
- Idol School (2017)
- King of Mask Singer (2024)
