= From (song) =

Single by Fromis 9
- Language: Korean
- Released: December 23, 2024
- Genre: K-Pop
- Length: 3:21
- Label: Pledis
- Composers: Song Ha-young; Jeon Jin; Heon Seo
- Lyricists: Baek Ji-heon; Lee Chae-young; Lee Na-gyung; Lee Sae-rom; Lee Seo-yeon; Park Ji-won; Roh Ji-sun; Song Ha-young
- Producers: Song Ha-young; Jin Jeon; Kim Seung-jun

Fromis 9 singles chronology
"Supersonic" (2024)	"From" (2024)	"Like You Better" (2025)

"From" is a song recorded by South Korean girl group Fromis 9. It was released as a special single dedicated to their fans on December 23, 2024, as their final song under Pledis Entertainment. The song was written by all members of Fromis 9.

== Background and release ==
On November 29, 2024, Pledis Entertainment announced that their exclusive contract with Fromis 9 would conclude on December 31 that year. The announcement revealed that the group would be releasing one final song under the label. On December 6, it was announced that the song "From" would be released on December 23.

== Composition ==
"From" was written by the eight members of Fromis 9, and was composed and produced by member Song Ha-young alongside Jin Jeon, Kim Seung-jin.

The song has been described as a "fan song", a tribute to the group's fans for their support. On writing the song, the members said it was a "letter from their hearts", intended to warm the cool winter and they hope to happily remember this and future times with their fans.

== Charts ==
Chart performance for "From"
Chart (2024)	Peak position
South Korea (Circle)	198

== Release history ==
Release history for "From"
Region	Date	Format	Label
Various	December 23, 2024	Digital download; streaming	Pledis; YG Plus
