= DM (song) =

Single by Fromis 9

from the EP Midnight Guest
- Language: Korean
- Released: January 17, 2022
- Genre: K-pop
- Length: 3:24
- Label: Pledis; YG Plus
- Composers: Lee Woo-min "collapsdone"; Justin Reinstein; Louise Frick Sveen; Caroline Gustavsson
- Lyricists: Cho Su-jin; Gu Tae-woo

Fromis 9 singles chronology
"Talk & Talk" (2021)	"DM" (2022)	"Stay This Way" (2022)

Music video
- "DM" on YouTube

"DM" (Note: An initialism for the phrase "doesn’t matter", as member Ji-heon said in the Midnight Guest media showcase) is a song recorded by South Korean girl group Fromis 9 for their fourth extended play Midnight Guest. It was released as the lead single on January 17, 2022, by Pledis Entertainment.

== Background and release ==
On December 15, 2021, Pledis Entertainment announced that Fromis 9 would be releasing a new extended play in January 2022. On December 30, it was announced the extended play, titled Midnight Guest, would be released on January 17, 2022. A concept trailer was also released in the same day. On January 10, the track listing was released with "DM" announced as the lead single. On January 11, the highlight medley video for Midnight Guest was released. On January 13, the sound source and portion of the choreography was released on TikTok. On January 15 and 16, the teaser music video was released. The song, alongside its music video, was released on January 17.

== Composition ==
"DM" was written by Cho Su-jin and Gu Tae-woo, composed by Lee Woo-min "collapsedone", Justin Reinstein, Louise Frick Sveen, and Caroline Gustavsson, and arranged by Lee and Reinstein. Musically, the song is described as a pop song with "faint chord progression and funky bassline" with lyrics about "the excitement of the moment when Fromis 9, who succeeded in escaping at dawn, approaches the person [they] likes and boldly confesses [their] love". "DM" was composed in the key of B minor, with a tempo of 122 beats per minute.

== Commercial performance ==
"DM" debuted at position 57 on South Korea's Gaon Digital Chart in the chart issue dated January 16–22, 2022.

== Promotion ==
Prior to the extended play's release, on January 17, 2022, Fromis 9 held a live event online and offline to introduce the extended play and communicate with their fans. Following the release of the extended play, the group performed "DM" on four music programs on the first week: MBC M's Show Champion on January 19, Mnet's M Countdown on January 20, KBS2's Music Bank on January 21, and SBS's Inkigayo on January 23. On the second week of the song's release, the group performed on SBS MTV's The Show on January 25, and MBC M's Show Champion on January 26, where they won first place in both appearances.

== Credits and personnel ==
Credits adapted from Melon.

- Cho Su-jin – lyrics
- Gu Tae-woo – lyrics
- Lee Woo-min "collapsedone" – composition, arrangement
- Justin Reinstein – composition, arrangement
- Louise Frick Sveen – composition
- Caroline Gustavsson – composition

== Accolades ==
On South Korean music programs, "DM" achieved first place wins on two broadcasts; the January 25 episode of The Show and the January 26 episode of Show Champion.

== Charts ==
=== Weekly charts ===
Weekly chart performance for "DM"
Chart (2022)	Peak position
South Korea (Gaon)	57
South Korea (K-pop Hot 100)	66

=== Year-end charts ===
Year-end chart performance for "DM"
Chart (2022)	Position
South Korea (Circle)	160

== Release history ==
Release history for "DM"
Region	Date	Format	Label
Various	January 17, 2022	Digital download; streaming	Pledis; YG Plus
