= Talk & Talk =

- Digital cover

Single by Fromis 9
- Language: Korean
- Released: September 1, 2021
- Genre: K-pop
- Length: 3:24
- Label: Pledis
- Composers: Andreas Carlsson; Denzil Remedios; Ryan S. Jhun; Anna Timgren; Stephen Stahl; Courtney Jenaé Stahl
- Lyricist: Danke (Lalala Studio)

Fromis 9 singles chronology
"We Go" (2021)	"Talk & Talk" (2021)	"DM" (2022)

Fromis 9 chronology
9 Way Ticket (2021)	Talk & Talk (2021)	Midnight Guest (2022)

Music video
- "Talk & Talk" on YouTube

"Talk & Talk" is a song recorded by South Korean girl group Fromis 9. It was released as a special single album on September 1, 2021, through Pledis Entertainment. The song was written by Danke (Lalala Studio), composed by Andreas Carlsson, Denzil Remedios, Ryan S. Jhun, Anna Timgren, Stephen Stahl, Courtney Jenaé Stahl and arranged by Remedios and Jhun.

== Background and release ==
On August 24, 2021, the official Fromis 9 social media accounts uploaded a teaser photo confirming that the group would be released new single on September 1 titled "Talk & Talk". It marked Fromis 9's first release after being transferred from Off the Record Entertainment to Pledis Entertainment on August 16. On August 24 and 25, concept photos of the girls were released. Teaser videos for "Talk & Talk" were released on August 29 and 30. On September 1, the single album and its accompanying music video were released.

== Composition ==
"Talk & Talk" is composed by Andreas Carlsson, Denzil Remedios, Ryan S. Jhun, Anna Timgren, Stephen Stahl and Courtney Jenaé Stahl, and written by Danke. "Talk & Talk" is a "dance-pop song with a balance of retro-feels and synths and an addictive chorus". In the lyrics, it compares the excitement of wanting to talk on the phone all night to a game where you say random things and Shiritori (a game where you complete the last player's sentence).

== Charts ==
Chart performance for "Talk & Talk"
Chart (2021)	Peak position
South Korea (Gaon)	97
South Korean Albums (Gaon)	9

== Accolades ==
Music program awards
Program	Date	Ref.
The Show	September 7, 2021	

== Release history ==
Release history and formats for Talk & Talk
Country	Date	Format	Label
South Korea	September 1, 2021	CD, digital download, streaming	Pledis
Various	September 1, 2021	CD, digital download, streaming	Pledis
