= To. Heart =

- Digital and "Blue" version cover

EP by Fromis 9
- Released: January 24, 2018
- Recorded: 2017–2018
- Genres: K-pop; dance-pop
- Length: 19:48
- Language: Korean
- Labels: Stone Music; CJ E&M Music

Fromis 9 chronology
To. Heart (2018)	To. Day (2018)

Singles from To. Heart
- 1. "To Heart" Released: January 24, 2018

To. Heart is the debut extended play of the South Korean girl group Fromis 9. The mini-album was released on January 24, 2018 by Stone Music. The physical version of the EP is available in two versions: "Green" and "Blue". Both of them consist of the same six tracks, including the lead single, "To Heart".

== Background ==
In January 2018, it was announced that Fromis 9 would debut with their first mini-album after the release of their pre-debut digital single, "Glass Shoes", released on November 30, 2017.

== Promotion ==
The group held a special showcase to present the single "To Heart" on January 24, 2018, which was a live broadcast on Naver's V Live app. They held their debut stage on January 25, 2018 on Mnet's M Countdown.

== Track listing ==
Track listing for To. Heart
No.	Title	Lyrics	Music	Arrangement	Length
1.	"The Way To Me" (나에게로 오는 길; Naegero Oneun Gil)	Lee Sae-rom; Song Ha-young; Jang Gyu-ri; Park Ji-won; Roh Ji-sun; Lee Seo-yeon; Lee Chae-young; Lee Na-gyung; Baek Ji-heon	Tak	Tak	2:11
2.	"To Heart"	Iggy; Youngbae	Iggy; Youngbae	Iggy; Youngbae	3:09
3.	"Miracle" (환상속의 그대; Hwansangsogui Geudae)	Darly	Wonderkid; BreadBeat; ATM	Wonderkid; BreadBeat; ATM	3:43
4.	"Pinocchio" (피노키오)	Darly	SlyBerry; Shinkung; Darly; Wonderkid	SlyBerry; Shinkung; Wonderkid	3:20
5.	"Be With You"	1Take; Tak	1Take; Tak	1Take; Tak	3:50
6.	"Glass Shoes (MAMA Ver.)" (유리구두; Yurigudu)	Bumzu	Anchor (PrismFilter); Sophiya; Kyulkyung; Yuha; Joe Michel	Anchor (PrismFilter)	3:35
Total length:					19:48

== Charts ==
=== Weekly ===
Chart (2018)	Peak position
South Korean Albums (Gaon)	4

=== Monthly ===
Chart (2018)	Peak position
South Korean Albums (Gaon)	24

== Release history ==
Country	Date	Distributing label	Format
South Korea	January 24, 2018	Stone Music Entertainment; CJ E&M Music	CD, digital download
Worldwide	January 24, 2018	Stone Music Entertainment; CJ E&M Music	CD, digital download
