= Idol School (2017 TV series) =

South Korean television series

- Hangul: 아이돌 학교
- Hanja: 아이돌 學校
- RR: Aidol hakgyo
- MR: Aidol hakkyo
- Directed by: An Joon-young
- Presented by: Kim Il-Jeong; Kim Hee-chul
- Theme music composer: Black Eyed Pilseung
- Country of origin: South Korea
- Original language: Korean
- No. of episodes: 11

Production
- Executive producer: Shin Yoo-sun
- Running time: 80 minutes (Episodes 1-4); 110 minutes (Episodes 5-11)
- Production company: Studio Take One (Note: A subsidiary of CJ E&M)

Original release
- Network: Mnet
- Release: July 13 – September 29, 2017

Related
- Produce 101

Idol School (Korean: 아이돌 학교) is a 2017 reality girl group survival show on Mnet. The program aimed to form a 9-member girl group from a pool of 41 female participants, training them in singing, dancing and other "subjects" over an 11-week time period.

While sharing similarities to another Mnet survival program, Produce 101, the two shows differed in many ways including its number of participants, voting system, and number of winners that will form the final group. Another of the shows greatest differences was how they treated the eliminated contestants. In Idol School, participants were given the chance to continue studying in the 'normal class' where they would continue studying in a different class off-campus (off location) under less public scrutiny, for a chance to debut in a future group.

The show premiered on July 13, 2017, with the final episode airing on September 29, 2017. The new group name was revealed to be Fromis 9, meaning "From Idol School", but pronounced similar to "Promise" in Korean, and the final line means the never-ending possibilities and the promising and prosperous road ahead after graduation that would last forever. The new group members trained and released albums through Pledis Entertainment, while their group activities were managed by Stone Music Entertainment/Off the Record Entertainment, as a joint venture with CJ E&M.

== Concept ==
Although promoted as a survival program, Idol School, as its name suggests, was structured similarly to an actual school wherein for a total of 11 weeks, the participants will receive lessons in not only singing and dancing, but also the history of K-pop and everything that comes with being an idol in South Korea, such as mental training and appearing in public. Producer Shin Yu-seon stated that they started recruiting participants in April 2017. Only female trainees aged 13 (Korean age) and above who were not trainees of any entertainment company were allowed to join. The producer also clarified that former trainees and even former singers were also given the chance to participate. This caused some controversy as some people felt that it went against its concept of 'training ordinary students'. But, despite this opinion, a number of female participants who had previously trained under entertainment companies made the cut. Viewers voted live every episode and the students' 'grades' were completely determined by the votes. The decision to form a 9-person group was also decided by pre-show voting, where the choice was between 5–13. The cost of phone voting was 100 won, and all the money collected was donated to CJ Donors Camp.

Super Junior member Kim Hee-chul acted as the show's 'homeroom teacher' while veteran actor Lee Soon-jae was the principal of the school. The participants were also taught by several teachers: Singer and S.E.S member Bada was a vocal and performance trainer along with S.M. Entertainment vocal trainer Jang Jin-young. Dance was taught by choreographer Park Jun-hee and singer Stephanie. Black Eyed Pilseung produced the music. Kim Il-jeong served as the MC for Debut Diagnostics Exams and School Entrance Ceremony.

== Episodes ==
=== Episode 1 ===
After the introduction of the show from the acting principal, Lee Soon-jae, the girls enter the classroom one by one, a video of the audition tape of the next student to enter playing on the screen in front of them. The girls began their lessons with a vocal evaluation, singing "Into the New World" by Girls' Generation as the trainers Bada and Jang Jin-young rank them vocally, in which Natty places first. Meanwhile, Lee Hae-in surprises people by doing poorly after losing her voice, and another contestant, Som Hye-in, struggles with the lyrics.

They then start dance lessons with Park Jun-hee and Stephanie, where students must learn re-choreographed versions of "Treasure" by Bruno Mars and "Deja Vu" by Beyonce with both songs' choruses looped on a cycle. Each group of 10 must keep dancing until they get picked off to rest, thus getting the pass from the instructors. Stephanie asks Bae Eun-yeong to step in to teach Yoo Ji-na during free practice. For the evaluation, Tasha ranks first while Jeong So-mi ranks last, scoring 1 point. Som Hye-in once again faces difficulties during the assessment and vomits in the bathroom.

Fitness instructor Yoon Tae-shik, who has trained celebrities, also performs a physical endurance test focusing on the lower body, especially the hips, gluteal muscles, and thighs with the students, in which the first test is a paired shadow-sitting competition. In the individual chair-sitting competition, Kim Eun-suh lasts the longest, thus getting the maximum 10 points. Yoo Ji-Na comes last out of the healthy participants, thus scoring only 0.4 points.

After completing the entrance tests, the top student with the highest grades is announced, and Natty is congratulated during the opening ceremony with the faculty and the class and is named class president. The students also begin their military-like dorm life, sleeping in one large room that would fit all 40 of the students, which would also be inspected regularly by a supervisor; if a student earns 15 demerit points, they will be expelled. While the other students are sleeping, Som Hye-in decides to leave the show due to poor health. At the end of the episode, they reveal the voting results ranking the 40 students and the top 9 students, with Lee Hae-in ranking first.

=== Episode 2 ===
Students go through a morning run where they must also sing the school anthem in order to boost their lung capacity, cardiovascular fitness, and correct vocalization technique. After the morning run and breakfast, they have a class about the memorable "killing part" and have practice recordings. Lee Hae-In, who lost her voice the day before, had still not fully recovered from a cold, but does well in the practice. After a buffet-style lunch, they get a new dance break, where Song Ha-young and Natty win the dance break parts in the MV, thus becoming dual-centers of the mass dance. They also record the MV for the school anthem where they have to be able to capture their memorable killing part. The students also watch a dance performance from Illusion, a 32-mixed-student dance crew from university, which was for recording the promo video, where there are many intricate formation changes based on the letters W, X, 111, V and two V's stacked on each other, and must get into each formation in 16 beats (4 bars).

Kim Na-yeon is the worst student in the mid-way point of the broadcast, so she pleads for votes at the end of the live update. In the formation practice, Lee Si-an struggles again, having already been singled-out as a poor dancer the day before. Then, 10 more are singled out due to lack of individual coordination, but they manage to improve on the third try. Yoo Ji-Na, on the other hand, is praised after noticing the problems with the details of the formation, despite being a poor individual dancer the previous day. Bae Eun Yeong is also praised for her continued support of the group despite being set in the corner and stuck in the back half of the group, showing great leadership. It also gives them a lesson to acknowledge each other's differences in expressing frustration and signs for asking help. Thus, peer-study pairs are formed, where an older, or stronger dancer will take care of the weaker one.

In the evening, they start their self-study of the dance, led by Song Ha-young and Natty. Tasha and Bin Ha-neul (Sky) are tasked to check the formation, and they pick the five students that struggled (Kim Ju-hyun, Snowbaby, Yoo Ji-na, Jo Se-rim, and Lee Si-an) to train all night.

The next morning, the two youngest members, Michelle White and Park Sun are called to meet the principal to see how they are coping. Special teacher Sol Bi is introduced for a class in Psychological Health Management. She also uses art therapy to let student express themselves, because Sol Bi used art as an outlet as well.

In the evaluation before the actual MV recording, it appears the plan failed, and the four are told to never use this method again. In the MV taping the day after, they only have 3 chances to perform as a whole 40-student squad, or else, the 10 worst students would not be in the MV. Although Lee Si-an and Park Ji-won kept splitting off on the right side (on screen) of the W, they manage to perform as a whole group in the final take. As Song Ha-young came first in the votes, she becomes the class president for the week.

=== Episodes 3 and 4 ===
Students start the first Debut Diagnostics Exam in a live dance and vocal performance in CJ E&M Building where they will split into teams of 8, and each will cover a girl group song. The leaders are predetermined by the teachers based on performances thus far and contents of their diary, but the team members are picked by the preferences of the remaining students. The best endurance on bar hang will determine the song picking order, and killing part of each song are determined by the filming test (open to 15 students).

They also had a class where they must wear makeup that fit the songs they are performing, and must submit a practice video. The bottom 8 students at the end of episode 4 will be expelled. The other part of the Exam involves making a different types of variety shows. This was to test their vocal stability while dancing, and completeness of the dance. The winning group gains an Individual Ranking +1 card that is automatically in play in the final voting results, and also gains the opportunity to call their family.

Due to the +1 cards, Lee Sae-rom moves up to 9th, Natty is bumped down to 10th, meaning Natty would not have debuted if the team were to be picked. Lee Yeong-yoo is saved by the +1 card, knocking Snowbaby into the bottom 8 and eliminating her instead. Before the eliminated students are escorted out of the classroom, the principal gives a testimony to them and gives them his well wishes. However, they will be moved to normal class in Careers Club to study and be trained and housed separately from the remaining students, but with the same teachers, and it is optional. The 8 eliminated students all accept the transfer offer.

=== Special On-line Live Broadcasts ===
Due to the uncertain status of the 8 eliminated students after they decline the offer to transfer to the "Normal Class" which they initially accepted, the 5th episode is shifted back a week and replaced by highlights of the students thus far, including some behind-the-scenes footage. Live voting was suspended and instead, the remaining students held 14 live broadcasts within the campus on the show's official Facebook page. Originally set for 80 minutes, but due to technical difficulties, the broadcasts were delayed and the time restrictions were lifted. The remaining students did not start broadcasting until midnight, KST. The second Diagnostics Exam was rescheduled to be held and recorded on August 13.

=== Episode 5 ===
The episode starts with all 40 students having breakfast before the first class, where Bada starts the class in their dorm room and informs them that the group will be split into classes based on their advanced level on dancing and singing, their own and peer evaluation of ranking, then 3 classes on performance in general because many students have to try performing songs that don't suit them. Each class will become a group for the second Debut Diagnostic Exam, with Advanced Class, Intermediate Classes and Beginner's Classes matching up against each other. The MVP Group can get a free midnight supper pass. In Performance Classes, taught by Stephanie, they learn to be able to find the operating camera and focus their eyes and body towards it, and jostle to ward the foreground in order to gain more screen time. In order to do this more accurately, the test was done with the ceiling lights off. As former trainees of JYP Entertainment, YG Entertainment and S.M. Entertainment respectively, Park Ji Won, Lee Seo Yeon and Seo He Rin excelled in the exercise. It was later revealed next episode that they also had an emotion management game where they must act out a scenario while dancing to a song. Dance Classes were taught by Park Jun-hee, where they focused on correct microphone usage and transfer to other members while moving and dancing. Vocal classes was taught by Jang jin-young, where they focused on cardiovascular fitness by singing on treadmill. Only Advanced Vocal class was revealed as Intermediate and Beginner's Class were filled by eliminated students. Heechul also brought the students to a dog shelter to do volunteer work in order to develop their empathy but was also considered a break for the students. Four groups were given tasks like walking, bathing and taking care of injured dogs while the rest cleaned the shelters. Jo Young Ju accepted the Certificate of Appreciation on behalf of the students. They later recorded videos to pledge for dog adoption which were posted on Auction, a shopping website similar to eBay. Heechul also conducted the practice progress test to assess them from the audience's point-of-view, so he can also predict voters' tendencies.

The Advanced Performance Class A and B were the first to compete in the Midterm Exam, where all members of the team with the highest average score between live audience and teachers would gain one 'Ranking +3' card, plus the student that has shown the most improvement from the Basic Strength Exam to this Exam will gain two 'Ranking +3' cards that are automatically applied at the end of episode 6, which gives them a chance to go up 3 spots (6 for Most Improved Student) from their original ranking. The first team performed "Mr.Mr." by Girls' Generation and the second performed "Adrenaline" by the Girls' Generation subunit TaeTiSeo. The second team won with an average of 84. The third team performed Hush by Miss A, but the scores are not revealed.

In the end, the top 9 at the end of episode 4 were seated, but at the end of live voting and last week's internet voting, Yoo Ji-na loses the top 9 spot to Roh Ji-sun and swapped seats. Also after episode 6, only 28 students will remain.

=== Episode 6 ===
The students are gathered in the courtyard outside the clock tower, where the top 9's ranking progression charts are shown. It is also announced that 4 students will be eliminated. Advanced Dance Class chose BO$$ by Fifth Harmony with Park Jun-hee's recommendation. The Advanced Vocal Class initially picked You and Me by IU, but was rejected by the teachers because it didn't suit them. They then pick Just In Love by S.E.S. because they want to get to the top half of the rankings and avoid last places and eliminations while also facing a team with all members in the top half of the rankings. For the Vocal team's judging criteria, it would be vocal stability and harmony, the Advanced Dance team must create the majority of their own choreography themselves, and Kim Eun-suh became the first student to be in charge of the killing part twice in a row as she also did the killing part for Cheer Up in the last Exam. During the Advanced Vocal Group's Practice, Jang Jin-young fixed Kim Na-yeon's vocals and realizes the song suits her very well, and her voice can be very similar to Bada, which was why she got the killing parts. These were also the high notes that Bada covered in the original song, but Na-yeon is actually the type that write many notes to aid her memory. After the performance, Heechul goes over from the students' waiting room for Bada's reaction, and states the song was not sung live often, and they did very well. The Advanced Vocal Group won the match-up in an upset, giving Jang Jin-young and Bada their only victory since the Intermediate and Beginner's Vocal classes were already abolished due to the previous eliminations.

The Beginner's Performance Class is formed with 4 of the funniest mood makers outside of classes. They match up against the Beginner's Dance Class, which also must create parts of their own choreography. They picked Fin.K.L's Forever Love. They win by vocal abilities and camera sense. Jenny is featured in the Catallena group because of her famous father, yet she lacked in many skills when she first started, especially vocally. Lee Si-an is praised in the progress checks for her stable vocals while dancing. However, they performed the worst out of the members and only average 68 points, and the individual scores are not shown.

The Intermediate Performance B team features many young students, and they decide to pick Pretty U by Seventeen, the only group to pick a male group against the A group, which performed Hush by Miss A. But the Pretty U group's biggest challenge is the fact that the 5 members (including Kim Eun-kyul, who was from the defunct Vocal Class) have to cover for 13 members, and they also have poor lower body strength, especially Kim Eun-kyul because she is the youngest student of the School and is the thinnest. The Performance Team can also put in an Act. While they lost to Hush team, who got the highest average score, they were praised by the teachers for improved camera sense. Park Soo-myeong improved by 33.3 points between the Basic Strength Tests to midterm, so she gained an extra +3 card as she was in the winning team as well. She is praised for her overall improvement in dancing, fitness, live performance and camera sense. After the Exam, Heechul starts impromptu teacher-parent meetings as the students pack up.

The next day, the losing teams go shopping in Seoul's Reebok store with Stephanie for new apparel, and prepare for phone calls and live streams with members of public the following day. The day after that, they write letters to Heechul for career advice, and he uses his experience in the industry to help them. Notably, Park Ji-won wanted to work on her comedic sense, given the school has no proper classes for such type of idols.

In the end, all ranking bonuses are in play, and Park So-myeong jumps to tie 6th after her two +3 cards, while Song Ha-young falls to 9th as 6 of the top 9 from last episode got +3 cards. Yoo Ji-na returns to the top 9 at tie 6th, even with no bonus cards, meaning Lee Chae-young and Lee Hae-in are out of top 9. The eliminated students can still choose to stay with the school and continue studying in the normal class. Lee Da-hee manages to stave off elimination with her +3 card (29th to 26th). With the eliminations of Kim Eun-kyul and Park Sun, 3 of the youngest students from episode 1 are eliminated. Lee Young-yoo, who staved off elimination last time due to her +1 card, was eliminated. Jo Yoo-bin was also eliminated to round out the second set of eliminated students.

=== Episode 7 ===
After the 4 eliminated students say their parting words, they all leave the school campus. As a Special Star Quality Exam (related but separate from the Debut Diagnostics Exam), the remaining students host a series of extracurricular live broadcasts of August 25 on KakaoTV, with the topics to be determined by online members. The winners are determined by viewership numbers, with the members in the programs get Rankings +1 Cards. The test is to see whether the members have individual charms and personalities to attract new fans, becoming variety show stars. Lee Sae-rom and Song Ha-young's Yoga Class wins, and both get Ranking +1 cards that help them get to the top 2 spots.

The day after the special exam, Stephanie shares her experiences of living with 13 other trainees at one point, and how her ankles were badly damaged due to overuse by dancing on high heels for long periods of time, taking 5 years to heal, which included her major back injuries in 2010. She also announces the Idol Week leading to the final Debut Diagnostics Exam, where 10 students will be eliminated, and the final 18 will have the Lineup Exam to determine the final 9, with a set of Rankings +3 cards for the winning member of each also up for grabs, and is an intra-team individual competition. +3 cards will be later awarded to the winning group members for the highest overall scores.

In the end, Park So Myeong falls out of the top 9, Baek Ji-heon falls out of the top 9 for the first time as she falls to 10th place, and Lee Hae-in and Lee Chae-young return to the top 9. Lee Da-hee rounds out the Top 18, while Sky is ranked 19th, which has her in danger of elimination.

=== Episode 8 ===
The show is shifted to 11pm (KST) to fill the timeslot after the end of Show Me The Money. The week is called "Idol Week" because each group of students will be in internship with current or former girl group members, and they can pick the song to perform as part of their third and final Debut Diagnostics Exam. For the songs they picked to practice, some of the original singers will visit them as their mentors. The songlists are (mentors):

1. GFriend - Rough (Full group)
2. Twice - Like Ooh-Aah (Mina, Momo)
3. KARA - Step (Heo Youngji)
4. PRISTIN - Wee Woo (Nayoung, Roa, Yuha, Eunwoo, Rena, Kyulkyung, Xiyeon)
5. APINK - No No No (Kim Nam-joo)
6. S.E.S. - ('Cause) I'm Your Girl [Bada, Shoo (by video call)]

Initially, there was no maximum limit of members per song, but the students with the highest Exam score last time get the first pick, which was Park So-myung. However, as the 'draft' unfolds, Wee Woo, No No No, and Step got the most students as they are both easy to sing and are good for changing concepts, so the groups have over-saturated. On the other hand, Rough was the least popular due to its intricate and difficult choreography. After an hour of practice, they can choose to switch rooms, but with maximum number imposed based on current situation.

After the members for each group are set, the next day, they set off to see the original members and mostly the practice rooms of the respective agencies. Then it skipped ahead the hours before the exam.

The first group to perform was Wee Woo group, where they went to Pledis Entertainment's training room to get tips from Pristin, they corrected the true killing part of the song from the choreography point of view, then each member was assigned to Pristin's member for individual training, except for Park So-myeong, who had help from Yuha and Eunwoo as she was the worst dancer.

The group was praised for finding the overhead camera in the group killing part, Lee Na-gyung showed marked improvement and Lee Seo Yeon got the rankings +3 card as the top member of the group, thus successfully transforming to a cutesy concept, Lee Sae-rom, who also had many sexy/sassy concept, came third.

The second group to perform was Ooh-Ahh group. In the end, it was notable that Like Ooh-Aah group featured all former JYP trainees (Lee Chaeyoung, who returned after initially leaving to join Step group, but that group has all students in the danger zone, as the final 4 members are on the 19th-22nd bubble, Natty and Park Ji-won from Sixteen), and Song Ha-young was the sole member from the beginning, and volunteered as the leader as she is the oldest. Lee Chaeyoung, unlike Son Ha-young, was never known as a rapper, but managed to become the sub-rapper for Dahyun's part. It was particularly bittersweet from Natty and Jiwon as Momo and Mina taught them the hip swing dance in the song and asked about how Mina and Momo's lives changed after being on debut. In the end, Park Ji-won was third, Lee Chaeyoung beat Natty by 0.9 points to gain Rankings +3 card.

The final group to perform in the episode was Step group. Tasha opted to showcase her rapping ability while Sky opted to sing the killing part while still teaching Lee Si-an the second rapping part, she wanted to transform from "class clown" and "ability black hole" to "sexy beauty". Her transformation is particularly tough because she also needed to go on a diet. However, she was praised by Hur Youngji for her restrained emotions. The group, like the last group, also had to practice hip movement dance. The team was praised for the way each member compliments each other. The group has the highest individual scores thus far. Lee Si-an came first with a score of 85.6, the highest so far, completing her most successful transformation.

The full results and actual rankings were not revealed, but the top 9 students had changed again. Yoo Ji-na fell out of top 9, while Baek Ji-heon returns to top 9.

=== Episode 9 ===
In the end, only the top 9 students were revealed and ranked, the 3rd set of eliminated students will be revealed at the end of the next episode, setting up the final debut lineup for the top 18.

== Production ==
The school campus is an English Village in Yangpyeong County, Gyeonggi Province, South Korea. The Debut Diagnostics Exams occur inside CJ E&M Center Studio located in Sangam-dong, Mapo District, Seoul. On Episode 8, members went to various girl group idols' agencies in Seoul, including GFriend (Source Music), Twice (JYP Entertainment), Pristin (Pledis Entertainment), Kara (DSP Media, as Heo Youngji remains with the company as a solo artist) as their 'internship' and exclusive training for the final exam.

== Theme song ==
The song "Cause You're Pretty" (예쁘니까) which was sung by the 41 contestants, was released digitally by Mnet on July 13, the same day as the show's premiere. The contestants also performed the song on M! Countdown. It also serves as a school anthem and ending theme song.

== Ranking ==
The top 9 contestants are chosen through online voting combined with the live votes as the episode airs. At the end of episode 3, however, internet voting is suspended almost every even week, with exams to be held every odd week, so the votes are added from the internet voting of before episode 3 and live voting of episodes 3 & 4, plus ranking +X cards that are automatically in play. The results for episode 5 was based on live-voting results of episode 5 and internet voting last week. Results for episode 7 is based on Viewership voting on August 25, Internet voting before Episode 7 and live voting.

Next round of internet voting resumed after episode 9, but only the top 9 were revealed.

#	Episode 1	Episode 2	Episode 3	Episode 4	Episode 5	Episode 6	Episode 7	Episode 8	Episode 9	Episode 10
1	Lee Hae-in	Song Ha-young ↑6	Song Ha-young =	Baek Ji-heon ↑3	Song Ha-young ↑3	Roh Ji-sun ↑1	Song Ha-young ↑8	Song Ha-young =	Roh Ji-sun ↑2	Song Ha-young ↑1
2	Natty	Lee Hae-in ↓1	Lee Hae-in =	Lee Hae-in =	Roh Ji-sun ↑11	Baek Ji-heon ↑1	Lee Sae-rom ↑3	Lee Sae-rom =	Song Ha-young ↓1	Roh Ji-sun ↓1
3	Lee Chae-young	Lee Chae-young =	Lee Chae-young =	Lee Seo-yeon ↑4	Baek Ji-heon ↓2	Lee Na-kyung ↑1	Roh Ji-sun ↓2	Roh Ji-sun =	Lee Seo-yeon ↑3	Lee Sae-rom ↑1
4	Seo He-rin	Park Ji-won ↑1	Baek Ji-heon ↑2	Song Ha-young ↓3	Lee Na-kyung ↑4	Lee Seo-yeon ↑2	Park Ji-won ↑4	Lee Na-kyung ↑1	Lee Sae-rom ↓2	Lee Chae-young ↑1
5	Park Ji-won	Natty ↓3	Natty =	Lee Chae-young ↓2	Lee Hae-in ↓3	Lee Sae-rom ↑4	Lee Na-kyung ↓2	Park Ji-won ↓1	Lee Chae-young ↑3	Park Ji-won ↑5
6	Kim Eun-kyul	Baek Ji-heon ↑3	Park Ji-won ↓2	Park Ji-won =	Lee Seo-yeon ↓3	Yoo Ji-na ↑4	Lee Seo-yeon ↓2	Lee Seo-yeon =	Lee Hae-in ↑3	Lee Na-kyung ↑1
7	Song Ha-young	Jo Yu-ri ↑1	Lee Seo-yeon ↑4	Yoo Ji-na ↑5	Park Ji-won ↓1	Park So-myeong ↑5	Yoo Ji-na ↓1	Baek Ji-heon ↑3	Lee Na-kyung ↓2	Lee Seo-yeon ↓4
8	Jo Yu-ri	Lee Sae-rom ↑5	Yoo Ji-na ↑4	Lee Na-kyung ↑1	Lee Chae-young ↓3	Park Ji-won ↓1	Lee Chae-young ↑4	Lee Chae-young =	Baek Ji-heon ↑2	Baek Ji-heon =
9	Baek Ji-heon	Lee Na-kyung ↑5	Lee Sae-rom ↓1	Lee Sae-rom =	Lee Sae-rom =	Song Ha-young ↓8	Lee Hae-in ↑1	Lee Hae-in =	Jang Gyu-ri ↑4	Jang Gyu-ri =

=== Result ===
fromis 9 will be trained by Pledis Entertainment, headed by the CEO, Han Sung Soo as the producer and will be managing the group from the formation to the debut of the group. A reality program will document their journey during the transition period, and it will air every Friday from October 20, 2017.

#	Episode 11 (Total votes)	
#	Name	Votes
1	Roh Ji-sun	71,834
2	Song Ha-young	71,549
3	Lee Sae-rom	71,037
4	Lee Chae-young	65,318
5	Lee Na-kyung	64,001
6	Park Ji-won	63,816
7	Lee Seo-yeon	61,083
8	Baek Ji-heon	59,577
9	Jang Gyu-ri	57,230

== Aftermath ==
- The group formed on the show is called fromis 9. The new group members will be trained and release albums through Pledis Entertainment, but Stone Music Entertainment will manage their activities as a joint venture with CJ E&M.
- In 2018, Bae Eun-young (18th), Lee Si-an (16th), Jo Yu-ri (15th), and Jang Gyu-ri (9th), who had already debuted with fromis 9 participated in Produce 48 as trainees of Stone Music Entertainment. Jo ended up debuting in the group Iz*One after finishing in 3rd place.
- Park Sun (30th) joined Starship Entertainment as a trainee, and appeared on the MV of Love It, Live It by YDPP, a project boy group that participated in Produce 101 Season 2. In October 2021, King Kong by Starship posted a new profile of her, revealing that she would be pursuing an acting career moving forward.
- Kim Myung-ji (27th) made her acting debut in November 2018 where she made a cameo in the drama Mood Maker
- Jo Yu-bin (29th) signed with MyDoll Entertainment, and made her debut in 2018 as a dancer and lead vocalist of Pink Fantasy, as well as being in the group's subunit SHY.
- Jo Se-rim (40th) signed with Yuehua Entertainment Korea, and made her debut as a dancer and vocalist of Everglow in March 2019 under the stage name Onda.
- Lee Yoo-jeong (26th) signed with Brickworks Company, and made her debut in 2019 as a vocalist and guitarist for the group Ho1iday under the stage name Haru.
- Natty (13th) signed with Swing Entertainment, a subsidiary of Stone Music Entertainment, and made her solo debut in 2020 with the album Nineteen. On July 5, 2023, she re-debuted as a dancer and vocalist of Kiss of Life under S2 Entertainment, with Lee Hae-in (11th) as the creative director of the group.
- Snowbaby (Cai Rui Xue, 33rd) returned to Taiwan, and is now a Mandarin-language YouTuber, advertisement model and influencer.
- Jessica Lee (35th), is now a YouTuber. In her channel, she has talked about her experience in Idol School.
- In 2020, Iz*One filmed variety show Iz*One Chu 3 - Fantasy Campus in the same campus as Idol School. It was the first time Jo Yu-ri returned to campus with Iz*One.
- On July 31, 2022, Jang Gyu-ri departed from Fromis 9 after her original record with Off The Record Entertainment expired.

=== Vote manipulation investigation ===
Following allegations of electoral fraud in Produce X 101 that resulted in a lawsuit, the Seoul Metropolitan Police Agency also included Idol School in their investigation. On October 3, 2019, a trainee of Idol School alleged anonymously that only 3-4 trainees, out of 4,000 applicants, had auditioned to appear on the show. In an interview with MBC, a trainee alleged that, throughout their six-month training period, the contestants were only given clothes appropriate for the summer and had to wear them in cold weather. In addition to that, they were cut off from outside communication, were only allowed to buy daily necessities once a month, and were not given enough food to eat.

Lee Hae-in's father alleged through her fan site that CJ ENM suggested during her audition that she sign with their subsidiary agency to ensure that she would be able to debut after elimination, and she had done so out of fear of not being accepted into Idol School. However, after being eliminated, CJ ENM did not follow up and she was unable to sign contracts with other agencies before finally signing up with The Groove Company in 2020. In response, CJ ENM issued an apology.

It was also revealed that producer Kim Tae-eun had eliminated Lee Hae-in from the new girl group that was formed through the show, despite her being ranked first in viewer votes.

Along with Produce X 101's vote rigging controversy, MBC broadcast a feature on PD Note on October 15, 2019. Several trainees anonymously claimed that their living quarters had poor ventilation and some girls developed rashes from dust. The trainees also claimed that they were so malnourished some of them did not menstruate or had periods lasting for two months.

== Ratings ==
In the ratings below, the highest rating for the show will be in red.

Episode	Air date	tvN			Mnet	
Episode	Air date	AGB ratings		TNms ratings	AGB ratings	TNms ratings
Episode	Air date	Nationwide	Seoul National Capital Area	TNms ratings	Nationwide	TNms ratings
1	July 13, 2017	1.476%	1.930%	1.5%	0.781%	-
2	July 20, 2017	1.154%	1.277%	1.1%	0.529%	-
3	July 27, 2017	0.869%	-	1.4%	0.504%	-
4	August 3, 2017	0.8%	-	1.1%	-	-
5	August 17, 2017	-	-	-	0.6%	0.6%
6	August 24, 2017	-	-	-	-	0.5%
7	August 31, 2017	-	-	-	-	0.5%
8	September 8, 2017	-	-	-	-	0.6%
9	September 15, 2017	-	-	-	0.4%	-
10	September 22, 2017	-	-	-	-	-
11	September 29, 2017	-	-	-	0.4%	0.7%
