= Supersonic (Fromis 9 song) =

Single by Fromis 9

from the album Supersonic
- Language: Korean
- Released: August 12, 2024
- Genre: Miami bass
- Length: 2:54
- Label: Pledis; YG Plus
- Composers: Baekgom; Joel Malka; Josh McClelland; Louise Frick Sveen; Jin Jeon; Hwang Jae-hyeon
- Lyricists: Cho Su-jin; Zaya; Hong Eun-hui; Maryjane; Jeong Eun-gi; Baekgom; Joel Malka; Josh McClelland; Louise Frick Sveen

Fromis 9 singles chronology
"#menow" (2023)	"Supersonic" (2024)	"From" (2024)

Music video
- "Supersonic" on YouTube

"Supersonic" is a song recorded by South Korean girl group Fromis 9 for their fifth single album of the same name. It was released as the album's lead single by Pledis Entertainment on August 12, 2024.

== Background and release ==
On July 18, 2024, Pledis Entertainment announced that Fromis 9 would be releasing their fifth single album Supersonic on August 12. Five days later, the promotional schedule was released. On July 24, the track listing was released with "Supersonic" announced as the lead single. On August 6, the highlight medley teaser video was released, followed by the music video teaser four days later. The song was released alongside its music video and the single album on August 12.

== Composition ==
"Supersonic" was written and composed by Baekgom, Joel Malka, Josh McClelland, and Louise Frick Sveen, with Cho Su-jin, Zaya, Hong Eun-hui, Maryjane, and Jeong Eun-gi participating in the lyrics writing, and Jin Jeon and Hwang Jae-hyeon participating in the composition. It was described as a "summer" Miami bass song characterized by "a harmonious blend of heavy bass and fast-paced beats" with lyrics about "a heroine attending to situation at supersonic speeds at any time in their daily life exhausted by the scorching heat". "Supersonic" was composed in the key of F-sharp minor, with a tempo of 140 beats per minute.

== Music video ==
The music video was directed by Jooyeong Yun of Earthluk. In line with the summer theme of the album, the visual depicts the group "lounging in the summer heat in the day" with scenes of them dancing in a shipping container yard at night.

== Promotion ==
Following the release of Supersonic, Fromis 9 performed in the first week on South Korean music programs: KBS's Music Bank on August 16, MBC's Show! Music Core on August 17, and SBS's Inkigayo on August 18. During their second and final week of promoting, Fromis 9 performed at SBS M's The Show on August 20, MNET's M Countdown on August 22, Music Bank on August 23, Show! Music Core on August 24, and Inkigayo on August 25.

== Commercial performance ==
In South Korea, "Supersonic" debuted and peaked at number two on the Circle Digital Chart before dropping to number twenty, making it their highest charting song on the chart to date. It also makes "Supersonic" their longest song to stay in the top 20 of the chart. Their previous highest charting song was "#menow", which peaked at number 14.

== Accolades ==
During the song's promotional period on South Korean music programs, "Supersonic" achieved four first place wins.

Music Program Wins for "Supersonic"
Program	Date	Ref.
The Show	August 20, 2024	
M Countdown	August 22, 2024	
Music Bank	August 23, 2024	
Show! Music Core	August 24, 2024	

== Credits and personnel ==
Credits adapted from liner notes of Supersonic.

Studio

- Bukegeugui Studio – recording
- Hybe Studio – recording, digital editing
- Prismfilter Studio – recording
- Prismfilter Engineering Lab – mixing
- 821 Sound Mastering – mastering

Personnel

- Fromis 9 – vocals
- C'SA – background vocals
- Baekgom – background vocals, lyrics, composition, recording, synthesiser
- Louise Frick Sveen – background vocals, lyrics, composition
- Joel Malka – lyrics, composition, synthesiser
- Josh McClelland – lyrics, composition
- Cho Su-jin – lyrics
- Zaya – lyrics
- Hong Eun-hui – lyrics
- Maryjane – lyrics
- Jeong Eun-gi – lyrics
- Jin Jeon – composition, recording, mixing
- Hwang Jae-hyeon – composition
- Kim Soo-jeong – recording, digital editing
- Lee Byeong-wook – digital editing
- Kwon Nam-woo – mastering

== Charts ==
=== Weekly charts ===
Weekly chart performance for "Supersonic"
Chart (2024)	Peak position
South Korea (Circle)	2

=== Monthly charts ===
Monthly chart performance for "Supersonic"
Chart (2024)	Position
South Korea (Circle)	8

=== Year-end charts ===
Year-end chart performance for "Supersonic"
Chart	Year	Position
South Korea (Circle)	2024	68
South Korea (Circle)	2025	51

== Release history ==
Release history for "Supersonic"
Region	Date	Format	Label
Various	August 12, 2024	Digital download; streaming	Pledis; YG Plus

== See also ==
- List of The Show Chart winners (2024)
- List of M Countdown Chart winners (2024)
- List of Music Bank Chart winners (2024)
- List of Show! Music Core Chart winners (2024)
