= Jang Gyu-ri =

South Korean actress (born 1997)

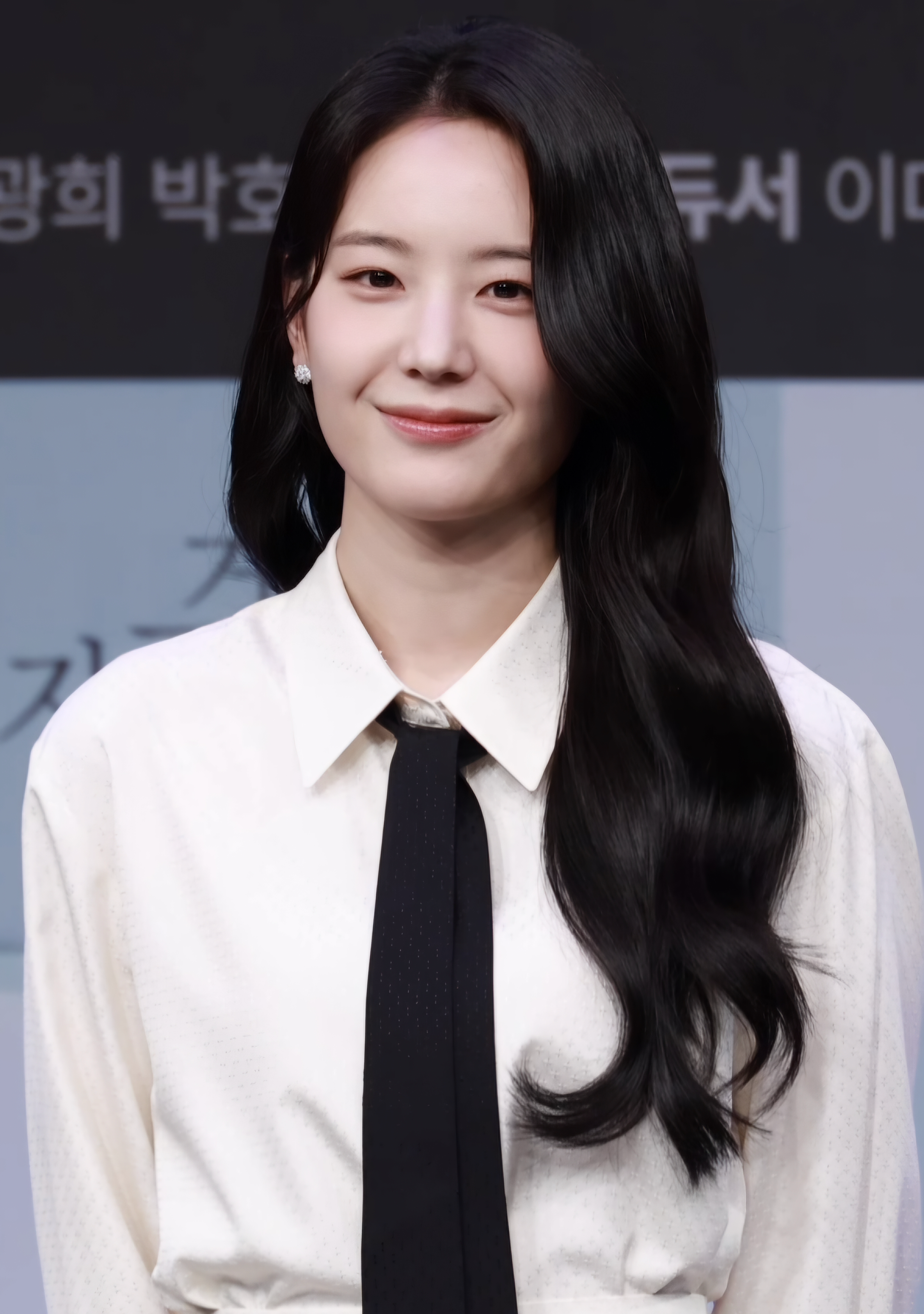
- Jang in November 2024
- Born: December 27, 1997 (age 28); Seoul, South Korea
- Education: Seoul Institute of the Arts
- Occupations: Actress; singer
- Years active: 2017–present
- Agent: Namoo Actors
- Musical career
- Genre: K-pop
- Instrument: Vocals
- Years active: 2017–2022
- Labels: Stone Music; Off the Record; Pledis
- Formerly of: Fromis 9; Happy Pledis

Korean name
- Hangul: 장규리
- Hanja: 張圭悧
- RR: Jang Gyuri
- MR: Chang Kyuri

Jang Gyu-ri (Korean: 장규리, born December 27, 1997) is a South Korean actress and former singer. She finished ninth in Mnet's girl group survival show Idol School, becoming a member of the resulting girl group Fromis 9, but left after her contract expired with Pledis Entertainment in July 2022, and later transitioned to an acting career. She gained more recognition after starring in the television series It's Okay to Not Be Okay (2020).

== Early life and education ==
Jang Gyu-ri was born on December 27, 1997, in Seoul, South Korea. She attended Seoul Institute of the Arts, majoring in acting.

== Career ==
=== 2017: Pre-debut ===
In 2017, Jang made a cameo in KBS drama Ms. Perfect before she became a trainee.

Later that year, Jang participated in the Mnet reality-survival program Idol School to form a new girl group. Jang placed 9th overall in the show's finale on September 29, becoming a member of Fromis 9. On November 29, Jang, together with Fromis 9, performed their pre-debut single titled "Glass Shoes" at the 2017 Mnet Asian Music Awards in Japan.

=== 2018: Debut with Fromis 9 and Produce 48 ===
Jang officially made her debut as a member of Fromis 9 with the EP To. Heart on January 24, 2018.

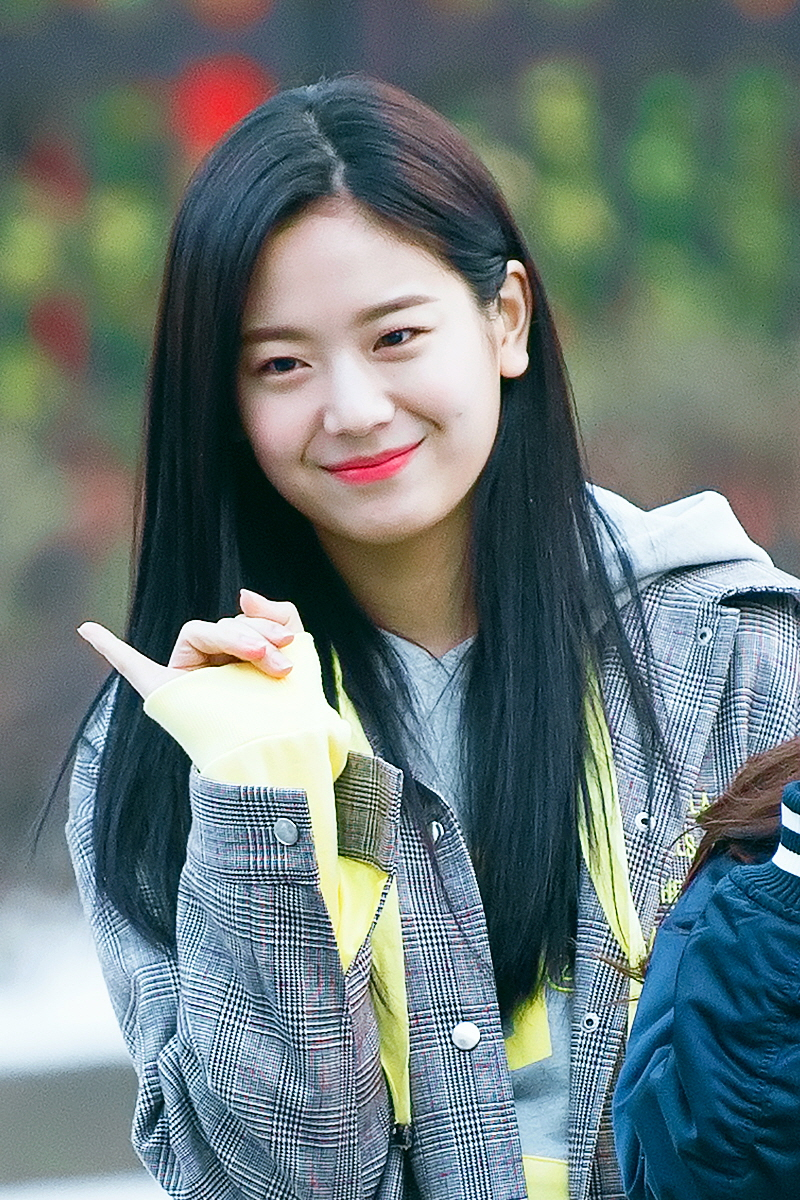
Jang in 2018

On May 10, it was confirmed that Jang would be representing Stone Music Entertainment alongside Jo Yu-ri and 2 other contestants in Produce 48. She revealed that she had participated in the show in hopes of growing and further improving on herself. Jang was eventually eliminated after finishing in 25th place at the 3rd elimination round. She then returned to Fromis 9.

=== 2019–2020: Acting debut ===
On May 10, 2019, Jang made her acting debut and starred in the web drama Dating Class as Kang Ji-young.

In 2020, she starred in the tvN television series It's Okay to Not Be Okay, where she gained more recognition.

=== 2022–present: Departure from Fromis 9 and solo activities ===
On July 28, 2022, Pledis Entertainment announced that member Jang would be leaving Fromis 9 on July 31. Jang chose to maintain the conditions of the original contract with her former agency CJ E&M that would last only one year and not sign the new contract with Pledis Entertainment.

She starred in the SBS television series Cheer Up in the second half of 2022, making it her first project since leaving the group. In August 2022, Jang signed an exclusive contract with Just Entertainment as an actress.

In June 2024, Jang left Just Entertainment after her contract expired. In September, Jang signed with new agency Namoo Actors. She was cast in MBC television series When the Phone Rings later that month, receiving praise for her performance.

== Discography ==
=== Soundtrack appearances ===
Title	Year	Album
"Height" (높이) (with Han Ji-hyun, Bae In-hyuk, Kim Hyun-jin)	2022	Cheer Up OST

== Filmography ==
=== Television series ===
Year	Title	Role	Notes	Ref.
2017	Ms. Perfect	Student	Cameo	
2020	It's Okay to Not Be Okay	Sun Byul		
2022	Cheer Up	Tae Cho-hee		
2024	Flex X Cop	Tae Cho-hee	Cameo (episode 4)	
2024	Pyramid Game	Miryo Group Twins (Lee Soo-min & Lee Soo-jin)	Cameo (episode 10)	
2024	Player	Cha Jae-yi	Season 2	
2024	O'pening 2024: "Our Beautiful Summer"	Choi Yeo-reum		
2024	When the Phone Rings	Na Yu-ri		
2026	Four Hands, Two Sonatas	Hong Jae-in		

=== Web series ===
Year	Title	Role	Ref.
2019	Dating Class	Kang Ji-young	

=== Television shows ===
Year	Title	Role	Notes	Ref.
2017	Idol School	Contestant	Survival show that determined Fromis 9 members Finished 9th	
2018	Produce 48	Contestant	Survival show that determined Iz*One members Finished 25th	
2019	King of Mask Singer	Contestant	As Spring Flowers (Episode 195)	

== Awards and nominations ==
Name of the award ceremony, year presented, category, nominee of the award, and the result of the nomination
Award ceremony	Year	Category	Nominee / Work	Result	Ref.
MBC Drama Awards	2024	Best New Actress	When the Phone Rings	Nominated	
SBS Drama Awards	2022	Excellence Award, Actress in a Miniseries Romance/Comedy Drama	Cheer Up	Nominated	
SBS Drama Awards	2022	Best New Actress	Cheer Up	Won	
SBS Drama Awards	2022	Best Supporting Team (Note: with Bae In-hyuk, Han Ji-hyun, Jang Gyu-ri, Kim Hyun-jin, Ryu Hyun-kyung, Yang Dong-geun, Kim Shin-bi, Lee Eun-saem, Lee Jung-jun, Han Soo-ah and Hyun Woo-seok)	Cheer Up	Won	
