= Fromis 9 =

South Korean girl group

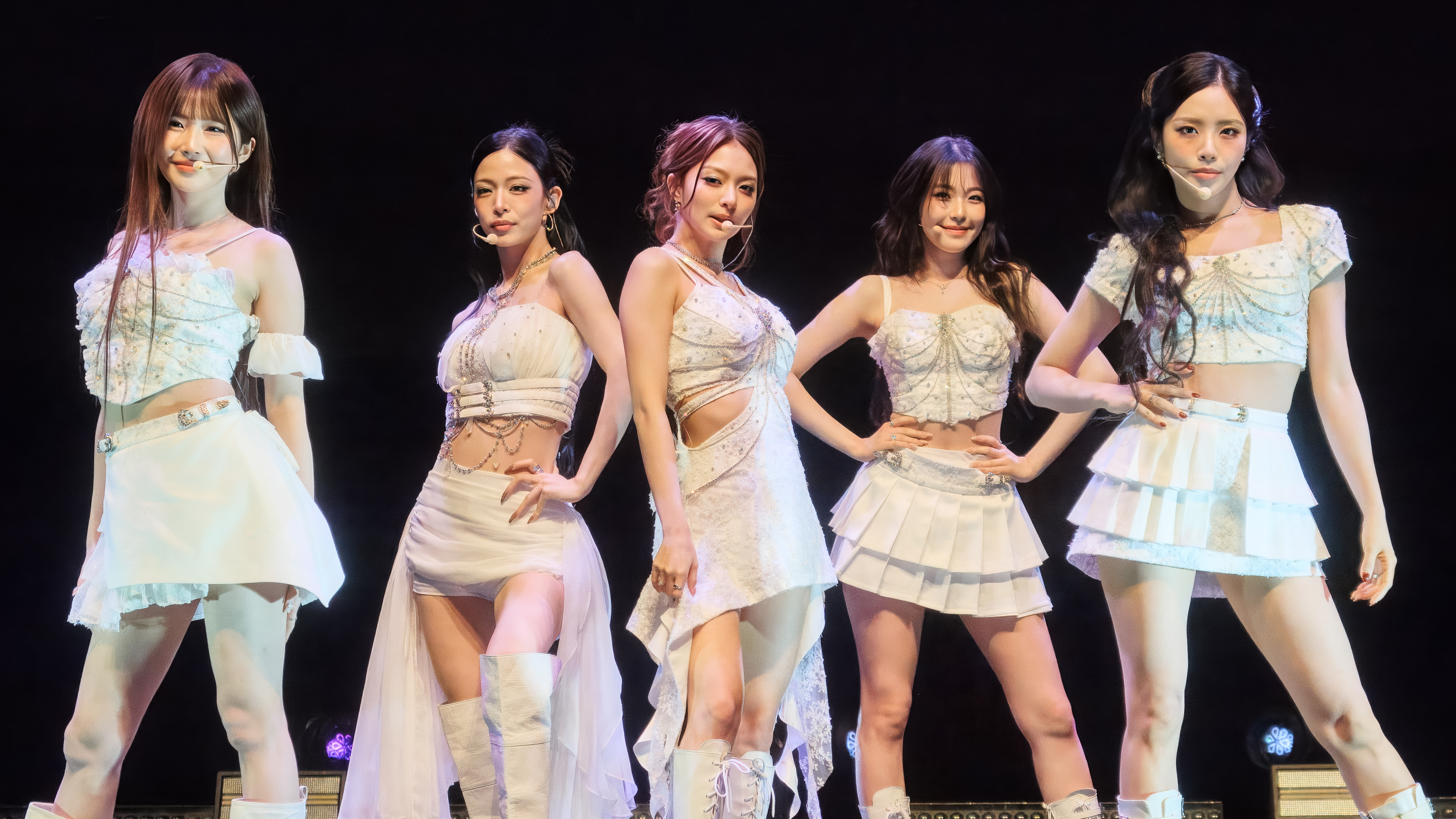
- Fromis 9 in September 2025; L–R: Song Ha-young, Lee Chae-young, Lee Na-gyung, Baek Ji-heon and Park Ji-won

Background information
- Origin: Seoul, South Korea
- Genres: K-pop; teen pop; synth-pop
- Works: Discography
- Years active: 2018–present
- Labels: Stone; Off the Record; Pledis; EMI/Universal Japan; Geffen; Asnd
- Members: Song Ha-young; Park Ji-won; Lee Chae-young; Lee Na-gyung; Baek Ji-heon
- Past members: Lee Sae-rom; Jang Gyu-ri; Roh Ji-sun; Lee Seo-yeon

Fromis 9 (Korean: 프로미스나인; styled in snake_case as fromis_9) is a South Korean girl group. The group consists of five members: Song Ha-young, Park Ji-won, Lee Chae-young, Lee Na-gyung, and Baek Ji-heon. Fromis 9 was originally a nine-piece group; Jang Gyu-ri departed the group in July 2022, and Lee Sae-rom, Roh Ji-sun, and Lee Seo-yeon departed in February 2025.

Since their formation through the 2017 reality show Idol School, the group has experienced multiple management changes. They debuted on January 24, 2018, with the release of the extended play (EP), To. Heart, under the management of Stone Music Entertainment and creative direction and music production of Pledis Entertainment. Their management then transitioned to Off the Record Entertainment in September 2018, a new label founded by Stone Music. Pledis Entertainment took over management of the group from 2021 until 2024. In January 2025, five members of the group signed with Asnd and in June released their sixth EP, From Our 20's.

== Name ==
The group's name "Fromis_" was suggested by netizens through the official Idol School website and chosen by CJ E&M, with described as "From Idol School" and "Promise" in Korean pronunciation, also means "to keep their promise [to viewers] to be the best girl group". Through the announcement of their social media accounts by their agency, the group decided to add 9 in their name to be "fromis_9".

== History ==
=== Pre-debut: Formation through Idol School and "Glass Shoes" ===
In March 2017, it was announced that Mnet, the same channel responsible for several notable survival shows including Sixteen and Produce 101, would be launching a new reality survival show titled Idol School to form a new girl group. The show premiered on July 13 and ended on September 29, with Roh Ji-sun, Song Ha-young, Lee Sae-rom, Lee Chae-young, Lee Na-gyung, Park Ji-won, Lee Seo-yeon, Baek Ji-heon, and Jang Gyu-ri as the nine members of Fromis. The final line-up was solely decided through live and online votes of viewers. Pledis Entertainment, led by CEO Han Sung-soo, managed the group's training and debut.

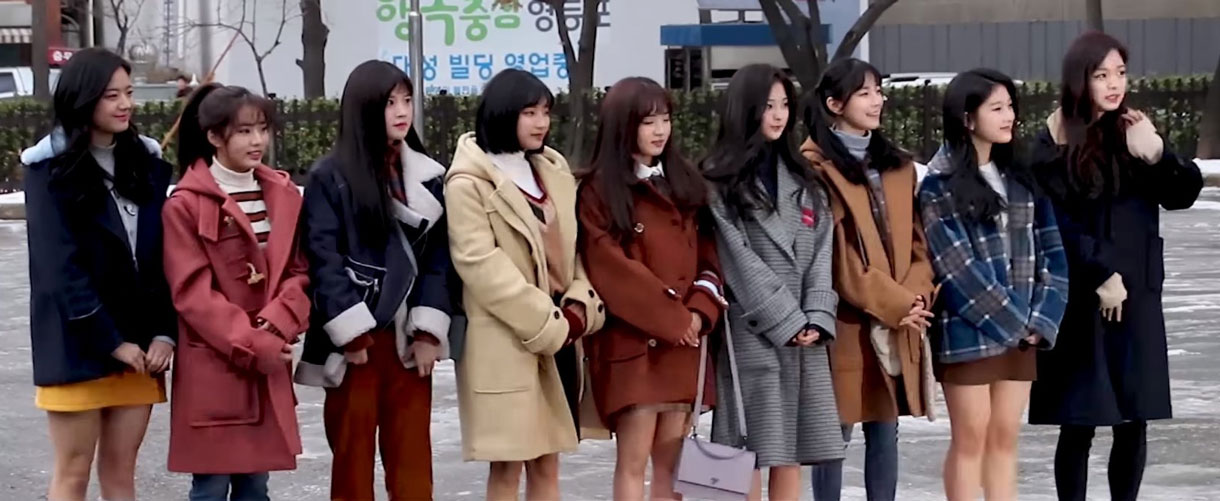
Fromis 9 at Music Bank on December 15, 2017, ahead of their official debut

Fromis premiered its own reality program on October 19 titled Fromis' Room about continuing the path to debut. It followed the format of a simulcast, where it combined pre-recorded materials and replays of Facebook Live broadcasts in their dorm. The group's name was later changed to Fromis 9 following the final episode of Fromis' Room on November 23, with the "9" meaning the nine students who graduated from Idol School.

On November 29, Fromis 9 performed their pre-debut single titled "Glass Shoes" at the 2017 Mnet Asian Music Awards in Japan. The song was released as a digital single the following day. They also performed the song on the December 15 episode of Music Bank, marking the group's first-ever appearance in a music program.

=== 2018–2021: Debut with To. Heart and time under Off The Record ===
On January 8, 2018, it was announced that Fromis 9 would officially debut with their first extended play (EP) titled To. Heart. The EP, along with its lead single of the same name, was released on January 24. The EP debuted at number 4 on the Gaon Album Chart issued on January 27.

On May 4, it was confirmed that Jang Gyu-ri had entered as a contestant in Produce 48. Fromis 9 continued as an eight-member group and released their second EP, To. Day, on June 5, without Jang due to her participation in the show. Fromis 9 went back to being a nine-member group after Jang was eliminated in the 3rd elimination as she ranked at 25th place. Starting from September 21, Fromis 9 would be managed under Off The Record Entertainment, a new agency exclusively established for Fromis 9 and South Korean-Japanese girl group, Iz*One.

The group released a special single album titled From.9 on October 10 with the lead single, "Love Bomb". It was their first release with all 9 members after the return of Jang Gyu-ri. On October 30, Fromis 9 made their acting debut in a web series, Welcome to Heal Inn, on their official VLive page. The series was filmed during Jang's absence.

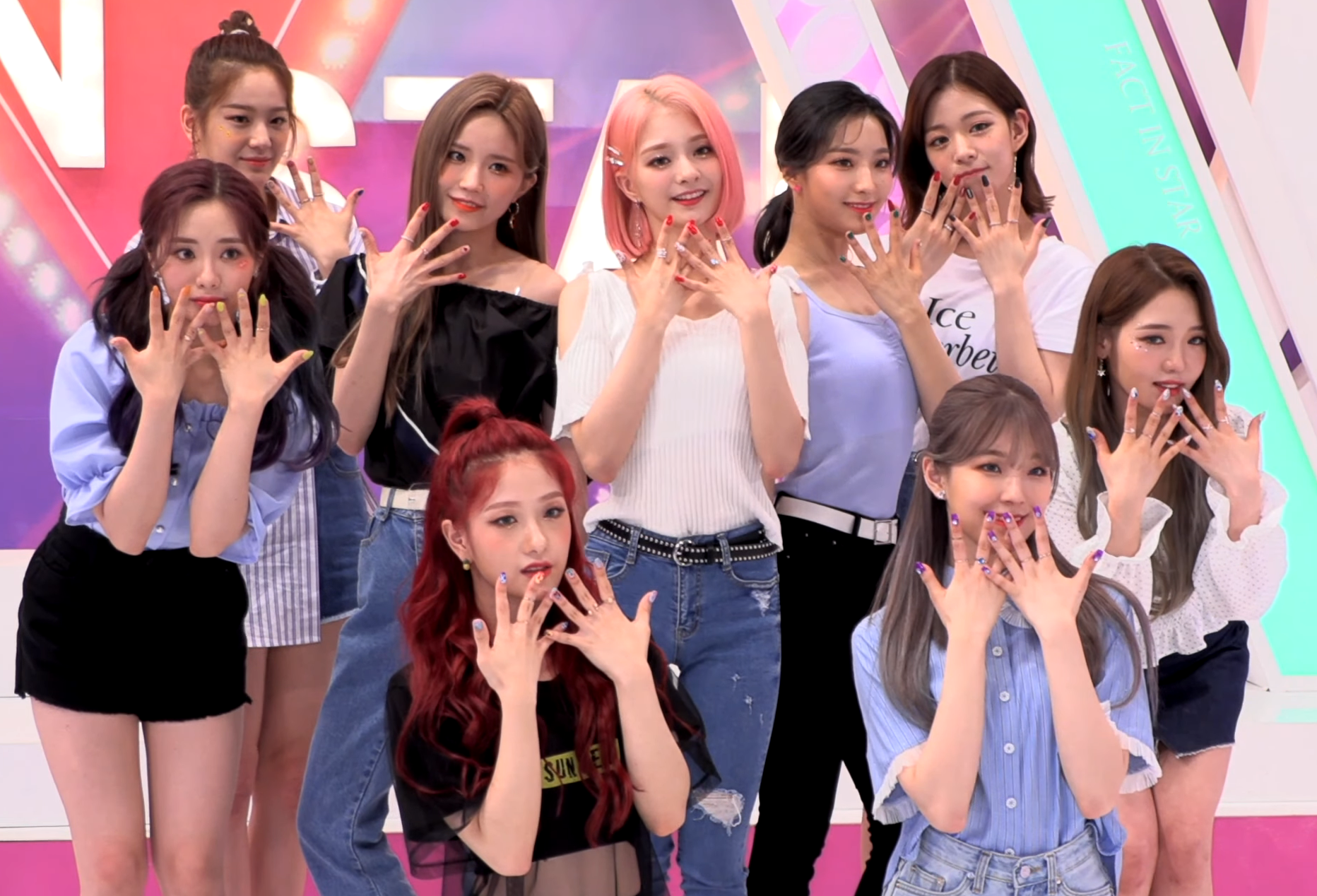
Fromis 9 in June 2019 promoting Fun Factory

On February 8, 2019, a second short/mini season of Welcome to Heal Inn was announced for the Winter Season, this time with Jang Gyu-ri added as a new traveller. In May, Jang made her solo acting debut in the web drama, Compulsory Dating Education.

On June 4, Fromis 9 released their first single album Fun Factory, featuring the lead single "Fun!". The album reached number 2 on the Gaon Album Chart, a new high for the group. The group released their third EP My Little Society on September 16, 2020, with lead single "Feel Good (Secret Code)". On September 10, Off The Record confirmed that Lee Seo-yeon would sit out of all promotions for the EP due to a recent leg injury, and the group would promote as eight members. The EP reached no. 3 on the Gaon Album Chart. On May 17, the group released their second single album 9 Way Ticket, featuring the lead single "We Go".

=== 2021–2022: Move to Pledis Entertainment, first music show win, and Jang Gyu-ri's departure ===
On August 16, 2021, it was announced that Fromis 9 had departed from Off The Record and that Pledis Entertainment would take over the group's management. On September 1, the group had their first release under the new label with the special single "Talk & Talk". On September 7, the group achieved their first ever music show win on SBS MTV's The Show with "Talk & Talk". A day later, Song Ha-young, Park Ji-won, and Lee Seo-yeon released the song, "Star" (별), a remake of the OST track of the same name from the 2006 film Beauty is Painful.

On January 17, 2022, Fromis 9 released their fourth EP Midnight Guest, featuring the lead single "DM". On February 24, it was announced that Baek Ji-heon would be taking a break from activities due to health concerns. Baek returned to activities with the release of the group's fifth EP From Our Memento Box, released June 27, featuring the lead single "Stay This Way". On July 24, Fromis 9 released a cover of IU and Fiestar's single "Sea of Moonlight" as a part of Re:born Project's Summer Vacation Project.

On July 28, 2022, Pledis Entertainment announced that Jang Gyu-ri would be leaving the group on July 31 with Fromis 9 continuing as an eight-member group. In their press release, Pledis stated that when Fromis 9's management was transferred to the company in 2021, every other member signed a completely new contract with the company and only Jang chose to transfer her original contract from CJ ENM's Off The Record that would last only one year.

=== 2022–2024: Unlock My World, Supersonic, and departure from Pledis Entertainment ===
On October 28, it was announced that Lee Sae-rom and Lee Seo-yeon would be taking a break from activities due to health concerns. Sae-rom returned to activities at the end of that year, during a performance at 2022 SBS Gayo Daejeon. Seo-yeon also returned to activities by the event.

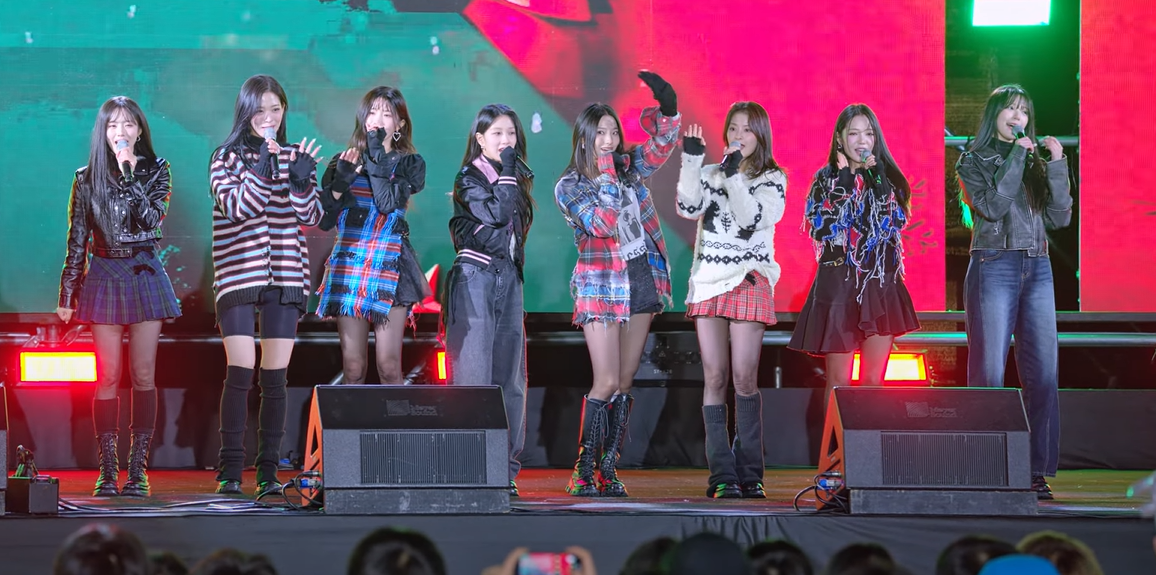
Fromis 9 performing at the 2023 Damyang Meta Music Festival

On May 15, 2023, Pledis Entertainment announced Fromis 9 would be releasing their first studio album titled Unlock My World on June 5, which would also be their first release as an eight-member group. On October 11, the group released the single "Love Me Back" as part of the soundtrack for the Naver webtoon Operation: True Love. In July 2024, Fromis 9 were confirmed to be preparing for a new album, set for release in August. During July, the group also performed at a series of festivals, including Weverse Con, Kwave Music Festival in Manila and their first ever appearances at Waterbomb festival across three cities. On July 18, Fromis 9 announced their fifth single album titled Supersonic, which was released on August 12. The album's lead single peaked at number two on South Korea's Circle Chart.

On November 29, Pledis Entertainment announced that the exclusive contracts with Fromis 9 would officially expire on December 31. On December 6, it was announced that they would be releasing the single "From" on December 23, before departing from the label.

=== 2025–present: Reformation as five, From Our 20's and first world tour ===
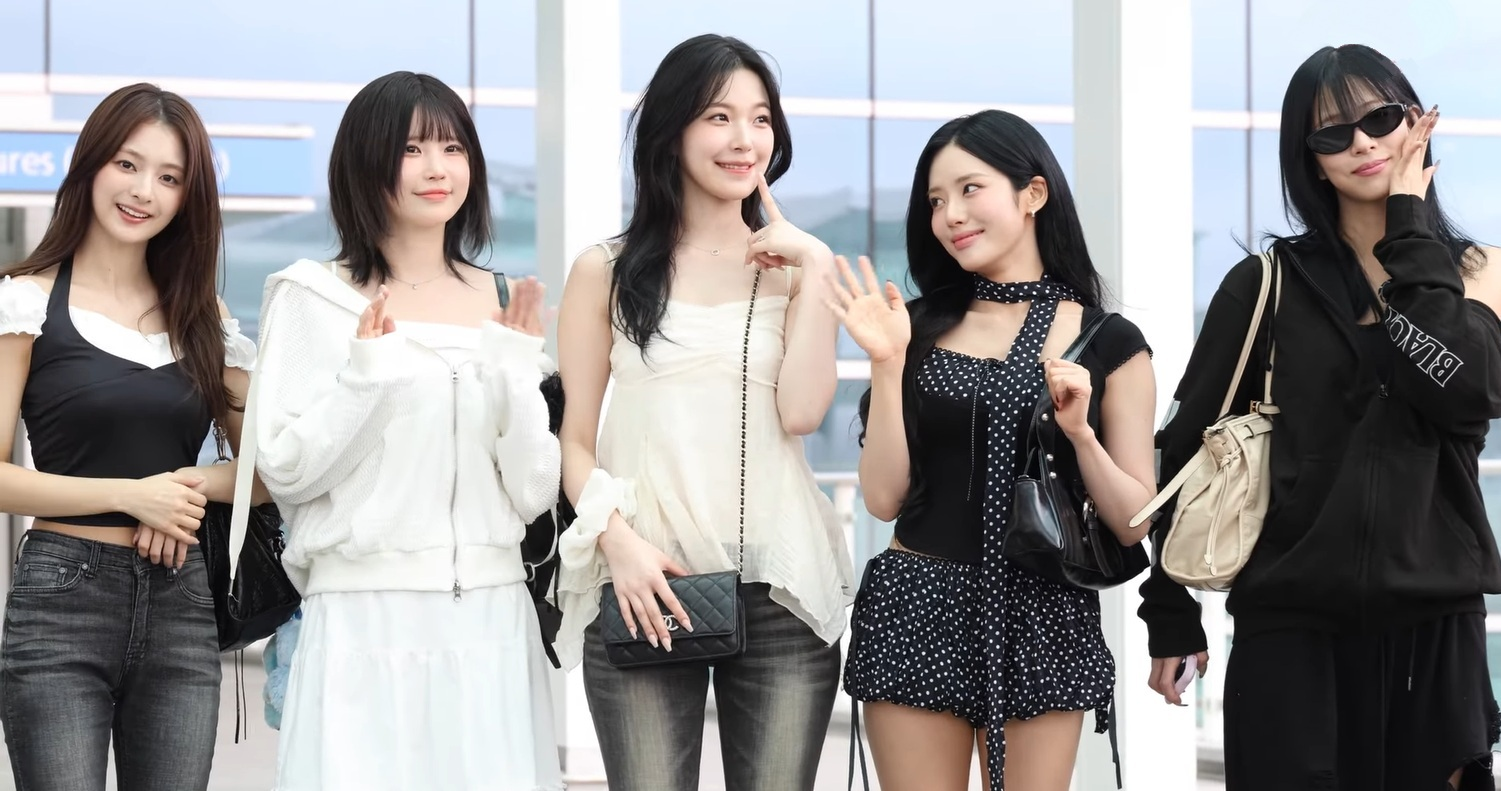
Fromis 9 at Incheon Airport in 2025

In January 2025, it was announced that five members—Song Ha-young, Park Ji-won, Lee Na-kyung, Lee Chae-young, and Baek Ji-heon—had transferred to the label Asnd, while Lee Sae-rom, Lee Seo-yeon, and Roh Ji-sun did not join, with the use of the group name still in discussion with the former agency. In February, Lee Sae-rom confirmed in an interview that she, along with Lee Seo-yeon and Roh Ji-sun, would not be continuing with the group. In March, it was confirmed that the group could continue using its original name, and a trailer featuring the five remaining members was released.

Asnd later announced that the group was preparing for new music, to be released in June 2025. On June 9, Asnd announced the group would release its sixth EP, From Our 20's. On June 11, it was announced that they would be embarking on their first world tour, Now Tomorrow, kicking off in Seoul on August 9 and 10. From Our 20's was released on June 25, alongside its summer-themed lead single, "Like You Better". "Like You Better" earned the group a first place trophy on the July 4 broadcast of Music Bank.

In November 2025, Asnd announced that the group would be releasing new music in December, with a "winter carol that suits the winter season". On November 21, it was announced that they would be remaking Kim Min-jong's "White Memories" for a special digital single release in December. It was released on December 2. "White Memories" entered the top ten of Circle Chart and won first place on Music Bank.

In February 2026, Asnd announced the group would make their Japanese debut on April 1 with their first Japanese EP, Like You Better (Japanese Ver.). The EP features the Japanese versions of "Like You Better" and "Love=Disaster" and a new single, "Sky Runner". On July 21, Fromis 9 released their second studio album, Glow Me, with the lead single "Vitamin Me". "Vitamin Me" achieved three music show wins.

== Artistry ==
=== Musical style ===
Fromis 9 was noted by Billboard for consistently releasing "upbeat, feel-good pop releases", citing "Love Bomb" and "We Go" as an example. Their releases before 2020 were described as "a relatively broad range within the dance-pop sound". After their release with "Feel Good (Secret Code) in 2020, they shifted from a synth-pop and bubblegum pop sound towards a more "funky retro-pop" sound.

For their first ever full-length album, "Unlock My World", Fromis 9 tackled a variety of genres including R&B, dance pop, UK garage and city pop. Their 2024 single, "Supersonic", was a Miami bass track that sonically departed from earlier releases, being a more "energetic track". They then made a return to the synth-pop sound with their 2025 single, "Like You Better".

Fromis 9 have been noted by critic, Lee Moon-won, for distinguishing themselves by appealing towards the Korean male audience during a time where other girl groups adopted a "girl crush" concept and strong electronic music to appeal to the overseas market. A popular music critic, Kim Do-heon, stated that Fromis 9's musical releases were consistent, "easy listening" and highlighted each member's individuality.

=== Production & lyrics ===
Their music is produced and written by a variety of musical collaborators, with the members actively participating in the songwriting and production. Jiheon co-wrote "Up And" for their 2022 EP, "From Our Memento Box" and "Prom Night" for their 2023 album, "Unlock My World". Ex-member, Seoyeon, also have a few writing and production credits throughout their discography, co-writing "Coloring" for their first special single album, "From.9", sharing a writing credit on their 2018 single, "DKDK" with member, Jiwon, and having a writing & production credit on "Hush Hush" from their 2022 EP, "Midnight Guest".

Jiwon has a sole writing credit on "Wishlist" on "Unlock My World", a writing credit on "Beat The Heat" from their 2024 single album, "Supersonic" and many more. Hayoung co-wrote "Fly High" from their second single album, "Fun Factory", with member Jiwon, "Twisted Love" from their 2025 EP, "From Our 20s", and many more. The other members, notably including Saerom and Nagyung, have also wrote and produced a few songs.

The members have also discussed their songwriting process in various interviews. For their "Supersonic" album, member Jiwon said that the lyrics for "Beat The Heat" were worked on by the members separately with the "Take A Chance" lyrics being written and refined together. Member, Jiwon and Seoyeon used a "visual approach" to songwriting for "Hush Hush" from their EP, "Midnight Guest", working on the track with a vivid image in their head.

== Endorsements ==
In 2017, Fromis 9 was selected by Ivy Club, a Korean school uniform brand, to be their exclusive models. They were the first girl group chosen to model by the brand since Wonder Girls in 2009. The group would collaborate with PUBG Mobile in 2021 for a special event, offering limited edition voicelines and in-game items to the players. The skincare brand, NEOGEN, would select Fromis 9 as their models in 2022, stating that the group's "bright, vibrant image" aligns with the brand's vision. In June 2026, the group collaborated with Aion 2 for an event, offering special models, emotes and items.

In September 2024, Chaeyoung was selected as the model for the streetwear brand, Supra. In November 2024, Jiheon was selected as the new model for the haircare brand, Celluver. In March 2025, Jiheon would become the model for colored lenses brand, Lenssis, with the "Marina Choco" lenses created in collaboration between the two experiencing a surge in orders immediately after release. In June 2025, Jiheon became the model for Hatai Ice's flagship products, Pollapo & Ice Guy, and filmed a commercial for it. In December 2025, the skincare brand, Dr.G, chose Nagyung as the model for their product, "Black Snail Retinol Ampoule". In June 2026, the group was selected by a card trading company, Telaca, to be the models for their K-POP idol card trading collection, "Miimca".

== Public image ==
Nicknamed "The Military President" by the media for their popularity among South Korean soldiers, Fromis 9's popularity has been noted by many male celebrities such as Ha Sungwoon, Ong Seongwu, Jung Seunghwan, A.C.E's Jun, and more. The group has also been called "The Summer Queens" by both critics and Koreans due to their summer hits such as "We Go", "Stay This Way", "Supersonic" and "Like You Better".

== Members ==
=== Current ===
- Song Ha-young (송하영)
- Park Ji-won (박지원)
- Lee Chae-young (이채영)
- Lee Na-gyung (이나경)
- Baek Ji-heon (백지헌)

=== Former ===
- Jang Gyu-ri (장규리; 2018–2022)
- Lee Sae-rom (이새롬; 2018–2025) – former leader
- Roh Ji-sun (노지선; 2018–2025)
- Lee Seo-yeon (이서연; 2018–2025)

== Discography ==
Studio albums

- Unlock My World (2023)
- Glow Me (2026)

== Filmography ==
=== Television shows ===
Year	Title	Notes	Ref.
2017	Idol School	Survival show determining Fromis 9's members	

== Live performances ==
=== Concert tours ===
==== Love From Tour ====
In 2022, Fromis 9 held their first solo concerts since debuting. They performed the show three times in Seoul before taking it to Japan for a single night.

List of concerts, showing event names, dates, cities, countries, venues and attendance
Date (2022)	City	Country	Venue	Ref.
September 30	Seoul	South Korea	KBS Arena	
October 1	Seoul	South Korea	KBS Arena	
October 2	Seoul	South Korea	KBS Arena	
October 7	Tokyo	Japan	Tachikawa Stage Garden	

==== Now Tomorrow Tour ====
On June 12, 2025, Asnd announced that Fromis 9 would be going on their first world tour, starting with three stops in Seoul in August. A United States leg was announced on July 1. On July 23, the Asian leg was announced. On December 21, 2025, the encore leg in Seoul was announced. On January 7, 2026, Asnd added a third Seoul date due to popular demand. On January 8, 2026, the encore leg in Tokyo was announced, with two shows on February 28th.

List of concerts, showing event names, dates, cities, countries, venues and attendance
Date (2025–2026)	City	Country	Venue	Attendance	Ref.
August 8	Seoul	South Korea	Jangchung Arena	—	
August 9	Seoul	South Korea	Jangchung Arena	—	
August 10	Seoul	South Korea	Jangchung Arena	—	
August 26	New York	United States	Palladium Times Square	—	
August 28	Washington	United States	Warner Theatre	—	
August 30	Chicago	United States	Chicago Theatre	—	
September 2	Phoenix	United States	Mullett Arena	—	
September 4	Los Angeles	United States	Orpheum Theatre	—	
September 6	Oakland	United States	Paramount Theatre	—	
September 8	Seattle	United States	McCaw Hall	—	
September 23	Tokyo	Japan	Zepp Haneda	—	
October 19	Taipei	Taiwan	NTU Sports Center	—	
October 24	Hong Kong	China	MacPherson Stadium	—	
January 30	Seoul	South Korea	Korea University Hwajeong Tiger Dome	—	
January 31	Seoul	South Korea	Korea University Hwajeong Tiger Dome	—	
February 1	Seoul	South Korea	Korea University Hwajeong Tiger Dome	—	
February 28	Tokyo	Japan	Tachikawa Stage Garden	—	

=== Headlining concerts ===
- From Now (January 27–28, 2024) at Jangchung Arena, Seoul

=== Fan meeting ===
- Fromis Day (April 22–24, 2022) at Blue Square Mastercard Hall, Seoul

=== Festivals ===
Event	Date	City	Country	Venue	Ref.
KCON	April 14, 2018	Chiba	Japan	Makuhari Messe	
KCON	June 24, 2018	Newark	United States	Prudential Center	
KCON	August 12, 2018	Los Angeles	United States	STAPLES Center	
KCON	July 7, 2019	New York	United States	Madison Square Garden	
Super K-Pop Festival	September 29, 2019	Tangerang	Indonesia	Indonesia Convention Exhibition	
Weverse Con	December 31, 2021	Seoul	South Korea	Korea International Exhibition Center	
Weverse Con	June 10, 2023	Seoul	South Korea	Olympic Gymnastics Arena	
Kwave Music Festival	May 11, 2024	Manila	Philippines	Burnham Green	
Weverse Con	June 16, 2024	Incheon	South Korea	Inspire Entertainment Resort	
Waterbomb Festival	July 5, 2024	Seoul	South Korea	Korea International Exhibition Center	
Waterbomb Festival	July 27, 2024	Busan	South Korea	Busan North Port	
Waterbomb Festival	August 3, 2024	Incheon	South Korea	Sangsang Platform	
Ulsan Summer Festival	August 12, 2024	Ulsan	South Korea	Ulsan Sports Complex	
Waterbomb Festival	July 4–6, 2025	Seoul	South Korea	KINTEX Outdoor Global Stage	

== Awards and nominations ==
Name of the award ceremony, year presented, category, nominee of the award, and the result of the nomination
Award ceremony	Year	Category	Nominee / Work	Result	Ref.
Asia Artist Awards	2018	Most Popular Artists (Singer) – Top 50	Fromis 9	Nominated	
Asia Artist Awards	2018	Rising Award	Fromis 9	Won	
Asia Artist Awards	2019	Most Popular Artists (Singer) – Top 50	Fromis 9	Nominated	
Asia Artist Awards	2019	Starnews Popularity Award (Female Group)	Fromis 9	Nominated	
Asia Artist Awards	2021	Female Idol Group Popularity Award	Fromis 9	Nominated	
Asia Artist Awards	2023	Popularity Award – Singer (Female)	Fromis 9	Nominated	
Asia Model Awards	2018	New Star Award (Singer)	Fromis 9	Won	
Brand Customer Loyalty Award	2021	Hot Trend Female Idol Group	Fromis 9	Won	
Brand of the Year Awards	2021	Hot Trend Female Idol	Fromis 9	Won	
Broadcast Advertising Festival	2023	CF Star Award	Fromis 9	Won	
Gaon Chart Music Awards	2019	New Artist of the Year	Fromis 9	Nominated	
Genie Music Awards	2018	Artist of the Year	Fromis 9	Nominated	
Genie Music Awards	2018	Best New Female Artist	Fromis 9	Nominated	
Genie Music Awards	2018	Genie Music Popularity Award	Fromis 9	Nominated	
Golden Disc Awards	2019	Rookie of the Year	Fromis 9	Nominated	
Golden Disc Awards	2019	Popularity Award	Fromis 9	Nominated	
Hanteo Music Awards	2023	Post Generation Award	Fromis 9	Won	
K-Global Heart Dream Awards	2022	K-Global Best Performance Award	Fromis 9	Won	
K-Global Heart Dream Awards	2023	K-Global Best Music Video Award	Fromis 9	Won	
Korea Popular Music Awards	2018	Rookie of the Year	Fromis 9	Nominated	
Melon Music Awards	2018	Best New Artist	Fromis 9	Nominated	
Mnet Asian Music Awards	2018	Best New Female Artist	Fromis 9	Nominated	
Mnet Asian Music Awards	2021	Worldwide Fan's Choice Top 10	Fromis 9	Shortlisted	
Seoul Music Awards	2019	New Artist Award	Fromis 9	Nominated	
Seoul Music Awards	2019	Popularity Award	Fromis 9	Nominated	
Seoul Music Awards	2019	Hallyu Special Award	Fromis 9	Nominated	
V Live Awards	2019	Rookie Top 5	Fromis 9	Won	
