= Stone Music =

South Korean music distribution company

- Native name: 스톤 뮤직
- Formerly: Mediopia (Note: June 29, 1994 – September 29, 2006); Mnet Media (Note: September 30, 2006 – December 31, 2010); CJ E&M Music (Note: January 1, 2011 – April 2, 2018); Stone Music Entertainment (Note: April 3, 2018 – June 30, 2026)
- Type: Subsidiary
- Industry: Distribution
- Predecessor: Mediopia; MaxMP3; GM Agency; ID Incheon Entertainment
- Founded: June 29, 1994
- Defunct: April 20, 2021 (music production and management)
- Successor: Wake One
- Headquarters: Seoul, South Korea
- Key people: Jung Hyung-jin (CEO)
- Services: Licensing; Record distribution
- Parent: CJ ENM
- Website: http://stonemusicent.net (archived Fri, 09 Feb 2018 06:30:54 +0000)

Stone Music, formerly Stone Music Entertainment (Korean: 스톤 뮤직 엔터테인먼트) is a South Korean music distribution company under CJ ENM, as part of a partnership with the music streaming store Genie Music since 2021. It was one of the largest co-publisher companies in South Korea.

The company was also formerly a music production and management company, which managed artists such as SG Wannabe, Davichi, Roy Kim, Son Ho-young, Eric Nam, Fromis 9, HEDY, and TO1, before the business closed in April 2021.

Under its previous name CJ E&M Music, it was named Music Distributor of the Year at the Gaon Chart K-Pop Awards in 2014.

== History ==
Former logo of Stone Music Entertainment

The company was originally established as Mediopia in May 1993 and later renamed to Mediopia Technology Co., Ltd in June 1994, as a manufacturer and distributor of electronic devices.

In January 2002, the company was listed on KOSDAQ.

In August 2004, Maekyung Hudson was incorporated as a subsidiary.

In July 2006, their largest shareholder changed from Poibos Co., Ltd. to CJ Corporation and was incorporated as an affiliate of CJ Corporation. The company later became a part of CJ Media Co., Ltd.

In September 2006, the company was later established again as Mnet Media, following the merger with GM Agency, MaxMP3, and ID Icheon Entertainment.

In January 2007, the company established the entertainment company Core Contents Media, then headed by producer Kim Kwang-soo.

In May 2007, CJ Music was merged into Mnet Media, which operated in the music distribution and broadcasting businesses.

In January 2011, Mnet Media was merged into CJ E&M and renamed as CJ E&M Music. Following the merger, the company was revoked from the KOSDAQ listing in March 2011.

In December 2013, CJ E&M Music acquired 19% of Jellyfish Entertainment's shares to form a partnership.

In March 2014, the CJ E&M label system was introduced with Jellyfish Entertainment, The Music Works, MMO Entertainment, and 1877 Entertainment joining the system.

In April 2014, CJ E&M Music launched a joint venture with Japan's Victor Entertainment, which was called CJ Victor Entertainment.

In September 2015, CJ E&M Music acquired B2M Entertainment.

In October 2015, CJ E&M Music signed a strategic partnership deal with the hip-hop label Hi-Lite Records.

In January 2016, CJ E&M Music signed a strategic partnership deal with hip hop label AOMG.

In 2017, CJ E&M Music established a new label named Stone Music Entertainment. The label began producing music for artists under CJ E&M Music, such as Wanna One, Davichi, and JBJ, and managed Idol School's winning group, Fromis 9.

In August 2017, CJ E&M Music established the High Up Entertainment joint venture with the production team Black Eyed Pilseung. In the same month, CJ E&M acquired an additional 32% of Jellyfish Entertainment's shares, beyond the 19% of the label's shares previously acquired in 2013, effectively becoming the label's largest shareholder, with a total stake of 51%.

In November 2017, CJ E&M Music acquired Amoeba Culture.

In April 2018, Stone Music Entertainment was officially registered and CJ E&M later merged into Stone Music Entertainment in May 2018.

In June 2018, Stone Music Entertainment established the exclusive label Swing Entertainment for managing Wanna One since the latter ended their contract with YMC Entertainment, with Shin Dong-il (who is the former manager under YMC Entertainment) as the label head.

In August 2018, CJ E&M sold its 51% stake in High Up Entertainment back to Black Eyed Pilseung, making the former an independent company.

In September 2018, Stone Music Entertainment established the exclusive label Off The Record Entertainment for managing the Produce 48 winners, Iz*One, and Idol School winners Fromis 9.

In October 2018, Genie Music acquired distribution rights to Stone Music Entertainment's releases in digital format after it merged with the latter's sister company, CJ Digital Music. The two companies will still release physical albums separately.

On January 31, 2019, Stone Music Entertainment confirmed the establishment of an exclusive label, LM Entertainment for managing Kang Daniel and Yoon Ji-sung since February 1, following the ending of their contract with MMO Entertainment. The label is headed by Shin Dong-il, who also headed their former label Swing Entertainment during the time in which Wanna One was active.

On April 20, 2021, Sport Kyunghang announced that CJ ENM applied to close Stone Music Entertainment from April 8. According to the news, CJ ENM stated that they are “working on reorganizing its sub-labels for efficiency.”

In May 2021, CJ ENM integrated their music label Stone Music, One Effect, Studio Blue, and Off Record with the launch of a new music label, Wake One Entertainment. The first artist TO1 were confirmed to be managed under the new label.

== Partnerships and Music distributions ==
Labels and Investments

- 143 Entertainment
- Biscuit Entertainment
- Blockberry Creative
- Swing Entertainment
- AOMG
- Amoeba Culture
- H1ghr Music
- HighUp Entertainment
- MNH Entertainment
- Wake One Entertainment
- Jellyfish Entertainment

Distribution

- 143 Entertainment
- Ambition Musik
- Amoeba Culture (affiliate)
- AOMG (affiliate)
- Biscuit Entertainment
- Blockberry Creative
- BRD Entertainment
- Craft&Jun
- Dooroodooroo Artist Company
- Dorothy Company
- Feel Ghood Music
- H1ghr Music (affiliate)
- Hi-Lite Records (affiliate)
- Hybe Corporation
  - Belift Lab (former affiliate)
- 1llionaire Records
- In Next Trend
- Jellyfish Entertainment
- Mapps Entertainment
- MNH Entertainment
- RBW
- Swing Entertainment
- Vismajor Company
- Wake One Entertainment
- WM Entertainment
- YNG & RICH Entertainment
- Ballin ' All Day
- Oui Entertainment
- KQ Entertainment (co-managed by E&M Division with KMP Holdings and Genie Music)
- Star Road Entertainment
- Mnet (for music program releases)
- tvN (for drama soundtrack albums)
- OCN (for drama soundtrack albums)

== Former entities ==
=== Recording artists ===
- Bubble Sisters (2003–2005)
- Hong Jin-young (2006–2008)
- Kim Jong-kook
- SWAN (2007–2008)
- Lee Hyori (2006–2010)
- Ock Joo-hyun
- Yangpa
- Busker Busker (2011-2013)
- TimeZ (co-managed with Super Jet Entertainment)
- Yoo Seung-woo (2012–2015) (managed under sub label UK Muzik)
- Parc Jae-jung (2013–2015)
- Jung Joon-young (2013–2016)
- JJY Band (2015–2016)
- I.O.I (2016–2017/2019) (co-managed with YMC Entertainment and Studio Blu)
- Spica (2012–2017) (co-managed with B2M Entertainment)
- Emma Wu (2016–2017)
- Kevin Oh (2017)
- JBJ (2017–2018) (co-managed with Kakao M's Fave Entertainment)
- Wanna One (2017–2019/2022) (co-managed with Swing Entertainment)
- Lee Seokhoon (2015–2019)
- X1 (2019–2020) (co-managed with Swing Entertainment)
- In2It (2017–2020) (co-managed with MMO Entertainment)
- Kim Feel
- Hoons (co-managed with FRON+DESK)
- Heize (2017–2020) (co-managed with Studio Blu)
- Son Ho-young
- Iz*One (2018–2021) (co-managed with Swing Entertainment)
- SG Wannabe
- Eric Nam
- Ash-B
- TSUN
- Nieah
- MAMAN
- Yoon Ji-sung (2019–2022)
- Truedy (2018–2021)
- Soovi (2019)
- $ammy (2019–2021)
- Song Su-woo (2021–2022)

=== Actors ===
- Lee Beom-soo
- Song Seung-heon
- Kim Min-jae

=== Subsidiaries ===
- Core Contents Media (acquired by MBK Co., Ltd. as MBK Entertainment)
- Maroo Entertainment

== Controversy ==
=== Price manipulation ===
CJ E&M Music (then Mnet Media) was one of the 15 companies fined and sued by the Korean FTC for price rigging in 2011.
