= List of Music Bank Chart winners (2022) =

Music Bank Chart winners (2022)

Highlights
- Song with most wins: "After Like" by Ive (4)
- Artist(s) with most wins: Ive (9)
- Song with highest score: "Hot" by Seventeen (13,816)

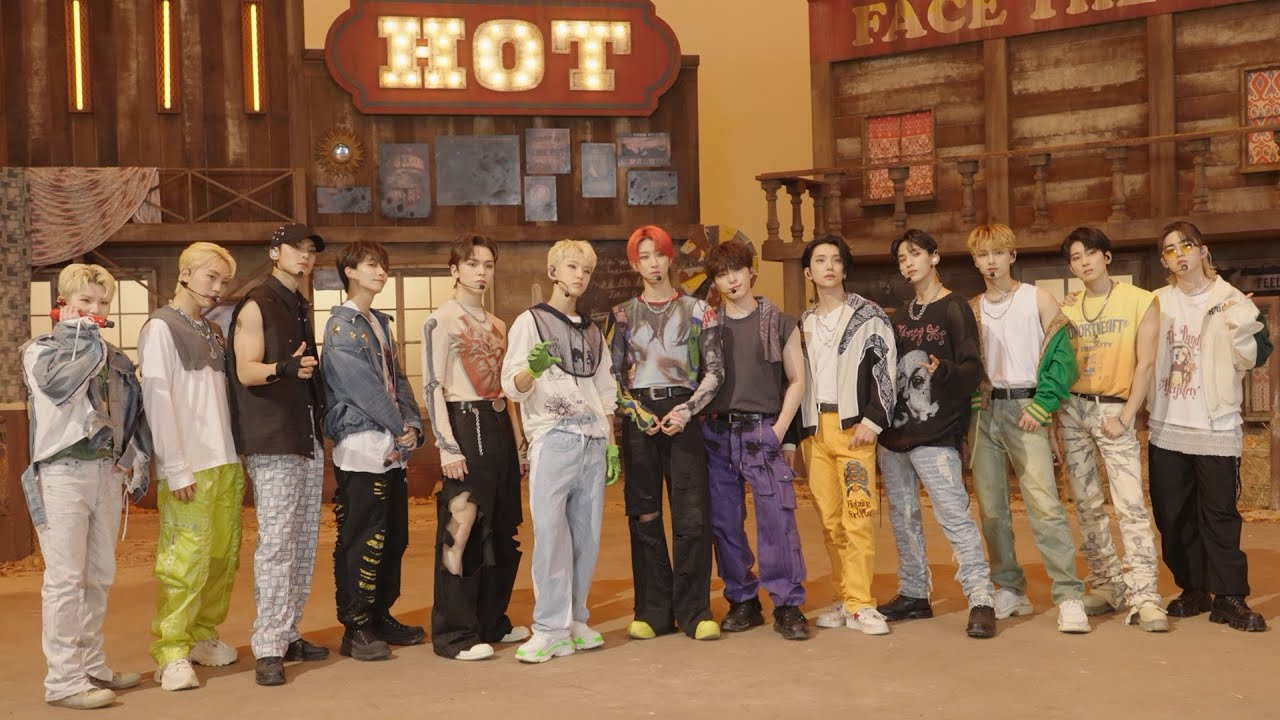
Seventeen's (pictured) win for "Hot" had the highest score of 2022, with 13,816 points at the June 3 broadcast.

The Music Bank Chart is a record chart established in 1998 on the South Korean KBS television music program Music Bank. Every week during its live broadcast, the show gives an award for the best-performing single on the South Korean chart. The chart includes digital performances on domestic online music services (65%), album sales (5%), number of times the single was broadcast on KBS TV (20%), and viewers' choice from online surveys (10%), a methodology that has been used since November 2020. On February 25, 2022, KBS changed the methodology to include social media score (5%), calculated using YouTube and TikTok data gathered from the Gaon (Note: Gaon was rebranded as Circle Chart on July 7, 2022.) charts. They also reduced the percentage from domestic online music services to 60%. The score for domestic online music services is calculated using data from Melon, Bugs, Genie Music, Naver Vibe and Flo. Ive member Jang Won-young and Enhypen member Park Sung-hoon, had been hosting the show since October 8, 2021. Sung-hoon continued to host the show till September 2, 2022. He was later replaced by actor Lee Chae-min starting September 30.

In 2022, 41 singles achieved number one on the chart, and 31 acts were awarded first-place trophies. "Hot" by Seventeen had the highest score of the year, with 13,816 points on the June 3 broadcast. Ive's "After Like" won four trophies, making it the most-awarded song of the year. Ive had three number one singles on the chart in 2022 achieved with "Eleven", "Love Dive" and "After Like". The three songs spent a total of nine weeks atop the chart, making Ive the act with the most wins of the year. Boy group NCT Dream also had three number-one singles on the chart achieved with "Glitch Mode", "Beatbox" and "Candy". In addition to Ive and NCT Dream, six other acts had more than one single rank number one on the chart in 2022. Girl groups Itzy, Kep1er and Le Sserafim had two number one singles on the chart achieved with "Sneakers" and "Cheshire", "Wa Da Da" and "Up!", and "Fearless" and "Antifragile", respectively. The latter group's win with "Fearless" on the May 13 broadcast marked their first number one on the chart. Three boy groups ranked two singles at number one on the chart in 2022. Enhypen with "Blessed-Cursed" and "Future Perfect (Pass the MIC)", Seventeen with "Hot" and "_World", and Stray Kids with "Maniac" and "Case 143".

Besides Le Sserafim, six other acts achieved their first number one on Music Bank in 2022. "♡Ticon" helped girl group CSR gain their first ever music show award on the December 2 broadcast. Pentagon achieved their first number one on the chart with "Feelin' Like". STAYC and Ateez gained their first number ones on the chart with "Run2U" and "Guerrilla", respectively. Both singles spent two weeks atop the chart. Girl group Fromis 9 won their first ever Music Bank award with "Stay This Way" in July. The last first-time winner on the chart was Oneus on September 16. They achieved this feat with their single "Same Scent".

== Chart history ==
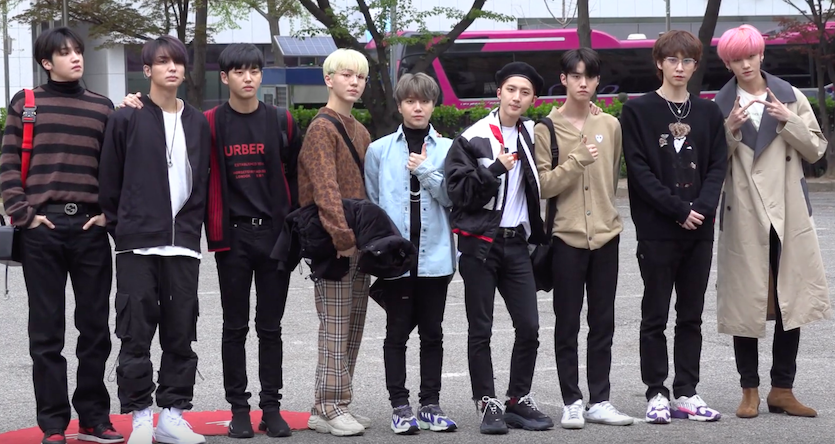
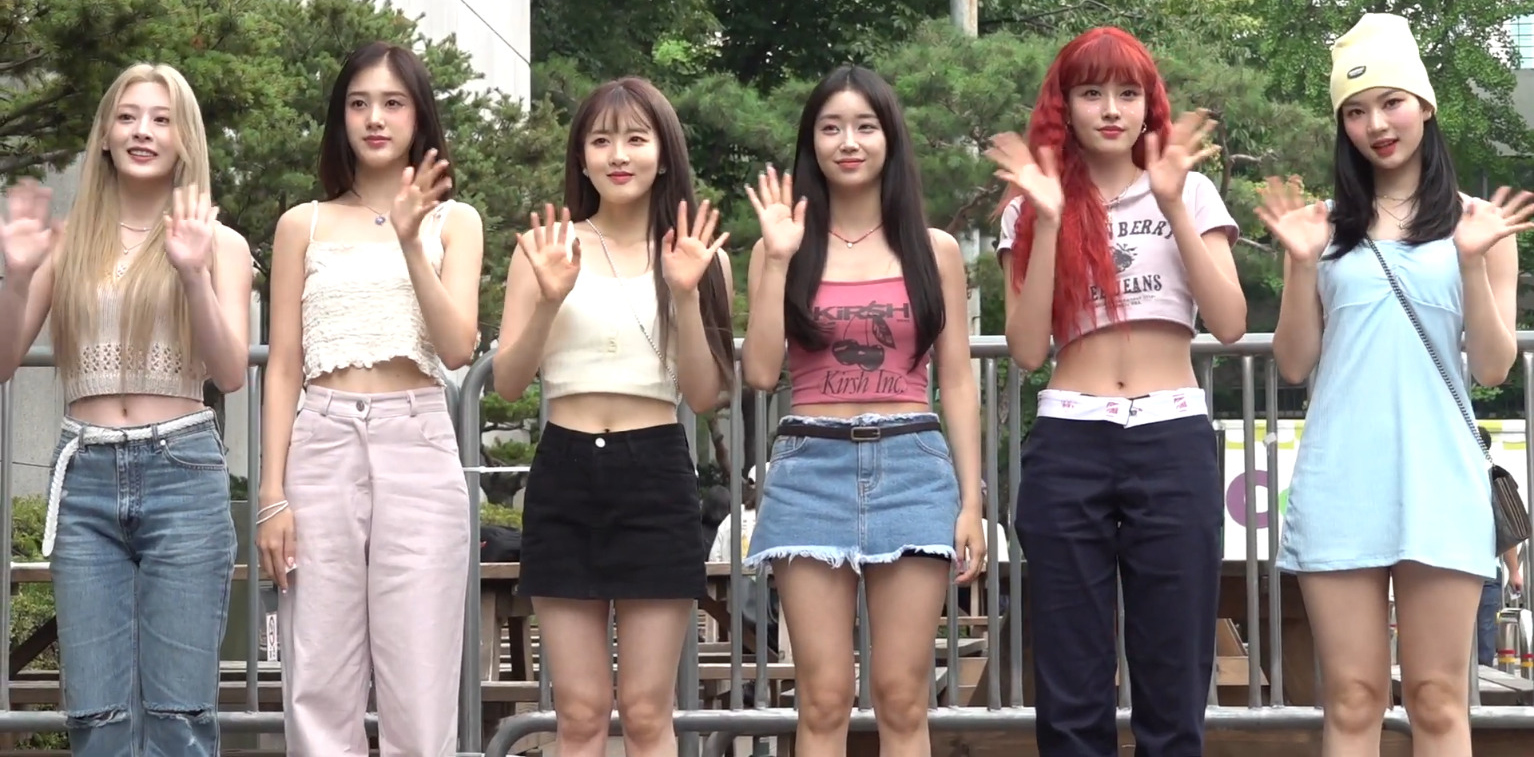
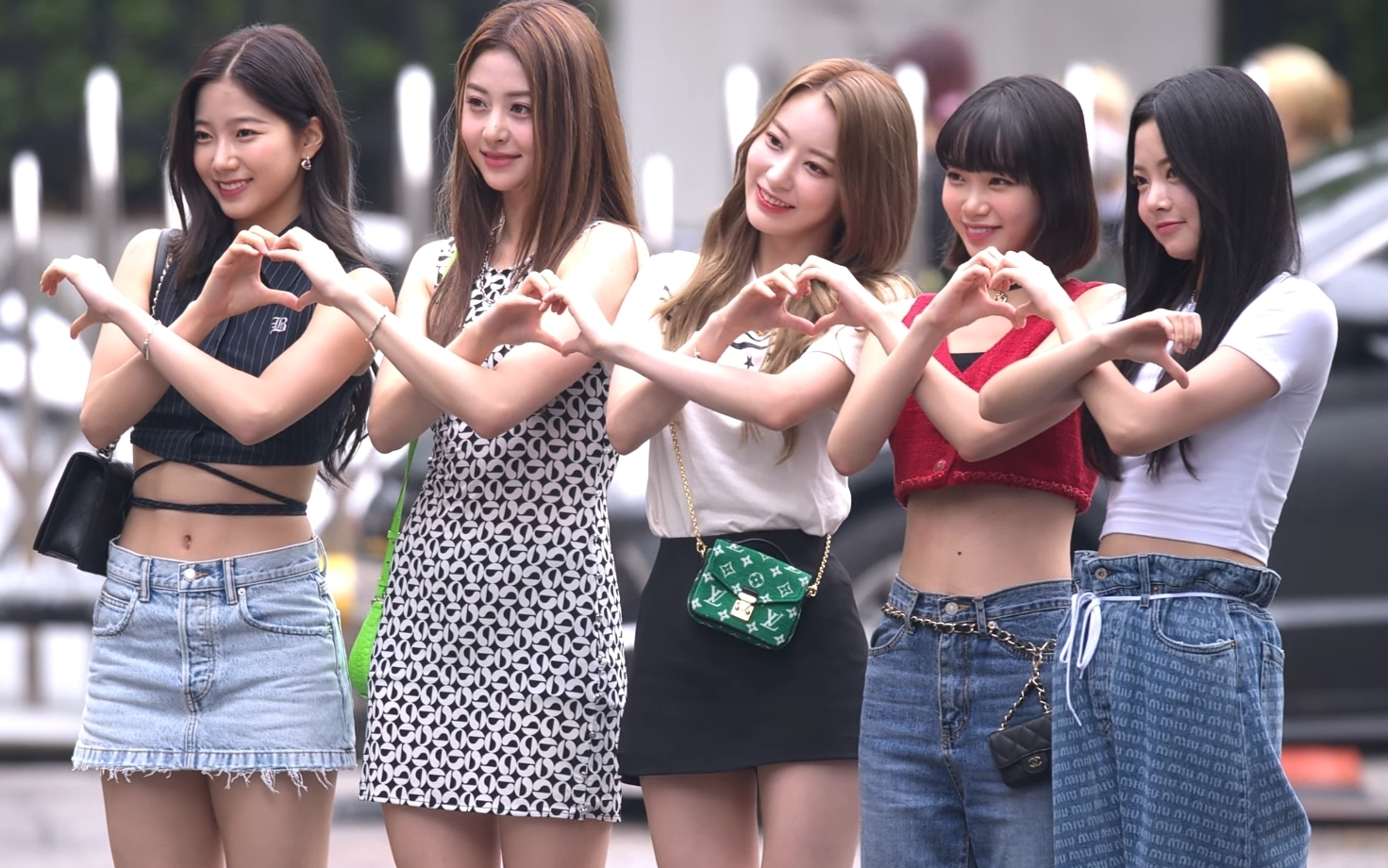
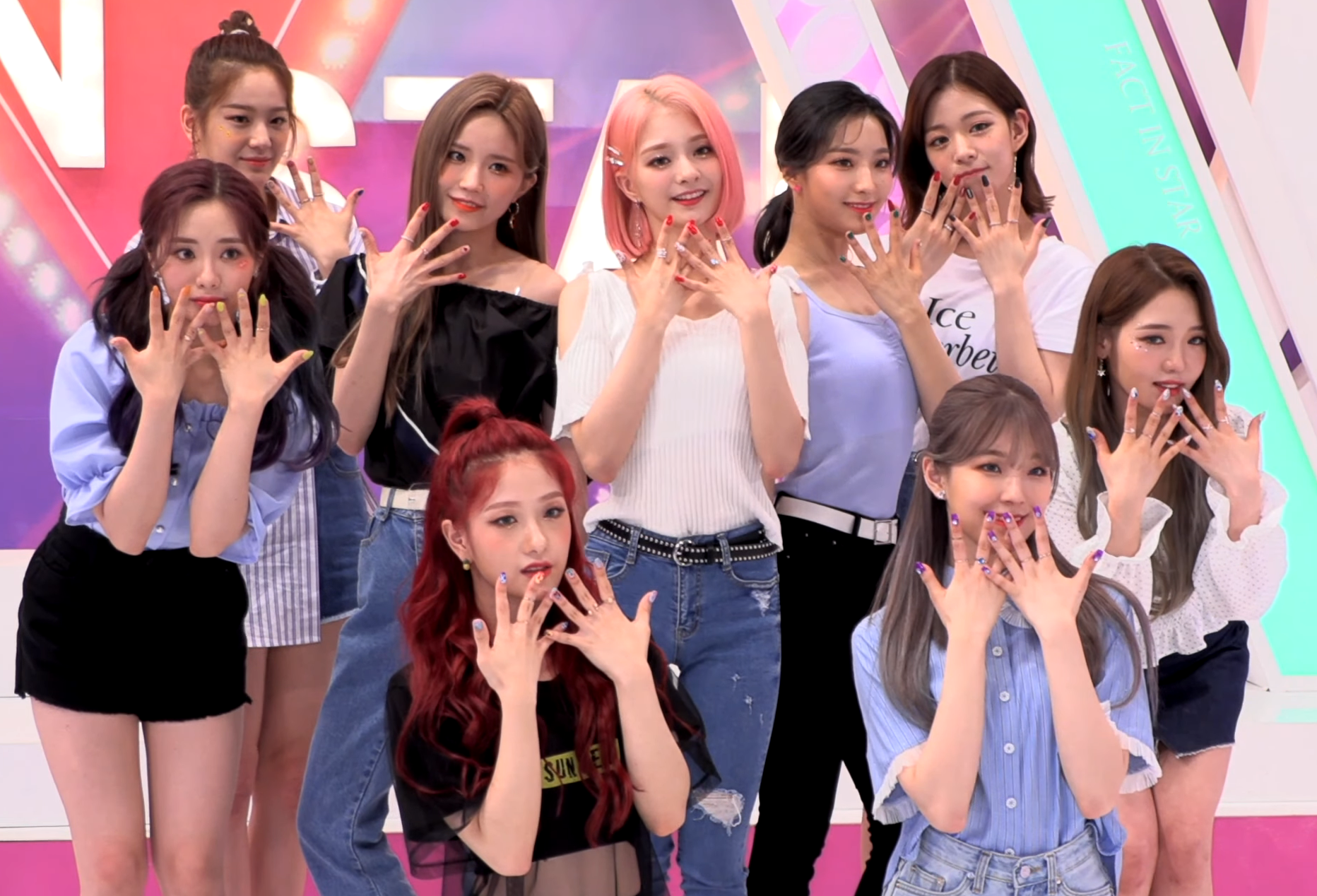
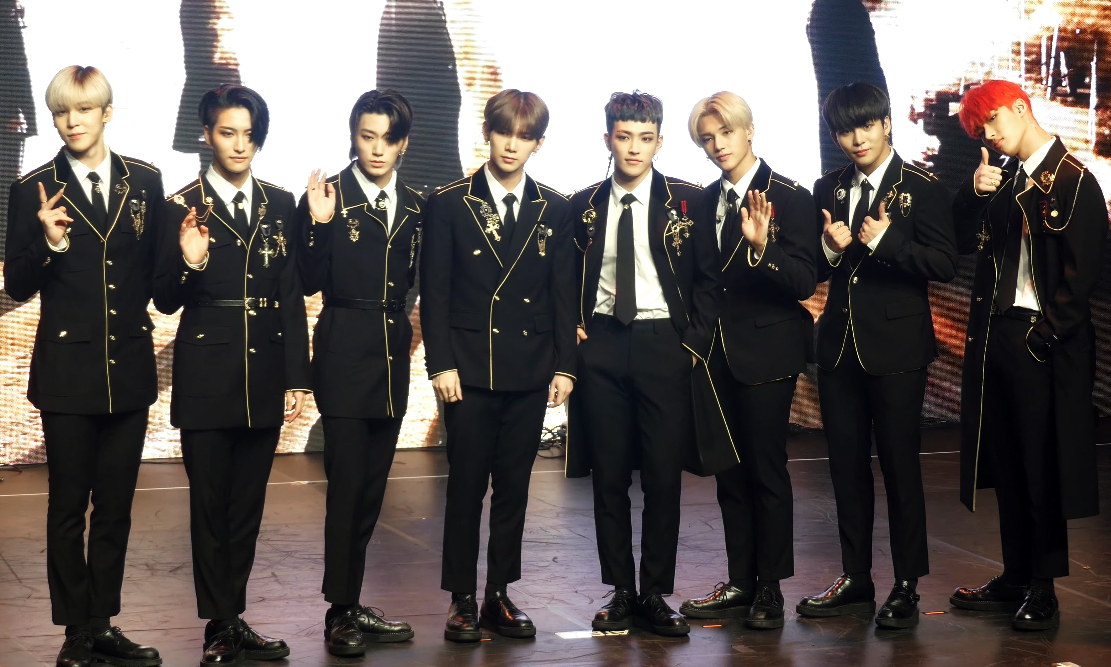
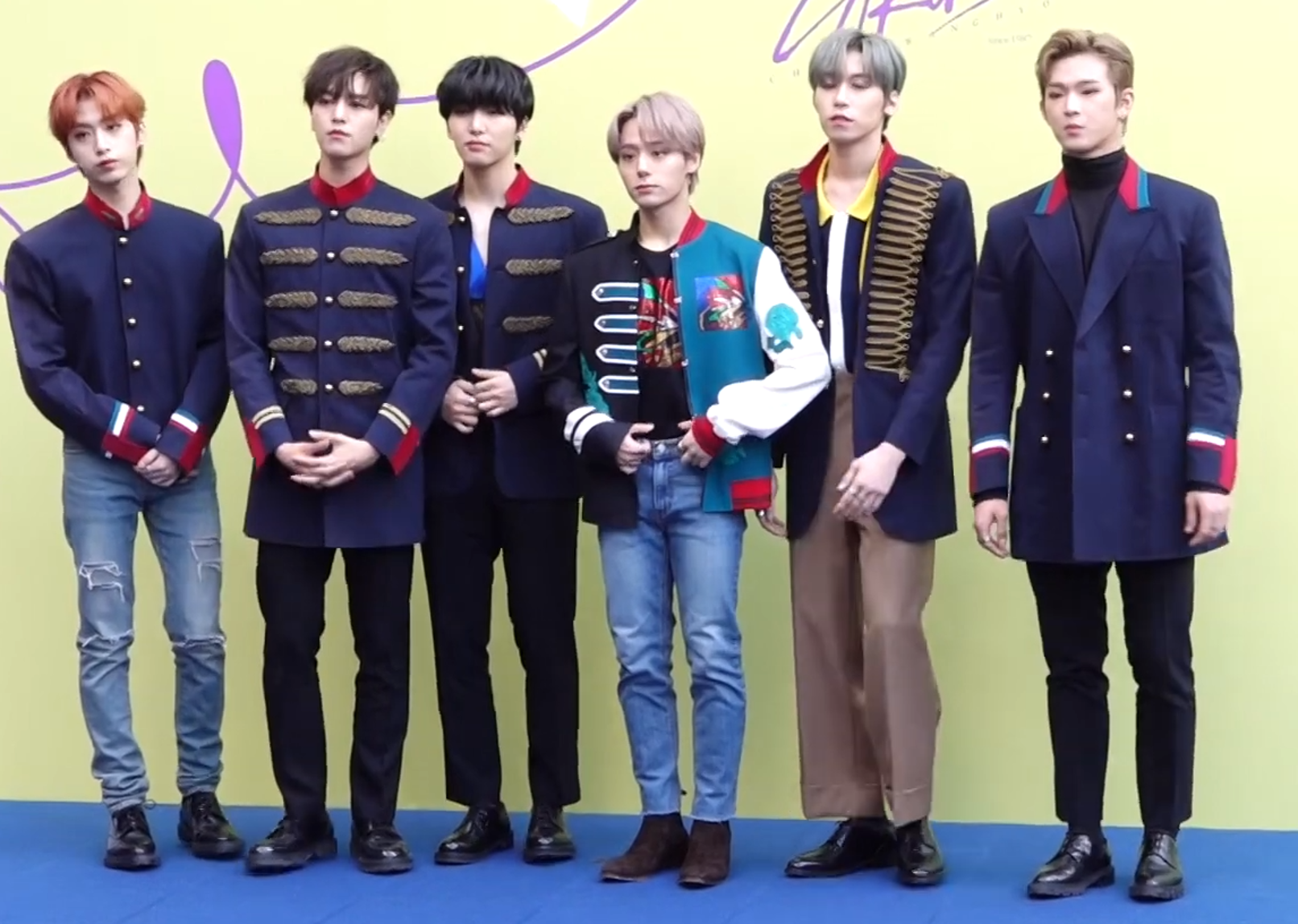
Pentagon, STAYC, Le Sserafim, Fromis 9, Ateez, and Oneus (from top to bottom) received their first major broadcast music show wins with their Music Bank trophies for "Feelin' Like", "Run2U", "Fearless", "Stay This Way", "Guerrilla", and "Same Scent" respectively.

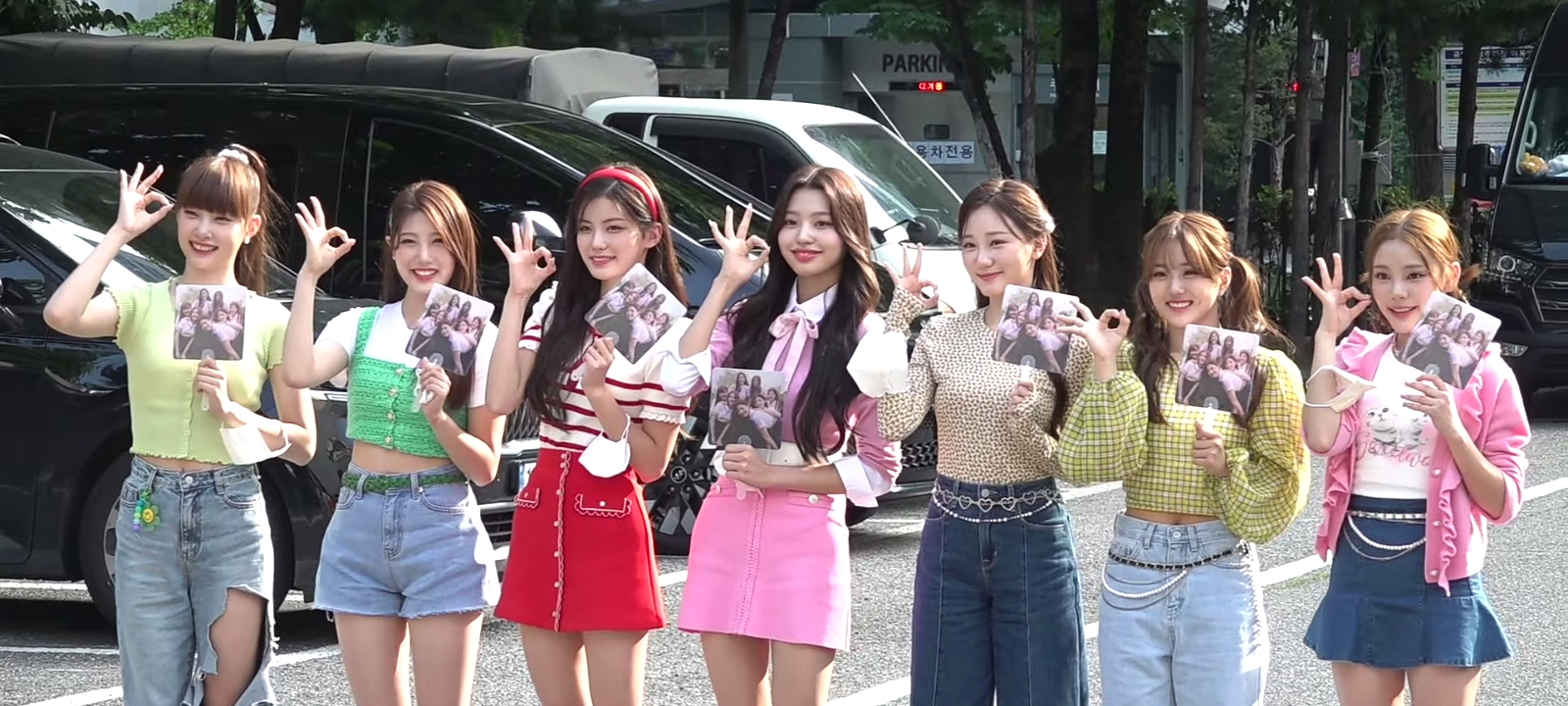
CSR (pictured) won their first ever music show trophy with "♡Ticon" in Music Bank.

Key
‡	Highest score in 2022
—	No show was broadcast

Chart history
Episode	Date	Artist	Song	Points	Ref.
1,102	January 7	NCT U	"Universe"	5,930	
1,103	January 14	Kep1er	"Wa Da Da"	3,678	
1,104	January 21	Enhypen	"Blessed-Cursed"	8,377	
1,105	January 28	IU	"Winter Sleep"	2,949	
1,106	February 4	Pentagon	"Feelin' Like"	3,426	
— (Note: This week's winners were announced on the station's official website.)	February 11	Ive	"Eleven"	3,058	
—	February 18	Ive	"Eleven"	2,566	
1,107	February 25	Treasure	"Jikjin"	4,520	
1,108	March 4	STAYC	"Run2U"	6,821	
1,109	March 11	STAYC	"Run2U"	4,719	
1,110	March 18	Kim Woo Seok	"Switch"	6,016	
1,111	March 25	Stray Kids	"Maniac"	10,596	
1,112	April 1	Red Velvet	"Feel My Rhythm"	8,416	
1,113	April 8	NCT Dream	"Glitch Mode"	10,718	
1,114	April 15	Ive	"Love Dive"	12,095	
1,115	April 22	Ive	"Love Dive"	7,324	
1,116	April 29	Ive	"Love Dive"	6,959	
1,117	May 6	Monsta X	"Love"	8,499	
1,118	May 13	Le Sserafim	"Fearless"	7,881	
1,119	May 20	TXT	"Good Boy Gone Bad"	12,610	
1,120	May 27	Astro	"Candy Sugar Pop"	6,561	
1,121	June 3	Seventeen	"Hot"	13,816 ‡	
1,122	June 10	NCT Dream	"Beatbox"	11,069	
1,123	June 17	BTS	"Yet to Come"	6,692	
1,124	June 24	BTS	"Yet to Come"	5,573	
1,125	July 1	Kep1er	"Up!"	7,268	
1,126	July 8	Fromis 9	"Stay This Way"	8,378	
1,127	July 15	Enhypen	"Future Perfect (Pass the MIC)"	8,577	
1,128	July 22	Itzy	"Sneakers"	10,427	
1,129	July 29	Seventeen	"_World"	10,353	
1,130	August 5	Ateez	"Guerrilla"	8,474	
1,131	August 12	Ateez	"Guerrilla"	6,169	
1,132	August 19	NewJeans	"Attention"	11,150	
1,133	August 26	The Boyz	"Whisper"	11,097	
1,134	September 2	Ive	"After Like"	12,174	
—	September 9	Ive	"After Like"	11,406	
1,135	September 16	Oneus	"Same Scent"	8,115	
1,136	September 23	Ive	"After Like"	7,502	
1,137	September 30	NCT 127	"2 Baddies"	9,309	
1,138	October 7	Ive	"After Like"	6,966	
1,139	October 14	Stray Kids	"Case 143"	11,168	
1,140	October 21	Stray Kids	"Case 143"	8,113	
1,141	October 28	(G)I-dle	"Nxde"	12,541	
— (Note: This week's episode was cancelled due to the period of national mourning after the Seoul Halloween crowd crush.)	November 4	Le Sserafim	"Antifragile"	8,786	
—	November 11	Le Sserafim	"Antifragile"	6,137	
1,142	November 18	Highlight	"Alone"	7,618	
1,143	November 25	Verivery	"Tap Tap"	6,069	
1,144	December 2	CSR	"♡Ticon"	6,407	
1,145	December 9	Itzy	"Cheshire"	8,462	
—	December 16	Kara	"When I Move"	5,618	
—	December 23	Younha	"Event Horizon"	4,233	
—	December 30	NCT Dream	"Candy"	10,528	

== See also ==
- List of Inkigayo Chart winners (2022)
- List of M Countdown Chart winners (2022)
- List of Show Champion Chart winners (2022)
- List of Show! Music Core Chart winners (2022)
- List of The Show Chart winners (2022)
