= Fearless (Le Sserafim song) =

- Japanese version digital cover

Single by Le Sserafim

from the EP Fearless
- Language: Korean; Japanese
- Released: May 2, 2022
- Genre: Alternative pop; dance-pop; funk
- Length: 2:48
- Label: Source; YG Plus; EMI; Universal Japan
- Songwriters: Score (13); Megatone (13); Supreme Boi; Blvsh; Jaro; Nikolay Mohr; "Hitman" Bang; Oneye; Josefin Glenmark; Emmy Kasai; Kyler Niko; Pau; Destiny Rogers
- Producer: 13

Le Sserafim singles chronology
"Fearless" (2022)	"Antifragile" (2022)

Music video
- "Fearless" on YouTube

Le Sserafim Japanese singles chronology
"Fearless" (Japanese version) (2023)	"Unforgiven" (Japanese version) (2023)

Music video
- "Fearless (Japanese ver.)" on YouTube

"Fearless" is the debut single recorded by South Korean girl group Le Sserafim for their debut extended play (EP) of the same name. It was released as the EP's lead single by Source Music on May 2, 2022. The Japanese version was released digitally on December 15, 2022, and physically on January 25, 2023, as the group's Japanese debut single by EMI Records and Universal Music Japan.

The song was commercially successful and peaked within the top ten in Japan, Malaysia, Singapore, and South Korea, while the Japanese version topped the Billboard Japan Hot 100 and Oricon Singles Chart. It has been certified platinum for streaming in Japan and South Korea, and double platinum for physical sales in Japan.

== Background and release ==
On March 14, 2022, Source Music announced it would be debuting a new girl group in collaboration with Hybe Corporation. One week later, Hybe Corporation announced the group would be debuting in May. On April 13, it was announced the group would be releasing their debut extended play Fearless on May 2. On April 25, the track listing was released, with "Fearless" announced as the lead single, followed by a highlight medley video two days later. Music video teasers for "Fearless" were released on April 29 and May 1, respectively. The release of the Japanese version of the song was announced on November 25 as part of Le Sserafim's Japanese debut on January 25, 2023.

== Composition ==
"Fearless" was written and composed by Score (13), Megatone (13), Supreme Boi, Blvsh, Jaro, Nikolay Mohr, "Hitman" Bang, Oneye, Josefin Glenmark, Emmy Kasai, Kyler Niko, Pau, and Destiny Rogers. Musically, the song was described as funk-based alternative pop and dance-pop song with lyrics that "tells the story of moving forward without being shaken by the past". "Fearless" was composed in the key of A minor, with a tempo of 104 beats per minute.

== Commercial performance ==
"Fearless" debuted at number 85 on South Korea's Gaon Digital Chart in the chart issue dated May 1–7, 2022. It rose to number 12 in the chart issue dated May 22–28, 2022. On the Billboard South Korea Songs chart, "Fearless" debuted at number 11 in the chart issue dated May 14, 2022, ascending to number four in the chart issue dated May 28, 2022.

In New Zealand, the song debuted at number 27 on the RMNZ Hot Singles in the chart issue dated May 9, 2022. In Japan, the song debuted at number nine on the Billboard Japan Hot 100 in the chart issue dated May 11, 2022. On the Oricon Combined Singles Chart, the song debuted at number 13 in the chart issue dated May 16, 2022.

In Singapore, "Fearless" debuted at number eight on the RIAS Top Streaming Chart in the chart issue dated May 6–12, 2022, peaking at number seven the following week. The song also debuted at number 13 on the RIAS Top Regional Chart in the chart issue dated April 29 – May 5, 2022, ascending to number four in the following week. On the Billboard Singapore Songs chart, "Fearless" debuted at 11 in the chart issue dated May 21, 2022. In Malaysia, the song debuted at number 12 on the Billboard Malaysia Songs chart in the chart issue dated May 21, 2022. It also peaked at number eight on the RIM International Singles Streaming Chart in the chart issue dated May 13–19, 2022. In Taiwan, the song debuted at number 14 on the Billboard Taiwan Songs chart in the chart issue dated May 21, 2022. In Indonesia, "Fearless" debuted at number 20 on the Billboard Indonesia Songs chart in the chart issue dated May 21, 2022, ascending to number 19 in the following week. On the Billboard Vietnam Hot 100, the song debuted at number 65 in the chart issue dated May 12, 2022, ascending to number 36 in the following week.

In United States, "Fearless" debuted at number 14 on the Billboard World Digital Song Sales chart in the chart issue dated May 14, 2022, ascending to number 12 the following week. The song debuted at number 155 on the Billboard Global 200 and number 74 on the Billboard Global Excl. U.S. in the chart issue dated May 14, 2022. It ascended to number 69 on the Billboard Global 200 and number 48 on the Billboard Global Excl. U.S. the following week.

The Japanese version of "Fearless" debuted atop of the daily ranking of the Oricon Singles Chart on its first day, selling 132,621 physical copies. It finished at number one on the weekly Oricon Singles Chart with 222,286 units sold, while Billboard Japan recorded 321,717 sales from January 23–29, 2023. The single was later certified double platinum by the Recording Industry Association of Japan (RIAJ) for selling over 500,000 units.

== Promotion ==
Following the release of Fearless, Le Sserafim held a live showcase on the same date to introduce the extended play and communicate with fans. The group performed "Fearless" and "Blue Flame" during the showcase. They subsequently performed on three music programs: Mnet's M Countdown on May 5, and KBS's Music Bank on May 6, and SBS's Inkigayo on May 8. In the second week, they performed on five music programs: SBS MTV's The Show on May 10, MBC M's Show Champion on May 11, Mnet's M Countdown on May 12, KBS's Music Bank on May 13, and SBS's Inkigayo on May 15, where they won first place for their appearance on The Show and Music Bank. In the third week, Le Sserafim performed on The Show on May 17, where they won first place. In the fifth week, they performed on Show Champion on June 1, where they won first place.

The Japanese version of "Fearless" was performed on the 73rd NHK Kōhaku Uta Gassen music program on New Year's Eve in 2022.

== Accolades ==
Awards and nominations for "Fearless"
Year	Ceremony	Award	Result	Ref.
2023	Circle Chart Music Awards	Artist of the Year – Global Digital Music (May)	Won	
2023	Circle Chart Music Awards	New Artist of the Year – Digital	Nominated	
2023	Golden Disc Awards	Best Digital Song (Bonsang)	Nominated	
2022	MAMA Awards	Best Dance Performance Female Group	Nominated	
2022	MAMA Awards	Song of the Year	Nominated	

Music program awards
Program	Date	Ref.
Music Bank	May 13, 2022	
Show Champion	June 1, 2022	
The Show	May 10, 2022	
The Show	May 17, 2022	

=== Music Bank controversy ===
Le Sserafim's win on the May 13 broadcast of KBS' Music Bank was met with controversy after allegations of score manipulation surfaced. According to Segye Ilbo, the program received complaints regarding fellow first place nominee Lim Young-woong's score of zero in the broadcast category. The program initially claimed that his song "If We Ever Meet Again" was not played on any of their digital content, therefore accumulating zero points in the category; however, it was pointed out that it was in fact played on several KBS radio stations. On August 24, producers of the show were charged for manipulating scores. On February 10, 2023, police investigation concluded that KBS were not guilty and that Le Sserafim rightfully won their first-place trophy on Music Bank during the May 13, 2022, broadcast.

== Track listing ==
- CD single / digital download / streaming (Japanese version)
1. "Fearless" (Japanese version) – 2:48
2. "Blue Flame" (Japanese version) – 3:21
3. "Choices" – 3:21
- DVD (Japanese version – limited B)
1. "Fearless" (Japanese version) (music video) – 2:54
2. "Fearless" (Japanese version) (MV & jacket shoot sketch)

== Charts ==
=== Weekly charts ===
Weekly chart performance for "Fearless"
Chart (2022–2023)	Peak position
Global 200 (Billboard)	69
Indonesia (Billboard)	19
Japan (Japan Hot 100)	9
Japan Combined Singles (Oricon)	13
Malaysia (Billboard)	12
Malaysia International (RIM)	8
New Zealand Hot Singles (RMNZ)	27
Singapore (RIAS)	7
South Korea (Gaon)	9
South Korea (Circle) 2023 version	181
Taiwan (Billboard)	14
US World Digital Song Sales (Billboard)	12
Vietnam (Vietnam Hot 100)	36

Weekly chart performance for "Fearless" Japanese version
Chart (2023)	Peak position
Japan Hot 100 (Billboard)	1
Japan (Oricon)	1
Japan Combined Singles (Oricon)	1
UK Physical Singles (OCC)	3
UK Singles Sales (OCC)	94

=== Monthly charts ===
Monthly chart performance for "Fearless"
Chart (2022–23)	Position
Japan (Oricon) Japanese version	1
South Korea (Circle)	10

=== Year-end charts ===
2022 year-end chart performance for "Fearless"
Chart (2022)	Position
Global Excl. US (Billboard)	191
Japan Streaming Songs (Billboard Japan)	93
South Korea (Circle)	29

2023 year-end chart performance for "Fearless"
Chart (2023)	Position
Japan (Oricon)	29
Japan Top Singles Sales (Billboard Japan)	22
South Korea (Circle)	53

== Certifications ==
Certifications for "Fearless"
Region	Certification	Certified units/sales
Japan (RIAJ) Japanese version	2× Platinum	500,000^{^}
Streaming
Japan (RIAJ)	Platinum	100,000,000^{†}
South Korea (KMCA)	Platinum	100,000,000^{†}
^{^} Shipments figures based on certification alone.^{†} Streaming-only figures based on certification alone.

== Release history ==
Release history for "Fearless"
Region	Date	Format	Version	Label
Various	May 2, 2022	Digital download; streaming	Korean	Source Music; YG Plus
Various	December 15, 2022	Digital download; streaming	Japanese	EMI; Source Music; Universal Japan
Japan	January 25, 2023	CD Single	Japanese	EMI; Source Music; Universal Japan
Japan	January 25, 2023	CD + DVD	Japanese	EMI; Source Music; Universal Japan

== See also ==
- List of Music Bank Chart winners (2022)
- List of Show Champion Chart winners (2022)
- List of The Show Chart winners (2022)
