= Stay This Way =

Single by Fromis 9

from the EP From Our Memento Box
- Language: Korean
- Released: June 27, 2022
- Recorded: May 10, 2022
- Length: 3:15
- Label: Pledis; YG Plus
- Composers: Justin Reinstein; Lee Woo-min "collapsedone"; Anna Timgren
- Lyricist: Seo Ji-eum

Fromis 9 singles chronology
"DM" (2022)	"Stay This Way" (2022)	"#menow" (2023)

Music video
- "Stay This Way" on YouTube

"Stay This Way" is a song recorded by South Korean girl group Fromis 9 for their fifth extended play From Our Memento Box. It was released as the EP's lead single by Pledis Entertainment on June 27, 2022.

== Background and release ==
On June 6, 2022, Pledis Entertainment announced Fromis 9 would be releasing their fifth extended play titled From Our Memento Box, it was also announced that member Baek Ji-heon would be returning from her hiatus. On June 9, the track listing was released with "Stay This Way" announced as the lead single. On June 21, the highlight medley teaser video was released. Four days later, the music video teaser was released.

== Composition ==
"Stay This Way" was written by Seo Ji-eum, composed and arranged by Justin Reinstein and Lee Woo-min "collapsedone" alongside Anna Timgren for the composition. The song was described a funk bass song with lyrics about "going on an impromptu trip at sunset". "Stay This Way" was composed in the key of B major, with a tempo of 124 beats per minute.

== Commercial performance ==
"Stay This Way" debuted at number 14 on South Korea's Circle Digital Chart in the chart issue dated June 26 – July 2, 2022.

== Promotion ==
On June 26, 2022, Pledis Entertainment announced the showcase for From Our Memento Box scheduled for June 27 would be cancelled after members Song Ha-young, Park Ji-won, Lee Seo-yeon, Lee Chae-young, and Baek Ji-heon got into a car accident. During the first week of promotions, the group performed on three music programs: Mnet's M Countdown on June 30, KBS2's Music Bank on July 1, and SBS's Inkigayo on July 3. In the second week, they performed on four music programs: SBS M's The Show on July 5, MBC M's Show Champion on July 6, M Countdown on July 7, and Music Bank on July 8, where they won first place for all four appearances.

== Charts ==
=== Weekly charts ===
Weekly chart performance for "Stay This Way"
Chart (2022)	Peak position
South Korea (Billboard)	12
South Korea (Circle)	14

=== Monthly charts ===
Monthly chart performance for "Stay This Way"
Chart (2022)	Peak position
South Korea (Circle)	85

== Accolades ==
Music program awards for "Stay This Way"
Program	Date	Ref.
M Countdown	July 7, 2022	
Music Bank	July 8, 2022	
Show Champion	July 6, 2022	
Show! Music Core	July 9, 2022	
The Show	July 5, 2022	

== Release history ==
Release history for "Stay This Way"
Region	Date	Format	Label
Various	June 27, 2022	Digital download; streaming	Pledis; YG Plus

== See also ==
- List of M Countdown Chart winners (2022)
- List of Music Bank Chart winners (2022)
- List of Show Champion Chart winners (2022)
- List of Show! Music Core Chart winners (2022)
- List of The Show Chart winners (2022)
