= From Our Memento Box =

- Digital and "Dream" version cover

EP by Fromis 9
- Released: June 27, 2022
- Length: 15:41
- Language: Korean
- Label: Pledis; YG Plus

Fromis 9 chronology
| Midnight Guest (2022) | From Our Memento Box (2022) | Unlock My World (2023) |

Singles from From Our Memento Box
- 1. "Stay This Way" Released: June 27, 2022

From Our Memento Box is the fifth extended play by South Korean girl group Fromis 9. The EP was released by Pledis Entertainment on June 27, 2022, and contains five tracks, including the lead single "Stay This Way". This is the final EP to feature member Jang Gyu-ri, who left the group on July 28, 2022.

== Background and release ==
On June 6, 2022, Pledis Entertainment announced Fromis 9 would be releasing their fifth extended play titled From Our Memento Box, it was also announced that member Baek Ji-heon would be returning from her hiatus. A day later, the promotional schedule was released, followed by the release of the concept teaser video on June 8. On June 9, the track listing was released with "Stay This Way" announced as the lead single. On June 21, the highlight medley teaser video was released. Four days later, the music video teaser for "Stay This Way" was released.

== Music ==
The album's opener, "Up And", is described as having "synth that express the refreshing sound with 2-step garage-based drums", with writing contributions from member, Baek Jiheon. The title track, "Stay This Way" has an "exciting, addictive chorus" with a "bridge that lets you feel a danceable pop sensibility". The third track, "Blind Letter", is a pop song that "mixes trap beats with a sense of indie rock". The fourth track, "Cheese", is a pop, dance genre song based on "house rhythm with bass riffs on top of an addictive chorus". The album's closer, "Rewind", is a song based on Deep House and Future House, with dreamy synths and basslines.

== Commercial performance ==
From Our Memento Box debuted at number one on South Korea's Circle Album Chart in the chart issue dated June 26 – July 2, 2022; on the monthly chart, the EP debuted at number five in the chart issue for June 2022 with overall of 165,937 copies sold. In Japan, the EP debuted at number 75 on the Billboard Japan Hot Albums in the chart issue dated July 6, 2022; on its component chart, the EP debuted at number 16 on Top Download Albums.

== Promotion ==
On June 26, 2022, Pledis Entertainment announced the showcase for From Our Memento Box scheduled for June 27 would be cancelled after members Song Ha-young, Park Ji-won, Lee Seo-yeon, Lee Chae-young, and Baek Ji-heon got into a car accident.

== Track listing ==
Track listing for From Our Memento Box
| No. | Title | Lyrics | Music | Length |
|---|---|---|---|---|
| 1. | "Up And" | Baek Ji-heon; Stella Jones (153/Joombas) | Stella Jones (153/Joombas); Xox (153/Joombas) (Note: Also credited with arrangement.) | 3:12 |
| 2. | "Stay This Way" | Seo Ji-eum | Justin Reinstein; Lee Woo-min "collapsedone"; Anna Timgren | 3:15 |
| 3. | "Blind Letter" | Lee Seu-ran | Slow Rabbit; Adora; Daniel Caesar; Ludwig Lindell; Melanie Fontana; Lindgren | 2:40 |
| 4. | "Cheese" | Danke (Lalala Studio) | C'SA; Hongsamman; Hee Chang (Coke Paris) | 3:01 |
| 5. | "Rewind" | Wkly; C'SA | C'SA; Sweetch; Niko | 3:33 |
| Total length: | | | | 15:41 |

== Charts ==
=== Weekly charts ===
Weekly chart performance for From Our Memento Box
| Chart (2022) | Peak position |
|---|---|
| Japanese Albums (Oricon) | 6 |
| Japanese Hot Albums (Billboard Japan) | 6 |
| South Korean Albums (Circle) | 1 |

=== Monthly charts ===
Monthly chart performance for From Our Memento Box
| Chart (2022) | Peak position |
|---|---|
| Japanese Albums (Oricon) | 33 |
| South Korean Albums (Circle) | 5 |

=== Year-end chart ===
Year-end chart performance for From Our Memento Box
| Chart (2022) | Peak position |
|---|---|
| South Korea Albums (Circle) | 92 |

== Sales ==
Overall sales for From Our Memento Box
| Region | Sales |
|---|---|
| South Korea | 165,937 |

== Release history ==
Release history for From Our Memento Box
| Region | Date | Format | Label |
|---|---|---|---|
| South Korea | June 27, 2022 | CD; Kihno kit | Pledis; YG Plus |
| Various | June 27, 2022 | Digital download; streaming | Pledis; YG Plus |
