= After Like (song) =

Single by Ive

from the album After Like
- Language: Korean; English
- Released: August 22, 2022
- Genre: Pop; EDM; disco; house
- Length: 2:56
- Label: Starship; Kakao
- Composers: Ryan S. Jhun; Anders Nilsen; André Jensen; Iselin Solheim
- Lyricists: Seo Ji-eum; Mommy Son; Rei

Ive singles chronology
"Love Dive" (2022)	"After Like" (2022)	"Kitsch" (2023)

Music video
- "After Like" on YouTube

"After Like" is a song recorded by South Korean girl group Ive for their third single album of the same name. It was released as the single album's lead single by Starship Entertainment on August 22, 2022. It is a pop song that draws from EDM, disco, and house music with lyrics about "showing your love methods with actions rather than your heart".

"After Like" was a commercial success in South Korea and topped the Circle Digital Chart for four weeks, becoming Ive's second number-one single. It reached the top ten in Malaysia, Singapore, Taiwan, and Vietnam, as well as on the Billboard Global Excl. US chart. The song has been certified platinum for streaming in South Korea. Ive promoted the song with live performances on various weekly South Korean music programs, including M Countdown, Music Bank, Show! Music Core, and Inkigayo. As of December 2024, the accompanying music video for the song has reached over 300 million views on Starship Entertainment's YouTube channel.

== Background and release ==
On July 24, 2022, Starship Entertainment announced that Ive would be releasing their third single album, After Like, on August 22. On August 7, the track listing was released, with "After Like" announced as the lead single. On August 19, the music video teaser was released. On August 21, the song was partially pre-released on TikTok. The song was released alongside its music video and the single album on August 22. On November 16, the "holiday remix" version was released on Spotify as part of the Spotify Holiday Singles project.

== Composition ==
The lyrics of "After Like" were written primarily by Seo Ji-eum with Mommy Son, and Rei participating in the writing of rap lyrics. The song was composed and arranged primarily by Ryan S. Jhun and Anders Nilsen; André Jensen and Iselin Solheim also participated in composition, while Avin and Slay contributed to arrangement. Musically, "After Like" was described as a pop song that draws from EDM, disco, and house music with lyrics about "showing your love methods with actions rather than your heart". "After Like" was composed in the key of C major, with a tempo of 125 beats per minute. The instrumental break samples "Supreme" by Robbie Williams, which itself interpolates "I Will Survive" by Gloria Gaynor.

== Commercial performance ==
"After Like" debuted at number three on South Korea's Circle Digital Chart in the chart issue dated August 21–27, 2022, ascending to number one in the following week. The song became their first song to achieve a perfect all-kill (PAK). The song also debuted at number four on the Billboard South Korea Songs in the chart issue dated September 3, 2022, ascending to number two in the following week. In Japan, the song debuted at number 13 on the Billboard Japan Hot 100 in the chart issue dated August 31, 2022. On the Oricon Combined Singles Chart, the song debuted at number 11 in the chart issue dated September 5, 2022.

In Singapore, "After Like" debuted at number two on the RIAS Top Streaming Songs and Top Regional Songs in the chart issue dated August 19–25, 2022. It also debuted at number three on the Billboard Singapore Songs in the chart issue dated September 3, 2022, ascending to number two in the following week. In Malaysia, the song debuted at number 11 on the Billboard Malaysia Songs in the chart issue dated September 3, 2022, ascending to number five in the following week. In Indonesia, the song debuted at number 16 on the Billboard Indonesia Songs in the chart issue dated September 10, 2022. In Philippines, the song debuted at number 11 on the Billboard Philippines Songs in the chart issue dated September 10, 2022. In Hong Kong, the song debuted at number 14 on the Billboard Hong Kong Songs in the chart issue dated September 3, 2022. In Taiwan, the song debuted at number 15 on the Billboard Taiwan Songs in the chart issue dated September 3, 2022, ascending to number five in the following week. In Vietnam, the song debuted at number 10 on the Billboard Vietnam Hot 100 in the chart issue dated September 1, 2022, ascending to number nine in the following week.

In the United States, "After Like" debuted at number three on the Billboard World Digital Song Sales in the chart issue dated September 3, 2022. In Canada, the song debuted at number 96 on the Billboard Canadian Hot 100 in the chart issue dated September 10, 2022. In Australia, the song debuted at number 79 on the ARIA Top 100 Singles Chart in the chart issue dated September 5, 2022. In New Zealand, the song debuted at number four on the RMNZ Hot Singles in the chart issue dated August 29, 2022. Globally, the song debuted at number 48 on the Billboard Global 200, and number 27 on the Billboard Global Excl. U.S. in the chart issue dated September 3, 2022. It ascended to number nine on the Billboard Global Excl. U.S. in the following week.

== Promotion ==
Following the release of After Like, the group performed "After Like" on four music programs in the first week: Mnet's M Countdown on August 25, KBS's Music Bank on August 26, MBC's Show! Music Core on August 27, and SBS's Inkigayo on August 28. In the second week, they performed on six music programs: SBS M's The Show on August 30, MBC M's Show Champion on August 31, M Countdown on September 1, Music Bank on September 2, Show! Music Core on September 3, and Inkigayo on September 4, where they won first place for all appearances except M Countdown and Inkigayo. In the third week, the group performed on three music programs: The Show on September 6, Show Champion on September 7, M Countdown on September 8, where they won first place for all appearances except M Countdown.

== Music video ==
The music video was released alongside the song itself by Starship Entertainment on August 22, 2022. Within an hour of release, the view count surpassed two million, and 16 million within 16 hours of its release. On September 26, 2022, the music video surpassed 100 million views on YouTube. As of January 2024, the music video has reached 250 million views, is the most watched music video of Ive, and is the most watched video on Starship Entertainment's YouTube channel.

== Accolades ==
"After Like" won 14 first place music program awards. It also won a Melon Weekly Popularity Award for the week of September 2, 2022.

Year-end lists for "After Like"
Publisher	Listicle	Rank	Ref.
Billboard	The 25 Best K-Pop Songs of 2022	21	
Rolling Stone	The 100 Best Songs of 2022	53	
Teen Vogue	The 79 Best K-Pop Songs of 2022	Placed	
YouTube Korea	Top 10 Most Popular Music Video in 2022	7	

Music program awards
Program	Date	Ref.
Inkigayo	October 23, 2022	
M Countdown	September 15, 2022	
Music Bank	September 2, 2022	
Music Bank	September 9, 2022	
Music Bank	September 23, 2022	
Music Bank	October 7, 2022	
Show Champion	August 31, 2022	
Show Champion	September 7, 2022	
Show! Music Core	September 3, 2022	
Show! Music Core	September 17, 2022	
Show! Music Core	September 24, 2022	
Show! Music Core	October 22, 2022	
The Show	August 30, 2022	
The Show	September 6, 2022	

== Credits and personnel ==
Credits adapted from Melon.

- Ive – vocals
  - Rei – lyrics (rap)
- Seo Ji-eum – lyrics
- Mommy Son – lyrics (rap)
- Ryan S. Jhun – composition, arrangement
- Anders Nilsen – composition, arrangement
- André Jensen – composition
- Iselin Solheim – composition
- Avin – arrangement
- Slay – arrangement

== Charts ==
=== Weekly charts ===
Weekly chart performance for "After Like"
Chart (2022)	Peak position
Argentina (Argentina Hot 100)	47
Australia (ARIA)	79
Canada (Canadian Hot 100)	96
Global 200 (Billboard)	20
Hong Kong (Billboard)	14
Hungary (Single Top 40)	13
Indonesia (Billboard)	16
Japan (Japan Hot 100)	13
Japan Combined Singles (Oricon)	11
Malaysia (Billboard)	5
Netherlands (Global 40)	29
New Zealand Hot Singles (RMNZ)	4
Philippines (Billboard)	11
Singapore (Billboard)	2
Singapore (RIAS)	2
South Korea (Circle)	1
Taiwan (Billboard)	5
UK Indie Breakers (OCC)	17
US World Digital Song Sales (Billboard)	3
Vietnam (Vietnam Hot 100)	9

=== Monthly charts ===
Monthly chart performance for "After Like"
Chart (2022)	Peak position
South Korea (Circle)	1

=== Year-end charts ===
2022 year-end chart performance for "After Like"
Chart (2022)	Position
Global Excl. US (Billboard)	190
South Korea (Circle)	19

2023 year-end chart performance for "After Like"
Chart (2023)	Position
Japan Streaming (Billboard Japan)	96
South Korea (Circle)	10

2024 year-end chart performance for "After Like"
Chart (2024)	Position
South Korea (Circle)	87

2025 year-end chart performance for "After Like"
Chart (2025)	Position
South Korea (Circle)	182

== Certifications ==
Certifications for "After Like"
Region	Certification	Certified units/sales
New Zealand (RMNZ)	Gold	15,000^{‡}
Streaming
South Korea (KMCA)	Platinum	100,000,000^{†}
^{‡} Sales+streaming figures based on certification alone.^{†} Streaming-only figures based on certification alone.

== Release history ==
Release history for "After Like"
Region	Date	Format	Version	Label
Various	August 22, 2022	Digital download; streaming	Original	Starship; Kakao
Various	November 16, 2022	Streaming (Spotify only)	Holiday remix	Starship; Kakao

== See also ==
- List of Circle Digital Chart number ones of 2022
- List of Inkigayo Chart winners (2022)
- List of M Countdown Chart winners (2022)
- List of Music Bank Chart winners (2022)
- List of Show Champion Chart winners (2022)
- List of Show! Music Core Chart winners (2022)
- List of The Show Chart winners (2022)
