= Love Dive (song) =

- Japanese version cover

Single by Ive

from the album Love Dive
- Language: Korean; English
- B-side: "Royal"
- Released: April 5, 2022
- Recorded: Ingrid Studio
- Genre: Dark pop; electropop
- Length: 2:57
- Label: Starship; Kakao
- Composers: Sophia Brennan; Elle Campbell; Nick Hahn
- Lyricist: Seo Ji-eum

Ive singles chronology
"Eleven" (2021)	"Love Dive" (2022)	"After Like" (2022)

Music video
- "Love Dive" on YouTube

"Love Dive" is a song recorded by South Korean girl group Ive for their second single album of the same name. It was released as the single album's lead single by Starship Entertainment on April 5, 2022. It is a dark pop and electropop song that incorporates percussion sounds, rhythmic bass, synth and trap mix, with lyrics that "reinterpret cupid of the new era planning to shine on the stage". "Love Dive" is considered to be one of the group's signature songs.

"Love Dive" received critical acclaim for its production and vocals, and it was named by several publications as one of the best K-pop songs of the year. It experienced huge commercial success in South Korea, where it topped the Gaon Digital Chart for four weeks and became the best-performing single of the year. It reached the top ten in Japan, Malaysia, Singapore, Taiwan, and Vietnam, as well as on the Billboard Global Excl. US chart. The song has been certified platinum for streaming in South Korea, and went on to receive many accolades including Song of the Year at the MAMA Awards, Melon Music Awards, Asia Artist Awards, and Golden Disc Awards. Ive promoted the song with live performances on various weekly South Korean music programs, including M Countdown, Music Bank, Show! Music Core, and Inkigayo. As of May 2025, the accompanying music video for the song has reached over 300 million views on Starship Entertainment's YouTube channel.

== Background and release ==
On March 15, 2022, Starship Entertainment announced Ive would be releasing their second single album titled Love Dive on April 5. Three days later, the track listing for the single album was released, with "Love Dive" confirmed as the lead single. On March 21, a promotional video titled "Dear Cupid" was released. On April 4, the music video teaser for "Love Dive" was released. The highlight medley video was also released on the same day. On April 5, the song was released as the lead single of Love Dive, alongside the music video. The following year, a Japanese version of "Love Dive" was released on January 16, 2023.

== Composition ==
"Love Dive" was written by Sophia Brennan, Elle Campbell, and Nick Hahn who also produced the song. Seo Ji-eum translated the song from the original English demo recording. Musically, the song was described as a "modern" dark pop and electropop song with "addictive chorus and percussion sound" and "rhythmic bass synth and trap mix" with lyrics that "reinterpret cupid of the new era planning to shine on the stage". "Love Dive" was composed in the key of C-sharp minor, with a tempo of 118 beats per minute.

== Critical reception ==
"Love Dive" received widespread acclaim from critics, and was selected by multiple publications as among the best K-pop songs of 2022. Tássia Assis of NME praised "Love Dive" as a strong comeback for the rookie group, describing the single as "a siren song that serpentines through dark, atmospheric bass and lilting vocals". When selecting "Love Dive" as one of the 15 best K-pop songs released in the first half of 2022, Gladys Yeo of NME praised the song for its "mystical, captivating quality". Jung Su-min, in a positive review for IZM, praised the track's dark and ominous atmosphere, noting how the lyrics effectively invoked the myths of Narcissus and Cupid. In selecting "Love Dive" as one of the best K-pop songs of the year, Kat Moon of Time described the song as "dreamy and ethereal" with decadent vocals "you can't help but be submerged in".

Year-end lists for "Love Dive"
Critic/Publication	List	Rank	Ref.
Billboard	The 25 Best K-Pop Songs of 2022	2	
Cosmopolitan	The 15 Best K-Pop Songs of 2022, Ranked	9	
Dazed	The best K-pop tracks of 2022	2	
Idology	Closing 2022: 20 Songs of the Year	Placed	
Insider	The best K-pop songs of 2022	1	
IZM	Best Domestic Singles of 2022	Placed	
NME	The 50 best songs of 2022	30	
Nylon	The 20 Best K-pop Releases of 2022	Placed	
Teen Vogue	The 79 Best K-Pop Songs of 2022	Placed	
The Korea Herald	2022 Highlights of K-Pop	5	
Time	The Best K-Pop Songs and Albums of 2022	Placed	
YouTube Korea	Top 10 Most Popular Music Video in 2022	9	

== Accolades ==
"Love Dive" won 10 first place awards on South Korean music programs, including a triple crown on Inkigayo. With "Love Dive", Ive became only the 4th group in K-pop history to have won both a rookie award and a daesang prize in the same year, after 2NE1, Miss A, and Aespa.

Awards and nominations for "Love Dive"
Award ceremony	Year	Category	Result	Ref.
Asia Artist Awards	2022	Song of the Year	Won	
Asian Pop Music Awards	2022	Top 20 Songs of the Year (Overseas)	Won	
Circle Chart Music Awards	2023	Artist of the Year – Global Digital Music (April)	Won	
Genie Music Awards	2022	Song of the Year	Nominated	
Golden Disc Awards	2023	Song of the Year (Daesang)	Won	
Golden Disc Awards	2023	Best Digital Song (Bonsang)	Won	
Korean Music Awards	2023	Song of the Year	Nominated	
Korean Music Awards	2023	Best K-Pop Song	Nominated	
MAMA Awards	2022	Song of the Year	Won	
MAMA Awards	2022	Best Dance Performance – Female Group	Won	
Melon Music Awards	2022	Song of the Year	Won	
Seoul Music Awards	2023	Best Song	Won	

Music program awards
Program	Date	Ref.
Inkigayo	May 8, 2022	
Inkigayo	July 3, 2022	
Inkigayo	July 17, 2022	
M Countdown	May 5, 2022	
Music Bank	April 15, 2022	
Music Bank	April 22, 2022	
Music Bank	April 29, 2022	
Show Champion	April 13, 2022	
The Show	April 12, 2022	
The Show	April 19, 2022	

== Commercial performance ==
"Love Dive" debuted at number nine on South Korea's Gaon Digital Chart in the chart issue dated April 3–9, 2022, ascending to number one in the chart issue dated June 12–18, 2022. On the Billboard K-pop Hot 100, the song debuted at number 67 in the chart issue dated April 16, 2022, ascending to number one in the chart issue dated April 30, 2022. The song debuted at number two on the Billboard South Korea Songs in the chart issue dated May 7, 2022, ascending to number one in the chart issue dated July 9, 2022.

In New Zealand, the song debuted at number 26 on the RMNZ Hot Singles in the chart issue dated April 11, 2022, ascending to number 11 in the following week. In Japan, the song debuted at number 22 on the Billboard Japan Japan Hot 100 in the chart issue dated April 13, 2022, ascendeding to number eight in the following week. On the Oricon Combined Singles, the song debuted at number 15 in the chart issue dated April 18, 2022, ascending to number six in the following week.

In Singapore, the song debuted at number nine on the RIAS Top Streaming Chart and number two on the RIAS Top Regional Chart in the chart issue dated April 1–7, 2022, ascending to number two on the RIAS Top Streaming Chart and number one on the RIAS Top Regional Chart in the following week. The song also debuted at number 19 on the Billboard Singapore Songs in the chart issue dated April 16, 2022, ascending to number two in the following week. In Malaysia, the song debuted at number 19 on the RIM Top 20 Most Streamed International and Domestic Songs in the chart issue dated April 1–7, 2022, and ascending to number four in the following week. It also debuted at number four on the Billboard Malaysia Songs in the chart issue dated April 23, 2022. On the Billboard Vietnam Vietnam Hot 100, the song debuted at number 54 in the chart issue dated April 14, 2022, ascending to number six in the following week. In Indonesia, the song debuted at number 12 on the Billboard Indonesia Songs in the chart issue dated April 23, 2022. In Philippines, the song debuted at number 11 on the Billboard Philippines Songs in the chart issue dated April 23, 2022. In Taiwan, the song debuted at number 7 on the Billboard Taiwan Songs in the chart issue dated April 23, 2022. In Hong Kong, the song debuted at number 9 on the Billboard Hong Kong Songs in the chart issue dated April 23, 2022.

In United States, the song debuted at number eight on the Billboard World Digital Song Sales in the chart issue dated April 16, 2022. In Canada, the song debuted at number 92 on the Billboard Canadian Hot 100 in the chart issue dated April 23, 2022. Globally, the song debuted at number 177 on the Billboard Global 200, and number 105 on the Billboard Global Excl. U.S. in the chart issue dated April 16, 2022. It ascended to number 15 on the Billboard Global 200, and number ten on the Billboard Global Excl. U.S. in the following week.

== Music video ==
The music video, directed by Haus of Team, was released alongside the song by Starship Entertainment on April 5, 2022. The music video portrays the girls "playing the roles of chic, modern cupids" performing in a "luxurious, ever-changing", and "mystical castle" positioned amongst clouds" with scenes that switches between "various locations within the castle" before transitioning to "breathtaking dance break performance". The music video accumulated 10 million views within 10 hours of its release. On June 15, 2022, the music video surpassed 100 million views on YouTube.

== In popular culture ==
In the 2026 SBS television series Phantom Lawyer, Yoo Yeon-seok's character performs the choreography of "Love Dive" while possessed by the ghost of an idol trainee. The performance subsequently drew a positive reaction from Ive's members.

In October 2026, Krafton announced a collaboration between PUBG: Battlegrounds and Ive themed around "Love Dive", incorporating elements of the song's music video into the game.

== Promotion ==
Following the single album's release, on April 5, 2022, Ive held a live event to introduce the single album including "Love Dive" and to communicate with their fans. The group subsequently performed on four music programs in the first week: Mnet's M Countdown on April 7, KBS's Music Bank on April 8, MBC's Show! Music Core on April 9, SBS' Inkigayo on April 10. In the second week, they performed on five music programs: SBS MTV's The Show on April 12, MBC M's Show Champion on April 13, Mnet's M Countdown on April 14, KBS's Music Bank on April 15, and SBS's Inkigayo on April 17, where they won first place for all appearances except M Countdown and Inkigayo. In the third week, they performed on The Show on April 19, and Music Bank on April 22, where they won first place for both appearances.

== Credits and personnel ==
Credits adopted from the album liner notes.

- Ive – vocals
- Kriz – background vocals, vocal director
- Seo Ji-eum – lyrics
- Nick Hahn - composition, arrangement
- Sophia Brennan – composition
- Elle Campbell – composition
- Yang Yeong Eun – recording engineer (at Ingrid Studio)
- Jeong Eun Kyung – recording engineer
- Alawn – mixing engineer
- Kwon Nam Woo – mastering engineer

== Charts ==
=== Weekly charts ===
Weekly chart performance for "Love Dive"
Chart (2022)	Peak position
Canada (Canadian Hot 100)	92
Global 200 (Billboard)	15
Hong Kong (Billboard)	9
Indonesia (Billboard)	12
Japan (Japan Hot 100)	8
Japan Combined Singles (Oricon)	6
Malaysia (Billboard)	4
Malaysia International (RIM)	4
New Zealand Hot Singles (RMNZ)	11
Philippines (Billboard)	11
Singapore (Billboard)	2
Singapore (RIAS)	2
South Korea (Gaon)	1
South Korea (K-pop Hot 100)	1
Taiwan (Billboard)	7
US World Digital Song Sales (Billboard)	8
Vietnam (Vietnam Hot 100)	6

=== Monthly charts ===
Monthly chart performance for "Love Dive"
Chart (2022)	Peak position
South Korea (Circle)	1

=== Year-end charts ===
2022 year-end chart performance for "Love Dive"
Chart (2022)	Position
Global 200 (Billboard)	160
Japan (Japan Hot 100)	69
South Korea (Circle)	1

2023 year-end chart performance for "Love Dive"
Chart (2023)	Position
South Korea (Circle)	15

2024 year-end chart performance for "Love Dive"
Chart (2024)	Position
South Korea (Circle)	61

2025 year-end chart performance for "Love Dive"
Chart (2025)	Position
South Korea (Circle)	152

== Certifications ==
Certifications for "Love Dive"
Region	Certification	Certified units/sales
New Zealand (RMNZ)	Gold	15,000^{‡}
Streaming
South Korea (KMCA)	Platinum	100,000,000^{†}
^{‡} Sales+streaming figures based on certification alone.^{†} Streaming-only figures based on certification alone.

== Release history ==
Release history for "Love Dive"
Region	Date	Format	Version	Label
Various	April 5, 2022	Digital download; streaming	Original (Korean)	Starship; Kakao
Various	January 16, 2023	Digital download; streaming	Japanese	Kioon; Sony Japan

== See also ==
- List of Gaon Digital Chart number ones of 2022
- List of Inkigayo Chart winners (2022)
- List of K-pop Hot 100 number ones
- List of M Countdown Chart winners (2022)
- List of Music Bank Chart winners (2022)
- List of Show Champion Chart winners (2022)
- List of The Show Chart winners (2022)
