= List of Show! Music Core Chart winners (2022) =

Winners of South Korean music program Show! Music Core

Show! Music Core Chart winners (2022)

Highlights
- Song with most wins: "INVU" by Taeyeon & "After Like" by Ive (4)
- Artist(s) with most wins: Ive (7)
- Song with highest score: "Beatbox" by NCT Dream (9,800)

The Show! Music Core Chart is a record chart on the South Korean MBC television music program Show! Music Core. Every week, the show awards the best-performing single on the chart in the country during its live broadcast.

In 2022, 21 singles achieved number one on the chart, and 17 acts were awarded first-place trophies. "Beatbox" by NCT Dream had the highest score of the year, with 9,800 points on the June 11 broadcast. Taeyeon's "INVU" and Ive's "After Like" won four trophies each, making both singles the most-awarded songs of the year. "Eleven" and "After Like" by Ive spent a combined total of seven weeks atop the chart, making them the most awarded act of 2022.

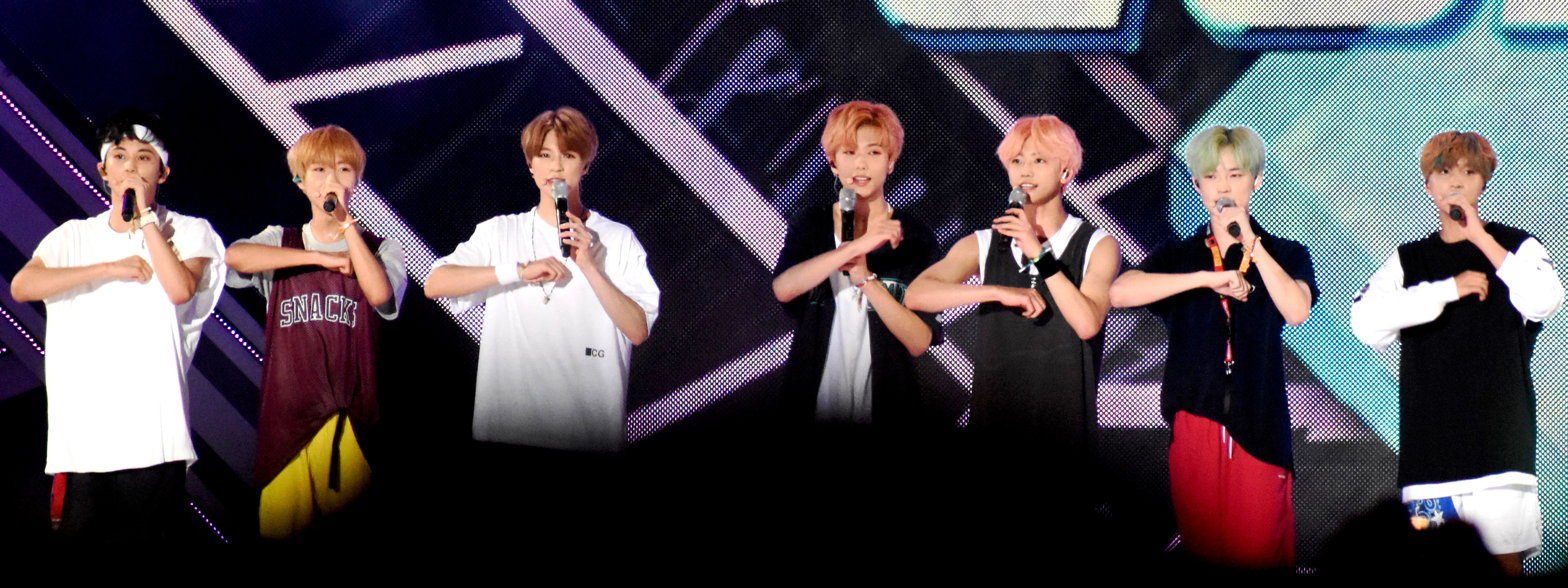
NCT Dream's (pictured) win for "Beatbox" had the highest score of 2022, with 9,800 points at the June 11th broadcast

== Chart history ==
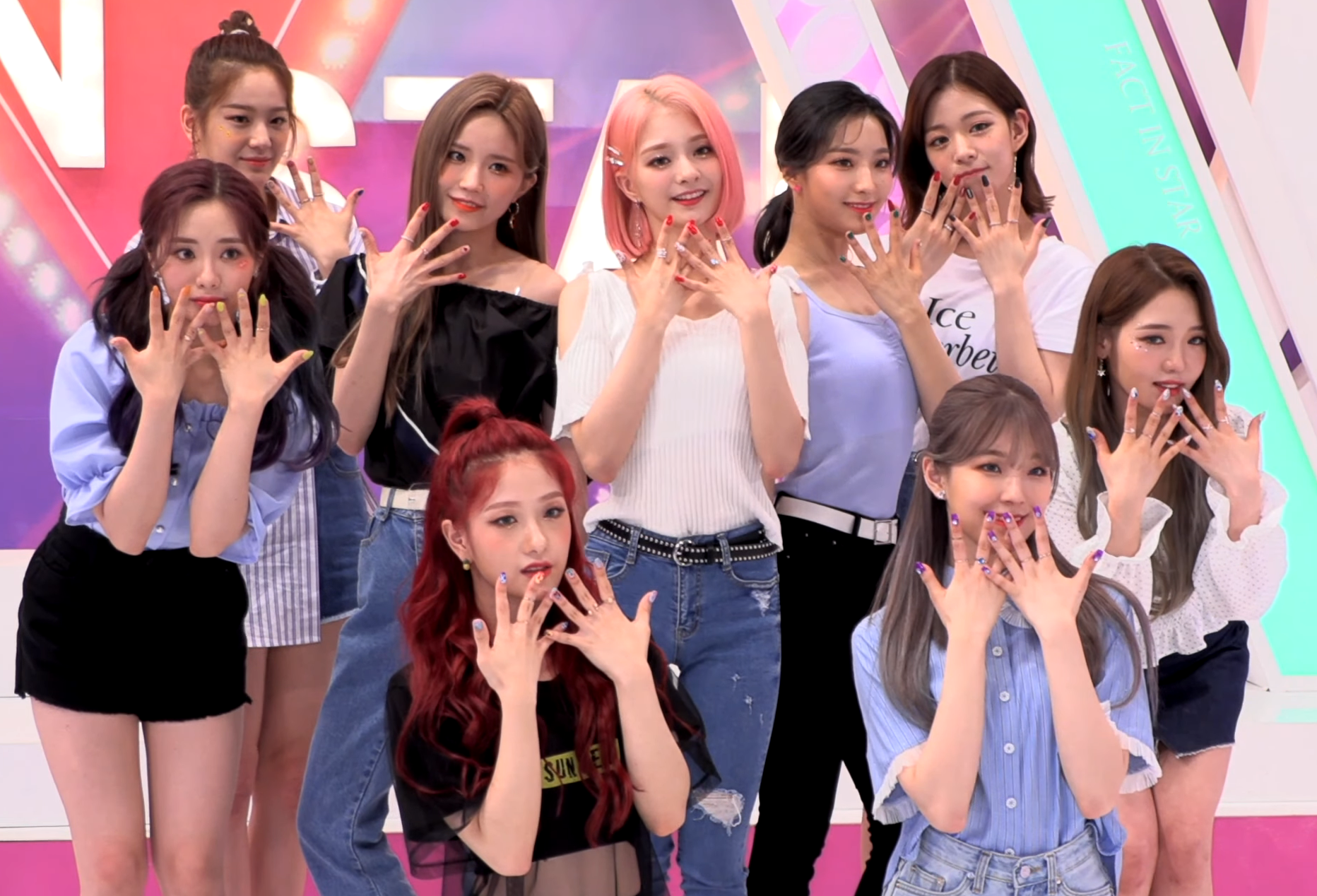
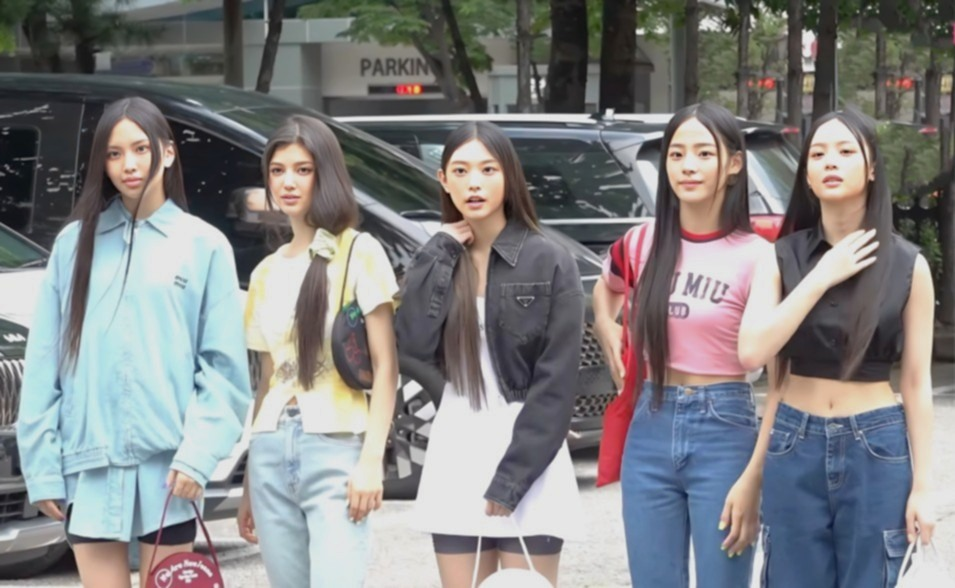
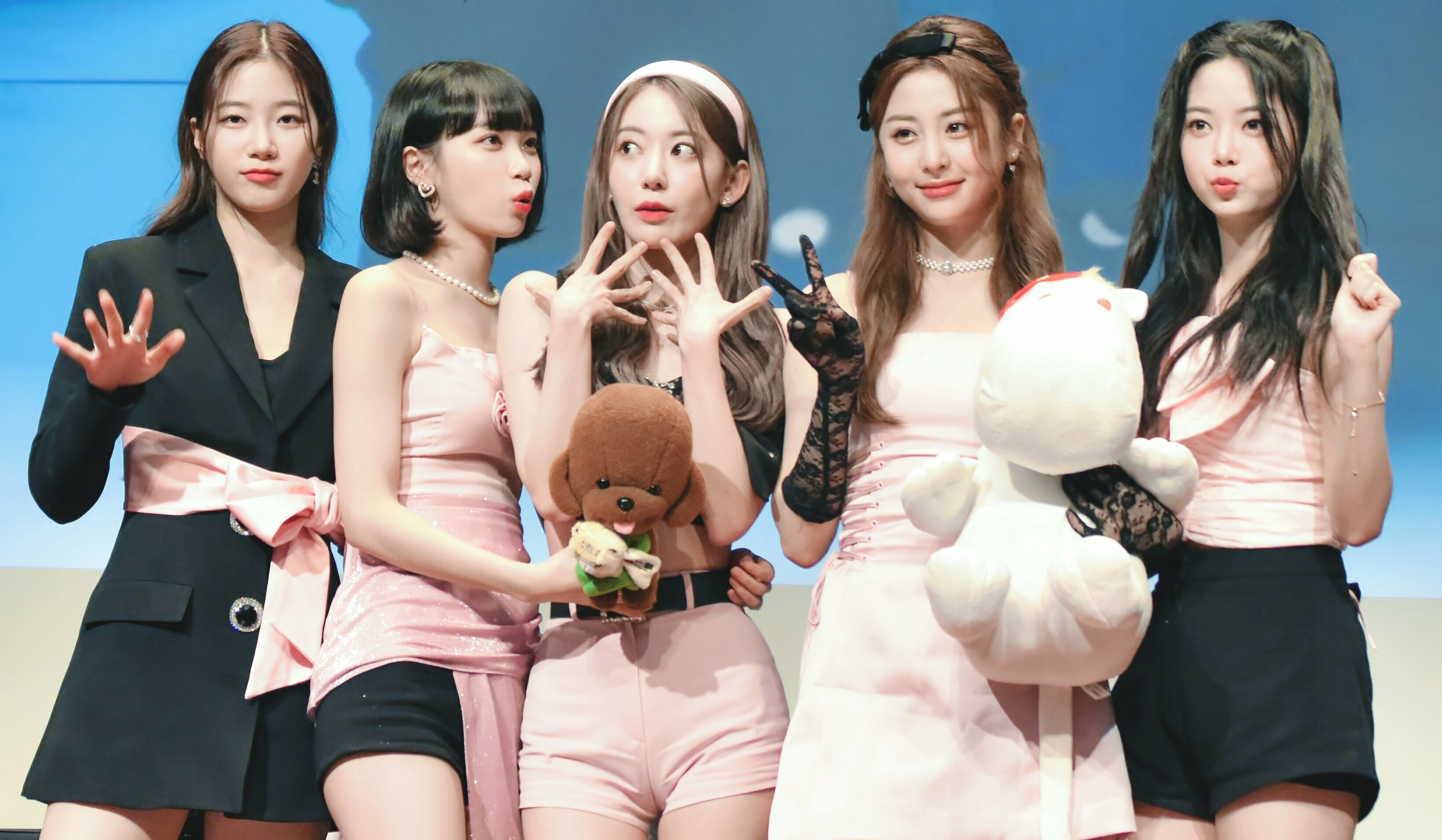
Fromis 9 (top), NewJeans (middle), and Le Sserafim (bottom) received their first Show! Music Core trophies for "Stay This Way," "Attention," and "Antifragile," respectively.

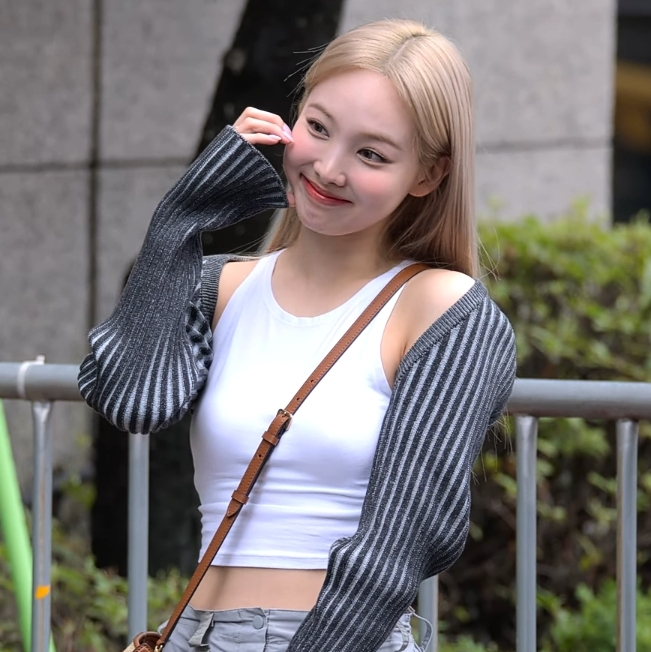
Twice's Nayeon (pictured) won Show! Music Core for the first time with "Pop!."

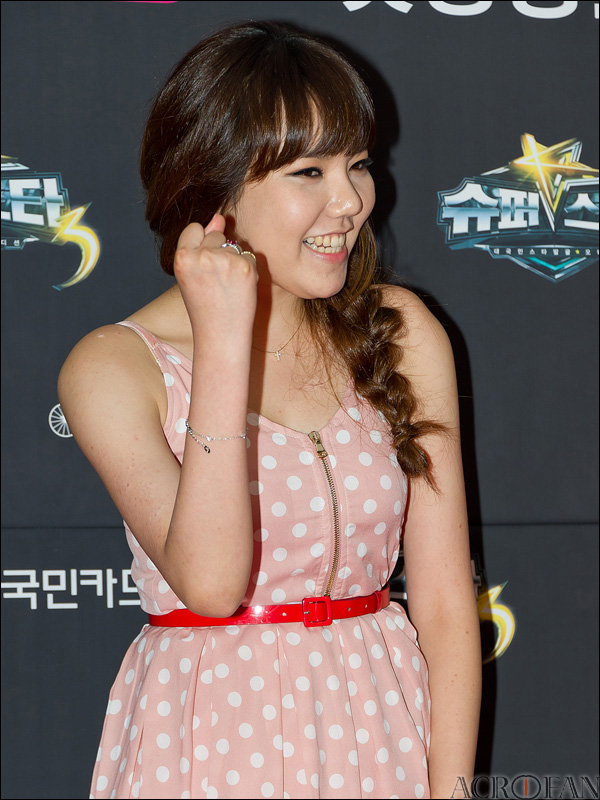
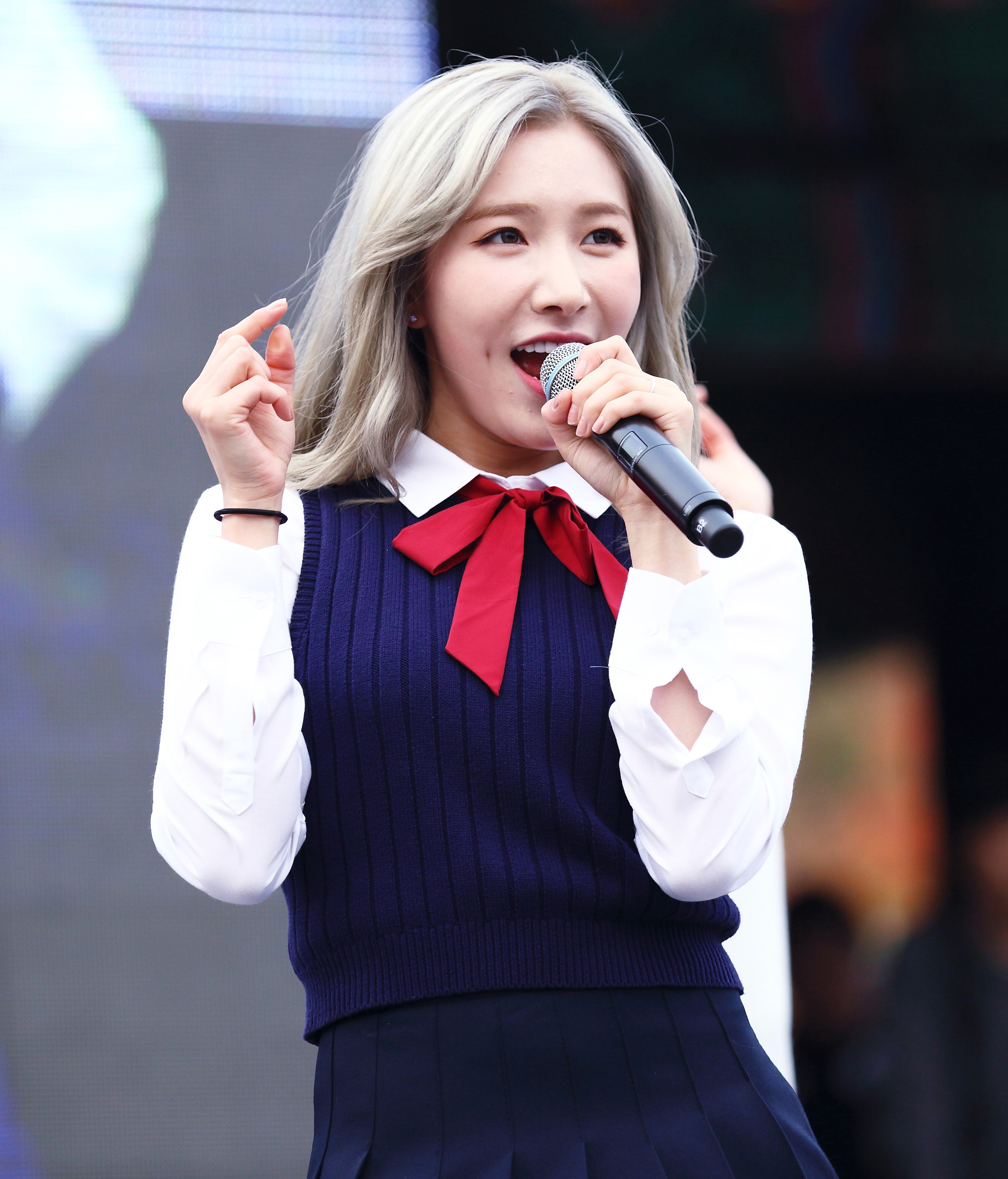
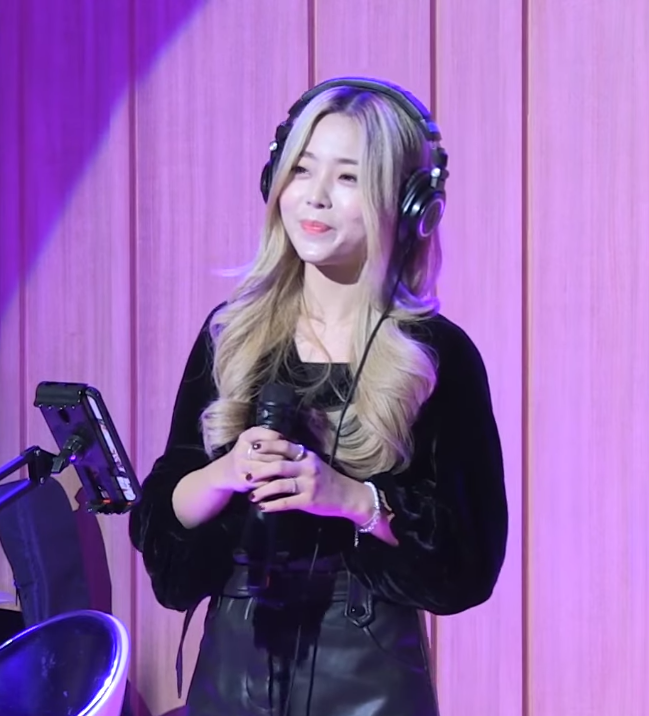
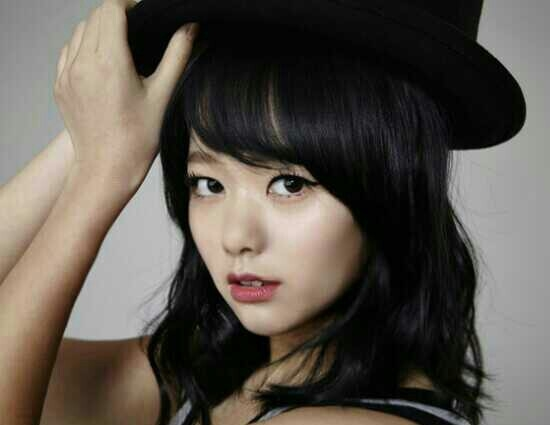
The Gaya-G unit (Lee Bo-ram (upper left), Laboum's Soyeon (upper right), Hynn (lower left), and Jung Ji-so (lower right)) of the Hangout with Yoo project group WSG Wannabe received their first music show trophy for "At That Moment" at Show! Music Core. The win also served as Hynn and Jung Ji-so's first time placing first at a music show.

Key
	Indicates a Quintuple Crown
	Highest score in 2022
—	No show was held

Episode	Date	Artist	Song	Points	Ref.
—	January 1	No show, winner not announced			
753	January 8	Ive	"Eleven"	6,408	
754	January 15	Ive	"Eleven"	6,532	
755	January 22	Ive	"Eleven"	6,600	
—	January 29	No show, winner not announced			
—	February 5	No show, winner not announced			
—	February 12	No show, winner not announced			
—	February 19	No show, winner not announced			
756	February 26	Taeyeon	"INVU"	7,277	
757	March 5	Taeyeon	"INVU"	6,379	
758	March 12	Taeyeon	"INVU"	7,180	
759	March 19	Taeyeon	"INVU"	7,287	
760	March 26	(G)I-dle	"Tomboy"	7,588	
—	April 2	No show, winner not announced			
761	April 9	NCT Dream	"Glitch Mode"	9,300	
—	April 16	No show, winner not announced			
762	April 23	Big Bang	"Still Life"	7,165	
763	April 30	Big Bang	"Still Life"	7,883	
764	May 7	Big Bang	"Still Life"	6,551	
765	May 14	Lim Young-woong	"If We Ever Meet Again"	7,885	
766	May 21	Psy	"That That"	6,586	
—	May 28	No show, winner not announced			
767	June 4	Kang Daniel	"Upside Down"	7,820	
768	June 11	NCT Dream	"Beatbox"	9,800	
—	June 18	No show, winner not announced			
769	June 25	BTS	"Yet to Come"	7,415	
770	July 2	Lim Young-woong	"If We Ever Meet Again"	6,678	
771	July 9	Fromis 9	"Stay This Way"	8,242	
772	July 16	Nayeon	"Pop!"	7,022	
773	July 23	WSG Wannabe (GayaG)	"At That Moment"	6,153	
—	July 30	No show, winner not announced			
774	August 6	WSG Wannabe (GayaG)	"At That Moment"	6,378	
775	August 13	Special episode, winner not announced			
776	August 20	NewJeans	"Attention"	7,495	
777	August 27	The Boyz	"Whisper"	6,197	
778	September 3	Ive	"After Like"	9,191	
—	September 10	No show, winner not announced			
779	September 17	Ive	"After Like"	7,807	
780	September 24	Ive	"After Like"	6,935	
781	October 1	NCT 127	"2 Baddies"	6,638	
782	October 8	Blackpink	"Shut Down"	7,472	
—	October 15	No show, winner not announced			
783	October 22	Ive	"After Like"	6,672	
784	October 29	(G)I-dle	"Nxde"	9,081	
—	November 5	No show, winner not announced			
785	November 12	(G)I-dle	"Nxde"	7,684	
786	November 19	(G)I-dle	"Nxde"	6,191	
787	November 26	Lim Young-woong	"London Boy"	7,060	
788	December 3	Le Sserafim	"Antifragile"	6,384	
789	December 10	Le Sserafim	"Antifragile"	6,017	
790	December 17	Le Sserafim	"Antifragile"	6,396	
791	December 24	Special episode, winner not announced			
—	December 31	No show, winner not announced			

== See also ==
- List of Show! Music Core Chart winners (2021)
