= List of M Countdown Chart winners (2022) =

Winners of South Korean music program M Countdown

M Countdown Chart winners (2022)

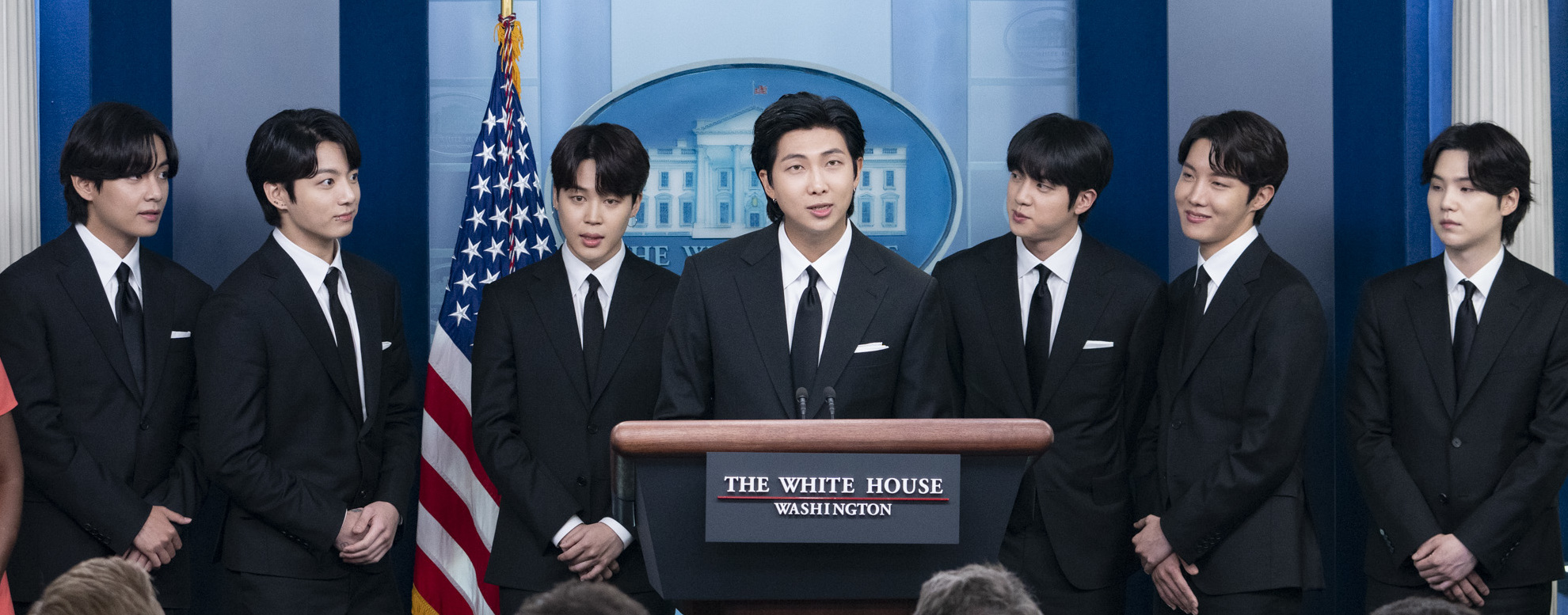
BTS' (pictured) win for "Yet to Come" had the highest score of 2022 so far, with 11,000 points on the June 23rd broadcast. The song also marked BTS' first Triple Crown on M Countdown.

The M Countdown Chart is a record chart on the South Korean Mnet television music program M Countdown. Every week, the show awards the best-performing single on the chart in the country during its live broadcast.

In 2022, 31 singles ranked number one on the chart and 26 music acts received first-place trophies. "Yet to Come" by BTS had the highest score of the year, with 11,000 points on the June 23 broadcast. Four songs collected trophies for three weeks and achieved a Triple Crown: Big Bang's "Still Life", BTS' "Yet to Come", and Blackpink's "Pink Venom" and "Shut Down".

== Scoring system ==
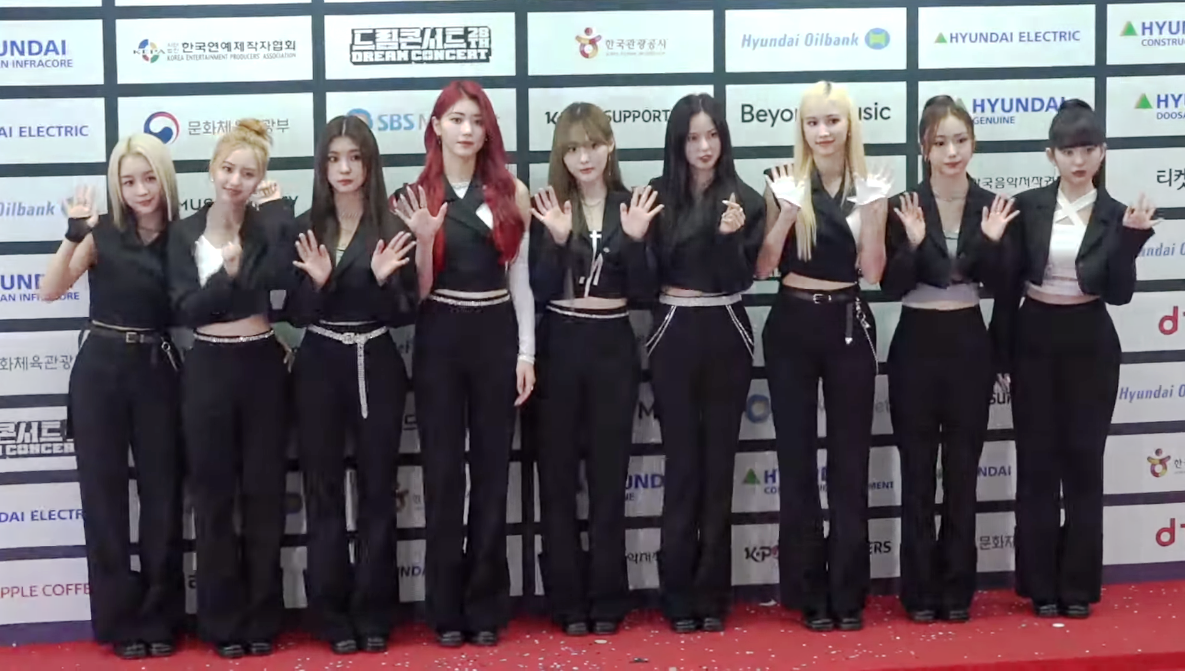
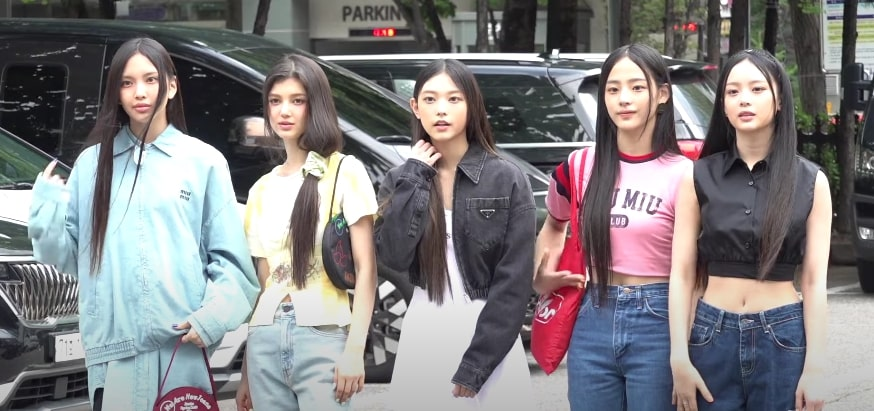
Kep1er (top) and NewJeans (bottom) won their first ever music show trophies for "Wa Da Da" and "Attention," respectively.
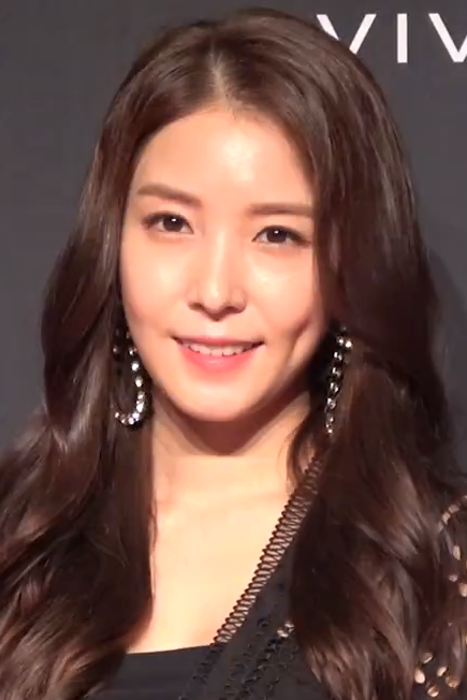
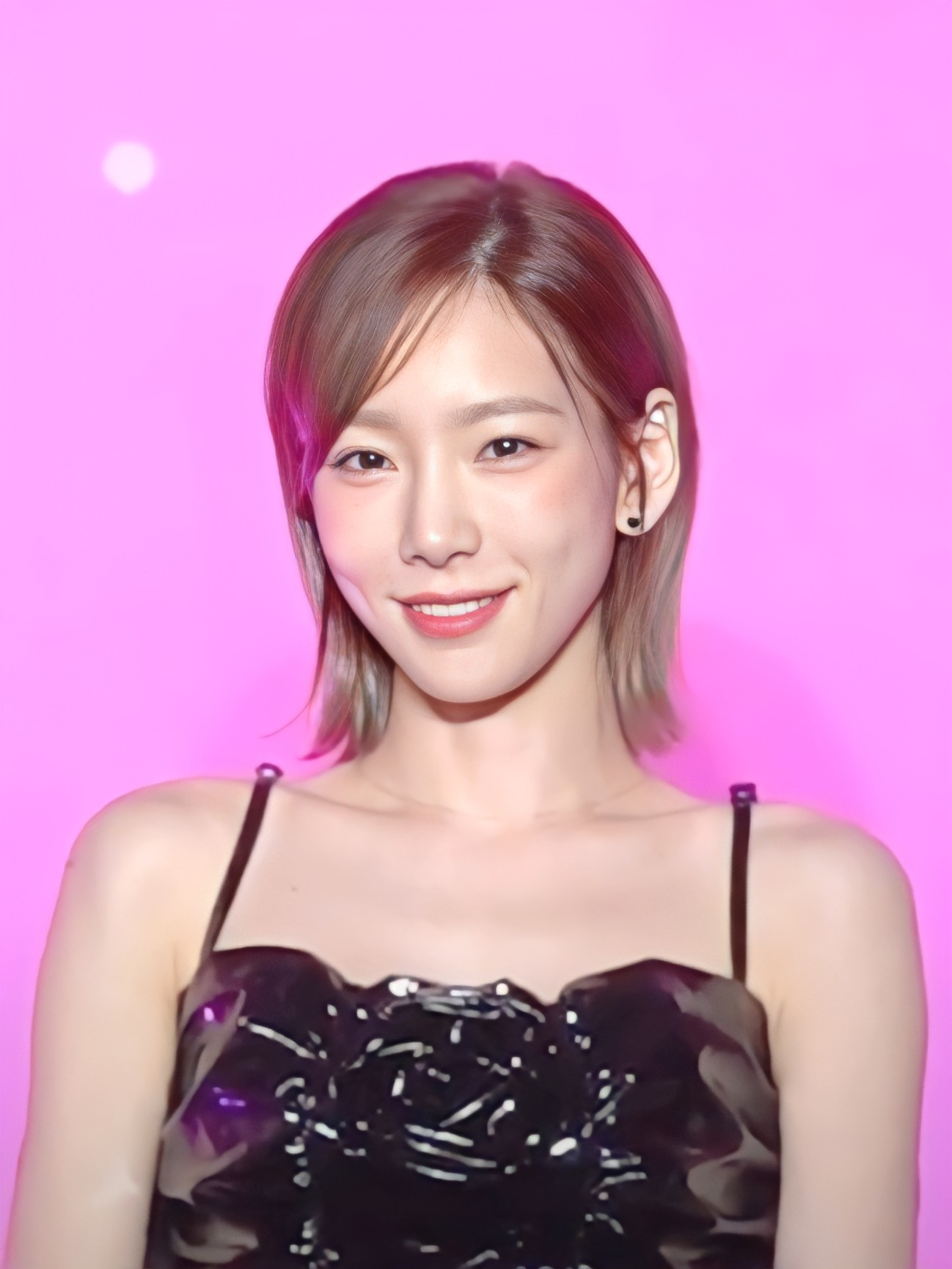
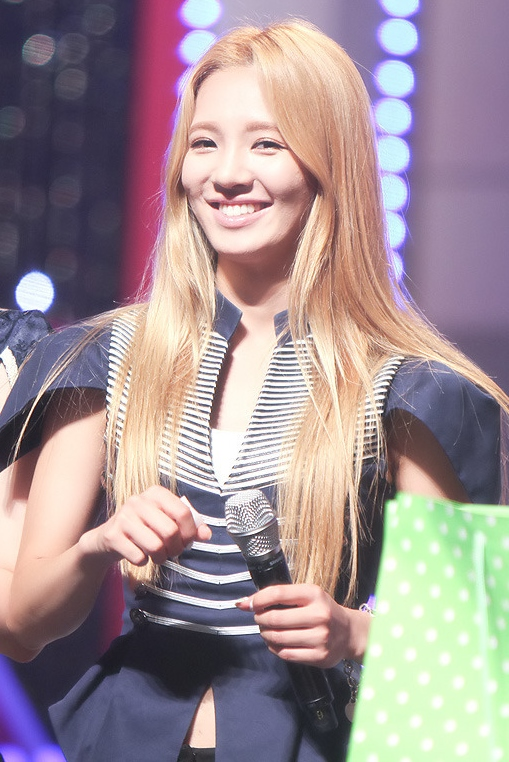
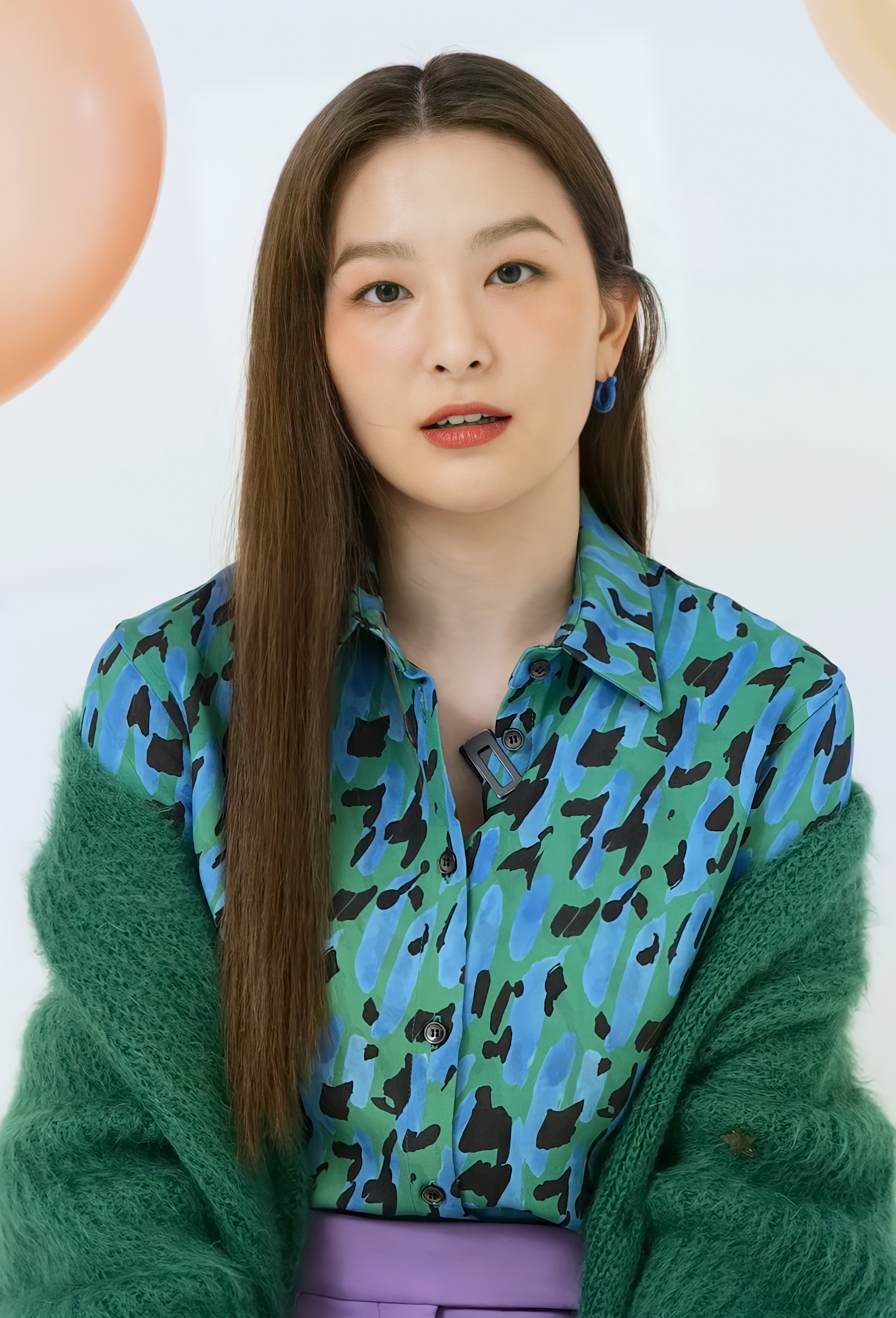
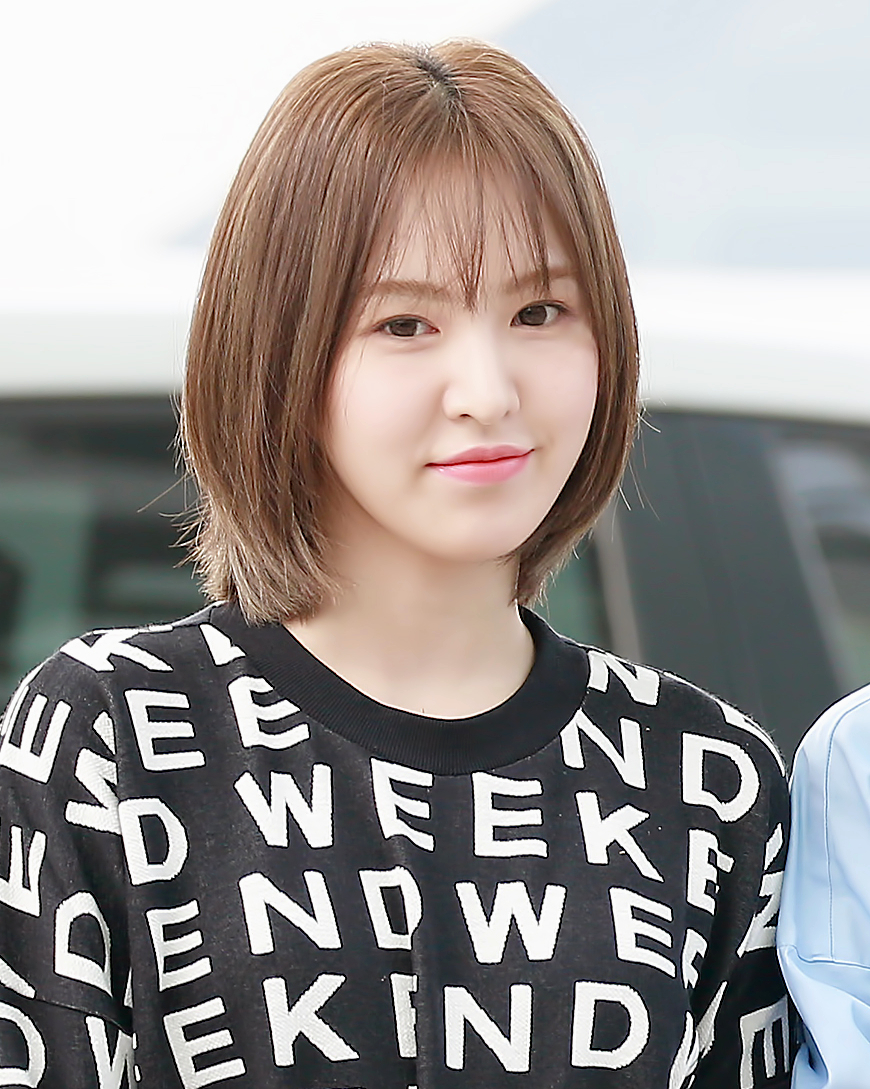
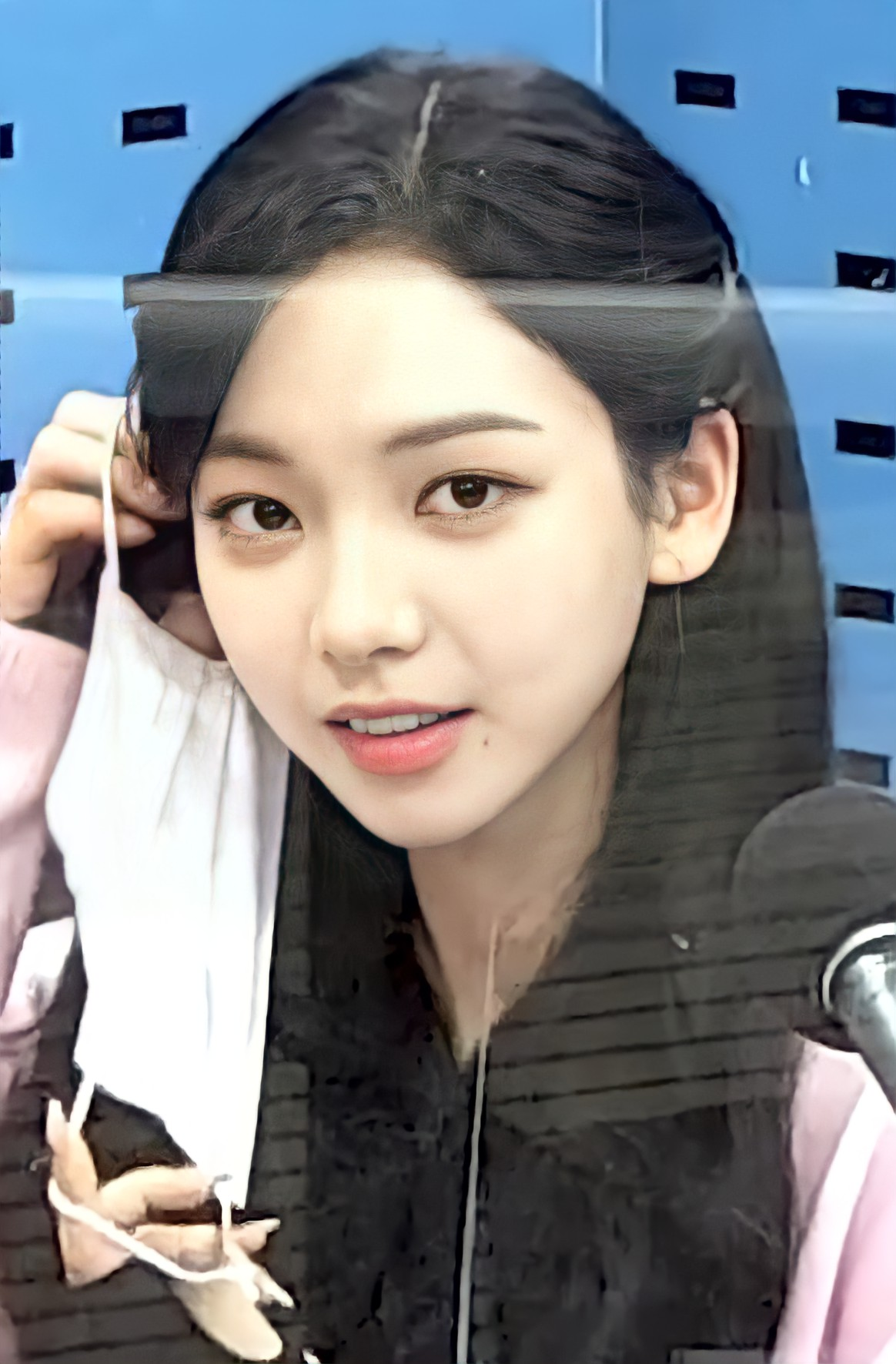
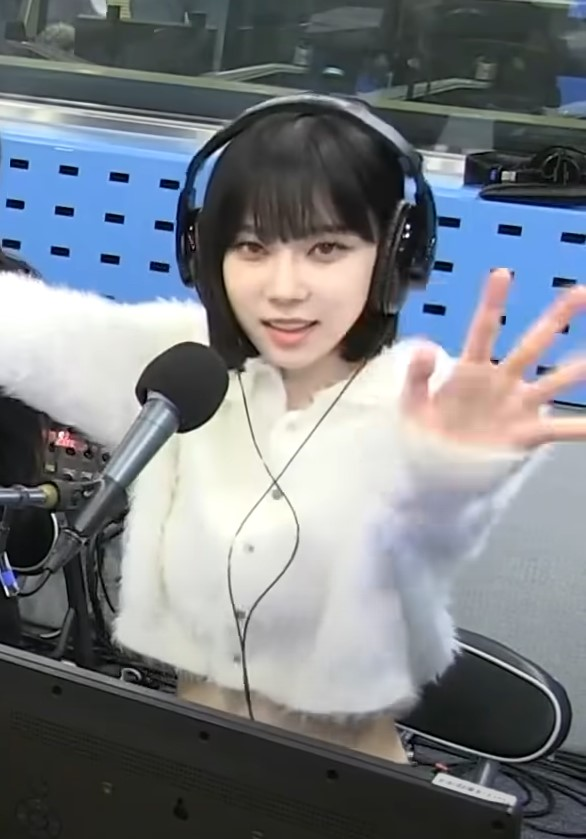
Got the Beat (pictured) earned their first M Countdown trophy for "Step Back."
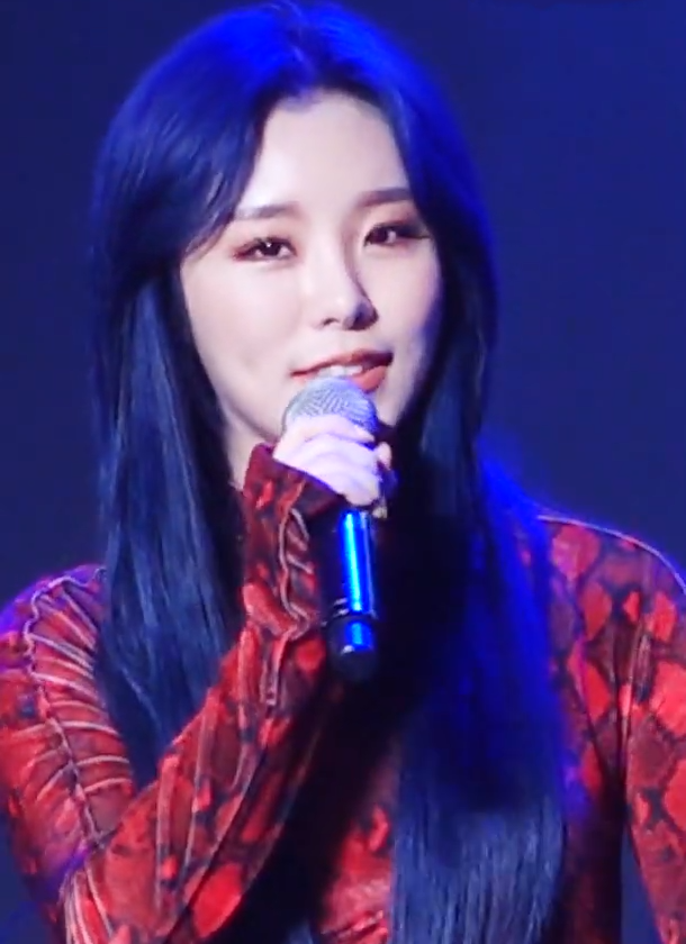
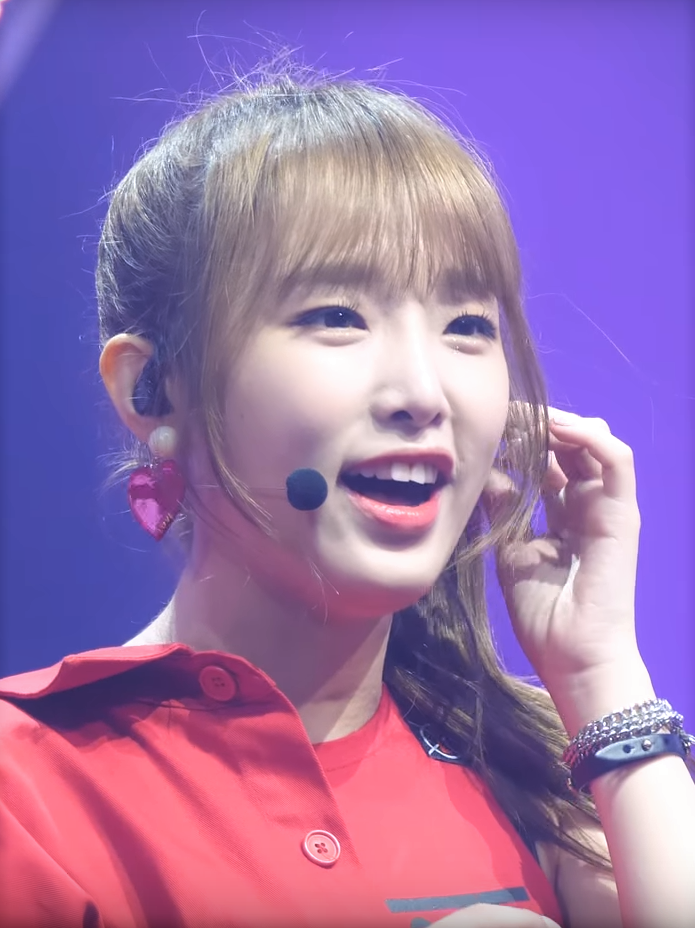
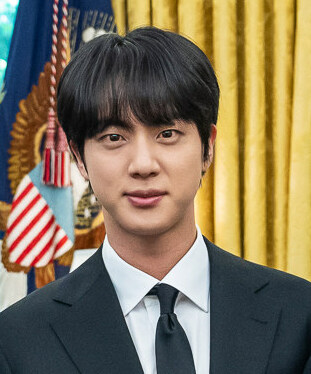
Wheein of Mamamoo (left), Yena (middle), and Jin of BTS (right) won their first ever music show trophies as soloists with their awards for "Make Me Happy," "Smiley," and "The Astronaut," respectively.
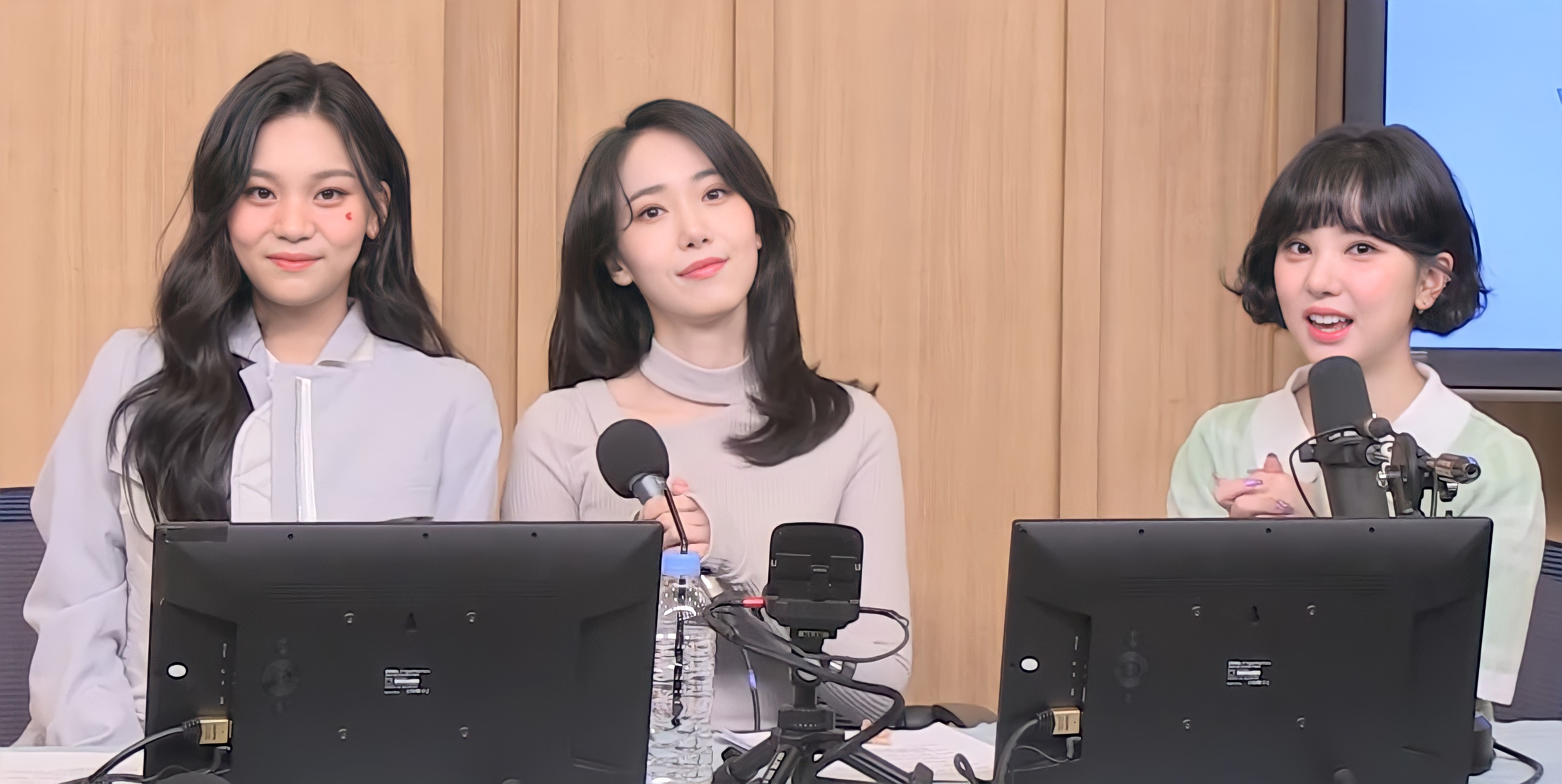
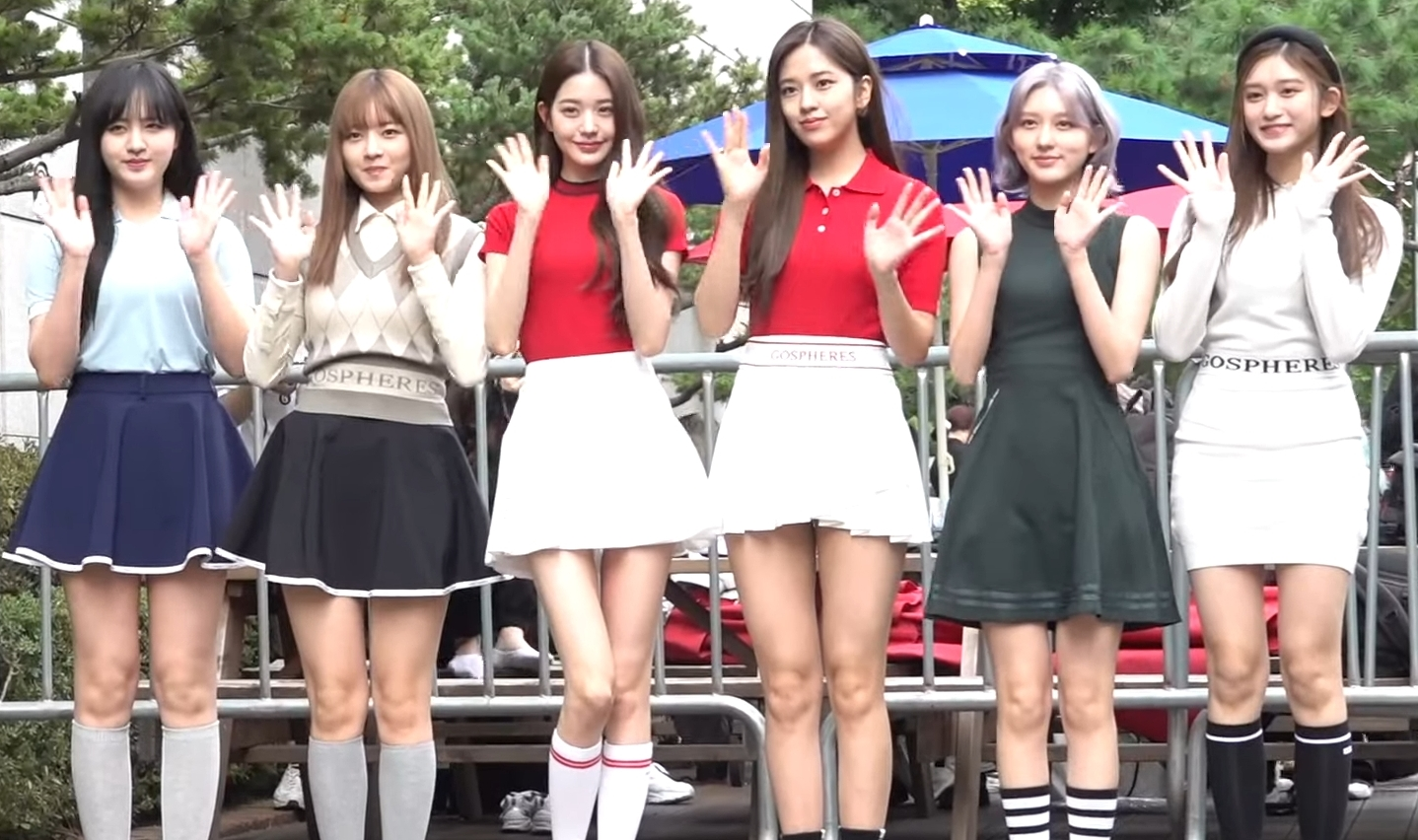
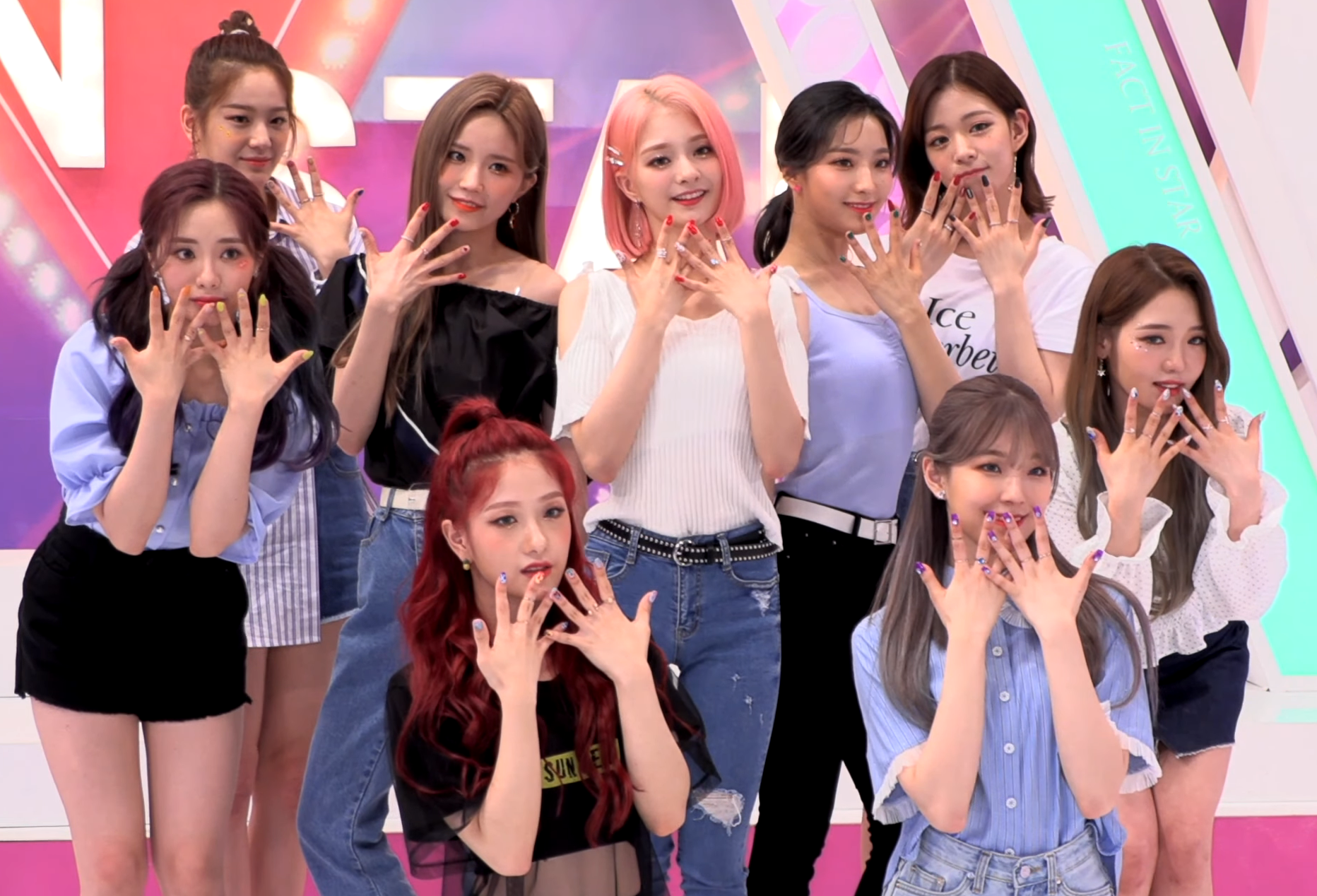
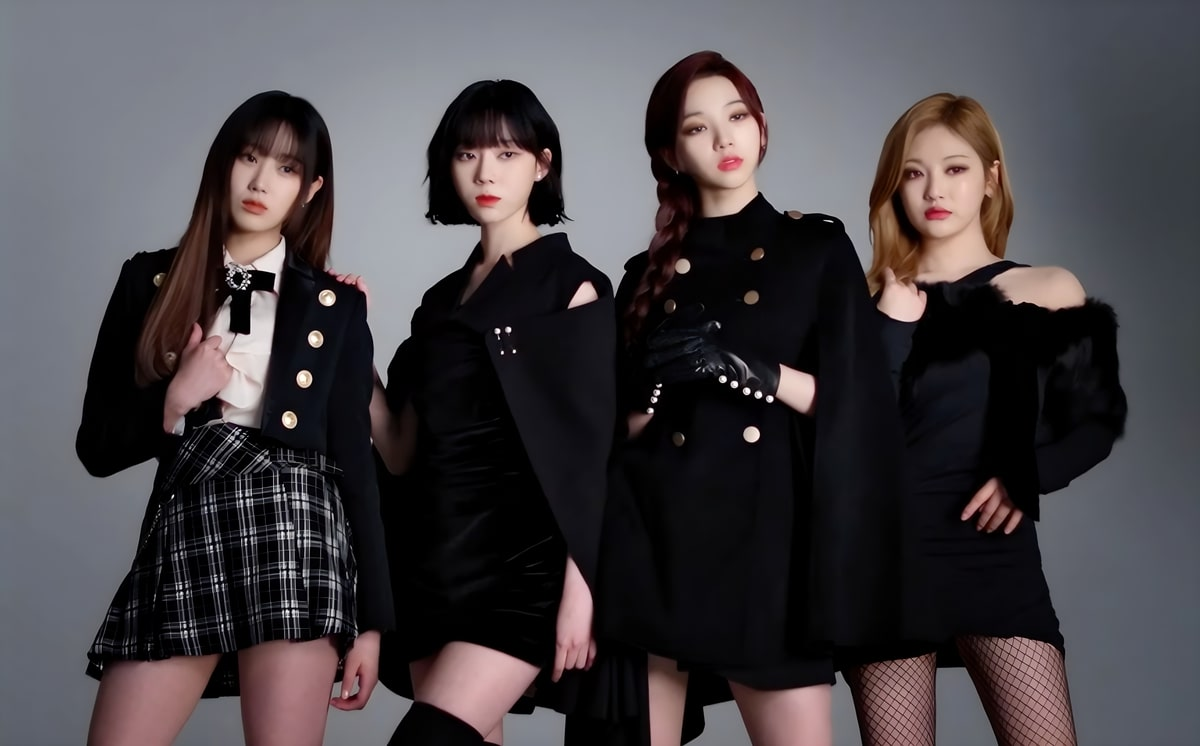
Viviz (top), Ive (second from top), Fromis 9 (third from top), and Aespa (bottom) won their first M Countdown trophies with "Bop Bop!," "Love Dive," "Stay This Way," and "Girls," respectively.
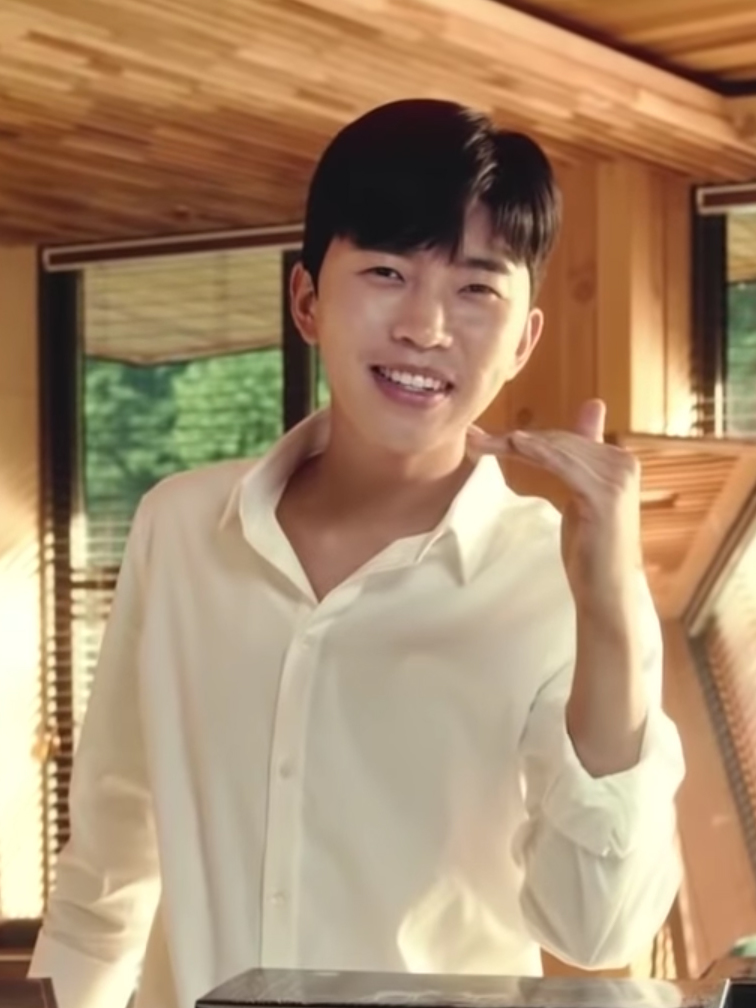
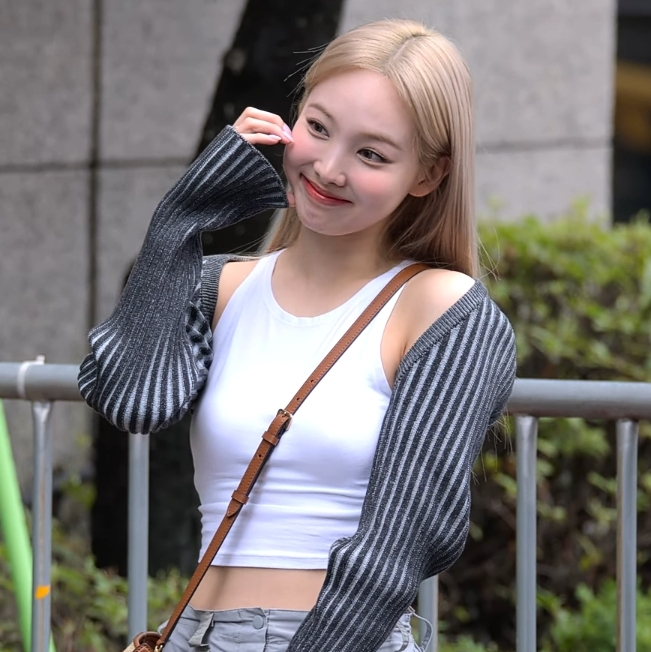
Lim Young-woong (left) and Nayeon of Twice (right) won their first M Countdown trophies as soloists with their awards for "If We Ever Meet Again" and "Pop!," respectively.

Period covered	Chart system				
Period covered	Broadcast	Digital sales	Physical album	Video views	Voting
May 28, 2020 – April 7, 2022	10%	45%	15%	15%	25% (15% pre-vote + 10% live-vote)
April 14, 2022 – present	10%	50%	15%	10%	25% (15% pre-vote + 10% live-vote)

== Chart history ==
Key
	Triple Crown
	Highest score of the year
—	No show was held

Episode	Date	Artist	Song	Points	Ref.
—N/a	January 6	No Broadcast or Winner			
735	January 13	Kep1er	"Wa Da Da"	6,500	
736	January 20	Kep1er	"Wa Da Da"	6,569	
737	January 27	Wheein	"Make Me Happy"	7,220	
738	February 3	Got the Beat	"Step Back"	—N/a	
739	February 10	Yena	"Smiley"	8,097	
740	February 17	Viviz	"Bop Bop!"	6,564	
741	February 24	Taeyeon	"INVU"	9,676	
742	March 3	BtoB	"The Song"	8,976	
743	March 10	STAYC	"Run2U"	—N/a	
744	March 17	STAYC	"Run2U"	6,569	
745	March 24	(G)I-dle	"Tomboy"	8,259	
746	March 31	(G)I-dle	"Tomboy"	7,688	
747	April 7	NCT Dream	"Glitch Mode"	7,536	
748	April 14	Big Bang	"Still Life"	8,181	
749	April 21	Big Bang	"Still Life"	8,216	
750	April 28	Big Bang	"Still Life"	8,256	
751	May 5	Ive	"Love Dive"	7,520	
752	May 12	Lim Young-woong	"If We Ever Meet Again"	8,896	
753	May 19	Psy feat. Suga	"That That"	—N/a	
754	May 26	Astro	"Candy Sugar Pop"	8,434	
755	June 2	Seventeen	"Hot"	7,718	
756	June 9	NCT Dream	"Beatbox"	—N/a	
757	June 16	BTS	"Yet to Come"	10,333	
758	June 23	BTS	"Yet to Come"	11,000	
759	June 30	BTS	"Yet to Come"	9,037	
760	July 7	Fromis 9	"Stay This Way"	9,262	
761	July 14	Nayeon	"Pop!"	7,266	
762	July 21	Aespa	"Girls"	7,741	
763	July 28	Seventeen	"_World"	10,633	
764	August 4	Seventeen	"_World"	6,746	
765	August 11	Itzy	"Sneakers"	7,944	
766	August 18	NewJeans	"Attention"	—N/a	
767	August 25	Blackpink	"Pink Venom"	7,951	
768	September 1	Blackpink	"Pink Venom"	9,071	
769	September 8	Blackpink	"Pink Venom"	9,033	
770	September 15	Ive	"After Like"	—N/a	
771	September 22	Blackpink	"Shut Down"	9,316	
772	September 29	Blackpink	"Shut Down"	8,377	
773	October 6	Blackpink	"Shut Down"	9,468	
774	October 13	Stray Kids	"Case 143"	7,658	
775	October 20	Stray Kids	"Case 143"	10,756	
776	October 27	(G)I-dle	"Nxde"	—N/a	
—N/a	November 3	No Broadcast or Winner			
777	November 10	Jin	"The Astronaut"	—N/a	
—N/a	November 17	No Broadcast or Winner			
—N/a	November 24	No Broadcast or Winner			
—N/a	December 1	No Broadcast or Winner			
—N/a	December 8	No Broadcast or Winner			
—N/a	December 15	No Broadcast or Winner			
—N/a	December 22	No Broadcast or Winner			
778	December 29	NCT Dream	"Candy"	6,323	
