= Growls and Purrs =

2025 single by Jo Yuri

Single by Jo Yuri

from the EP Episode 25
- Language: Korean
- Released: July 7, 2025
- Genre: K-pop; Synth-pop
- Length: 3:19
- Label: WakeOne; Genie Music; Stone Music
- Composer: Gu-reum
- Lyricists: Gu-reum; Jo Yuri

Jo Yuri singles chronology
"Taxi" (2023)	"Growls and Purrs" (2025)	"Farewell for now!" (2025)

Music video
- "Growls and Purrs" on YouTube

"Growls and Purrs" (Korean: 개와 고양이의 시간; RR: Gaewa goyangiui sigan; lit. 'Time of dogs and cats') is a song recorded by South Korean singer Jo Yuri for her third extended play Episode 25. It was released as a pre-release single by WakeOne on July 7, 2025.

== Background and release ==
On June 25, 2025, WakeOne announced that Jo Yuri would release her third extended play Episode 25 on July 14, 2025. It would be her first album release in about two years since Love All in August 2023. "Growls and Purrs" was confirmed as the pre-release song and one of the album's double title tracks. The song was performed at Jo's fan concert in April 2025 and at KCON Japan 2025 before its release.

"Growls and Purrs" was released on July 7, 2025, a week before Episode 25. The song's video, titled "VHS Diary", was released through Jo's official YouTube channel. In an interview, Jo stated that her experience as an actor helped her be more comfortable when filming the video.

== Composition ==
"Growls and Purrs" was written by Gu-reum and Jo Yuri, and composed and arranged by Gu-reum. The song was described as a synth-pop band track with a lovely atmosphere. Its lyrics express cute emotions of acting spoiled toward a cherished person, sometimes like a cat and sometimes like a dog.

== Promotion ==
Before its official release, Jo Yuri performed "Growls and Purrs" at her fan concert and at KCON Japan 2025. Following the release of Episode 25, Jo performed "Growls and Purrs" on Mnet's M Countdown, KBS's Music Bank, and MBC's Show! Music Core.

On July 9, Jo released a behind-the-scenes video for "Growls and Purrs" through her official social media channels. In the video, she said the shoot "used a vintage camera and playful compositions" to present a different side of herself.

== Credits and personnel ==
Credits adapted from Bugs.

- Jo Yuri – vocals, lyrics
- Gu-reum – lyrics, composition, arrangement

== Commercial performance ==
"Growls and Purrs" peaked at number 57 on the Korean Circle Download Chart.

== Release history ==
Release history for "Growls and Purrs"
Region	Date	Format	Label
Various	July 7, 2025	digital download; streaming	WakeOne; Genie Music; Stone Music
