= List of The Show Chart winners (2022) =

Winners of South Korean music program The Show

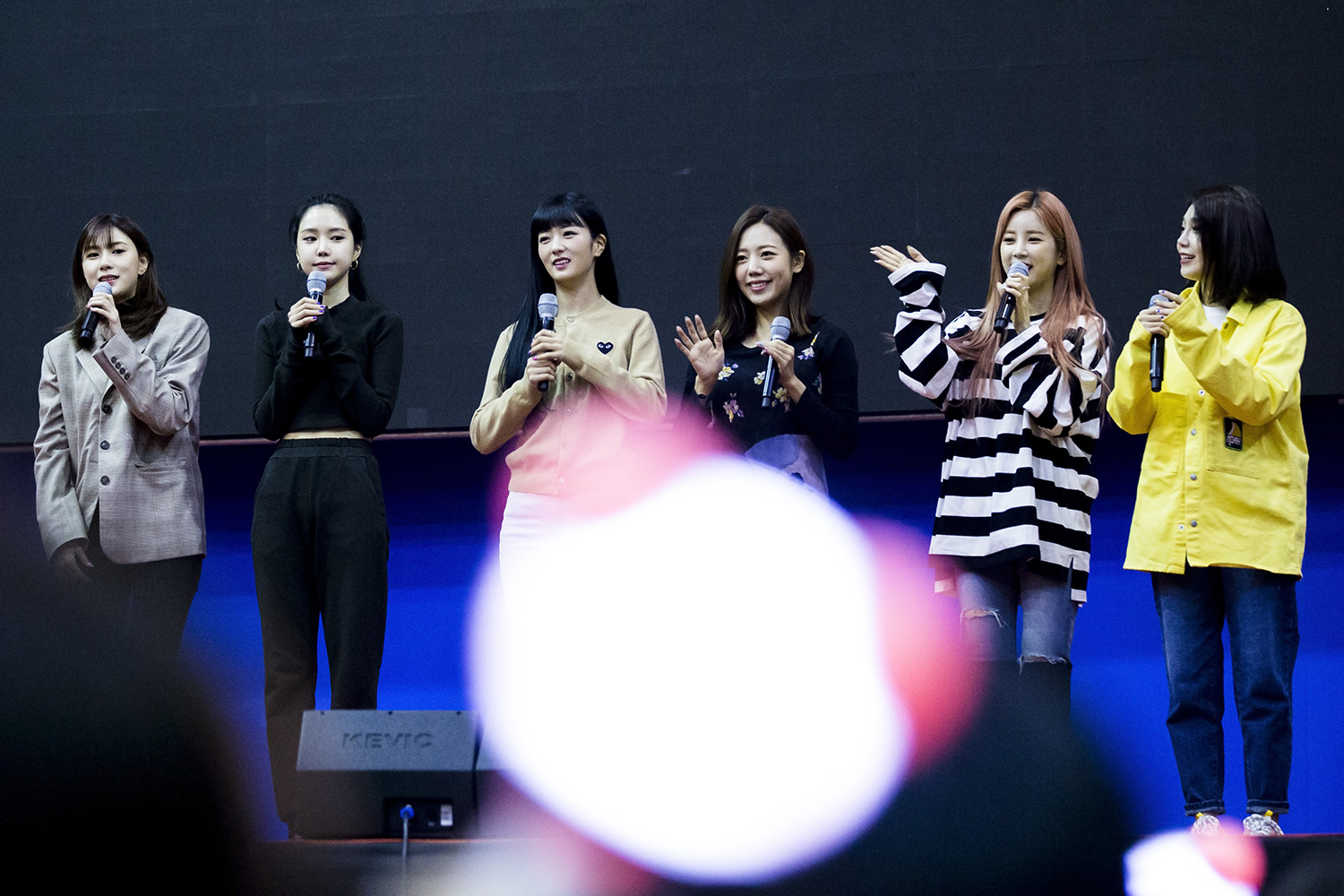
Apink's (pictured) win for "Dilemma" had the highest score of 2022, with 9,700 points at the February 22nd broadcast.

The Show Chart is a music program record chart on SBS M that gives an award to the best-performing single of the week in South Korea.

In 2022, 24 singles achieved number one on the chart, and 22 acts were awarded first-place trophies. "Dilemma" by Apink had the highest score of the year, with 9,700 points on the February 22 broadcast.

== Chart history ==
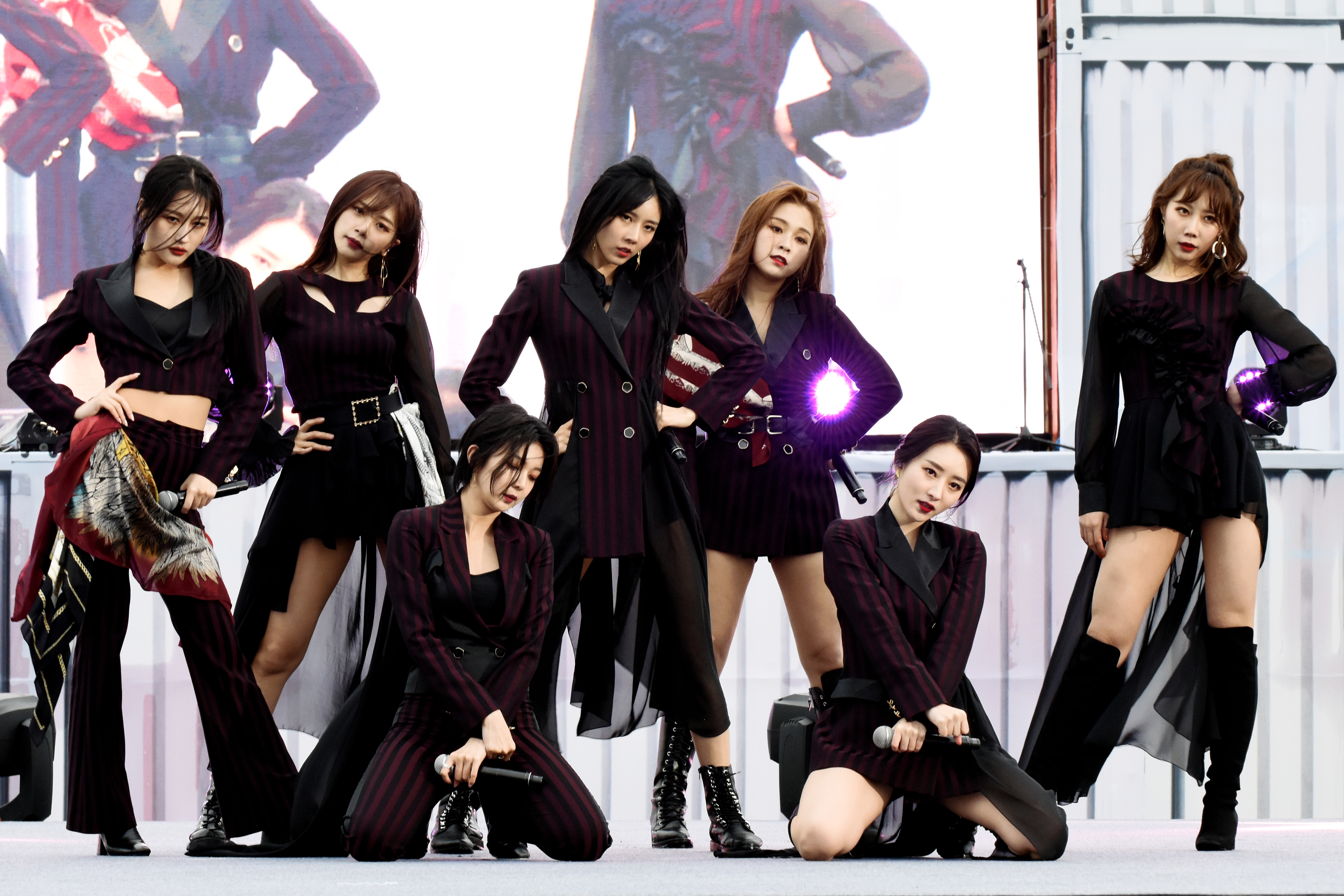
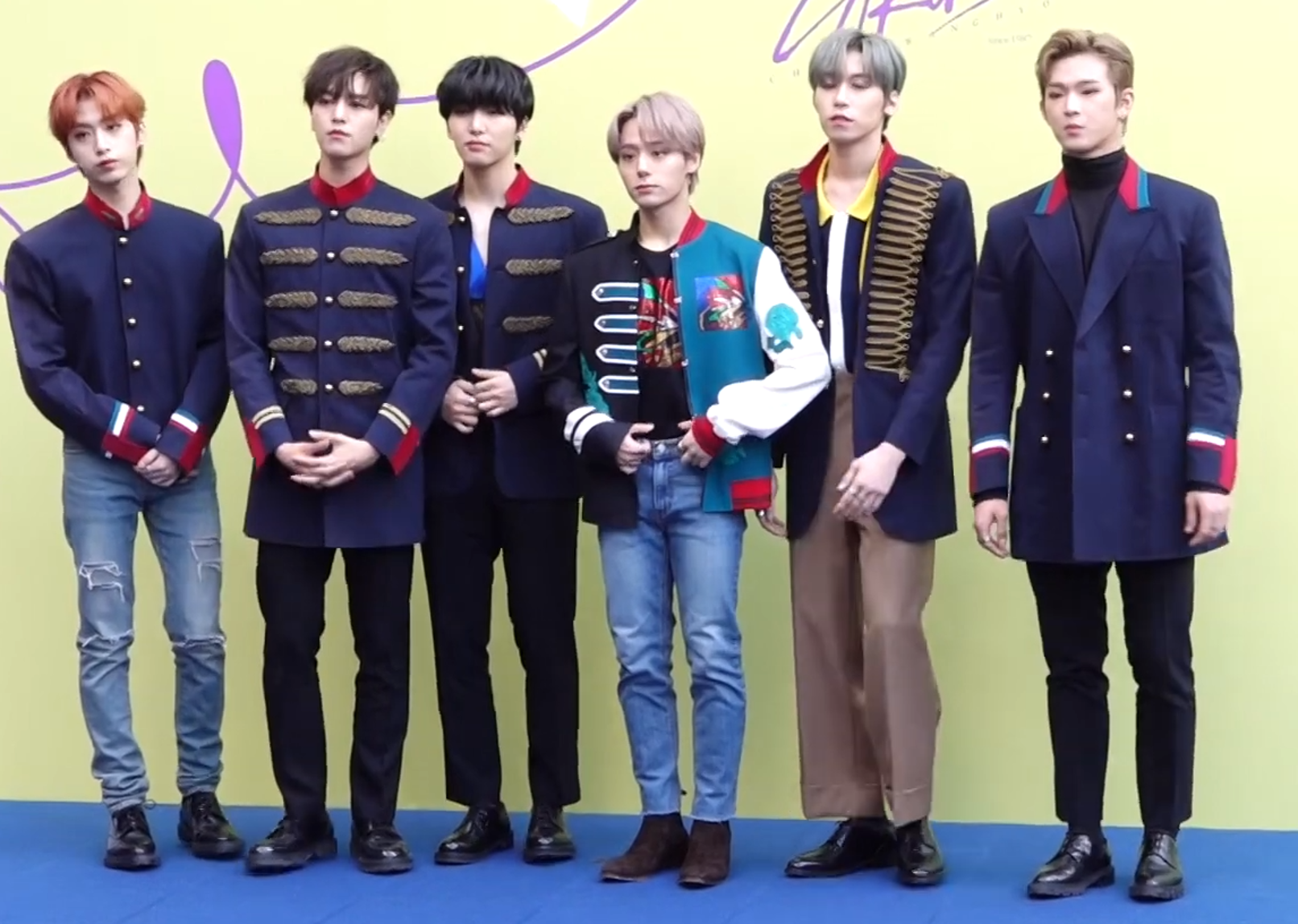
Dreamcatcher (top) and Oneus (bottom) won their first award on The Show with "Maison" and "Same Scent", respectively.
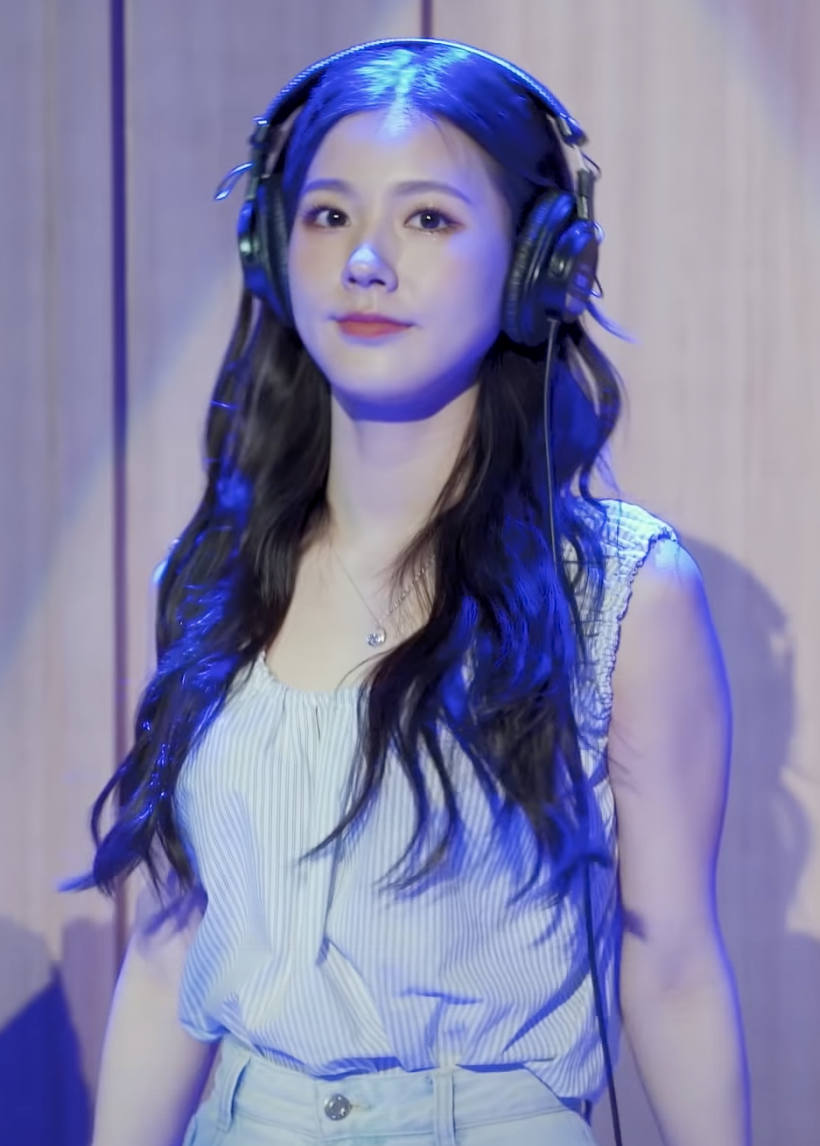
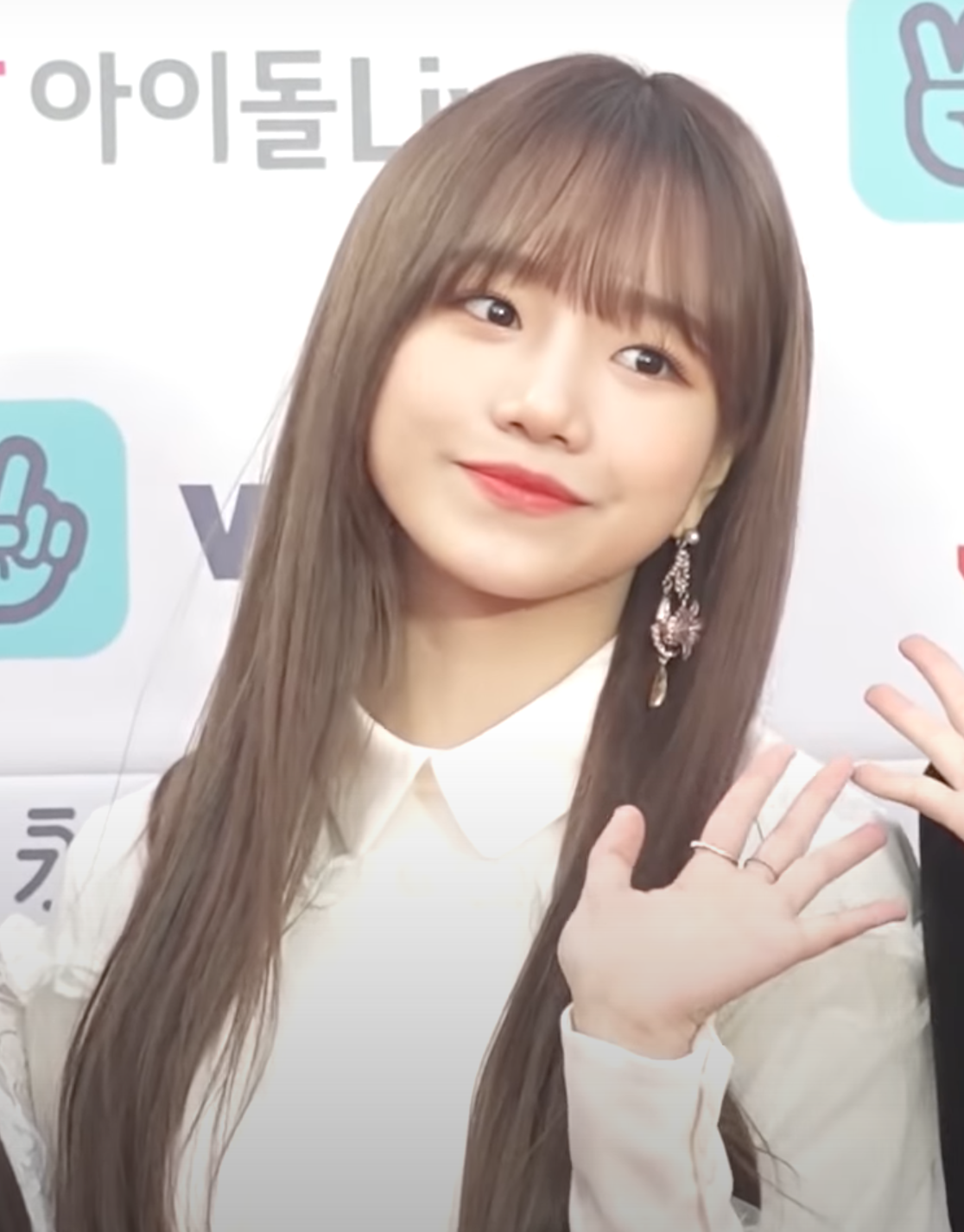
Miyeon of (G)I-dle (left) and Jo Yu-ri (right) received their first ever music show wins as soloists with "Drive" and "Love Shhh!", respectively.
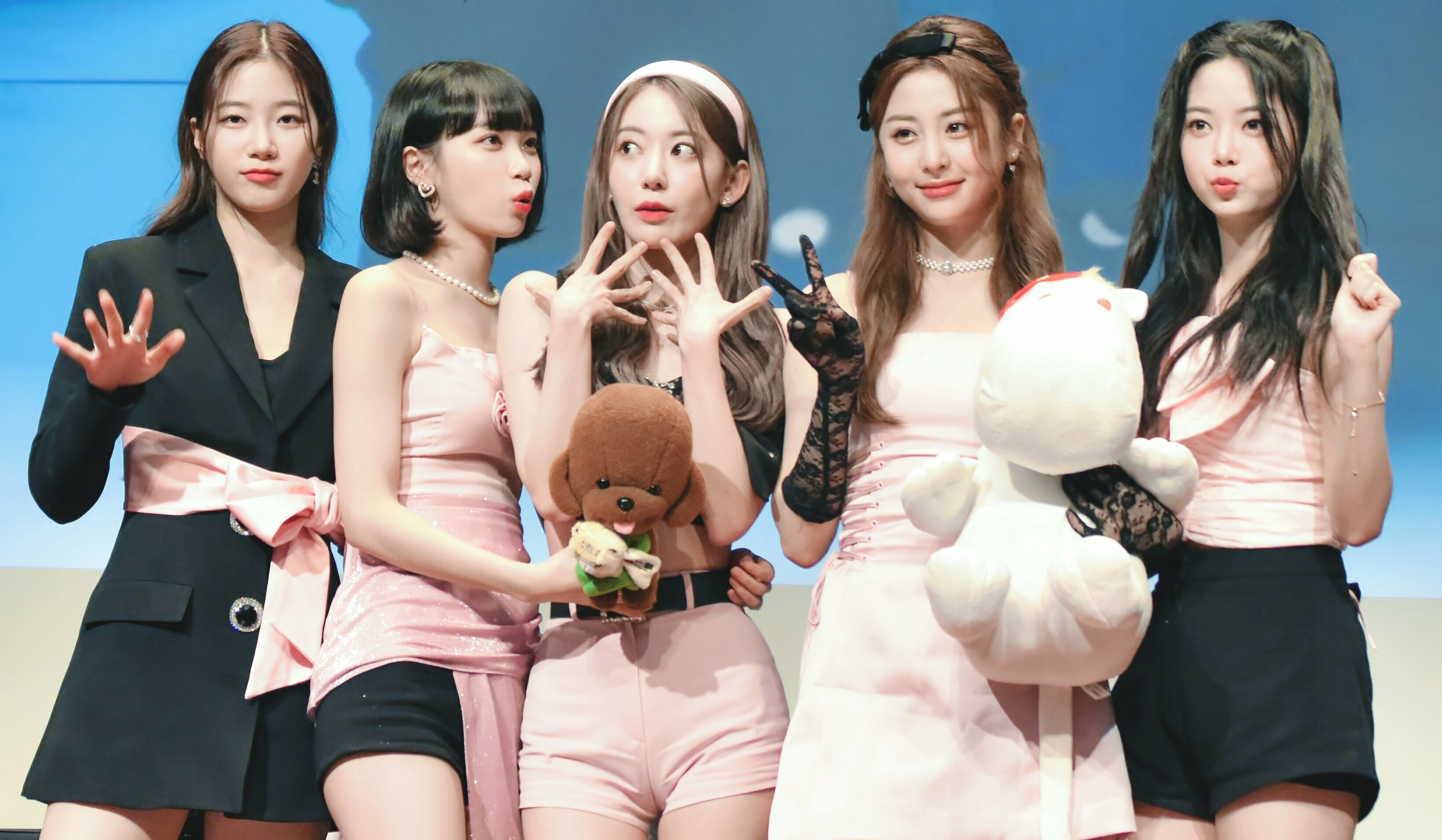
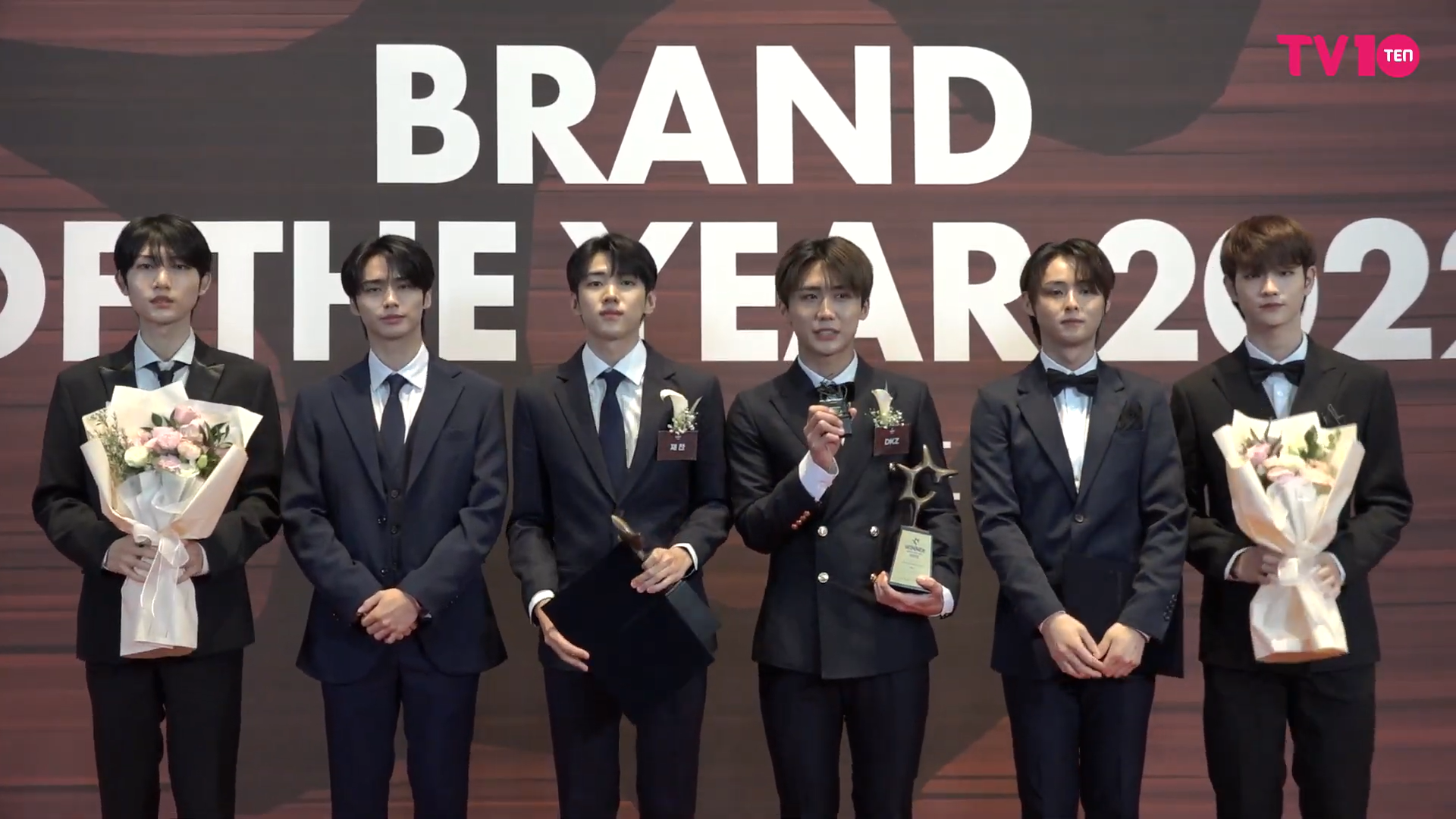
Le Sserafim (top) and DKZ (bottom) won their first ever music show trophies for "Fearless" and "Uh-Heung", respectively.

Key
	Triple Crown
	Highest score in 2022
—	No show was held

Episode	Date	Artist	Song	Points	Ref.
—	January 4	No Broadcast or Winner			
—	January 11	No Broadcast or Winner			
—	January 18	No Broadcast or Winner			
285	January 25	Fromis 9	"DM"	8,353	
—	February 1	No Broadcast or Winner			
—	February 8	No Broadcast or Winner			
—	February 15	No Broadcast or Winner			
286	February 22	Apink	"Dilemma"	9,700	
287	March 1	STAYC	"Run2U"	8,261	
288	March 8	STAYC	"Run2U"	7,669	
—	March 15	No Broadcast or Winner			
289	March 22	(G)I-dle	"Tomboy"	7,970	
290	March 29	Highlight	"Daydream"	8,650	
291	April 5	Oh My Girl	"Real Love"	8,881	
292	April 12	Ive	"Love Dive"	9,400	
293	April 19	Ive	"Love Dive"	8,184	
294	April 26	Dreamcatcher	"Maison"	7,914	
295	May 3	Miyeon	"Drive"	6,944	
296	May 10	Le Sserafim	"Fearless"	8,456	
297	May 17	Le Sserafim	"Fearless"	9,670	
298	May 24	Astro	"Candy Sugar Pop"	8,970	
—	May 31	No Broadcast or Winner			
299	June 7	Jo Yu-ri	"Love Shhh!"	6,489	
—	June 14	No Broadcast or Winner			
—	June 21	No Broadcast or Winner			
300	June 28	Loona	"Flip That"	8,200	
301	July 5	Fromis 9	"Stay This Way"	8,270	
302	July 12	Enhypen	"Future Perfect"	7,200	
303	July 19	Chungha	"Sparkling"	6,984	
304	July 26	STAYC	"Beautiful Monster"	8,369	
305	August 2	Ateez	"Guerrilla"	7,200	
306	August 9	Ateez	"Guerrilla"	8,640	
—	August 16	No Broadcast or Winner			
—	August 23	No Broadcast or Winner			
307	August 30	Ive	"After Like"	8,734	
308	September 6	Ive	"After Like"	7,403	
309	September 13	Oneus	"Same Scent"	7,950	
310	September 20	Oneus	"Same Scent"	9,370	
—	September 27	No Broadcast or Winner			
311	October 4	Cravity	"Party Rock"	9,110	
—	October 11	No Broadcast or Winner			
312	October 18	DKZ	"Uh-Heung"	8,530	
313	October 25	(G)I-dle	"Nxde"	8,551	
—	November 1	No Broadcast or Winner			
—	November 8	No Broadcast or Winner			
314	November 15	Highlight	"Alone"	9,170	
315	November 22	YooA	"Selfish"	7,227	
—	November 29	No Broadcast or Winner			
—	December 6	No Broadcast or Winner			
—	December 13	No Broadcast or Winner			
—	December 20	No Broadcast or Winner			
—	December 27	No Broadcast or Winner			
