= Farewell for Now! =

"Farewell for now!"

Single by Jo Yuri

from the EP Episode 25
- Language: Korean
- Released: July 14, 2025
- Genre: K-pop; Pop rock
- Length: 3:27
- Label: WakeOne; Genie Music; Stone Music
- Composers: Kim Jae-woong; Shin Geon-woo; Lee Seung-yoon; Park Moon-chi; Deulrejang
- Lyricists: Ogi (Galactika *); Underscore; Deeno; Llano; Ian; Lee Aeng-doo; Jo Yuri; Lee Si-dae; Park Han-pyeong; Mia

Jo Yuri singles chronology
"Growls and Purrs" (2025)	"Farewell for now!" (2025)

Music video
- "Farewell for now!" on YouTube

"Farewell for now!" (Korean: 이제 안녕; RR: Ije annyeong) is a song recorded by South Korean singer Jo Yuri for her third extended play Episode 25. It was released as the EP's lead single by WakeOne on July 14, 2025.

== Background and release ==
On June 25, 2025, WakeOne announced that Jo Yuri would release her third extended play Episode 25 on July 14. It would be her first album release in about two years since Love All in August 2023. On June 29, the scheduler and track list for the EP were released, confirming "Farewell for now!" as the title track alongside the pre-release single "Growls and Purrs". The song was released with the extended play on July 14.

== Composition ==
"Farewell for now!" was written by Ogi (Galactika *), Underscore, Deeno, Llano, Ian, Lee Aeng-doo, Jo Yuri, Lee Si-dae, Park Han-pyeong, and Mia, and composed by Kim Jae-woong, Shin Geon-woo, Lee Seung-yoon, Park Moon-chi, and Deulrejang. It was arranged by Park Moon-chi. The song was characterized as a pop rock song featuring band instrumentation and Jo's clear vocals, with lyrics expressing memories and the moment of farewell. Jo said the song was about emotional flow within a gradually distancing relationship.

== Promotion ==
Following the release of Episode 25, Jo Yuri performed "Farewell for now!" for the first time on a music program on Mnet's M Countdown on July 17, 2025. She also performed the song on KBS's Music Bank on July 18, and on MBC's Show! Music Core on July 19. On July 22, Jo appeared on the YouTube program It's Live, where she performed a band live version of the song.

== Credits and personnel ==
Credits adapted from Bugs.

Personnel

- Jo Yuri – vocals, lyrics
- Ogi (Galactika *) – lyrics
- Underscore – lyrics
- Deeno – lyrics
- Llano – lyrics
- Ian – lyrics
- Lee Aeng-doo – lyrics
- Lee Si-dae – lyrics
- Park Han-pyeong – lyrics
- Mia – lyrics
- Kim Jae-woong – composition
- Shin Geon-woo – composition
- Lee Seung-yoon – composition
- Park Moon-chi – composition, arrangement
- Deulrejang – composition

== Release history ==
Release history for "Farewell for now!"
Region	Date	Format	Label
Various	July 14, 2025	Digital download; streaming	WakeOne; Genie Music; Stone Music
