= List of The Show Chart winners (2023) =

Winners of South Korean music program The Show

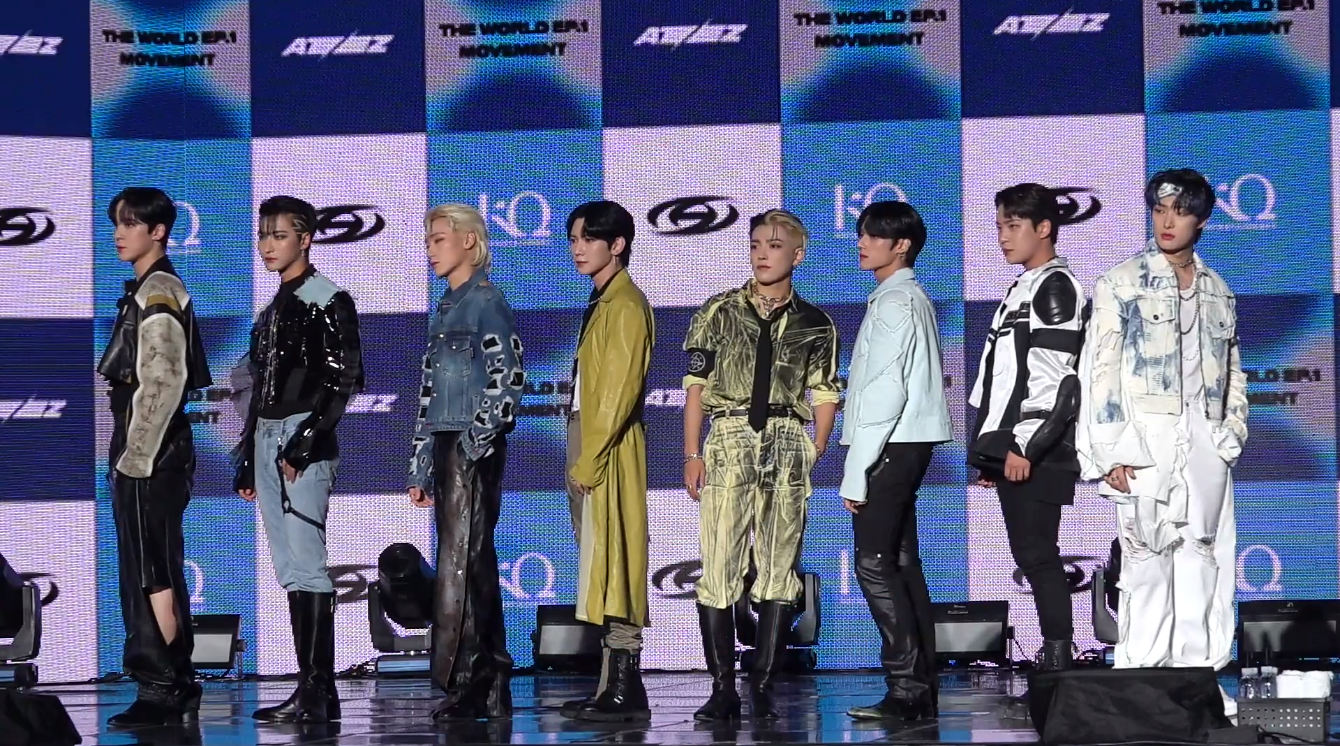
Ateez's (pictured) win for "Bouncy (K-Hot Chilli Peppers)" had the highest score of the year, with 9,590 points on the June 27 broadcast.

The Show Chart is a music program record chart on SBS M that gives an award to the best-performing single of the week in South Korea.

In 2023, 24 singles achieved number one on the chart, and 22 acts were awarded a first-place trophy. "Bouncy (K-Hot Chilli Peppers)" by Ateez had the highest score of the year, with 9,590 points on the June 27 broadcast.

== Chart history ==
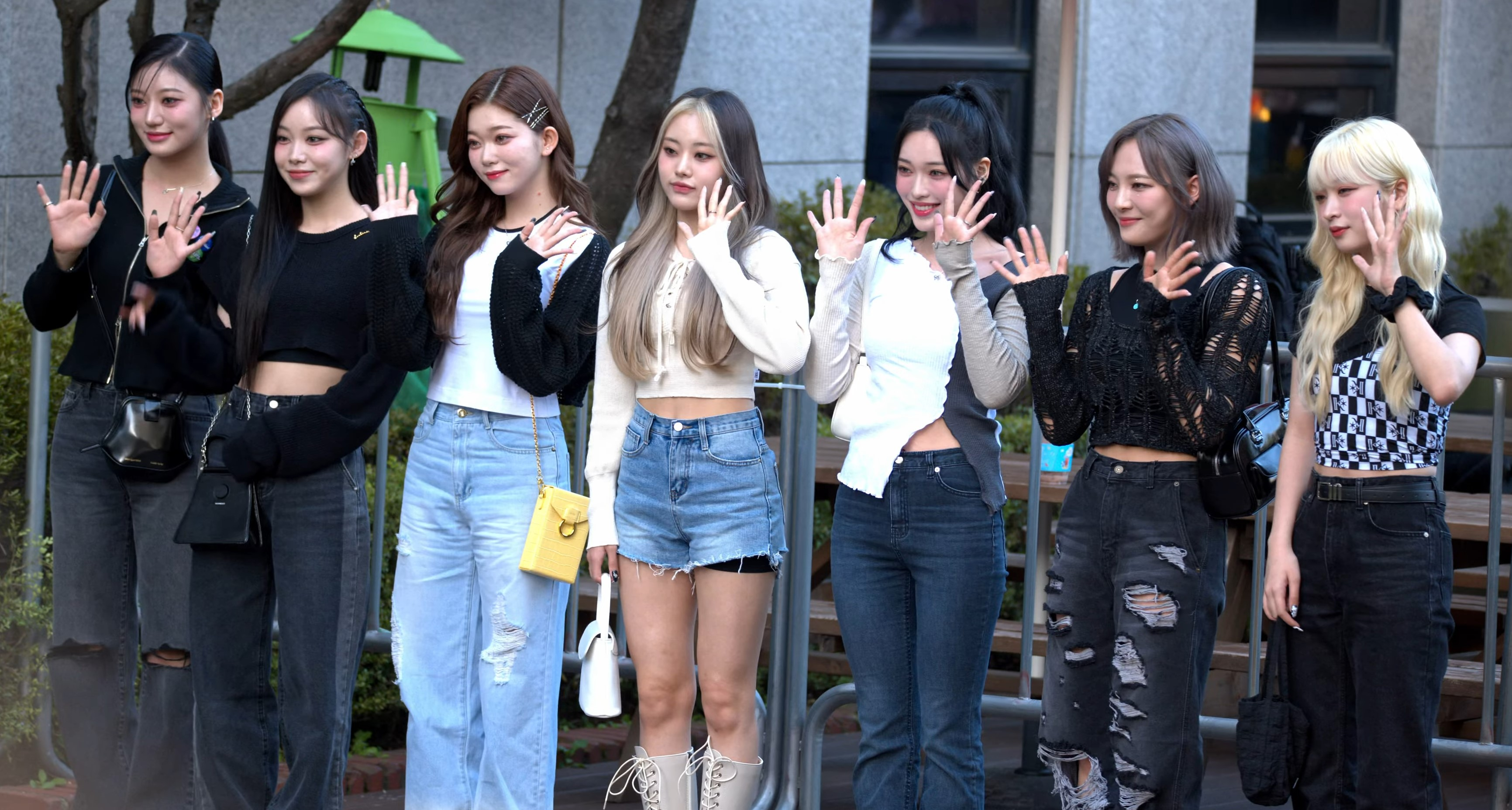
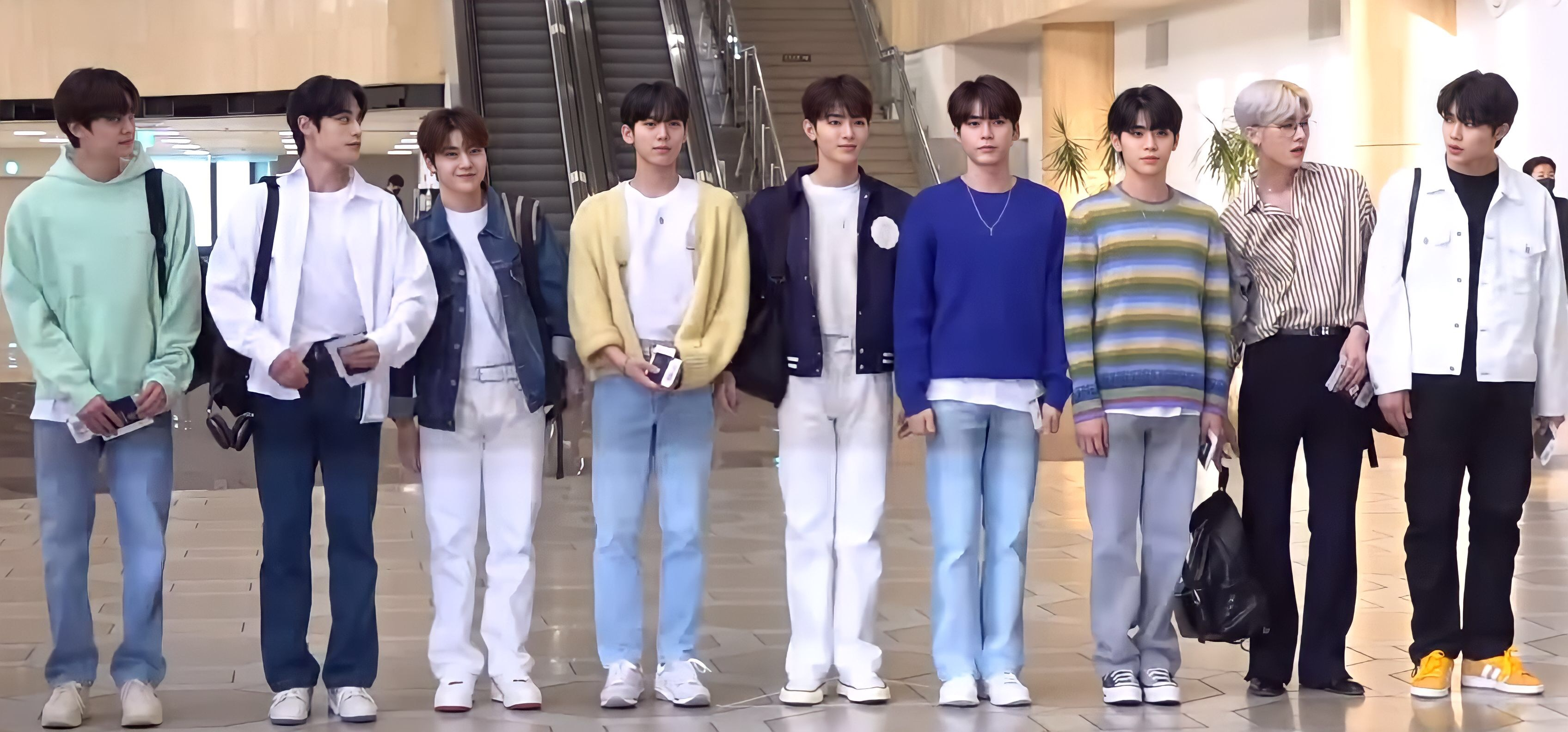
Billlie (top) and Zerobaseone (bottom) received their first ever music show win with "Eunoia" and "In Bloom" at The Show.
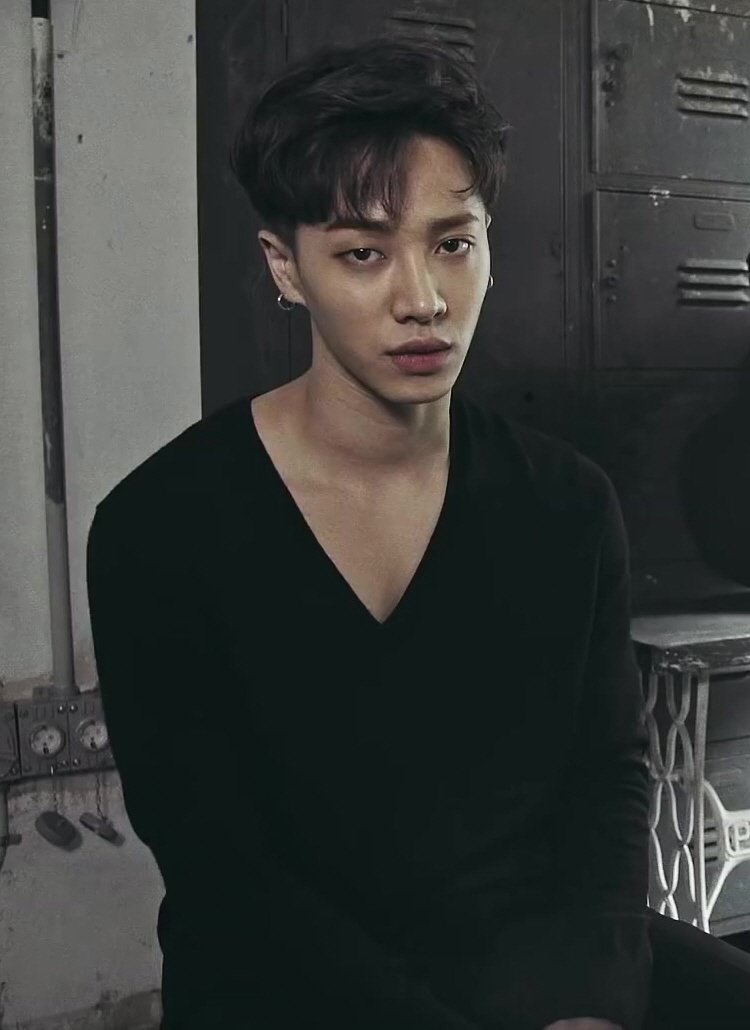
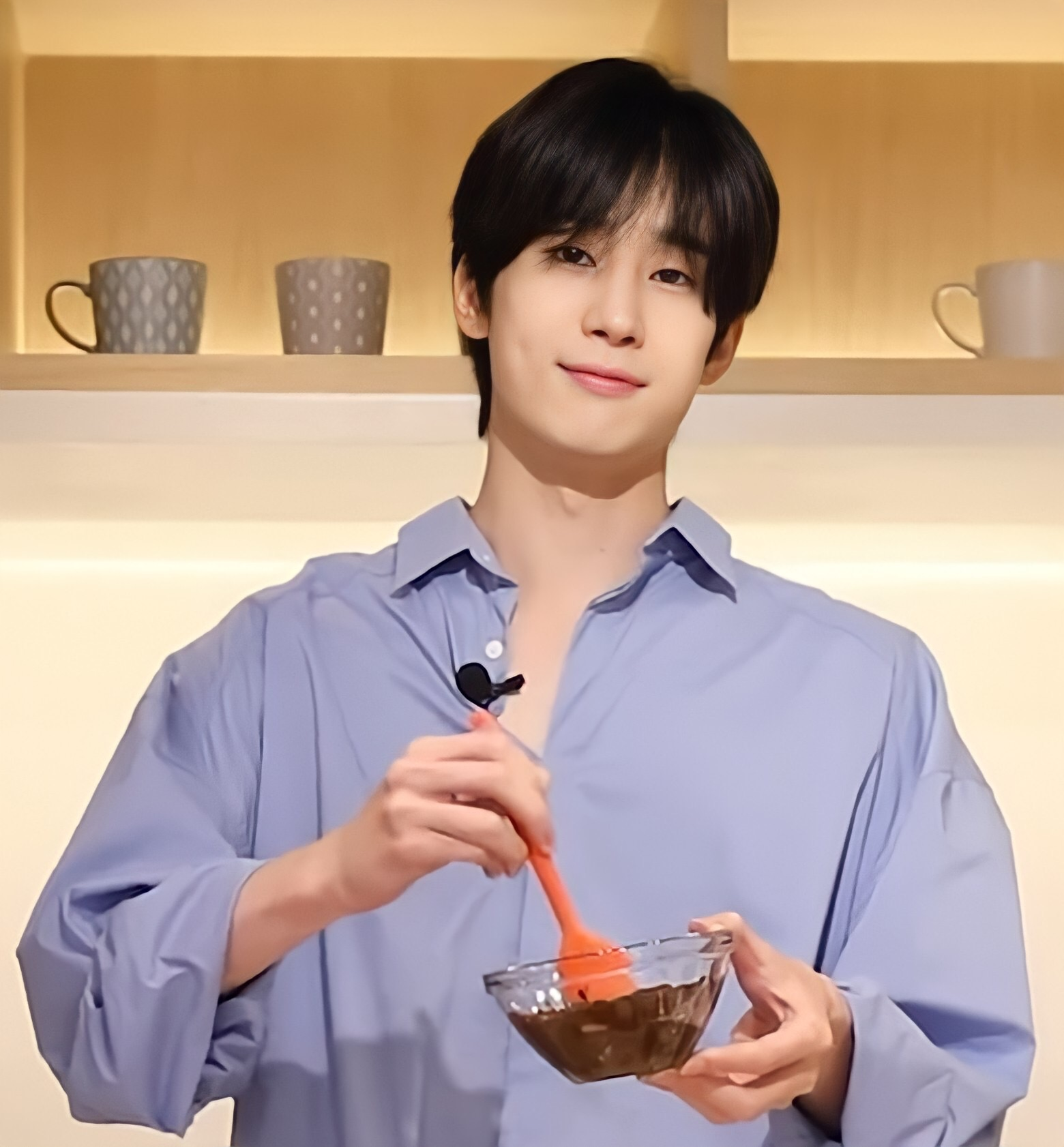
Lee Gi-kwang of Highlight (left) and Han Seung-woo of Victon (right) received their first-ever music show wins as soloists with "Predator" and "Dive Into", respectively.
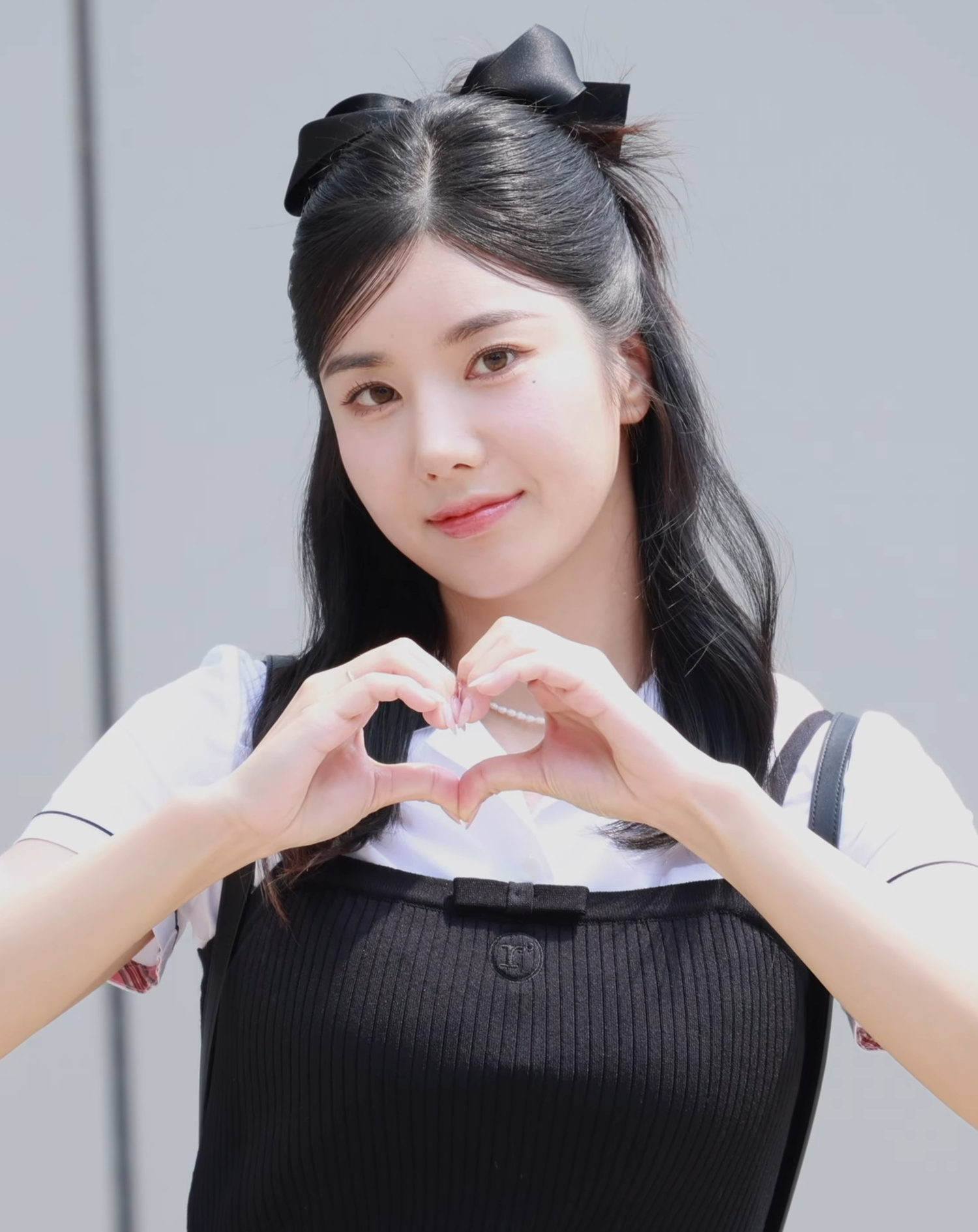
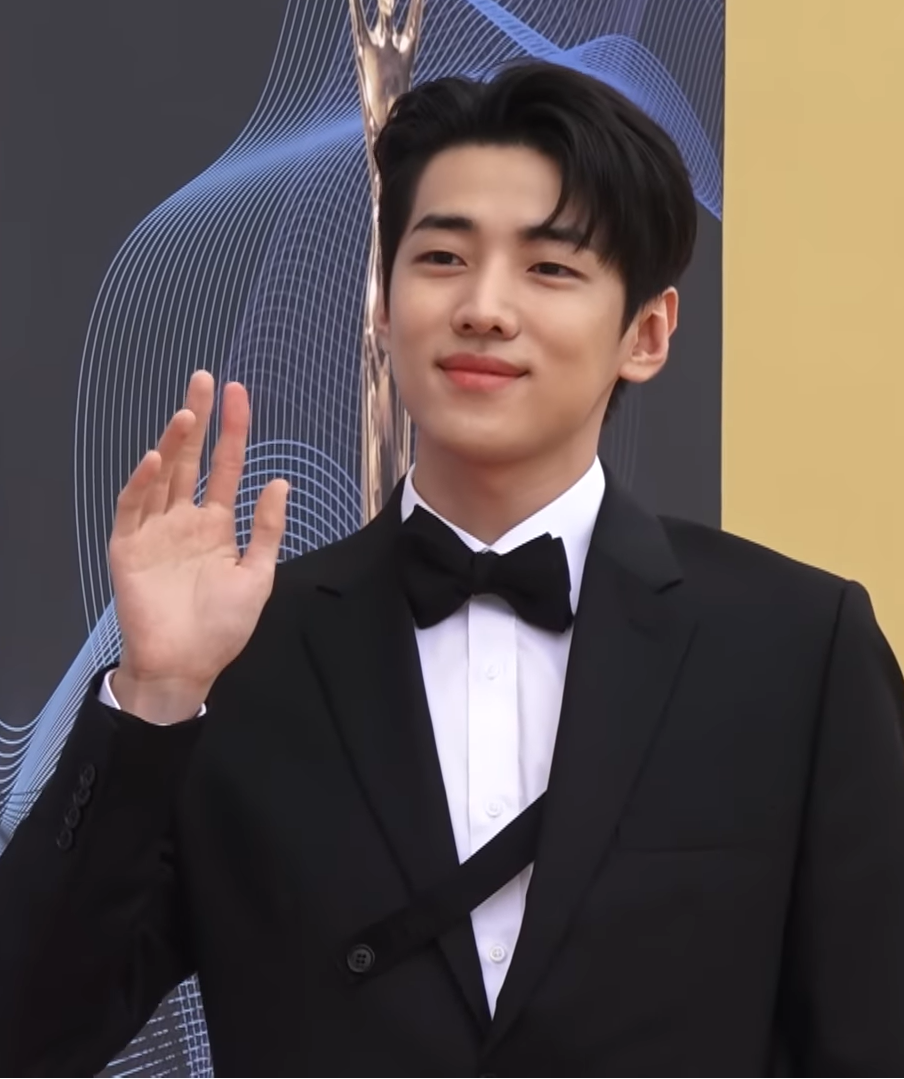
Soloists Kwon Eun-bi (left) and Park Jae-chan of DKZ (right) received their first-ever solo music show awards for "The Flash" and "Hello", respectively, on The Show.

Key
	Triple Crown
	Highest score in 2023
—	No show was held

Episode	Date	Artist	Song	Points	Ref.
—	January 3	No Broadcast or Winner			
—	January 10	No Broadcast or Winner			
—	January 17	No Broadcast or Winner			
—	January 24	No Broadcast or Winner			
—	January 31	No Broadcast or Winner			
—	February 7	No Broadcast or Winner			
—	February 14	No Broadcast or Winner			
316	February 21	STAYC	"Teddy Bear"	9,360	
317	February 28	Lee Chan-won	"Wish Lanterns"	7,310	
—	March 7	No Broadcast or Winner			
318	March 14	Cravity	"Groovy"	8,550	
319	March 21	Special episode, winner not announced			
320	March 28	Kim Jae-hwan	"Spring Breeze"	8,830	
321	April 4	Billlie	"Eunoia"	9,260	
—	April 11	No broadcast or winner			
322	April 18	Ive	"I Am"	7,454	
323	April 25	Lee Gi-kwang	"Predator"	8,021	
—	May 2	No broadcast or winner			
324	May 9	Le Sserafim	"Unforgiven"	9,340	
325	May 16	Oneus	"Erase Me"	6,690	
326	May 23	(G)I-dle	"Queencard"	8,157	
327	May 30	Dreamcatcher	"Bon Voyage"	9,030	
328	June 6	AB6IX	"Loser"	8,300	
329	June 13	Fromis 9	"#menow"	8,700	
330	June 20	Ateez	"Bouncy (K-Hot Chilli Peppers)"	7,220	
331	June 27	Ateez	"Bouncy (K-Hot Chilli Peppers)"	9,590	
332	July 4	Han Seung-woo	"Dive Into"	7,390	
—	July 11	No broadcast or winner			
333	July 18	Zerobaseone	"In Bloom"	9,350	
334	July 25	Zerobaseone	"In Bloom"	8,480	
335	August 1	Oh My Girl	"Summer Comes"	9,260	
336	August 8	Kwon Eunbi	"The Flash"	6,960	
337	August 15	Jo Yu-ri	"Taxi"	7,173	
—	August 22	No broadcast or winner			
338	August 29	STAYC	"Bubble"	7,285	
339	September 5	H1-Key	"Seoul (Such a Beautiful City)"	6,082	
340	September 12	BoyNextDoor	"But Sometimes"	9,080	
341	September 19	Park Jae-chan	"Hello"	7,180	
—	September 26	No broadcast or winner			
—	October 3	No broadcast or winner			
342	October 10	Oneus	"Baila Conmigo"	8,710	
—	October 17	No broadcast or winner			
—	October 24	No broadcast or winner			
—	October 31	No broadcast or winner			
—	November 7	No broadcast or winner			
—	November 14	No broadcast or winner			
—	November 21	No broadcast or winner			
—	November 28	No broadcast or winner			
—	December 5	No broadcast or winner			
—	December 12	No broadcast or winner			
—	December 19	No broadcast or winner			
—	December 26	No broadcast or winner			
