= Loveable =

Loveable or Lovable may refer to:

== Music ==
- "Loveable", a 1958 song recorded by Jill Corey
- "Loveable", a song by Gwen Stefani from the 2016 album This Is What the Truth Feels Like
- "Loveable", a song by Jo Yu-ri from the 2022 single album Op.22 Y-Waltz: in Minor
- "Loveable (From Your Head To Your Toes)", a 2003 song by Kenny Lattimore and Chante Moore
- "Lovable", a song by Elvis Costello from the 1986 album King of America

== Other uses ==
- Lovable (company), vibe coding platform
- Loveable (film), a 2024 Norwegian film by Lilja Ingolfsdottir
