= Horn (album) =

- Digital cover

Studio album by Apink
- Released: February 14, 2022
- Genre: K-pop
- Length: 37:22
- Language: Korean
- Label: IST; Kakao

Apink chronology
Look (2020)	Horn (2022)	Self (2023)

Singles from Horn
- 1. "Thank You" Released: April 19, 2021; 2. "Dilemma" Released: February 14, 2022

Professional ratings
Review scores
Source	Rating
IZM	3.5/5 stars

Horn is the fourth Korean studio album and seventh overall by South Korean girl group Apink. Marketed as "special album", it contains eleven tracks, including the 2021 single "Thank You" and the lead single "Dilemma". The album was released by IST Entertainment on February 14, 2022. It was the group's last album to feature group member Naeun, who withdrew from the group on April 8, 2022.

== Background and release ==
On December 22, 2021, IST Entertainment announced Apink would be releasing a new album in February 2022. On January 18, 2022, it was announced by YG Entertainment member Son Na-eun would not be participating in the album promotional activities with exception of filming for the album jacket and music video due "to difficulties in coordinating the schedule for her next project under discussion". On January 22, it was announced that Apink would be releasing Horn on February 14. The album was marketed as "special album" by IST Entertainment. Four days later, the track listing consisting of 11 tracks including previously released single "Thank You" and lead single "Dilemma" was released. On February 7, the highlight medley teaser video was released. The music video for "Dilemma" was released on February 11 and 13.

== Commercial performance ==
Horn debuted at number four on South Korea's Gaon Album Chart in the chart issue dated February 13–19, 2022; on the monthly chart, the album debuted at number nine in the chart issue for February 2022 with 49,598 copies sold.

== Promotion ==
Following the release of the album, Apink held a live showcase on YouTube to introduce the album and communicate with their fans. The group then performed "Dilemma", "Nothing", and "Red Carpet" on Mnet's M Countdown on February 17.

== Track listing ==
Track listing for Horn
No.	Title	Lyrics	Music	Arrangement	Length
1.	"Dilemma"	B.E.P; Jeon Goon	B.E.P; Jeon Goon	Rado	3:29
2.	"Holy Moly"	Kenzie; Son Na-eun	Kenzie	Kenzie	3:02
3.	"My oh My"	Hae Da-yeong; Oh Yu-won	Ryan S. Jhun; Harold Philippon; Lauren Dyson	Alawn	3:06
4.	"Nothing" (Sung by Park Cho-rong, Jung Eun-ji, and Kim Nam-joo)	Kim Jin (MUMW); Hyeon Ji-won (PNP); Go Hyeon-jeong (MUMW); Lee Shin-young (MUMW); Eunpa (MUMW)	Fredrik Boström; Louise Frick Sveen; Albin Nordqvist	Albin Nordqvist	3:37
5.	"Red Carpet" (Sung by Yoon Bo-mi, Son Na-eun, and Oh Ha-young)	Kim Yeon-seo	Daniel Mikael Caesar; Ludwig Axel Lindell; Kim Yeon-seo; Gabriel Brandes	Daniel Mikael Caesar; Ludwig Axel Lindell	3:05
6.	"Single Rider"	Kim Jin-hwan	Kim Jin-hwan	Kim Jin-hwan	3:23
7.	"Free & Love"	Park Cho-rong	Justin Reinstein; JJean	Justin Reinstein	3:28
8.	"Just Like This" (Korean: 그날의 봄; RR: Geunal-ui bom; lit. The Spring of that Day)	Kim Nam-joo	KZ; Kim Tae-young; B.O.	KZ; Kim Tae-young	3:30
9.	"Trip"	Oh Ha-young; Zigzag Note; Kang Myeong-sin; No Eun-jong	Zigzag Note; Kang Myeong-sin; No Eun-jong	Zigzag Note; Kang Myeong-sin; No Eun-jong	3:33
10.	"Dream" (Korean: 작은 별; RR: Jag-eun byeol; lit. Starlet)	Jeong Eun-ji	Lee Hyun-young; Jay Park; Jeong Eun-ji	Lee Hyun-young; Jay Park	3:09
11.	"Thank You" (Korean: 고마워; RR: Gomawo; lit. Thanks)	Yoon Bo-mi; Duble Sidekick; Yoo Tae-un	Duble Sidekick; Yoo Tae-eun; De view	Duble Sidekick; De view; EastWest; SiO2	4:00
Total length:					37:22

Notes

- "Holy Moly" is stylized in all caps.

== Charts ==
=== Weekly charts ===
Weekly chart performance for Horn
Chart (2022)	Peak position
South Korean Albums (Gaon)	4

=== Monthly charts ===
Monthly chart performance for Horn
Chart (2022)	Peak position
South Korean Albums (Gaon)	9

== Release history ==
Release history for Horn
Region	Date	Format	Label
South Korea	February 14, 2022	CD	IST; Kakao
Various	February 14, 2022	Digital download; streaming	IST; Kakao
