= Love Shhh! =

Single by Jo Yu-ri

from the EP Op.22 Y-Waltz: in Major
- Language: Korean
- Released: June 2, 2022
- Genre: Dance-pop; pop rock
- Length: 3:19
- Label: Wake One; Stone Music
- Composers: The Proof; Moa 'Cazzi Opeia' Carlebecker; Albin Nordqvist; Maria Marcus
- Lyricists: Danke (Lalala Studio); Jo Yoon-kyung

Jo Yu-ri singles chronology
"Glassy" (2021)	"Love Shhh!" (2022)	"Loveable" (2022)

Music video
- "Love Shhh!" on YouTube

"Love Shhh!" (Korean: 러브 쉿!) is a song recorded by South Korean singer Jo Yu-ri for her first extended play Op.22 Y-Waltz: in Major. It was released as the EP's lead single by Wake One Entertainment on June 2, 2022.

== Background and release ==
On May 17, Wake One Entertainment announced Jo Yu-ri would be releasing her first extended play titled Op.22 Y-Waltz: in Major in June 2022. A day later, it was announced that Op.22 Y-Waltz: in Major would be released in June 2 with "Love Shhh!" as the lead single. On May 30, a highlight medley teaser video was released. The music video teaser was also released on the same day. "Love Shhh!" was released alongside the EP and its music video on June 2.

== Composition ==
"Love Shhh!" was written by Danke (Lalala Studio) alongside Jo Yoon-kyung, composed by The Proof, Moa 'Cazzi Opeia' Carlebecker, Albin Nordqvist, and Maria Marcus, and arranged by The Proof. It was described as a up-tempo dance-pop song with "cheerful mood suitable for the summer season". "Love Shhh!" was composed in the key of A major with a tempo of 118 beats per minute.

== Commercial performance ==
"Love Shhh!" debuted at number 110 on South Korea's Gaon Digital Chart in the chart issue dated June 5–11, 2022, ascending to number 97 in the chart issue dated June 19–25, 2022. On its component charts, it debuted at number ten on the Gaon Download Chart, and number 61 on the Gaon BGM Chart in the chart issue dated May 29 – June 4, 2022. It also debuted at number 132 on the component Gaon Streaming Chart in the chart issue dated June 5–11, 2022, ascending to number 99 in the chart issue dated June 19–25, 2022. On the Billboard South Korea Songs, the song debuted at number 16 in the chart issue dated July 2, 2022.

== Promotion ==
Prior to the extended play's release, Jo Yu-ri held a live event on the same day to introduce the EP and its songs, including "Love Shhh!", and communicate with her fans. She subsequently performed on three music programs in the first week: KBS's Music Bank on June 3, MBC's Show! Music Core on June 4, and SBS's inkigayo on June 5. On the second week, she performed on four music programs: SBS M's The Show on June 7 where she won first place, MBC M's Show Champion on June 8, Music Bank on June 10, Show! Music Core on June 11, and Inkigayo on June 12. On the final week of promotion, she performed on four music programs: Show Champion on June 15, Mnet's M Countdown on June 16, Music Bank on June 17, and Inkigayo on June 19.

== Charts ==
=== Weekly charts ===
Weekly chart performance for "Love Shhh!"
Chart (2022)	Peak position
South Korea (Gaon)	97
South Korea (Billboard)	16

=== Monthly charts ===
Monthly chart performance for "Love Shhh!"
Chart (2022)	Peak position
South Korea (Circle)	103

== Accolades ==
Music program awards for "Love Shhh!"
Program	Date	Ref.
The Show	June 7, 2022	

== Release history ==
Release history for "Love Shhh!"
Region	Date	Format	Label
Various	June 2, 2022	Digital download; streaming	Wake One; Stone Music

== See also ==
- List of The Show Chart winners (2022)
