= Op.22 Y-Waltz: in Major =

- Digital cover

EP by Jo Yu-ri
- Released: June 2, 2022
- Genre: K-pop
- Length: 14:51
- Language: Korean
- Label: Wake One; Stone Music

Jo Yu-ri chronology
Glassy (2021)	Op.22 Y-Waltz: in Major (2022)	Op.22 Y-Waltz: in Minor (2022)

Singles from Op.22 Y-Waltz: in Major
- 1. "Love Shhh!" Released: June 2, 2022

Op.22 Y-Waltz: in Major is the first extended play by South Korean singer Jo Yu-ri. The EP was released by Wake One Entertainment on June 2, 2022, and contains five tracks, including the lead single "Love Shhh!".

== Background and release ==
On May 17, Wake One Entertainment announced Jo Yu-ri would be releasing her first extended play titled Op.22 Y-Waltz: in Major in June 2022. A day later, it was announced that Op.22 Y-Waltz: in Major would be released in June 2 with "Love Shhh!" as the lead single. On May 24, the track listing was released. On May 30, a highlight medley teaser video was released. The music video teaser for "Love Shhh!" was also released on the same day. The EP alongside the music video for "Love Shhh!" was released on June 2.

== Commercial performance ==
Op.22 Y-Waltz: in Major debuted at number five on South Korea's Gaon Album Chart in the chart issue dated May 29 – June 4, 2022.

== Promotion ==
Prior to the extended play's release, on June 2, 2022, Jo Yu-ri held a live event to introduce the EP and communicate with her fans.

== Track listing ==
Track listing for Op.22 Y-Waltz: in Major
No.	Title	Lyrics	Music	Arrangement	Length
1.	"Round and Around"	Yejune Synn (Snnny); Deeno; Hero	Yejune Synn (Snnny); Deeno	Yejune Synn (Snnny)	1:19
2.	"Love Shhh!" (러브 쉿!)	Danke (Lalala Studio); Jo Yoon-kyung	The Proof; Moa 'Cazzi Opeia' Carlebecker; Albin Nordqvist; Maria Marcus	The Proof	3:19
3.	"Rolla Skates"	Danke (Lalala Studio); Jisoo Park (153/Joombas)	Johan Gustafsson; Oneye; Laurell Barker; Frazer Mac	Johan Gustafsson; Oneye	2:59
4.	"This Time"	Park Woo-sang	Park Woo-sang	Park Woo-sang	3:45
5.	"Opening"	Jo Yu-ri; Strawberrybananaclub	Jo Yu-ri; Strawberrybananaclub	Strawberrybananaclub	3:29
Total length:					14:51

== Charts ==
=== Weekly charts ===
Weekly chart performance for Op.22 Y-Waltz: in Major
Chart (2022)	Peak position
Japanese Albums (Oricon)	27
South Korean Albums (Gaon)	5

=== Monthly charts ===
Monthly chart performance for Op.22 Y-Waltz: in Major
Chart (2022)	Peak position
South Korean Albums (Circle)	11

== Release history ==
Release history for Op.22 Y-Waltz: in Major
Region	Date	Format	Label
South Korea	June 2, 2022	CD	Wake One; Stone Music
Various	June 2, 2022	Digital download; streaming	Wake One; Stone Music
