= Glassy (song) =

Single by Jo Yu-ri

from the album Glassy
- Language: Korean
- Released: October 7, 2021
- Genre: Dance-pop
- Length: 3:09
- Label: Wake One; Stone Music
- Composers: Park Woo-sang; Bottle Paik; Boran; Inner Child (MonoTree)
- Lyricist: Hwang Yu-bin

Jo Yu-ri singles chronology
| "Glassy" (2021) | "Love Shhh!" (2022) |

Music video
- "Glassy" on YouTube

"Glassy" is a song recorded by South Korean singer Jo Yu-ri for her debut single album of the same name. It was released as the album's lead single by Wake One Entertainment on October 7, 2021.

== Background and release ==
On September 24, 2021, Wake One Entertainment announced that Jo Yu-ri would be making her solo debut with single album titled Glassy on October 7. On October 1, the track listing was released with "Glassy" announced as the lead single. Two days later, the highlight medley video was released. The music video teaser was released on October 4 and 6. "Glassy" was released alongside the single album and its music video on October 7.

== Composition ==
"Glassy" was written by Hwang Yu-bin, composed and arranged by Park Woo-sang, Bottle Paik, and Boran alongside Inner Child (MonoTree) for the composition, and Minky for the arrangement. It was described as a dance-pop song with "lively and catchy melody" and characterized by Jo Yu-ri's "charming voice". "Glassy" was composed in the key of F-sharp major with a tempo of 125 beats per minute.

== Commercial performance ==
"Glassy" debuted at number 167 on South Korea's Gaon Digital Chart in the chart issue dated October 3–9, 2021, ascending to number 137 in the chart issue dated October 17–23, 2021. On its component charts, the song debuted at number 17 on the Gaon Download Chart, and number 145 on the Gaon BGM Chart in the chart issue dated October 3–9, 2021. It also debuted at number 169 on the component Gaon Streaming Chart in the chart issue dated October 10–16, 2021, ascending to number 146 in the chart issue dated October 24–30, 2021. On the Billboard K-pop Hot 100, the song debuted at number 100 in the chart issue dated October 30, 2021, ascending to number 84 in the following week.

== Promotion ==
Following the single album's release, Jo Yu-ri held a live event on the same day titled "Jo Yuri The 1st Single album [Glassy] Showcase" on Universe to introduce the single album and its songs, including "Glassy", and communicate with her fans. She subsequently performed on three music programs in the first week: KBS's Music Bank on October 8, MBC's Show! Music Core on October 9, and SBS's Inkigayo on October 10. On the second week, she performed on five music programs: SBS M's The Show on October 12, MBC M's Show Champion on October 13, Mnet's M Countdown on October 14, Music Bank on October 15, Show! Music Core on October 16, and Inkigayo on October 17. On the final week of promotion, she performed on four music programs: The Show on October 19, Show Champion on October 20, Music Bank on October 22, Show! Music Core on October 23, and Inkigayo on October 24.

== Credits and personnel ==
Credits adapted from Melon.

Studio

- 821 Sound Mastering – mastering

Personnel

- Jo Yu-ri – vocals, background vocals
- Hwang Yu-bin – lyrics
- Park Woo-sang – composition, arrangement, recording, mixing, synth, drums (track 1–2)
- Bottle Paik – composition, arrangement, synth, drums
- Boran – composition, arrangement, background vocals
- Inner Child (MonoTree) – composition
- Minky – arrangement, synth, drums
- Kwon Nam-woo – mastering
- Young – guitar

== Charts ==
=== Weekly charts ===
Weekly chart performance for "Glassy"
| Chart (2021) | Peak position |
|---|---|
| South Korea (Gaon) | 137 |
| South Korea (K-pop Hot 100) | 84 |

=== Monthly charts ===
Monthly chart performance for "Glassy"
| Chart (2021) | Peak position |
|---|---|
| South Korea (Gaon) | 149 |

== Release history ==
Release history for "Glassy"
| Region | Date | Format | Label |
|---|---|---|---|
| Various | October 7, 2021 | Digital download; streaming | Wake One; Stone Music |
