= Glassy (single album) =

- Digital cover

Single album by Jo Yu-ri
- Released: October 7, 2021
- Genre: K-pop
- Length: 10:12
- Language: Korean
- Label: Wake One; Stone Music

Jo Yu-ri chronology
Glassy (2021)	Op.22 Y-Waltz: in Major (2022)

Singles from Glassy
- 1. "Autumn Memories (가을 상자)" Released: September 23, 2021; 2. "Glassy" Released: October 7, 2021

Glassy is the debut single album by South Korean singer Jo Yu-ri. It consists of three tracks, including the lead single of the same name. The single album was released by Wake One Entertainment on October 7, 2021.

== Background and release ==
On September 24, Wake One Entertainment announced that Jo Yu-ri would be making her solo debut with single album titled Glassy on October 7. The photo teaser was released on September 27 and September 30. On October 1, the track listing was released with "Glassy" announced as the lead single. On October 3, the highlight medley video was released. On October 4, the music video teaser for lead single "Glassy" was released. On October 6, the second music video teaser for "Glassy" was released. The single album was released on October 7, along with the music video for "Glassy".

== Composition ==
"Glassy" was described as a dance-pop song with "lively and catchy melody" and characterized by Jo Yu-ri's "charming voice". "Express Moon" was described as a medium-tempo song with "impressive warm yet powerful instrumental tune" and "romantic melody". "Autumn Memories" (가을 상자) was described as an "emotional duet" ballad song.

== Promotion ==
Following the single album's release, Jo Yu-ri held a live event on the same day called "Jo Yuri The 1st Single album [Glassy] Showcase" on Universe to introduce the single album and communicate with her fans.

== Commercial performance ==
On October 5, Wake One Entertainment announced Glassy had more than 50,000 pre-order sales. The album debuted at number 7 on the Gaon Album Chart and moved to number 5 the following week.

== Track listing ==
Digital
No.	Title	Lyrics	Music	Arrangement	Length
1.	"Glassy"	Hwang Yu-bin	Park Woo-sang; Bottle Paik; Boran; Inner Child (MonoTree)	Park Woo-sang; Bottle Paik; Minky	3:09
2.	"Express Moon"	Honest	Kyum Lyk; Park Woo-sang; Hyezoo	Park Woo-sang; Kyum Lyk	3:05
Total length:					6:15

CD
No.	Title	Lyrics	Music	Arrangement	Length
3.	"Autumn Memories" (가을 상자; with Lee Seok-hoon)	Lee Joo-hyeong (MonoTree); Choo Dae-gwan (MonoTree); Kim Hae-ron (MonoTree); Kwon Ae-jin (MonoTree)	Lee Joo-hyeong (MonoTree); Choo Dae-gwan (MonoTree); Kim Hae-ron (MonoTree); Kwon Ae-jin (MonoTree)	Choo Dae-gwan (MonoTree)	3:58
Total length:					10:13

== Credits and personnel ==
Credits adapted from Melon.

Studio

- M Creative Sound Studio – recording (track 3)
- MonoTree Studio – recording (track 3)
- Seoul Studio – recording (track 3)
- 918 Studio – mixing (track 3)
- 821 Sound Mastering – mastering (track 1–3)

Personnel

- Jo Yu-ri – vocals, background vocals
- Hwang Yu-bin – lyrics (track 1)
- Honest – lyrics (track 2)
- Lee Joo-hyeong (MonoTree) – lyrics, composition (track 3)
- Choo Dae-gwan (MonoTree) – lyrics, composition, arrangement, vocal directing, bass, keyboard, string arrangement, string conducting (track 3)
- Kim Hae-ron (MonoTree) – lyrics, composition, background vocals (track 3)
- Kwon Ae-jin (MonoTree) – lyrics, composition, background vocals (track 3)
- Park Woo-sang – composition, arrangement, recording, mixing, synth, drums (track 1–2)
- Bottle Paik – composition, arrangement, synth, drums (track 1)
- Boran – composition, arrangement, background vocals (track 1)
- Inner Child (MonoTree) – composition (track 1)
- Minky – arrangement, synth, drums (track 1)
- Kyum Lyk – composition, arrangement (track 2)
- Hyezoo – composition, background vocals (track 2)
- Jang Min – recording (track 3)
- Kang Sun-young – recording (track 3)
- Jeong Gi-hong – recording (track 3)
- Choi Da-in – recording (track 3)
- Lee Joo-hyung – digital editing (track 3)
- Seo Dong-gwang – mixing (track 3)
- Kwon Nam-woo – mastering (track 1–3)
- Park Woo-sang – keyboard, bass (track 2)
- Young – guitar (track 1)
- Kim Jin-kyu – guitar (track 2)
- Jeog Jae – guitar (track 3)
- Weedstring – strings (track 3)

== Charts ==
Weekly chart performance for Glassy
Chart (2021)	Peak position
South Korean Albums (Gaon)	5

== Release history ==
Release history for Glassy
Region	Date	Format	Label
Various	October 7, 2021	Digital download; streaming	Wake One; Stone Music
South Korea	October 7, 2021	CD	Wake One; Stone Music
