= Dilemma (Apink song) =

Single by Apink

from the album Horn
- Language: Korean
- Released: February 14, 2022
- Studio: 821 Sound
- Length: 3:29
- Label: IST; Kakao
- Composers: B.E.P; Jeon Goon
- Lyricists: B.E.P; Jeon Goon

Apink singles chronology
"Thank You" (2021)	"Dilemma" (2022)	"I Want You To Be Happy" (2022)

Music video
- "Dilemma" on YouTube

"Dilemma" is a song recorded by South Korean girl group Apink for their fourth studio album Horn. It was released as the lead single by IST Entertainment on February 14, 2022. "Dilemma" was written and composed by B.E.P with Jeon Goon, and arranged by Rado.

== Background and release ==
On December 22, 2021, IST Entertainment announced Apink would be releasing a new album in February 2022. On January 22, it was announced that Apink would be releasing Horn on February 14. Four days later, the track listing was released with "Dilemma" announced as the lead single. On February 7, the highlight medley teaser video was released. The music video teasers was released on February 11 and 13.

== Composition ==
"Dilemma" was written and composed by B.E.P with Jeon Goon, and arranged by Rado. The song was described a dance song with "an addictive hook and gorgeous bass that keeps ringing in your ears". "Dilemma" was composed in the key of F minor, with a tempo of 130 beats per minute.

== Commercial performance ==
"Dilemma" debuted at position 55 on South Korea's Gaon Digital Chart in the chart issue dated February 13–19, 2022 on its component charts, the song debuted at position four on the Gaon Download Chart, position 94 on the Gaon Streaming Chart, and position 34 on the Gaon BGM Chart. On the Billboard K-pop Hot 100, the song debuted at position 61 in the chart issue dated February 26, 2022, ascending to position 60 in the following week. In United States, the song debuted at position 14 on the Billboard World Digital Song Sales in the chart issue dated February 26, 2022.

== Promotion ==
Following the release of the album, Apink held a live showcase on YouTube to introduce the album and communicate with their fans. The group subsequently performed "Dilemma" on two music programs on the first week: Mnet's M Countdown on February 17, and SBS's Inkigayo on February 20, On the second week, the group performed on three music programs: SBS MTV's The Show on February 22 where they won first place, Mnet's M Countdown on February 24, and KBS's Music Bank on February 25.

== Credits and personnel ==
Credits adapted from Horn's liner notes.

=== Studio ===
- 821 Sound – recording, digital editing
- Koko Sound Studio – mixing, mastering

=== Personnel ===
- B.E.P – lyrics, composition
  - Rado – arrangement, synthesizer, drums, backing vocals
- Jeon Goon – lyrics
- Kim Min-hee – recording, digital editing
- DRK – mixing, mastering
- Kim Jun-sang – assistant mixing
- Ji Min-woo – assistant mixing

== Charts ==
Weekly chart performance for "Dilemma"
Chart (2022)	Peak position
South Korea (Gaon)	55
South Korea (K-pop Hot 100)	60
US World Digital Song Sales (Billboard)	14

== Accolades ==
Music program awards for "Dilemma"
Title	Network	Date	Ref.
The Show	SBS MTV	February 22, 2022	

== Release history ==
Release history for "Dilemma"
Region	Date	Format	Label
Various	February 14, 2022	Digital download; streaming	IST; Kakao
