= Taxi (Jo Yu-ri song) =

Single by Jo Yu-ri

from the EP Love All
- Language: Korean
- Released: August 9, 2023
- Studio: WakeOne Studio; JoeLab; 821 Sound Mastering; Doobdoob Studio
- Genre: Dance-pop
- Length: 2:49
- Label: WakeOne; Stone Music
- Composers: Ludwig Lindell; Paulina "Pau" Cerrilla; Chris Meyer
- Lyricist: Hwang Yu-bin

Jo Yu-ri singles chronology
"Loveable" (2022)	"Taxi" (2023)

Music video
- "Taxi" on YouTube

"Taxi" is a song recorded by South Korean singer Jo Yu-ri for her second extended play Love All. It was released as the EP's lead single by WakeOne on August 9, 2023.

== Background and release ==
On July 25, 2023, Wake One Entertainment announced Jo Yu-ri would be releasing her second extended play titled Love All, alongside the lead single "Taxi", on August 9. On the same day, the highlight teaser video was released. On August 7, the music video teaser was released. The song was released alongside the extended play and its music video on August 9.

== Composition ==
"Taxi" is written by Hwang Yu-bin, composed and arranged by Ludwig Lindell with Paulina "Pau" Cerrilla, and Chris Meyer participating in the composition. It was described as a dance-pop song with lyrics about "reaching out in any way to expressing love despite clumsy words and actions in front of the exciting feeling of love". "Taxi" was composed in the key of B major, with a tempo of 123 beats per minute.

== Commercial performance ==
"Taxi" debuted at number 24 on South Korea's Circle Download Chart, and number 100 on the Circle BGM Chart, in the chart issue dated August 6–12, 2023.

== Promotion ==
Prior to the release of Love All, on August 9, 2023, Jo Yu-ri held a live event to introduce the extended play and its songs, including "Taxi", and to communicate with her fans. She subsequently performed on two music programs in the first week: Mnet's M Countdown on August 10, and SBS's Inkigayo on August 13. She also performed at the Saemangeum World Scout Jamboree K-Pop Concert on August 11, and MBC's Show! Music Core special broadcast of the 2023 Ulsan Summer Festival on August 12. On the second and last week of promotion, she performed on two music programs: SBS M's The Show on August 15, KBS's Music Bank on August 18, Show! Music Core special broadcast of the 2023 Cheonan K-Culture Expo on August 19, and Inkigayo on August 20, where she won first place for her appearance in The Show.

== Accolades ==
Music program awards for "Taxi"
Program	Date	Ref.
The Show	August 15, 2023	

== Credits and personnel ==
Studio

- WakeOne Studio – recording
- JoeLab – mixing
- 821 Sound Mastering – mastering
- Doobdoob Studio – digital editing

Personnel

- Jo Yu-ri – vocals
- Adora – background vocals
- Paulina "Pau" Cerrilla – background vocals, composition
- Lily – vocal directing
- Hwang Yu-bin – lyrics
- Ludwig Lindell – composition, arrangement
- Chris Meyer – composition
- Lee Chang-hoon – recording
- Dr. Joe – mixing
- Kang Dong-ho – mixing (assistant)
- Kwon Nam-woo – mastering
- Yoo Eun-jin – mastering (assistant)
- Kwon Yu-jin – digital editing

== Charts ==
Chart performance for "Taxi"
Chart (2023)	Peak position
South Korea Download (Circle)	24
South Korea BGM (Circle)	100

== Release history ==
Release history for "Taxi"
Region	Date	Format	Label
Various	August 9, 2023	Digital download; streaming	WakeOne; Stone Music

== See also ==
- List of The Show Chart winners (2023)
