= Love All (EP) =

- Digital cover

EP by Jo Yu-ri
- Released: August 9, 2023
- Genre: K-pop
- Length: 14:10
- Language: Korean
- Label: WakeOne; Stone Music

Jo Yu-ri chronology
Op.22 Y-Waltz: in Minor (2022)	Love All (2023)	Episode 25 (2025)

Singles from Love All
- 1. "Taxi" Released: August 9, 2023

Love All is the second extended play by South Korean singer Jo Yu-ri. It was released by WakeOne on August 9, 2023, and contains five tracks, including the lead single "Taxi".

== Background and release ==
On July 25, 2023, Wake One Entertainment announced Jo Yu-ri would be releasing her second extended play titled Love All, alongside the lead single "Taxi", on August 9. A day later, the promotional schedule was released. On August 2, the track listing was released. On the same day, the highlight teaser video for "Taxi" was released. On August 7, the music video teaser for "Taxi" was released. The extended play was released alongside the music video for "Taxi" on August 9.

== Commercial performance ==
Love All debuted at number 11 on South Korea's Circle Album Chart in the chart issue dated August 6–12, 2023.

== Promotion ==
Prior to the release of Love All, on August 9, 2023, Jo Yu-ri held a live event to introduce the extended play and its songs, and to communicate with her fans.

== Track listing ==
Track listing for Love All
No.	Title	Lyrics	Music	Arrangement	Length
1.	"Taxi"	Hwang Yu-bin	Ludwig Lindell; Paulina "Pau" Cerrilla; Chris Meyer	Ludwig Lindell	2:49
2.	"Lemon Black Tea"	Young K	Paulkyte; Eldon	Paulkyte	2:42
3.	"Bitter Taste"	Snnny	Alina Smith (Lyre); Annalise Morelli (Lyre); Jordyn Kane	Alina Smith (Lyre); Annalise Morelli (Lyre)	2:49
4.	"Hang On"	Jung Yun	Ryan S. Jhun; Thomas Eriksen; Marlene Strand; Geoffrey Patrick Earley; Ji Nilsson	Ryan S. Jhun; Earwulf	3:06
5.	"Bruise (멍)"	Hen	Hen	Hen	2:44
Total length:					14:10

== Credits and personnel ==
Studio

- WakeOne Studio – recording (track 1–2, 4–5)
- Seoul Studio – recording (track 3)
- JoeLab – mixing (track 1, 3)
- Studio505 Sound – mixing (track 2)
- Stay Tuned Studio – mixing (track 4)
- ToneStudio Seoul – mixing, digital editing (track 5)
- 821 Sound Mastering – mastering (all tracks)
- Doobdoob Studio – digital editing (track 1)
- 821 Sound Studio – digital editing (track 3)

Personnel

- Jo Yu-ri – vocals (all tracks), background vocals (track 2)
- Adora – background vocals (track 1)
- Paulina "Pau" Cerrilla – background vocals, composition (track 1)
- Paulkyte – background vocals, composition, arrangement, vocal directing, digital editing, instruments, MIDI programming (track 2)
- Lily – background vocals (track 3), vocal directing (track 1, 3)
- Kwon Ae-jin – background vocals, vocal directing (track 4)
- Hen – background vocals, lyrics, composition, arrangement, vocal directing, piano (track 5)
- Hwang Yu-bin – lyrics (track 1)
- Young K – lyrics (track 2)
- Snnny – lyrics (track 3)
- Jung Yun – lyrics (track 4)
- Ludwig Lindell – composition, arrangement (track 1)
- Chris Meyer – composition (track 1)
- Eldon – composition, vocal directing (track 2)
- Alina Smith (Lyre) – composition, arrangement (track 3)
- Annalise Morelli (Lyre) – composition, arrangement (track 3)
- Jordyn Kane – composition (track 3)
- Ryan S. Jhun – composition, arrangement (track 4)
- Thomas Eriksen – composition (track 4)
- Marlene Strand – composition (track 4)
- Geoffrey Patrick Earley – composition (track 4)
- Ji Nilsson – composition (track 4)
- Earwulf – arrangement (track 4)
- Lee Chang-hoon – recording (track 1–2, 4–5)
- Han Jun-seong – recording (track 3)
- Dr. Joe – mixing (track 1, 3)
- Kang Dong-ho – mixing (assistant) (track 1, 3)
- Lee Cheong-moo – mixing (track 2)
- Kim Hyun-joo – mixing (assistant) (track 2)
- Stay Tuned – mixing (track 4)
- Choi Min-seong – mixing, digital editing (track 5)
- Kwon Nam-woo – mastering (all tracks)
- Yoo Eun-jin – mastering (assistant) (all tracks)
- Kwon Yu-jin – digital editing (track 1)
- WK – digital editing (track 2)
- Kim Min-hee – digital editing (track 3)

== Charts ==
=== Weekly charts ===
Weekly chart performance for Love All
Chart (2023)	Peak position
South Korean Albums (Circle)	11

=== Monthly charts ===
Monthly chart performance for Love All
Chart (2023)	Position
South Korean Albums (Circle)	38

== Release history ==
Release history for Love All
Region	Date	Format	Label
South Korea	August 9, 2023	CD	WakeOne; Stone Music
Various	August 9, 2023	Digital download; streaming	WakeOne; Stone Music
