= Op.22 Y-Waltz: in Minor =

- Digital cover

Single album by Jo Yu-ri
- Released: October 24, 2022
- Genre: K-pop
- Length: 7:41
- Language: Korean
- Label: Wake One; Stone Music

Jo Yu-ri chronology
Op.22 Y-Waltz: in Major (2022)	Op.22 Y-Waltz: in Minor (2022)	Love All (2023)

Singles from Op.22 Y-Waltz: in Minor
- 1. "Loveable" Released: October 24, 2022

Op.22 Y-Waltz: in Minor is the second single album by South Korean singer Jo Yu-ri. It was released by Wake One Entertainment on October 24, 2022, and contains three tracks, including the lead single "Loveable".

== Background and release ==
On October 10, 2022, Wake One Entertainment announced Jo Yu-ri would be releasing her second single album titled Op.22 Y-Waltz: in Minor with "Loveable" serving as the lead single on October 24. A day later, the promotional schedule was released. On October 15, the track listing was released. On October 21, the music video teaser for "Loveable" was released. The single album was released alongside the music video for "Loveable" on October 24.

== Composition ==
Op.22 Y-Waltz: in Minor consists of three tracks. The lead single "Loveable" was described as a pop rock song characterized by "rhythmic guitar riffs and powerful drum" with lyrics that delivers "the message of positivity and hope of 'anyone can share love'". The second track "Blank" was described as a contemporary R&B song with lyrics that "expresses the will to love". The third track "Favorite Part" was described as song with lyrics about "wanting someone to know a small and precious secret that only you knows".

== Commercial performance ==
Op.22 Y-Waltz: in Minor debuted at number six on South Korea's Circle Album Chart in the chart issue dated October 23–29, 2022.

== Track listing ==
Track listing for Op.22 Y-Waltz: in Minor
No.	Title	Lyrics	Music	Arrangement	Length
1.	"Loveable"	Danke (Lalala Studio)	Alina Smith (153/Joombas); Sam Farrar; Gino Barletta; Annalise Morelli (153/Joombas)	Lyre; Sam Farrar	2:56
2.	"Blank"	Yeon Yu-jin (MUMW); Joa (MUMW)	Paulina "Pau" Cerrilla; Kyler Niko; Willie Weeks	Willie Weeks	3:07
3.	"Favorite Part"	Yejune Synn (Snnny); Deeno (Snnny); Hero (Snnny)	Yejune Synn (Snnny); Deeno (Snnny)	Yejune Synn (Snnny)	1:38
Total length:					7:41

== Charts ==
=== Weekly charts ===
Weekly chart performance for Op.22 Y-Waltz: in Minor
Chart (2022)	Peak position
South Korean Albums (Circle)	6

=== Monthly charts ===
Monthly chart performance for Op.22 Y-Waltz: in Minor
Chart (2022)	Peak position
South Korean Albums (Circle)	22

== Sales ==
Overall sales for
Region	Sales
South Korea	58,874

== Release history ==
Release history for Op.22 Y-Waltz: in Minor
Region	Date	Format	Label
South Korea	October 24, 2022	CD	Wake One; Stone Music
Various	October 24, 2022	Digital download; streaming	Wake One; Stone Music
