= Episode 25 =

- Digital cover

EP by Jo Yuri
- Released: July 14, 2025
- Genre: K-pop
- Length: 15:55
- Language: Korean
- Label: WakeOne; Genie Music; Stone Music

Jo Yuri chronology
| Love All (2023) | Episode 25 (2025) |

Singles from Episode 25
- 1. "Growls and Purrs" Released: July 7, 2025; 2. "Farewell for Now!" Released: July 14, 2025

Episode 25 is the third extended play by South Korean singer Jo Yuri. It was released by WakeOne on July 14, 2025, and contains five tracks, including the lead single "Farewell for Now!" and the pre-release single "Growls and Purrs".

== Background ==
After gaining wider attention for her acting role in the second and third seasons of Squid Game, Jo announced in June 2025 that she would be releasing her third EP titled Episode 25 on July 14.

In an interview prior to release, Jo described the title as reflecting a personal and artistic turning point at the age of twenty-five, shaped by her new experiences as an actor and a shift in the stories she wanted to tell as a singer. She identified the album’s band-oriented sound as a major challenge, and stated that she adjusted her vocal style to suit the genre and adopted a new visual image, including short hair.

== Release ==
On June 29, 2025, the promotion scheduler and track listing for Episode 25 were released. The track listing confirmed five songs, including the lead single "Farewell for Now!" and pre-release single "Growls and Purrs". On June 30 and July 1, the first two sets of concept photos and motion posters were released. The third and fourth sets were released on July 2 and 3, respectively. On July 4, the highlight medley video was released. On July 7, the pre-release single "Growls and Purrs" and its music video were released. The extended play was released on July 14, alongside the lead single "Farewell for Now!".

== Commercial performance ==
Episode 25 debuted at number 19 on South Korea's Circle Album Chart in the chart issue dated July 13–19, 2025.

== Promotion ==
Prior to the release of Episode 25, Jo Yuri held the 2025 Fan-Con Episode 25 on April 26 and 27, 2025, at Blue Square SOL Travel Hall in Seoul. The pre-release single "Growls and Purrs" was performed as a special stage at the fan-con.

== Track listing ==
Track listing for Episode 25
| No. | Title | Lyrics | Music | Arrangement | Length |
|---|---|---|---|---|---|
| 1. | "Farewell for Now!" (이제 안녕!) | OGI (Galactika); Yejune Synn; Deeno; Llano; Ian (153/Joombas); Lee Aeng-du (153/Joombas); Jo Yuri; Lee Si-dae (Room01); Park Han-pyung; Mia (153/Joombas) | Kim Jae-woong; Shin Geon-woo; Lee Seung-yoon; Park Moon-chi; Jang Deul-re | Park Moon-chi | 3:27 |
| 2. | "Growls and Purrs" (개와 고양이의 시간; lit. 'Dog and Cat Time') | Cloud; Jo Yuri | Cloud | Cloud | 3:19 |
| 3. | "Hiccup" | Coe; Ricardo Hanne | Coe; U-Lu (Badx); Kyrielle; Coup D'etat; Suyo; Ricardo Hanne | U-Lu (Badx); Kyrielle | 3:15 |
| 4. | "Going Under" (잠수해; lit. 'Dive') | Llano; Gujo (153/Joombas) | Strawberrybananaclub; C'SA | Strawberrybananaclub | 3:16 |
| 5. | "Overkill" | Isac Hördegård; Hannes Roovers; Sam Merrifield; Amanda Cygnaeus | Isac Hördegård; Hannes Roovers; Sam Merrifield; Amanda Cygnaeus | Medium | 2:38 |
| Total length: | | | | | 15:55 |

== Credits and personnel ==
Credits and personnel are adapted from Bugs.

Studio

- doobdoob – recording (track 1)
- onr Studio – digital editing (tracks 1, 3, 5)
- Stay Tuned Studio – mixing (tracks 1–3)
- 821 Sound Mastering – mastering (all tracks)
- Vibe Music 606 – recording (tracks 2–4)
- kokosound studio – mixing (track 4)
- WakeOne Studio – recording, digital editing (track 5)
- GLAB Studios – mixing (track 5)

Personnel

- Jo Yuri – vocals (all tracks), lyrics (tracks 1–2)
- OGI (Galactika) – lyrics (track 1)
- Yejune Synn – lyrics (track 1)
- Deeno – lyrics (track 1)
- Llano – lyrics (tracks 1, 4)
- Ian (153/Joombas) – lyrics (track 1)
- Lee Aeng-du (153/Joombas) – lyrics (track 1)
- Lee Si-dae (Room1) – lyrics (track 1)
- Park Han-pyung – lyrics (track 1)
- Mia (153/Joombas) – lyrics (track 1)
- Kim Jae-woong – composition, background vocals (track 1)
- Shin Gun-woo – composition, background vocals (track 1)
- Lee Seung-yoon – composition (track 1)
- Park Moon-chi – composition, arrangement, keyboard, synthesizer, drums (track 1)
- Jang Deul-re – composition (track 1)
- Goo Young-jun – guitar (track 1)
- Kim Min-seok – bass (track 1)
- RuRu – background vocals (track 1)
- Eldon – background vocals (track 1)
- Cloud – production, composition, lyrics, arrangement, piano, keyboard, chorus, MIDI programming, vocal directing, digital editing (track 2)
- Kohu – keyboard, MIDI programming (track 2)
- Heo Se-gwa – guitar (track 2)
- Lee Han-gyeol – bass (track 2)
- Soo-kyung – chorus (track 2)
- Coe – lyrics, composition, background vocals, vocal directing (track 3)
- Ricardo Hanne – lyrics, composition (track 3)
- U-Lu (BadX) – composition, arrangement (track 3)
- Kyrielle – composition, arrangement, piano, string (track 3)
- Coup D'etat – composition (track 3)
- Suyo – composition, background vocals (track 3)
- Adora – background vocals (track 3)
- Gujo (153/Joombas) – lyrics (track 4)
- Strawberrybananaclub – composition, arrangement, drums, vocal directing (track 4)
- C'SA – composition, background vocals, vocal directing, digital editing (track 4)
- Kang Jin-hyun – bass (track 4)
- Isac Hördegård – lyrics, composition (track 5)
- Hannes Roovers – lyrics, composition (track 5)
- Sam Merrifield – lyrics, composition (track 5)
- Amanda Cygnaeus – lyrics, composition (track 5)
- Medium – arrangement (track 5)
- Flora – background vocals (track 5)
- D'tour – vocal directing (track 5)
- Kim Ji-hyun – recording (track 1)
- Ahn Chang-gyu – digital editing (tracks 1, 3, 5)
- Ha Tae-won – digital editing assistant (tracks 1, 3, 5)
- Stay Tuned – mixing (tracks 1–3)
- Kwon Nam-woo – mastering (all tracks)
- Yoo Eun-jin – mastering assistant (all tracks)
- Lee Kang-hyun – recording (tracks 2–4)
- Go Hyun-jung – mixing (track 4)
- Ji Min-woo – mixing assistant (track 4)
- Kim Jun-young – mixing assistant (track 4)
- Hong Soo-yeon – recording, digital editing (track 5)
- Shin Bong-won – mixing (track 5)
- Park Nam-joon – mixing assistant (track 5)

== Charts ==
=== Weekly charts ===
Weekly chart performance for Episode 25
| Chart (2025) | Peak position |
|---|---|
| South Korean Albums (Circle) | 19 |

=== Monthly charts ===
Monthly chart performance for Episode 25
| Chart (2025) | Position |
|---|---|
| South Korean Albums (Circle) | 54 |

== Release history ==
Release history for Episode 25
| Region | Date | Format | Label |
|---|---|---|---|
| South Korea | July 14, 2025 | CD | WakeOne; Genie Music; Stone Music |
| Various | July 14, 2025 | Digital download; streaming | WakeOne; Genie Music; Stone Music |
