= Jo Yuri =

South Korean singer and actress (born 2001)

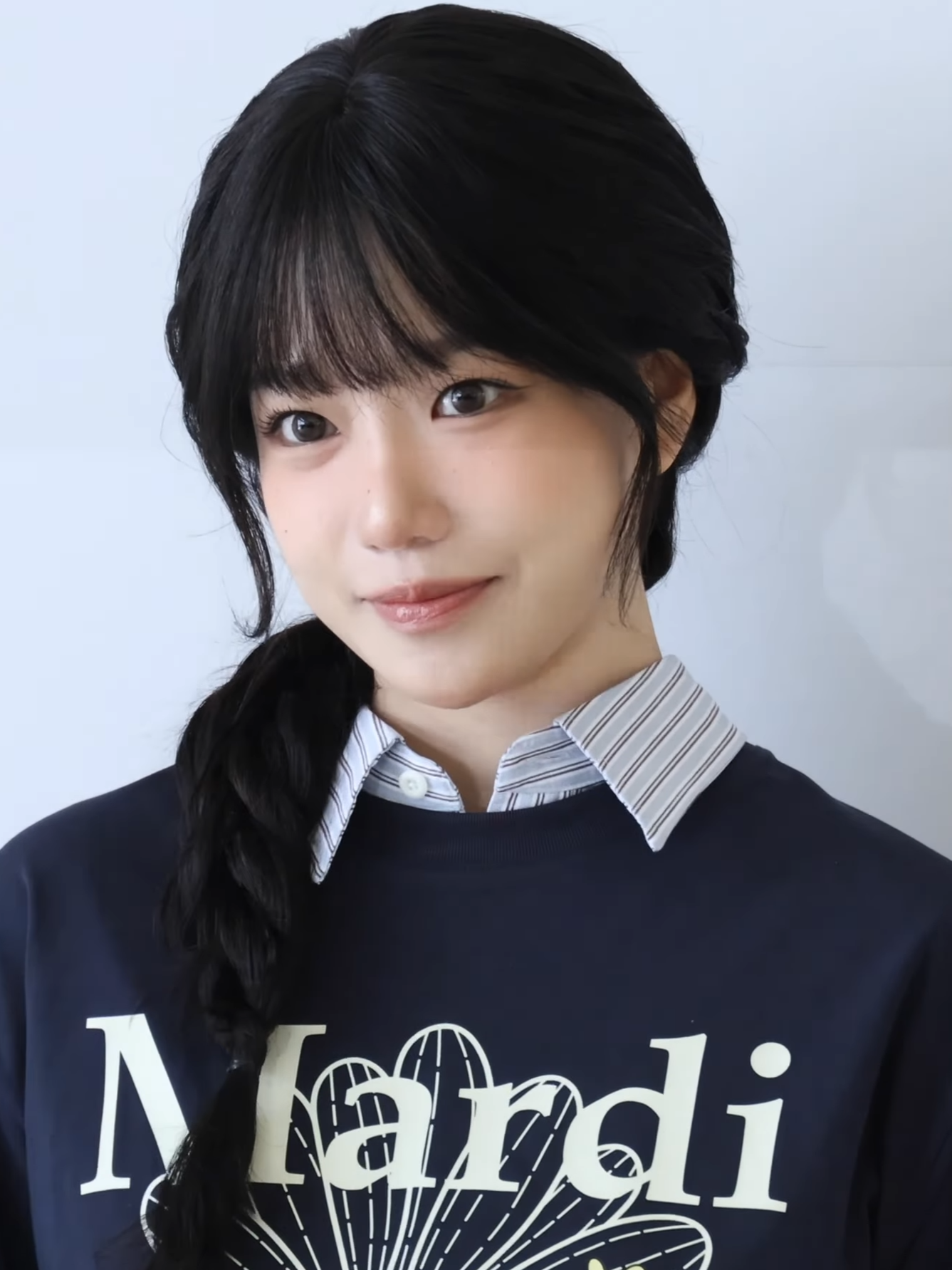
- Jo in August 2025
- Born: October 22, 2001 (age 25); Busan, South Korea
- Occupations: Singer; actress
- Years active: 2017–present
- Musical career
- Genre: K-pop
- Instrument: Vocals
- Labels: Stone Music; Off the Record (Note: As a member of Iz*One only.); EMI; WakeOne
- Formerly of: Iz*One
- Website: Official website

Korean name
- Hangul: 조유리
- RR: Jo Yuri
- MR: Cho Yuri

Signature
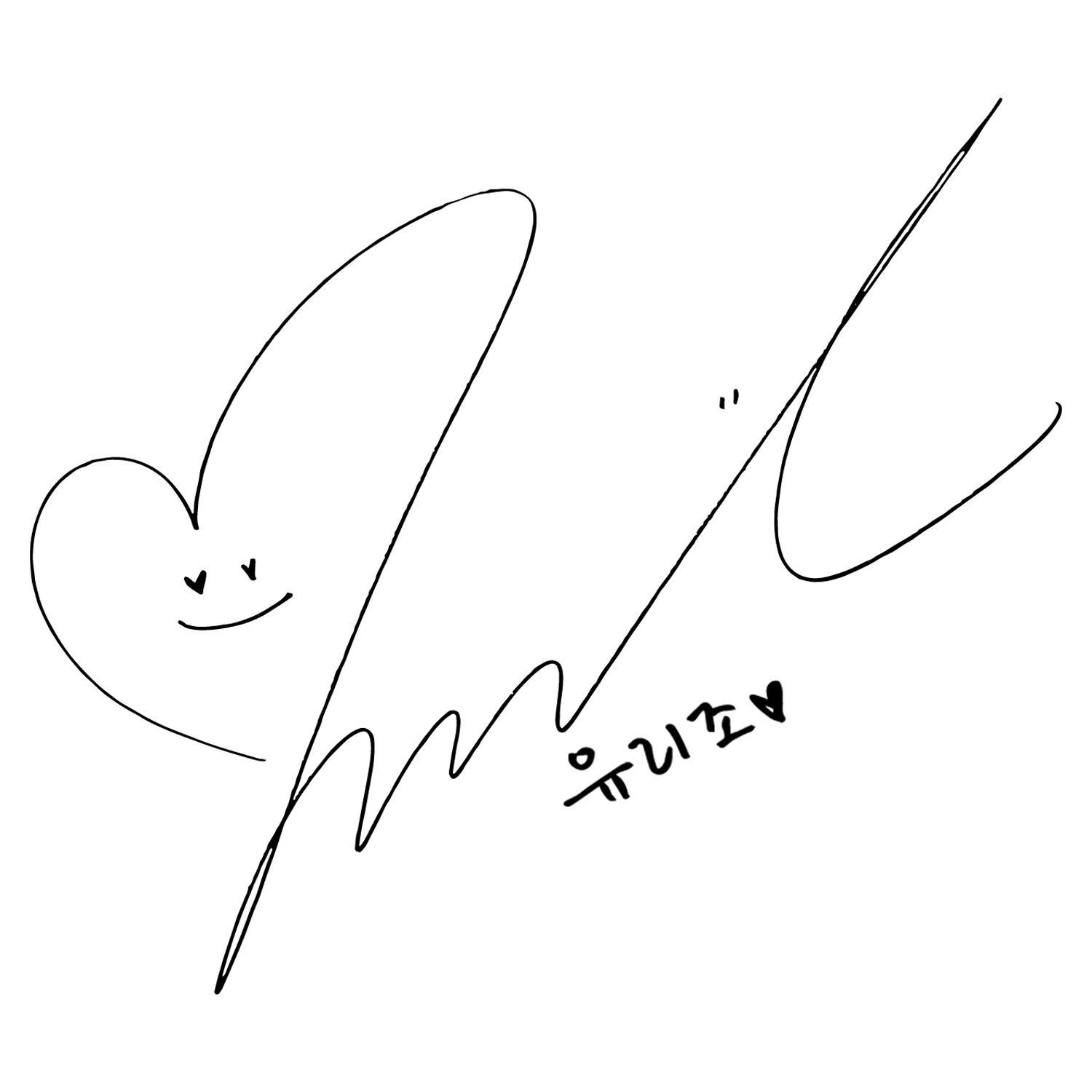

Jo Yuri (Korean: 조유리; born October 22, 2001) is a South Korean singer and actress. She is known as a former member of the South Korean–Japanese girl group Iz*One. She first gained prominence after participating in Mnet's reality competition series Produce 48 in 2018, where she finished in third place and debuted with Iz*One on October 29, 2018.

Following Iz*One's disbandment in April 2021, Jo embarked on a successful solo career, releasing her debut single album Glassy in October 2021, which garnered her several nominations for Rookie of the Year at major music awards. In addition to her music career, Jo has ventured into acting, making her debut in the web series Mimicus (2022) and later having widespread recognition for her role as Kim Jun-hee (Player 222) in the second and third seasons of Squid Game (2024–2025).

== Career ==
=== 2017–2020: Pre-debut and Iz*One ===
In July 2017, Jo participated in Mnet's reality television show Idol School where the nine final participants would debut with newly formed girl group Fromis 9. She finished in 15th place.

On May 11, 2018, Jo participated in Mnet's reality television show Produce 48 where she finished in 3rd place. As one of twelve successful participants, she went on to be a part of the newly formed girl group Iz*One. On October 29, 2018, Jo debuted as a member of Iz*One with the release of Color*Iz. On February 17, 2020, Iz*One released their first Korean-language studio album Bloom*Iz, on which Jo wrote and co-composed the song "Someday", a sub-unit song sung by her, Kim Chae-won, and Choi Ye-na. The group disbanded on April 29, 2021, upon the expiration of their contract.

On September 22, 2020, Jo released "My Love" for SBS's television series Do You Like Brahms?.

=== 2021–present: Solo activities ===
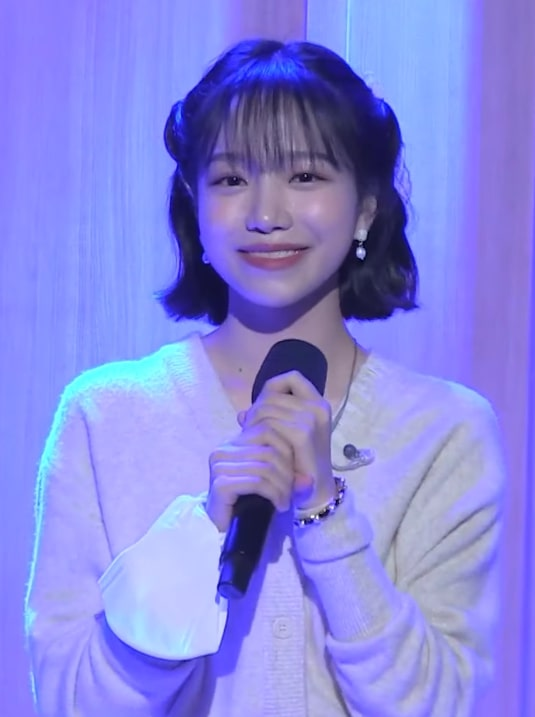
Jo in 2021

On June 24, 2021, Jo released "Story of Us" for JTBC's television series Monthly Magazine Home.

On September 23, Jo released "Autumn Memories" (가을 상자), a collaboration song with Lee Seok-hoon. On September 24, WakeOne announced that Jo will be releasing her first single album titled Glassy on October 7, with lead single of the same name. Following her debut as a soloist, Jo was nominated for Rookie of the Year at the 36th Golden Disc Awards, Best New Female Artist at the 2021 Mnet Asian Music Awards, and Rookie of the Year at the 31st Seoul Music Awards.

On April 11, 2022, Jo was cast in her first acting role, the Playlist Studio web series Mimicus. On May 17, it was announced that Jo would be releasing her first extended play titled Op.22 Y-Waltz: in Major on June 2, with lead single "Love Shhh!". The album debuted at number five on South Korea's Circle Album Chart. On June 7, she achieved her first ever music show win on SBS M's The Show for "Love Shhh!" On August 11, Jo released the promotional single "Maybe" through Universe. On September 13, Jo released the song "Can You Feel My Heart" as part of the soundtrack for the KBS2 television series The Law Cafe.

On October 8, it was announced that Jo would be releasing her second single album titled Op.22 Y-Waltz: in Minor on October 24. Later that same month, Jo released the song "Run (Female Ver.)" for the Netflix television series The Fabulous. In December 2022, Jo made a special appearance in episode 7 of the second season of Work Later, Drink Now portraying Sieun, a juvenile delinquent. Jo's performance was well received by critics such as Choi Hye-jin writing for MT Star News, who praised Jo's natural acting and described the performance as "short, but leaving a strong impression". In addition to her appearance, Jo also released the track "Drink It, Girls!" as part of the soundtrack for Work Later, Drink Now 2.

On June 29, 2023, it was announced that Jo had been cast in the second season of the Netflix television series Squid Game, which was released in December 2024. She also appeared in season 3 of the series, which was released in June 2025. She played the role of Kim Jun-hee, also known as Player 222, where she gained significant attention for her acting in the series. On July 2, Jo released the track "Down (Juicy Juicy)" for tvN television series See You in My 19th Life. Three days later, she released a cover of Taeyeon's "A Poem Titled You". On July 25, it was announced that Jo would be releasing her second extended play titled Love All, alongside the lead single "Taxi", on August 9. On August 29, she and Zerobaseone's Sung Han-bin released the duet "Luv Luv Luv" as part of the soundtrack for the tvN series My Lovely Liar.

On October 25, 2024, Jo released the track "Spring Days pass" for tvN television series Jeongnyeon: The Star Is Born. On June 25, 2025, it was announced that Jo would release her third extended play Episode 25 on July 14, two years after her previous release. On July 7, the pre-release track "Growls and Purrs" was released, followed by the release of Episode 25 on July 14. On July 13, Jo Yu-ri revealed on the MBC variety show Omniscient Interfering View that she had officially renewed her contract with WakeOne.

On July 21, 2025, it was announced that Jo would be starring in the Netflix television series Variety, portraying the lead role of Seung-hee, an obsessive K-pop fan. On April 25, 2026, it was announced that Jo would be starring in the television series Love Virus, portraying the lead role of Im Mi-a, a criminal hunter.

== Endorsements ==
In 2021, Jo appeared in advertising for Olive Young's cosmetic brand colorgram.

In August 2022, Jo was selected as a promotional model for Logitech G Aurora Collection, a gaming gear line with a pastel color scheme.

On May 24, 2023, Jo and actress Chae Soo-bin released the promotional single "Yellow Circle" in collaboration with Lipton and Starship Entertainment.

In March 2025, Jo collaborated with the South Korean fashion brand Mardi Mercredi after being selected as one of its models. The collaboration was presented through a pictorial released in conjunction with Dazed Korea.

== Discography ==
=== Extended plays ===
List of extended plays, showing selected details, selected chart positions, and sales figures
| Title | Details | Peak chart positions | | Sales |
| Title | Details | KOR | JPN | Sales |
|---|---|---|---|---|
| Op.22 Y-Waltz: in Major | Released: June 2, 2022; Label: Wake One; Formats: CD, digital download, streaming | 5 | 27 | KOR: 92,679; JPN: 3,139 (Phy.) |
| Love All | Released: August 9, 2023; Label: Wake One; Formats: CD, digital download, streaming | 11 | — | KOR: 38,232 |
| Episode 25 | Released: July 14, 2025; Label: Wake One; Formats: CD, digital download, streaming | 19 | — | KOR: 22,828 |
"—" denotes a recording that did not chart or was not released in that territory

=== Single albums ===
List of single albums, showing selected details, selected chart positions, and sales figures
| Title | Details | Peak chart positions | Sales |
| Title | Details | KOR | Sales |
|---|---|---|---|
| Glassy | Released: October 7, 2021; Label: Wake One; Formats: CD, digital download, streaming | 5 | KOR: 89,168 |
| Op.22 Y-Waltz: in Minor | Released: October 24, 2022; Label: Wake One; Formats: CD, digital download, streaming | 6 | KOR: 58,874 |

=== Singles ===
List of singles, showing year released, selected chart positions, and name of the album
| Title | Year | Peak chart positions | | Album |
| Title | Year | KOR | KOR Billb. (Note: Includes the Billboard K-pop Hot 100 (defunct as of 2022), and South Korea Songs (part of Billboard's Hits of the World (2022 onwards)).) | Album |
|---|---|---|---|---|
| "Autumn Memories" (가을 상자) (with Lee Seok-hoon) | 2021 | 193 | — | Non-album single |
| "Glassy" | 2021 | 137 | 84 | Glassy |
| "Love Shhh!" (러브 쉿!) | 2022 | 97 | 16 | Op.22 Y-Waltz: in Major |
| "Loveable" | 2022 | — (Note: "Loveable" did not enter the Circle Digital Chart, but peaked at number 18 on the component Download Chart.) | — | Op.22 Y-Waltz: in Minor |
| "Taxi" | 2023 | — (Note: "Taxi" did not enter the Circle Digital Chart, but peaked at number 24 on the component Download Chart.) | — | Love All |
| "Growls and Purrs" (개와 고양이의 시간) | 2025 | — (Note: "Growls and Purrs" did not enter the Circle Digital Chart, but peaked at number 57 on the component Download Chart.) | — | Episode 25 |
| "Farewell for Now!" (이제 안녕!) | 2025 | — (Note: "Farewell for Now!" did not enter the Circle Digital Chart, but peaked at number 26 on the component Download Chart.) | — | Episode 25 |
"—" denotes a recording that did not chart or was not released in that territory.

==== Promotional singles ====
List of promotional singles, showing year released, selected chart positions, and name of the album
| Title | Year | Peak chart positions | Album |
| Title | Year | KOR DL | Album |
|---|---|---|---|
| "Maybe" (모를 수도 있지만) | 2022 | 77 | Non-album singles |
| "Yellow Circle" (with Chae Soo-bin) | 2023 | 121 | Non-album singles |

=== Soundtrack appearances ===
List of soundtrack appearances, showing year released, selected chart positions, and name of the album
| Title | Year | Peak chart positions | Album |
| Title | Year | KOR DL | Album |
|---|---|---|---|
| "My Love" | 2020 | 29 | Do You Like Brahms? OST Part 7 |
| "Story of Us" | 2021 | 62 | Monthly Magazine Home OST Part 2 |
| "Can You Feel My Heart" (내 마음을 느끼나요) | 2022 | 8 | The Law Cafe OST Part 2 |
| "Run (Female Ver.)" | 2022 | — | The Fabulous OST Part 2 |
| "Drink It, Girls!" (적셔!) | 2023 | 85 | Work Later, Drink Now 2 OST Part 5 |
| "Down (Juicy Juicy)" | 2023 | 41 | See You in My 19th Life OST |
| "Luv Luv Luv" (with Sung Han-bin) | 2023 | 46 | My Lovely Liar OST Part 5 |
| "Lost Dreams" | 2023 | — | Street Woman Fighter 2 OST Part 3 |
| "My Highlight" | 2024 | 117 | True Beauty (Aeni Series) Season 1 OST Part 1 |
| "Spring Days Pass" (봄날은 간다!) | 2024 | 77 | Jeongnyeon: The Star Is Born OST Part 3 |
"—" denotes a recording that did not chart or was not released in that territory.

=== Other charted songs ===
List of songs, showing year released, selected chart positions, and name of the album
| Title | Year | Peak chart positions | Album |
| Title | Year | KOR DL | Album |
|---|---|---|---|
| "Express Moon" | 2021 | 57 | Glassy |
| "Round and Around" | 2022 | 73 | Op.22 Y-Waltz : in Major |
| "Rolla Skates" | 2022 | 63 | Op.22 Y-Waltz : in Major |
| "This Time" | 2022 | 69 | Op.22 Y-Waltz : in Major |
| "Opening" | 2022 | 68 | Op.22 Y-Waltz : in Major |
| "Blank" | 2022 | 52 | Op.22 Y-Waltz : in Minor |
| "Favorite Part" | 2022 | 61 | Op.22 Y-Waltz : in Minor |
| "A Poem Titled You" (그대라는 시) | 2023 | 68 | Non-album single |
| "Lemon Black Tea" | 2023 | 59 | Love All |
| "Bitter Taste" | 2023 | 74 | Love All |
| "Hang On" | 2023 | 76 | Love All |
| "Bruise" (멍) | 2023 | 67 | Love All |
| "Alcohol is" (술이야) | 2023 | 113 | Non-album single |

=== Composition credits ===
All song credits are adapted from the Korea Music Copyright Association's database unless stated otherwise.

List of songs, showing year released, artist name, name of the album, and credited roles
| Title | Year | Artist | Album | Composer | Lyricist | Arranger |
|---|---|---|---|---|---|---|
| "Someday" | 2020 | Iz*One | Bloom*Iz | Yes | Yes | No |
| "With*One" | 2020 | Iz*One | Oneiric Diary | No | Yes | No |
| "Opening" | 2022 | Jo Yu-ri | Op.22 Y-Waltz: in Major | Yes | Yes | No |
| "Growls and Purrs" | 2025 | Jo Yu-ri | Episode 25 | No | Yes | No |
| "Farewell for Now!" | 2025 | Jo Yu-ri | Episode 25 | No | Yes | No |

== Videography ==
=== Music videos ===
| Title | Year | Director(s) | Ref. |
|---|---|---|---|
| "Glassy" | 2021 | Sunny Visual | |
| "Love Shhh!" | 2022 | Sunny Visual | |
| "Loveable" | 2022 | Jo Won-Jun (Studio Wacko) | |
| "Taxi" | 2023 | 725 (SL Visual Lab) | |
| "Farewell for Now!" | 2025 | Unknown | |

== Filmography ==
=== Film ===
| Year | Title | Role | Notes | Ref. |
|---|---|---|---|---|
| 2026 | Possible Love | young Mi-ok | | |

=== Television series ===
Television series appearances
| Year | Title | Role | Notes | Ref. |
|---|---|---|---|---|
| 2024–2025 | Squid Game | Kim Jun-hee (Player 222) | Seasons 2–3 | |
| TBA | Variety | Seung-hee | | |
| TBA | Love Virus | Im Mi-a | | |

=== Web series ===
Web series appearances
| Year | Title | Role | Notes | Ref. |
|---|---|---|---|---|
| 2022 | Mimicus | Oh Ro-si | | |
| 2022 | Work Later, Drink Now | Si-eun | Cameo (season 2) | |

=== Television shows ===
Television shows appearances
| Year | Title | Role | Notes | Ref. |
|---|---|---|---|---|
| 2017 | Idol School | Contestant | Finished at 15th place | |
| 2018 | Produce 48 | Contestant | Finished at 3rd place | |
| 2022 | As Each Instinct | Host | with Lee Dae-hwi | |

=== Web shows ===
Web shows appearances
| Year | Title | Role | Notes | Ref. |
|---|---|---|---|---|
| 2021–2022 | Adola Travel Agency: Cheat-ing Trip | Host | Season 1–2 | |

=== Music video appearances ===
| Year | Title | Artist | Ref. |
|---|---|---|---|
| 2025 | "Lost and Found" | Cloud Koh | |

== Awards and nominations ==
Name of the award ceremony, year presented, category, nominee of the award, and the result of the nomination
| Award ceremony | Year | Category | Nominee / Work | Result | Ref. |
|---|---|---|---|---|---|
| Asia Artist Awards | 2021 | Female Solo Singer Popularity Award | Jo Yu-ri | Nominated | |
| Asia Artist Awards | 2024 | Best Choice Award – TV/Film | Jo Yu-ri | Won | |
| Asia Artist Awards | 2024 | Emotive Award – TV/Film | Jo Yu-ri | Won | |
| Asian Pop Music Awards | 2021 | Best New Artist (Overseas) | Glassy | Nominated | |
| Brand Customer Loyalty Awards | 2025 | Female Multi-tainer | Jo Yu-ri | Won | |
| Golden Disc Awards | 2022 | Rookie of the Year Award | Jo Yu-ri | Nominated | |
| Golden Disc Awards | 2022 | Seezn Most Popular Artist Award | Jo Yu-ri | Nominated | |
| Korea First Brand Awards | 2023 | Actress-Idol to Lead 2023 | Jo Yu-ri | Won | |
| MAMA Awards | 2021 | Artist of the Year | Jo Yu-ri | Longlisted | |
| MAMA Awards | 2021 | Best New Female Artist | Jo Yu-ri | Nominated | |
| MAMA Awards | 2022 | Worldwide Fans' Choice Top 10 | Jo Yu-ri | Nominated | |
| Mnet Japan Fan's Choice Awards | 2022 | Hot Icon | Jo Yu-ri | Won | |
| Seoul Music Awards | 2022 | K-wave Popularity Award | Jo Yu-ri | Nominated | |
| Seoul Music Awards | 2022 | Popularity Award | Jo Yu-ri | Nominated | |
| Seoul Music Awards | 2022 | Rookie of the Year | Jo Yu-ri | Nominated | |
