= Ruel discography =

Australian singer and songwriter

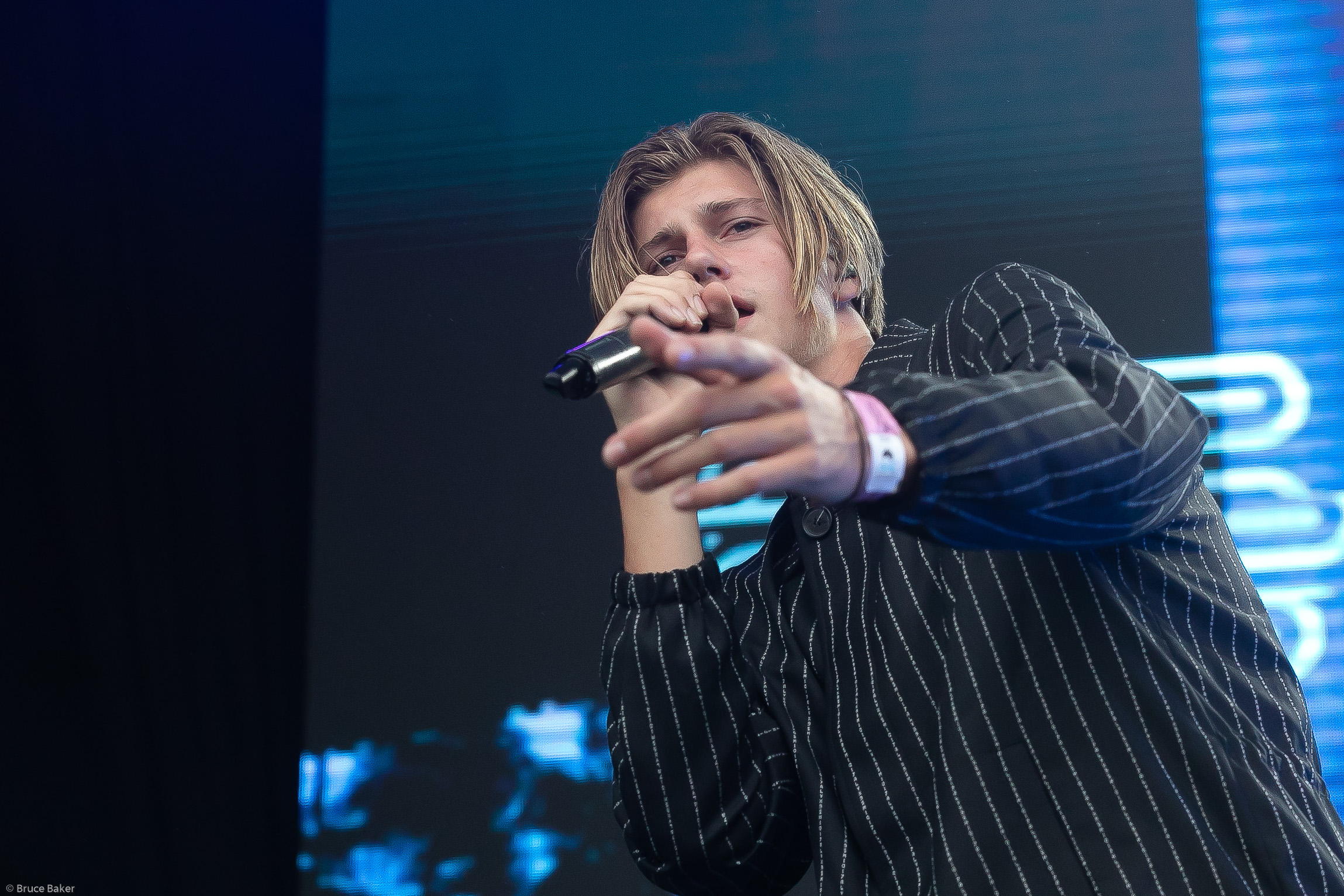
- Ruel performing at Laneway Festival, 2020
- Studio albums: 3
- EPs: 5
- Singles: 45
- Music videos: 35

British-born Australian singer Ruel has released three studio albums, five extended plays, forty-five singles (including four as a featured artist), and thirty-five music videos.

== Albums ==
=== Studio albums ===
List of albums, with selected details
Title	Details	Peak chart positions		
Title	Details	AUS	NZ	UK
4th Wall	Released: 3 March 2023; Format: CD, digital, LP; Label: RCA, Sony	3	10	—
Kicking My Feet	Released: 17 October 2025; Format: CD, digital, LP; Label: Recess Records	6	—	— (Note: Kicking My Feet did not enter the UK top 100, but peaked at number 100 on the Physical Albums Chart.)
Kicking My Feet & Screaming	Released: 12 June 2026; Format: CD, digital, LP; Label: Recess Records	25	24	—

== Extended plays ==
List of EPs, with release date, selected chart positions, and label shown
Title	EP details	Peak chart positions			Certifications
Title	EP details	AUS	NZ	UK	Certifications
Ready	Released: 15 June 2018; Formats: Digital download, streaming; Label: RCA, Sony Music Australia	76	— (Note: Ready did not enter the NZ Top 40 Albums Chart, but peaked at number 3 on the Heatseeker Albums Chart.)	—	RMNZ: Gold
Free Time	Released: 13 September 2019; Label: RCA, Sony Music Australia; Formats: CD, digital download, streaming	3	18	— (Note: Free Time did not enter the UK top 100, but peaked at number 74 on the Downloads Albums Chart.)	KMCA: 3× Platinum; RMNZ: Gold
Bright Lights, Red Eyes	Released: 23 October 2020; Label: RCA, Sony Music Australia; Formats: Digital download, streaming	—	40	—	
Adaptations	Released: 2 August 2024; Label: Giant Music; Formats: Cassette, digital download, streaming	—	—	—	
Kicking My Feet (Live Sessions)	Released: 19 December 2025; Label: Giant Music; Formats: digital download, streaming	—	—	—	
What It Sounds Like	Released: 18 April 2026; Label: Recess Records; Formats: LP (RSD 2026 exclusive)	—	—	—	

== Singles ==
=== As lead artist ===
List of singles, with year released, selected chart positions, certifications, and album name shown
Title	Year	Peak chart positions			Certifications	Album
Title	Year	AUS	NZ Heat.	NZ Hot	Certifications	Album
"Golden Years" (with M-Phazes)	2017	—	—	—		Non-album single
"Don't Tell Me"	2017	86	—	—	ARIA: Platinum	Ready
"Dazed & Confused"	2018	53	7	—	ARIA: 2× Platinum; RIAA: Gold; RMNZ: Platinum	Ready
"Younger"	2018	76	—	—	ARIA: 2× Platinum; RMNZ: Platinum	Ready
"Not Thinkin' Bout You" (solo or remix featuring GoldLink)	2018	—	—	—	ARIA: Gold; RMNZ: Gold	Ready
"Say" (acoustic version featuring Jake Meadows)	2019	—	—	—	ARIA: Gold	Ready
"Painkiller" (solo or featuring Denzel Curry)	2019	35	—	6	ARIA: 3× Platinum; RIAA: Gold; RMNZ: Gold	Free Time
"Face to Face"	2019	73	—	8	ARIA: Gold; RMNZ: Gold	Free Time
"Real Thing"	2019	73	—	18	ARIA: Gold	Free Time
"Down for You" (with Cosmo's Midnight)	2020	—	—	9		Yesteryear
"Empty Love" (with Gracey)	2020	—	—	21		The Art of Closure
"As Long as You Care"	2020	— (Note: "As Long as You Care" did not reach the ARIA Top 100 Singles Chart, but peaked at number fourteen on the ARIA Top 20 Australian Artist Singles Chart.)	—	8	ARIA: Gold	Bright Lights, Red Eyes
"Say It Over" (featuring Cautious Clay)	2020	—	—	33		Bright Lights, Red Eyes
"Distance"	2021	—	—	14		Bright Lights, Red Eyes
"Too Many Feelings"	2021	— (Note: "Too Many Feelings" did not reach the ARIA Top 100 Singles Chart, but peaked at number fourteen on the ARIA Top 20 Australian Hip Hop/R&B Singles Chart.)	—	15		Non-album single
"Notice Me" (with Dylan J)	2021	—	—	—		4 Songs I Made in California
"Growing Up Is..."	2021	68	—	11	ARIA: Gold	4th Wall
"Let the Grass Grow"	2022	—	—	18		4th Wall
"You Against Yourself"	2022	—	—	27		4th Wall
"Someone Else's Problem"	2022	—	—	15		4th Wall
"Must Be Nice"	2023	—	—	—		4th Wall
"I Don't Wanna Be Like You"	2023	—	—	22		4th Wall
"What a Life" (with DMA's)	2024	—	—	—		Non-album singles
"We're a Pair of Diamonds" (with DMA's)	2024	—	—	—		Non-album singles
"Kiss Me"	2024	—	—	—		Adaptations
"Call Out My Name"	2024	—	—	—		Adaptations
"Cats on the Ceiling"	2024	—	—	39		Non-album singles
"Santa Doesn't Know You Like I Do"	2024	—	—	—		Non-album singles
"Made It Awkward"	2024	—	—	—		Non-album singles
"Dandelion" (with grentperez)	2025	—	—	38		Backflips in a Restaurant
"Melodramatic Fanatic" (with Lime Cordiale)	2025	—	—	34		Non-album single
"I Can Die Now"	2025	—	—	29		Kicking My Feet
"The Suburbs"	2025	—	—	—		Kicking My Feet
"Wild Guess"	2025	—	—	—		Kicking My Feet
"Not What's Going On"	2025	—	—	26		Kicking My Feet
"Destroyer"	2025	—	—	—		Kicking My Feet
"Don't Say That"	2026	—	—	4		Kicking My Feet & Screaming
"Hate Myself"	2026	—	—	—		Kicking My Feet & Screaming
"Debbie Don't Cry"	2026	—	—	—		Kicking My Feet & Screaming
"Faking Smiles"	2026	—	—	27		Kicking My Feet & Screaming
"Another You" (with Sadie Jean)	2026	—	—	36		Non-album single
"Helplessly Hoping"	2026	—	—	—		Forever Young by War Child Australia
"—" denotes a recording that did not chart or was not released in that territory.

=== As featured artist ===
List of singles, with year released, selected chart positions, and album name shown
Title	Year	Peak chart positions	Album
Title	Year	NZ Hot	Album
"Human" (Tom Thum featuring Ruel)	2017	—	Non-album singles
"Weathered" (M-Phazes featuring Ruel; Triple J Like a Version)	2017	—	Non-album singles
"Flames" (SG Lewis featuring Ruel)	2019	35	Dawn
"Dream No More" (Billy Davis featuring Genesis Owusu and Ruel)	2021	—	This Is What's Important

== Other charted songs ==
List of non-single chart appearances, with year released and album name shown
Title	Year	Peak chart positions	Certifications	Album
Title	Year	NZ Hot	Certifications	Album
"Don't Cry"	2019	29		Free Time
"Hard Sometimes"	2019	28	ARIA: Gold	Free Time
"Unsaid"	2019	33		Free Time
"Free Time"	2019	47	ARIA: Gold	Free Time
"Courage"	2020	26		Bright Lights, Red Eyes
"Up to Something"	2020	31		Bright Lights, Red Eyes

== Other appearances ==
List of non-single guest appearances, with other performing artists, showing year released and album name
Title	Year	Artist(s)	Album	Ref.
"Fire & Grace"	2019	Hilltop Hoods	The Great Expanse	
"Want U Around"	2020	Omar Apollo	Apolonio	
"Golden Hour" (Ruel remix)	2022	Jvke	Non-album single	

== Music videos ==
List of music videos, with year released and director shown
Title	Year	Director(s)	Ref.
"Human" (Tom Thum featuring Ruel)	2017	Tom Wilson	
"Golden Years"	2018	Marcus Flack	
"Don't Tell Me"	2018	—N/a	
"Dazed & Confused"	2018	Grey Ghost	
"Younger"	2018	Grey Ghost	
"Not Thinkin' 'Bout You"	2018	Grey Ghost	
"Painkiller"	2019	Grey Ghost	
"Flames" (SG Lewis featuring Ruel)	2019	Grey Ghost	
"Face to Face"	2019	Grey Ghost	
"Real Thing"	2019	Grey Ghost	
"Down for You" (with Cosmo's Midnight)	2020	—N/a	
"Empty Love" (with Gracey)	2020	—N/a	
"As Long as You Care"	2020	Grey Ghost	
"Say It Over" (visualizer) (featuring Cautious Clay)	2020	Grey Ghost	
"Courage" (visualizer)	2020	Grey Ghost	
"Say It Over" (featuring Cautious Clay)	2020	Grey Ghost	
"Distance"	2021	Grey Ghost	
"Growing Up Is ___"	2021	Grey Ghost	
"Let the Grass Grow"	2022	Joel Chamaa	
"You Against Yourself"	2022	Grey Ghost	
"I Don't Wanna Be Like You"	2023	James Chappell	
"What A Life" (with DMA'S)	2024	Charles Buxton-Leslie	
"We're A Pair Of Diamonds" (with DMA's)	2024	Charles Buxton-Leslie	
"Kiss Me"	2024	Juan Pablo Celis	
"Hollywood"	2024	Bailen Estrada	
"Cats On the Ceiling"	2024	Olivia De Camps	
"Made It Awkward"	2024	Olivia De Camps	
"Dandelion" (with grentperez)	2025	Matt Sav	
"I Can Die Now"	2025	Sweetiepie	
"I Can Die Now" (ER Version)	2025	Joel Chamaa	
"The Suburbs"	2025	Charles Buxton-Leslie and Jordan Ruyi-Blanch	
"Wild Guess"	2025	Jackie! Zhou	
"Don't Say That"	2026	Jackie! Zhou	
"Hate Myself"	2026	Daniil Demichev	
"Debbie Don't Cry"	2026	Cedric Tang	
