= Kicking My Feet & Screaming =

Studio album by Ruel
- Released: 12 June 2026
- Length: 30:07
- Label: Recess; Giant
- Producer: Ammo; Kenneth Blume; Julian Bunetta; Lucy Healey; Joel Little; M-Phazes; John Ryan; Mark Schick; Dan Wilson

Ruel chronology
Kicking My Feet (2025)	Kicking My Feet & Screaming (2026)

Singles from Kicking My Feet & Screaming
- 1. "Don't Say That" Released: 20 March 2026; 2. "Hate Myself" Released: 24 April 2026; 3. "Debbie Don't Cry" Released: 22 May 2026; 4. "Faking Smiles" Released: 12 June 2026

Kicking My Feet & Screaming is the third studio album by Australian singer-songwriter Ruel, released on 12 June 2026 through Recess Records and Giant Music. It is a "sequel" to his second studio album, Kicking My Feet (2025). released on 12 June 2026 through Recess Records and Giant Music. The album will be supported with the European Kicking & Screaming Tour through October 2026.

== Background ==
In October 2025, Ruel released his second studio album Kicking My Feet. In March 2026, he announced its sequel, titled Kicking My Feet & Screaming, is scheduled for release on 12 June 2026. Ruel said "Soooo my new album Kicking & Screaming (Kicking My Feet pt. 2) is dropping June 12. 10 brand new songs from my heart to yours! 2 albums in 8 months". On streaming services, the first ten tracks are new, followed by tracks on the standard edition of Kicking My Feet. The new tracks, co-produced by Joel Little, Julian Bunetta, Kenny Beats, Dan Wilson, among others, have been described by Van Dijk as a continuation of his second studio album.

== Promotion ==
=== Singles ===
"Don't Say That" was released as the lead single from the album on 20 March 2026, coinciding with the album announcement. The song was previewed during Van Dijk's December 2025 performance at the Sydney Opera House.

"Hate Myself" was released on 24 April 2026. According to Scene Mag it "captures what it feels like to love someone who is bad for you and choosing to stay until you start resenting yourself more than them".

"Debbie Don't Cry" was released on 22 May 2026. Ruel said the song "began almost accidentally during a late-night writing session that started 'kind of as a joke' before quickly turning into a favourite." Deb Pelser from Backseat Mafia said of the single, "Even at its most melodic, 'Debbie Don't Cry' feels unsettled, caught somewhere between reassurance and regret."

"Faking Smiles" was released on 12 June 2026 and examines the contradictions between the masks we wear. Ruel explores the realness of heartache compounded by the emotional toll of gritted teeth and empty smiles Upon release, Ruel said, "The song has definitely lived a lot of lives. It started off as just a simple guitar ballad but after we sped it up by about 30bpm it evolved into a sort of retro The Cure throwback, paying homage to the sounds of the 80s."

== Track listing ==
Credits are adapted from Tidal.

Disc 1
No.	Title	Writer(s)	Producer(s)	Length
1.	"Hate Myself"	Ruel van Dijk; Jackson Morgan; Kenneth Charles Blume III	Kenneth Blume	2:32
2.	"In Your Mind"	Van Dijk; Sean Douglas; Mark Landon; Anthony Rossomando	M-Phazes	3:24
3.	"Faking Smiles"	Van Dijk; Julian Bunetta; Lucy Healey; John Ryan	Bunetta^{[p]}; Healey^{[p]}; Ryan^{[p]}	3:04
4.	"I Didn't Love You Anyway"	Van Dijk; Pablo Bowman; Andrew Jackson; Mark Schick	Schick	2:49
5.	"Can I Have It Back?"	Van Dijk; Blume; Bunetta; Ryan	Blume; Bunetta; Ryan	2:33
6.	"Don't Say That"	Van Dijk; Douglas; Joel Little	Little; M-Phazes^{[c]}	3:30
7.	"Debbie Don't Cry"	Van Dijk; Bowman; Jackson; Beau Nox; Schick	Schick^{[p]}	3:00
8.	"Talking to the Driver"	Van Dijk; Blume; Dan Wilson	Blume; Wilson; Sara Mulford^{[v]}	3:45
9.	"Since the Day You Left Me"	Van Dijk; Bunetta; Joshua Coleman; Jacob Kasher Hindlin	Ammo^{[p]}; Bunetta^{[p]}	3:10
10.	"What It Sounds Like"	Van Dijk; Erik Hassle; Elias Kapari; Zikai	M-Phazes	2:50
Total length:				30:07

Digital and streaming edition disc 2
No.	Title	Writer(s)	Producer(s)	Length
11.	"Only Ever"	Van Dijk; Bunetta; Healey; Ryan	Bunetta; Ryan; Matt Zara	2:31
12.	"Wild Guess"	Van Dijk; Leroy Clampitt; Wilson	Clampitt; Wilson	2:46
13.	"When You Walk in the Room"	Ryan	Ryan	1:58
14.	"I Can Die Now"	Van Dijk; Bunetta; Coleman; Ed Drewett; Hindlin; Schick	Ammo; Bunetta; Schick	2:51
15.	"Not What's Going On"	Van Dijk; Jake Greene; Tobias Jesso Jr.; Ryan	Ryan; Zara	2:54
16.	"Destroyer"	Van Dijk; Blume; Wilson	Blume; Mulford^{[c]}	3:08
17.	"The Suburbs"	Van Dijk; Elias Danielsen; Fransisca Hall; Landon; Chelsea Lena	Danielsen; M-Phazes	3:08
18.	"No News Is Good News"	Van Dijk; William Watson	Humble the Great	3:46
19.	"Even Angels Won't"	Van Dijk; Jackson; Wilson	Wilson	3:17
20.	"Kicking My Feet"	Van Dijk; Danielsen; Landon; Annie Schindel	Danielsen; M-Phazes	3:18
21.	"DST (Outro)"	Van Dijk; Douglas; Little	Taka Perry	0:52
Total length:				30:29; 60:36

=== Notes ===
- ^{^[p]} indicates a producer and vocal producer
- ^{^[c]} indicates a co-producer
- ^{^[v]} indicates a vocal producer

== Personnel ==
Credits are adapted from Tidal.

=== Musicians ===
- Ruel – vocals (all tracks), background vocals (tracks 6, 11, 14, 15), guitar (7, 12), theremin (8), piano (19)
- Kenneth Blume – drums (1, 5); bass, guitar (1, 16); percussion (8)
- Sean Douglas – background vocals (2), piano (6)
- Anthony Cappeto – bass (2, 10)
- Jonah Cuddy – guitar (2)
- Alex Lamb – keyboards (2)
- John Ryan – guitar (3, 5, 11, 13, 15), keyboards (3, 11, 15), bass (5, 11, 13, 15); piano, programming, synthesizer (3); background vocals, drums, percussion (11, 13, 15)
- Julian Bunetta – bass (3, 9, 14), programming (3, 9), drums (3, 14), synthesizer (3); guitar, keyboards (9, 14); percussion (14)
- Lucy Healey – keyboards, piano, programming (3)
- Mark Schick – bass, guitar, keyboards (4, 7); piano (4), programming (7), drums (14)
- Pablo Bowman – drums (4)
- M-Phazes – drum programming (6), synthesizer (17), background vocals (20)
- Elias Danielsen – guitar (6, 20); background vocals, bass (20)
- Joel Little – bass, drum programming, guitar, synthesizer (6)
- Sam de Jong – drums (6)
- Rob Moose – violin, viola (6)
- Dan Wilson – piano (8, 12), bass (8, 19); string ensemble, synthesizer, Wurlitzer (8); guitar (12, 16, 19), drums (12)
- Joe Avio – guitar (8, 19)
- Aaron Sterling – drums (8)
- Stevie Blacke – string ensemble (8)
- Ammo – programming (9); drums, guitar (14)
- Nick Lamb – piano (10, 17), synthesizer (17)
- Josh Shpak – horn (10)
- Matt Zara – background vocals, bass, drums, guitar, keyboards, percussion (11, 15)
- Leroy Clampitt – acoustic guitar, bass, electric guitar (12)
- John Carroll Kirby – Rhodes piano (12)
- Max Bassin – drums (16)
- William James Watson – background vocals, bass, drums, guitar (18)
- Sara Mulford – piano, synthesizer (19)
- Quincy Bunn – drums (20)
- Taka Perry – bass, guitar, synthesizer (21)
- Theodore Lee – keyboards (21)

=== Technical ===
- Kenneth Blume – engineering (1, 5)
- M-Phazes – engineering (2)
- Jeff Gunnell – engineering (3, 5, 11, 13, 15)
- Julian Bunetta – engineering (3, 9)
- John Ryan – engineering (3)
- Mark Schick – engineering (4, 7), mastering (4)
- Joel Little – engineering (6)
- Mark Rankin – engineering (6)
- Rob Moose – engineering (6)
- Sara Mulford – engineering (8, 16)
- Aaron Sterling – engineering (8)
- Dan Wilson – engineering (8)
- Joe Avio – engineering (8)
- Ammo – engineering (9)
- M-Phazes – engineering (17)
- Garrett Duncan – engineering assistance (6)
- Alex Ghenea – mixing (1–20)
- Taka Perry – mixing (21)
- Nathan Dantzler – mastering (1–3, 5–21)
- Harrison Tate – mastering assistance (14)

== Charts ==
Chart performance for Kicking My Feet & Screaming
Chart (2026)	Peak position
Australian Albums (ARIA)	25
New Zealand Albums (RMNZ)	24

== Release history ==
Kicking My Feet & Screaming release history
Region	Date	Format(s)	Label	Catalogue	Ref.
Various	12 June 2026	CD; vinyl; digital download; streaming	Recess; Giant	REC02CD	
