= Cats on the Ceiling =

Single by Ruel
- Released: 18 October 2024
- Length: 3:33
- Label: Recess; Giant
- Composers: Ruel Vincent Van Dijk; Elias Danielsen; Sam Romans; Jake Torrey; Mark Landon
- Lyricists: Ruel Vincent Van Dijk; Elias Danielsen; Sam Romans; Jake Torrey; Mark Landon
- Producers: M-Phazes; Joshua Shpak

Ruel singles chronology
| "Call Out My Name" (2024) | "Cats on the Ceiling" (2024) | "Santa Doesn't Know You Like I Do" (2024) |

Music video
- "Cats on the Ceiling" on YouTube

"Cats on the Ceiling" is a song recorded by Australian singer-songwriter, Ruel. It was released on 18 October 2024 through Recess Records and Giant Music. It was Ruel's first original solo track since "I Don't Wanna Be Like You" in March 2023.

== Background and composition ==
"Cats on the Ceiling" was written by Ruel Vincent Van Dijk, Elias Danielsen, Sam Romans, Jake Torrey, Mark Landon, with the latter serving as the co-producer of the song under his stage name, M-Phazes, alongside Joshua Shpak.

On the single release, Ruel commented: "I think there is so much more out there for us to experience in this life if we can just 'let go' of all that pent up self-control from time to time. I wrote 'Cats' to express the joy that comes from giving in to the great unknown and I want people to be able interpret that in whatever way feels good to them."

== Music video ==
A music video directed by Olivia De Camps was released on 18 October 2024, and centers on Ruel getting a buzz cut.

== Reception ==
The Note called it a "joyous and shiny pop tune addressing love, loss and letting go."

Nicole Otero from Euphoriazine said "'Cats on the Ceiling' opens with a shiny pop production that comes with buoyancy and makes you feel like you're floating. Also saying "The song also comes with a very specific narrative that expands onto the relationship of two people bringing the best out of each other, a whimsical concept very well presented."

== Track listings ==
- Digital download and streaming
1. "Cats on the Ceiling" — 3:33
- Digital download and streaming (Purrfectly Altered)
1. "Cats on the Ceiling" — 3:33
2. "Cats on the Ceiling" (acoustic) — 3:32
3. "Cats on the Ceiling" (catnip version) — 3:04
4. "Cats on the Ceiling" (catnap version) — 4:22
5. "Cats on the Ceiling" (acapella) — 3:33
6. "Cats on the Ceiling" (hisstrumental) — 3:33
- 12" Record Store Day 2025 Exclusive

Side A:

1. "Cats on the Ceiling"
2. "Cats on the Ceiling" (Stripped)
3. "Bonus Track #1"

Side B:

1. "Made it Awkward"
2. "Made it Awkward" (Stripped)
3. Bonus Track #1

== Personnel ==
Credits adapted from Apple Music.

- Ruel Vincent Van Dijk – vocals, composer, lyrics
- Elias Danielsen – composer, lyrics, guitar
- Sam Romans – composer, lyrics
- Jake Torrey – composer, lyrics
- M-Phazes (Mark Landon) – producer, composer, lyrics, synthesizer, drums, percussion, drum machine
- Joshua Shpak – producer, trumpet, keyboards, synthesizer, background vocals, guitar
- Jack Siegel – guitar
- Pera Krstajic – bass
- Adam Moore – guitar, background Vocals
- Meredith Moore – keyboards, background vocals
- Leonard "Kaeyos" Latouche – drums
- Philip Saabye – mastering engineer, mixing engineer

== Charts ==
Chart performance for "Cats on the Ceiling"
| Chart (2024) | Peak position |
|---|---|
| New Zealand Hot Singles (RMNZ) | 39 |

== Release history ==
"Cats on the Ceiling" release history
| Region | Date | Format(s) | Label | Version | Ref. |
|---|---|---|---|---|---|
| Various | 18 October 2024 | Digital download; streaming | Recess Records; Virgin Music Group; Giant Music | Original | |
| Various | 18 December 2024 | Digital download; streaming | Recess Records; Virgin Music Group; Giant Music | Purrfectly Altered | |
| Australia | April 2025 | 12" vinyl | Recess Records; Virgin Music Group; Giant Music | Record Store Exclusive | |
