= Sarah Aarons =

Australian songwriter (born 1994)

- Born: Sarah Paige Aarons; 4 October 1994 (age 32); Melbourne, Victoria, Australia
- Genres: Pop; dance; rock
- Occupation: Songwriter
- Label: Sony ATV Publishing

Sarah Paige Aarons (born 4 October 1994, previously known as Paige IV and sometimes simply as Sarah) is an Australian songwriter. Originally from Bentleigh, Melbourne, she attended McKinnon Secondary College in McKinnon and was taught singing as a preteen/teen at King David. Now based in Los Angeles, Aarons is signed to Sony ATV Publishing. She co-wrote "Stay" by Zedd and Alessia Cara and "The Middle" by Zedd, Maren Morris and Grey, which both went to No. 1 on Mainstream Top 40 and were each certified double platinum in the US. In 2019, Aarons was nominated for Song of the Year at the 61st Annual Grammy Awards for her work on "The Middle".

In Australia, Aarons had acclaimed success with the breakout song "Keeping Score" by LDRU, "Frozen" by Pon Cho and Cosmo's Midnight's "History," which in turn has become the most played song on Triple J in 2017. She has also received three ARIA Awards for her work with LDRU and has gone double platinum in Australia.

In 2017, Aarons was appointed one of APRA AMCOS Ambassadors and was included in LA Weekly's 20 hottest current songwriters. At the APRA Music Awards of 2018 she won Breakthrough Songwriter of the Year, she was also nominated for Country Work of the Year for the track, "House", alongside co-writers Brooke McClymont, Mollie McClymont, Samantha McClymont and Michael Fatkin.

In 2018, Aarons had her right leg amputated due to severe rheumatoid arthritis, an autoimmune condition that causes pain and swelling of the joints.

At the 2019 APRA Awards, Aarons won Songwriter of the Year as well as Most Played Australian Work, Rock Work of the Year and Dance Work of the Year.

The songwriter won Song of the Year at the APRA Music Awards of 2023 for co-writing "Say Nothing" (2022) with fellow Australian (and the song's performer) Flume.

== Selected discography ==
indicates a background vocal contribution.

indicates an un-credited lead vocal contribution.

indicates a credited vocal/featured artist contribution.

Year	Artist	Album	Song	Co-written with
2015	Smizzy	The Cover	"Problems Aside" (featuring Paige IV)	Martin Brown, Luke Rundle, Timothy Carr, Paul Conrad
2015	LDRU	Sizzlar	"Keeping Score" (featuring Paige IV)	Drew Carmody
2016	Jai Waetford	Heart Miles	"Living Not Dreaming"	Jai Waetford, Michael Fatkin
2016	Jai Waetford	Heart Miles	"Worlds"	Jai Waetford, Michael Fatkin
2016	PON CHO	Non-album single	"Lonely Walls" (featuring Paige IV)	Kevin Kerr
2016	Emmalyn	Non-album single	"Hungover"	Emmalyn Estrada, Brett McLaughlin, Jordan Palmer
2016	PON CHO	Non-album single	"Frozen" (featuring Paige IV)	Kevin Kerr
2016	Breathe Carolina & IZII	Non-album single	"Echo (Let Go)"	Anthony Egizii, David Musumeci
2017	Cosmo's Midnight	What Comes Next	"History"	Cosmo Liney, Patrick Liney
2017	Lost Kings	Non-album single	"Quit You" (featuring Tinashe)	Robert Abisi, Norris Shanholz, Sean Myer
2017	Zedd	TBA	"Stay" (with Alessia Cara)	Anton Zaslavski, Anders Froen, Jonnali Parmenius, Linus Wiklund, Alessia Caracciolo
2017	Mabel	Bedroom EP	"Bedroom"	Mabel McVey, Thomas Hull
2017	LDRU	Sizzlar	"The Calling"	Drew Carmody
2017	Jessie Ware	Glasshouse	"Alone"	Jessica Ware, Thomas Hull
2017	Galantis	The Aviary	"Tell Me You Love Me" (with Throttle)	Christian Karlsson, Linus Eklow, Jimmy "Svidden" Koitzsch, Henrik Jonback, Robert Bergin, Eddie Jenkins
2017	Demi Lovato	Tell Me You Love Me	"Lonely" (featuring Lil Wayne)	Dijon Mcfarlane, Niholas Audino, Lewis Hughes, Te Whiti Warbrick, Dwayne Carter Jr.
2017	Demi Lovato	Tell Me You Love Me	"Smoke & Mirrors"	Demetria Lovato, Benjamin Abraham
2017	Guy Sebastian	Conscious	"Drink Driving"	Guy Sebastian, Bastian Langebaek
2017	Madison Beer	As She Pleases EP	"Say It to My Face"	Dayyon Drinkard, Frederik Ball
2017	Camila Cabello	Bright: The Album	"Crown" (with Grey)	Camila Cabello, Kyle Trewartha, Michael Trewartha
2018	Zedd	TBA	"The Middle" (with Maren Morris and Grey)	Anton Zaslavski, Kyle Trewartha, Michael Trewartha, Stefan Johnson, Jordan Johnson, Marcus Lomax
2018	Whethan	Fifty Shades Freed OST	"High" (with Dua Lipa)	Ethan Snoreck, Dua Lipa, Jonathan Hill
2018	Bobi Andonov	Non-album single	"Smoke"	Bobby Andonov, Samuel Watters, Louis Biancaniello, Dylan William
2018	SeeB	Nice to Meet You EP	"Drink About" (featuring Dagny)	Simen Eriksrud, Espen Borg, Joakim Haukaas, Alex Hope, Thomas Hull
2018	Alina Baraz	The Color of You	"Tainted"	Alina Baraz, Ajay Bhattacharya
2018	The Rubens	Lo La Ru	"Never Ever" (featuring Sarah)	Samuel Margin, Elliott Margin
2018	Peking Duk	Reprisal EP	"Fire"	Adan Hyde, Reuben Styles, Samuel Littlemore
2018	Lykke Li	So Sad So Sexy	"Sex Money Feelings Die"	Li Zachrisson, Ilsey Juber, James Ryan Ho, Dacoury Natche, Thomas Hull
2018	Ruel	Ready EP	"Younger"	Ruel van Dijk, Mark Landon, Larry Griffin Jr., JaVohn Griffin
2018	Cosmo's Midnight	What Comes Next	"Talk to Me" (featuring Tove Styrke)	Cosmo Liney, Patrick Liney
2018	Ruel	Ready EP	"Intro"	Ruel van Dijk, Mark Landon, Larry Griffin Jr.
2018	Odette	To a Stranger	"Lights On"	Georgia Sallybanks, Alex Hope
2018	Zedd	TBA	"Happy Now" (with Elley Duhé)	Anton Zaslavski, Jonnali Parmenius, Linus Wiklund
2018	David Guetta	7	"Don't Leave Me Alone" (featuring Anne-Marie)	Pierre Guetta, Jonnali Parmenius, Linus Wiklund
2018	Gryffin	Gravity	"Tie Me Down" (with Elley Duhé)	Daniel Griffith, Badrilla Bourelly, Aaron Forbes, Jussi Karvinen, Nathaniel Cyphert
2018	Example	Bangers & Ballads	"Headlights"	Elliot Gleave, Andy Sheldrake
2018	Noah Cyrus	Good Cry EP	"Mad at You" (with Gallant)	Noah Cyrus, Thomas Hull
2018	Nao	Saturn	"Drive and Disconnect"	Neo Jessica Joshua, Daniel Traynor, Ajay Bhattacharya, Jeff Gitelman
2018	Khalid	Suncity EP	"Vertigo"	Khalid Robinson, Ryan Vojtesak, Jamil Chammas, Jonathan Hill, Rogét Chahayed
2018	MØ	Forever Neverland	"I Want You"	Karen Marie Ørsted, Ajay Bhattacharya
2018	Louis the Child	Kids at Play EP	"Breaking News" (featuring Raye)	Frederic Kennett, Robert Hauldren, Rachel Keen
2018	Kelsey Lu	Blood	"Due West"	Kelsey Lu, Jeff Kleinman, Michael Uzowuru, Rodaidh McDonald, William Boston
2019	Maren Morris	Girl	"Girl"	Maren Morris, Greg Kurstin
2019	Maren Morris	Girl	"Common" (featuring Brandi Carlile)	Maren Morris, Greg Kurstin
2019	Meg Mac	Hope	"Something Tells Me"	Megan McInerney
2019	Meg Mac	Hope	"Head Away"	Megan McInerney
2019	John Legend	Non-album single	"Preach"	John Stephens, Greg Kurstin
2019	Khalid	Free Spirit	"Paradise"	Khalid Robinson, Jonathan Hill, Dacoury Natche
2019	Khalid	Free Spirit	"Outta My Head" (with John Mayer)	Khalid Robinson, John Mayer, Jamil Chammas, Jonathan Hill
2019	Khalid	Free Spirit	"Free Spirit"	Khalid Robinson, Ryan Vojtesak, Jamil Chammas, Justin Scott Lucas
2019	Khalid	Free Spirit	"Bluffin'"	Khalid Robinson, Ryan Vojtesak, Jamil Chammas
2019	Miquela	Non-album single	"Right Back"	Miquela Sousak, Ethan Snoreck, Jordan Palmer
2019	Ruel	Free Time	"Real Thing (Ruel song)"	Ruel van Dijk, Mark Landon
2019	Ruel	Free Time	"Painkiller"	Ruel van Dijk, Mark Landon
2019	Jonas Brothers	Happiness Begins	"Happy When I'm Sad"	Nicholas Jonas, Joel Little
2019	Mabel	High Expectations	"FML"	Mabel McVey, Kelly Kiara, Marlon McVey-Roudette, Warren Felder
2019	Hilltop Hoods	The Great Expanse	"Exit Sign" (featuring Illy & Ecca Vandal)	Matthew Lambert, Daniel Smith, Alasdair Murray, Andrew Burford, Barry Francis
2019	Foster the People	Pick U Up EP	"Imagination"	Mark Foster, Oliver Goldstein, Josh Abraham, Austin Tirado
2019	Foster the People	Pick U Up EP	"Pick U Up"	Mark Foster, Joel Little
2019	Kaskade	Non-album single	"With You" (with Meghan Trainor)	Ryan Raddon, Finn Bjarnson, Richard Beynon, Thomas Shaw, Samuel Gerongco, Robert Gerongco
2019	Ingrid Michaelson	Stranger Songs	"Pretty"	Ingrid Michaelson, Alexandra Robotham
2019	Gallant	Sweet Insomnia	"Crimes"	Christopher Gallant, Ajay Bhattacharya, Benjamin Abraham
2019	Gallant	Sweet Insomnia	"Celine"	Christopher Gallant, Ben Ash
2019	Cashmere Cat	Princess Catgirl	"Without You"	Magnus August Hoiberg, Benjamin Levin, Kevin Esmenda, Julia Michaels, Justin Tranter, Mattias Larsson, Robin Fredriksson, Oscar Holter
2019	Bea Miller	Non-album single	"Never Gonna Like You" (featuring Snakehips)	Oliver Dickinson, James David, Joe Janiak
2020	Halsey	Manic	"I Hate Everybody"	Ashley Frangipane, Noonie Bao, Peder Losnegård, Benjamin Levin, Magnus August Høiberg, Nathan Perez, Finneas O'Connell
2020	Hermitude	Non-album single	"Too High"	Angus Stuart, Luke Dubber
2020	SZA and Justin Timberlake	TROLLS: World Tour (Original Motion Picture Soundtrack)	"The Other Side"	Ludwig Göransson, Max Martin, Justin Timberlake, SZA
2020	Justin Timberlake, Anna Kendrick, Kelly Clarkson, Mary J Blige, Anderson .Paak, and Kenan Thompson	TROLLS: World Tour (Original Motion Picture Soundtrack)	"Just Sing"	Ludwig Göransson, Max Martin, Justin Timberlake
2020	Gracie Abrams	Minor	"21"	Gracie Abrams, Joel Little
2020	Gracie Abrams	Minor	"I Miss You I'm Sorry"	Gracie Abrams
2020	Childish Gambino	3.15.20	"Time" (featuring Ariana Grande)	Donald Glover, Dacoury Natche, Ludwig Göransson, Ariana Grande, Chukwudi Hodge
2020	Guy Sebastian	T.R.U.T.H.	"I'm Your Man"	Anthony Egizii, David Musumeci, David Ryan Harris
2020	Whethan and Grouplove	Fantasy	"Upside Down"	Ethan Snoreck, Hannah Hooper, Chris Zucconi, Tim Randolph
2020	Tracee Ellis Ross	The High Note (Original Motion Picture Soundtrack)	"Love Myself"	Greg Kurstin
2020	Kelvin Harrison Jr.	The High Note (Original Motion Picture Soundtrack)	"Track 8"	Lennon Stella, Ajay Bhattacharyya
2020	Tracee Ellis Ross and Kelvin Harrison Jr.	The High Note (Original Motion Picture Soundtrack)	"Like I Do"	—N/a
2020	The Chicks	Gaslighter	"For Her"	Emily Strayer, Martie Maguire, Natalie Maines, Ariel Rechtshaid
2020	Wafia	Good Things	"Hurricane"	Wafia Al-Rikabi, Jamil Chammas
2020	Joji	Nectar	"Daylight" (with Diplo)	George Miller, Greg Kurstin, Thomas Pentz, Maximilian Jaeger
2020	Ruel	Bright Lights, Red Eyes	"As Long As You Care"	Ruel Vincent van Dijk, Mark Landon
2020	Ruel	Bright Lights, Red Eyes	"Courage"	Ruel Vincent van Dijk, Mark Landon
2020	Ruel	Bright Lights, Red Eyes	"Distance"	Ruel Vincent van Dijk, Mark Landon
2020	Ruel	Bright Lights, Red Eyes	"Say It Over" (featuring Cautious Clay)	Ruel Vincent van Dijk, Mark Landon, Joshua Karpeh, Hans Galvez
2020	Ruel	Bright Lights, Red Eyes	"Up To Something"	Ruel Vincent van Dijk, Mark Landon, Simon Hessmann
2020	Eliza & The Delusionals	TBA	"Sentimental"	Eliza Klatt, Ashley Martin, Kurt Skuse, Ruby Lee, John Hill
2021	The Rubens	0202	"State of My Mind"	Elliott Margin, Izaac Margin, Samuel Margin
2021	Zara Larsson	Poster Girl	"Need Someone"	Noonie Bao, Mattias Larsson, Robin Fredriksson
2021	Ingrid Michaelson and Zayn	TBA	"Begin Again"	Ingrid Michaelson, Zayn Malik
2021	Holly Humberstone	The Walls Are Way Too Thin	"Haunted House"	Holly Humberstone, Rob Milton
2021	Miguel	Art Dealer Chic 4	"Thinking Out Loud"	Miguel Pimentel, JaVohn Griffin, Justus West
2021	Peking Duk		"Chemicals"	Reuben Styles, Adam Hyde
2021	Tate McRae and Khalid	TBA	"Working"	Tate McRae, Khalid Robinson, Joel Little
2021	Noah Kahan	I Was / I Am	"Fear of Water"	Noah Kahan, Joel Little
2021	Dillon Francis	Happy Machine	"In Case I Fall Asleep" (featuring Gracey)	Dillon Francis, Grace Barker, Jeremy Malvin, Philip von Boch Scully
2021	Demi Lovato	Non-album single	"Unforgettable (Tommy's Song)"	Demi Lovato, Andrew "Pop" Wansel, Warren "Oak" Felder
2021	Kito	Blossom	"Skin & Bones" (featuring Winona Oak)	Maaike Kito Lebbing
2021	Gracie Abrams	This Is What it Feels Like	"Better"	Gracie Abrams, Joel Little
2021	Gracie Abrams	This Is What it Feels Like	"For Real This Time"	Gracie Abrams, Joel Little
2021	Gracie Abrams	This Is What it Feels Like	"Wishful Thinking"	Gracie Abrams, Joel Little
2021	Justin Timberlake, Anna Kendrick, Anderson .Paak, Anthony Ramos, and Ester Dean	Trolls: Holiday in Harmony	"Together Now"	Justin Timberlake, Joseph Shirley
2022	Stephanie Poetri	TBA	"Picture Myself"	—N/a
2022	Flume	Palaces	"Say Nothing" (featuring May-a)	Harley Streten
2022	Maren Morris	Humble Quest	"Detour"	
2022	Wallows	Tell Me That It's Over	"At The End of the Day"	
2022	The Head and the Heart	Every Shade of Blue	"Pardigm"	
2022	Sigrid	How To Let Go	"Grow"	
2022	Eliza & the Delusionals	Now and Then	"Give You Everything"	
2022	Lykke Li	Eyeye	"Happy Hurts"	
2022	Lykke Li	Eyeye	"5D"	
2022	Halsey	TBA	"So Good"	
2022	5 Seconds of Summer	5SOS5	"Bleach"	
2022	5 Seconds of Summer	5SOS5	"Moodswings"	
2022	Reneé Rapp	Everything to Everyone	"Everything to Everyone"	Reneé Rapp, Cirkut
2023	Budjerah	TBA	"Therapy"	
2023	Miley Cyrus	Endless Summer Vacation	"Jaded"	Miley Cyrus, Greg Kurstin
2023	Flume	Arrived Anxious, Left Bored	"Sky Sky"	
2023	Portugal. The Man	Chris Black Changed My Life	"Thunderdome [W.T.A.]" (featuring Black Thought and Natalia Lafourcade)	
2023	Mura Masa	N/A	"Drugs"	
2023	Teezo Touchdown	How Do You Sleep At Night	"You Thought (featuring Janelle Monáe)"	
2023	Tate McRae	Think Later	"Plastic Palm Trees"	Tate McRae, Michael Pollack, Nick Long
2024	Nelly Furtado	7	"Honesty"	Nelly Furtado, SG Lewis, Orlando Highbottom
2024	Rachel Chinouriri	What a Devastating Turn of Events	"Dumb Bitch Juice"	Rachel Chinouriri, Cameron Warren, Dave Okumu
2024	Ravyn Lenae	Bird's Eye	"Genius", "Bad Idea", "One Wish", "Dream Girl", "Candy", "Love Is Blind", "Love Me Not", "From Scratch", "1 of 1", "Pilot", "Days"	Ravyn Lenae, Luke Titus, Steve Lacy
2024	NewJeans	How Sweet	"How Sweet"	250, Gigi, Elvira Anderfjärd, Oscar Scheller, Stella Bennett, Tove Burman, Danielle
2024	Childish Gambino	Bando Stone & the New World	"In the Night" (featuring Jorja Smith and Amaarae)	Donald Glover, Jorja Smith, Amaarae
2024	Foster the People	Paradise State of Mind	"Let Go"	Mark Foster
2024	Rosé	Rosie	"Stay a Little Longer"	Rosé, Andrew Wells
2024	070 Shake	Petrichor	"Pieces of You"	
2024	070 Shake	Petrichor	"Vagabond"	
2024	070 Shake	Petrichor	"Never Let Us Fade (featuring Cam)"	
2025	Hailee Steinfeld	Sinners (Original Motion Picture Soundtrack)	"Dangerous"	Ludwig Göransson
2025	Eem Triplin	Melody of A Memory	"23"	
2025	Giveon	Beloved	"Twenties (song)"	
2025	Giveon	Beloved	"Numb"	
2025	Cautious Clay	The Hours: Morning	"Tokyo Life (5am)"	
2025	Brenn!	Upstate	"Days on End"	
2025	Spacey Jane	If That Makes Sense	"Intro"	
2025	Spacey Jane	If That Makes Sense	"Whateverrrr"	
2025	Spacey Jane	If That Makes Sense	"How To Kill Houseplants"	
2025	Spacey Jane	If That Makes Sense	"Estimated Delivery"	
2025	Spacey Jane	If That Makes Sense	"ILY The Most"	
2025	Noah Rinker	Burning Daylight	"99"	
2025	Jake Minch	George	"UNICEF"	
2025	Joe Jonas	Music for People Who Believe in Love	"Water Under the Bridge"	
2025	Syd	TBA	"Die For This"	
2025	Lindsay Lohan	Freakier Friday (soundtrack)	"Baby"	
2025	Amaarae	Black Star	"Buy2Buy"	
2025	Amaarae	Black Star	"She Is My Drug"	
2025	Tame Impala	Deadbeat	"Dracula"	Tame Impala
2025	Tame Impala	Deadbeat	"Oblivion"	Tame Impala
2025	Tame Impala	Deadbeat	"Afterthought"	Tame Impala
2026	BTS	Arirang	"Merry Go Round"	Sam Homaee, Gregory Aldae Hein, Kevin Parker, RM, Suga, J-Hope, Derrick Milano, Pdogg
2026	Dahi	Black Boy (Alternative)	"How to Pray"	Amber Mark, Dahi, Danny McKinnon, Jonah Stevens, Kendrick Lamar
2026	Ravyn Lenae	Blue Island	"Reputation" (featuring Dominic Fike)	
2026	Gracie Abrams	Daughter from Hell	"Good Reason"	
2026	Michael Marcagi	Under the Streetlights	"Holding On To Something"	
2026	Rachel Chinouriri	I Think I Spoke Too Soon	"One Song Away from Crying"	

== Awards and nominations ==
Year	Award	Category	Work	Result
2016	APRA Music Awards of 2016	Best Music for an Advertisement	Rio 2016 Olympics	Nominated
2017	APRA Music Awards of 2017	Dance Work of the Year	"Keeping Score"	Nominated
2018	61st Annual Grammy Awards	Song of the Year	"The Middle"	Nominated
2018	APRA Music Awards of 2018	Breakthrough Songwriter of the Year	Herself	Won
2018	APRA Music Awards of 2018	Country Work of the Year	"House"	Nominated
2019	Vanda & Young Global Songwriting Competition	Vanda & Young Global Songwriting Competition	"The Middle"	2nd
2019	APRA Music Awards of 2019	Dance Work of the Year	"The Middle"	Won
2019	APRA Music Awards of 2019	Dance Work of the Year	"Tell Me You Love Me"	Nominated
2019	APRA Music Awards of 2019	Most Played Australian Work	"The Middle"	Won
2019	APRA Music Awards of 2019	Rock Work of the Year	"Never Ever"	Won
2019	APRA Music Awards of 2019	Songwriter of the Year	Herself	Won
2019	2019 iHeartRadio Music Awards	Songwriter of the Year	Herself	Nominated
2019	53rd Annual Country Music Association Awards	Song of the Year	"Girl"	Nominated
2019	J Awards of 2019	You Done Good Award	Herself	Nominated
2020	APRA Music Awards of 2020	Most Performed Country Work	"Girl"	Nominated
2020	APRA Music Awards of 2020	Most Performed Urban Work	"Exit Sign"	Nominated
2020	APRA Music Awards of 2020	Overseas Recognition: Los Angeles	Herself	Nominated
2020	APRA Music Awards of 2020	Songwriter of the Year: Los Angeles	Herself	Won
2022	Ivor Novello Awards	Best Song Musically and Lyrically	"Haunted House"	Nominated
2023	APRA Music Awards of 2023	Song of the Year	"Say Nothing"	Won
2023	APRA Music Awards of 2023	Most Performed Dance/Electronic Work	"Say Nothing"	Nominated
2024	APRA Music Awards of 2024	Song of the Year	"Therapy" (Sarah Aarons, Ajay Bhattacharyya)	Nominated
2024	APRA Music Awards of 2024	Most Performed Australian Work	"Therapy" (Sarah Aarons, Ajay Bhattacharyya)	Nominated
2024	APRA Music Awards of 2024	Most Performed Pop Work	"Therapy" (Sarah Aarons, Ajay Bhattacharyya)	Nominated
2025	APRA Music Awards of 2025	Most Performed Alternative Work	"Good Mood" by The Rubens (The Rubens and Sarah Aarons)	Nominated
2027	Grammy Award	Record Of The Year	"Dracula"	Nominated
