= Let the Grass Grow =

Single by Ruel

from the album 4th Wall
- Released: 11 March 2022
- Length: 2:55
- Label: RCA; Sont
- Songwriters: Ruel Vincent Van Dijk; PJ Harding
- Producer: M-Phazes

Ruel singles chronology
| "Growing Up Is " (2021) | "Let the Grass Grow" (2022) | "You Against Yourself" (2022) |

Visualizer
- "Let the Grass Grow" on YouTube

"Let the Grass Grow" (stylised in all caps) is a song by Australian singer-songwriter Ruel. The song was released on 11 March 2022 as the second single from his debut studio album, 4th Wall (2023).

== Background and release ==
"Let the Grass Grow" was written by Ruel Vincent Van Dijk, and PJ Harding. The song depicts Ruel's "dark thoughts" on the negative impact humans have had on Earth. The track was produced by Ruel's longtime collaborator Mark Landon, known professionally as M-Phazes, who also handled the song's vocal production. "Let the Grass Grow" appears as the track number eight on 4th Wall.

== Promotion ==
To promote the song, Ruel collaborated with director Joel Chamma on two accompanying videos. A visualizer was released alongside the song on 11 March 2022, which was shot in Byron Bay Australia while the singer was on a surfing retreat with The Surfrider Foundation. It was followed by an acoustic live performance video released on 22 April 2022.

== Personnel ==
Credits were adapted from Apple Music.

Performing artists

- Ruel – vocals
- M-Phazes – synthesizer, drum machine
- Aidan Rodriguez – keyboards, acoustic guitar
- Sean Hurley – bass
- Colin Munroe – background vocals

Composition and lyrics

- Ruel Vincent Van Dijk – songwriter
- P.J. Harding – songwriter

Production and engineer

- M-Phazes – vocal producer
- Eric J. Dubowsky – mixing engineer
- Matt Curtin – assistant engineer
- Dale Becker – mastering engineer
- Connor Hedge – engineer

== Charts ==
| Chart (2022) | Peak position |
|---|---|
| New Zealand Hot Singles (RMNZ) | 18 |

== Release history ==
List of release dates and formats
| Region | Date | Format(s) | Label | Ref. |
|---|---|---|---|---|
| Various | 11 March 2022 | Digital download; streaming | RCA; Sony Music Entertainment | |
