= As Long as You Care =

Single by Ruel

from the EP Bright Lights, Red Eyes
- Released: 11 September 2020
- Length: 3:13
- Label: RCA; Sony
- Songwriters: Ruel Vincent Van Djik; Mark Landon; Sarah Aarons
- Producer: M-Phazes

Ruel singles chronology
"Empty Love" (2020)	"As Long as You Care" (2020)	"Say It Over" (2020)

Music video
- "As Long As You Care" on YouTube

"As Long as You Care" is a song by English born Australian singer-songwriter Ruel. The song was released on 11 September 2020 as the lead single from his third EP, Bright Lights, Red Eyes, which was announced on the same day. In charted in Top 10 in New Zealand and Top 20 in Australia.

A translucent orange 7" vinyl was released on 14 July 2021, limited to 150 copies for Record Store Day 2021.

== Music video ==
The music video for "As Long as You Care" was directed by Grey Ghost and released on 10 September 2020. It features Ruel meandering around a 1970s-inspired house, while also playing various 70s television stereotypes on screens around the home, complimenting the smooth and groovy burn of the song itself.

== Critical reception ==
Vivien Topalovic from Live Wire AU said "The song feels like it's straight out of the 1970s with its pulsating bass line and wavy guitar riffs. Along with Ruel's smooth and buttery voice, it's a match made in psychedelic heaven."

== Track listing ==
7" (Sony Music Australia - 19439906307) Side A: "As Long as You Care"
Side B: "As Long as You Care" (instrumental)

== Charts ==
Chart performance for "As Long as You Care"
Chart (2020)	Peak position
Australian Artist (ARIA)	14
New Zealand Hot Singles (RMNZ)	8

== Certifications ==
Certifications for "As Long as You Care"
Region	Certification	Certified units/sales
Australia (ARIA)	Gold	35,000^{‡}
^{‡} Sales+streaming figures based on certification alone.
