= Don't Tell Me =

Don't Tell Me may refer to:

- "Don't Tell Me" (Avril Lavigne song), 2004
- "Don't Tell Me" (Blancmange song), 1984
- "Don't Tell Me" (Lee Ann Womack song), 1999
- "Don't Tell Me" (Madonna song), 2000
- "Don't Tell Me" (Ruel song), 2017
- "Don't Tell Me (What Love Can Do)", a song by Van Halen, 1995
- "Don't Tell Me", a song by Hoobastank from Every Man for Himself, 2006
