= The Suburbs (Ruel song) =

Single by Ruel

from the album Kicking My Feet
- Released: 22 August 2025
- Genre: Blues
- Length: 3:08
- Label: Recess; Giant
- Songwriters: Ruel Vincent Van Dijk; Elias Danielsen; Chelsea Lena; Fran Hall; Mark Landon
- Producers: Elias Danielsen; M-Phazes

Ruel singles chronology
"I Can Die Now" (2025)	"The Suburbs" (2025)	"Wild Guess" (2025)

Music video
- "The Suburbs" on YouTube

"The Suburbs" is a song recorded by Australian singer-songwriter, Ruel. It was released on 22 August 2025 as the second single from his second studio album, Kicking My Feet.

The song won first prize in the 2025 Vanda & Young Global Songwriting Competition.

== Composition ==
The song was written by Ruel Van Dijk, Chelsea Lena, Fran Hall, Elias Danielsen and Mark Landon (M-Phazes), with the latter two serving as the song producers. The song's lyrics address intimacy and the idea of a simpler life shared with a significant other. Following the song's release, Ruel shared his thoughts with Rolling Stone Australia on embracing a more personal songwriting style in his new material:

"It’s been pretty daunting to offer up this level of honesty in my songwriting but seeing the way it’s already connected so personally with fans has calmed my 'pre-album' nerves in a huge way."

— Ruel on the song, via Rolling Stone Australia

== Music video ==
A music video, directed by Charles Buxton-Leslie, and Jordan Ruyi-Blanch was released on 17 September 2025. The music video was filmed in Sydney and sees Ruel growing old in a suburban life.

== Reception ==
"The Suburbs" was met with positive reviews from music critics. Larisha Paul from Rolling Stone said "The bluesy record intertwines warm harmonies with propulsive production." Dale Melita from Scene magazine described the song as "dreamy, introspective, and unmistakably Ruel," and highlighted the artist’s "bold" evolution as a musician. The song is a finalist in the 2025 Vanda & Young Global Songwriting Competition.

== Track listing ==
- Digital download and streaming
1. "The Suburbs" – 3:08
2. "I Can Die Now" – 2:51
- Digital download and streaming (35 mph version)
1. "The Suburbs" (35 mph version) – 3:45
2. "The Suburbs" – 3:08
3. "I Can Die Now" (ER version) – 2:48
4. "I Can Die Now" – 2:51

== Personnel ==
Credits adapted from Apple Music.

- Ruel Vincent Van Dijk – vocals, songwriter
- Mark Landon (M-Phazes) – producer, songwriter, recording engineer, synthesiser
- Elias Danielsen – producer, songwriter, guitar, bass
- Chelsea Lena – songwriter
- Fran Hall – songwriter
- Nick Lamb – piano, synthesiser
- Alex Ghenea – mixing engineer
- Nathan Dantzler – mastering engineer

== Release history ==
"The Suburbs" release history
Region	Date	Format(s)	Label	Version	Ref.
Various	18 August 2025	Digital download; streaming	Recess Records; Virgin Music Group; Giant Music	Original	
Various	11 September 2025	Digital download; streaming	Recess Records; Virgin Music Group; Giant Music	35 mph Version	
