= The Way It Used to Be =

The Way It Used to Be may refer to:

== Songs ==
- "The Way It Used to Be" (Engelbert Humperdinck song), 1969
- "The Way It Used to Be" (Mike Posner song), 2013
- "The Way It Used to Be", a 2002 song by Not by Choice from Maybe One Day
- "The Way It Used to Be", a 2009 song by Pet Shop Boys from Yes
- "Wobegon (The Way It Used to Be)", a 1987 song by Chet Atkins from Sails
