= Kicking My Feet =

Studio album by Ruel
- Released: 17 October 2025
- Length: 30:29
- Labels: Recess; Giant
- Producers: Ammo; Kenneth Blume; Julian Bunetta; Leroy Clampitt; Elias Danielsen; Humble the Great; M-Phazes; Taka Perry; Mark Schick; Dan Wilson; Matt Zara

Ruel chronology
Adaptations (2024)	Kicking My Feet (2025)	Hate Myself (2026)

Ruel studio album chronology
4th Wall (2023)	Kicking My Feet (2025)	Kicking My Feet & Screaming (2026)

Singles from Kicking My Feet
- 1. "I Can Die Now" Released: 18 July 2025; 2. "The Suburbs" Released: 22 August 2025; 3. "Wild Guess" Released: 26 September 2025; 4. "Not What's Going On" Released: 17 October 2025; 5. "Destroyer" Released: 5 December 2025

Kicking My Feet is the second studio album by Australian singer-songwriter Ruel, released on 17 October 2025 through Recess Records and Giant Music. The album peaked at number 6 on the ARIA Charts.

It was ranked 22 in PopMatters top 25 Best Pop Albums of 2025.

== Background ==
Kicking My Feet is Van Dijk's follow-up to his debut studio album 4th Wall, released in 2023. On 22 August 2025, Van Dijk announced that his second studio album would be released on 17 October 2025. He revealed that following the conclusion of his tour in 2023, he did not initially feel ready to begin work on a new project. However, after collaborating with new partners, he resumed writing. Van Dijk stated that he aimed to "push himself" artistically with this album, ultimately recording over 200 songs during the process.

"When I started writing again, after being on tour for the most part of 2023, I didn’t know if I was ready for album #2. I’d just signed with Giant Music, and I was still figuring out who I wanted to be as an artist. But the process of writing this record- finding my closest collaborators, writing and rewriting over 200 songs, chasing ideas that felt more honest and real to me than ever… it pushed me to drop my guard and say what I actually mean. And that’s what this album is, a collection of songs where I share things I truly truly mean.."

— Ruel announcing the album, via Instagram

On the album release day, Ruel said to Cosmopolitan: "There's no perfect message that I want to give anyone, because anyone can interpret something the way they want to. But on each song, I'm clearly trying to make you feel something, and I just hope it heightens that emotion on each one."

== Composition ==
The album contains eleven-tracks, and includes contributions from producers Julian Bunetta, Joel Little, Mark Schick, Ammo, M-Phazes, Leroy Clampitt, Dan Wilson, and Elias Danielsen.

== Promotion ==
=== Singles ===
The album spawned three singles. "I Can Die Now", released on 17 July 2025, served as the album lead single. It was followed by "The Suburbs" and "Wild Guess" as the second and third singles in 2025. "Not What's Going On" was released alongside the album on 17 October 2025. "Destroyer" was released on 5 December 2025.

=== Tour ===
Kicking My Feet Tour
- Tour by Ruel
- Promotional poster
- Location: North America and South America
- Associated album: Kicking My Feet
- Start date: 9 February 2026
- End date: 8 April 2026
- Legs: 1
- No. of shows: 24 in North America; 4 in South America; 28 total
- Supporting acts: Arthur Hill; Mercer Henderson

Ruel concert chronology
- 4th Wall World Tour (2023); Kicking My Feet Tour (2026)

To promote the album, Van Dijk is set to embark on his upcoming Kicking My Feet Tour from 9 February to 6 April 2026 across North America and South America.

== Reception ==
Professional ratings
Review scores
Source	Rating
Dork	3/5 stars
PopMatters	8/10

Kicking My Feet was met with positive reviews from music critics. Matthew Dwyer from PopMatters noted that the album allows Ruel to "stand out in a crowded field of male pop stars", praising his "sharp take on an existing formula", stating that "while most pop stars could spend an entire album cycle deciding how confessional they want to be, he has struck an innate balance between fame and privacy as he has gradually ascended to stardom." Dwyer further praised the album's "shiny, highly-production", Ruel's husky vocals, and his songwriting abilities.

Jade Kennedy from The Music Network said the album showcases "a confident evolution in sound and songwriting", adding "Kicking My Feet sees Ruel blending emotional depth with contemporary pop production".

Ella Sangster from Cosmopolitan said, "Kicking My Feet is impressively cohesive; with sleek, sharp pop and R&B inflections, threaded with lyrics demonstrating an introspection that only really comes from growing up."

== Track listing ==
Kicking My Feet track listing
No.	Title	Writer(s)	Producer(s)	Length
1.	"Only Ever"	Ruel Van Dijk; Julian Bunetta; Lucy Healy; John Ryan	Bunetta; Ryan; Matt Zara	2:31
2.	"Wild Guess"	Van Dijk; Leroy Clampitt; Dan Wilson	Clampitt; Wilson	2:46
3.	"When You Walk in the Room"	Ryan	Ryan	1:58
4.	"I Can Die Now"	Van Dijk; Bunetta; Joshua Coleman; Ed Drewett; Jacob Kasher Hindlin; Mark Schick	Bunetta; Schick; Ammo	2:51
5.	"Not What's Going On"	Van Dijk; Tobias Jesso Jr.; Jake Greene; Ryan	Ryan	2:54
6.	"Destroyer"	Van Dijk; Kenneth Charles Blume III; Wilson	Blume	3:08
7.	"The Suburbs"	Van Dijk; Elias Danielsen; Fran Hall; Mark Landon; Chelsea Lena	Danielsen; M-Phazes	3:08
8.	"No News Is Good News"	Van Dijk; William James Watson	Humble the Great	3:46
9.	"Even Angels Won't"	Van Dijk; Andrew Jackson; Wilson	Wilson	3:17
10.	"Kicking My Feet"	Van Dijk; Danielsen; Landon; Annie Schindel	Danielsen; M-Phazes	3:18
11.	"DST (Outro)"	Van Dijk; Sean Douglas; Joel Little	Taka Perry	0:52
Total length:				30:29

Kicking My Feet (expanded) track listing
No.	Title	Length
12.	"Only Ever" (stripped)	2:19
13.	"Wild Guess" (stripped)	2:42
14.	"Destroyer" (stripped)	2:34
15.	"The Suburbs" (stripped)	2:19
16.	"Kicking My Feet" (stripped)	3:11

== Personnel ==
Credits adapted from Tidal.

- Ruel – vocals (all tracks), background vocals (tracks 1, 4, 5), guitar (2), piano (9)
- Nathan Dantzler – mastering
- Alex Ghenea – mixing (1–10)
- John Ryan – background vocals, bass, drums, guitar, percussion (1, 3, 5); keyboards (1, 5)
- Matt Zara – background vocals, bass, drums, guitar, keyboards, percussion (1, 5)
- Dan Wilson – guitar (2, 6, 9), drums (2, 9), piano (2)
- Leroy Clampitt – acoustic guitar, bass, electric guitar (2)
- John Carroll Kirby – Rhodes piano (2)
- Julian Bunetta – bass, drums, guitar, keyboards, percussion (4)
- Joshua Coleman – guitar (4)
- Mark Schick – guitar (4)
- Harriston Tate – mastering assistance (4)
- Kenneth Blume – bass, guitar (6)
- Max Bassin – drums (6)
- M-Phazes – synthesizer, engineering (7); background vocals (10)
- Nick Lamb – piano, synthesizer (7)
- William James Watson – background vocals, bass, drums, guitar (8)
- Joe Avio – guitar (9)
- Sara Mulford – piano, synthesizer (9)
- Elias Danielsen – background vocals, bass, guitar (10)
- Theremin – bells, guitar (10)
- Quincy Bunn – drums (10)
- Taka Perry – bass, guitar, synthesizer, mixing (11)
- Theodore Lee – keyboards (11)

== Charts ==
Chart performance for Kicking My Feet
Chart (2025)	Peak position
Australian Albums (ARIA)	6
UK Physical Albums (OCC)	100
UK Independent Albums (Official Charts)	36
US Top Album Sales (Billboard)	36

== Release history ==
Kicking My Feet release history
Region	Date	Format(s)	Label	Catalogue	Ref.
Various	17 October 2025	CD; vinyl; cassette; digital download; streaming	Recess; Giant	REC01CD	
Various	19 October 2025 (expanded)	digital download; streaming	Recess, Giant		
