= Vanda & Young Global Songwriting Competition =

- Awarded for: acknowledges great songwriting
- Country: Australia
- Presented by: Albert Music and APRA AMCOS
- First award: 2009; 17 years ago
- Final award: Current
- Website: www.apraamcos.com.au/about/supporting-the-industry/competitions/vanda-young-global-songwriting-competition

The Vanda & Young Global Songwriting Competition is an annual competition that "acknowledges great songwriting whilst supporting and raising money for Nordoff-Robbins" and is coordinated by Albert Music and APRA AMCOS. The competition awards a 1st, 2nd and 3rd place and was named after iconic writers Harry Vanda and George Young, known as Vanda & Young.

The competition is Australia's most prestigious and lucrative songwriting competition. The inaugural competition took place in December 2009, with Megan Washington winning with the song "How to Tame Lions".

== Background ==
In 2009 independent music company Albert Music collaborated with APRA AMCOS to establish an international songwriter's competition. The competition open to all songwriters – published or unpublished, and all proceeds raised by the Vanda & Young Global Song writing Competition go to not-for-profit organisation Noro Music Therapy Australia (NRMTA), which uses music therapy to help people cope with the struggles of living with a wide range of needs.

The winners are selected by a panel of experts from a cross-section of industries.

The 2014's competition include an Encouragement Award with a cash prize of $2,000 which was donated by 2013 winners, The Preatures.

As of 2020, 1st place receives a $50,000 cash prize, 2nd place receives $10,000 and 3rd place receives $5,000. The Emerging Songwriter winner receives $5,000 courtesy Australasian Music Publishers Association.

== Past winners ==
List of top three from each year as listed on the APRA AMCOS website.

Year	Gold	Silver	Bronze	Unpublished prize
2009	Megan Washington – "How to Tame Lions"	Eskimo Joe (Kav Temperley, Joel Quartermain and Stuart Macleod) – "Foreign Land"	Caitlin Harnett – "Tying Hands and Holding Shoelaces"	—N/a
2010	No competition			
2011	Kimbra – "Cameo Lover"	Catherine Britt – "Sweet Emmylou"	Gotye – "Somebody That I Used to Know"	—N/a
2012	No competition			
2013	Isabella Manfredi (The Preatures) – "Is This How You Feel?"	Robert Conley – "Paper Thin"	Thelma Plum – "Breathe in Breathe Out" & Jasmine Nelson – "Keep Her Close" (tie)	—N/a
2014	Husky Gawenda – "Saint Joan"	Meg Mac – "Roll Up Your Sleeves"	David Le'aupepe (Gang of Youths) – "Poison Drum"	Andy Bull – "Baby I Am Nobody Now" (Encouragement Award)
2015	No competition			
2016	Gretta Ray – "Drive"	Emma Louise – "Underflow"	Tigertown (Charlene Collins/Christopher Collins) "Lonely Cities" & Tia P. "4 Seats from Beyoncé" (tie)	—N/a
2018	Amy Shark "Adore"	David Le'aupepe (Gang of Youths) – "Let Me Down Easy"	David Le'aupepe (Gang of Youths) – "The Heart Is a Muscle"	Grace Shaw – "Better"
2019	Matt Corby and Dann Hume – "Miracle Love"	Sarah Aarons – "The Middle"	Sahara Beck – "Here We Go Again"	Kaiit – "Miss Shiney"
2020	Thelma Plum – "Better in Blak"	Baker Boy, (aka Danzal Baker) "Meditjin"	Ruel – "Painkiller"	Carla Geneve – "The Right Reasons"
2021	Genesis Owusu – "Gold Chains"	Jerome Farah – "Mikey Might"	MAY-A – "Time I Love to Waste"	
2022	King Stingray – "Milkumana"	Budjerah – "Ready for the Sky"	King Stingray - "Camp Dog"	Charley - "Worst Taste in Girls" (Claire Howell, Anthony Egizii and David Musumeci)
2023	No competition			
2024	Shannon Busch (pka WILSN) – "Give You Love" (performed by Jessica Mauboy and Jason Derulo)	Louis Schoorl – "12 Minute Walk" (performed by Bow Anderson)	Cam Nacson - "Forever Thing"	Charley - "Timebomb" (Claire Howell, Anton Engdahl and Kristin Carpenter)
2025	Ruel – "The Suburbs"	Ninajirachi – "iPod Touch"	Louis Schoorl- "Zombie" (performed by Lewis Fitzgerald)	Jude York - "Almost Me, Almost You"
