= Ruelle =

Ruelle is a surname of French origin. It may refer to:

== People ==
- David Ruelle, Belgian-French mathematical physicist
- Ruelle (singer), American singer-songwriter

== Places ==
- Ruelle-sur-Touvre, commune in the Charente department in southwestern France

== Mathematics ==
- Ruelle operator
- Ruelle zeta function
- Ruelle-Perron-Frobenius theorem

== See also ==
- Ruel (disambiguation)
