= Golden Years (M-Phazes and Ruel song) =

2017 single by M-Phazes and Ruel

Single by M-Phazes and Ruel^{[a]}
- Released: 14 April 2017
- Genre: Pop
- Length: 3:28 (original); 3:54 (remix)
- Label: M-Phazes Prod. RCA · SME (remix)
- Songwriters: Ruel Vincent van Dijk; Mark Landon; Peter Harding
- Producer: M-Phazes

M-Phazes singles chronology
"Messiah" (2016)	"Golden Years" (2017)	"Don't Even Know Me" (2017)

Ruel singles chronology
"Golden Years" (2017)	"Don't Tell Me" (2017)

Audio video
- "Golden Years" on YouTube

Music video
- "Golden Years" (M-Phazes remix) on YouTube

Remix cover

"Golden Years" is a song recorded by music producer M-Phazes and Australian singer Ruel. The song was released on 14 April 2017, becoming Ruel's official debut single. A remix of the song (which only credits Ruel as the lead artist) by M-Phazes was later released on 16 March 2018.

Ruel performed the song during the 2018 Commonwealth Games opening ceremony.

== Music video ==
Though a music video for the original track was never released, one was made for the song's remix by M-Phazes, which was released on 16 March 2018—the same day as the track's release.

== Reception ==
Sosefina Fuamoli from The AU Review said "the final result is something of polished and refined electronic-driven pop" and the song is "primed for radio success".

Elton John, during his Beats 1 radio show, complimented the song, saying "it’s astonishing [how] someone [Ruel] so young can write something so good" and jokingly said "I give up."

== Credits and personnel ==
Credits for the song's remix adapted from Tidal.

- Ruel Vincent van Djik – lead artist, songwriter
- Mark Landon – producer, songwriter
- Peter Harding – songwriter
- Chris Gehringer – mastering engineer
- Andrei Eremin – mixing engineer
- Phil Anquetil – recording engineer

== Formats and track listings ==
- Digital download
1. "Golden Years" – 3:28
- Digital download – M-Phazes remix^{[a]}
1. "Golden Years" (M-Phazes remix) – 3:54

== Notes ==
a.^{1} ^{2} The remix does not credit M-Phazes as a lead artist.
