= Ruel =

Ruel is a surname of French origin. Notable people with the surname include:

- Antoine Ruel (born 1979), French professional Magic: The Gathering player
- Claude Ruel (1938–2015), Canadian ice hockey coach
- Jean Ruel (1474–1537), French physician and botanist
- Muddy Ruel (1896–1963), American professional baseball player, coach, and general manager
- Olivier Ruel (born 1981), French professional Magic: The Gathering player
- Pat Ruel (born 1950), American football coach
- Paul Durand-Ruel (1831–1922), French dealer in Impressionist art
- Pierre de Ruel, marquis de Beurnonville (1752–1821), French Revolutionary Wars general
- Ruel (singer) (born 2002), Australian singer-songwriter

== See also ==
- Ruelle (disambiguation)
