= Growing Up Is =

2021 single by Ruel

"Growing Up Is _____"

Single by Ruel

from the album 4th Wall
- Released: 10 December 2021
- Length: 3:53
- Label: RCA; SME
- Songwriters: Ruel Vincent Van Djik; Julian Bunetta; Mark Landon; Aiden Rodriguez
- Producers: Julian Bunetta; M-Phazes

Ruel singles chronology
"Notice Me" (2021)	"Growing Up Is _____" (2021)	"Let the Grass Grow" (2022)

Live video
- "Growing Up Is _____" on YouTube

"Growing Up Is _____" is a song by Australian singer-songwriter Ruel. The song was released on 10 December 2021 as the lead single from his debut studio album, 4th Wall (2023). The song peaked at number 68 on the ARIA Singles Chart.

== Background and release ==
The song was described in a press release as being an "ode to the messy, complicated, yet ultimately exhilarating rites of passage we all traverse while growing up", with Ruel saying "The idea of the underline at the end of the title was to try to explain that everyone has a different experience growing up. Everyone has ups and downs, but because it's never just one thing, I couldn't just give it one word and wanted to leave it open for interpretation."

At the 2022 ARIA Music Awards, the song earned Ruel a nomination for Best Solo Artist.

At the APRA Music Awards of 2023, the song was nominated for Most Performed Australian Work of the Year and Most Performed Pop Work of the Year.

== Music video ==
An official live video, directed by Grey Ghost, produced by Jessica Galea and filmed at Filmworx in Melbourne was premiered on 9 December 2021.

== Critical reception ==
Al Newstead from ABC said "The track has the old-school soul of the 19-year-old's golden voice but the production is dreamier, with echoing drums and shimmering guitars providing a melancholy fringe. It all builds to an enrapturing chorus that captures the dizzying experience of youth: falling in and out of love and emotional yo-yo'ing between profound reflection and partying:"

== Charts ==
Chart performance for "Growing Up Is"
Chart (2021–2022)	Peak position
Australia (ARIA)	68
Czech Republic Airplay (ČNS IFPI)	21
New Zealand Hot Singles (RMNZ)	11

== Certifications ==
Certifications for "Growing Up Is"
Region	Certification	Certified units/sales
Australia (ARIA)	Gold	35,000^{‡}
^{‡} Sales+streaming figures based on certification alone.
