= Face to Face (Ruel song) =

2019 single by Ruel

Single by Ruel

from the EP Free Time
- Released: 8 August 2019
- Genre: Pop
- Length: 3:23
- Label: RCA; Sony Music Entertainment
- Songwriters: Ruel Vincent Van Djik; , Mayra Figueredo Mark Landon; Joseph Angel
- Producer: M-Phazes

Ruel singles chronology
"Flames" (2019)	"Face to Face" (2019)	"Real Thing" (2019)

Music video
- "Face to Face" on YouTube

"Face to Face" is a song by Australian singer-songwriter Ruel. The song was released on 8 August 2019, and was produced by M-Phazes. It is the second single from his second EP, Free Time.

== Music video ==
The music video was released on 8 August 2019—the same day as the song's release—and was directed by Grey Ghost. The video shows Ruel following a fictional French singer, ECÂF, breaking into her venue and eventually being kicked out. At the end of the music video, during her performance, ECÂF's song "Pictures" was featured.

== Reception ==
Michael Love Michael from Paper noted that the song has "a retro soul feel," and that it "tells a very modern tale of crushing on someone through a screen...capturing the anxieties in teen and millennial hearts alike".

Bella DiGrazia from The Daily Item stated that Ruel's "high and low range is hauntingly enticing" and that the saxophone solo towards the end of the song won her over.

Perez Hilton praises him and his song, saying that Ruel "continues to impress us with not just the quality of his work but also the variety".

== Credits and personnel ==
Credits adapted from Tidal.

- Ruel Vincent van Djik – lead artist, songwriting
- Mark Landon – producer, songwriting
- Joseph Angel – songwriting
- Jake Greene - songwriting
- Ian Peres – bass
- Sylvain Richard – drums
- Dan Walsh – guitar
- Cy Leo – harmonica
- Amy Ahn – harp
- Damian Smith – keyboards
- Matt Colton – mastering engineer
- Tele Fresco – miscellaneous producer
- Eric J. Dubowsky – mixing engineer
- DoXa – programmer
- Ted Case – strings

== Charts ==
Chart (2019)	Peak position
Australia (ARIA)	73
New Zealand Hot Singles (RMNZ)	8

== Certifications ==
Region	Certification	Certified units/sales
Australia (ARIA)	Gold	35,000^{‡}
New Zealand (RMNZ)	Gold	15,000^{‡}
^{‡} Sales+streaming figures based on certification alone.
