= I Can Die Now (song) =

Single by Ruel

from the album Kicking My Feet
- Released: 17 July 2025
- Genre: Pop
- Length: 2:51
- Label: Recess; Giant
- Songwriters: Ruel Vincent Van Dijk; Julian Bunetta; Mark Schick; Jacob Kasher Hindlin; Joshua Coleman; Ed Drewett
- Producers: Julian Bunetta; Mark Schick; Ammo

Ruel singles chronology
"Melodramatic Fanatic" (2025)	"I Can Die Now" (2025)	"The Suburbs" (2025)

Music video
- "I Can Die Now" on YouTube

"I Can Die Now" is a song recorded by Australian singer-songwriter, Ruel. It was released on 17 July 2025 through Recess Records and Giant Music, as the lead single from his second studio album, Kicking My Feet.

At the APRA Music Awards of 2026, the song was nominated for Most Performed Pop Work.

== Background and release ==
"I Can Die Now" was written by Ruel, Julian Bunetta, Mark Schick, Joshua Coleman, Jacob Kasher Hindlin, and Ed Drewett. The track was co-produced by Bunetta, Schick and Coleman (under his stage name Ammo). Ruel performed the song live during his Red Bull Symphonic concert in Sydney, in May 2025, two months before the song official release. During an interview with Rolling Stone Australia, Ruel shared his thoughts on the single for the first time:

"I've been waiting for what seems like forever to get I Can Die Now out. I love the juxtaposition between the title and the theme and energy of the song - once you listen to it, you’ll know what I mean. On top of that, ICDN is the first taste of what my new album might be like”

— Ruel speaking on the single, for Rolling Stone Australia

== Music video ==
An official music video, directed by Sweetiepie was released on 21 July 2025. Meanwhile, a second music video for the ER Version was released on 30 July 2025, and was directed, shot and edited by Joel Chamaa.

== Reception ==
"I Can Die Now" was met with positive reviews from music critics. Aedan Juvet of Stardust Magazine dubbed the song as an "infectious pop anthem", describing it as "a confident, camp-tinged anthem that doesn’t take itself too seriously—and that’s exactly why it works." Juvet stated that for the singer "love might feel like life or death, but pop should still be fun. And this track proves he knows how to make it feel that way." Emmy Mack of Music Feeds commented that the track "channels the ecstatic chaos of new love into a punchy three-minute anthem that’s equal parts cheeky and cathartic."

== Track listing ==
- Digital download and streaming
1. "I Can Die Now" – 2:51
- Digital download and streaming - ER Version
1. "I Can Die Now" (ER version) – 2:48
2. "I Can Die Now" – 2:51

== Personnel ==
=== Song ===
Credits adapted from Apple Music.

- Ruel Vincent Van Dijk – vocals, background vocals, songwriter
- Julian Bunetta – producer, songwriter, drums, guitar, keyboards, bass, percussion
- Joshua Coleman (a.k.a. Ammo) – producer, songwriter, drums, guitar
- Mark Schick – producer, songwriter, drums
- Jacob Kasher Hindlin – songwriter
- Ed Drewett – songwriter,
- Alex Ghenea – mixing engineer
- Harrison Tate – assistant mastering engineer
- Nathan Dantzler – mastering engineer

=== ER Version ===
- Beau Golden – producer, keyboards, bass
- Sophie Giuliani – guitar
- Madden Klass – drums, percussion
- Liam Quinn – mix, mastering engineer
- Eric Milos – engineering

=== Music video ===
Credits adapted from YouTube.

- Sweetiepie – director
- Neema Sadeghi – co-director (as sweetiepie), director of photography
- Ethan Frank – co-director (as sweetiepie), editor
- Typeface – production company
- Aiden Magarian – executive producer
- Mikey Nicholas – producer
- Sho Schrock-Manabe – producer
- Ethan Smith – 1st AC
- Garet Jatsek – steadicam
- Nathan Kadota – key grip
- Luis Cardenas – grip
- Sebastien Nuta – gaffer
- Michael Proa – electric
- Andrew Caso – production designer
- Daniel Richmond – leadman
- Alan Krohn – production assistant
- Emma Latcham-Reiter – production assistant
- Jermaine Daley – stylist
- Jinnah Park – tailor
- Kay Cunningham – HMU
- Dominique Da Silva – Girlfriend
- Adrianne D. Embry – Doctor #1
- Carlos Marcia Moreira – Doctor #2
- Tso – Dobermans
- Dylan Hageman – color
- Zeke Faust – VFX

== Charts ==
Chart performance for "I Can Die Now"
Chart (2025)	Peak position
New Zealand Hot Singles (RMNZ)	29

== Release history ==
"I Can Die Now" release history
Region	Date	Format(s)	Label	Version	Ref.
Various	17 July 2025	Digital download; streaming	Recess Records; Virgin Music Group; Giant Music	Original	
Various	30 July 2025	Digital download; streaming	Recess Records; Virgin Music Group; Giant Music	ER version	
