= Painkiller (Ruel song) =

Single by Ruel

from the EP Free Time
- Released: 1 May 2019
- Genre: Pop
- Length: 3:33
- Label: RCA/Sony Music Australia
- Songwriter(s): Ruel; Sarah Aarons; Hiren Mor
- Producer(s): M-Phazes

Ruel singles chronology
"Say" (2019)	"Painkiller" (2019)	"Flames" (2019)

Music video
- "Painkiller" on YouTube

"Painkiller" is a song recorded by Australian singer-songwriter Ruel. The song was released on 1 May 2019 as the lead single from his second extended play, Free Time. The song sees Ruel reunite with producer M-Phazes and Sarah Aarons (whom he had both collaborated with on his 2017 EP Ready), and collaborate with songwriter Hiren Mor for the first time.

In May 2020, a remix featuring American rapper Denzel Curry was released, alongside the announcement of a forthcoming remix EP. The Painkiller remix EP was released on 12 June 2020.

The song placed third at the 2020 Vanda & Young Global Songwriting Competition.

== Music video ==
The music video for "Painkiller" was released on 1 May 2019.

== Critical reception ==
Sose Fuamoli from Triple J said the song is "marked by bold bass and melodic work", saying "'Painkiller' is a track that sees Ruel step into a more mature songwriting space, leaning more into rich R&B notes and letting his natural cadence and rhythmic notes flourish. His soul and jazz influences bleed through on this single too, finding and connecting with that bass groove with ease."

Alissa Arunarsirakul from Ones to Watch said "'Painkiller' is drenched with warm violins, groovy bass lines, and luscious vocals".

== Track listing ==
Digital download
No.	Title	Length
1.	"Painkiller"	3:33

Digital download — Remix
No.	Title	Length
1.	"Painkiller" (featuring Denzel Curry)	3:47

Remix EP
No.	Title	Length
1.	"Painkiller" (featuring Denzel Curry)	3:47
2.	"Painkiller (Mr. Carmack Remix)" (featuring Denzel Curry)	3:30
3.	"Painkiller (Taka Perry Remix)"	3:23
4.	"Painkiller (Young Franco Remix)" (featuring Denzel Curry)	4:22
Total length:		15:02

RSD2021 Limited Edition 7" Transparent Yellow Vinyl (150 copies)
No.	Title	Length
1.	"Painkiller"	3:33
2.	"Painkiller (Instrumental Version)"	3:33

== Charts ==
=== Weekly charts ===
Chart (2019–2020)	Peak position
Australia (ARIA)	35
Australian Artist Singles (ARIA)	5
South Korea (Gaon)	52

=== Year-end charts ===
Chart (2019)	Position
Australian Artist (ARIA)	16
Chart (2020)	Position
Australian Artist (ARIA)	33
Chart (2021)	Position
South Korea (Gaon)	185

== Certifications ==
Region	Certification	Certified units/sales
Australia (ARIA)	3× Platinum	210,000^{‡}
New Zealand (RMNZ)	Platinum	30,000^{‡}
United States (RIAA)	Gold	500,000^{‡}
^{‡} Sales+streaming figures based on certification alone.

== Release history ==
Country	Date	Format	Version	Label
Australia	1 May 2019	Digital download, streaming	Original	RCA, Sony Music Australia
Australia	27 May 2020	Digital download, streaming	Denzel Curry remix	RCA, Sony Music Australia
Australia	April 2021	7" single	Sony Music Australia	Original & instrumental
