= Wild Guess (song) =

Single by Ruel

from the album Kicking My Feet
- Released: 26 September 2025
- Genre: Alternative pop
- Length: 2:46
- Label: Recess
- Songwriters: Ruel Van Dijk; Leroy Clampitt; Dan Wilson
- Producers: Leroy Clampitt; Dan Wilson

Ruel singles chronology
"The Suburbs" (2025)	"Wild Guess" (2025)	"Not What's Going On" (2025)

Music video
- "Wild Guess" on YouTube

"Wild Guess" is a song recorded by Australian singer-songwriter, Ruel. It was released on 26 September 2025 through Recess Records and Giant Music, as the third single from his second studio album, Kicking My Feet.

== Composition ==
The song was written by Ruel Van Dijk, Leroy Clampitt, and Dan Wilson, with the latter two serving as the song producers. On an interview with Sian Eleri for BBC Radio 1, Van Dijk shared his thoughts on the song:

"I think 'Wild Guess' is honestly my favourite of the singles. I think that one was super rewarding, because it was again that one came together really quickly. I just found it very satisfying to listen to this, because I feel like I hadn't written a song like that, like a reasonably up tempo song that felt like it had. I don't know, a bit more depth."

— Ruel on the song, via PM Studio World Wide

== Promotion ==
Van Dijk premiered the song on BBC Radio 1's Future Artists with Sian Eleri in late September, 2025. A saloon version was released on 14 November 2025 to further promote the track.

== Music video ==
A music video directed by Jackie! Zhou was released on 16 October 2025. The video depicts the production of a Western-themed film that experiences behind-the-scenes difficulties, as the co-stars, portrayed by Van Dijk and American actress and comedian Mary Beth Barone, are unable to get along.

"This video was SO FUN to make with Ruel. It was a dreamy process in which it felt like we were all playing and building on each others' ideas. [...] We were so lucky to get Mary Beth Barone as our Heroine opposite Ruel. She has an incredible dry humor and smart sensibility that led to silly ad libs and scenes throughout the video. I remember one of our crew members thinking she was actually upset with Ruel because she was so good at the feud in our narrative."

— Jackie! Zhou on directing the music video, via ABC Rage

About working with Van Dijk, Barone commented that "Ruel is a total professional and very kind so maybe the youth really will save us." An official behind-the-scenes video was released on 24 October 2025.

== Track listing ==
- Digital download and streaming
1. "Wild Guess" – 2:46
2. "I Can Die Now" – 2:51
3. "The Suburbs" – 3:08
- Digital download and streaming – Saloon Version
1. "Wild Guess" (Saloon Version) – 2:43
2. "Wild Guess" – 2:46

== Personnel ==
Credits adapted from Apple Music.

- Ruel Vincent Van Dijk – vocals, songwriter, acoustic guitar
- Leroy Clampitt – producer, songwriter, electric guitar, acoustic guitar, bass
- Dan Wilson – producer, songwriter, piano, electric guitar
- John Carroll Kirby – Rhodes piano
- Alex Ghenea – mixing engineer
- Nathan Dantzler – mastering engineer

Saloon version

- Ruel Vincent Van Dijk – vocals, songwriter
- Leroy Clampitt – songwriter
- Dan Wilson – songwriter
- Beau Golden – producer, keyboards, piano, bass
- Fer Fuentes – drums
- Liam Quinn – mixing engineer

== Release history ==
"Wild Guess" release history
Region	Date	Format(s)	Label	Version	Ref.
Various	26 September 2025	Digital download; streaming	Recess Records; Virgin Music Group; Giant Music	Original	
Various	14 November 2025	Digital download; streaming	Recess Records; Virgin Music Group; Giant Music	Saloon Version	
