= Real Thing (Ruel song) =

2019 single by Ruel

Single by Ruel

from the EP Free Time
- Released: 30 August 2019
- Genre: Pop; R&B
- Length: 3:12
- Label: RCA; SME
- Songwriters: Ruel Vincent Van Djik; Mark Landon; Alex Hope
- Producer: M-Phazes

Ruel singles chronology
"Face to Face" (2019)	"Real Thing" (2019)	"Down for You" (2020)

Music video
- "Real Thing" on YouTube

"Real Thing" is a song by English born Australian singer-songwriter Ruel. The song was released on 30 August 2019 as the third single from his second EP, Free Time.

== Music video ==
The music video for "Real Thing" was released on 12 September 2019. It stars Ruel as a robot who sees another robot get abused and sacrifices himself to save her.

== Critical reception ==
Tanis Smither from Earmilk says that Ruel seamlessly weaved R&B and pop together and the song "mounts into an impressive urgency".

== Credits and personnel ==
Credits adapted from Tidal.

- Ruel Vincent van Djik – lead artist, songwriting
- Alex Hope – songwriting, guitar
- Mark Landon – producer, songwriting
- Spencer Stewart – additional production
- Kito – additional production
- Sean Kantrowitz – guitar
- Daniel Walsh – guitar
- Nigel Rivers – Bass
- Jordan Rose – Drums
- Matt Curtin – assistant engineer
- Chris Athens – mastering engineer
- Eric J. Dubowsky – mixing engineer

== Charts ==
Chart (2019)	Peak position
Australia (ARIA)	73
New Zealand Hot Singles (RMNZ)	18

== Certifications ==
Region	Certification	Certified units/sales
Australia (ARIA)	Gold	35,000^{‡}
^{‡} Sales+streaming figures based on certification alone.

== Release history ==
Country	Date	Format	Label
Australia	30 August 2019	Digital download, streaming	RCA, Sony Music Australia
