= Bright Lights, Red Eyes =

EP by Ruel
- Released: 23 October 2020
- Length: 16:32
- Label: RCA; Sony
- Producer: M-Phazes

Ruel chronology
Free Time (2019)	Bright Lights, Red Eyes (2020)	4th Wall (2023)

Singles from Bright Lights, Red Eyes
- 1. "As Long as You Care" Released: 11 September 2020; 2. "Say It Over" Released: 2 October 2020; 3. "Distance" Released: January 2021

Bright Lights, Red Eyes is the third extended play (EP) by Australian singer-songwriter Ruel. The EP was released on 23 October 2020 through RCA Records.

The EP was written in June 2019 in a Airbnb mansion in Paris, France. Ruel said: "You can actually see it in the cover art – it's me and Sarah Aarons outside it" adding "We wrote five songs in about three days, each in under an hour."

In a press release in October 2020, Ruel said: "I want to get across that this project is another step forward in maturity for me. This project was a stream of consciousness when I was writing it at the time, and I feel like that's the way all projects and songs are for me. They are moments in time. This project isn't who I am right now as I wrote these songs last year, but it's the most mature you've ever heard me and it was me, in that moment in time."

== Reception ==
In the week of its released, the EP was Tone Deaf's record of the week. Geordie Gray called it "a delightful collection of fluttery, perfectly-crafted pop tracks. The neo-soul Cautious Clay collaboration 'Say it Over' is a real highlight", while Alexander Pan said: "Bright Lights, Bright Eyes is easily Ruel's most mature collection of songs to date. With his pop sound more polished and those vocals more emotional as ever, Ruel's new EP shows just why he's one of the most promising artists today."

== Track listing ==
No.	Title	Writer(s)	Producer(s)	Length
1.	"As Long as You Care"	Mark Landon; Ruel Vincent van Dijk; Sarah Aarons	M-Phazes	3:13
2.	"Distance"	Landon; van Dijk; Aarons	M-Phazes; Rory Nobel	2:59
3.	"Courage"	Landon; van Dijk; Aarons	M-Phazes	3:29
4.	"Say It Over" (featuring Cautious Clay)	Landon; van Dijk; Aarons; Joshua Karpeh	M-Phazes; Stuart Spencer	3:52
5.	"Up to Something"	Landon; van Dijk; Aarons; Simon Hessmann; Beau Golden	M-Phazes; Simon Hessmann	2:59
Total length:				16:32

== Charts ==
Chart (2020)	Peak position
New Zealand Albums (RMNZ)	40
