= Don't Tell Me (Ruel song) =

Single by Ruel

from the album Ready
- Released: 13 July 2017
- Length: 4:01
- Label: RCA Records/Sony Music Australia
- Songwriters: Peter Harding; Mark London; Ruel Vincent van Dijk
- Producer: M-Phazes

Ruel singles chronology
"Golden Years" (2017)	"Don't Tell Me" (2017)	"Human" (2017)

Music video
- "Don't Tell Me" on YouTube

"Don't Tell Me" is the debut solo single recorded by Australian singer Ruel and produced by M-Phazes. The song was released in July 2017 and peaked at number 86 on the ARIA Chart in August 2017. The song is a musical declaration of his self-assurance, which he wrote about committing sins and not even being Christian, as well as dating and falling in love at age 12 after his sisters mocked him and his parents said he was too young to fall in love.

In September 2017, Elton John played the song on BBC Radio 1, saying: "From Australia, this is a 14 year old boy ... with an amazing track. It's astonishing someone so young can write something so good. I give up." After the song faded, John added; "Amazing record. Wow. All I can say about that is, we'll be playing more of him, I hope."

The music video was released on 19 April 2018.

== Background ==
Ruel wrote the song when he was 12 years old and was inspired by an evening spent sitting at the dinner table telling his parents and siblings about a girl he had a crush on. Ruel explained “My whole family was like, ‘Ruel, you don't know what you're talking about, you're way too young to think about that sort of stuff,‘ and that really frustrated me. I thought ‘they can't tell me how to feel’, so I wrote a song about it. I never thought it would lead to all of this.” The then 12 year old high school dropout later took matters into his own hands and argued in that song that love is NOT a choice.

== Reception ==
Mike Wass from Idolator said "[the] emotional vocal commands your attention from the opening line and he displays the songwriting maturity of a veteran." adding it "reeks of quality." Nastassia Baroni from Music Feeds said "With defiant lyrics and uplifting M-Phazes-led production, the tender and soulful "Don’t Tell Me" makes clear Ruel is forging a path ahead for himself."

auspOp said ""Don't Tell Me" oozes class. It’s overflowing with soul and seriously, it's one of the songs of 2017." later adding "[it's] staggeringly good; beautifully vocalled, impassioned and laced with nuances that are way beyond Ruel’s tender years. It’s astonishing to contemplate that, if he’s this good at just 14, where’s he going to be in five or ten years from now?" Nic Kelly from Project U called Ruel "the boy with the absurdly brilliant voice" and said the song "has the piano work of a Meg Mac song and the structure of Rag'n'Bone Man on a good day." calling it "Amazing."

== Track listing ==
One-track single

1. "Don't Tell Me" - 4:01

Digital remixes

1. "Don't Tell Me" - 4:01
2. "Don't Tell Me" (acoustic) - 4:01
3. "Don't Tell Me" (Jarami remix) - 3:08
4. "Don't Tell Me" (Jerry Folk remix) - 3:28
5. "Don't Tell Me" (IAMNOBODI remix) - 4:01

== Charts ==
Chart (2018)	Peak position
Australia (ARIA)	86

== Certifications ==
Region	Certification	Certified units/sales
Australia (ARIA)	Platinum	70,000^{‡}
^{‡} Sales+streaming figures based on certification alone.

== Release history ==
Country	Date	Format	Version	Label	Catalogue
Australia	14 July 2017	Digital download, streaming	Original	RCA Records, Sony Music Australia	
United States	1 December 2017	Digital download, streaming	original	RCA Records	
Australia	19 April 2018	Digital download, streaming	Remixes	RCA Records, Sony Music Australia	
