= 4th Wall (album) =

Studio album by Ruel
- Released: 3 March 2023
- Length: 44:40
- Labels: RCA; Sony
- Producers: M-Phazes; Julian Bunetta; Sammy White; TMS

Ruel chronology
Bright Lights, Red Eyes (2020)	4th Wall (2023)	Adaptations (2024)

Ruel studio album chronology
4th Wall (2023)	Kicking My Feet (2025)

Singles from 4th Wall
- 1. "Growing Up Is" Released: 10 December 2021; 2. "Let the Grass Grow" Released: 11 March 2022; 3. "You Against Yourself" Released: 18 August 2022; 4. "Someone Else's Problem" Released: 28 October 2022; 5. "Must Be Nice" Released: 25 January 2023; 6. "I Don't Wanna Be Like You" Released: 28 February 2023

4th Wall is the debut studio album by Australian singer-songwriter Ruel, released on 3 March 2023. The album was announced on 25 January 2023.

Inspired by Ruel's favourite films, primarily The Truman Show and Fight Club, the album "imagines Ruel finding out his entire life is a lie, being filmed for someone else's entertainment". At the 2023 ARIA Music Awards, the album was nominated for Best Produced Release.

== Background and promotion ==
Upon announcement, Ruel said, "I spent the last 3 years writing it and wound up with over 100 songs. I rewrote half of them and re-recorded most of them, until they sounded exactly as I heard them in my head. It's been the biggest journey making this record and I know I kept you waiting for it, but on March 3rd, it'll be all yours. I'm so proud of it, thank you so, so much for sticking with me."

Ruel announced the first leg of his 4th Wall World Tour, which commenced in Australia and New Zealand in April 2023.

== Reception ==
Professional ratings
Review scores
Source	Rating
Clash	7/10
Milky Milky Milky	4/5 stars

Milky Milky Milky said "On his debut offering, Ruel comes to the realisation that life isn't all it appears to be. There's a complexity to the human existence, one that is heightened during the transitionary period towards adulthood. And that, in all its essence, is what forms the conceptual basis of 4th Wall... Overall, 4th Wall is a finely crafted capsule of stories that indicate the trajectory Australian pop music is heading. Subtly threading in nostalgic and multi-genre notes across the body of work speaks to how we consume music, influenced by different genres. The record takes influences that are so relatable, and adds junctures that either hark back to, or become, annotations within the album. Ruel has delivered a multi-faceted body of work that cements his place as one of Australia's most engaging contemporary acts."

Robin Murray from Clash Magazine said "Taken as a whole, 4th Wall is ruthlessly entertaining and undeniably ambitious, with Ruel chopping down the excess to leave only prime cuts. A punchy introductory gambit, the album finds the Australian pop trailblazer hauling down the walls while letting fans into his world."

== Track listing ==
4th Wall track listing
No.	Title	Writer(s)	Producer(s)	Length
1.	"Go On Without Me"	Ruel Vincent Van Dijk; Mark Landon; Scott Harris	M-Phazes; Rory Noble^{[a]}	2:42
2.	"I Don't Wanna Be Like You"	Van Dijk; Gabe Simon; Landon; Mikky Ekko; Spencer Stewart	M-Phazes; Simon	2:43
3.	"Sitting in Traffic"	Van Dijk; Jared Scharff; Landon; Maureen "Mozella" McDonald	M-Phazes	4:15
4.	"Japanese Whiskey"	Van Dijk; Peter James Harding	M-Phazes; Stewart^{[c]}	3:28
5.	"Growing Up Is"	Van Dijk; Julian Bunetta; Landon; Aidan Rodriguez	M-Phazes; Bunetta	3:53
6.	"Set Yourself on Fire"	Van Dijk; Ekko; Landon	M-Phazes	2:51
7.	"Lie"	Van Dijk; Landon; Jake Torrey; Fred Ball	M-Phazes; Torrey^{[a]}	2:54
8.	"Let the Grass Grow"	Van Dijk; Harding	M-Phazes^{[p]}	2:55
9.	"You Against Yourself"	Van Dijk; Emma Rosen; Sammy Witte	M-Phazes^{[p]}; Witte	2:26
10.	"Someone Else's Problem"	Van Dijk; Casey Smith; Jon Levine; Landon	M-Phazes	2:40
11.	"Wish I Had You"	Van Dijk; Rodriguez; Torrey; Landon; Tobias Jesso Jr.	M-Phazes; 18yoman^{[c]}; Len20^{[c]}	3:16
12.	"If and/or When"	Van Dijk; Rosen; Ethan Gruska; Landon; Rahel Phillips	M-Phazes; Gruska	2:52
13.	"Must Be Nice"	Van Dijk; Sean Douglas; Landon; Thomas Barnes; Peter Kelleher; Benjamin Kohn	M-Phazes; TMS	2:55
14.	"End Scene"	Van Dijk; Harding; Landon	M-Phazes	4:50
Total length:				44:40

Notes

- ^{^[p]} signifies a primary and vocal producer
- ^{^[c]} signifies a co-producer
- ^{^[a]} signifies an additional producer

== Personnel ==
Musicians

- Ruel – vocals (all tracks), guitar (track 9)
- Spencer Stewart – bass guitar (1, 2, 4), guitar (2, 4); background vocals, drum machine, piano (4)
- Jake Reed – drums (1)
- Daniel Walsh – guitar (1, 2, 6, 10)
- Beau Golden – piano (1, 3, 6, 11), synthesizer (1, 12), keyboards (7, 12)
- Jan Bangma – bass guitar (2, 10, 12)
- Gabe Simon – guitar (2); background vocals, bass guitar, percussion (6)
- Pearl Lion – bass guitar, guitar (3)
- M-Phazes – background vocals (4), drum machine (4, 8), synthesizer (8), vocals (10)
- Aidan Rodriguez – background vocals (4), acoustic guitar (5, 8), electric guitar (5), keyboards (8, 11), synthesizer (14)
- Dora Jar – background vocals (4)
- Julian Bunetta – bass guitar, electric guitar (5)
- Colin Munroe – background vocals (7, 8)
- Blake Straus – bass guitar (7)
- Hillary Smith – cello (7)
- Jake Torrey – guitar (7)
- Emiko Bankson – strings (7)
- Ted Case – strings (7)
- Sofia Kim – viola (7)
- Carrie Kennedy – violin (7)
- Michelle Shin – violin (7)
- Sean Hurley – bass guitar (8)
- Sammy Witte – bass guitar, drum machine, guitar, keyboards, programming (9)
- Joseph E-Shine Mizrachi – guitar (10)
- Scott Dittrich – guitar (10)
- Ben Johnson – vocals (10)
- Casey Smith – vocals (10)
- Rahel Phillips – background vocals (12)
- Ethan Gruska – guitar (12)
- Tom Barnes – bass guitar (13)
- Ben Kohn – organ (13)
- Peter Kelleher – synthesizer (13)
- PJ Harding – guitar (14)
- Ian Peres – synthesizer (14)

Technical

- Ruairi O'Flaherty – mastering (1–4, 6, 7, 11–14)
- Dale Becker – mastering (5, 8–10)
- Lars Stalfors – mixing (1–4, 6, 7, 11–14)
- Eric J Dubowsky – mixing (5, 8–10)
- Sammy Witte – engineering (9)
- M-Phazes – vocal engineering (9)
- Connor Hedge – engineering assistance (9)
- Matt Curtin – engineering assistance (9)

== Charts ==
=== Weekly charts ===
Weekly chart performance for 4th Wall
Chart (2023)	Peak position
Australian Albums (ARIA)	3
New Zealand Albums (RMNZ)	10

=== Year-end charts ===
2023 year-end chart performance for 4th Wall
Chart (2023)	Position
Australian Artist Albums (ARIA)	20

== Release history ==
Release dates and formats for 4th Wall
Region	Date	Format(s)	Label	Ref.
Various	3 March 2023	CD; digital download; streaming	RCA; Sony	
