= Ammo (music producer) =

American record producer and songwriter

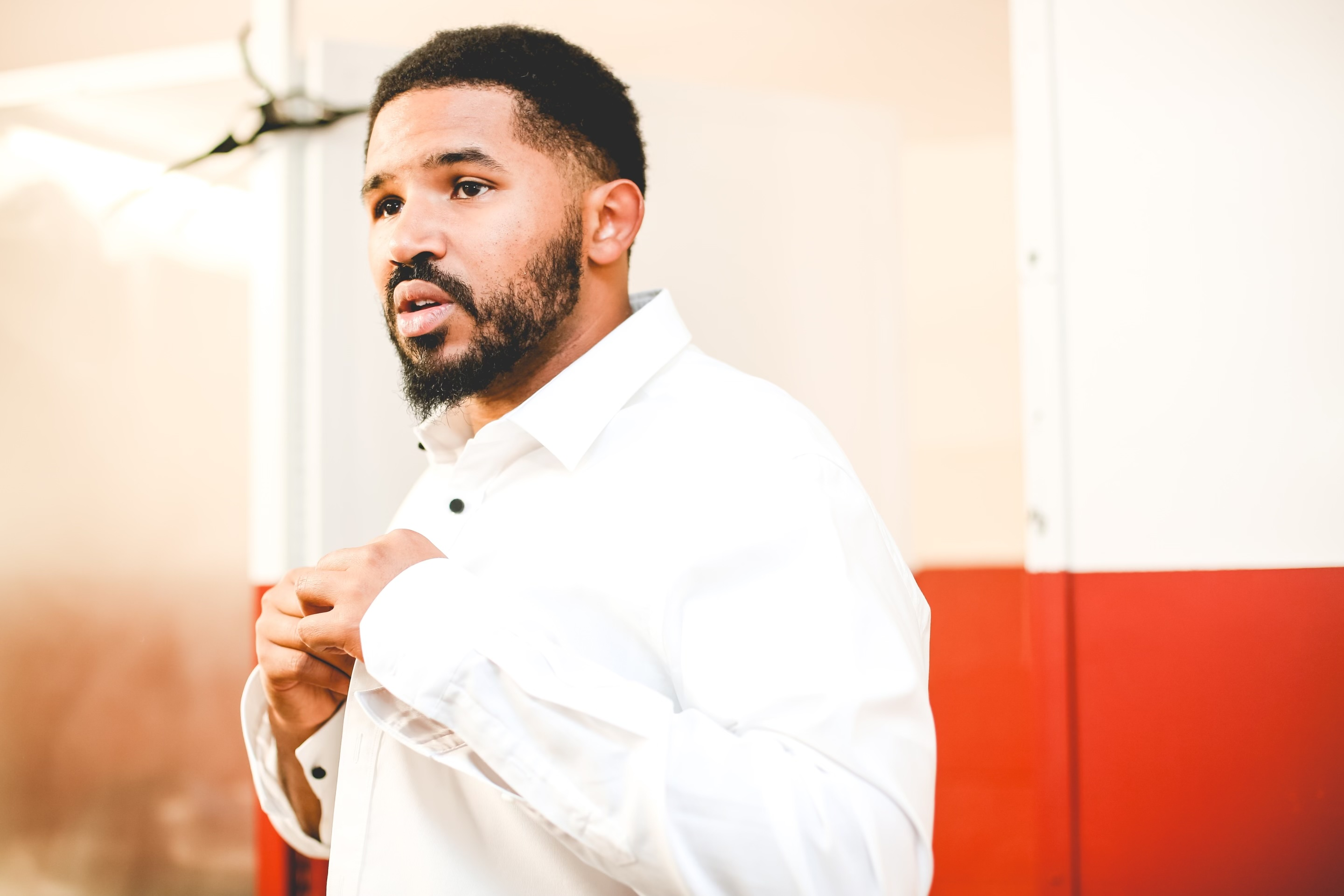
- Coleman in 2014
- Born: Joshua Emanuel Coleman
- Occupations: Record producer; songwriter
- Spouse: Jude Demorest (m. 2016)
- Children: 4
- Musical career
- Origin: Baltimore, Maryland
- Genres: Pop; R&B; pop rock

Joshua Emanuel Coleman, known by his stage name Ammo, is an American record producer and songwriter. He has co-written and produced songs for Alex Warren, Beyoncé, Kesha, Katy Perry, Pitbull, Maroon 5, Britney Spears, Jessie J, Jason Derulo, Mike Posner, Fifth Harmony, R. Kelly, Flo Rida, and Selena Gomez. Ammo has contributed to hits including Maroon 5's "Sugar", Kesha's "Your Love Is My Drug", Katy Perry's "E.T.", and Fifth Harmony's "Work from Home". He started working with Dr. Luke in 2009, after signing with Dr. Luke's production company, Prescription Songs.

== Selected discography ==
Year	Artist	Album	Track	Songwriter	Producer
2009	Jordin Sparks	Battlefield	"Watch You Go"	check	check
2009	Pitbull	Rebelution	"Girls"	check	check
2009	Kesha	Animal	"Your Love Is My Drug"	check	check
2009	Kesha	Animal	"Blind"	check	check
2009	Kesha	Animal	"Hungover"		check
2010	Miranda Cosgrove	Sparks Fly	"Kissin U"	check	check
2010	Miranda Cosgrove	Sparks Fly	"There Will Be Tears"	check	check
2010	Jesse McCartney	Have It All	"Shake"	check	check
2010	Jesse McCartney	Have It All	"Mrs. Mistake"	check	check
2010	Kesha	Cannibal	"Cannibal"	check	check
2010	Kesha	Cannibal	"We R Who We R"	check	check
2011	Britney Spears	Femme Fatale	"(Drop Dead) Beautiful"	check	check
2011	Katy Perry	Teenage Dream	"E.T."	check	check
2012	Adam Lambert	Trespassing	"Better Than I Know Myself"	check	check
2012	Leona Lewis	Glassheart	"Lovebird"	check	check
2013	Jessie J	Alive	"Wild"	check	check
2013	Jessie J	Alive	"Sexy Lady"	check	check
2013	Becky G	Play It Again	"Play It Again"	check	check
2013	Britney Spears	Music from and Inspired by The Smurfs 2	"Ooh La La"	check	check
2013	Selena Gomez	Stars Dance	"I Like It That Way"	check	check
2013	Mike Posner	Pages	"The Way It Used to Be"	check	check
2014	Sean Paul	Full Frequency	"Turn It Up"	check	
2014	Jason Derulo	Talk Dirty	"The Other Side"	check	check
2014	Timeflies	After Hours	"All We Got is Time"	check	check
2014	Push Baby (Rixton)	Let the Road	"We All Want The Same Thing"	check	
2014	Beyoncé	Beyoncé	"Pretty Hurts"	check	check
2014	Jessie J	Sweet Talker	"Strip"	check	check
2015	Maroon 5	V	"Sugar"	check	check
2015	R. Kelly	The Buffet	"Let's Be Real Now ft. Tinashe"	check	check
2015	Flo Rida	My House (EP)	"Once in a Lifetime"	check	check
2015	Dillon Francis	Money Sucks, Friends Rule	"Love in the Middle of a Firefight"	check	check
2015	Rixton	Me & My Broken Heart (EP)	"We All Want the Same Thing"	check	
2016	Fifth Harmony	7/27	"Work from Home"	check	check
2017	Fifth Harmony	Fifth Harmony	"Down"	check	check
2017	Fifth Harmony	Fifth Harmony	"He Like That"	check	check
2017	Halsey	Hopeless Fountain Kingdom	"Hopeless"	check	
2018	Lil Dicky & Chris Brown	TBA	"Freaky Friday"	check	
2018	Chromeo	Head Over Heels	"Bedroom Calling pt. 1"	check	check
2020	Akon	Ain't No Peace	"Ain't No Peace"	check	check
2022	Lauv	All 4 Nothing	"Stranger"	check	
2023	Teddy Swims	I've Tried Everything but Therapy (Part 1)	"Some Things I'll Never Know"	check	
2023	Teddy Swims	I've Tried Everything but Therapy (Part 1)	"Lose Control"	check	check
2023	Teddy Swims	I've Tried Everything but Therapy (Part 1)	"The Door"	check	check
2023	Teddy Swims	I've Tried Everything but Therapy (Part 1)	"Suitcase"	check	
2024	Thomas Rhett	About a Woman	"Beautiful as You"	check	check
2025	Teddy Swims	I've Tried Everything but Therapy (Part 2)	"Not Your Man"	check	check
2025	Teddy Swims	I've Tried Everything but Therapy (Part 2)	"Northern Lights"	check	
2025	Alessia Cara	Love & Hyperbole	"Nighttime Thing"	check	check
2025	Mark Ambor	TBA	"Who Knows"		check
2025	Alex Warren and Rosé	You'll Be Alright, Kid	"On My Mind"		check
2025	Ruel	Kicking My Feet	"I Can Die Now"	check	check
2025	Ava Max	Don't Click Play	"Know Somebody"	check	check
2025	Elevation Worship	So Be It	"God I'm Just Grateful"	check	check
