= The Way It Used to Be (Mike Posner song) =

Promotional single by Mike Posner
- Released: June 11, 2013
- Recorded: 2012
- Genre: Pop
- Length: 4:06
- Label: RCA
- Songwriters: Mike Posner; Martin Johnson; Joshua Coleman
- Producers: Martin Johnson; Ammo; Kyle Moorman

"The Way It Used to Be" is a song by Mike Posner. The song was released as promotional single in the United States on June 11, 2013 as a digital download. The song peaked at number 73 on the Australian Singles Chart.

== Music video ==
A music video to accompany the release of "The Way It Used to Be" was first released onto YouTube on August 15, 2013 at a total length of four minutes and three seconds. It depicts Posner vying for the affection of an ex lover.

== Reception ==
Rose Lilah, writing for Hot New Hip Hop, called it a "fine addition" to Posner's body of work.

== Track listing ==
Digital download
No.	Title	Length
1.	"The Way It Used to Be"	4:06

== Chart performance ==
Chart (2013)	Peak position
Australia (ARIA)	73
U.S. Pop Digital Songs (Billboard)	35

== Release history ==
Region	Date	Format	Label
United States	June 11, 2013	Digital download	RCA Records
United States	July 9, 2013	Mainstream airplay	RCA Records
