= Free Time (EP) =

EP by Ruel
- Released: 13 September 2019
- Length: 25:12
- Label: RCA; Sony
- Producer: M-Phazes

Ruel chronology
| Ready (2018) | Free Time (2019) | Bright Lights, Red Eyes (2020) |

Singles from Free Time
- 1. "Painkiller" Released: 30 April 2019; 2. "Face to Face" Released: 8 August 2019; 3. "Real Thing" Released: 30 August 2019

Free Time is the second extended play (EP) by Australian singer-songwriter Ruel. The EP was announced in July 2019 and was released on 13 September 2019 through RCA Records. "Painkiller" was released as the lead single on 30 April 2019.

== Reception ==
Professional ratings
Review scores
| Source | Rating |
|---|---|
| auspOp | 4/5 stars |

David from auspOp said the EP has "There is something both modern and instantly classic about all the songs included here and as people tend to listen to playlists more and more than albums or EPs, this one draws you in from start to finish" adding "The musical maturity is here and that comes through on the lyrics as much as the arrangements.".

Debbie Carr from ABC called the EP "sophisticated" saying "Ruel is riding a rollercoaster that's only going up."

Broadway World said "The new body of work is the next step in the evolution of Ruel as an artist, demonstrating his deep maturity as a writer, able to seamlessly move through genres and pen relatable lyrics."

== Track listing ==
Credits adapted from Tidal.

| No. | Title | Writer(s) | Producer(s) | Length |
|---|---|---|---|---|
| 1. | "Don't Cry" | Mark Landon; Ruel Vincent van Dijk; Sarah Aarons | M-Phazes; DoXa^{[b]} | 3:07 |
| 2. | "Real Thing" | Alex Hope; Landon; van Dijk | M-Phazes; DoXa^{[b]}; Kito^{[b]} | 3:12 |
| 3. | "Painkiller" | Landon; van Dijk; Aarons | M-Phazes; Tele Fresco^{[a]} | 3:33 |
| 4. | "Hard Sometimes" | Landon; van Dijk; Stephen Wrabel | M-Phazes; Wrabel^{[b]} | 4:29 |
| 5. | "Face to Face" | Joseph Angel; Landon; van Dijk | M-Phazes; Tele Fresco^{[b]} | 3:23 |
| 6. | "Unsaid" | Landon; Peter Harding; van Dijk; Spencer Stewart; Tobias Jesso Jr. | M-Phazes; DoXa^{[a]} | 3:47 |
| 7. | "Free Time" | Landon; Nick Long; van Dijk; Stewart | M-Phazes; DoXa^{[b]} | 3:38 |
| Total length: | | | | 25:12 |

Notes

- ^{^[a]} signifies a co-producer.
- ^{^[b]} ⁣⁣signifies a miscellaneous producer.
- "Don't Cry" features background vocals from Sarah Aarons.
- "Painkiller" features background vocals from Sarah Aarons.
- "Hard Sometimes" features background vocals from Wrabel.
- "Face to Face" features background vocals from Thief.
- "Unsaid" features background vocals from Siobhan O'Rourke, Thief and Tobias Jesso Jr.
- "Free Time" features background vocals from Camille Grigsby, Cassandra Grigsby-Chimm, Jason McGee and Quishima Dixon.

== Charts ==
=== Weekly charts ===
| Chart (2019) | Peak position |
|---|---|
| Australian Albums (ARIA) | 3 |
| New Zealand Albums (RMNZ) | 18 |
| UK download Albums (OCC) | 74 |

=== Year-end charts ===
| Chart (2019) | Position |
|---|---|
| Australian Artist Albums (ARIA) | 36 |
| Chart (2020) | Position |
| Australian Artist Albums (ARIA) | 40 |

== Certifications ==
| Region | Certification | Certified units/sales |
|---|---|---|
| South Korea (KMCA) | 3× Platinum | 7,500,000^{*} |
| New Zealand (RMNZ) | Gold | 7,500^{‡} |
^{*} Sales figures based on certification alone.^{‡} Sales+streaming figures based on certification alone.

== Release history ==
| Region | Date | Format(s) | Label | Catalogue |
|---|---|---|---|---|
| Australia | 13 September 2019 | Digital download, streaming, CD | RCA, Sony Music | 19075989982 |
