= Giant Music =

American record label

- Founded: 2022
- Founder: Irving Azoff
- Genre: Various
- Country of origin: U.S.
- Location: Los Angeles, California
- Official website: www.giantmusic.com

Giant Music is an American independent record label founded in 2022, by American businessman and record executive, Irving Azoff. The label, serves as a rebranded reboot of Azoff's former venture, Giant Records, a subsidiary of Warner Records he originally founded and managed from 1990 until Warner ended the joint venture with the label in 2001. Ironically, Warner Music Sweden would revive and appropriate the branding of "Giant Records" as a single's label in 2015, without Azoff's involvement.

Giant Music operates under the Azoff Company, to provide industry standard resources, such as marketing and distribution to established and upcoming artists who wish to remain independent, to retain ownership to their music and achieve their goals in the contemporary music business.

The label's debut was the single, "JUGG" by Atlanta rapper, Swavay released Jun 8, 2022 jointly by Giant, Def Jam and Universal Music Group.

In 2026, Giant Music entered a partnership with American digital music distributor Stem, following the platform's acquisition by Nashville-based entertainment firm and parent company, Concord in 2025. Under the agreement, Concord provides long-term financial backing and investment in Giant to increase their roster and artist development overtime, while allowing the label to remain an independent entity and expand their distributive network internationally through Stem's global infrastructure.

== Roster ==
Current: Big Wild; Cash Cobain; Blair Davie; Deb Never; Empress Of; FendiDa Rappa; Hohnen Ford; Kid Sistr; Kids That Fly; Isabella Lovestory; K.Flay; Mike Will Made It; Riff Wood; Mitch Rowland; Ruel; Sierra Spirit	Former: Becca Means; Matilda Lyn; New West; Stephen Sanchez; Swavay; Tay B; That Chick Angel; Ayleen Valentine
