= Ruel (singer) =

British-Australian singer-songwriter

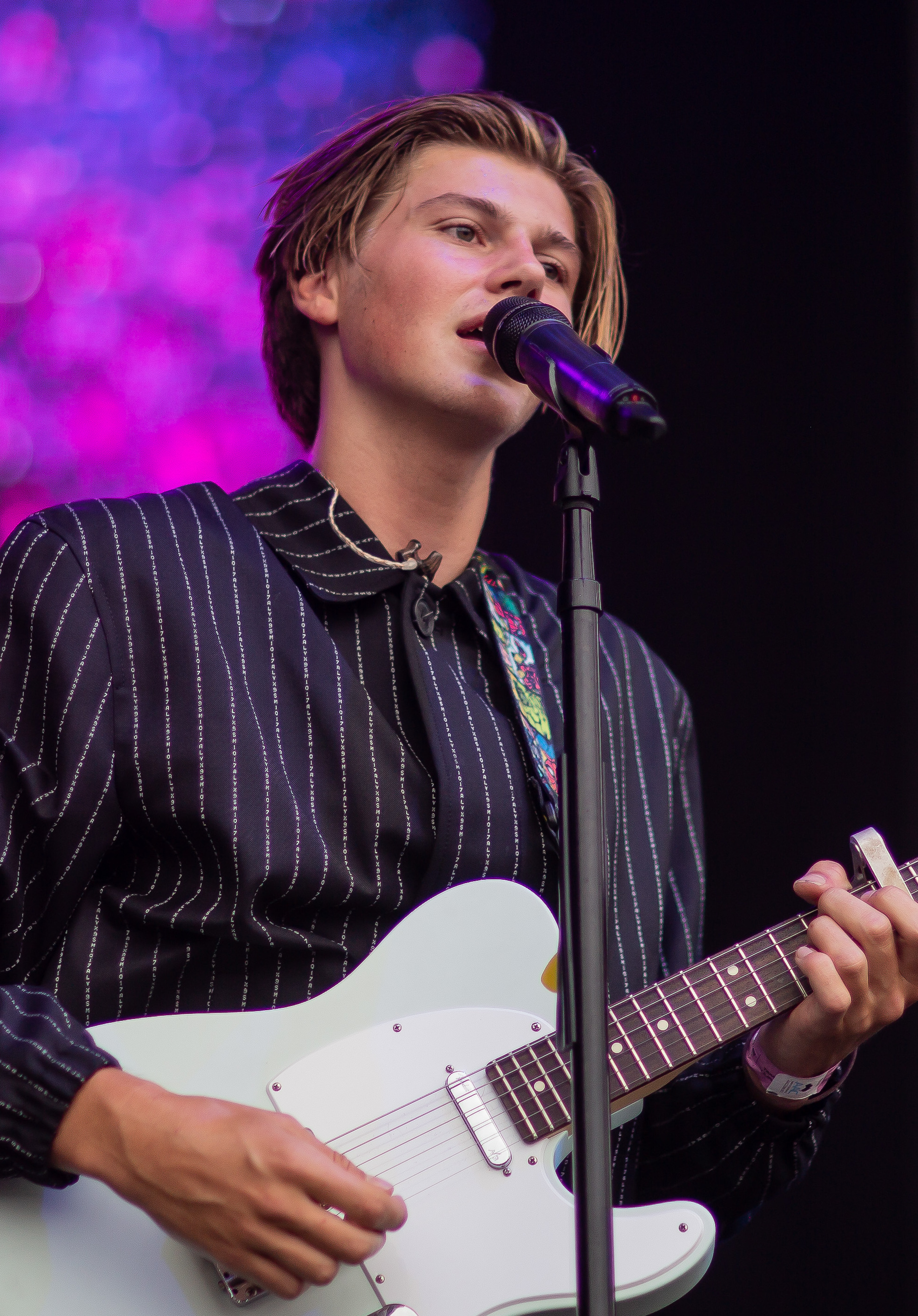
- Ruel performing at Laneway Festival in 2020

Background information
- Born: Ruel Vincent van Dijk; 29 October 2002 (age 24); Isleworth, London, England
- Origin: Sydney, New South Wales, Australia
- Genres: Pop; R&B; soul
- Occupations: Singer; songwriter
- Instruments: Vocals; guitar; piano
- Years active: 2017–present
- Labels: The Muziek Trust; RCA; Sony Music Australia (2017-2023); Giant Music (2024-)
- Website: oneruel.com

Ruel Vincent van Dijk (born 29 October 2002), known mononymously as Ruel, is an Australian singer and songwriter from Sydney, best known for his singles "Don't Tell Me", "Younger", "As Long as You Care" and "Painkiller". At the ARIA Music Awards of 2018, he won the award for Breakthrough Artist for his single "Dazed & Confused". Ruel's debut studio album 4th Wall was released on 3 March 2023.

== Early life ==
Ruel was born on 29 October 2002, in Isleworth, London, to English mother, Kate Vincent, and Dutch-born and New Zealand-raised father, Ralph van Dijk. His father is the founder of Australian radio advertising agency, Eardrum. His family moved to Sydney, Australia in 2006.

== Music career ==
=== 2015–2017: early years ===
In 2015, Ruel's father sent a demo of him singing James Bay's "Let It Go" to Grammy Award-winning producer M-Phazes.

In April 2017, Ruel released his debut single "Golden Years" with M-Phazes. In June, Ruel made his live radio debut performing Jack Garratt's "Weathered" on Triple J's Like a Version. At 14, he was the youngest-ever featured performer on the segment. The video gathered half a million video views in less than 48 hours.

In July 2017, Ruel released "Don't Tell Me", which peaked at number 86 on the ARIA Singles Chart. Later in September, Elton John played "Don't Tell Me" on BBC Radio 1, giving Ruel high praise. The track was also featured in CelebMix's 21 songs by under-21s in 2018.

In November, Ruel joined Khalid on his American Teen Tour of Australia and New Zealand. Later that month, Ruel signed with RCA Records internationally. In December, Tom Thum released a cover of Rag'n'Bone Man's "Human" featuring Ruel on vocals.

=== 2018–2020: Ready and Free Time EPs ===
On 24 March 2018, Ruel played at Pop Spring Festival, Tokyo, where he did his first meet and greet. On 4 April, Ruel performed at the Opening Ceremony of the 2018 Commonwealth Games. On 19 April, a music video for the single "Don't Tell Me" was released.

On 2 June, Ruel announced the release of his debut extended play Ready on 15 June, as well as a headline tour in June and July. In October, Ruel performed to a sell-out crowd in Sydney, and received the news that his single "Younger" had recently been certified gold by ARIA. On 11 October, Ruel was nominated for the Breakthrough Artist award for the ARIA Awards, which he later won, making him the youngest ever to do so.

On 10 January 2019, Ruel confirmed that he would appear on Hilltop Hoods' new album The Great Expanse, on the track "Fire & Grace". The album was then released on 22 February. On 1 May, he released the lead single from his Free Time EP, "Painkiller", alongside an accompanying music video. On 9 August, Ruel released the single "Face to Face" alongside a music video that was shot whilst on tour in France. On 13 September, Ruel released his second EP, Free Time. In November 2019, Ruel was an opening act for two shows of Shawn Mendes' self-titled tour.

On 31 January 2020, Ruel collaborated with Cosmo's Midnight on the track "Down for You". The song's music video premiered on 18 March 2020.

=== 2020: Bright Lights, Red Eyes ===
On 4 September 2020, Ruel posted a video on Instagram with the caption "alayc", hinting at new music. On 10 September 2020, the single "As Long as You Care" was premiered on Triple J, before releasing later that day, alongside an accompanying music video. Ruel additionally announced his third EP, Bright Lights, Red Eyes, which was released on 23 October 2020.

=== 2021–2023: 4th Wall ===
Ruel's debut studio album 4th Wall was released on 3 March 2023. The album peaked at number 3 on the ARIA Charts.

=== 2024: DMA's Collaboration and Adaptations ===
On 18 April 2024, Ruel released two songs with Australian band DMA's. The collaboration's second single, "We're a Pair Of Diamonds", first saw the light of day in October 2023 at a sold-out Enmore Theatre. As a surprise for fans, he joined DMA's onstage for a stripped-down, acoustic performance of the unreleased alt-pop ballad. Originally written during sessions for his debut album, 4th Wall, the song was revived thanks to the enthusiastic response from the crowd and online community. This outpouring of support inspired both Ruel and DMA's to bring the song to life.

In June 2024, Ruel released a cover of Sixpence None the Richer's "Kiss Me"; the lead single from his fourth EP, Adaptations, and first on new label Giant Records.

=== 2025: Kicking My Feet and Kicking My Feet & Screaming ===
On 22 August 2025, Ruel announced his second studio album, Kicking My Feet, which was released on 17 October 2025. A sequel, titled Kicking My Feet & Screaming, was released on 12 June 2026.

== Discography ==
=== Studio albums ===
- 4th Wall (2023)
- Kicking My Feet (2025)
- Kicking My Feet & Screaming (2026)

== Awards and nominations ==
=== APRA Awards ===
The APRA Awards are held in Australia and New Zealand by the Australasian Performing Right Association to recognise songwriting skills, sales and airplay performance by its members annually. Ruel has been nominated for three awards.

Year	Nominee / work	Award	Result	Ref.
2020	Himself	Breakthrough Songwriter of the Year	Nominated	
2023	"Growing Up Is_____" (Ruel Van Dijk / Mark Landon / Julian Bunetta)	Most Performed Australian Work	Nominated	
2023	"Growing Up Is_____" (Ruel Van Dijk / Mark Landon / Julian Bunetta)	Most Performed Pop Work	Nominated	
2026	"I Can Die Now" (Ruel Van Dijk / Julian Bunetta / Joshua Coleman / Edward Drewett / Jacob Kasher Hindlin / Steven Schick)	Most Performed Pop Work	Nominated	

=== ARIA Music Awards ===
The ARIA Music Awards is an annual awards ceremony that recognises excellence, innovation, and achievement across all genres of Australian music. Ruel has won one award from the five nominations.

Year	Nominee / work	Award	Result	Ref.
2018	"Dazed & Confused"	Breakthrough Artist – Release	Won	
2020	Free Time	Best Male Artist	Nominated	
2020	"Painkiller"	Song of the Year	Nominated	
2020	M-Phazes for Free Time	Producer of the Year	Nominated	
2020	Eric J Dubowsky for Free Time	Engineer of the Year	Nominated	
2022	"Growing Up Is ____"	Best Solo Artist	Nominated	
2023	M-Phazes for 4th Wall	Best Produced Release	Nominated	

=== Nickelodeon Kids' Choice Awards ===
The Nickelodeon Kids' Choice Awards is an annual U.S. children's awards ceremony show that is produced by Nickelodeon.

Year	Nominee / work	Award	Result	Ref.
2019	Himself	Favourite Aussie/Kiwi Music Maker	Won	

=== MTV Europe Music Awards ===
The MTV Europe Music Awards is an award presented by Viacom International Media Networks to honour artists and music in pop culture.

Year	Nominee / work	Award	Result	Ref.
2019	Himself	Best Australian Act	Won	

=== National Live Music Awards ===
The National Live Music Awards (NLMAs) are a broad recognition of Australia's diverse live industry, celebrating the success of the Australian live scene. The awards commenced in 2016.

Year	Nominee / work	Award	Result	Ref.
2019	Himself	Live Voice of the Year	Won	

=== Rolling Stone Australia Awards ===
The Rolling Stone Australia Awards are awarded annually in January or February by the Australian edition of Rolling Stone magazine for outstanding contributions to popular culture in the previous year.

Year	Nominee / work	Award	Result	Ref.
2023	"Growing Up Is _____"	Best Single	Nominated	

=== Vanda & Young Global Songwriting Competition ===
The Vanda & Young Global Songwriting Competition is an annual competition that "acknowledges great songwriting whilst supporting and raising money for Nordoff-Robbins" and is coordinated by Albert Music and APRA AMCOS. It commenced in 2009.

Year	Nominee / work	Award	Result	Ref.
2020	"Painkiller"	Vanda & Young Global Songwriting Competition	3rd	
2025	"The Suburbs"	Vanda & Young Global Songwriting Competition	1st	

== Concert tours ==
=== Headlining ===
- Dazed & Confused (2018)
- Ready EP Launch Tour (2018)
- Ready Tour Asia (2019)
- Painkiller Tour (2019)
- Free Time World Tour (2019)
- Growing Up Is _____ Tour (2022)
- 4th Wall Tour (2023)
  - Support: Telenova
- Kicking My Feet Tour (2026)
- Kicking & Screaming Tour UK + EU (2026)
  - Support - Sadie Jean

=== Supporting ===
- Gallant - Ology Tour (2017)
- Khalid - American Teen Tour (2017-2018)
- Mabel - These are the Best Times Tour (2018)
- Shawn Mendes – Shawn Mendes: The Tour (2019)
