= M-Phazes =

- Born: Mark Landon; 1 February 1983 (age 43); Gold Coast, Queensland, Australia
- Genres: Hip-hop; R&B
- Occupation: Record producer
- Instruments: Sampler; keyboards; bass guitar
- Years active: 2007–present
- Labels: It's Official; Warner; Obese
- Website: mphazes.com

Mark Landon (born 1 February 1983), better known by his stage name M-Phazes, is an Australian-born producer based in Los Angeles. He has produced records for Logic, Demi Lovato, Madonna, Eminem, Kehlani, Zara Larsson, Remi Wolf, Kiiara, Noah Cyrus, and Cautious Clay. He produced and wrote Eminem's 2015 song "Bad Guy", as well as "Sober" by Demi Lovato and "playinwitme" by KYLE.

Landon discovered and led singer Ruel to sign with RCA Records. M-Phazes produced Amy Shark’s songs including "Love Songs Ain't for Us", co-written by Ed Sheeran. In 2017, Landon was nominated for Producer of the Year at the APRA Awards alongside Flume. In 2018 he won 5 ARIA Awards including Producer of the Year.

== Early life ==
M-Phazes was born on 1 February 1983. He went to Miami High School on the Gold Coast and lived in Burleigh Heads, Queensland.

== Career ==
=== 2008: One Stop Shop ===
In 2008, Mark Landon was the winner of Sha Money XL's 'One Stop Shop' beat battle in Phoenix, Arizona. The competition was judged by producers such as Swizz Beats (Jay Z, Alicia Keys), DJ Premier (Nas, Christina Aguilera) and Denaun Porter (Eminem, D12). His win at One Stop would lead to producing for Contemporary R&B superstar Amerie.

=== 2009: Flying Colors and Running On Air ===
M-Phazes reached gold sales for the first time in 2009 with Bliss n Eso's album Flying Colours, of which he produced seven songs, and reached his first platinum sales in 2010 with Bliss n Eso's album Running On Air.

=== 2010: Signing to Mushroom Music/Obese Records and Good Gracious ===
In 2010, M-Phazes signed a publishing deal with Mushroom Records and record deal with Obese Records, later releasing his debut album Good Gracious featuring Bliss n Eso, Drapht, Illy, Phrase and many other Australian hip hop artists. Good Gracious won an ARIA Award for Best Urban Release, beating Bliss n Eso's Running On Air of which he produced seven songs.

=== 2011: Kimbra's Vows ===
M-Phazes was enlisted by Kimbra in 2011 to co-produce her platinum debut album Vows. Vows won Best Pop Album and Album of the Year in the New Zealand Music Awards.

=== 2013: Universal Music Publishing and "Bad Guy" ===
2013 saw M-Phazes sign a worldwide deal with Universal Music Publishing Group and land his first major placement with "Bad Guy", which was the intro track on Eminem's eighth album The Marshall Mathers LP 2.

=== 2014: Illy's "Tightrope" and Cinematic ===
In 2014 M-Phazes produced his first platinum selling single with Illy's "Tightrope" taken from the gold-selling album Cinematic, which was executive produced by M-Phazes.

M-Phazes then worked with Keyshia Cole, 2 Chainz, Daniel Johns, Luke Steele, Kimbra, Illy, Guy Sebastian, Thelma Plum, Meg Mac and Hopium.

He also produced the 2014 song "Don't Wanna Fall in Love" by singer/rapper Kyle.

=== 2015: Grammy and APRA Awards ===
M-Phazes received a Grammy award for his co-production work on the track "Bad Guy" from Eminem's album The Marshall Mathers LP 2. The album received the 2015 Grammy award for Best Rap Album.

He also received the 2015 Urban Work of the Year APRA award for his co-production on the track "Tightrope" taken from Illy's album Cinematic.

== Awards and nominations ==
=== AIR Awards ===
The Australian Independent Record Awards (commonly known informally as AIR Awards) is an annual awards night to recognise, promote and celebrate the success of Australia's Independent Music sector.

| Year | Nominee / work | Award | Result |
|---|---|---|---|
| 2010 | Good Gracious | Best Independent Hip Hop/Urban Album | Nominated |

=== ARIA Music Awards ===
The ARIA Music Awards is an annual awards ceremony that recognises excellence, innovation, and achievement across all genres of Australian music. M-Phazes has won two awards from six nominations.

| Year | Nominee / work | Award | Result |
|---|---|---|---|
| 2010 | Good Gracious | Best Urban Album | Won |
| 2016 | "Papercuts" by Illy (featuring Vera Blue) | Producer of the Year | Nominated |
| 2016 | "Papercuts" by Illy (featuring Vera Blue) | Engineer of the Year | Nominated |
| 2018 | "I Said Hi" by Amy Shark (with Dann Hume) | Producer of the Year | Won |
| 2018 | "I Said Hi" by Amy Shark (with Dann Hume) | Engineer of the Year | Nominated |
| 2020 | Free Time by Ruel | Producer of the Year | Nominated |
| 2021 | Cry Forever by Amy Shark, The Space Between by Illy and T.R.U.T.H. by Guy Sebastian | Producer of the Year | Nominated |
| 2023 | M-Phazes for Ruel – 4th Wall | Best Produced Release | Nominated |

=== National Live Music Awards ===
The National Live Music Awards (NLMAs) are a broad recognition of Australia's diverse live industry, celebrating the success of the Australian live scene. The awards commenced in 2016.

| Year | Nominee / work | Award | Result |
|---|---|---|---|
| 2017 | himself | Live Instrumentalist of the Year | Nominated |

== Discography ==
=== Solo albums ===
List of albums, with selected details and chart positions
| Title | Album details | Peak chart positions |
| Title | Album details | AUS |
|---|---|---|
| Good Gracious | Released: February 2010; Label: Obese (OBR070); Format: CD, digital | 20 |
| Phaze One (with Emilio Rojas) | Released: 2011; Label: Obese (OBR078); Format: CD, digital | — |
| Phazed Out (Mixed by DJ Rhettmatic) | Released: February 2012; Label: Coalmine; Format: Digital | — |
| The Works | Released: 28 June 2013; Label: Obese (OBR 090); Format: CD, digital | — |
| Land of the Crooks (with Sean Price) | Released: December 2013; Label: Coalmine; Format: Digital | — |

=== Writing and production credits ===
| Year | Artist | Song title | Album | Label | Credit |
|---|---|---|---|---|---|
| 2026 | bbno$ | "Diamonds are Forever" | Single | broke | Producer, writer |
| 2024 | D.O. | "About Time" | Blossom | Company Soosoo | Producer, writer |
| 2024 | I-Land 2 | "Final Love Song" | Single | Stone Music Entertainment | Producer, writer |
| 2021 | K.Flay | "Dating My Dad" ft. Travis Barker | Inside Voices / Outside Voices | BMG | Producer, writer |
| 2021 | Claire Rosinkranz | "Frankenstein" | Single | Republic Records | Producer, writer |
| 2021 | Elliphant | "Juice Me" | Single | Hitco | Producer, writer |
| 2021 | Sinéad Harnett | "Distraction" "Hard 4 Me 2 Love You" | Ready Is Always Too Late | The Orchard | Producer, writer |
| 2021 | Zach Hood | "13 Missed Calls" | Single | Independent | Producer, writer |
| 2021 | Lexi Jayde | "Newbury Park" | Single | APG | Producer |
| 2021 | Yung Bae | "Disco Body Parts" ft. Awolnation | Single | Arista | Producer |
| 2021 | Ruel | "Too Many Feelings" | Single | RCA | Producer, writer |
| 2021 | Dixie D'Amelio | "Fuck Boy" | Single | Hitco | Producer, writer |
| 2021 | Dixie D'Amelio | "Roommates" | Single | Hitco | Producer, writer |
| 2021 | Amy Shark | "I'll Be Yours"; "The Wolves"; "Worst Day of My Life" | Cry Forever | RCA | Producer |
| 2021 | Amy Shark | "Love Songs Ain't For Us" ft. Keith Urban | Love Songs Ain't For Us EP | RCA | Producer |
| 2021 | Amy Shark | "All the Lies About Me" | Love Songs Ain't For Us EP | RCA | Producer |
| 2021 | Amy Shark | "C'MON" ft. Travis Barker | Love Songs Ain't For Us EP | RCA | Producer |
| 2020 | Carlie Hanson | "Side Effects" | DestroyDestroyDestroyDestroy | Warner | Producer, writer |
| 2020 | Jutes | "When You're Around" | A Really Bad Dream | Capitol | Producer, writer |
| 2020 | Kiiara | "Two Thumbs" | Lil Kiiwi | Atlantic Records | Producer, writer |
| 2020 | Ruel | "As Long As You Care"; "Distance"; "Courage"; "Say It Over"; "Up to Something" | Bright Lights, Red Eyes | RCA | Producer, writer |
| 2020 | Ruel | "Say It Over" ft. Cautious Clay | Single | RCA | Producer, writer |
| 2020 | Ruel | "Painkiller" ft. Denzel Curry | Single | RCA | Producer, writer |
| 2020 | Remi Wolf | "Disco Man" | I'm Allergic to Dogs! | Island | Producer, writer |
| 2020 | VanJess | "Come Over" | Single | RCA | Producer, writer |
| 2020 | Noah Cyrus | "I Got So High I Found Jesus"; "The End of Everything"; "Young & Sad" | The End of Everything | RECORDS/Columbia | Producer |
| 2020 | Anthony Russo | "Nobody to Love" | Single | Sewing Apples | Producer, writer |
| 2020 | Love Mansuy | "Count On You" ft. Lil Wayne | Single | Warner | Producer, writer |
| 2020 | Isaac Dunbar | "Boy" | Isaac's Insects | RCA | Producer, writer |
| 2020 | Bipolar Sunshine, Chloe Angelides | "Ex-Wifi" | Single | Spanakopita Lullabies | Producer, writer |
| 2019 | Jarryd James | "Let It Go" | Single | Dryden Street | Producer, writer |
| 2019 | Guy Sebastian | "Let Me Drink" ft. Wale | Single | Sony Australia | Producer, writer |
| 2019 | Guy Sebastian | "Choir" | Single | Sony Australia | Producer, writer |
| 2019 | Carlie Hanson | "Back In Your Arms" | Single | Warner | Producer, writer |
| 2019 | Carlie Hanson | "Cigarettes" | Junk | Warner | Producer, writer |
| 2019 | Kehlani | "Love Language" | While We Wait | Atlantic Records | Producer, writer |
| 2019 | KYLE | "F You I Love You" ft. Teyana Taylor | Light Of Mine | Atlantic Records | Producer, writer |
| 2019 | Ekali | "Back 2 You" ft. Kiiara | Single | OWSLA | Producer, writer |
| 2019 | Claudia Leitte | "Bandera" | Single | Roc Nation | Producer, writer |
| 2019 | Ruel | "Courage"; "Don't Cry"; "Unsaid"; "Hard Sometimes"; "Real Thing"; "Face To Face"; "Painkiller" | Free Time | RCA | Producer, writer |
| 2019 | East | "Brick by Brick" | Single | Warner Music Australia | Producer, writer |
| 2019 | Meg Mac | "Something Tell Us" | Single | 300 Entertainment | Producer, writer |
| 2018 | Demi Lovato | "Sober" | Single | Island / Hollywood / Safehouse | Producer, writer |
| 2018 | M-Phazes | "Bad Behavior" ft. Daniel Johns | Single | Sony Australia | Producer, writer |
| 2018 | MAX | "Still New York" ft. Joey Bada$$ | Single | Atlantic Records | Producer, writer |
| 2018 | Ruel | "Say"; "Thinkin Bout You"; "Younger" | Ready | RCA | Producer, writer |
| 2018 | Amy Shark | "I Said Hi" | Single | RCA | Producer, writer |
| 2018 | KYLE | "Moment" (ft. Wiz Khalifa); "Ups and Downs"; "Rodeo"; "Babies" (ft. Alessia Cara); "IMissMe" (ft. Khalid); "It's Yours"; "Playinwitme" (ft. Kehlani) | Light of Mine | Atlantic Records | Producer, writer |
| 2017 | KYLE | "All Mine" (ft. MadeinTYO) | Single | Atlantic Records | Producer, writer |
| 2017 | Mark Johns | "Same Girl" | Single | OWSLA | Producer, writer |
| 2017 | Jasmine Thompson | "Someone's Somebody" | Wonderland | Atlantic Records | Producer |
| 2017 | Zara Larsson | "What They Say" | So Good | Epic Records | Writer |
| 2017 | Ruel | "Don't Tell Me" | Single | RCA | Producer, writer |
| 2017 | M-Phazes & Ruel | "Golden Years" | Single | M-Phazes Productions Pty. Ltd. | Producer, writer |
| 2017 | Guy Sebastian | "High On Me"; "Mind On You" | Conscious | Sony Australia | Producer, writer |
| 2016 | Alison Wonderland | "Messiah" | Single | Universal Australia | Producer, writer |
| 2016 | Amy Shark | "Adore"; "Blood Brothers" | Night Thinker | Sony Australia | Producer, writer |
| 2016 | Illy | "Catch 22" (ft. Anne-Marie); "Papercuts" (ft. Vera Blue) | Two Degrees | Warner Australia | Producer, writer |
| 2016 | Alison Wonderland | "Messiah" | N/A | | Producer, writer |
| 2016 | Moxie | "On My Mind" (ft. Pusha T) | 931 Reloaded | Def Jam | Producer, writer |
| 2016 | KLP | "Ember" | Ember - EP | Universal Australia | Producer, writer |
| 2016 | Guy Sebastian | "Set In Stone" | (Single) | Guytunes Records | Producer, writer |
| 2015 | Madonna | "Veni Vidi Vici" | Rebel Heart | Interscope | Writer |
| 2015 | Lupe Fiasco | "Blur My Hands" (ft. Guy Sebastian) | Tetsuo & Youth | Atlantic | Producer, writer |
| 2015 | KYLE | "Don't Wanna Fall in Love"; "Really? Yeah!" | Smyle | Indie-Pop | Producer, writer |
| 2015 | Marracash | "Senza Un Posto Nel Mondo" (feat.Tiziano Ferro) | Status | | Producer, writer |
| 2015 | Guy Sebastian | "Light & Shade" (ft. Sage Da Gemini) | Madness | Sony Australia | Producer, writer |
| 2015 | Daniel Johns | "Imagination" | Talk | Eleven | Producer, writer |
| 2015 | Meg Mac | "Never Be" | (Single) | 300 Ent. | Producer, writer |
| 2015 | Hopium | "Right Now" | (Single) | Warner Music | Producer |
| 2014 | Thelma Plum | "Monsters"; "Young In Love"; "How Much Does Your Love Cost"; "Candle" | Monsters - EP | | Producer, writer |
| 2014 | Logic | "Bounce"; "Till The End" | Under Pressure | Def Jam | Producer, writer |
| 2014 | Keyshia Cole | "N.L.U." (ft. 2 Chainz) | Point Of No Return | Interscope | Producer, writer |
| 2014 | Meg Mac | "Grandma's Hands" | MEG MAC | 300 Ent. | Producer, writer |
| 2014 | Illy | "Tightrope" | Cinematic | ONETWO | Producer, writer |
| 2014 | Allday | "Wolves" (ft. Sunni Colon) | Startup Cult | Concord | Producer, writer |
| 2014 | Hopium | "Dreamers" | (Single) | | Producer, writer |
| 2014 | 360 | "Must Come Down" (ft. Pez) | Utopia | | Producer, writer |
| 2014 | Eminem | "Bad Guy" | MMLP2 | Aftermath | Producer, writer |
| 2012 | Kimbra | (multiple tracks) | Vows | Warner Bros. | Producer, writer |
| 2012 | Xzibit | "Stand Tall" (feat. Slim the Mobster) | Napalm | EMI | Producer, writer |
