= Taka Perry =

Australian-Japanese musician and producer

- Taka Perry in 2024

Background information
- Born: 18 October 1998 (age 28); Canberra, Australia
- Genres: R&B; Hip-hop; Pop; K-Pop
- Occupations: Music producer; songwriter
- Instruments: Guitar; Piano; Bass guitar; Vocals; Ableton Live
- Years active: 2016–present
- Website: takaperry.com

Taka Perry (born 18 October 1998) is an Australian-Japanese record producer, songwriter and artist from Canberra, Australia. His collaborations include Katseye, Ruel, Denzel Curry, Cashmere Cat, Hard Life, Blake Slatkin, and BE:FIRST. He co-produced and co-wrote "Touch" by Katseye, which charted on the Billboard Global 200. Forbes Japan included him in their annual 30 Under 30 list in 2026.

== Career ==
Taka Perry was born and raised in Canberra, Australia to an American father and Japanese mother. He played a variety of instruments from a young age, and on his 12th birthday his parents bought him a digital audio workstation which sparked his interest in production. He has cited Aphex Twin and Boards of Canada as early influences. While attending high school at Narrabundah College, he met Robert Conley through a school songwriting program run by APRA AMCOS. Upon graduating, he relocated to Sydney to pursue a career in music, with Conley acting as a mentor in his early career. He is fluent in both English and Japanese.

In 2018, he worked as a producer on Ruel's debut EP Ready, including ARIA multi-platinum certified single "Younger" and ARIA gold certified single "Not Thinkin' Bout You". In July 2019, Perry announced a record deal signing with etcetc.

In June 2020, Perry released an official remix for "Painkiller" by Ruel featuring Denzel Curry. In July 2020, he performed a cover of Kanye West's "Jesus Walks" for Triple J's Like a Version segment, featuring Western Sydney musician A.Girl. The performance was met with critical acclaim, with Rolling Stone Australia calling it "an anthem for the current times."

Whilst living in Australia, Perry began working remotely with Japanese music artists, which led to him start producing for prominent acts in the territory including JP THE WAVY, WILYWNKA, and SIRUP.

In July 2024, Katseye released the R&B and drum and bass song "Touch", which Perry co-produced and co-wrote alongside Cashmere Cat, Blake Slatkin, Omer Fedi, Caroline Ailin, and Kota Banks. The song charted in Canada, Singapore, Malaysia, South Korea, and the Philippines, as well as the Billboard Global 200 and US Bubbling Under Hot 100 chart. A remix of the same song was released in October 2024, featuring Yeonjun from TOMORROW X TOGETHER. In November 2024, J-Pop artist Aile The Shota released his album "REAL POP", which Perry produced and co-wrote 2 songs on. The album reached #5 on the Billboard Japan Download Albums chart.

In February 2025, MAZZEL released J-Pop song "J.O.K.E.R. ", which Perry produced and co-wrote alongside SKY-HI and Loar. The song charted on Billboard Japan Hot 100, reached #1 on Spotify Japan Viral 50, and as part of MAZZEL's EP "Royal Straight Flush", reached #2 on both Billboard Japan Top Albums Sales and Download Albums charts. In May 2025, AKTHESAVIOR and Leon Fanourakis released hip-hop song "Ichiban" featuring Denzel Curry and Yeek, which Perry produced.

In July 2025, English alternative indie pop group Hard Life released their third album "Onion", which Perry executive produced, producing and co-writing 13 out of 14 songs. The first single from the album, "Othello" debuted as Jack Saunders' "Hottest Record" on BBC Radio 1.

In February 2026, MAZZEL released J-Pop song "Banquet Bang", which Perry produced and co-wrote alongside SKY-HI and Loar. The song charted at #2 on both Billboard Japan Download Songs and Hot Shot Songs. The subsequent album, "Banquet", was released in April 2026, and charted at #1 on Billboard Japan Download Albums and #3 on Hot Albums. In July 2026, Aoen released J-Pop song "Hajimari Color", which Perry produced and co-wrote. The song reached #7 on Billboard Japan Hot 100. In August 2026, Forbes Japan included him in their annual 30 Under 30 list in 2026.

In September 2026, go!go!vanillas released Japanese rock song "Trick Star", which Perry produced. The song was used as the ending theme for Tokyo Revengers: War of the Three Titans Arc.

== Production discography ==
Year	Title	Artist	Album	Label	Production	Songwriting	Notes
2026	"Exercise"	BE:FIRST	BE:4U	Avex	check	check	
2026	"Peace" (featuring WILYWNKA)	SIRUP	Whereabouts?	Avex	check	check	
2026	"Is This Love?"	NOA	Clean+Noise	Universal Music Japan	check		
2026	"Trick Star"	go!go!vanillas	Trick Star	Irori Records	check		
2026	"Tired"	SIRUP	Non-album single	Avex	check	check	
2026	"Aiaiainante"	Ryugujo	Motto	Sony Japan	check	check	#3 Billboard Japan Top Albums Sales
2026	"Uh Oh"	Psychic Fever from Exile Tribe	Different	Warner Music Japan	check	check	#8 Billboard Japan Hot Albums #2 Top Albums Sales
2026	"Ongaku"	Aile The Shota	Non-album single	BMSG	check	check	
2026	"Hajimari Color"	Aoen	Hajimari Color	HYBE	check	check	#7 Billboard Japan Hot 100
2026	"Aftertaste" (featuring Rejay)	Rol3ert	Meet Me In My Head	Exciter Records	check	check	
2026	"Follow Me"	Yo-Sea	Sea of Love	AOTL	check	check	
2026	"Ate!"	GPP	Non-album single	Warner Music Japan	check	check	
2026	"GG"	Ayumu Imazu	Classic	BMSG	check	check	#9 Billboard Japan Top Albums Sales
2026	"Bounce Back"	Ayumu Imazu	Classic	BMSG	check	check	#9 Billboard Japan Top Albums Sales
2026	"For Me"	REIKO	Voice	BMSG	check	check	
2026	"Stay Gold"	Myname	RE:Blue	Irving	check	check	
2026	"Boy"	Rol3ert	Meet Me In My Head	Exciter Records	check	check	#5 Billboard Japan Heatseekers Songs
2026	"Romeo"	ShowMinorSavage	SIDE	BMSG	check	check	#9 Billboard Japan Download Songs
2026	"2am"	Riho Sayashi	OWN	Avex	check	check	
2026	"Psycho"	Ai Tomioka	愛が溶けないうちに	Victor Entertainment	check	check	
2026	"Enoshima Orange Blue"	Aile The Shota	REAL POP 2	Universal Music Japan	check	check	#9 Billboard Japan Download Albums
2026	"キセキセツ"	Aile The Shota	REAL POP 2	Universal Music Japan	check	check	#9 Billboard Japan Download Albums
2026	"Senaka Ni Ribbon"	Chara+YUKI	Senaka Ni Ribbon	Sony Japan	check		#5 Billboard Japan Top Singles Sales
2026	"Banquet Bang"	MAZZEL	Banquet	Universal Music Japan	check	check	#2 Billboard Japan Download Songs #3 Hot Shot Songs #1 Download Albums #1 Hot Albums
2026	"Higher"	Haruno	Non-album single	Victor Entertainment	check	check	
2025	"midnight"	yama	アダルトチックチルドレン	Sony Japan	check	check	
2025	"Maybe"	REIKO	Voice	BMSG	check	check	
2025	"Undercover" (featuring Ayumu Imazu)	SIRUP	Owari Diary	Avex	check	check	
2025	"Location"	SIRUP	Owari Diary	Avex	check	check	
2025	"Kira Kira"	SIRUP	Owari Diary	Avex	check	check	
2025	"Paradise"	SIRUP	Owari Diary	Avex	check	check	
2025	"Tomorrow"	SIRUP	Owari Diary	Avex	check	check	
2025	"OGRE"	Hard Life	Onion	Island Records	check	check	
2025	"y3llow bike"	Hard Life	Onion	Island Records	check	check	
2025	"crickets!!!"	Hard Life	Onion	Island Records	check	check	
2025	":(fever:("	Hard Life	Onion	Island Records	check	check	
2025	"proximityeffect"	Hard Life	Onion	Island Records	check	check	
2025	"Jane"	Hard Life	Onion	Island Records	check	check	
2025	"OCTOpus"	Hard Life	Onion	Island Records	check	check	
2025	"tele9raph hill"	Hard Life	Onion	Island Records	check	check	
2025	"P1L0T"	Hard Life	Onion	Island Records	check	check	
2025	"are you sti11 watching?"	Hard Life	Onion	Island Records	check	check	
2025	"p a n o r a m a"	Hard Life	Onion	Island Records	check	check	
2025	"Othello"	Hard Life	Onion	Island Records	check	check	
2025	"end credits"	Hard Life	Onion	Island Records	check	check	
2025	"Ichiban" (featuring Denzel Curry & Yeek)	AKTHESAVIOR & Leon Fanourakis	Non-album single	Dream Free Records	check	check	
2025	"Rendezvous" (featuring Hard Life)	SIRUP	Owari Diary	Avex	check	check	
2025	"Coffee Float" (featuring Hard Life)	Alexandros	Provoke	Universal Music Japan		check	#7 Billboard Japan Download Albums
2025	"New Style"	Ai Tomioka	愛が溶けないうちに	Victor Entertainment	check	check	
2025	"Monster"	Furui Riho	Letters	Pony Canyon	check	check	
2025	"Sakura"	Aile The Shota	REAL POP 2	BMSG	check	check	
2025	"Butterfly"	iri	Seek	Sony Japan	check	check	
2025	"レコード"	yama	; semicolon	Sony Japan	check	check	
2025	"J.O.K.E.R."	MAZZEL	Royal Straight Flush	BMSG	check	check	#3 Billboard Japan Download Songs
2024	"Tomorrow"	Furui Riho	Tomorrow	Pony Canyon	check	check	
2024	"Kodak" (featuring Toaka)	haruno	Fool	Victor Entertainment	check	check	
2024	"Eternity"	Aile The Shota	Real Pop	BMSG	check	check	#9 Billboard Japan Download Albums
2024	"Foolish"	Aile The Shota	Real Pop	BMSG	check	check	#9 Billboard Japan Download Albums
2024	"Game Over"	SIRUP	Owari Diary	Suppage Records	check	check	
2024	"Escape"	Leon Fanourakis & Taka Perry	The Griffin Tapes	Pretty Good Records	check	check	
2024	"Believe" (featuring Ramengvrl, Sokodomo, YNG Martyr)	Leon Fanourakis & Taka Perry	The Griffin Tapes	Pretty Good Records	check	check	
2024	"Fly"	Leon Fanourakis & Taka Perry	The Griffin Tapes	Pretty Good Records	check	check	
2024	"Quickluv" (featuring CJ Fly)	Leon Fanourakis & Taka Perry	The Griffin Tapes	Pretty Good Records	check	check	
2024	"Express"	Leon Fanourakis & Taka Perry	The Griffin Tapes	Pretty Good Records	check	check	
2024	"Power" (featuring SEEDA, ISSUGI)	Leon Fanourakis & Taka Perry	The Griffin Tapes	Pretty Good Records	check	check	
2024	"Imaninareba" (featuring 李大奔)	Leon Fanourakis & Taka Perry	The Griffin Tapes	Pretty Good Records	check	check	
2024	"Numb" (featuring PANIA)	Leon Fanourakis & Taka Perry	The Griffin Tapes	Pretty Good Records	check	check	
2024	"Angel"	Wooseok (from Pentagon)	Non-album single	UNDFND	check	check	
2024	"Want Me Back" (featuring Claudia)	Ramengvrl	TBA	Warner Music Asia	check	check	
2024	"Touch"	Katseye	SIS (Soft Is Strong)	HYBE	check	check	ARIA: Platinum; Pro-Música Brasil: Diamond; Music Canada: Platinum; SNEP: Gold; RMNZ: PLatinum; BPI: Silver
2024	"Tarmeka"	Allday	The Necklace	Dew Process	check		
2024	"Overtime"	haruno	Fool	Victor Entertainment	check	check	
2024	"You"	Wooseok (from Pentagon)	Non-album single	UNDFND	check	check	
2024	"Begin"	SANTAWORLDVIEW	Nice to Knee You	1% ONEPERCENT	check		
2024	"Cowboy's Life"	SANTAWORLDVIEW	Nice to Knee You	1% ONEPERCENT	check		
2024	"City to City" (featuring WILYWNKA)	SANTAWORLDVIEW	Nice to Knee You	1% ONEPERCENT	check		
2024	"Excuse Me"	WILYWNKA	90's Baby	1% ONEPERCENT	check		
2024	"Gorgeous" (featuring ¥ellow Bucks and Nephew)	WILYWNKA	90's Baby	1% ONEPERCENT	check		
2024	"What!?"	WILYWNKA	90's Baby	1% ONEPERCENT	check		
2024	"Dying Love"	WILYWNKA	90's Baby	1% ONEPERCENT	check		
2024	"Richman" (featuring VIGORMAN)	WILYWNKA	90's Baby	1% ONEPERCENT	check		
2024	"GO!!"	SIRUP	Non-album single	Suppage Records	check	check	
2023	"2MANYTIMES"	SIRUP and Cody Jon	Non-album single	Saint Lucky Records	check	check	
2023	"New World"	MFS	COMBO	Warner Music Japan	check	check	
2023	"Feel Alive"	Cat & Calmell	How Do You Feel?	EMI Music Australia	check	check	
2023	"Death Wobbles"	Cody Jon	Death Wobbles	Saint Lucky Records	check	check	
2023	"AKANE"	Rei(c)hi	Non-album single	Independent	check		
2023	"i loved a boy"	Thomas Headon	Six Songs That Thomas Headon Likes and Thinks That You Would Like Too	Elektra Records	check	check	
2023	"2009 TOYOTA"	Thomas Headon	Six Songs That Thomas Headon Likes and Thinks That You Would Like Too	Elektra Records	check	check	
2022	"Keep it Runnin" (featuring MFS)	WILYWNKA	Counter	1% ONEPERCENT	check		
2022	"Don't"	Taka Perry	Kakomirai	etcetc	check	check	
2022	"Alive"	Taka Perry	Kakomirai	etcetc	check	check	
2022	"Lemonade" (featuring Boy Soda)	Taka Perry	Kakomirai	etcetc	check	check	
2022	"Guillotine" (featuring Young Dirty Bastard)	Taka Perry	Kakomirai	etcetc	check	check	
2022	"北齋"	Taka Perry	Kakomirai	etcetc	check	check	
2022	"Apollo" (featuring MUNGMUNG, Cyprus, goyo, rako, DALI HART)	Taka Perry	Kakomirai	etcetc	check	check	
2022	"Tokyo"	Taka Perry	Kakomirai	etcetc	check	check	
2022	"Becky's Plan"	Cody Jon	Non-album single	Saint Lucky Records	check	check	
2022	"Breakfast"	Thomas Headon	Victoria	Warner Music UK	check	check	
2022	"When I'm With You" (featuring Evie Irie)	Isaiah Firebrace	Non-album single	Sony Music Australia	check	check	
2021	"Operator"	Taka Perry	Non-album single	etcetc	check	check	
2021	"Get Old"	Cat & Calmell	Life of Mine	EMI Music Australia	check	check	
2021	"1234" (with Leon Fanourakis)	Taka Perry	Non-album Single	etcetc	check	check	
2021	"Luv Drunk"	A.GIRL	Non-album single	Volkanik	check	check	
2021	"Twenty" (featuring Stevan)	Taka Perry	Non-album Single	etcetc	check	check	
2021	"Bindii Patch"	Abby Bella May	I Am Sensitive	Independent	check	check	
2020	"Diamonds"	Taka Perry	Non-album single	etcetc	check	check	
2020	"Je Ne Sais Quoi"	Kirsten Salty	Non-album single	Independent	check	check	
2020	"Broken Bodies" (featuring Wifisfuneral)	Kid Blue	Non-album single	Independent	check	check	
2020	"Jesus Walks" (Triple J Like a Version featuring A.Girl and Gia Vorne)	Taka Perry	Non-album single	ABC Music	check		
2020	"Lola"	A.GIRL	Non-album single	Volkanik Music	check	check	
2020	"Only U" (featuring Gia Vorne)	Taka Perry	Non-album single	etcetc	check	check	
2020	"Nicotine"	Sycco	Non-album single	Independent	check	check	
2020	"All Over You"	A.GIRL	Non-album single	Volkanik Music	check	check	
2019	"Casual"	Thomston	Los Angeles	Warner Music	check	check	
2019	"Godsend"	Thomston	Los Angeles	Warner Music	check	check	
2019	"Find Yourself"	SACHI	Nights with Ruby	Casablanca Records	check	check	
2019	"Introspect"	Taka Perry	Non-album single	etcetc	check	check	
2019	"Kuruna" (featuring JP THE WAVY	Taka Perry	Non-album single	etcetc	check	check	
2019	"21 Orbits" (featuring Yaw. and Yergurl)	Taka Perry	Non-album single	etcetc	check	check	
2019	"Love Me First"	Stellie	Non-album single	Independent	check		
2019	"2142"	A.GIRL	Non-album single	Volkanik Music	check	check	
2019	"Play"	A.GIRL	Non-album single	Volkanik Music	check	check	
2018	"Not Thinkin' Bout You"	Ruel	Ready	RCA Records	check		ARIA: Gold; RMNZ: Gold
2018	"Younger"	Ruel	Ready	RCA Records	check		ARIA: 2x Platinum; RMNZ: Platinum
2018	"Money Problems"	Max Frost	Gold Rush	Atlantic Records	check	check	
2016	"Ten Feet Tall"	Okenyo	Ten Feet Tall	Elefant Traks		check	

=== Remixes ===
List of remixes, with year released and album shown
Title	Year	Artist(s)	Album
"Painkiller" (Taka Perry Remix)	2020	Ruel (featuring Denzel Curry)	Painkiller (Remix Pack)
"Stranger Love" (Taka Perry Remix)	2021	PNAU (featuring Budjerah)	Stranger Love
"Ready For The Sky" (Taka Perry Remix)	2022	Budjerah	Ready For The Sky
"umi tsuki" (Taka Perry Remix)	2023	SIRUP (featuring iri)	After Summer Remixes

== Accolades ==
Organisation	Year	Category	Result	Ref.
APRA Music Awards	2026	Most Performed Australian Work	Nominated	
APRA Music Awards	2026	Most Performed Pop Work	Nominated	
APRA Music Awards	2026	Billions Award	Won	
