= List of best-selling girl groups =

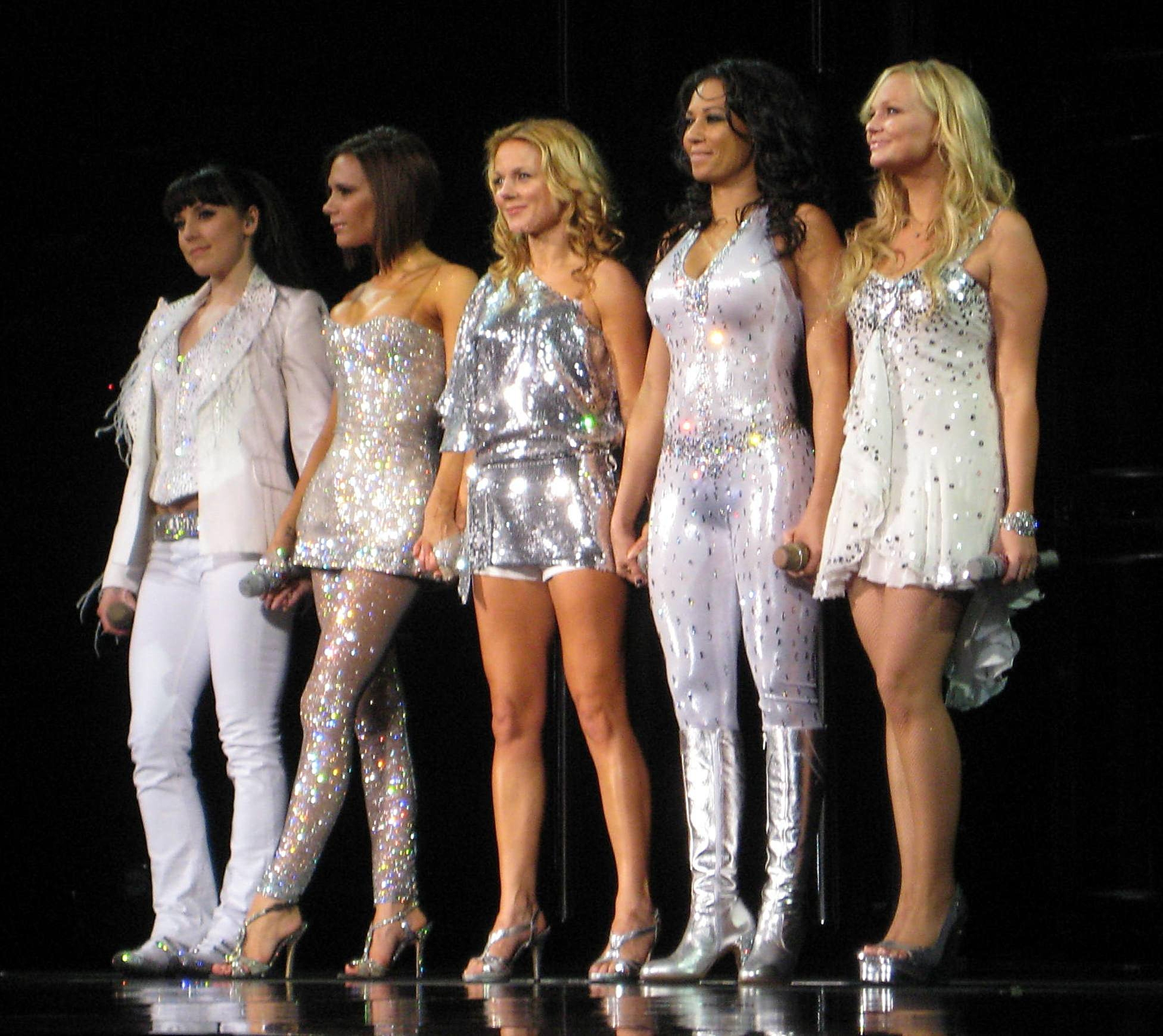
The Spice Girls (here in 2008) are the best-selling girl group in history.

A girl group is a popular music act featuring several female singers who generally harmonize together. Girl groups have been popular at least since the heyday of the Boswell Sisters beginning in the 1930s, but the term "girl group" also denotes the wave of American female pop singing groups who flourished in the late 1950s and early 1960s between the decline of early rock and roll and the British Invasion, many of whom were influenced by doo-wop style. This article covers only girl groups from that era and later. The term "girl group" also includes Japanese and Korean idol groups. In Japan, these groups began to gain popularity in the late 1990s, while in South Korea, they gained popularity in the 2000s and early 2010s. Korean girl groups make up a significant factor in the Korean Wave.

Sales figures records in most countries are not available before the 1990s, so it is difficult to accurately determine best-selling records, either by country or worldwide. Certification levels have been used for most countries, but certification was not common until the 1970s in the US and UK, and later in other countries. In addition, in many countries certification is for shipments of a record to retailers, rather than actual sales. Changes from 2010 onwards as certifications have become based on combined sales figures and streaming instead of sales alone have complicated matters further.

As a result, these tables should not be considered finalized of the best-selling records by girl groups in each country.

== Best-selling girl groups worldwide ==
Groups with claimed total record sales of more than 20 million:

Artist	Country of origin	Number of members	Period active	Genre	Studio albums	Claimed sales
Spice Girls	United Kingdom	5 → 4 → 5 → 4	1994–2000, 2007–2008, 2012, 2018–2019 (9 years)	Pop	3	100 million
The Supremes	United States	4 → 3	1959–1977, 1983, 2000 (20 years)	R&B; soul; pop	29	100 million
The Andrews Sisters	United States	3	1925–1953, 1956–1967 (39 years)	Swing; boogie-woogie	12	75 million
2NE1	South Korea	4 → 3 → 4	2009–2016, 2024–present (10 years)	K-pop	2	66 million
TLC	United States	3 → 2	1991–present (35 years)	R&B; Hip hop	5	65 million
AKB48	Japan	Rotational	2005–present (21 years)	J-pop	8	60 million
Destiny's Child	United States	4 → 3	1997–2006 (9 years)	R&B; pop	5	60 million
The Pussycat Dolls	United States	6 → 5 → 3	2003–10, 2019–2021, 2026 (8 years)	Pop; R&B	2	54 million
Little Mix	United Kingdom	4 → 3	2011–2022 (11 years)	Pop; R&B	6	50 million
Twice	South Korea	9	2015–present (11 years)	K-pop	7	47 million
Girls' Generation	South Korea	9 → 8	2007–2017, 2022 (11 years)	K-pop	10	45 million
Davichi	South Korea	2	2008–present (18 years)	K-pop	3	42 million
Bananarama	United Kingdom	3 → 2 → 3 → 2	1980–present (46 years)	Pop	11	40 million
The Pointer Sisters	United States	2 → 3 → 4 → 3 → 4	1969–present (57 years)	R&B; soul	16	40 million
T-ara	South Korea	6 → 7 → 8 → 7 → 6 → 4	2009–2017, 2020–present (15 years)	K-pop	4	35 million
Fifth Harmony	United States	5 → 4	2012–2018, 2025 (7 years)	Pop; R&B	3	33 million
Wonder Girls	South Korea	5 → 4	2007–2017 (10 years)	K-pop	3	31 million
The Nolans	United Kingdom / Ireland	5 → 4 → 5 → 4 → 3 → 2 → 4 → 5	1974–2005, 2009, 2020–2022 (34 years)	Pop	23	30 million
Sistar	South Korea	4	2010–2017 (7 years)	K-pop	2	28 million
Blackpink	South Korea	4	2016–present (10 years)	K-pop	2	23 million
Morning Musume	Japan	Rotational	1997–present (29 years)	J-pop	16	22 million
Sister Sledge	United States	4	1965-2020 (61 years)	R&B; disco	10	20 million
En Vogue	United States	4 → 3	1989–present (37 years)	R&B	8	20 million
Speed	Japan	4	1996–2001, 2003, 2008–2012 (10 years)	J-pop	5	20 million

== Best-selling girl group singles ==
=== Worldwide ===
It is extremely difficult to assess worldwide sales of singles, due to the lack of auditing in many countries, and that no country officially tracked sales before the 1990s. In the second edition of The Book of Golden Discs, author Joseph Murrell calculated a worldwide sales figure of 18 million singles for Baccara's "Yes Sir, I Can Boogie", but this figure is disputed and has never been officially confirmed. Other claimed worldwide sales figures for singles by girl groups are shown in the table below:

Released	Single	Group	Confirmed sales (Note: Sales figures obtained from certifying bodies alone)	Claimed sales
1996	"Wannabe"	Spice Girls	Total available sales: 6.820 million: US: 2.910 million; UK: 2.030 million; JPN: 200,000; GER: 500,000; FRA: 750,000; AUS: 140,000; NLD: 50,000; SWE: 15,000; DEN: 45,000; SWI: 25,000; BEL: 25,000; NZ: 10,000	7 million
2002	"The Ketchup Song (Aserejé)"	Las Ketchup	Total available sales: 5.063 million: JPN: 50,000; GER: 1 million; FRA: 750,000; UK: 692,000; AUS: 210,000; NLD: 60,000; SWE: 120,000; SWI: 120,000; BEL: 250,000; AUT: 60,000; FIN: 15,483; NZ: 20,000	7 million
2005	"Don't Cha"	The Pussycat Dolls featuring Busta Rhymes	Total available sales: 4.337 million: US: 3 million; GER: 300,000; UK: 822,000; AUS: 140,000; SWE: 10,000; SWI: 20,000; BEL: 25,000; AUT: 15,000; NZ: 5,000	6 million

A list of the best-selling singles, based on worldwide certified and confirmed unit sales (including both digital sales and equivalent track streams).

Artist	Single	Released	Confirmed sales
Fifth Harmony featuring Ty Dolla Sign	"Work from Home"	2016	9.63 million
TLC	"No Scrubs"	1999	9.05 million
Icona Pop featuring Charli XCX	"I Love It"	2012	8.74 million
The Pussycat Dolls featuring Busta Rhymes	"Don't Cha"	2005	8.658 million
The Pussycat Dolls featuring Snoop Dogg	"Buttons"	2006	7.239 million
Spice Girls	"Wannabe"	1996	7.16 million
Little Mix	"Black Magic"	2015	6.092 million
Destiny's Child	"Say My Name"	1999	5.821 million
Fifth Harmony	"Worth It"	2015	4.915 million
The Ronettes	"Sleigh Ride"	1963	4.41 million
Las Ketchup	"The Ketchup Song (Aserejé)"	2002	4.271 million
Blackpink	"Ddu-Du Ddu-Du"	2018	3.715 million
Little Mix	"Shout Out to My Ex"	2016	3.445 million
t.A.T.u.	"All the Things She Said"	2002	3.441 million
Destiny's Child	"Survivor"	2001	3.355 million
The Pussycat Dolls	"When I Grow Up"	2008	3.327 million
Destiny's Child	"Lose My Breath"	2004	3.25 million
SWV	"Weak"	1993	3.23 million
Diana Ross & the Supremes	"Someday We'll Be Together"	1969	3 million
TLC	"Waterfalls"	1995	2.965 million
Spice Girls	"2 Become 1"	1996	2.919 million
All Saints	"Never Ever"	1997	2.865 million
Earth, Wind & Fire with the Emotions	"Boogie Wonderland"	1979	2.615 million
Destiny's Child featuring T.I. and Lil Wayne	"Soldier"	2004	2.465 million
Spice Girls	"Say You'll Be There"	1996	2.425 million
The Supremes	"Where Did Our Love Go"	1964	2.415 million
Destiny's Child	"Independent Women Part I"	2000	2.394 million
En Vogue	"Don't Let Go (Love)"	1996	2.315 million
Spice Girls	"Spice Up Your Life"	1997	2.301 million
Little Mix	"Touch"	2016	2.28 million
Destiny's Child	"Cater 2 U"	2005	2.26 million
Little Mix featuring Stormzy	"Power"	2017	2.145 million
Little Mix	"Wings"	2012	2.16 million
Galantis, David Guetta and Little Mix	"Heartbreak Anthem"	2021	2.005 million
The Supremes	"I Hear a Symphony"	1965	2 million
Diana Ross & the Supremes	"Love Child"	1968	2 million
Xscape	"Just Kickin' It"	1993	2 million

=== Australia ===
Singles certified platinum or more by the Australian Recording Industry Association (ARIA). Only includes certifications since 1989, when ARIA took over compiling the Australian charts. From November 2014 onwards paid-for audio streams were included in the Australian singles chart and counted towards sales and certifications.

Certifications based on sales only

Released	Single	Group	Certification
2012	"I Love It"	Icona Pop featuring Charli XCX	5× Platinum
2002	"The Ketchup Song (Aserejé)"	Las Ketchup	3× Platinum
2012	"Wings"	Little Mix	3× Platinum
1995	"Waterfalls"	TLC	2× Platinum
1996	"Wannabe"	Spice Girls	2× Platinum
1997	"Never Ever"	All Saints	2× Platinum
2000	"Say My Name"	Destiny's Child	2× Platinum
2000	"Poison"	Bardot	2× Platinum
2000	"Independent Women"	Destiny's Child	2× Platinum
2001	"Whole Again"	Atomic Kitten	2× Platinum
2005	"Don't Cha"	The Pussycat Dolls featuring Busta Rhymes	2× Platinum
2013	"Change Your Life"	Little Mix	2× Platinum
1994	"Whatta Man"	Salt-N-Pepa with En Vogue	Platinum
1998	"C'est la Vie"	B*Witched	Platinum
1998	"Rollercoaster"	B*Witched	Platinum
1998	"Finally Found"	Honeyz	Platinum
1998	"Viva Forever"	Spice Girls	Platinum
1998	"Goodbye"	Spice Girls	Platinum
1999	"No Scrubs"	TLC	Platinum
1999	"Unpretty"	TLC	Platinum
2000	"Shackles (Praise You)"	Mary Mary	Platinum
2004	"Lose My Breath"	Destiny's Child	Platinum
2005	"Push the Button"	Sugababes	Platinum
2005	"Stickwitu"	The Pussycat Dolls	Platinum
2006	"Buttons"	The Pussycat Dolls	Platinum

Certifications based on sales + on-demand digital streaming

Released	Single	Group	Certification
2016	"Work from Home"	Fifth Harmony featuring Ty Dolla Sign	6× Platinum
2014	"Ugly Heart"	G.R.L.	4× Platinum
2014	"You Ruin Me"	The Veronicas	3× Platinum
2017	"Shout Out to My Ex"	Little Mix	3× Platinum
2015	"Worth It"	Fifth Harmony featuring Kid Ink	2× Platinum
2015	"Black Magic"	Little Mix	2× Platinum
2016	"Secret Love Song"	Little Mix featuring Jason Derulo	2× Platinum
2016	"Hair"	Little Mix featuring Sean Paul	2× Platinum
2017	"Touch"	Little Mix	2× Platinum
2023	"Cupid"	Fifty Fifty featuring Sabrina Carpenter	2× Platinum
2014	"If You Love Someone"	The Veronicas	Platinum
2016	"All in My Head (Flex)"	Fifth Harmony featuring Fetty Wap	Platinum
2016	"In My Blood"	The Veronicas	Platinum
2018	"Ddu-Du Ddu-Du"	Blackpink	Platinum
2018	"Kiss and Make Up"	Dua Lipa and Blackpink	Platinum
2018	"Woman Like Me"	Little Mix featuring Nicki Minaj	Platinum
2019	"Kill This Love"	Blackpink	Platinum
2020	"How You Like That"	Blackpink	Platinum
2020	"Ice Cream"	Blackpink and Selena Gomez	Platinum
2024	"Touch"	Katseye	Platinum
2025	"Gnarly"	Katseye	Platinum
2025	"Gabriela"	Katseye	Platinum
2025	"Jump"	Blackpink	Platinum

=== Brazil ===
Based on certifications awarded by Pro-Música Brasil. Single certifications have only been awarded since 2008, and have included audio and video streaming from 2017 onwards.

Released	Single	Group	Certification
2019	"Kill This Love"	Blackpink	2× Diamond
2025	"Gnarly"	Katseye	2× Diamond
2025	"Gabriela"	Katseye	2× Diamond
2015	"Black Magic"	Little Mix	Diamond
2018	"Ddu-Du Ddu-Du"	Blackpink	Diamond
2018	"Woman Like Me"	Little Mix featuring Nicki Minaj	Diamond
2020	"Sour Candy"	Lady Gaga and Blackpink	Diamond
2020	"How You Like That"	Blackpink	Diamond
2020	"Ice Cream"	Blackpink and Selena Gomez	Diamond
2022	"Shut Down"	Blackpink	Diamond
2024	"Touch"	Katseye	Diamond
2016	"Hair"	Little Mix	3× Platinum
2016	"Shout Out to My Ex"	Little Mix	3× Platinum
2017	"Reggaetón Lento (Remix)"	CNCO and Little Mix	3× Platinum
2020	"Lovesick Girls"	Blackpink	3× Platinum
2020	"Pretty Savage"	Blackpink	3× Platinum
2024	"Debut"	Katseye	3× Platinum
2016	"Touch"	Little Mix	2× Platinum
2017	"Power"	Little Mix featuring Stormzy	2× Platinum
2018	"Forever Young"	Blackpink	2× Platinum
2022	"Pink Venom"	Blackpink	2× Platinum
2022	"Typa Girl"	Blackpink	2× Platinum
2025	"Gameboy"	Katseye	2× Platinum
2012	"Wings"	Little Mix	Platinum
2013	"Move"	Little Mix	Platinum
2014	"Salute"	Little Mix	Platinum
2015	"Love Me Like You"	Little Mix	Platinum
2016	"Secret Love Song"	Little Mix featuring Jason Derulo	Platinum
2017	"No More Sad Songs"	Little Mix featuring Machine Gun Kelly	Platinum
2018	"Only You"	Cheat Codes and Little Mix	Platinum
2019	"Think About Us"	Little Mix	Platinum
2020	"Oh My God"	I-dle	Platinum
2020	"Bet You Wanna"	Blackpink featuring Cardi B	Platinum
2020	"Crazy Over You"	Blackpink	Platinum
2020	"Love to Hate Me"	Blackpink	Platinum
2020	"Sweet Melody"	Little Mix	Platinum
2023	"The Girls"	Blackpink	Platinum
2024	"Supernova"	Aespa	Platinum
2024	"Armageddon"	Aespa	Platinum
2025	"M.I.A."	Katseye	Platinum
2026	"Internet Girl"	Katseye	Platinum
2026	"Pinky Up"	Katseye	Platinum

=== Canada ===
Singles certified gold or more by the Music Canada.

Certifications based on sales only

Released	Single	Group	Certification	Sales (Based on certifications)
1998	"Goodbye"	Spice Girls	2× Platinum	200,000
1986	"Venus"	Bananarama	Platinum	100,000
1984	"Neutron Dance"	The Pointer Sisters	Gold	50,000
1984	"Jump (For My Love)"	The Pointer Sisters	Gold	50,000

Certifications based on sales + on-demand digital streaming

Released	Single	Group	Certification	Sales (Based on certifications)
2016	"Work from Home"	Fifth Harmony featuring Ty Dolla Sign	5× Platinum	400,000
2023	"Cupid"	Fifty Fifty	3× Platinum	240,000
2015	"Worth It"	Fifth Harmony featuring Kid Ink	2× Platinum	160,000
2020	"How You Like That"	Blackpink	2× Platinum	160,000
1995	"Waterfalls"	TLC	Platinum	80,000
2015	"Black Magic"	Little Mix	Platinum	80,000
2016	"All in My Head (Flex)"	Fifth Harmony featuring Fetty Wap	Platinum	80,000
2016	"Shout Out to My Ex"	Little Mix	Platinum	80,000
2016	"Touch"	Little Mix	Platinum	80,000
2018	"Kiss and Make Up"	Dua Lipa and Blackpink	Platinum	80,000
2020	"Ice Cream"	Blackpink and Selena Gomez	Platinum	80,000
2022	"Pink Venom"	Blackpink	Platinum	80,000
2022	"Shut Down"	Blackpink	Platinum	80,000
2024	"Touch"	Katseye	Platinum	80,000
2025	"Gnarly"	Katseye	Platinum	80,000
2025	"Gabriela"	Katseye	Platinum	80,000
2025	"Jump"	Blackpink	Platinum	80,000
1994	"Creep"	TLC	Gold	40,000
2014	"Sledgehammer"	Fifth Harmony	Gold	40,000
2016	"That´s My Girl"	Fifth Harmony	Gold	40,000
2017	"Down"	Fifth Harmony	Gold	40,000
2018	"Woman Like Me"	Little Mix	Gold	40,000
2020	"Sour Candy"	Lady Gaga and Blackpink	Gold	40,000
2024	"Debut"	Katseye	Gold	40,000

=== Denmark ===
Released	Single	Group	Certification
1999	"Work from Home"	Fifth Harmony featuring Ty Dolla Sign	2× Platinum
1963	"Sleigh Ride"	The Ronettes	Platinum
1979	"Boogie Wonderland"	Earth, Wind & Fire with the Emotions	Platinum
1982	"It's Raining Men"	The Weather Girls	Platinum
1984	"I'm So Excited"	The Pointer Sisters	Platinum
1999	"No Scrubs"	TLC	Platinum
1999	"Say My Name"	Destiny's Child	Platinum
2001	"Survivor"	Destiny's Child	Platinum
2015	"Worth It"	Fifth Harmony featuring Kid Ink	Platinum
2016	"Shout Out to My Ex"	Little Mix	Platinum
1966	"You Can't Hurry Love"	The Supremes	Gold
1995	"Waterfalls"	TLC	Gold
1996	"Wannabe"	Spice Girls	Gold
2001	"Whole Again"	Atomic Kitten	Gold
2006	"Wait a Minute"	The Pussycat Dolls featuring Timbaland	Gold
2014	"Wild Wild Love"	Pitbull featuring G.R.L.	Gold
2014	"Ugly Heart"	G.R.L.	Gold
2015	"The Girl Is Mine"	99 Souls featuring Destiny's Child and Brandy	Gold
2015	"Black Magic"	Little Mix	Gold
2015	"Love Me or Leave Me"	Little Mix	Gold
2016	"Secret Love Song"	Little Mix featuring Jason Derulo	Gold
2017	"Power"	Little Mix featuring Stormzy	Gold
2017	"Reggaetón Lento (Remix)"	CNCO and Little Mix	Gold
2018	"Woman Like Me"	Little Mix featuring Nicki Minaj	Gold
2021	"Heartbreak Anthem"	Galantis, David Guetta and Little Mix	Gold

=== France ===
Certifications based on sales only

Released	Single	Group	Certification	Sales (Based on certifications)
1996	"Wannabe"	Spice Girls	Diamond	750,000
2001	"Toutes les femmes de ta vie"	L5	Diamond	750,000
2002	"The Ketchup Song (Aserejé)"	Las Ketchup	Diamond	750,000
1996	"Say You'll Be There"	Spice Girls	Gold	250,000
1996	"2 Become 1"	Spice Girls	Gold	250,000
1997	"I Wanna Be the Only One"	Eternal featuring BeBe Winans	Gold	250,000
1997	"Who Do You Think You Are"	Spice Girls	Gold	250,000
1997	"Spice Up Your Life"	Spice Girls	Gold	250,000
1997	"Too Much"	Spice Girls	Gold	250,000
1998	"Stop"	Spice Girls	Gold	250,000
1998	"Viva Forever"	Spice Girls	Gold	250,000
1999	"No Scrubs"	TLC	Gold	250,000
2000	"Pure Shores"	All Saints	Gold	250,000

Certifications based on sales + on-demand digital streaming

Released	Single	Group	Certification
2016	"Work from Home"	Fifth Harmony featuring Ty Dolla Sign	Diamond
2025	"Gabriela"	Katseye	Diamond
2025	"Jump"	Blackpink	Diamond
2018	"Ddu-Du Ddu-Du"	Blackpink	Platinum
2019	"Kill This Love"	Blackpink	Platinum
2020	"How You Like That"	Blackpink	Platinum
2016	"That´s My Girl"	Fifth Harmony	Gold
2022	"Pink Venom"	Blackpink	Gold
2022	"Shut Down"	Blackpink	Gold
2024	"Touch"	Katseye	Gold
2025	"Gnarly"	Katseye	Gold

=== Germany ===
Certifications based on sales only

Released	Single	Group	Certification	Sales (Based on certifications)
2002	"The Ketchup Song (Aserejé)"	Las Ketchup	2× Platinum	1,000,000
2001	"Whole Again"	Atomic Kitten	Platinum	500,000
2001	"Daylight in Your Eyes"	No Angels	Platinum	500,000
1996	"Wannabe"	Spice Girls	Platinum	500,000
2006	"Shame"	Monrose	3× Gold	450,000
1996	"Waterfalls"	TLC	Gold	250,000
1996	"Don't Let Go (Love)"	En Vogue	Gold	250,000
1997	"Who Do You Think You Are"/"Mama"	Spice Girls	Gold	250,000
1998	"Viva Forever"	Spice Girls	Gold	250,000
2000	"Overload"	Sugababes	Gold	250,000
2005	"Push the Button"	Sugababes	Gold	250,000

Certifications based on sales + on-demand digital streaming

Released	Single	Group	Certification
2002	"All the Things She Said"	t.A.T.u.	2× Platinum
2005	"Don't Cha"	The Pussycat Dolls featuring Busta Rhymes	2× Platinum
2016	"Work from Home"	Fifth Harmony featuring Ty Dolla Sign	Platinum, 3× Gold
2016	"Worth It"	Fifth Harmony featuring Kid Ink	Platinum
1982	"It's Raining Men"	The Weather Girls	Gold
1982	"I'm So Excited"	The Pointer Sisters	Gold
1999	"Say My Name" (Timbaland remix)	Destiny's Child featuring Static Major	Gold
2000	"Independent Women Part I"	Destiny's Child	Gold
2001	"Survivor"	Destiny's Child	Gold
2004	"Lose My Breath"	Destiny's Child	Gold
2006	"Beep"	The Pussycat Dolls featuring will.i.am	Gold
2007	"About You Now"	Sugababes	Gold
2008	"When I Grow Up"	The Pussycat Dolls	Gold
2016	"Shout Out To My Ex"	Little Mix	Gold

- Note: Certification levels in Germany have changed several times over the years – the certification level for a gold single was 250,000 until the end of 2002, 150,000 between 2003 and mid-2014, and 200,000 from mid-2014 onwards. These different levels are reflected in the table above.
- From January 2014 onwards, paid-for audio streams were included in the German singles chart and counted towards sales and certifications.

=== Italy ===
Released	Single	Group	Certification
2016	"Work from Home"	Fifth Harmony featuring Ty Dolla Sign	3× Platinum
2012	"I Love It"	Icona Pop featuring Charli XCX	2× Platinum
2015	"Worth It"	Fifth Harmony featuring Kid Ink	2× Platinum
1996	"Wannabe"	Spice Girls	Platinum
1963	"Be My Baby"	The Ronettes	Gold
1963	"Sleigh Ride"	The Ronettes	Gold
1966	"You Can't Hurry Love"	The Supremes	Gold
1999	"No Scrubs"	TLC	Gold
2001	"Survivor"	Destiny's Child	Gold
2002	"All the Things She Said"	t.A.T.u.	Gold
2005	"Don't Cha"	The Pussycat Dolls featuring Busta Rhymes	Gold
2015	"Black Magic"	Little Mix	Gold
2016	"All in My Head (Flex)"	Fifth Harmony featuring Fetty Wap	Gold
2016	"Sin Contrato"	Maluma featuring Fifth Harmony	Gold
2016	"Shout Out to My Ex"	Little Mix	Gold
2016	"Touch"	Little Mix	Gold
2018	"Kiss and Make Up"	Dua Lipa and Blackpink	Gold
2020	"How You Like That"	Blackpink	Gold
2021	"Heartbreak Anthem"	Galantis, David Guetta and Little Mix	Gold

=== Japan ===
The ten biggest-selling girl group singles in Japan based on total sales (May 2020):

Released	Single	Group	Detailed Sales			Total Sales
Released	Single	Group	Physical	Downloads	Ringtones	Total Sales
2010	"Heavy Rotation"	AKB48	880,761	1,500,000	750,000	3,130,761
2011	"Flying Get"	AKB48	1,625,849	1,000,000	500,000	3,125,849
2011	"Everyday, Katyusha"	AKB48	1,608,299	1,000,000	500,000	3,108,299
2018	"Teacher Teacher"	AKB48	2,922,460	—	—	2,922,460
2017	"Negaigoto no Mochigusare"	AKB48	2,649,234	—	—	2,649,234
2013	"Koi Suru Fortune Cookie"	AKB48	1,533,955	1,000,000	—	2,533,955
2016	"Tsubasa wa Iranai"	AKB48	2,499,785	—	—	2,499,785
2010	"Gee"	Girls' Generation	206,000	1,000,000	1,250,000	2,456,000
2012	"Manatsu no Sounds Good"	AKB48	1,822,220	500,000	—	2,322,220
2011	"Mr. Taxi"	Girls' Generation	174,365	1,000,000	1,000,000	2,174,365
2009	"Mister"	Kara	145,000	1,000,000	1,000,000	2,145,000
2013	"Sayonara Crawl"	AKB48	1,955,800	100,000	—	2,055,800

- From January 2014, RIAJ changed calculation method for Detailed Sales and the Gold Record.

=== New Zealand ===
Singles certified platinum or more by Recorded Music NZ. Since November 2014 certifications for singles have included streaming, and therefore cannot be compared to certifications from before this date.

Certifications based on sales only

Released	Single	Group	Certification
2001	"Whole Again"	Atomic Kitten	2× Platinum
2002	"The Ketchup Song (Aserejé)"	Las Ketchup	2× Platinum
1995	"Waterfalls"	TLC	Platinum
1996	"Wannabe"	Spice Girls	Platinum
1996	"Say You'll Be There"	Spice Girls	Platinum
1997	"I Wanna Be the Only One"	Eternal featuring BeBe Winans	Platinum
1997	"Spice Up Your Life"	Spice Girls	Platinum
1998	"Viva Forever"	Spice Girls	Platinum
1998	"Rollercoaster"	B*witched	Platinum
1998	"Goodbye"	Spice Girls	Platinum
1999	"No Scrubs"	TLC	Platinum

Certifications based on sales + on-demand digital streaming

Released	Single	Group	Certification
1999	"No Scrubs"	TLC	9× Platinum
2000	"Say My Name"	Destiny's Child	5x Platinum
2016	"Work from Home"	Fifth Harmony featuring Ty Dolla Sign	5x Platinum
1995	"Waterfalls"	TLC	4× Platinum
2005	"Don't Cha"	The Pussycat Dolls featuring Busta Rhymes	3× Platinum
1979	"Boogie Wonderland"	Earth, Wind and Fire with the Emotions	2× Platinum
2005	"Cater 2 U"	Destiny's Child	2× Platinum
2005	"Push the Button"	Sugababes	2× Platinum
2013	"Crooked Smile"	J. Cole featuring TLC	2× Platinum
2015	"Worth It"	Fifth Harmony featuring Kid Ink	2× Platinum
2016	"All in My Head (Flex)"	Fifth Harmony featuring Fetty Wap	2× Platinum
1966	"You Can't Hurry Love"	The Supremes	Platinum
1981	"Slow Hand"	The Pointer Sisters	Platinum
1982	"It's Raining Men"	The Weather Girls	Platinum
1984	"I'm So Excited"	The Pointer Sisters	Platinum
1984	"Jump (For My Love)"	The Pointer Sisters	Platinum
1989	"Eternal Flame"	The Bangles	Platinum
1993	"Weak"	SWV	Platinum
1993	"Right Here"	SWV	Platinum
1994	"Whatta Man"	Salt-N-Pepa with En Vogue	Platinum
1996	"Don't Let Go (Love)"	En Vogue	Platinum
1999	"Bills, Bills, Bills"	Destiny's Child	Platinum
2000	"Shackles (Praise You)"	Mary Mary	Platinum
2000	"Jumpin', Jumpin'"	Destiny's Child	Platinum
2000	"Independent Women Part I"	Destiny's Child	Platinum
2000	"Pure Shores"	All Saints	Platinum
2001	"Survivor"	Destiny's Child	Platinum
2001	"Bootylicious"	Destiny's Child	Platinum
2002	"All the Things She Said"	t.A.T.u.	Platinum
2004	"Soldier"	Destiny's Child featuring T.I. and Lil Wayne	Platinum
2005	"Girl"	Destiny's Child	Platinum
2005	"Cater 2 U"		Platinum
2006	"Buttons"	The Pussycat Dolls featuring Snoop Dogg	Platinum
2006	"Stickwitu"	The Pussycat Dolls	Platinum
2007	"About You Now"	Sugababes	Platinum
2008	"When I Grow Up"	The Pussycat Dolls	Platinum
2016	"Secret Love Song"	Little Mix featuring Jason Derulo	Platinum
2016	"That´s My Girl"	Fifth Harmony	Platinum
2018	"Ddu-Du Ddu-Du"	Blackpink	Platinum
2018	"Kiss and Make Up"	Dua Lipa and Blackpink	Platinum
2019	"Kill This Love"	Blackpink	Platinum
2020	"How You Like That"	Blackpink	Platinum
2022	"Pink Venom"	Blackpink	Platinum
2023	"Cupid"	Fifty Fifty	Platinum
2024	"Touch"	Katseye	Platinum
2025	"Gabriela"	Katseye	Platinum

=== South Korea ===
Prior to Gaon Music Chart establishment (pre–2010)

The Gaon Music Chart, which was later renamed the Circle Chart, was established in January 2010. As a result, there are no available official sales data for singles released prior to that time. Nevertheless, there are unofficial claimed sales for some earlier releases.

Released	Song	Group	Claimed sales
2009	"Gee"	Girls' Generation	5,000,000
2008	"Nobody"	Wonder Girls	4,600,000
2009	"I Don't Care"	2NE1	4,500,000

Prior to certification (2010–2017)

South Korea experienced a decline in digital music sales volume which began in late 2012. The price of digital downloads was greatly inflated, and as a result, no girl group songs released since 2013 have surpassed the three million sales mark.

Released	Song	Group	Sales
2011	"Roly-Poly"	T-ara	4,411,209
2011	"Don't Say Goodbye"	Davichi	4,021,547
2011	"So Cool"	Sistar	4,011,945
2011	"Be My Baby"	Wonder Girls	3,919,684
2011	"I Am the Best"	2NE1	3,795,020
2011	"Cry Cry"	T-ara	3,783,925
2012	"Lovey-Dovey"	T-ara	3,758,864
2011	"The Boys"	Girls' Generation	3,623,330
2011	"Good Bye Baby"	Miss A	3,589,321
2012	"Loving U"	Sistar	3,438,000
2012	"Alone"	Sistar	3,422,141
2010	"Bad Girl Good Girl"	Miss A	3,334,684
2011	"Ugly"	2NE1	3,324,861
2010	"Oh!"	Girls' Generation	3,316,889
2011	"Hot Summer"	f(x)	3,046,546
2010	"I Go Crazy Because of You"	T-ara	3,042,224
2011	"Lonely"	2NE1	3,040,386
2011	"Starlight Moonlight"	Secret	3,016,717

After certification (2018–present)

The Circle Chart stopped releasing download sales in December 2017. However, the chart began implementing record certifications in April 2018, at a level of 2,500,000 sales per Platinum level. Every song released since 1 January 2018 is eligible for a certification.

Released	Song	Group	Certification	Sales (Based on certifications)
2018	"Bboom Bboom"	Momoland	Platinum	2,500,000
2018	"Starry Night"	Mamamoo	Platinum	2,500,000
2018	"Travel"	BOL4	Platinum	2,500,000
2018	"Ddu-Du Ddu-Du"	Blackpink	Platinum	2,500,000
2018	"Forever Young"	Blackpink	Platinum	2,500,000
2018	"Bad Boy"	Red Velvet	Platinum	2,500,000
2018	"Power Up"	Red Velvet	Platinum	2,500,000
2018	"Dance The Night Away"	Twice	Platinum	2,500,000
2018	"What Is Love?"	Twice	Platinum	2,500,000
2018	"Yes or Yes"	Twice	Platinum	2,500,000

=== Spain ===
Released	Single	Group	Certification
2015	"Work from Home"	Fifth Harmony featuring Ty Dolla Sign	2× Platinum
1963	"Be My Baby"	The Ronettes	Platinum
1982	"I'm So Excited"	The Pointer Sisters	Platinum
1996	"Wannabe"	Spice Girls	Platinum
2012	"I Love It"	Icona Pop featuring Charli XCX	Platinum
2016	"Sin Contrato"	Maluma featuring Fifth Harmony	Platinum
2018	"Kiss and Make Up"	Dua Lipa and Blackpink	Platinum
1963	"Sleigh Ride"	The Ronettes	Gold
1966	"You Can't Hurry Love"	The Supremes	Gold
1979	"Boogie Wonderland"	Earth, Wind & Fire with the Emotions	Gold
1982	"It's Raining Men"	The Weather Girls	Gold
1999	"No Scrubs"	TLC	Gold
1999	"Say My Name"	Destiny's Child	Gold
2002	"All the Things She Said"	t.A.T.u.	Gold
2005	"Don't Cha"	The Pussycat Dolls featuring Busta Rhymes	Gold
2015	"Worth It"	Fifth Harmony featuring Kid Ink	Gold
2016	"Shout Out to My Ex"	Little Mix	Gold
2018	"Ddu-Du Ddu-Du"	Blackpink	Gold
2019	"Kill This Love"	Blackpink	Gold
2020	"How You Like That"	Blackpink	Gold
2021	"Heartbreak Anthem"	Galantis, David Guetta and Little Mix	Gold
2025	"Jump"	Blackpink	Gold

=== Sweden ===
There were few certifications awarded in Sweden before 1996, so singles before this date are not represented in this list. There have been three different certification levels since 1996: from 1996 to June 2003 the gold/platinum levels for singles were 15,000/30,000, from July 2003 to September 2010 the levels were 10,000/20,000, and from October 2010 onwards, when streaming was included in the certification levels, the levels have been 20,000/40,000. The tables below reflect these changes in certification levels.

Certifications based on sales only

Released	Single	Group	Certification	Sales (Based on certifications)
2002	"The Ketchup Song (Aserejé)"	Las Ketchup	4× Platinum	120,000
1998	"Spice Up Your Life"	Spice Girls	Platinum	30,000
1999	"Unpretty"	TLC	Platinum	30,000
2001	"Need to Know (Eenie Meenie Miny Moe)"	Excellence	Platinum	30,000
2001	"Independent Women Part 1"	Destiny's Child	Platinum	30,000
2002	"All the Things She Said"	t.A.T.u.	Platinum	30,000
2002	"Never Let It Go"	Afro-dite	Platinum	30,000
2005	"Push the Button"	Sugababes	Platinum	20,000
1996	"Wannabe"	Spice Girls	Gold	15,000
1997	"I Wanna Be the Only One"	Eternal featuring BeBe Winans	Gold	15,000
1997	"Mama"	Spice Girls	Gold	15,000
1998	"Viva Forever"	Spice Girls	Gold	15,000
1998	"Goodbye"	Spice Girls	Gold	15,000
1999	"No Scrubs"	TLC	Gold	15,000
2001	"Survivor"	Destiny's Child	Gold	15,000

Certifications based on sales + on-demand digital streaming

Released	Single	Group	Certification	Sales + streaming (Based on certifications)
2016	"Work from Home"	Fifth Harmony featuring Ty Dolla Sign	4× Platinum	160,000
2015	"Emergency"	Icona Pop	2× Platinum	80,000
2012	"I Love It"	Icona Pop featuring Charli XCX	Platinum	40,000
2014	"Sledgehammer"	Fifth Harmony	Platinum	40,000
2015	"Worth It"	Fifth Harmony featuring Kid Ink	Platinum	40,000

=== Switzerland ===
Released	Single	Group	Sales
2002	"All The Things She Said"	t.A.T.u	40,000
1996	"Wannabe"	Spice Girls	25,000
1998	"Viva Forever"	Spice Girls	25,000
1997	"Never Ever"	All Saints	25,000
2001	"Whole Again"	Atomic Kitten	20,000
2004	"Lose My Breath"	Destiny's Child	20,000
2005	"Don't Cha"	The Pussycat Dolls featuring Busta Rhymes	20,000
2016	"Shout Out to My Ex"	Little Mix	20,000
2017	"Reggaetón Lento (Remix)"	CNCO and Little Mix	20,000
2018	"Woman Like Me"	Little Mix feat. Nicki Minaj	10,000

=== United Kingdom ===
Since July 2014, certifications have included audio streams so they cannot be compared to sales-only certifications before this date. The ten biggest-selling girl group singles in the United Kingdom:

Physical and digital sales only (before July 2014)

Released	Single	Group	Sales
1996	"Wannabe"	Spice Girls	1,400,000
1997	"Never Ever"	All Saints	1,363,504
1996	"2 Become 1"	Spice Girls	1,150,000
2001	"Whole Again"	Atomic Kitten	1,021,465
1996	"Say You'll Be There"	Spice Girls	968,244
1998	"C'est la Vie"	B*Witched	925,000
1998	"Goodbye"	Spice Girls	896,000
1997	"Spice Up Your Life"	Spice Girls	887,000
2000	"Pure Shores"	All Saints	815,000
1997	"Mama"/"Who Do You Think You Are"	Spice Girls	732,000

Physical and digital sales + on-demand digital streaming (after July 2014)

The following singles have been certified platinum or higher by the BPI in the UK.

Released	Single	Group	Certification	Units
1999	"No Scrubs"	TLC	5× Platinum	3,472,933
1996	"Wannabe"	Spice Girls	5× Platinum	3,032,623
2016	"Shout Out to My Ex"	Little Mix	4× Platinum	2,400,000
2015	"Black Magic"	Little Mix	3× Platinum	2,300,000
2000	"Say My Name"	Destiny's Child	3× Platinum	2,122,942
2016	"Work from Home"	Fifth Harmony featuring Ty Dolla Sign	3× Platinum	1,800,000
2016	"Touch"	Little Mix	3× Platinum	1,800,000
2017	"Power"	Little Mix featuring Stormzy	3× Platinum	1,800,000
2015	"Secret Love Song"	Little Mix featuring Jason Derulo	3× Platinum	1,800,000
2017	"Reggaetón Lento (Remix)"	Little Mix with CNCO	2× Platinum	1,400,000
2007	"About You Now"	Sugababes	2× Platinum	1,250,000
1963	"Sleigh Ride"	The Ronettes	2× Platinum	1,200,000
1997	"2 Become 1"	Spice Girls	2× Platinum	1,200,000
1997	"Spice Up Your Life"	Spice Girls	2× Platinum	1,200,000
1998	"C'est la Vie"	B*Witched	2× Platinum	1,200,000
2000	"Pure Shores"	All Saints	2× Platinum	1,200,000
2001	"Survivor"	Destiny's Child	2× Platinum	1,200,000
2001	"Whole Again"	Atomic Kitten	2× Platinum	1,200,000
2002	"All the Things She Said"	t.A.T.u.	2× Platinum	1,200,000
2002	"Sound of the Underground"	Girls Aloud	2× Platinum	1,200,000
2005	"Push the Button"	Sugababes	2× Platinum	1,200,000
2005	"Don't Cha"	The Pussycat Dolls featuring Busta Rhymes	2× Platinum	1,200,000
2015	"The Girl Is Mine"	99 Souls featuring Destiny's Child and Brandy	2× Platinum	1,200,000
2018	"Woman Like Me"	Little Mix featuring Nicki Minaj	2× Platinum	1,200,000
2021	"Heartbreak Anthem"	Little Mix, Galantis and David Guetta	2× Platinum	1,200,000
1979	"Boogie Wonderland"	Earth, Wind & Fire with the Emotions	Gold + Platinum	1,100,000
1982	"It's Raining Men"	The Weather Girls	Gold + Platinum	1,100,000
2012	"Wings"	Little Mix	Platinum	1,100,000
2020	"Sweet Melody"	Little Mix	Platinum	1,100,000
2016	"Hair"	Little Mix featuring Sean Paul	Platinum	927,000
2017	"No More Sad Songs"	Little Mix featuring Machine Gun Kelly	Platinum	848,000
2015	"Love Me Like You"	Little Mix	Platinum	811,000
1998	"I Wanna Be the Only One"	Eternal	Platinum	728,000
2001	"Bootylicious"	Destiny's Child	Platinum	646,000
2013	"Move"	Little Mix	Platinum	684,000
2018	"Only You"	Little Mix and Cheat Codes	Platinum	615,000
1963	"Be My Baby"	The Ronettes	Platinum	600,000
1964	"Dancing in the Street"	Martha and the Vandellas	Platinum	600,000
1964	"Baby Love"	The Supremes	Platinum	600,000
1966	"You Can't Hurry Love"	The Supremes	Platinum	600,000
1984	"I'm So Excited"	The Pointer Sisters	Platinum	600,000
1995	"Waterfalls"	TLC	Platinum	600,000
1996	"Don't Let Go (Love)"	En Vogue	Platinum	600,000
1998	"Stop"	Spice Girls	Platinum	600,000
1999	"Bills, Bills, Bills"	Destiny's Child	Platinum	600,000
2000	"Jumpin', Jumpin'"	Destiny's Child	Platinum	600,000
2000	"Independent Women Part I"	Destiny's Child	Platinum	600,000
2000	"Shackles (Praise You)"	Mary Mary	Platinum	600,000
2002	"The Promise"	Girls Aloud	Platinum	600,000
2002	"The Tide Is High (Get the Feeling)"	Atomic Kitten	Platinum	600,000
2004	"Lose My Breath"	Destiny's Child	Platinum	600,000
2008	"When I Grow Up"	The Pussycat Dolls	Platinum	600,000
2009	"Jai Ho! (You Are My Destiny)"	The Pussycat Dolls and A. R. Rahman featuring Nicole Scherzinger	Platinum	600,000
2010	"Higher"	The Saturdays	Platinum	600,000
2012	"What About Us"	The Saturdays featuring Sean Paul	Platinum	600,000
2012	"Black Heart"	Stooshe	Platinum	600,000
2014	"Salute"	Little Mix	Platinum	600,000
2014	"Ugly Heart"	G.R.L	Platinum	600,000
2015	"Worth It"	Fifth Harmony	Platinum	600,000
2016	"That´s My Girl"	Fifth Harmony	Platinum	600,000
2020	"Break Up Song"	Little Mix	Platinum	600,000
2021	"Kiss My (Uh-Oh)"	Little Mix and Anne-Marie	Platinum	600,000
2021	"Confetti"	Little Mix	Platinum	600,000

=== United States ===
Sales figures of records in the US were not tracked accurately until May 1991, when Nielsen SoundScan started recording sales of singles and albums electronically at point of sale, rather than relying on figures provided to them by record store staff. As a result, there are no reliable sales figures available before this date, and therefore it is not possible to rank the best-selling singles by girl groups in the US in sales order.

Since 2013 certifications have included legal on-demand digital streams – separate figures for the pure sales component of singles released after 2013 are not available so they cannot be compared to sales-only certifications before this date.

Certifications based on sales only

RIAA sales certifications began in the US in 1958 – there are very few records with certifications before this date. Until 1988 a million-seller received a gold certification (and a two million-seller received a platinum certification). From 1989 onwards the levels were revised so that a million-seller received a platinum certification instead, with multi-platinum awards for multiple million sales. However, these pre- and post-1989 certification levels are not currently reflected in the RIAA database.

The following singles have been certified by RIAA as selling one million copies or more in the US.

Released	Single	Group	Certification	Certified sales	Reported sales
Certifications issued up to 1988
1977	"Best of My Love"	The Emotions	Gold	1,000,000	1,800,000
1965	"A Lover's Concerto"	The Toys	Gold	1,000,000	
1971	"Want Ads"	Honey Cone	Gold	1,000,000	
1971	"Stick-Up"	Honey Cone	Gold	1,000,000	
1975	"Lady Marmalade"	Labelle	Gold	1,000,000	
1975	"Fly, Robin, Fly"	Silver Convention	Gold	1,000,000	
1976	"Get Up and Boogie"	Silver Convention	Gold	1,000,000	
1977	"Angel in Your Arms"	Hot	Gold	1,000,000	
1979	"Boogie Wonderland"	Earth, Wind & Fire with the Emotions	Gold	1,000,000	
1979	"You Gonna Make Me Love Somebody Else"	The Jones Girls	Gold	1,000,000	
1979	"We Are Family"	Sister Sledge	Gold	1,000,000	
1979	"Fire"	The Pointer Sisters	Gold	1,000,000	
1980	"Sukiyaki"	A Taste of Honey	Gold	1,000,000	
1980	"He's So Shy"	The Pointer Sisters	Gold	1,000,000	
1981	"Slow Hand"	The Pointer Sisters	Gold	1,000,000	
1982	"We Got the Beat"	The Go-Go's	Gold	1,000,000	
Certifications issued from 1989 to 2012
1996	"Wannabe"	Spice Girls	Platinum	1,000,000	2,910,000
1969	"Someday We'll Be Together"	Diana Ross & the Supremes	Platinum	1,000,000	2,000,000
1974	"When Will I See You Again"	The Three Degrees	Platinum	1,000,000	2,000,000
1977	"Best of My Love"	The Emotions	Platinum	1,000,000	1,800,000
1995	"Creep"	TLC	Platinum	1,000,000	1,400,000
1997	"Don't Let Go (Love)"	En Vogue	Platinum	1,000,000	1,300,000
1998	"No, No, No"	Destiny's Child	Platinum	1,000,000	1,300,000
1995	"Waterfalls"	TLC	Platinum	1,000,000	1,200,000
1997	"G.H.E.T.T.O.U.T."	Changing Faces	Platinum	1,000,000	1,200,000
1998	"Lately"	Divine	Platinum	1,000,000	1,100,000
1968	"I'm Gonna Make You Love Me"	Diana Ross & the Supremes and the Temptations	Platinum	1,000,000	1,000,000
1987	"Push It"	Salt-N-Pepa	Platinum	1,000,000	
1989	"Expression"	Salt-N-Pepa	Platinum	1,000,000	
1990	"Hold On"	En Vogue	Platinum	1,000,000	
1992	"Ain't 2 Proud 2 Beg"	TLC	Platinum	1,000,000	
1992	"Baby-Baby-Baby"	TLC	Platinum	1,000,000	
1993	"Whatta Man"	Salt-N-Pepa with En Vogue	Platinum	1,000,000	
1994	"Stroke You Up"	Changing Faces	Platinum	1,000,000	
2005	"Don't Cha"	The Pussycat Dolls featuring Busta Rhymes	Platinum	1,000,000	
2005	"Stickwitu"	The Pussycat Dolls	Platinum	1,000,000	
2006	"Buttons"	The Pussycat Dolls featuring Snoop Dogg	Platinum	1,000,000	
2008	"Damaged"	Danity Kane	Platinum	1,000,000	
2008	"I Hate This Part"	The Pussycat Dolls	Platinum	1,000,000	
1961	"Please Mr. Postman"	The Marvelettes	Gold	500,000	
1964	"Dancing in the Street"	Martha and the Vandellas	Gold	500,000	
1964	"Baby Love"	The Supremes	Gold	500,000	1,000,000
1965	"Stop! In the Name of Love"	The Supremes	Gold	500,000	1,000,000
1965	"Don't Mess with Bill"	The Marvelettes	Gold	500,000	
1986	"Walk Like an Egyptian"	The Bangles	Gold	500,000	

Certifications based on sales + on-demand digital streaming

Released	Single	Group	Certification	Certified sales
Certifications issued from 2013 onwards
1999	"No Scrubs"	TLC	5× Platinum	5,000,000
2005	"Don't Cha"	The Pussycat Dolls featuring Busta Rhymes	5× Platinum	5,000,000
2006	"Buttons"	The Pussycat Dolls featuring Snoop Dogg	5× Platinum	5,000,000
2016	"Work from Home"	Fifth Harmony featuring Ty Dolla Sign	5× Platinum	5,000,000
1963	"Sleigh Ride"	The Ronettes	3× Platinum	3,000,000
1993	"Weak"	SWV	3× Platinum	3,000,000
1999	"Say My Name"	Destiny's Child	3× Platinum	3,000,000
2005	"Stickwitu"	The Pussycat Dolls	3× Platinum	3,000,000
2015	"Worth It"	Fifth Harmony featuring Kid Ink	3× Platinum	3,000,000
1993	"Just Kickin' It"	Xscape	2× Platinum	2,000,000
1992	"Right Here"	SWV	Platinum	1,000,000
1993	"I'm So into You"	SWV	Platinum	1,000,000
1993	"Understanding"	Xscape	Platinum	1,000,000
1995	"Who Can I Run To"	Xscape	Platinum	1,000,000
1999	"Bills, Bills, Bills"	Destiny's Child	Platinum	1,000,000
2000	"Jumpin', Jumpin'"	Destiny's Child	Platinum	1,000,000
2000	"Independent Women Part I"	Destiny's Child	Platinum	1,000,000
2000	"Shackles (Praise You)"	Mary Mary	Platinum	1,000,000
2001	"Survivor"	Destiny's Child	Platinum	1,000,000
2001	"Bootylicious"	Destiny's Child	Platinum	1,000,000
2004	"Lose My Breath"	Destiny's Child	Platinum	1,000,000
2004	"Cater 2 U"	Destiny's Child	Platinum	1,000,000
2005	"Soldier"	Destiny's Child featuring T.I. and Lil Wayne	Platinum	1,000,000
2006	"Beep"	The Pussycat Dolls featuring will.i.am	Platinum	1,000,000
2006	"Wait a Minute"	The Pussycat Dolls featuring Timbaland	Platinum	1,000,000
2014	"Boss"	Fifth Harmony	Platinum	1,000,000
2014	"Sledgehammer"	Fifth Harmony	Platinum	1,000,000
2016	"All in My Head (Flex)"	Fifth Harmony	Platinum	1,000,000
2025	"Strategy"	Twice	Platinum	1,000,000

In addition, the following singles have been stated as selling one million copies or more in the US – however, they have not been certified by the RIAA.

Released	Single	Group
1954	"Mr. Sandman"	The Chordettes
1958	"Lollipop"	The Chordettes
1961	"Will You Love Me Tomorrow"	The Shirelles
1962	"Soldier Boy"	The Shirelles
1962	"He's a Rebel"	The Crystals
1963	"He's So Fine"	The Chiffons
1963	"Da Doo Ron Ron"	The Crystals
1963	"My Boyfriend's Back"	The Angels
1963	"Be My Baby"	The Ronettes
1964	"Chapel of Love"	The Dixie Cups
1964	"Where Did Our Love Go"	The Supremes
1964	"Come See About Me"	The Supremes
1964	"Leader of the Pack"	The Shangri-Las
1965	"Stop! In the Name of Love"	The Supremes
1965	"Back in My Arms Again"	The Supremes
1965	"Nothing but Heartaches"	The Supremes
1965	"I Hear a Symphony"	The Supremes
1966	"My World Is Empty Without You"	The Supremes
1966	"You Can't Hurry Love"	The Supremes
1966	"You Keep Me Hangin' On"	The Supremes
1967	"Love Is Here and Now You're Gone"	The Supremes
1967	"The Happening"	The Supremes
1967	"Reflections"	Diana Ross and the Supremes
1968	"Love Child"	Diana Ross and the Supremes
1970	"Up the Ladder to the Roof"	The Supremes
1971	"Stoned Love"	The Supremes
1971	"Nathan Jones"	The Supremes
1971	"Floy Joy"	The Supremes

== See also ==
- List of best-selling music artists
- List of best-selling singles
- List of best-selling albums
- List of girl groups
