= Ready (Ruel EP) =

EP by Ruel
- Released: 15 June 2018
- Length: 18:03
- Label: RCA; Sony
- Producer: M-Phazes

Ruel chronology
Ready (2018)	Free Time (2019)

Singles from Ready
- 1. "Don't Tell Me" Released: 13 July 2017; 2. "Dazed & Confused" Released: 27 April 2018; 3. "Younger" Released: 8 June 2018; 4. "Not Thinkin' Bout You" Released: 2 November 2018; 5. "Say" Released: March 2019

Ready is the debut extended play by Australian singer-songwriter Ruel. It was released on 15 June 2018 through RCA Records.

== Reception ==
Rob Moran from Sydney Morning Herald said the EP has "jazzy chords" and "lilting songs of troubled young love".

The Music Desk at Broadway World said "The 6-track EP... includes previously released standouts, "Younger", "Don't Tell Me", and "Dazed & Confused" ... [and] features two previously unreleased songs; an infectious falsetto-laden alt-R&B influenced track called "Not Thinkin' Bout You" and "Say", a nostalgic, heartfelt power-ballad that exquisitely showcases the young artist's impressive vocal range and control."

Ones to Watch said "The EP as a whole is a testament to the bright future of pop music, as it is rich with an array of genres, contains a diverse range of relatable lyrical themes, and hosts a number of guaranteed ear worms."

Atwood Magazine said "Ruel is Ready: He's proved it five times over on his introductory effort, asserting his musical and lyrical talents through a majestic series of heavy anthems and soulful ballads that cut deep, hitting home every time."

== Track listing ==
Credits adapted from Tidal.

Digital download/streaming
No.	Title	Writer(s)	Producer(s)	Length
1.	"Intro"	Larry Darnell Griffin Jr.; Mark Landon; Ruel van Dijk; Sarah Aarons	M-Phazes	0:31
2.	"Younger"	JaVohn Jordan Griffin; Griffin Jr.; Landon; van Dijk; Aarons	M-Phazes; S1^{[a]}; VohnBeatz^{[a]}; Taka Perry^{[b]}	3:42
3.	"Dazed & Confused"	Landon; Peter James Harding; van Dijk; Sean Douglas	M-Phazes; Decap^{[b]}; Matt Noble^{[b]}	3:10
4.	"Not Thinkin' Bout You"	Griffin, Jr.; Landon; van Dijk; Samuel Elliot Roman; Tobias Jesso Jr.	M-Phazes; S1^{[a]}; Taka Perry^{[b]}	3:08
5.	"Say"	Alex Hope; Landon; van Dijk	M-Phazes; Alex Hope^{[b]}	3:47
6.	"Don't Tell Me"	Harding; Landon; van Dijk	M-Phazes	4:01
Total length:				18:03

Notes

- ^{^[a]} signifies a co-producer.
- ^{^[b]} signifies an miscellaneous producer.
- "Intro" features background vocals from Stella van Djik and Sylvie van Djik.
- "Younger" features background vocals from Hooked on Harmonx, Sarah Aarons, Thief and Jason McGee & The Choir.
- "Dazed & Confused" features background vocals from Phillipe-Marc Anquetil and Thief.
- "Not Thinkin' Bout You" features background vocals from Hooked on Harmonx and Phillipe-Marc Anquetil.
- "Say" features background vocals from Alex Hope, Angel Tairua, and Shhor.

== Personnel ==
Credits adapted from Tidal.

Musicians

- Sarah Aarons – background vocals (track 2)
- E-Session Strings – strings (track 5)
- Beau Golden – keyboards (tracks 2, 4, 5)
- Hooked on Harmonx – background vocals (tracks 2, 4)
- Alex Hope – background vocals (track 5), piano (track 5)
- Jason McGee and The Choir – choir (track 2)
- Sean Kantrowitz – guitar (track 3), synthesizer (track 3)
- Jake Meadows – harp (track 5)
- Taka Perry – piano (track 1)
- Shhor – background vocals (track 5)
- Angel Tairua – background vocals (track 5)
- Ruel Vincent van Djik – lead vocals (all tracks)
- Stella van Djik – background vocals (track 1)
- Sylvie van Djik – background vocals (track 1)
- Thief – background vocals (track 2)
- Daniel Walsh – guitar (tracks 2–4)

Production

- Phillipe-Marc Anquetil – recording engineer (tracks 2–6)
- William Binderup – assistant engineer (tracks 1, 2, 4)
- Spencer Cheyne – mixing engineer (track 5)
- Eric J. Dubowsky – mixing engineer (track 6)
- Symbolyc One – co-producer (tracks 2, 4)
- VohnBeatz – co-producer (track 2)
- Alex Hope – miscellaneous producer (track 5)
- Brennan Kennedy – assistant engineer (track 5)
- M-Phazes – producer (all tracks), recording engineer (tracks 1, 2)
- Erik Madrid – mixing engineer (tracks 1, 2, 4)
- Matt Noble – miscellaneous producer (track 3)
- One Above – recording engineer (track 3)
- Taka Perry – miscellaneous producer (tracks 2, 4)
- Decap – miscellaneous producer (track 3)
- Keith "Ten4" Sorrells – mixing engineer (track 3)

== Weekly charts ==
Chart (2018)	Peak position
Australia (ARIA)	76
Australian Artist (ARIA)	17
New Zealand Heatseekers (RIANZ)	3

== Certifications ==
Region	Certification	Certified units/sales
New Zealand (RMNZ)	Gold	7,500^{‡}
^{‡} Sales+streaming figures based on certification alone.

== Release history ==
Region	Date	Format(s)	Label	Catalogue
Australia	15 June 2018	Digital download / streaming	RCA Records, Sony Music	
