= Ramengvrl =

Indonesian rapper (born 1992)

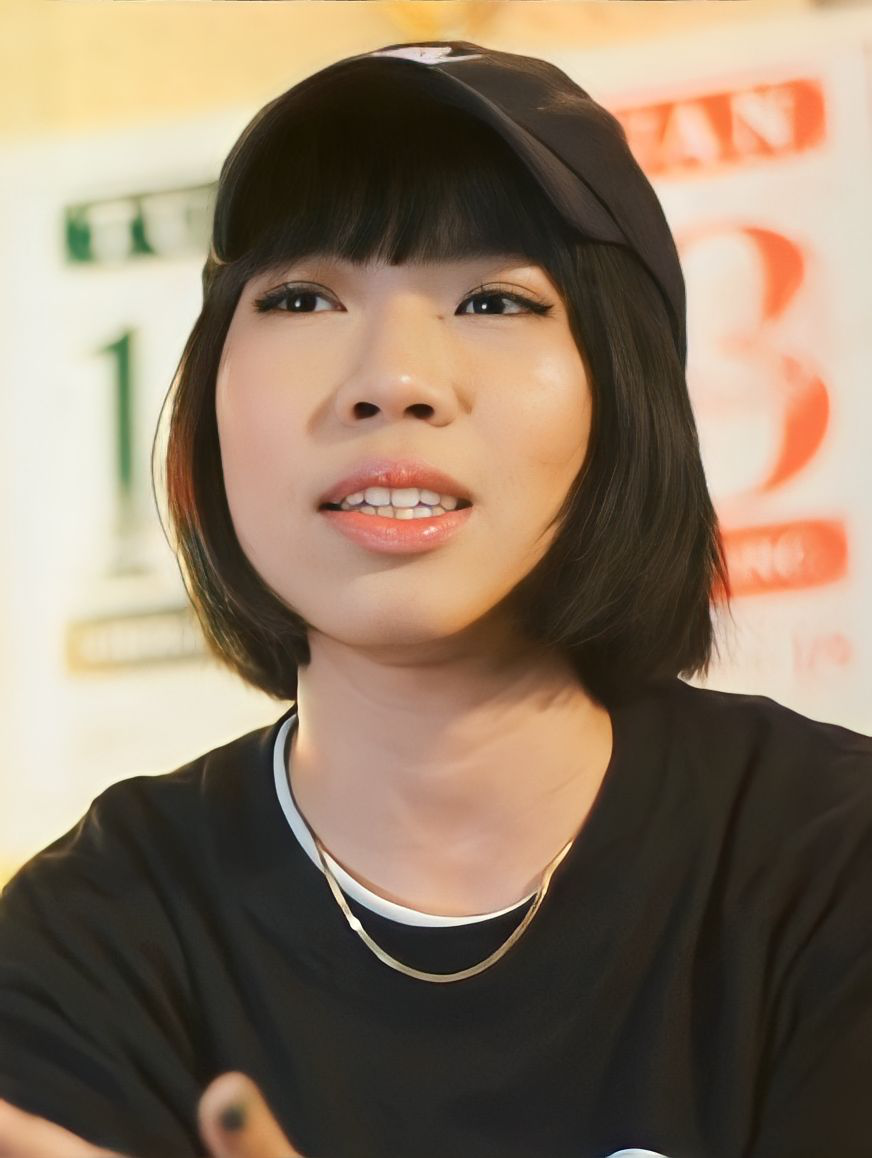
- Ramengvrl in 2019
- Born: Putri Estiani Soeharto; 20 April 1992 (age 34); Jakarta, Indonesia
- Occupation: Rapper
- Years active: 2016–present
- Musical career
- Genres: Hip hop
- Labels: Going Noodles; Underground Bizniz Club; Juni; Empire Distribution; Asiatic Records

Putri Estiani (born 20 April 1992), known professionally as Ramengvrl (pronounced Ramengirl), is an Indonesian rapper. She rose to prominence after releasing her debut single "I'm Da Man" in 2016. She has received five Anugerah Musik Indonesia awards from twelve nominations.

== Early life ==
Ramengvrl became interested in hip hop when she was in high school. She developed a hobby of writing in her blog and diary. In 2013, she felt stressed while working on her thesis and dealing with family problems. She then started creating music using the Audacity software. After graduating from University of Indonesia, she worked in an office for three years, before being offered a recording contract by Underground Bizniz Club.

== Career ==
Ramengvrl released her debut single "I'm Da Man" in December 2016. In November 2017, she was featured in Dipha Barus' single "Decide" along with A. Nayaka and Matter Mos. She signed a recording contract with Juni Records and released a single "Go! (I Can Be Your)", produced by Jarreau Vandal in December 2017. She received five nominations at the 2018 Anugerah Musik Indonesia, including Best New Artist. She then won the Best Rap/Hip-Hop Production Work for "Decide". In 2019, she won the Anugerah Musik Indonesia award for Best Rap/Hip-Hop Production Work for "CA$HMERE". In April 2019, she released her debut mixtape titled No Bethany, featuring lead single "Whats Ur Problem".

In 2020, she signed a recording contract with independent American record label Empire Distribution. Shortly after, she released a single, "Vaselina" featuring American rapper Euro. She released her first studio album, Can't Speak English in November 2020, featuring guest appearances by Euro, Ted Park, Pyra, Sihk, and Inayah.

In November 2021, she became the first artist to sign with the Asian hip hop branch of Warner Music, Asiatic Records. In 2023, she was featured on the soundtrack for the film Joy Ride with an original track "Juicy".

== Discography ==
=== Studio albums ===
Title	Details	Ref.
Can't Speak English	Released: 20 November 2020; Label: Juni, Empire; Format: Digital download, streaming	

=== Mixtapes ===
Title	Details	Ref.
No Bethany	Released: 26 April 2019; Label: Juni; Format: Cassette, digital download, streaming	

=== Singles ===
==== As lead artist ====
Title	Year	Album
"I'm da Man"	2016	Non-album singles
"Hyperballin" (with A. Nayaka)	2017	Non-album singles
"Decide" (with Dipha Barus, A. Nayaka and Matter Mos)	2017	Non-album singles
"Go! (I Can Be Your)"	2017	Non-album singles
"Ca$hmere"	2018	Non-album singles
"Whachu Mean"	2018	Non-album singles
"I Am Me"	2018	Non-album singles
"Whats Ur Problem"	2019	No Bethany
"Vaselina" (featuring Euro)	2020	Can't Speak English
"Look At Me Now" (with Ted Park)	2020	Can't Speak English
"The Emo Song" (featuring Sihk)	2020	Can't Speak English
"Go Get That B" (with Inayah)	2020	Can't Speak English
"Foreign" (with Pyra)	2020	Can't Speak English
"Don't Touch Me" (with Marion Jola and Danilla)	2021	Non-album singles
"I'm Ugly"	2021	Non-album singles
"Ain't No MF" (featuring pH-1)	2021	Non-album singles
"Fake Friends"	2021	Non-album singles
"Who Dis?"	2022	Non-album singles
"Facts" (with asiatic.wav)	2022	Non-album singles
"Onto the Next"	2022	Non-album singles
"Ming Ling" (featuring Yung Raja)	2022	Non-album singles
"Fashion"	2022	Non-album singles
"Juicy"	2023	Non-album singles
"Bossy" (with Cinta Laura)	2023	Non-album singles
"Indo ME" (with Basboi)	2023	Non-album singles
"Bombae" (with Awich)	2024	Non-album singles
"Want Me Back" (with CLAUDIA and Taka Perry)	2024	Non-album singles
"Be My Baby" (with Egnever)	2025	Non-album singles

==== As featured artist ====
Title	Year	Album
"Alpha Girl" (JRSCK featuring Ramengvrl)	2017	Non-album singles
"I Dont Wanna Talk to You" (Orang Malaya featuring Ramengvrl)	2017	Non-album singles
"Riphunter" (.Feast featuring Mardial, Bam Mastro & Ramengvrl)	2017	Multiverses
"Idols, Pt. 2" (Bam Mastro featuring Ramengvrl)	2017	I Bleach My Skin
"Digital Love" (Mardial featuring Ramengvrl)	2017	Mardial & Friends
"Us Vs." (Rock N Roll Mafia and Elephant Kind featuring Ramengvrl)	2018	Urban GiGs Unreleased Project, Vol. 1
"Take Me Back" (Afgan featuring Ramengvrl)	2018	Dekade
"Copycat" (Rayi Putra & Dmust Akira featuring Ramengvrl)	2018	Non-album singles
"Ain't Gonna Give Up" (RAN featuring Ramengvrl)	2019	Non-album singles
"Mmm Bye" (RRILEY featuring Ramengvrl)	2020	Alpha
"Fly" (Radhini featuring Ramengvrl)	2020	Non-album single
"Bassgod" (Yellow Claw, Juyen Sebulba & Sihk featuring Ramengvrl)	2021	The Holy Bassgod
"Yellow Fever" (Pyra featuring Ramengvrl & Yayoi Daimon)	2021	fkn bad Pt.1
"Joyful Interlude" (Matter Mos featuring Ramengvrl & Romantic Echoes)	2022	Pronoia 2.0
"Modern Pagan" (Matter Mos featuring Ramengvrl & Faye Risakotta)	2022	Pronoia 2.0
"Gal Is Mind (Remix)" (Softboiledegg featuring Ramengvrl & Yayoi Daimon)	2023	Non-album single
"No Tinder" (€URO TRA$H and Yellow Claw featuring Ramengvrl)	2023	Non-album single
"Xtra McNasty" (Jay Park featuring Jessi, Awich, Milli, Ramengvrl, Lil Cherry, Mirani, Maliibu Miitch & CAMO)	2024	Non-album single
"Believe" (Taka Perry, Leon Fanourakis, and YNG Martyr featuring Ramengvrl and Sokodomo)	2024	Non-album single
