= I'm Sorry (Joyner Lucas song) =

2016 single by Joyner Lucas

Single by Joyner Lucas

from the album 508-507-2209
- Released: August 5, 2016
- Genre: Conscious hip hop
- Length: 5:49
- Label: Atlantic
- Songwriter(s): Gary Lucas Jr.; David Kraft/The Cratez; Tim Wilke/The Cratez
- Producer(s): The Cratez

Joyner Lucas singles chronology
"Tec In The Church" (2016)	"I'm Sorry" (2016)	"Say Hello to Adele" (2016)

Music video
- "I'm Sorry" on YouTube

"I'm Sorry" is a song by American rapper Joyner Lucas, released on August 5, 2016 as the lead single from his fourth mixtape 508-507-2209 (2017). Produced by The Cratez, the song deals with the effects of suicide.

== Background ==
In an interview with The Fader in August 2016, Joyner Lucas talked about his motivation for composing the song:

One of my stepfather's friends committed suicide a couple months ago. But even before that happened, a lot of fans had reached out to me telling me that they were dealing with depression. I didn't know what to say to them, because I'd never dealt with it. My little brother was suicidal at one point, and I had conversations with him about it. I knew I wanted to make the record; I always wanted to make a record like this. I just didn't know how to approach it. How do you really tell somebody, or try to help somebody through something like this? How do you make songs about something like this without coming across as cheesy in a way? How do you make a record about something that people already know? I'm thinking about all the things that they must've already heard, and I told myself I have to come across differently. I have to relate to them some way; I have to give them that platform on which they can also understand, from the outside looking in, how other people may feel when they're gone. So I wanted to touch on the issue in a different way, to kind of make the listener understand completely where I was coming from. I wanted to make it more personal.

Regarding the song, Lucas also told Billboard, "I never thought I was ever going to be able to top what I did with 'Ross Capicchioni.' So when I wrote 'I'm Sorry,' that was really me trying to top what I did, and I think I did that."

== Content ==
Like a number of his songs, "I'm Sorry" finds Joyner Lucas rapping from two opposing points of view. The first verse is told from the perspective of a person who has committed suicide and addresses their anguish and mental health struggles. The second verse explores the consequences impacting their loved ones, with Lucas taking on the role of a friend who feels upset, angry and helpless about the situation and not having been able to prevent it.

== Music video ==
The music video was filmed in July 2016 at Faith Tabernacle Church in Worcester, Massachusetts, where Joyner's uncle Walter Lucas is the spiritual leader. For the shoot, Joyner Lucas bought a coffin which he donated to the family of murder victim Lee A. Daniels. British poet Suli Breaks portrays the suicide victim in the video, having flown from London to Worcester for the filming, and stages a series of suicide methods. Lucas plays the victim's friend, rapping as Breaks' character lies in a coffin. The video was released on August 12, 2016.

== Controversy ==
In an interview with Complex in December 2017, Joyner Lucas accused fellow rapper Logic, whom he was feuding with at the time, of copying his idea of suicide prevention in the song "1-800-273-8255". Lucas pointed out an additional similarity in which the titles of his mixtape 508-507-2209 and Logic's song were both phone numbers.
