= Not Thinkin' Bout You =

- The single cover uses the full spelling of "thinking"

Single by Ruel

from the EP Ready
- Released: 2 November 2018
- Length: 3:08
- Label: RCA; Sony Music Australia
- Songwriters: Larry Darnell Griffin Jr.; Mark Landon; Ruel van Djik; Samuel Elliot Roman; Tobias Jesso Jr.
- Producers: M-Phazes; S1; Taka Perry

Ruel singles chronology
"Younger" (2018)	"Not Thinkin' Bout You" (2018)	"Say" (2019)

Music video
- "Not Thinkin' Bout You" on YouTube

"Not Thinkin' Bout You" is a song recorded by Australian singer-songwriter Ruel, released on 2 November 2018, as the fourth single from Ruel's debut extended play, Ready (2018).

Written by Ruel alongside Symbolyc One, M-Phazes, Romans and Tobias Jesso Jr., the track was primarily produced by M-Phazes, with additional production from Symbolyc One and Taka Perry.

Two additional versions of "Not Thinkin' Bout You" were later released—a remix featuring American rapper and singer GoldLink, and an acoustic version featuring Australian rapper and record producer Billy Davis.

== Background ==
Ruel says the song is about getting over a breakup and denial; saying you're not thinking about someone, when you obviously are.

== Music video ==
The music video for "Not Thinkin' Bout You" was directed by Grey Ghost and was released on 30 October 2018. The clip was filmed whilst on tour between the locations of Seoul, Tokyo and Los Angeles and shows Ruel amongst fans, in photoshoots and exploring the streets.

== Track listings ==
Radio

1. "Not Thinkin' Bout You" – 3:08

Digital download – GoldLink remix

1. "Not Thinkin' Bout You" (GoldLink remix) – 3:50

Digital download – acoustic version

1. "Not Thinkin' Bout You" (acoustic version; featuring Billy Davis) – 4:54

== Personnel ==
Adapted from Spotify.

=== Performers ===
- Beau Golden – keyboards
- Daniel Walsh – guitar
- Hooked on Harmonx – background vocals
- Phillipe-Marc Anquetil – background vocals

=== Writing and arrangement ===
- Ruel Vincent Van Dijk – composer, lyricist
- Mark Landon – composer, lyricist
- Samuel Elliot Roman – composer, lyricist
- Tobias Jesso Jr. – composer, lyricist
- Larry Darnell Griffin Jr. – composer, lyricist

=== Production and engineering ===
- Phillipe-Marc Anquetil – recording engineer
- M-Phazes – producer
- S1 – co-producer
- Taka Perry – additional studio producer
- Eric Madrid – mixing engineer
- William Binderup – assistant engineer

== Certifications ==
Region	Certification	Certified units/sales
Australia (ARIA)	Gold	35,000^{‡}
New Zealand (RMNZ)	Gold	15,000^{‡}
^{‡} Sales+streaming figures based on certification alone.

== Release history ==
Release dates and formats for "Not Thinkin' Bout You"
Region	Date	Format	Version	Label	Ref.
Australia	2 November 2018	Contemporary hit radio	EP version	RCA; Sony Music Australia	
Worldwide	9 November 2018	Digital download; streaming	GoldLink remix	RCA; Sony Music Australia	
Worldwide	1 February 2019	Digital download; streaming	Acoustic (featuring Billy Davis)	RCA; Sony Music Australia	
