= 508-507-2209 =

Mixtape by Joyner Lucas
- Released: June 16, 2017
- Recorded: 2015–2017
- Genre: Hip hop
- Length: 82:52
- Label: Atlantic
- Producers: Boi-1da (exec.); Allen Ritter; Chill Shump; Dawaun Parker; Decap; Frank Dukes; Joyner Lucas; Lord Quest; Nineteen85; Statik Selektah; The Cratez

Joyner Lucas chronology
Along Came Joyner (2015)	508-507-2209 (2017)	ADHD (2020)

Singles from 508-507-2209
- 1. "I'm Sorry" Released: August 5, 2016; 2. "Ultrasound" Released: March 31, 2017; 3. "Just Like You" Released: May 19, 2017; 4. "Winter Blues" Released: June 2, 2017

Professional ratings
Review scores
Source	Rating
Exclaim!	8/10
XXL	4/5

508-507-2209 is the fourth mixtape by American rapper Joyner Lucas. It was released on June 16, 2017, by Atlantic Records, making this his commercial debut. It was preceded by four singles: "I'm Sorry", "Ultrasound", "Just Like You" and "Winter Blues". The mixtape features appearances from Mystikal, Snoh Aalegra and Stefflon Don.

== Background ==
The title is presumably taken from Lucas' phone number. The mixtape consists of sixteen songs. In an interview with HotNewHipHop about how the project came about, Joyner said:

"This project took two years in the making, there's a lot of records that I scrapped, start over, scrapped, start over. There's records that I've made from the very beginning two years ago that I still kept on the project now. So there's a lot of old mixed with new but it's all cohesive".

== Singles ==
"I'm Sorry" was released as the lead single from the mixtape on August 5, 2016. The music video was released on August 12, 2016, and has received over 78 million views since its release. The song was produced by The Cratez.

"Ultrasound" was released as the second single on March 31, 2017, along with an accompanied music video. The music video has received over 11 million views since its release. The song was produced by Decap.

"Just Like You" was released as the third single on May 19, 2017, along with an accompanied music video. The music video has received over 25 million views since its release. The song was produced by Boi-1da and Dawaun Parker.

"Winter Blues" was released as the fourth single on June 2, 2017. The music video was released on October 23, 2017, and has received over 42 million views since its release. The song was produced by The Cratez.

== Commercial performance ==
508-507-2209 debuted at number seven on the US Heatseekers Albums chart for the chart dated July 8, 2017.

== Track listing ==
Credits were adapted from Tidal.

No.	Title	Writer(s)	Producer(s)	Length
1.	"Ultrasound"	Gary Lucas; Nicholas Piantedosi	Decap	2:54
2.	"Lovely"	Lucas; Brian Eisner; Andrea Blanchard	Nox Beatz	6:19
3.	"FYM" (featuring Mystikal)	Lucas; Michael Tyler; Matthew Samuels; Albert Johnson	Boi-1da	4:48
4.	"Keep It 100"	Lucas; Eisner; Roy Studmire; Scotty Coleman	Coleman	6:57
5.	"Winter Blues"	Lucas; David Kraft; Tim Wilke	The Cratez	4:35
6.	"Just Like You"	Lucas; Samuels; Eisner	Boi-1da; Dawaun Parker^{[b]}	4:16
7.	"Just Because"	Lucas; Marquan Shumpert; André Benjamin; Antwan Patton; Patrick Brown; Raymon Murray; Rico Wade	Chill Shump; Nox Beatz^{[a]}	6:00
8.	"Lullaby"	Lucas; Samuels; Dawaun Parker; Adam Feeney	Boi-1da; Frank Dukes; Dawaun Parker^{[b]}	4:31
9.	"Way to Go" (featuring Snoh Aalegra)	Lucas; Eisner; Patrick Baril; Ernie Johnson; Edgar Campbell	Statik Selektah; Nox Beatz^{[a]}	5:42
10.	"Look What You Made Me Do" (featuring Stefflon Don)	Lucas; Jeffrey Nuamah; Stephanie Allen	Lord Quest	4:13
11.	"We Gon Be Alright"	Lucas; Kraft; Wilke	The Cratez	4:24
12.	"Forever"	Lucas; Eisner; Samuels; Allen Ritter; Derek Fimbel	Boi-1da; Ritter; Lucas	5:43
13.	"I Need More"	Lucas; Samuels; Paul Jefferies	Boi-1da; Nineteen85	4:52
14.	"Literally"	Lucas; Samuels; Kraft; Wilke	Boi-1da; Nox Beatz	5:34
15.	"I'm Sorry"	Lucas; Kraft; Wilke	The Cratez	5:49
16.	"One Lonely Night"	Lucas; Piantedosi	Decap; Nox Beatz^{[b]}	6:15
Total length:				82:52

Notes

- ^{^{^[a]}} signifies a co-producer
- ^{^{^b]}} signifies an additional producer
- "Ultrasound" features additional vocals from Shara Sood
- "Lovely" and "I'm Sorry" features additional vocals from Andrea Blanchard
- "Lullaby" features additional vocals from Boi-1da and Rosette Luve
- "One Lonely Night" features additional vocals from Ivy Rivera
- "FYM" was originally called "James Brown" but had to be re-titled to "FYM" for unknown reasons.

Sample credits

- "Just Because" contains samples from "Jazzy Belle", written by André Benjamin, Antwan Patton, Patrick Brown, Raymon Murray and Rico Wade, as performed by OutKast
- "Way to Go" contains samples from "Falling Tears (Indian Drums)", written by Ernie Johnson and Edgar Campbell, as performed by Eddie & Ernie

== Personnel ==
Credits adapted from Tidal.

Performers

- Joyner Lucas – primary artist
- Mystikal – featured artist (track 3)
- Snoh Aalegra – featured artist (track 9)
- Stefflon Don – featured artist (track 10)

Technical

- Nox Beatz – recording engineer (tracks 1, 2, 5–9, 11, 13–16), mixing engineer (tracks 1, 2, 5–9, 11, 13–16)

Instruments

- Alan Manos – horn (track 5)
- Dawaun Parker – organ (track 6)
- Nox Beatz – guitar (track 7), additional guitar (track 15)
- Andwele Coore – piano (track 16)

Production

- Decap – producer (tracks 1, 16)
- Nox Beatz – producer (tracks 2, 4, 14), co-producer (tracks 7, 9), additional producer (track 16)
- Boi-1da – producer (tracks 3, 6, 8, 12–14)
- The Cratez – producer (tracks 5, 11, 15)
- Chill Shump – producer (track 7)
- Frank Dukes – producer (track 8)
- Dawaun Parker – producer (track 8)
- Statik Selektah – producer (track 9)
- Lord Quest – producer (track 10)
- Allen Ritter – producer (track 12)
- Joyner Lucas – producer (track 12)
- Nineteen85 – producer (track 13)

== Charts ==
Chart (2017)	Peak position
US Heatseekers Albums (Billboard)	7
