= SIS (Soft Is Strong) =

- Digital cover

EP by Katseye
- Released: August 16, 2024
- Genres: Pop; dance-pop; electronic
- Length: 11:44
- Labels: Hybe UMG; Geffen
- Producers: Ryan Tedder; Tyler Spry; Grant Boutin; 13; Blake Slatkin; Cashmere Cat; Omer Fedi; Taka Perry; "Hitman" Bang; Slow Rabbit; Federico Vindver; Digital Farm Animals; Jason Gill; Oskar Widén

Katseye chronology
SIS (Soft Is Strong) (2024)	Beautiful Chaos (2025)

Singles from SIS (Soft Is Strong)
- 1. "Debut" Released: June 28, 2024; 2. "Touch" Released: July 26, 2024

SIS (Soft Is Strong) is the debut extended play (EP) by girl group Katseye. It was released by Hybe UMG and Geffen Records on August 16, 2024. The EP was promoted by the singles "Debut" in June and "Touch" in July, and reached the top ten in Croatia and South Korea.

== Background ==
The group (Katseye) was formed through the reality show, Dream Academy, hosted as a joint venture by Hybe and Geffen Records, to create a girl group that will be promoted primarily in the United States. The show ended in November 2023. On June 14, 2024, Hybe and Geffen made plans to release Katseye's first extended play (EP) in August later that same year, preceded by the release of two singles included in the album on June 28 and in July of that same year. On the same day of the release of "Debut", the name of the EP, titled SIS (Soft Is Strong), was unveiled, along with its release date of August 16. Pre-orders for the album began on July 10. The album's track listing was unveiled on August 2.

On August 9 and 10, two series of concept photos, titled "Strong", and "Soft" respectively, were released. In the "Strong" series, the members of Katseye are dressed as their representative porcelain dolls that appear on the cover art of their singles "Debut" and "Touch", and also mimicking the stance of the dolls against a white background. In the "Soft" series, the members are placed in front of a backdrop resembling an antique shop. A group of photos in the "Soft" series feature the members wearing costumes related to their assigned Dream Charm symbols. On August 14, the album's highlight medley was released. SIS (Soft Is Strong) was released globally on August 16.

== Singles ==
The first single, called "Debut", was announced on June 25, 2024, and was released four days later.

The second single, called "Touch", was announced on July 23, and was released on July 26.

== Critical reception ==
Professional ratings
Review scores
Source	Rating
AllMusic	2.5/5 stars
NME	4/5 stars

Upon its release, SIS (Soft Is Strong) received generally positive reviews. NME's Mika Chen gave the album four out of five stars, describing it as "a surprisingly cohesive release that largely captures [Katseye's] enormous potential", but criticizes the short length of the tracks in the album, which resulted in "a song [that] ends a little bit too early or the feeling that it was just one final chorus away from perfection". Billboard Philippines' Gabriel Saulog described the album as "an excellent (and empowering) display of the varying sounds within the landscape of pop music", dubbing it as reminiscent of the 2000s and 2010s-style pop music by artists such as Little Mix and Britney Spears, with a blend of "modern K-pop elements".

== Track listing ==
SIS (Soft Is Strong) track listing
No.	Title	Writer(s)	Producer(s)	Length
1.	"Debut"	Ryan Tedder; Tyler Spry; Grant Boutin; Omer Fedi	Tedder; Spry; Boutin	2:03
2.	"Touch"	Blake Slatkin; Caroline Ailin; Jessica Porfiri; Magnus Høiberg; Fedi; Taka Perry	Slatkin; Cashmere Cat; Fedi; Perry	2:09
3.	"My Way"	"Hitman" Bang; Slow Rabbit; Federico Vindver; Amanda "Kiddo A.I." Ibanez; Ali Tamposi; John Byron	"Hitman" Bang; Slow Rabbit; Vindver	2:34
4.	"I'm Pretty"	Kiddo A.I.; Nicholas Gale; Sam Roman; Richard Boardman	Digital Farm Animals	2:22
5.	"Tonight I Might"	Jason Gill; Justin Tranter; Caroline Pennell	Gill; Oskar Widén; 13	2:36
Total length:				11:44

== Charts ==
Chart performance for SIS (Soft Is Strong)
Chart (2024–2026)	Peak position
Belgian Albums (Ultratop Flanders)	16
Belgian Albums (Ultratop Wallonia)	71
Croatian International Albums (HDU)	2
French Albums (SNEP)	42
Hungarian Physical Albums (MAHASZ)	19
Portuguese Albums (AFP)	176
Scottish Albums (Official Charts)	58
South Korean Albums (Circle)	8
Swedish Physical Albums (Sverigetopplistan)	12
Swiss Albums (Schweizer Hitparade)	69
UK Albums Sales (Official Charts)	45
US Billboard 200	98

== Certifications ==
Certifications for SIS (Soft Is Strong)
Region	Certification	Certified units/sales
New Zealand (RMNZ)	Gold	7,500^{‡}
^{‡} Sales+streaming figures based on certification alone.

== Release history ==
Release history for SIS (Soft Is Strong)
Region	Date	Format	Label	Ref(s).
South Korea	August 16, 2024	CD	Hybe UMG; YG Plus	
Japan	August 16, 2024	CD; LP	Universal Japan	
United States	August 16, 2024	CD; LP	Hybe UMG; Geffen	
Various	August 16, 2024	Digital download; streaming	Hybe UMG; Geffen	
