= Dazed & Confused (Ruel song) =

Single by Ruel

from the album Ready
- Released: 27 April 2018
- Length: 3:09
- Label: RCA, Sony Music Australia
- Songwriters: Ruel van Dijk; Peter Harding; Mark London; Sean Douglas
- Producer: M-Phazes

Ruel singles chronology
"Human" (2017)	"Dazed & Confused" (2018)	"Younger" (2018)

Music video
- "Dazed & Confused" on YouTube

"Dazed & Confused" is a song recorded by Australian singer-songwriter Ruel and produced by M-Phazes. The song was released on 27 October 2018 as the second single from Ruel's debut extended play, Ready (2018).

At the ARIA Music Awards of 2018, "Dazed & Confused" won the ARIA Award for Breakthrough Artist.

== Background ==
Upon release, Ruel said: "I wrote "Dazed & Confused" in the front room of my Airbnb in Los Angeles last November and the song has come so far with the help of my good friend and collaborator M-Phazes, who also produced my upcoming EP. The song started with some simple, light-hearted piano chords and has since become the toughest track on the EP."

== Music video ==
The music video was directed by Grey Ghost and released on 30 May 2018.

== Reception ==
Broadway World draw comparisons to Justin Bieber's Purpose "most mature and earworm-ready hits", adding that the song "stands apart by drawing on blues and R&B for added depth."

== Track listing ==
One-track single

1. "Dazed & Confused" – 3:09

One-track single

1. "Dazed & Confused" (Acoustic Version featuring Ezinma) – 3:57

RSD2021 Limited Edition 7" Transparent Green Vinyl (150 copies)

1. "Dazed & Confused" - 3:09
2. "Dazed & Confused" (Instrumental Version) - 3:09

== Charts ==
Chart (2018)	Peak position
Australia (ARIA)	53
Australian Artists (ARIA)	10

== Certifications ==
Region	Certification	Certified units/sales
Australia (ARIA)	2× Platinum	140,000^{‡}
Brazil (Pro-Música Brasil)	Gold	20,000^{‡}
New Zealand (RMNZ)	Platinum	30,000^{‡}
United States (RIAA)	Gold	500,000^{‡}
^{‡} Sales+streaming figures based on certification alone.

== Release history ==
Country	Date	Format	Label	Version
Australia	27 April 2018	Digital download, streaming	RCA, Sony Music Australia	Original version
Australia	12 October 2018	Digital download, streaming	RCA, Sony Music Australia	Acoustic version
Australia	April 2021	7" single	Sony Music Australia	Original & instrumental
