= Say (Ruel song) =

Single by Ruel

from the EP Ready
- Released: March 2019
- Length: 3:47
- Label: RCA/Sony Music Australia
- Songwriter(s): Alex Hope; Mark Landon; Ruel van Djik

Ruel singles chronology
"Not Thinkin' Bout You" (2018)	"Say" (2019)	"Painkiller" (2019)

Music video
- "Say" (acoustic) on YouTube

"Say" is a song recorded by Australian singer-songwriter Ruel. The song was released in March 2019 as the fifth and final single from Ruel's debut extended play, Ready. An acoustic version, featuring Jake Meadows was released on 15 March 2019.

In an interview about the EP, Ruel said "The one that I always get really emotional to, is probably 'Say'. Every time I do that live people get their phone-lights out, and I see the crowd reacting and then I start reacting, and it just makes a special moment. That song is very fun to sing and to emote to."

The song was certified gold in Australia in November 2021.

== Reception ==
In a review of the EP, Broadway World called the song "a nostalgic, heartfelt power-ballad that exquisitely showcases the young artist's impressive vocal range and control."

== Track listing ==
Radio

1. "Say" – 3:47

Digital download – Acoustic version

1. "Say" (featuring Jake Meadows) - Acoustic Version – 3:58

== Certifications ==
Region	Certification	Certified units/sales
Australia (ARIA)	Gold	35,000^{‡}
^{‡} Sales+streaming figures based on certification alone.
