= A.Girl =

Australian rapper/musician

A.GIRL
- Born: Hinenuiterangi Tairua; 06/01/2000; Westmead Hospital, Sydney, Australia
- Origin: Sydney, Australia
- Genre: Australian hip hop
- Instruments: Vocals
- Label: Volkanik
- Website: http://www.agirlartist.com

Hinenuiterangi Tairua, known by her stage name A.Girl, is an Australian musician, singer, songwriter and rapper from Sydney. She won Next Big Thing at the 2019 FBi Awards in Sydney. She performed on triple j's Like a Version and Bars of Steel. She won the Triple J Unearthed competition to play at Listen Out in 2019.

Current host at triple j for the hip hop show

Hinenuiterangi performed on X Factor Australia and Australia's Got Talent as part of the groups Unique and Trill.

== Personal life ==
Hinenuiterangi was born in Sydney to a Māori family from New Zealand. Her first experience with music was performing in a reggae band called ONE LOVE composed of her family members Paulette Tairua and REWETI PENE playing in venues in her home city.

== Discography ==
=== Singles ===
- "2142" (2019)
- "Play" (2019)
- "All Over You" (2020)
- "Lola" (2020)
- "Luv Drunk" (2021)
- "Vision" (2021)
- "We Them Boyz" (featuring Jaecy) (2021)

=== As featured artist ===
- B Wise – "Nxt 2 U" (2019)
- Oh Boy – "I Never Cried So Much in My Whole Life" (2020)
- Kinder – "Come Along" (2020)
- True Vibenation – "More Than You'll Ever Know" (2021)
- Lil Spacely – "Husky" (2021)
