= Decap (producer) =

American record producer from New Hampshire

- Also known as: DecapMusic
- Born: Nicholas John Piantedosi; November 8, 1984 (age 41); Waltham, Massachusetts, U.S.
- Origin: Nashua, New Hampshire, U.S.
- Genres: Electronic, Hip hop, Pop, trap music,
- Occupations: Record producer; songwriter; music programmer
- Years active: 2000–present
- Label: Future Knock
- Website: www.decapmusic.com

Nicholas Piantedosi (born November 8, 1984), professionally known as Decap, is an American record producer from Nashua, New Hampshire, United States. Decap has worked with and produced for artists such as Talib Kweli, Joyner Lucas, Hit-Boy, Locksmith, Zion I, Spose, Watsky, Smoke DZA, J-Essential and many more. In 2013, Decap released his full length debut instrumental album, Omni Love.

== Early life ==
Nicholas Piantedosi was born in Waltham, Massachusetts and relocated to Nashua, New Hampshire as a young child. As early as Junior High School, Decap was fascinated with music and began to study the art of producing. In 1995, after purchasing Snoop Dogg “Doggystyle” album, Decap was fully committed to making his presence felt in hip-hop. Decap began to collect and study the genre and drew inspiration from hip-hop pioneers such as J Dilla, Dj Premier, Pete Rock, and A Tribe Called Quest. Decap began rapping and started a 9 member rap group named, “Young Tribe.” Inspired by marginal success and wanting original material for Young Tribe, Decap bought his first drum machine and began to record beats and instrumentals.

== Music career ==
In 2007, Decap moved to New York City, New York to pursue his career in music. In January 2013, Decap relocated to San Francisco, California and began work on his solo album, “Omni Love”. Decap produced and mixed several tracks on the Talib Kweli album, “Gravitas”. In June 2015, Decap released the single, “Feeling”, which reached 550,000 streams on Spotify and led to a collaborative performance video with Ableton. Also in 2015, Decap produced several tracks on the Spose album, “Why Am I So Happy” which peaked at number 1 on Billboard charts.

In July 2016, Decap produced a non-album single alongside Teeko (producer) THRPY (producer) and AzizTheShake (rapper). The song, titled "Hot Box", charted at #6 on Billboard, and #6 on Spotify USA Viral 50 Charts. Also In 2016, Decap founded the label/collective "Future Knock". Beyond a label, Decap considers "Future Knock" a new subgenre with its own signature sound. Decap also curates a bi-weekly “Future Knock” podcast promoting up-and-coming artist and producers. Decap released his Drums That Knock downloadable sound kit series (volumes 1-10) for electronic producers, which received 180,000 downloads and charted at #1 on Splice for the month of December 2016. In 2017, Decap produced ‘The Calling” and “Sanity” off of Locksmith album, “Olive Branch” and produced the first single, “Ultrasound” off of the Joyner Lucas album, “(508) 507-2209”. In April 2017, Decap produced the single “In The Bay” by Capitol Fr artist Ted Park.

== Discography ==
=== Studio albums ===
Title	Album details
Omni Love	Released: 2013; Label: Future Knock; Formats: CD, digital download
Qi (with Brady Watt)	Released: 2014; Label: Future Knock; Formats: CD, digital download
Excess Amount (with Teeko)	Released: 2016; Label: Future Knock; Formats: CD, digital download

=== Singles ===
Title	Year	Album
"Feeling" (featuring Chris Keys and Devaun Bantu)	2015	Non-album single
"Metamorphosis" (featuring Melissa Piantedosi)	2016	Non-album single
"Gramz" (featuring Hit-Boy and Jedi Jordan)	2016	Non-album single
"Knock"	2016	Non-album single
"Hot Box" (Aziz the Shake featuring Decap, Teeko, THRPY)	2016	Non-album single
"Spazzn" (featuring Gyrefunk)	2017	Non-album single

== Production discography ==
=== Singles produced ===
List of singles as a record producer, with selected chart positions and certifications, showing year released, performing artists and album name
Title	Year	Peak chart positions							Certifications	Album
Title	Year	US	US R&B	US Rap	AUS	CAN	GER	UK	Certifications	Album
"Wrong Ones" (D. One featuring Royce da 5’9")	2004	—	—	—	—	—	—	—		Non-album single
"Alright" (Ro James)	2012	—	—	—	—	—	—	—		Non-album single
"State of Grace" (Talib Kweli featuring Abby Dobson)	2012	13	—	13	—	—	—	—		"Gravitas"
"Good Times" (SJB featuring Bizzy Bone)	2013	—	—	—	—	—	—	—		Non-album single
"Minds of the Future" (Brady Watt featuring Smoke DZA)	2015	—	—	—	—	—	—	—		"Lifetronics"
"Nobody" (Spose featuring Watsky)	2015	1	—	52	—	—	—	—		"Why Am I So Happy?"
"Feels Like Magic" (Ryan Caraveo)	2016	—	—	—	—	—	—	—		"Maybe They Were Wrong"
"Wake Up" (Zion I)	2016	—	—	—	—	—	—	—		"Labyrinth"
"On" (J-Essential)	2017	—	—	—	—	—	—	—		Non-album single
"Ultrasound" (Joyner Lucas)	2017	—	—	—	—	—	—	—		"(508) 507-2209"
"Sanity" (Locksmith)	2017	—	—	—	—	—	—	—		"Olive Branch"
"In The Bay" (Ted Park)	2017	—	—	—	—	—	—	—		Non-album single
"—" denotes a recording that did not chart or was not released in that territory.
