= Younger (Ruel song) =

Single by Ruel

from the album Ready
- Released: 8 June 2018
- Genre: Pop
- Length: 3:42
- Label: RCA/Sony Music Australia
- Songwriters: Ruel, Sarah Aarons, Mayra Figueredo
- Producer: M-Phazes

Ruel singles chronology
"Dazed & Confused" (2018)	"Younger" (2018)	"Not Thinkin' Bout You" (2018)

Music video
- "Younger" on YouTube

"Younger" is a song recorded by Australian singer-songwriter Ruel and produced by M-Phazes. The song was released on 8 June 2018 as the third single from Ruel's debut extended play, Ready (2018). In October 2018, the song was certified gold in Australia; his first certification, and platinum in March 2019.

Upon release, Ruel said “I wrote "Younger" at my AirBNB in Los Angeles with my mate Sarah Aarons. We were talking about how friends part ways over time because of different interests or family life and I really liked that concept for a song. I definitely relate to this story personally and I feel like most people have gone through this kind of scenario too.”

== Music video ==
The music video for "Younger" was released on 2 August 2018 and is a short film directed by visual artist and three-time collaborator Grey Ghost. It depicts a friendship on the rocks that takes a turn for the worse after a fateful physical altercation. Ruel told Billboard. “The storyline in the "Younger" video isn't a direct reinterpretation of the lyrics—so instead of it being about you and your mate choosing different paths over time, it's about choosing your own path.”

== Track listing ==
One-track single

1. "Younger" – 3:42

== Charts ==
=== Weekly charts ===
Chart (2018)	Peak position
Australia (ARIA)	76
Australian Artists (ARIA)	9

=== Year-end charts ===
Chart (2018)	Position
Australian Artist (ARIA)	37
Chart (2019)	Position
Australian Artist (ARIA)	40

== Certifications ==
Region	Certification	Certified units/sales
Australia (ARIA)	2× Platinum	140,000^{‡}
New Zealand (RMNZ)	Platinum	30,000^{‡}
^{‡} Sales+streaming figures based on certification alone.

== Release history ==
Country	Date	Format	Label
Australia	8 June 2018	Digital download, streaming	RCA, Sony Music Australia
Australia	28 August 2018	radio	RCA, Sony Music Australia
