= Debut (song) =

2024 single by Katseye

Single by Katseye

from the EP SIS (Soft Is Strong)
- Released: June 28, 2024
- Genre: Pop
- Length: 2:03
- Label: Hybe UMG; Geffen
- Composers: Ryan Tedder; Tyler Spry; Grant Boutin; Omer Fedi
- Lyricists: Ryan Tedder; Tyler Spry; Grant Boutin; Omer Fedi
- Producers: Ryan Tedder; Tyler Spry; Grant Boutin

Katseye singles chronology
| "Debut" (2024) | "Touch" (2024) |

Music video
- "Debut" on YouTube

"Debut" is the debut single by girl group Katseye. It was released on June 28, 2024, through Hybe UMG and Geffen Records, as the lead single from their debut extended play SIS (Soft Is Strong) (2024).

== Background and release ==
After the formation of Katseye in Dream Academy by Hybe and Geffen Records, Hybe and Geffen announced plans to release Katseye's first EP in August later that year. The first single, "Debut", was announced on June 25, and was released three days later.

== Critical reception ==
NME's Mika Chen considered the track a "high-energy pop anthem" that "balances its exciting chorus with sing-talk verses that ooze attitude," adding that the "slick production manages to capture Katseye's self-assurance despite being newcomers." Billboard Philippines' Gabriel Saulog commented that the song "marks a strong introduction to their unique sound and artistry," while The Hollywood Reporter's Nicole Fell called it a "powerful and youthful pop track."

== Music video ==
Directed by Gregory Ohrel, the music video filmed in Medellín, Colombia, premiered alongside the single. The video follows the girls through different places in the city, such as the Gilberto Echeverri Mejía Bridge, the C4TA, and the skatepark at the Atanasio Girardot Stadium.

== Live performances ==
Katseye first performed "Debut" on July 29 at KCON. They later performed on the August 5 broadcast of Good Morning America.

== Credits and personnel ==
Credits are adapted from Apple Music.

- Katseye – vocals
- Ryan Tedder – writer, producer, vocal production, background vocals
- Tyler Spry – writer, producer, vocal production
- Grant Boutin – writer, producer
- Omer Fedi – writer
- Serban Ghenea – mixing
  - Bryce Bordone – assistant
- Chris Gehringer – mastering
  - Will Quinnell – assistant

== Charts ==
=== Weekly charts ===
Weekly chart performance for "Touch"
| Chart (2024–2026) | Peak position |
|---|---|
| Global K-Songs (Billboard Korea) | 40 |
| Panama Streaming (PRODUCE) | 2444 |
| South Korea Download (Circle) | 194 |
| UK Video Streaming (OCC) | 49 |

=== Monthly charts ===
Monthly chart performance
| Chart (2026) | Peak position |
|---|---|
| Panama Streaming (PRODUCE) | 2772 |

== Certifications ==
Certifications for "Debut"
| Region | Certification | Certified units/sales |
|---|---|---|
| Brazil (Pro-Música Brasil) | 3× Platinum | 120,000^{‡} |
| Canada (Music Canada) | Gold | 40,000^{‡} |
| New Zealand (RMNZ) | Gold | 15,000^{‡} |
| United Kingdom (BPI) | Silver | 200,000^{‡} |
^{‡} Sales+streaming figures based on certification alone.
