= Touch (Katseye song) =

2024 single by Katseye

Single by Katseye

from the EP SIS (Soft Is Strong)
- Released: July 26, 2024
- Genre: Dance-pop; liquid drum and bass; R&B
- Length: 2:09
- Label: Hybe UMG; Geffen
- Composers: Ailin; Porfiri; Blake Slatkin; Magnus August Høiberg; Omer Fedi; Taka Perry
- Lyricists: Caroline Ailin; Jessica Mimi Porfiri
- Producers: Slatkin; Cashmere Cat; Fedi; Perry

Katseye singles chronology
"Debut" (2024)	"Touch" (2024)	"Gnarly" (2025)

Yeonjun singles chronology
"Ggum" (2024)	"Touch" (remix) (2024)	"Talk to You" (2025)

Music video
- "Touch" on YouTube

"Touch" is a song by girl group Katseye from their first extended play SIS (Soft Is Strong) (2024). It was released on July 26, 2024, through Hybe UMG and Geffen Records as the second single from the EP. The song is a liquid drum and bass-infused dance-pop song with R&B undertones about moving on from a lover.

"Touch" became a commercial success after a dance challenge to the song went viral on TikTok, entering the charts of Canada, Singapore, Malaysia, South Korea, and the Philippines as well as the Billboard Global 200 and US Bubbling Under Hot 100 chart.

== Background and release ==
On June 28, 2024, Katseye released their first single "Debut", which garnered 2.3 million views within three days of release. Following the single, they announced their next single "Touch" on July 23. The single was released on July 26, 2024. The song impacted US contemporary hit radio on September 20, 2024. A remix featuring Tomorrow X Together's Yeonjun was released a month later on October 11, 2024.

== Composition and critical reception ==
Professional ratings
Review scores
Source	Rating
IZM	2/5 stars

"Touch" was described by Grammys' Carmin Chappell as a drum and bass song with R&B undertones about moving on from a lover. IZM's So Seung-geun called "Touch" a stark contrast from their upbeat first single "Debut", giving the single two out of five stars in a negative review. Whereas in more positive reviews, Mika Chen of NME called the song "a dreamy dance-pop salute to independence" and The Times of India commended it as a pop anthem with a lively yet nuanced melody which showcases the group's enchanting vocals along with Music Daily who called the chorus "candy-lacquered, liquid drum-and-bass".

== Accolades ==
Awards and nominations for "Touch"
Organisation	Year	Category	Result	Ref.
APRA Music Awards	2026	Most Performed Australian Work	Nominated	
APRA Music Awards	2026	Most Performed Pop Work	Nominated	
MTV Video Music Awards	2025	Push Performance of the Year	Won	

== Commercial performance ==
"Touch" emerged as the group's breakthrough single, entering the charts in Canada, Singapore, Malaysia, Hong Kong, the Philippines and South Korea as well as charting on the Billboard Bubbling Under Hot 100 and Billboard Global 200 in September 2024 after a dance challenge to the song went viral on the video-sharing platform TikTok and garnered heavy attention. The song also debuted at number 16 on the New Zealand Hot Singles chart.

== Music video ==
Directed by Cody Critcheloe, the music video shot in Los Angeles premiered alongside the single. The video that is heavily inspired by the late 90s and early 2000s, with a noticeable Y2K aesthetic, follows a citywide search for member Sophia who has reportedly gone missing. Throughout the video each of the member's dream "charms" (Sophia's dream anchor, Megan's dual cherry, Daniela's guardian shield, Lara's limitless key, Manon's stellar tiara and Yoonchae's soothing shell) which symbolize their unique qualities are shown. The video was highlighted for its nostalgic elements and energetic choreography. The music video has garnered over 50 million views, according to figures reported in November 2024.

== Live performances ==
In South Korea, Katseye first performed "Touch" on the September 12 broadcast of M Countdown. They then performed on Music Bank on September 13, and Show! Music Core on September 14.

== Credits and personnel ==
- Katseye – vocals
- Taka Perry – writer, producer
- Cashmere Cat – writer, producer
- Blake Slatkin – writer, producer, vocal production
- Omer Fedi – writer, producer, vocal production
- Caroline Ailin – writer
- Jessica Mimi Porfiri – writer
- Bart Schoudel – vocal production, recording
- Alex Ghenea – mixing
- Chris Gehringer – mastering
  - Will Quinnell – assistant

== Charts ==
=== Weekly charts ===
Weekly chart performance for "Touch"
Chart (2024–2026)	Peak position
Canada Hot 100 (Billboard)	79
Global 200 (Billboard)	58
Japan Hot Overseas (Billboard Japan)	4
Malaysia (Billboard)	9
New Zealand Hot Singles (RMNZ)	16
Philippines Hot 100 (Billboard Philippines)	13
Singapore (RIAS)	5
South Korea (Circle)	70
Taiwan (Billboard)	17
UK Singles (Official Charts)	82
US Bubbling Under Hot 100 (Billboard)	2
US Pop Airplay (Billboard)	32

=== Monthly charts ===
Monthly chart performance for "Touch"
Chart (2024)	Peak position
South Korea (Circle)	84

== Certifications ==
Certifications for "Touch"
Region	Certification	Certified units/sales
Australia (ARIA)	Platinum	70,000^{‡}
Brazil (Pro-Música Brasil)	Diamond	160,000^{‡}
Canada (Music Canada)	Platinum	80,000^{‡}
France (SNEP)	Gold	100,000^{‡}
New Zealand (RMNZ)	Platinum	30,000^{‡}
Poland (ZPAV)	Gold	62,500^{‡}
United Kingdom (BPI)	Silver	200,000^{‡}
^{‡} Sales+streaming figures based on certification alone.

== Release history ==
Release history for "Touch"
Region	Date	Format	Version	Label	Ref.
Various	July 26, 2024	Digital download; streaming	Original	Hybe UMG; Geffen	
United States	September 20, 2024	Contemporary hit radio	Original	Hybe UMG; ICLG	
Various	October 11, 2024	Digital download; streaming	Yeonjun remix	Hybe UMG; Geffen	
Various	November 22, 2024	Digital download; streaming	Holiday version	Hybe UMG; Geffen	
