= YNG Martyr =

Australian rapper (born 2000)

- Also known as: YNG Martyr
- Born: Seaton Hamish Rogers; 2000 (age 25–26)
- Origin: Canberra, Australia
- Genre: Hip-hop
- Occupations: Singer-songwriter, rapper
- Years active: 2018–present
- Labels: Dew Process, Secret Sounds

Seaton Rogers, better known as YNG Martyr, is an Australian rapper based in Melbourne. He is known for his distinctive style and unconventional marketing tactics, including freestyling in Call of Duty's online gaming chat rooms and utilizing popular meme formats to expand his footprint and listenership.

Martyr gained attention for his song "Nike Ticks," which he promoted by utilizing popular Instagram meme formats that incorporated the song. Following the song's popularity, Rogers secured a record deal and launched YNG Marketing, which works alongside Empire Distribution and The Orchard.

== Biography ==
Rogers grew up in North Queensland, Australia. His family is Wiradjuri from Mudgee. Rogers signed with Warner Music Australia in 2022.

When Rogers was 17 years old, he overdosed on NBOMe that was fraudulently sold as LSD.

In 2024, Rogers partnered with Call of Duty for the release of Black Ops 6 to create an advertising campaign.

In 2025, Rogers made Logan Paul's WWE entrance theme song.

Rogers has cited numerous literary influences in his personal life and creative work, including Carl Jung and The Alchemist by Paulo Coelho.

Rogers has toured with notable acts such as Iann Dior, DC the Don, SXMPRA, Illy, and more, and performed at music festivals including SXSW, Spilt Milk, Falls Festival, and on Triple J.

== Discography ==
=== Albums ===
List of albums, with selected details
Title	Details	Peak chart positions
Title	Details	AUS
Lovesick	Released: 11 August 2023; Label: YNG Martyr, Warner Music Australia	—
Chalant	Released: 27 March 2026; Label: YNG Martyr, GYR	64
