= List of songs written by Seventeen members =

List of songs written by members of Seventeen

Seventeen is a South Korean boy band consisting of S.Coups, Jeonghan, Joshua, Jun, Hoshi, Wonwoo, Woozi, The8, Mingyu, DK, Seungkwan, Vernon and Dino. The group is known for its members' involvement in the production of its music, with members participating in songwriting, composition and other aspects of album and performance production from before their debut. Woozi serves as Seventeen's main producer and has written and composed the majority of the group's songs. Woozi, Vernon and S.Coups were promoted to full membership of the Korea Music Copyright Association (KOMCA) in 2019, 2024 and 2025, respectively.

The list includes released songs for which at least one Seventeen member is credited with lyrics, composition or arrangement, including songs recorded by other artists. For the purposes of this list, released songs are recordings issued on an official physical release or through formal digital distribution. Other works registered with the Korea Music Copyright Association (KOMCA) for which no such formal commercial release distribution has been identified are listed separately. Recordings performed by Seventeen or its members without member songwriting credits are also listed separately.

Songwriting credits are adapted from KOMCA unless stated otherwise.

== Key ==
- **Bold** denotes a title track.
- Pale green cells denote title tracks by Seventeen.
- Pale lavender cells denote Japanese singles by Seventeen.
- ◆ denotes a single by Seventeen.
- ◇ denotes a title track by a Seventeen subunit or member.
- ⁂ denotes a song for which another artist is the lead artist.
- Korean ver., Japanese ver., and Chinese ver. denote language versions.
- Member name denotes a member of Seventeen in the songwriting credits.
- ‡ denotes a Seventeen member credited as a lyricist, composer or arranger who is not a performer on the recording.

== Released songs written by Seventeen members ==
0–9 · A · B · C · D · E · F · G · H · I · J · K · L · M · N · O · P · Q · R · S · T · V · W · Y · Z

Released songs written by Seventeen members
Song	Artist(s)	Album / release	Lyrics	Composition	Arrangement	Year	Ref.
"1 TO 13"	Seventeen	Spill the Feels	Bumzu, Woozi	Bumzu, Woozi, Park Ki-tae, Andreas Oberg, Shapiro Benjamin Gabriel, Jonsson Christoffer Oskar	—	2024	
"17cg" (Note: Samples Seventeen's "Holiday".) ⁂	tobi lou	Live on Ice	Bumzu, S.Coups‡, Woozi‡, Wonwoo‡, Park Ki-tae, Tobi Lou, Julian-Quan Viet Le	Bumzu, S.Coups‡, Woozi‡, Wonwoo‡, Park Ki-tae, Tobi Lou, Julian-Quan Viet Le	—	2019	
"2 MINUS 1"	Seventeen (Joshua × Vernon)	Attacca	Bumzu, Vernon, Joshua	Bumzu, Woozi‡, Vernon, Joshua, Hey Farmer	Bumzu, Hey Farmer	2021	
"20" Korean ver. Japanese ver.	Seventeen (Vocal Team)	17 Carat; We Make You	Woozi; Japanese ver.: Y.A	Woozi, Won Young-heon; Korean ver.: Dong Ne-hyeong; Japanese ver.: Noh Hyun	Won Young-heon; Korean ver.: Dong Ne-hyeong; Japanese ver.: Noh Hyun	2015 (Note: The Japanese version was released in 2018.)	
"247" Korean ver. Japanese ver.	Seventeen (Performance Team)	An Ode; 24H	Bumzu, Woozi‡ Korean ver.: Dino, Hoshi, The8; Japanese ver.: Haru.Robinson	Bumzu, Woozi‡ Korean ver.: Park Ki-tae	Bumzu, Park Ki-tae	2019 (Note: The Japanese version was released in 2020.)	
**"24H"** ◆	Seventeen	24H	Woozi, Bumzu, Haru.Robinson	Woozi, Bumzu, Park Ki-tae	Park Ki-tae	2020	
"24H" Korean ver.	Seventeen	17 Is Right Here	Bumzu, Woozi	Bumzu, Woozi, Park Ki-tae	Park Ki-tae	2024	
**"5, 4, 3 (Pretty woman) (feat. Lay Bankz)"** ◇	CxM feat. Lay Bankz	Hype Vibes	Bumzu, S.Coups, Mingyu, Shannon Bae, Lay Bankz, Roy Orbison, William Dees, Eric Kihnoon Seo	Bumzu, S.Coups, Mingyu, Ohway!, Roy Orbison, William Dees	—	2025	
"54321 (Lift Off) (feat. Vernon of Seventeen)"	The8 feat. Vernon	Stardust	Vernon, The8, Robb Roy	Vernon, The8, NicolKeem, Robb Roy, Numbernine	NicolKeem, Numbernine	2024	
"7PM (feat. Peder Elias)"	BSS feat. Peder Elias	Second Wind	Bumzu, Woozi‡, Hoshi, DK, Seungkwan, Peder Elias	Bumzu, Woozi‡, Peder Elias	—	2023	
"9-TEEN"	Seventeen	A-TEEN2 Part.2 (soundtrack)	Bumzu, S.Coups, Woozi, Mingyu	Bumzu, Woozi, Boombastic	Boombastic	2019	
**"96ers"** ◇	HxW	Beam	Bumzu, Woozi, Hoshi	Bumzu, Jake K, Benji Bae, Andreas Öberg, OLLIPOP, Cesar Peralta, Ryan Lawrie, Christoffer Jonsson	—	2025	
"99.9%"	Seventeen (Wonwoo solo)	Happy Burstday	Woozi‡	El Capitxn, Woozi‡, Vendors Zenur	El Capitxn, Vendors Zenur	2025	
"A-TEEN"	Seventeen (Joshua × Hoshi × Woozi × Vernon × Dino)	A-TEEN OST Part.3 (soundtrack)	Bumzu, Woozi, Dino, Vernon	Bumzu, Woozi, Boombastic	Boombastic	2018	
**"Adore U"** ◆	Seventeen	17 Carat	Bumzu, S.Coups, Woozi, Vernon	Bumzu, Woozi, Yeom Dong-geon	Bumzu	2015	
"Adore U" (Vocal Team ver.)	Seventeen (Vocal Team)	First 'Love&Letter'	Bumzu, S.Coups‡, Woozi, Vernon‡, DK, Seungkwan	Bumzu, Woozi, Yeom Dong-geon	Bumzu, Lee Ki-yong, Woozi	2016	
"AH! LOVE"	Seventeen (S.Coups × Jeonghan × Joshua)	Semicolon	Bumzu, S.Coups, Woozi‡, Jeonghan, Joshua	Bumzu, Woozi‡, Park Ki-tae	Bumzu, Park Ki-tae	2020	
"Ah Yeah"	Seventeen (Hip-Hop Team)	17 Carat	S.Coups, Woozi‡, Wonwoo, Vernon, Mingyu	Ri Si	—	2015	
"All My Love" Korean ver. Japanese ver.	Seventeen	Semicolon; Dream	Bumzu, Woozi, Seungkwan; Korean ver.: Vernon; Japanese ver.: BARBORA	Bumzu, Woozi; Korean ver.: Park Ki-tae	Bumzu; Korean ver.: Park Ki-tae	2020 (Note: The Japanese version was released in 2022.)	
"Anyone"	Seventeen	Your Choice	Bumzu, S.Coups, Woozi	Bumzu, Woozi	Bumzu, Lee MinGyu	2021	
"April shower"	Seventeen	FML	Bumzu, Woozi, Peter Chun, James Kareem	Bumzu, Woozi, Peter Chun, James Kareem	—	2023	
"Ash"	Seventeen	Face the Sun	Bumzu, Woozi, Vernon, Woo Chang-seong, Lee Nicholas David, Kyan Palmer	Bumzu, Woozi, Vernon, Woo Chang-seong, Lee Nicholas David, Kyan Palmer	—	2022	
"Baby, Honey"	Hoshi	(single)	Hoshi, Heon Seo, FAIELO, DEN, Hardy, Bae Jin-seok, JungHun	Hoshi, Heon Seo, FAIELO, DEN, Hardy, Bae Jin-seok	—	2026	
"Back 2 Back"	Seventeen (Performance Team)	Seventeenth Heaven	Bumzu, Woozi‡, Hoshi	Wontak Han, Bumzu, Woozi‡	Wontak Han	2023	
"Back It Up"	Seventeen (Hip-Hop Team)	An Ode	S.Coups, Wonwoo, Vernon, Mingyu	Bumzu, Lee KiYong	Bumzu, Lee KiYong	2019	
"BEAT"	V8	V8	Vernon, The8, Robb Roy, Gao Longyu	Vernon, The8, Robb Roy, Gao Longyu, Julien David Lopes, Lucian, Sophie Marcella Cates	—	2026	
"Beautiful"	Seventeen (Joshua × Hoshi × DK × Mingyu × The8 × Dino)	Going Seventeen	Bumzu, Woozi‡, Dino, Mingyu	Bumzu, Lee KiYong, Woozi‡, Mingyu	Bumzu, Lee KiYong	2016	
"Beautiful Monster"	JxW (Jeonghan solo)	This Man	Bumzu, Woozi‡	Bumzu, Woozi‡, Jintae Ko, David Brook, Mike Gonek	—	2024	
"Beg for You" (A. G. Cook and Vernon of Seventeen Remix) ⁂	Charli XCX feat. Rina Sawayama	Beg for You (A. G. Cook and Vernon of Seventeen Remix)	Bumzu, Vernon, Charli XCX, Rina Sawayama, Jonas Torsten von der Burg, Anoo Finn Ananda Bhagavan, Niclas Torsten von der Burg, Alexander N. Soifer, Sorana Pacurar, Nicholas Gale, Rollo Spreckley	Bumzu, Vernon, Charli XCX, Rina Sawayama, Jonas Torsten von der Burg, Anoo Finn Ananda Bhagavan, Niclas Torsten von der Burg, Alexander N. Soifer, Sorana Pacurar, Nicholas Gale, Rollo Spreckley	—	2022	
"Bittersweet" (feat. Lee Hi)	Wonwoo & Mingyu feat. Lee Hi	(single)	Bumzu, Wonwoo, Mingyu, Jo Yoon-kyung	Bumzu	Bumzu, Nmore	2021	
Black Eye	Vernon	(single)	Vernon, Robb Roy	Vernon, Ohway!, Robb Roy, Hong Hoon-gi	—	2022	
**"BOOMBOOM"** ◆	Seventeen	Going Seventeen	Bumzu, S.Coups, Woozi, Wonwoo, Vernon, Mingyu	Bumzu, Woozi	Bumzu	2016	
"'bout you"	Seventeen	Face the Sun	Bumzu, Woozi	Bumzu, Woozi, Park Ki-tae	Park Ki-tae	2022	
"Bring It"	Seventeen (Hoshi × Woozi)	Teen, Age	Woozi, Hoshi, Vernon‡	Woozi, Won Young-heon, Dong Ne-hyeong, Min Siki	Won Young-heon, Dong Ne-hyeong, Min Siki	2017	
"Bucket List (feat. Vernon of Seventeen)" ⁂	Bumzu feat. Vernon	Good Life	Bumzu, Vernon	Bumzu, Jeon Byeong-seon, Hong Young-in	Bumzu	2015	
"Bumaye" (Remix) ⁂	Drunken Tiger feat. Bizzy and Vernon	Rebirth of Tiger JK	Vernon, Bizzy, Tiger JK	Loptimist	Loptimist	2018	
**"CALL CALL CALL!"** ◆	Seventeen	We Make You	Woozi, Bumzu, Yu Shimoji	Woozi, Bumzu, Park Ki-tae	Bumzu	2018	
"CALL CALL CALL!" Korean ver.	Seventeen	17 Is Right Here	Bumzu, Woozi	Bumzu, Woozi, Park Ki-tae	Bumzu, Park Ki-tae	2024	
"Campfire"	Seventeen	Teen, Age	Bumzu, S.Coups, Woozi, Wonwoo, Vernon, Mingyu, DK, Seungkwan, The8, Jeonghan	Bumzu, Woozi, Won Young-heon, Dong Ne-hyeong	YamaArt, Won Young-heon, Dong Ne-hyeong	2017	
"Can You Sit By My Side?"	Jun	(single)	Jun, Song Bingyang	Groovie K, Song Bingyang	—	2018	
"Candy"	Seventeen (Vocal Team)	Spill the Feels	Bumzu, Woozi	Bumzu, Woozi, Lee Beom-hun	Bumzu, Lee Beom-hun	2024	
**"CBZ (Prime time)"** ◇	BSS	Teleparty	Bumzu, Woozi‡, Hoshi, DK, Seungkwan	Bumzu, Woozi‡	Bumzu, BuildingOwner	2025	
"Change Up"	Seventeen (SVT Leaders)	Teen, Age	Bumzu, S.Coups, Woozi, Hoshi	Bumzu, Woozi, Hoshi	Bumzu	2017	
"Check-In" (Remastering)	Seventeen (Hip-Hop Team)	Al1	S.Coups, Wonwoo, Vernon, Mingyu	Bumzu	Bumzu	2017	
"Cheers"	Seventeen (SVT Leaders)	Sector 17	Bumzu, S.Coups, Woozi, Hoshi, Vernon‡	Bumzu, Woozi, Vernon‡, Lee MinGyu	Bumzu, Lee MinGyu	2022	
"Cheers to youth"	Seventeen (Vocal Team)	17 Is Right Here	Bumzu, Woozi	Bumzu, Woozi	Bumzu, Woozi, Lee MinGyu	2024	
"Chilli" Korean ver. Japanese ver.	Seventeen (Hip-Hop Team)	You Made My Dawn; 24H	S.Coups, Vernon, Mingyu; Korean ver.: Wonwoo; Japanese ver.: Haru.Robinson	Bumzu, Vernon; Korean ver.: Pop Time	Pop Time	2019 (Note: The Japanese version was released in 2020.)	
"Chuck"	Seventeen	First 'Love&Letter'	S.Coups, Woozi, Wonwoo, Dino, Vernon, Mingyu	Woozi, Won Young-heon, Dong Ne-hyeong	Won Young-heon, Dong Ne-hyeong	2016	
"Circles" Korean ver. Japanese ver.	Seventeen	Sector 17; Shohikigen	Bumzu, Woozi; Japanese ver.: BARBORA	Bumzu, Nmore, Woozi	Bumzu; Korean ver.: Nmore	2022 (Note: The Japanese version was released in 2024.)	
**"Clap"** ◆	Seventeen	Teen, Age	Bumzu, Woozi, Hoshi, Mingyu, DK, Seungkwan, Jeonghan	Bumzu, Woozi, Park Ki-tae	Bumzu, Park Ki-tae	2017	
"Coincidence"	Seventeen (Jeonghan solo)	Happy Burstday	Woozi‡	Woozi‡, Lee Beom-hun	Woozi‡, Lee Beom-hun	2025	
"coloring"	V8	V8	Vernon, The8, Robb Roy	Vernon, The8, Bad Tree, Robb Roy, Numbernine	—	2026	
"Come to me"	Seventeen (Vocal Team)	You Make My Day	Bumzu, Woozi	Bumzu, Woozi	Bumzu, Woozi	2018	
"Crazy in Love"	Seventeen	Al1	Bumzu, S.Coups, Woozi, Vernon, Mingyu	Bumzu, Lee KiYong, Woozi	Bumzu, Lee KiYong	2017	
"Crush"	Seventeen	Attacca	Bumzu, Woozi, Vernon, Maggiani Aris Andreas, Hoveyda Analise Nika	Bumzu, Seulgi Park, Woozi, Te Sung David Kim, Kim Ryan, Mack Tiyon C, Cameron Martin Aliff	—	2021	
"Damage"	Seventeen feat. Timbaland (Hoshi solo)	Happy Burstday	Woozi‡, Hoshi	Woozi‡, Angel Lopez, Federico Vindver, Timbaland	—	2025	
"Dandelion"	Seungkwan	(single)	Seungkwan, Choi Yu-ri	Seungkwan, Choi Yu-ri	Choi Yu-ri, Moon Ji-hyeok	2024	
"Darl+ing" ◆	Seventeen	Face the Sun	Bumzu, Woozi, Shannon Bae	Bumzu, Woozi, Hwang Hyun	Bumzu, Hwang Hyun	2022	
"Darl+ing" (Holiday ver.)	Seventeen	Dream	Bumzu, Woozi, Shannon Bae	Bumzu, Woozi, Hwang Hyun	Bumzu, Nmore, Hwang Hyun	2022	
"Diamond Days"	Seventeen	Seventeenth Heaven	Bumzu, Jeon Gan Di, S.Coups, Woozi, Vernon	Bumzu, Ri Si, Woozi, Masterkey	Bumzu	2023	
"Do Re Mi"	Seventeen (Seungkwan × Vernon × Dino)	Semicolon	Bumzu, Woozi‡, Dino, Vernon, Seungkwan	Bumzu, Pop Time, Woozi‡, Vernon	Bumzu, Pop Time	2020	
"Domino"	Seventeen	Face the Sun	Bumzu, Woozi, Mingyu, Jordan Witzigreuter, Cameron Walker, Sara Davis	Bumzu, Woozi, Mingyu, Jordan Witzigreuter, Cameron Walker, Sara Davis	—	2022	
"Don Quixote"	Seventeen	Face the Sun	Bumzu, Woozi, Wonwoo, Melanie Joy Fontana, Michel Schulz, Steven Robert Franks, Thomas Lee Brown	Bumzu, Woozi, Wonwoo, Melanie Joy Fontana, Michel Schulz, Steven Robert Franks, Thomas Lee Brown	—	2022	
"Don't Listen in Secret"	Seventeen (Vocal Team)	Going Seventeen	Woozi	Woozi, Won Young-heon, Dong Ne-hyeong	Bae Jin-pyo, Won Young-heon, Dong Ne-hyeong	2016	
**"Don't Wanna Cry"** ◆	Seventeen	Al1	Bumzu, S.Coups, Woozi, Hoshi, Jeonghan, Andrew Taggart, Guy Berryman, Jonny Buckland, Will Champion, Chris Martin	Bumzu, Woozi, Andrew Taggart, Guy Berryman, Jonny Buckland, Will Champion, Chris Martin	—	2017	
"Downpour" (live version) (Note: Cover of I.O.I's "Downpour".) ⁂	Han Dong-geun	King of Mask Singer 158th	Woozi‡	Bae Jin-pyo, Woozi‡, Won Young-heon, Dong Ne-hyeong	Pat Music	2018	
"Downpour" ⁂	I.O.I	(single)	Woozi‡	Bae Jin-pyo, Woozi‡, Won Young-heon, Dong Ne-hyeong	Bae Jin-pyo, Won Young-heon, Dong Ne-hyeong	2017	
**"Dream"** ◆	Seventeen	Dream	Woozi, Bumzu, BARBORA	Woozi, Bumzu, Lee Beom-hun	Bumzu	2022	
"Dream" Korean ver.	Seventeen	17 Is Right Here	Bumzu, Woozi	Bumzu, Woozi, Lee Beom-hun	—	2024	
"Dream Serenade"	DxS (Seungkwan solo)	Serenade	Jeon Jin-hee, Seungkwan	Jehwi, Seungkwan, Kang Ji-won	—	2026	
"Drift Away"	Seventeen (S.Coups × Jeonghan × Joshua × Mingyu × The8 × Seungkwan)	First 'Love&Letter'	S.Coups, Woozi‡, Hoshi‡, Mingyu, Seungkwan	Woozi‡	Bumzu	2016	
"Dust"	Seventeen (Vocal Team)	FML	Bumzu, Woozi	Bumzu, Woozi, Park Ki-tae	Bumzu, Park Ki-tae	2023	
"Earth"	CxM	Hype Vibes	Bumzu, S.Coups, Mingyu	153/Joombas, Bumzu, S.Coups, Mingyu, Stella Jones, Hirsh Jackson, Lukas Costas	—	2025	
"ECHO! (Prod. WOOZI)"	HxW	World of Street Woman Fighter (WSWF) Original Vol.2 (Class Mission)	Bumzu, Woozi, Hoshi	Bumzu, Jin Jeon, Woozi	Bumzu, Jin Jeon	2025	
"Eyes on You"	Seventeen	Spill the Feels	Bumzu, S.Coups, Woozi, Vernon	Bumzu, Woozi, Key Shift	—	2024	
**"Fallin' Flower"** (舞い落ちる花びら) ◆	Seventeen	(single)	Bumzu, Woozi, Dino, Haru.Robinson	Bumzu, Woozi, Park Ki-tae	Bumzu, Park Ki-tae	2020	
"Fallin' Flower" Korean ver.	Seventeen	Sector 17	Bumzu, Woozi, Dino	Bumzu, Woozi, Park Ki-tae	Bumzu, Park Ki-tae	2022	
"Falling for U"	Seventeen (Jeonghan × Joshua)	Director's Cut	Bumzu, Woozi‡, Jeonghan, Joshua	Bumzu, Jeong Jae-won, Woozi‡, Jeonghan, Joshua	Bumzu	2018	
"Fast Pace"	Seventeen	Going Seventeen	S.Coups, Woozi, Hoshi, Vernon	Woozi, Seo Jung-jin, Fascinating, Keeproots	Seo Jung-jin, Fascinating, Keeproots	2016	
**"F*ck My Life"** ◆	Seventeen	FML	Bumzu, Woozi	Bumzu, Woozi	Bumzu, Kim Kwan-young	2023	
**"Fear"** ◆	Seventeen	An Ode	Bumzu, S.Coups, Woozi, Vernon	Bumzu, Woozi	Bumzu, Park Ki-tae	2019	
"Fearless"	Seventeen	Heng:garæ	Bumzu, Woozi, Vernon	Bumzu, Woozi, Simon Petren	Bumzu, Simon Petren	2020	
"Feel Me"	DxS	(single)	Kim Ahyeon, Na Woong-jae, Seungkwan, Kim Ji-eon, Park Ji-yoon	Ryan Curtis Joseph, Okhan Uenver, Sean Fischer, Lucas Marston	—	2026	
"Feelin' (feat. Eric Nam)" ⁂	Ailee feat. Eric Nam	A New Empire	Ailee, Woozi‡	Hymax, Ailee, Hong Di, Famousbro	—	2016	
"Fiesta"	CxM	Hype Vibes	Bumzu, Jake K, S.Coups, Mingyu, Andreas Oberg, Christoffer Jonsson	Bumzu, Jake K, S.Coups, Mingyu, Benji Bae, Andreas Oberg, Ryan Curtis, Ninos Hanna, William Segerdahl, Christoffer Jonsson, Kalvin Beal	—	2025	
**"Fighting"** ◇	BSS feat. Lee Young-ji	Second Wind	Bumzu, Woozi‡, Hoshi, DK, Seungkwan, Lee Young-ji	Bumzu, S.Coups‡, Woozi‡, Hoshi, Park Ki-tae	—	2023	
"Fire"	Seventeen (Hip-Hop Team)	FML	Bumzu, S.Coups, Woozi‡, Wonwoo, Vernon, Mingyu	Bumzu, Wonwoo, Vernon	Bumzu	2023	
"Flower"	Seventeen (S.Coups × Jeonghan × Wonwoo × The8 × Seungkwan × Dino)	Teen, Age	Bumzu, S.Coups, Woozi‡, Wonwoo, Dino, Seungkwan, The8, Jeonghan	Bumzu	Bumzu	2017	
"For JEONG and LOVE"	Picheolin	吉BOARD (Gilboard)	Dino	MINIT, Dino, Millionboy	MINIT, Millionboy	2026	
"For you"	CxM	Hype Vibes	Bumzu, S.Coups, Mingyu, Melanie Fontana, Michel Schulz, GG Ramirez, Jack Samson	S.Coups, Mingyu, Hautboi Rich, Melanie Fontana, Michel Schulz, GG Ramirez, Jack Samson	—	2025	
"Forever Young" ⁂	Bumzu and Han Dong-geun	(single)	Bumzu, Han Dong-geun, Woozi‡, Hoshi‡, Simon Petrén	Bumzu, Han Dong-geun, Cho Min-kyung, Simon Petrén	Park Ki-tae	2017	
"Fortunate Change"	Seventeen (Joshua solo)	Happy Burstday	Woozi‡	Woozi‡, Ohway!	Woozi‡, Ohway!	2025	
"Fronting"	Seventeen (S.Coups × Hoshi × Wonwoo × Woozi × Mingyu × Vernon)	Boys Be	S.Coups, Woozi, Wonwoo, Vernon, Mingyu	Bumzu	—	2015	
"GAM3 BO1"	Seventeen (Hip-Hop Team)	Your Choice	Bumzu, S.Coups, Woozi‡, Wonwoo, Vernon, Mingyu	Bumzu, Vernon, Kim Daniel	Bumzu, Kim Daniel	2021	
"Gemini"	Seventeen (Jun solo)	Happy Burstday	Hwang Yubin, Jun, Jo Yoon-kyung	Ele, Vincenzo, Quero Linda, Jordan Shaw	—	2025	
"Getting Closer" ◆	Seventeen	You Made My Dawn	Bumzu, S.Coups, Woozi, Vernon	Bumzu, Woozi, Hoshi	Bumzu	2019	
"그리워 안 해" ⁂	Bumzu	(single)	Woozi‡	Woozi‡, Park Ki-tae	Park Ki-tae	2018	
"girlsnboys"	V8	V8	Bumzu, Vernon, The8, Pharrell Williams, Rudolph	Bumzu, Vernon, The8, Pharrell Williams, Rudolph	—	2026	
"Glue Stick (feat. Hoody)" ⁂	Yugyeom feat. Hoody	Interlunar	Vernon‡, Yugyeom, Robb Roy	Vernon‡, Yugyeom, Robb Roy, DJ Wegun	DJ Wegun	2025	
"God of Light Music"	Seventeen	(single)	Bumzu, S.Coups, Woozi, Vernon, Mingyu, Jun	Bumzu, Woozi, Park Ki-tae	Bumzu, Park Ki-tae, Lee Beom-hun	2023	
**"God of Music"** ◆	Seventeen	Seventeenth Heaven	Bumzu, S.Coups, Woozi, Vernon, Mingyu	Bumzu, Woozi, Park Ki-tae	Bumzu, Park Ki-tae, Lee Beom-hun	2023	
"Gogae"	Wonwoo	(single)	Bumzu, Wonwoo	Bumzu, Wonwoo, Park Ki-tae	Bumzu, Park Ki-tae, Lee Beom-hun	2025	
"Good to Me" Korean ver. Japanese ver.	Seventeen	You Made My Dawn; Fallin' Flower	Bumzu, Woozi; Japanese ver.: Haru.Robinson	Bumzu, Woozi	Bumzu, Park Ki-tae	2019 (Note: The Japanese version was released in 2020.)	
"Habit"	Seventeen (Vocal Team)	Al1	Woozi	Woozi, Cho Min-kyung, Simon Petrén	—	2017	
"Hai Cheng" (海城)	The8	(single)	The8	Woozi‡, The8, Lee Beom-hun	Lee Beom-hun	2022	
"Happy Alone"	BSS	Teleparty	Bumzu, Woozi‡, Hoshi, DK, Seungkwan	Bumzu, Woozi‡, Tobias Näslund	—	2025	
**"Happy Ending"** ◆	Seventeen	(single)	Woozi, Bumzu, Haru.Robinson	Woozi, Bumzu	Bumzu, Anchor	2019	
"Happy Ending" Korean ver.	Seventeen	An Ode	Bumzu, Woozi	Bumzu, Woozi	Bumzu, Lee KiYong	2019	
"Happy Virus"	Seventeen (DK solo)	Happy Burstday	Woozi‡, DK	Building Owner, Woozi‡	Building Owner, Woozi‡	2025	
"HBD"	Seventeen	Happy Burstday	Bumzu, Woozi	Bumzu, Building Owner, Woozi, Young Chance, Benjamin55, Stary John, Lee Samuel, Copeland Desmond	—	2025	
"Headliner"	Seventeen	Seventeenth Heaven	Bumzu, Woozi	Bumzu, Woozi	Bumzu, Park Ki-tae	2023	
"Healing" Korean ver. Japanese ver.	Seventeen	Love & Letter; Happy Ending	S.Coups, Woozi, Dino, Vernon, Mingyu; Japanese ver.: Haru.Robinson, Y.A	Woozi, Won Young-heon; Korean ver.: Dong Ne-hyeong	Won Young-heon, Noh Hyun	2016 (Note: The Japanese version was released in 2019.)	
"Heaven's Cloud"	Seventeen	Your Choice	Bumzu, S.Coups, Woozi, Mingyu	Bumzu, Nmore, Woozi	Bumzu, Nmore	2021	
"Hello"	Seventeen (DK × Jun × Mingyu)	Teen, Age	Bumzu, Mingyu, DK, Jun	Bumzu, DK	Bumzu, Lee KiYong	2017	
"Hey Buddy"	Seventeen (The8 × Mingyu × DK)	Semicolon	Bumzu, Woozi‡, Mingyu, DK, The8	Bumzu, Lee KiYong, Woozi‡, Mingyu, DK, The8, Lee MinGyu	Bumzu, Lee KiYong, Lee MinGyu	2020	
"Highlight" Korean ver. Japanese ver.	Seventeen (Performance Team)	Going Seventeen; We Make You	Bumzu, Dino, Hoshi, Jun, The8, Lee Yu-jeong; Japanese ver.: Y.A	Bumzu, Hoshi	Bumzu	2016 (Note: The Japanese version was released in 2018.)	
"HIT" ◆	Seventeen	An Ode	Bumzu, Woozi, Vernon	Bumzu, Woozi	Bumzu, Lee KiYong	2019	
"Hit Song"	Seventeen	First 'Love&Letter'	Bumzu, S.Coups, Dino, Vernon, Mingyu	Bumzu	Bumzu, In Young-hoon	2016	
"Holiday"	Seventeen	You Make My Day	Bumzu, S.Coups, Woozi, Wonwoo	Bumzu, S.Coups, Woozi, Park Ki-tae	Bumzu, Park Ki-tae	2018	
**"Home"** Korean ver. Japanese ver. ◆	Seventeen	You Made My Dawn; Power of Love	Bumzu, Woozi; Japanese ver.: Haru.Robinson	Bumzu, Woozi; Korean ver.: Seungkwan	Bumzu, Park Ki-tae	2019 (Note: The Japanese version was released in 2021.)	
**"HOME;RUN"** Korean ver. Japanese ver. ◆	Seventeen	Semicolon; Not Alone	Bumzu, Woozi; Korean ver.: Vernon, Seungkwan; Japanese ver.: Haru.Robinson	Bumzu, Woozi; Korean ver.: Nmore	Bumzu, Nmore	2020 (Note: The Japanese version was released in 2021.)	
**"HOT"** ◆	Seventeen	Face the Sun	Bumzu, Woozi, Alex Keem, Rigo Dan August, Peter Chun, Tan Tim, Praison Ploypaworawan	Bumzu, Woozi, Alex Keem, Rigo Dan August, Peter Chun, Tan Tim, Praison Ploypaworawan	—	2022	
"Hug"	Seventeen (Vocal Team)	You Made My Dawn	Woozi	Woozi, Park Ki-tae	Park Ki-tae	2019	
"I Can't Run Away"	Seventeen (Hip-Hop Team)	Attacca	Bumzu, S.Coups, Woozi‡, Wonwoo, Vernon, Mingyu	Bumzu, Woozi‡, Wonwoo, Vernon, Mingyu, Lee MinGyu	Bumzu, Lee MinGyu	2021	
"I Don't Know"	Seventeen (S.Coups × Jeonghan × Jun × Wonwoo × Woozi × Seungkwan × Vernon)	Going Seventeen	S.Coups, Woozi, Vernon	Ri Si, Woozi	Ri Si	2016	
"I Don't Understand But I Luv U"	Seventeen (Performance Team)	FML	Bumzu, Woozi‡, Dino, Hoshi	Bumzu, Nmore, Woozi‡	Bumzu, Nmore	2023	
"I Wish"	Seventeen	Heng:garæ	Bumzu, Woozi, Wonwoo, Hwang Hyun	Bumzu, Woozi, Wonwoo, Hwang Hyun	Hwang Hyun	2020	
"If I"	Seventeen (Hip-Hop Team)	Al1	S.Coups, Vernon, Mingyu	Bumzu	Bumzu	2017	
"If You Leave Me"	Seventeen	Face the Sun	Bumzu, S.Coups, Woozi, Hoshi	Bumzu, Nmore, Woozi	Bumzu, Nmore	2022	
I'll Be Back	Vernon	(single)	Vernon, Robb Roy	Vernon, My Homie Tar, 그냥민수, Robb Roy	—	2026	
"Illegal + SEVENTEEN"	PinkPantheress and Seventeen (The8 × Mingyu × Vernon)	Fancy Some More?	Vernon, Robb Roy, Victoria Beverley Walker, Richard Smith, Karl Hyde, Darren Paul Emerson, Aksel	Vernon, Robb Roy, Victoria Beverley Walker, Richard Smith, Karl Hyde, Darren Paul Emerson, Aksel	—	2025	
**"Ima -Even if the world ends tomorrow-"** (今 -明日 世界が終わっても-) ◆	Seventeen	Always Yours	Woozi, Bumzu, BARBORA	Woozi, Bumzu	Bumzu, Hwang Hyun	2023	
"Ima -Even if the world ends tomorrow-" Korean ver.	Seventeen	17 Is Right Here	Bumzu, Woozi	Bumzu, Woozi, Hwang Hyun	Bumzu, Hwang Hyun	2024	
"Imperfect love"	Seventeen (Vocal Team)	Attacca	Bumzu, Woozi	Bumzu, Woozi, Park Ki-tae	Bumzu, Woozi, Park Ki-tae, Lee Beom-hun	2021	
"Intro. New World"	Seventeen	Teen, Age	Bumzu, Woozi	Bumzu, Woozi	Bumzu	2017	
"Jam Jam"	Seventeen (Hoshi × Jun × The8 × Dino × Vernon)	17 Carat	Woozi‡, Dino, Hoshi, Vernon	Woozi‡, Cream Doughnut	Cream Doughnut	2015	
"Jungle"	Seventeen (S.Coups solo)	Happy Burstday	S.Coups	Bumzu, S.Coups	Bumzu, Building Owner	2025	
"Just Do It"	BSS	(single)	Woozi‡, Hoshi, DK, Seungkwan	Woozi‡, Won Young-heon, Dong Ne-hyeong, Min Siki	Won Young-heon, Dong Ne-hyeong, Min Siki	2018	
"JUST" (English ver.) ⁂	Bumzu	많지도 +적지도:스물일곱	Bumzu, Vernon‡, Joshua‡, G-High, L-Belle	Bumzu, Lee Ki-yong	Lee Ki-yong	2017	
"Kidult"	Seventeen	Heng:garæ	Bumzu, S.Coups, Woozi, Vernon	Bumzu, S.Coups, Woozi, Park Ki-tae	Park Ki-tae	2020	
"LALALI"	Seventeen (Hip-Hop Team)	17 Is Right Here	Bumzu, S.Coups, Woozi‡, Wonwoo, Vernon, Mingyu	Bumzu	Bumzu	2024	
**"Last night (Guitar by Park Juwon)"** ◇	JxW	This Man	Bumzu, Woozi‡	Bumzu, Woozi‡	Bumzu	2024	
"Lean On Me" Korean ver. Japanese ver.	Seventeen (Hip-Hop Team)	Going Seventeen; We Make You	Bumzu, S.Coups, Wonwoo, Vernon, Mingyu; Japanese ver.: Y.A	Bumzu	Bumzu	2016 (Note: The Japanese version was released in 2018.)	
**"Left & Right"** ◆	Seventeen	Heng:garæ	Bumzu, Woozi, Vernon	Bumzu, Woozi	Bumzu	2020	
"Leftover"	JxW (Wonwoo solo)	This Man	Bumzu, Woozi‡, Wonwoo	Bumzu, Woozi‡, Wonwoo	Bumzu, Lee Beom-hun	2024	
"Let Me Hear You Say"	Seventeen	An Ode	Bumzu, S.Coups, Woozi, Vernon, Mingyu	Bumzu, Woozi	Bumzu, Lee MinGyu	2019	
"Lie Again"	Seventeen	An Ode	Bumzu, S.Coups, Woozi, Vernon, Mingyu	Bumzu, Woozi, Simon Petrén	Simon Petrén	2019	
"Light a Flame"	Seventeen (Jun × Hoshi × Wonwoo × Woozi)	Semicolon	Bumzu, Woozi, Wonwoo, Hoshi	Bumzu, Woozi	Bumzu, Woozi	2020	
"LIKE IT"	Dino	吉BOARD (Gilboard)	Bumzu, Dino	Bumzu, Dino, Hey Farmer, Daniel Jared Upchurch, Robot Scott	—	2026	
"Lilili Yabbay"	Seventeen (Performance Team)	Teen, Age	Bumzu, Woozi‡, Dino	Bumzu, Woozi‡, Dirty Orange, Mitsu J	—	2017	
"LIMBO" Chinese ver. Korean ver.	Jun	(single)	Glenn, Jun, Jozu	Glenn, Jun, Jozu, Lee Beom-hun	Glenn, Lee Beom-hun	2022	
"Live or Die (feat. Tak of Baechigi)" ⁂	Ailee feat. Tak	A New Empire	Ailee, Woozi‡, Tak, Muwoong	Hymax, Ailee, Hong Di, Famousbro	—	2016	
"Looped Up (feat. Vernon)" ⁂	tobi lou feat. Vernon	Live on Ice	Bumzu, Vernon, Oluwatobi Adeyemi, Josh Goldenberg, Raffik Belahsene, Juan Chaves, Nate Fox, James Hamilton, Austin Marc, Maximilian Mueller, Nick Seeley, Julian-Quan Viet Le, Matteo Woods, Noah Beresin, Benaiah Mwenifumbo, William Reeves	Bumzu, Vernon, Oluwatobi Adeyemi, Josh Goldenberg, Raffik Belahsene, Juan Chaves, Nate Fox, James Hamilton, Austin Marc, Maximilian Mueller, Nick Seeley, Julian-Quan Viet Le, Matteo Woods, Noah Beresin, Benaiah Mwenifumbo, William Reeves	—	2019	
Lotto	Vernon feat. Don Mills	(single)	Don Mills, Vernon	Gonzo	Gonzo	2015	
"Love Letter" Korean ver. Japanese ver.	Seventeen	First 'Love&Letter'; We Make You	S.Coups, Woozi, Wonwoo, Vernon, Mingyu; Japanese ver.: Y.A	Woozi, Won Young-heon, Dong Ne-hyeong	Won Young-heon; Korean ver.: Dong Ne-hyeong, Min Siki; Japanese ver.: Noh Hyun, Choi Min-suk	2016 (Note: The Japanese version was released in 2018.)	
**"LOVE, MONEY, FAME (feat. DJ Khaled)"** ◆	Seventeen feat. DJ Khaled	Spill the Feels	Bumzu, Woozi, Vernon, Robb Roy	Bumzu, Woozi, Park Ki-tae, Daniel Klein, Charli Taft, Rudi Daouk, Jakob Mihoubi, Carlyle Fernandes, DJ Khaled	—	2024	
"LOVE, MONEY, FAME (feat. DJ Khaled)" (English ver.)	Seventeen feat. DJ Khaled	LOVE, MONEY, FAME (Remixes)	Bumzu, Woozi, Vernon, Shannon Bae, Robb Roy	Bumzu, Woozi, Park Ki-tae, Daniel Klein, Charli Taft, Rudi Daouk, Jakob Mihoubi, Carlyle Fernandes, DJ Khaled	—	2024	
"LOVE, MONEY, FAME (feat. DJ Khaled)" (Kenia OS Remix)	Seventeen feat. DJ Khaled and Kenia OS	(single)	Bumzu, Woozi, Vernon, Shannon Bae, Robb Roy, Mechi Pieretti, Kenia OS	Bumzu, Woozi, Park Ki-tae, Daniel Klein, Charli Taft, Rudi Daouk, Jakob Mihoubi, Carlyle Fernandes, DJ Khaled	—	2024	
"LOVE, MONEY, FAME (feat. DJ Khaled)" (Timbaland Remix)	Seventeen, DJ Khaled and Timbaland	(single)	Bumzu, Woozi, Vernon, Shannon Bae, Robb Roy, Axel Leon	Bumzu, Woozi, Park Ki-tae, Daniel Klein, Charli Taft, Rudi Daouk, Jakob Mihoubi, Carlyle Fernandes, DJ Khaled, Timbaland, Cristian Colon	—	2024	
"Love RumPumPum" ⁂	fromis_9	Fun Factory	Bumzu, Woozi‡	Bumzu, Lee Ki-yong, Woozi‡, Park Ki-tae	Bumzu, Lee Ki-yong, Woozi‡, Park Ki-tae	2019	
"Love Sick (narr. Lee Moon Sae)"	Picheolin	吉BOARD (Gilboard)	Bumzu, Jung Mi-seon, Dino	Bumzu, Willius, Dino	Willius	2026	
"Love Song"	BSS	Teleparty	Bumzu, Woozi‡, Hoshi, DK, Seungkwan	Bumzu, Woozi‡	Bumzu, BuildingOwner	2025	
"Lucky"	Seventeen	An Ode	Bumzu, Woozi, Vernon, Mingyu, Seungkwan	Bumzu, Lee KiYong, Woozi, G-High	Lee KiYong, G-High	2019	
"LUNCH"	BSS	Second Wind	Bumzu, Woozi‡, Hoshi, DK, Seungkwan	Willie Weeks, Kyler Niko	—	2023	
**"MAESTRO"** Korean ver. Japanese ver. ◆	Seventeen	17 Is Right Here; Shohikigen	Bumzu, Woozi; Japanese ver.: BARBORA	Bumzu, Woozi, Yeom Dong-geon, Andreas Oberg, Gabriel Brandes, Ninos Hanna, Niklas Jarelius Persson, William Segerdahl, Justin Starling, Maya Rose	—	2024	
"MAESTRO" (Orchestra Remix)	Seventeen	(single)	Bumzu, Woozi	Bumzu, Woozi, Yeom Dong-geon, Andreas Oberg, Gabriel Brandes, Ninos Hanna, Niklas Jarelius Persson, William Segerdahl, Justin Starling, Maya Rose	Park Ki-tae, Lee Beom-hun	2024	
**"Mansae"** ◆	Seventeen	Boys Be	Bumzu, S.Coups, Woozi, Wonwoo, Vernon, Mingyu	Bumzu, Woozi	—	2015	
"Mansae" (Hip-Hop Team ver.)	Seventeen (Hip-Hop Team)	First 'Love&Letter'	Bumzu, S.Coups, Woozi‡, Wonwoo, Vernon, Mingyu	Bumzu, S.Coups, Woozi‡, Vernon	Bumzu	2016	
"March"	Seventeen	Face the Sun	Bumzu, Woozi	Bumzu, Woozi, Park Ki-tae	Bumzu, Park Ki-tae	2022	
"Mi-cheo Mi-cheo"	Picheolin	吉BOARD (Gilboard)	Bumzu, Dino, KIKI	Bumzu, Building Owner, Willius, Dino, KIKI	Bumzu, Building Owner, Willius	2026	
"mia"	V8 (Vernon solo)	V8	Vernon, Han Jung-in, Robb Roy	Vernon, Kirara, Han Jung-in, Robb Roy	—	2026	
Miss You (feat. Vernon & KM) ⁂	(sic)boy feat. Vernon and KM	Hollow	Vernon, Robb Roy, (sic)boy	Vernon, Robb Roy, KM, (sic)boy	—	2023	
"Monster"	Seventeen (Hip-Hop Team)	Seventeenth Heaven	Bumzu, S.Coups, Woozi‡, Wonwoo, Vernon, Mingyu	Bumzu, Vernon	Bumzu	2023	
"Moonwalker"	Seventeen (Performance Team)	You Make My Day	Bumzu, Woozi‡, Dino, Hoshi	Bumzu, Woozi‡, Park Ki-tae	Park Ki-tae	2018	
"MY I"	Seventeen (Jun × The8)	Al1	Bumzu, Jun, The8	Bumzu, Woozi‡	Bumzu	2017	
"My My"	Seventeen	Heng:garæ	Bumzu, S.Coups, Woozi, Vernon	Bumzu, Woozi, Vernon	Bumzu, Woozi, Park Ki-tae	2020	
"Network Love"	Seventeen (Joshua × Jun × The8 × Vernon)	An Ode	Bumzu, Woozi‡, Vernon, The8	Bumzu, Nmore, Woozi‡, Park Ki-tae	Nmore, Park Ki-tae	2019	
"NO F.U.N"	Seventeen	Love & Letter	S.Coups, Woozi, Wonwoo, Dino, Hoshi, Vernon, Seungkwan	Woozi, Eartattack	Eartattack	2016	
**"Not Alone"** (ひとりじゃない) ◆	Seventeen	(single)	Woozi, Bumzu, Haru.Robinson	Woozi, Bumzu, Park Ki-tae	Park Ki-tae	2021	
"Not Alone" Korean ver.	Seventeen	17 Is Right Here	Bumzu, Woozi	Bumzu, Woozi, Park Ki-tae	Park Ki-tae	2024	
**"Oh My!"** Korean ver. Japanese ver. ◆	Seventeen	You Make My Day; Happy Ending	Bumzu, S.Coups, Woozi, Vernon; Japanese ver.: Haru.Robinson	Bumzu, Woozi	Bumzu, Park Ki-tae	2018 (Note: The Japanese version was released in 2019.)	
"Oh My!" Chinese ver.	Seventeen	(single)	Bumzu, S.Coups, Woozi, Vernon, The8	Bumzu, Woozi	Bumzu, Park Ki-tae	2018	
"OMG"	Seventeen (Performance Team)	Boys Be	Woozi‡, Dino	Woozi‡, Won Young-heon, Dong Ne-hyeong	Won Young-heon, Dong Ne-hyeong	2015	
**"Orbit (轨道) (feat. JinJiBeWater_隼)"** ◇	The8 feat. JinJiBeWater_隼	Stardust	Vernon‡, The8, Robb Roy, JinJiBeWater_隼	Vernon‡, NicolKeem, Robb Roy, Numbernine, JinJiBeWater_隼	NicolKeem, Numbernine	2024	
"Our Dawn Is Hotter Than Day"	Seventeen	You Make My Day	Bumzu, S.Coups, Woozi, Wonwoo, Vernon, Mingyu	Bumzu, Lee KiYong, Woozi	Bumzu, Lee KiYong	2018	
"Outro. 未完"	Seventeen	Teen, Age	—	Bumzu, Woozi, Park Ki-tae	Bumzu, Park Ki-tae	2017	
"PANG!"	Seventeen (Performance Team)	Attacca	Bumzu, Woozi‡, Dino, Hoshi	Bumzu, Pop Time, Woozi‡, Dino, Kim Sung-ho, Lee Seung-pil	Bumzu, Pop Time, Kim Sung-ho, Lee Seung-pil	2021	
**"Party Rock Rock (prod. Hitchhiker)"** ◇	Picheolin	吉BOARD (Gilboard)	Bumzu, Dino, Kim Bu-min	Bumzu, Dino, Hitchhiker, Kim Bu-min	Bumzu, Hitchhiker	2026	
"PINOCCHIO (feat. So!YoON!)"	HxW feat. So!YoON!	Beam	Bumzu, Woozi, Hoshi, Jimmy Burney II, David Brook, Jintae Ko	Bumzu, BuildingOwner, Woozi	Bumzu, BuildingOwner	2025	
"Pinwheel" Korean ver. Japanese ver.	Seventeen (Vocal Team)	Teen, Age; 24H	Woozi; Japanese ver.: BARBORA	Woozi, Won Young-heon; Korean ver.: Dong Ne-hyeong; Japanese ver.: Noh Hyun	Won Young-heon; Korean ver.: Dong Ne-hyeong; Japanese ver.: Noh Hyun	2017 (Note: The Japanese version was released in 2020.)	
**"Power of Love"** (あいのちから) ◆	Seventeen	(single)	Woozi, Bumzu, BARBORA	Woozi, Bumzu, Nmore	Nmore	2021	
"Power of Love" Korean ver.	Seventeen	17 Is Right Here	Bumzu, Woozi	Bumzu, Nmore, Woozi	Nmore	2024	
"Prelude of Love"	DxS	Serenade	DK, Seungkwan, Kang Eun-jeong, Lee O Neul	Hautboi Rich, Nickko Young, Antti Oikarinen, Etham Basden	—	2026	
**"Pretty U"** ◆	Seventeen	First 'Love&Letter'	Bumzu, S.Coups, Woozi, Vernon, Seungkwan	Bumzu, Woozi, Won Young-heon, Dong Ne-hyeong	Bumzu, Woozi, Won Young-heon, Dong Ne-hyeong	2016	
"PSYCHO"	Jun	(single)	Glenn, Jun	Glenn, BuildingOwner, Jun	BuildingOwner	2023	
"Q&A" ◆	Seventeen and Ailee (S.Coups × Woozi × Vernon)	(single)	S.Coups, Woozi, Vernon	Ri Si, Woozi	Ri Si	2015	
"Rain"	Seventeen (Performance Team)	Spill the Feels	Bumzu, Woozi‡, Dino, Hoshi	Bumzu, Woozi‡	Bumzu, Park Ki-tae, Ohway!	2024	
"Raindrops"	Seventeen (Seungkwan solo)	Happy Burstday	Seungkwan, Ha Hyun-sang	Seungkwan, Ha Hyun-sang	Shin Seung-ik	2025	
"rat race"	V8	V8	Vernon, The8, Robb Roy, Jake Torrey, Gao Longyu	Vernon, The8, Will Not Fear, Rhode, Robb Roy, Lodge Boy, Jake Torrey, Gao Longyu, Dylan Brady, UHD	—	2026	
**"Ready to love"** ◆	Seventeen	Your Choice	Bumzu, danke, S.Coups, Woozi, Mingyu, "hitman" Bang, Kyler Niko	Bumzu, Woozi, "hitman" Bang, Wonderkid, Kyler Niko, Christoffer Semelius, H. Kenneth	—	2021	
"Rock"	Seventeen	Boys Be	S.Coups, Woozi, Wonwoo, Vernon	Woozi, Won Young-heon, Dong Ne-hyeong	Won Young-heon, Dong Ne-hyeong	2015	
**"Rock with you"** Korean ver. Japanese ver. ◆	Seventeen	Attacca; Dream	Bumzu, Woozi, Vernon; Korean ver.: Kim In-hyeong, Joshua, Tim Tan, Jordan Witzigreuter, Cameron Walker; Japanese ver.: BARBORA	Bumzu, Woozi, Josh McClelland; Korean ver.: Tim Tan, Jordan Witzigreuter, Cameron Walker, Matt Terry	—	2021 (Note: The Japanese version was released in 2022.)	
"ROCKET"	Seventeen (Joshua × Vernon)	Teen, Age	Woozi‡, Vernon, Nathan, Joshua	Bumzu, Woozi‡, Vernon, Nathan	Bumzu, Nathan	2017	
"Rockstar"	DxS (DK solo)	Serenade	danke, eyan, Bang Hye-hyun, Kang Eun-jung, DK, Jozu, Lee Beom-hun	Lee Beom-hun, DK, Jozu	Lee Beom-hun	2026	
"Ruby"	Woozi	(single)	Bumzu, Woozi, Shannon Bae	Bumzu, BuildingOwner, Woozi, Park Ki-tae	Bumzu, BuildingOwner, Woozi, Park Ki-tae	2022	
"Run to You" Korean ver. Japanese ver.	Seventeen	Director's Cut; Not Alone	Bumzu, Woozi; Japanese ver.: BARBORA	Bumzu, Woozi; Korean ver.: Park Ki-tae	Bumzu, Park Ki-tae	2018 (Note: The Japanese version was released in 2021.)	
"Same dream, same mind, same night"	Seventeen (Vocal Team)	Your Choice	Bumzu, Woozi	Bumzu, Woozi, Park Ki-tae	Bumzu, Park Ki-tae	2021	
"Sara Sara" ◆	Seventeen	Always Yours	Woozi, Bumzu, BARBORA	Woozi, Bumzu	Bumzu, Ohway!	2023	
"Say Yes"	Seventeen (DK × Seungkwan)	First 'Love&Letter'	Woozi‡, DK, Seungkwan, Kiggen	Kiggen	Kiggen	2016	
"Second Life"	Seventeen (Vocal Team)	An Ode	Bumzu, Woozi	Bumzu, Woozi, Vernon‡	Bumzu	2019	
"Shadow"	Seventeen	Face the Sun	Bumzu, Woozi, Dino, Gabriel Brandes, Matthew Thomson, Max Graham, Ryan Lawrie, Johan Fransson	Bumzu, Woozi, Dino, Gabriel Brandes, Matthew Thomson, Max Graham, Ryan Lawrie, Johan Fransson	—	2022	
"Shake It Off"	Seventeen (Mingyu solo)	Happy Burstday	Mingyu, Shannon Bae, Samuel Arredondo	Mingyu, IOAH	—	2025	
"Shhh"	Seventeen (Performance Team)	You Made My Dawn	Bumzu, Dino, Hoshi	Bumzu, Lee KiYong	Bumzu, Lee KiYong	2019	
"Shining Diamond"	Seventeen	17 Carat	Kim Min-jung, S.Coups, Woozi, Vernon	Ri Si, Woozi, Masterkey	Park Ki-tae	2015	
"Shining Diamond" (Performance Team ver.)	Seventeen (Performance Team)	First 'Love&Letter'	Kim Min-jung, S.Coups‡, Woozi‡, Vernon‡	Ri Si, Woozi‡, Masterkey	Park Ki-tae	2016	
"Shining Star"	Seventeen (Vernon solo)	Happy Burstday	Vernon, Robb Roy	Robb Roy, Numbernine, Virgin Kim, Reiji Okamoto	Numbernine, Virgin Kim, Park Sejun	2025	
**"Shohikigen"** (消費期限) ◆	Seventeen	(single)	Woozi, Bumzu, BARBORA	Bumzu, Woozi, Park Ki-tae	Bumzu, Park Ki-tae, Nmore	2024	
Sickness (feat. Pledis Girlz)	Vernon feat. Pledis Girlz	Love Revolution (webtoon soundtrack)	Vernon	Shin Dong-hwi	Shin Dong-hwi	2016	
"Side By Side" Chinese ver. Korean ver.	The8	(single)	Bumzu, The8; Chinese ver.: Dong Le (Doller)	Bumzu, The8, Bir$day	Bumzu, Bir$day	2021	
"SIMPLE"	Seventeen (Woozi solo)	Love & Letter	Woozi	Woozi, Won Young-heon, Dong Ne-hyeong, Choi Min-sik	Won Young-heon, Dong Ne-hyeong, Choi Min-sik	2016	
"Sincerely (prod. Lee Hyun Do of DEUX)"	Picheolin	吉BOARD (Gilboard)	Bumzu, Dino	Bumzu, Building Owner, Willius, Dino, Lee Hyun-do	Bumzu, Building Owner, Willius, Lee Hyun-do	2026	
**singasong** ◇	V8	V8	Vernon, The8, Robb Roy	Vernon, The8, Robb Roy, Emir Timur Tokdemir	—	2026	
"Skyfall"	Seventeen (The8 solo)	Happy Burstday	Vernon‡, The8, Robb Roy	The8, Nicolkeem, Robb Roy, Numbernine	Nicolkeem, Numbernine	2025	
"Smile Flower" Korean ver. Japanese ver.	Seventeen	Going Seventeen; Fallin' Flower	Woozi; Japanese ver.: Haru.Robinson	Woozi, Won Young-heon; Korean ver.: Bae Jin-pyo, Dong Ne-hyeong; Japanese ver.: Noh Hyun	Won Young-heon; Korean ver.: Bae Jin-pyo, Dong Ne-hyeong; Japanese ver.: Noh Hyun	2016 (Note: The Japanese version was released in 2020.)	
"Snap Shoot" Korean ver. Japanese ver.	Seventeen	An Ode; Power of Love	Bumzu, Woozi; Korean ver.: S.Coups, Vernon, Mingyu; Japanese ver.: BARBORA	Bumzu, Woozi	Bumzu; Korean ver.: Lee MinGyu; Japanese ver.: Ohway!	2019 (Note: The Japanese version was released in 2021.)	
"SNAPBACK"	Hoshi	(single)	Jin Jeon, Hoshi, salem ilese, JT Roach, Benjamin Boukris	Jin Jeon, Hoshi, salem ilese, JT Roach, Benjamin Boukris	—	2026	
"SOS (Prod. Marshmello)"	Seventeen	Seventeenth Heaven	Bumzu, Woozi, Shannon Bae	Bumzu, Woozi, Marshmello	—	2023	
"Space"	Seventeen (S.Coups × Wonwoo × DK × Mingyu × Vernon)	Love & Letter	Bumzu, S.Coups, Wonwoo, Vernon, Mingyu	Bumzu	Bumzu	2016	
"Spell"	Seventeen (Performance Team)	17 Is Right Here	Bumzu, Woozi‡, Dino, The8	Bumzu, Woozi‡	Bumzu	2024	
"Spider"	Hoshi	(single)	Bumzu, Woozi‡, Hoshi	Woozi‡, Park Ki-tae	Park Ki-tae	2021	
"Still Lonely"	Seventeen (Jun × Hoshi × Wonwoo × Woozi × DK × Vernon × Dino)	First 'Love&Letter'	Woozi, Wonwoo, Hoshi, Vernon, Seungkwan‡	Woozi, Lee Hyun-do, Kim Jin-hwan	Lee Hyun-do, Kim Jin-hwan	2016	
"STUPID IDIOT"	HxW	Beam	Bumzu, Woozi, Hoshi, Pink Slip	Bumzu, Woozi, Hoshi, Pink Slip	—	2025	
**"Super"** ◆	Seventeen	FML	Bumzu, S.Coups, Woozi, Vernon	Bumzu, Woozi, August Rigo	—	2023	
"Super" (Workout Remix)	Seventeen	(single)	Bumzu, S.Coups, Woozi, Vernon	Bumzu, Woozi, August Rigo	Park Ki-tae	2024	
"Swimming Fool"	Seventeen (Performance Team)	Al1	Bumzu, Woozi‡, Dino, Vernon‡	Bumzu, Woozi‡, Hoshi	Bumzu	2017	
"TAKE A SHOT"	Hoshi	(single)	Hoshi, FAIELO, DEN, Hardy, Bae Jin-seok, JungHun, ONEHUNNNIT	FAIELO, DEN, Hardy, Bae Jin-seok, JungHun	FAIELO, DEN, Bae Jin-seok	2025	
**"Thanks"** ◆	Seventeen	Director's Cut	Bumzu, Woozi, Hoshi	Bumzu, Woozi	Bumzu, Park Ki-tae	2018	
"Thanksful for You" ⁂	NU'EST W (Baekho solo)	W, Here	Woozi‡	YamaArt, Woozi‡, Won Young-heon, Dong Ne-hyeong	YamaArt, Won Young-heon, Dong Ne-hyeong	2017	
"The Meaning of Meeting" (相遇的意义)	Seventeen	(single)	Bumzu, Woozi	Bumzu, Woozi	Bumzu, Park Ki-tae, Lee Beom-hun	2024	
"Thinkin' About You"	Seventeen	Director's Cut	Bumzu, S.Coups, Woozi, Wonwoo, Vernon	Bumzu, Woozi, Park Ki-tae	Bumzu, Park Ki-tae	2018	
**"THUNDER"** ◆	Seventeen	Happy Burstday	Bumzu, Woozi	Bumzu, S.Coups, Woozi	Bumzu	2025	
"Tiny Light"	Seventeen	BEASTARS FINAL SEASON Part 2 (soundtrack)	Woozi, Shannon Bae	Woozi, Nmore	Woozi, Nmore	2026	
"To you"	Seventeen	Attacca	Bumzu, Woozi	Bumzu, Woozi, Park Ki-tae	Park Ki-tae	2021	
"Together" Korean ver. Japanese ver.	Seventeen	Heng:garæ; 24H	Bumzu, Woozi; Korean ver.: S.Coups, Hoshi, Mingyu; Japanese ver.: BARBORA	Bumzu, Woozi; Korean ver.: Park Ki-tae	Bumzu, Park Ki-tae; Korean ver.: Nmore	2020	
"TRAUMA"	Seventeen (Hip-Hop Team)	Teen, Age	S.Coups, Wonwoo, Vernon, Mingyu	Bumzu, Vernon	Bumzu	2017	
"Trigger"	Seventeen (Dino solo)	Happy Burstday	Dino	GHSTLOOP, Pdogg, Ninos Hanna, William Segerdahl, Count Baldor, Brad Loughead	—	2025	
**"Very Nice"** ◆	Seventeen	Love & Letter	Bumzu, S.Coups, Woozi, Vernon	Bumzu, Woozi	Bumzu	2016	
"Wait"	Dino	(single)	Woozi‡, Dino	Woozi‡, Dino, Ohway!	Woozi‡, Ohway!	2023	
"Water"	Seventeen (Hip-Hop Team)	Spill the Feels	Bumzu, S.Coups, Wonwoo, Vernon, Mingyu	Bumzu, Vernon, Mingyu	Bumzu	2024	
"Wave"	Seventeen (Performance Team)	Your Choice	Bumzu, Woozi‡, Dino, Hoshi, Jun, The8	Bumzu, Lee KiYong, Woozi‡	Bumzu, Lee KiYong	2021	
"What Kind of Future"	Woozi	(single)	Woozi	Bae Jin-pyo, Woozi, Won Young-heon, Dong Ne-hyeong	Bae Jin-pyo, Woozi, Won Young-heon, Dong Ne-hyeong	2024	
"What's Good"	Seventeen (Hip-Hop Team)	You Make My Day	S.Coups, Wonwoo, Vernon, Mingyu	Bumzu	Bumzu, Lee KiYong	2018	
"When I Grow Up"	Seventeen (Vocal Team)	Boys Be	Woozi	Woozi, Won Young-heon, Dong Ne-hyeong	Won Young-heon, Dong Ne-hyeong	2015	
"Where love passed" (愛が通り過ぎた跡)	Seventeen	Hatsukoi DOGs (soundtrack)	Woozi	Woozi, BuildingOwner	BuildingOwner	2025	
"WHO"	Seventeen (Performance Team)	Al1	Dino, Hoshi	Woozi‡, Won Young-heon, Dong Ne-hyeong	Won Young-heon, Dong Ne-hyeong	2017	
"Without You"	Seventeen	Teen, Age	Bumzu, S.Coups, Woozi, Dino, Hoshi, Vernon, Mingyu, DK, The8, Jeonghan	Bumzu, Woozi, Park Ki-tae	Bumzu, Park Ki-tae	2017	
**"_WORLD"** ◆	Seventeen	Sector 17	Bumzu, S.Coups, Woozi, Vernon, Melanie Joy Fontana, Lindgren	Bumzu, Woozi, Vernon, Melanie Joy Fontana, Lindgren, Steven Franks, Thomas Brown	—	2022	
"_WORLD (Feat. Anne-Marie)"	Seventeen feat. Anne-Marie	(single)	Bumzu, S.Coups, Woozi, Vernon, Melanie Fontana, Michel Schulz, Anne-Marie Nicholson	Bumzu, Woozi, Vernon, Melanie Fontana, Michel Schulz, Steven Franks, Thomas Brown, Anne-Marie Nicholson	—	2022	
"Worth it"	CxM	Hype Vibes	Bumzu, S.Coups, Mingyu	Bumzu, S.Coups, Mingyu, Shannon Bae, Hey Farmer, Zingo, James Lavigne, Jintae Ko, Tiina Vainikainen	—	2025	
"Wrecker (feat. Vernon of Seventeen)" ⁂	Omega Sapien feat. Vernon	Wuga	Vernon, Omega Sapien, Harry Rodrigues	Vernon, Omega Sapien, Harry Rodrigues	—	2022	
"Yawn"	Seventeen (Vocal Team)	Seventeenth Heaven	Woozi	Bumzu, Woozi	Bumzu, Lee Beom-hun	2023	
"You in My Imagination" ⁂ (상상 속의 너)	Raina and Lizzy	Two Yoo Project – Sugar Man Part 13 (soundtrack)	Kim Chang-hwan	Kim Chang-hwan	Bumzu, Woozi‡	2016	
"Young again"	CxM	Hype Vibes	Bumzu, S.Coups, Mingyu, Melanie Fontana, Michel Schulz, GG Ramirez, Jack Samson	S.Coups, Mingyu, Hautboi Rich, Melanie Fontana, Michel Schulz, GG Ramirez, Jack Samson	—	2025	
"ZZAN"	Picheolin feat. Dino	吉BOARD (Gilboard)	Bumzu, Dino	Bumzu, Hey Farmer	Bumzu, Willius, Hey Farmer	2026	

== Other registered songs written by Seventeen members ==
This section lists KOMCA-registered compositions that have not been issued as formal commercially distributed audio releases.

0–9 · B · D · E · F · H · I · J · L · M · N · S · T · U · W · Y

Other registered songs written by Seventeen members
Song	Artist(s)	Album / program	Lyrics	Composition	Arrangement	Year	Ref.
"0 (ZERO)"	Dino		Bumzu, Dino	Bumzu, Dino	—	2017	
"Bands Boy"	Vernon		Vernon	Vernon, Cribs 1, Cribs 2	Cribs 1, Cribs 2	2021	
"Dream" Korean ver. Japanese ver.	Jeonghan		Glenn, Jeonghan; Japanese ver.: Haru.Robinson	Glenn, Nmore, Jeonghan	Nmore	2021	
"Encircled" (동그라미)	Seventeen		S.Coups, Woozi, Wonwoo, Dino, Hoshi, Vernon, Mingyu, DK, Seungkwan, Jun, The8, Joshua	Woozi, Kim Min-hyeok, Zingo	Woozi, Zingo	2025	
"FEEL"	CxM		Bumzu, S.Coups, Mingyu, K Corey	Mingyu, K Corey	—	2026	
"Hai Cheng" (꿈걸음) Korean ver.	The8		Woozi‡, The8	Woozi‡, The8, Lee Beom-hun	Lee Beom-hun	2022	
"High-Five"	Dino		Dino	Dino, Hey Farmer	Hey Farmer	2022	
"Hurricane"	Seventeen (Hoshi solo)	2017 Seventeen 1st World Tour Diamond Edge in Seoul	Woozi‡, Hoshi	Woozi‡, Won Young-heon, Dong Ne-hyeong	Won Young-heon, Dong Ne-hyeong, Min Siki	2018	
"I Want You Back"	Hoshi		Hoshi, Shannon Bae	Hoshi, Shannon Bae, Bir$day	Bir$day	2025	
"Joker"	Seventeen (Hip-Hop Team)	2017 Seventeen 1st World Tour Diamond Edge in Seoul	S.Coups, Wonwoo, Vernon, Mingyu	Bumzu	—	2018	
"Last Order"	Seventeen (Dino solo)	2021 Seventeen Concert [Power of Love]	Dino	Bumzu, Building Owner, Dino	—	2021	
"Like the Beginning" (시작처럼)	Mingyu		Woozi‡	Bae Jin-pyo, Woozi‡, Won Young-heon, Dong Ne-hyeong	Bae Jin-pyo, Won Young-heon, Dong Ne-hyeong	2025	
"Me" (난)	S.Coups		Bumzu, S.Coups	Bumzu, S.Coups	Bumzu, Ohway!	2023	
"MMO"	Seventeen (Hip-Hop Team)	2017 Seventeen 1st World Tour Diamond Edge in Seoul	S.Coups, Wonwoo, Vernon, Mingyu	Bumzu	—	2018	
"NANA TOUR Logo Song"	Seventeen		Woozi, DK	Woozi, DK	Woozi, Lee Beom-hun	2024	
"STAY"	Hoshi		Glenn, Hoshi	Glenn, Nmore, Hoshi	Nmore	2023	
"The Real Thing"	Seventeen (Dino solo)	2017 Seventeen 1st World Tour Diamond Edge in Seoul	Dino	Bumzu	—	2018	
"Tiger (feat. Tiger JK)"	Hoshi feat. Tiger JK		Woozi‡, Hoshi, Tiger JK	Woozi‡, Won Young-heon, Dong Ne-hyeong, Min Siki	Won Young-heon, Dong Ne-hyeong, Min Siki	2022	
"Tiger Power" (호랑이 Power)	Hoshi		Bumzu, Glenn, Hoshi	Bumzu, Hoshi	Bumzu	2021	
"Too Young to Die"	S.Coups		Bumzu, S.Coups	Bumzu, S.Coups	—	2026	
"Touch"	Seventeen (Hoshi solo)		Woozi‡, Hoshi	Woozi‡, Won Young-heon, Dong Ne-hyeong, Min Siki	Won Young-heon, Dong Ne-hyeong, Min Siki	2025	
"Un Haeng Il Chi" (言行一致)	Seventeen (Hip-Hop Team)	2017 Seventeen 1st World Tour Diamond Edge in Seoul	Bumzu, S.Coups, Wonwoo, Vernon, Mingyu	Bumzu	—	2018	
"Us, Again" (우리, 다시)	Seventeen		Bumzu, Woozi, Jang Young-mi	Bumzu, Nmore, Woozi	—	2020	
"We gonna make it shine" (2017 ver.)	Seventeen (Vocal Team)	2017 Seventeen 1st World Tour Diamond Edge in Seoul	Bumzu, Woozi, DK, Seungkwan, Jeonghan, Joshua	Bumzu, Woozi	—	2018	
"What's the Problem"	Seventeen (Hip-Hop Team)	2017 Seventeen 1st World Tour Diamond Edge in Seoul	S.Coups, Wonwoo, Vernon, Mingyu	Bumzu	—	2018	
"WITH ME"	Seventeen (Woozi solo)	2017 Seventeen 1st World Tour Diamond Edge in Seoul	Woozi	Bumzu, Woozi	Bumzu	2018	
"You're My Christmas"	DK		DK, Jozu, Lee Beom-hun	DK, Jozu, Lee Beom-hun	Lee Beom-hun	2021	

== Songs recorded by Seventeen without member songwriting credits ==
0–9 · A · B · C · D · E · F · G · H · I · K · L · M · N · O · P · R · S · T · W · Y

Songs recorded by Seventeen without member songwriting credits
Song	Artist(s)	Album / release	Lyrics	Composition	Arrangement	Year	Ref.
"17 (feat. Seventeen)" ⁂	Pink Sweat$ feat. Seventeen (Joshua × DK)	(single)	David Bowden, John Hill	David Bowden, John Hill	—	2020	
"A Bite of Summer"	The8	(single)	Fozik	Fozik	Zeng Wuqiujie	2022	
"As It Was" (Spotify Singles)	Seungkwan	Spotify Singles	Harry Styles, Kid Harpoon, Tyler Johnson	Harry Styles, Kid Harpoon, Tyler Johnson	—	2022	
"Bad Influence (Prod. by Pharrell Williams)"	Seventeen	Happy Burstday	Pharrell Williams	Pharrell Williams	—	2025	
"Best Scene"	DK	Curtain Up, Class OST Part 5 (soundtrack)	Lee Ki-hwan, Mun Ssi	Lee Ki-hwan, Mun Ssi, CONA	Lee Ki-hwan, Mun Ssi, CONA	2026	
"Better Half (feat. Omoinotake)"	Jeonghan feat. Omoinotake	(single)	Tomoaki Fukushima, Jo Yoon-kyung	Leo Fujii	Omoinotake	2025	
"Better Half (feat. Jeonghan of Seventeen)" Japanese ver. ⁂	Omoinotake feat. Jeonghan	Pieces	Tomoaki Fukushima	Leo Fujii	Omoinotake	2025	
"Beyond the Dream"	Dino	Dream to You OST Part 1 (soundtrack)	HANA., Jay Lee	Jay Lee, Jaymond	Jay Lee	2026	
**"Blue"** ◇	DxS	Serenade	Lee O Neul	Joseph K (THE HUB), Will Jay, Sam Creighton	—	2026	
"Brothers for One Time"	Jun and The8	Seven Days OST (soundtrack)	Zhou Jieying	Liu Hancong	Ganhu	2019	
"Burning Moon"	Jun	The Vendetta of An OST (soundtrack)	Zheng Zhihuan, Hao Dongdong	Huang Rongzhu	—	2025	
"Chocolate" ◆	Yoon Jong-shin with Seventeen (Vocal Team)	(single)	Yoon Jong-shin	Yoon Jong-shin, Lee Geun-ho	Postino	2016	
"Cinematic Love"	Yang Da-il and DK	(single)	XEPY	XEPY, MasterKey, Du Ri	MasterKey	2017	
"Crow"	Jun	Silent Boarding Gate	Guo Qiuwei	Peng Jincheng	Peng Jincheng	2021	
"Destiny"	Seventeen (Woozi solo)	Happy Burstday	Bumzu	Bumzu, Park Ki-tae	Bumzu, Park Ki-tae	2025	
"Die Schatten Werden Länger" ⁂	Kai and DK	KAI ON MUSICAL	Michael Kunze	Sylvester Levay	—	2022	
"Dirty Dancing (feat. Joshua, DK & Dino of Seventeen)" (Dem Jointz Remix) ⁂	New Kids on the Block feat. Seventeen (Joshua × DK × Dino)	The Block Revisited	RedOne, Donnie Wahlberg, Joaquin Bynum	RedOne, Donnie Wahlberg, Joaquin Bynum	—	2023	
"Dream" Chinese ver.	Jun	The King: Eternal Monarch OST (soundtrack)	Gaemi, Kim Se-jin, Paul Kim; Chinese ver.: Guo Ting	Gaemi, Paul Kim	Heo Sung-jin, Lee Hwa	2020	
"Drained"	DxS	Drained	Choi Yu-ri	Choi Yu-ri	Moon Ji-hyeok	2026	
"Ear"	Joshua	Ear	Wen Jiong	Zheng Yujie	Huang Zijian @ Brownie	2026	
"Exclusive Fairytale"	Jun	Exclusive Fairytale OST (soundtrack)	Zhang Peng Peng	Dong Jiahong	—	2023	
"Fallen Superstar"	Hoshi	(single)	JXDN	Andrew Goldstein	—	2025	
"Fly! Birdy Friends" Korean ver.	The8	Fly! Birdy Friends (Original Soundtrack) (soundtrack)	Kim Yuseok, Kim Jaehwan, Park Seori	Kim Yuseok, Kim Jaehwan	Kim Yuseok, Kim Jaehwan	2024	
"Fly! Birdy Friends" Chinese ver.	The8	Fly! Birdy Friends (Original Soundtrack) (soundtrack)	Kim Yuseok, Kim Jaehwan, Park Seori	Kim Yuseok, Kim Jaehwan	Kim Yuseok, Kim Jaehwan	2024	
"Goddess of Despair"	Hoshi	(single)	Kanon	Go Shiina	Go Shiina	2024	
"Go"	Seungkwan	Record of Youth OST Part 1 (soundtrack)	Nam Hye-seung, Surf Green	Nam Hye-seung, Surf Green	Nam Hye-seung, Surf Green	2020	
"Go!"	DK	Twenty-Five Twenty-One OST Part 5 (soundtrack)	The O	The O	The O	2022	
"Good Day 2025 (Telepathy + By the Moonlight Window)"	Good Day cast (BSS)	Good Day 2025	Kim Chang-nam	Kim Chang-nam	IDO, Dominsuk	2025	
"Guilty Pleasure"	DxS	Serenade	Ahn Nayeon, danke	HUMBLER, Rokman, CELOTRON	—	2026	
"How Can Love Be Like That"	Seungkwan and Lee Ji-yong	Duet Song Festival Episode 11	Lee Seung-hwan	Lee Seung-hwan, Hwang Sung-je	Bumzu, Lee Ki-yong, Jo Ja-young	2016	
"Hide"	The8	Who Is the Murderer OST (soundtrack)	He Jiale	He Jiale	Yang Zixuan	2021	
"ICARUS"	Dino	Castaway Diva OST Part 3 (soundtrack)	Taibian	Taibian, CHKmate	Taibian, CHKmate	2023	
"Is It Still Beautiful"	Seventeen (Woozi × DK × Seungkwan)	Hospital Playlist 2 OST Part 8 (soundtrack)	Yoo Hee-yeol	Yoo Hee-yeol	Jung Gu-hyeon	2021	
"It's You"	DK	Resident Playbook OST Part 7 (soundtrack)	MaO	Dailog, HEN	Dailog	2025	
"Kids Are Born Stars" (Apple Music Home Session)	Joshua	Apple Music Home Session: JOSHUA	Ari Leff, Jakob Rabitsch, Sylvester Willy Sivertsen	Ari Leff, Jakob Rabitsch, Sylvester Willy Sivertsen	—	2023	
"Kind of Love"	Seungkwan	Mother OST Part 5 (soundtrack)	Ha Mel-li	Lee Sang-hoon	Lee Sang-hoon	2018	
"Like Spring"	Gummy and Seungkwan	(single)	Gummy	Jun Sang-hwan, Bae Bang-jin, Ahn Jun-min	Youngmin Ahn, Renaud Eugene Lee	2026	
"Lonely Stars" (English ver.)	Seungkwan	Lonely Stars	gxxdkelvin, Young Chance, Soma Genda, Kanata Okajima	Soma Genda, Kanata Okajima	Soma Genda	2024	
"Lonely Stars" Japanese ver.	Seungkwan	Lonely Stars	Soma Genda, Kanata Okajima	Soma Genda, Kanata Okajima	Soma Genda	2024	
"Lonely Stars" Korean ver.	Seungkwan	Lonely Stars	Lee Seu Ran, Soma Genda, Kanata Okajima	Soma Genda, Kanata Okajima	Soma Genda	2024	
"Love Is Gone (with JOSHUA of Seventeen)"	SLANDER and Joshua	(single)	Dylan Matthew, Derek Andersen, Scott Land	Dylan Matthew, Derek Andersen, Scott Land	—	2025	
"Love Is Gone (with JOSHUA of Seventeen and Dylan Matthew)"	SLANDER, Joshua and Dylan Matthew	(single)	Dylan Matthew, Derek Andersen, Scott Land	Dylan Matthew, Derek Andersen, Scott Land	—	2025	
"Miracle"	Woozi	The Tale of Nokdu OST Part 3 (soundtrack)	ZigZag Note, Mun Sang-seon, moonc	ZigZag Note, Mun Sang-seon, moonc	ZigZag Note, Mun Sang-seon	2019	
"Missed Connections"	DK	Tempted OST Part 3 (soundtrack)	Good Choice, A.Tone, Kim Hyun-seok	A.Tone, Kim Hyun-seok	A.Tone, Kim Hyun-seok, Kang Dong-wook	2018	
"Mom's Missed Call"	Jun and The8	Mom's Missed Call	Liu Huanrui	Chen Yu	—	2021	
"Moon" ◆	Various artists (Hoshi × Wonwoo × Mingyu × DK × Seungkwan)	(single)	MJ, Jinjin, Cha Eun-woo, Yoon San-ha, Rocky	Jinjin, Kim Subin	Jinjin, Kim Subin	2025	
"Never Losing"	DK	Return of the Blossoming Blade OST Part 5 (soundtrack)	Kebee, Lee Eun-yu, Rhymer	OUOW, Kebee	OUOW	2026	
"One" (Spotify Singles)	DxS	Spotify Singles	3!, Jang Yoona, Park Jin Beom, Song Ji Yu, Lee Ge	Nickko Young, d'tour, Neckwav	—	2026	
"One More Dance"	Joshua and Corbyn Besson	K-POPS! (Music from and Inspired by the Motion Picture)	Corbyn Besson, Shae Jacobs, Samuel Lee, David Charles Fischer, Dwayne Abernathy Jr., Calle Lehman	Corbyn Besson, Shae Jacobs, Samuel Lee, David Charles Fischer, Dwayne Abernathy Jr., Calle Lehman	—	2026	
"Pit a Pat"	Seungkwan	Link: Eat, Love, Kill OST Part 4 (soundtrack)	Nam Hye-seung, Park Jin-ho	Nam Hye-seung, Park Jin-ho	Nam Hye-seung, Park Jin-ho	2022	
"Run Like Gump"	Jun	Run Like Gump	Tang Hanxiao	Tang Hanxiao	—	2024	
"Screen Time (feat. Hoshi of Seventeen)" ⁂	Epik High feat. Hoshi	(single)	Tablo, Mithra Jin	Tablo	Tablo	2023	
"SHINGIRU"	Joshua and Hoshi	Bro & Marble OST Part 2 (soundtrack)	GESTURE, Glenn	Bir$day, GESTURE, Glenn	Bir$day	2023	
"Short Hair"	DK	Welcome to Samdal-ri OST Part 1 (soundtrack)	Park Geon-ho	Cho Yong-pil	Lee Ki-hwan, Moon (KIPLE)	2023	
"Silence"	DxS	Serenade	Lee O Neul, Na Jeongah	Haedo, Sarah.J, Rouno	—	2026	
"Silent Boarding Gate"	Jun	Silent Boarding Gate	Yi Jiayang	Chen Jinhao, Yan Shiming, Yang Jiacheng, Jia Wang, Wang Junkai	—	2021	
"So Many Roads"	Lola James Harper and Joshua	(single)	Rami Mekdachi, Lili Mekdachi, Noé Mekdachi	Rami Mekdachi, Lili Mekdachi, Noé Mekdachi	—	2025	
"Somewhere in This Universe"	Seungkwan	When the Stars Gossip OST Part 4 (soundtrack)	Nam Hye-seung, Kim Kyung-hee	Nam Hye-seung, Kim Kyung-hee	Nam Hye-seung, Kim Kyung-hee	2025	
"Spring, Summer, Fall, Winter" Japanese ver.	Wonwoo	(digital album)	Katsuhiko Sugiyama	Katsuhiko Sugiyama, Takayuki "Kojiro" Sasaki	Takayuki "Kojiro" Sasaki	2026	
"Spring, Summer, Fall, Winter" Korean ver.	Wonwoo	(digital album)	Katsuhiko Sugiyama, Cho Yoon-kyung	Katsuhiko Sugiyama, Takayuki "Kojiro" Sasaki	Takayuki "Kojiro" Sasaki	2026	
"Still You"	Seungkwan	Dr. Romantic 3 OST Part 4 (soundtrack)	Yun Jin-hyo, BC3000	J.SEASON	Yun Jin-hyo	2023	
"Stay With Me"	DK	Spooky in Love OST Part 2 (soundtrack)	YOSKE	YOSKE, Choi Su Hwan	YOSKE, Choi Su Hwan	2026	
"SWEETEST THING"	Seventeen (Joshua × Wonwoo × DK × Seungkwan × Dino)	Chocolate OST Part 1 (soundtrack)	Kiggen, ESBEE	Kiggen, ESBEE, The Apple of My Eye, BYMORE	BYMORE	2019	
"The Moment You Arrive"	Seungkwan	Tell Me That You Love Me OST Part 4 (soundtrack)	Nam Hye-seung, Park Jin-ho	Nam Hye-seung, Park Jin-ho	Nam Hye-seung, Park Jin-ho	2023	
"The Reason"	Seungkwan	Lovestruck in the City OST Part 6 (soundtrack)	Nam Hye-seung, Park Jin-ho	Nam Hye-seung, Park Jin-ho	Nam Hye-seung, Park Jin-ho	2021	
"The Reasons of My Smiles"	BSS	Queen of Tears OST Part 1 (soundtrack)	Nam Hye-seung, Kim Kyung-hee	Nam Hye-seung, Kim Kyung-hee	Nam Hye-seung, Kim Kyung-hee	2024	
"Til' My Fingers Bleed"	Dino, Duckwrth and Telle	(single)	Alex Karlsson, T-Ma, Jared Lee	Alex Karlsson, T-Ma, Jared Lee	T-Ma	2025	
"Time Spoken in Ink"	The8	My Wife's Double Life OST (soundtrack)	Lin Qiao	Du Zhiwen	Du Zhiwen	2024	
"Warrior"	Seventeen (Joshua × Jun × The8 × Mingyu × Vernon)	Falling into Your Smile OST (soundtrack)	Edd Holloway, Nick Atkinson; Chinese ver.: Lin Qiao	Edd Holloway, Nick Atkinson, Tim Nelson	Tim Nelson, Pink Slip	2021	
"When the Wind Blows"	The8	Love's Rebellion OST (soundtrack)	Yang Yushi	Du Zhiwen	Du Zhiwen	2024	
"Worth It"	Jun	(single)	Liao Yingru	Huang Mingzhou	—	2025	
"YOSM" ⁂	Kanto feat. Woozi	14216	Kanto, XEPY	XEPY, Won Young-heon, Dong Ne-hyeong, It's B, Geum Myung-sik	Won Young-heon, Dong Ne-hyeong	2016	

== See also ==
- Seventeen discography
- Seventeen videography
- List of Seventeen live performances
- List of music releases by Seventeen and its members
