= Left & Right (Seventeen song) =

Single by Seventeen

from the EP Heng:garæ
- Language: Korean
- Released: June 22, 2020
- Genre: K-pop
- Length: 3:21
- Label: Pledis
- Composers: Woozi; Bumzu
- Lyricists: Woozi; Bumzu; Vernon

Seventeen singles chronology
"Fear" (2019)	"Left & Right" (2020)	"Home;Run" (2020)

Music video
- "Left & Right" on YouTube

"Left & Right" is a song by South Korean boy group Seventeen. It was released as the lead single from their 2020 extended play, Heng:garæ, on June 22, 2020.

== Background and release ==
On June 8, 2020, Pledis Entertainment announced that Seventeen would be releasing their seventh mini-album titled Heng:garæ. The EP marked an intentional shift in tone for the group, expressing themes of celebration and growth, in contrast to the concept of uncertainty and trepidation for the future that embodied their 2019 studio album An Ode. On June 21, a day before its official release, Seventeen released a clip of the EP's lead single "Left and Right" on TikTok as a dance challenge. On June 22, Seventeen released Heng:garæ alongside "Left & Right" and its accompanying music video. This marked Seventeen's first release after the acquisition of their agency Pledis Entertainment by Hybe Corporation in May 2020.

== Lyrics and composition ==
The lead track, ‘Left & Right,’ is a message for young people who challenge themselves to reach their dream. They may be going left and right, not knowing what path to take, but through that period, they will later be able to shoot up to the sky with their strength.

— Woozi on the song's lyrics, The Korea Herald

"Left & Right" was composed by Woozi and Bumzu, while its lyrics were written by Woozi, Bumzu, and Vernon. The track has been described to be based in "retro hip-hop sounds" that evoke an "early '00s feel" with Seventeen's unique musical color. Although the group's members expressed apprehension on the choice of genre, which they had no previous experience in, "Left & Right" was selected as the title track for their new EP due to its danceability and encouraging themes of cheering on the youth. Thematically, the song expresses a message of moving forward with strength and without fear.

== Music video ==
On June 22, 2020, the music video for "Left & Right" was released on YouTube. It depicted Seventeen spiritedly performing across different sets, including construction sites, vehicles, rooftops, and racing tracks, before launching a car into the sky. On August 8, the video was announced to have surpassed 100 million views. On July 20, a surprise part-switch choreography video, which features the Seventeen members taking on the dance role of a different member, was released. On January 13, 2021, Seventeen released a performance video of the song on The Kelly Clarkson Show, showcasing the group's choreography across sets inspired by offices and gritty subway stations.

== Critical reception ==
Writing for The Line of Best Fit, Sophia Simon-Bashall labeled "Left & Right" as "the perfect title track for an album that throws out the rule book" and noted the song "emphasises the value in trusting your own decisions and revelling in them rather than overthinking". Debushree Dutta of Rolling Stone India positively summarized the song as "a synthesis of their discernible rhythm, passion, and unfailing nonchalance, but optimism before anything" and concluded that "its vivacity, inclusive of bright vocals, frisky rap, and insights inherent, all mesh into candid fun, full of the joys of spring".

Billboard placed the song at number three on its list of the best K-Pop songs of 2020, describing the track to be "so exuberant that every sound [...] bursts forth like aural confetti".

== Commercial performance ==
"Left & Right" debuted at number eight on the Gaon Digital Chart for the week of June 28 – July 4, 2020.

== Accolades ==
On South Korean music programs, "Left & Right" won four first place awards.

Music program awards for "Left & Right"
Program	Date	Ref.
M Countdown	July 2, 2020	
Music Bank	July 3, 2020	
Show Champion	July 1, 2020	
Show! Music Core	July 4, 2020	

== Charts ==
=== Weekly charts ===
Weekly chart performance for "Left & Right"
Chart (2020)	Peak position
Japan Hot 100 (Billboard)	50
South Korea (Gaon)	8
US World Digital Songs (Billboard)	8

=== Monthly charts ===
Monthly chart performance for "Left & Right"
Chart (2020)	Position
South Korea (Gaon)	39

== Certifications ==
Certifications for "Left & Right"
Region	Certification	Certified units/sales
Streaming
Japan (RIAJ)	Gold	50,000,000^{†}
^{†} Streaming-only figures based on certification alone.
