= We Make You =

2018 album by Seventeen

EP by Seventeen
- Released: May 30, 2018
- Genre: J-pop; dance-pop
- Length: 16:56
- Language: Japanese; English
- Label: Pledis Japan
- Producer: Woozi; Bumzu

Seventeen chronology
Director's Cut (2018)	We Make You (2018)	You Make My Day (2018)

Singles from We Make You
- 1. "Call Call Call!" Released: May 16, 2018

We Make You is the first Japanese-language extended play (EP) by South Korean boy group Seventeen. It was released on May 30, 2018 by Pledis Japan. The EP includes the Japanese versions of four previously released songs, as well as its new lead single "Call Call Call!". It peaked at number two on Oricon's weekly charts and charted for a total of 74 weeks.

== Background ==
Seventeen debuted in 2015 with the Korean-language EP 17 Carat; in August 2016, they hosted their first concerts in Japan, in Tokyo and Osaka. Over the next few years, Seventeen continued to perform in Japan at progressively larger venues. In early 2018, they held a six-date tour for 110,000 Japanese fans. At one of these concerts, in Yokohama Arena, Seventeen announced that they would be making their Japanese language debut in May that year. The album was officially announced via their Japanese fan club on February 22, 2018 Its title and tracklist were revealed on March 14.

== Commercial performance ==
Upon release, We Make You charted at number one on Oricon's daily chart and peaked at number two on the weekly chart, their highest performance to date on the Japanese weekly charts. We Make You stayed on the weekly chart for a total of 74 weeks.

== Track listing ==
Credits adapted from KOMCA

No.	Title	Lyrics	Music	Arrangements	Length
1.	"Call Call Call!"	Bumzu; Woozi	Bumzu; Woozi; Park Ki-tae	Bumzu; Park Ki-tae	3:20
2.	"Highlight (Japanese Ver)" (Performance Unit, from Going Seventeen)	Bumzu; Dino; Hoshi; Jun; The8; Lee Yu Jeong	Bumzu; Hoshi	Bumzu	3:47
3.	"Lean On Me (Japanese Ver)" (Hip Hop Unit, from Going Seventeen)	Bumzu; S.Coups; Wonwoo; Vernon; Mingyu	Bumzu	Bumzu	3:25
4.	"20 (Japanese Ver)" (Vocal unit, from 17 Carat)	Woozi	Woozi; Dong Ne-hyeong; Won Young-Heon	Dong Ne-hyeong; Won Young-Heon	3:24
5.	"Love Letter (Japanese Ver)" (from Love & Letter)	S.Coups; Woozi; Wonwoo; Vernon; Mingyu	Woozi; Dong Ne-hyeong; Won Young-Heon	Won Young-Heon; Dong Ne-hyeong; Choi Min Sik	3:00
Total length:					16:56

== Charts ==
Chart performance for We Make You
Chart (2018)	Peak position
Japanese Albums (Oricon)	2
Japan Hot Albums (Billboard Japan)	2

== Certifications ==
Certifications and sales
Region	Certification	Certified units/sales
Japan (RIAJ)	Gold	100,000^{^}
^{^} Shipments figures based on certification alone.
