= 24H (EP) =

2020 album by Seventeen

EP by Seventeen
- Released: September 9, 2020
- Genres: J-pop; dance-pop; hip-hop
- Length: 17:34
- Languages: Japanese; English
- Label: Pledis Japan
- Producers: Woozi, Bumzu

Seventeen chronology
Heng:garæ (2020)	24H (2020)	Semicolon (2020)

Singles from 24H
- 1. "24H" Released: August 24, 2020

24H is the second Japanese extended play (EP) and tenth overall by South Korean boy group Seventeen. It was released on September 9, 2020, through Pledis Japan. It featured a lead single of the same name.

== Background and release ==
After releasing their second Japanese single "Fallin' Flower" in April 2020, Seventeen announced their second Japanese EP 24H, which was to be promoted with a title track of the same name as a pre-release single. The song "24H" was released on Japanese radio through the station Tokyo FM School of Lock on August 18. It was digitally released alongside its accompanying music video on August 24. The EP was released on September 9, 2020.

== Commercial performance ==
In Japan, 24H accumulated a pre-order volume of 450,000 copies and sold 240,000 copies during its first week of release. It debuted at number one on the Oricon Albums Chart for the week of September 7 to 15, 2020. Following Seventeen's other successes atop the chart with their Korean-language EPs You Made My Dawn and Heng:garæ, as well as their third studio album An Ode, this achievement marked Seventeen as the first foreign international male artist to top the Oricon weekly album chart with four consecutive albums.

== Accolades ==
The EP was awarded as one of the records selected for The Best 3 Albums (Asia) category at the 35th Japan Gold Disc Awards.

== Track listing ==
24H track listing
No.	Title	Lyrics	Music	Arrangements	Length
1.	"24H"	Woozi; Bumzu	Woozi; Bumzu; Park Gitae	Park Gitae	3:05
2.	"Pinwheel" (Japanese version; performed by Vocal Unit)	Woozi	Woozi; Dong Ne-hyeong; Won Yeong-heon	Dong Ne-hyeong; Won Yeong-heon	3:39
3.	"247" (Japanese version; performed by Performance Unit)	Woozi; Bumzu; The8; Hoshi; Dino	Woozi; Bumzu; Park Gitae	Bumzu; Park Gitae	3:34
4.	"Chilli" (Japanese version; performed by Hiphop unit)	S.Coups; Wonwoo; Mingyu; Vernon	Vernon; Bumzu; Poptime	PopTime	3:04
5.	"Together" (Japanese version)	Woozi; Bumzu; S.Coups; Hoshi; Mingyu	Woozi; Bumzu; Park Gitae	Bumzu; Park Gitae; Nmore	4:04
Total length:					17:34

== Charts ==
=== Weekly charts ===
Weekly chart performance
Chart (2020)	Peak position
Japanese Albums (Oricon)	1
Japan Hot Albums (Billboard Japan)	1

=== Monthly charts ===
Monthly chart performance
Chart (2020)	Peak position
Japanese Albums (Oricon)	2

=== Year-end charts ===
Year-end chart performance
Chart (2020)	Peak position
Japanese Albums (Oricon)	8
Japan Hot Albums (Billboard Japan)	9

== Certifications ==
Certifications and sales
Region	Certification	Certified units/sales
Japan (RIAJ)	Platinum	250,000^{^}
^{^} Shipments figures based on certification alone.
