= You Make My Day =

EP by Seventeen
- Released: July 16, 2018
- Recorded: 2018
- Genre: K-pop
- Length: 19:09
- Language: Korean; English
- Label: Pledis Entertainment; Kakao M
- Producer: Woozi; Bumzu; S.Coups; Park Gi-Tae; Anchor

Seventeen chronology
| We Make You (2018) | You Make My Day (2018) | You Made My Dawn (2019) |

Singles from You Make My Day
- 1. "Oh My!" Released: July 16, 2018

You Make My Day is the fifth Korean extended play and sixth overall South Korean boy group Seventeen. It was released on July 16, 2018, by Pledis Entertainment. The album has six tracks, including the single "Oh My!".

== Track listing ==
Credits adapted from KOMCA

| No. | Title | Lyrics | Music | Arrangements | Length |
|---|---|---|---|---|---|
| 1. | "Oh My!" (어쩌나) | Bumzu; Woozi; S.Coups; Vernon | Bumzu; Woozi | Bumzu; Park Gi-tae | 3:15 |
| 2. | "Holiday" | Bumzu; S.Coups; Woozi; Wonwoo | Bumzu; S.Coups; Woozi; Park Ki-tae | Bumzu; Park Ki-tae | 3:26 |
| 3. | "Come to Me" (나에게로 와) (Vocal Team) | Bumzu; Woozi | Bumzu; Woozi | Bumzu; Woozi | 3:09 |
| 4. | "What's Good" (Hip-Hop Team) | S.Coups; Wonwoo; Vernon; Mingyu | Bumzu | Bumzu; Anchor | 2:48 |
| 5. | "Moonwalker" (Performance Team) | Bumzu; Woozi; Dino; Hoshi | Bumzu; Woozi; Park Gi-tae | Park Gi-tae | 3:00 |
| 6. | "Our Dawn Is Hotter Than Day" (우리의 새벽은 낮보다 뜨겁다) | Bumzu; S.Coups; Woozi; Wonwoo; Vernon; Mingyu | Bumzu; Anchor); Woozi | Bumzu; Anchor | 3:32 |
| Total length: | | | | | 19:15 |

== Charts ==
=== Weekly charts ===
| Chart (2019) | Peak position |
|---|---|
| South Korean Albums (Gaon) | 1 |
| US World Albums (Billboard) | 3 |

=== Year-end charts ===
| Chart (2019) | Position |
|---|---|
| South Korean Albums (Gaon) | 8 |

== Certifications ==
Certifications for You Make My Day
| Region | Certification | Certified units/sales |
|---|---|---|
| South Korea (KMCA) | 2× Platinum | 500,000^{^} |
^{^} Shipments figures based on certification alone.
