= Fear (Seventeen song) =

2019 single by Seventeen

Single by Seventeen

from the album An Ode
- Language: Korean
- Released: September 16, 2019
- Genre: K-pop; R&B; Electro-pop
- Length: 2:56
- Label: Pledis
- Composers: Woozi; Bumzu
- Lyricists: Woozi; Bumzu; Vernon; S.Coups

Seventeen singles chronology
"Hit" (2019)	"Fear" (2019)	"Fallin' Flower" (2020)

Music video
- "Fear" on YouTube

"Fear" (Korean: 독: Fear; RR: Dok: Fear; lit. 'Poison: Fear') is a song by South Korean boy group Seventeen. It was released as the second single from their third studio album An Ode on September 16, 2019.

== Background and release ==
In July 2019, Seventeen began sharing teasers for new music, to be released in August. On August 5, they released a digital single titled "Hit", and then revealed they would be releasing an album the next month. The full tracklist was released September 9, revealing the lead single for the album would be titled "Fear". Various lyrics from "Fear" were released four days before the album's release. The song and its music video were released simultaneously on September 16. On the same day, Seventeen held a showcase to commemorate the new album, performing "Fear" for the first time.

== Composition ==
"Fear" was written by Seventeen members Woozi, S.Coups and Vernon, alongside regular collaborator Bumzu, and was composed by Woozi and Bumzu. It has been described as an r&b and electro-pop song with lyrics describing feelings of being the poison in a toxic relationship. The song is in the key of G minor with a tempo of 146 beats per minute.

== Music video ==
The music video was released the same day as the album, following two teasers. Directed by Yoon Rima and Jang Dongju of Rigend Film, the video features the members of the group dancing and singing amongst dark colours and dramatic backdrops. The makeup throughout the video was noted to be more dramatic than Seventeen's usual style, specifically the contrast of red lipstick smeared across Jeonghan's lips.

== Accolades ==
On South Korean music programs, "Fear" won two first place awards; one at the September 26 broadcast of M Countdown and one at the September 27 broadcast of Music Bank. "Fear" was listed in multiple publications' year-end lists for best K-pop songs and music videos, and received nominations at the 2019 Mnet Asian Music Awards.

"Fear" on select listicles
Publication	List	Rank	Ref.
Billboard	The 25 Best K-pop Songs of 2019	23	
SBS PopAsia	Top 100 Asian pop songs of 2019	28	
BuzzFeed	Best K-pop Music Videos of 2019	12	
Rolling Stone India	10 Best K-pop Music Videos of 2019	—N/a	
CelebMix	Top 10 K-pop songs of 2019	9	

Awards for "Fear"
Year	Organization	Award	Nominated Work	Result	Ref.
2019	Mnet Asian Music Awards	Best Dance Performance – Male Group	"Fear"	Nominated	
2019	Mnet Asian Music Awards	Song of the Year	"Fear"	Longlisted	

== Credits and personnel ==
Credits adapted from the An Ode lyric book.

Location

- Recorded at Universe Factory and Ingrid Studio
- Edited at Ingrid Studio
- Mixed at Section AB and Prismfilter Mix Lab

Credits and personnel

- Woozi – lyrics, composition, chorus
- Bumzu – lyrics, composition, arrangement, chorus, synthesizer, recording
- Vernon – lyrics,
- S.Coups – lyrics
- Seungkwan – chorus
- Park Ki-tae – arrangement, guitar
- Jeong Eun-kyung – recording, digital editing
- Ramy de Miro – mixing
- Anchor – mixing

== Charts ==
Weekly chart performance for "Fear"
Chart (2019)	Peak position
Japan (Japan Hot 100) (Billboard)	24
South Korea (Gaon)	66
US World Digital Song Sales (Billboard)	6
