= Al1 =

2017 extended play by Seventeen

EP by Seventeen
- Released: May 22, 2017
- Recorded: 2017
- Genre: Pop; EDM; hip hop
- Length: 26:24
- Language: Korean; English
- Label: Pledis; LOEN
- Producer: Woozi; Bumzu

Seventeen chronology
Going Seventeen (2016)	Al1 (2017)	Teen, Age (2017)

Singles from Al1
- 1. "Don't Wanna Cry" Released: May 22, 2017

Al1 (pronounced Alone) is the fourth extended play by South Korean boy group Seventeen. It was released on May 22, 2017, by Pledis Entertainment. The album contains eight tracks, including the lead single "Don't Wanna Cry".

== Background and release ==
On May 11, 2017, Pledis Entertainment released a video teaser on Seventeen's Instagram page in preparation for Al1. The video features member Vernon wandering around a deserted road with a compass in his hand. Over the next five days, twelve similar trailers, one for each member, were released on Seventeen's social media accounts. While revealing teasers, Seventeen announced the tour that would accompany the album titled 'Diamond Edge', due to start in July. On May 17, they revealed the tracklist for the album.

== Promotions ==
On May 26, 2017, Seventeen made their comeback on MBC's Show! Music Core music program. This was followed by promotions on SBS MTV's The Show, MBC Music's Show Champion, Mnet's M Countdown and KBS's Music Bank, with Seventeen collecting six wins in total for their lead single "Don't Wanna Cry".

== Commercial performance ==
After a month of its release, Al1 sold over 250,000 copies and topped both the weekly Gaon Album Chart for the chart issued on May 27, 2017, and the monthly chart recorded for May. The album also debuted and peaked at number two on the World Albums chart for the week ending on May 25, having sold 2,000 units in the United States. The album peaked at number three on Japan's Oricon Albums Chart, the group's highest entry until then.

== Track listing ==
Al1 track listing
No.	Title	Lyrics	Music	Arrangement	Length
1.	"Don't Wanna Cry" (Korean: 울고 싶지 않아; RR: Ulgo Sipji Ana)	Bumzu; S.Coups; Woozi; Hoshi; Jeonghan	Woozi; Bumzu	Bumzu	3:23
2.	"Habit" (입버릇; Ipbeoreut) (Vocal Team))	Woozi	Woozi; Simon Petrén	Petrén	4:13
3.	"IF I" (Hip-hop Team)	S.Coups; Vernon; Mingyu	Bumzu	Bumzu	3:09
4.	"Swimming Fool" (Performance Team)	Bumzu; Woozi; Dino; Vernon	Bumzu; Woozi; Hoshi	Bumzu	3:07
5.	"My I" (Jun & The8)	Bumzu; Jun; The8	Bumzu; Woozi	Bumzu	3:04
6.	"Crazy in Love"	Bumzu; S.Coups; Woozi; Vernon; Mingyu	Bumzu; Anchor; Woozi	Bumzu; Anchor	3:35
Total length:					20:37

Physical Edition
No.	Title	Lyrics	Music	Arrangement	Length
7.	"Who" (Performance Team)	Dino; Hoshi	Woozi; Won Yeong-heon; Dong Ne-hyeong	Won Yeong-heon; Dong Ne-hyeong	3:20
8.	"Check-In" (Remastering) (Hip-hop Team)	S.Coups; Wonwoo; Vernon; Mingyu; Bumzu	Bumzu	Bumzu	2:33
Total length:					26:30

== Charts ==
=== Weekly charts ===
Weekly chart performance for Al1
Chart (2017)	Peak position
Japan Albums (Oricon)	3
South Korean Albums (Gaon)	1
US Heatseekers Albums (Billboard)	10
US World Albums (Billboard)	2

=== Monthly Charts ===
Monthly chart performance for Al1
Chart (2017)	Peak position
South Korean Albums (Gaon)	1

== Release history ==
Region	Date	Format	Label	Ref.
South Korea	May 22, 2017	CD; digital download	Pledis Entertainment; LOEN Entertainment	
Various	May 22, 2017	Digital download	Pledis Entertainment; LOEN Entertainment	
Taiwan	July 5, 2017	CD	Warner Music Taiwan	
