= Boys Be (EP) =

2015 album by Seventeen

EP by Seventeen
- Released: September 10, 2015
- Genre: K-pop; dance-pop; hip hop
- Length: 15:51
- Language: Korean; English
- Label: Pledis; LOEN

Seventeen chronology
17 Carat (2015)	Boys Be (2015)	Love & Letter (2016)

Singles from Boys Be
- 1. "Mansae" Released: September 10, 2015

Boys Be is the second extended play (EP) from South Korean boy band Seventeen. It was released on September 10, 2015, by Pledis Entertainment. The album consists of five tracks, including the title track, "Mansae".

== Commercial performance ==
The EP sold over 169,833 copies. In South Korea, it peaked at number two on the Gaon Chart and number one on Billboard World Albums Chart.

== Track listing ==
Credits adapted from KOMCA

Official track list
No.	Title	Lyrics	Music	Arrangements	Length
1.	"Fronting" (표정관리; Pyojeonggwalli; lit. 'Control of Facial Expression') (performed by Hip-Hop Team + Woozi and Hoshi)	S.Coups; Woozi; Wonwoo; Vernon; Mingyu	Bumzu		3:05
2.	"Mansae" (만세; Manse; lit. 'Hurray')	Bumzu; S.Coups; Woozi; Wonwoo; Vernon; Mingyu	Bumzu; Woozi		3:07
3.	"어른이 되면" (When I Grow Up) (performed by Vocal Team)	Woozi	Woozi; Won Young-heon; Dong Ne-hyung	Won Young-heon; Dong Ne-Hyung	3:23
4.	"OMG" (performed by Performance Team)	Woozi; Dino	Woozi; Won Young-heon; Dong Ne-Hyung	Won Young-heon; Dong Ne-Hyung	3:04
5.	"Rock"	S.Coups; Woozi; Wonwoo; Vernon	Woozi; Won Young-heon; Dong Ne-Hyung	Won Young-heon; Dong Ne-Hyung	3:12

== Personnel ==
Arrangement credits adapted from Melon and Dork.

Musicians

- SEVENTEEN - primary vocals
  - S.Coups - vocals (1, 2, 5)
  - Jeonghan - vocals (2, 3, 5)
  - Joshua - vocals (2, 3, 5)
  - Jun - vocals (2, 4, 5)
  - Hoshi - vocals (2, 4, 5)
  - Wonwoo - vocals (1, 2, 5)
  - Woozi - vocals (2, 3, 5), chorus vocals (3-5)
  - DK - vocals (2, 3, 5)
  - Mingyu - vocals (1, 2, 5)
  - The8 - vocals (2, 4, 5)
  - Seungkwan - vocals (2, 3, 5)
  - Vernon - vocals (1, 2, 5)
  - Dino - vocals (2, 4, 5)
- Lee Dong Hyeok - bass (1, 2)
- Park Ki Tae - guitar (1, 2)
- Lee Yu Jeong - electric piano (1)
- Dong Ne Hyeong - bass, drums, keyboards (3-5)
- Won Young Heon - bass, drums, keyboards (3-5)
- Lee Tae Wook - guitar (3)
- Lee Yang Ban - piano (3)

Technical

- Bumzu - recording (1, 2), background vocals (1, 2), chorus vocals (3)
- Kim Dae Young - recording, mixing (1)
- Stay Tuned - mixing (2)
- MasterKey - mixing (3-5)

== Charts ==
=== Weekly charts ===
Weekly chart performance for Boys Be
Chart (2015)	Peak position
Japanese Albums (Oricon)	35
South Korean Albums (Gaon)	2
US World Albums (Billboard)	1

=== Year-end charts ===
Year-end chart performance for Boys Be
Chart (2015)	Peak position
South Korean Albums (Gaon)	15
