= Heng:garæ =

EP by Seventeen
- Released: June 22, 2020
- Recorded: 2020
- Length: 20:49
- Language: Korean; English
- Label: Pledis

Seventeen chronology
An Ode (2019)	Heng:garæ (2020)	24H (2020)

Singles from Heng:garæ
- 1. "My My" Released: June 12, 2020; 2. "Left & Right" Released: June 22, 2020

Heng:garæ (헹가래) is the seventh Korean extended play (EP) and eighth overall by South Korean boy group Seventeen. It was released on June 22, 2020, by Pledis Entertainment. The album has six tracks, including the singles "My My" and "Left & Right".

== Background ==
On June 8, 2020, Pledis Entertainment announced that Seventeen would be releasing a new album on June 22. Serving as the band's first Korean release since their third studio album An Ode the previous year, Heng:garæ marked an intentional shift in musical tone; in contrast to An Ode, which was painted with "uncertainty and trepidation for the future", the EP embraced the theme of "the journey of finding your purpose and celebrating it alongside the ones you love".

The album was Seventeen's first release after the acquisition of the band's agency, Pledis Entertainment, by Hybe Corporation in May 2020.

== Commercial performance ==
Heng:garæ garnered over 1.06 million units in its initial pre-order volume. Within its first week of release, the EP sold 1,097,891 copies for the week of June 22–28, having reached one million units by the end of its fifth day; this marked Seventeen's first million-selling album and identified the band as the second act in history to surpass one million copies in sales within a week, behind BTS. After a month of its debut, the album totaled 1,207,513 units sold.

== Critical reception ==
Professional ratings for Second Wind
Review scores
Source	Rating
The Line of Best Fit	8/10

Reviewing for The Line of Best Fit, Sophia Simon-Bashall commended Heng:garæ for staying true to the band's musical identity, describing it as "an album that captures the essence of Seventeen", as well as "a record filled with warmth, genuine love, and respect for their listeners".

== Track listing ==
Credits adapted from KOMCA

No.	Title	Lyrics	Music	Arrangements	Length
1.	"Fearless"	Woozi; Bumzu; Vernon	Bumzu; Woozi; Simon Petrén	Bumzu; Petrén	3:14
2.	"Left & Right"	Bumzu; Woozi; Vernon	Bumzu; Woozi	Bumzu	3:21
3.	"I Wish" (좋겠다)	Bumzu; Woozi; Wonwoo; Hwang Hyun	Bumzu; Woozi; Hwang Hyun	Hwang Hyun	3:53
4.	"My My"	Bumzu; S.Coups; Woozi; Vernon	Bumzu; Woozi; Vernon	Bumzu; Woozi; Park Gi-tae	3:05
5.	"Kidult" (어른 아이)	Bumzu; S.Coups; Woozi; Vernon	Bumzu; S.Coups; Woozi; Park Gi-tae	Park Gi-tae	3:12
6.	"Together" (같이 가요)	Bumzu; S.Coups; Woozi; Hoshi; Mingyu	Bumzu; Woozi; Park Gi-tae	Bumzu; Nmore; Park Gi-tae	4:04
Total length:					20:55

== Charts ==
=== Weekly charts ===
Chart (2020)	Peak position
Japanese Albums (Oricon)	1
Polish Albums (ZPAV)	49
South Korean Albums (Gaon)	1
UK Album Downloads (OCC)	61
US World Albums (Billboard)	14

=== Monthly charts ===
Monthly chart performance
Chart (2020)	Position
Japanese Albums (Oricon)	2
South Korean Albums (Gaon)	1

=== Year-end charts ===
Year-end chart performance
Chart (2020)	Position
Japanese Albums (Oricon)	12
South Korean Albums (Gaon)	3

Year-end chart performance
Chart (2022)	Position
South Korean Albums (Circle)	86

Year-end chart performance
Chart (2023)	Position
South Korean Albums (Circle)	82

== Certifications ==
Certifications
Region	Certification	Certified units/sales
South Korea (KMCA)	Million	1,000,000^{^}
^{^} Shipments figures based on certification alone.
