= Love & Letter =

2016 album by Seventeen

Studio album by Seventeen
- Released: April 25, 2016
- Recorded: 2015–16
- Genre: K-pop; R&B; dance-pop
- Length: 33:13
- Language: Korean; English
- Label: Pledis; LOEN
- Producer: Woozi; Bumzu; Won Young-heon; Dongnehyeong; Lee Hyun-do; Kim Jin-hwan; DarooStar; Kiggen; Lee Gi-yong; Park Gi-tae; Minshikie

Seventeen chronology
Boys Be (2015)	Love & Letter (2016)	Going Seventeen (2016)

Singles from Love & Letter
- 1. "Pretty U" Released: April 25, 2016

Alternative cover
- Reissue cover

Singles from Love & Letter Repackage Album
- 1. "Very Nice" Released: July 4, 2016

Love & Letter, also known as First 'Love & Letter', is the debut studio album by South Korean boy group Seventeen. It was released on April 25, 2016 through Pledis Entertainment. The album is a follow-up to the group's first two EPs, 17 Carat and Boys Be (2015).

== Background and release ==
Love & Letter includes 10 tracks and focuses on themes such as the experience of a first love. The group's members largely created the album, writing or co-writing every track, and composing or co-composing almost every track. "Pretty U" was chosen to be the title track of the album and was performed on multiple music shows by the group throughout the following two and a half months. During this period, the group earned their first two consecutive wins on Show Champion. Their first win was on May 4, 2016, followed by a second win on May 11, 2016.

== Commercial performance ==
The album charted at number three on Billboard's World Albums chart and at number five on the Heatseekers Albums chart. The album's promotional single "Pretty U" charted at number three on the World Digital Songs chart, which marked their highest ranking on the chart to date.

== Reception ==
On June 24, 2016, Seventeen performed at KCON in New York. Commenting on the group's first American appearance, Monique Menendez of Billboard K-Town wrote, "Seventeen bring the sugar with its latest single, 'Pretty U', a bright love song with choreography reminiscent of West Side Story."

== Reissue ==
On July 4, 2016, a repackaged edition of Love & Letter, titled Love & Letter Repackage Album, was released with five new tracks, including the title track "Very Nice". The accompanying music video for the song was released on Naver V App on the same day and received over a million "hearts".

== Track listing ==
Credits adapted from KOMCA

Love & Letter track listing
No.	Title	Lyrics	Music	Arrangement	Length
1.	"Chuck" (엄지척)	S.Coups; Woozi; Wonwoo; Dino; Vernon; Mingyu	Woozi; Won Young-heon; Dong Nehyeong	Won Young-heon; Dong Nehyeong	2:58
2.	"Pretty U" (예쁘다)	Bumzu; S.Coups; Woozi; Vernon; Seungkwan	Bumzu; Woozi; Won Young-heon; Dong Nehyeong	Bumzu; Woozi; Won Young-heon; Dong Nehyeong	3:27
3.	"Still Lonely" (이놈의 인기; performed by Jun, Hoshi, Wonwoo, Woozi, DK, Vernon, Dino)	Woozi; Wonwoo; Hoshi; Vernon; Seungkwan	Woozi; Lee Hyun-do; Kim Jin-hwan	Lee Hyun-do; Kim Jin-hwan	3:26
4.	"Hit Song" (유행가)	Bumzu; S.Coups; Dino; Vernon; Mingyu	Bumzu	Bumzu; Lynn Young-hoon	3:43
5.	"Say Yes" (performed by DK, Seungkwan)	Woozi; DK; Seungkwan; Kiggen	Kiggen	Kiggen	3:50
6.	"Drift Away" (떠내려가; performed by S.Coups, Jeonghan, Joshua, Mingyu, The8, Seungkwan)	S.Coups; Woozi; Hoshi; Mingyu; Seungkwan	Woozi	Bumzu	3:09
7.	"Adore U (Vocal Team Ver.)" (아낀다)	Bumzu; S.Coups; Woozi; Vernon; DK; Seungkwan	Bumzu; Woozi; Yeom Dong-gun	Bumzu; Lee Gi-yong; Woozi	3:44
8.	"Monday to Saturday (Hiphop Team Ver.)" (만.세)	Bumzu; S.Coups; Woozi; Wonwoo; Vernon; Mingyu	Bumzu; Vernon; S.Coups; Woozi	Bumzu	3:23
9.	"Shining Diamond (Performance Team Ver.)"	Kim Min-jung; S.Coups; Woozi; Vernon	Ri Si (LISHBEATS); Woozi; Master Key	Park Gi-tae (Prismfilter)	2:30
10.	"Love Letter" (사랑쪽지)	S.Coups; Woozi; Vernon; Mingyu; Wonwoo	Woozi; Won Young-heon; Dong Nehyeong	Won Young-heon; Dong Nehyeong; Minshikie	2:58
Total length:					33:13

Love & Letter Repackage Album bonus tracks
No.	Title	Lyrics	Music	Arrangement	Length
1.	"No F.U.N"	S.Coups; Woozi; Wonwoo; Dino; Hoshi; Vernon; Seungkwan	Woozi; Earattack	Earattack	3:01
2.	"Very Nice" (아주 Nice)	Bumzu; S.Coups; Woozi; Vernon	Bumzu; Woozi	Bumzu	3:12
3.	"Healing" (힐링)	S.Coups; Woozi; Dino; Vernon; Mingyu	Woozi; Won Young-heon; Dong Nehyung	Won Young-heon; Dong Nehyung	3:23
4.	"Simple" (performed by Woozi)	Woozi	Woozi; Won Young-heon; Dong Nehyung; Minshikie	Won Young-heon; Dong Nehyung; Minshikie	3:40
5.	"Space" (끝이 안보여; performed by the Hiphop Team and DK)	Bumzu; S.Coups; Wonwoo; Vernon; Mingyu	Bumzu	Bumzu	3:09
Total length:					49:33

== Personnel ==
Credits adapted from Dork.

Track numbers 1-10 refer to Love & Letter. Bonus track numbers refer to the Love & Letter Repackage Album bonus tracks.

Musicians

- SEVENTEEN - primary vocals
  - S.Coups - vocals (1, 2, 4, 6, 8-10, bonus 1-3, bonus 5), chorus vocals (3)
  - Jeonghan - vocals (1, 2, 4, 6, 7, 9, 10, bonus 1-3)
  - Joshua - vocals (1, 2, 4, 6, 7, 10, bonus 2, bonus 3)
  - Jun - vocals (1-4, 9, 10, bonus 2, bonus 3)
  - Hoshi - vocals (1-4, 9, 10, bonus 1-3)
  - Wonwoo - vocals (1-4, 8-10, bonus 1-3, bonus 5)
  - Woozi - vocals (1-4, 7, 10, bonus 1-4), chorus vocals (1, 3, 9, 10, bonus 1, bonus 4)
  - DK - vocals (1-5, 7, 10, bonus 1-3, bonus 5), chorus vocals (bonus 5)
  - Mingyu - vocals (1, 2, 4, 6, 8, 10, bonus 1-3, bonus 5)
  - The8 - vocals (1, 2, 4, 6, 9, 10, bonus 2, bonus 3)
  - Seungkwan - vocals (1, 2, 4-7, 9, 10, bonus 1-3), chorus vocals (1-3, 7, 10, bonus 1, bonus 2)
  - Vernon - vocals (1-4, 8-10, bonus 1-3, bonus 5), chorus vocals (8)
  - Dino - vocals (1-4, 9, 10, bonus 1-3)
- Won Yeong Heon - bass, drums (1, 10, bonus 3, bonus 4), keyboards (1, 10, bonus 4)
- Dong Ne Hyeong - bass, drums (1, 10, bonus 3, bonus 4), keyboards (1, 10, bonus 4)
- Lee Dong Hyeok - electric bass (2)
- Park Ki Tae - electric guitar (2), guitar (6, bonus 5), synthesizer (9)
- Bae Art - piano (1, 10, bonus 3), guitar (10, bonus 3), bass (bonus 3)
- Jo Ja Young - piano, strings (2, 4, bonus 2)
- Eniac - bass, drums, keyboards (3)
- Lee Hyeon Do - bass, drums, keyboards (3)
- In Young Hoon - piano (4)
- KIGGEN - bass, drums, piano (5)
- Soulman - chorus vocals (5)
- Kim Eui Seok - strings (5)
- Lee Yu Jeong - strings (7)
- Min Sik Lee - guitar (10), bass, drums, keyboards, piano (bonus 4)
- earattack - bass, drums, keyboards (bonus 1)
- Sean Soowan Chung - guitar (bonus 4)

Technical

- Bumzu - recording (2, 4, 6, 8, 9, bonus 2, bonus 5), chorus vocals (2, 4, 6, 8, 9, bonus 2, bonus 4), piano (2, 4, 6, bonus 5)
- MasterKey - mixing (1-3, 5, 8-10, bonus 1, bonus 3, bonus 4)
- Kim Dae Young - recording (1-7, 9, 10, bonus 1-5), mixing (bonus 2, bonus 5)
- Yoon Seulgi - recording (1, 3, 5, 10)
- Jang Woo Young - digital audio editing (3)
- DK Choo - digital audio editing (4)
- Stay Tuned - mixing (4)
- Iggy Young - mixing (6)
- Lee Ji Hong - digital audio editing (7)
- Heo Chan Gu - mixing (7)

== Charts ==
=== Weekly charts ===
Weekly chart performance for Love & Letter and Love & Letter Repackage Album
Chart (2016)	Peak position	
Chart (2016)	L&L	RA
Japanese Albums (Oricon)	8	6
South Korean Albums (Gaon)	1	1
US Heatseekers Albums (Billboard)	5	—
US Independent Albums (Billboard)	42	—
US World Albums (Billboard)	3	—

=== Monthly charts ===
Monthly chart performance for Love & Letter and Love & Letter Repackage Album
Chart (2016)	Peak position	
Chart (2016)	L&L	RA
South Korean Albums (Gaon)	1	1

=== Year-end charts ===
Year-end chart performance for Love & Letter and Love & Letter Repackage Album
Chart (2016)	Peak position	
Chart (2016)	L&L	RA
Japanese Albums (Oricon)	70	—
South Korean Albums (Gaon)	12	26
