= Going Seventeen =

2016 extended play by Seventeen

EP by Seventeen
- Released: December 5, 2016
- Genre: K-pop; dance-pop; hip hop
- Length: 29:38
- Language: Korean; English
- Label: Pledis Entertainment; LOEN Entertainment
- Producer: Woozi; Bumzu

Seventeen chronology
Love & Letter (2016)	Going Seventeen (2016)	Al1 (2017)

Singles from Going Seventeen
- 1. "Boom Boom" Released: December 5, 2016

Going Seventeen is the third extended play from South Korean boy band Seventeen. It was released on December 5, 2016, by Pledis Entertainment. The album consists of eight tracks, including the title track, "Boom Boom".

== Commercial performance ==
The EP sold 269,866+ copies in South Korea. It peaked at number 1 on the Korean Gaon Chart and number 3 on the US World Billboard Chart.

== Track listing ==
Credits adapted from KOMCA

Official track list
No.	Title	Lyrics	Music	Arrangements	Length
1.	"Beautiful" (Joshua, Hoshi, DK, Mingyu, The8, Dino)	Bumzu; Woozi; Dino; Mingyu	Bumzu; Anchor; Woozi; Mingyu	Bumzu; Anchor	3:37
2.	"Boom Boom" (붐붐)	Bumzu; S.Coups; Woozi; Wonwoo; Vernon; Mingyu	Bumzu; Woozi	Bumzu	3:26
3.	"Highlight" (performed by Performance Team)	Bumzu; Dino; Hoshi; Jun; The8; Lee Yoo-jung	Bumzu; Hoshi	Bumzu	3:45
4.	"Lean On Me" (기대) performed by Hiphop Team)	Bumzu; S.Coups; Wonwoo; Vernon; Mingyu	Bumzu	Bumzu	3:25
5.	"Fast Pace" (빠른 걸음)	S.Coups; Woozi; Hoshi; Vernon	Woozi; Seo Jung-jin; Faschinating; Keeproots	Seo Jung-jin; Faschinating; Keeproots	3:41
6.	"Don't Listen In Secret" (몰래 듣지 마요 performed by Vocal Team)	Woozi	Woozi; Won Young-heon; Dong Ne Hyung	Bae Jin-pyo; Won Young-heon; Dong Ne Hyung	3:58
7.	"I Don't Know" (글쎄 S.Coups, Jeonghan, Jun, Wonwoo, Woozi, Seungkwan, Vernon)	S.Coups; Woozi; Vernon	Ri Si (LISHBEATS); Woozi	Ri Si (LISHBEATS)	3:52
8.	"Smile Flower" (웃음꽃)	Woozi	Bae Jin-pyo; Woozi; Won Youngheon; Dong Nehyung	Bae Jin-pyo; Won Young-heon; Dong Nehyung	3:52
Total length:					29:40

Notes:

- "Highlight" is stylized in all caps.

== Personnel ==
Credits adapted from Dork.

Musicians

- SEVENTEEN - primary vocals
  - S.Coups - vocals (2, 4, 5, 7, 8)
  - Jeonghan - vocals (2, 5-8)
  - Joshua - vocals (1, 2, 5, 6, 8)
  - Jun - vocals (2, 3, 5, 7, 8)
  - Hoshi - vocals (1-3, 5, 8)
  - Wonwoo - vocals (2, 4, 5, 8)
  - Woozi - vocals (2, 5-8), chorus vocals (5-8)
  - DK - vocals (1, 2, 5, 6, 8)
  - Mingyu - vocals (1, 2, 4, 5, 8)
  - The8 - vocals (1-3, 5, 8)
  - Seungkwan - vocals (2, 5-8), chorus vocals (3, 5, 7)
  - Vernon - vocals (2, 4, 5, 8)
  - Dino - vocals (1-3, 5, 8)
- Park Ki Tae - guitar (1, 2)
- Anchor (PRISMFILTER) - piano (1)
- Fascinating - bass, drums, keyboards (5)
- Keeproots - bass, drums, keyboards (5)
- Dong Ne Hyeong - bass, keyboards (6, 8), drums (6)
- Won Young Heon - bass, keyboards (6, 8), drums (6)
- Bae Art - guitar, piano, strings (6, 8)
- LISHBEATS - bass, drums, keyboards (7)

Technical

- Bumzu - recording (1, 2), chorus vocals (1-4), piano (1, 4)
- MasterKey - mixing (2, 5-8)
- Kim Dae Young - recording (1-8), mixing (3, 4)
- Kim Min Jung - recording (1-8)
