= You Made My Dawn =

EP by Seventeen
- Released: January 21, 2019
- Genre: K-pop
- Length: 18:28
- Language: Korean; English
- Label: Pledis
- Producer: Woozi, Bumzu, Seungkwan, Hoshi, Vernon, Park Gi-Tae, Anchor, Poptime

Seventeen chronology
You Make My Day (2018)	You Made My Dawn (2019)	An Ode (2019)

Singles from You Made My Dawn
- 1. "Getting Closer" Released: December 20, 2018; 2. "Home" Released: January 21, 2019

You Made My Dawn is the sixth Korean extended play and seventh overall by South Korean boy band Seventeen. It was released on January 21, 2019, through Pledis Entertainment with the lead singles "Getting Closer" and "Home". It debuted atop the Gaon Album Chart, Oricon Albums Chart and at number four on the US Billboard World Albums chart.

== Background ==
One of the group's members, Joshua, said the title is a continuation of the theme of their previous EP, You Make My Day, in that "You made my darkness into dawn. [...] The sun comes in to make the night a little brighter and it progresses into day, right? That's why we tried to compare the flow of emotions to the sun."

== Music ==
Tamar Herman of Billboard described "Home" as "sentimental future bass", while in the publication's prior list of the "10 Most Anticipated K-pop Albums of 2019", Jeff Benjamin described the first track released from the EP, "Getting Closer", as "dark hip-hop".

== Track listing ==
Credits adapted from KOMCA

No.	Title	Lyrics	Music	Arrangements	Length
1.	"Good to Me"	Bumzu; Woozi	Bumzu; Woozi	Bumzu; Park Ki-tae	3:09
2.	"Home"	Woozi; Bumzu	Bumzu; Woozi; Seungkwan	Bumzu; Park Ki-tae	3:23
3.	"Hug" (포옹) (Vocal Team)	Woozi	Woozi; Park Ki-tae	Park Ki-tae	2:39
4.	"Chilli" (칠리) (Hip-Hop Team)	S.Coups; Wonwoo; Vernon; Mingyu	Bumzu; Vernon; Poptime	Poptime	3:03
5.	"Shhh" (Performance Team)	Bumzu; Dino; Hoshi	Bumzu; Anchor	Bumzu; Anchor	3:06
6.	"Getting Closer" (숨이 차)	Bumzu; S.Coups; Woozi; Vernon	Bumzu; Woozi; Hoshi	Bumzu	3:03
Total length:					18:28

== Charts ==
=== Weekly charts ===
Weekly
Chart (2019)	Peak position
French Download Albums (SNEP)	98
Japanese Albums (Oricon)	1
South Korean Albums (Gaon)	1
UK Download Albums (OCC)	69
US Heatseekers Albums (Billboard)	13
US Independent Albums (Billboard)	30
US World Albums (Billboard)	4

=== Year-end charts ===
Chart (2019)	Position
Japanese Albums (Oricon)	20
South Korean Albums (Gaon)	8

== Certifications and sales ==
Region	Certification	Certified units/sales
Japan	—	173,799
South Korea (KMCA)	2× Platinum	500,000^{^}
^{^} Shipments figures based on certification alone.

== Accolades ==
Year-end lists
Critic/Publication	List	Song	Rank	Ref.
Refinery29	The Best K-Pop Songs Of 2019	"Getting Closer"	5	

=== Music program awards ===
Song	Program	Date	Ref.
"Home"	Show Champion (MBC)	January 30, 2019	
"Home"	Show Champion (MBC)	February 13, 2019	
"Home"	M Countdown (Mnet)	January 31, 2019	
"Home"	M Countdown (Mnet)	February 7, 2019	
"Home"	M Countdown (Mnet)	February 14, 2019	
"Home"	Music Bank (KBS)	February 1, 2019	
"Home"	Music Bank (KBS)	February 8, 2019	
"Home"	Music Bank (KBS)	February 15, 2019	
"Home"	Show! Music Core (MBC)	February 2, 2019	
"Home"	Inkigayo (SBS)	February 3, 2019	

== See also ==
- List of Gaon Album Chart number ones of 2019
- List of Oricon number-one albums of 2019
