= An Ode =

- Digital cover

Studio album by Seventeen
- Released: September 16, 2019
- Genre: K-pop
- Length: 36:00
- Languages: Korean; English
- Label: Pledis

Seventeen chronology
You Made My Dawn (2019)	An Ode (2019)	Heng:garæ (2020)

Singles from An Ode
- 1. "Hit" Released: August 5, 2019; 2. "Fear" Released: September 16, 2019

An Ode is the third studio album by South Korean boy band Seventeen. It was released on September 16, 2019, through Pledis Entertainment. The album spawned two singles, "Hit" was released as the album's lead single on August 5, 2019, followed by the title track, "Fear", on the release date of the album.

An Ode was a commercial success, debuted atop the South Korean Gaon Album Chart, and topped the Japanese Oricon Albums Chart in its third week. It also reached number seven on the US Billboard World Albums chart. An Ode sold 822,265 copies in South Korea in September 2019 (including 26,131 copies of the Kihno edition).

== Background and release ==
We expressed our inner fears this time, and a lot of people talked about how we changed. But if you think about it, our inner fears are also part of Seventeen, so it would be great if people can see this as an expansion of our genre instead. We will continue to try to show newer sides of ourselves, so listeners can continue to look forward to our music.

— Woozi, MTV News

On August 5, the single, "Hit" was released with a music video, prior to the rest of the album.

An Ode was released on September 16, 2019, with 5 physical album versions: "Begin", "The Poet", "Hope", "Truth" and "Real". The album also includes a Korean language version of their Japanese single, "Happy Ending". The Japanese single had been previously released on May 29. In contrast to their previous uplifting music style, An Ode showcased a different side of Seventeen, with a darker concept.

The album was supported by the Ode to You tour, which kicked off on October 8 and was scheduled to have performances in several countries in Europe, Asia, and North America. However, due to the COVID-19 pandemic, the remaining stops of the tour were cancelled in February 2020.

== Track listing ==
Credits adapted from KOMCA

Standard edition
No.	Title	Lyrics	Music	Arrangement	Length
1.	"Hit"	Bumzu; Woozi; Vernon	Bumzu; Woozi	Bumzu; Anchor	3:23
2.	"Lie Again" (거짓말을 해)	Bumzu; S.Coups; Woozi; Vernon; Mingyu	Bumzu; Woozi; Simon Petrén	Simon Petrén	3:20
3.	"Fear" (독: Fear)	Bumzu; S.Coups; Woozi; Vernon	Bumzu; Woozi	Bumzu; Park Ki-tae	2:55
4.	"Let Me Hear You Say"	Bumzu; S.Coups; Woozi; Vernon; Mingyu	Bumzu; Woozi	Bumzu; Ohway!	3:00
5.	"247" (Performance Team)	Bumzu; Woozi; Dino; Hoshi; The8	Bumzu; Woozi; Park Ki-tae	Bumzu; Park Ki-tae	3:33
6.	"Second Life" (Vocal Team)	Bumzu; Woozi	Bumzu; Woozi; Vernon	Bumzu	3:22
7.	"Network Love" (Joshua, Jun, The8, Vernon)	Bumzu; Woozi; Vernon; The8	Bumzu; Nmore; Woozi; Park Ki-tae	Nmore; Park Ki-tae	3:29
8.	"Back It Up" (Hip-Hop Team)	S.Coups; Wonwoo; Vernon; Mingyu	Bumzu; Anchor	Bumzu; Anchor	3:07
9.	"Lucky"	Bumzu; Woozi; Vernon; Mingyu; Seungkwan	Bumzu; Anchor; Woozi; G-high	Anchor; G-high	3:17
10.	"Snap Shoot"	Bumzu; S.Coups; Woozi; Vernon; Mingyu	Bumzu; Woozi	Bumzu; Ohway!	2:55
11.	"Happy Ending" (Korean version)	Bumzu; Woozi	Bumzu; Woozi	Bumzu; Anchor	3:28
Total length:					36:00

== Charts ==
=== Weekly charts ===
Weekly chart performance
Chart (2019)	Peak position
French Digital Albums (SNEP)	108
Japanese Albums (Oricon)	1
Japan Hot Albums (Billboard Japan)	7
Polish Albums (ZPAV)	38
South Korean Albums (Gaon)	1
US Heatseekers Albums (Billboard)	25
US World Albums (Billboard)	7

=== Year-end charts ===
Year-end chart performance
Chart (2019)	Position
Japanese Albums (Oricon)	14
South Korean Albums (Gaon)	2

Year-end chart performance
Chart (2021)	Position
South Korean Albums (Gaon)	70

Year-end chart performance
Chart (2022)	Position
South Korean Albums (Circle)	62

Year-end chart performance
Chart (2023)	Position
South Korean Albums (Circle)	90

== Certifications and sales ==
Region	Certification	Certified units/sales
Japan (RIAJ)	Gold	100,000^{^}
South Korea (KMCA)	Million	1,000,000^{^}
^{^} Shipments figures based on certification alone.

== Accolades ==
Year-end lists
Critic/Publication	List	Work	Rank	Ref.
Billboard	The 25 Best K-pop Albums of 2019	An Ode	1	
Billboard	The 25 Best K-pop Songs of 2019	"Fear"	23	
SBS PopAsia	Top 100 Asian pop songs of 2019	"Fear"	28	
BuzzFeed	Best K-pop Music Videos of 2019	"Fear"	12	
Rolling Stone India	10 Best K-pop Music Videos of 2019	"Fear"	—N/a	
CelebMix	Top 10 K-pop songs of 2019	"Fear"	9	
Dazed	The 20 best K-pop songs of 2019	"Hit"	18	
MTV	The Best K-pop B-sides of 2019	"Lie Again"	2	

Awards
Year	Organization	Award	Nominated Work	Result	Ref.
2019	Asia Artist Awards	Album of the Year	An Ode	Won	
2019	Mnet Asian Music Awards	Album of the Year	An Ode	Nominated	
2019	Mnet Asian Music Awards	Best Dance Performance – Male Group	"Fear"	Nominated	
2019	Mnet Asian Music Awards	Song of the Year	"Fear"	Longlisted	
2019	Asian Music Festival	Album of the Year	An Ode	Won	
2020	Golden Disc Awards	Disc Bonsang	An Ode	Won	
2020	Golden Disc Awards	Disc Daesang	An Ode	Nominated	
2020	Gaon Chart Music Awards	Album of the Year – 3rd Quarter	An Ode	Won	
