= Woozi =

South Korean singer-songwriter (born 1996)

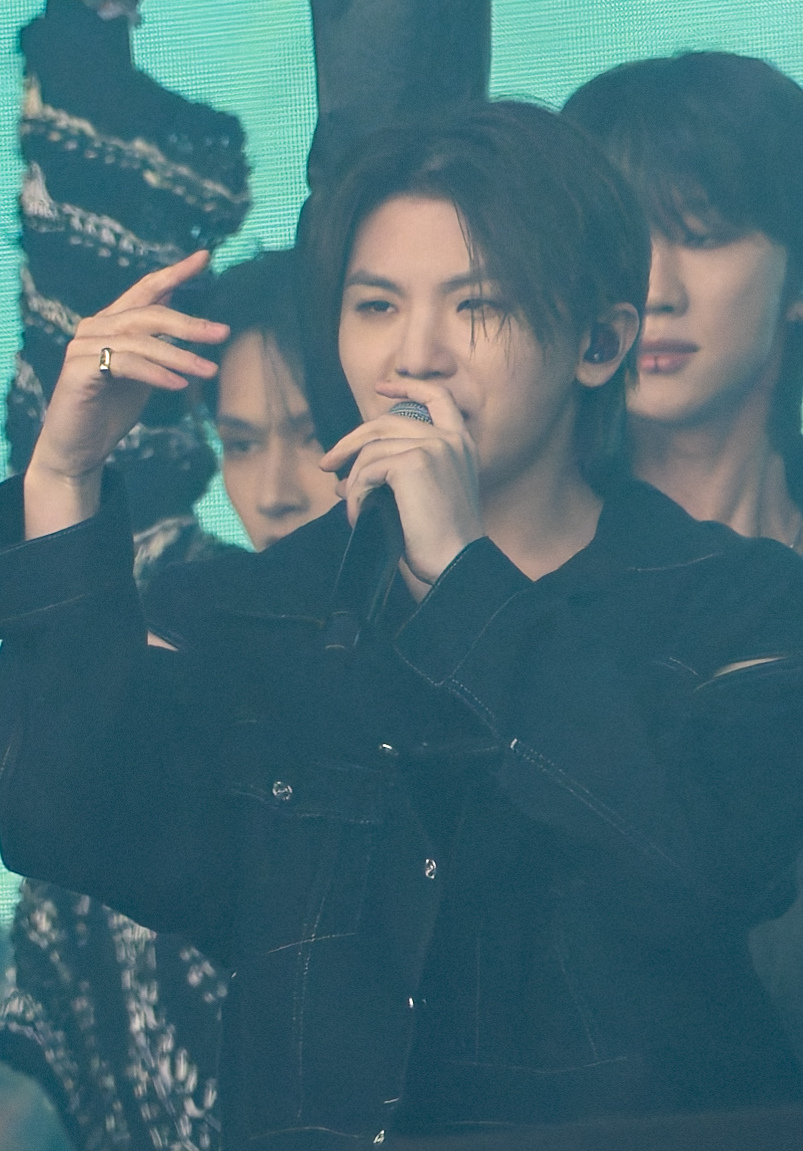
- Woozi in June 2024
- Born: Lee Ji-hoon; November 22, 1996 (age 30); Busan, South Korea
- Education: Hanyang University; Anyang University
- Occupations: Singer; songwriter; record producer
- Musical career
- Genre: K-pop
- Instrument: Vocals
- Years active: 2015–present
- Label: Pledis
- Member of: Seventeen; HxW

Korean name
- Hangul: 이지훈
- RR: I Jihun
- MR: I Chihun

Stage name
- Hangul: 우지
- RR: Uji
- MR: Uji

Lee Ji-hoon (Korean: 이지훈; born November 22, 1996), known by his stage name Woozi (우지), is a South Korean singer, songwriter and record producer. Managed by Pledis Entertainment, he is a member of the South Korean boy band Seventeen, the leader of its vocal team, and part of its subunit Hoshi X Woozi.

In 2022, he made his solo debut with "Ruby". Aside from his work as a soloist and with Seventeen, Woozi has also written for other K-pop artists such as NU'EST W, Ailee, and I.O.I.

== Early life ==
From a young age, Woozi studied classical music and learned to play the clarinet and other band instruments. He successfully auditioned for Pledis Entertainment and met labelmate Bumzu, a frequent collaborator on music production. He graduated from Hanlim Multi Art School and subsequently enrolled in Hanyang University. In 2022, he enrolled in a Master's degree at Anyang University.

== Career ==
=== 2015–present: Seventeen solo and sub-unit activities ===
On May 26, 2015, Woozi debuted in the self-producing group Seventeen with the single "Adore U". He helped write and produce every track on their debut extended play (EP) 17 Carat. He has since become Seventeen's main producer along with Bumzu and is credited for writing over 80% of the group's discography as of January 2019.

Shortly thereafter, Woozi began writing for other artists as well. In 2016, he and Ailee wrote lyrics for her collaboration with Eric Nam, "Feelin'". In 2017, Woozi wrote the last single released by the project group I.O.I, "Downpour", whose lyrics received praise. Later that year, he gifted the song "Thankful for You" (지금까지 행복했어요) to labelmate Baekho of NU'EST W, which was featured in the group's first EP W, Here. Woozi became a full member of the Korea Music Copyright Association in 2019. On October 15, 2019, Woozi released the song "Miracle" for the soundtrack of the television series The Tale of Nokdu.

In 2021, he worked with fellow Seventeen member Hoshi on the latter's song "Spider", which debuted at number five on the Billboard World Digital Song Sales chart. That year, Woozi won Best Producer at the 6th Asia Artist Awards, becoming the youngest recipient of the accolade in the show's history. He released his first mixtape, Ruby, on January 3, 2022. Its lead single, the first track he wrote entirely in the English language, reached number one on iTunes charts in at least 18 different regions, including Chile, Mexico, Indonesia, and Philippines.

On January 26, 2024, Woozi officially released the song "What Kind of Future" as a birthday gift to his late friend Moonbin, who had died the previous year.

On February 19, 2025, Pledis Entertainment announced that Woozi would be debuting in a sub-unit alongside Hoshi as Hoshi X Woozi, with the release of a single album titled Beam on March 10.

== Endorsements ==
In October 2022, Korean fashion brand Romantic Crown announced that they had selected Woozi as their brand model for their 2022 Fall/Winter collection. In March 2023, the brand collaborated with Woozi on a second collection, which featured clothing referencing "Universe Factory", Woozi's nickname for his music studio.

== Personal life ==
=== Military service ===
Woozi commenced his mandatory military service in the South Korean military on September 15, 2025, as an active duty soldier. He performed for Ground Forces Festival (also known as Army Fest), held in Gyeryong, South Chungcheong Province, on October 1–5, 2026.

== Discography ==
=== Singles ===
Title	Year	Peak chart positions	Sales	Album
Title	Year	KOR	Sales	Album
"Q&A" (with Ailee, S.Coups, and Vernon)	2015	58	KOR: 78,463	Non-album single
"YOSM" (요즈음) (Kanto featuring Woozi)	2016	99	KOR: 25,591	14216
"Ruby"	2022	—	—N/a	Non-album singles
"What Kind of Future" (어떤 미래)	2024	133	—N/a	Non-album singles
"—" denotes releases that did not chart or were not released in that region.

=== Other charted songs ===
Title	Year	Peak chart positions	Album
Title	Year	KOR	Album
"Destiny" (운명) (Note: Credited under Seventeen but is a solo track performed by Woozi.)	2025	104	Happy Burstday

=== Soundtrack appearances ===
Title	Year	Peak chart positions		Album
Title	Year	KOR	KOR Hot	Album
"A-Teen" with Joshua, Hoshi, Vernon, and Dino	2018	17	—	A-Teen OST
"Miracle"	2019	— (Note: "Miracle" did not enter the Circle Digital Chart, but it peaked at number 144 on the component download chart.)	—	The Tale of Nokdu OST
"Is It Still Beautiful" (여전히 아름다운지) with Seungkwan and DK, originally by Kim Yeon-woo	2021	25	22	Hospital Playlist OST Part 8
"—" denotes releases that did not chart or were not released in that region.

== Awards and nominations ==
Award	Year	Category	Nominee(s) / work(s)	Result	Ref.
Asia Artist Awards	2021	Best Producer	Woozi	Won	
Melon Music Awards	2017	Hot Trend Award	"Downpour" (Note: I.O.I and Woozi were nominated alongside the song as singer and producer respectively.)	Nominated	
