= List of songs written by Bumzu =

Bumzu is a South Korean songwriter and record producer. Signed to Pledis Entertainment since 2013, he is best known for working with other artists under the label, including NU'EST and Seventeen. His work with the groups has been characterized by collaboration with the members of the groups, specifically Baekho for NU'EST and Woozi for Seventeen. He has also worked with Fromis 9, Pristin and TWS.

Bumzu's first solo record was the extended play (EP) Something Special (2013), which featured five tracks all written by Bumzu alongside Climxx. He has since released two further EPs, 24 (2014) and 27 (2017), and one album, Good Life (2015), all with songs written by himself alongside various collaborators.

In 2024, he won his first award for his work, at the 9th Asia Artist Awards. He was awarded "Best Producer", an award previously won by Woozi. Later that year, he was recognised by the Korea Music Copyright Association, who awarded him a grand prize for being the highest-earning songwriter for K-pop in 2023, largely for his work with Seventeen.

== Songs ==
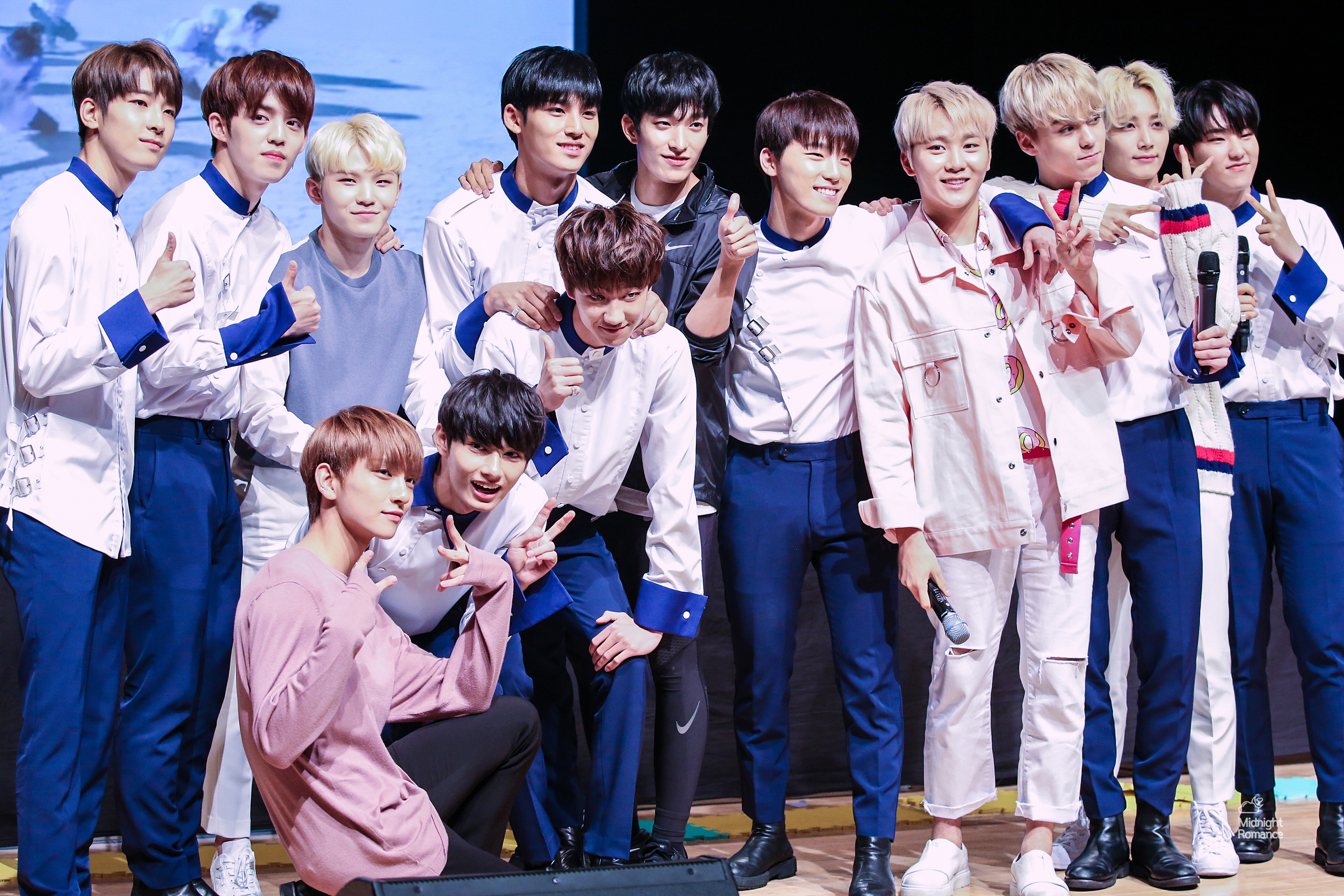
Bumzu has worked with Seventeen since their debut in 2015.

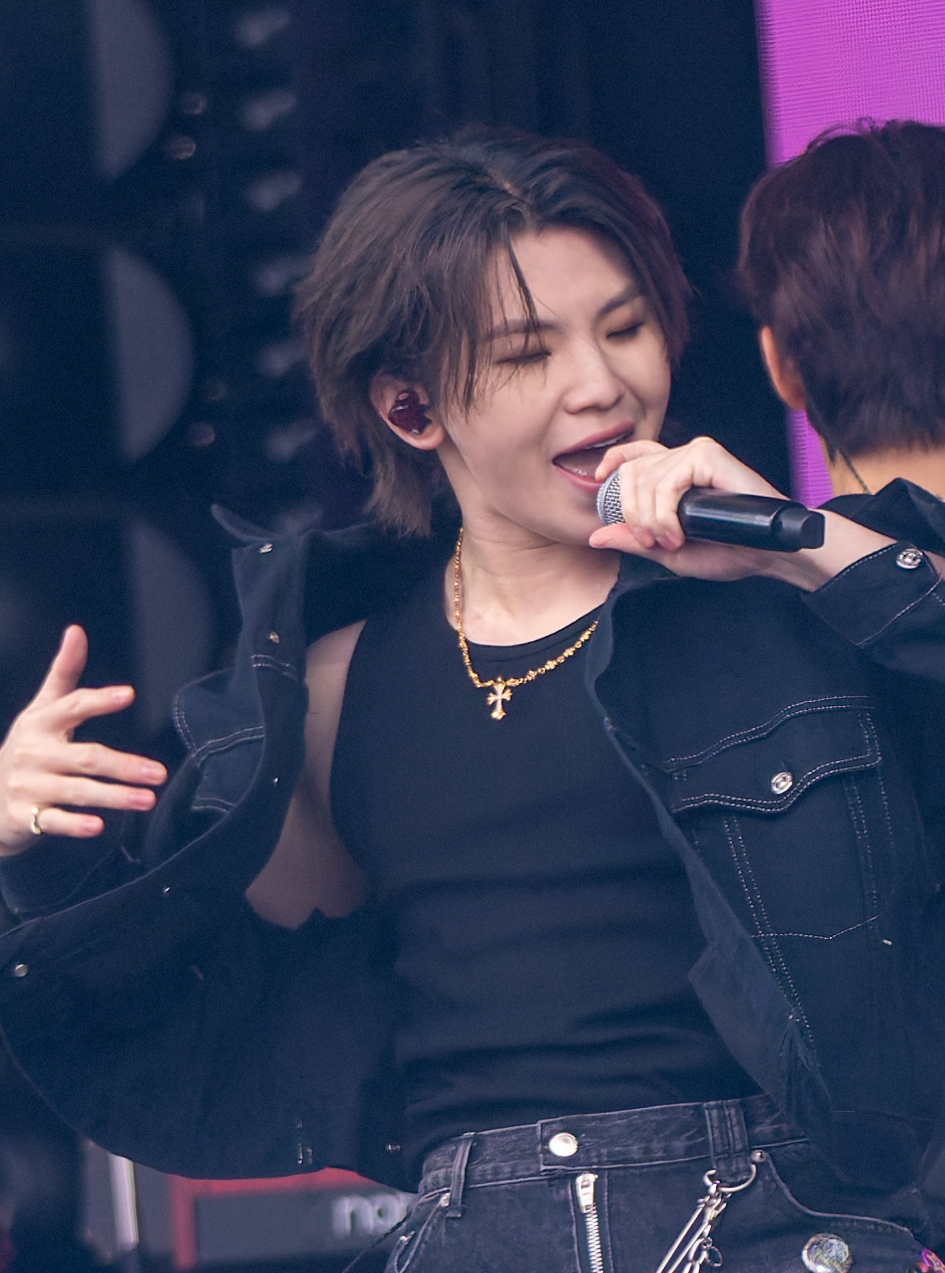
Bumzu often collaborates with Seventeen member Woozi, and penned his solo song "Destiny" for the group's 10th anniversary record Happy Burstday.

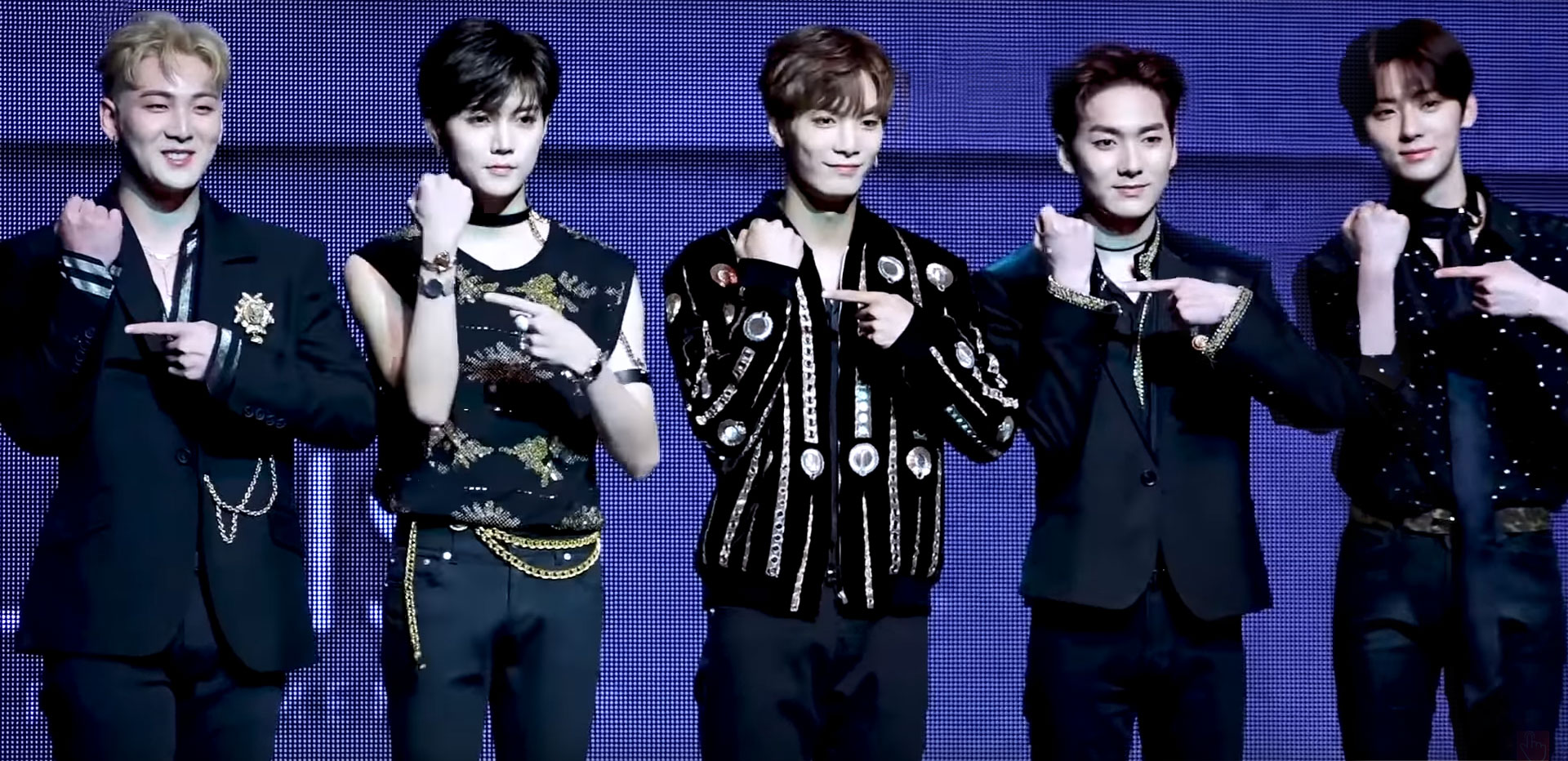
Bumzu wrote many songs with NU'EST throughout their shared time under Pledis Entertainment.

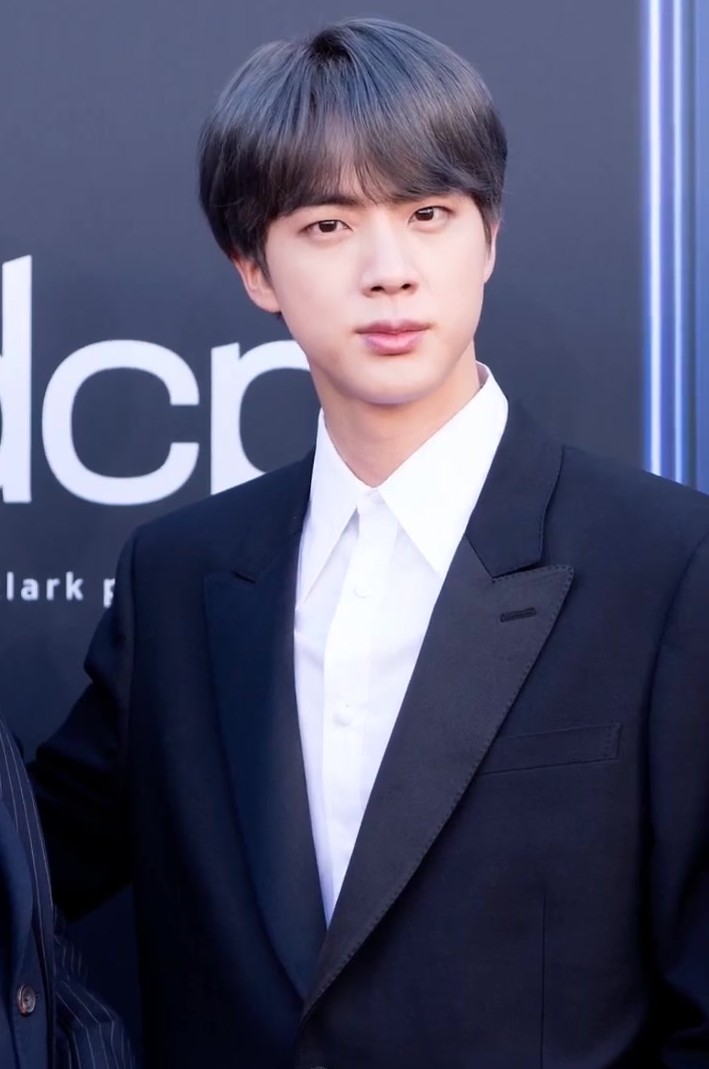
Bumzu collaborated with Jin on the latter's 2020 and 2021 singles "Abyss" and "Super Tuna".

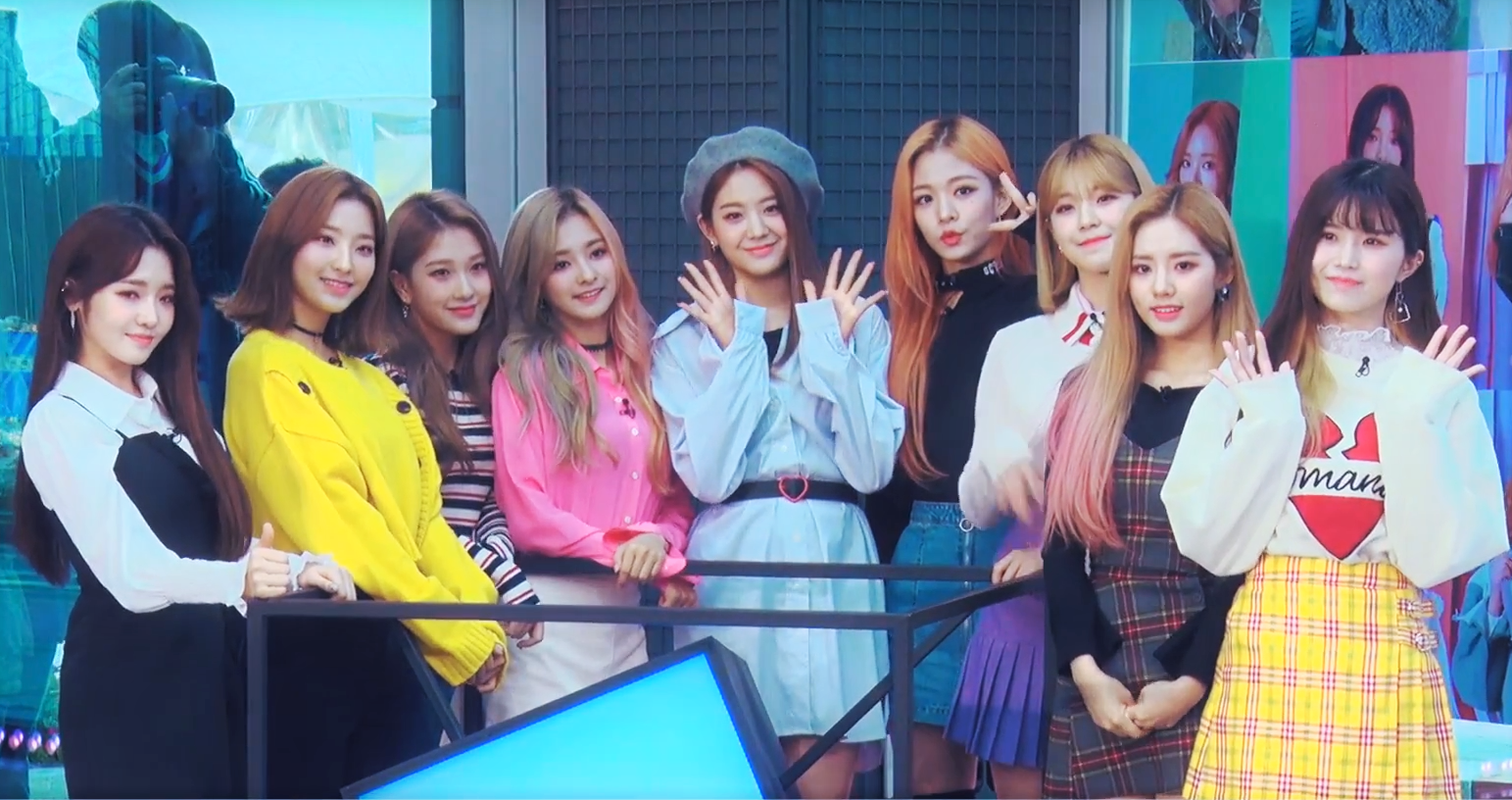
Bumzu wrote four songs for Fromis 9, including their debut song "Glass Slippers" and their hit song "Supersonic".

Key
‡	Indicates song written solely by Bumzu

Name of song, featured performers, writer(s), original release, and year of release
Song	Artist(s)	Writer(s)	Album	Year	Ref.
"0 (Zero)"	Dino	Bumzu; Dino	Non-album single	2017	
"1 to 13"	Seventeen	Bumzu; Woozi	Spill the Feels	2024	
"247"	Seventeen	Bumzu; Woozi; The8; Hoshi; Dino	An Ode	2019	
"24H"	Seventeen	Bumzu; Woozi	24H	2020	
"28.5"	Bumzu featuring Jung In	Bumzu; Lee Hae-na	24	2014	
"2Star"	Bumzu featuring Ugly Duck	Bumzu; Climxx	Something Special	2013	
"2 Minus 1"	Seventeen	Bumzu; Vernon; Joshua	Attacca	2021	
"5, 4, 3 (Pretty Woman)"	S.Coups X Mingyu featuring Lay Bankz	Bumzu; Mingyu; S.Coups; Shannon Bae; Lay Bankz; Roy Orbison; William Dees	Hype Vibes	2025	
"7PM"	BSS featuring Peder Elias	Bumzu; Woozi; Peder Elias	Second Wind	2023	
"96ers" (동갑내기)	Hoshi X Woozi	Bumzu; Woozi; Hoshi	Beam	2025	
"99%"	Bumzu	Bumzu; Climxx	Something Special	2013	
"Abyss"	Jin	Bumzu; RM; Jin; Pdogg	Non-album single	2020	
"A.C.C.E.L"	Bumzu	Bumzu ‡	27	2017	
"Adore U"	Seventeen	Bumzu; Woozi; S.Coups; Vernon	17 Carat	2015	
"Ah! Love"	Seventeen	Bumzu; Woozi; S.Coups; Jeonghan; Joshua	Semicolon	2020	
"All My Love"	Seventeen	Bumzu; Woozi; Seungkwan; Vernon	Semicolon	2020	
"Anyone"	Seventeen	Bumzu; Woozi; S.Coups	Your Choice	2021	
"April Shower"	Seventeen	Bumzu; Woozi; Softserveboy; Kareem James	FML	2023	
"Ash"	Seventeen	Bumzu; Woozi; Vernon; Robb Roy	Face the Sun	2022	
"Back 2 Back"	Seventeen	Bumzu; Woozi; Hoshi	Seventeenth Heaven	2023	
"Back to Me"	NU'EST	Bumzu; Baekho; Seo Ji-eum	The Nocturne	2020	
"Bad 4 U"	Baekho	Bumzu; Baekho; Gesture; Alex Karlsson	Absolute Zero	2022	
"Bass"	NU'EST	Bumzu; Baekho; JR	Happily Ever After	2019	
"Beautiful Monster"	JxW (Note: Solo performance by Jeonghan)	Bumzu; Woozi	This Man	2024	
"Beautiful"	Bumzu	Bumzu ‡	Good Life	2015	
"Beautiful"	Seventeen	Bumzu; Woozi; Mingyu; Dino	Going Seventeen	2016	
"Beg for You" (A. G. Cook and Vernon remix)	Charli XCX featuring Rina Sawayama	Bumzu; Vernon; Charlotte Aitchison; Rina Sawayama; Jonas Von Der Burg; Anoo Bhagavan; Niclas Von Der Burg; Alexander N Soifer; Sorana Pacurar; Nicholas Gale; Rollo Spreckley	Non-album single	2022	
"Bet Bet"	NU'EST	Bumzu; Baekho; JR	Happily Ever After	2019	
"Bingle Bangle"	Bumzu featuring Volume	Bumzu; Climxx	Something Special	2013	
"Bittersweet"	Wonwoo and Mingyu featuring Lee Hi	Bumzu; Wonwoo; Mingyu; Cho Yoon-kyeong	Non-album single	2021	
"Black"	NU'EST	Bumzu; Baekho; JR; Glenn	Romanticize	2021	
"Boom Boom" (붐붐)	Seventeen	Bumzu; Woozi; Vernon; S.Coups; Wonwoo; Mingyu	Going Seventeen	2016	
"'Bout You" (노래해)	Seventeen	Bumzu; Woozi; Park Ki-tae	Face the Sun	2022	
"Bucket List"	Bumzu featuring Vernon	Bumzu; Vernon	Good Life	2015	
"Call Call Call!"	Seventeen	Bumzu; Woozi; Yu Shimoji	We Make You	2018	
"Call Me Back"	NU'EST	Bumzu; Baekho; JR	The Table	2019	
"Campfire" (캠프파이어)	Seventeen	Bumzu; Woozi; Vernon; S.Coups; Jeonghan; Wonwoo; The8; Mingyu; DK; Seungkwan	Teen, Age	2017	
"Candy" (사탕)	Seventeen	Bumzu; Woozi	Spill the Feels	2024	
"CBZ (Prime Time)" (청바지)	BSS	Bumzu; Woozi; Hoshi; DK; Seungkwan	Teleparty	2025	
"Change Up"	Seventeen	Bumzu; Woozi; S.Coups; Hoshi	Teen, Age	2017	
"Cheers To Youth" (청춘찬가)	Seventeen	Bumzu; Woozi	17 Is Right Here	2024	
"Cheers"	Seventeen	Bumzu; Woozi; S.Coups; Hoshi; Vernon	Sector 17	2022	
"Chewing Time"	Rainbow	Bumzu; Byun Sang-won; DJ R2	Rainbow Syndrome	2013	
"Circles"	Seventeen	Bumzu; Woozi	Sector 17	2022	
"Clap" (박수)	Seventeen	Bumzu; Woozi; Vernon; Jeonghan; Hoshi; Mingyu; DK; Seungkwan	Teen, Age	2017	
"Come to me" (나에게로 와)	Seventeen	Bumzu; Woozi	You Make My Day	2018	
"Crazy in Love"	Seventeen	Bumzu; Woozi; Vernon; S.Coups; Mingyu	Al1	2017	
"Crush"	Seventeen	Bumzu; Woozi; Vernon; Higher Baby; Analise Hoveyda	Attacca	2021	
"Darl+ing"	Seventeen	Bumzu; Woozi; Shannon	Face the Sun	2022	
"Destiny" (운명)	Seventeen (Note: Solo performance by Woozi)	Bumzu ‡	Happy Burstday	2025	
"Diamond Days"	Seventeen	Bumzu; Woozi; S.Coups; Vernon; Jeon Gan-di	Seventeenth Heaven	2023	
"Different"	NU'EST	Bumzu; Baekho; JR	Happily Ever After	2019	
"DKDK" (Note: Also known in English as "Pit A Pat") (두근두근)	Fromis 9	Bumzu (Note: Credited as Baekgom); Kang Dong-ho; Song Ha-young; Baek Ji-heon; Lee Seo-yeon	To. Day	2018	
"Do Re Mi" (도레미)	Seventeen	Bumzu; Woozi; Seungkwan; Vernon; Dino	Semicolon	2020	
"Domino"	Seventeen	Bumzu; Woozi; Mingyu; Sara Davis; Cameron Walker; Jordan Witzigreuter	Face the Sun	2022	
"Doom Doom"	NU'EST (Note: Solo performance by JR)	Bumzu; JR	Romanticize	2021	
"Don Quixote"	Seventeen	Bumzu; Woozi; Wonwoo; Michel "Lindgren" Schulz; Melanie Fontana	Face the Sun	2022	
"Don't Know Why" (왜이래)	Bumzu	Bumzu ‡	Good Life	2015	
"Don't Wanna Cry" (울고 싶지 않아)	Seventeen	Bumzu; Woozi; Vernon; Hoshi; Jeonghan	Al1	2017	
"Don't Wanna Go"	NU'EST	Bumzu; Baekho	Romanticize	2021	
"Double Take"	TWS	Bumzu (Note: Credited as Wasurenai); Jeon Jin; Im Soo-ran; Kim Hye-jeong; Rizin; Park Hyun-jung; MLC; Ronnie Icon; Willie Weeks	Summer Beat!	2024	
"Dress"	NU'EST	Bumzu; Baekho; Jay & Rudy; Glenn	Romanticize	2021	
"Drive"	NU'EST	Bumzu; Baekho; JR	Romanticize	2021	
"Dust" (먼지)	Seventeen	Bumzu; Woozi	FML	2023	
"Earth"	S.Coups X Mingyu	Bumzu; Mingyu; S.Coups	Hype Vibes	2025	
"Earphone"	NU'EST (Note: Solo performance by Minhyun)	Bumzu; Minhyun	Romanticize	2021	
"Eyes on You"	Seventeen	Bumzu; Woozi; S.Coups; Vernon	Spill the Feels	2024	
"Falling for U"	Seventeen	Bumzu; Woozi; Jeonghan; Joshua	Director's Cut	2017	
"Fear"	Seventeen	Bumzu; Woozi; Vernon; S.Coups	An Ode	2019	
"Fearless"	Seventeen	Bumzu; Woozi; Vernon	Heng:garæ	2020	
"Feels"	NU'EST W (Note: Solo performance by Baekho)	Bumzu; Baekho	Wake, N	2018	
"Festival in My Car"	Baekho	Bumzu; Baekho; Glenn; Nmore	Absolute Zero	2022	
"Fiesta"	S.Coups X Mingyu	Bumzu; Mingyu; S.Coups; Jake K; Andreas Oberg; Christoffer Jonsson	Hype Vibes	2025	
"Fine"	NU'EST	Bumzu; Baekho; JR	Happily Ever After	2019	
"Fire"	Seventeen	Bumzu; Woozi; S.Coups; Wonwoo; Mingyu; Vernon	FML	2023	
"Firework"	NU'EST	Bumzu; Baekho; JR; Doubletenboy	The Nocturne	2020	
"Flower"	Seventeen	Bumzu; Woozi; S.Coups; Wonwoo; The8; Jeonghan; Dino; Seungkwan	Teen, Age	2017	
"For You"	S.Coups X Mingyu	Bumzu; Mingyu; S.Coups; Melanie Fontana; Jack Samson; GG Ramirez; Lindgren	Hype Vibes	2025	
"Fighting" (파이팅 해야지)	BSS featuring Lee Young-ji	Bumzu; Woozi; Hoshi; DK; Seungkwan; Lee Young-ji	Second Wind	2023	
"F*ck My Life"	Seventeen	Bumzu; Woozi	FML	2023	
"Gam3 Bo1"	Seventeen	Bumzu; Woozi; S.Coups; Wonwoo; Mingyu; Vernon	Your Choice	2021	
"Getting Closer"	Seventeen	Bumzu; Woozi; Hoshi	You Made My Dawn	2019	
"Give It 2 U"	Bumzu featuring P.O and Niihwa	Bumzu; P.O; Niihwa	Good Life	2015	
"Glass Slippers" (유리구두)	Fromis 9	Bumzu ‡	Non-album single	2018	
"God of Music" (음악의신)	Seventeen	Bumzu; Woozi; S.Coups; Mingyu; Vernon	Seventeenth Heaven	2023	
"Good Life"	Bumzu featuring Dok2 and The Quiett	Bumzu; Dok2; The Quiett; Mr Gordo	Good Life	2015	
"Good to Me"	Seventeen	Bumzu; Woozi	You Made My Dawn	2019	
"Happy Alone"	BSS	Bumzu; Woozi; Hoshi; DK; Seungkwan	Teleparty	2023	
"HBD"	Seventeen	Bumzu; Woozi	Happy Burstday	2025	
"Headliner"	Seventeen	Bumzu; Woozi	Seventeenth Heaven	2023	
"Heaven's Cloud"	Seventeen	Bumzu; Woozi; S.Coups; Mingyu	Your Choice	2021	
"Hello"	Seventeen	Bumzu; Mingyu; DK; Jun	Teen, Age	2017	
"Hello I'm Bum Zu" (Hello 난 범주야)	Bumzu	Bumzu; Climxx	Something Special	2013	
"Help Me"	NU'EST W	Bumzu; Baekho; JR	Wake, N	2018	
"Hey Buddy"	Seventeen	Bumzu; Woozi; DK; Mingyu; The8	Semicolon	2020	
"Hey! Hey!"	TWS	Bumzu; Glenn; Choi Bo-ra; Song Ji-yu; Jang Min-woo	Summer Beat!	2024	
"High"	Bumzu	Bumzu ‡	27	2017	
"Highlight"	Seventeen	Bumzu; Hoshi; Dino; Jun; The8; Lee Yoo-jung	Going Seventeen	2016	
"Hit"	Seventeen	Bumzu; Woozi; Vernon	An Ode	2019	
"Hit Song"	Seventeen	Bumzu; Woozi; Mingyu; Vernon; Dino	Love & Letter	2016	
"Holiday"	Seventeen	Bumzu; Woozi; S.Coups; Wonwoo	You Make My Day	2018	
"Home"	Seventeen	Bumzu; Woozi	You Made My Dawn	2019	
"Home;Run"	Seventeen	Bumzu; Woozi; Seungkwan; Vernon	Semicolon	2020	
"Hot"	Seventeen	Bumzu; Woozi; August Rigo; Ploypaworawan Praison	Face the Sun	2022	
"I Can't Run Away" (그리워하는 것까지)	Seventeen	Bumzu; Woozi; S.Coups; Wonwoo; Mingyu; Vernon	Attacca	2021	
"I Don't Understand But I Luv U"	Seventeen	Bumzu; Woozi; Hoshi; Dino	FML	2023	
"I Hate You"	NU'EST W	Bumzu; JR	Wake, N	2018	
"I Need You" (Ya해)	Bumzu	Bumzu; Baekho	Good Life	2015	
"I Wish" (좋겠다)	Seventeen	Bumzu; Woozi; Hwang Hyun; Wonwoo	Heng:garæ	2020	
"If I'm S, Can You Be My N?" (내가 S면 넌 나의 N이 되어줘)	TWS	Bumzu; Jeon Jin; Glenn; Brother Su; Haon	Summer Beat!	2024	
"If We" (우리가 사랑했다면)	NU'EST	Bumzu; Baekho	The Table	2019	
"If You Leave Me"	Seventeen	Bumzu; Woozi; S.Coups; Hoshi; Nmore	Face the Sun	2022	
"Ima (Even If the World Ends Tomorrow)" (今 -明日 世界が終わっても-)	Seventeen	Bumzu; Woozi; Barbora	Always Yours	2023	
"Imperfect Love" (매일 그대라서 행복하다)	Seventeen	Bumzu; Woozi	Attacca	2021	
"Inside Out"	NU'EST	Bumzu; Baekho; JR; G-High; Inner Child	Romanticize	2021	
"Intro. 新世界 (New World)"	Seventeen	Bumzu; Woozi	Teen, Age	2017	
"I'm Good" (아무렇지 않아)	Bumzu featuring Sik-K	Bumzu; Sik-K	27	2017	
"I'm in Trouble"	NU'EST	Bumzu; Baekho	The Nocturne	2020	
"Just"	Bumzu	Bumzu; G-High	27	2017	
"Kidult" (어른 아이)	Seventeen	Bumzu; Woozi; Vernon; S.Coups	Heng:garæ	2020	
"Lalali"	Seventeen	Bumzu; Woozi; S.Coups; Wonwoo; Mingyu; Vernon	17 Is Right Here	2024	
"Last Night" (어젯밤)	JxW	Bumzu; Woozi	This Man	2024	
"Left & Right"	Seventeen	Bumzu; Woozi; Vernon	Heng:garæ	2020	
"Lean on Me" (기대)	Seventeen	Bumzu; S.Coups; Vernon; Wonwoo; Mingyu	Going Seventeen	2016	
"Leftover" (휴지통)	JxW (Note: Solo performance by Wonwoo)	Bumzu; Woozi; Wonwoo	This Man	2024	
"Let Me Hear You Say"	Seventeen	Bumzu; Woozi; Mingyu; S.Coups; Vernon	An Ode	2019	
"L.I.E"	NU'EST W	Bumzu; Baekho; JR	Wake, N	2018	
"Lie Again" (거짓말을 해)	Seventeen	Bumzu; Woozi; Mingyu; S.Coups; Vernon	An Ode	2019	
"Light a Flame" (마음에 불을 지펴)	Seventeen	Bumzu; Woozi; Hoshi; Wonwoo	Semicolon	2020	
"Lilili Yabbay" (13월의 춤)	Seventeen	Bumzu; Woozi; Dino	Teen, Age	2017	
"Love Burn"	Baekho	Bumzu; Baekho; Jenci	Absolute Zero	2022	
"Love Me"	NU'EST	Bumzu; Baekho; JR	The Table	2019	
"Love, Money, Fame"	Seventeen featuring DJ Khaled	Bumzu; Woozi; Vernon; Robb Roy	Spill the Feels	2024	
"Love RumPumPum"	Fromis 9	Bumzu; Woozi (Note: Credited as Baekgu)	Fun Factory	2019	
"Love Song" (사랑 노래)	BSS	Bumzu; Woozi; Hoshi; DK; Seungkwan	Teleparty	2023	
"Lucky"	Seventeen	Bumzu; Woozi; Vernon; Mingyu; Seungkwan	An Ode	2019	
"Lunch"	BSS	Bumzu; Woozi; Hoshi; DK; Seungkwan	Second Wind	2023	
"Maestro"	Seventeen	Bumzu; Woozi	17 Is Right Here	2024	
"March"	Seventeen	Bumzu; Woozi; Park Ki-tae	Face the Sun	2022	
"Makeup & Tears" (화장을 하다 울었어)	After School	Bumzu ‡	First Love	2013	
"Me" (난)	S.Coups	Bumzu; S.Coups	Non-album single	2023	
"Miss U" (노래할 기분이 아니야)	Bumzu	Bumzu ‡	24	2014	
"Monday to Saturday"	Seventeen	Bumzu; Woozi; S.Coups; Vernon; Mingyu; Wonwoo	Love & Letter	2016	
"Monster"	Seventeen	Bumzu; Woozi; S.Coups; Wonwoo; Mingyu; Vernon	Seventeenth Heaven	2023	
"Moonwalker"	Seventeen	Bumzu; Woozi; Hoshi; Dino	You Make My Day	2018	
"Moon Dance"	NU'EST	Bumzu; Baekho; JR	The Nocturne	2020	
"Must"	NU'EST	Bumzu; Baekho; Ren	The Nocturne	2020	
"My I"	Seventeen	Bumzu; Jun; The8	Al1	2017	
"My My"	Seventeen	Bumzu; Woozi; Vernon; S.Coups	Heng:garæ	2020	
"Need It"	NU'EST	Bumzu; Baekho	Romanticize	2021	
"Network Love"	Seventeen	Bumzu; Woozi; The8; Vernon	An Ode	2019	
"No Rules"	Baekho	Bumzu; Baekho; Lee Seu-ran; Krysta Youngs; Howard Fleetwood	Absolute Zero	2022	
"Not Alone"	Seventeen	Bumzu; Woozi	Non-album single	2021	
"Oh My!" (어쩌나)	Seventeen	Bumzu; Woozi; S.Coups; Vernon	You Make My Day	2018	
"Oh Mymy: 7s"	TWS	Bumzu; Shannon; Jeon Jin; Haon	Sparkling Blue	2024	
"Once" (한 때)	Bumzu featuring Raina	Bumzu; Raina	27	2017	
"One Two Three"	NU'EST	Bumzu; Minhyun; Baekho; JR	The Table	2019	
"Our Dawn Is Hotter Than Day" (우리의 새벽은 낮보다 뜨겁다)	Seventeen	Bumzu; Woozi; S.Coups; Wonwoo; Vernon; Mingyu	You Make My Day	2018	
"Pang!"	Seventeen	Bumzu; Woozi; Hoshi; Dino	Attacca	2021	
"Pinocchio"	Hoshi X Woozi featuring So!Yoon!	Bumzu; Woozi; Hoshi; Jintae Ko; David Brook; Jimmy Burney	Beam	2025	
"Plot Twist" (첫 만남은 계획대로 되지 않아)	TWS	Bumzu; Brother Su; Jeon Jin; BuildingOwner; Glenn	Sparkling Blue	2024	
"Pretty U" 예쁘다	Seventeen	Bumzu; Woozi; S.Coups; Vernon; Seungkwan	Love & Letter	2016	
"Rain"	Seventeen	Bumzu; Woozi; Hoshi; Dino	Spill the Feels	2024	
"Ready to Love"	Seventeen	Bumzu; Woozi; S.Coups; Mingyu; Danke; "Hitman" Bang; Kyler Niko	Your Choice	2021	
"Rock with You"	Seventeen	Bumzu; Woozi; Vernon; Joshua; Kim In-hyun; Jordan Witzigreuter; Cameron Walker; Tim Tan	Attacca	2021	
"Run to You" (지금 널 찾아가고 있어)	Seventeen	Bumzu; Woozi	Director's Cut	2017	
"Same Dream, Same Mind, Same Night" (같은 꿈, 같은 맘, 같은 밤)	Seventeen	Bumzu; Woozi	Your Choice	2021	
"Sara Sara"	Seventeen	Bumzu; Woozi; Barbora	Always Yours	2023	
"Second Life"	Seventeen	Bumzu; Woozi	An Ode	2019	
"Secret Love" (잠깐 나올래)	Bumzu featuring 8Dro	Bumzu; Paldro; Moonbyul	Good Life	2015	
"Segno"	NU'EST	Bumzu; Baekho; JR	Happily Ever After	2019	
"Shadow"	Seventeen	Bumzu; Woozi; Dino; Arcades; Johan Fransson; Ryan Lawrie; Matt Thomson; Max Lynedoch Graham; Gabriel Brandes	Face the Sun	2022	
"Shhh"	Seventeen	Bumzu; Hoshi; Dino	You Made My Dawn	2019	
"Shohikigen" (消費期限)	Seventeen	Bumzu; Woozi; Barbora	Non-album single	2024	
"Shooting Star"	NU'EST	Bumzu; Baekho; JR	The Nocturne	2020	
"Snap Shoot"	Seventeen	Bumzu; Woozi; Vernon; S.Coups; Mingyu	An Ode	2019	
"Something Special"	Bumzu featuring Dok2	Bumzu; Team M49; Dok2	Something Special	2013	
"SOS"	Seventeen	Bumzu; Woozi; Shannon	Seventeenth Heaven	2023	
"Space" (끝이 안보여)	Seventeen	Bumzu; Woozi; S.Coups; Vernon	Love & Letter Repackage	2016	
"Spell"	Seventeen	Bumzu; Woozi; Hoshi; Dino	17 Is Right Here	2024	
"Spider"	Hoshi	Bumzu; Woozi; Hoshi	Non-album single	2020	
"Stay Up All Night" (밤새)	NU'EST	Bumzu; Baekho; JR	The Table	2019	
"Stupid Idiot"	Hoshi X Woozi	Bumzu; Woozi; Hoshi; Pink Slip	Beam	2025	
"Super" (손오공)	Seventeen	Bumzu; Woozi; S.Coups; Vernon	FML	2023	
"Supersonic"	Fromis 9	Bumzu; Cho Su-jin; Zaya; Hong Eun-hui; Maryjane; Jeong Eun-gi; Joel Malka; Josh McClelland; Louise Frick Sveen	Supersonic	2024	
"Super Tuna" (슈퍼 참치)	Jin	Bumzu; Jin	Non-album single	2021	
"Swimming Fool"	Seventeen	Bumzu; Woozi; Vernon; Dino	Al1	2017	
"Talk About Love"	NU'EST	Bumzu; Baekho; JR	Happily Ever After	2019	
"Thanks" (고맙다)	Seventeen	Bumzu; Woozi; Hoshi	Director's Cut	2017	
"Thinkin' About You"	Seventeen	Bumzu; Woozi; Vernon; S.Coups; Wonwoo; Mingyu	Director's Cut	2017	
"Thunder"	Seventeen	Bumzu; Woozi	Happy Burstday	2025	
"Tiger Power" (호랑이 Power)	Hoshi	Bumzu; Glenn; Hoshi	Non-album single	2021	
"To You" (소용돌이)	Seventeen	Bumzu; Woozi	Attacca	2021	
"Together" (같이 가요)	Seventeen	Bumzu; Woozi; S.Coups; Hoshi; Wonwoo	Heng:garæ	2020	
"TTT" (퉤퉤퉤)	Bumzu featuring New Champ and Nucksal	Bumzu; New Champ; Nucksal	Good Life	2015	
"Very Nice" (아주 Nice)	Seventeen	Bumzu; Woozi; S.Coups; Vernon	Love & Letter Repackage	2016	
"Wanna Go Back" (변했다고 느끼는 내가 변한 건지)	Baekho featuring Sik-K	Bumzu; Baekho; Sik-K; Elum; Glenn; Nmore; Buildingowner	Absolute Zero	2022	
"Water"	Seventeen	Bumzu; Vernon; S.Coups; Wonwoo; Mingyu	Spill the Feels	2024	
"Wave"	Seventeen	Bumzu; Woozi; Hoshi; Jun; The8; Dino	Your Choice	2021	
"We Don't Care No More"	Baekho featuring June One	Bumzu; June One	Absolute Zero	2022	
"Wee Woo"	Pristin	Bumzu; Sungyeon; Sophia Pae; Gustav Karlstrom	Hi! Pristin	2017	
"What About Me"	Bumzu featuring Huckleberry P	Bumzu; Lee Hae-na	24	2014	
"When I'm Down" (미생)	Bumzu featuring Yoon Han	Bumzu ‡	24	2014	
"_World"	Seventeen	Bumzu; Woozi; S.Coups; Vernon; Melanie Fontana; Michael "Lindgren" Schulz	Sector 17	2022	
"Wi-Fi"	NU'EST W (Note: Solo performance by Aron)	Bumzu; Baekho; Aron	Wake, N	2018	
"Without You" (모자를 눌러 쓰고)	Seventeen	Bumzu; Woozi; Vernon; S.Coups; Jeonghan; Hoshi; The8; Mingyu; DK; Dino	Teen, Age	2017	
"Worth It"	S.Coups X Mingyu	Bumzu; Mingyu; S.Coups	Hype Vibes	2025	
"Yeh Yeh" (스물넷 때가 타)	Bumzu featuring Don Mills	Bumzu; Don Mills	24	2014	
"You & I"	NU'EST W (Note: Solo performance by Ren)	Bumzu; Ren	Wake, N	2018	
"Young Again"	S.Coups X Mingyu	Bumzu; Mingyu; S.Coups; Melanie Fontana; Jack Samson; GG Ramirez; Lindgren	Hype Vibes	2025	
