= Don't Wanna Cry (Seventeen song) =

Single by Seventeen

from the EP Al1
- Language: Korean
- Released: May 22, 2017
- Genre: EDM; electropop
- Length: 3:23
- Label: Pledis
- Songwriters: Woozi; S.Coups; Hoshi; Jeonghan; Bumzu; Andrew Taggart; Guy Berryman; Jonny Buckland; Will Champion; Chris Martin
- Producers: Woozi; Bumzu

Seventeen singles chronology
"Boom Boom" (2016)	"Don't Wanna Cry" (2017)	"Clap" (2017)

"Don't Wanna Cry" (Korean: 울고 싶지 않아; RR: Ulgo Sipji Ana) is a song released by South Korean boy band Seventeen on May 22, 2017, as the lead single from their EP Al1.

== Composition ==
Even before the “Don’t Wanna Cry” comeback, there were a lot of thoughts going through our heads because this release was a very different sound from what we released so far. We wondered how our fans and the public would react, and if they would even like it.

— DK on departing from previous musical genres, Teen Vogue

"Don't Wanna Cry" is a major departure from the group's previous singles, which consisted mainly of lighthearted, upbeat love songs. The lyrics describe post-breakup feelings of heartbreak and loneliness. Additionally, it incorporated elements of EDM and electropop and was less influenced by hip hop than their previous work.

== Music video ==
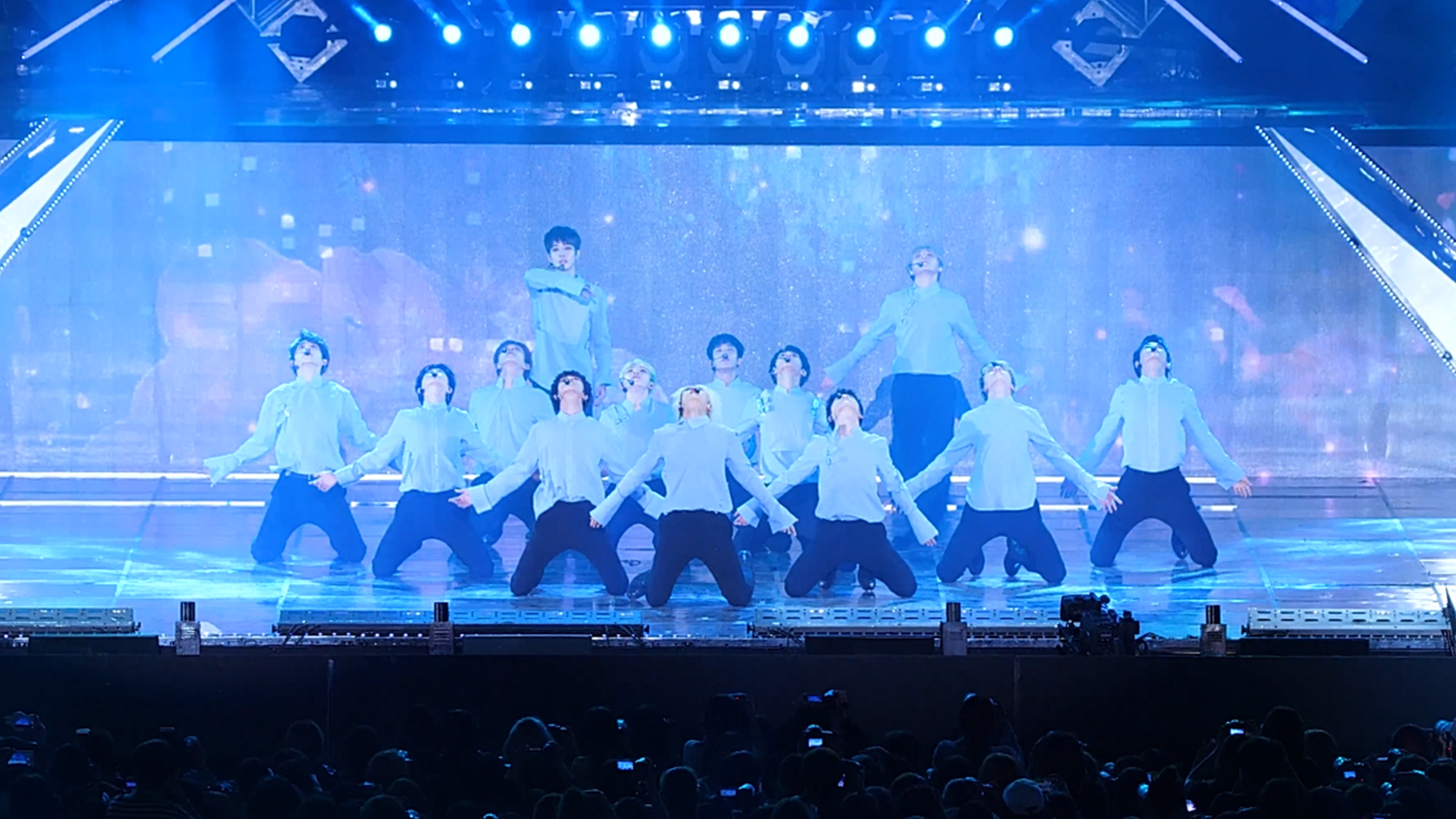
Seventeen performing Don't Wanna Cry at the Dream concert in 2017

The music video for "Don't Wanna Cry" was released on May 22, 2017. Depicting the group melancholically expressing their regrets at the end of a relationship, the music video was filmed in various locations across Los Angeles, USA.

== Reception and plagiarism controversy ==
"Don't Wanna Cry" was praised by critics as a transition to a more mature sound for the group. It won Best Dance Performance for a male group at the 2017 Mnet Asian Music Awards and reached number one on the Korea Hot music chart. Due to plagiarism concerns and criticism about the song's similarity to "Something Just Like This", Seventeen gave Coldplay and the Chainsmokers copyright credit, although Pledis Entertainment, Seventeen's record label, maintains the song was "independently created" and the move was to protect the artists from potential legal issues.

== Accolades ==
At the 2017 Mnet Asian Music Awards, "Don't Wanna Cry" was nominated for Best Music Video and Best Dance Performance – Male Group, winning the latter award.

Music program awards
Program	Date	Ref.
The Show	May 30, 2017	
The Show	June 13, 2017	
Music Bank	June 2, 2017	
Show Champion	June 7, 2017	
Show Champion	June 14, 2017	
M Countdown	June 15, 2017	

== Charts ==
Weekly chart performance
Chart (2017)	Peak position
South Korea (Gaon Digital Chart)	12
South Korea (K-pop Hot 100)	1
US World Digital Songs (Billboard)	3

== Certifications ==
Certifications
Region	Certification	Certified units/sales
Japan (RIAJ)	Gold	50,000,000^{†}
^{†} Streaming-only figures based on certification alone.
