= Supersonic (single album) =

- Digital cover

Single album by Fromis 9
- Released: August 12, 2024
- Length: 9:17
- Language: Korean
- Labels: Pledis; YG Plus

Fromis 9 chronology
Unlock My World (2023)	Supersonic (2024)	From Our 20's (2025)

Singles from Supersonic
- 1. "Supersonic" Released: August 12, 2024

Supersonic is the fifth single album by South Korean girl group Fromis 9, featuring three songs including the lead single of the same name. It was released by Pledis Entertainment on August 12, 2024.

== Background and release ==
In May 2024, Fromis 9 member Chaeyoung went live on the fan community platform Weverse, talking about frustrations of the lack of group activities since the release of Unlock My World in June 2023. In response, Pledis Entertainment shared that the group had begun working on new music and would be performing at a number of music festivals throughout summer 2024.

At the end of May, the label had confirmed a release date in August for new music, which would follow the release of a photo book and corresponding exhibition in June. On July 19, the label announced the release of a single album titled Supersonic, to be released August 12.

On July 25, the tracklist for the album was released, outlining the three tracks that would make up the album. On July 26, concept photos for the album were released, depicting a theme of midsummer heat. Snippets for all three songs were released August 6, six days ahead of the album's release.

== Music ==
"Supersonic" is described as a Miami bass song with "a harmonious blend of heavy bass and fast-paced beats", and "sensual melody on top of a fast-tempo beat". It is described as “somewhat a departure from their previous summer releases, trading the ‘more refreshing and brighter vibes’ for ‘powerful, fiery energy’.” One of the members, Park Jiwon, detailed that they had faced some difficulties when first recording the track, but were happy with the results after multiple attempts.

"Beat the Heat" has been described as a funky, "summer" song, and was conceived at a songwriting camp. Gisselle Acevedo, one of the song's writers, revealed the track was originally intended to be the lead single, saying that they wanted "this summer, beachy vibe", and "a fun summer song." Before revisions, the chorus ("Be-be-beat the heat") was intended to be the post chorus, before it was flipped around. The song included songwriting contributions from Fromis 9 member Park Jiwon.

"Take a Chance" is a synthpop-driven, euphoric pop song, with writing contributions from members Lee Saerom, Park Jiwon and Lee Seoyeon.

== Promotion ==
On August 12, Fromis 9 performed "Supersonic" for the first time, at the Show! Music Core Summer Festival in Ulsan. On August 14 they hosted a comeback special via Weverse where the group explained the new songs, described their experience shooting the new music video, and completed choreography challenges.

From August 15 to 21, they held a pop-up store at the Hyundai Seoul for the album, selling lucky draw photocards and other merchandise.

== Track listing ==
Supersonic track listing
No.	Title	Lyrics	Music	Length
1.	"Supersonic"	Cho Su-jin; Zaya (153/Joombas); Hong Eun-hui (Jam Factory); Maryjane (Lalala Studio); Jeong Eun-gi (Lalala Studio); Bumzu; Joel Malka; Josh McClelland; Louise Frick Sveen	Bumzu; Malka; McClelland; Sveen; Jin Jeon; Hwang Jae-hyeon	2:54
2.	"Beat the Heat"	Cho; Park Jiwon; Annalise Morelli (Lyre); Gisselle Acevedo (Lyre)	Xxie (Note: Also credited with arrangement.); Ondine; Morelli; Acevedo; Jin-sol	2:54
3.	"Take a Chance"	Lee Saerom; Park; Lee Seoyeon; Didrik Thott; Sebastian Thott; Ellen Berg; Moa "Cazzi Opeia" Carlebecker	Thott; Thott; Berg; Carlebecker	3:29
Total length:				9:17

== Charts ==
=== Weekly charts ===
Weekly chart performance for Supersonic
Chart (2024)	Peak position
Japan (Oricon)	16
Japan Top Singles Sales (Billboard Japan)	19
South Korean Albums (Circle)	1

=== Monthly charts ===
Monthly chart performance for Supersonic
Chart (2024)	Peak position
South Korean Albums (Circle)	9

== Release history ==
Release history for Supersonic
Region	Date	Format	Label
Various	August 12, 2024	Digital download; streaming	Pledis
South Korea	August 12, 2024	CD	Pledis; YG Plus
Japan	August 28, 2024	CD	Hybe Japan
