= Clap (Seventeen song) =

2017 single by Seventeen

Single by Seventeen

from the album Teen, Age
- Language: Korean
- Released: November 6, 2017
- Genre: K-pop; Pop rock
- Length: 2:48
- Label: Pledis
- Composers: Woozi; Bumzu; Park Ki-tae
- Lyricists: Woozi; Bumzu; Park; Jeonghan; Hoshi; Mingyu; DK; Seungkwan

Seventeen singles chronology
"Don't Wanna Cry" (2017)	"Clap" (2017)	"Call Call Call!" (2018)

Music video
- "Clap" on YouTube

"Clap" (Korean: 박수; RR: Baksu) is a song by South Korean boy group Seventeen. It was released as the lead single from their second studio album Teen, Age on November 6, 2017.

== Background and release ==
In October 2017, Pledis Entertainment revealed that Seventeen would be releasing their second studio album titled Teen, Age. The full track list was revealed on October 28, with "Clap" serving as the album's lead single.

On November 7, Seventeen first performed "Clap" on a special broadcast by Mnet, alongside other songs from Teen, Age.

== Composition ==
"Clap" is an upbeat song, while it spans a lot of meanings. The song shows how a boy, who has been living in solitude, grows up by stepping into a bigger world.

— Woozi on the song's meaning, Korea Herald

The lyrics for "Clap" were written by Seventeen members Woozi, Jeonghan, Hoshi, Mingyu, DK and Seungkwan, alongside regular collaborators Park Ki-tae of Prismfilter and Bumzu.

"Clap" has been described as a pop rock song, with a "gritty" guitar riff underscoring the song's chorus. It was composed by Woozi, Bumzu and Park, in the key of G♯ major with a tempo of 100 beats per minute.

== Music video ==
The music video for "Clap" was released on the same day as Teen, Age. It was directed by VM Project Architecture, and features the members of the group planning and editing their own music videos. Within one month, the video had reached 10 million views on YouTube, a milestone that Seventeen celebrated by releasing a commentary video breaking down the behind the scenes content of making the music video. In 2021 it became Seventeen's second music video to surpass 100 million views, after "Don't Wanna Cry", four years after its release.

== Reception ==
Critics noticed the return to Seventeen's earlier sound with "Clap", in contrast to the group's previous release "Don't Wanna Cry". Jung Yu-na reviewed the song for IZM, describing it as having a "masculine and powerful aura", and commended the use of guitar riffs during moments without singing or rapping.

== Accolades ==
On South Korean music programs, "Clap" won two first place awards.

Music program awards for "Clap"
Program	Date	Ref.
Music Bank	November 17, 2017	
Show Champion	November 15, 2017	

== Credits and personnel ==
Credits adapted from the Teen, Age lyric book.

Location

- Recorded at Ingrid Studio and 4420AZIT
- Mixed at Pledis Studio
- Edited at Ingrid Studio

Credits and personnel

- Bumzu – lyrics, composition, arrangement, chorus, synthesizer, recording
- Woozi – lyrics, composition
- Jeonghan – lyrics
- Hoshi – lyrics
- Mingyu – lyrics
- DK – lyrics
- Seungkwan – lyrics
- Park Ki-tae – lyrics, composition, arrangement, guitar, synthesizer
- Lee Dong-hyeok – bass
- Jeong Eun-kyeong – recording, digital editing
- Woo Min-jeong – recording
- Kim Dae-young – mixing

== Charts ==
Weekly chart performance for "Clap"
Chart (2017)	Peak position
Japan (Japan Hot 100) (Billboard)	50
South Korea (Gaon)	11
US World Digital Song Sales (Billboard)	4

== Certifications ==
Certifications and sales for "Clap"
Region	Certification	Certified units/sales
Streaming
Japan (RIAJ)	Gold	50,000,000^{†}
^{†} Streaming-only figures based on certification alone.
