= Teen, Age =

2017 studio album by Seventeen

Studio album by Seventeen
- Released: November 6, 2017
- Genre: K-pop; dance-pop; hip hop; R&B
- Length: 38:50
- Language: Korean; English
- Label: Pledis; LOEN

Seventeen chronology
| Al1 (2017) | Teen, Age (2017) | We Make You (2018) |

Singles from Teen, Age
- 1. "Clap" Released: November 6, 2017

Special album

Singles from Director's Cut
- 1. "Thanks" Released: February 5, 2018

Teen, Age (stylized in all caps) is the second studio album by South Korean boy group Seventeen. It was released on November 6, 2017 by Pledis Entertainment with the lead single "Clap". Teen, Age was the group's second number one on the Billboard World Album Charts.

The album was later repackaged as Seventeen's first special album entitled Director's Cut on February 5, 2018, with the title track "Thanks".

== Background ==
In May 2017, Seventeen released the EP Al1 as the first chapter of their "2017 Seventeen Project". Following the release of Al1, Seventeen started the second chapter of the project by releasing "Change Up", a song by the group's respective hip-hop, performance, and vocal team leaders: S.Coups, Hoshi, and Woozi. Three additional songs, "Trauma", "Lilili Yabbay", and "Pinwheel", were released by each of the respective teams as incremental chapters. Teen, Age was then confirmed to be the third and final chapter of the project, comprising the four pre-released songs among others.

== Promotion ==
“With our youngest member Dino turning 20 next year, us Seventeen members would like to send a round of applause to our passionate journey through adolescence during the past years."

— Hoshi on the album's title, Korea Herald

On October 21, Seventeen released the timeline for the album teasers. The full tracklist was revealed on October 28, with the lead single "Clap", all four previously released songs, and new songs exploring different combinations of the group's members. On October 31, the group revealed they would perform "Clap" for the first time in a TV special with Mnet.

On January 25, 2018, Seventeen announced a repackage of the album titled Director's Cut, which was released on February 5. The track list was revealed on January 29, including five new songs, with the lead single "Thanks".

== Commercial performance ==
Teen, Age surpassed Seventeen's previous album sales records, recording a total of 215,669 albums sold in the first week. The album also reached number one on South Korea's weekly Gaon Chart and was the group's second number one on the Billboard World Album Charts.

Director's Cut similarly proved to be a commercial success, ranking first on South Korea's Hanteo Chart and again on the weekly Gaon Chart.

== Track listing ==
Credits adapted from KOMCA

Standard edition
| No. | Title | Lyrics | Music | Arrangement | Length |
|---|---|---|---|---|---|
| 1. | "Intro. 新世界" (New World) | Bumzu; Woozi | Bumzu; Woozi | Bumzu | 0:51 |
| 2. | "Change Up" (SVT Leaders) | Bumzu; S.Coups; Woozi; Hoshi | Bumzu; Woozi; Hoshi | Bumzu | 3:07 |
| 3. | "Without You" (모자를 눌러 쓰고; Mojareul nulleo sseugo) | Bumzu; S.Coups; Woozi; Dino; Hoshi; Vernon; Mingyu; DK; The8; Jeonghan | Bumzu; Woozi; Park Ki-tae | Bumzu; Park Ki-tae | 3:15 |
| 4. | "Clap" (박수; Baksu) | Bumzu; Woozi; Hoshi; Mingyu; DK; Seungkwan; Jeonghan | Bumzu; Woozi; Park Ki-tae | Bumzu; Park Ki-tae | 2:47 |
| 5. | "Bring It" (날 쏘고 가라; Nal ssogo gara) (Hoshi & Woozi) | Woozi; Hoshi; Vernon | Woozi; Won Yeong-heon; Dong Ne-hyeong; Min Sik-i | Won Yeong-heon; Dong Ne-hyeong; Min Sik-i | 3:32 |
| 6. | "Lilili Yabbay" (13월의 춤; 13 worui chum; lit. 'Dance of the 13 Months') (Performance Team) | Bumzu; Woozi; Dino | Bumzu; Woozi; Dirty Orange; Mitsu.J | | 3:31 |
| 7. | "Trauma" (Hip-Hop Team) | S.Coups; Wonwoo; Vernon; Mingyu | Bumzu; Vernon | Bumzu | 3:33 |
| 8. | "Pinwheel" (바람개비; Baramgaebi) (Vocal Team) | Woozi | Woozi; Won Yeong-heon; Dong Ne-hyeong | Won Yeong-heon; Dong Ne-hyeong | 3:39 |
| 9. | "Flower" (S.Coups, Seungkwan, Wonwoo, The8, Jeonghan, & Dino) | Bumzu; S.Coups; Woozi; Wonwoo; Dino; Seungkwan; The8; Jeonghan | Bumzu | Bumzu | 3:27 |
| 10. | "Rocket" (Joshua & Vernon) | Woozi; Vernon; Nathan; Joshua | Bumzu; Woozi; Vernon; Nathan | Bumzu; Nathan | 3:08 |
| 11. | "Hello" (Jun, Mingyu, & DK) | Bumzu; Mingyu; DK; Jun | Bumzu; DK | Bumzu; Anchor | 3:20 |
| 12. | "Campfire" (캠프파이어; Kaempeupaieo) | Bumzu; S.Coups; Woozi; Wonwoo; Jeonghan; Vernon; Mingyu; DK; Seungkwan; The8 | Bumzu; Woozi; Won Yeong-heon; Dong Ne-hyeong | Yama Art; Won Yeong-heon; Dong Ne-hyeong | 3:27 |
| 13. | "Outro. 未完" (Incompletion) | | Bumzu; Woozi; Park Ki-tae | Bumzu; Park Ki-tae | 1:13 |
| Total length: | | | | | 38:50 |

Special edition
| No. | Title | Lyrics | Music | Arrangements | Length |
|---|---|---|---|---|---|
| 1. | "Thinkin' About You" | Bumzu; S.Coups; Woozi; Wonwoo; Vernon | Bumzu; Woozi; Park Ki-tae | Park Ki-tae; Woozi | 3:42 |
| 2. | "Thanks" (고맙다; Gomapda) | Bumzu; Woozi; Hoshi | Bumzu; Woozi | Bumzu; Park Ki-tae | 3:33 |
| 3. | "Run To You" (지금 널 찾아가고 있어; Jigeum neol chajagago isseo) | Bumzu; Woozi | Bumzu; Woozi; Park Ki-tae | Bumzu; Park Ki-tae | 3:14 |
| 4. | "Falling for U" (Joshua & Jeonghan) | Bumzu; Woozi; Jeonghan; Joshua | Bumzu; Woozi; Jeonghan; Joshua | Bumzu | 3:55 |
| Total length: | | | | | 14:13 |

== Personnel ==
Credits adapted from Dork.

Track numbers 1-13 refer to the standard edition of Teen, Age. Special edition track numbers refer to the Director's Cut added tracks.

Musicians

- SEVENTEEN - primary vocals
  - S.Coups - vocals (2-4, 7, 9, 12, special 1-3)
  - Jeonghan - vocals (3, 4, 8, 9, 12, special 1-4)
  - Joshua - vocals (3, 4, 8, 10, 12, special 1-4)
  - Jun - vocals (3, 4, 6, 11, 12, special 1-3)
  - Hoshi - vocals (2-6, 12, special 1, special 3)
  - Wonwoo - vocals (3, 4, 7, 9, 12, special 1-3)
  - Woozi - vocals (2-5, 8, 12, special 1-3), additional vocals (10), chorus vocals (3, 6, 8, 10, 12, special 1), producer (4, 5, 13, special 2)
  - DK - vocals (3, 4, 8, 11, 12, special 1-3)
  - Mingyu - vocals (3, 4, 7, 11, 12, special 1-3), chorus vocals (7)
  - The8 - vocals (3, 4, 6, 9, 12, special 1-3)
  - Seungkwan - vocals (3, 4, 8, 9, 12, special 1-3), chorus vocals (9)
  - Vernon - vocals (3, 4, 7, 10, 12, special 1-3)
  - Dino - vocals (3, 4, 6, 9, 12, special 1-3)
- Park Ki Tae - guitar (10, 11, special 1-3), piano (3), synthesizer (3, special 3), producer (4, 13, special 2)
- Dong Ne Hyeong - producer (5), bass, drums, keyboards (8, 12)
- Won Young Heon - producer (5), bass, drums, keyboards (8, 12)
- Mitsu.J - guitar (6)
- Dirty Orange - synthesizer (6)
- Bae Art - bass, drums, keyboards, guitar, piano (8, 12)
- Lee Dong Hyeok - bass (10, 11, special 1, special 2)
- NATHAN - piano, synthesizer (10)

Technical

- Bumzu - producer (4, 13, special 2), recording (1, 3, 6, 7, 9-11, special 2), additional vocals (10), chorus vocals (1-3, 6, 7, 9-11, special 1-3), piano (2, 6, 7, 9), synthesizer (6, 9, special 3)
- Kim Tae Yeong - digital audio editing (1), mixing (1, 13), recording (8)
- Jung Eun Kyung - digital audio editing (2, 3, 6-12, special 1, special 3), recording (2, 3, 6-12, special 1-3)
- Anchor (PRISMFILTER) - mixing (2, 3, 7, 10, 11, special 3)
- Woo Min Jeong - recording (2, 3, 6-11, special 2, special 3)
- Kim Dae Young - recording (3, special 2), mixing (9, special 1)
- Cha Ye Ji - assistant recording (3, 8)
- Marco Bender - mixing (6)
- MasterKey - mixing (8, 12)
- Lee Yoo Jung - digital audio editing (special 2)
- Ko Hyun Jeong - mixing (special 2)

== Charts ==
=== Weekly charts ===
Weekly chart performance for Teen, Age and Director's Cut
| Chart (2017–2018) | Peak position | |
| Chart (2017–2018) | TA | DC |
|---|---|---|
| Japanese Albums (Billboard Japan) | 25 | 19 |
| Japanese Albums (Oricon) | 5 | 2 |
| South Korean Albums (Gaon) | 1 | 1 |
| US Heatseekers Albums (Billboard) | 8 | 2 |
| US Independent Albums (Billboard) | 41 | 19 |
| US World Albums (Billboard) | 1 | 2 |

=== Year-end charts ===
2017-2018 year-end chart performance for Teen, Age and Director's Cut
| Chart (2017–2018) | Peak position | |
| Chart (2017–2018) | TA | DC |
|---|---|---|
| Japanese Albums (Oricon) | 82 | — |
| South Korean Albums (Gaon) | 9 | 26 |

2023 year-end chart performance for Teen, Age
| Chart (2023) | Position |
|---|---|
| South Korean Albums (Circle) | 67 |

== Certifications and sales ==
Sales certifications for Teen, Age
| Region | Certification | Certified units/sales |
|---|---|---|
| Japan | — | 65,377 |
| South Korea | — | 395,148 |

Sales certifications for Director's Cut
| Region | Certification | Certified units/sales |
|---|---|---|
| South Korea (KMCA) | Platinum | 250,000^{^} |
^{^} Shipments figures based on certification alone.

== Release history ==
| Region | Date | Format | Label | Ref. |
|---|---|---|---|---|
| South Korea | November 6, 2017 | CD; digital download | Pledis Entertainment; LOEN Entertainment | |
| Worldwide | November 6, 2017 | Digital download | Pledis Entertainment; LOEN Entertainment | |
