= Hype Vibes =

- Digital cover

EP by S.Coups X Mingyu
- Released: September 29, 2025
- Length: 16:47
- Languages: Korean; English
- Labels: Pledis; YG Plus

Singles from Hype Vibes
- 1. "5, 4, 3 (Pretty Woman)" Released: September 29, 2025

Hype Vibes is the debut extended play (EP) by S.Coups X Mingyu, (Note: Also referred to as CxM) a sub-unit of the South Korean boy band Seventeen. It was released on September 29, 2025, alongside its lead single "5, 4, 3 (Pretty Woman)" featuring American rapper Lay Bankz.

== Background and release ==
After attending a Los Angeles Dodgers game together in August, Pledis confirmed that Hip-hop team members S.Coups and Mingyu would be officially debuting as Seventeen's fourth sub-unit later in the year. Hype Vibes, was announced on September 3, with the release of a trailer filmed in Los Angeles. The track list was revealed on September 13, with the duo participating in the production of all six songs and announcing a collaboration with Lay Bankz for the lead single. A highlight medley of the EP was released on September 22, with two teasers for the music video released later that week. The EP and its lead single were both released on September 29.

== Promotion ==
On September 21, one week ahead of the EP's release, S.Coups and Mingyu held a listening party in Hannam-dong, Seoul, for Meta's first collaboration with a K-pop artist. All six songs from the EP were previewed at the event for the first time. A pop-up store was opened in Seoul from September 30 to commemorate the EP. The pop-up includes albums and merchandise for sale, alongside displays of memorabilia from the album and music video production. The pair also collaborated with Photoism for a limited edition photobooth frame available across 18 countries.

S.Coups and Mingyu performed "5, 4, 3 (Pretty Woman)" and "Worth It" for the first time on M Countdown on October 2, and again on Show! Music Core on October 4. On October 5, they held a showcase for fans titled "Vibe Alive: Chill Moments" with a guest appearance from Seungkwan.

== Critical reception ==
In a review by Rhian Daly for NME, Hype Vibes was scored three out of five stars; the EP was commended for its "bright energy" and cohesion but was otherwise criticized for its "uneven" character and unpredictability.

== Commercial performance ==
On the day of its release, Hype Vibes was recorded by Hanteo to have sold over 600,000 copies, a new record for the most first-day sales of a K-pop sub-unit. The EP then topped the Oricon daily albums chart, a day after its release. Hype Vibes debuted at number 71 on the Billboard 200 with 13,000 album-equivalent units and at number 2 on the World Albums chart, following its physical release on 10 October. It also entered the Top Album Sales chart at number 5.

== Track listing ==
Hype Vibes track listing
No.	Title	Lyrics	Music	Length
1.	"Fiesta"	Bumzu; Mingyu; S.Coups; Jake K; Andreas Oberg; Christoffer Jonsson	Bumzu; Mingyu; S.Coups; Jake K; Oberg; Jonsson; Ninos Hanna; Wiljam; Benji Bae; Ryan Curtis; Kalvin Boal	2:45
2.	"5, 4, 3 (Pretty Woman)" (featuring Lay Bankz)	Bumzu; Mingyu; S.Coups; Shannon Bae; Lay Bankz; Roy Orbison; William Dees	Bumzu; Mingyu; S.Coups; Orbison; Dees; Ohway!	2:46
3.	"Worth It"	Bumzu; Mingyu; S.Coups	Bumzu; Mingyu; S.Coups; Jintae Ko; James Lavigne; Tiina Vainikainen; Bae; Hey Farmer; Zingo	2:40
4.	"For You"	Bumzu; Mingyu; S.Coups; Melanie Fontana; Jack Samson; GG Ramirez; Lindgren	Bumzu; Mingyu; S.Coups; Fontana; Samson; Ramirez; Lindgren (Note: Also credited as producer); Hautboi Rich	2:54
5.	"Young Again"	Bumzu; Mingyu; S.Coups; Fontana; Samson; Ramirez; Lindgren	Bumzu; Mingyu; S.Coups; Fontana; Samson; Ramirez; Lindgren; Hautboi Rich	2:06
6.	"Earth"	Bumzu; Mingyu; S.Coups	Bumzu; Mingyu; S.Coups; Stella Jones; Lukas Costas; Rence; 153/Joombas	3:42
Total length:				16:47

== Charts ==
=== Weekly charts ===
Weekly chart performance
Chart (2025)	Peak position
French Albums (SNEP)	111
Japanese Albums (Oricon)	1
Japanese Combined Albums (Oricon)	1
Japanese Hot Albums (Billboard Japan)	3
South Korean Albums (Circle)	1
US Billboard 200	71
US World Albums (Billboard)	2

=== Monthly charts ===
Monthly chart performance
Chart (2025)	Position
Japanese Albums (Oricon)	5
South Korean Albums (Circle)	4

=== Year-end charts ===
Year-end chart performance
Chart (2025)	Position
Japanese Albums (Oricon)	51
Japanese Top Albums Sales (Billboard Japan)	52
South Korean Albums (Circle)	24

== Certifications ==
Certifications
Region	Certification	Certified units/sales
Japan (RIAJ) Physical	Gold	100,000^{^}
^{^} Shipments figures based on certification alone.

== Release history ==
Release history
Region	Date	Format	Label	Ref.
Various	September 29, 2025	Digital download; streaming	Pledis; YG Plus	
South Korea	September 29, 2025	CD; Weverse album; Kit	Pledis; YG Plus	
Japan	October 3, 2025	CD; Weverse album; Kit	Pledis Japan; Hybe Japan	
United States	October 10, 2025	CD	Pledis; YG Plus	
