= 17 Carat =

EP by Seventeen

EP by Seventeen
- Released: May 29, 2015
- Genres: K-pop; dance-pop; hip hop
- Length: 16:48
- Languages: Korean; English
- Labels: Pledis Entertainment; LOEN Entertainment

Seventeen chronology
17 Carat (2015)	Boys Be (2015)

Singles from 17 Carat
- 1. "Adore U" Released: May 29, 2015

17 Carat is the debut extended play (EP) by South Korean boy group Seventeen. It was released on May 29, 2015, by Pledis Entertainment and distributed by LOEN Entertainment. "Adore U" serves as the lead single for the EP.

== Background and release ==
17 Carat features five tracks written, co-written, and co-produced by Seventeen's group members. "Adore U" was chosen as the lead single for the EP and was performed on multiple music shows by the group. "Shining Diamond" was used as a pre-single on the group's reality debut show. The group stated that the tracklist was chosen to reflect Seventeen's core concept of "boys' passion". The album has two physical versions: one with a "black" themed photo card set, and the other with a "white" themed photo card set. All copies include a CD containing the songs and a fold-up poster/lyric sheet.

== Single ==
"Adore U" is the lead single of the extended play. It was written by Woozi, S.Coups, and Yeon Dong-geon. The Korea Herald states "'Adore U' is a funky pop song about a teenage boy trying to navigate through puppy love." It marks the beginning of the group's trilogy composed of the singles Adore U, Mansae, and Pretty U about a boy meeting, falling in love and asking out a girl. The track was composed and arranged by Woozi, Bumzu, and Yeon Dong-geon. The music video for the single was released on May 29, 2015, and was directed by Dee Shin. The dance choreography accompaniment to the song was choreographed by Hoshi and focuses on "storytelling, and on highlighting each member's strengths onstage". The single has sold more than 38,000 digital copies and peaked at number 13 on the Billboard US World Chart.

== Commercial performance ==
The EP has sold over 82,972 copies in South Korea. It peaked at number 4 on the Korean Gaon Album Chart and number 8 on the US World Billboard Chart.The EP remained on Billboard's World Albums chart for 11 weeks.

== Accolades ==
Year-end lists
Critic/publication	List	Rank	Ref.
Billboard	The 10 Best K-pop Album of 2015	Placed	

== Track listing ==
Hoshi participated in the choreography of "Adore U" and "Shining Diamond", Dino choreographed "Jam Jam". Track credits adapted from the liner notes of 17 Carat album.

Official track list
No.	Title	Lyrics	Music	Arrangement	Length
1.	"Shining Diamond"	Woozi; S.Coups; Vernon; Kim Min-jung	Woozi; MasterKey; Rishi	MasterKey; Rishi	3:24
2.	"Adore U" (아낀다; Akkinda)	Woozi; S.Coups; Vernon; Bumzu	Woozi; Bumzu; Yeom Dong-gun	Woozi; Bumzu; Yeom Dong-gun	3:07
3.	"Ah Yeah" (by Hip-Hop Team)	S.Coups; Mingyu; Wonwoo; Vernon; Woozi	Rishi	Rishi	3:29
4.	"Jam Jam" (by Performance Team + Vernon)	Woozi; Hoshi; Dino; Vernon	Woozi; Cream Donuts	Cream Donuts	3:25
5.	"20" (by Vocal Team)	Woozi	Woozi; Won Young-heon; Dong Ne-hyeong	Won Young-heon; Dong Ne-hyeong	3:23
Total length:					16:48

== Personnel ==
Credits adapted from Dork and the liner notes of 17 Carat.

SEVENTEEN

- S.Coups – vocals (1-3)
- Jeonghan – vocals (1, 2, 5)
- Joshua – vocals (1, 2, 5)
- Jun – vocals (1, 2, 4)
- Hoshi – vocals (1, 2, 4), choreography
- Wonwoo – vocals (1-3)
- Woozi – vocals (1, 2, 5), chorus vocals (1, 4, 5), music producer
- DK – vocals (1, 2, 5)
- Mingyu – vocals (1-3)
- The8 – vocals (1, 2, 4)
- Seungkwan – vocals (1, 2, 5)
- Vernon – vocals (1-4)
- Dino – vocals (1, 2, 4)

Additional musicians

- LISHBEATS (Rishi) – synthesizer, drums (1); bass, keyboards, drums (3)
- Lee Tae-wook – guitar (1)
- In Young-hoon – electric piano (2)
- Park Ki-tae – guitar (2)
- Lee Dong-hyeok – bass (2)
- Geumbungeo – drum programming (4)
- Dong Ne-hyeong – keyboards, piano, bass, drums (5)
- Won Young-heon – keyboards, piano, bass, drums (5)
- Jung Soo-wan (Sean Soowan Chung) of Serengeti – guitar (5)

Production and engineering

- Han Sung-soo – producer
- Kim Young-soo – executive producer
- Bumzu – chorus vocals (1, 2, 5), recording at 4420 AZIT (2, 5), vocal direction (2)
- MasterKey – keyboards, drums (1), mixing at MasterPiece SoundLab (1, 3-5), mastering at MasterPiece SoundLab
- Rhymer – music producer
- Kim Dae-young – recording at Pledis Studio
- Shin Yong-sik of StayTuned – mixing at Velvet Studio (2)

Additional personnel

- Choi Young-jun – choreography
- No Ji-won – brand strategy and production
- Ahn Shin-gyu – brand strategy and production

== Charts ==
=== Weekly charts ===
Weekly chart performance for 17 Carat
Chart (2015–2023)	Peak position
Japanese Albums (Oricon)	46
South Korean Albums (Gaon)	4
US World Albums (Billboard)	8

=== Year-end charts ===
Year-end chart performance for 17 Carat
Chart (2015)	Peak position
South Korean Albums (Gaon)	47
