= Adore U (Seventeen song) =

2015 debut single by Seventeen

Single by Seventeen

from the EP 17 Carat
- Language: Korean
- Released: May 29, 2015
- Genre: K-pop
- Length: 3:24
- Label: Pledis
- Composers: Woozi; Bumzu; Yeom Dong-gun
- Lyricists: Woozi; S.Coups; Vernon; Bumzu

Seventeen singles chronology
"Adore U" (2015)	"Mansae" (2015)

Music video
- "Adore U" on YouTube

"Adore U" (Korean: 아낀다; RR: Akkinda; lit. 'Cherish') is the debut song by South Korean boy group Seventeen. It was released as the lead single from their debut extended play (EP) 17 Carat on May 29, 2015.

== Background and release ==
On May 26, 2015, Seventeen held a showcase at the MBC Dream Centre in Ilsan, South Korea, where they performed two songs, "Adore U" and "Shining Diamond", from their forthcoming EP 17 Carat. The showcase was the culmination of four years of training and the pre-debut reality series Seventeen Project: Debut Big Plan by MBC. The EP was officially distributed three days later, with "Adore U" serving as its lead single.

In 2016, Seventeen released a re-worked version of "Adore U" for their first studio album Love & Letter, sung by the group's Vocal Team. In 2024, "Adore U" and an instrumental version of the song were included in 17 is Right Here, a compilation album of the group's releases.

== Composition ==
"Adore U" was written by Seventeen members Woozi, S.Coups, and Vernon, alongside Bumzu, one of the group's main producers. It was composed and arranged by Woozi, Bumzu, and Yeom Dong-gun. It has been described as a blend of funky pop-rock and '90s hip-hop. It was written in the key of G major with a tempo of 102 beats per minute.

== Reception ==
Jeff Benjamin reviewed the song for Billboard, commending the group for the distribution of lines and camera time among the "largest pop act, member-wise, in Korea". Listed by Dazed at seventh place in their top 20 songs of 2015, the song was described as "a playful, pure candy floss track". In a list of their top ten Seventeen summer songs, Kpop Herald described "Adore U" as one of the best K-pop debuts of all time.

=== Covers ===
In 2020, Weeekly released a Christmas-themed cover of the song. Boy group Epex covered the song in 2022 during their debut concert. In 2023, the song was performed by contestants of the South Korean competition show Peak Time.

== Credits and personnel ==
Credits adapted from the 17 Carat lyric book.

Location

- Recorded at Pledis Studio and 4420AZIT
- Mixed at Velvet Studio

Credits and personnel

- Bumzu – lyrics, composition, arrangement, chorus, vocal direction, recording
- Woozi – lyrics, composition, arrangement
- S.Coups – lyrics
- Vernon – lyrics
- Yeom Dong-gun – composition, arrangement
- In Yeon-jun – electric guitar
- Park Ki-tae – guitar
- Lee Dong-hyeok – bass
- Kim Dae-yeom – recording
- Shin Yong-sik – mixing

== Charts ==
Weekly chart performance for "Adore U"
Chart (2016)	Peak position
South Korea Download (Gaon)	191
US World Digital Song Sales (Billboard)	13

== Release history ==
Release history for "Adore U"
Region	Date	Format	Version	Label	Ref.
Various	May 29, 2015	Digital download; streaming	Original	Pledis; YG Plus	
Various	April 25, 2016	Digital download; streaming	Vocal Team version	Pledis; YG Plus	
Various	April 29, 2024	Digital download; streaming	Instrumental	Pledis; YG Plus	
