= The Table (EP) =

- Digital and streaming cover

EP by NU'EST
- Released: October 21, 2019
- Genre: K-pop
- Length: 19:38
- Label: Pledis Entertainment
- Producer: Baekho; Bumzu

NU'EST chronology
Happily Ever After (2019)	The Table (2019)	The Nocturne (2020)

Singles from The Table
- 1. "Love Me" Released: October 21, 2019

The Table is the seventh Korean extended play by the South Korean boy band NU'EST, released on October 21, 2019.

== Background and release ==
On September 30, 2019, Pledis Entertainment confirmed NU'EST's comeback was set for October 21, 2019, and uploaded a teaser ending with the text, "The book has been closed. And shall we meet at...?", officially concluding their "Three-part Knight Series" spanning from Q is to Happily Ever After. After releasing several trailers for each member, a final trailer was uploaded on October 12, 2019.

In contrast to NU'EST's previous albums, The Table featured a "lovely and bright" concept, opting for a more easygoing and familiar concept for listeners. The Table revolves around the theme of love, with each song representing stories that friends and families would share about romances while sitting at a dinner table. The album took more retakes to record than ever due to the members of NU'EST finding difficulties in adjusting concepts. The album is sold in three different versions with alternate photo books and covers: the Forenoon Ver., On The Table Ver., and Pieces of Pie Ver.

== Composition ==
The album was produced by Baekho and Bumzu. The title track, "Love Me", expresses a "sweet love" while using elements of alternative house and urban R&B. The song describes a person in love, strengthened from the sad feelings of protecting his love from the "Three-part Knight Series." It was also described with having an "addictive" chorus. To accentuate the soft image, the choreography of the song focused on romantic and delicate gestures.

The opening track, "Call Me Back", is an R&B song opening with an easygoing acoustic guitar. "One Two Three" is a new jack swing song expressing the happy emotions and heartbeat of a person falling in love. "Trust Me" is a pop R&B song expressing the feeling of running towards a loved one. The lyrics of "Stay Up All Night" express memories of a past love. "If We" is a mixture of folk rock and ballad. JR, who mainly provides rap, notably provided vocals to the song instead.

== Reception ==
In South Korea, The Table debuted at #2 on the Gaon Music Chart, selling a cumulative total of 219,477 copies.

== Track listing ==
All tracks are written by Baekho and Bumzu

No.	Title	Lyrics	Music	Arrangement	Length
1.	"Call Me Back"	Baekho; JR; Bumzu	Bumzu; Baekho; Park Gi-tae; Aaron Fresh; Jo Michael (Singing Beetle)	Park Gi-tae	3:09
2.	"Love Me"	Baekho; JR; Bumzu	Bumzu; Baekho; Park Gi-tae	Bumzu; Park Gi-tae; Nmore	3:03
3.	"One Two Three"	Baekho; Minhyun; JR; Bumzu	Bumzu; Baekho; Anchor	Bumzu; Anchor	3:23
4.	"Trust Me"	Baekho; JR; Bumzu	Bumzu; Baekho	Bumzu	3:21
5.	"Stay Up All Night" (밤새 lit. Midnight)	Baekho; JR; Bumzu	Bumzu; Baekho; Park Gi-tae	Bumzu; Park Gi-tae	3:35
6.	"If We" (우리가 사랑했다면 lit. If We Were in Love)	Baekho; Bumzu	Bumzu; Baekho	Bumzu; Park Gi-tae	3:07
Total length:					19:38

== Charts ==
Chart (2019)	Peak position
South Korean Albums (Gaon)	2

== Accolades ==
=== Music programs awards ===
Song	Program	Network	Date	Ref.
"Love Me"	Show Champion	MBC M	October 30, 2019	
"Love Me"	M Countdown	Mnet	October 31, 2019	
"Love Me"	Music Bank	KBS2	November 1, 2019	
"Love Me"	Show! Music Core	MBC	November 2, 2019	
"Love Me"	Inkigayo	SBS	November 3, 2019	
