= The Nocturne (EP) =

EP by NU'EST
- Released: May 11, 2020
- Genre: K-pop
- Length: 21:16
- Label: Pledis Entertainment; Genie Music; Stone Music Entertainment
- Producer: Baekho; Bumzu

NU'EST chronology
The Table (2019)	The Nocturne (2020)	Drive (2020)

Singles from The Nocturne
- 1. "I'm in Trouble" Released: May 11, 2020

The Nocturne is the eighth and final Korean extended play by South Korean boy group NU'EST. It was released on May 11, 2020 by Pledis Entertainment and distributed by Genie Music and Stone Music Entertainment. It consists of six songs, including the lead single "I'm in Trouble".

== Release ==
The album was released on May 11, 2020, through several music portals, including MelOn and Apple Music.

== Commercial performance ==
The album debuted atop the Gaon Album Chart on the week ending May 16, 2020. It also debuted at number 22 on the Oricon Albums Chart with 1,133 copies sold and at number 27 on the Oricon Combined Albums Chart. The album also debuted at number 37 on Billboard Japan's Hot Albums and at number 16 on Top Download Albums.

A month later, the EP re-entered two main charts in Japan achieving a new peak, the Oricon Albums Chart with additional 6,665 copies sold at number 5, and Billboard Japan's Hot Albums at number 7.

== Track listing ==
Digital download
No.	Title	Lyrics	Music	Arrangement	Length
1.	"Moon Dance"	Minhyun; JR; Bumzu	Josh Cumbee; JC Chasez; Nikki Flores; Ryan S. Jhun; GESTURE	Josh Cumbee; Ryan S. Jhun	3:39
2.	"I'm in Trouble"	Baekho; Bumzu	Bumzu; Baekho	Bumzu; Baekho; Anchor	3:04
3.	"Firework"	Baekho; JR; Bumzu; doubletenboy	Bumzu; Baekho; Nmore	BUMZU; Nmore	3:27
4.	"Back to Me" (평행우주; pyeonghaeng-uju; lit: Parallel Universe)	Seo Ji-eum; Baekho; Bumzu	Bumzu; Baekho; Anchor	Anchor	3:28
5.	"Must" (꼭; kkog; lit: Exactly)	Ren; Baekho; Bumzu	Ren; Baekho; Bumzu	Bumzu; Nmore	4:06
6.	"Shooting Star" (반딧별; bandisbyeol; lit: Firefly Star)	Baekho; JR; Bumzu	Bumzu; Baekho; Anchor; Bir$day	Bumzu; Anchor; Bir$day	3:32
Total length:					21:22

== Charts ==
Chart (2020)	Peak position
Japanese Albums (Oricon)	5
Japan Combined Albums Chart (Oricon)	27
Japan Hot Albums (Billboard Japan)	7
Japan Top Download Albums (Billboard Japan)	16
South Korean Albums (Gaon)	1

== Accolades ==
=== Music programs awards ===
Song	Program	Date
"I’m in Trouble"	Show Champion (MBC Music)	May 20, 2020
"I’m in Trouble"	M Countdown (Mnet)	May 21, 2020
"I’m in Trouble"	Music Bank (KBS2)	May 22, 2020
"I’m in Trouble"	Show! Music Core (MBC)	May 23, 2020
