= Mingyu =

South Korean singer and rapper (born 1997)

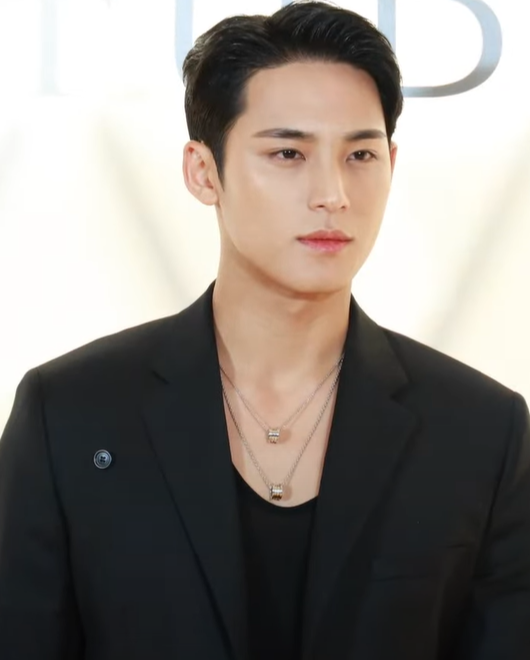
- Mingyu in March 2024
- Born: Kim Min-gyu; April 6, 1997 (age 29); Anyang, Gyeonggi, South Korea
- Occupations: Rapper; singer; songwriter
- Musical career
- Genres: K-pop; hip-hop
- Instrument: Vocals
- Years active: 2015–present
- Label: Pledis
- Member of: Seventeen; CxM

Korean name
- Hangul: 김민규
- RR: Gim Mingyu
- MR: Kim Min'gyu

Kim Min-gyu (Korean: 김민규; born April 6, 1997), known mononymously as Mingyu (민규), is a South Korean rapper and singer. Managed by Pledis Entertainment, he is a member of the South Korean boy band Seventeen and its hip hop team, and in 2025, debuted in a sub-unit with S.Coups as CxM.

== Early life ==
Mingyu was born on April 6, 1997, in Anyang, Gyeonggi, South Korea. He attended Seoul Broadcasting High School, graduating in 2016.

== Career ==
=== 2011–2014: Pre-debut ===
Mingyu joined Pledis Entertainment in October 2011 after being street-cast while attending middle school. As a trainee, he participated from the first season onwards of Seventeen TV, an online reality show that introduced Pledis' trainees and showed potential members of the boy group Seventeen before their official debut. The show was broadcast periodically on Ustream, where the trainees showed themselves training, singing, creating choreographies and playing games. The online show also included participation in concerts, titled Like Seventeen. Before officially debuting, Mingyu was featured in music videos of other Pledis artists at the time, include Nu'est and Hello Venus.

=== 2015–present: Seventeen, solo and sub-unit activities ===
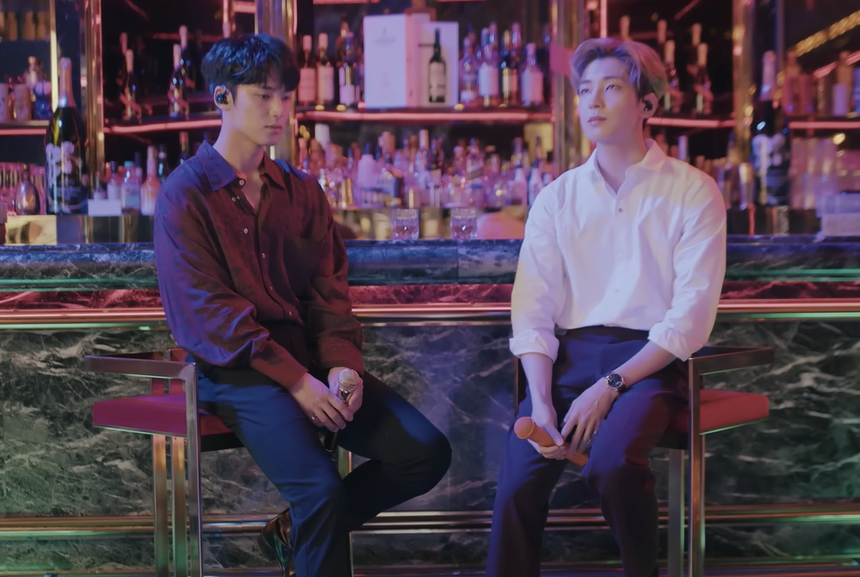
Mingyu and Wonwoo in a performance of "Bittersweet".

In 2015, Mingyu debuted as a member of the South Korean boy group Seventeen with the extended play 17 Carat on May 26. Since debuting in Seventeen, he has participated in the songwriting of over 45 songs.

In February 2018, Mingyu was announced as the new MC for SBS' weekly music program Inkigayo alongside Jung Chae-yeon of DIA and actor Song Kang. He held the role until late 2019.

In 2021, Mingyu and Seventeen bandmate Wonwoo released a digital single titled "Bittersweet", featuring Lee Hi.

In 2025, Mingyu debuted as a member of Seventeen's fourth sub-unit. He, alongside S.Coups under the name CxM, released a six-track EP titled Hype Vibes on September 29.

== Other ventures ==
=== Fashion ===
In 2022, Mingyu attended an event with French jeweler Cartier in Seoul. He was later featured on the cover of Dazed Korea's December issue wearing the brand. In February 2023, Mingyu attended Italian fashion house Marni's Fall/Winter 2023 runway show in Tokyo. In February 2024, Mingyu attended French fashion house Dior's show at Paris Fashion week, where he was profiled by Vogue.

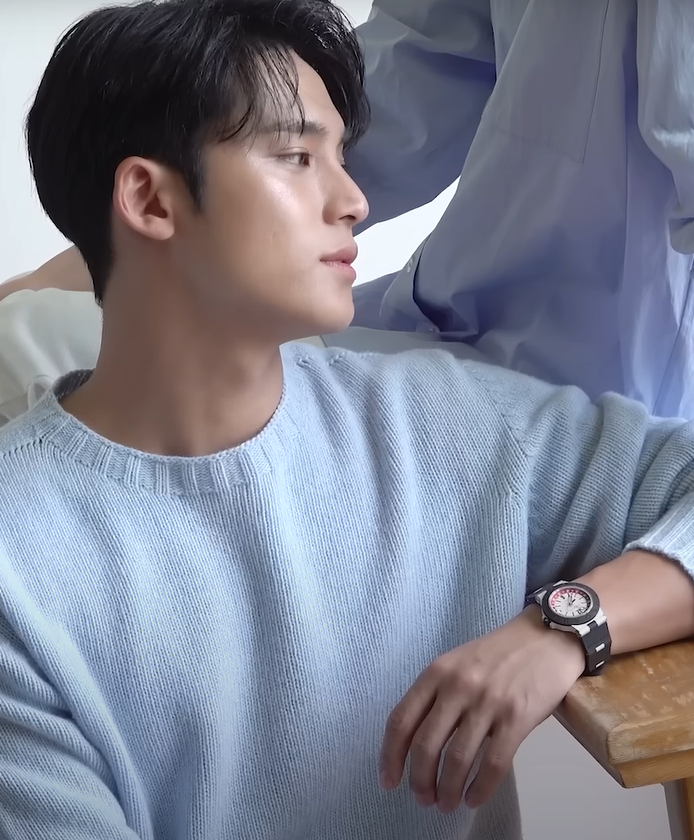
Mingyu for Bulgari in 2024.

In March 2024, Mingyu was selected as the new local ambassador for Italian luxury brand Bvlgari. In June 2024, he attended the opening of American fashion brand Calvin Klein's new global flagship store in Paris. On August 16, 2024, Mingyu became a model for Calvin Klein's Fall 2024 campaign, with photos shot by fashion photographer Park Jong Ha. In August 2024, French luxury fashion house Dior revealed Mingyu to be its latest brand ambassador.

=== Ambassadorships ===
In 2022, Mingyu was appointed as the ambassador of French cosmetic house Lancome. In 2023, he was announced as the new global model for South Korean skincare brand Innisfree. In May 2024, Mingyu was announced as the new brand ambassador for French luxury skincare brand L'Occitane in Asia. In the same month, South Korean haircare brand Unove announced Mingyu as its global brand model. In October that year, Indonesian bank Allo Bank announced Mingyu and bandmate Wonwoo as their new ambassadors. In January 2025, Mingyu was appointed as the new brand ambassador for American chocolate bar brand Snickers in Asia.

== Discography ==
=== Singles ===
| Title | Year | Peak chart positions | Album |
| Title | Year | KOR DL | Album |
|---|---|---|---|
| "Bittersweet" (with Wonwoo, featuring Lee Hi) | 2021 | 43 | Non-album single |

=== Other charted songs ===
| Title | Year | Peak chart positions | Album |
| Title | Year | KOR | Album |
|---|---|---|---|
| "Shake It Off" (Note: Credited under Seventeen but is a solo track performed by Mingyu.) | 2025 | 88 | Happy Burstday |

=== Soundtrack appearances ===
| Title | Year | Peak chart positions | Album |
| Title | Year | JPN Hot | Album |
|---|---|---|---|
| "Warrior" (逆燃) (with Joshua, Jun, The8, and Vernon) | 2021 | — | Falling Into Your Smile OST (你微笑时很美) |
| "Betting" (with Shingo Katori, Jeonghan, and Seungkwan) | 2023 | 31 | War of Traps OST |
"—" denotes releases that did not chart or were not released in that region.

=== Composition credits ===
All credits are adapted from the Korea Music Copyright Association.

| Year | Artist | Song | Album | Lyrics | | Music | |
| Year | Artist | Song | Album | Credited | With | Credited | With |
|---|---|---|---|---|---|---|---|
| 2015 | Seventeen | "Ah Yeah" | 17 Carat | Yes | S.Coups, Woozi, Wonwoo, Vernon | No | —N/a |
| 2015 | Seventeen | "Fronting" (표정관리) (S.Coups, Hoshi, Wonwoo, Woozi, Mingyu and Vernon) | Boys Be | Yes | S.Coups, Woozi, Wonwoo, Vernon | No | —N/a |
| 2015 | Seventeen | "Mansae" (만세) | Boys Be | Yes | Bumzu, S.Coups, Woozi, Wonwoo, Vernon | No | —N/a |
| 2015 | Seventeen | "Chuck" (엄지척) | Love & Letter | Yes | S.Coups, Woozi, Wonwoo, Dino, Vernon | No | —N/a |
| 2015 | Seventeen | "Hit Song" (유행가) | Love & Letter | Yes | Bumzu, S.Coups, Dino, Vernon | No | —N/a |
| 2015 | Seventeen | "Drift Away" (떠내려가) (S.Coups, Jeonghan, Joshua, Mingyu, The8 and Seungkwan) | Love & Letter | Yes | S.Coups, Woozi, Hoshi, Seungkwan | No | —N/a |
| 2015 | Seventeen | "Monday to Saturday" (만세) (Hip Hop Team Version) | Love & Letter | Yes | Bumzu, S.Coups, Woozi, Wonwoo, Vernon | No | —N/a |
| 2015 | Seventeen | "Love Letter" (사랑쪽지) | Love & Letter | Yes | S.Coups, Woozi, Wonwoo, Vernon | No | —N/a |
| 2016 | Seventeen | "Healing" (힐링) | Love & Letter - Repackage album | Yes | S.Coups, Woozi, Dino, Vernon | No | —N/a |
| 2016 | Seventeen | "Space" (끝이안보여) | Love & Letter - Repackage album | Yes | Bumzu, S.Coups, Wonwoo, Vernon | No | —N/a |
| 2016 | Seventeen | "Beautiful" (Joshua, Hoshi, DK, Mingyu, The8, Dino) | Going Seventeen | Yes | Bumzu, Woozi, Dino | Yes | Bumzu, Lee Gi-yong, Woozi |
| 2016 | Seventeen | "Boom Boom" (붐붐) | Going Seventeen | Yes | Bumzu, S.Coups, Woozi, Wonwoo, Vernon | No | —N/a |
| 2016 | Seventeen | "Lean On Me" (기대) (Hip Hop Team) | Going Seventeen | Yes | Bumzu, S.Coups, Wonwoo, Vernon | No | —N/a |
| 2017 | Seventeen | "If I" (Hip Hop Team) | Al1 | Yes | S.Coups, Vernon | No | —N/a |
| 2017 | Seventeen | "Crazy In Love" | Al1 | Yes | Bumzu, S.Coups, Woozi, Vernon | No | —N/a |
| 2017 | Seventeen | "Without You" (모자를눌러쓰고) | Teen, Age | Yes | Bumzu, S.Coups, Woozi, Dino, Hoshi, Vernon, DK, The8, Jeonghan | No | —N/a |
| 2017 | Seventeen | "Clap" (박수) | Teen, Age | Yes | Bumzu, Woozi, Hoshi, DK, Jeonghan, Seungkwan | No | —N/a |
| 2017 | Seventeen | "Trauma" (Hip Hop Team) | Teen, Age | Yes | S.Coups, Wonwoo, Vernon | No | —N/a |
| 2017 | Seventeen | "Hello" (Jun, Mingyu and DK) | Teen, Age | Yes | Bumzu, DK, Jun | No | —N/a |
| 2017 | Seventeen | "Campfire" (캠프파이어) | Teen, Age | Yes | Bumzu, S.Coups, Woozi, Wonwoo, Vernon, DK, Seungkwan, The8, Jeonghan | No | —N/a |
| 2018 | Seventeen | "Thinkin' About You" | Director's Cut | Yes | Woozi, Dino, Vernon | No | —N/a |
| 2018 | Seventeen | "MMO" (Hip Hop Team) | Non-album singles | Yes | S.Coups, Wonwoo, Vernon | No | —N/a |
| 2018 | Seventeen | "Joker" (Hip Hop Team) | Non-album singles | Yes | S.Coups, Wonwoo, Vernon | No | —N/a |
| 2018 | Seventeen | "Un Haeng Il Chi" (언행일치)(言行一致) (Hip Hop Team) | Non-album singles | Yes | Bumzu, S.Coups, Wonwoo, Vernon | No | —N/a |
| 2018 | Seventeen | "What's the Problem" (Hip Hop Team) | Non-album singles | Yes | S.Coups, Wonwoo, Vernon | No | —N/a |
| 2018 | Seventeen | "What's Good" (Hip Hop Team) | You Make My Day | Yes | S.Coups, Wonwoo, Vernon | No | —N/a |
| 2018 | Seventeen | "Our Dawn Is Hotter Than Day" (우리의새벽은낮보다뜨겁다) | You Make My Day | Yes | Bumzu, S.Coups, Woozi, Wonwoo, Vernon | No | —N/a |
| 2018 | Seventeen | "Chilli" (칠리) (Hip Hop Team) | You Make My Day | Yes | S.Coups, Wonwoo, Vernon | No | —N/a |
| 2019 | Seventeen | "9-Teen" | A-Teen 2 OST Part 2 | Yes | Bumzu, S.Coups, Woozi | No | —N/a |
| 2019 | Seventeen | "Lie Again" (거짓말을해) | An Ode | Yes | Bumzu, S.Coups, Woozi, Vernon | No | —N/a |
| 2019 | Seventeen | "Let Me Hear You Say" | An Ode | Yes | Bumzu, S.Coups, Woozi, Vernon | No | —N/a |
| 2019 | Seventeen | "Back It Up" (Hip Hop Team) | An Ode | Yes | S.Coups, Wonwoo, Vernon | No | —N/a |
| 2019 | Seventeen | "Lucky" | An Ode | Yes | Bumzu, Woozi, Vernon, Seungkwan | No | —N/a |
| 2019 | Seventeen | "Snapshoot" | An Ode | Yes | Bumzu, S.Coups, Woozi, Vernon | No | —N/a |
| 2020 | Seventeen | "Together" (같이가요) | Heng:garæ | Yes | Bumzu, S.Coups, Woozi, Hoshi | No | —N/a |
| 2020 | Seventeen | "Hey Buddy" (The8, DK and Mingyu) | Semicolon | Yes | Bumzu, Woozi, DK, The8 | Yes | Bumzu, Lee Gi-yong, Woozi, DK, The8, Lee Min-gyu |
| 2021 | Wonwoo and Mingyu | "Bittersweet" (feat. Lee Hi) | Non-album single | Yes | Bumzu, Wonwoo, Jo Yoon-kyeong | No | —N/a |
| 2021 | Seventeen | "Ready to love" | Your Choice | Yes | Bumzu, Danke, S.Coups, Woozi, hitman bang, Niko Kyler | No | —N/a |
| 2021 | Seventeen | "GAM3 BO1" (Hip Hop Team) | Your Choice | Yes | Bumzu, S.Coups, Wonwoo, Woozi, Vernon | No | —N/a |
| 2021 | Seventeen | "Heaven's Cloud" | Your Choice | Yes | Woozi, Bumzu, S.Coups | No | —N/a |
| 2021 | Seventeen | "In The Soop" | Non-album single | Yes | Woozi, Wonwoo, Dino, Hoshi, Joshua, DK, Jeonghan | No | —N/a |
| 2021 | Seventeen | "I can't run away" (그리워하는것까지) (Hip Hop Team) | Attacca | Yes | Bumzu, S.Coups, Wonwoo, Woozi, Vernon | Yes | Bumzu, Wonwoo, Woozi, Vernon, Lee Min-gyu |
| 2022 | Seventeen | "Domino" | Face the Sun | Yes | Bumzu, Woozi, Jordan Witzigreuter, Cameron Walker, Sara Davis | Yes | Bumzu, Woozi, Witzigreuter, Walker, Davis |
| 2023 | Seventeen | "Fire" (Hip Hop Team) | FML | Yes | Bumzu, S.Coups, Wonwoo, Woozi, Vernon | No | —N/a |
| 2023 | Seventeen | "God of Music" (음악의신) | Seventeenth Heaven | Yes | Bumzu, S.Coups, Woozi, Vernon | No | —N/a |
| 2023 | Seventeen | "Monster" (Hip Hop Team) | Seventeenth Heaven | Yes | Bumzu, S.Coups, Wonwoo, Woozi, Vernon | No | —N/a |
| 2023 | Seventeen | "God of Light Music" (경음악의신) | Non-album single | Yes | Bumzu, S.Coups, Woozi, Vernon, Jun | No | —N/a |
| 2024 | Seventeen | "Lalali" (Hip Hop Team) | 17 Is Right Here | Yes | Bumzu, S.Coups, Wonwoo, Woozi, Vernon | No | —N/a |
| 2024 | Seventeen | "Water" (Hip Hop Team) | Spill the Feels | Yes | Vernon, S.Coups, Wonwoo, Bumzu | Yes | Bumzu, Vernon |
| 2025 | Seventeen | "Encircled" (동그라미) | Non-album single | Yes | S.Coups, Woozi, Wonwoo, Dino, Hoshi, Vernon, Seungkwan, Jun, The8, Joshua | No | —N/a |
| 2025 | Seventeen | "Shake It Off" (Mingyu solo) | Happy Burstday | Yes | Samuel Arredondo, Shannon Bae | Yes | IOAH |

== Filmography ==
=== Television series ===
| Year | Title | Role | Notes | Ref. |
|---|---|---|---|---|
| 2017 | Luang Ta Mahachon | Mamuang | Episode: "Our Mamuang from Korea" and "Everybody's Mamuang" | |

=== Television shows ===
| Year | Title | Role | Notes | Ref. |
|---|---|---|---|---|
| 2016 | 2016 Dream Concert | Host | with Jeonghan and Jun | |
| 2016 | M Countdown | Host | with Jeonghan | |
| 2017 | KBS Song Festival | Host | with Jin, Sana, Chanyeol, Irene, Solar, Yerin, and Kang Daniel | |
| 2018–2019 | Inkigayo | Host | with Jung Chae-yeon and Song Kang | |
