= S.Coups X Mingyu =

South Korean musical duo

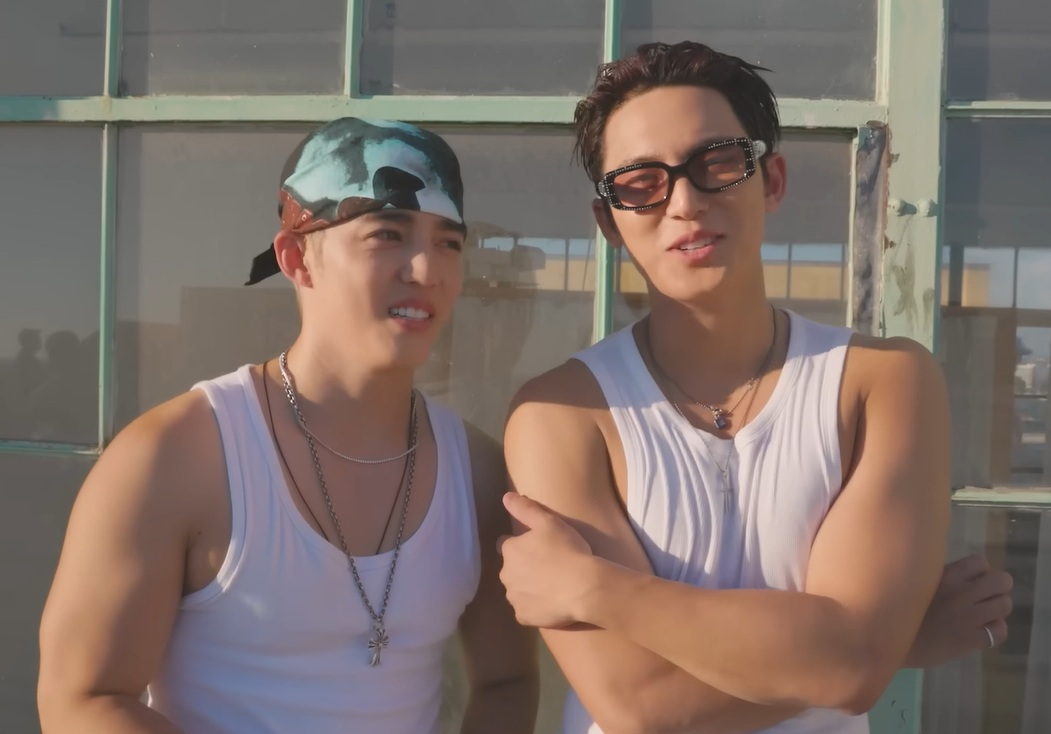
- S.Coups and Mingyu in 2025

Background information
- Also known as: CxM
- Origin: Seoul, South Korea
- Genre: K-pop
- Years active: 2025–present
- Label: Pledis
- Spinoff of: Seventeen
- Members: S.Coups; Mingyu

S.Coups X Mingyu (Korean: 에스쿱스 X 민규; also known as CxM) is a sub-unit of South Korean boy band Seventeen, consisting of hip hop team members S.Coups and Mingyu. The sub-unit is the fourth to come from the boy band, after BSS, JxW and Hoshi X Woozi. Formed by Pledis Entertainment in 2025, the duo debuted on September 29 with the extended play (EP) Hype Vibes.

== History ==
In April 2025, Seventeen announced their fifth studio album, Happy Burstday, and during the announcement also revealed that a new sub-unit would be debuting. On July 11, MyDaily reported that the new unit would be S.Coups and Mingyu, though there was no official confirmation from Pledis.

After attending a Los Angeles Dodgers game together in August, Pledis confirmed that the pair would be officially debuting later that year. The duo's debut EP, Hype Vibes, was announced on September 3, with the release of a trailer filmed in Los Angeles. Hype Vibes was released on September 29. On the same day, it was recorded by Hanteo to have sold over 600,000 copies in South Korea, a new record for the most first-day sales of a K-pop sub-unit.

On November 22, they performed at the Dream Concert festival in Abu Dhabi. On November 28, Pledis announced the pair's Double Up Live Party tour, visiting five cities across Asia in early 2026 between Seventeen's dates on the New_ World Tour.

== Discography ==
=== Extended plays ===
List of extended plays, showing selected details, selected chart positions and sales figures
| Title | Details | Peak chart positions | | | | Sales | Certifications |
| Title | Details | KOR | JPN | US | US World | Sales | Certifications |
|---|---|---|---|---|---|---|---|
| Hype Vibes | Released: September 29, 2025; Label: Pledis; Formats: CD, digital download, streaming | 1 | 1 | 71 | 2 | KOR: 986,988; JPN: 106,851 | KMCA: 3× Platinum; RIAJ: Gold (phy.) |

=== Singles ===
List of singles, showing year released, selected chart positions, and name of the album
| Title | Year | Peak chart position | Album |
| Title | Year | KOR | Album |
|---|---|---|---|
| "5, 4, 3 (Pretty Woman)" (featuring Lay Bankz) | 2025 | 55 | Hype Vibes |

=== Other charted songs ===
List of other charted songs, showing year released, selected chart positions, and name of the album
| Title | Year | Peak chart position | Album |
| Title | Year | KOR Down. | Album |
|---|---|---|---|
| "Fiesta" | 2025 | 3 | Hype Vibes |
| "Worth It" | 2025 | 5 | Hype Vibes |
| "For You" | 2025 | 4 | Hype Vibes |
| "Young Again" | 2025 | 6 | Hype Vibes |
| "Earth" | 2025 | 7 | Hype Vibes |

== Live performances ==
=== Double Up Live Party Tour ===
List of concerts, showing event names, dates, cities, countries, venues and attendance
| Date (2026) | City | Country | Venue | Ref. |
|---|---|---|---|---|
| January 23 | Incheon | South Korea | Inspire Arena | |
| January 24 | Incheon | South Korea | Inspire Arena | |
| January 25 | Incheon | South Korea | Inspire Arena | |
| January 31 | Nagoya | Japan | IG Arena | |
| February 1 | Nagoya | Japan | IG Arena | |
| February 5 | Chiba | Japan | Makuhari Messe | |
| February 6 | Chiba | Japan | Makuhari Messe | |
| February 13 | Busan | South Korea | Busan Exhibition and Convention Center | |
| February 14 | Busan | South Korea | Busan Exhibition and Convention Center | |
| April 25 | Kaohsiung | Taiwan | Kaohsiung Arena | |
| April 26 | Kaohsiung | Taiwan | Kaohsiung Arena | |
