= S.Coups =

South Korean rapper (born 1995)

- 에스쿱스
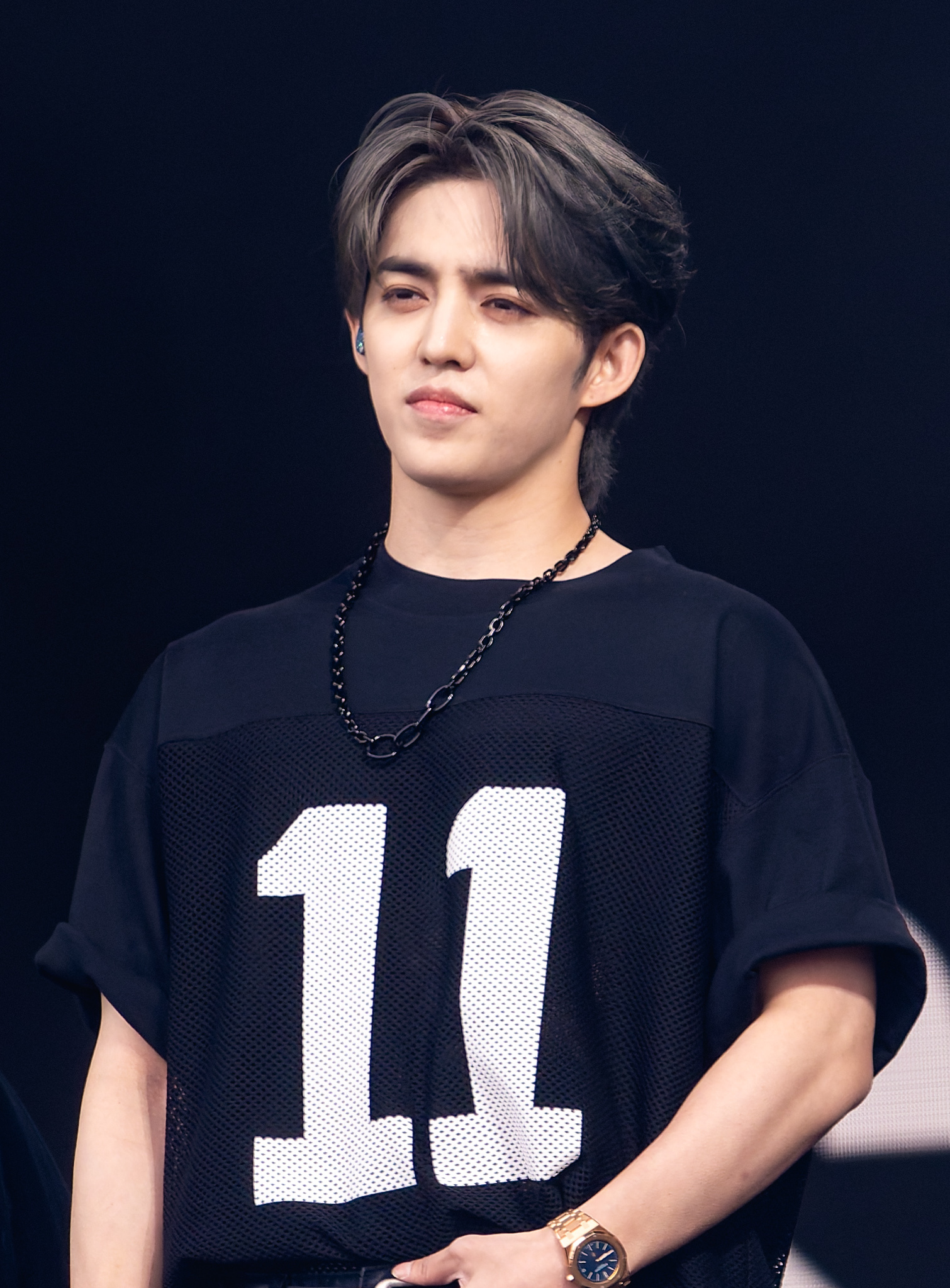
- S.Coups in June 2024
- Born: Choi Seung-cheol; 8 August 1995 (age 31); Daegu, South Korea
- Education: Hanyang University; Anyang University
- Occupations: Rapper; singer; songwriter
- Musical career
- Genres: K-pop; hip-hop
- Instrument: Vocals
- Years active: 2012; 2015–present
- Label: Pledis
- Member of: Seventeen; CxM

Korean name
- Hangul: 최승철
- RR: Choe Seungcheol
- MR: Ch'oe Sŭngch'ŏl

Choi Seung-cheol (Korean: 최승철; born 8 August 1995), known by his stage name S.Coups (에스쿱스), is a South Korean rapper, singer, and songwriter. Managed by Pledis Entertainment, he is the leader of the South Korean boy band Seventeen and its hip hop team, and in 2025 debuted in a sub-unit with Mingyu as CxM.

== Early life and education ==
Choi Seung-cheol was born in Daegu, South Korea, on 8 August 1995. Since childhood he has maintained an interest in sports and physical activity. When asked about his childhood ambitions, he has said that he had wanted to become a physical education teacher because he enjoyed sports and wanted to teach students. In middle school he was scouted to join Pledis Entertainment. He attended School of Performing Arts Seoul and then enrolled in Hanyang University. In 2022, he enrolled in a Master's degree at Anyang University.

== Career ==
=== 2009–2014: Pre-debut ===
While in middle school, S.Coups was approached by a representative of Pledis Entertainment after leaving a soccer practice session early; the scout invited him to audition, though he did not go as he thought it was a scam. He later attended an audition and joined the company as a trainee in 2009. In 2013, he joined for the second season of Seventeen TV, an online reality show that introduced Pledis' trainees and showed potential members of the boy group Seventeen before their official debut. The show was broadcast periodically on Ustream, where the trainees showed themselves training, singing, creating choreographies and playing games. The online show also included participation in concerts, titled Like Seventeen.

As a trainee, he participated in works of other Pledis artists, including featuring on Orange Caramel's debut album and appearing in NU'EST, Hello Venus, and After School music videos.

=== 2015–present: Seventeen and solo activities ===
In 2015, S.Coups debuted as a member and the leader of Seventeen with the extended play (EP) 17 Carat on 26 May. Since debuting, S.Coups has participated in the songwriting of over 70 Seventeen songs.

In 2019, it was announced that S.Coups would be taking a break due to symptoms of anxiety, missing parts of Seventeen's Ode to You World Tour. On March 3, 2020, S.Coups stated that his health had improved and announced that he planned to resume activities; he did so on May 3, in a performance of "Fallin' Flower" for Fuji Television's Love Music.

In 2021, it was announced that S.Coups would miss part of Seventeen's promotional activities for their eighth mini album, Your Choice, after sustaining a shoulder injury and facial abrasions during a scheduled event on 30 June.

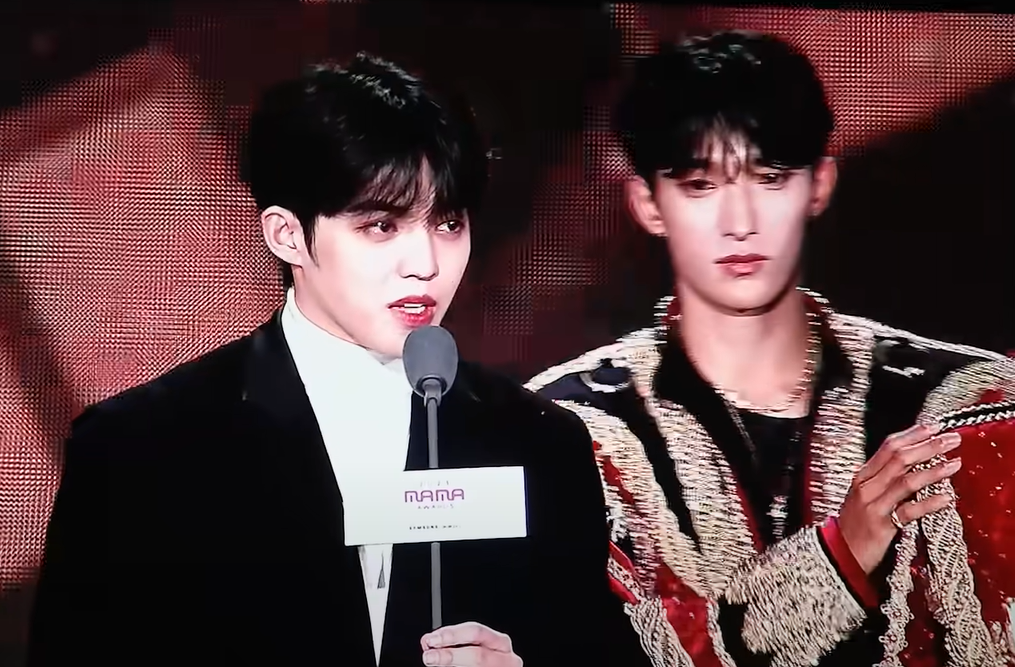
S.Coups returning from his hiatus to accept the Award for Album of the Year at the 2023 MAMA Awards.

In 2023, it was announced that S.Coups would be halting activities in order to recover from anterior cruciate ligament surgery. During his hiatus, he missed parts of Seventeen's Follow Tour, however he still made appearances at the 2023 MAMA Awards and the 38th Golden Disc Awards as Seventeen won Daesangs (Grand Prizes) at each show for FML (2023). His injury resulted in him being classified as Grade 5 under the South Korean military fitness classification, resulting in him being exempt from military service during peacetime. On 31 December, S.Coups released a digital song named "Me", written and produced by himself and regular Seventeen collaborator Bumzu.

In February 2024, Pledis announced that he, alongside bandmate Jeonghan, who was also on a health-related hiatus, would be returning to activities in March 2024. In January 2025, S.Coups was granted full membership to the Korea Music Copyright Association, which is granted to a number of musicians annually who have garnered a high amount of royalties through their music.

In 2025, S.Coups debuted as a member of Seventeen's fourth sub-unit. He, alongside Mingyu under the name S.Coups X Mingyu, released a six-track EP titled Hype Vibes on 29 September.

== Other ventures ==
=== Fashion and endorsements ===
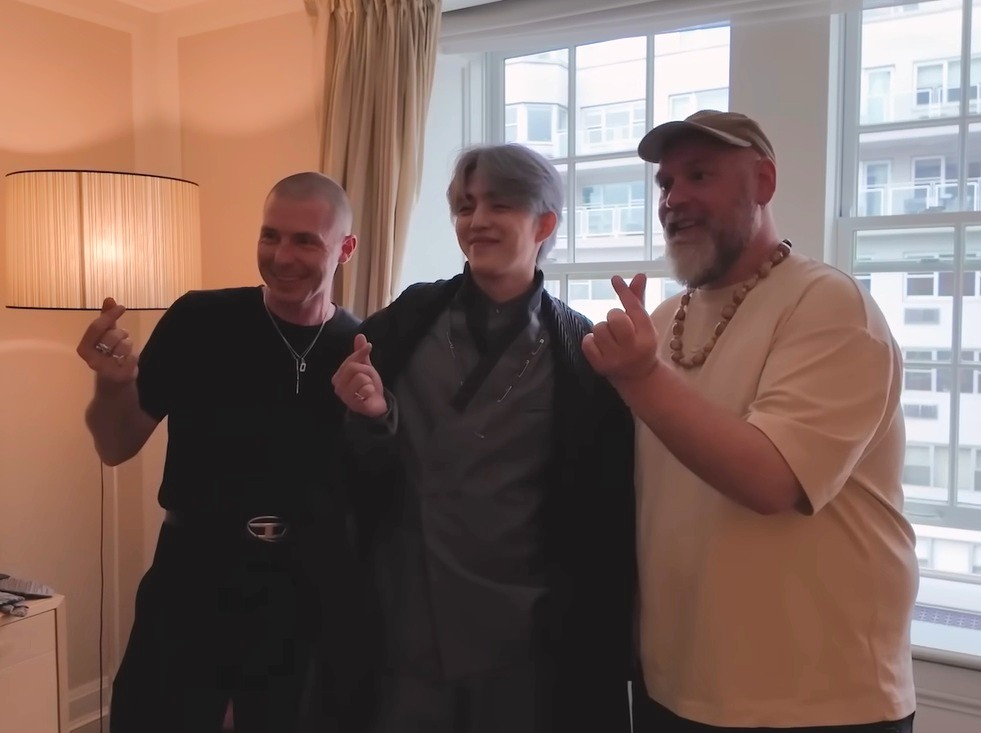
S.Coups at a fitting with Boss for the 2025 Met Gala

In July 2022, S.Coups was announced as Korean skincare brand Some By Mi's new global advertising model, starting in August of that year. Over the next two years, S.Coups participated in a number of pictorials for the brand's new product releases. In June 2024, S.Coups, alongside Seventeen members Wonwoo and Vernon, became the new global brand ambassador for Chitato, an Indonesian snack brand under Indofood.

In March 2024, S.Coups attended an event for luxury suitcase brand Rimowa in Seoul, alongside bandmate Wonwoo. In October 2026, S.Coups attended another event for the brand.

In September 2024, he attended the Loewe spring 2025 show at Paris Fashion Week, having previously attended a store opening for the brand in Seoul in July. He was then selected as a brand ambassador for the fashion house. In August, he was announced as the new brand model for Korean skincare brand Neogen. He was also revealed to be the new South Korean ambassador for French cosmetics company NARS Cosmetics alongside bandmate Hoshi that same month.

In April 2025, S.Coups was appointed to be the global ambassador of German fashion label Boss. The same month, he featured on the cover of a magazine for the first time, for the April edition of Numéro Tokyo. In May, he made his Met Gala debut, dressed by Boss in a jeogori-inspired outfit. Later that year, he closed the brand's spring/summer 2026 show at Milan Fashion Week, his first time walking a runway.

In July 2026, S.Coups and bandmate Mingyu were featured in the Korean launch campaign for Nütrl, a Singaporean brand of hard seltzers.

=== Philanthropy ===
In February 2023, S.Coups donated ₩20 million (US$15,106) to the Hope Bridge Korea Disaster Relief Association for relief efforts for the 2023 Turkey–Syria earthquakes. In October, he donated ₩30 million (US$22,647) to Weact, a shelter for rescued dogs, and named one of their rescue dogs "Carat", after the name of Seventeen's official fanclub. In December, he donated ₩50 million (US$42,694) to the non-profit organization Angels' Nest, a shelter for abandoned animals.

In August 2024, to commemorate his 29th birthday, S.Coups donated another ₩30 million (US$21,809) to Weact, again in the name of Seventeen's fanclub.

== Personal life ==
=== Health ===
In November 2019, while Seventeen was in the midst of its Ode to You World Tour, S.Coups was unable to complete the group's November 16 concert in Jakarta due to health problems. Two days later, Pledis Entertainment announced that he would temporarily suspend his activities after experiencing symptoms of psychological anxiety. The company stated that he was undergoing detailed examinations and required sufficient rest and stability. In May 2020, S.Coups reflected on the period in the documentary series Seventeen: Hit the Road, describing longstanding anxiety that had worsened during the tour and the pressure he felt to continue performing as the group's leader. In the first episode of Seventeen: Our Chapter, released in 2025, S.Coups disclosed that he has panic disorder.

==== Shoulder injury ====
On June 30, 2021, S.Coups fell while participating in a scheduled activity and struck his right shoulder on the ground, after which he received hospital treatment. He also sustained abrasions and lacerations to his right forehead, ear, and chin. He was advised to minimize movement of the shoulder while recovering. He consequently sat out that week's remaining promotional activities for Seventeen's eighth EP, Your Choice

==== Left knee injury and rehabilitation ====
On August 10, 2023, S.Coups injured his left knee while landing during a ball game being filmed for Seventeen content. An MRI revealed a ruptured anterior cruciate ligament (ACL). After preoperative treatment, he underwent both ACL reconstruction and anterolateral ligament (ALL) reconstruction on August 21, and was discharged on August 24. In October, nearly two months after the surgery, medical staff said the injured area remained vulnerable and that rehabilitation was at a critical stage, advising him to avoid physically strenuous activities. He therefore did not participate in most promotional activities for Seventeen's eleventh EP, Seventeenth Heaven, and missed the remaining dates of the group's Follow Tour while recovering.

By February 2024, S.Coups had improved sufficiently for medical staff to clear him to resume scheduled activities from March, provided that he avoided excessive strain on the injured area. Pledis stated that he would continue to undergo regular medical examinations and could participate only partially in performances where necessary. He returned to the stage with Seventeen at the Follow Again concerts at Incheon Asiad Main Stadium on March 30 and 31.

=== Military service ===
On 1 March 2024, Pledis Entertainment announced that S.Coups had received a Grade 5 classification under South Korea's military physical-grading system. The classification was attributed to his August 2023 rupture of the ACL in his left knee, the subsequent reconstructive surgery on his anterior cruciate and anterolateral ligaments, and his prolonged rehabilitation. He was consequently exempted from mandatory military service during peacetime and assigned to wartime labor service, under which he may be called up to support military affairs during wartime or an equivalent national emergency.

== Discography ==
=== Singles ===
Title	Year	Peak chart positions	Sales	Album
Title	Year	KOR	Sales	Album
"Superwoman" (Raina solo) (Orange Caramel featuring S.Coups)	2012	—	N/A	Lipstick
"Q&A" (with Ailee, Woozi, and Vernon)	2015	58	KOR: 91,343	Non-album singles
"Me" (난)	2023	—	N/A	Non-album singles
"—" denotes releases that did not chart or were not released in that region.

=== Other charted songs ===
Title	Year	Peak chart positions	Album
Title	Year	KOR	Album
"Jungle" (Note: Credited under Seventeen but is a solo track performed by S.Coups.)	2025	42	Happy Burstday

== Composition credits ==
All credits are adapted from the Korea Music Copyright Association unless otherwise noted.

Year	Artist	Song	Album	Lyrics		Music	
Year	Artist	Song	Album	Credited	With	Credited	With
2015	Seventeen	"Shining Diamond"	17 Carat	Yes	Woozi, Vernon, Kim Min-jeong	No	—N/a
2015	Seventeen	"Adore U"	17 Carat	Yes	Woozi, Vernon, Bumzu	No	—N/a
2015	Seventeen	"Ah Yeah"	17 Carat	Yes	Vernon, Wonwoo, Mingyu	No	—N/a
2015	Seventeen	"Fronting"	Boys Be	Yes	Woozi, Vernon, Mingyu, Wonwoo	No	—N/a
2015	Seventeen	"Mansae"	Boys Be	Yes	Woozi, Vernon, Mingyu, Wonwoo	No	—N/a
2015	Seventeen	"Rock"	Boys Be	Yes	Woozi, Vernon, Wonwoo	No	—N/a
2015	Seventeen	"Chuck"	Love & Letter	Yes	Woozi, Wonwoo, Mingyu, Vernon, Dino	No	—N/a
2015	Seventeen	"Pretty U"	Love & Letter	Yes	Woozi, Bumzu, Vernon, Seungkwan	No	—N/a
2015	Seventeen	"Hit Song"	Love & Letter	Yes	Bumzu, Mingyu, Vernon, Dino	No	—N/a
2015	Seventeen	"Drift Away"	Love & Letter	Yes	Woozi, Mingyu, Seungkwan, Hoshi	No	—N/a
2015	Seventeen	"Adore U" (Vocal Team)	Love & Letter	Yes	Woozi, Bumzu, Seungkwan, DK, Vernon	No	—N/a
2015	Seventeen	"Monday to Saturday" (Hip Hop Team)	Love & Letter	Yes	Woozi, Bumzu, Wonwoo, Mingyu, Vernon	Yes	Woozi, Bumzu, Vernon
2015	Seventeen	"Shining Diamond" (Performance Team)	Love & Letter	Yes	Woozi, Vernon, Kim Min-jeong	No	—N/a
2015	Seventeen	"Love Letter"	Love & Letter	Yes	Woozi, Wonwoo, Mingyu, Vernon	No	—N/a
2016	Seventeen	"No F.U.N"	Love & Letter - Repackage Album	Yes	Woozi, Hoshi, Vernon, Wonwoo, Seungkwan, Dino	No	—N/a
2016	Seventeen	"Very Nice"	Love & Letter - Repackage Album	Yes	Woozi, Vernon. Bumzu	No	—N/a
2016	Seventeen	"Healing"	Love & Letter - Repackage Album	Yes	Woozi, Mingyu, Vernon, Dino	No	—N/a
2016	Seventeen	"Space"	Love & Letter - Repackage Album	Yes	Wonwoo, Mingyu, Vernon, Bumzu	No	—N/a
2016	Seventeen	"Boom Boom"	Going Seventeen	Yes	Woozi, Vernon, Wonwoo, Mingyu, Bumzu	No	—N/a
2016	Seventeen	"Lean On Me"	Going Seventeen	Yes	Vernon, Wonwoo, Mingyu, Bumzu	No	—N/a
2016	Seventeen	"Fast Pace"	Going Seventeen	Yes	Woozi, Vernon, Hoshi	No	—N/a
2016	Seventeen	"I Don't Know"	Going Seventeen	Yes	Woozi, Vernon	No	—N/a
2017	Seventeen	"If I" (Hip Hop Team)	Al1	Yes	Vernon, Mingyu	No	—N/a
2017	Seventeen	"Crazy in Love"	Al1	Yes	Woozi, Vernon, Mingyu, Bumzu	No	—N/a
2017	Seventeen	"Change Up" (SVT Leaders)	Teen, Age	Yes	Woozi, Hoshi, Bumzu	No	—N/a
2017	Seventeen	"Without You"	Teen, Age	Yes	Woozi, Vernon, Jeonghan, Hoshi, The8, Mingyu, DK, Dino, Bumzu	No	—N/a
2017	Seventeen	"Trauma" (Hip Hop Team)	Teen, Age	Yes	Vernon, Wonwoo, Mingyu	No	—N/a
2017	Seventeen	"Flower" (S.Coups, Seungkwan, Wonwoo, The8, Jeonghan & Dino)	Teen, Age	Yes	Wonwoo, The8, Dino, Seungkwan, Jeonghan, Woozi, Bumzu	No	—N/a
2017	Seventeen	"Campfire"	Teen, Age	Yes	Woozi, Vernon, Jeonghan, Wonwoo, The8, Mingyu, DK, Seungkwan, Bumzu	No	—N/a
2018	Seventeen	"Thinkin' About You"	Director's Cut	Yes	Woozi, Bumzu, Vernon, Wonwoo, Mingyu	No	—N/a
2018	Seventeen	"Oh My!"	You Make My Day	Yes	Woozi, Bumzu, Vernon	No	—N/a
2018	Seventeen	"Holiday"	You Make My Day	Yes	Woozi, Bumzu, Vernon	Yes	Woozi, Bumzu, Park Ki-tae
2018	Seventeen	"What's Good" (Hip Hop Team)	You Make My Day	Yes	Wonwoo, Mingyu, Vernon	No	—N/a
2018	Seventeen	"Our dawn is hotter than day"	You Make My Day	Yes	Woozi, Bumzu, Wonwoo, Mingyu, Vernon	No	—N/a
2018	Seventeen	"Chilli" (Hip Hop Team)	You Made My Dawn	Yes	Vernon, Mingyu, Wonwoo	No	—N/a
2018	Seventeen	"Getting Closer"	You Made My Dawn	Yes	Woozi, Bumzu, Vernon	No	—N/a
2019	Seventeen	"Lie Again"	An Ode	Yes	Woozi, Bumzu, Vernon, Mingyu	No	—N/a
2019	Seventeen	"독 : Fear"	An Ode	Yes	Woozi, Bumzu, Vernon	No	—N/a
2019	Seventeen	"Let Me Hear You Say"	An Ode	Yes	Woozi, Bumzu, Vernon, Mingyu	No	—N/a
2019	Seventeen	"Back It Up" (Hip Hop Team)	An Ode	Yes	Woozi, Bumzu, Vernon, Mingyu	No	—N/a
2019	Seventeen	"Lucky"	An Ode	Yes	Woozi, Bumzu, Vernon, Mingyu, Seungkwan	No	—N/a
2019	Seventeen	"Snap Shoot"	An Ode	Yes	Woozi, Bumzu, Vernon, Mingyu	No	—N/a
2020	Seventeen	"My My"	Heng:garæ	Yes	Woozi, Bumzu, Vernon	No	—N/a
2020	Seventeen	"Kidult"	Heng:garæ	Yes	Bumzu, Woozi, Vernon	Yes	Bumzu, Woozi, Park Ki-tae
2020	Seventeen	"Together"	Heng:garæ	Yes	Woozi, Bumzu, Hoshi, Mingyu	No	—N/a
2020	Seventeen	"Ah! Love" (S.Coups, Jeonghan, Joshua)	Semicolon	Yes	Woozi, Bumzu, Jeonghan, Joshua	No	—N/a
2021	Seventeen	"Heaven's Cloud"	Your Choice	Yes	Woozi, Bumzu, Mingyu	No	—N/a
2021	Seventeen	"Ready To Love"	Your Choice	Yes	Woozi, Bumzu, Mingyu, danke, Bang Si-hyuk, Kyler Niko	No	—N/a
2021	Seventeen	"Anyone"	Your Choice	Yes	Woozi, Bumzu	No	—N/a
2021	Seventeen	"Gam3 Bo1" (Hip Hop Team)	Your Choice	Yes	Woozi, Bumzu, Wonwoo, Mingyu, Vernon	No	—N/a
2021	Seventeen	"I can't run away" (Hip Hop Team)	Attacca	Yes	Woozi, Bumzu, Wonwoo, Mingyu, Vernon	No	—N/a
2022	Seventeen	"IF you leave me"	Face the Sun	Yes	Woozi, Bumzu, Hoshi, Nmore	No	—N/a
2022	Seventeen	"_World"	Sector 17	Yes	Woozi, Bumzu, Vernon, Melanie Joy Fontana, Michel "Lindgren" Schulz	No	—N/a
2022	Seventeen	"Cheers" (SVT Leaders)	Sector 17	Yes	Woozi, Bumzu, Hoshi, Nmore	No	—N/a
2023	BSS	"Fighting"	Second Wind	No	—N/a	Yes	Woozi, Bumzu, Hoshi, Park Ki-tae
2023	Seventeen	"Super"	FML	Yes	Woozi, Bumzu, Vernon	No	—N/a
2023	Seventeen	"Fire" (Hip Hop Team)	FML	Yes	Woozi, Bumzu, Wonwoo, Mingyu, Vernon	No	—N/a
2023	Seventeen	"God of Music"	Seventeenth Heaven	Yes	Woozi, Bumzu, Mingyu, Vernon	No	—N/a
2023	Seventeen	"Diamond Days"	Seventeenth Heaven	Yes	Woozi, Bumzu, Vernon, Jeon Gan-dhi	No	—N/a
2023	Seventeen	"Monster" (Hip Hop Team)	Seventeenth Heaven	Yes	Woozi, Bumzu, Wonwoo, Mingyu, Vernon	No	—N/a
2023	S.Coups	"Me"	—N/a	Yes	Bumzu	Yes	Bumzu, Ohway!
2024	Seventeen	"Lalali" (Hip Hop Team)	17 Is Right Here	Yes	Woozi, Bumzu, Wonwoo, Mingyu, Vernon	No	—N/a
2024	Seventeen	"Eyes on You"	Spill the Feels	Yes	Woozi, Bumzu, Vernon	No	—N/a
2024	Seventeen	"Water" (Hip Hop Team)	Spill the Feels	Yes	Woozi, Bumzu, Wonwoo, Mingyu, Vernon	No	—N/a
2025	Seventeen	"Encircled" (동그라미)	Non-album single	Yes	Woozi, Wonwoo, Dino, Hoshi, Vernon, Mingyu, DK, Seungkwan, Jun, The8, Joshua	No	—N/a
2025	Seventeen	"Thunder"	Happy Burstday	No	—N/a	Yes	Woozi, Bumzu
2025	Seventeen	"Jungle" (S.Coups solo)	Happy Burstday	Yes	—N/a	Yes	Bumzu
