= Bumzu =

South Korean music producer (born 1991)

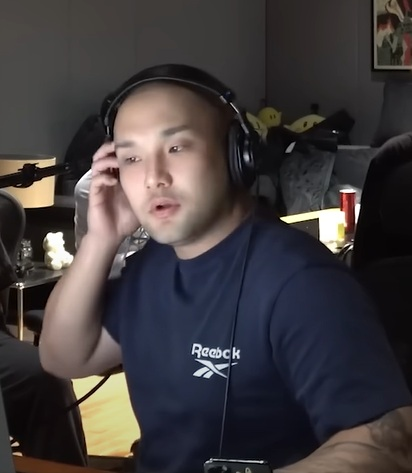
- Bumzu in 2023 producing Second Wind
- Born: Kye Beom-ju; November 8, 1991 (age 34); Seoul, South Korea
- Other names: Nusoul; Wasurenai; Baekgom
- Occupations: Singer; songwriter; record producer
- Musical career
- Genres: K-pop; R&B
- Instrument: Vocals
- Years active: 2011–present
- Labels: Pledis; Prismfilter

Korean name
- Hangul: 계범주
- RR: Gye Beomju
- MR: Kye Pŏmju

Kye Beom-ju (Korean: 계범주, born November 8, 1991), better known by the stage name Bumzu (범주), is a South Korean record producer, songwriter and singer. He signed to Pledis Entertainment early in his career, and has been co-CEO of the Prismfilter Music Group since 2016.

He is best known for his work with Pledis Entertainment labelmates NU'EST and Seventeen, and has amassed credits working with other South Korean artists including Shinee, Fromis 9, NCT 127, TWS, and BTS's Jin. Since 2019, he has been a full member of the Korea Music Copyright Association (KOMCA), a status given to music creators who meet the highest levels of professional standards and copyright royalties. In 2025, he also became a member of The Recording Academy.

== Biography and career ==
Bumzu was born in Seoul, South Korea, on November 8, 1991. He learned the violin as a child, and by the age of high school, he became active in Hongdae's underground music scene. His first mainstream work was composing for H.O.T's Jang Woo-hyuk's "Don't Go, Go Away" in 2011. He then participated in the singing competition show Superstar K 4 at the age of 22, which has been noted as his big break. Following the show, he began producing songs for Pledis artists including After School and NU'EST, and has produced songs alongside Woozi for Seventeen since their debut song "Adore U". He also worked on vocal coaching the members of Seventeen early in their careers.

Since 2016, he has been the co-CEO of the music production company Prismfilter Music Group. In 2024, Bumzu started producing music for Pledis' new group TWS under the pseudonym "Wasurenai". In February, he was awarded KOMCA's grand prize, having been the highest-earning songwriter for K-pop in 2023. On December 7, 2025, he won the Legendary Producer award at the 10th Asia Artist Awards, his second consecutive year winning a producer award at the ceremony. The same year, he became a member of The Recording Academy.

== Discography ==
=== Studio albums ===
Title	Album details	Peak chart positions
Title	Album details	KOR
Good Life	Released: July 30, 2015; Label: PJR Entertainment, LOEN Entertainment; Formats: CD, digital download; Track listing: 1. "Bucket List" (feat. Vernon of Seventeen); 2. "I Need You (Ya해)" (with Vernon); 3. "Give It 2 U" (feat. P.O of Block B & Nii Hwa); 4. "Good Life" (feat. Dok2 & The Quiett); 5. "Secret Love (잠깐 나올래)" (feat. 8Dro); 6. "Don't Know Why (왜이래)"; 7. "Beautiful"; 8. "TTT (퉤퉤퉤)" (feat. New Champ & Nucksal); 9. "Ceiling (낯선천장)" (feat. Muwoong Of Baechigi); 10. "Something Special" (feat. Dok2); 11. "28.5 (정인)" (feat. Jung-in)	59

=== Extended plays ===
Title	Album details	Peak chart positions
Title	Album details	KOR
Something Special	Released: September 27, 2013; Label: PJR Entertainment, LOEN Entertainment; Formats: CD, digital download; Track listing: 1. "Bucket List" (feat. Vernon of Seventeen); 2. "Hello 난 범주야"; 3. "2Star" (Feat. Ugly Duck); 4. "Something Special" (Feat. Dok2); 5. "99%"; 6. "Bingle Bangle" (Feat. Volume)	36
24	Released: December 12, 2014; Label: PJR Entertainment, LOEN Entertainment; Formats: CD, digital download; Track listing: 1. "When I'm Down" (미생) (Feat. Yoon Han); 2. "28.5" (Feat. Jung In); 3. "What About Me" (Feat. HuckleBerry P); 4. "Yeh Yeh" (스물넷 때가 타) (Feat. Don Mills); 5. "Miss U" (노래할 기분이 아니야)	66
27 (많지도 + 적지도 : 스물일곱)	Released: December 26, 2017; Label: Pledis Entertainment, LOEN Entertainment; Formats: CD, digital download; Track listing: 1. "How U Doing" (Feat. Soulstar); 2. "I'm Good" (아무렇지 않아) (Feat. Sik-K); 3. "High"; 4. "Once" (한 때) (Feat. Raina); 5. "Just"; 6. "A.C.C.E.L"	59

=== Singles ===
Title	Year	Peak chart positions	Sales (DL)	Album
Title	Year	KOR	Sales (DL)	Album
"Oh My Girl" feat. New Champ	2011	—	—N/a	Non-album singles
"I'm Sick Of It" (질릴만도한데) feat. 8Dro	2012	—	—N/a	Non-album singles
"The Ceiling" (낯선 천장) feat. Muwoong	2013	60	KOR: 76,114	Good Life
"Something Special" feat. Dok2	2013	63	KOR: 62,279	Good Life
"Game Over"	2014	96	KOR: 20,671	Non-album single
"28.5" feat. Jungin	2014	—	KOR: 14,266	Good Life
"Live" (살아)	2015	—	—N/a	Good Life
"Give It 2 U" feat. P.O, Niihwa	2015	—	KOR: 11,991	Good Life
"I Want You Back"	2016	—	—N/a	Non-album single
"Once" (한 때) feat. Raina	2017	—	—N/a	27
"Just"	2017	—	—N/a	27
"A.C.C.E.L"	2017	—	—N/a	27
"I'm Good" (아무렇지 않아) feat. Sik-K	2017	—	—N/a	27
"—" denotes releases that did not chart.

=== Collaborations ===
Year	Title	Other artist(s)
2011	"Just Friend"	Ven, Colson
2014	"Shall We Meet" (우리 한번 만나볼래요)	Tarin
2017	"Forever Young"	Han Dong-geun

=== Soundtrack appearances ===
Year	Title	Album
2015	"First Time" (첨이야)	A Girl Who Sees Smells OST

== Awards ==
List of awards and nominations
Award ceremony	Year	Category	Nominee(s)	Result	Ref.
Asia Artist Awards	2024	Best Producer	Bumzu	Won	
Asia Artist Awards	2025	Legendary Producer	Bumzu	Won	
KOMCA Copyright Awards	2024	Daesang – Lyric writing and Composition	Bumzu	Won	
KOMCA Copyright Awards	2025	Daesang – Lyric writing, Composition, and Arrangement	Bumzu	Won	
