= List of music releases by Seventeen and its members =

Chronological list of music releases by Seventeen and its members

This is a list of music releases by Seventeen and its members, covering music released since Seventeen's debut in May 2015. It includes releases by Seventeen (listed under Seventeen discography), its subunits and individual members, as well as collaborations and releases by other artists featuring one or more members as performers.

A recording is included when sources show that it was formally distributed as a music release, such as through an official release notice or a standard listing on a music service. The platform alone does not determine inclusion. For example, YouTube treats ordinary channel uploads differently from official music releases delivered by a label or distributor to YouTube Music. These criteria reflect the current scope of the list and may change in the future. Other recordings may be added or covered in a separate section.

The list includes albums, extended plays (EPs), single albums, singles, soundtrack releases, live recordings and other music releases. When a member appears on only part of another artist's release, only those recordings are listed. Reissues, alternate editions and later releases of the same recordings are not listed separately unless they include new recordings or are officially released as a repackage album. Releases on which a member is credited only for music production, without performing on the recording, are excluded.

== Releases ==
This list covers officially distributed releases from 2015 onward.

Years: 2015 · 2016 · 2017 · 2018 · 2019 · 2020 · 2021 · 2022 · 2023 · 2024 · 2025 · 2026

Key

Seventeen Korean comeback release
Seventeen Japanese comeback release
Other Japanese-language release (Release cell only)
Other Chinese-language release (Release cell only)

Date	Release	Artist(s)	Parent release	Format	Type	Member(s)	Notes	Ref.
May 29, 2015	17 CARAT: 1. "Shining Diamond"; 2. "Adore U"; 3. "Ah Yeah"; 4. "Jam Jam"; 5. "20"	Seventeen	—	EP	Seventeen	All members	1st Mini Album	
July 11, 2015	"Lotto (feat. Don Mills) (Prod. by Gonzo)"	Vernon feat. Don Mills	—	Single	Solo	Vernon	—	
July 30, 2015	"Bucket List"	Bumzu feat. Vernon	Good Life	Album track	As featured artist	Vernon	Track 1	
September 10, 2015	BOYS BE: 1. "Fronting"; 2. "Mansae"; 3. "When I Grow Up"; 4. "OMG"; 5. "Rock"	Seventeen	—	EP	Seventeen	All members	2nd Mini Album	
December 4, 2015	"Q&A"	Seventeen & Ailee	—	Single	Collaboration	S.Coups, Woozi, Vernon	—	
February 12, 2016	"Chocolate"	Yoon Jong-shin & Seventeen	—	Single	Collaboration	Jeonghan, Joshua, Woozi, DK, Seungkwan	—	
March 23, 2016	"Sickness" (병) (feat. Pledis Girlz)	Vernon feat. Pledis Girlz	—	Soundtrack single	Solo	Vernon	Love Revolution webtoon soundtrack	
April 25, 2016	FIRST 'LOVE & LETTER': 1. "Chuck"; 2. "Pretty U"; 3. "Still Lonely"; 4. "Hit Song"; 5. "Say Yes"; 6. "Drift Away"; 7. "Adore U (Vocal Team Ver.)"; 8. "Monday to Saturday (Hiphop Team Ver.)"; 9. "Shining Diamond (Performance Team Ver.)"; 10. "Love Letter"	Seventeen	—	Studio album	Seventeen	All members	1st Album	
June 17, 2016	"어떻게 사랑이 그래요"	Seungkwan & Lee Ji-yong	듀엣가요제 11회	Live compilation track	Collaboration	Seungkwan	Track 2	
July 4, 2016	Love&Letter Repackage Album: 1. "No F.U.N"; 2. "Very Nice"; 3. "Healing"; 4. "Simple"; 5. "Space"; 6. "Chuck"; 7. "Pretty U"; 8. "Still Lonely"; 9. "Hit Song"; 10. "Say Yes"; 11. "Drift Away"; 12. "Adore U (Vocal Team Ver.)"; 13. "Monday to Saturday (Hiphop Team Ver.)"; 14. "Shining Diamond (Performance Team Ver.)"; 15. "Love Letter"	Seventeen	—	Reissue	Seventeen	All members	Repackage album	
July 31, 2016	"The Fall of the Moon" (달의 몰락)	Dokyeom	Mask Singer 70th (Live Version)	Live compilation track	Solo	DK	Track 2	
July 31, 2016	"Fate" (인연)	Dokyeom	Mask Singer 70th (Live Version)	Live compilation track	Solo	DK	Track 4	
September 6, 2016	"YOSM (feat. Woozi)"	Kanto feat. Woozi	14216	Single	As featured artist	Woozi	Pre-release single; later included on 14216	
December 5, 2016	Going Seventeen: 1. "Beautiful"; 2. "Boom Boom"; 3. "Highlight"; 4. "Lean on Me"; 5. "Fast Pace"; 6. "Don't Listen in Secret"; 7. "I Don't Know"; 8. "Smile Flower"	Seventeen	—	EP	Seventeen	All members	3rd Mini Album	
May 22, 2017	Al1: 1. "Don't Wanna Cry"; 2. "Habit"; 3. "If I"; 4. "Swimming Fool"; 5. "My I"; 6. "Crazy in Love"; 7. "Who"; 8. "Check-In (Remastering)"	Seventeen	—	EP	Seventeen	All members	4th Mini Album; Tracks 7–8 CD only	
August 9, 2017	"Cinematic Love" (한 편의 너)	Yang Da-il & Dokyeom	—	Single	Collaboration	DK	—	
November 6, 2017	TEEN, AGE: 1. "Intro. New World"; 2. "Change Up"; 3. "Without You"; 4. "Clap"; 5. "Bring It"; 6. "Lilili Yabbay"; 7. "Trauma"; 8. "Pinwheel"; 9. "Flower"; 10. "Rocket"; 11. "Hello"; 12. "Campfire"; 13. "Outro. Incompletion"	Seventeen	—	Studio album	Seventeen	All members	2nd Album	
January 7, 2018	"With You" (어깨)	Solbin & Seungkwan	Mask Singer 135th	Live compilation track	Collaboration	Seungkwan	Track 1	
January 14, 2018	"Sorry" (연)	Seungkwan	Mask Singer 136th	Live compilation track	Solo	Seungkwan	Track 2	
February 5, 2018	DIRECTOR'S CUT: 1. "Thinkin' About You"; 2. "Thanks"; 3. "Run to You"; 4. "Falling for U"; 5. "Intro. New World"; 6. "Change Up"; 7. "Without You"; 8. "Clap"; 9. "Bring It"; 10. "Lilili Yabbay"; 11. "Trauma"; 12. "Pinwheel"; 13. "Flower"; 14. "Rocket"; 15. "Hello"; 16. "Campfire"; 17. "Outro. Incompletion"	Seventeen	—	Reissue	Seventeen	All members	Special album	
March 15, 2018	"Kind of Love" (어떤 사랑)	Seungkwan	Mother (Original Soundtrack), Pt. 5	Soundtrack single	Solo	Seungkwan	Original and instrumental versions	
March 21, 2018	"Just Do It" (거침없이)	BSS	—	Single	Subunit	Hoshi, DK, Seungkwan	—	
April 10, 2018	"Missed Connections" (내가 먼저)	Dokyeom	Tempted (Original Soundtrack), Pt. 3	Soundtrack single	Solo	DK	Original and instrumental versions	
May 5, 2018	"Short Hair" (단발머리)	Seventeen	Immortal Songs: Singing the Legend – Cho Yong-pil 2	Live compilation track	Seventeen	All members	Track 3	
May 30, 2018	WE MAKE YOU: 1. "Call Call Call!"; 2. "Highlight (Japanese ver.)" 3. "Lean on Me (Japanese ver.)" 4. "20 (Japanese ver.)" 5. "Love Letter (Japanese ver.)"	Seventeen	—	EP	Seventeen	All members	Japan 1st Mini Album	
July 12, 2018	"我明白 (Live)"	Jun	潮音战纪 第1期 (Live)	Live compilation track	Solo	Jun	Track 3	
July 16, 2018	YOU MAKE MY DAY: 1. "Oh My!"; 2. "Holiday"; 3. "Come to Me"; 4. "What's Good"; 5. "Moonwalker"; 6. "Our Dawn Is Hotter Than Day"	Seventeen	—	EP	Seventeen	All members	5th Mini Album	
July 19, 2018	"拍手 (Live)"	The8	潮音战纪 第2期 (Live)	Live compilation track	Solo	The8	Track 5	
August 2, 2018	"MY I (Live)"	The8 & Jun	潮音战纪 第4期 (Live)	Live compilation track	Collaboration	Jun, The8	Track 1	
August 9, 2018	"开到荼蘼 (Live)"	Jun & Yan An	潮音战纪 第5期	Live compilation track	Collaboration	Jun	Track 3	
August 9, 2018	"小星星 (Live)"	Zhou Zhennan & The8	潮音战纪 第5期	Live compilation track	Collaboration	The8	Track 5	
August 13, 2018	"A-TEEN"	Seventeen	A-TEEN (Original Soundtrack), Pt. 3	Soundtrack single	Seventeen	Joshua, Hoshi, Woozi, Vernon, Dino	—	
August 16, 2018	"夜太黑 (Live)"	Jun	潮音战纪 第6期	Live compilation track	Solo	Jun	Track 2	
August 16, 2018	"秘密 (Live)"	The8 & Victor Ma	潮音战纪 第6期	Live compilation track	Collaboration	The8	Track 3	
August 23, 2018	"BB 88 (Live)"	Tia Ray, Jun & Yan An	潮音战纪 第7期	Live compilation track	Collaboration	Jun	Track 1	
August 23, 2018	"我愿意 (Live)"	Liu Xijun, The8 & Victor Ma	潮音战纪 第7期	Live compilation track	Collaboration	The8	Track 2	
August 28, 2018	"Oh My! (Chinese ver.)"	Seventeen	—	Single	Seventeen	All members	—	
August 30, 2018	"超自然 (Live)"	Victor Ma & The8	潮音战纪 第8期	Live compilation track	Collaboration	The8	Track 1	
September 6, 2018	"In My Feelings (Live)"	Victor Ma & The8	潮音战纪 第9期	Live compilation track	Collaboration	The8	Track 1	
September 6, 2018	"忙与盲 (Live)"	Victor Ma & The8	潮音战纪 第9期	Live compilation track	Collaboration	The8	Track 3	
September 6, 2018	"欲望反光 (Live)"	Jun	潮音战纪 第9期	Live compilation track	Solo	Jun	Track 6	
September 7, 2018	"Rocket (English Version Live)"	Vernon & Joshua	中国音乐公告牌 第1期 (Live)	Live compilation track	Collaboration	Vernon, Joshua	Track 5	
September 13, 2018	"Just……普通friends (Live)"	Victor Ma & The8	潮音战纪 第10期	Live compilation track	Collaboration	The8	Track 2	
September 13, 2018	"Fall In Love (Live)"	Victor Ma & The8	潮音战纪 第10期	Live compilation track	Collaboration	The8	Track 5	
September 13, 2018	"末路狂花 (Live)"	Jun	潮音战纪 第10期	Live compilation track	Solo	Jun	Track 8	
November 14, 2018	"Bumaye (Remix) (feat. Bizzy & Vernon)"	Drunken Tiger feat. Bizzy & Vernon	Drunken Tiger X: Rebirth of Tiger JK	Album track	As featured artist	Vernon	—	
December 14, 2018	"能不能坐在我身旁"	Jun	—	Single	Solo	Jun	Special single album	
January 21, 2019	YOU MADE MY DAWN: 1. "Good to Me"; 2. "Home"; 3. "Hug"; 4. "Chilli"; 5. "Shhh"; 6. "Getting Closer"	Seventeen	—	EP	Seventeen	All members	6th Mini Album	
March 1, 2019 (Note: The official music video was published on February 28, 2019; Kugou Music lists the Chinese digital single as released on March 1.)	"Home (Chinese Ver.)"	Seventeen	—	Single	Seventeen	All members	—	
April 5, 2019	"Highlight (Live)"	The8, Li Zhenning, Shi Mingze, Zhan Yu, Bo Yuan, Wen Yechen, Shen Qunfeng & Wu Zelin	青春有你 第11期 (Live)	Live compilation track	Collaboration	The8	Track 5	
May 17, 2019	"兄弟一回"	Jun & The8	七日生 电视剧原声带	Soundtrack album track	Collaboration	Jun, The8	Track 1	
May 19, 2019	"9-TEEN"	Seventeen	A-TEEN2 Part.2	Soundtrack single	Seventeen	All members	—	
May 29, 2019	Happy Ending: 1. "Happy Ending"; 2. "Oh My! (Japanese ver.)" 3. "Healing (Japanese ver.)"	Seventeen	—	Single	Seventeen	All members	Japan 1st Single	
June 9, 2019	"Dreams Come True"	The8	—	Single	Solo	The8	—	
August 2, 2019	"Looped Up (feat. Vernon)"	tobi lou feat. Vernon	Live on Ice	Album track	As featured artist	Vernon	—	
August 5, 2019	"HIT"	Seventeen	An Ode	Single	Seventeen	All members	Pre-release single	
September 16, 2019	An Ode: 1. "HIT"; 2. "Lie Again"; 3. "Fear"; 4. "Let Me Hear You Say"; 5. "247"; 6. "Second Life"; 7. "Network Love"; 8. "Back It Up"; 9. "Lucky"; 10. "Snap Shoot"; 11. "Happy Ending (Korean ver.)"	Seventeen	—	Studio album	Seventeen	All members	3rd Album	
October 8, 2019	"My Flesh, My Blood, My Skin, My Bones" (난 나의 것)	Dokyeom	Musical Xcalibur World Premiere Live Recording Original Cast 2019	Live cast recording track	Solo	DK	CD 1, track 4	
October 8, 2019	"Let the Sword Make This Man" (검이 한 사람을)	Dokyeom, Uhm Ki-joon, knights & ensemble	Musical Xcalibur World Premiere Live Recording Original Cast 2019	Live cast recording track	Collaboration	DK	CD 1, track 8	
October 8, 2019	"Remember This Night" (기억해 이 밤)	Dokyeom, Son Jun-ho & ensemble	Musical Xcalibur World Premiere Live Recording Original Cast 2019	Live cast recording track	Collaboration	DK	CD 1, track 16	
October 8, 2019	"Go It Alone" (혼자서 가)	Dokyeom & Lee Ji-hoon	Musical Xcalibur World Premiere Live Recording Original Cast 2019	Live cast recording track	Collaboration	DK	CD 2, track 4	
October 8, 2019	"Murmur of the Heart" (심장의 침묵)	Dokyeom	Musical Xcalibur World Premiere Live Recording Original Cast 2019	Live cast recording track	Solo	DK	CD 2, track 6	
October 8, 2019	"Eye for an Eye Reprise" (눈에는 눈 리프라이즈)	Dokyeom, Lee Sang-jun, priest, Saxons & ensemble	Musical Xcalibur World Premiere Live Recording Original Cast 2019	Live cast recording track	Collaboration	DK	CD 2, track 9	
October 8, 2019	"In Troubled Times Like These" (이렇게 우리 만난 건)	Dokyeom & Min Kyung-ah	Musical Xcalibur World Premiere Live Recording Original Cast 2019	Live cast recording track	Collaboration	DK	CD 3, track 2	
October 8, 2019	"What Does It Mean to Be a King" (왕이 된다는 것)	Dokyeom	Musical Xcalibur World Premiere Live Recording Original Cast 2019	Live cast recording track	Solo	DK	CD 3, track 15	
October 15, 2019	"Miracle"	Woozi	The Tale of Nokdu (Original Soundtrack), Pt. 3	Soundtrack single	Solo	Woozi	Original and instrumental versions	
December 1, 2019	"SWEETEST THING"	Seventeen	Chocolate OST Part.1	Soundtrack single	Seventeen	Joshua, Wonwoo, DK, Seungkwan, Dino	Original and instrumental versions	
April 1, 2020	舞い落ちる花びら (Fallin' Flower): 1. "Fallin' Flower"; 2. "Good to Me (Japanese ver.)" 3. "Smile Flower (Japanese ver.)"	Seventeen	—	Single	Seventeen	All members	Japan 2nd Single	
May 8, 2020	"那幕 (Falling Down)"	The8	—	Single	Solo	The8	—	
June 22, 2020	Heng:garae: 1. "Fearless"; 2. "Left & Right"; 3. "I Wish"; 4. "My My"; 5. "Kidult"; 6. "Together"	Seventeen	—	EP	Seventeen	All members	7th Mini Album	
June 30, 2020	"Maze"	The8	—	Soundtrack single	Solo	The8	Chinese-language OST for The King: Eternal Monarch	
July 2, 2020	"Dream"	Jun	—	Soundtrack single	Solo	Jun	Chinese-language OST for The King: Eternal Monarch	
September 7, 2020	"Go"	Seungkwan	Record of Youth (Original Television Soundtrack), Pt. 1	Soundtrack single	Solo	Seungkwan	Original and instrumental versions	
September 9, 2020	24H: 1. "24H"; 2. "Pinwheel (Japanese ver.)" 3. "247 (Japanese ver.)" 4. "Chilli (Japanese ver.)" 5. "Together (Japanese ver.)"	Seventeen	—	EP	Seventeen	All members	Japan 2nd Mini Album	
September 17, 2020	"17 (feat. Joshua & DK of SEVENTEEN)"	Pink Sweat$ feat. Joshua & DK	—	Single	As featured artist	Joshua, DK	Remix of "17"	
October 19, 2020	; [Semicolon]: 1. "Home;Run"; 2. "Do Re Mi"; 3. "Hey Buddy"; 4. "Light a Flame"; 5. "Ah! Love"; 6. "All My Love"	Seventeen	—	Special album	Seventeen	All members	—	
January 29, 2021	"The Reason" (이유)	Seungkwan	Lovestruck in the City (Original Television Soundtrack), Pt. 6	Soundtrack single	Solo	Seungkwan	Original and instrumental versions	
February 5, 2021	"乌鸦 (Crow)"	Jun	寂寞号登机口 (Silent Boarding Gate)	Single	Solo	Jun	Pre-release single	
February 14, 2021	寂寞号登机口 (Silent Boarding Gate): 1. "Silent Boarding Gate"; 2. "Crow"	Jun	—	Digital single	Solo	Jun	2 tracks	
April 2, 2021	"Spider"	Hoshi	—	Single	Solo; Mixtape	Hoshi	—	
April 13, 2021	Side By Side; Chinese ver. Korean ver.: 1. "Side By Side" (Chinese ver.); 2. "Side By Side" (Korean ver.)	The8	—	Digital single album	Solo	The8	Chinese and Korean versions	
April 21, 2021	ひとりじゃない (Not Alone): 1. "Not Alone"; 2. "Run to You (Japanese ver.)" 3. "Home;Run (Japanese ver.)"	Seventeen	—	Single	Seventeen	All members	Japan 3rd Single	
May 4, 2021	"妈妈的未接来电" (Missed Call from Mom)	Jun & The8	—	Charity single	Collaboration	Jun, The8	—	
May 28, 2021	"Bittersweet" (feat. Lee Hi)	Wonwoo & Mingyu feat. Lee Hi	—	Digital single	Collaboration	Wonwoo, Mingyu	—	
June 18, 2021	YOUR CHOICE: 1. "Heaven's Cloud"; 2. "Ready to Love"; 3. "Anyone"; 4. "GAM3 BO1"; 5. "Wave"; 6. "Same Dream, Same Mind, Same Night"	Seventeen	—	EP	Seventeen	All members	8th Mini Album	
June 23, 2021	"Warrior" (逆燃)	Seventeen	你微笑时很美 Falling Into Your Smile OST	Soundtrack album track	Seventeen	Joshua, Jun, The8, Mingyu, Vernon	Track 7	
August 13, 2021	"Is It Still Beautiful" (여전히 아름다운지)	Seventeen	Hospital Playlist Season 2, Pt. 8 (Original Television Soundtrack)	Soundtrack single	Seventeen	Woozi, DK, Seungkwan	Original and instrumental versions	
October 22, 2021	Attacca: 1. "To You"; 2. "Rock with You"; 3. "Crush"; 4. "PANG!"; 5. "Imperfect Love"; 6. "I Can't Run Away"; 7. "2 Minus 1"	Seventeen	—	EP	Seventeen	All members	9th Mini Album; Track 7 digital only	
December 3, 2021	"藏 (Hide)"	The8	—	Soundtrack single	Solo	The8	Original and accompaniment versions	
December 8, 2021	あいのちから (Power of Love): 1. "Power of Love"; 2. "Home (Japanese ver.)" 3. "Snap Shoot (Japanese ver.)"	Seventeen	—	Single	Seventeen	All members	Japan Special Single	
January 3, 2022	"Ruby"	Woozi	—	Single	Solo; Mixtape	Woozi	—	
February 25, 2022	"Beg for You" (feat. Rina Sawayama)	Charli XCX, Rina Sawayama, A. G. Cook & Vernon	—	Single	Collaboration	Vernon	A. G. Cook & VERNON OF SEVENTEEN Remix	
February 27, 2022	"Go!"	Dokyeom	Twenty-Five Twenty-One, Pt. 5 (Original Television Soundtrack)	Soundtrack single	Solo	DK	Original and instrumental versions	
March 18, 2022	"海城 (Hai Cheng)"	The8	—	Single	Solo	The8	—	
April 15, 2022	"Darl+ing"	Seventeen	Face the Sun	Single	Seventeen	All members	Pre-release single	
May 17, 2022	"Wrecker"	Omega Sapien feat. Vernon	Wuga	Single	As featured artist	Vernon	Pre-release single	
May 27, 2022	Face the Sun: 1. "Darl+ing"; 2. "HOT"; 3. "DON QUIXOTE"; 4. "March"; 5. "Domino"; 6. "Shadow"; 7. "'bout you" 8. "IF you leave me" 9. "Ash"	Seventeen	—	Studio album	Seventeen	All members	4th Album	
June 28, 2022	"Pit a Pat"	Seungkwan	Link: Eat, Love, Kill (Original Television Soundtrack), Pt. 4	Soundtrack single	Solo	Seungkwan	Original and instrumental versions	
July 18, 2022	SECTOR 17: 1. "Circles"; 2. "_WORLD"; 3. "Fallin' Flower (Korean ver.)" 4. "CHEERS"; 5. "Darl+ing"; 6. "HOT"; 7. "DON QUIXOTE"; 8. "March"; 9. "Domino"; 10. "Shadow"; 11. "'bout you" 12. "IF you leave me" 13. "Ash"	Seventeen	—	Reissue	Seventeen	All members	Repackage album	
August 16, 2022	"DIE SCHATTEN WERDEN LAENGER"	Kai & Dokyeom	KAI ON MUSICAL	Musical album track	As featured artist	DK	Track 21	
August 26, 2022	"_WORLD (feat. Anne-Marie)"	Seventeen & Anne-Marie	—	Single	Collaboration	All members	Alternate version of "_WORLD" from Sector 17	
September 23, 2022	LIMBO; Chinese ver. Korean ver.: 1. "LIMBO" (Chinese ver.); 2. "LIMBO" (Korean ver.)	Jun	—	Digital single	Solo	Jun	Chinese and Korean versions	
September 27, 2022	"尝一口夏天" (A Bite of Summer)	The8	—	Single	Solo	The8	Original, instrumental and accompaniment versions	
September 30, 2022	"As It Was - Spotify Singles"	Seungkwan	—	Single	Solo	Seungkwan	—	
November 9, 2022	DREAM: 1. "DREAM"; 2. "Rock with you (Japanese ver.)" 3. "All My Love (Japanese ver.)" 4. "Darl+ing (Holiday ver.)"	Seventeen	—	EP	Seventeen	All members	Japan 1st EP	
December 23, 2022	"Black Eye"	Vernon	—	Single	Solo; Mixtape	Vernon	—	
January 17, 2023	"BETTING"	Shingo Katori × Seventeen	—	Soundtrack single	Collaboration	Jeonghan, Mingyu, Seungkwan	—	
February 6, 2023	SECOND WIND: 1. "Fighting" (feat. Lee Young-ji); 2. "Lunch"; 3. "7PM" (feat. Peder Elias)	BSS	—	Single album	Subunit	Hoshi, DK, Seungkwan	1st Single Album	
April 24, 2023	FML: 1. "F*ck My Life"; 2. "Super"; 3. "Fire"; 4. "I Don't Understand But I Luv U"; 5. "Dust"; 6. "April Shower"	Seventeen	—	EP	Seventeen	All members	10th Mini Album	
May 19, 2023	"Still You"	Seungkwan	Romantic Doctor 3 (Original Soundtrack) Pt.4	Soundtrack single	Solo	Seungkwan	Original and instrumental versions	
July 4, 2023	"PSYCHO"	Jun	—	Digital single	Solo	Jun	—	
July 21, 2023	"Our Vacation"	Lee Seung-gi, Yoo Yeon-seok, Kyuhyun, Ji Suk-jin, Lee Dong-hwi, Jo Se-ho, Joshua & Hoshi	Bro & Marble OST Part.1	Soundtrack EP track	Collaboration	Joshua, Hoshi	Track 1	
July 26, 2023	"独家童话"	Jun	— (Note: The song was originally released as a soundtrack single on July 26, 2023. The same recording was later included on a four-track soundtrack EP released on July 28, 2025.)	Soundtrack single	Solo	Jun	Exclusive Fairy Tale theme song; original and accompaniment versions	
July 28, 2023	"SHINGIRU"	Joshua & Hoshi	Bro & Marble OST Part.2	Soundtrack EP track	Collaboration	Joshua, Hoshi	Track 1	
August 16, 2023	"Sara Sara"	Seventeen	Always Yours	Single	Seventeen	All members	Pre-release single	
August 23, 2023	ALWAYS YOURS: 1. "Ima -Even if the world ends tomorrow-" 2. "Sara Sara"; 3. "Call Call Call!"; 4. "Happy Ending"; 5. "Fallin' Flower"; 6. "24H"; 7. "Not Alone"; 8. "Power of Love"; 9. "Dream"; 10. "Highlight (Japanese ver.)" 11. "Lean on Me (Japanese ver.)" 12. "20 (Japanese ver.)" 13. "Love Letter (Japanese ver.)" 14. "Oh My! (Japanese ver.)" 15. "Healing (Japanese ver.)" 16. "Good to Me (Japanese ver.)" 17. "Smile Flower (Japanese ver.)" 18. "Pinwheel (Japanese ver.)" 19. "247 (Japanese ver.)" 20. "Chilli (Japanese ver.)" 21. "Together (Japanese ver.)" 22. "Run to You (Japanese ver.)" 23. "Home;Run (Japanese ver.)" 24. "Home (Japanese ver.)" 25. "Snap Shoot (Japanese ver.)" 26. "Rock with You (Japanese ver.)" 27. "All My Love (Japanese ver.)"	Seventeen	—	Compilation album	Seventeen	All members	Japan Best Album	
September 1, 2023	"Dirty Dancing"	New Kids on the Block feat. Joshua, DK & Dino	—	Single	As featured artist	Joshua, DK, Dino	Dem Jointz remix	
October 23, 2023	SEVENTEENTH HEAVEN: 1. "SOS"; 2. "God of Music"; 3. "Diamond Days"; 4. "Back 2 Back"; 5. "Monster"; 6. "Yawn"; 7. "Headliner"; 8. "God of Music (Instrumental)"	Seventeen	—	EP	Seventeen	All members	11th Mini Album	
November 1, 2023	"Screen Time" (feat. Hoshi) "Screen Time" (B-Roll Version; feat. Hoshi) "Screen Time" (Voice Only)	Epik High	Screen Time	EP tracks	As featured artist	Hoshi	Tracks 1, 2 and 4	
November 4, 2023	"ICARUS"	Dino	CASTAWAY DIVA (Original Soundtrack), Pt. 3	Soundtrack single	Solo	Dino	Original and instrumental versions	
November 27, 2023	"Wait"	Dino	—	Single	Solo; Mixtape	Dino	—	
December 3, 2023	"Short Hair"	Dokyeom	Welcome to Samdal-ri (Original Television Soundtrack), Pt.1	Soundtrack single	Solo	DK	Original and instrumental versions	
December 19, 2023	"The Moment You Arrive"	Seungkwan	Tell Me That You Love Me, Pt. 4 (Original Soundtrack)	Soundtrack single	Solo	Seungkwan	Original and instrumental versions	
December 26, 2023	God of Light Music: 1. "God of Light Music"; 2. "God of Music (Trot Remix)"; 3. "God of Light Music (Instrumental)"	Seventeen	—	Single	Seventeen	All members	—	
January 18, 2024	Fly! Birdy Friends (Original Soundtrack); Korean ver. Chinese ver.: 1. "Fly! Birdy Friends (Korean Version)"; 2. "Fly! Birdy Friends (Chinese Version)"; 3. "Fly! Birdy Friends (Instrumental)"	The8	—	Soundtrack single	Solo	The8	Korean, Chinese and instrumental versions	
January 26, 2024	"What Kind of Future"	Woozi	—	Single	Solo	Woozi	—	
February 16, 2024	"Super (Workout Remix)"	Seventeen	—	Single	Seventeen	All members	Remix	
February 26, 2024	"Dandelion"	Seungkwan	—	Single	Solo	Seungkwan	—	
March 4, 2024	"Goddess of Despair"	Hoshi	—	Soundtrack single	Solo	Hoshi	ASTRA: Knights of Veda collaboration OST	
March 10, 2024	"The Reasons of My Smiles"	BSS	Queen of Tears (Original Television Soundtrack), Pt.1	Soundtrack single	Subunit	Hoshi, DK, Seungkwan	Original and instrumental versions	
March 20, 2024	Lonely Stars; Korean ver. English ver. Japanese ver.: 1. "Lonely Stars" (Korean ver.); 2. "Lonely Stars" (English ver.); 3. "Lonely Stars" (Japanese ver.)	Seungkwan	—	Soundtrack single	Solo	Seungkwan	ASTRA: Knights of Veda collaboration OST	
April 29, 2024	17 IS RIGHT HERE Disc 1: 1. "MAESTRO"; 2. "LALALI"; 3. "Spell"; 4. "Cheers to Youth"; 5. "Call Call Call! (Korean ver.)" 6. "Happy Ending (Korean ver.)" 7. "Fallin' Flower (Korean ver.)" 8. "24H (Korean ver.)" 9. "Not Alone (Korean ver.)" 10. "Power of Love (Korean ver.)" 11. "Dream (Korean ver.)" 12. "Ima -Even if the world ends tomorrow- (Korean ver.)"; Disc 2: 1. "Adore U"; 2. "Mansae"; 3. "Pretty U"; 4. "Very Nice"; 5. "BoomBoom"; 6. "Don't Wanna Cry"; 7. "Clap"; 8. "Thanks"; 9. "Oh My!"; 10. "Home"; 11. "Fear"; 12. "Left & Right"; 13. "Home;Run"; 14. "Ready to Love"; 15. "Rock with You"; 16. "HOT"; 17. "_WORLD"; 18. "F*ck My Life"; 19. "Super"; 20. "God of Music"; 21. "Adore U (Instrumental)"	Seventeen	—	Compilation album	Seventeen	All members	Best album "Adore U (Instrumental)" digital only	
May 3, 2024	MAESTRO (Orchestra Remix): 1. "MAESTRO"; 2. "MAESTRO (Orchestra Remix)"; 3. "MAESTRO (Instrumental)"	Seventeen	—	Single	Seventeen	All members	3 tracks	
June 4, 2024	"時光語墨 (Time Spoken in Ink)"	The8	—	Soundtrack single	Solo	The8	My Wife's Double Life OST; original and accompaniment versions	
June 5, 2024 (Note: First released on Chinese streaming services on June 5, 2024, followed by a global streaming release on June 11.)	"赤脚的人 (Run Like Gump)"	Jun	—	Single	Solo	Jun	2024 Midsummer Graduation Gala theme song	
June 17, 2024	THIS MAN: 1. "Last Night (Guitar by Park Juwon)"; 2. "Beautiful Monster"; 3. "Leftover"	JxW	—	Single album	Subunit	Jeonghan, Wonwoo	1st Single Album	
June 26, 2024	"Steal the Show"	Dokyeom	—	YouTube Music release	Solo	DK	Cover; YouTube Music exclusive	
July 27, 2024	"风吹来的时候 (When the Wind Blows)"	The8	—	Soundtrack single	Solo	The8	Love's Rebellion OST; original and accompaniment versions	
October 14, 2024	SPILL THE FEELS: 1. "Eyes on You"; 2. "LOVE, MONEY, FAME (feat. DJ Khaled)"; 3. "1 to 13"; 4. "Candy"; 5. "Rain"; 6. "Water"	Seventeen	—	EP	Seventeen	All members	12th Mini Album	
October 18, 2024	LOVE, MONEY, FAME (Remixes): 1. "LOVE, MONEY, FAME (feat. DJ Khaled)"; 2. "LOVE, MONEY, FAME (English Ver.) (feat. DJ Khaled)"; 3. "LOVE, MONEY, FAME (Sped Up Ver.) (feat. DJ Khaled)"; 4. "LOVE, MONEY, FAME (Hitchhiker Remix) (feat. DJ Khaled)"; 5. "LOVE, MONEY, FAME (TAK Remix) (feat. DJ Khaled)"	Seventeen	—	Single	Seventeen	All members	Remix single	
November 1, 2024	"LOVE, MONEY, FAME (feat. DJ Khaled) (Timbaland Remix)"	Seventeen	—	Single	Seventeen	All members	Remix	
November 8, 2024	"LOVE, MONEY, FAME (feat. DJ Khaled) (Kenia OS Remix)"	Seventeen	—	Single	Seventeen	All members	Remix	
November 11, 2024	"Shohikigen"	Seventeen	Shohikigen	Single	Seventeen	All members	Pre-release single	
November 27, 2024	Shohikigen: 1. "Shohikigen"; 2. "Circles (Japanese ver.)" 3. "MAESTRO (Japanese ver.)"	Seventeen	—	Single	Seventeen	All members	Japan 4th Single	
December 4, 2024	STARDUST: 1. "54321 (Lift Off)" (feat. Vernon); 2. "Orbit" (feat. JinJiBeWater_隼); 3. "Cold Love"	The8	—	EP	Solo	The8, Vernon	1st EP China	
January 8, 2025	TELEPARTY: 1. "CBZ (Prime time)" 2. "Happy Alone"; 3. "Love Song"	BSS	—	Single album	Subunit	Hoshi, DK, Seungkwan	2nd Single Album	
January 13, 2025	"Worth It (值得)"	Jun	—	Single	Solo	Jun	—	
January 27, 2025	"Better Half (feat. Omoinotake)"	Jeonghan feat. Omoinotake	—	Single	Solo	Jeonghan	—	
January 29, 2025	"Better Half (feat. Jeonghan of Seventeen) -Japanese ver.-"	Omoinotake feat. Jeonghan	Pieces	Album track	As featured artist	Jeonghan	—	
February 1, 2025	"Somewhere in This Universe"	Seungkwan	When the Stars Gossip Original Soundtrack Pt. 4	Soundtrack single	Solo	Seungkwan	Original and instrumental versions	
March 10, 2025	BEAM: 1. "PINOCCHIO (feat. So!YoON!)"; 2. "96ers" 3. "STUPID IDIOT"	HxW	—	Single album	Subunit	Hoshi, Woozi	1st Single Album	
April 19, 2025	"Moon"	Astro with various artists	—	Single	As featured artist	Hoshi, Wonwoo, Mingyu, DK, Seungkwan	—	
April 24, 2025	"Good Day 2025 (Telepathy + By the Moonlight Window)"	Various artists, including BSS	—	Single	Collaboration	Hoshi, DK, Seungkwan	—	
May 3, 2025	"It's You"	Dokyeom	Resident Playbook, Pt. 7 (Original Soundtrack)	Soundtrack single	Solo	DK	Original and instrumental versions	
May 26, 2025	HAPPY BURSTDAY: 1. "HBD"; 2. "THUNDER"; 3. "Bad Influence (Prod. by Pharrell Williams)"; 4. "Skyfall"; 5. "Fortunate Change"; 6. "99.9%"; 7. "Raindrops"; 8. "Damage (feat. Timbaland)"; 9. "Shake It Off"; 10. "Happy Virus"; 11. "Destiny"; 12. "Shining Star"; 13. "Gemini"; 14. "Trigger"; 15. "Coincidence"; 16. "Jungle"	Seventeen	—	Studio album	Seventeen	All members	5th Album	
June 10, 2025	"ECHO! (Prod. WOOZI)"	HxW	WORLD OF STREET WOMAN FIGHTER (WSWF) Original, Vol. 2 (Class Mission)	Soundtrack album track	Subunit	Hoshi, Woozi	—	
June 30, 2025	"Til My Fingers Bleed"	Dino, Duckwrth & The Word Alive	—	Single	Collaboration	Dino	Esports World Cup 2025 official song	
July 14, 2025	"Where love passed"	Seventeen	—	Single	Seventeen	All members	First Love DOGs theme song	
July 17, 2025	"GOGAE"	Wonwoo	—	Single	Solo	Wonwoo	—	
July 25, 2025	"Love Is Gone (with JOSHUA of SEVENTEEN)"	Slander & Seventeen	—	Single	Collaboration	Joshua	2 tracks	
August 15, 2025	"Love Is Gone (with JOSHUA of SEVENTEEN and Dylan Matthew)"	Slander, Seventeen, Dylan Matthew & Joshua	—	Single	Collaboration	Joshua	3 tracks	
August 29, 2025 (Note: Released on Chinese streaming services on August 29, 2025, followed by a global release on August 30.)	"Star Crossing Night (feat. GALI)"	The8 feat. GALI	—	Single	Solo	The8	—	
September 16, 2025	"TAKE A SHOT"	Hoshi	—	Single	Solo	Hoshi	—	
September 29, 2025	HYPE VIBES: 1. "Fiesta"; 2. "5, 4, 3 (Pretty woman) (feat. Lay Bankz)"; 3. "Worth it" 4. "For you" 5. "Young again" 6. "Earth"	CxM	—	EP	Subunit	S.Coups, Mingyu	1st Mini Album	
October 10, 2025	"Illegal + SEVENTEEN"	PinkPantheress & Seventeen	Fancy Some More?	Album track	Collaboration	The8, Mingyu, Vernon	—	
October 24, 2025	"Bad Influence (Prod. by Pharrell Williams) (Explicit Ver.)"	Seventeen	HAPPY BURSTDAY	Album track	Seventeen	All except Jeonghan and Wonwoo (Note: Jeonghan and Wonwoo were fulfilling their mandatory military service at the time of the song's release.)	Explicit version; released digitally and on the LP edition	
November 7, 2025	"5, 4, 3 (Pretty woman) (feat. Flo Milli)"	CxM feat. Flo Milli	—	Single	Subunit	S.Coups, Mingyu	Alternate version of "5, 4, 3 (Pretty woman)" from Hype Vibes, featuring Flo Milli	
November 11, 2025	"Fallen Superstar"	Hoshi	—	Single	Solo	Hoshi	—	
December 8, 2025	"So Many Roads"	Lola James Harper & Joshua	—	Single	Collaboration	Joshua	—	
December 16, 2025	"焚月 (Fen Yue)"	Jun	—	Soundtrack single	Solo	Jun	The Vendetta of An soundtrack; original and two accompaniment versions	
January 12, 2026	Serenade: 1. "Rockstar"; 2. "Blue"; 3. "Guilty Pleasure"; 4. "Silence"; 5. "Dream Serenade"; 6. "Prelude of love"	DxS	—	EP	Subunit	DK, Seungkwan	1st Mini Album	
February 23, 2026	"Never Losing"	Dokyeom	Webtoon 'Return of the Blossoming Blade' Part. 5 (Original Soundtrack)	Soundtrack single	Solo	DK	Original and instrumental versions	
February 27, 2026	"Tiny Light"	Seventeen	BEASTARS FINAL SEASON Part 2	Soundtrack single	Seventeen	All except Jeonghan and Wonwoo (Note: Jeonghan and Wonwoo were serving their mandatory military service at the time of the song's release.)	Ending theme	
March 14, 2026	"Baby, Honey"	Hoshi	—	Single	Solo	Hoshi	—	
March 18, 2026	"Blooming(feat. Woozi)"	xion feat. Woozi	In Bloom : Gaehwa	EP track	As featured artist	Woozi	—	
March 22, 2026	"Best Scene" (명장면)	Dokyeom	Curtain Up, Class, Pt. 5 (Original Soundtrack)	Soundtrack single	Solo	DK	Original and instrumental versions	
April 1, 2026 (Note: Released on Chinese streaming services on April 1, 2026, followed by a global release on April 2.)	"四月的漂流 (April Drift)"	The8	—	Single	Solo	The8	—	
April 13, 2026	"Feel Me"	DxS	—	Single	Subunit	DK, Seungkwan	essential;studio project	
April 24, 2026	"Like Spring"	Gummy × Seungkwan	—	Single	Collaboration	Seungkwan	—	
May 1, 2026	"不见了 (Love is gone)"	The8	—	Single	Solo	The8	—	
May 29, 2026	"One More Dance"	Joshua & Corbyn Besson	K-POPS! (Music from and inspired by K-POPS! Motion Picture)	Soundtrack album track	Collaboration	Joshua	Track 12	
June 15, 2026	"SNAPBACK"	Hoshi	—	Single	Solo	Hoshi	—	
June 29, 2026	V8: 1. "Friend"; 2. "BEAT"; 3. "singasong" 4. "mia" 5. "coloring" 6. "girlsnboys" 7. "8DM"; 8. "rat race"	V8	—	EP	Subunit	The8, Vernon	1st Mini Album	
July 13, 2026	"Beyond the Dream"	Dino	Dream to You, Pt. 1 (Original Soundtrack)	Soundtrack single	Solo	Dino	Original and instrumental versions	
July 15, 2026	"Love Sick (narr. Lee Moon Sae)"	Picheolin	吉BOARD (Gilboard)	Single	Solo	Dino	Pre-release single	
July 17, 2026	Spring, Summer, Fall, Winter; Korean ver. Japanese ver.: 1. "Spring, Summer, Fall, Winter (Korean Ver.)"; 2. "Spring, Summer, Fall, Winter (Japanese Ver.)"	Wonwoo	—	Digital single album	Solo	Wonwoo	Korean and Japanese versions	
July 22, 2026	"Mi-cheo Mi-cheo"	Picheolin	吉BOARD (Gilboard)	Single	Solo	Dino	Pre-release single	
July 23, 2026	"耳朵 (Ear)"	Joshua	—	Single	Solo	Joshua	Cover of Li Ronghao's "耳朵"	
July 26, 2026	"Stay With Me"	Dokyeom	Spooky in Love, Pt. 2 (Original Soundtrack)	Soundtrack single	Solo	DK	Original and instrumental versions	
August 3, 2026	吉BOARD (Gilboard): 1. "ZZAN"; 2. "Party Rock Rock (prod. Hitchhiker)"; 3. "Sincerely (prod. Lee Hyun Do of DEUX)"; 4. "Mi-cheo Mi-cheo"; 5. "Love Sick (narr. Lee Moon Sae)"; 6. "For JEONG and LOVE"; 7. "LIKE IT"	Picheolin	—	EP	Solo	Dino	1st Mini Album	
August 10, 2026	"One - Spotify Singles"	DxS	—	Single	Subunit	DK, Seungkwan	Spotify exclusive	
August 20, 2026	"I'll Be Back"	Vernon	—	Single	Solo	Vernon	—	
September 22, 2026	Baby Come Home; Chinese ver. English ver.: 1. "Baby Come Home"; 2. "Baby Come Home (English Ver.)"	Joshua	—	Digital single album	Solo	Joshua	Chinese and English versions	
September 28, 2026	9: 1. "360 (Feat. Mabelz PiXXiE)"; 2. "月背"; 3. "I See You"; 4. "Dexire"; 5. "寻途 (Inward)"; 6. "4give" 7. "9"	Jun	—	EP	Solo	Jun	1st EP China	
October 10, 2026	"BOYFRIEND"	Hoshi	—	Single	Solo	Hoshi	—	

== See also ==
- Seventeen discography
- Seventeen videography
- List of Seventeen live performances
- List of songs written by Seventeen members
