= V8 (EP) =

- Digital cover

EP by V8
- Released: June 29, 2026
- Genres: Electronic; hyperpop; dance-pop
- Length: 22:19
- Languages: Korean; English; Mandarin Chinese
- Labels: Pledis; YG Plus
- Producer: Han Sung-soo

Singles from V8
- 1. "Singasong" Released: June 29, 2026

V8 is the debut eponymous extended play by V8, a sub-unit of the South Korean boy band Seventeen. It was released on June 29, 2026, by Pledis Entertainment through YG Plus alongside its lead single "Singasong".

== Background ==
On March 12, 2026, Pledis Entertainment announced that Seventeen members Vernon and The8 were preparing to debut as the group's sixth official sub-unit, with an initial target release scheduled for June. Both members were reported to be directly participating in the album's production. On May 28, Pledis Entertainment officially announced the subunit V8—a name combining Vernon and The8's stage names that symbolizes the accelerating driving force of a V8 engine—with their debut set for June 29.

On June 8, 2026, Pledis Entertainment announced that the duo's debut album is a self-titled EP and began its pre-order through online music retailers. Furthermore, V8 collaborated with a wide roster of global hitmakers and mainstream electronic, pop, and hip-hop producers. These included American musician Pharrell Williams—who previously worked with Seventeen on the song "Bad Influence" from their 2025 album Happy Burstday—and longtime collaborator Bumzu, alongside Dylan Brady of 100 Gecs, Alice Longyu Gao, Korean Music Awards winner Kirara, among others. On June 9, the duo released a teaser film titled "Peek at V8" across Hybe Labels' YouTube channel and Seventeen's official social media platforms.w The EP centers around the overarching theme of "spent youth" (소모된 청춘), capturing moments of wandering, confusion, and the subsequent recovery and growth experienced over time through a diverse palette of electronic music.

Promotional rollouts for the album included three distinct visual concepts released sequentially through mid-June. The first, titled "Rats Nest" and released on June 11, used the metaphor of a disorderly rat's nest to depict the chaotic trajectory of survival in youth, featuring raw aesthetics like broken cars and overgrown weeds set to an electronic track with pop sensibilities. By June 16, the duo announced that the EP would feature eight tracks, including the title track "Singasong". Vernon actively advocated for "Singasong" to serve as the project's focus track, noting that its refreshing and unconventional production stood out during the final stages of the writing process. The second version, "Check Out", was unveiled on June 18 and adopted a vintage, lighthearted aesthetic with a synthesizer-heavy soundscape, showcasing the members freely enjoying their current state. The final concept, "Rev", was introduced on June 22; named after increasing engine rotation speed, the version utilized a golden hour sunset and "electro trash" sounds to symbolize the energy of youth using uncertainty as fuel to move forward. Leading up to the release, snippets of the music were teased on the collaborating artists' social media channels, and a pre-listening event styled as a DJ party was held on June 28. On June 27, a music video teaser for "Singasong" was published on the Hybe Labels YouTube channel and the group's official social platforms.

The project developed over a 10-month recording period spanning Seoul, Los Angeles, and Berlin. Rather than initiating the album with a standard corporate creative brief, Vernon and The8 reversed the traditional production process by first establishing a community of artists they admired and compiling a "sonic moodboard" of niche DJ edits, remixes, and internet deep cuts before executing the songwriting. Producer Robb Roy noted that during production sessions—which continued during Seventeen's United States tour—the duo prioritized personal artistic excitement over commercial expectations, steering the sonic direction toward electronic dance music.

== Release and promotion ==
Prior to the album's release, V8 initiated a social media promotional campaign. On June 19, 2026, the duo uploaded a dance challenge video previewing a 30-second snippet of the title track "Singasong" to Seventeen's official Instagram account. The teaser previewed the song's hyperpop-based electronic production, which features heavy beats and electronic soundscapes. The promotional performance video was filmed outdoors on an asphalt backstreet alleyway rather than an indoor dance studio. Media outlets noted that the choreography contrasted the dance styles of the members, pairing The8's fluid movement with Vernon's hip-hop rhythm. The social media dance challenge received over 90 million views ahead of the EP's launch.

The day before V8's debut, the duo held a pre-listening party for the EP at Grain House in Itaewon, Seoul. Organized as a club-style DJ party rather than a conventional press showcase, the event featured live sets from the duo alongside several of the album's electronic music collaborators, including German DJ Mechatok and South Korean electronic musician Kirara. The lineup also featured DJ Pool and producer Joon Kwak, with corporate event backing from Budweiser. During the event, The8 performed a live turntable DJ set to preview the EP's tracks for attendees. The EP was officially released worldwide the following day on June 29.

Following the release, Pledis Entertainment announced the opening of a promotional pop-up store located at the Hybe headquarters in Seoul. Operating from July 4 to July 9, 2026, the retail space was designed around the theme of the EP and featured a large media wall broadcasting the music video for the lead single "Singasong". The pop-up also put original physical props used during the music video's production on public display, alongside dedicated listening stations and photography areas for visitors. the duo is scheduled to hold a concert series titled "2026 Vernon The8 [V8] Live". They will perform at KINTEX in Goyang, South Korea, on July 11 and 12, which marks the first time a Seventeen subunit concert will feature all-standing admission. This will be followed by a three-night run at AsiaWorld–Expo in Hong Kong from July 17 to 19, alongside a scheduled promotional showcase in mid-July.

== Composition ==
=== Themes and style ===
Sonically, V8 blends internet-bred hyperpop music elements with European electronic dance music (EDM) production, bloghouse, and alternative pop. Collaborating producers noted that while the duo did not personally operate the digital audio workstations, they acted as primary producers and A&Rs, controlling structural arrangements, vocal inflections, and mixing revisions. Thematic content across the EP centers on a concept of "spent youth", utilizing motifs of wandering, confusion, and resilience.

Vernon and The8 maintained creative control over the project, contributing to the lyrics and composition of six of the album's eight tracks. To construct the EP's soundscape, they collaborated with global alternative and underground music producers, many of whom were introduced to the project by experimental musician Alice Longyu Gao. Vernon noted that the duo deliberately sought out an organic approach to songwriting rather than relying on a calculated concept:

I don’t think authenticity is something you can calculate or artificially make... works that feel authentic are what reach out to me the most. They sound like, or look like, or feel like actual stories — what people actually go through.

— Vernon, Billboard

Regarding their extensive technical and creative involvement across the entire tracklist, The8 further explained:

We just do everything our way. We got involved in every part because we’re trying to do what we want, how we want. I think, because of that, more of who we are as people will be felt.

— The8, Billboard

=== Songs ===
The opening track, "Friend", was built from an initial phonetic vocal draft recorded by The8 over a top-line melody composed by Robb Roy. The track serves as a dedication to the group's fanbase, incorporating internal references to their career. Vernon's verse references the green-walled training studio from their pre-debut years, known colloquially as the "Melona studio", while The8's lyrics reference a memory of presenting yellow roses to fans at a music show broadcast. The track opens with an audio sample of a childhood interview The8 gave in China as the leader of a breakdancing crew, which Vernon sourced by personally requesting archival footage from fans on their online community platform. "Beat", arranged and coordinated by Alice Longyu Gao, integrates high-energy electronic and dance-pop elements suited for synchronized choreography. The lead single, "Singasong", is an upbeat, hyperpop-infused electronic track co-composed by German producer and DJ Mechatok. The collaboration began organically after Vernon shared Mechatok's music on his Instagram account, later finalizing the arrangement in person during Mechatok's tour stop in Seoul. The track features a rhythmic digital beat designed to accompany synchronized shuffle dancing, and retains Mechatok's name chanted in the final chorus, which was originally intended as a placeholder lyric during the initial demo phase. "Mia" (Korean: 미아; lit. 'lost child') is Vernon's solo track. Inspired structurally by Madeon's EDM remix of Blur's 1997 rock song "Song 2", the track was co-produced with South Korean electronic musician Kirara and Han Jung-in. Kirara engineered the track as an electronic punk song reminiscent of the late-2000s bloghouse movement, utilizing technical references from 2NE1's "Go Away" and The Black Eyed Peas' "I Gotta Feeling" to build an accompaniment driven by dense eighth-note rhythms and heavy sidechain effects.

"Coloring" (Korean: 컬러링) draws structural inspiration from Korean hip-hop ballads and utilizes the digital motif of a mobile ringback tone (known as a "caller ring" in South Korea). The track features Vernon performing the first verse in English and Korean, followed by a fluid, melodic rap delivered by The8 in Mandarin Chinese. "Girlsnboys" was co-written and produced by American musician Pharrell Williams alongside longtime Seventeen producer Bumzu. The track features an old-school synth-pop sound reminiscent of the production style of The Neptunes. Lyrically, the song addresses modern burnout and exhaustion felt by workers and students, utilizing a melodic singing-rap delivery by The8. The8's solo track, "8DM", is an electronic dance song inspired by his exposure to underground club culture during a visit to Berlin. Co-produced with Gao, DPR Cream, and DPR Artic, the song relies on natural and celestial imagery—referencing gravity and spinning worlds—mirroring structural themes from his 2024 solo single "Orbit." The digital-only bonus track, "Rat Race", acts as an uptempo party anthem addressing impostor syndrome and the commercial pressures of the music industry. Co-produced by Dylan Brady of 100 Gecs, the lyrics include structural metaphors regarding industry expendability, including a direct cultural reference to the film Mickey 17.

== Critical reception ==
The album received positive reviews from music critics, who noted its sonic contrast and departure from Seventeen's collective musical identity. Writing for Vogue Singapore, Emily Heng characterized the EP as a layered work that embeds emotional depth beneath an upbeat palette of electronica and trash pop. Heng highlighted the structural juxtaposition of heavy lyrical themes and lively instrumentation in "Girlsnboys", as well as the pop-punk-influenced vulnerability of Vernon's solo track "Mia". While describing The8's solo song "8DM" as an assertive club anthem, she noted that the track's fast pace minimized his melodic vocal delivery. Heng also praised the album's thematic sequencing, stating that opening with the childhood recording in "Friend" and closing with the industry critique in "Rat Race" created a narrative arch balancing hope and despair. In a review for Ize, Han Soo-jin commended the duo's choice to pivot toward non-mainstream musical styles over a conventional commercial formula. Han noted that while Seventeen's group discography generally treats youth as a shared journey of growth, V8 focuses on personal exhaustion and subsequent recovery. The publication highlighted the collaboration between established idols and alternative musicians as a significant experiment for the domestic South Korean market, where hyperpop remains a subgenre. Han praised the title track "Singasong" for its minimalist lyricism, which transforms word repetition into rhythmic texture. Additionally, she interpreted the song's demolition derby music video as an effective metaphor for youth, where vehicular collision and damage are recontextualized as symbols of vitality and momentum.

== Commercial performance ==
Following its release, V8 debuted at number one on the daily Hanteo Album Chart, selling a cumulative total of 559,904 copies by July 1, 2026. In China, the EP received a platinum certification from the digital music platform QQ Music for generating over 1 million yuan in sales revenue. Domestically, the lead single "Singasong" entered the Melon Top 100 chart at number 23 shortly after its digital release.

== Track listing ==
V8 track listing
No.	Title	Lyrics	Music	Arrangement	Length
1.	"Friend"	Vernon; The8; Robb Roy	Vernon; The8; Roy; Numbernine; Millennium; Kimj	Numbernine; Millennium	3:00
2.	"Beat"	Vernon; The8; Roy; Alice Longyu Gao	Vernon; The8; Roy; Gao; Ramzoid; Lucian; Sophie Cates		2:35
3.	"Singasong"	Vernon; The8; Roy	Vernon; The8; Roy; Mechatok		3:07
4.	"Mia" (미아; Vernon solo)	Vernon; The8; Roy; Han Jung-in	Vernon; The8; Roy; Han; Kirara	Kirara; Han	2:53
5.	"Coloring" (컬러링)	Vernon; The8; Roy	Vernon; The8; Roy; Numbernine; Badtree		3:18
6.	"Girlsnboys"	Vernon; The8; Pharrell Williams; Rudolph	Williams; Bumzu; Vernon; The8; Rudolph		2:39
7.	"8DM" (The8 solo)	The8; Gao	The8; Gao; UHD; Stella Smyth; DPR Cream; DPR Artic; Hakaseee		2:28
8.	"Rat Race"	Vernon; The8; Gao; Jake Torrey; Roy	Vernon; The8; Dylan Brady; Gao; Torrey; Roy; UHD; Will Not Fear; Rhode; Lodge Boy	Brady; UHD; Will Not Fear; Rhode; Lodge Boy	2:19
Total length:					22:19

Notes

- "Beat" is stylized in all caps
- "Singasong", "Mia", "Coloring", "Girlsnboys", and "Rat Race" are stylized in small letters

== Charts ==
=== Weekly charts ===
Weekly chart performance for V8
Chart (2026)	Peak position
Belgian Albums (Ultratop Flanders)	123
French Physical Albums (SNEP)	27
Greek Albums (IFPI)	14
Japanese Albums (Oricon)	6
Japanese Combined Albums (Oricon)	6
Japanese Hot Albums (Billboard Japan)	29
South Korean Albums (Circle)	1
US Billboard 200	128
US Top Dance Albums (Billboard)	4
US World Albums (Billboard)	3

=== Monthly charts ===
Monthly chart performance for V8
Chart (2026)	Peak position
South Korean Albums (Circle)	11

== Release history ==
Release history for V8
Region	Date	Format	Label	Ref.
Various	June 29, 2026	Digital download; streaming	Pledis; YG Plus	
South Korea	June 29, 2026	CD; Weverse album; Kit	Pledis; YG Plus	
