= Guinneissik =

South Korean electronic musician

- Born: Han Seokwoo
- Origin: Seoul, South Korea
- Genres: Electronic
- Years active: 2019–present
- Label: 6v6 Recordings

Han Seokwoo (Korean: 한석우), better known by his stage name Guinneissik (Korean: 기나이직) is a South Korean Electronic musician. He has released three albums: Listening and in Imperfect Peace (듣는음악과 평강하지 못한) (2020), Postwar (2021) and GIRL I LOVE YOU (2026).

== Career ==
Guinneissik started music by learning music from Kirara. He majored in classical music, and his stage name Guinneissik is said to have originated from the Korean word "Ginaesik" (Korean: 기내식, meaning in-flight meals). He released an EP chba in 2019. He released his first studio album Listening and in Imperfect Peace (듣는음악과 평강하지 못한) in 2020.

In 2021, he released his second studio album Postwar. Indiepost reviewed the album for cleverly borrowing his future bass style and the avant-garde elements of techno, while boldly transforming and developing it into his own way and narrative. In March 2023, he released the single Farewell Two Shell.

In 2026, he released his third studio album, GIRL I LOVE YOU.

== Discography ==
=== Studio albums ===
- Listening and in Imperfect Peace (듣는음악과 평강하지 못한) (2020)
- Postwar (2021)
- GIRL I LOVE YOU (2026)

=== EPs ===
- chBa (2019)

=== Remix albums ===
- Postwar Aftermath, In Their Eternal Silence (2022)
