= V8 (duo) =

South Korean musical duo

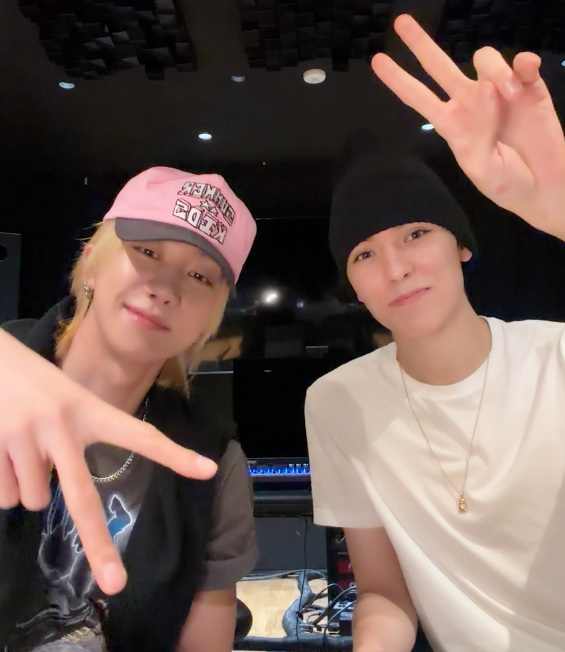
- V8 in 2026; The8 and Vernon

Background information
- Origin: Seoul, South Korea
- Genres: Electronic; hyperpop
- Years active: 2026–present
- Label: Pledis
- Spinoff of: Seventeen
- Members: The8; Vernon

V8 is the sixth sub-unit of South Korean boy band Seventeen, consisting of members Vernon and The8. Formed by Pledis Entertainment in 2026, the duo debuted on June 29, with their eponymous extended play (EP) V8.

The duo is characterized by an experimental sonic identity heavily rooted in electronic music, hyperpop, and multilingualism, with lyrics naturally written across English, Korean, and Mandarin Chinese. Noted for maintaining a high degree of creative control over their production, songwriting, and visual direction, they intentionally diverges from mainstream industry cycles through extensive collaborations with a diverse roster of global underground electronic and alternative producers, including Pharrell Williams, Mechatok, and Dylan Brady.

== History ==
On March 12, 2026, Pledis Entertainment announced that Seventeen members Vernon and The8 were preparing to debut as the group's sixth official subunit, with an initial target release scheduled for June. Both members were reported to be directly participating in the album's production. Prior to the unit's formation, Vernon had previously contributed to the songwriting and composition of "Orbit", the lead track from The8's 2024 Chinese solo album Stardust. The subunit's creation followed a period where Seventeen introduced multiple duo units—including JxW, HxW, CxM, and DxS—as various members began gradually fulfilling their mandatory military enlistment. The formation of the unit was originally proposed by The8, who envisioned creating a fresh musical style through a collaborative project before Vernon's military enlistment later that year. On May 28, Pledis Entertainment officially revealed the subunit's name as V8, a combination of "V" from Vernon and "8" from The8. The label stated that the name symbolizes a driving force moving forward with accelerated speed, akin to a V8 engine. Additionally, the debut date of the duo was confirmed to be on June 29.

On June 8, 2026, Pledis Entertainment announced that the duo's debut album is a self-titled EP. On June 16, they announced that the title track would be "Singasong". The track is a danceable, hyperpop-based Electronic song co-composed by V8 and German electro house producer and DJ Mechatok. Vernon actively advocated for "Singasong" to serve as the project's focus track, noting that its refreshing and unconventional production stood out during the final stages of the writing process.

For their overall debut project, the duo collaborated with a wide roster of global hitmakers and mainstream electronic, pop, and hip-hop producers. These included American musician Pharrell Williams—who previously worked with Seventeen on the song "Bad Influence" from their 2025 album Happy Burstday—and longtime collaborator Bumzu, alongside Dylan Brady of 100 Gecs, Alice Longyu Gao, Korean Music Awards winner Kirara, among others. On June 28, the day before the official release, the duo held a pre-listening party where the electronic music-driven tracklist was unveiled, featuring a DJ set by The8. Following the release, the duo is scheduled to hold a concert series titled "V8 Live". They will perform at KINTEX in Goyang, South Korea, on July 11 and 12, which marks the first time a Seventeen subunit concert will feature all-standing admission. This will be followed by a three-night run at AsiaWorld–Expo in Hong Kong from July 17 to 19, alongside a scheduled promotional showcase in mid-July.

== Artistry ==
V8's musical style is driven by electronic music, blending club-inspired textures with hyperpop elements. Seeking a distinct sound, the duo purposefully collaborated with global electronic producers outside the K-pop industry, drawing from subgenres like Berlin's underground scene and YEEDM. A defining characteristic of their music is multilingual lyricism featuring Korean, English, and Mandarin Chinese. Rather than a planned gimmick, this integration naturally reflects the members' respective backgrounds—utilizing The8's native Mandarin and Vernon's bicultural background—allowing them to write lyrics in whichever language feels most comfortable to sing and hear.

Lyrically, the duo focuses on autobiographical storytelling centered on the theme of youth, exploring narrative arcs of uncertainty, wandering, recovery, and personal growth. Their songs touch upon impostor syndrome and the pressures of commercial success; in the digital bonus track "Rat Race", Vernon explores guilt over industry success while The8 reflects on vulnerability beneath a public facade. Structurally, the duo intentionally counters modern trends like short, TikTok-optimized tracks by releasing an extensive eight-track format to diverge from current market cycles. Their songwriting also features "Easter eggs" for fans, such as the track "Friend," which references Seventeen's 2020 single "Home;Run", their green-walled trainee studio, and The8's sky photography.

The duo maintains a high degree of creative control over their production, visual direction, and A&R, often researching and contacting collaborators directly. While merging their distinct individual tastes served as a primary creative challenge, the members maintain a cooperative studio dynamic, resolving disagreements by deferring to whoever holds the stronger conviction on a track. Their hands-on approach includes Vernon actively participating in the technical mixing and arranging processes while touring, and The8 contributing conceptual ideas to shape the visual mood and momentum of their music videos based on his prior art film experience.

== Discography ==
=== Extended plays ===
List of extended plays, showing selected details, selected chart positions, and sales figures
Title	Details	Peak chart positions				Sales
Title	Details	KOR	JPN	US	US World	Sales
V8	Released: June 29, 2026; Label: Pledis; Formats: CD, digital download, streaming	1	6	128	3	KOR: 648,725; JPN: 21,518

=== Singles ===
List of singles, showing year released, selected chart positions, and name of the album
Title	Year	Peak chart position	Album
Title	Year	KOR	Album
"Singasong"	2026	48	V8

=== Other charted songs ===
List of other charted songs, showing year released, selected chart positions, and name of the album
Title	Year	Peak chart position	Album
Title	Year	KOR	Album
"8DM"	2026	81	V8

== Videography ==
=== Music videos ===
Title	Year	Director(s)	Ref.
"Singasong"	2026	Brthr	

== Live performances ==
=== V8 Live ===
Date	City	Country	Venue	Ref.
July 11, 2026	Goyang	South Korea	KINTEX	
July 12, 2026	Goyang	South Korea	KINTEX	
July 17, 2026	Hong Kong		AsiaWorld–Expo	
July 18, 2026	Hong Kong		AsiaWorld–Expo	
July 19, 2026	Hong Kong		AsiaWorld–Expo	
