= Postwar (album) =

Studio album by Guinneissik
- Released: 3 September 2021
- Genre: Electronic music
- Length: 42:29
- Label: Self-released

Guinneissik chronology
Listening and in Imperfect Peace (2020)	Postwar (2021)

Postwar is the second album by South Korean electronic musician Guinneissik. The album was released on 3 September 2021.

== Background ==
With his first studio album Listening and in Imperfect Peace in 2020, Guinneissik began to gain popularity, and he entered his second album recording. The composition of the album is based on the form of a symphony in the four movements, and he tried to contain the form of classical music without using classical musical instruments in the album.

== Critical reception ==
Web magazine Highjinkx reviewed "Postwar does not just take the arrangement or tone of classical music to replace parts of the electronic music genre frame, but rather dismantles and mixes the devices of classical and electronic music." Jeong Byeongwook of Indiepost described the album as "The work of a person who realises his concerns and answers between music in terms of enjoyment." Cho Jihwan of Tonplein said the album's track Ionisation as "The track takes models of already tangible styles and creates itself by tearing them out little by little, twisting them, mixing them up, and pasting them together."

== Track listing ==
No.	Title	Length
1.	"I. Sunjay "Prabhakar" Terrace"	10:34
2.	"II. Ionisation"	7:38
3.	"III. Flanderworks"	10:53
4.	"IV. Lophorina Superba"	13:24
