= Vernon (rapper) =

South Korean and American rapper (born 1998)

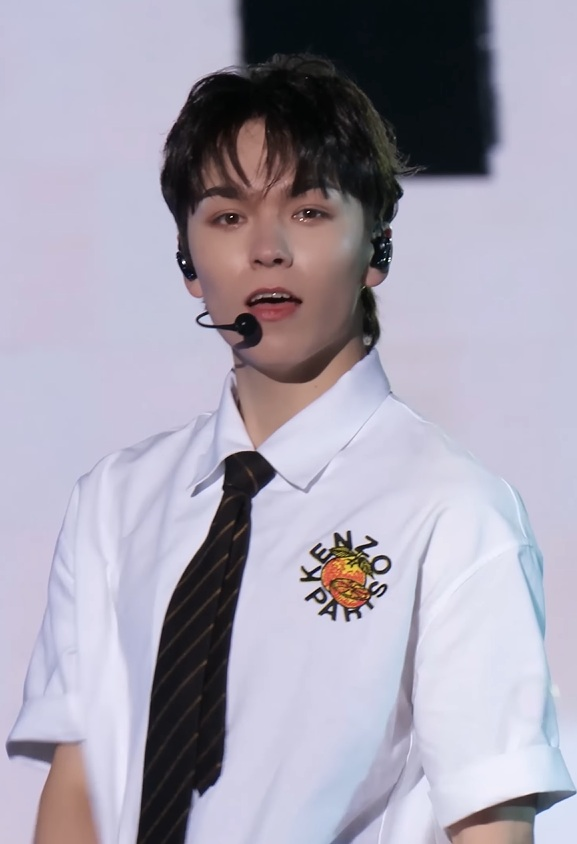
- Vernon in 2024
- Born: Hansol Vernon Chwe; February 18, 1998 (age 28); New York City, U.S.
- Citizenship: South Korea; United States
- Occupations: Rapper; singer; songwriter
- Musical career
- Genres: K-pop; hip-hop
- Instrument: Vocals
- Years active: 2015–present
- Label: Pledis
- Member of: Seventeen; V8

Korean name
- Hangul: 최한솔
- RR: Choe Hansol
- MR: Ch'oe Hansol

Hansol Vernon Chwe (Korean: 최한솔; born February 18, 1998), known mononymously as Vernon (버논), is a South Korean and American rapper, singer and songwriter. Managed by Pledis Entertainment, he is a member of the South Korean boy band Seventeen, its hip hop team, and the sub-unit V8.

Vernon made his official solo debut with "Black Eye" on December 27, 2022. Aside from his work with Seventeen and as a soloist, he has written and produced music with and for other artists such as Jamie, Bumzu, and Charli XCX.

== Early life ==
Hansol Vernon Chwe was born at Tisch Hospital in Kips Bay, Manhattan, New York City on February 18, 1998, to a Korean father and an American mother. At the age of five, he moved with his family to Hongdae, South Korea. He attended Changcheon Middle School but later opted for homeschooling with his parents after being scouted by Pledis, to focus on his training.

His stage name comes from his middle name, Vernon, which is also his mother's maiden name. Both his parents are artists.

== Career ==
=== 2012–2014: Pre-debut ===
Vernon joined Pledis Entertainment in 2012, after being scouted on the street, and received training for the next three years. Beginning in 2013, he participated in Seventeen TV, an online reality show that introduced Pledis' trainees and showed potential members of the boy group Seventeen before their official debut. The show was broadcast periodically on Ustream, where the trainees showed themselves training, singing, creating choreographies, and playing games. The online show also included participation in concerts, such as Like Seventeen.

Before his official debut as an idol, Vernon made multiple appearances on South Korean television, including Munhwa Broadcasting Corporation's Hello Stranger!, a program about foreigners in South Korea, and Song Eun-i's Eye to Eye, where he appeared as an elementary school student who was an expert in dating.

=== 2015–present: Seventeen, solo activities and sub-unit activities ===
In 2015, Vernon debuted as a member of the South Korean boy group Seventeen with the extended play 17 Carat on May 26, on which he contributed to lyrics for four out of the five songs. Since debuting, Vernon has participated in the songwriting of over 90 songs, making him the Seventeen member with the second-most writing credits after Woozi.

In August 2017, Vernon, alongside Pentagon's Kino, was introduced as a member of the musical collective M.O.L.A consisting of 15&'s Jamie, Uniq's Woodz, and producer Nathan. Guitarist Hoho later joined the collective.

In November 2021, Vernon released his first solo track since 2015, titled "Bands Boy", written by himself. In February 2022, English singer Charli XCX reached out to Vernon on Twitter to collaborate on a remix for "Beg for You". The remix was released February 26, 2022, with a review from Nylon's Steffanee Wang describing Vernon's verse as a "grand slam", with "heavy distortion before his silvery falsetto breaks through the digital veil".

In December 2022 it was announced that Vernon would release the third mixtape for Seventeen's The Thirteen Tapes series: a self-composed and self-written single titled "Black Eye". It was released on December 23, 2022.

In July 2023, Vernon, alongside bandmate Joshua, hosted an Apple Music 1 summer themed radio show titled Summer Vacation With Joshua and Vernon of Seventeen. He later joined Blink-182's Mark Hoppus' own Apple Music show After School Radio for episode 169. In 2024, Vernon was promoted to a regular member of the Korean Music Copyright Association (KOMCA). Later that year he was confirmed to have a cameo appearance in Anderson .Paak's comedy film K-Pops!.

In June 2026, Vernon and The8 debuted as V8, Seventeen's sixth sub-unit, with their self-titled debut EP V8 on June 29. The eight-track EP included the lead single "singasong", which Vernon and The8 co-composed with Mechatok, and Vernon's solo track "mia", created in collaboration with electronic musician KIRARA and Han Jung In.

== Artistry and image ==
=== Influences and musical style ===
Vernon has cited many influences throughout his career. Key punk rock influences include American band Green Day and Canadian singer Avril Lavigne, which have manifested in songs he has produced, such as Seventeen's "2 Minus 1" and his own "Black Eye". He has also indicated interest in hyperpop and experimental pop, many times crediting British singer Charli XCX as an influence, specifically for Seventeen's track "Gam3 Bo1". He has also indicated he is a fan of Bladee, 100 gecs, and The Kid Laroi.

=== Fashion ===
In 2023, Vernon was announced as the first global ambassador for French fashion house Kenzo. Since the announcement, Vernon has attended multiple shows for the brand at Paris Fashion Week and was the face of the brand's FW23 campaign.

== Personal life ==
Vernon holds dual South Korean and American citizenship.

=== Military service ===
On August 20, 2026, Vernon began his mandatory military service, entering a training center to receive basic military training, after which he will serve as a social service worker. His service is scheduled to conclude on May 19, 2028.

== Discography ==
=== Singles and collaborations ===
==== As lead artist ====
Title	Year	Peak chart positions	Sales	Album
Title	Year	KOR	Sales	Album
"Lotto" featuring Don Mills	2015	—	—	Non-album singles
"Q&A" with Ailee, S.Coups and Woozi	2015	58	KOR: 91,343	Non-album singles
"Bands Boy"	2021	—	—	Non-album singles
"Black Eye"	2022	—	—	Non-album singles
"—" denotes releases that did not chart or were not released in that region.

==== As featuring artist ====
Title	Year	Peak chart positions		Album
Title	Year	KOR Down.	CHN	Album
"Bucket List" Bumzu featuring Vernon	2015	—	—	Good Life
"Bumaye" (Remix) Drunken Tiger featuring Bizzy and Vernon	2018	—	—	Drunken Tiger X: Rebirth of Tiger JK
"Beg for You" (A. G. Cook and Vernon Remix) Charli XCX featuring Rina Sawayama	2022	—	—	Non-album single
"Wrecker" Omega Sapien featuring Vernon	2022	—	—	Wuga
"Miss You" (Sic)boy featuring Vernon and KM	2023	—	—	Hollow
"54321 (Lift Off)" The8 featuring Vernon	2024	64	23	Stardust
"—" denotes releases that did not chart or were not released in that region.

=== Other charted songs ===
Title	Year	Peak chart positions	Album
Title	Year	KOR	Album
"Shining Star" (Note: Credited under Seventeen but is a solo track performed by Vernon.)	2025	109	Happy Burstday

=== Soundtrack appearances ===
Title	Year	Peak chart positions	Album
Title	Year	KOR	Album
"Sickness" (병) featuring Eunwoo of Pristin	2016	—	Love Revolution OST
"A-Teen" with Joshua, Hoshi, Woozi, and Dino	2018	17	A-Teen OST
"Warrior" (逆燃) with Joshua, Jun, The8, and Mingyu	2021	—	Falling Into Your Smile OST
"—" denotes releases that did not chart or were not released in that region.

=== Composition credits ===
All credits are adapted from the Korea Music Copyright Association unless stated otherwise.

Year	Artist	Song	Album	Lyrics		Music	
Year	Artist	Song	Album	Credited	With	Credited	With
2015	Seventeen	"Shining Diamond"	17 Carat	Yes	Kim Min-jeong, S.Coups, Woozi	No	—N/a
2015	Seventeen	"Adore U"	17 Carat	Yes	Bumzu, S.Coups, Woozi	No	—N/a
2015	Seventeen	"Ah Yeah"	17 Carat	Yes	S.Coups, Woozi, Wonwoo, Mingyu	No	—N/a
2015	Seventeen	"Jam Jam"	17 Carat	Yes	Woozi, Dino, Hoshi	No	—N/a
2015	Vernon	"Lotto"	Non-album single	Yes	Don Mills	No	—N/a
2015	Bumzu	"Bucket List"	Good Life	Yes	Bumzu	No	—N/a
2015	Seventeen	"Fronting"	Boys Be	Yes	S.Coups, Woozi, Wonwoo, Mingyu	No	—N/a
2015	Seventeen	"Mansae"	Boys Be	Yes	Bumzu, S.Coups, Woozi, Wonwoo, Mingyu	No	—N/a
2015	Seventeen	"Rock"	Boys Be	Yes	S.Coups, Woozi, Wonwoo	No	—N/a
2015	Seventeen and Ailee	"Q And A"	Non-album singles	Yes	S.Coups, Woozi	No	—N/a
2015	Vernon	"Sickness" (Feat. Pledis Girls)	Non-album singles	Yes	—	No	—N/a
2015	Seventeen	"Chuck"	Love & Letter	Yes	S.Coups, Woozi, Wonwoo, Dino, Mingyu	No	—N/a
2015	Seventeen	"Still Lonely"	Love & Letter	Yes	Woozi, Wonwoo, Hoshi, Seungkwan	No	—N/a
2015	Seventeen	"Pretty U"	Love & Letter	Yes	Bumzu, S.Coups, Woozi, Seungkwan	No	—N/a
2015	Seventeen	"Hit Song"	Love & Letter	Yes	Bumzu, S.Coups, Dino, Mingyu	No	—N/a
2015	Seventeen	"Adore U" (Vocal Team)	Love & Letter	Yes	Bumzu, S.Coups, Woozi, DK, Seungkwan	No	—N/a
2015	Seventeen	"Monday to Saturday" (Hip Hop Team)	Love & Letter	Yes	Bumzu, S.Coups, Woozi, Wonwoo, Mingyu	Yes	Bumzu, S.Coups, Woozi
2015	Seventeen	"Shining Diamond" (Performance Team)	Love & Letter	Yes	Kim Min-jeong, S.Coups, Woozi	No	—N/a
2015	Seventeen	"Love Letter"	Love & Letter	Yes	S.Coups, Woozi, Wonwoo, Mingyu	No	—N/a
2016	Seventeen	"No F.U.N"	Love & Letter - Repackage Album	Yes	S.Coups, Woozi, Wonwoo, Dino, Hoshi, Seungkwan	No	—N/a
2016	Seventeen	"Very Nice"	Love & Letter - Repackage Album	Yes	Bumzu, S.Coups, Wonwoo, Mingyu	No	—N/a
2016	Seventeen	"Healing"	Love & Letter - Repackage Album	Yes	S.Coups, Woozi, Dino, Mingyu	No	—N/a
2016	Seventeen	"Space"	Love & Letter - Repackage Album	Yes	Bumzu, S.Coups, Wonwoo, Mingyu	No	—N/a
2016	Seventeen	"Boom Boom"	Going Seventeen	Yes	Bumzu, S.Coups, Woozi, Wonwoo, Mingyu	No	—N/a
2016	Seventeen	"Lean On Me"	Going Seventeen	Yes	Bumzu, S.Coups, Wonwoo, Mingyu	No	—N/a
2016	Seventeen	"Fast Pace"	Going Seventeen	Yes	S.Coups, Woozi, Hoshi	No	—N/a
2016	Seventeen	"I Don't Know"	Going Seventeen	Yes	S.Coups, Woozi	No	—N/a
2017	Seventeen	"If I" (Hip Hop Team)	Al1	Yes	S.Coups, Mingyu	No	—N/a
2017	Seventeen	"Crazy in Love"	Al1	Yes	Bumzu, S.Coups, Woozi, Mingyu	No	—N/a
2017	Seventeen	"Check In" (Remastering) (Hip Hop Team)	Al1	Yes	S.Coups, Wonwoo, Mingyu	No	—N/a
2017	Seventeen	"Swimming Fool"	Al1	Yes	Bumzu, Woozi, Dino	No	—N/a
2017	Seventeen	"Without You"	Teen, Age	Yes	Bumzu, S.Coups, Woozi, Dino, Hoshi, Mingyu, DK, The8, Jeonghan	No	—N/a
2017	Seventeen	"Trauma" (Hip Hop Team)	Teen, Age	Yes	S.Coups, Wonwoo, Mingyu	Yes	Bumzu
2017	Seventeen	"Campfire"	Teen, Age	Yes	Bumzu, S.Coups, Woozi, Wonwoo, Mingyu, DK, Seungkwan, The8, Jeonghan	No	—N/a
2017	Seventeen	"Rocket"	Teen, Age	Yes	Woozi, Nathan, Joshua	Yes	Bumzu, Woozi, Nathan
2017	Seventeen	"Bring It"	Teen, Age	Yes	Woozi, Hoshi	No	—N/a
2018	Seventeen	"Thinkin' About You"	Director's Cut	Yes	Bumzu, S.Coups, Woozi, Wonwoo	No	—N/a
2018	Seventeen	"MMO" (Hip Hop Team)	Non-album singles	Yes	S.Coups, Wonwoo, Mingyu	No	—N/a
2018	Seventeen	"Joker" (Hip Hop Team)	Non-album singles	Yes	S.Coups, Wonwoo, Mingyu	No	—N/a
2018	Seventeen	"Un Haeng Il Chi" (언행일치 / 言行一致) (Hip Hop Team)	Non-album singles	Yes	Bumzu, S.Coups, Wonwoo, Mingyu	No	—N/a
2018	Seventeen	"What's the Problem" (Hip Hop Team)	Non-album singles	Yes	S.Coups, Wonwoo, Mingyu	No	—N/a
2018	Seventeen	"Oh My!"	You Make My Day	Yes	Bumzu, S.Coups, Woozi	No	—N/a
2018	Seventeen	"Holiday"	You Make My Day	Yes	Woozi, Bumzu, Vernon	Yes	Woozi, Bumzu, Park Ki-tae
2018	Seventeen	"What's Good" (Hip Hop Team)	You Make My Day	Yes	S.Coups, Wonwoo, Mingyu	No	—N/a
2018	Seventeen	"Our Dawn is Hotter than Day"	You Make My Day	Yes	Bumzu, S.Coups, Woozi, Wonwoo, Mingyu	No	—N/a
2018	Seventeen	"A-Teen"	A-Teen OST Part 3	Yes	Bumzu, Woozi, Dino	No	—N/a
2018	Jimin Park	"PUTP" (전화받아) (feat. Kino, Woodz, Nathan)	jiminxjamie	Yes	Woodz, Nathan, Kino, Jimin Park	Yes	Woodz, Nathan, Kino, Park Jimin
2018	Drunken Tiger	"Bumaye" (Remix) (feat. Bizzy, Vernon of Seventeen)	Drunken Tiger X : Rebirth Of Tiger JK	Yes	Bumzu, Woozi, Dino	No	—N/a
2018	Seventeen	"Chilli" (Hip Hop Team)	You Made My Dawn	Yes	S.Coups, Wonwoo, Mingyu	Yes	Bumzu, Pop Time
2018	Seventeen	"Getting Closer"	You Made My Dawn	Yes	Bumzu, S.Coups, Woozi	No	—N/a
2019	Tobi Lou	"Looped Up" (feat. Vernon)	Live on Ice	Yes	TBD	Yes	TBD
2019	Seventeen	"Hit"	An Ode	Yes	Bumzu, Woozi	No	—N/a
2019	Seventeen	"Lie Again"	An Ode	Yes	Woozi, Bumzu, Vernon, Mingyu	No	—N/a
2019	Seventeen	"독: Fear"	An Ode	Yes	Woozi, Bumzu, Vernon	No	—N/a
2019	Seventeen	"Let Me Hear You Say"	An Ode	Yes	Woozi, Bumzu, Vernon, Mingyu	No	—N/a
2019	Seventeen	"Second Life"	An Ode	No	—N/a	Yes	Bumzu, Woozi
2019	Seventeen	"Network Love"	An Ode	Yes	Bumzu, Woozi, The8	No	—N/a
2019	Seventeen	"Back It Up" (Hip Hop Team)	An Ode	Yes	S.Coups, Wonwoo, Mingyu	No	—N/a
2019	Seventeen	"Lucky"	An Ode	Yes	Woozi, Bumzu, Vernon, Mingyu, Seungkwan	No	—N/a
2019	Seventeen	"Snap Shoot"	An Ode	Yes	Woozi, Bumzu, Vernon, Mingyu	No	—N/a
2020	Seventeen	"Fearless"	Heng:garæ	Yes	Bumzu, Woozi	No	—N/a
2020	Seventeen	"Left and Right"	Heng:garæ	Yes	Bumzu, Woozi	No	—N/a
2020	Seventeen	"My My"	Heng:garæ	Yes	Bumzu, S.Coups, Woozi	Yes	Bumzu, Woozi
2020	Seventeen	"Kidult"	Heng:garæ	Yes	Bumzu, S.Coups, Woozi	No	—N/a
2020	Seventeen	"Home;Run"	Semicolon	Yes	Bumzu, Woozi, Seungkwan	No	—N/a
2020	Seventeen	"Do Re Mi" (Seungkwan, Vernon and Dino)	Semicolon	Yes	Bumzu, Woozi, Dino, Seungkwan	No	—N/a
2020	Seventeen	"All My Love"	Semicolon	Yes	Bumzu, Woozi, Seungkwan	No	—N/a
2021	Seventeen	"Gam3 Bo1" (Hip Hop Team)	Your Choice	Yes	Bumzu, S.Coups, Woozi, Wonwoo, Mingyu	No	—N/a
2021	Seventeen	"Rock With You"	Attacca	Yes	Bumzu, Kim In-hyeong, Woozi, Joshua, Tim Tan, Jordan Witzigreuter, Cameron Walker-Wright	No	—N/a
2021	Seventeen	"Crush"	Attacca	Yes	Bumzu, Woozi, Maggiani Aris Andreas, Hoveyda Analise Nika	No	—N/a
2021	Seventeen	"I can't run away" (Hip Hop Team)	Attacca	Yes	Bumzu, S.Coups, Woozi, Wonwoo, Mingyu	Yes	Bumzu, Woozi, S.Coups, Wonwoo, Mingyu, Lee Min-gyu
2021	Seventeen	"2 Minus 1"	Attacca	Yes	Bumzu, Joshua	Yes	Bumzu, Woozi, Joshua, Heyfarmer
2021	Vernon	"Bands Boy"	Non-album singles	Yes	—	Yes	Cribs 1, Cribs 2
2022	Charli XCX	"Beg for You" (A. G. Cook and Vernon of Seventeen Remix) (feat Rina Sawayama)	Non-album singles	Yes	Charlotte Aitchison, Rina Sawayama, Roland Spreckley, Nicholas Gale, Sorana Păcurar, Alexander Soifer, Jonas von der Burg, Niclas von der Burg, Anoo Bhagavan, Bumzu	Yes	Charlotte Aitchison, Rina Sawayama, Roland Spreckley, Nicholas Gale, Sorana Păcurar, Alexander Soifer, Jonas von der Burg, Niclas von der Burg, Anoo Bhagavan, Bumzu
2022	Omega Sapien	"Wrecker"	Wuga	Yes	Omega Sapien, Rodrigues Harry	Yes	Omega Sapien, Rodrigues Harry
2022	Seventeen	"Ash"	Face the Sun	Yes	Bumzu, Woozi, Woo Chang-seong, Lee Nicholas David, Palmer Kyan	Yes	Bumzu, Woozi, Woo Chang-seong, Lee Nicholas David, Palmer Kyan
2022	Seventeen	"_World"	Sector 17	Yes	Bumzu, S.Coups, Woozi, Melanie Joy Fontana, Michel "Lindgren" Schulz	No	—N/a
2022	Seventeen	"Cheers" (Seventeen Leaders)	Sector 17	Yes	Bumzu, S.Coups, Woozi, Hoshi	Yes	Bumzu, Woozi, Mingyu
2022	Vernon	"Black Eye"	Non-album single	Yes	Robb Roy	Yes	Ohway!, Robb Roy, Hong Hoon-ki
2023	Seventeen	"Super"	FML	Yes	Bumzu, S.Coups, Woozi	No	—N/a
2023	Seventeen	"Fire" (Hip Hop Team)	FML	Yes	Bumzu, S.Coups, Woozi, Wonwoo, Mingyu	Yes	Bumzu, Wonwoo
2023	(sic)boy	"Miss You" (feat. KM, Vernon)	Hollow	Yes	Robb Roy, (sic)boy	Yes	Robb Roy, KM, (sic)boy
2023	Seventeen	"God of Music"	Seventeenth Heaven	Yes	Bumzu, S.Coups, Woozi, Mingyu	No	—N/a
2023	Seventeen	"Diamond Days"	Seventeenth Heaven	Yes	Bumzu, Jeon Gan-dhi, S.Coups, Woozi	No	—N/a
2023	Seventeen	"Monster" (Hip Hop Team)	Seventeenth Heaven	Yes	Bumzu, S.Coups, Woozi, Wonwoo, Mingyu	Yes	Bumzu
2023	Seventeen	"God of Light Music"	Non-album single	Yes	Bumzu, S.Coups, Woozi, Mingyu, Jun	No	—N/a
2024	Seventeen	"Lalali" (Hip Hop Team)	17 Is Right Here	Yes	Woozi, Bumzu, Wonwoo, Mingyu, Vernon	No	—N/a
2024	Seventeen	"Eyes on You"	Spill the Feels	Yes	Woozi, Bumzu, S.Coups	No	—N/a
2024	Seventeen	"Love, Money, Fame" (featuring DJ Khaled)	Spill the Feels	Yes	Woozi, Bumzu, Robb Roy	No	—N/a
2024	Seventeen	"Water" (Hip Hop Team)	Spill the Feels	Yes	Woozi, Bumzu, Wonwoo, Mingyu, S.Coups	Yes	Bumzu, Mingyu
2024	The8	"54321 (Lift Off)" (featuring Vernon)	Stardust	Yes	The8, Robb Roy	Yes	The8, Numbernine, Robb Roy, NicolKeem
2024	The8	"Orbit" (featuring JinJiBeWater)	Stardust	Yes	The8, Robb Roy, JinJiBeWater	Yes	Numbernine, Robb Roy, NicolKeem
2024	Yugyeom	"Sweet Like"	Non-album single	Yes	Robb Roy	No	—N/a
2025	Seventeen	"Skyfall"	Happy Burstday	Yes	The8, Robb Roy	No	—N/a
2025	Seventeen	"Shining Star"	Happy Burstday	Yes	Robb Roy	No	—N/a
2025	Yugyeom	"Glue Stick" (featuring Hoody)	Interlunar	Yes	Yugyeom, Robb Roy	Yes	Yugyeom, Robb Roy, DJ Wegun

== Filmography ==
=== Films ===
Year	Title	Role	Notes	Ref.
2024	K-Pops!	Himself	Cameo	

=== TV shows ===
Year	Title	Role	Ref.
2011	Eye to Eye	Cast member	
2014–2015	Hello Stranger!	Cast member	
2015	Show Me the Money 4	Contestant	
2018	Happy Together 3	Guest	
2018	Visiting Tutor	Guest (with Dino)	

=== Web shows ===
Year	Title	Role	Ref.
2013–2014	Seventeen TV	Cast member	
