= Thunder (Seventeen song) =

Single by Seventeen

from the album Happy Burstday
- Language: Korean
- Released: May 26, 2025
- Genre: K-pop; EDM; house-pop; dance-pop
- Length: 2:44
- Label: Pledis
- Songwriters: Woozi; Bumzu
- Producers: Woozi; Bumzu; S.Coups

Seventeen singles chronology
| "Shohikigen" (2024) | "Thunder" (2025) |

Music video
- "Thunder" on YouTube

"Thunder" is a song recorded by South Korean boy band Seventeen. It was released on May 26, 2025, as the lead single for the band's fifth studio album, Happy Burstday. "Thunder" achieved success, debuting atop South Korea's Circle Digital Chart and receiving eight wins on South Korean music programs alongside the 2025 MAMA Award for Best Dance Performance by a male group.

== Background and release ==
On March 24, 2025, Pledis Entertainment announced that Seventeen would be releasing a studio album in celebration of Seventeen's tenth anniversary in May that year. On April 21, Happy Burstday was announced. The title of the album's lead single, "Thunder", was revealed alongside the album's entire track list on May 13. The first snippet of the song was released on May 16 when Seventeen released a highlight medley for the entire album. The song was released alongside Happy Burstday on May 26.

== Composition and lyrics ==
"Thunder" has been described to be an EDM, house-pop, and dance-pop track. Its lyrics were written by Woozi with regular collaborator Bumzu. The pair composed the song with Seventeen's leader, S.Coups. "Thunder" was written in the key of G minor with a tempo of 130 beats per minute.

== Music video ==
The music video was directed by Samson of HighQualityFish. Two teasers were released, on May 23 and 24, and the video was released on May 26, alongside the song and album. The video features the members of Seventeen dancing at a club, celebrating their "rebirth" on their tenth anniversary.

== Live performances ==
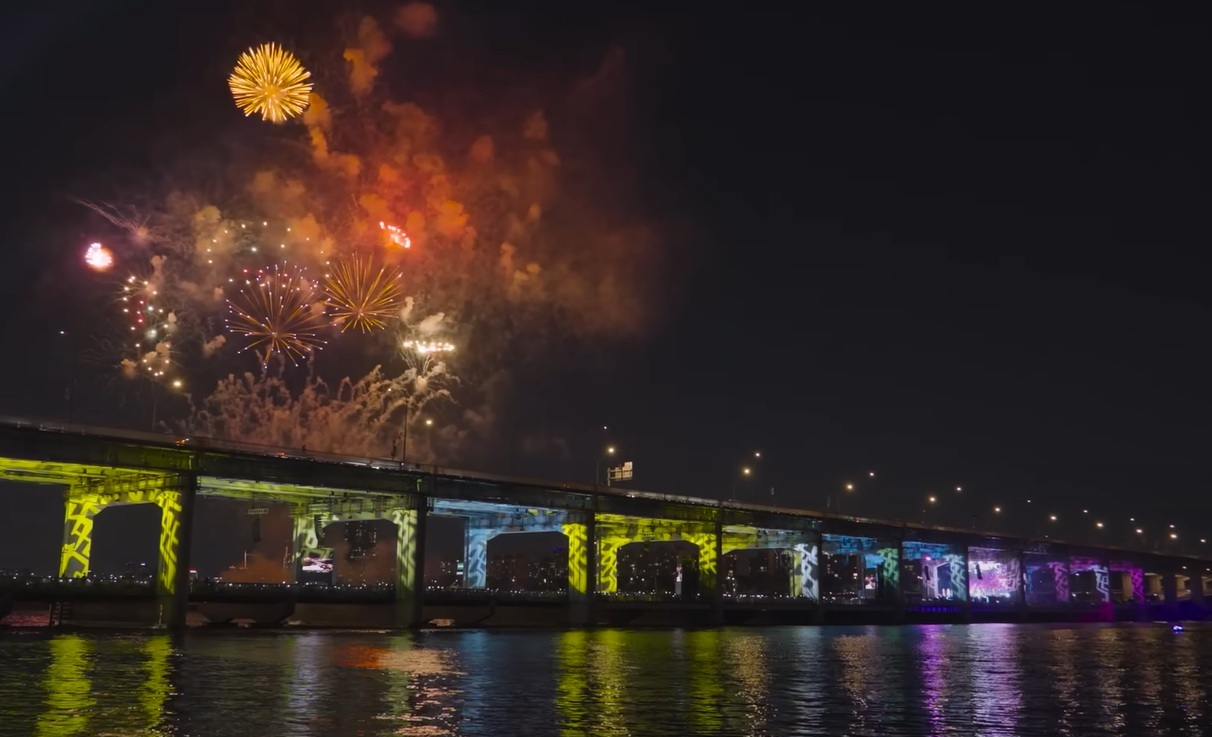
The first performance of "Thunder" was on Jamsu Bridge, a pedestrian bridge underneath the Banpo Bridge.

"Thunder" was first performed live on the Jamsu Bridge in Seoul on May 25, a day before its official release. The performance was the culmination of a three day "B-Day Party" event, drawing a crowd of approximately 60,000 people for the performance, as well as 350,000 overall. Tickets for 6,000 seats on the bridge during the performance were raffled off to fans; other fans who were unsuccessful in obtaining tickets chartered yachts to watch the concert.

Following the song's release, Seventeen went on various South Korean music programs to perform "Thunder". The first performance was at M Countdown on May 29, followed by Music Bank on May 30, Show! Music Core on May 31, and Inkigayo on June 1.

== Critical reception ==
In an album review for Happy Burstday, Gladys Yeo of NME positively described "Thunder" as a "club-ready banger that dives headfirst into the carefree nostalgia of late-noughties EDM and house-led pop music". Clash's Isadora Wandermurem praised the song for its "flawless production", deeming it "worthy of the biggest summer festivals". Writing for Billboard, Jeff Benjamin ranked "Thunder" as the best track of its album, highlighting the track's production and "undeniable" whistle hook.

== Accolades ==
On South Korean music programs, "Thunder" achieved eight first-place wins. At the 2025 MAMA Awards, it won Best Dance Performance for a male group.

Music program awards for "Thunder"
| Program | Date | Ref. |
|---|---|---|
| Inkigayo | June 8, 2025 | |
| M Countdown | June 5, 2025 | |
| M Countdown | June 19, 2025 | |
| Music Bank | June 6, 2025 | |
| Show Champion | June 4, 2025 | |
| Show Champion | June 11, 2025 | |
| Show! Music Core | June 7, 2025 | |
| Show! Music Core | June 14, 2025 | |

== Credits and personnel ==
Credits adapted from the Happy Burstday lyric book.

Location

- Recorded at Universe Factory and Prismfilter Studio
- Edited at Prismfilter Studio
- Mixed at Prismfilter Mix Lab
- Mastered at 821 Sound Mastering

Credits and personnel

- Woozi – lyrics, composition, chorus
- Bumzu – lyrics, composition, arrangement, chorus, drums, percussion, synthesizer, recording
- S.Coups – lyrics
- Seungkwan – chorus
- Dino – chorus
- Glenn – recording
- Nmore – digital editing
- Anchor – mixing
- Kwan Nam-woo – mastering

== Charts ==
=== Weekly charts ===
Weekly chart performance for "Thunder"
| Chart (2025) | Peak position |
|---|---|
| Global 200 (Billboard) | 41 |
| Hong Kong (Billboard) | 8 |
| Japan (Japan Hot 100) | 12 |
| Japan Combined Singles (Oricon) | 19 |
| Malaysia (IFPI) | 20 |
| New Zealand Hot Singles (RMNZ) | 18 |
| Philippines (Philippines Hot 100) | 36 |
| Singapore (RIAS) | 9 |
| South Korea (Circle) | 1 |
| Taiwan (Billboard) | 2 |
| UK Singles Sales (OCC) | 16 |
| US World Digital Song Sales (Billboard) | 8 |
| Vietnam (Vietnam Hot 100) | 99 |

=== Monthly charts ===
Monthly chart performance for "Thunder"
| Chart (2025) | Position |
|---|---|
| South Korea (Circle) | 10 |

=== Year-end charts ===
Year-end chart performance for "Thunder"
| Chart (2025) | Position |
|---|---|
| South Korea (Circle) | 103 |

== Release history ==
Release history for "Thunder"
| Region | Date | Format | Label | Ref. |
|---|---|---|---|---|
| Various | May 26, 2025 | Digital download; streaming | Pledis | |
