= Moves (Kirara album) =

Studio album by Kirara
- Released: 16 February 2016
- Genre: Big beat, electronic
- Length: 50:47
- Label: Mirrorball
- Producer: Kirara

Kirara chronology
rcts (2014)	Moves (2016)	Sarah (2018)

Moves is the second studio album by South Korean electronic musician Kirara. The album was released on 16 February 2016. It won best dance & electronic album at the 2017 Korean Music Awards.

== Background ==
Prior to the release of the album, Kirara released many eps called the ct series. The album was released two years after Kirara's debut studio album rcts and she said that she originally intended to name the album rcts 2. With the exception of the self-titled opening track, the tracks on the album are all named after moves from Pokémon.

== Critical reception ==
Park Joonwoo of Weiv said "Moves is an album that clearly shows the identity of "Kirara," and its identity is directly linked to what she has presented so far and what she has talked about." One selection committee member for the 2017 Korean Music Awards, Jung Goowon, described the album as "The aesthetics of repetition and the thrill of variation. The joy of electronic music is condensed into these two essential elements. And Kirara's Moves is a feast of sound from a musician who understands the two best."

== Track listing ==
No.	Title	Length
1.	"Kirara"	0:07
2.	"Revenge"	4:37
3.	"Blizzard"	5:40
4.	"Featherdance"	5:33
5.	"Fissure"	5:31
6.	"Thunderbolt"	5:38
7.	"Swords Dance"	5:19
8.	"Sleep Talk"	5:05
9.	"Avalanche"	6:40
10.	"Hail"	6:37
Total length:		50:47
