= The8 =

South Korean-based Chinese singer (born 1997)

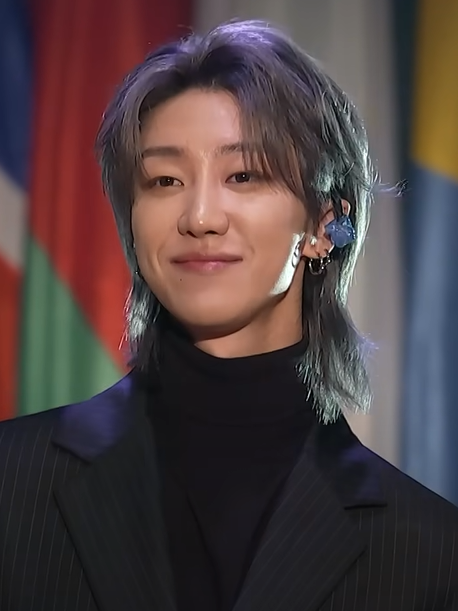
- The8 in 2023
- Born: Xu Minghao; November 7, 1997 (age 29); Anshan, Liaoning, China
- Occupations: Singer; dancer
- Musical career
- Genres: K-pop; Mandopop
- Instruments: Vocals
- Years active: 2015–present
- Label: Pledis
- Member of: Seventeen; V8

Chinese name
- Traditional Chinese: 徐明浩
- Simplified Chinese: 徐明浩
- Hanyu Pinyin: Xú Mínghào

Korean name
- Hangul: 서명호
- RR: Seo Myeongho
- MR: Sŏ Myŏngho

Xu Minghao (Chinese: 徐明浩; Korean: 서명호; born November 7, 1997), known professionally as The8 (디에잇; also stylized as The 8), is a Chinese singer and dancer based in South Korea. Managed by Pledis Entertainment, he is a member of the South Korean boy band Seventeen, its performance team, and the sub-unit V8.

In 2018, he had his official solo debut with the release of "Night and Rain" and served as one of the two dance mentors in the Chinese survival show Youth With You. In 2024, he released his first EP titled Stardust.

== Early life and education ==
The8 was born in Haicheng, Liaoning, China on November 7, 1997. He attended Beijing Contemporary Music Academy.

== Career ==
=== 2008–2013: Early actives in China ===
The8 began learning martial arts at the age of four and later trained in breaking for five years beginning in elementary school. He later joined a youth b-boy crew in China and developed skills in tumbling and acrobatics, while also participating in breaking competitions.

In 2008, The8 appeared on the Chinese program CCTV Variety Show. In February 2010, he appeared on Hunan Television's Day Day Up as the leader of the youth breaking crew Dance Power. During the appearance, the crew performed street dance, and when host Wang Han asked about his ambition, The8 said that he wanted to become a star.Audio of the exchange was later sampled in the opening of “Friend”, a track from his 2026 unit album V8 with Vernon.

In April 2012, The8 led Dance Power at the sixth BBOY IN SHANGHAI World Breaking Competition, where the crew reached the top eight of the global finals.

While attending school in Beijing, The8 continued training in breaking and was cast while taking a breaking class.

=== Late 2013–2015: Pledis training and pre-debut ===
While attending school in Beijing, The8 was scouted while taking a breaking class and then moved to South Korea to train under Pledis Entertainment. He began training with Pledis around December 2013, approximately one year and five months before Seventeen's debut.

In a 2020 retrospective segment from SEVENTEEN Comeback Show [Heng:garae], The8 recalled that while living in China he had watched videos that of the Seventeen trainees from the show and seen them as celebrities before meeting them in South Korea.

In July 2014, he began appearing with the group's pre-debut trainees during the fifth and final season of Seventeen TV, titled Last Seventeen TV.

Following Pledis' training process, The8 was confirmed as one of Seventeen's final 13 members in April 2015. He later appeared in the MBC Music reality series Seventeen Project: Debut Big Plan, which followed the group's preparations for debut.

=== 2015–present: Seventeen, solo activities and sub-unit activities ===
The8 debuted as a member of the South Korean boy band Seventeen with their first extended play (EP) 17 Carat on May 29, 2015. After debuting with Seventeen, The8 also landed a television role in Real Class - Elementary School in 2017. On December 12, 2017, Pledis Entertainment announced that The8 would be suspending his promotional activities due to a waist injury. He returned to promotions with the release of Seventeen's special album Directors Cut in February 2018.

In 2018, The8 participated in the Chinese reality television show Chao Yin Zhan Ji alongside bandmate Jun. In 2019, he served as one of the two dance coaches (alongside Jolin Tsai) in the Chinese survival show Youth With You. The8 made his solo debut on June 9, 2019, with the single "Dreams Come True". On May 4, 2020, he announced the release of a second single, "Falling Down", released four days later.

On April 8, 2021, The8 announced the release of his third single, "Side by Side". It was released on April 13 in both Chinese and Korean. On May 4, 2021, The8 released a single called "Mom's Missed Call" along with bandmate Jun, with all proceeds donated to help children in need in China. The single was a part of the Dandelion Philanthropy Music Project for the Chinese Children's Charity Association. In September 2021, Pledis Entertainment announced that The8, alongside bandmate Jun, would be temporarily taking a break from Seventeen activities in order to work in China for the rest of the year. The8 and Jun arrived back in South Korea late December that year.

On March 18, 2022, The8 released the single "Hai Cheng" (海城), which he dedicated to his hometown. On December 4, 2024, The8 released his first EP titled Stardust. The Chinese-language EP comprises three songs, including the lead single "Orbit" featuring JinJiBeWater. On February 2, 2025, The8 began serving as a producer and mentor in the survival show Chuang Asia: Season 2.

On June 29, 2026, The8 and Vernon debuted as V8, Seventeen's sixth sub-unit, with their self-titled debut EP V8. The eight-track EP explored electronic and hyperpop-influenced music and included the lead single "singasong", which The8 and Vernon co-composed with Mechatok, as well as The8's solo track "8DM".

== Discography ==
=== Extended plays ===
List of extended plays, showing selected details
Title	Details	Certifications
Stardust	Released: December 4, 2024; Label: Pledis Entertainment; Formats: NFC card (in China), digital download, streaming; Track listing: 1. "54321 (Lift Off)" (feat. Vernon); 2. "Orbit" (feat. JinJiBeWater_隼); 3. "Cold Love"	QQ: Diamond

=== Singles ===
Title	Year	Peak chart positions		Album
Title	Year	CHN	KOR DL	Album
"Night and Rain"	2018	—	—	Non-album singles
"Dreams Come True"	2019	—	—	Non-album singles
"Falling Down"	2020	—	—	Non-album singles
"Side by Side" (Note: Released in Chinese and Korean)	2020	—	126	Non-album singles
"Mom's Missed Call" (妈妈的未接来电) (Note: Charity single) (with Jun)	2021	—	—	Non-album singles
"Hai Cheng" (海城) (Note: Released in Chinese and Korean)	2022	—	—	Non-album singles
"A Bite of Summer" (嘗一口夏天)	2022	—	—	Non-album singles
"Orbit" (轨道) (feat. JinJiBeWater_隼)	2024	8	14	Stardust
"Star Crossing Night" (feat. Gali)	2025	5	—	Non-album single
"—" denotes releases that did not chart or were not released in that region.

=== Other charted songs ===
Title	Year	Peak chart positions		Album
Title	Year	CHN	KOR	Album
"54321 (Lift Off)" (feat. Vernon)	2024	23	— (Note: "54321 (Lift Off)" did not enter the Circle Digital Chart, but peaked at number 64 on the Circle Downloads Chart.)	Stardust
"Cold Love"	2024	25	— (Note: "Cold Love" did not enter the Circle Digital Chart, but peaked at number 65 on the Circle Downloads Chart.)	Stardust
"Skyfall" (Note: Credited under Seventeen but is a solo track performed by The8.)	2025	7	52	Happy Burstday
"8DM"	2026	—	81	V8

=== Soundtrack appearances ===
Title	Year	Album	Notes
"Pāi Shǒu (Live)" (拍手)	2018	Chao Yin Zhan Ji Episode 2	Chinese version of Seventeen's "Clap"
"My I (Live)" (with Jun)	2018	Chao Yin Zhan Ji Episode 4	Chinese version of Seventeen's "My I"
"Twinkle Twinkle Little Star (Live)" (小星星) (with Zhou Zhennan)	2018	Chao Yin Zhan Ji Episode 5	
"Secret (Live)" (秘密) (with Victor Ma)	2018	Chao Yin Zhan Ji Episode 6	Original by Chang Chen-yue
"Wǒ Yuàn Yì (Live)" (我愿意) (with Sara Liu, Victor Ma)	2018	Chao Yin Zhan Ji Episode 7	Original by Faye Wong
"Supernatural (Live)" (超自然) (with Victor Ma)	2018	Chao Yin Zhan Ji Episode 8	
"In My Feelings (Live)" (with Victor Ma)	2018	Chao Yin Zhan Ji Episode 9	Original by Drake
"Busy and Blind (Live)" (忙与盲) (with Victor Ma)	2018	Chao Yin Zhan Ji Episode 9	Original by Sylvia Chang
"Just...Pǔ Tōng Friends (Live)" (Just...普通 Friends) (with Victor Ma)	2018	Chao Yin Zhan Ji Episode 10	Cover of Musiq Soulchild's "Just Friends (Sunny)"
"Fall In Love (Live)" (with Victor Ma)	2018	Chao Yin Zhan Ji Episode 10	
"Highlight (Live)" (with Li Zhenning, Shi Mingze, Zhan Yu, Bo Yuan, Wen Yechen, Shen Qunfeng, Wu Zelin)	2019	Youth With You Episode 11	Original by Seventeen
"Brothers for One Time" (兄弟一回) (with Jun)	2019	Seven Days OST	
"Maze"	2020	The King: Eternal Monarch Chinese version OST	Original by Paul Kim
"Hide" (藏)	2021	Who is the Murderer (谁是凶手) OST	
"Youth Is Young" (青春就这Young) (with Wang Baoqiang, Yang Di, Chen Zheyuan, Shen Yue, Zhang Yitong)	2023	Youth Periplous Season 4 (青春环游记 第四季) OST	
"Fly! Birdy Friends"	2024	Protect the Black Forest! Birdy Friends OST	Korean and Chinese versions
"Hào Dí Sa Huá Fán" (浩迪Sa华凡) (with Charlene Choi, Yang Di, Henry Lau, Lars Huang)	2024	Youth Periplous Season 5 (青春環游記 第五季) OST	
"Time Spoken in Ink" (时光语墨)	2024	My Wife's Double Life OST	
"When The Wind Blows" (风吹来的时候)	2024	Love's Rebellion OST	

== Filmography ==
=== Television shows ===
Year	Title	Role
2010	Day Day Up	Cast member
2017	Real Class - Elementary School	Cast member
2018	Chao Yin Zhan Ji (潮音戰紀)	Cast member
2019	Youth With You	Dance mentor
2021	Dancing Millennium	Cast member
2023	All-Star Street Dancing Show	Cast member
2023	Youth Periplous Season 4	Cast member
2024	Youth Periplous Season 5	Cast member
2024	Heart Signal Season 7	Cast member
2025	Chuang Asia: Season 2	Producer
