= Jun (Chinese entertainer) =

South Korean-based Chinese singer and actor (born 1996)

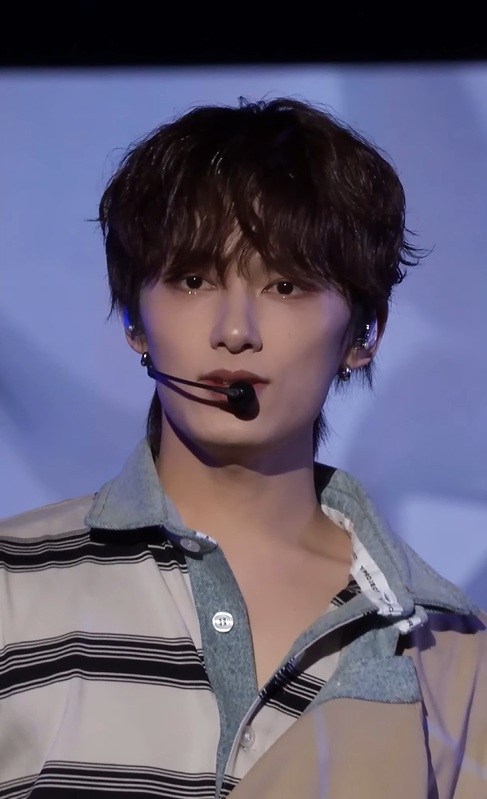
- Jun in March 2024
- Born: Wen Junhui; 10 June 1996 (age 30); Shenzhen, Guangdong, China
- Occupations: Singer; actor; dancer; songwriter
- Years active: 1998–present
- Musical career
- Genres: K-pop; Mandopop
- Instruments: Vocals; piano
- Years active: 2015–present
- Label: Pledis
- Member of: Seventeen

Chinese name
- Traditional Chinese: 文俊輝
- Simplified Chinese: 文俊辉
Transcriptions
Standard Mandarin
- Hanyu Pinyin: Wén Jùnhuī
- IPA: [wə̌n tɕwə̂nxwéɪ]

Wen Junhui (Chinese: 文俊辉; pinyin: Wén Jùnhuī; born 10 June 1996), known professionally as Jun (Korean: 준), is a Chinese singer, actor, and dancer working in South Korea and China. Managed by Pledis Entertainment, he is a member of the South Korean boy band Seventeen and its performance team.

Before debuting as a member of Seventeen, Jun was a child actor who starred in multiple films including The Pye Dog (2007), The Legend Is Born: Ip Man (2010), and Chinese web drama Intouchable (2015). In 2023, he returned to acting with a lead role in iQIYI's Exclusive Fairytale. In 2025, he returned to films with a supporting role in The Shadow's Edge.

Alongside his work with Seventeen, he has released multiple songs in his native language, including "Limbo" and "Psycho", the former of which garnered him an award at the Tencent Music Entertainment Awards for New Singer-Songwriter of the Year.

== Early life ==
Wen Junhui was born on 10 June 1996. He grew up in Shenzhen, Guangdong, China, and attended Buji Senior High School. He learned wushu since he was young, with aspirations of becoming a martial arts actor like Jackie Chan. He also learned the piano and has performed arrangements of Seventeen's songs.

== Career ==
=== 1998–2012: Early career in China ===
Jun entered the entertainment industry as a child. He was scouted at the age of two and appeared in his first advertisement alongside Hong Kong actor Nick Cheung. He later recalled that he began working as a child actor in China at around the age of three. He appeared in numerous television series, including SWAT Dragon (特警飞龙) at the age of five, and the ATV dramas Cross Border Daddy (爸爸两边走) and its sequel Go! Go! Daddy (爸爸向前走).

In 2007, Jun appeared as Lin Zhihong in the Hong Kong film The Pye-Dog. His performance earned him a nomination for Best New Performer at the 27th Hong Kong Film Awards.

During this period, Jun also trained in martial arts. He later said that he had studied martial arts for approximately two years before beginning his trainee career, while later reporting described his childhood training as including traditional Chinese martial arts. In 2010, he portrayed the young Ip Man in the martial-arts film The Legend Is Born: Ip Man.

Jun continued working as an actor near the end of this period. He appeared in the film My Mother (我的母亲), portraying the protagonist's teenage son. The film was released in China on September 17, 2013.

=== 2012–2015: Pledis trainee and early activities ===
In 2012, Jun was scouted by Pledis Entertainment while at a convenience store in China.In October 2012, Jun moved to South Korea to undergo training under Pledis Entertainment.

As a trainee, Jun appeared in Seventeen TV, an online program broadcast through Ustream that documented the development and training process of Pledis's planned boy group, Seventeen. During the show seasons, he was also shown preparing performances for the Like Seventeen concerts alongside the other trainees. In August and September 2014, he also participated in WAPOP Show 2.

In December 2014, Pledis announced that Jun had been cast in the Chinese web drama Intouchable (男神执事团), which aired the following year.

During the final months before Seventeen's debut, the group continued its online broadcasting activities. On February 20, 2015, Seventeen aired a Lunar New Year pilot titled Hoshi and Seungkwan's Andromeda (호시, 승관의 안드로메다) through AfreecaTV. The program continued as a means of communication between Seventeen and their fans.

By 2015, Jun had been selected as one of Seventeen's thirteen members. In April, Pledis publicly introduced the finalized lineup through a series of individual teasers ahead of Seventeen Project: Big Debut Plan. The MBC reality series began airing on May 2 and followed the thirteen-member lineup through a series of missions leading to their official debut. The MBC show premiered on May 2, followed the finalized lineup as they completed a series of missions in preparation for their official debut.

=== 2015–present: Debut with Seventeen ===
He debuted as a member of Seventeen on 26 May 2015 under the stage name Jun. The group's first EP 17 Carat was released three days later, on 29 May 2015.

In 2018, Jun and group member The8 participated in the Chinese music reality show Chao Yin Zhan Ji (潮音战纪). Jun won the first solo stage competition on the show with his performance of "Wo Ming Bai" (我明白), a Chinese cover of Seventeen's "Thanks", for which he wrote the lyrics. From October to December 2018, he co-hosted the Chinese music ranking show called Yo! Bang (由你音乐榜样).

=== 2018–present: Solo career and other ventures ===
Jun released his first solo song and special single album Can You Sit By My Side (能不能坐在我身旁), which he co-wrote lyrics for, on 14 December 2018. In July 2019, he filmed a music video for the NetEase mobile game A Dream of Jianghu (一梦江湖). In 2020, he participated in the soundtrack of The King: Eternal Monarch with the song "Dream" in Chinese.

On 5 February 2021, Jun released the single "Crow" (乌鸦); it was later repackaged onto his second single album Silent Boarding Gate (寂寞号登机口) released on 14 February. His single "Crow" entered the Billboard World Digital Song Sales chart at number 14 after less than one week of its release, marking Jun's debut as a solo artist on the Billboard charts.

On 23 September 2022, Jun released his third digital single "Limbo" with two versions in Korean and Chinese. In China, he sold 29,000 copies of the digital album containing both tracks on QQ Music within the first week of release. The Korean version peaked at 26 on the Bugs Real-Time chart and became his first song to chart on the platform. On Melon, the track entered the daily chart for 23 September at 723, an improvement from "Crow" which had ranked at 948. On the Melon latest 24h (1 week) chart, "Limbo" (Korean Ver.) peaked at 14.

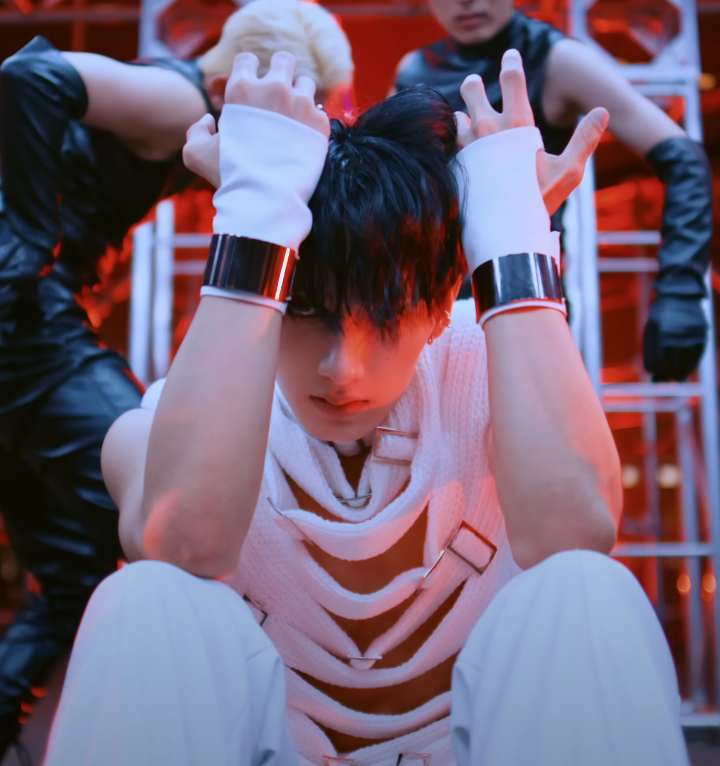
Jun in the performance video for "Psycho" in 2023

Jun made an acting comeback as the male lead in the 2023 drama, Exclusive Fairytale (独家童话). He won the Rising Star of the Year Award at the 2023 Asia Contents Awards & Global OTT Awards during the Busan International Film Festival.

On 4 July 2023, Jun released his fourth digital single "Psycho". On 8 July, he attended the Tencent Music Entertainment Awards and won the "New Singer-Songwriter of the Year" award. The next day, he performed "Limbo" and "Psycho" as a solo artist at the TMEA Music Festival, and also performed as a member of Seventeen.

On 12 August 2024, it was announced that Jun would be taking a break from group activities in South Korea in favor of acting activities in China, and would therefore be absent from the group's scheduled performances at Lollapalooza Berlin in early September, music show performances for Spill the Feels, and the Right Here World Tour. Over the next seven months, he took on roles in two films—Blades of the Guardians (镖人：风起大漠) and The Shadow's Edge (捕风追影)—and one television series, The Whimsical Return (云归喜事).

On 16 August 2025, The Shadow's Edge was released in mainland China, and subsequently screened in 19 countries and regions worldwide. Starring alongside Jackie Chan and Tony Leung Ka-fai, Jun played the role of Hu Feng, a member of a theft ring. His performance earned him a nomination for Best Supporting Actor at the 38th Hundred Flowers Awards in August 2026.

== Ambassadorships ==
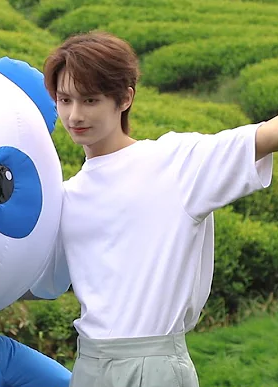
Jun for ChaPanda in 2024

In February 2024, Jun was announced by iTravel Shenzhen as a travel ambassador for Shenzhen, his hometown. In April, he was announced as the ambassador for skincare brand Filorga. In May, he was announced as the ambassador for bubble tea brand ChaPanda.

== Public image ==
His looks have garnered him the nicknames by fans: "The Miracle of Mainland" (大陸の奇跡) in Japan and "Big Beauty" (大漂亮) in China. He is also known to fans as the "Little Prince of Shenzhen Metro" (深圳地铁小王子) because a series of public service announcements he filmed for the Shenzhen Metro in middle school are still being aired on certain trains.

== Discography ==
=== Singles ===
Title	Year	Peak chart position	Album	Sales
Title	Year	CHN	Album	Sales
"Can You Sit By My Side" (能不能坐在我身旁)	2018	71	Non-album singles	
"Crow" (乌鸦)	2021	40	Non-album singles	
"Silent Boarding Gate" (寂寞号登机口)	2021	57	Non-album singles	
"Mom's Missed Call" (妈妈的未接来电) (with The8) (Note: A charity single for the benefit of China Children's Charity Association.)	2021	—	Non-album singles	
"Fall in Love"	2021	—	Non-album singles	
"Limbo" (Note: Released in Chinese and Korean versions.)	2022	—	Non-album singles	CHN: 50,000
"Psycho"	2023	—	Non-album singles	CHN: 100,000
"Worth It" (值得) (Note: Sammi Cheng cover)	2025	—	Non-album singles	
"—" denotes releases that did not chart or were not released in that region.

=== Other charted songs ===
Title	Year	Peak chart positions	Album
Title	Year	KOR	Album
"Gemini" (쌍둥이자리) (Note: Credited under Seventeen but is a solo track performed by Jun.)	2025	72	Happy Burstday

=== Soundtrack appearances ===
Title	Year	Peak chart position	Album
Title	Year	CHN	Album
"Wo Ming Bai" (我明白) (Note: Chinese rearranged version of Seventeen's song, "Thanks".)	2018	—	潮音战纪 第1期
"My I" (Chinese Ver. with The8)	2018	—	潮音战纪 第4期
"The Last Blossom" (开到荼蘼) (with Yan An) (Note: Cover of Faye Wong's 1999 song "開到荼蘼".)	2018	—	潮音战纪 第5期
"The Night Is Too Dark" (夜太黑) (Note: Cover of Sandy Lam's 1996 song of the same name.)	2018	—	潮音战纪 第6期
"BB 88" (with Tia Ray and Yan An) (Note: Cover of Khalil Fong's 2012 song of the same name.)	2018	—	潮音战纪 第7期
"Reflection of Desire" (欲望反光) (Note: Cover of Jam Hsiao's 2018 song of the same name.)	2018	—	潮音战纪 第9期
"Run! Frantic Flowers!" (末路狂花) (Note: Cover of Waa Wei's 2016 song of the same name.)	2018	—	潮音战纪 第10期
"Brothers for One Time" (兄弟一回) (with The8)	2019	—	Seven Days OST
"Dream" (Chinese Ver.) (Note: Chinese cover of Paul Kim's Korean soundtrack of the same name.)	2020	61	The King: Eternal Monarch Chinese OST
"Warrior" (逆燃) (with Joshua, Mingyu, The8, Vernon) (Note: Joshua, Jun, The8, Mingyu, and Vernon are credited individually in Chinese music platforms but are credited collectively under Seventeen in global music platforms.)	2021	—	Falling into Your Smile OST
"Exclusive Fairytale" (独家童话)	2023	—	Exclusive Fairytale OST
"Run Like Gump" (赤脚的人)	2024	24	2024 Midsummer Graduation Gala OST
"Scorching Moon" (焚月)	2025	32	The Vendetta of An OST
"—" denotes releases that did not chart or were not released in that region.

=== Songwriting credits ===
Credits are adapted from the Korea Music Copyright Association unless otherwise specified.

Year	Song	Artist	Album	Lyrics		Music		KOMCA Works Code
Year	Song	Artist	Album	Credited	With	Credited	With	KOMCA Works Code
2016	"Highlight" (Performance Team)	Seventeen	Going Seventeen	Yes	Bumzu, Hoshi, Dino, The8, Lee Yoo-jung	No	—N/a	100001489458
2017	"My I" (Jun and The8)	Seventeen	Al1	Yes	Bumzu, The8	No	—N/a	100001586543
2017	"Hello"	Seventeen	Teen, Age	Yes	Bumzu, DK, Mingyu	No	—N/a	100001731909
2018	"Wo Ming Bai" (我明白)	Wen Junhui	Non-album singles	Yes	Bumzu, Woozi, Hoshi	No	—N/a	—N/a
2018	"My I" (Chinese Ver.)	Wen Junhui, Xu Minghao	Non-album singles	Yes	Bumzu, The8	No	—N/a	—N/a
2018	"Reflection of Desire" (欲望反光) (Note: Wen Junhui (Jun) is credited as a producer/arranger, together with LironMan and Nmore.)	Wen Junhui	Non-album singles	No	—N/a	No	—N/a	—N/a
2018	"Can You Sit By My Side" (能不能坐在我身旁)	Wen Junhui	Non-album singles	Yes	Song Bingyang	No	—N/a	100002735634
2019	"Home" (Chinese Ver.)	Seventeen	Non-album singles	Yes	Bumzu, The8, Tina Wang, Woozi	No	—N/a	—N/a
2021	"Wave" (Performance Team)	Seventeen	Your Choice	Yes	Bumzu, Woozi, Dino, Hoshi, The8	No	—N/a	100003457441
2022	"Limbo" (Korean/Chinese Ver.)	Wen Junhui	Non-album singles	Yes	Glenn, JOZU	Yes	Beomhun Lee, Glenn, JOZU	100004515003
2023	"Psycho"	Wen Junhui	Non-album singles	Yes	Glenn, PonyZhang	Yes	Glenn, BuildingOwner	100005190169
2023	"God of Light Music" (경음악의 신)	Seventeen	Non-album singles	Yes	Bumzu, S.Coups, Woozi, Vernon, Mingyu	No	—N/a	100005501175
2025	"Encircled" (동그라미)	Seventeen	Non-album singles	Yes	S.Coups, Woozi, Wonwoo, Dino, Hoshi, Vernon, Mingyu, DK, Seungkwan, The8, Joshua	No	—N/a	100006657485
2025	"Gemini" (쌍둥이자리) (Jun Solo)	Seventeen	Happy Burstday	Yes	Hwang Yoo-bin (XYXX), Jo Yoon-kyeong	No	—N/a	100006752943

== Filmography ==
=== Films ===
Year	English title	Chinese title	Role	Ref.
2007	The Pye Dog	野·良犬	Lin Zhihong	
2010	The Legend Is Born: Ip Man	叶问前传	Ip Man (young)	
2011	Powers	权力有限	Mayor's son	
2013	My Mother	我的母亲	Lin Yilong	
2025	The Shadow's Edge	捕风追影	Hu Feng	
2026	Blades of the Guardians	镖人：风起大漠	Yuji Niuluo	
2026	Go For Broke 2	重生2	Su Cheng	
TBA	Summer Never Ends	再给我一个暑假	Jin Jiugang	

=== Television and web series ===
Year	English title	Chinese title	Role	Notes	Ref.
2002	SWAT Dragon	特警飞龙	Zhong Zai		
2003	Give Me Folly	歌让我狂	Ye Feng (young)		
2004	Cross Border Daddy	爸爸两边走	Zeng Cheng		
2005	Go! Go! Daddy	爸爸向前走	Zeng Cheng		
2005	Family Style	家风	Zai Zai		
2010	Drunk Red Dust	醉红尘	Xiao Xiao Jiu (young)		
2010	Da Ming Pin Fei	大明嫔妃	Zhu Youjiao		
2010	Destiny of the Jade	乱世玉缘	Shi Dongyuan (young)		
2010	Who's the Hero	胜者为王	—N/a	Cameo	
2011	Large Hankou	大汉口	Lu Xiuwu (young)		
2012	Pearl Dragon	明珠游龙	Son of Zhang Baozhu		
2012	Love Under the Roof	爱在屋檐下	Hai Tian (young)		
2012	Children's Wars	儿女的战争	Liu Xiaofeng		
2013	Xue Dingshan	薛丁山	Xue Yinglong		
2015	Intouchable [zh]	男神执事团	Little Dracula	Web series	
2023	Exclusive Fairytale	独家童话	Ling Chao	Web series	
TBA	The Whimsical Return	云归喜事	Wen Liangchen	Web series	

=== Variety shows ===
Year	English title	Chinese title	Role	Notes	Ref.
2018	Chao Yin Zhan Ji	潮音战纪	Regular cast member	10 episodes	
2018	Yo! Bang	由你音乐榜样	Regular MC	Episode 1-3, 6-9	
2021	Super Novae Games Season 4	超新星运动会第四季	Archery competition participant		
2023	Yell For Fun	野挺有趣	Cast member	Episode 3-5	
2024	The Detectives' Adventures Season 4	萌探2024	Cast member	Episode 4, 5, 10	
2024	It Sounds Incredible Season 4	听说很好吃第四季	Regular cast member		

=== Galas ===
Year	English title	Chinese title	Role	Ref.
2024	2024 Douyin Spring Festival Eve Party	抖音年年有你小年夜晚会	Performer	
2024	2024 Jiangsu TV Spring Festival Gala	2024江苏卫视春节联欢晚会	Performer	
2024	2024 Jiangsu TV Lantern Festival Gala	2024江苏卫视元宵晚会	Performer	
2024	2024 Douyin Midsummer Graduation Gala	2024抖音仲夏毕业歌会	Performer	
2025	2025 Douyin Midsummer Graduation Gala	2025抖音仲夏毕业歌会	Performer	

== Awards and nominations ==
Year presented, name of the award ceremony, category, nominee of the award, and the result of the nomination
Year	Award	Category	Nominee / Work	Result	Ref.
2008	2007 Hong Kong Film Directors' Guild Awards	New Performer of the Year Silver Award	The Pye Dog	Won	
2008	27th Hong Kong Film Awards	Best New Performer	The Pye Dog	Nominated	
2023	4th Tencent Music Entertainment Awards	New Singer-Songwriter of the Year	"Limbo"	Won	
2023	2023 Asia Contents Awards & Global OTT Awards	Best Newcomer Actor	Exclusive Fairytale	Nominated	
2023	2023 Asia Contents Awards & Global OTT Awards	Rising Star of the Year	Exclusive Fairytale	Won	
2023	2023 Tencent Entertainment White Paper Awards	Breakthrough Star of the Year	Self	Won	
2026	38th Hundred Flowers Awards	Best Supporting Actor	The Shadow's Edge	Nominated	
