= Indiepost =

South Korean online magazine

- Website type: Online magazine
- Available in: Korean
- Owner: Ahn Byeongtae
- Creators: Ahn Byeongtae, Shim Woochul, Lee Samin
- Website: indiepost.co.kr
- Launched: 2015
- Current status: Active

Indiepost (Korean: 인디포스트) is a South Korean online magazine that publishes articles, columns, and interviews of cultural topics such as music and film. The webzine was formed by CEO Ahn Byeongtae, who led the video content business at SK Telecom, the mobile service expert director Shim Woo-chul, and the indie culture editor Lee Samin. And they were established as a company called IndiePost & Media in November 2015. They said they have a motto of "We Curate Values".
