= Happy Burstday =

- Digital cover

Studio album by Seventeen
- Released: May 26, 2025
- Length: 49:19
- Languages: Korean; English
- Label: Pledis

Seventeen chronology
| Spill the Feels (2024) | Happy Burstday (2025) |

Singles from Happy Burstday
- 1. "Thunder" Released: May 26, 2025

Happy Burstday is the fifth studio album by South Korean boy band Seventeen. It was released on May 26, 2025, by Pledis Entertainment through YG Plus, and celebrates their tenth anniversary as a band by entering a new chapter, marked as an "explosive rebirth".

The album includes sixteen songs, including its lead single, "Thunder", and a solo song from each of the members of Seventeen. Among the songs are collaborations with American record producers Pharrell Williams and Timbaland.

== Background and release ==
Pledis Entertainment first revealed plans to release a studio album in celebration of Seventeen's tenth anniversary on March 24, 2025, with contributions from all 13 members, even those fulfilling their military enlistments. On April 21, the group announced their fifth studio album and their first album release since Face the Sun (2022). The announcement clip showed a floating envelope with information revealed on the back of the envelope and later panned to a birthday cake with candles spelling out "Happy Burstday". During the clip, an upcoming tour to promote the album was also teased, alongside the debut of a new sub-unit.

The release celebrates the 10th anniversary of the band, after their debut on May 26, 2015, and their first EP 17 Carat on May 29. Happy Burstday as the album title reflects the anniversary, symbolizing a "milestone" as well as a "renaissance" for the group. "Burst" was said to express the "explosive rebirth", being unafraid to hail in a new chapter. It sees the group leaping into a new era, one that "embraces reinvention, fearlessness, and evolution".

A teaser video was released on April 28 titled "Dare or Death", with the viewer able to select between the two options. Three further concept videos were released, with themes of disappearance, transformation and rebirth. The track list for the album was released on May 13, and a highlight medley of the songs was released on May 16.

== Promotion ==
To promote the album, Pledis held a listening party from May 17 to 21, allowing fans to preview the songs. On May 25, the group performed an hour-long set at Jamsu Bridge in Seoul, as the culmination of a three day "B-Day Party". A website was launched on May 12 detailing the activities involved in the event, including a stamp rally, merchandise and photo booths, among others. The group also released a two-part special episode of Going Seventeen, with the first part released on May 21 and the second released on May 28.

The group also announced a collaboration with Airbnb, with 60 fans selected through a lucky draw to participate in an event with the members.

== Critical reception ==
Professional ratings for Happy Burstday
Review scores
| Source | Rating |
|---|---|
| Clash | 8/10 |
| NME | 3/5 stars |

Clash's Isadora Wandermurem praised Happy Burstday for its strong production and willingness to explore each identity of Seventeen's thirteen-member group; however, it also criticized its execution of the latter, noting the album's overall lack of cohesion. In a mixed three-star review for NME, Gladys Yeo likewise stated: "The record’s focus on solo songs exposes each member’s strengths and weaknesses when they stand alone, but its group tracks are a self-assured testament to their chemistry and magnetism as a whole."

== Track listing ==
Track listing
| No. | Title | Lyrics | Music | Arrangement | Length |
|---|---|---|---|---|---|
| 1. | "HBD" | Bumzu; Woozi | Bumzu; Building Owner; Woozi; Young Chance; Benjamin55; John Stary; Samuel Lee; Desmond Copeland | | 2:35 |
| 2. | "Thunder" | Bumzu; Woozi | Bumzu; S.Coups; Woozi | Bumzu | 2:44 |
| 3. | "Bad Influence" | Pharrell Williams | Williams | | 2:47 |
| 4. | "Skyfall" (The8 solo) | Vernon; The8; Robb Roy | The8; Nicolkeem; Robb Roy; Numbernine | Nicolkeem; Numbernine | 3:00 |
| 5. | "Fortunate Change" (Joshua solo) | Woozi | Woozi; Ohway! | Woozi; Ohway! | 3:37 |
| 6. | "99.9%" (Wonwoo solo) | Woozi | El Capitxn; Woozi; Vendors Zenur | El Capitxn; Vendors Zenur | 3:05 |
| 7. | "Raindrops" (Seungkwan solo) | Seungkwan; Ha Hyun-sang | Seungkwan; Ha Hyun-sang | Shin Seung-ick | 3:44 |
| 8. | "Damage" (Hoshi solo, featuring Timbaland) | Woozi; Hoshi | Woozi; Angel Lopez; Federico Vindver; Timbaland | | 2:43 |
| 9. | "Shake It Off" (Mingyu solo) | Mingyu; Shannon Bae; Samuel Arredondo | Mingyu; Ioah | | 2:48 |
| 10. | "Happy Virus" (DK solo) | Woozi; DK | Building Owner; Woozi | Building Owner; Woozi | 3:14 |
| 11. | "Destiny" (Woozi solo, 운명; Unmyeong) | Bumzu | Bumzu; Park Ki-tae | Bumzu; Park Ki-tae | 4:21 |
| 12. | "Shining Star" (Vernon solo) | Vernon; Robb Roy | Robb Roy; Numbernine; Virgin Kim; Reiji Okamoto | Numbernine; Virgin Kim; Sejun Park | 3:21 |
| 13. | "Gemini" (Jun solo, 쌍둥이자리; Ssangdungijari) | Hwang Yoobin; Jun; Cho Yun Kyoung | Ele; Vincenzo; Linda Quero; Jordan Shaw | | 3:10 |
| 14. | "Trigger" (Dino solo) | Dino | Ghstloop; Pdogg; Hanna Ninos; William Segerdahl; Count Baldor; Brad Loughead | | 2:29 |
| 15. | "Coincidence" (Jeonghan solo, 우연; Uyeon) | Woozi | Woozi; Lee Beom-hun | Woozi; Lee | 2:43 |
| 16. | "Jungle" (S.Coups solo) | S.Coups | Bumzu; S.Coups | Bumzu; Building Owner | 2:33 |
| Total length: | | | | | 49:19 |

LP special edition bonus track
| No. | Title | Lyrics | Music | Producer(s) | Length |
|---|---|---|---|---|---|
| 17. | "Bad Influence" (explicit version) | Williams | Williams | Williams; Larson | 2:44 |
| Total length: | | | | | 52:03 |

== Personnel ==
Credits adapted from Tidal

Primary vocals

- S.Coups – vocals (tracks 1–3, 16)
- Jeonghan – vocals (track 15)
- Joshua – vocals (tracks 1–3, 5)
- Jun – vocals (tracks 1–3, 13)
- Hoshi – vocals (tracks 1–3, 8)
- Wonwoo – vocals (tracks 1–3, 6)
- Woozi – vocals (tracks 1–3, 5)
- The8 – vocals (tracks 1–3, 4)
- Mingyu – vocals (tracks 1–3, 9)
- DK – vocals (tracks 1–3, 10)
- Seungkwan – vocals (tracks 1–3, 7)
- Vernon – vocals (tracks 1–3, 12)
- Dino – vocals (tracks 1–3, 14)

Background vocals

- Bumzu – background vocals (tracks 1–2, 16)
- Glenn – background vocals (tracks 1–2, 5, 8, 10, 14)
- Jozu – background vocals (tracks 3, 13)
- ONE.KI – background vocals (tracks 6, 15)
- Ha Hyunsang – background vocals (track 7)
- Seungkwan – background vocals (track 7)
- Shannon Bae – background vocals (tracks 8, 16)
- Woozi – background vocals (track 10)
- Vernon – background vocals (track 12)

Technical

- Namwoo Kwon – mastering engineer
- Jin Jeon – mixing engineer (tracks 1–2, 8–9, 14, 16)
- Leslie Brathwaite – mixing engineer (track 3)
- Mike Larson – mixing engineer (track 3)
- Cheongmoo Lee – mixing engineer (track 4)
- Bongwon Shin – mixing engineer (tracks 5, 13)
- JongPil GU – mixing engineer (tracks 6, 11–12)
- Anchor – mixing engineer (track 10)
- Jeon Buyeon – mixing engineer (track 15)
- Namjun Park – assistant mixing engineer (tracks 5, 13)
- Rose Hong – assistant mixing engineer (tracks 6, 11–12)
- Ji Min Woo – assistant mixing engineer (track 7)
- Kim Jun Young – assistant mixing engineer (track 7)
- Bumzu – recording engineer (tracks 1–3, 9, 16)
- Glenn – recording engineer (tracks 1–2, 5, 8, 13)
- Benjamin Thomas – recording engineer (track 3)
- Lee DongGeun – recording engineer (tracks 3, 10, 13)
- Tak Hyun Gwan – recording engineer (track 3)
- Lee Pyungwook – recording engineer (track 4)
- Bokyeong Wang – recording engineer (track 5)
- Hwang Minhee – recording engineer (tracks 6–7, 11, 15)
- Hong Sooyeon – recording engineer (track 7)
- Jozu – recording engineer (tracks 10, 13)
- virgin kim – recording engineer (track 12)
- Kim gyu bin – recording engineer (track 12)
- Gesture – recording engineer (track 13)
- Yang Ga – recording engineer (track 14)

== Charts ==
=== Weekly charts ===
Weekly chart performance
| Chart (2025) | Peak position |
|---|---|
| Austrian Albums (Ö3 Austria) | 12 |
| Belgian Albums (Ultratop Flanders) | 25 |
| Belgian Albums (Ultratop Wallonia) | 18 |
| Croatian International Albums (HDU) | 9 |
| French Albums (SNEP) | 14 |
| Greek Albums (IFPI) | 3 |
| Hungarian Albums (MAHASZ) | 32 |
| Japanese Albums (Oricon) | 1 |
| Japanese Combined Albums (Oricon) | 1 |
| Japanese Hot Albums (Billboard Japan) | 1 |
| Polish Albums (ZPAV) | 92 |
| Portuguese Albums (AFP) | 39 |
| South Korean Albums (Circle) | 1 |
| Spanish Albums (PROMUSICAE) | 63 |
| Swedish Physical Albums (Sverigetopplistan) | 19 |
| Swiss Albums (Schweizer Hitparade) | 39 |
| UK Album Downloads (Official Charts) | 38 |
| US Billboard 200 | 2 |
| US World Albums (Billboard) | 1 |

=== Monthly charts ===
Monthly chart performance
| Chart (2025) | Position |
|---|---|
| Japanese Albums (Oricon) | 1 |
| South Korean Albums (Circle) | 1 |

=== Year-end charts ===
Year-end chart performance
| Chart (2025) | Position |
|---|---|
| Japanese Albums (Oricon) | 7 |
| Japanese Combined Albums (Oricon) | 7 |
| Japanese Hot Albums (Billboard Japan) | 32 |
| South Korean Albums (Circle) | 2 |

== Certifications ==
Certifications
| Region | Certification | Certified units/sales |
|---|---|---|
| Japan (RIAJ) | 2× Platinum | 500,000^{^} |
| South Korea (KMCA) | 2× Million | 2,000,000^{^} |
^{^} Shipments figures based on certification alone.

== Release history ==
Release history
| Region | Date | Format | Label | Ref. |
|---|---|---|---|---|
| Various | May 26, 2025 | Digital download; streaming | Pledis; YG Plus | |
| South Korea | May 26, 2025 | CD; Kit album; QR code | Pledis; YG Plus | |
| Japan | May 27, 2025 | CD; Kit album; QR code | Pledis | |
| United States | May 30, 2025 | CD | Pledis; Interscope | |
| Various | October 24, 2025 | Vinyl LP | Pledis | |
