= Kirara (musician) =

South Korean electronic musician

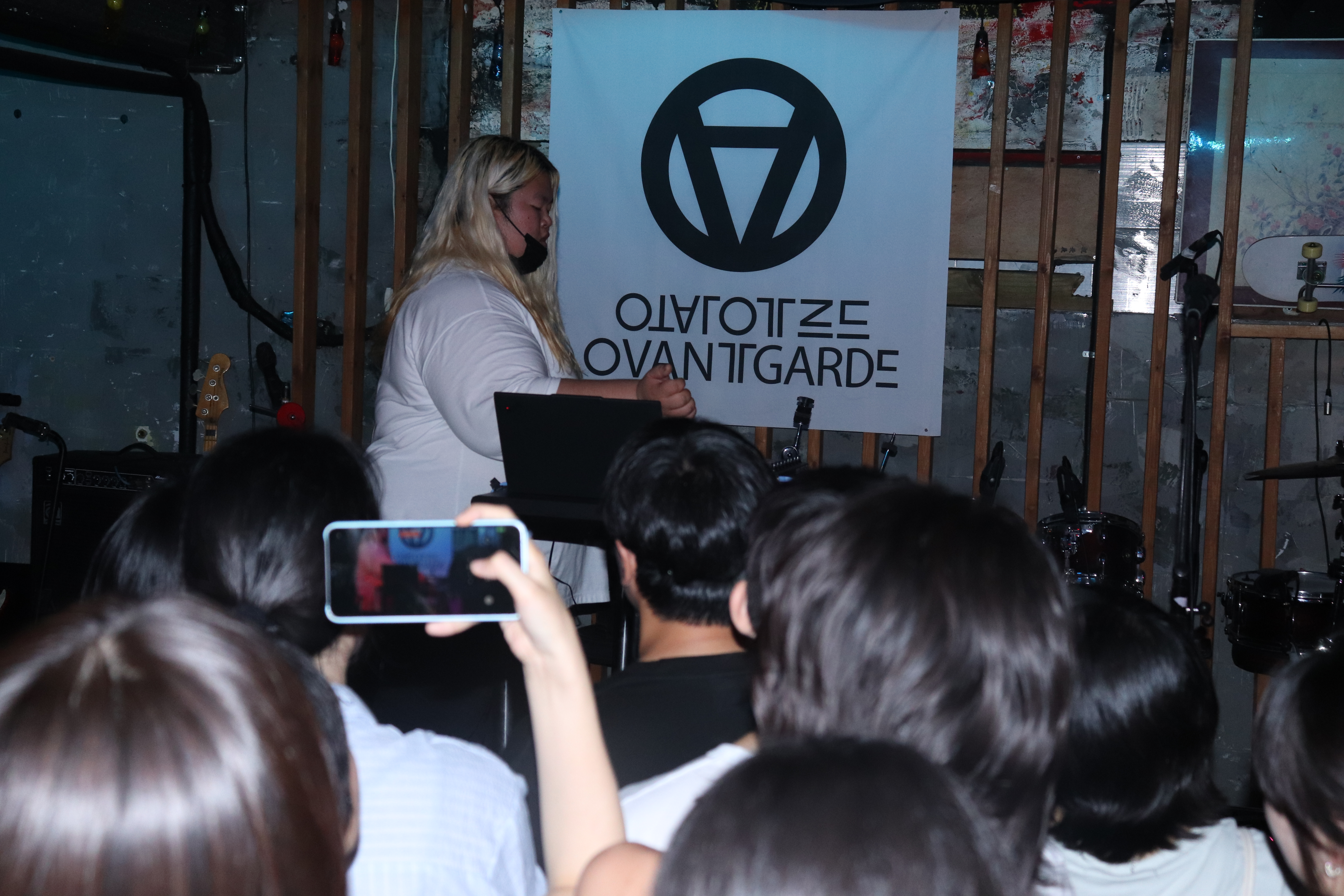

Background information
- Also known as: STQ Project, DJ Nonghyup
- Born: April 26, 1992 (age 34)
- Origin: South Korea
- Genres: Electronic, big beat, house
- Years active: 2014–present
- Labels: Kami Music, EBB Music
- Website: kirararararararara.com

Kirara (stylised as KIRARA) (Korean: 키라라; 26 April 1992) is a South Korean electronic musician. She released her debut EP cts1 in 2014, and has since released four studio albums: Rcts (2014), Moves (2016), Sarah (2018) and 4 (2021). The album Moves won best dance & electronic album at the 2017 Korean Music Awards. Kirara is known for using the catchphrase "키라라는 이쁘고 강합니다. 여러분은 춤을 춥니다. (Kirara is pretty and strong. And you guys are dancing.)" She taught many musicians through the Kirara Academy, and musicians such as Jang Myung Sun and Guinneissik learned music from her.

== History ==
Kirara was born in 1992. She started making music at the age of 12, and described her teenage years as "a difficult time for music and gender identity." In 2014, their first studio album Rcts was released.

In 2016, she released her second studio album, Moves. The tracks on the album were all named after Pokémon moves. One member of the selection committee for the 2017 Korean Music Awards, Jung Goowon, described the album as "the aesthetics of repetition and the thrill of variation," and it won the award for best dance & electronic album. In 2018, she released her third album Sarah, which described the death of an LGBT friend. In 2021, she released her fourth album 4. Yeolshimhi of Music Y described the album's track Stargaze as "the nuances of 90s japanimation and the strange and wonderful coexistence of Japanese electronic band i-dep with the clear attack of Kirara's existing music." Kirara performed with Guinneissik, Net Gala and Liu Lee in December 2021.

Kirara is known for using the catchphrase "키라라는 이쁘고 강합니다. 여러분은 춤을 춥니다. (Kirara is pretty and strong. And you guys are dancing.)". In an interview with Marie Claire Korea in 2022, she stated "This is because my music has formally used the sound of 'strong' drums to make the melody 'pretty'. There is also a reason why I want to send a political message about masculinity and femininity, as I am transgender." But Kirara has also mentioned that she does not know how long to use this catchphrase because she has been doing music for 8 years and now just wants to be Kirara. In December 2022, her live album 4 Live was released.

== Discography ==
=== Studio albums ===
- Rcts (2014)
- Moves (2016)
- Sarah (2018)
- 4 (2021)
- KIRARA (2025)

=== EPs ===
- cts1 (2014)
- cts2 (2014)
- cts3 (2015)
- cts4 (2015)
- cts5 (2017)
- cts6 (2019)
- 4-3 (2021)
- cts7 (2023)
- cts8 (2024)
