= We Like =

Single by Pristin

from the album Schxxl Out
- Released: August 23, 2017
- Recorded: 2017
- Genre: K-pop; dance-pop
- Length: 3:17
- Label: Pledis
- Songwriters: Roa; Sungyeon
- Producers: Park Kitae; Simon Petrén

Pristin singles chronology
"Black Widow" (2017)	"We Like" (2017)

Music video
- "We Like" on YouTube

We Like (stylized as WE LIKE) is a song recorded by South Korean girl group Pristin for their second EP Schxxl Out (2017). It was released as the album's only single on August 23, 2017. An official music video also premiered on the same day. The song was written in part by Sungyeon, a member of the group.

== Background and release ==
After the promotions for their debut mini album Hi! Pristin were wrapped up, the group started working on their next comeback, most likely to happen on the summer of 2017, as confirmed on May 22 by the girls themselves during a Facebook live stream with Idols of Asia, a Chinese entertainment website. A few months later, on August 18, the tracklist for Schxxl Out was revealed, confirming "We Like" as the album's title track. On August 23, the song was released along the album and a proper music video.

== Composition and lyrical interpretation ==
"We Like" is an energetic dance-pop song with dynamic melodies. It was composed by Maja Keuc, Bumzu, Joe Michel, Park Kitae, Simon Petrén and Sungyeon. Lyrically, the song talks about a girl who has a crush on a guy and tries to win him over by highlighting the things that makes her different from the average girls.

== Music video ==
On August 19, the first teaser for the music video of the song was released. A second teaser came out two days later. The full music video, which was also released on August 23, features the girls breaking into a mall and having fun. It ends with them getting caught and then arrested. On August 31, they released a dance version of the music video featuring the full choreography for the song.

== Promotion ==
"We Like" was performed for the first time during a showcase held to promote the mini album on August 23. The following day, on August 24, Pristin made their first comeback stage for the song on Mnet's M Countdown. The promotions continued through KBS's Music Bank on August 25, MBC's Show! Music Core on August 26, SBS's Inkigayo on August 27, SBS MTV's The Show on August 29, and MBC Music's Show Champion's on August 30.

On October 12, it was announced that Kyla would take a break from the group's activities due to health issues. Pristin performed "We Like" without Kyla for the first time on October 14 during the Ansan Friendship Super Show, an event held to celebrate the 25 years of diplomatic relations between South Korea and Vietnam.

== Commercial performance ==
The song entered the Gaon Digital Chart at number 94 on the issue dated between August 20 and August 26, 2017, selling 21,804 downloads in its first week.

== Controversy ==
On August 25, during the performance for "We Like" on Music Bank, a small portion of the lyrics was changed. The original lyrics, sung respectively by members Rena and Yuha, translate to: "I'll pick out what I want to eat, but I'll also take care of the bill. You don't see this often, you'll be more attracted to someone like me.", which stirred criticism for suggesting that it's uncommon to see women paying their own bills. While Rena's verse was kept the same, Yuha's was completely changed as seen in the translation: "After all, I'm the type to be straightforward about what I like and don't like." Their company Pledis Entertainment didn't issue any statements regarding the lyric change, which remained through the rest of the promotions. The dance version of the music video also features the new lyrics, which were re-recorded on studio by Yuha.

== Charts ==
Chart (2017)	Peak position
South Korea (Gaon Digital Chart)	94

== Release history ==
Region	Date	Format	Label	Ref.
South Korea	August 23, 2017	Digital download, streaming	Pledis Entertainment	
Worldwide	August 23, 2017	Digital download, streaming	Pledis Entertainment	
