= Black Widow (Pristin song) =

- Remix version cover

Single by Pristin

from the album Hi! Pristin
- Released: May 19, 2017
- Recorded: 2017
- Genre: K-pop; dance-pop; hip hop; EDM
- Length: 3:13
- Label: Pledis
- Songwriters: Roa; Sungyeon; Simon Petrén; Ylva Dimberg
- Producers: Simon Petrén (album version); Anchor (remix version)

Pristin singles chronology
"Wee Woo" (2017)	"Black Widow" (2017)	"We Like" (2017)

"Black Widow" is a song recorded by South Korean girl group Pristin for their first EP Hi! Pristin (2017). It was remixed and then released as the album's second single on May 19, 2017. The song was written by members Roa and Sungyeon, as well as Simon Petrén and Ylva Dimberg.

== Background and release ==
After the promotions for their debut single "Wee Woo" ended, it was announced, on May 15, that Pristin was going to promote "Black Widow" as a special gift to fans. Days later, on May 19, a remixed version of the song was released on Korean digital retailers. Although it didn't receive a proper music video, a dance practice video featuring the full choreography for the song was released through Pristin's official YouTube channel on May 14.

== Composition ==
"Black Widow" is an uptempo song with trap beats, which showcases Pristin's dark and sexy side. The song was composed by the group's member Rena, along with Simon Petrén, Ylva Dimberg and Jo Michelle. The single version was remixed by Anchor.

== Promotion ==
The album version of "Black Widow" was performed for the first time in a showcase held to promote Hi! Pristin on March 22. During the promotions for their debut single "Wee Woo", Pristin also briefly performed the song on a few selected music shows, including Mnet's M Countdown. After said promotions were wrapped up, the group promoted the remixed version of "Black Widow" for a whole week as the album's second single, which was also labelled as the 'vampire version' by music shows. They started on SBS MTV's The Show on May 16, and continued through MBC Music's Show Champion on May 17, and SBS's Inkigayo on May 21. The song was also performed during the KCON festival in Japan on May 19. Despite the promotions, "Black Widow" failed to enter on music charts.

== Track listing ==
No.	Title	Length
1.	"Black Widow" (remix version)	3:13

== Release history ==
Region	Date	Format	Label	Ref.
South Korea	May 19, 2017	Digital download, streaming	Pledis Entertainment	
Worldwide	May 19, 2017	Digital download, streaming	Pledis Entertainment	
