= Simon Petrén =

Swedish musician

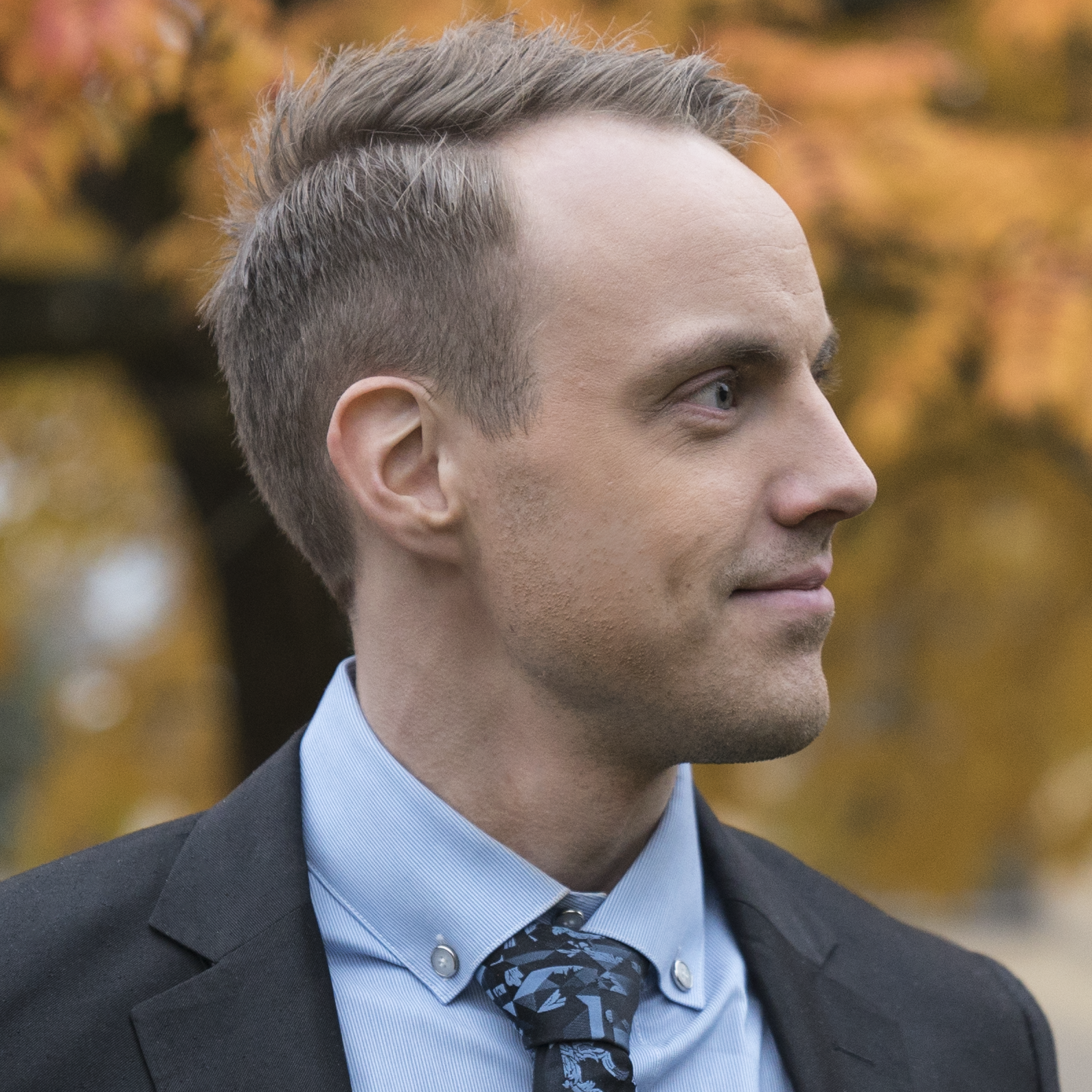

Background information
- Born: 14 March 1986 (age 40)
- Occupations: Producer, Songwriter, Mix Engineer, Mastering Engineer
- Years active: 2007–present

Simon Petrén (born 14 March 1986) is a Swedish music producer, songwriter, mix engineer and mastering engineer. He holds a Diploma in Piano Music Performance at the Royal Schools of Music in London and a Bachelor degree in Film Scoring and Music Production at the Royal College of Music in Stockholm.

Simon Petrén lives in Seoul, South Korea, consulting for different entertainment companies as songwriter/producer/mix&mastering engineer.

Simon Petrén is the producer as well as mix/mastering engineer for the YouTube phenomena Dirty Loops. Their debut album was released by David Foster and Verve Records/Universal Music, USA/Japan (May 19, 2014). As of 2019 they are managed by Quincy Jones.

Simon Petrén is credited with Arranging, Production, Mixing, Mastering as well as the video production of the 2016 version of “Over the Horizon”, the Samsung Galaxy brand sound, coming pre-loaded as mp3 & default ringtone on all of the Galaxy devices.

== Notable writing and production credits ==
Year	Artist	Song	Appearance on album	Songwriter	Producer	Mixing	Mastering
2026	Aespa	"My Plan"	Lemonade	Yes	Yes	-	-
2026	Jaehyun (NCT127)	"99 Degrees"	99 Degrees	Yes	Yes	-	-
2026	Close Your Eyes	"Eternity"	256th Note	Yes	-	-	-
2025	Red Velvet	"Run Devil Run"	2025 SM Town: The Culture, the Future	-	Yes	-	-
2025	Close Your Eyes	"너를 담은 이 영화에 나의 가사가 자막이 돼 (Subtitled)"	Eternalt	Yes	Yes	-	-
2024	D.O.	"Mars"	Blossom	Yes	Yes	-	-
2024	D.O.	"Simple Joys"	Blossom	Yes	Yes	-	-
2023	Riize	"Talk Saxy"	Riizing	-	Keyboards	-	-
2023	NCT 127	"DJ"	Ay-Yo	Yes	Yes	-	-
2023	Lee Jin-ah	"Mystery Village"	Hearts of the City	Yes	Yes	Yes	Yes
2022	Taeyeon	"그런 밤 (Some Nights)"	INVU	Yes	Yes	-	-
2021	NCT 127	"Breakfast"	Sticker	Yes	Yes	-	-
2021	Sam Kim	"The Juice"	The Juice	Yes	Yes	Yes	-
2021	WayV	"Horizon (天空海)"	Kick Back	Yes	Yes	-	-
2021	Dirty Loops & Cory Wong	"Thriller"	Turbo	-	Yes	Yes	Yes
2021	Dirty Loops & Cory Wong	"Follow The Light"	Turbo	-	Yes	Yes	Yes
2020	Seventeen	"Fearless"	Heng:garæ	Yes	Yes	-	-
2020	NCT U	"Dancing In The Rain"	NCT 2020 Resonance Pt. 1	Yes	Yes	-	-
2020	BoA	"Gravity"	Better	Yes	Yes	-	-
2020	Dirty Loops	Rock You	Rock You	-	Yes	Yes	Yes
2020	GFriend	"Secret Diary"	Walpurgis Night	Yes	-	-	-
2020	CNBLUE	"없아 (In Time)"	Re-Code	Yes	Yes	-	-
2020	Lee Jin-ah	"꿈 같은 알람 (Dreamy Alarm)"	Candy Pianist	Yes	Yes	Yes	-
2020	Lee Jin-ah	"나를 막는 벽 (The Wall Blocks Me)"	Candy Pianist	-	Yes	Yes	-
2020	MCND	"쾅쾅쾅 (Bumpin')"	Earth Age	Yes	Yes	-	-
2020	Sohyang	"Stay"	Stay	Yes	Yes	Yes	Yes
2019	Red Velvet	"La Rouge"	The ReVe Festival: Finale	Yes	Yes	Yes	-
2019	Seventeen	"거짓말을 해 (Lie Again)"	An Ode	Yes	Yes	Yes	-
2019	Dirty Loops	"Next To You"	Next To You	-	Yes	Yes	Yes
2019	Dirty Loops	"Work Shit Out"	Work Shit Out	-	Yes	Yes	Yes
2019	Yunho	"Change The World"	True Colors	Yes	Yes	-	-
2019	Yesung	"마음에 그리다 (Branded in My Heart)"	Flower Crew: Joseon Marriage Agency OST	Yes	Yes	-	-
2019	Team Spark	"Joker"	Joker	Yes	Yes	Yes	Yes
2019	Bibi	"Hangang"	The Fan Top 2	Yes	Yes	Yes	Yes
2019	CLC	"Breakdown"	No. 1	Yes	Yes	Yes	-
2019	Summer	"Everything"	GoGo Song OST	Yes	Yes	Yes	-
2019	Gemstone	"너를 만나 (Meeting You)"	너를 만나 (Meeting You)	Yes	Yes	-	-
2019	Kang Min-hyuk	"On The Cheek"	On The Cheek	Yes	Yes	-	-
2018	NCT 127	"나의 모든 순간 (No Longer)"	Regular-Irregular	Yes	Yes	-	-
2018	SHINee	"Retro"	The Story of Light	Yes	Yes	Yes	-
2018	NCT U	"New Dream"	Dokgo Rewind OST	-	Yes	Yes	Yes
2018	Kevin Oh	"How Do I"	How Do I	Yes	Yes	Yes	Yes
2018	K.Will (ft. Hwasa)	"착해지지 마요 (Treat Me Bad)"	Sangsang; Mood Indigo	Yes	Yes	-	-
2018	Lyn	"별처럼 (Like a Star)"	#10	Yes	Yes	-	-
2018	ONF	"나 말고 다 (Incomplete)"	You Complete Me	Yes	Yes	-	-
2018	Babylon	"Heaven"	Caelo	-	-	Yes	-
2018	Babylon (ft. Vinxen)	"One More Night"	Caelo	-	-	Yes	-
2018	Babylon (ft. Verbal Jint, The Quiett, Takeone, Nucksal, Bewhy)	"Karma"	Caelo	-	-	Yes	-
2018	Lucas and Jonah Nilsson (ft. Richard Bona)	"Coffee Break"	SM Station Season 3	-	-	Yes	Yes
2018	Sohyang (ft. JinJoo Lee)	"너의 노래 (The Song Begins)"	The Song Begins	Yes	Yes	Yes	Yes
2017	Taeyeon	"Let It Snow"	This Christmas: Winter Is Coming	Yes	Yes	-	-
2017	Seventeen	"입버릇 (Habit)"	Al1	Yes	Yes	Yes	-
2017	Pristin	"Black Widow"	Hi! Pristin	Yes	Yes	Yes	-
2017	Pristin	"We Like"	Schxxl Out	Yes	Yes	Yes	-
2017	Bumzu	"A.C.C.E.L"	A.C.C.E.L	-	-	Yes	-
2017	NU'EST W	"하루만 (Just One Day)"	W, Here	-	-	Yes	-
2017	Emma Wu	"Knock Knock Knock"	"Knock Knock Knock"	Yes	Yes	Yes	-
2017	Red Velvet	"Would U"	Would U	Yes	-	-	-
2017	Shannon	"Hello"	Hello	Yes	Yes	Yes	-
2017	Rainz	"Juliette (Funky Ver.)"	Sunshine	Yes	Yes	-	-
2017	Lee Jin-ah	"Random"	Random	Yes	Yes	Yes	-
2017	Lee Jin-ah	"계단 (Stairs)"	Random	-	Yes	Yes	-
2017	Lee Jin-ah	"밤, 바다, 여행 (Bye, Bye, Bye)"	Random	-	Yes	Yes	-
2017	Bumzu and Han Dong-geun	"Forever Young"	Forever Young	Yes	Yes	-	-
2017	Car, the Garden	"Dream or Reality"	Live Up to Your Name, Dr. Heo OST Pt. 5	Yes	Yes	-	-
2017	Samuel	"Thousand Times"	Cross OST Pt. 2	Yes	Yes	-	-
2016	Kangta	"말했더라면 (If I Told Ya)"	'Home' Chapter 1	Yes	Yes	Yes	-
2016	SHINee	"한마디 (Beautiful Life)"	1 of 1	Yes	Yes	Yes	-
2016	SHINee	"U Need Me"	1 of 1	Yes	Yes	Yes	-
2016	Onew and Lee Jin-ah	"밤과 별의 노래 (Starry Night)"	SM Station Season 1	Yes	Yes	Yes	-
2016	Red Velvet	"Sunny Afternoon"	Russian Roulette	Yes	Yes	Yes	-
2016	Hey! Say! JUMP	"My Girl"	Dear	Yes	Yes	-	-
2016	Dirty Loops	Over The Horizon 2016	All Samsung Galaxy devices released in 2016	Yes	Yes	Yes	Yes
2016	Lee Dong Woo	Once There Was A Love (사랑이 있었다)	Walking - The 2nd Album	Yes	Yes	Yes	-
2016	Lee Dong Woo	What A Wonderful Cane (톡탁)	Walking - The 2nd Album	Yes	Yes	Yes	-
2016	Lee Dong Woo	Sweet Island	Walking - The 2nd Album	Yes	Yes	Yes	-
2016	Lee Dong Woo	Lonely Night (차가운 밤)	Walking - The 2nd Album	Yes	Yes	Yes	-
2016	Lee Dong Woo	Smiling Face	Walking - The 2nd Album	Yes	Yes	Yes	-
2016	Lee Dong Woo	Cheers To Nothing	Walking - The 2nd Album	Yes	Yes	Yes	-
2016	Lee Dong Woo	Wanna Be Your Guitar	Walking - The 2nd Album	Yes	Yes	Yes	-
2016	Lee Dong Woo	Step It Up	Walking - The 2nd Album	Yes	Yes	Yes	-
2016	Lee Dong Woo	What A Wonderful Cane (English ver.)	Walking - The 2nd Album	Yes	Yes	Yes	-
2015	Girls' Generation-TTS	"Dear Santa"	Dear Santa X-Mas Special	Yes	Yes	Yes	-
2015	Girls' Generation-TTS	"Dear Santa (English ver.)"	Dear Santa X-Mas Special	Yes	Yes	Yes	-
2015	Johnny's West	こんな曲作りました	ラッキィィィィィィィ	Yes	Yes	-	-
2015	Jenny Berggren (Ace of Base)	Come	Så Mycket Bättre 2015	-	Yes	Yes	Yes
2015	Jenny Berggren (Ace of Base)	Push Play	Så Mycket Bättre 2015	-	Yes	Yes	Yes
2015	Jenny Berggren (Ace of Base)	Så skimrande var aldrig havet	Så Mycket Bättre 2015	-	Yes	Yes	Yes
2015	Jenny Berggren (Ace of Base)	Lever så här	Så Mycket Bättre 2015	-	Yes	Yes	Yes
2015	Jenny Berggren (Ace of Base)	Älskar dig till döds	Så Mycket Bättre 2015	-	Yes	Yes	Yes
2015	Jenny Berggren (Ace of Base)	Varje gång jag ser dig	Så Mycket Bättre 2015	-	Yes	Yes	Yes
2015	Dirty Loops	Undo	Undo	-	Yes	Yes	Yes
2014	Dirty Loops	Hit Me	Loopified	-	-	-	Yes
2014	Dirty Loops	Sexy Girls	Loopified	-	Yes	Yes	Yes
2014	Dirty Loops	Sayonara Love	Loopified	-	-	-	Yes
2014	Dirty Loops	Wake Me Up	Loopified	-	Yes	Yes	Yes
2014	Dirty Loops	Die For You	Loopified	-	-	-	Yes
2014	Dirty Loops	It Hurts	Loopified	-	Yes	Yes	Yes
2014	Dirty Loops	Lost In You	Loopified	-	-	-	Yes
2014	Dirty Loops	Take On The World	Loopified	-	-	-	Yes
2014	Dirty Loops	Accidentally In Love	Loopified	-	-	-	Yes
2014	Dirty Loops	The Way She Walks	Loopified	-	Yes	Yes	Yes
2014	Dirty Loops	Crash And Burn Delight	Loopified	-	Yes	Yes	Yes
2014	Dirty Loops	Roller Coaster	Loopified	-	Yes	Yes	Yes
2014	Dirty Loops	Automatic	Loopified	-	-	Yes	Yes
2014	Dirty Loops	Got Me Going	Loopified	-	Yes	Yes	Yes
2014	Dirty Loops	Baby	Loopified	-	-	-	Yes
2014	Dirty Loops	Circus	Loopified	-	-	-	Yes
2014	Dirty Loops	Rolling In The Deep	Loopified	-	-	-	Yes
2014	Dirty Loops	Ta Féte	Loopified	-	Yes	Yes	Yes
2014	Dirty Loops	Just Dance	Loopified	-	-	-	Yes
2014	Dirty Loops	What Makes You Beautiful	Loopified	-	-	-	Yes
2014	Dirty Loops	Where's The Beat	Loopified	-	-	Yes	Yes
2014	Dirty Loops	Afterglow	Loopified	-	Yes	Yes	Yes
2014	Dirty Loops	Forever Young	Loopified	-	Yes	Yes	Yes

Year	Artist	Song	Appearance on album	Songwriter	Producer	Mixing	Mastering
2013	Terese Fredenwall	Midnight Prayer	Breaking the Silence	Yes	Yes	Yes	Yes
2013	Terese Fredenwall	Breaking the Silence	Breaking the Silence	Yes	Yes	Yes	Yes
2013	Terese Fredenwall	I'm Holy Ground	Breaking the Silence	Yes	Yes	Yes	Yes
2013	Terese Fredenwall	Drop the Fight	Breaking the Silence	Yes	Yes	Yes	Yes
2013	Terese Fredenwall	Your Fantasy	Breaking the Silence	-	Yes	Yes	Yes
2013	Terese Fredenwall	As Simple as This	Breaking the Silence	-	Yes	Yes	Yes
2013	Terese Fredenwall	The Others	Breaking the Silence	Yes	Yes	Yes	Yes
2013	Terese Fredenwall	Evelyn	Breaking the Silence	-	Yes	Yes	Yes
2013	Terese Fredenwall	Whiskey and Wine	Breaking the Silence	-	Yes	Yes	Yes
2013	Terese Fredenwall	Something More	Breaking the Silence	-	Yes	Yes	Yes
2013	Terese Fredenwall	Breaking the Silence (feat. Tommy Nilsson)	Breaking the Silence	-	Yes	Yes	Yes

Year	Artist	Song	Appearance on album	Songwriter	Producer	Mixing	Mastering
2011	Jenny Berggren (Ace of Base)	Intro	My Story	Yes	Yes	Yes	Yes
2011	Jenny Berggren (Ace of Base)	Free me	My Story	Yes	Yes	Yes	Yes
2011	Jenny Berggren (Ace of Base)	Living in a Circus	My Story	Yes	Yes	Yes	Yes
2011	Jenny Berggren (Ace of Base)	Spend This Night	My Story	-	Yes	Yes	Yes
2011	Jenny Berggren (Ace of Base)	Dying to Stay Alive	My Story	Yes	Yes	Yes	Yes
2011	Jenny Berggren (Ace of Base)	Numb	My Story	-	Yes	Yes	Yes
2011	Jenny Berggren (Ace of Base)	Gotta Go	My Story	Yes	Yes	Yes	Yes
2011	Jenny Berggren (Ace of Base)	Here I am	My Story	Yes	Yes	Yes	Yes
2011	Jenny Berggren (Ace of Base)	Give me the Faith	My Story	-	Yes	Yes	Yes
2011	Jenny Berggren (Ace of Base)	Beat of my heart	My Story	Yes	Yes	Yes	Yes
2011	Jenny Berggren (Ace of Base)	Air of Love	My Story	-	Yes	Yes	Yes
2011	Jenny Berggren (Ace of Base)	Natural Superstar	My Story	Yes	Yes	Yes	Yes
2011	Jenny Berggren (Ace of Base)	Here I Am (Sthlm Sound Facility Remix)	My Story	Yes	Yes	Yes	Yes
2011	Jenny Berggren (Ace of Base)	Going Home	My Story	-	Yes	Yes	Yes
2011	Terese Fredenwall	You Should Be Your Friend	Not About The Songs	Yes	Yes	Yes	Yes
2011	Terese Fredenwall	To You	Not About The Songs	-	Yes	Yes	Yes
2011	Terese Fredenwall	It's Where You Go	Not About The Songs	-	Yes	Yes	Yes
2011	Terese Fredenwall	Can't Lose You	Not About The Songs	-	Yes	Yes	Yes
2011	Terese Fredenwall	Please forgive Me	Not About The Songs	-	Yes	Yes	Yes
2011	Terese Fredenwall	Not about the Songs	Not About The Songs	-	Yes	Yes	Yes
2011	Terese Fredenwall	Who Can Stop You	Not About The Songs	-	Yes	Yes	Yes
2011	Terese Fredenwall	The Village of Pleasure	Not About The Songs	-	Yes	Yes	Yes
2011	Terese Fredenwall	The Sound of The Dead	Not About The Songs	-	Yes	Yes	Yes
2011	Terese Fredenwall	I'm Not A One Night Project	Not About The Songs	-	Yes	Yes	Yes
2011	Terese Fredenwall	Fire And Delight	Not About The Songs	-	Yes	Yes	Yes
2011	Terese Fredenwall	Lullaby	Not About The Songs	-	Yes	Yes	Yes

Year	Artist	Song	Appearance on album	Songwriter	Producer	Mixing	Mastering
2010	Terese Fredenwall	Säg Bara Mor	Närmare mig	-	Yes	Yes	Yes
2010	Terese Fredenwall	Vackrast För Varann	Närmare mig	-	Yes	Yes	Yes
2010	Terese Fredenwall	Somliga Dagar	Närmare mig	-	Yes	Yes	Yes
2010	Terese Fredenwall	Drömmen Om Att Flytta	Närmare mig	-	Yes	Yes	Yes
2010	Terese Fredenwall	Närmare Mig	Närmare mig	-	Yes	Yes	Yes
2009	Terese Fredenwall	It hurts to be beautiful	Colors From My Heart	-	Yes	-	-
2009	Terese Fredenwall	Like Perfect Art	Colors From My Heart	-	Yes	-	-
2009	Terese Fredenwall	Come	Colors From My Heart	-	Yes	-	-
2009	Terese Fredenwall	Ordinary Day	Colors From My Heart	-	Yes	-	-
2009	Terese Fredenwall	Beautiful Thing	Colors From My Heart	-	Yes	-	-
2009	Terese Fredenwall	Secret Love	Colors From My Heart	-	Yes	-	-
2009	Terese Fredenwall	Stockholm City	Colors From My Heart	-	Yes	-	-
2009	Terese Fredenwall	My Own Way	Colors From My Heart	-	Yes	-	-
2009	Terese Fredenwall	All These Phrases	Colors From My Heart	-	Yes	-	-
2009	Terese Fredenwall	I Wanna Love You So	Colors From My Heart	-	Yes	-	-
2009	Terese Fredenwall	Year of Truth	Colors From My Heart	-	Yes	-	-
2009	Terese Fredenwall	Figure Out This Life	Colors From My Heart	-	Yes	-	-
2007
2007	Danny Saucedo	Stay	Heart Beats	Yes	Yes	Yes	-
