= Hinapia =

South Korean girl group

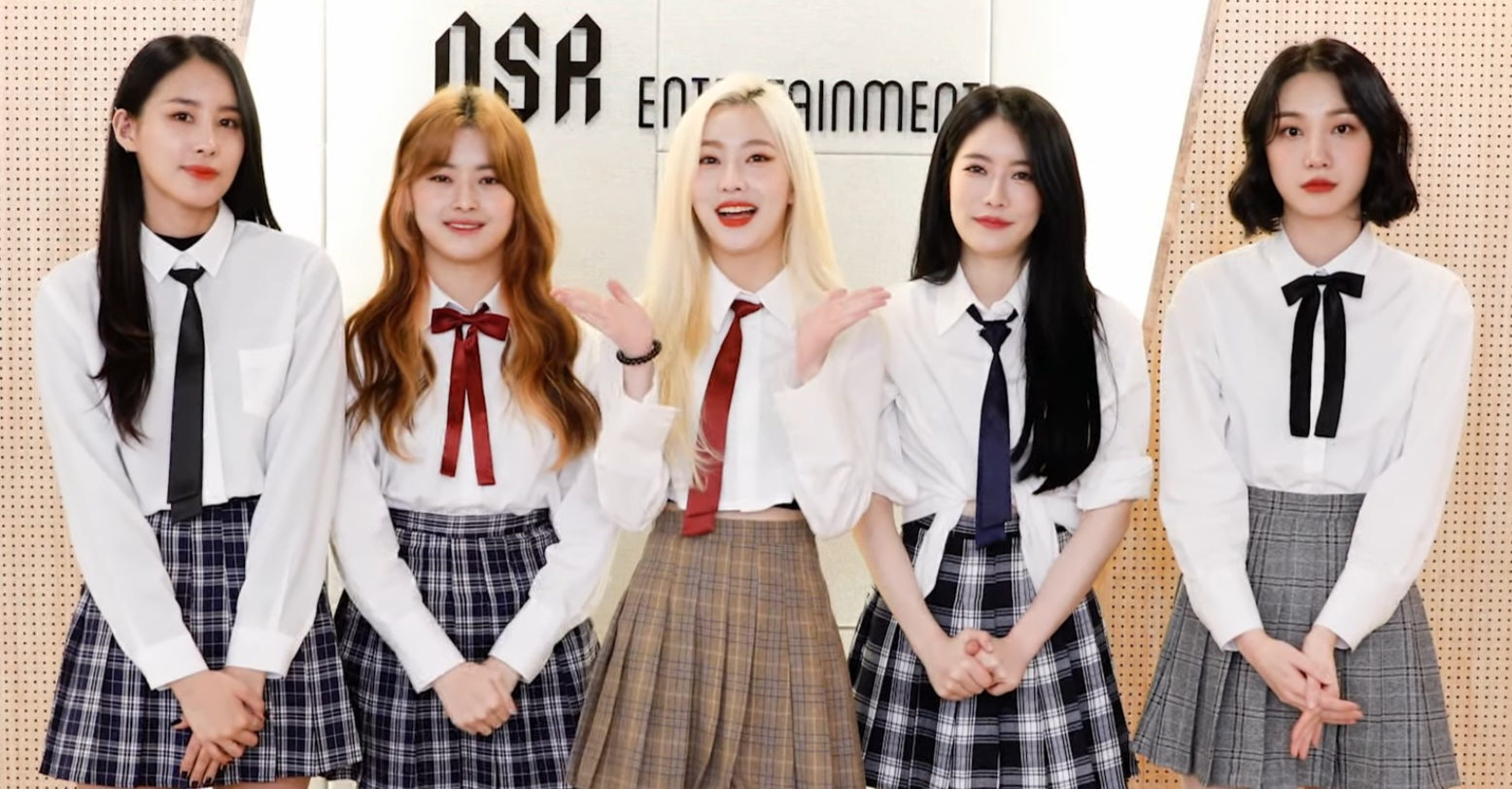
- Hinapia in January 2020; From left: Gyeongwon, Bada, Eunwoo, Yaebin and Minkyeung

Background information
- Origin: Seoul, South Korea
- Genre: K-pop
- Years active: 2019–2020
- Label: OSR Entertainment
- Past members: Minkyeung; Gyeongwon; Eunwoo; Yaebin; Bada

Hinapia (희나피아; stylized as HINAPIA) was a South Korean girl group formed by OSR Entertainment. Its name was an acronym of "Hi New Amazing Utopia". The group consisted of Minkyeung, Gyeongwon, Eunwoo, Yaebin and Bada. Minkyeung, Gyeongwon, Eunwoo and Yaebin had previously been members of Pristin, while Bada was added as a new member.

Hinapia debuted on November 3, 2019, with the single album New Start and its single "Drip". "Drip" peaked at number 18 on the US World Digital Song Sales chart, making Hinapia the eleventh K-pop girl group to enter the chart with its debut single. Billboard subsequently included the group in its list of five new K-pop acts to watch in 2020. The group disbanded on August 21, 2020, after its members and OSR Entertainment mutually agreed to terminate their contracts.

== History ==
=== Pre-debut and formation ===
Minkyeung, Yaebin, Gyeongwon, and Eunwoo previously debuted as members of the girl group Pristin under Pledis Entertainment on March 21, 2017 with the extended play Hi! Pristin. Following their sophomore release titled Schxxl Out and a subgroup named Pristin V, which included Minkyeung, Yaebin, and Eunwoo, the group disbanded on May 24, 2019 after a prolonged hiatus.

During their activities with Pristin, Minkyeung, Yaebin and Gyeongwon performed under the stage names Roa (로아), Rena (레나) and Yuha (유하), respectively.

On October 21, 2019, the aforementioned members were announced to be re-debuting under AlSeulBit Entertainment, which was renamed OSR Entertainment shortly after, alongside an additional member named Bada. On October 24, the name Hinapia was announced, which is an abbreviation of "Hi New Amazing Utopia".

=== 2019: Debut with New Start ===
Before their official debut, Hinapia gave the first performance of their debut single, "Drip", on the October 30, 2019, broadcast of Show Champion. The group officially debuted on November 3 with the release of their first single, New Start, led by "Drip". A press showcase for the release was held at Ilchi Art Hall in Seoul the following day. The group was subsequently nominated for Best Super Rookie at the 2019 K-Champ Awards.

"Drip" debuted at number 18 on the World Digital Song Sales chart dated November 16, making Hinapia the eleventh K-pop girl group to place its debut single on the chart.

=== 2020: Planned comeback and disbandment ===
On February 2, 2020, it had been reported that Hinapia were aiming to release their sophomore album sometime in early 2020, in which the group will showcase "a more mature look than before". However, on August 21, OSR Entertainment announced that the group had disbanded and the members had their contracts terminated.

== Members ==
- Minkyeung (Korean: 민경) — leader
- Gyeongwon (경원)
- Eunwoo (은우)
- Yaebin (예빈)
- Bada (바다)

== Discography ==
=== Singles ===
Title	Year	Peak chart position		Album
Title	Year	KOR	US World	Album
"Drip"	2019	—	18	New Start
"—" denotes releases that did not chart or were not released in that region.

== Filmography ==
=== Reality shows ===
Year	Title	Notes
2019–2020	Hi;Story	8 episodes
2020	H-Log	3 episodes

== Awards and nominations ==
=== K-Champ Awards ===
Bout	Year	Award	Nominee(s)/work(s)	Result	Ref.
1st	2020	Best Super Rookie	Hinapia	Nominated	
