= Shannon Bae =

South Korean musician (born 1999)

Shannon Bae 배성연
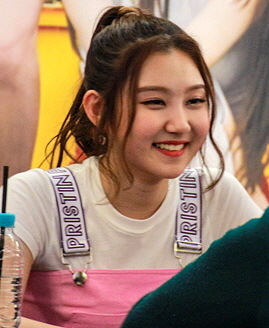
- Bae in 2017

Background information
- Also known as: Sungyeon
- Born: Bae Sung-yeon; May 25, 1999 (age 27); Seoul, South Korea
- Occupations: Singer-songwriter; topliner
- Years active: 2016–present
- Label: Prismfilter Music Group
- Formerly of: Pristin
- Website: prismfilter.com/roster_profile.php?id=65

Korean name
- Hangul: 배성연
- RR: Bae Seongyeon
- MR: Pae Sŏngyŏn

Shannon Bae (Korean: 배성연; born May 25, 1999), also known mononymously as Sungyeon (성연) is a singer-songwriter and topliner based in Seoul, South Korea. She debuted as a member of the girl group Pristin in 2017 and participated in the writing and composition of the group's music. Following Pristin's disbandment in 2019, Bae continued working as a songwriter and producer through Prismfilter Music Group. Her songwriting credits include works for artists such as Seventeen, Kep1er, TWS, Fromis 9, Yena and I-dle.

== Early life and education ==
Bae was born on May 25, 1999, in Seoul, South Korea, and was raised in Los Angeles, California. While living in the United States, her aunt suggested that she audition when she was in the fourth grade. Bae began training with Pledis Entertainment in 2009. For several years, she travelled to South Korea during her summer vacations to train before returning to the United States. Around 2014, she began living in Pledis's trainee accommodation with future Pristin member Kyla while preparing for their debut.

Bae attended Seoul Foreign School. When she first joined Pledis, she went by her English name – Shannon, but after several years as a trainee she chose her Korean given name, Sungyeon, as her stage name for Pristin's debut.

Her interest in songwriting began during elementary school. She recalled writing songs on guitar as gifts for occasions including Parents' Day and her mother's birthday, as well as rewriting lyrics to existing songs. Bae said these experiences gradually developed into an interest in composition.

== Career ==
=== 2016–2019: Pledis Girlz and Pristin ===
In 2016, Bae was introduced as a member of Pledis Girlz, a ten-member pre-debut group formed by Pledis Entertainment. On June 27, the group released the pre-debut single "We"; Bae and Eunwoo composed the song, while Bae also co-wrote its lyrics with Minkyeung, Eunwoo and Xiyeon.

In July 2016, Bae competed on the JTBC vocal competition Girl Spirit as the representative of Pledis Girlz. She was the only contestant whose group had not yet formally debuted.

At Pledis Girlz's final concert on January 6, 2017, the group announced that it would debut under the name Pristin. Pristin debuted on March 21 with the EP Hi! Pristin and its lead single "Wee Woo". Performing under the stage name Sungyeon, Bae participated in both the lyrics and composition of "Wee Woo". She said that the members were not required by Pledis to compose music, but had begun writing songs as their individual musical interests developed.

Bae continued contributing to the group's second EP, Schxxl Out, released on August 23, 2017. She participated in writing and composing the lead single "We Like", as well as other tracks on the album.

On May 24, 2019, Pledis announced the disbandment of Pristin after two years. Of the seven members who ended their contracts with the company, Minkyung, Yaebin, Gyeongwon and Eunwoo later re-debuted as members of Hinapia in November 2019. Bae, Kyulkyung and Yehana remained with Pledis at the time.

=== 2019–present: Songwriting and production ===
Bae had become involved with Prismfilter Music Group during its early years through her work with producer Bumzu, with whom she had collaborated since she was young. Following Pristin's disbandment, her career became increasingly centered on songwriting and music production under the name Shannon Bae. Her early post-Pristin credits included Fromis 9's "Fish" and Jamie's "Apollo 11" featuring Jay Park in 2020; she co-wrote and co-composed the former and co-composed the latter.

In 2022, Bae co-wrote and co-composed Kep1er's debut single "Wa Da Da". She later described the song's success as a turning point in making the public aware that she had continued working in music after Pristin's disbandment. The same year, she co-wrote Seventeen's English-language single "Darl+ing" with Woozi and Bumzu. Bae said that "Darl+ing" was her first time being assigned to write English lyrics for a K-pop song and that the experience subsequently led to work on English-language material for Kino.

Bae has since been credited on songs by artists such as Seventeen, TWS, Fromis 9, H1-Key, Yena, Baekho, I-dle, Verivery and TripleS. In addition to songwriting and toplining, she has worked as a vocal director. For I-dle's 2026 song "Mono" featuring Skaiwater, Bae contributed to the lyrics and composition and also directed the vocals.

Bae has described toplining and lyric writing as the primary focus of her production work. She uses guitar and piano to develop melodic ideas before collaborating with other producers, and has cited Bumzu's willingness to experiment as an influence on her approach to songwriting.

=== 2024–present: Solo music ===
Bae began releasing music under her own name in 2024. Her first solo single, For Your Ex, was released on October 18 through Prismfilter Music Group. The two-track release consists of "Morning Routine" and the title track "이거나 드세요", both of which Bae co-wrote and co-composed.

In a 2026 interview with Allure Korea, Bae said that she had previously made a number of songs for herself but felt apprehensive about officially releasing them, which she attributed in part to the caution she had developed during her years as an idol. She said that her solo work allowed her to approach music more freely and honestly.

On December 21, 2024, she released her second single, "You Too? Me Too!", an R&B song co-written with Hey Farmer and co-composed by Bae, Hey Farmer and Nmore.

== Discography ==
=== Singles ===
Title	Year	Album	Ref.
"이거나 드세요"	2024	For Your Ex	
"You Too? Me Too!"	2024	Non-album single	

=== Other appearances ===
Title	Year	Other artist(s)	Album	Ref.
"백일기도"	2016	Lee Ji-hye, Jang Seok-hyeon and DinDin	Idol Vocal League – Girl Spirit Episode 07	
"Desperado"	2016	—	Idol Vocal League – Girl Spirit Episode 09	

== Songwriting and production credits ==
Credits are adapted from the Korea Music Copyright Association (KOMCA), Bugs! and Prismfilter Music Group unless otherwise noted. A check mark indicates that Bae participated as one of the credited contributors in the listed role and does not indicate sole authorship.

Year	Artist	Song	Album	Lyrics	Composition	Arrangement	Vocal direction	Background vocals
2016	Pledis Girlz	"We"	We	Yes	Yes	—	—	—
2017	Pristin	"Wee Woo"	Hi! Pristin	Yes	Yes	—	—	—
2017	Pristin	"Black Widow"	Hi! Pristin	Yes	—	—	—	—
2017	Pristin	"Running"	Hi! Pristin	Yes	Yes	Yes	—	—
2017	Pristin	"Over n Over"	Hi! Pristin	Yes	—	—	—	—
2017	Pristin	"We Are Pristin"	Schxxl Out	Yes	Yes	—	—	—
2017	Pristin	"We Like"	Schxxl Out	Yes	Yes	—	—	—
2017	Pristin	"너 말야 너"	Schxxl Out	Yes	Yes	—	—	—
2020	Fromis 9	"물고기" (Fish)	My Little Society	Yes	Yes	—	—	—
2020	Jamie (featuring Jay Park)	"Apollo 11"	Apollo 11	—	Yes	—	—	—
2021	Rain (featuring Chungha)	"Why Don't We"	Pieces by Rain	—	Yes	—	—	—
2021	Fromis 9	"Airplane Mode"	9 Way Ticket	—	Yes	—	—	—
2021	Summer Cake	"Love Villain"	Love Villain	Yes	—	—	—	—
2021	Summer Cake	"Move Me"	Love Villain	Yes	Yes	—	—	—
2021	Summer Cake	"Dirty My Clothes"	Dirty My Clothes	Yes	Yes	—	—	Yes
2022	Kep1er	"Wa Da Da"	First Impact	Yes	Yes	—	—	Yes
2022	Woozi	"Ruby"	Ruby	Yes	—	—	—	Yes
2022	Fromis 9	"0g"	Midnight Guest	—	Yes	—	—	—
2022	Summer Cake	"Targetto"	Targetto	Yes	Yes	—	—	—
2022	Summer Cake	"사람들 앞에선 안돼" (Not in Public)	사람들 앞에선 안돼	Yes	Yes	—	—	—
2022	Summer Cake	"Way"	사람들 앞에선 안돼	Yes	—	—	—	—
2022	Summer Cake	"All Eyes on Us"	All Eyes on Us	Yes	—	—	—	—
2022	Summer Cake	"Help" (featuring JERO)	Help	Yes	—	—	—	—
2022	Kep1er	"WA DA DA" (Queendom 2 version)	Queendom 2 Part.1-2	Yes	Yes	—	—	Yes
2022	Seventeen	"Darl+ing"	Face the Sun	Yes	—	—	—	Yes
2022	Seventeen	"Domino"	Face the Sun	—	—	—	—	Yes
2022	Summer Cake	"I'm Done"	Potion	Yes	Yes	—	—	—
2022	JO1	"SuperCali"	Midnight Sun	—	Yes	—	—	—
2022	Chuther	"Believe"	Bad Prosecutor OST Part 7	Yes	Yes	—	—	Yes
2023	TripleS	"The Baddest"	Assemble	Yes	Yes	—	—	Yes
2023	Blitzers	"S.O.D.A."	Peak Time – 3Round <Originals Match>	Yes	—	—	—	—
2023	Seventeen	"F*ck My Life"	FML	—	—	—	—	Yes
2023	Fromis 9	"눈맞춤" (Eye Contact)	Unlock My World	—	Yes	—	—	Yes
2023	Queendom Puzzle	"Rise Up"	Queendom Puzzle Rise Up	—	Yes	—	—	Yes
2023	TripleS	"Enhanced Flower"	EVOLution <⟡>	—	Yes	—	—	—
2023	Seventeen	"SOS" (Prod. Marshmello)	Seventeenth Heaven	Yes	—	—	—	Yes
2024	TWS	"Oh Mymy : 7s"	Sparkling Blue	Yes	Yes	—	—	—
2024	TWS	"BFF"	Sparkling Blue	Yes	—	—	—	—
2024	Seventeen	"MAESTRO"	17 Is Right Here	—	—	—	—	Yes
2024	Kino (featuring Lay Bankz)	"Broke My Heart"	If This Is Love, I Want a Refund	Yes	—	—	—	—
2024	Baekho and BigOne	"Oh My Best Day"	Love or Die	Yes	—	—	—	—
2024	Baekho (featuring Jessi)	"Nutty Nutty"	Nutty Nutty	Yes	—	—	—	—
2024	Kino	"Dancing on the Road"	Dancing on the Road	Yes	Yes	—	—	—
2024	Teo Yoo	"Texas Summer"	Music Adventure by Accident OST, Part 2	Yes	—	—	—	—
2024	QWER	"사랑하자" (Let's Love)	Algorithm's Blossom	—	Yes	—	—	—
2024	Yena	"설탕" (Sugar)	Nemonemo	—	Yes	—	—	—
2024	Seventeen	"Eyes on you"	Spill the Feels	—	—	—	—	Yes
2024	Shannon Bae	"Morning Routine"	For Your Ex	Yes	Yes	—	—	—
2024	Shannon Bae	"이거나 드세요" (Fxck You)	For Your Ex	Yes	Yes	—	—	—
2024	Seventeen	"Love, Money, Fame" (featuring DJ Khaled, English version)	Love, Money, Fame (Remixes)	Yes	—	—	—	—
2024	Shannon Bae	"You Too? Me Too!"	You Too? Me Too!	Yes	Yes	—	—	—
2025	QWER	"Play, We, Dew"	Play, We, Dew	Yes	Yes	—	—	—
2025	LilyPichu, QuarterJade, Yvonnie and OfflineTV	"Never Have I Ever"	Never Have I Ever	Yes	Yes	—	—	—
2025	Seventeen	"Damage" (Hoshi solo, featuring Timbaland)	Happy Burstday	—	—	—	—	Yes
2025	Seventeen	"Shake It Off" (Mingyu solo)	Happy Burstday	Yes	—	—	—	—
2025	Seventeen	"Jungle" (S.Coups solo)	Happy Burstday	—	—	—	—	Yes
2025	QWER	"Overdrive"	난 네 편이야, 온 세상이 불협일지라도	—	Yes	—	—	—
2025	QWER	"행복해져라" (Be Happy)	난 네 편이야, 온 세상이 불협일지라도	Yes	Yes	—	—	—
2025	Hoshi	"I Want You Back"	Non-album single	Yes	Yes	—	—	—
2025	Bangtan Pink (featuring Baekho)	"G.T.A (Good Time Ahead)"	3 in the City	—	Yes	—	—	—
2025	NINA	"어제, 오늘, 내일" (Yesterday, Today, Tomorrow)	Never Afraid	Yes	Yes	—	Yes	—
2025	H1-Key	"내 이름이 바다였으면 해" (Let Me Be Your Sea)	Lovestruck	Yes	Yes	—	Yes	Yes
2025	JAESSBEE	"나의 여름 설명서" (My Summer Manual)	나의 여름 설명서	Yes	Yes	—	—	Yes
2025	Yena	"Drama Queen"	Blooming Wings	Yes	Yes	—	Yes	Yes
2025	Yena	"너만 아니면 돼" (Anyone But You) (featuring Miryo)	Blooming Wings	Yes	Yes	—	Yes	Yes
2025	CxM	"Worth It"	Hype Vibes	—	Yes	—	—	—
2025	CxM	"5, 4, 3 (Pretty Woman)" (featuring Lay Bankz)	Hype Vibes	Yes	—	—	—	Yes
2025	CxM	"Fiesta"	Hype Vibes	—	—	—	—	Yes
2025	CxM	"For you"	Hype Vibes	—	—	—	—	Yes
2025	Hebi	"Wake Slow"	Human Eclipse	Yes	Yes	—	—	—
2025	Jinsoul	"Ring of Chaos"	Ring of Chaos	Yes	Yes	—	Yes	—
2025	Baekho	"Rush"	Rush Mode	Yes	—	—	—	—
2025	Baekho	"My Sign"	Rush Mode	Yes	—	—	—	—
2025	Baekho	"Through the Line" (featuring Camo)	Rush Mode	Yes	—	—	—	—
2025	Yena (featuring Hatsune Miku)	"STAR!"	STAR! (feat. Hatsune Miku)	Yes	Yes	—	—	—
2025	Verivery	"솜사탕 (Blame Us)"	Lost and Found	—	Yes	—	—	—
2026	I-dle (featuring Skaiwater)	"Mono"	Mono	Yes	Yes	—	Yes	Yes
2026	Seventeen	"Tiny Light"	Tiny Light	Yes	—	—	—	—
2026	Yena (featuring Paul Kim)	"물음표" (Question Mark)	Love Catcher	—	Yes	—	—	—
2026	Kangmin	"Intro : small, fragile and still here"	Free Falling	—	Yes	—	—	—
2026	I.O.I	"IF I"	I.O.I: Loop	Yes	Yes	—	—	—
2026	HEART OF WOMAN	"나를 잃지 않는 방법" (Lost in Proof)	Heart Byte : Legacy	Yes	Yes	—	—	—
2026	BoyNextDoor	"Dive"	Home	—	Yes	—	—	—
2026	BoyNextDoor	"Viral"	Home	—	Yes	—	—	—
2026	I-dle	"Gimme Dat Love"	We Made	Yes	—	—	—	Yes
2026	I-dle	"Morning"	We Made	Yes	Yes	—	—	Yes
2026	I-dle	"Crow"	We Made	—	—	—	—	Yes
2026	QWER	"Show Down"	Show Down	—	Yes	—	—	—
2026	QWER	"To Be Continued"	To Be Continued	Yes	—	—	—	—
2026	IRION	"Memoria"	Memoria	Yes	Yes	—	—	—
2026	Nam You Joung	"Prince of the Sea"	Prince of the Sea	—	—	—	—	Yes
2026	MJ	"1~10, 1분 전 (9에서 멈췄어)" (Ghosting)	Right..?	Yes	Yes	—	—	—
2026	Nam You Joung (featuring HUTA)	"Invitation"	Invitation (Feat. HUTA)	—	—	—	—	Yes

== Filmography ==
=== Television shows ===
Year	Title	Role	Notes	Ref.
2016	Girl Spirit	Contestant	Represented Pledis Girlz	
