= Henrik Linder =

Swedish musician

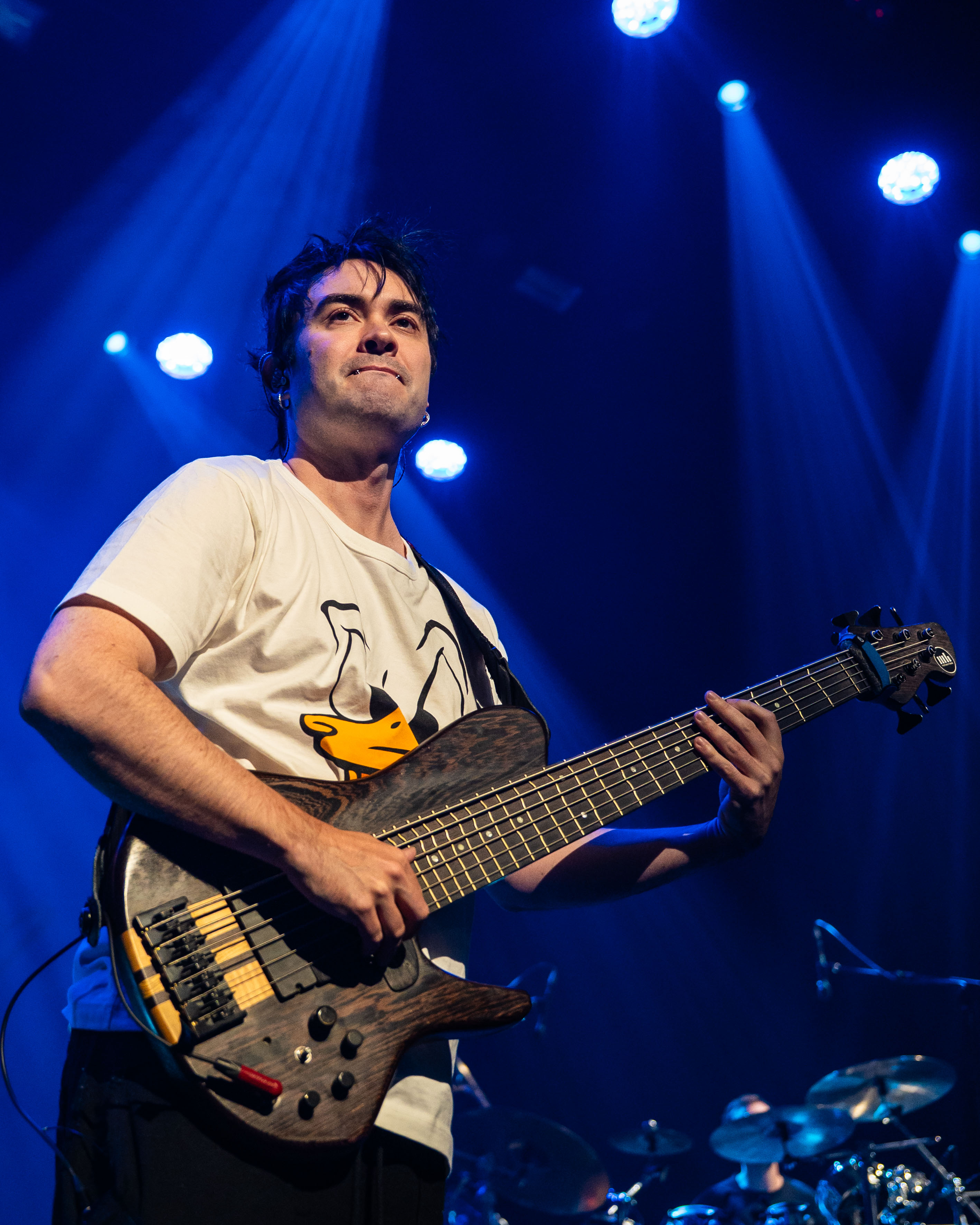
Henrik Linder with Dirty Loops at Kongsberg Jazz Festival, Norway, 2025 Photo: Birgit Fostervold

Henrik Linder (born March 16, 1985) is a Swedish musician and the bass player of the Stockholm-based band Dirty Loops. Linder attended the Royal College of Music where he collaborated with vocalist and pianist Jonah Nilsson along with drummer Aron Mellergårdh. Together, the three of them formed Dirty Loops. Since forming the group, Linder has appeared on the band's debut album Loopified and has toured with artists such as David Foster and Maroon 5.

== Early life ==
Linder was born in Sweden and started playing piano at age 4. Growing up, he listened to music that his older sister listened to, including artists such as Soundgarden since he liked the band's use of odd meters in their songs. When he was around 12 years old, a girl he had a crush on told him that bass was the “sexiest instrument”.

Later on, at 13 years old, Linder switched to bass guitar. One of his first childhood bass idols was Flea from the Red Hot Chili Peppers after listening to the band's song "Aeroplane" from the album One Hot Minute. In addition, Linder later discovered groups like The Brecker Brothers and Tribal Tech, featuring Gary Willis on bass. Gary Willis would become one of his greatest influences. Linder also started taking lessons with a local Swedish bass player, Robert Sundin. At age 16, Linder was already a busy Stockholm session musician and played with many different groups.

Linder attended secondary school at Södra Latin, and afterwards, studied jazz at the Royal College of Music in Stockholm, Sweden. While studying, he collaborated with his childhood friend and drummer Aron Mellergårdh. As classmates at the Royal Academy of Music, they would both practice and jam together as much as possible. Later on, Mellergårdh and Linder started working with another one of their classmates and childhood friends, pianist and vocalist Jonah Nilsson. Their collaboration eventually led to the creation of Dirty Loops in 2008.

== Career ==
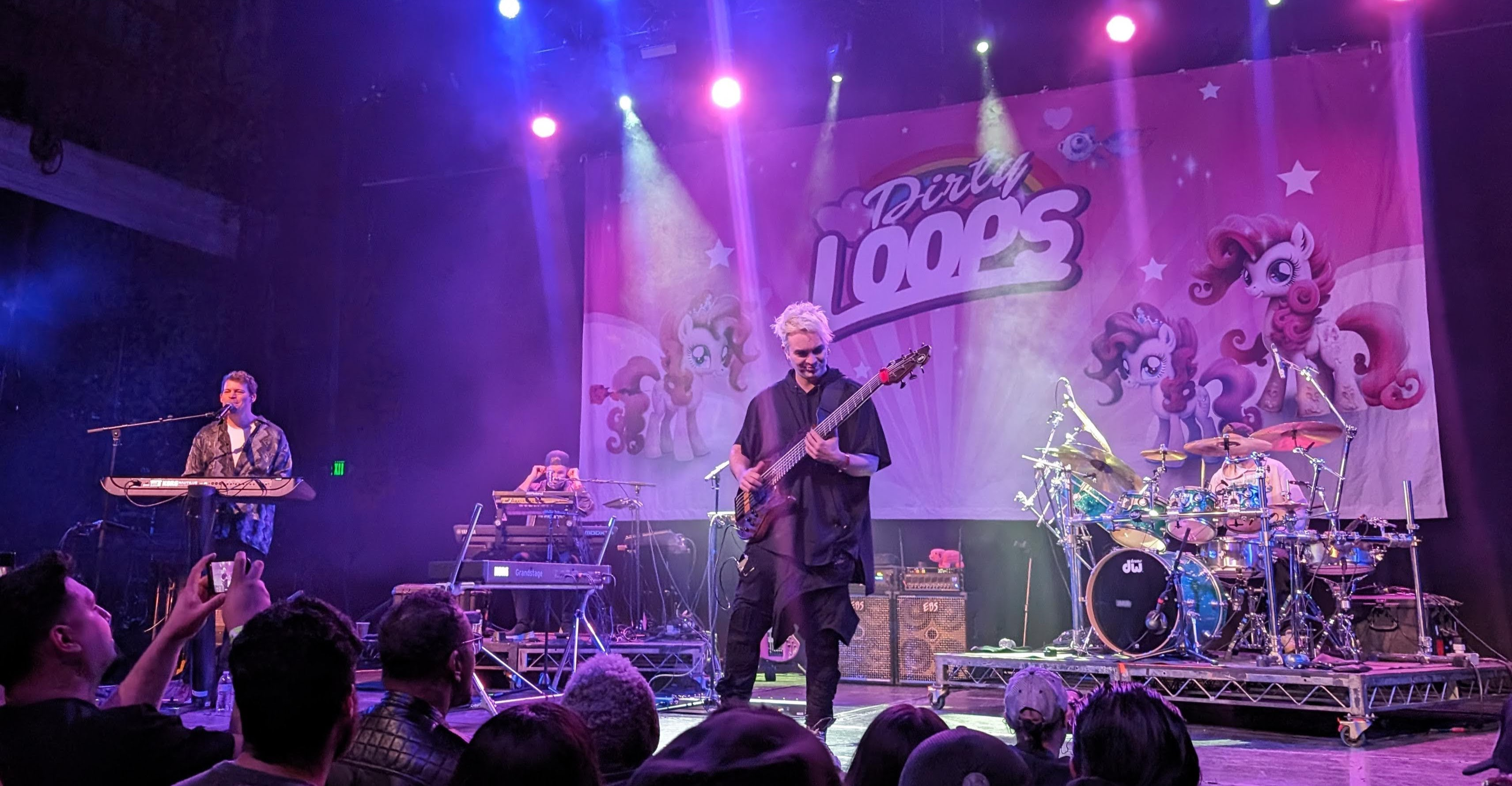
Henrik Linder on stage with Dirty Loops in Los Angeles in April 2024.

After a number of frequent jam sessions, Linder, Mellergårdh, and Nilsson started rearranging and reharmonizing modern pop songs. In 2010, Dirty Loops uploaded their cover of Lady Gaga's song, “Just Dance”, which received over 100,000 YouTube views and 10,000 Facebook shares in the first two months of its release. In 2021, their video has over 19 million views and counting.

After their video was released in 2010, the band continued to release more videos of similar covers such as Justin Bieber's “Baby” and Adele's “Rolling in the Deep”. Linder especially received recognition for his playing on the track “Baby”, which received 125,000 instant views after being uploaded online.

With the continuation of producing videos, many different folks in the industry noticed Dirty Loops’ music. Working in Los Angeles, producer/ songwriter Andreas Carlson signed the band to a management deal. In addition, producer and songwriter David Foster signed Dirty Loops to Verve Records and brought them on his 2012 tour of Asia.

Foster pushed the band to not limit themselves just covering pop songs and strived for them to create their own originals. As a result, Dirty Loops released their debut album Loopified in 2014 under Verve Records. The band's first original song, “Hit Me” appears as the first song on the album and took off in popularity in Japan when released as a single in 2014.

In November 2014, Linder was recognized for his musicianship and won the Young Gun award from Bass Player Magazine at a performance in San Francisco, CA.

In February 2015, Dirty Loops joined Maroon 5 for the tour of their album V. Dirty Loops made their first appearance in Australia and performed in different parts of Asia throughout the tour.

== Playing technique and style ==
Linder is known for using a variety of techniques in his playing. Being in a trio without a guitar player, he uses a variety of chords and inversions to create new harmonic concepts that work with the piano parts and fill in chordal space.

In addition, Linder also works with different slapping and other improvisational techniques in his solos. One concept that he works a lot with is using loops of different grooves and tempos that aren't “In the pocket”. By doing this, it allows him to challenge his weaker playing areas and develop a unique sound. Linder also developed his different techniques by learning bebop heads and Bach Inventions.

Linder is also known for his tone, which comes from his innovation of working around a broken bridge pickup in his Yamaha bass that he has had for 8 years. By doing so, he adjusted to find new ways of getting notes to sound punchy. He also has very light gauge strings and works with the volume of his amplifier to play more dynamically.

== Gear ==
Linder plays two Mattison basses; one six string and one five string for playing slap. He also uses his old Yamaha TRB6P. He uses DR STRINGS Pure Blues on his basses.

For amplifiers, Linder plays three EBS TD 660 heads with six EBS Proline 4x10 cabinets that create a stereo setup.

Linder uses TC electronic pedals.
