= Xiyeon =

South Korean actress (born 2000)

Park Xi-yeon
- 박시연
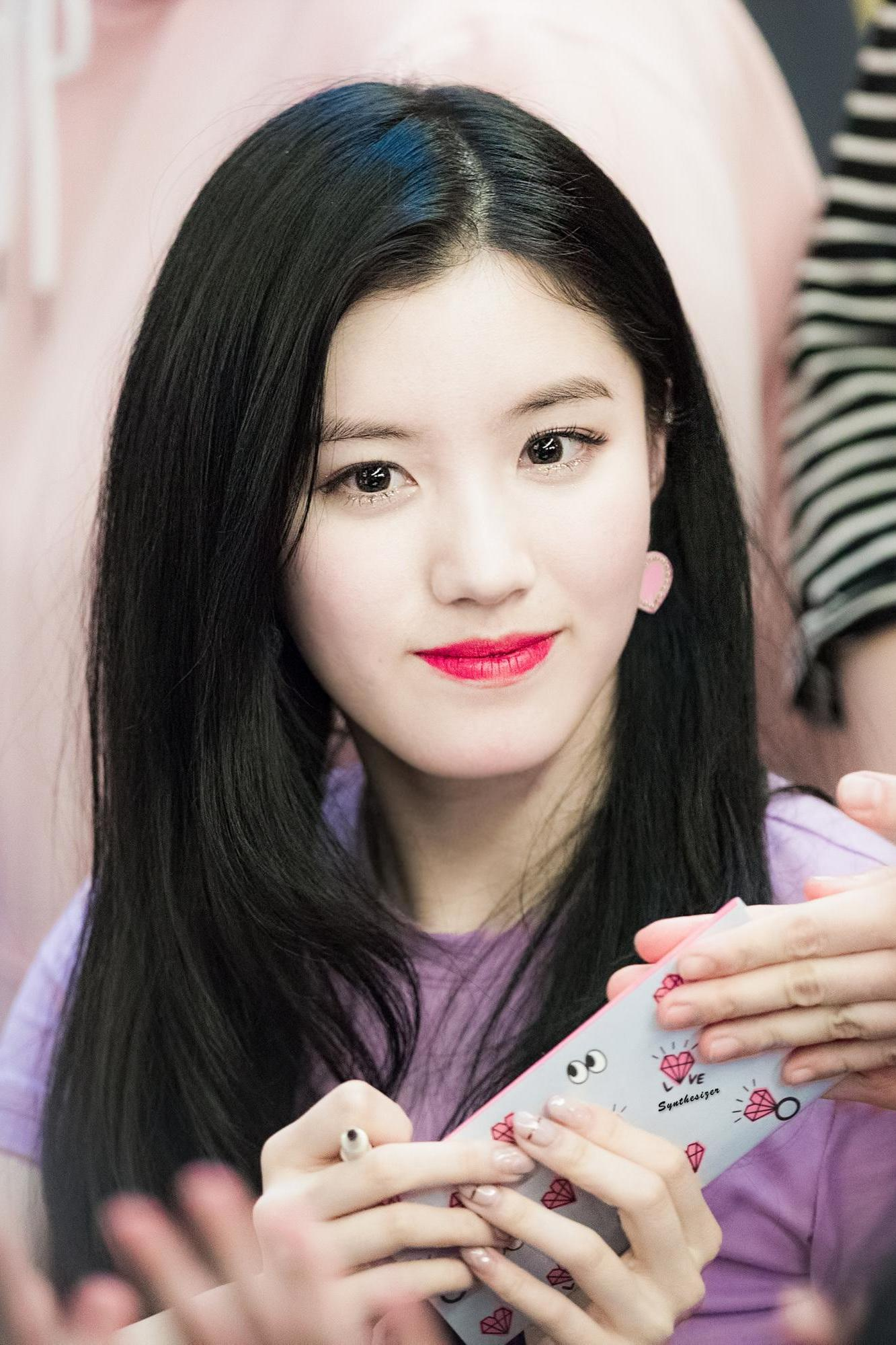
- Park in March 2017
- Born: Park Jung-hyun; November 14, 2000 (age 25); Anyang, South Korea
- Occupation: Actress
- Years active: 2004–2007; 2016–present
- Agent: Saero Actors
- Musical career
- Genre: K-pop
- Instrument: Vocals
- Years active: 2016–2019
- Label: Pledis
- Formerly of: Pristin
- Website: Park Xiyeon

Korean name
- Hangul: 박정현
- Hanja: 朴正炫
- RR: Bak Jeonghyeon
- MR: Pak Chŏnghyŏn

Stage name
- Hangul: 박시연
- Hanja: 朴施妍
- RR: Bak Siyeon
- MR: Pak Siyŏn

Park Jung-hyun (Korean: 박정현, born November 14, 2000), known professionally as Park Xi-yeon, is a South Korean actress. A former child actress, singer and model, she trained under Pledis Entertainment for nine years before making her official debut as a member of the girl group Pristin in 2017. From April 2017 to January 2018, she hosted the South Korean music program Show! Music Core with Cha Eun-woo.

== Early life ==
Xiyeon was born on November 14, 2000, in Anyang, South Korea. As a child, she appeared in several commercials for various companies and products, and most notably, a safety video for Korean Air. She also had small roles in a few dramas and the films, Father and Son: The Story of Mencius (2004) and The Cut (2007). She auditioned for Pledis Entertainment and trained for nine years under the company. As one of their trainees, she was featured in music videos of her label mates such as After School and Orange Caramel.

== Career ==
=== 2016–2019: Produce 101, debut with Pristin, and group disbandment ===
Under the name Park Si-yeon, she, along with six other female trainees of her company, joined the Mnet survival program Produce 101 which aimed to create an eleven-member girl group from a pool of 101 female trainees from various entertainment companies in South Korea that will promote for a year under YMC Entertainment. The show aired from January 22 to April 1, 2016. She failed to make the cut, ranking 25th in the tenth episode of the show.

While Nayoung and Kyulkyung were busy with I.O.I's promotions, Xiyeon and the four eliminated female trainees of Pledis Entertainment with the addition of Sungyeon, Yehana and Kyla, promoted under the pre-debut group Pledis Girlz which Nayoung and Kyulkyung were also a part of. On June 27, 2016, they released the single "We", which she co-wrote with three fellow members, along with an accompanying music video. Xiyeon also performed in weekly concerts with the group from May to September and were joined by Nayoung and Kyulkyung twice, with a final concert on January 6, 2017, just after I.O.I parted ways. During the concert, they announced their group name and eventually made their official debut on March 21, 2017, as a 10-member girl group Pristin by releasing their first EP Hi! Pristin with the lead single "Wee Woo". Xiyeon participated in the production of the album and one of the tracks "Over n Over" was penned by her and five other members.

On April 22, she became the host of the South Korean music program Show! Music Core with Astro member Cha Eun-woo. In August 2017, Pristin released their second extended play Schxxl Out with two songs co-composed by Xiyeon and three with lyrics co-written by her.

On May 24, 2019, Pristin was officially disbanded. Pledis Entertainment announced that Xiyeon would be departing from the label.

=== 2020–present: Transitioning to acting ===
In May 2020, Park announced through her Instagram account that she would continue her career as an actress and was working on an independent film, later titled as Dieter Fighter. Park signed with Soo Yeon Kang Entertainment in July 2020. In July 2021, Dieter Fighter was featured at the 25th Bucheon International Fantastic Film Festival, where Park won the Fantastic Actor Jury's Special Mention Award for her performance.

On November 14, 2023, it was announced that Park had signed a contract with Saero Actors.

== Discography ==
Title	Year	Peak chart positions	Sales	Album
Title	Year	KOR	Sales	Album
"Love Letter" (with Son Dam-bi & After School featuring Ara, Kim Hyelim (Lime) from Hello Venus, Minhyun & Baekho from NU'EST)	2011	4	KOR: 276,337+	Happy Pledis 2nd Album

== Filmography ==
=== Film ===
Year	Title	Role	Notes	Ref.
2004	Father and Son: The Story of Mencius	Heavy fire baby		
2007	The Cut	young Seon-hwa		
2021	Dieter Fighter	So-ra		

=== Television series ===
Year	Title	Role	Notes	Ref.
2010	Creating Destiny	Young Sang-eun		
2021	Dark Hole	Do Ye-ji		
2022	Cheer Up	So-mi		

=== Web series ===
Year	Title	Role	Notes	Ref.
2020	Trap	Kang Eun-ji		
2024	The Bedmate Game: Sharehouse	Na Ju-yeon		

=== Hosting ===
Year	Title	Role	Notes	Ref.
2017–2018	Show! Music Core	Host	with Cha Eun-woo	

=== Television shows ===
Year	Title	Role	Notes	Ref.
2016	Produce 101	Contestant		
2024	King of Mask Singer	Contestant		
