= We (song) =

Promotional single by Pledis Girlz

from the album Hi! Pristin
- Released: June 27, 2016
- Recorded: 2016 (single version); 2017 (album version)
- Genre: K-pop
- Length: 3:54
- Label: Pledis Entertainment
- Songwriters: Roa; Eunwoo; Sungyeon; Xiyeon
- Producers: Kinie.K; Lee Kihyun

Music video
- "We" on YouTube

We (stylized as WE) is a song recorded by South Korean girl group Pristin included on their first mini album Hi! Pristin (2017). It was released as a promotional single under their pre-debut name Pledis Girlz on June 27, 2016, along with a proper music video. The song was entirely written by members Roa, Eunwoo, Sungyeon and Xiyeon.

== Background and release ==
On March 23, 2016, Pledis Entertainment announced they were to debut a new girl group, temporarily called Pledis Girlz. 7 of the 10 members, Eunwoo, Kyulkyung, Nayoung, Rena, Roa, Xiyeon and Yuha, previously competed during the first season of Mnet's survival show Produce 101, where Kyulkyung and Nayoung became finalists and debuted as part of the group I.O.I.

A few months later, the remaining girls released the song "We" as a promotional single to promote the upcoming group on June 27. Due to Kyulkyung and Nayoung still promoting with I.O.I at the time, the single version doesn't feature them. After the group finally debuted as Pristin on March 21, 2017, a new version of the song was included in their first mini album Hi! Pristin containing post recorded vocals by the previously two missing members.

== Composition and lyrical interpretation ==
"We" is a dreamy pop song, which was composed by the group's members Eunwoo and Sungyeon. The album version includes composition by Kinie.K, who also produced the song, along with Lee Kihyun. The song is mainly about friendship and depicts how being together with your friends makes you stronger.

== Music video ==
The official music video was also released on June 26, 2016. It was directed by Jimmy from Brainshock Pictures. Like the single version of the song, members Kyulkyung and Nayoung also don't appear on the video, except from a previously taken picture featuring the full group that can be seen in the beginning. The video was used to introduce the other 8 members' profiles and it shows the girls having fun in a school set.

== Commercial performance ==
Despite being a promotional single, "We" managed to debut at number 113 on the Gaon Digital Chart on the issue dated between June 26 and July 2, 2016, with 19,922 downloads sold, and 332,263 streams.

== Track listing ==
No.	Title	Length
1.	"We"	3:54
2.	"We" (instrumental)	3:54
Total length:		7:48

== Charts ==
Chart (2017)	Peak position
South Korea (Gaon Digital Chart)	113

== Release history ==
Region	Date	Format	Label	Ref.
South Korea	June 27, 2016	Digital download, streaming	Pledis Entertainment	
Worldwide	June 27, 2016	Digital download, streaming	Pledis Entertainment	
