= Starry Night (BoA EP) =

EP by BoA
- Released: December 11, 2019
- Genre: K-pop
- Length: 20:24
- Labels: SM; Dreamus

BoA chronology
Woman (2018)	Starry Night (2019)	Better (2020)

Singles from Starry Night
- 1. "Starry Night" Released: December 11, 2019

Music video
- "Starry Night" on YouTube

Starry Night is the second extended play by South Korean singer BoA. It was released by SM Entertainment and distributed by Dreamus on December 11, 2019. A track of the same name was released as the lead single featuring Crush.

== Release ==
The EP was released on December 11, 2019, through several music portals, including MelOn and Apple Music.

== Commercial performance ==
The album debuted and peaked at number 6 on the Gaon Album Chart for the week ending December 14, 2019. In its second week the album fell to number 46 and in its third week to number 88.

The album sold 8,817 copies in December 2019.

== Track listing ==
Digital download
No.	Title	Lyrics	Music	Arrangement	Length
1.	"Starry Night" (feat. Crush)	BoA; Crush	Lee Jong-hoon; K.imazine; Crush	Lee Jong-hoon; K.imazine	3:30
2.	"Black"	BoA	BoA; Shaun Kim	BoA; Shaun Kim	3:14
3.	"Butterfly"	Jo Yoon-kyung	Tha Aristocrats; Sophia Pae; Dashawn Happie White; Yusuke	Tha Aristocrats	3:33
4.	"I Don't Mind"	JQ; makeumine works	The Stereotypes; Maxx Song; Rodnae "Chikk" Bell	The Stereotypes	3:21
5.	"Think About You" (보여)	Kenzie	Kenzie; Sophia Ayana; Caesar & Loui	Caesar & Loui	3:13
6.	"Dry Flower" (말린 장미)	BoA; Jo Yoon-kyung	BoA; Recep Uenel; Kim Jin-hun	Recep Uenel; Kim Jin-hun	3:33
Total length:					20:24

== Charts ==
Chart (2019)	Peak position
South Korean Albums (Gaon)	6
