= Wee Woo =

Single by Pristin

from the album Hi! Pristin
- Released: March 21, 2017
- Recorded: 2017
- Genre: K-pop; dance-pop
- Length: 3:12
- Label: Pledis
- Songwriters: Sungyeon; Bumzu; Sophia Pae; Gustav Karlstrom
- Producers: Bumzu; Anchor; Park Kitae

Pristin singles chronology
"Wee Woo" (2017)	"Black Widow" (2017)

Music video
- "Wee Woo" on YouTube

"Wee Woo" (stylized as WEE WOO) is the debut single by South Korean girl group Pristin for their first EP Hi! Pristin (2017). It was released as the album's title track on March 21, 2017, and served as the group's debut single. An accompanying music video also premiered on the same day. The song was written by Sungyeon, one of the members from the group, Bumzu, Sophia Pae and Gustav Karlstrom.

== Background and release ==
Pledis Entertainment announced Pristin's highly anticipated debut on March 2, 2017. The cover image for the group's debut mini album was unveiled on March 12, confirming the title track to be called "Wee Woo". The song was released along the album on March 21, with a proper music video.

== Composition and lyrical interpretation ==
"Wee Woo" is described as a soft, lively pop song with a strong beat that showcases Pristin's beauty and energy. The single was composed by the group's member Sungyeon, along with Bumzu, Anchor and Park Kitae. The title of the song is supposed to represent the sound of a siren, an element that is associated in the lyrics as a metaphor to how a girl feels when she's in love.

== Music video ==
The official music video for the song was released on March 21, 2017. It was directed by Kim Yeongjo and Yoo Soongwoo from Naive Creative Production. The video features the girls in different settings of a school and dancing in front of a burger restaurant. In some of the other members' scenes, supernatural activities can be noticed, like Xiyeon's hair being pulled out of thin air, shaking furniture and even an exploding washing machine. On April 5, a dance version of the music video was released featuring the full choreography for the song.

== Promotion ==
Pristin performed "Wee Woo" for the first time on March 21 during Mnet Present's live broadcast, becoming the first rookie girl group to do so with a debut song. The single was also performed on a showcase held to promote the album on March 22. On March 23, the promotional stages for the song started on Mnet's M Countdown. They continued through KBS's Music Bank on March 24, MBC's Show! Music Core on March 25, SBS's Inkigayo on March 26, MBC Music's Show Champion on March 29, and SBS MTV's The Show on April 4. The last stage for the single was held on Inkigayo on May 7. The song was also performed during the KCON festival in Japan on May 19, and on the 2017 Dream Concert at the Seoul World Cup Stadium on June 6.

== Commercial performance ==
"Wee Woo" entered at number 52 on the Gaon Digital Chart during March 19 and March 25, 2017, with 36,390 downloads sold. It peaked at number 49 on the week between March 26 and April 4, 2017. For the month of April, the song appeared on the monthly edition of the Gaon Digital Chart at number 78. By the end of April, the single had sold over 138,000 digital copies and garnered 3,858,260 streams. It also appeared on the Billboard's World Digital Songs at number 11 on April 4.

== Charts ==
=== Weekly charts ===
Chart (2017)	Peak position	Ref.
South Korea (Gaon Digital Chart)	49	
United States (Billboard's World Digital Songs)	11	

=== Monthly charts ===
Chart (2017)	Peak position	Ref.
South Korea (Gaon Digital Chart)	78	

== Release history ==
Region	Date	Format	Label	Ref.
South Korea	March 21, 2017	Digital download, streaming	Pledis Entertainment	
Worldwide	March 21, 2017	Digital download, streaming	Pledis Entertainment	
