= Better (BoA album) =

- Digital and Normal version cover

Studio album by BoA
- Released: December 1, 2020
- Recorded: 2020
- Studios: SM Studios, Seoul
- Genres: R&B; pop
- Length: 37:43
- Language: Korean
- Label: SM

BoA chronology
Starry Night (2019)	Better (2020)	The Greatest (2022)

Singles from Better
- 1. "Better" Released: December 1, 2020

Music video
- "Better" on YouTube

Better is the tenth Korean-language studio album (twentieth overall) by South Korean singer BoA. It was released on December 1, 2020, by SM Entertainment, to commemorate her twentieth anniversary. The album features 11 tracks, with the title song serving as the album's lead single. It was met with praise from music critics upon its release.

== Background and release ==
On November 5, 2020, SM Entertainment announced that BoA will come back with her tenth Korean studio album titled Better, two years after the release of her ninth album Woman (2018). The album release marks the singer's twentieth anniversary since her debut in 2000. Preorders began the same day. A music video teaser for the lead single "Better" was released on November 30. The album was released on December 1, 2020, by SM Entertainment, through various music portals. The accompanying music video for "Better" was released in conjunction with the album's release.

I still can't believe that 20 years have passed since my debut, [...] it feels like people around me are giving more meaning to this than I am. Gearing up for Better, I tried to keep myself more lighthearted because I was afraid I might not be able to drop it now if I also put a lot of meaning into it and made it too weighty.

— BoA on the album and her 20th anniversary, The Korea Times

"Better" is an alternative R&B song written and arranged by longtime collaborator Yoo Young-jin. Alongside music production by Yoo, Aston Rudi, and Jay-Keyz, the song also contains a sample of "Like I Do" by Swedish singer AWA, who was given songwriting credits for the song. A Mandarin version of the song was released in 2022, alongside singer Xin Liu.

The physical album was made available for purchase on December 2, 2020, and has two editions: regular and limited. The limited version was made available in two "special" editions: yellow and beige. A few hours after the album's release, BoA held an online live show titled "Better BoA" which was broadcast through Naver's V Live channel, where she introduced songs from the album.

== Critical reception ==
Better received critical acclaim from critics upon release, with several publications listing Better in their rankings of best albums of 2020. It was ranked at number six on Metro UK's list The 20 Best K-Pop comebacks of 2020 and at number one on Billboard's list of The 10 Best K-pop Albums of 2020. The latter publication described the album as "one of her strongest records to date, and it's filled to the brim with songs that present her as someone assured in her artistry – its excellence is obvious." Rolling Stone (India) included it in their list of the 10 best K-pop albums of 2020.

South China Morning Post named it one of the best K-pop solo albums of 2020 while QQ Music ranked it number 16 on their list of the 100 best K-pop songs of the year. "Start Over" was named the number one Best K-pop B-side of 2020 by MTV, which explained that "BoA's tangy, raspy-edged timbre is a compelling match for the song's pleading urgency and breathless declarations of "You're gonna love me, let me start over."

== Track listing ==
Better track listing
No.	Title	Lyrics	Music	Arrangement	Length
1.	"Better"	Yoo Young-jin	Yoo Young-jin; Aston Rudi; Awa Santesson-Sey; Jay-Keyz	Yoo Young-jin	3:19
2.	"Temptations"	Yubin Hwang	Moonshine; Realmeee; Nicole 'Kole' Cohen	Moonshine	3:15
3.	"Cloud"	BoA	BoA; BXN; Park Seohyun	BXN	3:46
4.	"All That Jazz"	BoA	BoA; Shaun Kim	Shaun Kim	3:58
5.	"L.O.V.E"	BoA	Kenzie; Greg Bonnick; Hayden Chapman	LDN Noise	3:16
6.	"Cut Me Off"	Kenzie	Leon Paul Palmen; Emilie Adams	Palm Trees	3:05
7.	"Got Me Good"	JQ; Park Ji-hee	Moonshine; Matilda Gratte; Linnea Norlen	Moonshine	3:04
8.	"Honey & Diamonds"	Jo Yoon-kyung	OKAY! KENJI; Maxx Song; Krysta Youngs; Julia Ross	OKAY! KENJI	3:54
9.	"Start Over"	Isran	Riley Biederer; Mick Coogan; Rosi Golan; Marcus Andersson	Marcus Andersson	3:08
10.	"Gravity"	Kim Yeon-seo	Simon Petrén; Kim Yeon-seo	Simon Petrén	3:31
11.	"Little Bird"	BoA	BoA; Shaun Kim	Shaun Kim; Brian Cho	3:27
Total length:					37:43

Notes

- "Better" contains a sample of "Like I Do" performed by AWA.

== Charts ==
Chart performance for Better
Chart (2020)	Peak position
South Korean Albums (Gaon)	9

== Sales ==
Sales for Better
Region	Sales
South Korea (Gaon)	17,371
