= Pristin =

South Korean girl group

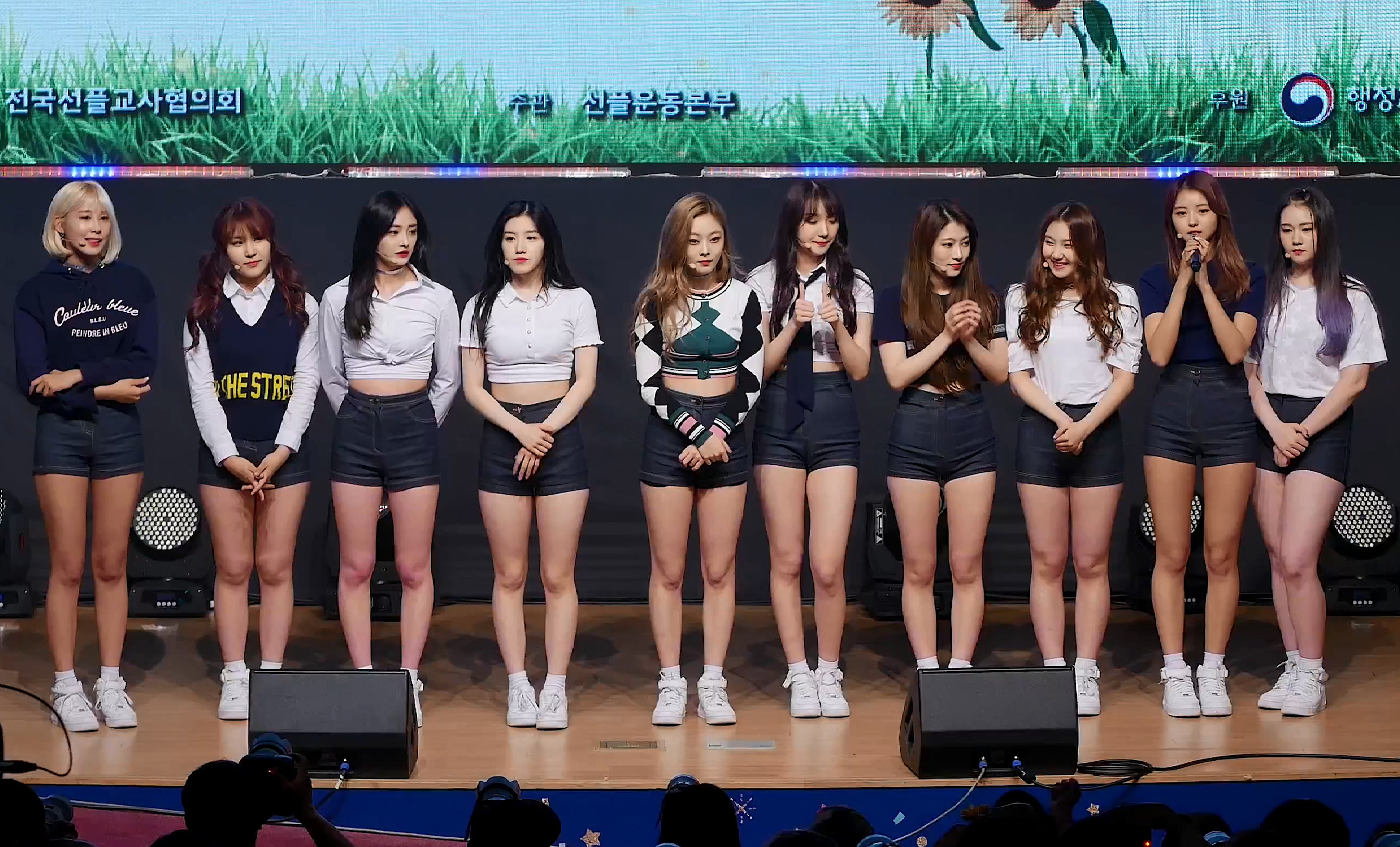
- Pristin in 2017; From left to the right: Yuha, Yehana, Kyulkyung, Xiyeon, Eunwoo, Roa, Rena, Sungyeon, Nayoung, and Kyla

Background information
- Also known as: Pledis Girlz
- Origin: Seoul, South Korea
- Genre: K-pop
- Years active: 2016–2018
- Label: Pledis
- Spinoffs: Pristin V
- Past members: Nayoung; Roa; Yuha; Eunwoo; Rena; Kyulkyung; Yehana; Sungyeon; Xiyeon; Kyla
- Website: Official Website

Pristin (Korean: 프리스틴; stylized in all caps, and pre-debut name Pledis Girlz) was a South Korean girl group formed by Pledis Entertainment in 2016. The group was composed of ten members: Nayoung, Roa, Yuha, Eunwoo, Rena, Kyulkyung, Yehana, Sungyeon, Xiyeon, and Kyla. Most of them appeared on the television show Produce 101 and, as the prize for becoming two of the top contestants, Nayoung and Kyulkyung went on to debut as part of the project girl group I.O.I, before reuniting with the other members to debut as Pristin on March 21, 2017, with the first EP Hi! Pristin. Pristin was known for writing and composing their own music. After nearly a year and a half with little activity, the group disbanded on May 24, 2019 when only 3 of the 10 members renewed their contract with Pledis Entertainment.

== History ==
=== Pre-debut ===
The members Nayoung, Roa, Yuha, Eunwoo, Rena, Kyulkyung and Xiyeon competed together on Mnet's survival television show Produce 101, which aired from January 22 to April 1, 2016. While five of the members were eliminated, Nayoung and Kyulkyung became part of the final line-up for the project girl group I.O.I, which made its debut on May 4 with the single "Dream Girls".

==== Pledis Girlz ====
The group was officially announced as Pledis Girlz by Pledis Entertainment on March 23, 2016. On the same day, Eunwoo was featured on the song "Sickness" by Seventeen's Vernon as part of the soundtrack for the webtoon Love Revolution. Pledis Girlz held concerts from May 14 to September 10, 2016, in which the members performed weekly, with the exception of Nayoung and Kyulkyung, who only performed certain concerts due to having been promoting with I.O.I at the time.

On June 27, they released the promotional single "We", which was written by Roa, Eunwoo, Sungyeon and Xiyeon. The music video for the song was used to introduce the members' profiles.

They held their last concert as Pledis Girlz, entitled Bye & Hi, on January 6, 2017, and then renamed to Pristin, a portmanteau of the words "prismatic" (bright and clear) and "elastin" (flawless strength).

=== 2017–2018: Debut, moderate success and Pristin V debut ===
On March 2, 2017, Pledis Entertainment announced the group's debut through a teaser image. On March 21, Pristin debuted and released their first mini album Hi! Pristin, accompanied by the title track "Wee Woo". They became the first rookie girl group to perform their debut song on a live broadcast during Mnet Present. Pristin was also part of the line-up for the KCON festival held in Japan on May 19. On the same day, a remixed version of "Black Widow" was released as the album's second and final single, which was performed on a few music shows in order to conclude Hi Pristin's promotions.

On June 3, they performed at the 2017 Dream Concert at the Seoul World Cup Stadium. Their second mini album Schxxl Out was released on August 23, along with the single "We Like".

On October 12, it was announced that the youngest member Kyla would take a break from the group's activities due to health issues. She returned temporarily to the United States to focus on her recovery.

On May 8, 2018, it was announced that Pristin would be debuting a sub-unit called Pristin V, consisting of members Nayoung, Roa, Eunwoo, Rena and Kyulkyung. Pristin V made their debut on May 28, 2018 with single album Like A V.

=== 2019: Disbandment ===
Following the debut of sub-unit Pristin V, Pristin remained inactive as a full group. By May 2019, nearly two years had passed since the release of their second EP, Schxxl Out, while their only release during 2018 had been Pristin V's single album Like a V. During the inactivity, fans repeatedly requested information from Pledis Entertainment about the group's future activities.

On May 24, Pledis announced that Pristin had disbanded following lengthy discussions with the members. The exclusive contracts of Nayoung, Roa, Yuha, Eunwoo, Rena, Xiyeon and Kyla ended that day, while Kyulkyung, Yehana and Sungyeon remained with the agency. Pledis stated that it would support the three remaining members in pursuing individual activities.

On November 3, former members Roa, Yuha, Eunwoo and Rena—using the names Minkyeung, Gyeongwon, Eunwoo and Yaebin, respectively—re-debuted as members of Hinapia alongside Bada under OSR Entertainment. The group debuted with the single album New Start. Despite prospects of a second release, Hinapia disbanded on August 21, 2020.

== Members ==
- Nayoung (Korean: 나영) — leader
- Roa (로아)
- Yuha (유하)
- Eunwoo (은우)
- Rena (레나)
- Kyulkyung (결경)
- Yehana (예하나)
- Sungyeon (성연)
- Xiyeon (시연)
- Kyla (카일라)

=== Sub-units ===
- Pristin V (Korean: 프리스틴 V) – Nayoung, Roa, Eunwoo, Rena, Kyulkyung

== Discography ==
=== Extended plays ===
Title	Details	Peak positions		Sales
Title	Details	KOR	US World	Sales
Hi! Pristin	Released: March 21, 2017; Label: Pledis Entertainment, LOEN Entertainment; Formats: CD, digital download	4	10	KOR: 43,300; JPN: 1,145
Schxxl Out	Released: August 23, 2017; Label: Pledis Entertainment, LOEN Entertainment; Formats: CD, digital download	4	5	KOR: 27,276; JPN: 952

=== Singles ===
Title	Year	Peak positions		Sales	Album
Title	Year	KOR	US World	Sales	Album
"Wee Woo"	2017	49	11	KOR: 157,728	Hi! Pristin
"Black Widow"	2017	—	—	—N/a	Hi! Pristin
"We Like"	2017	94	—	KOR: 21,804	Schxxl Out
"—" denotes items that did not chart or were not released in that area.

=== Promotional singles ===
Title	Year	Peak positions	Sales	Album
Title	Year	KOR	Sales	Album
"We" (Note: "We" was a promotional digital single released under Pristin's pre-debut name Pledis Girlz without Kyulkyung and Nayoung.)	2016	113	KOR: 19,922	Hi! Pristin

== Filmography ==
=== Music videos ===
Year	Title	Director(s)	Ref.
2016	"We" (Note: Released as Pledis Girlz.)	Jimmy (Brainshock Pictures)	
2017	"Wee Woo"	Kim Young-jo & Yoo Seung-woo (Naive Creative)	
2017	"We Like"	Kim Young-jo & Yoo Seung-woo (Naive Creative)	

== Concerts ==
=== Pledis Girlz Concert (2016) ===
Pledis Girlz held regular Saturday concerts from May 14 to September 10, 2016.

No.	Date	Member day	Special guest(s)	Ref.
01	May 14	Rena	None	
02	May 21	Xiyeon	None	
03	May 28	Sungyeon	None	
04	June 4	Eunwoo	None	
05	June 11	Yehana	None	
06	June 18	Kyla	None	
07	June 25	Yuha	None	
08	July 2	Roa	None	
09	July 23	Sungyeon	None	
10	July 30	Xiyeon	Hwang In-sun	
11	August 6	Yehana	Park So-yeon	
12	August 13	Eunwoo	D.A.L (Kim Woo-jung); Kim Da-jung; Kim Ji-sung	
13	August 20	Kyla	An Ye-seul	
14	August 27	Rena	Yoon Seo-hyung	
15	September 3	Yuha	I.O.I	
16	September 10	Roa	Han Dong-geun	

== Awards and nominations ==
Name of the award ceremony, year presented, award category, nominee(s) of the award, and the result of the nomination
Award ceremony	Year	Category	Nominee / Work	Result	Ref.
Asia Artist Awards	2017	Rookie Award	Pristin	Won	
Asia Artist Awards	2017	Popularity Award	Pristin	Nominated	
Asia Artist Awards	2018	Popularity Award	Pristin	Nominated	
Gaon Chart Music Awards	2018	New Artist of the Year (Song)	"Wee Woo"	Nominated	
Golden Disc Awards	2018	New Artist of the Year	Pristin	Nominated	
Golden Disc Awards	2018	Global Popularity Award	Pristin	Nominated	
Melon Music Awards	2017	Best New Artist	Pristin	Nominated	
Mnet Asian Music Awards	2017	Best New Female Artist	Pristin	Won	
Mnet Asian Music Awards	2017	Artist of the Year	Pristin	Nominated	
Seoul Music Awards	2018	New Artist Award	Pristin	Won	
Seoul Music Awards	2018	Popularity Award	Pristin	Nominated	
Seoul Music Awards	2018	Hallyu Special Award	Pristin	Nominated	
V Live Awards	2018	Global Rookie Top 5	Pristin	Won	
