= Pristin V =

South Korean girl group

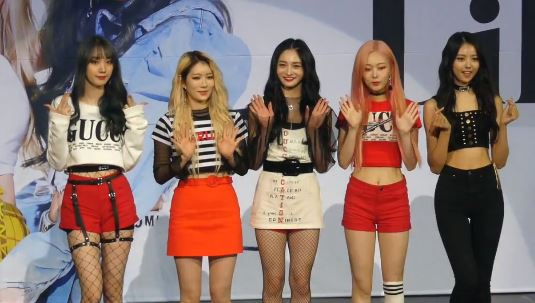
- Pristin V in May 2018

Background information
- Origin: Seoul, South Korea
- Genres: K-pop; R&B
- Years active: 2018
- Label: Pledis
- Spinoff of: Pristin
- Past members: Nayoung; Roa; Eunwoo; Rena; Kyulkyung
- Website: Official website

Pristin V (Korean: 프리스틴 V) was a sub-group of South Korean girl group Pristin, formed by Pledis Entertainment in 2018. It was composed of five Pristin members: Nayoung, Roa, Eunwoo, Rena, and Kyulkyung. Following its group disbandment, the sub-unit also announced the official disbandment.

== History ==
=== 2018: Debut with Like a V ===
On May 17, Pledis Entertainment released a teaser confirming that Pristin would be debuting its first sub-unit. Soon after both individual and group teasers began to be released, along with the title of their debut single album Like a V. On May 28, their first single album was released, along with the music video of the leading track in the album, "Get It".

== Members ==
- Nayoung (Korean: 나영)
- Roa (로아)
- Eunwoo (은우)
- Rena (레나)
- Kyulkyung (결경)

== Discography ==
=== Single albums ===
Title	Details	Peak positions		Sales
Title	Details	KOR	TW	Sales
Like a V	Released: May 28, 2018; Label: Pledis Entertainment, Kakao M; Formats: CD, digital download; Track listing: 1. "Get It" (네 멋대로); 2. "Spotlight"	5	18	KOR: 18,301+

=== Singles ===
Title	Year	Peak positions		Album
Title	Year	KOR DL	US World	Album
"Get It" (네 멋대로)	2018	66	6	Like a V

=== Other charted songs ===
Title	Year	Peak positions	Album
Title	Year	US World	Album
"Spotlight"	2018	19	Like a V

== Filmography ==
=== Music videos ===
Year	Title	Director(s)	Ref.
2018	"Get It" (네 멋대로)	Beomjin (VM Project Architecture)	
2018	"Spotlight" (Special Video)	Jaehyun Ahn (METAOLOZ)	
