= Dirty Loops =

Swedish funk band

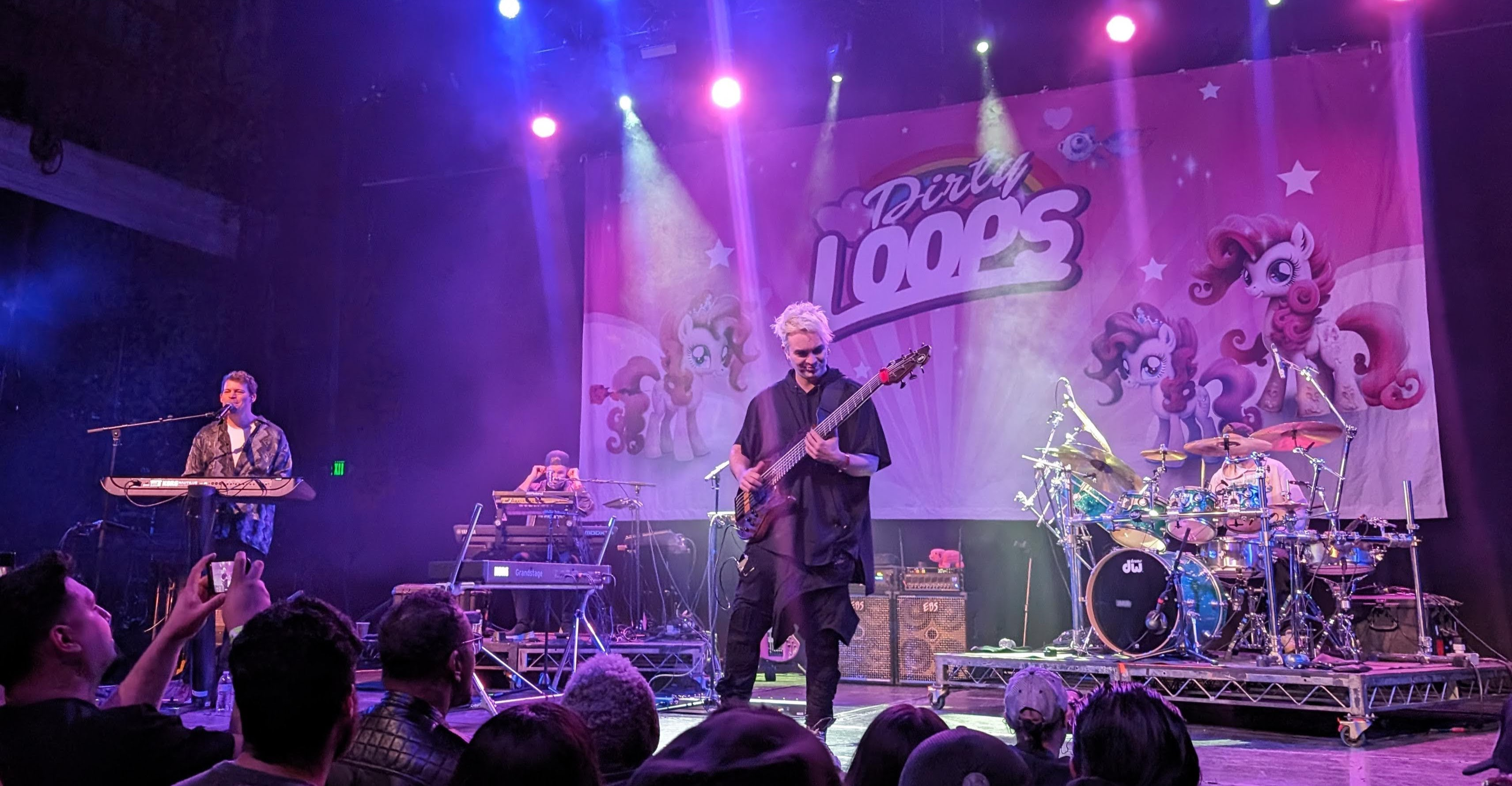
- Dirty Loops performing in 2024

Background information
- Origin: Stockholm, Sweden
- Genres: Jazz fusion, funk, pop, disco
- Years active: 2008–present
- Labels: Verve, Universal Music
- Members: Jonah Nilsson; Henrik Linder; Aron Mellergård
- Website: http://www.dirty-loops.com

Dirty Loops is a band from Stockholm, Sweden, made up of Jonah Nilsson (keyboards and lead vocals), Henrik Linder (bass and backing vocals) and Aron Mellergård (drums and backing vocals). Their arrangements borrow from jazz and jazz fusion, gospel, funk, electronica, pop, and disco. They are known for their jazz fusion reharmonized covers of pop songs like "Baby" by Justin Bieber, "Rolling in the Deep" by Adele, ''Just Dance'' by Lady Gaga, and "Wake Me Up" by Avicii. They also performed the 2016 rendition of the song "Over the Horizon" for the Samsung Galaxy S7/S7Edge by Samsung Electronics.

== Background ==
Jonah and Henrik were childhood friends and met Aron when all three of the band's members studied music at Södra Latin together.

After upper secondary school, they attended the Royal College of Music in Stockholm together. Nilsson studied classical theory while Linder and Mellergård studied jazz. Jonah Nilsson has also studied music at Betel College in Stockholm. Henrik Linder attended Adolf Fredrik Music School as a child.

Henrik Linder began his music career as a pianist at the age of four and bass at the age of 13.

Jonah Nilsson also started singing as a child, and his parents sang in the choir of Katarina Church, Stockholm. At the age of 11, he began playing piano. He appeared as a backing singer and played piano on Danny Saucedo's tour in 2005, the same year that Danny made his debut on the TV show Swedish Idol.

== History ==
The band was formed in 2008 and released their first song in 2010. In February 2011, they signed a management contract with producer and songwriter Andreas Carlsson. On September 3, 2011, the band backed Danny Saucedo at the Aftonbladet music gala, "Rockbjörnen".

Manager Andreas Carlsson has prioritised developing the band's brand. Above all, he has advised them to be careful about what they upload and publish on the Internet. They have appeared in several television interviews, and in 2015, they appeared as middle act in the Swedish Melodifestivalen, where they performed the 2014 winning song "Undo" by artist Sanna Nielsen. Carlsson also helped the band to get a global record deal. In 2012, the band traveled to the U.S. to face several major music profiles, among others, singer Brian McKnight, drummer Simon Phillips and bassist Nathan East. Eventually, they signed a record contract with producer and record label director David Foster and Universal Music subsidiary Verve.

=== Debut album: Loopified ===
Their debut album, Loopified was released on 16 April 2014, in Japan, on May 19 in the UK, and on 19 August in the US.

=== Hiatus and Phoenix ===
Citing creative differences during the early production of their second album, the group announced that they would go on hiatus and pursue individual interests. On 26 December 2018, they posted on their Instagram hinting towards the completion of their second album, marking the end of their hiatus. The first single off of their second album was released on 20 May 2019.

=== Turbo (2021-present) ===
On 19 August 2021, Cory Wong and Dirty Loops released a single entitled "Follow the Light." On 26 August they released their second single "Ring of Saturn." It is off the collaborative album Turbo which was released on 3 September.

== Tours ==
=== David Foster and Andreas Carlsson ===
In late 2012, the band supported David Foster and Andreas Carlsson in Japan, China, Indonesia, Singapore, and Thailand for the "David Foster & Friends Tour."

=== Maroon V Tour ===
The band opened for Maroon 5 during the Asia and Oceania legs of the Maroon V Tour in support of their fifth album V. The tour was announced on 2 September 2014 and began on 16 February 2015. The tour took place in North America, Europe, Africa, Asia and Oceania until October 2015.

List of concerts, showing date, city, country, venue, opening act, tickets sold, number of available tickets and amount of gross revenue
Date	City	Country	Venue	Opening act	Attendance	Revenue
Leg 6 — Asia
1 September 2015	Osaka	Japan	Osaka-jō Hall	Dirty Loops	—	—
2 September 2015	Tokyo	Japan	Yokohama Arena	Dirty Loops	—	—
4 September 2015	Hong Kong	China	AsiaWorld Arena	Dirty Loops	—	—
6 September 2015	Daegu	South Korea	Daegu Stadium	Dirty Loops	—	—
7 September 2015	Seoul	South Korea	Olympic Gymnastics Arena	Dirty Loops	—	—
14 September 2015	Taipei	Taiwan	Nangang Hall	Dirty Loops	—	—
17 September 2015	Manila	Philippines	Mall of Asia Arena	Dirty Loops	—	—
19 September 2015 (Note: The September 19, 2015, concert in Singapore at Marina Bay Street Circuit was part of Singapore Grand Prix Concert.)	Singapore	Singapore	Marina Bay Street Circuit	—N/a	—	—
21 September 2015	Bangkok	Thailand	Impact Arena	Dirty Loops	—	—
22 September 2015	Bangkok	Thailand	Impact Arena	Dirty Loops	—	—
Leg 7 — Oceania
26 September 2015	Melbourne	Australia	Rod Laver Arena	Dirty Loops	—	—
28 September 2015	Brisbane	Australia	Brisbane Entertainment Centre	Dirty Loops	—	—
29 September 2015	Sydney	Australia	Allphones Arena	Dirty Loops	—	—
3 October 2015	Christchurch	New Zealand	Horncastle Arena	Dirty Loops	—	—
3 October 2015	Auckland	New Zealand	Vector Arena	Dirty Loops	—	—

== Members ==
=== Jonah Nilsson – vocals & keyboards ===
Jonah's musical journey began when he sang in the choir at the Katarina Church in Stockholm, conducted by his parents at age one. He also started learning the double bass at age eight, but quickly made a switch to piano lessons in classical music at age 11, inspired by one of his favorite Chopin pieces, Fantasie Impromptu in C sharp minor. In his final year at high school, he switched over to jazz piano studies. He attended various music schools including Sodra Latin, Adolf Fredrik School of Music, Betel College and the Royal Music Academy in Stockholm.

At age 17, he collaborated with Arvid Svenungsson to produce a biblical-based musical centered on the character Job. He met Aron Mellergård and wrote songs together in the vein of groovy funk, inspired by music of the 80's and bands like Toto. Later, he joined Danny Saucedo's tour as backing vocals and keyboardist.

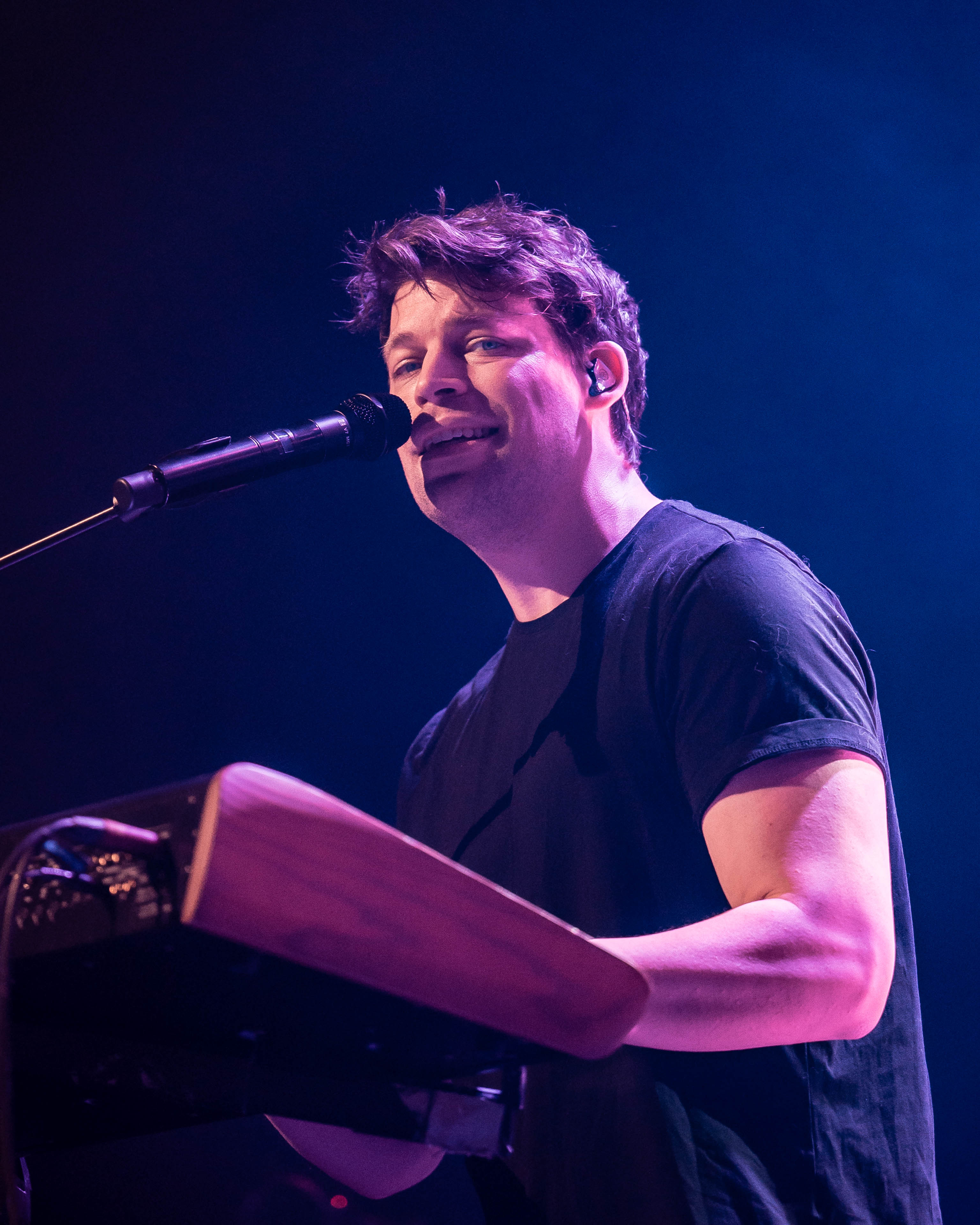
Jonah Nilsson (2025)

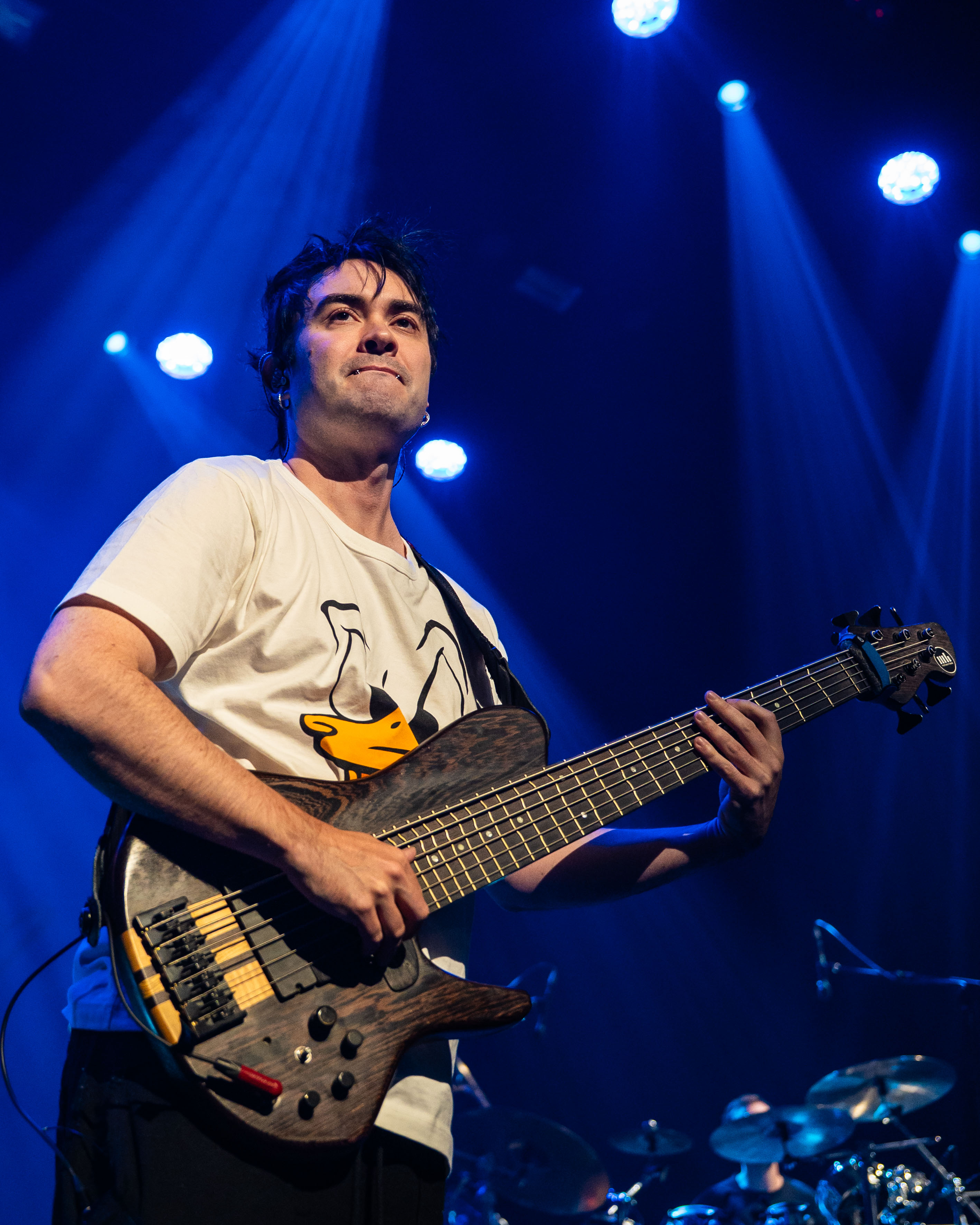
Henrik Linder (2025)

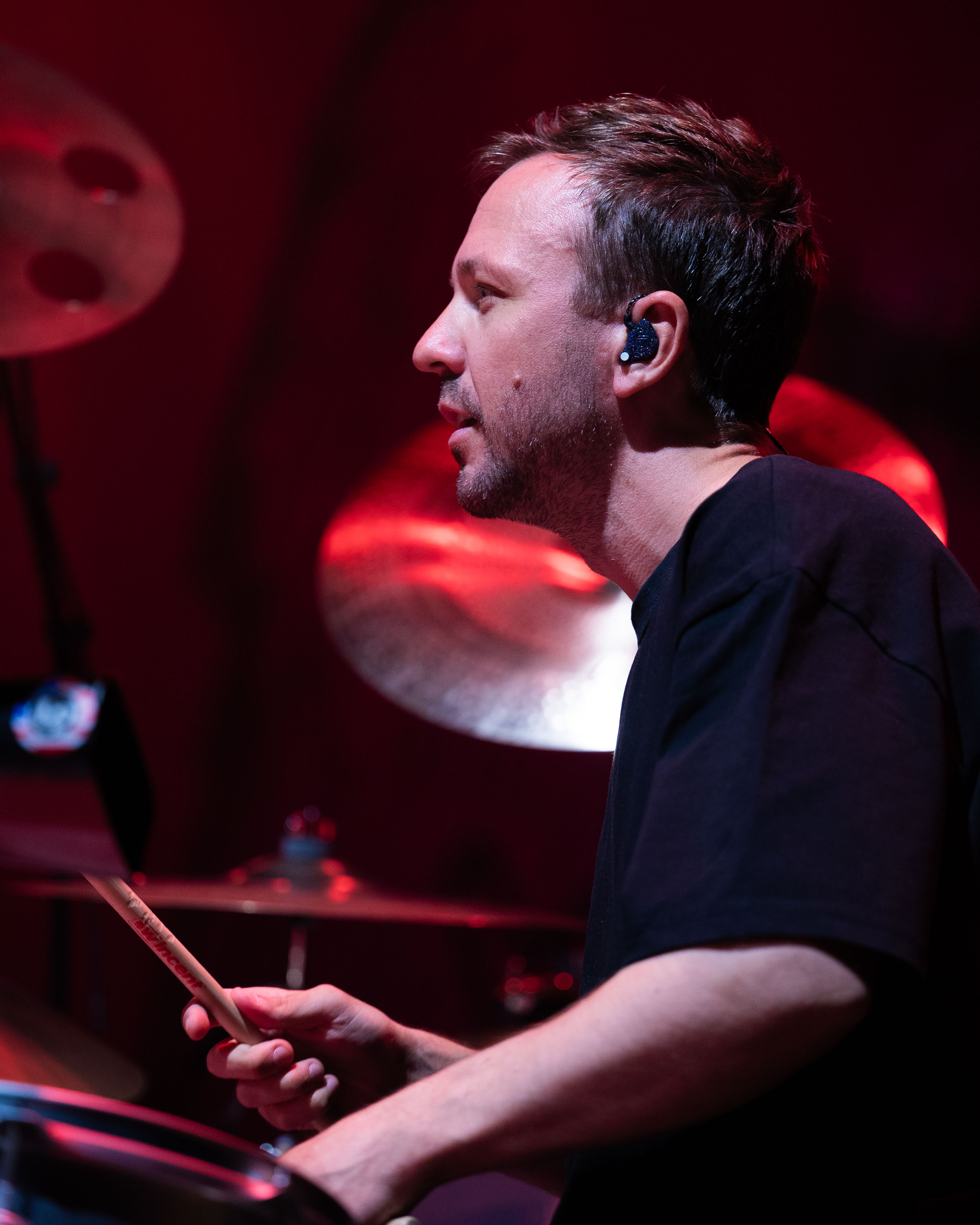
Aron Mellergård (2025)

=== Henrik Linder – bass guitar ===
Henrik Linder was born in Sweden and started playing piano at age 4. Growing up, he listened to music that his older sister listened to, including artists such as Soundgarden since he liked the band's use of odd meters in their songs. When he was around 12 years old, a girl he had a crush on told him that bass was the "sexiest instrument".

Later on, at 13 years old, Linder switched to bass guitar. One of his first childhood bass idols was Flea from the Red Hot Chili Peppers after listening to the band's song "Aeroplane" from the album One Hot Minute. In addition, Linder later discovered groups like The Brecker Brothers and Tribal Tech, featuring Gary Willis on bass. Gary Willis would become one of his greatest influences. Linder also started taking lessons with a local Swedish bass player, Robert Sudin. At age 16, Linder was already a busy Stockholm session musician and played with many different groups.

Linder attended secondary school at Södra Latin, and afterwards, studied jazz at the Royal College of Music in Stockholm, Sweden. While studying, he collaborated with his childhood friend and drummer Aron Mellergård. As classmates at the Royal Academy of Music, they would both practice and jam together as much as possible. Later on, Mellergårdh and Linder started working with another one of their classmates and childhood friends, pianist and vocalist Jonah Nilsson. Their collaboration eventually led to the creation of Dirty Loops in 2008.

=== Aron Mellergård – drums ===
Aron Mellergård grew up in Gislaved, Sweden, where he was inspired to learn to play the drums from a musical family. He met future Dirty Loops bandmates Jonah Nilsson and Henrik Linder at Södra Latin, a secondary school in Södermalm Stockholm. He then attended the Royal College of Music in Stockholm before committing to Dirty Loops.

=== Live members ===
- Jonathan Waldenfrid - keyboards & backing vocals

== Discography ==
=== Studio albums ===
Year	Album	Peak positions				Certification
Year	Album	SWE	DEN	NOR	USA	Certification
2014	Loopified	19	26	25	86	
2020	Phoenix	—	—	—	—	
2021	Turbo (with Cory Wong)	—	—	—	—	
2024	Beagle	—	—	—	—	

=== Singles ===
Title	Year	Album
"Work Shit Out"	2019	Phoenix
"Next to You"	2019	Phoenix
"Rock You"	2020	Phoenix
"Follow the Light" (with Cory Wong)	2021	Turbo
"Ring of Saturn" (with Cory Wong)	2021	Turbo
"Run Away"	2024	Beagle
"When The Time Is Right"	2024	Beagle
