= Schxxl Out =

- Digital and physical cover for the "In" version

EP by Pristin
- Released: August 23, 2017
- Recorded: 2017
- Genre: K-pop; dance-pop
- Length: 15:17
- Label: Pledis; LOEN

Pristin chronology
Hi! Pristin (2017)	Schxxl Out (2017)

Alternative cover
- Physical cover for the "Out" version

Singles from Schxxl Out
- 1. "We Like" Released: August 23, 2017

Schxxl Out (stylized as SCHXXL OUT) is the second and final extended play by South Korean girl group Pristin. It was released on August 23, 2017, by Pledis Entertainment and distributed by LOEN Entertainment. The EP consists of five songs, including the single "We Like", which also had a music video released on August 23. The group performed in various Korean music shows to promote the album. This is their last album before their disbandment in May 2019.

== Background ==
After ending the promotions for their debut mini album Hi! Pristin, the group went on pursue further envandors elsewhere, until on May 22, through a Facebook live stream with the Chinese entertainment website Idols of Asia, they revealed their plans to make a comeback during the summer.

== Release ==
On August 5, the timetable for their comeback was unveiled, confirming the mini album to be released on August 23. The tracklist for the EP was unveiled on August 18. Finally, on August 23, the Schxxl Out was officially released through several digital retailers, including Melon in South Korea, and iTunes for the global market. Physically, the album came out in two versions, the "In" version features a high school concept, while the "Out" version features an after school concept. A music video for the title track "We Like" was also released on the same day.

== Promotion ==
On August 23, Pristin held a showcase to promote the mini album, where they performed the songs "We Like" and "Aloha". The following day, on August 24, they made their first comeback stage on Mnet's M Countdown, performing the same songs as the showcase. The promotions continued through KBS's Music Bank on August 25, MBC's Show! Music Core on August 26, SBS's Inkigayo on August 27, SBS MTV's The Show on August 29, and MBC Music's Show Champion's on August 30.

== Commercial performance ==
Schxxl Out debuted on the Gaon Album Chart at number 4 on the issue dated between August 20 and August 26, 2017. In the week of September 9, 2017, the album entered the Billboard's World Albums Chart at number 5. It also appeared at number 116 on the Oricon Albums Chart.

== Track listing ==
Credits adapted from Naver.

No.	Title	Lyrics	Music	Arrangement	Length
1.	"We Are Pristin"	Sungyeon; Xiyeon	Bumzu; Sungyeon; Xiyeon; G-High	Bumzu; G-High	2:44
2.	"We Like"	Roa; Sungyeon	Simon Petrén; Maja Keuc; Bumzu; Joe Michel; Park Kitae; Sungyeon	Simon Petrén; Kitae	3:17
3.	"Aloha"	GDLO; Roa; Xiyeon; Kyla	GDLO; Roa; Xiyeon	GDLO	2:48
4.	"Tina" (티나)	Yehana; Hwang Hyun; Anchor	Yehana; Hyun; Anchor	Hyun; Anchor	3:00
5.	"You're My Boy" (너 말야 너; Neo Malya Neo)	Iggy; Youngbae; Roa; Rena; Nayoung; Sungyeon; Xiyeon; Kyla	Iggy; Youngbae; Roa; Sungyeon	Iggy; Youngbae	3:28
Total length:					15:17

== Charts ==
Chart (2017)	Peak position	Ref.
Japan (Oricon Albums Chart)	116	
South Korea (Gaon Album Chart)	4	
United States (Billboard's World Albums)	5	

== Release history ==
Region	Date	Format	Label	Ref.
South Korea	August 23, 2017	CD, Digital download	Pledis Entertainment, LOEN Entertainment	
Worldwide	August 23, 2017	Digital download	Pledis Entertainment, LOEN Entertainment	
