= Loopified =

- US and European Album Cover

Studio album by Dirty Loops
- Released: 19 May 2014
- Genre: Jazz fusion, pop rock
- Length: 52:48
- Label: Verve

Dirty Loops chronology
Loopified (2014)	Phoenix (2020)

Alternative cover
- Japan Album Cover

Loopified is the debut album by Swedish band Dirty Loops. It was released in Japan on April 16, in the UK on May 19, and in the US August 19, 2014.

== Track listing ==
All tracks are written by Jonah Nilsson, Henrik Linder, Aron Mellergard & Andreas Carlsson except covers as listed.

No.	Title	Length
1.	"Hit Me"	3:31
2.	"Sexy Girls"	3:29
3.	"Sayonara Love"	4:14
4.	"Wake Me Up (Avicii Cover)"	3:26
5.	"Die For You"	3:17
6.	"It Hurts"	4:34
7.	"Lost in You"	3:43
8.	"Take on the World"	4:30
9.	"Accidentally in Love"	3:43
10.	"The Way She Walks"	4:11
11.	"Crash and Burn Delight"	4:09
12.	"Roller Coaster (Justin Bieber Cover)"	3:34
13.	"Automatic (Utada Hikaru Cover)"	4:11
14.	"Got Me Going"	3:08
Total length:		53:40

== American release ==
The American release omitted the last two songs and included three covers that the band posted as videos on YouTube before the album was produced:

No.	Title	Length
13.	"Circus (Britney Spears Cover)"	3:45
14.	"Rolling In The Deep (Adele Cover)"	2:51
15.	"Baby (Justin Bieber Cover)"	2:45
Total length:		55:42

== Personnel ==
Personnel adapted from Loopified liner notes

Dirty Loops

- Jonah Nilsson - vocals, keyboards
- Henrik Linder - bass guitar
- Aron Mellergard - drums

Additional personnel

- Jerry Hey - arrangements, band leader
- Filip Jers - harmonica
- Erik Lidbom - keyboards, synthesizer
- Andreas Ekstedt - percussion
- Dan Higgins - saxophone
- Nisse Westfelt - tambourine
- Bill Reichenbach - trombone
- Gary Grant - trumpet
- Wayne Bergeron - trumpet
