= Hi! Pristin =

EP by Pristin
- Released: March 21, 2017
- Recorded: 2016–2017
- Genre: K-pop; dance-pop; hip hop
- Length: 20:34
- Label: Pledis; LOEN

Pristin chronology
Hi! Pristin (2017)	Schxxl Out (2017)

Singles from Hi! Pristin
- 1. "Wee Woo" Released: March 21, 2017; 2. "Black Widow" Released: May 19, 2017

Hi! Pristin (stylized in all caps) is the debut extended play by South Korean girl group Pristin. It was released on March 21, 2017, by Pledis Entertainment, and distributed by LOEN Entertainment. The EP consists of six songs, including the singles "Wee Woo" and "Black Widow". In order to promote the album, the group performed on several Korean music shows.

== Background ==
On March 23, 2016, Pledis Entertainment announced they were to debut a new girl group, temporarily called Pledis Girlz. 7 of the 10 members, Eunwoo, Kyulkyung, Nayoung, Rena, Roa, Xiyeon and Yuha, previously competed during the first season of Mnet's survival show Produce 101, where Kyulkyung and Nayoung became finalists and debuted as part of the group I.O.I. Meanwhile, the remaining members held weekly concerts to promote the upcoming group.

The last concert as Pledis Girlz was held on January 6, 2017, where they revealed the official name of the group to be Pristin. After I.O.I disbanded, on January 29, the 10 members were finally reunited.

== Release ==
On March 2, the first teaser image was revealed, confirming their first mini album to be released on March 21. The schedule for their debut was unveiled on March 7, while the tracklist for the album came out on March 13. The next day, on March 14, a highlight medley was also released on the group's official YouTube channel, featuring a preview from each song of the album.

The EP was finally released on March 21 through several digital retailers, including Melon in South Korea, and iTunes for the global market. Physically, the album received two versions, Prismatic and Elastin, the words that originated the name Pristin.

== Singles ==
The first single "Wee Woo" was used as the title track to promote the album. It was released on March 21, along with a music video.

"Black Widow" was released as the second and final single on May 19. For promotion purposes, the song received a remixed version, which was used by the group to perform on music shows.

=== Promotional singles ===
"We" was released as a promotional digital single on June 27, 2016, when the group was still called Pledis Girlz. Due to Kyulkyung and Nayoung promoting with I.O.I, the single version of the song doesn't feature them. An accompanying music video was also released on the same day.

== Promotion ==
Pristin performed their debut song "Wee Woo" for the first time on March 21 during Mnet Present's live broadcast, becoming the first rookie girl group to do so. The next day, a showcase was held, where they interacted with fans and performed songs from the released album. On March 23, they held their debut stage on Mnet's M Countdown. The promotions continued through KBS's Music Bank on March 24, MBC's Show! Music Core on March 25, SBS's Inkigayo on March 26, MBC Music's Show Champion on March 29, and SBS MTV's The Show on April 4. The last stage for the single was held on Inkigayo on May 7. The song was also performed during the KCON festival in Japan on May 19, and on the 2017 Dream Concert at the Seoul World Cup Stadium on June 6.

To wrap up the promotions for the album, the group performed a remixed version of "Black Widow" on music shows during a whole week.

== Commercial performance ==
Hi! Pristin entered the Gaon Album Chart at number 4 on the issue dated between March 19 and March 25, 2017. It also appeared at number 10 on the Billboard's World Albums Chart on the week of April 8, 2017. For the month of March, 23,519 physical copies of the album were sold, appearing at number 10 on the monthly edition of the Gaon Album Chart. As of June 2017, the album had sold 42,299 copies.

== Track listing ==
Credits adapted from Naver.

No.	Title	Lyrics	Music	Arrangement	Length
1.	"Be the Star"	Nayoung; Eunwoo	Yehana; Anchor; Maja Keuc	Jo Michelle; Anchor	3:26
2.	"Wee Woo"	Sungyeon; Bumzu; Sophia Pae; Gustav Karlstrom	Sungyeon; Bumzu; Anchor; Park Kitae	Bumzu; Anchor; Kitae	3:12
3.	"Black Widow"	Roa; Sungyeon; Simon Petrén; Ylva Dimberg	Rena; Petrén; Dimberg; Jo Michelle	Petrén	3:13
4.	"Running"	Roa; Rena; Sungyeon	Sungyeon; Glory Face; Anchor	Sungyeon; Anchor	3:07
5.	"Over n Over"	Eunwoo; Sungyeon; Yuha; Kyulkyung; Xiyeon; Kyla	Eunwoo; Lee Joohyung; Gustav Karlstrom	Joohyung; Karlstrom	3:42
6.	"We"	Roa; Eunwoo; Sungyeon; Xiyeon	Eunwoo; Sungyeon; Kinie.K	Kinie.K; Lee Kihyun	3:54
Total length:					20:34

Notes

- The album version of "We" features all 10 members, while the single version excludes Kyulkyung and Nayoung.

== Charts ==
=== Weekly charts ===
Chart (2017)	Peak position	Ref.
Japan (Oricon Albums Chart)	157	
South Korea (Gaon Album Chart)	4	
United States (Billboard's World Albums)	10	

=== Monthly charts ===
Chart (2017)	Peak position	Ref.
South Korea (Gaon Album Chart)	10	

== Release history ==
Region	Date	Format	Label	Ref.
South Korea	March 21, 2017	CD, Digital download	Pledis Entertainment, LOEN Entertainment	
Worldwide	March 21, 2017	Digital download	Pledis Entertainment, LOEN Entertainment	
