= List of awards and nominations received by Seventeen =

Seventeen awards and nominations
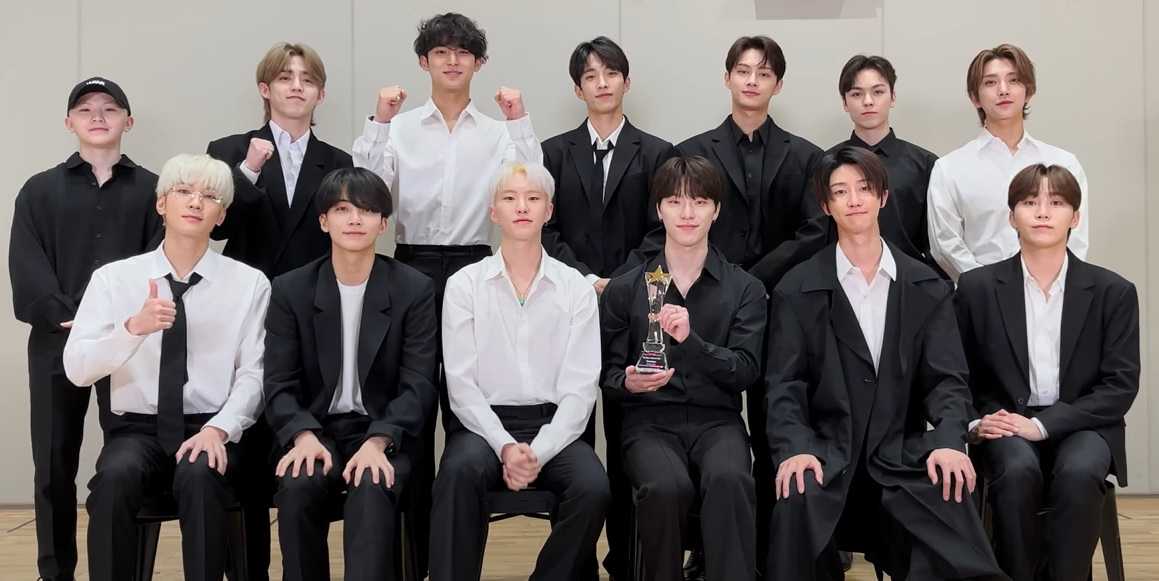
- Seventeen with an award from the Top Ten Awards in 2022
Awards and nominations
Award	Wins	Nominations
American Music Awards	0	1
APAN Music Awards	2	3
Asia Artist Awards	14	18
Asia Model Awards	1	1
Asia Music Festival	2	2
Asian Pop Music Awards	14	14
Billboard Music Awards	1	2
Brand Customer Loyalty Awards	1	2
Brand of the Year Awards	3	3
Circle Chart Music Awards	12	31
The Fact Music Awards	6	7
D Awards	1	2
Genie Music Awards	0	10
Golden Disc Awards	17	38
Hanteo Music Awards	5	13
iHeartRadio Music Awards	0	2
Japan Gold Disc Awards	18	18
Japan Record Awards	1	1
K-Global Heart Dream Awards	1	1
K-World Dream Awards	2	3
KMC Awards	0	2
Korea Cable TV Awards	1	1
Korea Popular Music Awards	0	4
MAMA Awards	27	71
Melon Music Awards	8	27
MTV Europe Music Awards	2	6
MTV MIAW Awards	0	4
MTV Video Music Awards	2	8
Music Awards Japan	1	2
Nickelodeon Mexico Kids' Choice Awards	0	1
QQ Boom Boom Awards	1	1
Seoul Music Awards	9	39
Soribada Best K-Music Awards	0	7
Teen Choice Awards	0	1
Tencent Music Entertainment Awards	1	1
V Live Awards	4	6

Totals (Note: Certain award groups do not simply award one winner. They acknowledge several different recipients, have runners-up, and have third place. Since this is a specific recognition and is different from losing an award, runner-up mentions are considered wins in this award tally. For simplification and to avoid errors, each award in this list has been presumed to have had a prior nomination.)
- Wins: 154
- Nominations: 342

South Korean boy band Seventeen debuted in 2015 and have since garnered many awards and nominations for their contribution to music. Their debut extended play (EP) 17 Carat was released on May 29, 2015, to little commercial success, though lead to multiple nominations and wins for new artist of the year, alongside their follow-up EP Boys Be.

== Awards and nominations ==
List of awards and nominations, showing award ceremony, year presented, category, nominee(s) and the result of the nomination
Award ceremony	Year (Note: Each year is linked to the article about the awards held that year, wherever possible.)	Category	Nominee(s)	Result	Ref.
American Music Awards	2022	Favorite K-pop Artist	Seventeen	Nominated	
APAN Music Awards	2020	Top 10 (Bonsang)	Seventeen	Won	
APAN Music Awards	2020	Idol Champ Global Pick – Group	Seventeen	Won	
APAN Music Awards	2020	Best Music Video	Seventeen	Nominated	
Asia Artist Awards	2016	Popularity Award – Music	Seventeen	Nominated	
Asia Artist Awards	2016	Best Star Award – Music	Seventeen	Won	
Asia Artist Awards	2017	Popularity Award – Music	Seventeen	Nominated	
Asia Artist Awards	2017	Best Artist Award – Music	Seventeen	Won	
Asia Artist Awards	2018	Artist of the Year – Music	Seventeen	Won	
Asia Artist Awards	2018	Best Artist Award – Music	Seventeen	Won	
Asia Artist Awards	2019	Best Social Artist Award – Music	Seventeen	Won	
Asia Artist Awards	2019	Best Icon Award – Music	Seventeen	Won	
Asia Artist Awards	2019	Album of the Year (Daesang)	An Ode	Won	
Asia Artist Awards	2020	Popularity Award – Music	Seventeen	Nominated	
Asia Artist Awards	2021	Artist of the Year (Daesang)	Seventeen	Won	
Asia Artist Awards	2021	Fabulous Award	Seventeen	Won	
Asia Artist Awards	2022	Fabulous Award – Music	Seventeen	Won	
Asia Artist Awards	2022	Hot Trend Award – Music	Seventeen	Won	
Asia Artist Awards	2022	Singer of the Year (Daesang)	Seventeen	Won	
Asia Artist Awards	2023	Album of the Year (Daesang)	Seventeen	Won	
Asia Artist Awards	2024	Best K-pop Record	Seventeen	Won	
Asia Artist Awards	2026	Popularity Award – Group (Male)	Seventeen	Pending	
Asia Model Awards	2016	Popular Singer Award	Seventeen	Won	
Asia Music Festival	2019	Album of the Year	An Ode	Won	
Asia Music Festival	2019	Asia's Group of the Year	Seventeen	Won	
Asian Pop Music Awards (Note: Hosted by the Hong Kong Asia Pacific International Group and Sunway Records, the Asian Pop Music Awards bases its winners on the "Asian Pop Music Chart" which opened in September 2019.)	2021	Top 20 Songs of the Year – Overseas	"Rock with You"	Won	
Asian Pop Music Awards	2022	Best Group – Overseas	Seventeen	Won	
Asian Pop Music Awards	2022	Top 20 Songs of the Year – Overseas	"Hot"	Won	
Asian Pop Music Awards	2022	Top 20 Albums of the Year – Overseas	Face the Sun	Won	
Asian Pop Music Awards	2022	Best Dance Performance – Overseas	"Hot"	Won	
Asian Pop Music Awards	2022	People's Choice Award	Face the Sun	6th place	
Asian Pop Music Awards	2023	Best Dance Performance – Overseas	"Super"	Won	
Asian Pop Music Awards	2023	Top 20 Songs of the Year – Overseas	"Super"	Won	
Asian Pop Music Awards	2023	Top 20 Albums of the Year – Overseas	FML	Won	
Asian Pop Music Awards	2023	People's Choice Award – Overseas	Seventeen	2nd place	
Asian Pop Music Awards	2024	Best Group – Overseas	Seventeen	Won	
Asian Pop Music Awards	2024	Top 20 Albums of the Year – Overseas	17 is Right Here	Won	
Asian Pop Music Awards	2025	Best Group – Overseas	Seventeen	Won	
Asian Pop Music Awards	2025	Top 20 Albums of the Year – Overseas	Happy Burstday	Won	
Billboard Music Awards	2021	Top Social Artist	Seventeen	Nominated	
Billboard Music Awards	2024	Top K-pop Touring Artist	Seventeen	Won	
Brand Customer Loyalty Awards	2021	Best Male Idol Group	Seventeen	Nominated	
Brand Customer Loyalty Awards	2022	Best Male Idol Group	Seventeen	Won	
Brand of the Year Awards	2022	Male Idol of the Year	Seventeen	Won	
Brand of the Year Awards	2023	Male Idol of the Year	Seventeen	Won	
Circle Chart Music Awards	2016	New Artist of the Year	Seventeen	Nominated	
Circle Chart Music Awards	2016	World Rookie Award	Seventeen	Won	
Circle Chart Music Awards	2016	Album of the Year – 3rd Quarter	Boys Be	Nominated	
Circle Chart Music Awards	2017	Hot Performance Artist	Seventeen	Won	
Circle Chart Music Awards	2017	Album of the Year – 4th Quarter	Going Seventeen	Nominated	
Circle Chart Music Awards	2018	Album of the Year – 2nd Quarter	Al1	Won	
Circle Chart Music Awards	2018	Album of the Year – 4th Quarter	Teen, Age	Nominated	
Circle Chart Music Awards	2019	Album of the Year – 1st Quarter	Director's Cut	Nominated	
Circle Chart Music Awards	2019	Album of the Year – 3rd Quarter	You Make My Day	Nominated	
Circle Chart Music Awards	2019	Song of the Year – February	"Thanks"	Nominated	
Circle Chart Music Awards	2019	Hot Performance Artist	Seventeen	Won	
Circle Chart Music Awards	2019	World Hallyu Star	Seventeen	Won	
Circle Chart Music Awards	2020	Album of the Year – 1st Quarter	You Made My Dawn	Won	
Circle Chart Music Awards	2020	Album of the Year – 3rd Quarter	An Ode	Won	
Circle Chart Music Awards	2021	Mubeat Global Choice Award (Male)	Seventeen	Nominated	
Circle Chart Music Awards	2021	Album of the Year – 3rd Quarter	Heng:garae	Won	
Circle Chart Music Awards	2021	Album of the Year – 4th Quarter	Semicolon	Nominated	
Circle Chart Music Awards	2022	Song of the Year (October)	"Rock with You"	Nominated	
Circle Chart Music Awards	2022	Album of the Year – 3rd Quarter	Your Choice	Nominated	
Circle Chart Music Awards	2022	Album of the Year – 4th Quarter	Attacca	Nominated	
Circle Chart Music Awards	2023	Album of the Year – 2nd Quarter	Face the Sun	Won	
Circle Chart Music Awards	2023	Album of the Year – 3rd Quarter	Sector 17	Nominated	
Circle Chart Music Awards	2023	Best Male Group	Seventeen	Won	
Circle Chart Music Awards	2023	Song of the Year – April	"Darl+ing"	Nominated	
Circle Chart Music Awards	2023	Song of the Year – May	"Hot"	Nominated	
Circle Chart Music Awards	2023	Song of the Year – July	"_World"	Nominated	
Circle Chart Music Awards	2024	Artist of the Year – Global Streaming	"Super"	Nominated	
Circle Chart Music Awards	2024	Artist of the Year – Digital	"Super"	Nominated	
Circle Chart Music Awards	2024	Artist of the Year – Streaming Unique Listeners	"Super"	Nominated	
Circle Chart Music Awards	2024	Artist of the Year – Album	Seventeenth Heaven	Won	
Circle Chart Music Awards	2024	Retail Album of the Year	FML	Won	
Circle Chart Music Awards	2024	Kit-Album of the Year	Seventeen	Won	
D Awards	2025	Artist of the Year (Daesang)	Seventeen	Won	
D Awards	2025	Best Popularity Award — Boy Group	Seventeen	Nominated	
The Fact Music Awards	2020	Popularity Award	Seventeen	Nominated	
The Fact Music Awards	2020	Artist of the Year	Seventeen	Won	
The Fact Music Awards	2020	Worldwide Icon	Seventeen	Won	
The Fact Music Awards	2021	Artist of the Year	Seventeen	Won	
The Fact Music Awards	2021	Best Performer	Seventeen	Won	
The Fact Music Awards	2023	Artist of the Year	Seventeen	Won	
The Fact Music Awards	2023	Daesang Award	Seventeen	Won	
Genie Music Awards	2018	Artist of the Year	Seventeen	Nominated	
Genie Music Awards	2018	Male Group Award	Seventeen	Nominated	
Genie Music Awards	2018	Genie Music Popularity Award	Seventeen	Nominated	
Genie Music Awards	2018	Song of the Year	"Oh My!"	Nominated	
Genie Music Awards	2018	Dance Track (Male)	"Oh My!"	Nominated	
Genie Music Awards	2019	Top Artist	Seventeen	Nominated	
Genie Music Awards	2019	Male Group	Seventeen	Nominated	
Genie Music Awards	2019	Performing Artist – Male	Seventeen	Nominated	
Genie Music Awards	2019	Genie Music Popularity Award	Seventeen	Nominated	
Genie Music Awards	2019	Global Popularity Award	Seventeen	Nominated	
Genie Music Awards	2022	Artist of the Year	Seventeen	Nominated	
Genie Music Awards	2022	Best Male Group	Seventeen	Nominated	
Genie Music Awards	2022	Best Male Performance Award	Seventeen	Nominated	
Genie Music Awards	2022	Genie Music Popularity Award	Seventeen	Nominated	
Genie Music Awards	2022	Album of the Year	Face the Sun	Nominated	
Golden Disc Awards	2016	Disc Bonsang	Boys Be	Nominated	
Golden Disc Awards	2016	Best New Artist	Seventeen	Won	
Golden Disc Awards	2016	Popularity Award (Korea)	Seventeen	Nominated	
Golden Disc Awards	2016	Global Popularity Award	Seventeen	Nominated	
Golden Disc Awards	2017	Disc Daesang	Love & Letter	Nominated	
Golden Disc Awards	2017	Disc Bonsang	Love & Letter	Won	
Golden Disc Awards	2017	Popularity Award	Seventeen	Nominated	
Golden Disc Awards	2018	Disc Daesang	Teen, Age	Nominated	
Golden Disc Awards	2018	Disc Bonsang	Teen, Age	Won	
Golden Disc Awards	2018	Global Popularity Award	Seventeen	Nominated	
Golden Disc Awards	2019	Disc Daesang	You Make My Day	Nominated	
Golden Disc Awards	2019	Disc Bonsang	You Make My Day	Won	
Golden Disc Awards	2019	Popularity Award	Seventeen	Nominated	
Golden Disc Awards	2019	NetEase Most Popular K-pop Star Award	Seventeen	Nominated	
Golden Disc Awards	2020	Disc Daesang	An Ode	Nominated	
Golden Disc Awards	2020	Disc Bonsang	An Ode	Won	
Golden Disc Awards	2020	Most Popular Artist Award	Seventeen	Nominated	
Golden Disc Awards	2021	Disc Daesang	Heng:garæ	Nominated	
Golden Disc Awards	2021	Disc Bonsang	Heng:garæ	Won	
Golden Disc Awards	2021	Curaprox Popularity Award	Seventeen	Nominated	
Golden Disc Awards	2021	QQ Music Popularity Award	Seventeen	Nominated	
Golden Disc Awards	2022	Disc Bonsang	Attacca	Won	
Golden Disc Awards	2022	Seezn Most Popular Artist Award	Seventeen	Nominated	
Golden Disc Awards	2022	Cosmopolitan Artist Award	Seventeen	Won	
Golden Disc Awards	2023	Best performance	"Hot"	Won	
Golden Disc Awards	2023	Best Album (Bonsang)	Face the Sun	Won	
Golden Disc Awards	2023	Thai K-pop Artist	Seventeen	Won	
Golden Disc Awards	2024	Digital Daesang (Song of the Year)	"Super"	Nominated	
Golden Disc Awards	2024	Album Daesang (Album of the Year)	FML	Won	
Golden Disc Awards	2024	Digital Bonsang	"Super"	Won	
Golden Disc Awards	2024	Album Bonsang	FML	Won	
Golden Disc Awards	2025	Most Popular Artist – Male	Seventeen	Nominated	
Golden Disc Awards	2025	Album Daesang (Album of the Year)	Spill the Feels	Won	
Golden Disc Awards	2025	Album Bonsang	Spill the Feels	Won	
Golden Disc Awards	2026	Most Popular Artist – Male	Seventeen	Nominated	
Golden Disc Awards	2026	Album Daesang (Album of the Year)	Happy Burstday	Nominated	
Golden Disc Awards	2026	Album Bonsang	Happy Burstday	Won	
Golden Disc Awards	2026	Digital Song Bonsang	Thunder	Nominated	
Hanteo Music Awards	2021	Initial Chodong Record Award	Seventeen	Won	
Hanteo Music Awards	2021	WhosFandom Award	Seventeen	Won	
Hanteo Music Awards	2022	Main Award (Bonsang)	Seventeen	Won	
Hanteo Music Awards	2022	WhosFandom Award	Seventeen	Nominated	
Hanteo Music Awards	2023	Best Album (Daesang)	Seventeen	Won	
Hanteo Music Awards	2023	Main Award (Bonsang)	Seventeen	Won	
Hanteo Music Awards	2024	Global Artist – Africa	Seventeen	Nominated	
Hanteo Music Awards	2024	Global Artist – Asia	Seventeen	Nominated	
Hanteo Music Awards	2024	Global Artist – Europe	Seventeen	Nominated	
Hanteo Music Awards	2024	Global Artist – North America	Seventeen	Nominated	
Hanteo Music Awards	2024	Global Artist – Oceania	Seventeen	Nominated	
Hanteo Music Awards	2024	Global Artist – South America	Seventeen	Nominated	
Hanteo Music Awards	2024	WhosFandom Award – Male	Seventeen	Nominated	
iHeartRadio Music Awards	2024	K-pop Artist of the Year	Seventeen	Nominated	
iHeartRadio Music Awards	2025	Favorite K-pop Dance Challenge	"Maestro"	Nominated	
Japan Gold Disc Awards	2019	New Artist of the Year (Asia)	Seventeen	Won	
Japan Gold Disc Awards	2019	Best 3 New Artists (Asia)	Seventeen	Won	
Japan Gold Disc Awards	2021	Best 3 Albums (Asia)	24H	Won	
Japan Gold Disc Awards	2022	Best 3 Albums (Asia)	Attacca	Won	
Japan Gold Disc Awards	2023	Album of the Year (Asia)	Dream	Won	
Japan Gold Disc Awards	2023	Best 3 Albums (Asia)	Face the Sun	Won	
Japan Gold Disc Awards	2023	Best 3 Albums (Asia)	Dream	Won	
Japan Gold Disc Awards	2024	Best Artist (Asia)	Seventeen	Won	
Japan Gold Disc Awards	2024	Album of the Year (Asia)	FML	Won	
Japan Gold Disc Awards	2024	Best 3 Albums (Asia)	FML	Won	
Japan Gold Disc Awards	2024	Best 3 Albums (Asia)	Seventeenth Heaven	Won	
Japan Gold Disc Awards	2024	Best 3 Albums (Asia)	Always Yours	Won	
Japan Gold Disc Awards	2024	Music Video of the Year (Asia)	Seventeen World Tour [Be The Sun] Japan	Won	
Japan Gold Disc Awards	2025	Best Artist (Asia)	Seventeen	Won	
Japan Gold Disc Awards	2025	Album of the Year (Asia)	17 Is Right Here	Won	
Japan Gold Disc Awards	2025	Best 3 Albums (Asia)	17 Is Right Here	Won	
Japan Gold Disc Awards	2025	Best 3 Albums (Asia)	Spill the Feels	Won	
Japan Gold Disc Awards	2026	Best 3 Albums (Asia)	Happy Burstday	Won	
Japan Record Awards	2022	Special International Music Award	Seventeen	Won	
K-Global Heart Dream Awards	2023	Bonsang	Seventeen	Won	
K-World Dream Awards	2024	Best Song	Seventeen	Won	
K-World Dream Awards	2024	UPICK Popularity Award – Boy Group	Seventeen	Nominated	
K-World Dream Awards	2025	Best Album Artists	Seventeen	Won	
KMC Awards	2015	Rookie of the Year	Seventeen	Nominated	
KMC Awards	2015	Best Choreography	Seventeen	Nominated	
Korea Cable TV Awards	2017	Performance Award	Seventeen	Won	
Korea Popular Music Awards (Note: The Korea Popular Music Awards were jointly established in 2018 by the Korea Singers Association, the Korea Entertainment Producer's Association, the Recording Industry Association of Korea, the Federation of Korean Music Performers, and the Korea Music Copyright Association.)	2018	Best Digital Song	"Oh My!"	Nominated	
Korea Popular Music Awards	2018	Best Group Dance Track	"Oh My!"	Nominated	
Korea Popular Music Awards	2018	Best Artist	Seventeen	Nominated	
Korea Popular Music Awards	2018	Popularity Award	Seventeen	Nominated	
MAMA Awards	2015	Best New Male Artist	Seventeen	Nominated	
MAMA Awards	2015	Artist of the Year	Seventeen	Nominated	
MAMA Awards	2016	Album of the Year	Love & Letter	Nominated	
MAMA Awards	2016	Best Asian Style	Seventeen	Nominated	
MAMA Awards	2016	World Performer Award	Seventeen	Won	
MAMA Awards	2016	Song of the Year	"Pretty U"	Nominated	
MAMA Awards	2016	Best Dance Performance – Male Group	"Pretty U"	Nominated	
MAMA Awards	2017	Worldwide Favorite Artist	Seventeen	Won	
MAMA Awards	2017	2017 Favorite K-pop Star	Seventeen	Nominated	
MAMA Awards	2017	Best Male Group	Seventeen	Nominated	
MAMA Awards	2017	Best Music Video	"Don't Wanna Cry"	Nominated	
MAMA Awards	2017	Best Dance Performance – Male Group	"Don't Wanna Cry"	Won	
MAMA Awards	2017	Song of the Year	"Don't Wanna Cry"	Nominated	
MAMA Awards	2017	Artist of the Year	Seventeen	Nominated	
MAMA Awards	2017	Album of the Year	Al1	Nominated	
MAMA Awards	2018	Best Male Group	Seventeen	Nominated	
MAMA Awards	2018	Artist of the Year	Seventeen	Nominated	
MAMA Awards	2018	Worldwide Icon of the Year	Seventeen	Nominated	
MAMA Awards	2018	Worldwide Fans' Choice Top 10	Seventeen	Won	
MAMA Awards	2018	Best Dance Performance – Male Group	"Oh My!"	Won	
MAMA Awards	2018	Mwave Global Fans' Choice	"Oh My!"	Nominated	
MAMA Awards	2018	Song of the Year	"Oh My!"	Nominated	
MAMA Awards	2018	Best OST	"A-Teen"	Won	
MAMA Awards	2018	Album of the Year	You Make My Day	Nominated	
MAMA Awards	2019	Best Male Group	Seventeen	Nominated	
MAMA Awards	2019	Breakthrough Achievement	Seventeen	Won	
MAMA Awards	2019	Artist of the Year	Seventeen	Nominated	
MAMA Awards	2019	Worldwide Icon of the Year	Seventeen	Nominated	
MAMA Awards	2019	Worldwide Fans' Choice Top 10	Seventeen	Won	
MAMA Awards	2019	Best Dance Performance – Male Group	"Fear"	Nominated	
MAMA Awards	2019	Album of the Year	An Ode	Nominated	
MAMA Awards	2019	Song of the Year	"Fear"	Nominated	
MAMA Awards	2020	Global Favourite Performer	Seventeen	Won	
MAMA Awards	2020	Notable Achievement Artist	Seventeen	Won	
MAMA Awards	2020	Worldwide Fans' Choice Top 10	Seventeen	Won	
MAMA Awards	2020	Worldwide Icon of the Year	Seventeen	Nominated	
MAMA Awards	2020	Album of the Year	Heng:garæ	Nominated	
MAMA Awards	2020	Artist of the Year	Seventeen	Nominated	
MAMA Awards	2020	Best Dance Performance – Male Group	"Left & Right"	Nominated	
MAMA Awards	2020	Best Male Group	Seventeen	Nominated	
MAMA Awards	2021	Worldwide Fans' Choice Top 10	Seventeen	Won	
MAMA Awards	2021	Artist of the Year	Seventeen	Nominated	
MAMA Awards	2021	Best Male Group	Seventeen	Nominated	
MAMA Awards	2021	Best Dance Performance – Male Group	"Ready to Love"	Nominated	
MAMA Awards	2021	Worldwide Icon of the Year	Seventeen	Nominated	
MAMA Awards	2022	Best Dance Performance – Male Group	Seventeen	Won	
MAMA Awards	2022	Worldwide Fans' Choice Top 10	Seventeen	Won	
MAMA Awards	2022	Album of the Year	Face the Sun	Nominated	
MAMA Awards	2022	Best Male Group	Seventeen	Nominated	
MAMA Awards	2022	Worldwide Icon of the Year	Seventeen	Nominated	
MAMA Awards	2023	Album of the Year	FML	Won	
MAMA Awards	2023	Artist of the Year	Seventeen	Nominated	
MAMA Awards	2023	Best Male Group	Seventeen	Won	
MAMA Awards	2023	Best Dance Performance – Male Group	"Super"	Won	
MAMA Awards	2023	Culture & Style Award	Seventeen	Won	
MAMA Awards	2023	Worldwide Fans Choice Top 10	Seventeen	Won	
MAMA Awards	2023	Best Music Video	"Super"	Nominated	
MAMA Awards	2024	Artist of the Year	Seventeen	Won	
MAMA Awards	2024	Album of the Year	Seventeenth Heaven	Won	
MAMA Awards	2024	Worldwide Icon of the Year	Seventeen	Nominated	
MAMA Awards	2024	Best Male Group	Seventeen	Won	
MAMA Awards	2024	Best Dance Performance - Male Group	"God of Music"	Nominated	
MAMA Awards	2024	Best Music Video	"Maestro"	Nominated	
MAMA Awards	2024	Worldwide Fans' Choice Male Top 10	Seventeen	Won	
MAMA Awards	2024	Super Stage	Seventeen	Won	
MAMA Awards	2025	Artist of the Year	Seventeen	Nominated	
MAMA Awards	2025	Album of the Year	Spill the Feels	Nominated	
MAMA Awards	2025	Worldwide Icon of the Year	Seventeen	Nominated	
MAMA Awards	2025	Best Male Group	Seventeen	Won	
MAMA Awards	2025	Best Dance Performance - Male Group	"Thunder"	Won	
MAMA Awards	2025	Worldwide Fans' Choice Male Top 10	Seventeen	Won	
Melon Music Awards	2015	Best New Male Artist	Seventeen	Nominated	
Melon Music Awards	2016	Best Dance – Male	"Pretty U"	Nominated	
Melon Music Awards	2016	MBC Music Star Award	Seventeen	Won	
Melon Music Awards	2017	Top 10 Artist	Seventeen	Nominated	
Melon Music Awards	2017	Stage of the Year	Diamond Edge World Tour	Nominated	
Melon Music Awards	2018	Top 10 Artist	Seventeen	Nominated	
Melon Music Awards	2018	Best Dance Track – Male	"Thanks"	Nominated	
Melon Music Awards	2019	Top 10 Artist	Seventeen	Nominated	
Melon Music Awards	2019	Stage of the Year	Seventeen	Won	
Melon Music Awards	2020	Top 10 Artist	Seventeen	Nominated	
Melon Music Awards	2020	Best Dance Track – Male	"Left & Right"	Nominated	
Melon Music Awards	2021	Best Male Group	Seventeen	Nominated	
Melon Music Awards	2022	Top 10 Artist	Seventeen	Won	
Melon Music Awards	2023	Top 10 Artist	Seventeen	Won	
Melon Music Awards	2023	Millions Top 10 Artist	Seventeen	Won	
Melon Music Awards	2023	Best Male Performance	Seventeen	Won	
Melon Music Awards	2023	Artist of the Year	Seventeen	Longlisted	
Melon Music Awards	2023	Best Male Group	Seventeen	Nominated	
Melon Music Awards	2023	Kakao Favorite Star Award	Seventeen	Nominated	
Melon Music Awards	2024	Top 10 Artist	Seventeen	Won	
Melon Music Awards	2024	Artist of the Year	Seventeen	Longlisted	
Melon Music Awards	2024	Millions Top 10 Artist	Seventeen	Longlisted	
Melon Music Awards	2024	Best Male Group	Seventeen	Nominated	
Melon Music Awards	2024	Kakao Bank Everyone's Star	Seventeen	Nominated	
Melon Music Awards	2025	Top 10 Artist	Seventeen	Longlisted	
Melon Music Awards	2025	Millions Top 10 Artist	Seventeen	Won	
Melon Music Awards	2025	Best Male Group	Seventeen	Nominated	
Melon Music Awards	2025	Album of the Year	Seventeen	Nominated	
MTV Europe Music Awards	2017	Best Korean Act	Seventeen	Nominated	
MTV Europe Music Awards	2022	Best K-pop	Seventeen	Nominated	
MTV Europe Music Awards	2022	Best Push	Seventeen	Won	
MTV Europe Music Awards	2022	Best New Act	Seventeen	Won	
MTV Europe Music Awards	2023	Best Group	Seventeen	Nominated	
MTV Europe Music Awards	2023	Best K-pop	Seventeen	Nominated	
MTV MIAW Awards	2018	K-pop Explosion	Seventeen	Nominated	
MTV MIAW Awards	2021	K-pop Domination	Seventeen	Nominated	
MTV MIAW Awards	2022	K-pop Domination	Seventeen	Nominated	
MTV MIAW Awards	2023	K-pop Domination	Seventeen	Nominated	
MTV Video Music Awards	2021	Best K-pop	"Ready to Love"	Nominated	
MTV Video Music Awards	2022	Push Performance of the Year	"Rock with You"	Won	
MTV Video Music Awards	2022	Best New Artist	Seventeen	Nominated	
MTV Video Music Awards	2022	Best K-pop	"Hot"	Nominated	
MTV Video Music Awards	2023	Best K-pop	"Super"	Nominated	
MTV Video Music Awards	2023	Group of the Year	Seventeen	Nominated	
MTV Video Music Awards	2024	Group of the Year	Seventeen	Won	
MTV Video Music Awards	2025	Group of the Year	Seventeen	Nominated	
Music Awards Japan	2025	Best of Listeners' Choice: International Song	"Shohikigen"	Nominated	
Music Awards Japan	2025	Special Award: Korean Popular Music	"God of Music"	Won	
Nickelodeon Mexico Kids' Choice Awards	2023	Favorite K-pop Group	Seventeen	Nominated	
QQ Boom Boom Awards	2020	Asia Pioneer Idol Group of the Year	Seventeen	Won	
Seoul Music Awards	2016	New Artist Award	Seventeen	Won	
Seoul Music Awards	2016	Bonsang Award	Seventeen	Nominated	
Seoul Music Awards	2016	Popularity Award	Seventeen	Nominated	
Seoul Music Awards	2016	Hallyu Special Award	Seventeen	Nominated	
Seoul Music Awards	2017	Bonsang Award	Seventeen	Won	
Seoul Music Awards	2017	Daesang Award	Seventeen	Nominated	
Seoul Music Awards	2017	Popularity Award	Seventeen	Nominated	
Seoul Music Awards	2017	Hallyu Special Award	Seventeen	Nominated	
Seoul Music Awards	2018	Bonsang Award	Seventeen	Won	
Seoul Music Awards	2018	Daesang Award	Seventeen	Nominated	
Seoul Music Awards	2018	Popularity Award	Seventeen	Nominated	
Seoul Music Awards	2018	Hallyu Special Award	Seventeen	Nominated	
Seoul Music Awards	2019	Bonsang Award	Seventeen	Won	
Seoul Music Awards	2019	Daesang Award	Seventeen	Nominated	
Seoul Music Awards	2020	Bonsang Award	Seventeen	Nominated	
Seoul Music Awards	2020	Hallyu Special Award	Seventeen	Nominated	
Seoul Music Awards	2020	Popularity Award	Seventeen	Nominated	
Seoul Music Awards	2020	QQ Music Most Popular K-pop Artist Award	Seventeen	Nominated	
Seoul Music Awards	2021	Bonsang Award	Seventeen	Won	
Seoul Music Awards	2021	Daesang Award	Seventeen	Nominated	
Seoul Music Awards	2021	Popularity Award	Seventeen	Nominated	
Seoul Music Awards	2021	Legend Rookie Prize	Seventeen	Nominated	
Seoul Music Awards	2022	Daesang Award	Seventeen	Nominated	
Seoul Music Awards	2022	Bonsang Award	Seventeen	Won	
Seoul Music Awards	2022	Popularity Award	Seventeen	Nominated	
Seoul Music Awards	2022	K-Wave Popularity Award	Seventeen	Nominated	
Seoul Music Awards	2022	U+Idol Live Best Artist Award	Seventeen	Nominated	
Seoul Music Awards	2023	Daesang Award	Seventeen	Nominated	
Seoul Music Awards	2023	Bonsang Award	Seventeen	Won	
Seoul Music Awards	2023	Popularity Award	Seventeen	Nominated	
Seoul Music Awards	2023	Hallyu Special Award	Seventeen	Nominated	
Seoul Music Awards	2024	Daesang Award	Seventeen	Nominated	
Seoul Music Awards	2024	Bonsang Award	Seventeen	Won	
Seoul Music Awards	2024	Popularity Award	Seventeen	Nominated	
Seoul Music Awards	2024	Hallyu Special Award	Seventeen	Nominated	
Seoul Music Awards	2024	Best Album Award	FML	Won	
Teen Choice Awards	2017	Choice International Artist	Seventeen	Nominated	
Tencent Music Entertainment Awards	2023	Most Influential Overseas Group of the Year	Seventeen	Won	
V Live Awards	2017	Global Artist Top 10	Seventeen	Won	
V Live Awards	2018	Global Artist Top 10	Seventeen	Won	
V Live Awards	2019	Artist Top 10	Seventeen	Won	
V Live Awards	2019	Global Artist Top 12	Seventeen	Won	
V Live Awards	2019	Best Channel – 3 million followers	Seventeen	Nominated	
V Live Awards	2019	The Most Loved Artist	Seventeen	Nominated	

== Other accolades ==
=== State and cultural honors ===
Name of country or organization, year given, and name of honor or award
Country or Organization	Year	Honor or Award	Ref.
E-Daily Culture Awards	2022	Cultural Grand Prize for Best Work – Concert	
South Korea (Note: Honors are given at the Korean Popular Culture and Arts Awards, arranged by the Korea Creative Content Agency and hosted by the Ministry of Culture, Sports and Tourism. They are awarded to those who have contributed to the arts and South Korea's pop culture.)	2020	Prime Minister's Commendation	
South Korea	2025	Presidential Commendation	
LA3C Festival	2022	Minister of Culture, Sports and Tourism Award	
Newsis K-Expo Cultural Awards (Note: Co-sponsored by Korea's Ministry of Culture, Sports and Tourism, Ministry of Trade, Industry, and Energy, Korea Communications Commission, and Korea Creative Content Agency, it awards cultural icons and businesses who have contributed greatly to Hallyu, the Korean wave.)	2021	Building K-ulture Bridges: Culture Ambassador Award	

=== Listicles ===
Name of publisher, year listed, name of listicle, and placement
Publisher	Year	Listicle	Placement	Ref.
Forbes	2025	Korea Power Celebrity 40	8th	
Gold House (Note: The A100 List honors the most impactful Asians and Asian American & Pacific Islanders (AAPIs) in culture every May for AAPI Heritage Month. Gold House "champions trailblazing members of the AAPI community and their transformative contributions to entertainment, fashion, lifestyle, technology, business, social activism and politics from the past year".)	2025	A100 Most Impactful Asians List	Placed	
Teen Vogue	2022	33 Best Boy Bands of All Time	Placed	
