= Dino (South Korean singer) =

South Korean singer and rapper (born 1999)

- 디노
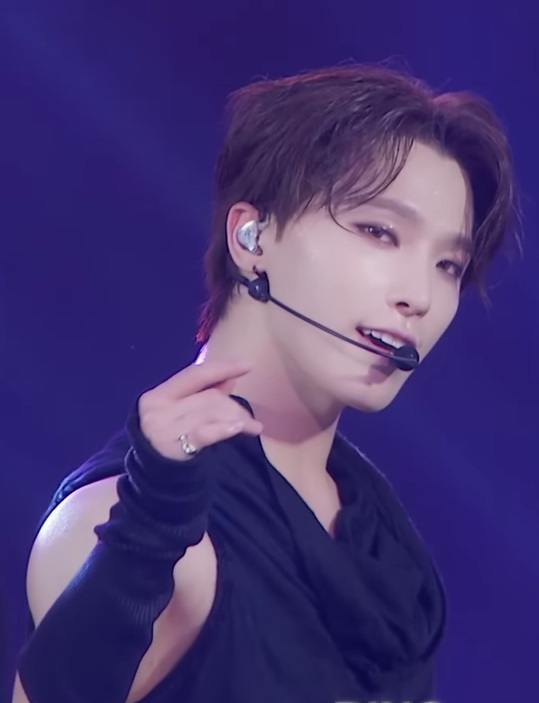
- Dino in October 2024
- Born: Lee Chan; 11 February 1999 (age 27); Iksan, South Korea
- Other name: Picheolin
- Occupations: Singer; dancer; rapper
- Musical career
- Genre: K-pop
- Instrument: Vocals
- Years active: 2015–present
- Label: Pledis
- Member of: Seventeen

Korean name
- Hangul: 이찬
- RR: I Chan
- MR: I Ch'an

Lee Chan (Korean: 이찬), known by his stage name Dino (디노), is a South Korean singer, dancer and rapper. Managed by Pledis Entertainment, he is a member of the South Korean boy band Seventeen and its performance team. Dino made his solo debut with "Wait" on November 27, 2023. Dino also has a middle-aged alter ego named Picheolin (피철인).

== Early life and education ==
Lee Chan was born on February 11, 1999, in Iksan, North Jeolla, South Korea. He attended Seoul Broadcasting High School and graduated in 2017.

== Career ==
=== 2006-2014: Early appearances and pre-debut activities ===
Lee Chan trained at his father's dance academy, whose dance crew, IS Crew, traveled nationwide for dance competitions. He attended the Jeonju Youth Dance Competition and won the grand prize. He was cast there by a Pledis representative.

Before joining Pledis Entertainment, Lee Chan appeared on SBS's Live Today 1 and Truth Game in 2006, later appeared on KBS's Show Power Video, and auditioned on MBC's Star Audition: The Great Birth 2 in 2011.

In 2012, Lee Chan joined Pledis Entertainment, for training in singing and dancing. As a trainee, he was a part of Seventeen TV from its inception, an online reality show that introduced Pledis' trainees and showed potential members of the boy group Seventeen before their official debut. The show was broadcast periodically on Ustream, where the trainees showed themselves training, singing, creating choreographies and playing games. The online show also included participation in concerts, titled Like Seventeen.

=== 2015–present: Seventeen and solo activities ===
In 2015, Dino debuted as a member of the South Korean boy group Seventeen with the extended play 17 Carat on May 26. In 2017, following his graduation from high school, Dino released his first solo song, "0 (Zero)", on SoundCloud. It was written by himself and composed by Bumzu. At the end of 2017 he released another song, "The Real Thing", again a collaboration with Bumzu.

Since 2018, Dino has released a series of dance videos under the name Dino's Danceology, choreographed himself. The series has 11 entries as of 2024, including 5 Seconds of Summer's "Thin White Lines" and Josef Salvat's "call on me". At Seventeen's 2021 Power of Love online concert, Dino debuted his third solo song, "Last Order". In June 2022, he released a digital song named "High-Five", written by himself and produced alongside Prismfilter's Hey Farmer.

In 2023, Dino and bandmate Jeonghan were cast in MBC every1's reality show Magic Lamp (요술램프) alongside Kim Jae-joong, Kang Hui, Lee Joo-ahn, Junpi, and Tan. In August 2023, alongside bandmates DK and Joshua, Dino was featured on New Kids On The Block's remix to their 2008 song "Dirty Dancing", released as a part of a commemoration of the 15th anniversary of the album The Block's release. In October 2023, Dino released his first OST song, participating in the soundtrack for television series Castaway Diva with the song "Icarus". On November 17, Pledis announced that Dino would be releasing his first solo song to streaming platforms, titled "Wait". It was released November 27.

In January 2024, Dino was announced as the new presenter of Tokyo FM's School of Lock program, a role previously held by his bandmate Jeonghan. In July 2025, he was invited to sing the official anthem of the 2025 Esports World Cup alongside American rapper Duckwrth and American metalcore band The Word Alive. The song, "Til My Fingers Bleed", was released on July 7, and the three acts performed it together at the opening ceremony in Riyadh on July 10.

On July 13, 2026, he released "Beyond the Dream" for the soundtrack of the ENA television series Dream to You.

=== 2026–present: Picheolin's debut ===
Picheolin first appeared in 2021, originating from a skit played during Seventeen's 5th fanmeet. Picheolin, a play on the word 'Featuring', is introduced as a nosy 58-year-old man from the countryside, clad with his signature eyewear, usually sunglasses. The character eventually reappeared in the Going Seventeen episode 54–55 with the catchphrase "Eyes of love" (사랑의 눈빛). In October 2023, Picheolin starred as the main character of the Going Seventeen special about "God of Light Music", as the CEO of fictional entertainment agency BOMG, specializing in 90's retro pop. At the 38th Golden Disc Awards, Picheolin made his stage debut, performing "Fighting" with BSS, replacing Lee Young-ji's rap verse.

On 3 August 2026, as Picheolin, Dino released his first solo EP Gilboard (吉Board) with lead single "Party Rock Rock" (놀아보세).

== Other ventures ==
=== Fashion and endorsements ===
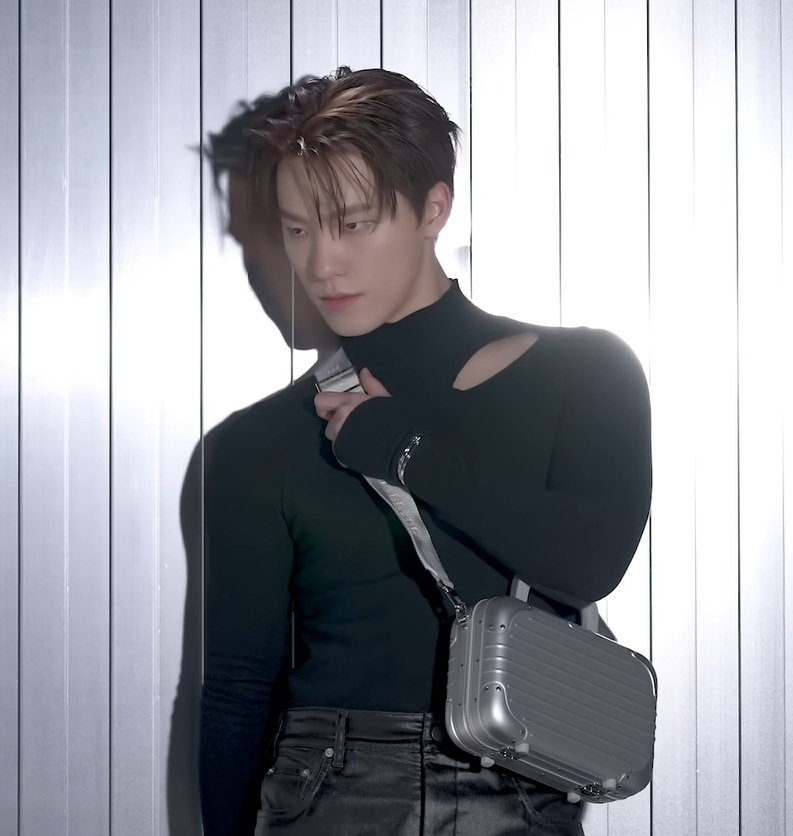
Dino for Rimowa in 2024

In September 2022, Dino and bandmate Vernon were selected as ambassadors for French pharmaceutical company Bioderma. The announcement was seven months after Dino had first worked with the brand, when he was featured in Elle Korea promoting its skincare. In March 2024, he was invited to attend Off-White's Fall/Winter 2024 show in at Paris Fashion Week. In September 2024, Dino and S.Coups were featured in a pictorial in W Korea to promote German luggage brand Rimowa.

== Discography ==
=== Korean extended plays ===
Title	Details	Peak chart positions		Sales	Notes
Title	Details	KOR	JPN	Sales	Notes
Gilboard (吉Board)	Released: August 3, 2026; Label: Pledis Entertainment; Formats: Cassette tape, CD, digital download, streaming, USB; Track listing: 1. "Zzan" (짠) (feat. Dino); 2. "Party Rock Rock" (놀아보세); 3. "Sincerely" (정말); 4. "Mi-cheo Mi-cheo" (미쳐 미쳐); 5. "Love Sick" (아프지 않은 이별은 없다); 6. "For Jeong and Love" (정으로 사랑으로); 7. "Like It" (as Dino); 8. "Wait" (CD only)	3	5	KOR: 203,274; JPN: 10,080	Credited as Picheolin

=== Singles ===
==== As lead or featured artist ====
Title	Year	Peak chart positions	Album
Title	Year	KOR	Album
"0 (Zero)"	2017	—	Non-album singles
"The Real Thing"	2018	—	Non-album singles
"Last Order"	2021	—	Non-album singles
"High-Five"	2022	—	Non-album singles
"Dirty Dancing" (Dem Jointz Remix) New Kids on the Block with Joshua, DK and Dino	2023	—	The Block 2023 Rerelease
"Wait"	2023	—	Non-album single
"Party Rock Rock" (놀아보세)	2026	131	吉Board
"—" denotes a recording that did not chart or was not released in that territory

=== Other charted songs ===
Title	Year	Peak chart positions	Album
Title	Year	KOR	Album
"Trigger" (Note: Credited under Seventeen but is a solo track performed by Dino.)	2025	120	Happy Burstday

==== Soundtrack appearances ====
Title	Year	Peak chart positions	Album
Title	Year	KOR	Album
"A-Teen" (with Joshua, Hoshi, Woozi and Vernon)	2017	17	A-Teen OST
"Icarus" (이카루스)	2023	— (Note: "Icarus" did not chart on the Circle Digital Chart but peaked at 136 on the Downloads Chart.)	Castaway Diva OST
"Til My Fingers Bleed" (with Duckwrth and The World Alive)	2025	—	2025 Esports World Cup Official Anthem
"Beyond the Dream"	2026	—	Dream to You, Pt. 1 (Original Soundtrack)
"—" denotes a recording that did not chart or was not released in that territory

=== Composition credits ===
All credits are adapted from the Korea Music Copyright Association unless stated otherwise.

Year	Artist	Song	Album	Lyrics		Music		Ref.
Year	Artist	Song	Album	Credited	With	Credited	With	Ref.
2015	Seventeen	"Jam Jam"; Performance unit + Vernon	17 Carat	Yes	Woozi, Hoshi, Vernon	No	—N/a	
2015	Seventeen	"OMG"	Boys Be	Yes	Woozi	No	—N/a	
2016	Seventeen	"Chuck" (엄지척)	Love & Letter	Yes	Woozi, S.Coups, Wonwoo, Mingyu, Vernon	No	—N/a	
2016	Seventeen	"Hit Song" (유행가)	Love & Letter	Yes	Bumzu, S.Coups, Mingyu, Vernon	No	—N/a	
2016	Seventeen	"Healing" (힐링)	Love & Letter Repackage Album	Yes	Woozi, S.Coups, Mingyu, Vernon	No	—N/a	
2016	Seventeen	"Beautiful"; Performed by Joshua, Hoshi, DK, Mingyu, The8, Dino	Going Seventeen	Yes	Woozi, Bumzu, Mingyu	No	—N/a	
2016	Seventeen	"Highlight"; Performance Unit	Going Seventeen	Yes	Bumzu, Hoshi, Jun, The8, Lee Yoo-jung	No	—N/a	
2017	Dino	"0" (Zero)	Non-album single	Yes	Bumzu	Yes	Bumzu	
2017	Seventeen	"Swimming Fool"; Performance Unit	Al1	Yes	Woozi, Vernon, Bumzu	No	—N/a	
2017	Seventeen	"Who"; Performance Unit	Al1	Yes	Hoshi	No	—N/a	
2017	Seventeen	"Without You" (모자를 눌러 쓰고)	Teen, Age	Yes	Woozi, Vernon, S.Coups, Jeonghan, Hoshi, The8, Mingyu, DK, Bumzu	No	—N/a	
2017	Seventeen	"Lilili Yabbay" (13월의 춤); Performance Unit	Teen, Age	Yes	Woozi, Bumzu	No	—N/a	
2017	Seventeen	"Flower"	Teen, Age	Yes	S.Coups, Wonwoo, The8, Seungkwan, Jeonghan, Woozi, Bumzu	No	—N/a	
2018	Dino	"The Real Thing"	Non-album single	Yes	—N/a	No	—N/a	
2018	Seventeen	"A-Teen"	A-Teen OST	Yes	Bumzu, Woozi, Vernon	No	—N/a	
2018	Seventeen	"Moonwalker"; Performance Unit	You Make My Day	Yes	Woozi, Bumzu, Hoshi	No	—N/a	
2019	Seventeen	"Shhh"; Performance Unit	You Made My Dawn	Yes	Bumzu, Hoshi	No	—N/a	
2020	Seventeen	"Do Re Mi" (도레미); Performed by Seungkwan, Vernon, Dino	Semicolon	Yes	Woozi, Bumzu, Seungkwan, Vernon	No	—N/a	
2021	Seventeen	"Wave"; Performance Unit	Your Choice	Yes	Woozi, Bumzu, Hoshi, Jun, The8	No	—N/a	
2021	Seventeen	"In the Soop"	Non-album single	Yes	Woozi, Wonwoo, Hoshi, Mingyu, DK, Jeonghan, Joshua	Yes	Woozi, Hoshi	
2021	Seventeen	"Pang!"; Performance Unit	Attacca	Yes	Woozi, Bumzu, Hoshi	Yes	Woozi, Bumzu, Poptime, Bir$day (Prismfilter), Heyfarmer (Prismfilter)	
	Dino	"Last Order"	Non-album single	Yes	—N/a	Yes	Bumzu, Building Owner	
2022	Seventeen	"Shadow"	Face the Sun	Yes	Woozi, Bumzu, Arcades, Johan Fransson, Ryan Lawrie, Matt Thomson, Max Lynedoch Graham, Gabriel Brandes	Yes	Woozi, Bumzu, Arcades, Johan Fransson, Ryan Lawrie, Matt Thomson, Max Lynedoch Graham, Gabriel Brandes	
2022	Dino	"High Five"	Non-album single	Yes	—N/a	Yes	Hey Farmer	
2022	Seventeen	"Fallin' Flower" (Korean version)	Sector 17	Yes	Woozi, Bumzu, Park Gi-tae	No	—N/a	
2023	Seventeen	"I Don't Understand but I Luv U"; Performance Unit	FML	Yes	Woozi, Bumzu, Hoshi	No	—N/a	
2023	Dino	"Wait"	Non-album single	Yes	Woozi	Yes	Woozi, Ohway!	
2024	Seventeen	"Spell"; Performance Unit	17 Is Right Here	Yes	The8	No	—N/a	
2024	Seventeen	"Rain"; Performance Unit	Spill The Feels	Yes	Bumzu, Woozi, Hoshi	No	—N/a	
2025	Seventeen	"Encircled"	Non-album single	Yes	S.Coups, Woozi, Wonwoo, Hoshi, Vernon, Mingyu, Dokyeom, Seungkwan, Jun, The8, Joshua	No	—N/a	
2025	Seventeen	"Trigger"; Dino solo	Happy Burstday	Yes	—N/a	No	—N/a	
