= Circle Album Chart =

South Korean music albums chart

The Circle Album Chart (Korean: 써클 앨범 차트), previously known as the Gaon Album Chart (가온 앨범 차트), is a record chart ranking the 100 most popular albums, extended plays and single albums in South Korea–based on their physical sales. It is a part of the Circle Chart, previously known as the Gaon Chart. It compiles shipments in weekly, monthly, and year-end formats with detailed album sales.

== History ==
The Gaon Album Chart was launched as a part of the Gaon Chart in February 2010 by the Korea Music Content Association and South Korea's Ministry of Culture, Sports and Tourism.

In February 2011, Gaon Chart published information on both online and offline album sales of 2010, including a detailed breakdown of online chart data, and was the first time that offline album sales were released since 2008 when the Music Industry Association of Korea stopped compiling data.

In July 2022, Gaon Chart was rebranded as Circle Chart with a reformation in the album chart that would also provide weekly physical album sales data in addition to monthly and yearly sales data.

== Number-one albums ==
- 2010
- 2011
- 2012
- 2013
- 2014
- 2015
- 2016
- 2017
- 2018
- 2019
- 2020
- 2021
- 2022
- 2023
- 2024
- 2025
- 2026

== Best-selling albums ==
2010

2010 Yearly Top 10 Best-Selling Albums
#	Album	Artist	Label	Total sales	Format
1	Bonamana	Super Junior	SM Entertainment	200,193	Studio album
2	Oh!	Girls' Generation	SM Entertainment	197,934	Studio album
3	Hoot	Girls' Generation	SM Entertainment	163,066	EP
4	Run Devil Run	Girls' Generation	SM Entertainment	136,851	Repackage
5	GD & TOP	GD & TOP	YG Entertainment	130,000	Studio album
6	Lucifer	Shinee	SM Entertainment	124,961	Studio album
7	To Anyone	2NE1	YG Entertainment	122,845	Studio album
8	The Beginning	JYJ	C-JeS Entertainment	99,903	Studio album
9	Bonamana (Version C)	Super Junior	SM Entertainment	99,355	Repackage
10	The Beginning (New Limited Edition)	JYJ	C-JeS Entertainment	98,311	Studio album

2011

2011 Yearly Top 10 Best-Selling Albums
#	Album	Artist	Label	Total sales	Format
1	The Boys	Girls' Generation	SM Entertainment	385,348	Studio album
2	Mr. Simple	Super Junior	SM Entertainment	343,348	Studio album
3	Keep Your Head Down	TVXQ	SM Entertainment	263,412	Studio album
4	In Heaven	JYJ	C-JeS Entertainment	220,442	Studio album
5	Fiction and Fact	Beast	Cube Entertainment	142,272	Studio album
6	Tonight	Big Bang	YG Entertainment	136,594	EP
7	A-Cha	Super Junior	SM Entertainment	129,894	Repackage
8	First Step	CNBLUE	FNC Music	115,467	Studio album
9	Break Down	Kim Hyun-joong	KeyEast	114,642	EP
10	Lucky	Kim Hyun-joong	KeyEast	101,705	EP

2012

2012 Yearly Top 10 Best-Selling Albums
#	Album	Artist	Label	Total sales	Format
1	Sexy, Free & Single	Super Junior	SM Entertainment	356,431	Studio album
2	Alive	Big Bang	YG Entertainment	266,848	EP
3	Catch Me	TVXQ	SM Entertainment	256,447	Studio album
4	One of a Kind	G-Dragon	YG Entertainment	204,326	EP
5	Sherlock	Shinee	SM Entertainment	181,415	EP
6	Still Alive (Special Edition)	Big Bang	YG Entertainment	148,030	EP
7	Mama	Exo-K	SM Entertainment	145,925	EP
8	Twinkle	Girls' Generation-TTS	SM Entertainment	144,222	EP
9	Midnight Sun	Beast	Cube Entertainment	144,175	EP
10	Infinitize	Infinite	Woollim Entertainment	140,277	EP

2013

2013 Yearly Top 10 Best-Selling Albums
#	Album	Artist	Label	Total sales	Format
1	Growl (Kiss Version)	Exo	SM Entertainment	335,823	Repackage
2	I Got a Boy	Girls' Generation	SM Entertainment	293,302	Studio album
3	XOXO (Kiss Version)	Exo	SM Entertainment	269,597	Studio album
4	Miracles in December (Korean Version)	Exo	SM Entertainment	262,825	EP
5	Hello	Cho Yong-pil	Pil Records	250,046	Studio album
6	XOXO (Hug Version - Chinese Version)	Exo	SM Entertainment	200,870	Studio album
7	Growl (Hug Version)	Exo	SM Entertainment	200,183	Repackage
8	Coup d'etat	G-Dragon	YG Entertainment	195,603	Studio album
9	Dream Girl – The Misconceptions of You	Shinee	SM Entertainment	185,357	Studio album
10	Miracles in December (Chinese Version)	Exo	SM Entertainment	171,546	EP

2014

2014 Yearly Top 10 Best-Selling Albums
#	Album	Artist	Label	Total sales	Format
1	Overdose (Korean Version)	Exo-K	SM Entertainment	385,047	EP
2	Overdose (Chinese Version)	Exo-M	SM Entertainment	272,718	EP
3	Mamacita	Super Junior	SM Entertainment	265,781	Studio album
4	Tense	TVXQ	SM Entertainment	196,971	Studio album
5	Mr.Mr.	Girls' Generation	SM Entertainment	163,209	EP
6	Just Us	JYJ	C-JeS Entertainment	154,804	Studio album
7	Season 2	Infinite	Woollim Entertainment	152,479	Studio album
8	This Is Love (Special Edition)	Super Junior	SM Entertainment	143,515	Repackage
9	Good Luck	Beast	Cube Entertainment	134,449	EP
10	Who Am I	B1A4	WM Entertainment	126,561	Studio album

2015

2015 Yearly Top 10 Best-Selling Albums
#	Album	Artist	Label	Total sales	Format
1	Exodus (Korean Version)	Exo	SM Entertainment	478,856	Studio album
2	Sing For You (Korean Version)	Exo	SM Entertainment	318,698	EP
3	Love Me Right (Korean Version)	Exo	SM Entertainment	299,623	Repackage
4	Exodus (Chinese Version)	Exo	SM Entertainment	281,320	Studio album
5	The Most Beautiful Moment in Life, Pt. 2	BTS	Big Hit Entertainment	274,135	EP
6	The Most Beautiful Moment in Life, Pt. 1	BTS	Big Hit Entertainment	203,664	EP
7	Sing For You (Chinese Version)	Exo	SM Entertainment	176,239	EP
8	Odd	Shinee	SM Entertainment	172,999	Studio album
9	Devil	Super Junior	SM Entertainment	167,742	Compilation album
10	Rise as God	TVXQ	SM Entertainment	151,625	Studio album

2016

2016 Yearly Top 10 Best-Selling Albums
#	Album	Artist	Label	Total sales	Format
1	Wings	BTS	Big Hit Entertainment	751,301	Studio album
2	Ex'Act	Exo	SM Entertainment	549,378	Studio album
3	For Life	Exo	SM Entertainment	438,481	EP
4	The Most Beautiful Moment in Life: Young Forever	BTS	Big Hit Entertainment	368,369	Compilation album
5	Twicecoaster: Lane 1	Twice	JYP Entertainment	350,852	EP
6	Hey Mama!	Exo-CBX	SM Entertainment	275,191	EP
7	Lose Control	Lay	SM Entertainment	274,238	EP
8	Ex'Act (Chinese Version)	Exo	SM Entertainment	247,899	Studio album
9	Lotto (Korean Version)	Exo	SM Entertainment	232,564	Repackage
10	Flight Log: Turbulence	Got7	JYP Entertainment	225,617	Studio album

2017

2017 Yearly Top 10 Best-Selling Albums
#	Album	Artist	Label	Total sales	Format
1	Love Yourself: Her	BTS	Big Hit Entertainment	1,493,443	EP
2	The War (Korean Version)	Exo	SM Entertainment	949,827	Studio album
3	You Never Walk Alone	BTS	Big Hit Entertainment	768,402	Repackage
4	1X1=1 (To Be One)	Wanna One	YMC Entertainment	741,546	EP
5	1-1=0 (Nothing Without You)	Wanna One	YMC Entertainment	614,072	Repackage
6	Universe	Exo	SM Entertainment	516,062	EP
7	The Power of Music (Korean Version)	Exo	SM Entertainment	455,269	Repackage
8	7 for 7	Got7	JYP Entertainment	368,589	EP
9	Teen, Age	Seventeen	Pledis Entertainment	357,296	Studio album
10	Flight Log: Arrival	Got7	JYP Entertainment	334,316	EP

2018

2018 Yearly Top 10 Best-Selling Albums
#	Album	Artist	Label	Total sales	Format
1	Love Yourself: Answer	BTS	Big Hit Entertainment	2,197,808	Compilation album
2	Love Yourself: Tear	BTS	Big Hit Entertainment	1,849,537	Studio album
3	Don't Mess Up My Tempo	Exo	SM Entertainment	1,452,030	Studio album
4	0+1=1 (I Promise You)	Wanna One	Swing Entertainment	782,562	EP
5	1÷x=1 (Undivided)	Wanna One	Swing Entertainment	641,131	EP
6	1¹¹=1 (Power of Destiny)	Wanna One	Swing Entertainment	605,128	Studio album
7	Love Shot	Exo	SM Entertainment	499,849	Repackage
8	You Make My Day	Seventeen	Pledis Entertainment	389,937	EP
9	Blooming Days	Exo-CBX	SM Entertainment	363,567	EP
10	What Is Love?	Twice	JYP Entertainment	348,797	EP

2019

2019 Yearly Top 10 Best-Selling Albums
#	Album	Artist	Label	Total sales	Format
1	Map of the Soul: Persona	BTS	Big Hit Entertainment	3,718,230	EP
2	An Ode	Seventeen	Pledis Entertainment	858,872	Studio album
3	Obsession	Exo	SM Entertainment	766,294	Studio album
4	Emergency: Quantum Leap	X1	Swing Entertainment	580,573	EP
5	BTS World: Original Soundtrack	BTS	Big Hit Entertainment	553,364	Soundtrack album
6	City Lights	Baekhyun	SM Entertainment	525,935	EP
7	Color on Me	Kang Daniel	Konnect Entertainment	500,134	EP
8	You Made My Dawn	Seventeen	Pledis Entertainment	475,998	EP
9	Time Slip	Super Junior	SM Entertainment	427,647	Studio album
10	Feel Special	Twice	JYP Entertainment	413,459	EP

2020

2020 Yearly Top 10 Best-Selling Albums
#	Album	Artist	Label	Total sales	Format
1	Map of the Soul: 7	BTS	Big Hit Entertainment	4,376,975	Studio album
2	Be	BTS	Big Hit Entertainment	2,692,022	Studio album
3	Heng:garæ	Seventeen	Pledis Entertainment	1,377,813	EP
4	NCT Resonance Pt. 1	NCT	SM Entertainment	1,289,594	Studio album
5	The Album	Blackpink	YG Entertainment	1,244,802	Studio album
6	Semicolon	Seventeen	Pledis Entertainment	1,122,850	EP
7	Delight	Baekhyun	SM Entertainment	971,554	EP
8	Neo Zone	NCT 127	SM Entertainment	836,779	Studio album
9	NCT Resonance Pt. 2	NCT	SM Entertainment	791,590	Studio album
10	Skool Luv Affair Special Addition	BTS	Big Hit Entertainment	670,500	Repackage

2021

2021 Yearly Top 10 Best-Selling Albums
#	Album	Artist	Label	Total sales	Format
1	Butter	BTS	Big Hit Music	2,999,407	Single album
2	Sticker	NCT 127	SM Entertainment	2,427,559	Studio album
3	Hot Sauce	NCT Dream	SM Entertainment	2,097,185	Studio album
4	Attacca	Seventeen	Pledis Entertainment	2,059,073	EP
5	Universe	NCT	SM Entertainment	1,630,715	Studio album
6	Your Choice	Seventeen	Pledis Entertainment	1,462,405	EP
7	Don't Fight the Feeling	Exo	SM Entertainment	1,326,189	EP
8	Noeasy	Stray Kids	JYP Entertainment	1,303,106	Studio album
9	Dimension: Dilemma	Enhypen	Belift Lab	1,205,949	Studio album
10	Be	BTS	Big Hit Entertainment	1,049,496	Studio album

2022

2022 Yearly Top 10 Best-Selling Albums
#	Album	Artist	Label	Total sales	Format
1	Proof	BTS	Big Hit Music	3,482,598	Anthology
2	Maxident	Stray Kids	JYP Entertainment	3,176,233	EP
3	Face the Sun	Seventeen	Pledis Entertainment	2,867,353	Studio album
4	Born Pink	Blackpink	YG Entertainment	2,522,941	Studio album
5	Glitch Mode	NCT Dream	SM Entertainment	2,095,544	Studio album
6	2 Baddies	NCT 127	SM Entertainment	1,825,170	Studio album
7	Minisode 2: Thursday's Child	TXT	Big Hit Music	1,806,679	EP
8	Girls	Aespa	SM Entertainment	1,803,050	EP
9	Oddinary	Stray Kids	JYP Entertainment	1,762,168	EP
10	After Like	Ive	Starship Entertainment	1,652,402	Single album

2023

2023 Yearly Top 10 Best-Selling Albums
#	Album	Artist	Label	Total sales	Format
1	FML	Seventeen	Pledis Entertainment	5,546,930	EP
2	5-Star	Stray Kids	JYP Entertainment	5,246,998	Studio album
3	Seventeenth Heaven	Seventeen	Pledis Entertainment	4,807,288	EP
4	Rock-Star	Stray Kids	JYP Entertainment	3,992,703	EP
5	ISTJ	NCT Dream	SM Entertainment	3,369,118	Studio album
6	The Name Chapter: Temptation	TXT	Big Hit Music	2,868,866	EP
7	The Name Chapter: Freefall	TXT	Big Hit Music	2,352,891	Studio album
8	Golden	Jung Kook	Big Hit Music	2,208,348	Studio album
9	My World	Aespa	SM Entertainment	2,050,530	EP
10	Youth in the Shade	Zerobaseone	WakeOne	2,037,790	EP

2024

2024 Yearly Top 10 Best-Selling Albums
#	Album	Artist	Label	Total sales	Format
1	Spill the Feels	Seventeen	Pledis Entertainment	3,180,338	EP
2	17 Is Right Here	Seventeen	Pledis Entertainment	3,153,616	Compilation album
3	Ate	Stray Kids	JYP Entertainment	2,880,052	EP
4	Romance: Untold	Enhypen	Belift Lab	2,402,335	Studio album
5	Dream()scape	NCT Dream	SM Entertainment	2,208,837	EP
6	Hop	Stray Kids	JYP Entertainment	2,041,231	Mixtape
7	Minisode 3: Tomorrow	TXT	Big Hit Music	1,716,505	EP
8	The Star Chapter: Sanctuary	TXT	Big Hit Music	1,665,335	EP
9	Ive Switch	Ive	Starship Entertainment	1,665,125	EP
10	Dreamscape	NCT Dream	SM Entertainment	1,407,843	Studio album

2025

2025 Yearly Top 10 Best-Selling Albums
#	Album	Artist	Label	Total sales	Format
1	Karma	Stray Kids	JYP Entertainment	3,397,810	Studio album
2	Happy Burstday	Seventeen	Pledis Entertainment	2,559,694	Studio album
3	Do It	Stray Kids	JYP Entertainment	2,314,271	Mixtape
4	Desire: Unleash	Enhypen	Belift Lab	2,166,881	EP
5	The Star Chapter: Together	TXT	Big Hit Music	1,801,907	Studio album
6	Never Say Never	Zerobaseone	WakeOne	1,456,708	Studio album
7	Ive Empathy	Ive	Starship Entertainment	1,425,261	EP
8	Odyssey	Riize	SM Entertainment	1,412,159	Studio album
9	Color	NCT Wish	SM Entertainment	1,366,466	EP
10	Back to Life	&Team	YX Labels	1,331,733	EP

== Achievements by artists ==
Most albums in the Yearly Top 10 Best Selling Album List

Total albums	Artist	Album	Year released
22	Exo	XOXO (Kiss Version)	2013
22	Exo	XOXO (Hug Version)	2013
22	Exo	XOXO (Repackage Edition) (Kiss Version)	2013
22	Exo	XOXO (Repackage Edition) (Hug Version)	2013
22	Exo	Miracles in December (Korean Version)	2013
22	Exo	Miracles in December (Chinese Version)	2013
22	Exo	Exodus (Korean Version)	2015
22	Exo	Exodus (Chinese Version)	2015
22	Exo	Love Me Right (Korean Version)	2015
22	Exo	Sing For You (Korean Version)	2015
22	Exo	Sing For You (Chinese Version)	2015
22	Exo	Ex'Act (Korean Version)	2016
22	Exo	For Life	2016
22	Exo	Ex'Act (Chinese Version)	2016
22	Exo	Lotto (Korean Version)	2016
22	Exo	The War (Korean Version)	2017
22	Exo	The Power Of Music (Korean Version)	2017
22	Exo	Universe	2017
22	Exo	Don't Mess Up My Tempo	2018
22	Exo	Love Shot	2018
22	Exo	Obsession	2019
22	Exo	Don't Fight the Feeling	2021
16	BTS	The Most Beautiful Moment in Life, Pt. 1	2015
16	BTS	The Most Beautiful Moment in Life, Pt. 2	2015
16	BTS	Wings	2016
16	BTS	The Most Beautiful Moment In Life: Young Forever	2016
16	BTS	You Never Walk Alone	2017
16	BTS	Love Yourself: Her	2017
16	BTS	Love Yourself: Answer	2018
16	BTS	Love Yourself: Tear	2018
16	BTS	Map of the Soul: Persona	2019
16	BTS	BTS World: Original Soundtrack	2019
16	BTS	Map of the Soul: 7	2020
16	BTS	Skool Luv Affair Special Addition	2020
16	BTS	Be	2020
16	BTS	Butter	2021
16	BTS	Be	2021
16	BTS	Proof	2022
11	Seventeen	Teen, Age	2017
11	Seventeen	You Make My Day	2018
11	Seventeen	You Made My Dawn	2019
11	Seventeen	An Ode	2019
11	Seventeen	Heng:garæ	2020
11	Seventeen	Semicolon	2020
11	Seventeen	Your Choice	2021
11	Seventeen	Attacca	2021
11	Seventeen	Face the Sun	2022
11	Seventeen	FML	2023
11	Seventeen	Seventeenth Heaven	2023
9	Super Junior	Bonamana	2010
9	Super Junior	Bonamana (Repackaged)	2010
9	Super Junior	Mr. Simple	2011
9	Super Junior	A-Cha	2011
9	Super Junior	Sexy, Free & Single	2012
9	Super Junior	Mamacita	2014
9	Super Junior	This Is Love	2014
9	Super Junior	Devil	2015
9	Super Junior	Time Slip	2019
6	Girls' Generation	Oh!	2010
6	Girls' Generation	Hoot	2010
6	Girls' Generation	Run Devil Run	2010
6	Girls' Generation	The Boys	2011
6	Girls' Generation	I Got a Boy	2013
6	Girls' Generation	Mr.Mr.	2014

Most number one albums

Total albums	Artist	Album	Year released	Ref.
19	Seventeen	Love&Letter	2016	
19	Seventeen	Love&Letter Repackage Album	2016	
19	Seventeen	Going Seventeen	2016	
19	Seventeen	Al1	2017	
19	Seventeen	Teen, Age	2017	
19	Seventeen	Director's Cut	2018	
19	Seventeen	You Make My Day	2018	
19	Seventeen	You Made My Dawn	2019	
19	Seventeen	An Ode	2019	
19	Seventeen	Heng:garæ	2020	
19	Seventeen	Semicolon	2020	
19	Seventeen	Your Choice	2021	
19	Seventeen	Attacca	2021	
19	Seventeen	Face the Sun	2022	
19	Seventeen	Sector 17	2022	
19	Seventeen	FML	2023	
19	Seventeen	Seventeenth Heaven	2023	
19	Seventeen	17 Is Right Here	2024	
19	Seventeen	Spill the Feels	2024	
18	Exo	XOXO (Kiss Version)	2013	
18	Exo	XOXO (Repackage Edition) (Kiss Version)	2013	
18	Exo	Miracles in December (Korean Version)	2013	
18	Exo	Exology Chapter 1: The Lost Planet	2015	
18	Exo	Exodus (Korean Version)	2015	
18	Exo	Love Me Right (Korean Version)	2015	
18	Exo	Sing For You (Korean Version)	2015	
18	Exo	Ex'Act (Korean Version)	2016	
18	Exo	Lotto (Korean Version)	2016	
18	Exo	For Life	2016	
18	Exo	The War (Korean Version)	2017	
18	Exo	The Power Of Music (Korean Version)	2017	
18	Exo	Universe	2017	
18	Exo	Don't Mess Up My Tempo	2018	
18	Exo	Love Shot	2018	
18	Exo	Obsession	2019	
18	Exo	Don't Fight the Feeling	2021	
18	Exo	Exist	2023	
16	BTS	Skool Luv Affair	2014	
16	BTS	Skool Luv Affair Special Addition	2014	
16	BTS	The Most Beautiful Moment in Life, Pt. 1	2015	
16	BTS	The Most Beautiful Moment in Life, Pt. 2	2015	
16	BTS	The Most Beautiful Moment in Life: Young Forever	2016	
16	BTS	Wings	2016	
16	BTS	You Never Walk Alone	2017	
16	BTS	Love Yourself: Her	2017	
16	BTS	Love Yourself: Tear	2018	
16	BTS	Love Yourself: Answer	2018	
16	BTS	Map of the Soul: Persona	2019	
16	BTS	BTS World: Original Soundtrack	2019	
16	BTS	Map of the Soul: 7	2020	
16	BTS	Be	2020	
16	BTS	Butter	2021	
16	BTS	Proof	2022	
15	Super Junior	Bonamana	2010	
15	Super Junior	Bonamana (Repackaged)	2010	
15	Super Junior	Mr. Simple	2011	
15	Super Junior	A-Cha	2011	
15	Super Junior	Sexy, Free & Single	2012	
15	Super Junior	Spy	2012	
15	Super Junior	Mamacita	2014	
15	Super Junior	This Is Love	2014	
15	Super Junior	Magic	2015	
15	Super Junior	Play (Pause Version)	2017	
15	Super Junior	Time Slip	2019	
15	Super Junior	Timeless	2020	
15	Super Junior	The Renaissance	2021	
15	Super Junior	The Road: Winter for Spring	2022	
15	Super Junior	The Road: Celebration	2022	
14	Shinee	Lucifer	2010	
14	Shinee	Hello	2010	
14	Shinee	Sherlock	2012	
14	Shinee	Chapter 1. Dream Girl – The Misconceptions of You	2013	
14	Shinee	Chapter 2. Why So Serious? – The Misconceptions of Me	2013	
14	Shinee	Everybody	2013	
14	Shinee	Odd	2015	
14	Shinee	Married to the Music	2015	
14	Shinee	1 of 1	2016	
14	Shinee	1 and 1	2016	
14	Shinee	The Story of Light EP.1	2018	
14	Shinee	The Story of Light EP.2	2018	
14	Shinee	The Story of Light: Epilogue	2018	
14	Shinee	Don't Call Me	2021	

Most weeks at number one

Total weeks	Artist	Ref.
35	Exo	
32	BTS	
28	Seventeen	
23	Super Junior	
21	Girls' Generation	

Most months at number one

Total months	Artist	Ref.
17	Exo	
15	Seventeen	
14	BTS	
10	Girls' Generation	
9	Super Junior	

Most consecutive weeks at number one

Total weeks	Artist	Album	Year	Ref.
4	Exo	Exodus (Korean Version)	2015	
3	2PM	01:59PM	2010	
3	Girls' Generation	Oh!	2010	
3	SS501	Destination	2010	
3	Girls' Generation	The Boys	2011	
3	Super Junior	Sexy, Free & Single	2012	
3	TVXQ	Catch Me	2012	
3	Exo	The War (Korean Version)	2017	
3	Wanna One	1X1=1 (To Be One)	2017	
3	Seventeen	You Made My Dawn	2019	
3	BTS	Map of the Soul: Persona	2019	
3	X1	Emergency: Quantum Leap	2019	
3	NCT Dream	Hot Sauce	2021	
3	BTS	Butter	2021	
3	NCT 127	Sticker	2021	

Most consecutive months at number one

Total months	Artist	Album	Year	Ref.
3	Girls' Generation	The Boys	2011	
2	Girls' Generation	Oh!	2010	
2	Exo	Exodus (Korean Version)	2015	
2	Exo	Obsession	2019	
