= Darl+ing =

2022 single by Seventeen

Single by Seventeen

from the album Face the Sun
- Released: April 15, 2022
- Genre: Pop
- Length: 2:56
- Label: Pledis; YG Plus
- Composers: Woozi; Bumzu; Hwang Hyun (Monotree)
- Lyricists: Woozi; Bumzu; Shannon

Seventeen singles chronology
"Power of Love" (2021)	"Darl+ing" (2022)	"Hot" (2022)

Music video
- "Darl+ing" on YouTube

"Darl+ing" is a song by South Korean boy band Seventeen. It was released on April 15, 2022, by Pledis Entertainment through YG Plus. The song is the band's first song fully recorded in English performed by all members of the band. The song also served as a pre-release single for Seventeen's fourth studio album, Face the Sun, and appears as the album's first track.

The pop song is a gift to the band's international fans, with lyrics following a theme of togetherness. While "Darl+ing" received mixed reviews, it was a commercial success, reaching the national charts of nine countries.

== Background ==
Following the conclusion of their "Power of 'Love'" project, the song marks Seventeen's first full-group release in 2022. Previously, as a part of Attacca, their ninth EP, released in May 2021, American-born Seventeen members Vernon and Joshua released "2 Minus 1", a song fully recorded in English. In January 2022, another member, Woozi released his solo song "Ruby", also fully recorded in English, despite not having an English-language background. "Darl+ing" marks Seventeen's first song fully recorded in English performed by all members of the band.

The song marks the beginning of the band's "Team SVT" project, which presents the theme of uniting Seventeen and their fans. The use of the plus sign in the song's title points to the theme of togetherness, with multiple meanings, including the link between the band and their fans, as well as the link between individuals in a relationship. According to band members, the song is dedicated to Seventeen's international fans.

Our international fans, even though they may not understand Korean, love us for who we are and love our music so much, so we just wanted to make a song they can easily listen to and understand.

— Joshua, on the song's motivation, Rolling Stone

== Release and promotion ==
In March, Pledis Entertainment confirmed that Seventeen would release their fourth studio album in May, three years after their previous studio album, An Ode and seven months after their previous EP, Attacca. In early April, Seventeen partnered with Apple for a "Today at Apple" remix session highlighting "Darl+ing" and the band's creative process. As part of the experience, people were able to create their own remixes of the song in GarageBand.

On April 7, Pledis Entertainment released the title of the song, along with its promotional poster and date of release. On the same day, a sunny mood teaser video was released on YouTube. Pastel concept photos were released to tease the song on April 9. On April 13, Seventeen posted a video of text messages with the song's lyrics and a voice message of a 10-second audio snippet of the song. The following day, a teaser video was released on YouTube, featuring short snippets from their music video. The song was released as a digital single on April 15, accompanied by a music video featuring dreamy scenes in a sunlit wheat field and a mystical house.

On the same day as the song's release, Seventeen performed "Darl+ing" on Fresh Out Live. On April 26, the band performed the song on Japanese shows: Sukkiri and CDTV Live! Live!. The song was re-released as the first track on the studio album Face the Sun on May 27. After the release of the album, Seventeen performed "Darl+ing" on several South Korean music shows, including Music Bank and M Countdown. "Darl+ing" also appears as the fifth track of Face the Sun's reissue, Sector 17. A holiday version of the song was released as part of Seventeen's Japanese EP, Dream, on November 9.

== Music and lyrics ==
"Darl+ing"
A 17-second sample of the chorus of "Darl+ing", which shows the song's characteristic guitar and synth sounds.

The song's lyrics were written by Woozi, Bumzu, and Shannon Bae and composed by Woozi, Bumzu and Hwang Hyun of Monotree. Musically, the song was composed in the key of C major at a tempo of 96 beats per minute. The song is characterized by its guitar and synth sounds. In their remix session with Apple, Hoshi revealed that the band "made the melody and rhythm more simple so that the song could reach a wider range of listeners." Lyrically, the song explores the theme of togetherness, with the song opening with the lines: "You know without you, I’m so lonely / When you’re not here, 911 calling.”

== Critical reception ==
The song was met with mixed reviews. Sara Delgado from Teen Vogue likened the song to Seventeen's previous fresh sound, describing the song as "playful and feel good." On the other hand, NME's Abby Webster criticized the song for being "anti-climactic" and being "a tad too muted to strike a chord." The South China Morning Post ranked "Darl+ing" as number three on their list of "15 best K-pop songs of 2022", describing it as a "sweet and uplifting song." Sarina Bhutani from MTV praised the song's musical composition, writing that it "perfectly layers instrumental elements, like plucky acoustic guitars and melodic pianos, with soft electronic sounds to create the sonic equivalent of a warm hug."

== Commercial performance ==
"Darl+ing" marked Seventeen's first entry on the Canadian Digital Song Sales chart, at number 50. The song also marked Seventeen's first entry on Billboard's Malaysia Songs, Taiwan Songs, Philippines Songs, and Vietnam Hot 100 charts. In Japan, the song debuted at 35 on the Oricon Combined Singles chart and charted for three consecutive weeks, reaching its peak of 13 on its second week. On the Japan Hot 200, the song debuted at 15 and charted for 5 weeks. In South Korea, the song debuted on the weekly Circle Digital Chart at number 96, and charted for 20 consecutive weeks, reaching its peak at 54. On the monthly Circle Digital Chart, the song charted for five consecutive months.

== Charts ==
=== Weekly charts ===
Weekly chart performance for "Darl ing"
Chart (2022)	Peak position
Canadian Digital Song Sales (Billboard)	50
Global 200 (Billboard)	78
Japan Hot 100 (Billboard)	15
Japan Combined Singles (Oricon)	13
Malaysia (Billboard)	12
New Zealand Hot Singles (RMNZ)	17
Philippines (Billboard)	15
South Korea (Circle)	54
Taiwan (Billboard)	25
UK Indie Breakers (OCC)	69
Vietnam (Vietnam Hot 100)	64

=== Monthly charts ===
Monthly chart performance for "Darl ing"
Chart (2022)	Position
South Korea (Circle)	72

=== Yearly charts ===
Yearly chart performance for "Darl ing"
Chart (2022)	Position
South Korea (Circle)	195

== Certifications ==
Certifications and sales for "Darl ing"
Region	Certification	Certified units/sales
Streaming
Japan (RIAJ)	Gold	50,000,000^{†}
^{†} Streaming-only figures based on certification alone.

== Release history ==
Release formats for "Darl ing"
Region	Date	Format	Version	Label	Ref.
Various	April 15, 2022	Digital download; streaming	Original	Pledis; YG Plus	
Various	November 9, 2022	Digital download; streaming	Holiday	Pledis; YG Plus	
