= Hot (Seventeen song) =

Single by Seventeen

from the album Face the Sun
- Language: Korean
- Released: May 27, 2022
- Genre: K-pop; hip hop
- Length: 3:17
- Label: Pledis; YG Plus
- Songwriters: Woozi; Bumzu; Dan August Rigo; Ploypaworawan Praison
- Producers: Woozi; Bumzu; Tim Tan; Rigo; Praison; Softserveboy (153/Joombas); Alex Keem (153/Joombas)

Seventeen singles chronology
"Darl+ing" (2022)	"Hot" (2022)	"_World" (2022)

Music video
- "Hot" on YouTube

"Hot" is a song by South Korean boy group Seventeen, released by Pledis Entertainment through YG Plus. It was released as the lead single of their fourth studio album, Face the Sun, on May 27, 2022. Written by Woozi, Bumzu, August Rigo, and Ploypaworawan Praison, the song is characterized by its Western guitar riffs.

The song was met with generally positive reviews, winning two South Korean music program awards and being nominated for the MTV Video Music Awards for Best K-Pop. Commercially, the song charted on the national charts of nine countries, including reaching number three on Billboard's World Digital Song Sales chart and number one on Singapore's Regional chart. The music video also became Seventeen's fastest music video to reach 100 million views.

== Background and release ==
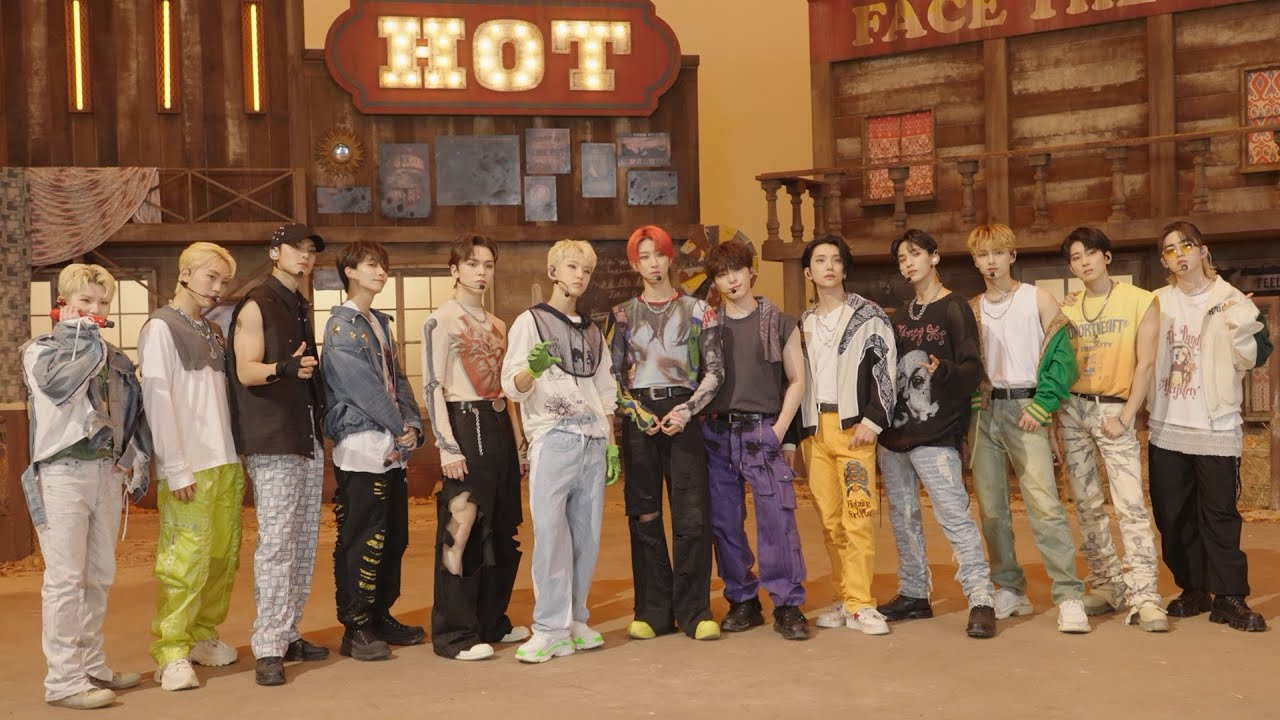
Seventeen on the set of a performance of "Hot", June 2022

In March, seven months after the release of their commercially successful EP Attacca, Pledis Entertainment announced that Seventeen would be releasing a studio album, their first since An Ode (2019), in May. Following the release of the group's first English single "Darl+ing" on April 15, the label confirmed that Seventeen would return on May 27 with their fourth studio album titled Face the Sun. On May 18, the album's track list was released revealing "Hot" as the lead single. Teaser videos were released on the group's YouTube channel on May 24 and May 25, revealing short snippets of the music video.

The group performed the song on South Korean music shows, including Music Bank, M Countdown, and Inkigayo. On August 16, the group performed "Hot" on Jimmy Kimmel Live!, although group member Dino was missing, having contracted COVID-19. The song was also used as their opening performance during the Be The Sun World Tour.

== Composition ==
"Hot"
A 19-second sample of the chorus of "Hot", which shows the song's use of car alarm samples and auto-tune.

"Hot" is characterized by its Western guitar riffs and car alarm samples and features bass, drums and guitar. The song begins with a "Wild West-inspired guitar strum" and also makes use of auto-tune and beatboxing. It is composed in the key of F minor with a tempo of 113 beats per minutes. According to band member Woozi, who was involved in the song’s songwriting and production, the song was the last track to be written on Face the Sun. In a press release, Woozi also noted that he "thought ‘Hot’ expressed exactly what Seventeen is like right now".

== Music video ==
The song's music video is mainly set in a desert and construction site, and includes their intense choreography. It unveils a more mature and ambitious side of the group compared to their previous releases, featuring Vernon holding a smoking bullet in his mouth and The8 flipping knives. The members are shown performing in the desert and on a set with a constructed sun; a giant sun appears near the former setting and the latter explodes as sparks fly. The music video reached 100 million views on YouTube on January 15, becoming the fastest music video for the band to reach the feat.

== Critical reception ==
"Hot" was met with generally positive reviews from music critics. AllMusic's Neil Z. Yeung called the song a standout in the album, describing it as one of the "absolutely rousing doses of energy and catchy hooks". Abby Webster from NME criticized the song for being "overly repetitive", although also writing that it "lazes forward into new territory with its brazen sensuality." Describing the group's performance of the song at the Prudential Center during their world tour, Crystal Bell of Nylon wrote that the song, "with its signature hip swivel and body roll choreography, when combined with the madcap energy of its production, ignited the arena." Teen Vogue included the song in their list of "The 79 Best K-pop Songs of 2022", with Natasha Mulenga writing that the "'Hot' is the song that grips you by the back of your neck, looks you dead in the eye and declares 'I’m the captain now.'" Rolling Stone ranked "Hot" number 38 in their list of the 100 Best Songs of 2022.

== Accolades ==
"Hot" won two first place music program awards on M Countdown and Music Bank on June 2 and 3, 2022, respectively. "Hot" won two awards at the 2022 Asian Pop Music Awards: Top 20 Songs of the Year – Overseas and Best Dance Performance – Overseas. It was also nominated for Best K-Pop at the 2022 MTV Video Music Awards and Song of the Year – May at the Circle Chart Music Awards.

== Charts ==
=== Weekly charts ===
Weekly chart performance for "Hot"
Chart (2022)	Peak position
Global 200 (Billboard)	91
Indonesia (Billboard)	17
Japan (Japan Hot 100)	11
Japan Combined Singles (Oricon)	12
Malaysia (Billboard)	6
Philippines (Billboard)	11
Singapore (RIAS)	7
South Korea (Gaon Digital Chart)	8
Taiwan (Billboard)	13
US World Digital Song Sales (Billboard)	3
Vietnam (Vietnam Hot 100)	38

=== Monthly charts ===
Monthly chart performance for "Hot"
Chart (2022)	Position
South Korea (Circle)	25

=== Year-end charts ===
Year-end chart performance for "Hot"
Chart (2022)	Position
South Korea (Circle)	110

== Certifications ==
Certifications and sales for "Hot"
Region	Certification	Certified units/sales
Streaming
Japan (RIAJ)	Gold	50,000,000^{†}
^{†} Streaming-only figures based on certification alone.
