= Dream (Seventeen EP) =

2022 EP by Seventeen

EP by Seventeen
- Released: November 9, 2022
- Genre: J-pop
- Length: 12:30
- Languages: Japanese; English
- Label: Hybe Labels Japan
- Producers: Woozi; Bumzu

Seventeen chronology
Sector 17 (2022)	Dream (2022)	FML (2023)

Singles from Dream
- 1. "Dream" Released: November 8, 2022

Dream is the third Japanese extended play (EP) and thirteenth overall by South Korean boy band Seventeen. It was released on November 9, 2022, through Hybe Labels Japan. It contains the original song "Dream", the Japanese versions of the two previously released Korean singles "Rock with You" and "All My Love", and the "holiday" version of the English track "Darl+ing". The EP has been marketed as the band's "first" Japanese-language EP despite Seventeen having recorded two previous Japanese EPs, We Make You and 24H, which were officially classified as "mini-albums".

== Composition ==
The lyrics were written by Woozi, Bumzu, and Lee Beom-hun. The lead single "Dream" hints at the group's dream to become stars.

== Promotion ==
To promote the EP, Seventeen toured Japan in November and December 2022, holding concerts at Kyocera Dome, Tokyo Dome, and Vantelin Dome.

== Commercial performance ==
The EP debuted at number one on the Daily Oricon Albums Chart, selling 388,300 copies in its first day. It topped the chart for three days straight, recording 61,065 and 18,312 copies sold in its second and third day. The EP debuted at number one on the Weekly Oricon Albums Chart, having sold 498,000 copies in its first week.

== Critical reception ==
Jashley Ann Cruz of GMA Network wrote, "Seventeen proves they're versatile artists who can dominate every sphere they step on." Cruz commented positively on the lead single "Dream"'s "soft and sweet" choreography and its music video's "dreamy aura", describing the song as "perfect for the upcoming holidays".

== Track listing ==
Dream track listing
No.	Title	Lyrics	Music	Arrangements	Length
1.	"Dream"	Woozi; Bumzu; Lee Beom-hun (Prismfilter)	Woozi; Bumzu; Lee Beom-hun (Prismfilter)	Bumzu; Lee Beom-hun (Prismfilter)	3:05
2.	"Rock with You" (Japanese version)	Woozi; Bumzu; Vernon; Joshua; Kim In-hyun; Jordan Witzigreuter; Cameron Walker; Tim Tan	Woozi; Bumzu; Josh McClelland; Matt Terry; Witzigreuter; Walker; Tan		3:00
3.	"All My Love" (Japanese version)	Woozi; Bumzu; Seungkwan; Vernon	Woozi; Bumzu; Park Ki-tae (Prismfilter)	Bumzu; Park Ki-tae (Prismfilter)	3:21
4.	"Darl+ing" (Holiday version)	Woozi; Bumzu; Shannon	Woozi; Bumzu; Hwang Hyun (MonoTree)	Bumzu; Hwang	2:56

== Charts ==
=== Weekly charts ===
Weekly chart performance
Chart (2022)	Peak position
Japanese Albums (Oricon)	1
Japanese Combined Albums (Oricon)	1
Japanese Hot Albums (Billboard Japan)	1

=== Monthly charts ===
Monthly chart performance
Chart (2022)	Position
Japanese Albums (Oricon)	1

=== Year-end charts ===
Year-end chart performance
Chart (2022)	Position
Japanese Albums (Oricon)	3
Japanese Combined Albums (Oricon)	5
Japanese Hot Albums (Billboard Japan)	4

Year-end chart performance
Chart (2023)	Position
Japanese Albums (Oricon)	51
Japanese Hot Albums (Billboard Japan)	24

== Certifications ==
Sales and certifications for Dream
Region	Certification	Certified units/sales
Japan (RIAJ)	Million	734,949
