= Face the Sun =

- Digital cover

Studio album by Seventeen
- Released: May 27, 2022
- Recorded: December 2021 – April 2022
- Genre: K-pop
- Length: 29:03
- Language: Korean; English
- Label: Pledis; YG Plus

Seventeen chronology
Attacca (2021)	Face the Sun (2022)	Dream (2022)

Singles from Face the Sun
- 1. "Darl+ing" Released: April 15, 2022; 2. "Hot" Released: May 27, 2022

Sector 17 cover
- Digital cover

Singles from Sector 17
- 1. "Cheers (SVT Leaders)" Released: July 7, 2022; 2. "_World" Released: July 18, 2022

Face the Sun is the fourth studio album by South Korean boy band Seventeen. It was released on May 27, 2022, by Pledis Entertainment through YG Plus. The album contains nine tracks, with "Hot" serving as lead single. The first track, "Darl+ing", was pre-released on April 15, 2022. The repackaged version of the album, titled Sector 17, released on July 18 alongside its lead single "World". The fourth track, "Cheers", was pre-released on July 7, 2022.

== Background ==
In March, seven months after the release of the commercially successful EP Attacca, Pledis Entertainment announced that Seventeen would be releasing a studio album, their first since An Ode (2019), in May. Following the release of the group's first-ever English single "Darling" on April 15, the label confirmed that Seventeen would return on May 27 with a fourth studio album titled Face the Sun. Starting on April 26, the group released "Inner Shadows", a 13-part trailer on YouTube to tease the new album. Described by band member Hoshi as marking the "shedding [of their] former image and becoming more mature", the album greatly contrasts with their earlier, more cheerful concepts.

== Release and promotion ==
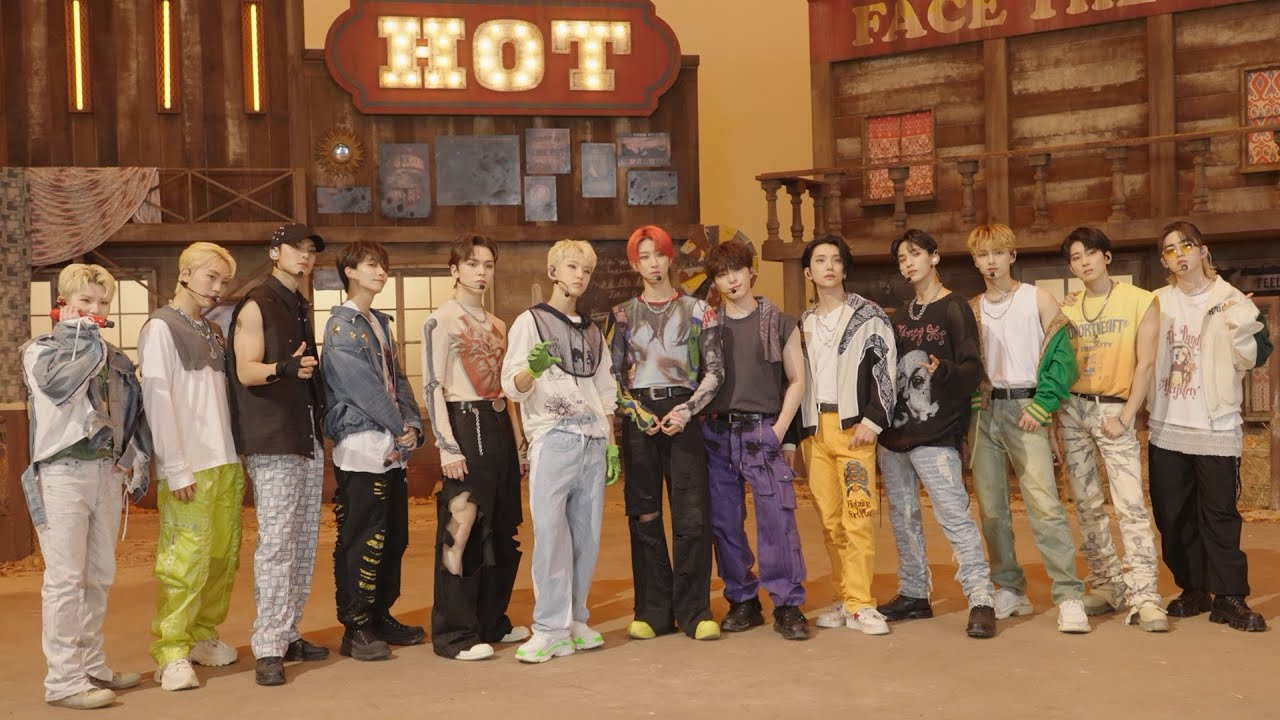
Seventeen on the set for a performance of "Hot", June 2022

Pre-orders for Face the Sun opened on April 22. On May 23, a highlight medley was released, as a preview of the 9 tracks of the album. The album will be supported by the Be The Sun World Tour, their first tour after the Ode to You Tour, which ended prematurely in early 2020 due to the COVID-19 pandemic. The Be the Sun tour began in Seoul, followed by stops in North America and Asia.

Seventeen released a trailer for the reissue of the album, titled Sector 17, at their concert in Seoul. Sector 17 was released on July 18, 2022.

== Commercial performance ==
=== Face the Sun ===
Face the Sun surpassed 1.74 million pre-orders in one week, exceeding Seventeen's previous career high of 1.41 million pre-orders for Attacca. On May 20, it was reported that the album had recorded two million pre-orders. According to the Gaon Music Chart, the album sold 2,239,351 copies in the month of May. Face the Sun debuted at number seven on the US Billboard 200, earning 44,000 album-equivalent units, including 42,000 pure album sales, in its first week. It is Seventeen's highest-charting and first top-ten album on the chart, having previously reached the top 20 twice in 2021 with their EPs Your Choice and Attacca.

=== Sector 17 ===
According to Hanteo, Sector 17 sold 1,126,104 copies in its first week. Later it was reported that the EP sold 2 million copies in its first week, making Seventeen the second K-pop group to sell over 2 million copies in the first week of release.

== Critical reception ==
Professional ratings for Face the Sun
Review scores
Source	Rating
AllMusic	4/5 stars
Clash	7/10
NME	4/5 stars

Both Face the Sun and Sector 17 were met with generally positive reviews. In a positive review for Teen Vogue, Sara Delgado praised Face the Sun for its "sonic versatility." For NME, Abby Webster gave Face the Sun four out of five stars, and wrote that the album's singles paled in comparison to the album's "familiar yet sublimely inventive B-sides." Abbie Aitken for Clash wrote that "Face the Sun is a testament of Seventeen's influence as a key group within K-pop." AllMusic's Neil Z. Yeung gave both Face the Sun and Sector 17 four out of five stars, praising Face the Sun's use of various genres, writing that the album was an "excellent mix of party-starting anthems".

Sarina Bhutani of MTV named Face the Sun one of the albums of the year, saying that "with the release of this album, [Seventeen] created their most sonically settled, emotionally confident record yet". Time Magazine named Sector 17 as one of the best K-pop albums of 2022, describing Face the Sun as an "artistic feat", though writing that the repackaged album, Sector 17 is "superior".

== Accolades ==
Awards and nominations
Year	Organization	Category	Nominated work	Result	Ref.
2022	Genie Music Awards	Album of the Year	Face the Sun	Nominated	
2022	MAMA Awards	Album of the Year	Face the Sun	Nominated	
2022	Circle Chart Music Awards	Album of the Year - 2nd Quarter	Face the Sun	Won	
2022	Circle Chart Music Awards	Album of the Year - 3rd Quarter	Sector 17	Nominated	
2023	Golden Disc Awards	Album Bonsang	Face the Sun	Won	
2023	Japan Gold Disc Award	Best 3 Albums (Asia)	Face the Sun	Won	

== Track listing ==
Face the Sun track listing
No.	Title	Lyrics	Music	Arrangement	Length
1.	"Darl+ing"	Woozi; Bumzu; Shannon	Woozi; Bumzu; Hwang Hyun (MonoTree)	Bumzu; Hwang	2:56
2.	"Hot"	Woozi; Bumzu; Dan August Rigo; Ploypaworawan Praison	Woozi; Bumzu; Tim Tan; Rigo; Praison; Softserveboy (153/Joombas); Alex Keem (153/Joombas)		3:17
3.	"Don Quixote"	Woozi; Bumzu; Wonwoo; Michel "Lindgren" Schulz; Melanie Joy Fontana	Woozi; Bumzu; Tommy Brown; Steven Franks; Fontana; Schulz		2:52
4.	"March"	Woozi; Bumzu; Park Ki-tae (Prismfilter)	Woozi; Bumzu; Park	Bumzu; Park	3:16
5.	"Domino"	Woozi; Bumzu; Mingyu; Sara Davis; Cameron Walker; Jordan Witzigreuter	Woozi; Bumzu; Davis; Walker; Witzigreuter		3:34
6.	"Shadow"	Woozi; Bumzu; Dino; Arcades; Johan Fransson; Ryan Lawrie; Matt Thomson; Max Lynedoch Graham; Gabriel Brandes	Woozi; Bumzu; Dino; Arcades; Fransson; Lawrie; Thomson; Graham; Brandes		3:33
7.	"'Bout You" (노래해)	Woozi; Bumzu; Park	Woozi; Bumzu; Park	Bumzu; Park	2:42
8.	"If You Leave Me"	Woozi; Bumzu; S.Coups; Hoshi; Nmore (Prismfilter)	Woozi; Bumzu; Nmore	Bumzu; Nmore	3:32
9.	"Ash"	Woozi; Bumzu; Vernon; Robb Roy	Woozi; Bumzu; Vernon; Roy; Nick Lee; Kyan Palmer		3:21
Total length:					29:03

Apple Music bonus track
No.	Title	Length
10.	"A Message from Seventeen" (spoken by Vernon)	1:02
Total length:		30:05

Apple Music extended version bonus track
No.	Title	Length
10.	"Darl+ing Music Video Behind the Scenes" (Apple Music Exclusive)	10:57
Total length:		40:00

Sector 17 bonus tracks
No.	Title	Lyrics	Music	Arrangement	Length
1.	"Circles" (돌고 돌아)	Woozi; Bumzu	Woozi; Bumzu; Nmore	Bumzu; Nmore	3:59
2.	"_World"	Woozi; Bumzu; Vernon; S.Coups; Fontana; Schulz	Woozi; Bumzu; Tommy Brown; Steven Franks; Fontana; Schulz		2:58
3.	"Fallin' Flower" (Korean version)	Woozi; Bumzu; Dino; Park	Woozi; Bumzu; Park	Bumzu; Park	3:30
4.	"Cheers" (performed by Seventeen leaders)	Woozi; Bumzu; S.Coups; Hoshi; Vernon	Woozi; Bumzu; Vernon; Ohway!	Bumzu; Ohway!	3:01
Total length:					42:31

Notes

- "'Bout You" is stylized as "'bout you"
- "_World" is stylized as "_WORLD"
- "Cheers" is stylized in all caps

== Charts ==
=== Weekly charts ===
Weekly chart performance for Face the Sun and Sector 17
Chart (2022–2024)	Peak position	
Chart (2022–2024)	FTS	S17
Australian Digital Albums (ARIA)	12	—
Austrian Albums (Ö3 Austria)	22	—
Belgian Albums (Ultratop Flanders)	18	50
Belgian Albums (Ultratop Wallonia)	19	35
Croatian International Albums (HDU)	2	2
Dutch Albums (Album Top 100)	55	—
Finnish Albums (Suomen virallinen lista)	11	—
French Albums (SNEP)	13	—
German Albums (Offizielle Top 100)	7	12
Hungarian Albums (MAHASZ)	11	18
Japanese Albums (Oricon)	1	1
Japanese Hot Albums (Billboard Japan)	1	1
Norwegian Albums (VG-lista)	—	23
Polish Albums (ZPAV)	4	—
South Korean Albums (Gaon)	1	1
Spanish Albums (PROMUSICAE)	20	43
Swedish Physical Albums (Sverigetopplistan)	5	14
Swiss Albums (Schweizer Hitparade)	19	29
UK Album Downloads (OCC)	57	—
US Billboard 200	7	4
US Indie Store Album Sales (Billboard)	13	—
US World Albums (Billboard)	1	1

=== Monthly charts ===
Monthly chart performance for Face the Sun and Sector 17
Chart (2022)	Peak position	
Chart (2022)	FTS	S17
Japanese Albums (Oricon)	2	3
South Korean Albums (Gaon/Circle)	1	3

=== Year-end charts ===
2022 year-end chart performance for Face the Sun and Sector 17
Chart (2022)	Position	
Chart (2022)	FTS	S17
French Albums (SNEP)	179	—
Japanese Albums (Oricon)	7	11
Japanese Hot Albums (Billboard Japan)	8	15
South Korean Albums (Circle)	3	12
South Korean Albums (Circle) Weverse Album	63	61

2023 year-end chart performance for Face the Sun and Sector 17
Chart (2023)	Position	
Chart (2023)	FTS	S17
Japanese Albums (Oricon)	83	—
South Korean Albums (Circle)	35	76

2024 year-end chart performance for Face the Sun
Chart (2024)	Position
South Korean Albums (Circle)	71

== Certifications ==
Sales certifications for Face the Sun
Region	Certification	Certified units/sales
South Korea (KMCA) Physical album	4× Million	4,000,000^{^}
South Korea (KMCA) Weverse album	Platinum	250,000^{^}
^{^} Shipments figures based on certification alone.

Sales certifications for Sector 17
Region	Certification	Certified units/sales
South Korea (KMCA) Physical album	Million	1,000,000^{^}
South Korea (KMCA) Weverse album	Platinum	250,000^{^}
^{^} Shipments figures based on certification alone.
