= Super (Seventeen song) =

2023 single by Seventeen

- "Workout" remix cover

Single by Seventeen

from the EP FML
- Language: Korean
- Released: April 24, 2023
- Genre: K-pop · Jersey club
- Length: 3:20
- Label: Pledis
- Composers: Woozi; Bumzu; August Rigo
- Lyricists: Woozi; Bumzu; S.Coups; Vernon

Seventeen singles chronology
"Dream" (2022)	"Super" (2023)	"F*ck My Life" (2023)

Music video
- "Super" on YouTube

"Super" (Korean: 손오공; RR: Son Ogong; lit. 'Monkey King') is a song by South Korean boy group Seventeen. It was released as one of two lead singles from their extended play, FML, on April 24, 2023.

== Background and release ==
"Super" is also our answer to the question that follows the first track of the album, "F*ck My Life." If you ask "So, how is Seventeen fighting for 'your' life?" "Super" provides our answer by talking about how Seventeen has fought our way through, for whom and with whose support, all of which also continue to propel us forward.

— Woozi on the song's message, Billboard

On March 31, Pledis Entertainment announced the release of the EP, FML. The song title, "Super" was revealed on April 20. Teasers that included snippets from the music video were released on YouTube on April 23 and 24.

The "Workout" remix of the song was released on February 16, 2024, to commemorate the eighth anniversary of the group's fandom, Carats.

== Composition ==
The Korean title for the song "손오공" (Son O-gong) refers to both the Monkey King Sun Wukong, a mythological character from the classic Chinese novel Journey to the West, and Son Goku, the protagonist of the Japanese media franchise Dragon Ball, whose character is also largely based on Sun Wukong. Thematically taking inspiration from the show, a line from the song's chorus, "Feels like I turned into Son Ogong", is performed to the act of drawing two fingers to one's forehead, alluding to Goku's instant transmission teleportation move.

Musically, the track is an alternative jersey club song characterized by its kick rhythms. It was written in the key of G♯ major with a tempo of 137 beats per minute.

== Music video ==
The music video was released on the same day as the album release, April 24, 2023. It was directed by Oui Kim, and features high-energy choreography with 228 back-up dancers. The choreography was contributed to by performance director Yoon Hyelim and choreographer Choi Young-joon. On July 11, the music video for "Super" surpassed 100 million views on YouTube.

== Reception ==
Professional ratings
Review scores
Source	Rating
IZM	2.5/5 stars

Hong Yoo from The Korea Herald praised the song, writing that "Seventeen went wild blasting its fierce energy not only through the music itself but also through choreography". IZM's Jeong Su-min writing that the song "catches the eye with an attractive first impression", although Jeong criticized the song for "reinforc[ing] orientalism". Describing "Super", Neil Z. Yeung from AllMusic wrote that it "pulses to life with a booming beat, euphoric build-up, and a popping drop".

Featured on the list of the 100 best songs of 2023 by Rolling Stone, "Super" ranked number 47 and was dubbed "a victory-lap single". On NME's midyear list of the best K-pop songs of 2023, Rhian Daly wrote that the song "somehow arranges them into a cohesive and infectious whole" and called it "a constantly transforming song that shifts through vows to keep moving forward, gratitude-filled moments of reflection". Grammy included it in their list of the 15 K-pop Songs That Took 2023 By Storm. Palmer Haasch of Business Insider ranked it second best in The best K-pop songs of 2023.

The song was Seventeen's first top 40 entry on the Billboard Global 200. In South Korea, the song has been charting on the Circle Digital Chart for more than 14 weeks, reaching a peak of three on its second week.

== Accolades ==
Awards for "Super"
Year	Organization	Award	Result	Ref.
2023	MTV Video Music Awards	Best K-Pop	Nominated	
2023	MAMA Awards	Best Dance Performance Male Group	Won	
2023	MAMA Awards	Best Music Video	Nominated	
2023	MAMA Awards	Song of the Year	Longlisted	
2024	Golden Disc Awards	Digital Song Bonsang	Won	
2024	Golden Disc Awards	Digital Daesang	Nominated	
2024	Circle Chart Music Awards	Artist of the Year – Digital	Nominated	
2024	Circle Chart Music Awards	Artist of the Year – Global Streaming	Nominated	
2024	Circle Chart Music Awards	Artist of the Year – Streaming Unique Listeners	Nominated	

Music program awards for "Super"
Program	Date	Ref.
Show Champion	May 3, 2023	
M Countdown	May 4, 2023	
Music Bank	May 5, 2023	
Show! Music Core	May 6, 2023	
Inkigayo	May 7, 2023	

== Track listing ==
- Digital download and streaming – Workout Remix
1. "Super" (Workout Remix) – 3:13

== Charts ==
=== Weekly charts ===
Weekly chart performance for "Super"
Chart (2023–2024)	Peak position
Global 200 (Billboard)	37
Hong Kong (Billboard)	21
Indonesia (Billboard)	14
Japan Hot 100 (Billboard)	7
Japan Combined Singles (Oricon)	4
Malaysia (Billboard)	5
Malaysia International (RIM)	4
New Zealand Hot Singles (RMNZ)	15
Philippines (Billboard)	15
Singapore (RIAS)	3
South Korea (Circle)	3
Taiwan (Billboard)	6
UK Indie Breakers (OCC)	19
UK Singles Downloads (Official Charts)	57
UK Singles Sales (OCC)	60
US World Digital Song Sales (Billboard)	8
Vietnam (Vietnam Hot 100)	32

=== Monthly charts ===
Monthly chart performance for "Super"
Chart (2023)	Position
South Korea (Circle)	6

=== Year-end charts ===
2023 year-end chart performance for "Super"
Chart (2023)	Position
South Korea (Circle)	29

2024 year-end chart performance for "Super"
Chart (2024)	Position
South Korea (Circle)	91

== Certifications ==
Certifications for "Super"
Region	Certification	Certified units/sales
Streaming
Japan (RIAJ)	Platinum	100,000,000^{†}
^{†} Streaming-only figures based on certification alone.

== Release history ==
Release history for "Super"
Region	Date	Format	Version	Label	Ref.
Various	April 24, 2023	Digital download; streaming	Original	Pledis; YG Plus	
Various	February 16, 2024	Digital download; streaming	Workout Remix	Pledis; YG Plus	
