= FML (EP) =

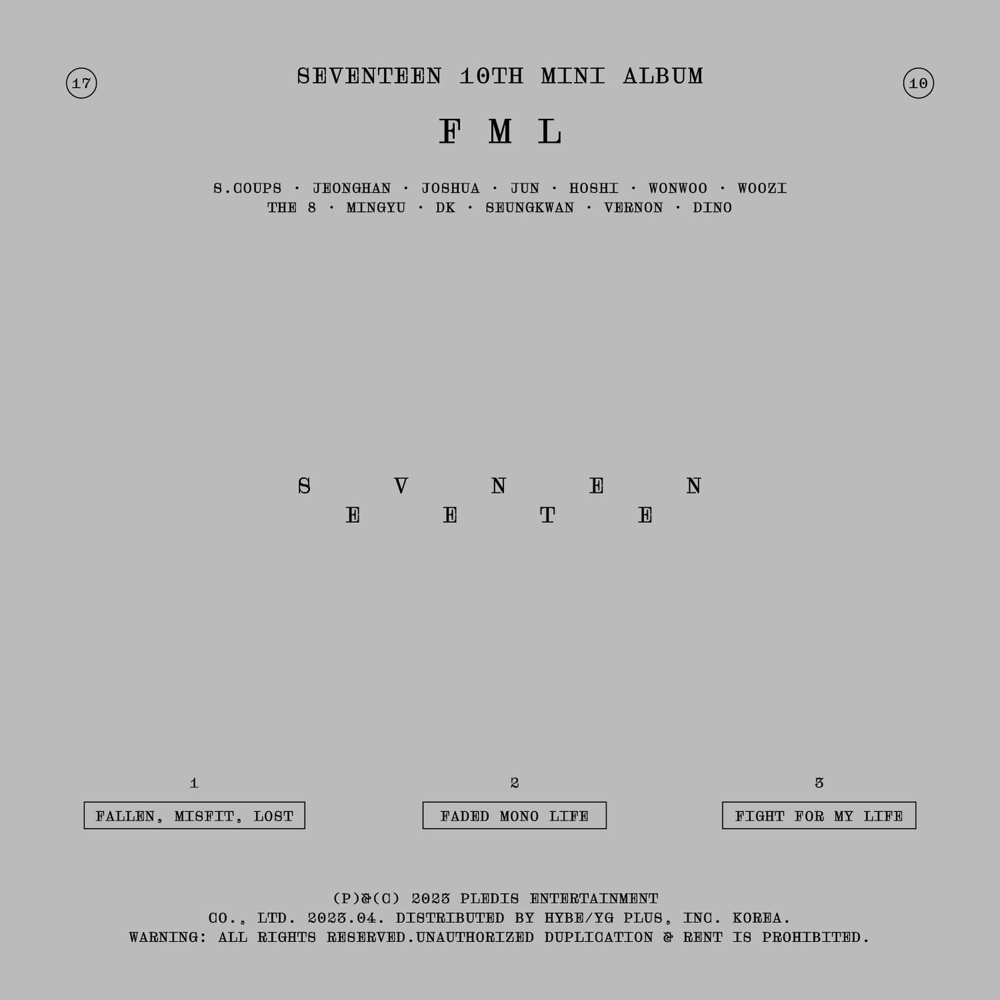
- Digital cover

EP by Seventeen
- Released: April 24, 2023
- Genre: K-pop
- Length: 19:06
- Languages: Korean; English
- Label: Pledis

Seventeen chronology
Dream (2022)	FML (2023)	Always Yours (2023)

Singles from FML
- 1. "F*ck My Life" Released: April 24, 2023; 2. "Super" Released: April 24, 2023

FML is the eleventh Korean extended play (EP) and fourteenth overall by South Korean boy band Seventeen. It was released on April 24, 2023, by Pledis Entertainment through YG Plus, with "F*ck My Life" and "Super" serving as the EP's double lead singles.

Prior to release, FML became the most-preordered album in South Korean history, with 4.64 million preorders. Per Pledis and album distributor YG Plus, combined sales of all versions of FML surpassed 6.2 million copies in July 2023, marking a first for an album by a K-pop artist. It won Album of the Year at the 2023 MAMA Awards.

== Background and release ==
On March 10, 2023, Pledis Entertainment confirmed that Seventeen would be releasing a new album in April, nine months after the release of their reissue Sector 17. On March 31, the label announced the release of the group's EP FML on April 24. On April 3, the track list was revealed, consisting of six songs and two lead singles; FML marked the group's first release to have two lead singles. "F*ck My Life" was the first lead single to be unveiled. On April 4, the EP's promotional schedule was posted. Three sets of concept photos were released the following week, with the official group photo for FML and last set of concept photos released on April 15. The name of the second lead single, "Super", was announced on April 18. The highlight medley was released on April 20.

== Commercial performance ==
FML was pre-ordered 4.64 million times, becoming the most pre-ordered album in South Korean history at the time, breaking the record set by BTS' Map of the Soul: 7 in 2020. In May 2023, this was surpassed by Stray Kids' 5-Star.

On South Korea's Hanteo Chart, FML sold 3.99 million copies in its first day alone, breaking chart records for the most first-day and first-week sales. It sold 4,550,214 physical copies worldwide in its first week and became the first K-pop album to surpass 6 million copies sold.

FML debuted at number two on the US Billboard 200 with 135,000 album-equivalent units, with 132,000 of that figure being pure sales. It is Seventeen's third US top-10 release.

According to the International Federation of the Phonographic Industry (IFPI)'s Global Music Report for 2023, FML was the most-consumed album across all formats, and the best-selling album worldwide, having sold 6.4 million units. (Note: The IFPI Global Albums chart ranks, in order, the albums that generated the most money globally across streaming, download, and physical record sales (combined) in a calendar year. The Global Album Sales Chart measures global unit sales across all physical formats, as well as full album downloads.)

== Accolades ==
The album earned the group its first MAMA Awards daesang (Grand Prize) with Album of the Year during the 2023 ceremony. FML was awarded in the Millions Top 10 category (Note: The top ten songs that surpassed one million streams within their first 24 hours of release on Melon are given this award.) at the Melon Music Awards in December. Paste ranked it number 2 in their list of The 20 Best K-pop Albums of 2023.

Awards and nominations for FML
Award ceremony	Year	Category	Result	Ref.
Asia Artist Awards	2023	Album of the Year	Won	
Asian Pop Music Awards (Note: Hosted by the Hong Kong Asia Pacific International Group and Sunway Records, the Asian Pop Music Awards bases its winners on the "Asian Pop Music Chart" which opened in September 2019.)	2023	Best Album of the Year (Overseas)	Nominated	
Circle Chart Music Awards	2024	Retail Album of the Year	Won	
Golden Disc Awards	2024	Album Bonsang	Won	
Golden Disc Awards	2024	Album Daesang (Album of the Year)	Won	
Hanteo Music Awards	2024	Album of the Year	Won	
MAMA Awards	2023	Album of the Year	Won	
Melon Music Awards	2023	Millions Top 10	Won	
Melon Music Awards	2023	Album of the Year	Longlisted	
Seoul Music Awards	2024	Best Album Award	Won	

== Track listing ==
FML track listing
No.	Title	Lyrics	Music	Arrangement	Length
1.	"F*ck My Life"	Woozi; Bumzu	Woozi; Bumzu	Bumzu; BuildingOwner	3:22
2.	"Super" (손오공)	Woozi; Bumzu; S.Coups; Vernon	Woozi; Bumzu; August Rigo		3:20
3.	"Fire" (Hiphop Team)	Woozi; Bumzu; S.Coups; Wonwoo; Mingyu; Vernon	Bumzu; Wonwoo; Vernon	Bumzu	2:38
4.	"I Don't Understand but I Luv U" (Performance Team)	Woozi; Bumzu; Hoshi; Dino	Woozi; Bumzu; Nmore	Bumzu; Nmore	3:29
5.	"Dust" (먼지; Vocal Team)	Woozi; Bumzu	Woozi; Bumzu; Park Ki-tae	Bumzu; Park	2:45
6.	"April Shower"	Woozi; Bumzu; Softserveboy; Kareem James	Woozi; Bumzu; Softserveboy; James		3:32
Total length:					19:06

== Charts ==
=== Weekly charts ===
Weekly chart performance
Chart (2023)	Peak position
Austrian Albums (Ö3 Austria)	8
Belgian Albums (Ultratop Flanders)	6
Belgian Albums (Ultratop Wallonia)	2
Canadian Albums (Billboard)	44
Dutch Albums (Album Top 100)	76
French Albums (SNEP)	3
German Albums (Offizielle Top 100)	7
Hungarian Albums (MAHASZ)	3
Italian Albums (FIMI)	42
Japanese Albums (Oricon)	1
Japanese Combined Albums (Oricon)	1
Japanese Hot Albums (Billboard Japan)	1
New Zealand Albums (RMNZ)	35
Portuguese Albums (AFP)	2
South Korean Albums (Circle)	1
South Korean Albums (Circle) Weverse Album	2
Spanish Albums (Promusicae)	20
Swedish Physical Albums (Sverigetopplistan)	8
Swiss Albums (Schweizer Hitparade)	4
US Billboard 200	2
US World Albums (Billboard)	1

=== Monthly charts ===
Monthly chart performance
Chart (2023)	Peak position
Japanese Albums (Oricon)	2
South Korean Albums (Circle)	1
South Korean Albums (Circle) Weverse Album	5

=== Year-end charts ===
Year-end chart performance
Chart (2023)	Position
Belgian Albums (Ultratop Flanders)	191
Global Albums (IFPI)	1
Japanese Albums (Oricon)	3
Japanese Combined Albums (Oricon)	3
Japanese Hot Albums (Billboard Japan)	4
South Korean Albums (Circle)	1
South Korean Albums (Circle) Weverse Album	47
US Billboard 200	195
US World Albums (Billboard)	8

== Certifications and sales ==
Certifications and sales
Region	Certification	Certified units/sales
Japan (RIAJ)	Million	766,014
South Korea (KMCA)	5× Million	5,000,000^{^}
South Korea (KMCA) Weverse version	2× Platinum	500,000^{^}
United States	—	288,000
Summaries
Worldwide (IFPI)	—	6,400,000
^{^} Shipments figures based on certification alone.

== See also ==
- List of best-selling albums in South Korea
