= Rock with You (Seventeen song) =

2021 single by Seventeen

Single by Seventeen

from the EP Attacca
- Language: Korean
- Released: October 22, 2021
- Genre: Pop rock; K-pop
- Length: 3:00
- Label: Pledis
- Composers: Woozi; Bumzu; Josh McClelland; Matt Terry; Jordan Wittzigreuter; Cameron Walker; Tim Tan
- Lyricists: Woozi; Bumzu; Vernon; Joshua; Kim In-hyung; Jordan Wittzigreuter; Cameron Walker; Tim Tan

Seventeen singles chronology
"Ready to Love" (2021)	"Rock with You" (2021)	"Power of Love" (2021)

Music video
- "Rock with You" on YouTube

"Rock with You" is a song by South Korean boy band Seventeen. It was released as the lead single of their ninth extended play (EP) Attacca on October 22, 2021.

== Background and release ==
Following the release of Seventeen's previous EP Your Choice, Attacca served as the next installment of their 2021 "Power of Love" project. This marked the band's first album release since the renewal of their contracts with Pledis Entertainment. Conceptualized with the theme of a "loud, passionate, and unapologetic" love, the mini-album spans six tracks and a digital exclusive song, including its lead single "Rock with You", which was released on October 22, 2021. The song's accompanying music video was also released on the same day.

== Composition ==
For me, personally, I talked about this with Bumzu, too, but I was inspired after seeing the motifs in one of our album jacket photos. I saw the flames and motorcycle, and when I saw our members physically embodying this ‘passionate love’ idea, the inspiration hit me way quicker than if I had worked it out on paper or in my head.

— Woozi on the song's inspiration, Rolling Stone

"Rock with You" was described to be a guitar-and-synth-heavy pop rock track, which expressed "the deepening emotions of love against a very energetic melody". Elaborating on the creative process of the song, Seventeen revealed that "Rock with You" had gone through several revisions regarding its melody, key, and recording processes; the group further identified the guitar riff as the song's "key point", interspersing the sound throughout the whole track.

The song was composed by Woozi, Bumzu, Josh McClelland, Matt Terry, Jordan Wittzigreuter, Cameron Walker, and Tim Tan; its lyrics were written by Woozi, Bumzu, Vernon, Joshua, Kim In-Hyung, Jordan Wittzigreuter, Cameron Walker, and Tim Tan.

== Music video ==
Released on October 22, 2021, the music video featured Seventeen individually scattered across various sets — including the interiors of a planetarium, a recording studio, and a beaming stage, among many others — before coming together to perform a "dynamic and spirited" dance performance of the song's choreography. The video was described to thematically provide perspective of one who is ready to break free of the world to meet their lover.

Two special videos of "Rock with You", which include a James Bond-inspired 007 version and a live band version, were later released.

== Commercial performance ==
In South Korea, "Rock with You" peaked at number six on the Gaon Digital Chart, as recorded on the chart dated October 24–30, 2021. The song also debuted at number five on the World Digital Song Sales chart for the issue dated November 6, 2021.

== Critical reception ==
Sara Delgado of NME opined that for a track that was intended to redefine Seventeen's sonic identity, "Rock with You" came off as a "restrained performance" but otherwise recognized it as "an energetic pop rock track that doubles as a passionate love letter" and a "promising reflection" of the group's future. Divyansha Dongre of Rolling Stone India commended Seventeen's vocal prowess and praised the group for "a stellar job at maintaining an energetic tempo with a careful amalgamation of percussion and synth". Reviewing for Teen Vogue, Sara Delgado commented on the song's infectious nature, deeming it "instantly catchy".

== Accolades ==
Music program awards for "Rock with You"
Program	Date	Ref.
M Countdown	October 28, 2021	
Music Bank	October 29, 2021	
Music Bank	November 5, 2021	
Show Champion	November 3, 2021	

== Charts ==
=== Weekly charts ===
Weekly chart performance
Chart (2021)	Peak position
Global 200 (Billboard)	68
Japan Hot 100 (Billboard)	25
Japan Combined Singles (Oricon)	18
South Korea (Gaon)	6
US World Digital Song Sales (Billboard)	5

=== Monthly charts ===
Monthly chart performance
Chart (2021)	Position
South Korea (Gaon)	34

== Certifications ==
Certifications
Region	Certification	Certified units/sales
Streaming
Japan (RIAJ)	Gold	50,000,000^{†}
^{†} Streaming-only figures based on certification alone.
