= 38th Golden Disc Awards =

2024 South Korean music awards ceremony

- Date: January 6, 2024
- Location: Jakarta International Stadium, Jakarta
- Country: Indonesia
- Hosted by: Sung Si-kyung; Cha Eun-woo

Television/radio coverage
- Network: JTBC

The 38th Golden Disc Awards (Korean: 38th 골든 디스크 시상식; RR: 38th Goldeun diseukeu sisangsik) was an award ceremony held on January 6, 2024, at the Jakarta International Stadium in Jakarta, Indonesia. It honored the best in South Korean music released between mid-November 2022 and early-November 2023. The event was hosted by Sung Si-kyung and Cha Eun-woo.

== Criteria ==
Category	Online voting	Panelist (Note: Panelist consisted of professionals such as industry officials, K-pop reporters, music program producers, pop culture critics, major distribution officials, and Golden Disc Awards evaluation committee.)	Sales
Digital Daesang (Song of the Year)	N/A	40%	60%
Disc Daesang (Album of the Year)	N/A	40%	60%
Digital Song Bonsang	N/A	40%	60%
Album Bonsang	N/A	40%	60%
Rookie Artist of the Year (Note: Applies to all digital singles, extended plays/single albums with 6 or less songs, and studio albums.)	N/A	40%	60%
Most Popular Artist Award	100%	N/A	

== Winners and nominees ==
Winners and nominees are listed in alphabetical order. Winners are listed first and emphasized in bold.

=== Main awards ===
Nominations for Digital Song Bonsang, Album Bonsang, and Rookie of the Year were announced on December 4, 2023.

Digital Daesang (Song of the Year)	Album Daesang (Album of the Year)
**NewJeans – "Ditto"**; (G)I-dle – "Queencard"; BSS – "Fighting" (featuring Lee Young-ji); Ive – "I Am"; Jisoo – "Flower"; Jung Kook – "Seven" (featuring Latto); Le Sserafim – "Unforgiven" (featuring Nile Rodgers); Parc Jae-jung – "Let's Say Goodbye"; Seventeen – "Super"; STAYC – "Teddy Bear"	**Seventeen – FML**; Aespa – My World; Enhypen – Dark Blood; Ive – I've Mine; Jung Kook – Golden; Le Sserafim – Unforgiven; NCT Dream – ISTJ; Stray Kids – 5-Star; Tomorrow X Together – The Name Chapter: Freefall; Zerobaseone – Youth in the Shade
Digital Song Bonsang	Album Bonsang
**(G)I-dle – "Queencard"**; **BSS – "Fighting" (featuring Lee Young-ji)**; **Ive – "I Am"**; **Jisoo – "Flower"**; **Jung Kook – "Seven" (featuring Latto)**; **Le Sserafim – "Unforgiven" (featuring Nile Rodgers)**; **NewJeans – "Ditto"**; **Parc Jae-jung – "Let's Say Goodbye"**; **Seventeen – "Super"**; **STAYC – "Teddy Bear"**; Aespa – "Spicy"; AKMU – "Love Lee"; DK – "Heart"; Fifty Fifty – "Cupid"; H1-Key – "Rose Blossom"; Jimin – "Like Crazy"; Lim Young-woong – "London Boy"; NCT Dream – "Candy"; Taeyang – "Vibe" (featuring Jimin); Woody – "Say I Love You"	**Aespa – My World**; **Enhypen – Dark Blood**; **Ive – I've Mine**; **Jung Kook – Golden**; **Le Sserafim – Unforgiven**; **NCT Dream – ISTJ**; **Seventeen – FML**; **Stray Kids – 5-Star**; **Tomorrow X Together – The Name Chapter: Freefall**; **Zerobaseone – Youth in the Shade**; (G)I-dle – I Feel; Agust D – D-Day; Ateez – The World EP.2: Outlaw; Exo – Exist; Itzy – Kill My Doubt; NCT – Golden Age; NCT 127 – Fact Check; Nmixx – Expérgo; Treasure – Reboot; Twice – Ready to Be
Rookie Artist of the Year
**Fifty Fifty**; **Zerobaseone**; BoyNextDoor; Evnne; Hwang Yeong-woong; Lun8; N.SSign; Plave; Riize; Xikers

=== Other awards ===
Best Producer	Next Generation
**Min Hee-jin**	**BoyNextDoor**
Indonesia Fans Choice Award	Popular Artist
**Tomorrow X Together**	**Jisoo**; **Lim Young-woong**
Global K-pop Artist
**Stray Kids**

=== Multiple awards ===
The following artist(s) received three awards:

Awards	Artist(s)
3	Seventeen
