= Your Choice =

- Digital cover

EP by Seventeen
- Released: June 18, 2021
- Genres: K-pop; R&B
- Length: 20:18
- Languages: Korean; English
- Labels: Pledis; YG Plus

Seventeen chronology
Semicolon (2020)	Your Choice (2021)	Attacca (2021)

Singles from Your Choice
- 1. "Ready to Love" Released: June 18, 2021

Your Choice is the ninth Korean extended play (EP) and eleventh overall by South Korean boy band Seventeen. Released through Pledis Entertainment on June 18, 2021, the album comes eight months after its predecessor, Semicolon. Characterized by hip hop and R&B elements, the album consists of six tracks, including the lead single, "Ready to Love". As part of the group's "Power of 'Love'" project, the album depicts the nature of love, and experiments with various genres, including disco funk, rock, and retro R&B.

Seventeen promoted the album through performances on several South Korean and American music shows. Although the album received mixed reviews from critics, it achieved commercial success, selling over a million copies within its first four days of release. Your Choice topped the Gaon Album Chart and Billboard's World Albums Chart and debuted at number 15 on the Billboard 200. It charted nationally in 11 countries, reaching the top ten in Japan and Croatia.

== Background ==
We thought the message of love is what could really console people and resonate with them, especially in these tough times that we're having. [...] This time, we wanted to use this word, "love," and the concept of love: we thought it would really express our growth. We thought that would be a good keyword to show where we are and express how we have grown.

— Seungkwan on the album's message, Grammy

The album is part of Seventeen's "Power of 'Love'" project, which aims to depict different aspects of love. Your Choice is the first album included in the project, following the song "Bittersweet" by members Wonwoo and Mingyu, released in May 2021. While "Bittersweet" explores the intersection of friendship and love, member S.Coups noted that the album's lead single, "Ready to Love", explores falling in love and confessing feelings. Your Choice also reveals a more mature side to Seventeen, compared to their prior releases.

The album was highly anticipated due to the success of Seventeen's three previous albums, each having sold over one million copies. As their first album since Hybe's acquisition of their label, Pledis, in 2020, Your Choice involved Hybe producers Wonderkid and Bang Si-hyuk for the first time, further increasing the anticipation of the album's release.

== Release and promotion ==
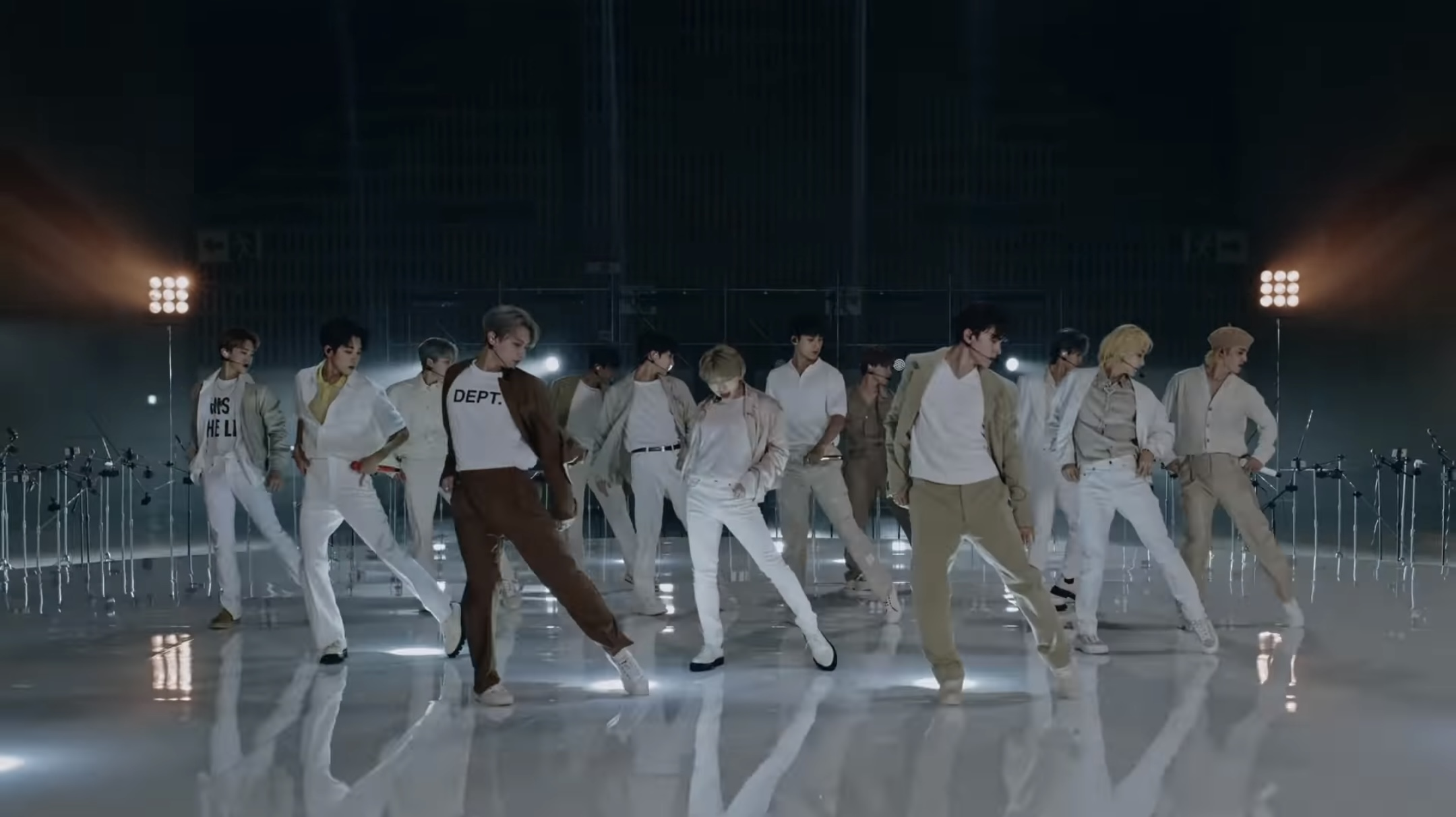
Seventeen performing "Ready to Love" on Jimmy Kimmel Live! in 2021

On May 18, an animated 90-second concept trailer for the "Power of 'Love'" project was released on Seventeen's YouTube channel, which confirmed the group's comeback and announced that Your Choice would be released on June 18. On June 7, a concept trailer for the album was released, followed by the album's track list on June 14. A highlight medley featuring short audio snippets of each song of the album was unveiled on June 15. Teasers for "Ready to Love" were released on June 16 and 17, showing short parts of the music video and choreography.

Two hours prior to its release on June 18, Seventeen held a media conference in Seoul for the album. The album release was accompanied by a music video for "Ready to Love" on the same day, which included pastel sets and a dreamy atmosphere. The physical album was available in four versions, including one exclusive to Target. The group performed "Ready to Love" on South Korean music shows, including Music Bank and Inkigayo, and also appeared on American music shows, including ABC's Jimmy Kimmel Live! on June 23 and MTV's Fresh Out Live on June 25. On June 27, a special "confession day" video for "Ready to Love" was released. A performance video for "Anyone", featuring an auto racing theme, was released on July 24.

== Composition ==
"Ready to Love"
An 18-second sample of the chorus of "Ready to Love", a R&B pop song, with lyrics expressing a love confession.

The album consists of six tracks with a predominantly comforting sound and depicts the nature of love. Musically, the album experiments with a variety of genres, including disco funk, rock, and retro R&B. The first song of the album, "Heaven's Cloud" is a "graceful" pop song, characterized by its "airy, almost carefree instrumentation". The second song and lead single, "Ready to Love" is an R&B pop song, featuring synth bass and expressing a love confession. "Anyone" is a darker song, featuring an electric guitar riff.

The final three tracks of the album – "Gam3 Bo1", "Wave", and "Same Dream, Same Mind, Same Night" – are songs performed by sub-units of the group, each focusing on a specific style. "Gam3 Bo1", the Hiphop Unit's song, is described as an "unconventional hyper-pop" song and characterized by its "glitchy videogame-inspired" trap beats. The song also includes references to the Internet, including NFTs and Zoom. "Wave", the Performance Unit's song, is characterized by house beats and was dubbed as "the group's magnum opus" by NME. The last song on the album "Same Dream, Same Mind, Same Night", the Vocal Unit's song, is a R&B ballad, featuring rich vocals.

== Critical reception ==
Professional ratings
Review scores
Source	Rating
AllMusic	3.5/5 stars
IZM	2.5/5 stars
NME	4/5 stars

The album received mixed reviews from critics. Puah Ziwei from NME rated the album four out of five stars, writing "the group continue to showcase their flourishing creativity and musical experimentation, with the exception of a couple minor missteps". Rating the album with 3.5 out of five stars, David Crone from AllMusic commented that the album "continues to develop the group's wide array of genre explorations". IZM's Jeong Su-min compared the album to Seventeen's past releases before Hybe's acquisition of Pledis, writing that "Hybe's desire to create a presence in the US in a short period of time reduced Seventeen's liveliness". "Ready to Love" ranked number 15 on Billboard's "25 Best K-Pop Songs of 2021", where the song was described as a "buzzing, electro-pop production that surges and grows throughout the track".

Your Choice on year-end lists
Critic/Publication	List	Work	Rank	Ref.
Billboard	The 25 Best K-Pop Songs of 2021	"Ready to Love"	15	
MTV	The Best K-pop B-sides of 2021	"Anyone"	—N/a	
Teen Vogue	The Best K-Pop Songs of 2021	"Gam3 Bo1"	—N/a	

== Commercial performance ==
Your Choice sold 880,000 copies on its first day of release and surpassed one million sales within four days. According to the Hanteo Chart, the album sold 1.36 million copies in the first week, marking the highest first-week sales in South Korea in 2021; this also set a record for the band previously set by Heng:garæ. Your Choice became Seventeen's fourth album to sell over a million copies. The album also attracted international attention, selling 20,500 copies in the United States within its first six days, according to MRC Data.

The day following its release, the album became the number-one album on the iTunes Top Albums Chart in 18 regions. It also became the number-one album on the daily album category on the Oricon Chart. Your Choice marks Seventeen's first entry on the US Billboard 200 at number 15 and their first number one on Billboard's Top Album Sales chart. In South Korea, the album charted for six consecutive weeks on the Gaon Chart's album chart upon release, remaining at the number one spot for its first two weeks after release. The album also charted on the monthly Gaon Album Chart for two months, topping the chart in June.

== Track listing ==
Your Choice track listing
No.	Title	Lyrics	Music	Arrangement	Length
1.	"Heaven's Cloud"	Woozi; Bumzu; S.Coups; Mingyu	Woozi; Bumzu; Nmore (Prismfilter)	Bumzu; Nmore	3:52
2.	"Ready to Love"	Woozi; Bumzu; S.Coups; Mingyu; Danke; "Hitman" Bang; Kyler Niko	Woozi; Bumzu; "Hitman" Bang; Wonderkid; Niko; Christoffer Semelius; H.Kenneth	Bumzu; "Hitman" Bang; Wonderkid	3:06
3.	"Anyone"	Woozi; Bumzu; S.Coups	Woozi; Bumzu	Bumzu; Ohway! (Prismfilter)	2:56
4.	"Gam3 Bo1" (Hiphop Unit)	Bumzu; S.Coups; Wonwoo; Mingyu; Vernon; Woozi	Bumzu; Niera (Prismfilter); Vernon	Bumzu; Niera	3:09
5.	"Wave" (Performance Unit)	Woozi; Bumzu; Hoshi; Jun; The8; Dino	Woozi; Bumzu; Anchor (Prismfilter)	Bumzu; Anchor	3:04
6.	"Same Dream, Same Mind, Same Night" (같은 꿈, 같은 맘, 같은 밤, Vocal Unit)	Woozi; Bumzu	Woozi; Bumzu; Park Ki-tae (Prismfilter)	Park; Bumzu	4:07
Total length:					20:18

== Accolades ==
Music program awards for Your Choice
Song	Program	Date	Ref.
"Ready to Love"	Music Bank	June 25, 2021	
"Ready to Love"	Music Bank	July 2, 2021	
"Ready to Love"	Show Champion	June 30, 2021	
"Ready to Love"	M Countdown	July 1, 2021	

Awards for Your Choice
Year	Organization	Award	Nominated Work	Result	Ref.
2021	Mnet Asian Music Awards	Best Dance Performance – Male Group	"Ready to Love"	Nominated	
2021	MTV Video Music Awards	Best K-Pop Video	"Ready to Love"	Nominated	
2022	Gaon Chart Music Awards	Album of the Year – 3rd Quarter	Your Choice	Nominated	

== Charts ==
=== Weekly charts ===
Weekly chart performance
Chart (2021–2026)	Peak position
Austrian Albums (Ö3 Austria)	50
Belgian Albums (Ultratop Flanders)	21
Belgian Albums (Ultratop Wallonia)	14
Croatian International Albums (HDU)	3
German Albums (Offizielle Top 100)	36
Hungarian Physical Albums (MAHASZ)	36
Japanese Albums (Oricon)	2
Polish Albums (ZPAV)	46
South Korean Albums (Gaon)	1
Spanish Albums (PROMUSICAE)	25
Swiss Albums (Schweizer Hitparade)	88
UK Album Downloads (Official Charts)	69
US Billboard 200	15
US World Albums (Billboard)	1

=== Monthly chart ===
Monthly chart performance
Chart (2021)	Position
Japanese Albums (Oricon)	2
South Korean Albums (Gaon)	1

=== Year-end chart ===
Year-end chart performance
Chart (2021)	Position
South Korean Albums (Gaon)	6

== Sales and certifications ==
Sales and certifications for Your Choice
Region	Certification	Certified units/sales
Japan (RIAJ)	Platinum	251,489
South Korea (KMCA)	Million	1,648,770
United States	—	20,500

== Release history ==
Release formats for Your Choice
Region	Date	Format	Label	Ref.
South Korea	June 18, 2021	Digital download; streaming	Pledis Entertainment; YG Plus	
South Korea	June 18, 2021	CD (3 versions: One Side, Other Side, Beside)	Pledis Entertainment; YG Plus	
Various	June 18, 2021	Digital download; streaming	Pledis Entertainment	
Various	June 18, 2021	CD (Other Side - Target exclusive)	Pledis Entertainment	
