= Attacca (EP) =

- Digital cover

EP by Seventeen
- Released: October 22, 2021
- Recorded: 2021
- Genre: K-pop
- Length: 22:42
- Language: Korean; English
- Label: Pledis; YG Plus

Seventeen chronology
| Your Choice (2021) | Attacca (2021) | Face the Sun (2022) |

Singles from Attacca
- 1. "Rock with You" Released: October 22, 2021

Attacca is the tenth Korean extended play (EP) and twelfth overall by the South Korean boy band Seventeen released on October 22, 2021 by Pledis Entertainment. The EP contains seven tracks, which include the lead single "Rock with You".

== Background and release ==
On August 23, Pledis Entertainment reported that the group was preparing a new album that would be released in October. The comeback took place four months after their previous mini album Your Choice in June and would be their first album since the members renewed their contracts with Pledis Entertainment.

On September 23, Pledis Entertainment released the concept trailer for Attacca. The trailer flashes the word “boyhood” on the screen as a blue teddy bear engulfed in flames is thrown down to the pavement. After several scenes flash in succession–including snippets of the group's members dancing in the street, playing with paintbrushes, riding on motorcycles, and playing an electric guitar—all thirteen members come together in the end to admire a sunset on the rooftop of a building, with the album's name and October 22 release date hanging above their heads in animated text.

Later on October 18, the group released a highlight medley of songs from Attacca in a highly stylized video uploaded to their YouTube page. The video teaser sees the group taking to various sound stages to perform clips of seven songs — “To You,” “Rock with You,” “Crush,” “Pang!” “Imperfect Love,” “I Can't Run Away” and “2 Minus 1” — that depict the group members hanging out in a chemistry lab, plant and flower-filled gardens, and warehouses with neon lights. “2 Minus 1” is the one track from Attacca that was released as a digital single only.

The band shared two music video teasers for their new song "Rock with You" through their official YouTube channel at midnight on October 21.

Attacca was released on October 22. To promote the album, the group held a press conference ahead of its release.

== Critical reception ==
Professional ratings for Attacca
Review scores
| Source | Rating |
|---|---|
| IZM | 3/5 stars |
| NME | 4/5 stars |

In a review for NME, Angela Suacillo scored Attacca four out of five stars, commenting that although the mini-album is "largely defined by the group's venture into a pop-punk sound as a representation of their growth as artists", it "feels less like a release designed to redefine Seventeen's sound and more like a promise of what the group could be in the future". Sara Delgado of Teen Vogue commended the record for being "loud, passionate, and unapologetic", summarizing it as a "more than enjoyable 23-minute ride from the very first listen". Jung Soo-min, in the three-star review for IZM, praised the clear artistic direction and the cohesive sonic identity of the EP, but noted some loss of individuality among the sub-units.

== Commercial performance ==
On the first day of pre-order, Pledis announced that the album sold 1.41 million pre-order sales, surpassing their previous EP Your Choice, which sold 1.36 million copies. The album later sold 1.9 million copies in October, making Seventeen's 5th consecutive million sellers in a row. In November, it became the group's first album to be certified as a double million seller, and was Seventeen's best-selling album at the time.

== Track listing ==
Attacca track listing
| No. | Title | Lyrics | Music | Arrangement | Length |
|---|---|---|---|---|---|
| 1. | "To You" (소용돌이) | Woozi; Bumzu | Woozi; Bumzu; Nmore (Prismfilter) | Park Gi Tae (Prismfilter) | 3:45 |
| 2. | "Rock with You" | Woozi; Bumzu; Vernon; Joshua; Kim In-hyun; Jordan Witzigreuter; Cameron Walker; Tim Tan | Woozi; Bumzu; Josh McClelland; Matt Terry; Witzigreuter; Walker; Tan | | 3:00 |
| 3. | "Crush" | Woozi; Bumzu; Vernon; Higher Baby; Analise Hoveyda | Woozi; Bumzu; Park Seul Gi (20Hz); Higher Baby; Hoveyda; Tiyon "TC" Mack; Tesung Kim | | 2:49 |
| 4. | "Pang!" (Performance Unit) | Woozi; Bumzu; Hoshi; Dino | Woozi; Bumzu; Poptime; Bir$day (Prismfilter); HeyFarmer (Prismfilter); Dino | Bumzu; Poptime; Bir$day (Prismfilter); HeyFarmer (Prismfilter) | 2:58 |
| 5. | "Imperfect Love" (매일 그대라서 행복하다; Vocal Unit) | Woozi; Bumzu | Woozi; Bumzu; Park Gi Tae (Prismfilter) | Woozi; Bumzu; Park Gi Tae (Prismfilter); Lee Beom Hun (Prismfilter) | 3:24 |
| 6. | "I Can't Run Away" (그리워하는 것까지; Hiphop Unit) | S.Coups; Wonwoo; Mingyu; Vernon; Woozi; Bumzu | Wonwoo; Mingyu; Woozi; Bumzu; Ohway! (Prismfilter); Vernon | Bumzu; Ohway! (Prismfilter) | 3:30 |
| Total length: | | | | | 19:29 |

Digital Only
| No. | Title | Lyrics | Music | Arrangement | Length |
|---|---|---|---|---|---|
| 7. | "2 Minus 1" (Joshua, Vernon) | Joshua; Vernon | Joshua; Vernon; Woozi; Bumzu; HeyFarmer (Prismfilter) | Bumzu; HeyFarmer (Prismfilter) | 3:13 |
| Total length: | | | | | 22:42 |

Notes

- "To You" is stylized as "To you"
- "Rock with You" is stylized as "Rock with you"
- "Pang!" is stylized as "PANG!"
- "2 Minus 1" is stylized as "2 MINUS 1"

== Charts ==
=== Weekly charts ===
Weekly chart performance
| Chart (2021–2023) | Peak position |
|---|---|
| Austrian Albums (Ö3 Austria) | 37 |
| Belgian Albums (Ultratop Flanders) | 55 |
| Belgian Albums (Ultratop Wallonia) | 83 |
| Canadian Albums (Billboard) | 48 |
| Croatian International Albums (HDU) | 26 |
| Dutch Albums (Album Top 100) | 62 |
| Finnish Albums (Suomen virallinen lista) | 37 |
| French Albums (SNEP) | 15 |
| German Albums (Offizielle Top 100) | 26 |
| Japanese Albums (Oricon) | 1 |
| Japan Hot Albums (Billboard Japan) | 1 |
| South Korean Albums (Gaon) | 1 |
| Swiss Albums (Schweizer Hitparade) | 69 |
| US Billboard 200 | 13 |
| US World Albums (Billboard) | 1 |

=== Year-end charts ===
Year-end chart performance
| Chart (2021) | Position |
|---|---|
| Japanese Albums (Oricon) | 5 |
| Japanese Hot Albums (Billboard Japan) | 8 |
| South Korean Albums (Gaon) | 4 |
| Chart (2022) | Position |
| Japanese Albums (Oricon) | 59 |
| Japanese Hot Albums (Billboard Japan) | 81 |
| South Korean Albums (Circle) | 69 |
| Chart (2023) | Position |
| South Korean Albums (Circle) | 53 |
| Chart (2024) | Position |
| South Korean Albums (Circle) | 100 |

== Certifications and sales ==
Certifications and sales
| Region | Certification | Certified units/sales |
|---|---|---|
| Japan (RIAJ) | 2× Platinum | 500,000^{^} |
| South Korea (KMCA) | 3× Million | 3,000,000^{^} |
^{^} Shipments figures based on certification alone.
