= Seventeen discography =

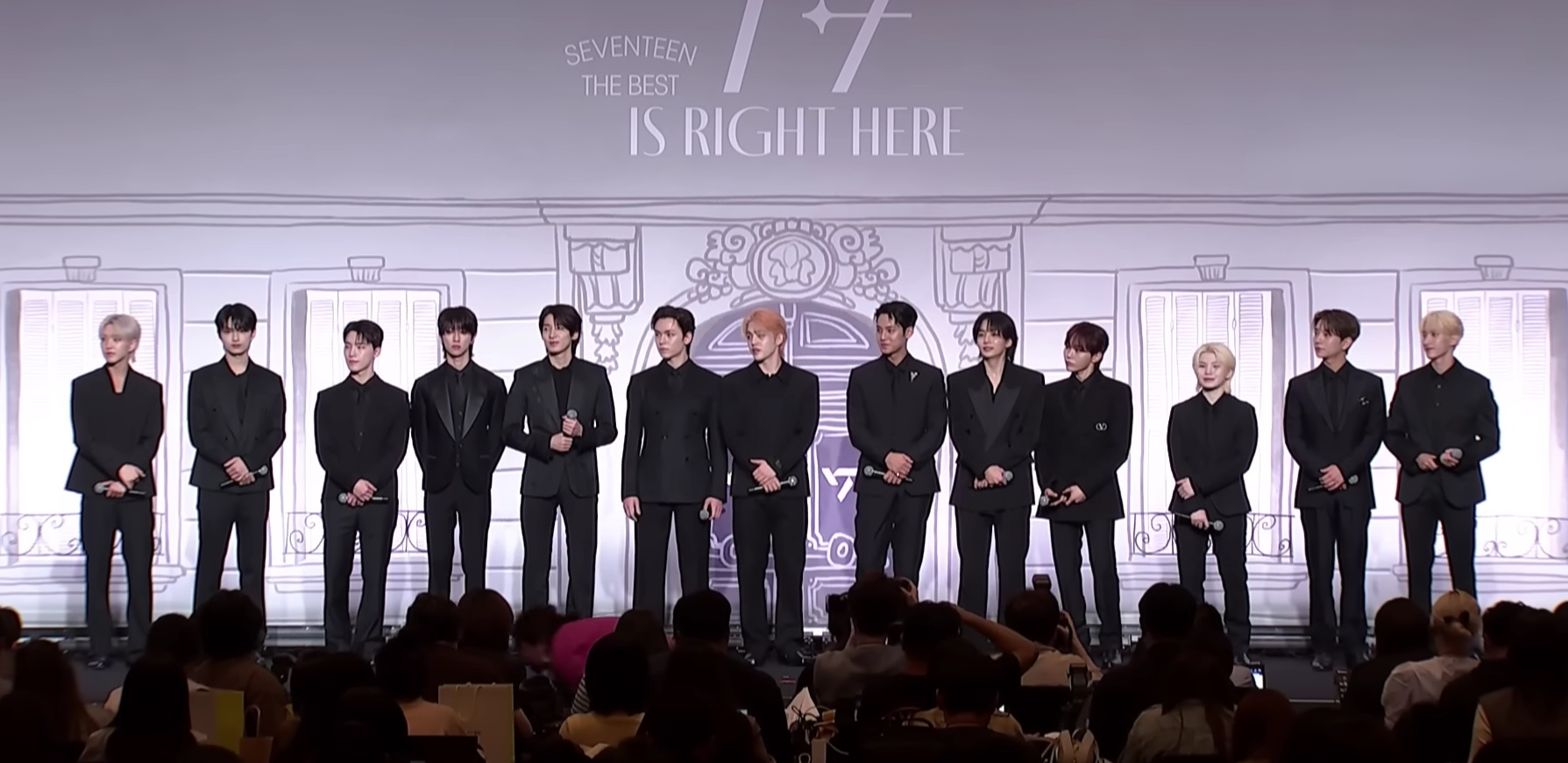
- Seventeen at the press conference for 17 Is Right Here in April 2024
- Studio albums: 5
- EPs: 16
- Compilation albums: 2
- Singles: 35
- Reissues: 3

South Korean boy group Seventeen has released five studio albums, three reissues, two compilation albums, 13 extended plays, and 35 singles.

Seventeen debuted in 2015 with the EP 17 Carat which peaked at number four on South Korea's Gaon Album Chart. While the EP's lead single, "Adore U", did not enter the singles chart, the group found success with subsequent releases and it became the group's only Korean language single to fail to chart. The group's first studio album, Love & Letter, released in April 2016, became their first record to top South Korea's album chart, and all Korean-language releases since have peaked in the top position.

After multiple singles peaking in the low teens, the group first reached the top ten of South Korea's single chart with "Left & Right" in 2020. Their first song to top the chart was "God of Music" from Seventeenth Heaven (2023), which was followed by further number ones with "Maestro", "Love, Money, Fame", and "Thunder".

The group made their Japanese-language debut in May 2018 with the EP We Make You, which reached the second spot on Japan's Oricon albums chart and was certified gold by RIAJ in November that year. Seventeen have since released two more Japanese language EPs, 24H (2020) and Dream (2022), which both topped the Oricon charts and earned platinum and million certifications respectively. Four of the group's Japanese singles have reached the top spot of the Oricon singles chart, "Fallin' Flower", "Not Alone", "Power of Love" and "Shohikigen". The four singles are among the group's songs that have received certifications for sales volumes, with "Fallin' Flower" additionally receiving a gold certification by RIAJ in 2024 for its streaming figures.

In 2023, Seventeen were recognized by the International Federation of the Phonographic Industry for having the best-selling album of the year with FML, with Seventeenth Heaven also charting in the top ten. FML and Seventeenth Heaven also both garnered MAMA Album of the Year awards during the 2023 and 2024 ceremonies respectively.

== Albums ==
=== Studio albums ===
List of studio albums, with selected details, chart positions, sales, and certifications
Title	Details	Peak chart positions									Sales	Certifications (Note: In April 2018, Gaon Music Chart introduced music recording certifications for albums, downloads, and streamings that were released and licensed in Korea starting from January 2018 onward.)
Title	Details	KOR	AUT	BEL (FL)	FRA	JPN	JPN Hot	UK Dig.	US	US World	Sales	Certifications
Love & Letter	Released: April 25, 2016; Label: Pledis Entertainment; Formats: CD, digital download	1	—	—	—	6	—	—	— (Note: Love & Letter did not enter the Billboard 200, but it peaked at number 5 on the Billboard Heatseekers chart.)	3	KOR: 337,568; JPN: 80,742 (Note: The sales of Love & Letter and Love & Letter Repackage are combined in Oricon.); US: 1,000	—N/a
Teen, Age	Released: November 6, 2017; Label: Pledis; Formats: CD, digital download	1	—	—	—	5	25	—	— (Note: Teen, Age did not enter the Billboard 200, but it peaked at number 8 on the Billboard Top Heatseekers chart.)	1	KOR: 744,935; JPN: 70,996	—N/a
An Ode	Released: September 16, 2019; Label: Pledis; Formats: CD, digital download, QR code	1	—	—	—	1	7	—	— (Note: An Ode did not enter the Billboard 200, but it peaked at number 25 on the Billboard Top Heatseekers chart.)	7	KOR: 1,688,230; JPN: 261,150	KMCA: Million
Face the Sun	Released: May 27, 2022; Label: Pledis; Formats: CD, digital download, QR code	1	22	18	13	1	1	57	7	1	KOR: 4,758,777; JPN: 513,980; US: 74,000	KMCA: 4× Million; KMCA: Platinum (Wev.); RIAJ: 2× Platinum
Happy Burstday	Released: May 26, 2025; Label: Pledis; Formats: CD, digital download, QR code	1	12	25	14	1	1	38	2	1	WW: 2,630,000; KOR: 2,987,300; JPN: 456,910; US: 46,000	KMCA: 2× Million; RIAJ: 2× Platinum
"—" denotes releases that did not chart or were not released in that region.

=== Compilation albums ===
List of compilation albums, with selected details, chart positions, sales, and certifications
Title	Details	Peak chart positions										Sales	Certifications
Title	Details	KOR	BEL (FL)	BEL (WA)	FRA	GER	JPN	JPN Hot	SWI	US	US World	Sales	Certifications
Always Yours	Released: August 23, 2023; Label: Pledis; Formats: CD, digital download	—	—	—	—	—	1	1	—	—	4	JPN: 750,000	RIAJ: Million
17 Is Right Here	Released: April 29, 2024; Label: Pledis; Formats: CD, digital download	1	13	7	6	13	1	1	16	5	1	WW: 3,100,000; KOR: 3,660,246; JPN: 333,267	KMCA: 3× Million; KMCA: Platinum (Wev.); RIAJ: Platinum
"—" denotes releases that did not chart or were not released in that region.

=== Reissues ===
List of reissues, with selected details, chart positions, sales, and certifications
Title	Album details	Peak chart positions							Sales	Certifications
Title	Album details	KOR	JPN	JPN Hot	US	US Heat.	US Ind.	US World	Sales	Certifications
Love & Letter Repackage Album	Released: July 4, 2016; Label: Pledis; Formats: CD, digital download	1	6	—	—	—	—	—	KOR: 267,069; JPN: 80,742	—N/a
Director's Cut	Released: February 5, 2018; Label: Pledis; Formats: CD, digital download, SMC	1	2	19	—	2	19	2	KOR: 381,948; JPN: 58,976	KMCA: Platinum
Sector 17	Released: July 18, 2022; Label: Pledis; Formats: CD, digital download, SMC	1	1	1	4	—	—	1	KOR: 2,212,816; JPN: 290,052 (phy.); US: 31,000	KMCA: Million; KMCA: Platinum (Wev.); RIAJ: Platinum
"—" denotes releases that did not chart or were not released in that region.

== Extended plays ==
=== Korean extended plays ===
List of Korean extended plays, with selected details, chart positions, sales, and certifications
Title	Details	Peak chart positions								Sales	Certifications
Title	Details	KOR	FRA	JPN	JPN Hot	US	US Heat.	US Ind.	US World	Sales	Certifications
17 Carat	Released: May 29, 2015; Label: Pledis; Formats: CD, digital download	4	—	46	—	—	—	—	8	KOR: 205,389; JPN: 2,086	—N/a
Boys Be	Released: September 10, 2015; Label: Pledis; Formats: CD, digital download	2	—	35	—	—	—	—	1	KOR: 340,494; JPN: 13,776	—N/a
Going Seventeen	Released: December 5, 2016; Label: Pledis; Formats: CD, digital download	1	—	4	—	—	9	—	3	KOR: 461,665; JPN: 62,283	—N/a
Al1	Released: May 22, 2017; Label: Pledis; Formats: CD, digital download	1	—	3	—	—	10	26	2	KOR: 586,484; JPN: 73,377; US: 2,000	—N/a
You Make My Day	Released: July 16, 2018; Label: Pledis; Formats: CD, digital download, SMC	1	—	2	16	—	7	27	3	KOR: 595,892; JPN: 135,604	KMCA: 2× Platinum
You Made My Dawn	Released: January 21, 2019; Label: Pledis; Formats: CD, digital download, SMC	1	—	1	8	—	13	30	4	KOR: 679,126; JPN: 178,671; US: 2,000	KMCA: 2× Platinum
Heng:garæ	Released: June 22, 2020; Label: Pledis; Formats: CD, digital download, SMC	1	—	1	3	—	—	—	14	KOR: 1,846,130; JPN: 251,357	KMCA: Million
Semicolon	Released: October 19, 2020; Label: Pledis; Formats: CD, digital download, SMC	1	—	2	12	—	—	—	—	KOR: 1,234,675; JPN: 216,007	KMCA: Million
Your Choice	Released: June 18, 2021; Label: Pledis; Formats: CD, digital download, SMC	1	—	2	2	15	—	—	1	KOR: 1,747,341; JPN: 251,489 (phy.); US: 20,500	KMCA: Million; RIAJ: Platinum
Attacca	Released: October 22, 2021; Label: Pledis; Formats: CD, digital download, SMC	1	15	1	1	13	—	—	1	KOR: 3,077,450; JPN: 340,410 (phy.); US: 25,000	KMCA: 3× Million; RIAJ: 2× Platinum
FML	Released: April 24, 2023; Label: Pledis; Formats: CD, digital download, SMC	1	3	1	1	2	—	—	1	WW: 6,400,000; KOR: 6,402,699; JPN: 766,014 (phy.); US: 288,000	KMCA: 5× Million; KMCA: 2× Platinum (Wev.); RIAJ: Million
Seventeenth Heaven	Released: October 23, 2023; Label: Pledis; Formats: CD, digital download	1	5	1	1	2	—	—	1	WW: 4,500,000; KOR: 5,954,356; JPN: 522,515; US: 98,000	KMCA: 5× Million; KMCA: Platinum (KiT.); KMCA: 2× Platinum (Wev.); RIAJ: Million
Spill the Feels	Released: October 14, 2024; Label: Pledis; Formats: CD, digital download	1	18	1	1	5	—	—	1	WW: 3,400,000; KOR: 3,868,114; JPN: 409,582; US: 64,000	KMCA: 3× Million; KMCA: Platinum (KiT.); KMCA: Platinum (Wev.); RIAJ: 2× Platinum
"—" denotes releases that did not chart or were not released in that region.

=== Japanese extended plays ===
List of Japanese extended plays, with selected details, chart positions, sales, and certifications
Title	Details	Peak chart positions		Sales	Certifications
Title	Details	JPN	JPN Hot	Sales	Certifications
We Make You	Released: May 30, 2018; Label: Pledis; Formats: CD, digital download	2	2	JPN: 164,639	RIAJ: Gold
24H	Released: September 9, 2020; Label: Pledis; Formats: CD, digital download, SMC	1	1	JPN: 322,382	RIAJ: Platinum
Dream	Released: November 9, 2022; Label: Pledis; Formats: CD, digital download	1	1	JPN: 734,949 (phy.)	RIAJ: Million

== Singles ==
=== As lead artist ===
==== Korean singles ====
List of Korean singles, with selected chart positions, sales, and certifications, showing year released and album name
Title	Year	Peak chart positions						Sales (Note: Sales figures for tracks are based on digital downloads, except noted.)	Certifications	Album
Title	Year	KOR	KOR Billb. (Note: Includes the Billboard K-pop Hot 100 Chart (2011–2022) and the Billboard South Korea Songs Chart (2022–2024).)	JPN Hot	NZ Hot	US World	WW	Sales	Certifications	Album
"Adore U" (아낀다)	2015	—	—	—	—	13	—	KOR: 34,389	—N/a	17 Carat
"Mansae" (만세)	2015	94	—	—	—	5	—	KOR: 82,771	RIAJ: Gold (Note: Certification for streaming)	Boys Be
"Pretty U" (예쁘다)	2016	11	—	—	—	4	—	KOR: 388,811	RIAJ: Gold (Note: Certification for streaming)	Love & Letter
"Very Nice" (아주 Nice)	2016	22	57	—	—	2	—	KOR: 300,805	RIAJ: Platinum (Note: Certification for streaming)	Love & Letter
"Boom Boom" (붐붐)	2016	16	—	—	—	5	—	KOR: 178,168	—N/a	Going Seventeen
"Don't Wanna Cry" (울고 싶지 않아)	2017	12	3	—	—	3	—	KOR: 342,539; US: 3,000	RIAJ: Silver (Note: Certification for streaming)	Al1
"Clap" (박수)	2017	11	36	50	—	4	—	KOR: 155,875	RIAJ: Gold (Note: Certification for streaming)	Teen, Age
"Thanks" (고맙다)	2018	19	14	—	—	4	—	—N/a	—N/a	Director's Cut
"Oh My!" (어쩌나)	2018	15	2	38	—	6	—	—N/a	—N/a	You Make My Day
"Getting Closer" (숨이 차)	2018	86	3	—	—	5	—	US: 1,000	—N/a	You Made My Dawn
"Home"	2019	18	1	34	—	7	—	US: 1,000	—N/a	You Made My Dawn
"Hit"	2019	64	31	20	—	4	—	—N/a	RIAJ: Gold (Note: Certification for streaming)	An Ode
"Fear" (독 : Fear)	2019	66	6	24	—	6	—	—N/a	—N/a	An Ode
"Left & Right"	2020	8	12	50	—	8	—	—N/a	RIAJ: Gold (Note: Certification for streaming)	Heng:garæ
"Home;Run"	2020	16	29	40	—	22	—	—N/a	RIAJ: Gold (Note: Certification for streaming)	Semicolon
"Ready to Love"	2021	21	38	38	—	5	188	—N/a	RIAJ: Gold (Note: Certification for streaming)	Your Choice
"Rock with You"	2021	6	20	25	—	5	68	—N/a	RIAJ: Gold (Note: Certification for streaming)	Attacca
"Hot"	2022	7	11	11	—	3	91	—N/a	RIAJ: Gold (Note: Certification for streaming)	Face the Sun
"_World"	2022	4	21	20	—	12	—	—N/a	RIAJ: Gold (Note: Certification for streaming)	Sector 17
"Super" (손오공)	2023	3	5	7	15	8	37	—N/a	RIAJ: Platinum (Note: Certification for streaming)	FML
"F*ck My Life"	2023	7	—	—	40	—	—	—N/a	—N/a	FML
"God of Music" (음악의신)	2023	1	2	14	26	9	67	JPN: 1,348 (dig.)	RIAJ: Gold (Note: Certification for streaming)	Seventeenth Heaven
"Maestro"	2024	1	3	17	18	5	50	JPN: 2,207 (dig.)	—N/a	17 Is Right Here
"Love, Money, Fame" (featuring DJ Khaled)	2024	1	5	24	39	4	50	—N/a	—N/a	Spill the Feels
"Thunder"	2025	1	—	12	18	8	41	—N/a	—N/a	Happy Burstday
"—" denotes releases that did not chart or were not released in that region.

==== Japanese singles ====
List of Japanese singles, with selected chart positions, sales and certifications, showing year released and album name
Title	Year	Peak chart positions			Sales (Note: Sales figures for tracks are based on digital downloads, except noted.)	Certifications	Album
Title	Year	JPN	JPN Hot	US World	Sales	Certifications	Album
"Call Call Call!"	2018	—	28	16	—N/a	—N/a	We Make You
"Happy Ending"	2019	2	2	—	JPN: 291,974 (phy.)	RIAJ: Platinum (phy.)	Non-album singles
"Fallin' Flower" (舞い落ちる花びら)	2020	1	1	21	JPN: 500,000 (phy.)	RIAJ: 2× Platinum (phy.); RIAJ: Gold (str.)	Non-album singles
"24H"	2020	34	23	—	—N/a	—N/a	24H
"Not Alone" (ひとりじゃない)	2021	1	1	13	JPN: 425,160 (phy.)	RIAJ: 2× Platinum (phy.)	Non-album singles
"Power of Love" (あいのちから)	2021	1	2	—	JPN: 155,766 (phy.)	RIAJ: Platinum (phy.)	Non-album singles
"Dream"	2022	23	27	—	—N/a	—N/a	Dream
"Sara Sara"	2023	29	32	—	—N/a	—N/a	Always Yours
"Ima (Even If the World Ends Tomorrow)" (今 (明日 世界が終わっても))	2023	29	30	—	—N/a	RIAJ: Gold (str.)	Always Yours
"Shohikigen" (消費期限)	2024	1	2	—	JPN: 418,202 (phy.)	RIAJ: 3× Platinum (phy.)	Non-album single
"—" denotes releases that did not chart or were not released in that region.

==== English singles ====
List of English singles, with selected chart positions, sales, and certifications, showing year released and album name
Title	Year	Peak chart positions				Certifications	Album
Title	Year	KOR	KOR Billb.	JPN Hot	WW	Certifications	Album
"Darl+ing"	2022	54	42	15	78	RIAJ: Gold (Note: Certification for streaming)	Face the Sun

=== As collaborating artist ===
List of collaboration singles, with collaborator, selected chart positions, and sales, showing year released and album name
Title	Year	Peak chart positions		Sales	Album
Title	Year	KOR	US World	Sales	Album
"Q&A" (with Ailee) (Note: Credited as Seventeen but only features members S.Coups, Vernon, Woozi)	2015	58	3	KOR: 91,343	Non-album singles
"Chocolate" (with Yoon Jong-shin) (Note: Credited as Seventeen but only features the group's vocal unit)	2016	—	—	KOR: 19,475	Non-album singles
"Moon" (꿈속의 문; lit. 'Memory of the Moon') (with Astro, Rocky, Viviz, I.M, Bang Chan, Moon Sua, Minhyuk, Kihyun, Chani, Hello Gloom, Choi Yoo-jung and Kim Do-yeon) (Note: Credited as Seventeen but only features Seungkwan, Hoshi, Mingyu, DK and Wonwoo)	2025	— (Note: "Moon" did not enter the Circle Digital Chart, but peaked at number 61 on the component Download Chart.)	4	—N/a	Non-album singles
"—" denotes releases that did not chart or were not released in that region.

== Other charted songs ==
List of other charted songs, showing year released, chart positions, sales and album name
Title	Year	Peak chart positions				Sales	Album
Title	Year	KOR	KOR Billb.	CHN	US World	Sales	Album
"Fronting" (표정관리)	2015	—	—	—	21	KOR: 6,223	Boys Be
"OMG"	2015	—	—	—	23	KOR: 4,865	Boys Be
"Rock"	2015	—	—	—	19	KOR: 6,365	Boys Be
"No F.U.N."	2016	—	—	—	7	KOR: 19,102	Love & Letter (Repackage)
"Healing" (힐링)	2016	—	—	—	9	KOR: 21,749	Love & Letter (Repackage)
"Simple"	2016	—	—	—	8	KOR: 23,070	Love & Letter (Repackage)
"Space" (끝이 안보여)	2016	—	—	—	15		Love & Letter (Repackage)
"Beautiful"	2016	83	—	—	—	KOR: 26,733	Going Seventeen
"Lean On Me" (기대)	2016	88	—	—	—	KOR: 25,438	Going Seventeen
"Highlight"	2016	90	—	—	8	KOR: 24,621	Going Seventeen
"Smile Flower" (웃음꽃)	2016	99	—	—	—	KOR: 24,880	Going Seventeen
"Habit" (입버릇)	2017	85	2	—	—	KOR: 27,040	Al1
"Swimming Fool"	2017	91	3	—	—	KOR: 25,246	Al1
"Crazy in Love"	2017	95	4	—	—	KOR: 24,105	Al1
"If I"	2017	—	5	—	—	KOR: 23,106	Al1
"My I"	2017	—	6	—	—	KOR: 21,679	Al1
"Without You" (모자를 눌러 쓰고)	2017	64	6	—	—	KOR: 28,493	Teen, Age
"Change Up"	2017	75	7	—	12	KOR: 26,611	Teen, Age
"Pinwheel" (바람개비)	2017	77	8	—	—	KOR: 26,605	Teen, Age
"Campfire" (캠프파이어)	2017	83	10	—	—	KOR: 24,268	Teen, Age
"Bring It" (날 쏘고 가라)	2017	95	13	—	—	KOR: 22,016	Teen, Age
"Hello"	2017	97	11	—	—	KOR: 22,489	Teen, Age
"Trauma"	2017	98	12	—	15	KOR: 22,260	Teen, Age
"Lilili Yabbay" (13월의 춤)	2017	—	14	—	20	KOR: 21,600	Teen, Age
"Flower"	2017	—	15	—	—	KOR: 20,554	Teen, Age
"Rocket"	2017	—	16	—	—	KOR: 20,039	Teen, Age
"Run to You" (지금 널 찾아가고 있어)	2018	83	83	—	—	—N/a	Director's Cut
"Thinkin' About You"	2018	87	—	—	—	—N/a	Director's Cut
"Fallin' for U"	2018	— (Note: "Fallin' for U" peaked at number 95 on the Domestic Gaon Digital Chart.)	—	—	—	—N/a	Director's Cut
"Holiday"	2018	82	5	—	—	—N/a	You Make My Day
"Our Dawn Is Hotter Than Day" (우리의 새벽은 낮보다 뜨겁다)	2018	83	6	—	—	—N/a	You Make My Day
"Come to Me" (나에게로 와)	2018	96	7	—	—	—N/a	You Make My Day
"Good to Me"	2019	80	2	—	—	—N/a	You Made My Dawn
"Hug" (포옹)	2019	91	4	—	—	—N/a	You Made My Dawn
"Chilli" (칠리)	2019	109	—	—	—	—N/a	You Made My Dawn
"Shhh"	2019	114	—	—	—	—N/a	You Made My Dawn
"Lie Again" (거짓말을 해)	2019	138	36	—	—	—N/a	An Ode
"Let Me Hear You Say"	2019	158	38	—	—	—N/a	An Ode
"Snap Shoot"	2019	159	—	—	—	—N/a	An Ode
"247"	2019	165	—	—	—	—N/a	An Ode
"Second Life"	2019	166	42	—	—	—N/a	An Ode
"Happy Ending" (Korean version)	2019	196	—	—	—	—N/a	An Ode
"Fearless"	2020	105	52	—	—	—N/a	Heng:garæ
"I Wish" (좋겠다)	2020	82	45	—	—	—N/a	Heng:garæ
"My My"	2020	63	38	—	—	—N/a	Heng:garæ
"Kidult" (어른 아이)	2020	91	46	—	—	—N/a	Heng:garæ
"Together" (같이 가요)	2020	101	47	—	—	—N/a	Heng:garæ
"All My Love" (겨우)	2020	119	—	—	—	—N/a	Semicolon
"Do Re Mi" (도레미)	2020	123	—	—	—	—N/a	Semicolon
"Hey Buddy"	2020	134	—	—	—	—N/a	Semicolon
"Light a Flame" (마음에 불을 지펴)	2020	139	—	—	—	—N/a	Semicolon
"Ah! Love"	2020	140	—	—	—	—N/a	Semicolon
"Heaven's Cloud"	2021	135	88	—	18	—N/a	Your Choice
"Anyone"	2021	131	—	—	19	—N/a	Your Choice
"Gam3 Bo1"	2021	182	—	—	—	—N/a	Your Choice
"Wave"	2021	191	—	—	—	—N/a	Your Choice
"Same Dream, Same Mind, Same Night" (같은 꿈, 같은 맘, 같은 밤)	2021	177	—	—	—	—N/a	Your Choice
"To You" (소용돌이)	2021	93	94	—	15	—N/a	Attacca
"Crush"	2021	99	—	—	19	—N/a	Attacca
"Pang!"	2021	122	—	—	—	—N/a	Attacca
"Imperfect Love" (매일 그대라서 행복하다)	2021	104	—	—	22	—N/a	Attacca
"I Can't Run Away" (그리워하는 것까지)	2021	116	—	—	25	—N/a	Attacca
"2 Minus 1"	2021	124	—	—	18	—N/a	Attacca
"Don Quixote"	2022	96	—	—	14	—N/a	Face the Sun
"March"	2022	108	—	—	—	—N/a	Face the Sun
"Domino"	2022	105	—	—	—	—N/a	Face the Sun
"Shadow"	2022	111	—	—	15	—N/a	Face the Sun
"'Bout You" (노래해)	2022	115	—	—	—	—N/a	Face the Sun
"If You Leave Me"	2022	127	—	—	—	—N/a	Face the Sun
"Ash"	2022	134	—	—	—	—N/a	Face the Sun
"Circles" (돌고 돌아)	2022	96	—	—	—	—N/a	Sector 17
"Fallin' Flower" (Korean version)	2022	99	—	—	—	—N/a	Sector 17
"Cheers"	2022	100	—	—	—	—N/a	Sector 17
"Fire"	2023	64	—	—	—	—N/a	FML
"I Don't Understand but I Luv U"	2023	67	—	—	—	—N/a	FML
"Dust" (먼지)	2023	44	—	—	—	—N/a	FML
"April Shower"	2023	61	—	—	—	—N/a	FML
"SOS"	2023	53	20	—	—	—N/a	Seventeenth Heaven
"Diamond Days"	2023	65	25	—	—	—N/a	Seventeenth Heaven
"Back 2 Back"	2023	73	—	—	—	—N/a	Seventeenth Heaven
"Monster"	2023	68	—	—	—	—N/a	Seventeenth Heaven
"Yawn" (하품)	2023	75	—	—	—	—N/a	Seventeenth Heaven
"Headliner"	2023	77	—	—	—	—N/a	Seventeenth Heaven
"Lalali"	2024	68	—	—	—	—N/a	17 Is Right Here
"Spell"	2024	81	—	—	—	—N/a	17 Is Right Here
"Cheers to Youth" (청춘찬가)	2024	36	13	—	—	—N/a	17 Is Right Here
"Call! Call! Call!" (Korean version)	2024	156	—	—	—	—N/a	17 Is Right Here
"24H" (Korean version)	2024	200	—	—	—	—N/a	17 Is Right Here
"Ima (Even If the World Ends Tomorrow)" (Korean version)	2024	143	—	—	—	—N/a	17 Is Right Here
"Eyes on You"	2024	68	21	—	—	—N/a	Spill the Feels
"1 to 13"	2024	72	22	—	—	—N/a	Spill the Feels
"Candy" (사탕)	2024	80	—	—	—	—N/a	Spill the Feels
"Rain"	2024	85	—	—	—	—N/a	Spill the Feels
"Water"	2024	91	—	—	—	—N/a	Spill the Feels
"HBD"	2025	84	—	—	—	—N/a	Happy Burstday
"Bad Influence"	2025	112	—	—	—	—N/a	Happy Burstday
"Skyfall" (The8 solo)	2025	52	—	7	—	—N/a	Happy Burstday
"Fortunate Change" (Joshua solo)	2025	25	—	—	—	—N/a	Happy Burstday
"99.9%" (Wonwoo solo)	2025	7	—	—	—	—N/a	Happy Burstday
"Raindrops" (Seungkwan solo)	2025	99	—	—	—	—N/a	Happy Burstday
"Damage" (Hoshi solo; featuring Timbaland)	2025	47	—	—	—	—N/a	Happy Burstday
"Shake It Off" (Mingyu solo)	2025	88	—	—	—	—N/a	Happy Burstday
"Happy Virus" (DK solo)	2025	114	—	—	—	—N/a	Happy Burstday
"Destiny" (운명; Woozi solo)	2025	104	—	—	—	—N/a	Happy Burstday
"Shining Star" (Vernon solo)	2025	109	—	—	—	—N/a	Happy Burstday
"Gemini" (쌍둥이자리; Jun solo)	2025	72	—	—	—	—N/a	Happy Burstday
"Trigger" (Dino solo)	2025	120	—	—	—	—N/a	Happy Burstday
"Coincidence" (우연; Jeonghan solo)	2025	53	—	—	—	—N/a	Happy Burstday
"Jungle" (S.Coups solo)	2025	42	—	—	—	—N/a	Happy Burstday
"—" denotes releases that did not chart or were not released in that region.

== Soundtrack appearances ==
Title	Year	Peak chart positions			Members	Album
Title	Year	KOR	KOR Hot	JPN Hot	Members	Album
"A-Teen"	2018	17	—	—	Joshua; Hoshi; Woozi; Vernon; Dino	A-Teen OST
"Brothers for One Time" (兄弟一回)	2019	—	—	—	Jun; The8	Seven Days OST
"9-Teen"	2019	69	69	—	All	A-Teen 2 OST
"Sweetest Thing"	2019	—	—	—	Joshua; Wonwoo; DK; Seungkwan; Dino	Chocolate OST
"Warrior" (逆燃)	2021	—	—	—	Joshua; Jun; The8; Mingyu; Vernon	Falling into Your Smile OST
"Is It Still Beautiful" (여전히 아름다운지)	2021	25	22	—	Woozi; DK; Seungkwan	Hospital Playlist OST
"Betting" (with Shingo Katori)	2023	—	—	31	Jeonghan; Mingyu; Seungkwan	War of Traps OST
"Our Vacation"	2023	—	—	—	Joshua; Hoshi	Bro and Marble in Dubai OST
"Shingiru" (신기루)	2023	—	—	—	Joshua; Hoshi	Bro and Marble in Dubai OST
"Where Love Passed"	2025	—	—	—	S.Coups; Joshua; Jun; Hoshi; Woozi; The8; Mingyu; DK; Seungkwan; Vernon; Dino	Hatsukoi Dogs OST
"Tiny Light"	2026	—	—	69	S.Coups; Joshua; Jun; Hoshi; Woozi; The8; Mingyu; DK; Seungkwan; Vernon; Dino	Beastars OST
"—" denotes releases that did not chart or were not released in that region.

== See also ==
- List of songs written by Seventeen members
