= Shohikigen =

2024 Japanese single by Seventeen

- Digital cover

Single by Seventeen
- Language: Japanese
- Released: November 11, 2024 (digital); November 27, 2024 (physical)
- Genre: J-pop
- Length: 3:10
- Label: Hybe Japan; Universal Music Japan
- Composers: Woozi; Bumzu; Park Ki-tae
- Lyricists: Woozi; Bumzu; Barbora

Seventeen singles chronology
"Love, Money, Fame" (2024)	"Shohikigen" (2024)	"Thunder" (2025)

Seventeen Japanese singles chronology
"Ima (Even If the World Ends Tomorrow)" (2023)	"Shohikigen" (2024)

Music video
- "Shohikigen" on YouTube

"Shohikigen" (Japanese: 消費期限; lit. 'Expiration date') is a song recorded by South Korean boy group Seventeen. It was released digitally on November 11, 2024, through Hybe Japan and Universal Music Japan, and was released physically on November 27, 2024. The song marked the group's fourth time topping Japan's Oricon Singles Chart.

== Background and release ==
On August 5, 2024, Seventeen announced they would be releasing a new Japanese single in the second half of the year. In September 2024, the group announced that the upcoming Japanese single would be the theme song for NHK's 2024 TV drama Mirai no Watashi ni Bukkama Sareru!?.

On the final day of their Right Here World Tour's United States leg, Seventeen announced the release of the new Japanese single, set to be physically released two days before the tour's first shows in Japan. The a-side, "Shohikigen", was confirmed to be the song featured on the NHK drama. The song has two b-sides: the Japanese versions of "Circles" from Sector 17 (2022) and "Maestro" from 17 Is Right Here (2024).

"Shohikigen" was first performed at the group's first Right Here tour stop in Japan, at the Vantelin Dome in Nagoya, on December 29, 2024. A recording of the performance on December 30 was featured on Nippon Television's 2024 Best Artist broadcast.

== Composition ==
"Shohikigen" has been described as a ballad with soft vocals that evoke feelings of sadness and nostalgia. Lyrically, the song explores the "expiration date" of "even the strongest feelings".

The lyrics for "Shohikigen" were written by Woozi and Bumzu, with Japanese lyrics written by Barbora. The song was produced by Woozi, Bumzu, and Park Ki-tae, with arrangement by Bumzu, Park, and Nmore. Barbora was also credited for the Japanese lyrics of "Circles" and "Maestro".

== Music video ==
The music video for "Shohikigen" was released on November 27, directed by 725 of Sl8ight Visual Lab. The video is a sequel to the music video for the group's 2023 single "Ima (Even If the World Ends Tomorrow", exploring the concept of a world that has ended, with the members in a spaceship-like setting.

== Track listing ==
Shohikigen track listing
No.	Title	Lyrics	Music	Arrangement	Length
1.	"Shohikigen" (消費期限)	Woozi; Bumzu; Barbora (Note: Credited for Japanese lyrics)	Woozi; Bumzu; Park Ki-tae	Bumzu; Park; Nmore	3:10
2.	"Circles" (Japanese version)	Woozi; Bumzu; Barbora	Woozi; Bumzu; Nmore	Bumzu; Nmore	3:59
3.	"Maestro" (Japanese version)	Woozi; Bumzu; Barbora	Woozi; Bumzu; Ninos Hanna; Andreas Oberg; Gabriel Brandes; Justin Starling; Maya Rose; Niklas Jarelius Persson; William Segerdahl; Yeom Dong-geon		3:18
Total length:					10:27

== Credits and personnel ==
Adapted from the single's Melon page, for all three songs.

Recording and management

- Recorded at Universe Factory, Hybe Studio, Prismfilter Studio and Seoul Studio
- Digital editing at Hybe Studio
- Mixing at Klang Studio and Prismfilter Engineer Lab

Personnel

- Seventeen – lead vocals
- Woozi – songwriting, production
- Bumzu – songwriting, production, arranging, piano, programming drums, synthesizer
- Park Ki-tae – production, arranging, guitar
- Nmore – arranging, strings arranging, piano
- Barbora – Japanese songwriting
- Glenn – chorus, recording
- Lee Beom-hun – piano
- Withstring – strings
- Hwang Min-hee – recording
- Jung Ki Hong – recording
- Choi Dyne – recording
- Son Yu-jeong – digital editing
- Gu Jong-pil – mixing
- Rose Hong – mixing (assistant)
- Yeon Eum Children's Choir (Seowoo Kim, Yesung Kim, Jihoo Kim, Tae Eun Kim, Ian Son, Hyun A Song, Jinha Yang, Hyojoo Lee, Jiwoo Jeong, Juwon Han, Yuna Hong) – choir
- Cha Yeji – digital editing
- Shannon – chorus
- Kim Daeyoung – digital editing
- Jin Jeon – mixing
- Anchor – mixing

== Charts ==
=== Weekly chart ===
Weekly chart performance for "Shohikigen"
Chart (2024)	Peak position
Japan (Japan Hot 100)	2
Japan (Oricon)	1
Japan Combined Singles (Oricon)	1
South Korea Download (Circle)	126

=== Monthly charts ===
Monthly chart performance for "Shohikigen"
Chart (2024)	Position
Japan (Oricon)	1

=== Year-end charts ===
2024 year-end chart performance for "Shohikigen"
Chart (2024)	Position
Japan (Oricon)	17

2025 year-end chart performance for "Shohikigen"
Chart (2025)	Position
Japan Top Singles Sales (Billboard Japan)	4
Japan (Oricon)	44

== Certifications ==
Certifications and sales for "Shohikigen"
Region	Certification	Certified units/sales
Japan (RIAJ)	3× Platinum	750,000^{^}
^{^} Shipments figures based on certification alone.
