= New World Tour =

2025–26 concert tour by Seventeen

New_ World Tour
- World tour by Seventeen
- Promotional poster
- Associated album: Happy Burstday
- Start date: September 13, 2025
- End date: April 5, 2026
- No. of shows: 22 in Asia; 9 in North America; 31 total
- Attendance: 840,000

Seventeen concert chronology
- Right Here World Tour (2024–25); New_ World Tour (2025–26)

The New_ World Tour was the sixth concert tour by South Korean band Seventeen. It began on September 13, 2025, in Incheon, South Korea, and concluded at the same venue with two encore shows on April 4 and 5, 2026. The tour was performed by nine members of the group, with Jeonghan, Wonwoo, Hoshi and Woozi all completing their mandatory military services during the tour's duration.

== Background ==
In April 2025, Seventeen announced their fifth studio album Happy Burstday. During the announcement for the album, they also revealed that they would be embarking on a new world tour. The tour was officially announced on July 23, set to start with two nights in Incheon, South Korea, and an announcement for ten shows in Japan came later that day.

=== Member participation ===
The promotional poster included only nine members. The tour was performed by nine members of the group, as Jeonghan and Wonwoo were serving as social service workers, while Hoshi and Woozi were absent due to their active-duty military enlistments.

Jeonghan began serving as a social service worker on September 26, 2024. Wonwoo began serving as a social service workers on April 3, 2025.

Jeonghan, Wonwoo, Hoshi, and Woozi attended the second Incheon concert on September 14, 2025, as audience members. Woozi enlisted for active duty on September 15, followed by Hoshi on September 16.

== Promotion ==
Similarly to previous tours, Seventeen and Pledis held events for fans at various stops to commemorate the concerts. In Seoul, a collaboration with Airbnb was held for accommodation, and the group's choreographer and vocal trainer led classes for fans. In Hong Kong, the events were held under the name "Caratia", after the name of their fan-club, including a drone show at Wan Chai Park.

== Setlist ==
The following set list is obtained from the September 13 show in Incheon. It is not intended to represent all dates throughout the tour.

1. "Bad Influence"
2. "HBD"
3. "Thunder"
4. "Domino"
5. "Network Love"
6. "Trigger" (Dino solo)
7. "Gemini" (Jun solo)
8. "Shining Star" (Vernon solo)
9. "SOS"
10. "F*ck My Life"
11. "Love, Money, Fame"
12. "Darl+ing"
13. "Fortunate Change" (Joshua solo)
14. "Happy Virus" (DK solo)
15. "Raindrops" (Seungkwan solo)
16. "Skyfall" (The8 solo)
17. "Shake It Off" (Mingyu solo)
18. "Jungle" (S.Coups solo)
19. "Hot"
20. "Highlight"
21. "Rock"
22. "Hit"
23. "Rock with You"
  Encore
24. "A-Teen"
25. "9-Teen"
26. "20"
27. "To You"
28. "_World"
29. "Eyes on you"
30. "Very Nice"

== Tour dates ==
Key
‡	Indicates performances streamed simultaneously on Weverse Concerts

List of concerts, showing dates, cities, countries, venues, attendance and revenue
Date	City	Country	Venue	Attendance	Revenue	Ref.
September 13, 2025 ‡	Incheon	South Korea	Incheon Asiad Main Stadium	54,000	—	
September 14, 2025 ‡	Incheon	South Korea	Incheon Asiad Main Stadium	54,000	—	
September 27, 2025	Hong Kong	China	Kai Tak Stadium	76,292	$16,408,403	
September 28, 2025	Hong Kong	China	Kai Tak Stadium	76,292	$16,408,403	
October 11, 2025	Tacoma	United States	Tacoma Dome	574,000	$88 million	
October 16, 2025	Los Angeles	United States	BMO Stadium	574,000	$88 million	
October 17, 2025	Los Angeles	United States	BMO Stadium	574,000	$88 million	
October 21, 2025	Austin	United States	Moody Center	574,000	$88 million	
October 22, 2025	Austin	United States	Moody Center	574,000	$88 million	
October 26, 2025	Sunrise	United States	Amerant Bank Arena	574,000	$88 million	
October 27, 2025	Sunrise	United States	Amerant Bank Arena	574,000	$88 million	
October 29, 2025	Washington, DC	United States	Capital One Arena	574,000	$88 million	
October 30, 2025	Washington, DC	United States	Capital One Arena	574,000	$88 million	
November 27, 2025	Nagoya	Japan	Vantelin Dome	574,000	$88 million	
November 29, 2025	Nagoya	Japan	Vantelin Dome	574,000	$88 million	
November 30, 2025	Nagoya	Japan	Vantelin Dome	574,000	$88 million	
December 4, 2025	Osaka	Japan	Kyocera Dome	574,000	$88 million	
December 6, 2025	Osaka	Japan	Kyocera Dome	574,000	$88 million	
December 7, 2025	Osaka	Japan	Kyocera Dome	574,000	$88 million	
December 11, 2025	Tokyo	Japan	Tokyo Dome	574,000	$88 million	
December 12, 2025	Tokyo	Japan	Tokyo Dome	574,000	$88 million	
December 20, 2025	Fukuoka	Japan	Fukuoka PayPay Dome	574,000	$88 million	
December 21, 2025	Fukuoka	Japan	Fukuoka PayPay Dome	574,000	$88 million	
February 28, 2026	Hong Kong	China	Kai Tak Stadium	574,000	$88 million	
March 1, 2026	Hong Kong	China	Kai Tak Stadium	574,000	$88 million	
March 7, 2026	Singapore		National Stadium	574,000	$88 million	
March 14, 2026	Bangkok	Thailand	Suphachalasai Stadium	574,000	$88 million	
March 15, 2026	Bangkok	Thailand	Suphachalasai Stadium	574,000	$88 million	
March 21, 2026	Bulacan	Philippines	Philippine Sports Stadium	574,000	$88 million	
April 4, 2026	Incheon	South Korea	Incheon Asiad Main Stadium	50,000	—	
April 5, 2026	Incheon	South Korea	Incheon Asiad Main Stadium	50,000	—	
Total				840,000	—	

== See also ==
- List of Seventeen live performances
- Seventeen discography
