= Right Here World Tour =

2024–2025 concert tour by Seventeen

- World tour by Seventeen
- Promotional poster
- Associated album: Spill the Feels
- Start date: October 12, 2024
- End date: February 16, 2025
- Legs: 4
- No. of shows: 20 in Asia; 10 in North America; 30 total
- Attendance: 1,037,000

Seventeen concert chronology
- Follow Tour (2023–24); Right Here World Tour (2024–25); New_ World Tour (2025–26)

The Right Here World Tour (stylized as Seventeen [Right Here] World Tour, in all caps) was the fifth world tour by South Korean boy group Seventeen. It began on October 12, 2024, at Goyang Stadium, in South Korea, and concluded on February 16, 2025, at Rajamangala National Stadium in Bangkok, Thailand.

== Background ==
Following the conclusion of the group's eighth fan meeting in July 2024, Seventeen released a teaser for their next tour, which revealed that they would perform in South Korea, Japan, Asia, and the United States. On August 6, Seventeen announced that the tour would open on October 12 at Goyang Stadium in South Korea, with the performances simultaneously streamed via Weverse. The nine-show US leg was officially announced later that day. The ten-show Japanese leg was announced the following day. Due to demand, an additional show was added in Los Angeles. A leg in Southeast Asia was announced on September 25. Due to demand, additional shows were announced for Singapore, Jakarta and Bangkok.

=== Member participation ===
On August 12, it was announced that members Jeonghan and Jun would not be participating in the tour, due to Jeonghan enlisting in the military and Jun taking on an acting role in China. As such, the tour was performed by the remaining eleven members of the group. Still, Jeonghan made surprise appearances at the two performances in Goyang, South Korea, in the audience.

== Promotion ==
A pop up event was held with Spotify in October 2024 in Seoul to promote the concerts in Goyang, alongside the then-upcoming release of Spill the Feels.

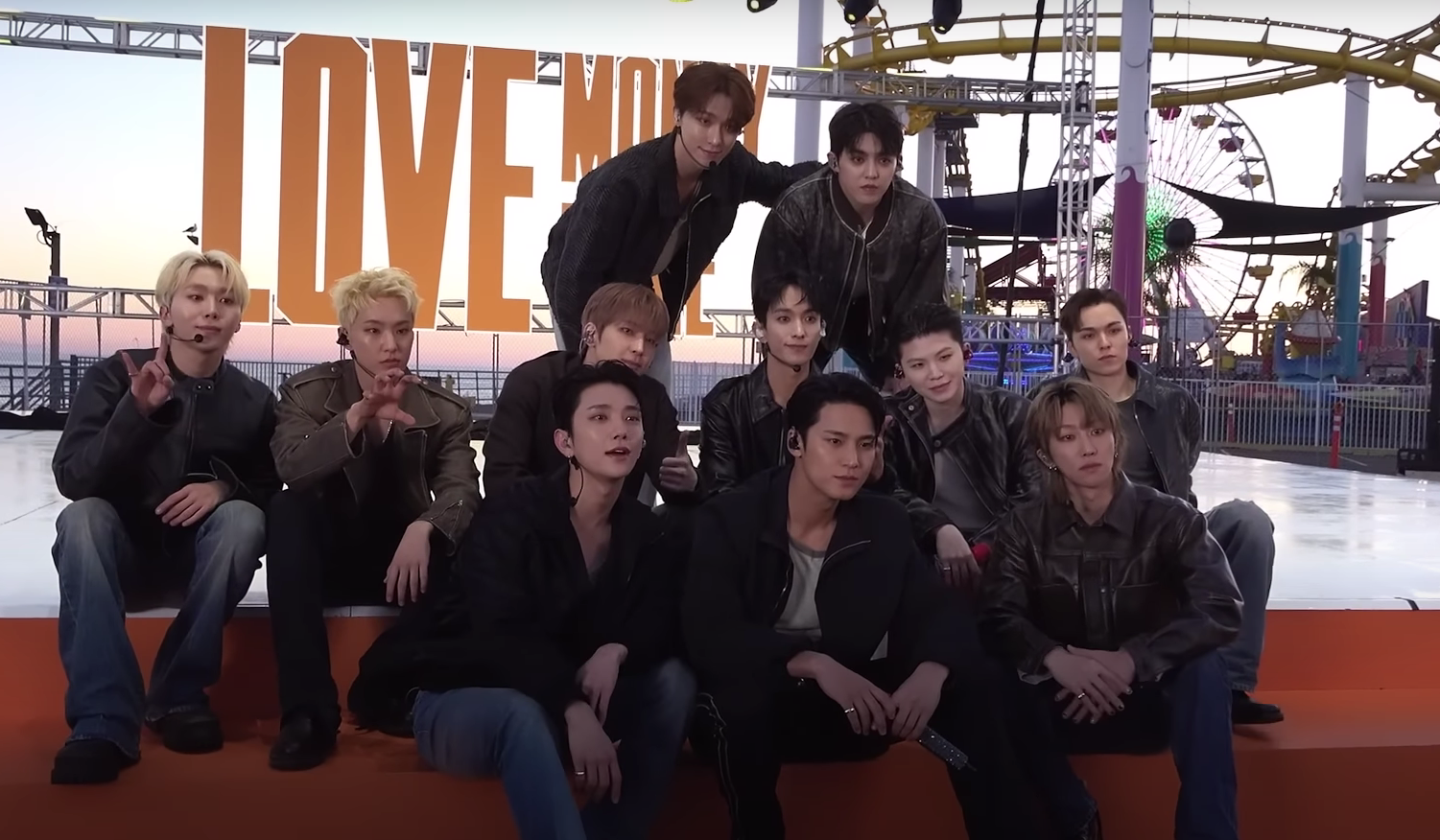
Seventeen performing at the Santa Monica Pier for the 2024 Billboard Music Awards

For the group's New York stops, the Empire State Building was lit up in rose quartz and serenity, the group's official colors, alongside a second pop-up with Spotify as part of "Carat Station NYC", with charm customization, a flower market, and Korean food. In Los Angeles, the group hosted "The City Project", a four day event combining the group's music with the city landscapes from November 7 to 11. The event included a pop up store, various parties with K-pop and EDM music, billboards throughout the city and collaboration menus with local restaurants, and the Santa Monica Pier's Ferris wheel was lit up in rose quartz and serenity. While in Los Angeles, the group recorded a performance of "Love, Money, Fame" for the 2024 Billboard Music Awards, also at the Santa Monica Pier.

In Japan, "The City" events were organised for Nagoya, Tokyo, Osaka and Fukuoka, including stamp rallies, food trucks and pop-up stores. The December 14 concert in Osaka was streamed live in cinemas in 60 countries across the world, with the December 15 and December 22 shows streamed on Weverse.

In the Philippines, another Spotify pop-up was set up at the Glorietta mall in Makati. In Singapore, the Marina Bay Sands was lit up in rose quartz and serenity on January 25 and 26, the first time the resort collaborated with a K-pop group. The collaboration, supported by the Singapore Tourism Board, also included various food specials at restaurants throughout the Marina Bay Sands.

== Reception ==
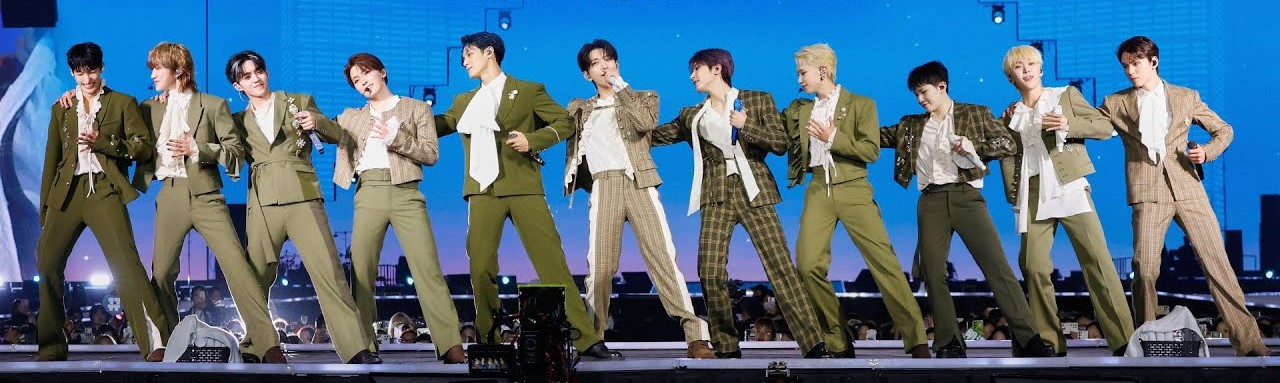
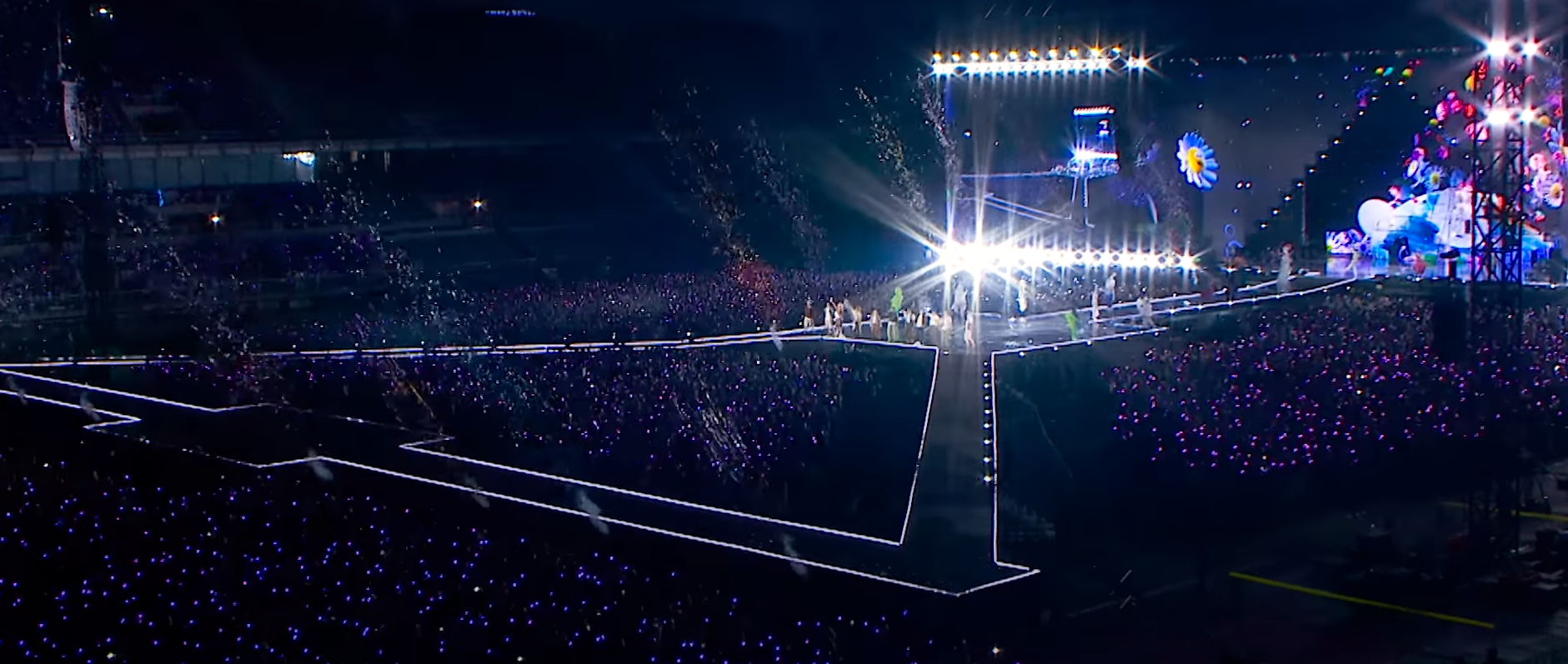
Seventeen performing in Goyang (top) and the stage layout in Japan.

In a positive review for Korea Joongang Daily, Yoon Seung-jin wrote that the tour's Goyang opening stop was a "sonic masterpiece, showcasing Seventeen's impeccable musicianship and undeniable stage presence."

Maria Mata reviewed the tour's New York stops for Melodic Magazine, describing the concerts as "electrifying" and commending the group's charisma and confidence. In a review for the San Francisco Chronicle, Todd Inoue remarked that the tour's first night in Oakland coincided with the 2024 United States presidential election, but the group immediately "assumed their roles as agents of relief". Inoue went on to describe the performance as having "flawless choreography" and an "impressive visual spectacle", but lamented the omission of fan-favorite songs such as "Hot" and "Don Quixote". Mary Siroky reviewed the final US stop of the tour in Los Angeles for Consequence, commenting on the almost-decade long career of the group and how the show demonstrated their bond, their repertoire and their journey to their first performance at a stadium in the US.

Nica Glorioso reviewed the tour's Bocaue stop for Nylon Manila. In her review, Glorioso noted the group's energy throughout the three hour set and the use of a live band for the encore as two of her thirteen highlights from the weekend. Reviewing their Singapore concert, Belinda Poh wrote for HallyuSG that the band is a "gift that never stops giving", serving up dark, powerful and edgy performances whilst showing off their softer charms. Jan Lee also reviewed the concert for The Straits Times, commending the group's development since their last show in the city in 2022. Lee cited a transition from "boisterous boys-next-door" to "bona fide superstars", that corresponded to the venue upgrade from 2022's show at Singapore Indoor Stadium to the much larger National Stadium.

== Set list ==
The following set list is obtained from the October 13, 2024, show in Goyang. It is not intended to represent all dates throughout the tour.

1. "Fear"
2. "Fearless"
3. "Maestro"
4. "Ash"
5. "Crush"
6. "Water" (Hip hop team)
7. "Monster" (Hip hop team)
8. "Rain" (Performance team)
9. "Lilili Yabbay" (Performance team)
10. "Candy" (Vocal team)
11. "Cheers to Youth" (Vocal team)
12. "Our Dawn is Hotter than Day"
13. "Not Alone" (Korean version)
14. "Oh My!"
15. "Snap Shoot"
16. "God of Music"
17. "Ima (Even If the World Ends Tomorrow)" (Korean version)
18. "Home"
19. "Love, Money, Fame"
20. "March"
21. "Super"
  Encore
22. "Adore U"
23. "'Bout You"
24. "Campfire"
25. "If You Leave Me"
26. "Very Nice"

=== Notes ===
- For the United States leg, "Not Alone", "Our Dawn is Hotter than Day", "Ima (Even If the World Ends Tomorrow)" and "If You Leave Me" were removed from the core setlist.
- For the United States leg, the encore was made up of various combinations of "Very Nice", "Hit", "Call Call Call!", "Snap Shoot", "Hit", "Hot", "Fighting", "Holiday", "Back It Up", "Cheers", "Eyes on You" and "Healing".
- Beginning with the second Rosemont show, the group performed surprise songs while delivering speeches, mostly selected from audience requests. For that show, the surprise songs were "Eyes on You", "Spell", "Clap", "Mansae", and "Lalali".
- For the first Elmont show, the surprise songs were "Don Quixote", "Fighting", "Cheers", and "Lalali".
- For the second Elmont show, the surprise songs were "Ready to Love", "Shining Diamond", "Mansae", "Shadow" and "Fighting".
- For the first San Antonio show, the surprise songs were "Mansae", "_World" and "Heaven's Cloud".
- For the second San Antonio show, the surprise songs were "Clap", "SOS", "Boom Boom", "Headliner", "Spell" and "Hit Song".
- For the first Oakland show, the surprise songs were "_World", "Darl+ing", "To You", "Our Dawn is Hotter than Day", "1 to 13" and "Boom Boom".
- For the second Oakland show, the surprise songs were "Getting Closer", "Hot", "Same Dream, Same Mind, Same Night", "Kidult", "Moonwalker", "Fronting" and "2 Minus 1".
- For the first Los Angeles show, the surprise songs were "Heaven's Cloud", "Pretty U", "Clap", "Let Me Hear You Say", "I Don't Understand But I Luv U", "20" and "Gam3 Bo1". "Our Dawn is Hotter than Day" was also added to the setlist in Los Angeles as part of the encore.
- For the second Los Angeles show, the surprise songs were "Crazy in Love," "Rock With You," "Headliner", "Don't Wanna Cry" and "Change Up".
- For the Japan leg of the tour, "Not Alone", "Our Dawn is Hotter than Day" and "Ima (Even If the World Ends Tomorrow)" returned to the setlist; the new Japanese single "Shohikigen" replaced "Home", and "Call Call Call!" replaced "If You Leave Me" in the encore.
- For the Bocaue shows, surprise songs included "Rock with you", "Darling", "Cheers", "'bout you", "Fighting", and "CBZ (Prime Time)".

== Tour dates ==
Key
‡	Indicates performances streamed simultaneously on Weverse Concerts

Concert dates
Date	City	Country	Venue	Attendance	Revenue	Ref.
October 12, 2024 ‡	Goyang	South Korea	Goyang Stadium	58,000	$6,167,744	
October 13, 2024 ‡	Goyang	South Korea	Goyang Stadium	58,000	$6,167,744	
October 22, 2024	Rosemont	United States	Allstate Arena	21,808	$2,690,976	
October 23, 2024	Rosemont	United States	Allstate Arena	21,808	$2,690,976	
October 25, 2024	Elmont	United States	UBS Arena	25,532	$4,628,841	
October 27, 2024	Elmont	United States	UBS Arena	25,532	$4,628,841	
October 31, 2024	San Antonio	United States	Frost Bank Center	—	—	
November 1, 2024	San Antonio	United States	Frost Bank Center	—	—	
November 5, 2024	Oakland	United States	Oakland Arena	46,820	$2,988,713	
November 6, 2024	Oakland	United States	Oakland Arena	46,820	$2,988,713	
November 9, 2024	Los Angeles	United States	BMO Stadium	43,100	$8,100,000	
November 10, 2024	Los Angeles	United States	BMO Stadium	43,100	$8,100,000	
November 29, 2024	Nagoya	Japan	Vantelin Dome	76,000	$8,300,000	
November 30, 2024	Nagoya	Japan	Vantelin Dome	76,000	$8,300,000	
December 4, 2024	Tokyo	Japan	Tokyo Dome	87,800	$9,600,000	
December 5, 2024	Tokyo	Japan	Tokyo Dome	87,800	$9,600,000	
December 12, 2024	Osaka	Japan	Kyocera Dome	112,150	$12,268,956	
December 14, 2024	Osaka	Japan	Kyocera Dome	112,150	$12,268,956	
December 15, 2024 ‡	Osaka	Japan	Kyocera Dome	112,150	$12,268,956	
December 19, 2024	Fukuoka	Japan	Mizuho PayPay Dome	120,000	—	
December 21, 2024	Fukuoka	Japan	Mizuho PayPay Dome	120,000	—	
December 22, 2024 ‡	Fukuoka	Japan	Mizuho PayPay Dome	120,000	—	
January 18, 2025	Bocaue	Philippines	Philippine Sports Stadium	57,600	$12,800,000	
January 19, 2025	Bocaue	Philippines	Philippine Sports Stadium	57,600	$12,800,000	
January 25, 2025	Singapore	Singapore	National Stadium	74,000	$15,900,000	
January 26, 2025	Singapore	Singapore	National Stadium	74,000	$15,900,000	
February 8, 2025	Jakarta	Indonesia	Jakarta International Stadium	64,819	$10,195,329	
February 9, 2025	Jakarta	Indonesia	Jakarta International Stadium	64,819	$10,195,329	
February 15, 2025	Bangkok	Thailand	Rajamangala National Stadium	68,848	$12,118,694	
February 16, 2025	Bangkok	Thailand	Rajamangala National Stadium	68,848	$12,118,694	
Total				842,000 / 1,037,000 (Note: The 1,037,000 figure represents the combined online and offline audience.)	$120,900,000	

== See also ==
- Seventeen discography
- List of Seventeen live performances
