= List of Oricon number-one albums of 2024 =

The following is a list of Oricon number-one albums of 2024.

== Chart history ==
List of Oricon number-one albums of 2024
Issue date	Album	Artist(s)	Weekly sales	Ref.
January 1	Road to A	Travis Japan	153,457	
January 8	Yellow Note	Jin Akanishi	17,340	
January 15	Reboot	Treasure	6,965	
January 22	The Vibes	SixTones	496,565	
January 29	Kitto, Zettai, Zettai	≒Joy	87,103	
February 5	Tokimeku Koi to Seishun	Chō Tokimeki Sendenbu	29,580	
February 12	Photogenic	The Jet Boy Bangerz from Exile Tribe	49,734	
February 19	Seventeenth Heaven	Seventeen	74,266	
February 26	Match Up	INI	247,975	
March 4	Easy	Le Sserafim	107,004	
March 11	Trickster	Lil League from Exile Tribe	34,039	
March 18	Seventeenth Heaven	Seventeen	40,932	
March 25	Award	West	234,128	
April 1	Springtime in You	≠Me	59,223	
April 8	Land of Promise	Sandaime J Soul Brothers	67,933	
April 15	Minisode 3: Tomorrow	Tomorrow X Together	174,250	
April 22	Science Fiction	Hikaru Utada	171,882	
April 29	How?	BoyNextDoor	76,786	
May 6	Science Fiction	Hikaru Utada	30,997	
May 13	17 Is Right Here	Seventeen	333,267	
May 20	Synopsis	Kis-My-Ft2	125,971	
May 27	You Had Me at Hello	Zerobaseone	46,509	
June 3	Ensemble Stars!! Album Series "Trip" Knights	Knights	50,321	
June 10	Sparkle X	The Yellow Monkey	37,203	
June 17	Golden Hour: Part.1	Ateez	42,665	
June 24	+Alpha	Naniwa Danshi	357,420	
July 1	Timelesz	Timelesz	99,525	
July 8	Tadamono	Koshi Inaba	76,406	
July 15	Riizing	Riize	60,327	
July 22	Zanmu	Ado	100,981	
July 29	Romance: Untold	Enhypen	289,099	
August 5	Rise Up	NiziU	196,985	
August 12	Super Eight	Super Eight	183,310	
August 19	JapaNEWS	NEWS	107,572	
August 26	See You There	Takuya Kimura	55,199	
September 2	Lost Corner	Kenshi Yonezu	376,733	
September 9	2:Be	Be First	106,908	
September 16	Iris	Bump of Chicken	113,084	
September 23	19.99	BoyNextDoor	133,956	
September 30	Utopiia	Buddiis	126,634	
October 7	The Highest	WayV	62,748	
October 14	Fiesta	One n' Only	34,419	
October 21	Back to the Pops	Glay	25,773	
October 28	Spill the Feels	Seventeen	409,582	
November 4	Precious Days	Mariya Takeuchi	129,349	
November 11	Rays	Snow Man	1,080,577	
November 18	The Star Chapter: Sanctuary	Tomorrow X Together	292,867	
November 25	Giant	Stray Kids	334,553	
December 2	Romance: Untold -Daydream-	Enhypen	184,619	
December 9	H+	Hey! Say! JUMP	160,257	
December 16	Viisual	Travis Japan	141,371	
December 23	Re: Era	King & Prince	233,485	
December 30	Yukiakari	&Team	334,225	

== See also ==
- List of Oricon number-one singles of 2024
