= List of Oricon number-one singles of 2024 =

The following is a list of Oricon number-one singles of 2024.

== Chart history ==
List of Oricon number-one singles of 2024
Issue date	Song	Artist(s)	Sales	Ref.
January 1	"Anti Confiture"	≠Me	182,176	
January 8	"Schrödinger"	KinKi Kids	179,227	
January 15	"Heartbreaker" / "C'monova"	Kis-My-Ft2	201,012	
January 22	"Shekira"	Liella!	13,846	
January 29	"Kimi wa Nani o Kokai Suru no ka?"	STU48	20,502	
February 5	"Anthropos"	Kanjani Eight	159,384	
February 12	"Snowin'"	DXTeen	35,111	
February 19	"Bremen"	OWV	21,210	
February 26	"Love Trigger" / "We'll Go Together"	Snow Man	1,192,951	
March 4	"Ikutsu no Koro ni Modoritai no ka?"	Sakurazaka46	433,810	
March 11	"Ai no Hologram"	SKE48	271,122	
March 18	"Puzzle"	Sexy Zone	277,608	
March 25	"Colorcon Wink"	AKB48	320,988	
April 1	"Yura Yura (Unmei no Hana)"	Zerobaseone	302,315	
April 8	"Eden"	Knight A	50,477	
April 15	"Tokimeki United"	Real Idol Project	81,972	
April 22	"Chance wa Byōdō"	Nogizaka46	517,872	
April 29	Mirai ("Click" / "Sugar Bomb")	Me:I	232,688	
May 6	"Heart" / "Fate"	West.	265,995	
May 13	"Neiro"	SixTones	523,078	
May 20	"Kimi wa Honeydew"	Hinatazaka46	448,824	
May 27	"A-Beginning"	Ae! Group	625,044	
June 3	"Halfmoon" / "Moooove!!"	King & Prince	305,258	
June 10	Hitchhiker ("Love Seeker")	JO1	505,623	
June 17	"Chikai no Hanataba o (With You)"	SutoPuri	223,731	
June 24	"Taiikukan Disco"	≒Joy	104,604	
July 1	1st Is:sue ("Connect" / "Static")	Is:sue	116,408	
July 8	The Frame ("Loud")	INI	672,867	
July 15	Chikai ("We'll Never Change")	Tomorrow X Together	358,845	
July 22	"Gong" / "Koko ni Kaette Kite"	SixTones	426,087	
July 29	"Koi Tsunjatta"	AKB48	295,877	
August 5	"24 Karats Gold Genesis"	The Rampage from Exile Tribe	219,758	
August 12	"Breakout" / "Kimi wa Boku no Mono"	Snow Man	1,067,101	
August 19	"Aoarashi"	&Team	338,887	
August 26	"Nandaka Sentimental na Toki no Uta" / "Saikiyō"	Morning Musume '24	103,399	
September 2	"Cheat Day"	Nogizaka46	509,819	
September 9	"Koisuru Hikari"	Naniwa Danshi	400,104	
September 16	"Lucky"	Riize	213,730	
September 23	"Mā Ikka!"	West.	242,275	
September 30	"Zettaiteki Dairokkan"	Hinatazaka46	475,887	
October 7	"UMP"	Hey! Say! JUMP	216,522	
October 14	"Where Do We Go"	JO1	542,527	
October 21	"Gotta Be"	Ae! Group	390,765	
October 28	"Hatsukoi Cinderella"	≒Joy	97,573	
November 4	"I Want Tomorrow to Come"	Sakurazaka46	487,957	
November 11	The View ("WMDA (Where My Drums At)")	INI	630,622	
November 18	"Awa Awa"	Bullet Train	138,447	
November 25	"Acchi Muite Hoi"	NEWS	132,713	
December 2	"Because"	Timelesz	252,628	
December 9	"Shohikigen"	Seventeen	418,202	
December 16	Last Bell ("Last Festival")	TWS	73,699	
December 23	"Hodōkyō"	Nogizaka46	484,194	
December 30	"Eikyu Hours"	Aqours	131,827	

== See also ==
- List of Oricon number-one albums of 2024
