= 17 Is Right Here =

2024 compilation album by Seventeen

- Digital cover

Compilation album by Seventeen
- Released: April 29, 2024
- Recorded: 2015–2024
- Length: 104:02
- Languages: Korean; English
- Label: Pledis
- Producers: Woozi; Bumzu

Seventeen chronology
Seventeenth Heaven (2023)	17 Is Right Here (2024)	Spill the Feels (2024)

Singles from 17 Is Right Here
- 1. "Maestro" Released: April 29, 2024

17 Is Right Here is the first Korean-language compilation album by the South Korean group Seventeen, released on April 29, 2024. Touted as a greatest hits album, it features all of the band's Korean-language singles from their debut until 2024, alongside Korean versions of all the band's Japanese-language singles, four new unreleased songs including the lead single "Maestro", and the previously unreleased instrumental for their debut single "Adore U".

== Background ==
The album was initially announced during a performance in Incheon during Seventeen's Follow Tour on March 31, 2024, where the group mentioned they would be releasing two albums in 2024. Directly following the concert, Pledis Entertainment released a teaser for the album, sharing that it would be a compilation. The teaser featured animation work by Max Dalton, best known for his work with Wes Anderson on The French Dispatch and The Grand Budapest Hotel.

It is the group's second compilation album, following the 2023 release of Always Yours, an equivalent compilation of the band's Japanese-language releases to date. It features the band's greatest hits and includes the four new tracks: "Spell", "Cheers to Youth", "Lalali", and lead single "Maestro".

== Promotion ==
On April 7, 2024, Seventeen shared the link for 17is-right-here.com, a website with various links to content that would be "unzipped" throughout the leadup to the album's release. Throughout the following weeks in the lead up to the album's release, previously unreleased photos from previous album promotions were released via the website.

On April 17, 2024, Seventeen began sharing concept photos for the compilation album, with visual references to the concept photos for the previous albums. Further photos were released on April 18 and April 20, 2024.

The full track list was released on X (formerly Twitter) on April 19, revealing the lead single "Maestro" and collaborations with Andreas Öberg, Gabriel Brandes, William Segerdahl, among others, including Yeom Dong-geon, a previous collaborator on Seventeen's debut song "Adore U". On April 24, it was revealed that all four new songs would have supporting music videos, to be released weekly, starting with "Maestro" on April 29.

The weekend before the album's Monday release, at an encore concert at Seoul World Cup Stadium, the group performed the songs from the album for the first time.

== Commercial performance ==
On the first day of its release, 17 is Right Here sold more than 2.26 million copies, setting the sales record for compilation albums released by a K-pop act. In Japan, the album recorded sales of over 333,000 units and ranked first in the Oricon Albums Chart for the weekly chart recorded on April 29 to May 5, 2024, breaking the highest weekly album sales record for foreign artists in 2024; this achievement has also marked Seventeen as the foreign artist with the most recorded chart-toppers on Oricon.

== Critical reception ==
Commenting on the album's encapsulation of Seventeen's career, Cristina Jaleru of the Associated Press identified 17 Is Right Here to be "a study of the band's impressive evolution" and noted the new tracks as "a charming offering with less agitative notes and more catchy hooks".

== Track listing ==
All lyrics are written by Woozi and Bumzu, with any additional writers listed below; all music is composed by Woozi and Bumzu, unless noted, with any additional composers listed below.

17 Is Right Here: Disc 1 track listing
No.	Title	Lyrics	Music	Arrangement	Length
1.	"Maestro"		Ninos Hanna; Andreas Oberg; Gabriel Brandes; Justin Starling; Maya Rose; Niklas Jarelius Persson; William Segerdahl; Yeom Dong-geon		3:18
2.	"Lalali" (performed by the Hip Hop Team)	S.Coups; Wonwoo; Mingyu; Vernon	Bumzu	Bumzu	2:51
3.	"Spell" (performed by the Performance Team)	The8; Dino		Bumzu	3:17
4.	"Cheers to Youth" (청춘찬가; performed by the Vocal Team)			Bumzu; Woozi; Ohway!	3:11
5.	"Call Call Call!" (Korean version; from We Make You, 2018)		Park Ki-tae	Bumzu; Park	3:20
6.	"Happy Ending" (Korean version; 2019)			Bumzu; Anchor	3:29
7.	"Fallin' Flower" (Korean version; 2020)	Dino	Park	Bumzu; Park	3:31
8.	"24H" (Korean version; from 24H, 2020)		Park	Park	3:09
9.	"Not Alone" (Korean version; 2021)		Park	Park	3:19
10.	"Power of Love" (Korean version; 2021)		Nmore	Nmore	3:50
11.	"Dream" (Korean version; from Dream, 2022)		Lee Beom-hoon	Lee	3:06
12.	"Ima (Even If the World Ends Tomorrow)" (Korean version; from Always Yours, 2023)		Hwang Hyeon (MonoTree)	Bumzu; Hwang	3:12
Total length:					39:34

Disc 2 track listing
No.	Title	Lyrics	Music	Arrangement	Length
1.	"Adore U" (아낀다; from 17 Carat, 2015)	S.Coups; Vernon	Yeom	Woozi; Bumzu; Yeom	3:07
2.	"Mansae" (만세; from Boys Be, 2015)	S.Coups; Wonwoo; Mingyu; Vernon		Woozi; Bumzu	3:07
3.	"Pretty U" (예쁘다; from Love & Letter, 2016)	S.Coups; Vernon; Seungkwan	Won Young-heon; Dong Ne-hyeong	Woozi; Bumzu	3:27
4.	"Very Nice" (아주 NICE; from Love & Letter Repackage Album, 2016)	S.Coups; Vernon		Bumzu	3:12
5.	"Boom Boom" (붐붐; from Going Seventeen, 2016)	S.Coups; Wonwoo; Mingyu; Vernon		Bumzu	3:26
6.	"Don't Wanna Cry" (울고 싶지 않아; from Al1, 2017)	S.Coups; Jeonghan; Hoshi; Andrew Taggart; Guy Berryman; Jonny Buckland; Will Champion; Chris Martin	Taggart; Berryman; Buckland; Champion; Martin		3:23
7.	"Clap" (박수; from Teen, Age, 2017)	Vernon; Jeonghan; Hoshi; Mingyu; DK; Seungkwan	Woozi; Bumzu; Park	Woozi; Bumzu; Park	2:47
8.	"Thanks" (고맙다; from Director's Cut, 2018)	Hoshi			3:33
9.	"Oh My!" (어쩌나; from You Make My Day, 2018)	S.Coups; Vernon		Bumzu; Park	3:15
10.	"Home" (from You Made My Dawn, 2019)		Seungkwan	Bumzu; Park	3:23
11.	"독: Fear" (from An Ode, 2019)	Vernon; S.Coups	Vernon	Bumzu; Park	2:55
12.	"Left & Right" (from Heng:garæ, 2020)	Vernon		Bumzu	3:21
13.	"Home;Run" (from Semicolon, 2020)	Vernon; Seungkwan	Nmore @Prismfilter	Bumzu; Nmore @Prismfilter	3:04
14.	"Ready to Love" (from Your Choice, 2021)	S.Coups; Mingyu; danke; "hitman" bang; Kyler Niko	"hitman" bang; Wonderkid; Niko; Christoffer Semelius; H.Kenneth	Bumzu; "hitman" bang; Wonderkid	3:06
15.	"Rock with You" (from Attacca, 2021)	Vernon; Joshua; Kim In-hyeong; Jordan Witzigreuter; Cameron Walker; Tim Tan	Josh McClelland; Matt Terry; Witzigreuter; Walker; Tim Tan		3:00
16.	"Hot" (from Face the Sun, 2022)	Dan August Rigo; Ploypaworawan Praison	Tim Tan; Rigo; Praison; Softserveboy (153/Joombas); Alex Keem (153/Joombas)		3:17
17.	"_World" (from Sector 17, 2022)	S.Coups; Vernon; Melanie Joy Fontana; Michel "Lindgren" Schulz	Tommy Brown; Steven Franks; Fontana; Schulz		2:58
18.	"F*ck My Life" (from FML, 2023)			Bumzu; BuildingOwner	3:22
19.	"Super" (손오공; from FML, 2023)	S.Coups; Vernon	Rigo		3:20
20.	"God of Music" (음악의 신; from Seventeenth Heaven, 2023)	S.Coups; Mingyu; Vernon	Park	Bumzu; Park; Lee	3:25
Total length:					61:21

Digital download and streaming bonus track
No.	Title	Music	Arrangement	Length
21.	"Adore U" (instrumental; 아낀다; from 17 Carat, 2015)	Yeom	Woozi; Bumzu; Yeom	3:07
Total length:				64:28

== Charts ==
=== Weekly charts ===
Weekly chart performance
Chart (2024)	Peak position
Austrian Albums (Ö3 Austria)	10
Belgian Albums (Ultratop Flanders)	13
Belgian Albums (Ultratop Wallonia)	7
Croatian International Albums (HDU)	5
German Albums (Offizielle Top 100)	13
Greek Albums (IFPI)	4
Japanese Albums (Oricon)	1
Japanese Combined Albums (Oricon)	1
Japanese Hot Albums (Billboard Japan)	1
Portuguese Albums (AFP)	6
South Korean Albums (Circle)	1
Swiss Albums (Schweizer Hitparade)	16
US Billboard 200	5
US World Albums (Billboard)	1

=== Monthly charts ===
Monthly chart performance
Chart (2024)	Position
Japanese Albums (Oricon)	1
South Korean Albums (Circle)	1

=== Year-end charts ===
Year-end chart performance
Chart (2024)	Position
Global Albums (IFPI)	8
Japanese Albums (Oricon)	4
Japanese Combined Albums (Oricon)	3
Japanese Hot Albums (Billboard Japan)	3
South Korean Albums (Circle)	2

== Certifications ==
Certifications
Region	Certification	Certified units/sales
South Korea (KMCA)	3× Million	3,000,000^{^}
South Korea (KMCA) Weverse Albums version	Platinum	250,000^{^}
^{^} Shipments figures based on certification alone.
