= Follow Tour =

2023–2024 concert tour by Seventeen

- Asia tour by Seventeen
- Promotional poster for Follow to Seoul
- Location: Asia
- Associated albums: FML; Always Yours; Seventeenth Heaven; 17 Is Right Here
- Start date: July 21, 2023
- End date: May 26, 2024
- Legs: 4
- No. of shows: 28
- Attendance: 988,141
- Box office: US$111,374,978

Seventeen concert chronology
- Be The Sun World Tour (2022); Follow Tour (2023–24); Right Here World Tour (2024–25)

The Follow Tour (stylized as Seventeen Tour Follow, in all caps) was the third concert tour of Asia headlined by South Korean boy group Seventeen. The tour began on July 21, 2023, at the Gocheok Sky Dome in Seoul, South Korea, and concluded on May 26, 2024, at Nissan Stadium in Yokohama, Japan.

== Background ==
After the release of the EP FML in April 2023, Seventeen announced a concert in Seoul for July 2023 to start the tour, stylized as Follow to Seoul. The Seoul dates were followed by the Follow to Japan leg and the Follow to Asia leg, which consisted of concerts in Bangkok, Manila, and Macao. An encore leg of the tour, branded as Follow Again, covered six additional dates across Incheon, Osaka, and Yokohama. Two shows at the Seoul World Cup Stadium were later added to the middle of the leg. The tour finally concluded at Nissan Stadium in Japan on May 26, 2024, the ninth anniversary of the group's debut. The performance at Nissan Stadium made Seventeen the second K-pop act ever to perform at the venue, after TVXQ.

Various performances were streamed simultaneously on Weverse Concerts to be available for fans worldwide. The initial Seoul concerts, two concerts in the first Japanese leg, the Incheon concerts, and two concerts of the Japanese encore leg were streamed. The final concert of the first Japanese leg, in Fukuoka, was broadcast in real-time in cinemas around the world, with delayed broadcasts in certain timezones.

=== Member participation ===
==== Seungkwan ====
Seungkwan temporarily suspended activities in July 2023 after experiencing health issues and being advised by medical professionals to rest and recover. As a result, he was absent from the opening Follow concerts in Seoul on July 21 and 22. He returned to the stage approximately two months later at the opening concerts of Follow to Japan at Tokyo Dome on September 6 and 7, 2023.

==== S.Coups ====
S.Coups injured his left knee while filming content on August 10, 2023, and was diagnosed with a torn anterior cruciate ligament (ACL). He underwent reconstructive surgery on his ACL and anterolateral ligament on August 21 and subsequently suspended most official activities while undergoing rehabilitation. Although he was unable to participate in the Tokyo Dome concerts as a performing member, he attended the concerts as a spectator and was shown watching from the audience. During the second night's encore, he made a surprise appearance on stage in a wheelchair. He returned to performing with the group at Follow Again to Incheon in March 2024, approximately eight months after his last stage performance. At the concert, S.Coups described it as his return after eight months and noted that he would participate in some stages while sitting out others as he continued his recovery.

==== Jeonghan ====
Jeonghan continued participating in the tour while receiving treatment for a left ankle injury, but underwent surgery on December 14, 2023, after the pain worsened. He subsequently missed the Fukuoka concerts of Follow to Japan and the Follow to Asia concerts in Bangkok, Bulacan, and Macao while recovering. He returned to the stage with S.Coups for Follow Again to Incheon in March 2024, with his participation adjusted to avoid placing excessive strain on his recovering ankle.

== Promotion ==
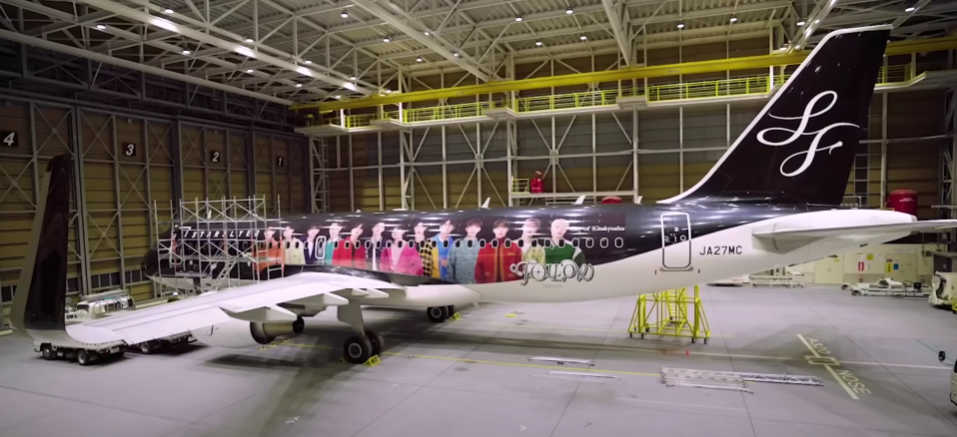
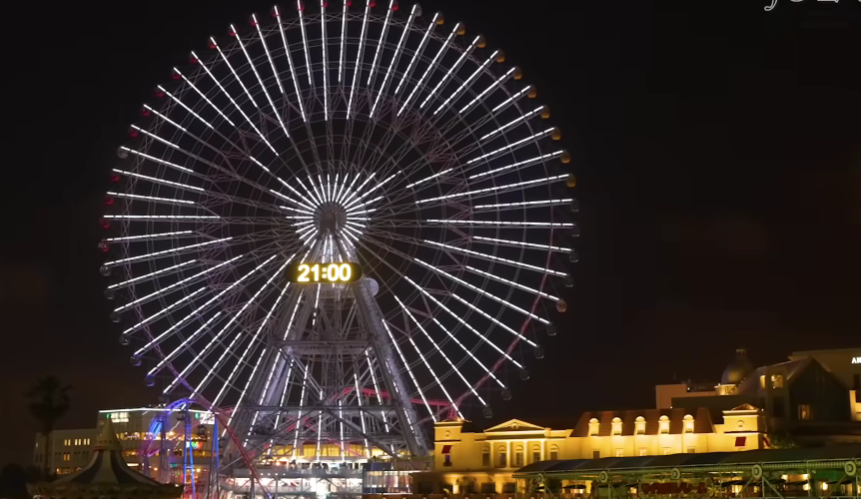
A StarFlyer plane with Seventeen livery (top) and the Yokohama Cosmo Clock 21 lit up with Seventeen's logo.

For promotion, Seventeen hosted events in each of the cities. Events included stamp rallies throughout Japan, a river cruise along the Han River in Seoul DJ'd by frequent Seventeen collaborator Bumzu, and a hotel collaboration in Bangkok. In Japan, a collaboration was arranged with StarFlyer to adapt the livery to a photo of the group on all routes within Japan. The purpose of the project across the cities, titled "Seventeen the City", was to transform the feel of the concerts to a large-scale festival, giving the fans more to do than attend the concert and go home. Airport transfers and local shuttles to concerts were also offered to ease the impact of more remote venues. For the culmination of the tour, Seventeen officially collaborated with the Yokohama Government to arrange for events held at the city hall, seaside mall, and an evening firework display at the port.

An exhibition titled "Follow Fellow" was held in Incheon, Yokohama, Bangkok and Jakarta. The exhibition featured pictorials from the tour, behind the scenes information and outfits worn by the members throughout the tour.

== Reception ==
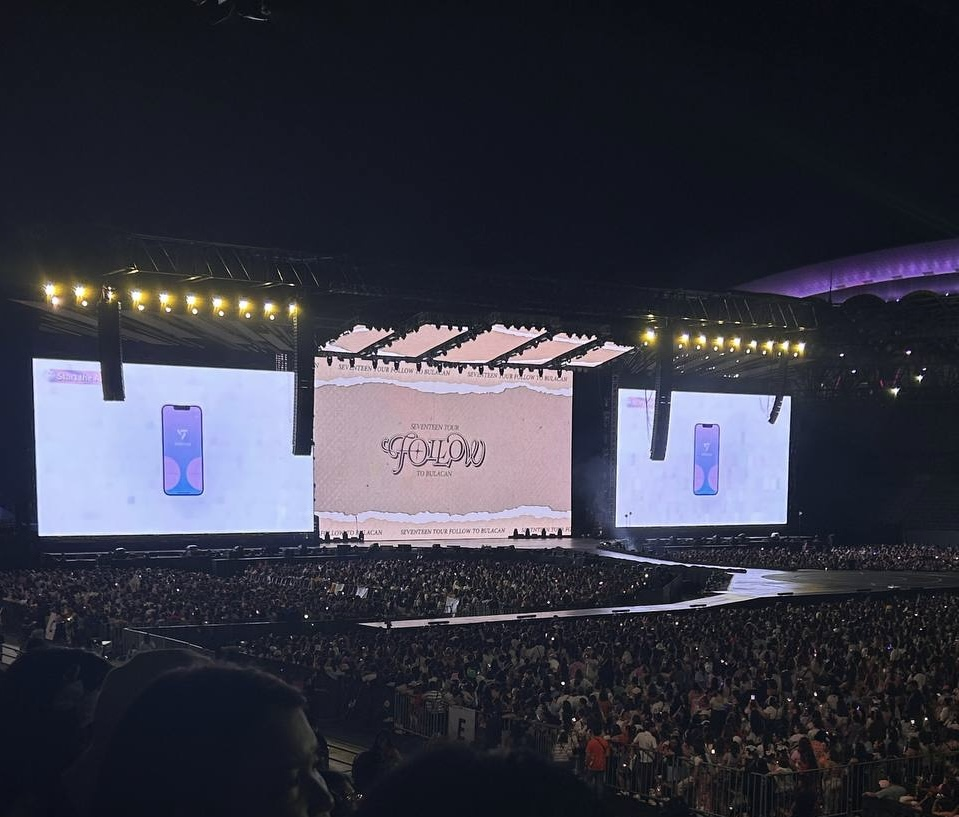
The stage in Bulacan, Philippines

In a review for The Korea Herald, Choi Ji-won referred to the concert as "nothing short of a full-blown extravaganza". Gabriel Saulog of Billboard Philippines wrote that the tour's Bulacan stops had "palpable" energy, crediting the group's "remarkable talent, showmanship, and entertaining prowess", alongside their connection with their fans, for creating an atmosphere of fond memories.

Reviews for the encore performances were also favourable. Billboard's Jeff Benjamin described the two-day concerts in Seoul as "electrifying", especially noting that the five-piece live band elevated the performances, and that the live premiere of the new songs from 17 Is Right Here made the tour's Korean finale more momentous. Pyo Kyung-min reviewed the encore concert in Yokohama for The Korea Times, describing it as a "hotbed of excitement" amongst fans and an "unwavering energy" from the group throughout the three and a half hour performance.

== Film ==
On July 16, 2024, Seventeen announced that they would be releasing the concert film Seventeen Tour Follow Again To Cinemas. The film, which covered the group's two-day encore concert at the Seoul World Cup Stadium on April 27 and 28, was captured using 360-degree cameras and cinematic cameras to present a full view of the performances. Partnering with local cinema chain CGV for an exclusive release, Seventeen premiered the film on August 14. A limited run for domestic and international screenings, with the latter handled by Trafalgar Releasing, began on August 21.

== Set list ==
The following set list is from the first shows in Seoul, South Korea. It is not intended to represent all shows from the tour.

Act I

1. "Super"
2. "Don Quixote"
3. "Clap"
4. "Don't Wanna Cry"
5. "F*ck My Life"
6. "Thanks"

Act II – Unit stages

7. "Dust" (Vocal Team)
8. "Pinwheel" (Vocal Team)
9. "Highlight" (Performance Team)
10. "I Don't Understand But I Luv U" (Performance Team)
11. "Back It Up" (Hip Hop Team)
12. "Fire" (Hip Hop Team)

Act III – Follow Festival

13. "Home;Run"
14. "Left & Right"
15. "Beautiful"
16. "Adore U"
17. "April Shower"
18. "Kidult"

Act IV

19. "Anyone"
20. "Good To Me"
21. "Hot"

Act V – Encore

22. "Run To You"
23. "To You"
24. "Campfire" (by fans)
25. "Hit"
26. "Very Nice"

== Tour dates ==
Key
‡	Indicates performances streamed simultaneously on Weverse Concerts
†	Indicates performances streamed simultaneously or delayed in cinemas

Concert dates
Date	City	Country	Venue	Attendance	Revenue	Ref.
July 21, 2023 ‡	Seoul	South Korea	Gocheok Sky Dome	123,141	$12,974,978	
July 22, 2023 ‡	Seoul	South Korea	Gocheok Sky Dome	123,141	$12,974,978	
September 6, 2023	Tokyo	Japan	Tokyo Dome	123,141	$12,974,978	
September 7, 2023	Tokyo	Japan	Tokyo Dome	123,141	$12,974,978	
November 23, 2023	Saitama	Japan	Belluna Dome	496,000	$61,600,000	
November 24, 2023	Saitama	Japan	Belluna Dome	496,000	$61,600,000	
November 30, 2023	Nagoya	Japan	Vantelin Dome Nagoya	496,000	$61,600,000	
December 2, 2023	Nagoya	Japan	Vantelin Dome Nagoya	496,000	$61,600,000	
December 3, 2023 ‡	Nagoya	Japan	Vantelin Dome Nagoya	496,000	$61,600,000	
December 7, 2023	Osaka	Japan	Kyocera Dome Osaka	496,000	$61,600,000	
December 9, 2023	Osaka	Japan	Kyocera Dome Osaka	496,000	$61,600,000	
December 10, 2023	Osaka	Japan	Kyocera Dome Osaka	496,000	$61,600,000	
December 16, 2023 †	Fukuoka	Japan	Fukuoka PayPay Dome	496,000	$61,600,000	
December 17, 2023 ‡	Fukuoka	Japan	Fukuoka PayPay Dome	496,000	$61,600,000	
December 23, 2023	Bangkok	Thailand	Rajamangala National Stadium	496,000	$61,600,000	
December 24, 2023	Bangkok	Thailand	Rajamangala National Stadium	496,000	$61,600,000	
January 13, 2024	Bocaue	Philippines	Philippine Sports Stadium	496,000	$61,600,000	
January 14, 2024	Bocaue	Philippines	Philippine Sports Stadium	496,000	$61,600,000	
January 20, 2024	Macau	China	Macau Olympic Complex Stadium	496,000	$61,600,000	
January 21, 2024	Macau	China	Macau Olympic Complex Stadium	496,000	$61,600,000	
March 30, 2024 ‡	Incheon	South Korea	Incheon Asiad Main Stadium	56,000	$5,900,000	
March 31, 2024 ‡	Incheon	South Korea	Incheon Asiad Main Stadium	56,000	$5,900,000	
April 27, 2024	Seoul	South Korea	Seoul World Cup Stadium	70,000	$7,100,000	
April 28, 2024	Seoul	South Korea	Seoul World Cup Stadium	70,000	$7,100,000	
May 18, 2024	Osaka	Japan	Nagai Stadium	101,000	$10,100,000	
May 19, 2024 ‡	Osaka	Japan	Nagai Stadium	101,000	$10,100,000	
May 25, 2024	Yokohama	Japan	Nissan Stadium	142,000	$13,700,000	
May 26, 2024 ‡	Yokohama	Japan	Nissan Stadium	142,000	$13,700,000	
Total				988,141	$111,374,978	

== See also ==
- Seventeen discography
- List of Seventeen live performances
