= Philippine Sports Stadium =

Football and track stadium in the Philippines

- The stadium in 2026
- Interactive map of Philippine Sports Stadium
- Location: Ciudad de Victoria, Bocaue, Bulacan, Philippines (Note: Ciudad de Victoria spans over an area administered by two municipalities, Santa Maria and Bocaue. However according to mapping websites, the stadium itself is located within the boundary of Bocaue.)
- Coordinates: 14°47′41″N 120°57′2″E
- Owner: Iglesia ni Cristo
- Operator: Maligaya Development Corporation
- Capacity: 25,000 (seated)
- Surface: Grass
- Acreage: 3 hectares (7.4 acres)

Construction
- Groundbreaking: August 17, 2011
- Opened: July 21, 2014
- Architect: Phildipphil
- Project managers: Iglesia ni Cristo; New San Jose Builders; Generation Design Asia
- Structural engineer: Phildipphil
- Main contractor: Phildipphil

Tenants
- Philippines national football team (2014–); University of the Philippines track and field team

The Philippine Sports Stadium, also known as Iglesia ni Cristo Stadium, is a football and track stadium at Ciudad de Victoria, a 140-hectare (350-acre) tourism enterprise zone in the towns of Bocaue and Santa Maria, Bulacan, Philippines. The stadium was built right next to the Philippine Arena, the world's largest indoor arena. It is one of the largest football stadiums in the Philippines with a maximum seating capacity of 25,000. Its seating capacity is about twice the seating capacity of the Rizal Memorial Stadium which has a capacity of 12,873.

PWP Landscape Architecture is responsible for the landscaping work on the area around the stadium known as the Stadium Gardens.

Since December 2016, the track and field team of the University of the Philippines Diliman has been a tenant of the stadium.

== Sporting events ==
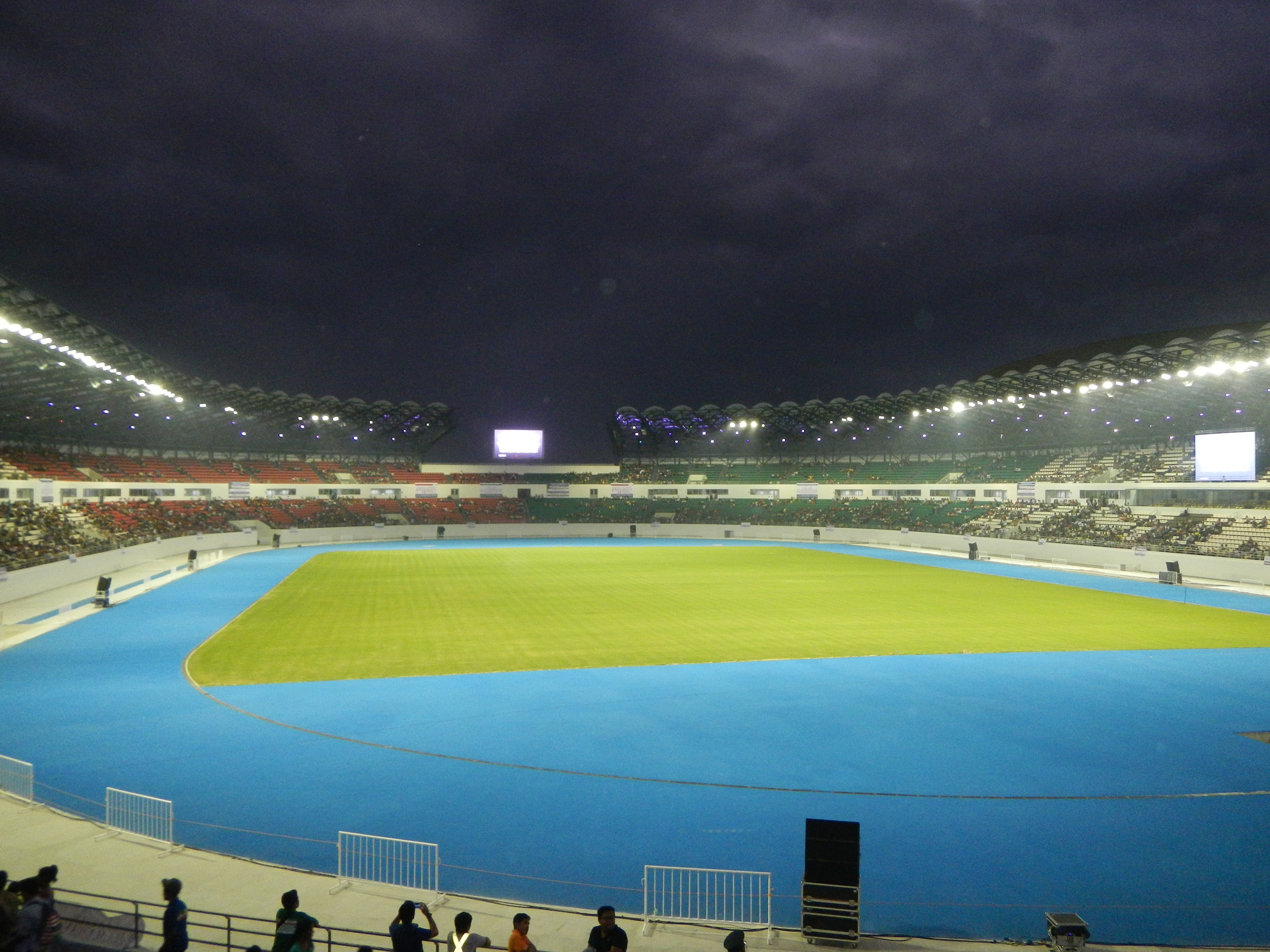
Stadium interior

=== Football ===
==== Club ====
The first football match and major sporting event to be held at the Philippine Sports Stadium was between clubs Global and Yadanarbon on April 15, 2015. About 2,000 people attended the match. The Philippine-based Global defeated Yadanarbon of Myanmar, 4–1, in a group stage match at the 2015 AFC Cup. Mark Hartmann was the first football player to score a goal at the stadium, scoring at the 16th minute from a penalty kick. Yan Paing was the first foreigner and football player from a foreign-based club to score a goal at the stadium, scoring the lone goal for his team at the 19th minute.

==== International ====
The first full international game held in the stadium was between the Philippines and Bahrain which took place on June 11, 2015 as part of the second round of the 2018 FIFA World Cup qualifiers. The Philippines defeated Bahrain 2–1 with Misagh Bahadoran scoring his first international goal in the 50th minute which is also the first goal made for a national team side at the stadium. Javier Patiño was the other scorer for the Philippine side scoring 10 minutes later after Bahadoran's goal. Abdulwahab Al Malood scored a consolation goal for Bahrain in 3 minutes into extra time, becoming the first goalscorer for a foreign national team side. The match was attended by about 6,000 people.

=== Rugby union ===
The first rugby tournament held in the stadium was the 2015 Asian Rugby Championship Division 1 tournament, which hosted the teams of Kazakhstan, Sri Lanka, Singapore and the Philippines on May 6 and 9, 2015. The first rugby match was a match between Singapore and the Philippines held on May 6, with the hosts winning the match in extra time with the scoreline of 20–17. The Philippines later lost to Sri Lanka in the finals with the scoreline of 14–27.

== Other events ==
The stadium has also been used for concerts and non-sporting events. Along with the Philippine Arena, the Philippine Sports Stadium was used as a venue for the Iglesia ni Cristo's centennial celebration event held on July 27, 2014 with the stadium filled with 20,000 people during the rites. The stadium also held concerts of local artists as part of the 2015 New Year's Countdown event. K-pop group Seventeen was the first overall act to headline a concert at the Philippine Sports Stadium, with their two-night stop as part of their Follow Tour in January 2024, followed by NCT 127 with their one-night concert the week after, also part of their world tour. Seventeen returned to the stadium the following two years for their Right Here World Tour and New_ World Tour. In May 2026, rock band Cup of Joe became the first solo Filipino act to headline the stadium when they performed there for their Sandali: The Cup of Joe Fest concert. In March 2027, BTS is expected to perform at the stadium for three nights as part of their comeback world tour, becoming the first artist to perform for three nights in one tour at the stadium.

Concerts held at the Philippine Sports Stadium
Date	Artist	Event	Attendance	Revenue
2024
January 13	Seventeen	Follow Tour	54,035 / 54,035	$11,641,788
January 14	Seventeen	Follow Tour	54,035 / 54,035	$11,641,788
January 21	NCT 127	Neo City – The Unity		
2025
January 18	Seventeen	Right Here World Tour	57,634 / 57,634	$12,807,169
January 19	Seventeen	Right Here World Tour	57,634 / 57,634	$12,807,169
March 1	Enhypen	Walk the Line Tour	19,482 / 19,482	$4,221,469
2026
March 21	Seventeen	New_ World Tour		
May 23	Cup of Joe	Sandali: The Cup of Joe Fest		
2027
March 13	BTS	Arirang World Tour		
March 14	BTS	Arirang World Tour		
March 16	BTS	Arirang World Tour		

== See also ==
- List of football stadiums in the Philippines
- New Clark City Athletics Stadium
- Biñan Football Stadium
- Panaad Stadium
- PFF National Training Center
