= Maestro (Seventeen song) =

- Orchestra remix cover

Single by Seventeen

from the album 17 Is Right Here
- Language: Korean
- Released: April 29, 2024
- Genre: K-pop · Dance · R&B
- Length: 3:18
- Label: Pledis
- Composers: Woozi; Bumzu; Ninos Hanna; Andreas Oberg; Gabriel Brandes; Justin Starling; Maya Rose; Niklas Jarelius Persson; William Segerdahl; Yeom Dong-geon
- Lyricists: Woozi; Bumzu

Seventeen singles chronology
"God of Music" (2023)	"Maestro" (2024)	"Love, Money, Fame" (2024)

Music video
- "Maestro" on YouTube

"Maestro" is a song recorded by South Korean boy band Seventeen. It was released on April 29, 2024, as the lead single from the compilation album 17 Is Right Here. It debuted at number one on the Circle Digital Chart.

== Background and release ==
After having initially teased new content on their Follow Tour encore concerts in Incheon, Seventeen officially announced the release of 17 is Right Here, a compilation album that would encompass their nine-year career, on April 2, 2024. On April 18, the album revealed a 33-song tracklist, which included the band's greatest hits, as well as four new songs: "Spell", "Cheers to Youth", "Lalali", and the lead single "Maestro".

"Maestro" premiered at Seventeen's encore concerts at the Seoul World Cup Stadium on April 27 and 28. The song and its accompanying music video were officially released on April 29, 2024.

On May 2, Seventeen announced an orchestral remix of the song, to be released the following day. It was released on May 3, alongside a previously unreleased instrumental version of the original track.

== Composition ==
"Maestro" was described as a dance R&B track that pulls various elements from Seventeen's previous hits, such as "Very Nice", "Oh My!", "Fear", "Rock with You", "Cheers", and "Super". By incorporating these elements, the song aimed to convey the message of the past continuing to be a source of inspiration for the group as they evolve.

The song was composed by Woozi, Bumzu, Ninos Hanna, Andreas Öberg, Gabriel Brandes, Justin Starling, Maya Rose, Niklas Jarelius Persson, William Segerdahl, and Yeom Dong-gun; its lyrics were written by Woozi and Bumzu.

== Music video ==
The music video was released on April 29, 2024, at 6 p.m. KST. In an effort to question the use of artificial intelligence (AI) in music and art, the cyberpunk-themed music video, which features Seventeen performing in technology-heavy sets and fighting against robots, was intentionally partially created using AI, showcasing the band's thoughts and fears of a modern world where "everything is created through AI and new technologies".

The music video was partly filmed at Kwangwoon University's Cultural Centre, which hosted both Seventeen's first fan meeting in 2015 and their showcase for the 17 Is Right Here album in May 2024.

== Commercial performance ==
"Maestro" debuted at number one on South Korea's Circle Digital Chart, as recorded on the chart dated April 28 – May 5, 2024. The song also entered the World Digital Song Sales weekly chart at number five on the chart dated May 11.

== Critical reception ==
Professional ratings
Review scores
Source	Rating
Rolling Stone India	4/5 stars

Cristina Jaleru of the Associated Press lauded "Maestro" as "a playful R&B tune intertwined with an engaging EDM hook", further calling it a "perfect encapsulation of the band's past sound with present inclinations". In a four-star review for Rolling Stone India, Debashree Dutta praised Seventeen for their "seamless harmony [which] creates a luminous soundscape in conjunction that showcases their musical expertise and virtuosity", noting that the song "builds in passion and profundity as solid rap, vocals, and performance take center stage".

== Accolades ==
On South Korean music programs, "Maestro" won six first place awards.

Music program awards for "Maestro"
Program	Date	Ref.
M Countdown	May 9, 2024	
M Countdown	May 16, 2024	
Music Bank	May 10, 2024	
Music Bank	May 17, 2024	
Show Champion	May 8, 2024	
Show! Music Core	May 11, 2024	

== Track listing ==
- Digital download and streaming – Orchestra Remix
1. "Maestro" – 3:18
2. "Maestro" (Orchestra Remix) – 3:38
3. "Maestro" (Inst.) – 3:18

== Charts ==
=== Weekly charts ===
Weekly chart performance for "Maestro"
Chart (2024)	Peak position
Global 200 (Billboard)	50
Hong Kong (Billboard)	17
Japan Hot 100 (Billboard)	17
Japan Combined Singles (Oricon)	16
Malaysia (Billboard)	13
Malaysia International (RIM)	10
New Zealand Hot Singles (RMNZ)	18
Singapore (RIAS)	14
South Korea (Circle)	1
Taiwan (Billboard)	5
UK Singles Downloads (Official Charts)	23
UK Singles Sales (OCC)	26
US World Digital Song Sales (Billboard)	5

=== Monthly charts ===
Monthly chart performance for "Maestro"
Chart (2024)	Position
South Korea (Circle)	16

=== Year-end charts ===
Year-end chart performance for "Maestro"
Chart (2024)	Position
South Korea (Circle)	99

== Release history ==
Release history for "Maestro"
Region	Date	Format	Version	Label	Ref.
Various	April 29, 2024	Digital download; streaming	Original	Pledis; YG Plus	
Various	May 3, 2024	Digital download; streaming	Orchestra Remix	Pledis; YG Plus	
