= Love, Money, Fame =

- Remixes cover

Single by Seventeen featuring DJ Khaled

from the EP Spill the Feels
- Language: Korean; English
- Released: October 14, 2024
- Genre: K-pop; R&B; hip hop
- Length: 3:18
- Label: Pledis
- Composers: Woozi; Bumzu; DJ Khaled; Rudi Daouk; Jakob Mihoubi; Carlyle Fernandes; Charli Taft; Daniel 'Obi' Klein; Park Ki-tae
- Lyricists: Woozi; Bumzu; Vernon; Robb Roy
- Producers: Woozi; Bumzu; DJ Khaled

Seventeen singles chronology
"Maestro" (2024)	"Love, Money, Fame" (2024)	"Shohikigen" (2024)

DJ Khaled singles chronology
"Paradise" (2024)	"Love, Money, Fame" (2024)	"Higher Love" (2025)

Music video
- "Love, Money, Fame" on YouTube

"Love, Money, Fame" is a song recorded by the South Korean band Seventeen featuring American music producer DJ Khaled. It was released on October 14, 2024, as the lead single from their thirteenth extended play Spill the Feels. The song debuted at number one on the Circle Digital Chart, becoming their third chart topper in South Korea.

== Background and release ==
In August 2024, Pledis Entertainment announced that Seventeen would be releasing a new Korean language EP in the October of that year, alongside an announcement for the Right Here World Tour. The EP Spill the Feels was announced for release on October 14.

In September, Seventeen members Woozi, Mingyu, and Vernon flew to Miami, US, to meet with American music producer DJ Khaled. A collaboration was teased at on October 1 and officially announced as the album's lead single on October 3.

== Composition ==
"Love, Money, Fame" has been described as having a groovy melody reminiscent of R&B and hip-hop, boosted by harmoniously arranged vocals.

The song was composed by Woozi, Bumzu, DJ Khaled, Rudi Daouk, Jakob Mihoubi, Carlyle Fernandes, Charli Taft, Daniel 'Obi' Klein, and Park Ki-tae; its lyrics were written by Woozi, Bumzu, Vernon, and Robb Roy.

== Music video ==
The music video was released on October 14, concurrently with the album. It was directed by 725 of Sl8ight Visual Lab. The video features the group handling various crises such as plane crashes and armed robbery, due to having the power of love. The core message of the music video echoes lyrics of the song, which state "everyone wants love, money, and fame, but I only want you."

The set of the music video was recreated in a partnership with Airbnb, allowing fans to immerse themselves in the video for one night.

== Accolades ==
During the song's promotional period on South Korean music programs, "Love, Money, Fame" achieved three first-place wins. The track was listed as one of the best global collaborations in 2024 by Rolling Stone Korea, having been described as a "powerful anthem" and the year's "best party track that swept the hot stages".

Music Program Wins for "Love, Money, Fame"
Program	Date	Ref.
Music Bank	October 25, 2024	
Show Champion	October 23, 2024	
Show! Music Core	October 26, 2024	

== Track listing ==
- Digital download and streaming – Remixes
1. "Love, Money, Fame" (featuring DJ Khaled) – 3:06
2. "Love, Money, Fame" (English version; featuring DJ Khaled) – 3:06
3. "Love, Money, Fame" (sped up version) – 2:29
4. "Love, Money, Fame" (Hitchhiker Remix) – 3:03
5. "Love, Money, Fame" (TAK Remix) – 3:03
- Digital download and streaming – Timbaland Remix
1. "Love, Money, Fame" (featuring DJ Khaled) – 3:06
2. "Love, Money, Fame" (Timbaland Remix; featuring DJ Khaled) – 3:13
- Digital download and streaming – Kenia Os Remix
1. "Love, Money, Fame" (featuring DJ Khaled) – 3:06
2. "Love, Money, Fame" (Kenia Os Remix; featuring DJ Khaled) – 3:34

== Charts ==
=== Weekly charts ===
Weekly chart performance for "Love, Money, Fame"
Chart (2024)	Peak position
Global 200 (Billboard)	50
Hong Kong (Billboard)	18
Japan (Japan Hot 100)	24
Japan Combined Singles (Oricon)	24
Malaysia (Billboard)	11
Malaysia International (RIM)	10
New Zealand Hot Singles (RMNZ)	39
Philippines (Philippines Hot 100)	11
Singapore (RIAS)	13
South Korea (Circle)	1
Taiwan (Billboard)	5
UK Singles Downloads (Official Charts)	54
UK Singles Sales (OCC)	59
US World Digital Song Sales (Billboard)	4

=== Monthly charts ===
Monthly chart performance for "Love, Money, Fame"
Chart (2024)	Peak position
South Korea (Circle)	13

== Release history ==
Release history for "Love, Money, Fame"
Region	Date	Format	Version	Label	Ref.
Various	October 14, 2024	Digital download; streaming	Original	Pledis; YG Plus	
Various	October 18, 2024	Digital download; streaming	Remixes	Pledis; YG Plus	
Italy	November 1, 2024	Radio airplay	Original	Universal	
Various	November 1, 2024	Digital download; Streaming	Timbaland Remix	Pledis	
Various	November 8, 2024	Digital download; Streaming	Kenia Os Remix	Pledis	
