= Always Yours (album) =

2023 compilation album by Seventeen

- Digital cover

Compilation album by Seventeen
- Released: August 23, 2023
- Recorded: 2018–2023
- Length: 87:39
- Languages: Japanese; English
- Labels: Pledis Japan; Hybe Labels Japan

Seventeen chronology
FML (2023)	Always Yours (2023)	Seventeenth Heaven (2023)

Singles from Always Yours
- 1. "Ima (Even If the World Ends Tomorrow)" Released: August 23, 2023

Always Yours is the first Japanese compilation album by the South Korean boy band Seventeen, released on August 23, 2023. The album features all the group's Japanese songs from 2018–2023, alongside two new tracks, which include the lead single "Ima (Even If the World Ends Tomorrow)".

Upon release, the album charted at number one on Japan's Oricon and Billboard weekly charts, as well as at number five on both of their year-end charts.

== Background ==
Seventeen made their debut in Japan in May 2018 with "Call Call Call!". Since then, the group has consistently released music and performed at concert tours across the country every year, with the most recent being their two-night concerts held in Kyocera Dome and Tokyo Dome for the Love fan meeting event in May 2023. On June 22, Seventeen announced the title of the forthcoming Japanese album via X (formerly Twitter), revealing that the album would be a compilation album slated for release in August.

== Promotion ==
Seventeen appeared on Japanese television to promote the album, including performances on Count Down TV and NHK's NHK Music Expo 2023. In December, Seventeen performed "Ima (Even if the World Ends Tomorrow)" at the annual FNS Music Festival.

Seventeen collaborated with Club Dam, a karaoke company, to feature the songs of the album from September 10 to September 30.

Following the release of the album in August, Seventeen embarked on the Japanese leg of their Follow Tour in September at Tokyo Dome, with more shows in November and December for a total of twelve performances in five cities.

== Track listing ==
CD1
No.	Title	Lyrics	Music	Arrangement	Length
1.	"Ima (Even If the World Ends Tomorrow)" (今 -明日 世界が終わっても-)	Woozi; Bumzu; barbora (Note: Credited for Japanese lyrics)	Woozi; Bumzu; Hwang Hyun (Monotree)	Bumzu; Hwang	3:12
2.	"Sara Sara"	Woozi; Bumzu; barbora	Woozi; Bumzu; Ohway!	Bumzu; Ohway!	2:58
3.	"Call Call Call!" (from We Make You, 2018)	Woozi; Bumzu; Yu Shimoji	Woozi; Bumzu; Park Ki-tae	Bumzu; Park	3:20
4.	"Happy Ending" (from Happy Ending, 2019)	Woozi; Bumzu; Haru Robinson	Woozi; Bumzu	Bumzu; Anchor	3:30
5.	"Fallin' Flower" (舞い落ちる花びら; from Fallin' Flower, 2020)	Woozi; Bumzu; Dino; Robinson	Woozi; Bumzu; Park	Bumzu; Park	3:31
6.	"24H" (from 24H, 2020)	Woozi; Bumzu; Robinson	Woozi; Bumzu; Park	Park	3:09
7.	"Not Alone" (ひとりじゃない; from Not Alone, 2020)	Woozi; Bumzu; Robinson	Woozi; Bumzu; Park	Park	3:19
8.	"Power of Love" (あいのちから; from Power of Love, 2021)	Woozi; Bumzu; barbora	Woozi; Bumzu; Nmore	Nmore	3:50
9.	"Dream" (from Dream, 2022)	Woozi; Bumzu; barbora	Woozi; Bumzu; Lee Beomhun	Bumzu; Lee Beomhun	3:07
Total length:					29:56

CD2
No.	Title	Lyrics	Music	Arrangement	Length
1.	"Highlight (Note: Performed by the Performance Team.)" (Japanese version; from We Make You, 2018)	Bumzu; Hoshi; Dino; Jun; The8; Lee Yujeong; Y.A	Bumzu; Hoshi	Bumzu	3:07
2.	"Lean on Me (Note: Performed by the Hip Hop Team.)" (Japanese version; from We Make You, 2018)	S.Coups; Wonwoo; Mingyu; Vernon; Y.A	Bumzu	Bumzu	3:07
3.	"20 (Note: Performed by the Vocal Team.)" (Japanese version; from We Make You, 2018)	Woozi; Y.A	Woozi; Won Young-heon; Noh Hyun	Won; Noh	3:27
4.	"Love Letter" (Japanese version; from We Make You, 2019)	Woozi; S.Coups; Wonwoo; Mingyu; Vernon; Y.A	Woozi; Won; Noh	Won; Noh; Choi Minsik	3:12
5.	"Oh My!" (Japanese version; from Happy Ending, 2016)	Woozi; Bumzu; S.Coups; Vernon; Robinson	Woozi; Bumzu	Bumzu; Park	3:26
6.	"Healing" (Japanese version; from We Make You, 2019)	Woozi; S.Coups; Mingyu; Vernon; Dino; Robinson; Y.A	Woozi; Won; Noh	Won; Noh	3:23
7.	"Good to Me" (Japanese version; from Fallin' Flower, 2020)	Woozi; Bumzu; Robinson	Woozi; Bumzu	Bumzu; Park	2:47
8.	"Smile Flower" (Japanese version; from Fallin' Flower, 2020)	Woozi; Robinson	Woozi; Won; Noh; Yama Art	Won; Noh; Art	3:33
9.	"Pinwheel" (Japanese version; from 24H, 2020)	Woozi; barbora	Woozi; Noh; Won	Noh; Won	3:15
10.	"247" (Japanese Version, from 24H, 2020)	Woozi; Bumzu; The8; Hoshi; Dino; Robinson	Woozi; Bumzu; Park	Bumzu; Park	3:23
11.	"Chilli" (Japanese version; from 24H, 2020)	S.Coups; Vernon; Mingyu; Wonwoo; Robinson	Vernon; Bumzu; Poptime	Poptime	2:55
12.	"Together" (Japanese version; from 24H, 2020)	Woozi; Bumzu; S.Coups; Hoshi; Mingyu; barbora	Woozi; Bumzu; Park	Bumzu; Park; Nmore	3:21
13.	"Run to You" (Japanese version; from Not Alone, 2020)	Woozi; Bumzu; barbora	Woozi; Bumzu; Park	Bumzu; Park	3:04
14.	"Home;run" (Japanese version; from Not Alone, 2020)	Woozi; Bumzu; Vernon; Seungkwan; Robinson	Woozi; Bumzu; Nmore	Bumzu; Nmore	3:06
15.	"Home" (Japanese version; from Power of Love, 2021)	Woozi; Bumzu; Robinson	Woozi; Bumzu; Seungkwan	Bumzu; Park	3:00
16.	"Snap Shoot" (Japanese version; from Power of Love, 2021)	Woozi; Bumzu; Vernon; S.Coups; Mingyu; barbora	Woozi; Bumzu	Bumzu; Ohway!	3:17
17.	"Rock with You" (Japanese version; from Dream, 2022)	Woozi; Bumzu; Vernon; Joshua; Kim In-hyeong; Jordan Witzigreuter; Cameron Walker; Tim Tan; barbora	Woozi; Bumzu; Josh McClelland; Matt Terry; Witzigreuter; Walker; Tim Tan		2:58
18.	"All My Love" (Japanese version; from Dream, 2022)	Woozi; Bumzu; Seungkwan; Vernon; barbora	Woozi; Bumzu; Park	Bumzu; Park	3:22
Total length:					57:43

== Charts ==
=== Weekly charts ===
Weekly chart performance
Chart (2023)	Peak position
Japanese Albums (Oricon)	1
Japanese Combined Albums (Oricon)	1
Japanese Hot Albums (Billboard Japan)	1
Portuguese Albums (AFP)	37
UK Physical Albums (OCC)	95
US Top Album Sales (Billboard)	16
US World Albums (Billboard)	4

=== Monthly charts ===
Monthly chart performance
Chart (2023)	Peak position
Japanese Albums (Oricon)	1

=== Year-end charts ===
Year-end chart performance
Chart (2023)	Position
Japanese Albums (Oricon)	5
Japanese Combined Albums (Oricon)	5
Japanese Hot Albums (Billboard Japan)	5

Year-end chart performance
Chart (2024)	Position
Japanese Albums (Oricon)	58

== Certifications ==
Certifications
Region	Certification	Certified units/sales
Japan (RIAJ)	Million	1,000,000^{^}
^{^} Shipments figures based on certification alone.
