= Spill the Feels =

- Digital cover

EP by Seventeen
- Released: October 14, 2024
- Genre: K-pop
- Length: 17:35
- Language: Korean; English
- Label: Pledis

Seventeen chronology
17 Is Right Here (2024)	Spill the Feels (2024)	Happy Burstday (2025)

Singles from Spill the Feels
- 1. "Love, Money, Fame" Released: October 14, 2024

Spill the Feels is the thirteenth Korean extended play (EP) and sixteenth overall by South Korean boy band Seventeen. It was released on October 14, 2024, by Pledis Entertainment through YG Plus. The EP's lead single, "Love, Money, Fame", was released on the same day and features American music producer DJ Khaled. Both the album and its lead single topped South Korea's respective Circle Charts.

== Background and release ==
In August 2024, Pledis Entertainment announced that Seventeen would be releasing a new Korean language EP in the October of that year, alongside an announcement for the Right Here World Tour. On August 12, the label then announced that members Jeonghan and Jun would not be participating in the tour or the EP promotions, due to Jeonghan's military enlistment and Jun's acting career in China, although both members had participated in the production of the EP.

On September 13, the group revealed the first teaser for the EP, featuring a "spooky" clip of a train in a dark subway station. The EP's title was revealed on September 16, an anagram for "I felt helpless", text featured in the initial teaser post. The next day, Seventeen revealed a trailer for the record, featuring the group's members in various locations, alongside words and phrases hinting at the content of the EP. On September 19, the group revealed the release schedule for the rollout, which revealed that the record would have two music videos, a Going Seventeen special episode, and a pop-up street event in Seoul.

On September 30, Seventeen released music samples for each of the songs on the album, revealing that the EP would be six songs in length. On October 1, the group began teasing a collaboration with American music producer DJ Khaled on the album. The full track list was revealed on October 3.

== Promotion ==
In January 2025, Seventeen collaborated with Casetify to create a tech case and accessories collection inspired by their album Spill the Feels, showcasing original designs that "radiate messages of love, honesty and encouragement".

== Critical reception ==
Professional ratings
Review scores
Source	Rating
Clash	8/10
NME	4/5 stars

In a positive review, Clash's Isabella Wandermurem commended Spill the Feels for its musical maturity, as well as its skillful balance of bold experimentation, traditional K-pop, and heartfelt lyrics. Rhian Daly of NME scored the album four out of five stars, praising it for presenting a "multidimensional fresh look" on Seventeen's career, with the record also serving as "an unwavering commitment to spreading hope, joy, and love, all via addictive and affecting music".

== Commercial performance ==
On September 30, 2024, Pledis Entertainment confirmed that the EP had surpassed 3 million preorders in just two weeks. Spill the Feels debuted at number one on the Circle Album Chart upon its first week of release. In the United States, it debuted at number five on the Billboard 200 with 64,000 units sold.

== Track listing ==
Spill the Feels track listing
No.	Title	Lyrics	Music	Arrangement	Length
1.	"Eyes on You"	Woozi; Bumzu; S.Coups; Vernon	Woozi; Bumzu; Shift K3Y		2:55
2.	"Love, Money, Fame" (featuring DJ Khaled)	Woozi; Bumzu; Vernon; Robb Roy	Woozi (Note: Also credited as producer); Bumzu; DJ Khaled; Rudi Daouk; Jakob Mihoubi; Carlyle Fernandes; Charli Taft; Daniel 'Obi' Klein; Park Ki-tae		3:06
3.	"1 to 13"	Woozi; Bumzu	Woozi; Bumzu; Park; Benjmn; Andreas Öberg; Christoffer Jonsson		2:37
4.	"Candy" (사탕; Vocal Team)	Woozi; Bumzu	Woozi; Bumzu; Lee Beom-hun	Bumzu; Lee	3:04
5.	"Rain" (Performance Team)	Woozi; Bumzu; Hoshi; Dino	Woozi; Bumzu	Bumzu; Park; Ohway!	3:21
6.	"Water" (Hip Hop Team)	Vernon; S.Coups; Wonwoo; Mingyu; Bumzu	Bumzu; Vernon; Mingyu	Bumzu	2:32
Total length:					17:35

== Charts ==
=== Weekly charts ===
Weekly chart performance for Spill the Feels
Chart (2024)	Peak position
Austrian Albums (Ö3 Austria)	4
Belgian Albums (Ultratop Flanders)	54
Belgian Albums (Ultratop Wallonia)	20
Croatian International Albums (HDU)	8
French Albums (SNEP)	18
German Albums (Offizielle Top 100)	14
Greek Albums (IFPI)	13
Hungarian Albums (MAHASZ)	33
Italian Albums (FIMI)	90
Japanese Albums (Oricon)	1
Japanese Combined Albums (Oricon)	1
Japanese Hot Albums (Billboard Japan)	1
South Korean Albums (Circle)	1
Swiss Albums (Schweizer Hitparade)	23
UK Album Downloads (OCC)	20
US Billboard 200	5
US World Albums (Billboard)	1

=== Monthly charts ===
Monthly chart performance for Spill the Feels
Chart (2024)	Peak position
Japanese Albums (Oricon)	2
South Korean Albums (Circle)	1

=== Year-end charts ===
2024 year-end chart performance for Spill the Feels
Chart (2024)	Position
Global Albums (IFPI)	6
Japanese Albums (Oricon)	5
Japanese Combined Albums (Oricon)	5
Japanese Hot Albums (Billboard Japan)	5
South Korean Albums (Circle)	1

2025 year-end chart performance for Spill the Feels
Chart (2025)	Position
Japanese Albums (Oricon)	57
Japanese Top Albums Sales (Billboard Japan)	54
US World Albums (Billboard)	13

== Certifications ==
Certifications for Spill the Feels
Region	Certification	Certified units/sales
Japan (RIAJ)	Platinum	250,000^{^}
South Korea (KMCA) Standard	3× Million	3,000,000^{^}
South Korea (KMCA) Weverse Albums version	Platinum	250,000^{^}
South Korea (KMCA) KiT	Platinum	250,000^{^}
^{^} Shipments figures based on certification alone.

== Release history ==
Release history for Spill the Feels
Region	Date	Format	Label
Various	October 14, 2024	Digital download; streaming	Pledis; YG Plus
South Korea	October 14, 2024	CD	Pledis; YG Plus
Japan	October 15, 2024	CD	Pledis
United States	October 18, 2024	CD	Pledis; YG Plus
