= Seventeenth Heaven =

- A.M. 5:26 version and digital cover

EP by Seventeen
- Released: October 23, 2023
- Genre: K-pop
- Length: 26:45
- Languages: Korean; English
- Label: Pledis
- Producers: Woozi; Bumzu

Seventeen chronology
Always Yours (2023)	Seventeenth Heaven (2023)	17 Is Right Here (2024)

Singles from Seventeenth Heaven
- 1. "God of Music" Released: October 23, 2023

Seventeenth Heaven is the twelfth Korean extended play (EP) and fifteenth overall by South Korean boy band Seventeen. It was released on October 23, 2023, by Pledis Entertainment through YG Plus, five months following the release of FML (2023). Produced by Woozi and Bumzu, the eight-track EP is a primarily upbeat record, serving as a celebration of the band's career thus far. It is led by the single "God of Music", and includes a collaboration with the American producer Marshmello titled "SOS".

Commercially, the EP became the most pre-ordered release in South Korean history, with 5.20 million pre-orders.

== Background ==
On April 24, 2023, Seventeen released their tenth EP, FML, which became the second most pre-ordered release in South Korean history prior to its release. Due to their busy schedules, the band began preparations for their next mini album, Seventeenth Heaven, while promoting FML.

Amid promotions for FML, member Seungkwan went on hiatus, though he resumed activities in time for their next release. In support of the EP, the band continued on their Follow Tour, starting the Japanese leg at the Tokyo Dome on September 8.

== Music and lyrics ==
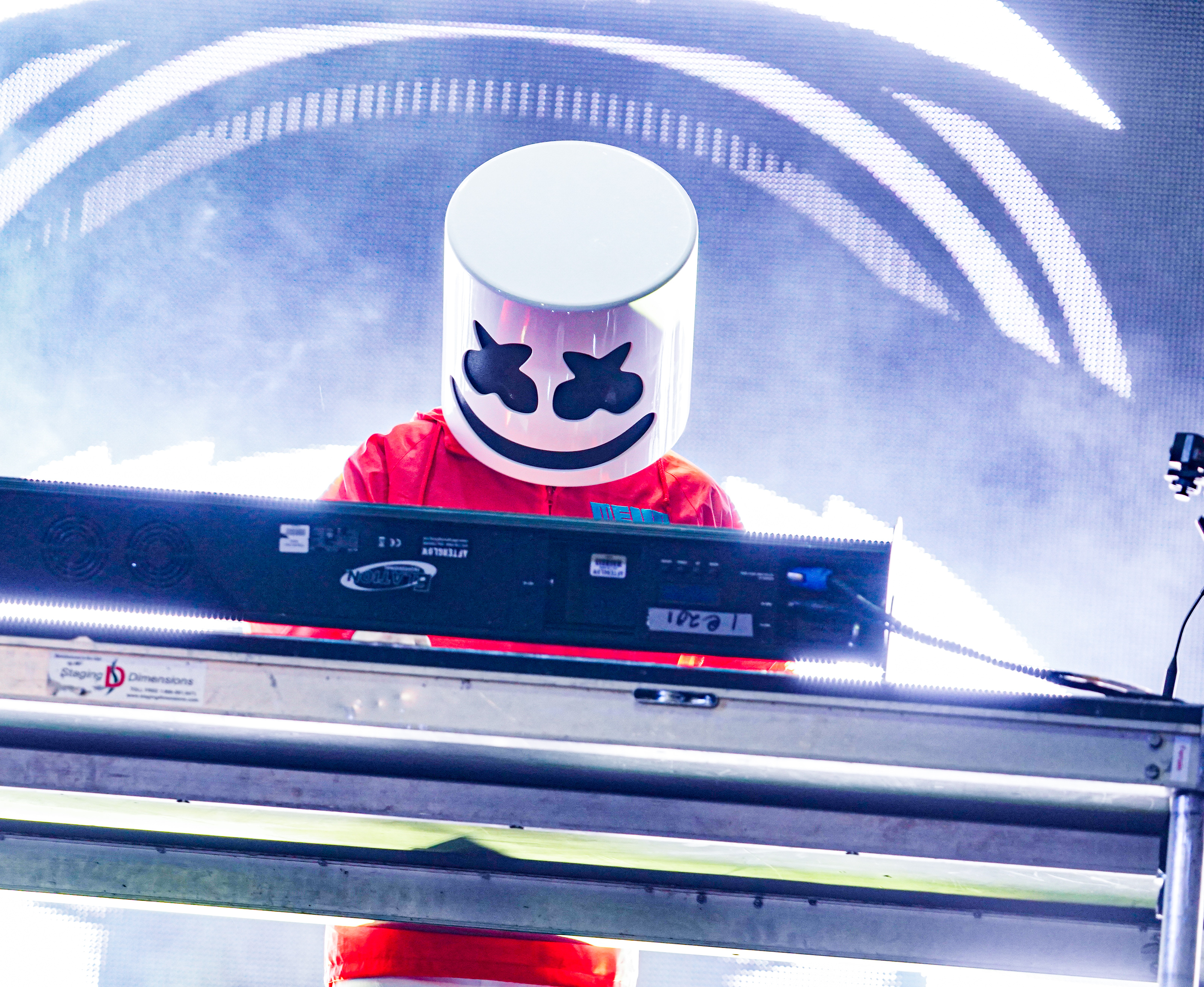
Marshmello served as a producer on the opening track "SOS".

Seventeenth Heaven comprises eight tracks and has a runtime of 26 minutes and 45 seconds. Woozi and Bumzu spearheaded the production of the EP, while members S.Coups, Mingyu, Vernon, Wonwoo and Hoshi participated in writing the tracks for the release. American DJ and producer Marshmello served as a producer to the opening track "SOS".

Contrasting with its predecessor FML, the EP expresses an unabashed, joyous celebration of the band's career. Several songs in the release have been described by Billboard as having an "upbeat production".

=== Songs ===
The EP opens with the English-language track "SOS", which exhibits "hints of rock" and Jersey club influences. The upbeat soul funk track, "God of Music", serves as the release's lead single, which has been described as being "colorful sounding". "Diamond Days" samples "Shining Diamond" from their debut EP 17 Carat (2015). As is with previous releases, the EP features three "unit" songs. "Back 2 Back" is an EDM track performed by the group's performance unit laced with a retro, video game theme. "Monster" is performed by the group's hip-hop unit. The piano-led ballad "Yawn" is performed by the group's vocal unit. The EP closes with the track "Headliner", which serves as a song of gratitude to the band's following.

== Release and promotion ==
The group announced the release on their social media on September 18, 2023, and made it available for preorder two days later. An accompanying teaser clip shows a red festival wristband with the album title and release date. On October 16, Seventeen revealed the tracklist for the record. However, on October 19, Pledis Entertainment announced that leader S.Coups would refrain from participating in the promotions for the EP, focusing on his recovery following a knee injury; as a result, his appearance in the "God of Music" music video was filmed separately from the other members.

In the run-up to the EP's release, Seventeen organized pop-up street events throughout South Korea. For the events, the band collaborated with local restaurants and installed "art walls" with works inspired by the band. The group also released a series of trailers titled "SVT Right Here" featuring footage of Seoul, Tokyo, Paris, New York City, and Beijing shrouded in balloons resembling chamomile flowers, hinting the centers of promotion for the album. However, a teaser for the album depicting the Great Wall of China drew flak from Chinese audiences, citing cultural insensitivity, resulting in its removal and an apology from the agency.

=== Title and artwork ===
The EP's title is derived from the English term "seventh heaven," which is defined as "the state of extreme joy". The physical version of the EP was released in three different variants: the AM 5:26 version depicts the start of an imaginative festival at dawn; the PM 2:14 version sees the festival in full swing; and the PM 10:23 version presents the festival finale. Each version constitutes a unique design and includes posters, lyric books and picture cards.

=== Follow Tour ===
In promotion of the album, the group added shows to their Follow Tour, with shows to be staged in Japan, Thailand, the Philippines, and Macao, extending the tour's run to January 2024.

== Critical reception ==
Professional ratings
Review scores
Source	Rating
NME	4/5 stars

In a mixed review, NME critic Abby Webster noted that while the EP had the potential to match their previous works, the vocal processing set a "firm ceiling for the mini-album's greatness". However, Webster complimented the EP for continuing "to flex their consistency and creativity as a collective". Maria Sherman from The Associated Press praised the album for involving Seventeen members in its composition and lyrics, describing it as "a release that feels remarkably true to them: a celebration of their success, and the motivation to push harder in the future".

=== Accolades ===
Awards and nominations for "Seventeenth Heaven"
Award ceremony	Year	Category	Result	Ref.
Circle Chart Music Awards	2024	Artist of the Year – Album	Won	

== Commercial performance ==
By October 12, Seventeenth Heaven had amassed 4.67 million stock pre-orders, surpassing the record of 4.64 million pre-orders with their previous album FML. It became the most pre-ordered release in history, with 5.20 million pre-orders, breaking the record of 5.13 million set in May 2023 by Stray Kids' 5-Star.

According to the International Federation of the Phonographic Industry (IFPI)'s Global Music Report for 2023, Seventeenth Heaven was the fourth most-consumed album across all formats, and the eighth best-selling album worldwide, having sold 4.5 million units. (Note: The IFPI Global Albums chart ranks, in order, the albums that generated the most money globally across streaming, download, and physical record sales (combined) in a calendar year. The Global Album Sales Chart measures global unit sales across all physical formats, as well as full album downloads.)

== Track listing ==
Seventeenth Heaven track listing
No.	Title	Lyrics	Music	Arrangement	Length
1.	"SOS"	Woozi; Bumzu; Shannon	Woozi; Bumzu; Marshmello		3:12
2.	"God of Music" (음악의신)	Woozi; Bumzu; S.Coups; Mingyu; Vernon	Woozi; Bumzu; Park Ki Tae	Bumzu; Park; Lee Beom Hun	3:25
3.	"Diamond Days"	Woozi; Bumzu; S.Coups; Vernon; Jeon Gan Dhi	Woozi; Bumzu; MasterKey	Bumzu	3:26
4.	"Back 2 Back" (Performance Team)	Woozi; Bumzu; Hoshi	Woozi; Bumzu; Tak	Bumzu; Tak	3:10
5.	"Monster" (Hiphop Team)	Woozi; Bumzu; S.Coups; Wonwoo; Mingyu; Vernon	Bumzu; Vernon	Bumzu	2:39
6.	"Yawn" (하품; Vocal Team)	Woozi	Woozi; Bumzu	Woozi; Bumzu; Lee	4:18
7.	"Headliner"	Woozi; Bumzu	Woozi; Bumzu	Bumzu	3:10
8.	"God of Music" (음악의신; instrumental version)		Woozi; Bumzu	Bumzu; Park	3:25
Total length:					26:45

== Charts ==
=== Weekly charts ===
Weekly chart performance for Seventeenth Heaven
Chart (2023 - 2024)	Peak position
Austrian Albums (Ö3 Austria)	13
Belgian Albums (Ultratop Flanders)	40
Belgian Albums (Ultratop Wallonia)	18
Croatian International Albums (HDU)	38
French Albums (SNEP)	5
German Albums (Offizielle Top 100)	10
Hungarian Albums (MAHASZ)	25
Italian Albums (FIMI)	74
Japanese Albums (Oricon)	1
Japanese Combined Albums (Oricon)	1
Japanese Hot Albums (Billboard Japan)	1
New Zealand Albums (RMNZ)	38
Polish Albums (ZPAV)	34
South Korean Albums (Circle)	1
Spanish Albums (Promusicae)	62
Swiss Albums (Schweizer Hitparade)	15
UK Album Downloads (Official Charts)	51
US Billboard 200	2
US World Albums (Billboard)	1

=== Monthly charts ===
Monthly chart performance for Seventeenth Heaven
Chart (2023)	Position
Japanese Albums (Oricon)	1
South Korean Albums (Circle)	1

=== Year-end charts ===
2023 year-end chart performance for Seventeenth Heaven
Chart (2023)	Position
Global Albums (IFPI)	8
Japanese Albums (Oricon)	7
Japanese Combined Albums (Oricon)	7
Japanese Hot Albums (Billboard Japan)	7
South Korean Albums (Circle)	3

2024 year-end chart performance for Seventeenth Heaven
Chart (2024)	Position
Japanese Albums (Oricon)	13
South Korean Albums (Circle)	77
US World Albums (Billboard)	13

== Sales and certifications ==
Sales and certifications for Seventeenth Heaven
Region	Certification	Certified units/sales
Japan (RIAJ)	Million	1,000,000^{^}
South Korea (KMCA)	5× Million	5,000,000^{^}
South Korea (KMCA) Weverse version	2× Platinum	500,000^{^}
South Korea (KMCA) KiT version	Platinum	250,000^{^}
United States	—	98,000
Summaries
Worldwide (IFPI)	—	4,500,000
^{^} Shipments figures based on certification alone.

== Release history ==
Release dates and formats for Seventeenth Heaven
Region	Date	Format	Label
Various	October 23, 2023	CD; digital download; streaming	Pledis; YG Plus

== See also ==
- List of best-selling albums in South Korea
