= William Segerdahl =

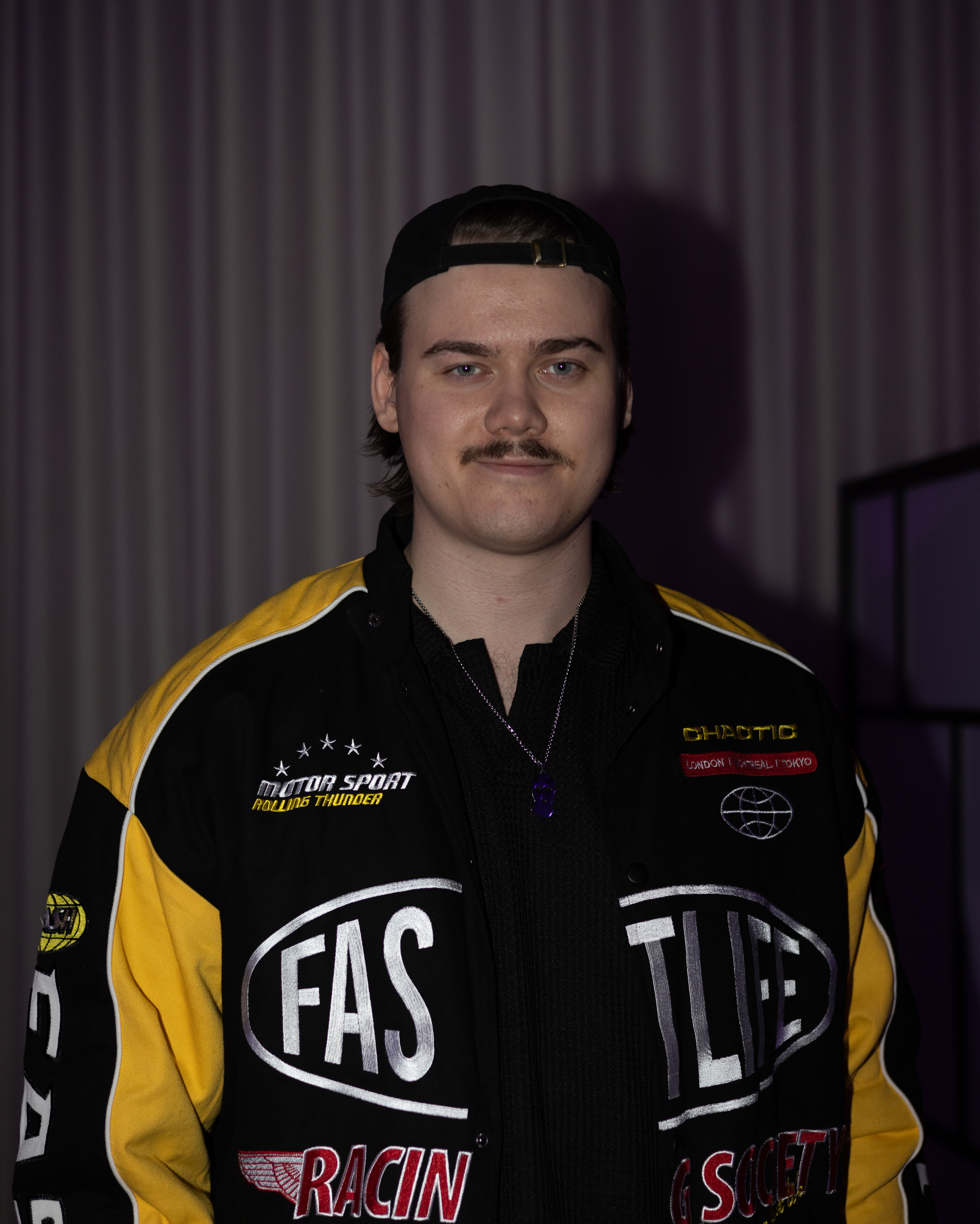

Background information
- Also known as: Wiljam
- Born: William Samuel Segerdahl; 10 June 2002 (age 24); Vänersborg, Sweden
- Genres: Pop
- Instrument: Vocals

William Samuel Segerdahl (born 10 June 2002) is a Swedish singer and songwriter. He participated in Idol 2018 which was broadcast on TV4. He placed in shared third place with Bragi Bergsson in the series semifinal on 30 November 2018. In 2017, Segerdahl released the songs "U-Turn" and "Trying". Since his participation in Idol, Segerdahl has released a handful of singles: "Problem", "Dansgolv", "Tåg", and "Ingenting Jag Säger Hjälper Nu", all of which were released during 2019. "Problem" reached number 3 on the Swedish Heatseeker Chart. In 2020, he has as of 29 April, released the singles "Det Kanske Inte är Så Farligt?" and "Aldrig".

== Discography ==
=== Singles ===
Adapted from Spotify.

Title	Year	Peak chart positions	Album
Title	Year	SWE	Album
"U-Turn"	2017	—	Non-album single
"Trying"	2017	—	Non-album single
"Problem"	2019	— (Note: While "Problem" didn't enter the Swedish Singles Chart, it peaked at number 3 on the Swedish Heatseeker Chart.)	Non-album single
"Tåg"	2019	—	Non-album single
"Dansgolv"	2019	—	Non-album single
"Ingenting jag säger hjälper nu" (Note: Cover of Elton John's song "Sorry Seems to Be the Hardest Word".)	2019	—	Non-album single
"Det kanske inte är så farligt?"	2020	—	Non-album single
"Aldrig"	2020	—	Non-album single
"Fri"	2020	—	Non-album single
"Stanna kvar hos mig"	2020	—	Non-album single
"Used to Be Love" (with John de Sohn)	2020	— (Note: "Used to Be Love" did not enter the Swedish Singles Chart, but peaked at number 16 on the Swedish Heatseeker chart.)	Non-album single
"Blyga pojkar"	2020	—	Non-album single
"Utan mig" (with Malin Christin)	2021	—	Non-album single
