= Gabriel Brandes =

Swedish songwriter and singer

- Born: Erik Gabriel Henrik Brunell Brandes
- Genres: K-pop; J-pop; Pop
- Occupations: Songwriter; Singer
- Years active: 2009–present
- Labels: EKKO Music Rights

Erik Gabriel Henrik Brunell Brandes, known professionally as Gabriel Brandes, is a Swedish songwriter and singer.

In 2023, Brandes received a nomination for the "Breakthrough of the Year" award at the 20th edition of Musikförläggarnas Pris.

== Early life ==
In 2009, at the age of 17, Brandes competed in the sixth season of Idol. He reached top 30 and was a favourite of jury member Laila Bagge.

Later in 2011, he joined "The United", a boy band consisting of five members from five different European countries. Brandes served as a lead songwriter for the band's debut record. The band was active from 2011 to 2014.

== Discography ==
=== As artist ===
Year	Song	Artist(s)	Album
2017	"Started a Fire"	Gabriel Brandes	Non-album single
2018	"Tillsammans Är Vi Starka"	Gabriel Brandes	Non-album single

=== As featuring artist ===
Year	Song	Artist(s)	Album
2016	"My Time"	Will Prime	Non-album single

=== As songwriter ===
All credits are adapted from Korea Music Copyright Association unless stated otherwise.

Year	Song	Artist(s)	Album
2017	"Wake Me Up"	B.A.P	Rose
2018	"Dancing With The Devil"	유닛플러스	The Uni+ Final
2018	"My Story"	유닛레인저	The Uni+ B Step 1
2018	"Pathfinders"	Lee Hong Gi	Pathfinders
2018	"Reminisce"	Infinite	Top Seed
2018	"SnapShot"	IN2IT	Snapshot
2018	"浪漫の地球(ホシ)"	Exile	Star Of Wish
2019	"Bomb" (Korean and English Version)	AleXa	Bomb
2019	"Fireflies"	NCT Dream	The World Scout Foundation OST
2019	"Get Ready"	Verivery	Veri-Able
2019	"Infected"	Art Nation	Infected
2019	"Midnight in Norway"	Monoir ft. Ameline	Midnight in Norway
2020	"Bad Guy"	1the9	Turn Over
2020	"Break Your Rules"	The Boyz	Reveal
2020	"Chained Up"	Now United	Chained Up
2020	"Come on & Join Us"	Park Bo-gum	Blue Bird
2020	"Get Ready"	Ha Sung-woon	Twilight Zone
2020	"On Your Mind"	Alicia Moffet, Shaun Frank	On Your Mind
2020	"Photo"	Verivery	Face Me
2020	"永久No mission"	Gacharic Spin	Gold Dash
2021	"Atlantis"	SHINee	Atlantis - The 7th Album Repackage
2021	"Atlantis"	SHINee	Superstar
2021	"Attention, please!"	Enhypen	Dimension: Dilemma
2021	"0X1=LOVESONG (I Know I Love You) feat. Seori"	Tomorrow X Together	The Chaos Chapter: Fight Or Escape
2021	"0X1=LOVESONG (I Know I Love You) feat. Seori (Emocore Mix)"	Tomorrow X Together	The Chaos Chapter: Fight Or Escape
2021	"Dear Sputnik"	Tomorrow X Together	The Chaos Chapter: Fight Or Escape
2021	"MOA Diary (Dubaddu Wari Wari)"	Tomorrow X Together	The Chaos Chapter: Fight Or Escape
2021	"Dirty Dancing"	Michaela	Dirty Dancing
2021	"Secret Secret"	Stray Kids	Noeasy
2021	"Super Star"	EXIT	Genesis
2021	"Thrill Ride"	The Boyz	Thrill-ing
2022	"Blessed-Cursed"	Enhypen	Dimension: Answer
2022	"Celebrate"	Super Junior	The Road: Celebration - The 11th Album Vol.2
2022	"Clink Clink"	WSG Wannabe (OASISO)	WSG Wannabe 1st Album
2022	"Honey on me"	KAT-TUN	Honey(Selected Edition)
2022	"My Dear"	BoA	My Dear
2022	"Next to Me"	Maximus	Next to Me
2022	"Party Rock"	Cravity	New Wave
2022	"Red Carpet"	Apink	Horn
2022	"Shadow"	Seventeen	Face the Sun
2022	"Shadow"	Seventeen	SEVENTEEN 4th Album Repackage'Sector 17'
2022	"Stay Alive (Prod. SUGA of BTS)"	Jungkook	Stay Alive (Prod. SUGA of BTS)
2022	"Taste The Feeling"	Tempest	ON and ON
2022	"Thursday's Child Has Far To Go"	Tomorrow X Together	Minisode 2: Thursday's Child
2022	"Time After Time"	BoA, Wendy, Ningning	2022 Winter SMTOWN: SMCU Palace
2022	"Underwater"	Kwon Eun-bi	Lethality
2022	"Want me"	Victon	Chronograph
2023	"Fever"	Ghost9	Peak Time - 3Round <Originals Match>
2023	"1000 Miles"	The New Six	Boyhood
2023	"Good Day"	The New Six	Boyhood
2023	"Identity"	SHINee	Hard
2023	"Madness"	Moonbin & Sanha	Incense
2023	"MOODY"	Superkind	PlaySuperkind : Player Gauge 200
2023	"Nice & Slow"	Psychic Fever from Exile Tribe	Psychic File I
2023	"Rover"	Kai	Rover
2023	"Still on a journey"	Travis Japan	Moving Pieces - EP
2023	"Sunshower"	Epex	Growing Pains
2023	"Take Two"	BTS	Take Two
2023	"The Planet"	BTS	The Planet
2023	"Tic Tac"	8TURN	8TurnRise
2023	"In Bloom"	Zerobaseone	Youth in the Shade
2023	"Caution"	OWV	Jack Pot
2023	"Over The Rainbow"	Kim Se-jeong	Door
2023	"9 o'clock"	Cravity	Sun Seeker
2023	"Jukebox"	Evnne	Target: ME
2023	"Full Metal Jacket"	Epex	Can We Surrender?
2023	"Get It On" (Korean and English version)	Fantasy Boys	Potential
2023	"What are we"	Baekho, Park Ji-won	What are we
2023	"White Lie	NCT 127	Be There for Me
2025	"Love Echo"	Rescene	lip bomb
