= Warning =

Warning or The Warning may refer to:

== Signal ==
- Precautionary statement
- Warning sign
- Warning system

== Books ==
- A Warning (book), a 2019 book by an anonymous Trump administration official later identified as Miles Taylor
- Warnings (book), a 2017 book by Richard A. Clarke
- The Warning (novel), a 1998 Animorphs novel by K. A. Applegate
- Warning, a journal for which Indian anti-colonial activist and anti-fascist soldier Gopal Mukund Huddar once worked

== Films ==
- Warning (1946 film), a Czechoslovak film
- Warning (2013 film), an Indian Hindi thriller film
- Warning (2015 film), a Bangladeshi action comedy film
- Warning (2021 film), an American-Polish science fiction thriller film
- The Warning (1927 film), an American silent film
- The Warning (1928 film), a British silent film
- The Warning (1980 film), an Italian giallo film
- The Warning (2015 film), an American horror thriller film
- The Warning (2018 film), a Spanish thriller film
- A Warning (film), a 1953 Czechoslovak drama film
- The Warning, a 1915 film produced by Equitable Motion Picture Company
- Aagaah: The Warning, a 2011 Indian Hindi-language horror drama film

== Music ==
=== Artists ===
- Warning (French band), a 1980–1985 hard-rock band
- Warning (German band), a 1982–1983 electronic music band
- Warning (British band), a doom metal band
- The Warning (band), a Mexican hard rock band
- Wally Warning (died 2025), Aruban reggae musician and singer

=== Albums ===
- Warning (Antigama album), 2009
- Warning (Green Day album) or the title song (see below), 2000
- Warning (EP), by Sunmi, 2018
- The Warning (Hot Chip album) or the title song, 2006
- The Warning (Queensrÿche album) or the title song, 1984
- Warnings (album), an album by I Break Horses
- Warning, an album by R. Stevie Moore, 1988
- Warning, an EP by SS501, 2005
- The Warning, by Daysend, 2007

=== Songs and poems ===
- "Warning" (Green Day song), 2000
- "Warning" (Incubus song), 2002
- "Warning" (Sejeong song), 2021
- "The Warning" (Eminem song), 2009
- "Warning!", by Adeva from Adeva!, 1989
- "Warning", by the Aynsley Dunbar Retaliation, 1967
- "Warning", by A from 'A' vs. Monkey Kong
- "Warning!", by Band-Maid from Unseen World, 2021
- "Warning", by Fat Joe and Remy Ma from Plata O Plomo, 2017
- "Warning", by Morgan Wallen from Dangerous: The Double Album, 2021
- "Warning", by MC Cheung and Kaho Hung from Frenemy, 2022
- "Warning", by Nick Jonas from Nick Jonas, 2014
- "Warning", by the Notorious B.I.G. from Ready to Die, 1994
- "Warning", by Oneohtrix Point Never from Age Of, 2018
- "Warning", by Skindred from Union Black, 2011
- "The Warning", by Nine Inch Nails from Year Zero
- "A Warning", by Wallows from Model, 2024
- "Warning", a 1962 poem by Jenny Joseph

=== Concert tours ===
- Warning Tour by Hoshi X Woozi, 2025

== Television ==
- "The Warning" (Dynasty 1986)
- "The Warning" (Dynasty 1988)

== Other uses ==
- Mount Warning, New South Wales, Australia
- Warning (Australian horse) (born 2016), Australian Thoroughbred racehorse
- Warning (British horse) (1985–2000), British Thoroughbred racehorse

== See also ==
- Fair Warning (disambiguation)
- Warn (disambiguation)
- Warning label
- Warning signs of suicide
