= Warn (surname) =

Warn is a surname. Notable people with this surname include:

- Bob Warn (born 1945), American baseball coach and player
- Chris Warn (born 1979), English cricketer
- Emily Warn, American poet
- Holly Warn (born 2009), Australian Paralympic swimmer
- Jayden Warn (born 1994), Australian wheelchair rugby player
- Jesse Warn, American TV/film director and screenwriter
- Jim Warn (born 1983), American racing driver
- Julie Warn (born 1953), Australian performing arts administrator
- Patti Warn (born 1944), Australian trade unionist
- Sarah Warn, American writer

== See also ==
- Warn (disambiguation)
- Warne (disambiguation)
