= Commonwealth v. Twitchell =

Massachusetts criminal case

- Court: Supreme Judicial Court of Massachusetts
- Full case name: Commonwealth v. David R. Twitchell; Commonwealth v. Ginger Twitchell
- Decided: August 11, 1993
- Citations: 416 Mass. 114; 617 N.E.2d 609

Court membership
- Judges sitting: Paul J. Liacos, Herbert P. Wilkins, Ruth Abrams, Joseph R. Nolan, Neil L. Lynch, Francis Patrick O'Connor, John M. Greaney

Case opinions
- Decision by: Wilkins
- Dissent: Nolan

Commonwealth v. Twitchell, 416 Mass. 114, 617 N.E.2d 609 (1993), was the most prominent of a series of criminal cases, in the late 1980s and early 1990s, in which parents who were members of the Christian Science church were prosecuted for the deaths of children whose medical conditions had been treated only by Christian Science prayer.

== Manslaughter charges ==
In 1988, Massachusetts prosecutors charged David and Ginger Twitchell with manslaughter in the 1986 death of their two-year-old son Robyn. Robyn Twitchell died of a peritonitis caused by a bowel obstruction that medical professionals declared would have been easily correctable.

== Conviction ==
The Twitchells' defense contended that the couple were within their First Amendment rights to treat their son's illness with prayer and that Massachusetts had recognized this right in an exemption to the statute outlawing child neglect. They additionally contented that they relied on a legal opinion which stated their religious freedom allowed them to elect solely spiritual medical care. Regardless of whether this contention was true, they did not have an accurate understanding of the actual law.

The Twitchells were convicted of involuntary manslaughter. They were sentenced to ten years probation and required to bring their remaining children to regular visits to a pediatrician.

== Appeal, reversal, and remand for new trial ==
The conviction was overturned in 1993 by the Massachusetts Supreme Judicial Court and was remanded for a new trial.

Special circumstances in the case made a specific affirmative defense an option for the defendant-parents, specifically a reasonable belief "that they could rely on spiritual treatment without fear of criminal prosecution," and it was not asserted on their behalf. Since there were facts that a "reasonable jury" could have found supported this defense, the conviction was reversed and the case was remanded for new trial in order to prevent a miscarriage of justice. See Commonwealth v. Twitchell ("Evidence showed that the defendants were deeply motivated toward helping their child, while at the same time seeking to practice their religion within the limits of what they were advised that the law permitted. The issue of their reliance on advice that had origins in the Attorney General's opinion should have been before the jury. Therefore, the failure to present the affirmative defense to the jury, along with the relevant portion of the church's publication which the judge excluded, created a substantial risk of a miscarriage of justice requiring that we reverse the convictions, even in the absence of a request for jury instruction on the subject.").

Robert Gittens, speaking for the prosecutors' office commented, "the law is now clear: parents cannot sacrifice the lives of their children in the name of religious freedom." The court clearly stated that "The spiritual treatment provision protects against criminal charges of neglect and of wilfull failure to provide proper medical care and says nothing about protection against criminal charges based on wanton or reckless conduct. The fact that at some point in a given case a parent's conduct may lose the protection of the spiritual treatment provision and may become subject to the application of the common law of homicide is not a circumstance that presents a due process of law 'fair warning' violation." Although parents may defend against charges of neglect or willful failure to provide medical care on a religious basis, their religious decisions can not protect them from a homicide and/or involuntary manslaughter charge.

== The law today ==
As of 2026, the case has been cited many times in the Commonwealth and the core law has not changed. For example, the case was listed in a summation of examples of possible reckless and wanton conduct by the Supreme Judicial Court in Commonwealth v. Hardy, 482 Mass. 416 (2019). It has been clarified that the fact that parents made the choice does not by itself definitively prove manslaughter, but withholding medical care on religious grounds can properly be considered evidence of reckless or wanton conduct when an individual has been charged with involuntary manslaughter.
