= Not Alone (Seventeen song) =

2021 Japanese single by Seventeen

- Standard cover

Single by Seventeen

from the album Always Yours
- Language: Japanese
- Released: April 15, 2021 (digital); April 21, 2021 (physical)
- Genre: J-pop
- Length: 3:18
- Label: Pledis Japan
- Composers: Woozi; Bumzu; Park Ki-Tae
- Lyricists: Woozi; Bumzu; Haru.Robinson

Seventeen Japanese singles chronology
"24H" (2020)	"Not Alone" (2021)	"Power of Love" (2021)

Music video
- "Not Alone" on YouTube

"Not Alone" (Japanese: ひとりじゃない, Hepburn: Hitorijanai) is a song by South Korean boy group Seventeen. It was released as the group's third non-album and fifth overall Japanese single through Pledis Japan on April 21, 2021. The single debuted at number one on the Oricon Singles Chart, becoming the group's second consecutive chart-topper after "Fallin' Flower" in 2020.

== Background and release ==
In February 2021, Pledis Entertainment announced that Seventeen would be releasing their new Japanese single "Not Alone", following the success of the group's 2020 Japanese mini-album 24H and single "Fallin' Flower". The CD single, which includes "Not Alone" alongside the Japanese versions of the group's Korean tracks "Run To You" and "Home:Run", was marketed with six physical variations: Limited Edition A, Limited Edition B, and Limited Edition C, which each comes with a unique 36-page photo book; Limited Edition D, which comes with an M-Card; Regular Edition, which comes with a 16-page photo book; and Carat Edition, which features a special blu-ray.

"Not Alone" was digitally made available on music streaming platforms on April 15, 2021; its CD was physically released on April 21. A Korean version of the song was later released on Seventeen's greatest hits album 17 Is Right Here on April 29, 2024.

== Composition ==
Continuing the theme of youth set forth by the group's previous EPs Heng:garæ and Semicolon, "Not Alone" has been described to be a song that conveys the courage and determination of those standing at the starting line of their dreams. It has further been dubbed as a song of encouragement for those "spending their youth in the difficult times of the COVID-19 pandemic". Relatedly, the track, which conveys the message of being connected despite being apart, has also been noted to be an ode to Seventeen's fanbase, as well as a depiction of the group's yearning to meet them in person again, following the restrictions put into place on live performances by the pandemic.

The song was produced by Woozi, with Park Ki-Tae credited as an arranger and composer. Songwriting credits were provided to Bumzu and Woozi, while Japanese lyrics were credited to Haru.Robinson.

== Music video ==
The music video for "Not Alone" was released on April 18, 2021. It depicts the group's members scattered across various locations while staying remotely connected before reuniting during the video's climax. Commenting on the music video's theme, member DK shared, "There is a scene where the members, who were spending time in different places, connect via video call to celebrate my birthday. That scene left a particularly strong impression on me because it conveys the message that even though we were apart, we were not alone and were still connected."

== Promotion ==
On April 27, 2021, Seventeen hosted a special online fan meeting titled Hare to commemorate the single's release. A special performance of the song was aired on Asahi TV's weekly music program Music Station on May 7.

== Commercial performance ==
In Japan, "Not Alone" debuted at number one on the Billboard Japan Hot 100, selling 372,913 copies in its opening week of April 19–25, 2021. In the same period, it debuted at number one on the Oricon Singles Chart, recording 315,000 units sold. It is Seventeen's second consecutive Japanese work to top the chart, after their 2020 single "Fallin' Flower" sold 334,000 copies in its first week of release. This made Seventeen the second group in history to have two consecutive singles each exceed a first-week sales total of 300,000 units, after BTS, as well as the first foreign male artist to have three consecutive singles each exceed a first-week sales total of 200,000 units.

== Track listing ==
Not Alone track listing
No.	Title	Lyrics	Music	Arrangement	Length
1.	"Not Alone" (ひとりじゃない)	Woozi; Bumzu; Haru.Robinson	Woozi; Bumzu; Park Kitae	Park Kitae	3:18
2.	"Run To You" (Japanese version)	Woozi; Bumzu; Barbora	Woozi; Bumzu; Park Kitae	Bumzu; Park Kitae	3:14
3.	"Home;Run" (Japanese version)	Woozi; Bumzu; Vernon; Seungkwan	Woozi; Bumzu; Nmore	Bumzu; Nmore	3:04
Total length:					9:36

== Charts ==
=== Weekly charts ===
Weekly chart performance for "Not Alone"
Chart (2021)	Peak position
Japan (Japan Hot 100)	1
Japan Combined Singles (Oricon)	1
Japan Singles (Oricon)	1
US World Digital Song Sales (Billboard)	13

=== Monthly charts ===
Monthly chart performance for "Not Alone"
Chart (2021)	Peak position
Japan Singles (Oricon)	2

=== Year-end charts ===
Year-end chart performance for "Not Alone"
Chart (2021)	Peak position
Japan Singles (Oricon)	17

== Certifications ==
Certifications and sales for "Not Alone"
Region	Certification	Certified units/sales
Japan (RIAJ)	2× Platinum	500,000^{^}
^{^} Shipments figures based on certification alone.
