= Warne =

Warne may refer to:

- Warne (car), British 4-wheeled cyclecar made 1913–1915
- Warne Bubble Plane, a 1990s sporting aircraft
- Frederick Warne & Co, book publishers
- Warne (river), a river of Lower Saxony, Germany
- Warne, North Carolina, an unincorporated community of North Carolina, United States
- Warne, Victoria, a town in Victoria, Australia

== People with the surname ==
- Baz Warne (born 1964), English musician
- Bill Warne (1914–1945), Australian rules footballer
- Charles Warne (1802–1887), English antiquarian and archæologist
- Colston Warne, (1900–1987), professor of economics and one of the founders of Consumers Union
- Frank Warne (1906–1994), Australian cricketer
- Frank Julian Warne (1874–1948), American journalist, economist and statistician
- Frederick Warne (1825–1901), British publisher
- George Warne (organist) (1792–1868), English organist
- George Warne (1881–1928), British politician
- Helene Warne, British film editor who worked on American films during the 1920s and early 1930s
- H. Rus Warne (1872–1954), American architect
- Ivor Warne-Smith (1897–1960), Australian footballer
- Jim Warne (1879–1958), Australian rules footballer
- Jo Warne (fl. 1978–2000), British actress
- John Warne (born 1979), American musician
- Kate Warne (1833–1868), first female detective in the United States
- Katharine Mulky Warne (1923–2015), American composer, pianist and teacher
- Norman Warne (1868–1905), British publisher
- Paul Warne (born 1973), English soccer player
- Peter Warne (disambiguation)
- Ray Warne, English professional footballer who played for Ipswich Town between 1950 and 1951
- Shane Warne (1969–2022), Australian cricketer
- Shelby Logan Warne (born 1993), British music producer, musician, visual artist, frontwoman of the rock group KYROS
- Steve Warne (born 1984), English footballer
- Tom Warne (1870–1944), Australian cricketer
- Walter Warne (1898–1962), Australian politician

== See also ==
- Warn (disambiguation)
- Warnes (disambiguation)
