= Warning (Antigama album) =

Studio album by Antigama
- Released: 3 March 2009
- Recorded: 2008
- Genre: Grindcore, mathcore
- Length: 35:44
- Label: Relapse

Antigama chronology
Resonance (2007)	Warning (2009)	Stop the Chaos (2012)

Professional ratings
Review scores
Source	Rating
Allmusic	3.5/5 stars
Asice e-zine	3.5/5 stars
Metal Underground	3.5/5 stars

Warning is the fifth full-length studio album by Polish grindcore band Antigama. It was released on 3 March 2009 on Relapse Records.

== Overview ==
Warning was recorded in September 2008. A music video was released for "Disconnected". The music video was shot at the Progresja Club in Warsaw, Poland, with producer and director Bartek Rogalewicz. Shortly after the release, Antigama was part of the first European edition of Relapse Records' Contamination Tour alongside Origin, Skinless, Obscura, and Man Must Die.

== Track listing ==
1. "Disconnected" – 1:14
2. "Jealousy" – 1:33
3. "City" – 2:32
4. "Another" – 1:26
5. "Not True" – 1:12
6. "War" – 2:13
7. "Heartbeat" – 2:11
8. "Preachers Pray" – 2:17
9. "Sequenzia Dellamorte" – 1:32
10. "You Have The Right to Remain Violent" – 1:37
11. "Lost Skull" – 2:53
12. "Nightmare" – 2:50
13. "Paganini Meets Barbapapex" – 1:54
14. "Empty Room" – 2:15
15. "Orange Pills" – 1:04
16. "Black Planet" – 7:02

== Personnel ==
- Patryk Zwolinski – vocals
- Sebastian Rokicki – guitar
- Szymon Czech – bass
- Krzysztof Bentkowski – drums
