= Anima Morte =

Swedish rock band

- Origin: Sweden
- Genres: Progressive rock, Instrumental rock, Experimental rock
- Years active: 2004-present
- Labels: Transubstans, Dead Beat Media
- Members: Daniel Cannerfelt; Stefan Granberg; Fredrik Klingwall; Teddy Möller
- Website: animamorte.com

Anima Morte is an instrumental progressive rock band formed in Stockholm, Sweden 2004 by Fredrik Klingwall. Influenced by Goblin, Fabio Frizzi and other composers of the Italian giallo and zombie movies of the seventies and eighties. The group makes heavy use of authentic instruments from the era such as mellotron and analogue synthesizers.

The debut album Face the Sea of Darkness was released in 2007 on American label Dead Beat Media.

In May 2011 Swedish label Transubstans released the band's second album The Nightmare Becomes Reality which also entered the Swedish album chart Sverigetopplistan at number 17.

Anima Morte has also recorded various cover songs for the Colossus compilations released by French label Musea.

== Members ==
- Daniel Cannerfelt
- Stefan Granberg
- Fredrik Klingwall
- Teddy Möller

== Discography ==
=== Studio albums ===
- Face the Sea of Darkness (2007)
- The Nightmare Becomes Reality (2011)
- Upon Darkened Stains (2014)

=== Other releases ===
- Viva Morte! (2007) - EP
- Anima Morte / Hooded Menace (Split-EP with Hooded Menace) (2010)
- First Kill Under a Full Moon (Split-EP with Antigama) (2016)

=== Compilations ===
- Rökstenen - A Tribute To Swedish Progressive Rock Of The 70's (2009)
- The Tales of Edgar Allan Poe - A Synphonic Collection (2010)
- Cani Arrabbiati - "Opening Themes... A Tribute" (2010)
