= Seventeen (South Korean band) =

South Korean boy band

Seventeen 세븐틴
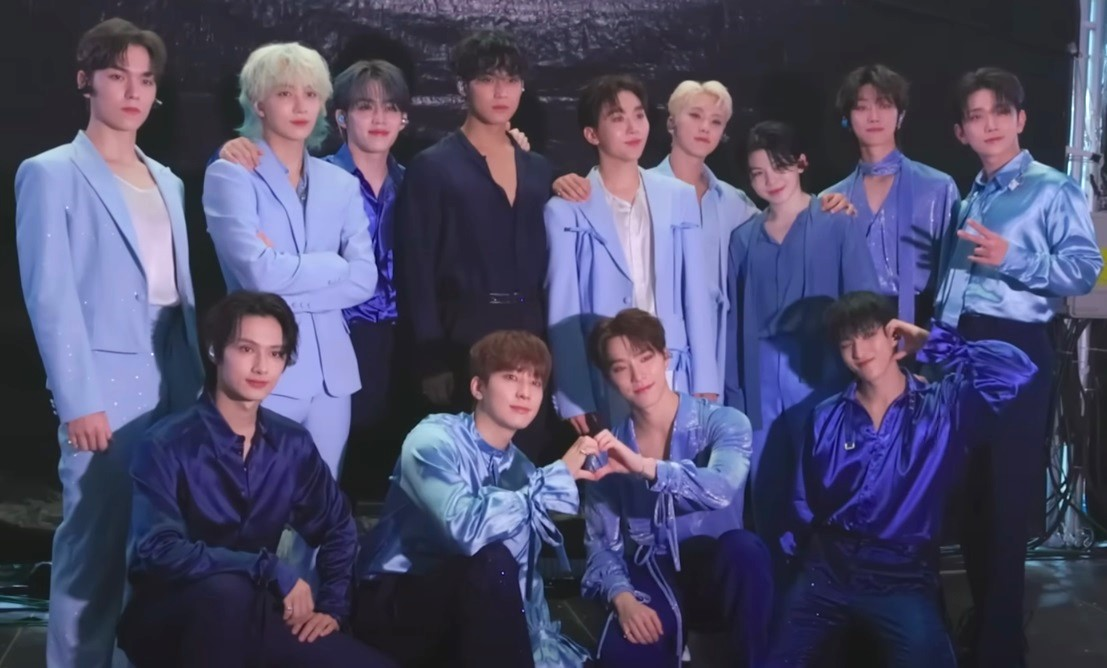
- Seventeen in 2024; Top, L–R: Vernon, Jeonghan, S.Coups, Mingyu, Seungkwan, Hoshi, Woozi, The8, Joshua; Bottom, L–R: Jun, Wonwoo, Dino, DK

Background information
- Origin: Seoul, South Korea
- Genre: K-pop
- Works: Discography; videography; live performances
- Years active: 2015–present
- Labels: Pledis; Geffen; Universal
- Spinoffs: BSS; JxW; HxW; CxM; DxS; V8; JxJ
- Members: S.Coups; Jeonghan; Joshua; Jun; Hoshi; Wonwoo; Woozi; DK; Mingyu; The8; Seungkwan; Vernon; Dino
- Website: pledis.co.kr/seventeen

Seventeen (Korean: 세븐틴; stylized in all caps or abbreviated as SVT) is a South Korean boy band. Formed by Pledis Entertainment, the group consists of thirteen members: S.Coups, Jeonghan, Joshua, Jun, Hoshi, Wonwoo, Woozi, DK, Mingyu, The8, Seungkwan, Vernon, and Dino. Seventeen is considered a "self-producing" idol group, with the members involved in songwriting, music production, and choreographing, among other aspects of their music and performances.

The group debuted on May 26, 2015, with the extended play (EP) 17 Carat, which became the longest-charting K-pop album of the year in the US and the only rookie album to appear on Billboard's "10 Best K-Pop Albums of 2015" list. They have since released five studio albums that have all peaked atop South Korea's Circle Album Chart, alongside several EPs in both Korean and Japanese. The group's 2023 EPs FML and Seventeenth Heaven both set records for the best-sold albums in history, with FML becoming the best selling album of 2023 according to the International Federation of the Phonographic Industry. Both records earned the group the MAMA Award for Album of the Year in the 2023 and 2024 ceremonies, respectively. Signature songs of the group include "Very Nice", "Super", and "Fallin' Flower".

They primarily perform as one group but are also divided into three units—hip-hop, vocal, and performance—each with a different area of specialization, and have also produced seven sub-units: BSS, JxW, HxW, CxM, DxS, V8 and JxJ. Throughout their career, they have collectively received renown for their concert tours and other live performances, to the extent of being labeled "Performance Kings", "K-pop Performance Powerhouse" and "Kings of Synchronization" by domestic and international media outlets.

== Name ==
The name Seventeen is derived from the expression “13 members + 3 teams + 1 group = 17”, representing how the 13 members are divided into three different teams and come together to form one cohesive group.The name originated from plans announced in April 2012 to debut a boy group consisting of 17 members with an average age of 17. It is often abbreviated to "SVT" by the group in marketing and events and by local and international media. The official name of Seventeen's fan club is "Carat" (Korean: 캐럿), as announced at a concert on February 14, 2016. Named after the measurement unit for diamonds, it is a reference to their debut EP 17 Carat and its opening song "Shining Diamond". Seventeen has a global fan club hosted via Weverse and a Japan-specific fan club.

== Background and formation ==
Woozi (pictured in 2015) was inspired to begin composing music following delays to Seventeen's debut.

In April 2012, Pledis Entertainment announced that it was preparing a boy group under the tentative name Seventeen. The group was envisioned as having 17 members with an average age of 17, and Pledis was considering dividing it into three units for activities in South Korea, China and Japan. The planned 2012 debut did not take place; by December 2012, news reports described Seventeen as preparing to debut in 2013. The company began releasing promotional videos for Seventeen TV and planned to broadcast the trainees' training process and daily lives through Ustream and later upload some parts on YouTube. Pledis stated through the group's official fan café that the trainees appearing in the program were not confirmed as final members and that the eventual lineup would be determined through further training and evaluation.

By November 2013, Seventeen was being reported as preparing for a debut in 2014, following earlier postponements. The fourth season of Seventeen TV concluded on November 19, 2013, followed by the third Like Seventeen concert on November 23 at Ilchi Art Hall in Seoul. The concert consisted of two performances attended by approximately 600 fans. After the fourth season, Seventeen TV went on an approximately eight-month hiatus before returning in July 2014.

Xu Minghao joined Pledis Entertainment around December 2013 and appeared in the fifth and final season of Seventeen TV, titled Last Seventeen TV, which began on July 11, 2014. S.Coups recalled that delays to the group's planned debut had inspired Lee Ji-hoon, who debuted under the stage name Woozi, to begin composing music, believing it might help Seventeen debut sooner. Woozi's initiative also inspired other members to learn songwriting and lyric writing. In August 2014, Seventeen was still being reported as preparing for a debut that year. The fifth season of Seventeen TV concluded with the fourth Like Seventeen concert on August 16 at Ilchi Art Hall in Seoul. Described as the group's final pre-debut concert and a final evaluation before debut, the show was set to feature performances from earlier concerts and a new song intended for a future album.

Han Sung-soo later explained that Pledis's small size influenced its pre-debut strategy for Seventeen. With few conventional ways to publicize a new group, the company used online broadcasts to allow fans to become familiar with the trainees before their debut. In February 2015, Seventeen was reported to have settled on a 13-member lineup, with plans to debut in April. Later that month, Seventeen appeared in a Lunar New Year special titled Hoshi and Seungkwan's Andromeda (호시, 승관의 안드로메다), streamed on AfreecaTV. Hosted by Hoshi and Seungkwan and featuring appearances by the other members, the pilot was described as an extension of Seventeen TV that allowed the group to communicate directly with fans. The program continued after Seventeen's debut and was noted for its informal format and focus on the members' individual personalities.

On April 29, 2015, Pledis publicly confirmed Seventeen's 13-member lineup and announced plans to introduce the group through the MBC Music reality program Seventeen Project: Debut Big Plan, which premiered on May 2. The original plan for 17 members had been reduced to 13 following the training process. Seungkwan later said that the pool of prospective members had at one point exceeded 30 before the final 13 were selected. Trainees came and went from the project throughout the years, and beyond the final thirteen members of the group also included Jang Do-yoon, Samuel Kim and Kim Min Gue. The members were reported to have spent an average of approximately four years as trainees together. At the group's debut press conference, S.Coups said that it had been difficult to repeatedly see reports describing their debut as imminent only for it to be postponed, but regarded the additional preparation as contributing to the formation of a more complete team.

The prolonged preparation period shaped the group's creative direction. Woozi recalled that Seventeen had initially been prepared under a conventional idol-group system before shifting toward self-production. Hoshi explained that the trainees began creating choreography for pop songs and making music themselves. He recalled that Pledis staff responded positively to their work, which helped shape the group's approach to self-production. Han later recalled that the members had demonstrated similar initiative during trainee evaluations, at one point bringing their own lighting equipment and electric fans to create stage effects. Han connected this approach directly to the decision to have Seventeen participate in self-production from their debut.

== History ==
=== 2015–2016: Debut with 17 Carat, and Love & Letter ===
Seventeen's official debut came at the end of Seventeen Project: Big Debut Plan with a live showcase on May 26 hosted by labelmates Lizzy and Raina. Three days later, Seventeen's first extended play (EP) 17 Carat was released digitally. 17 Carat became the longest-charting K-pop album of the year in the US and was the only rookie album to appear on Billboard's "10 Best K-pop Albums of 2015" list.

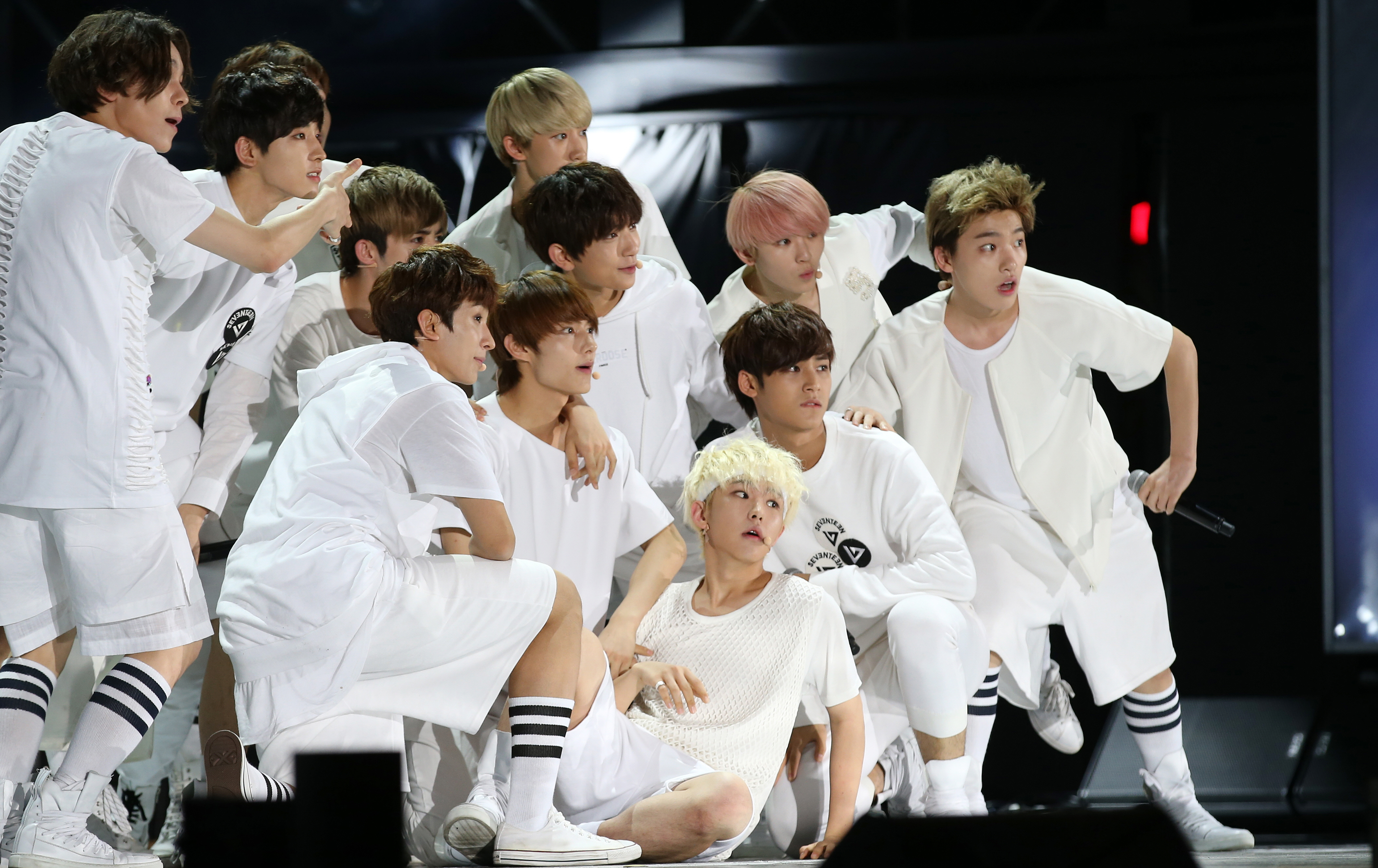
Seventeen performing at the 2015 Summer K-pop Festival at the Seoul Plaza

On September 10, Seventeen released their second EP Boys Be, which later became the highest-selling rookie album of the year. The EP's success earned the group awards at the Golden Disk Awards, Seoul Music Awards, and Gaon Chart K-pop Awards. Seventeen became the only K-pop group on Billboard's "21 Under 21 2015: Music's Hottest Young Stars" list. Seventeen held a four-show concert series in Seoul titled "Like Seventeen – Boys Wish" from December 24 to 26 as a year-end celebration. After the concerts' success, the group held two encore concerts in the following February.

Seventeen's first studio album Love & Letter was released on April 25, 2016. In addition to success on domestic charts, the album charted on the Oricon Weekly Pop Album Chart in Japan. Seventeen received their first win on a domestic music show with the album's lead single, "Pretty U". Love & Letter was later re-released on July 4 with the lead single "Very Nice". Promotions were immediately followed by their first concert tour, the Shining Diamonds Tour, which included venues in South Korea, Japan, Singapore, Indonesia, and Australia. On December 5, the group released their third EP, Going Seventeen with lead single "Boom Boom" (붐붐).

=== 2017–2020: Teen, Age, Japanese debut and An Ode ===
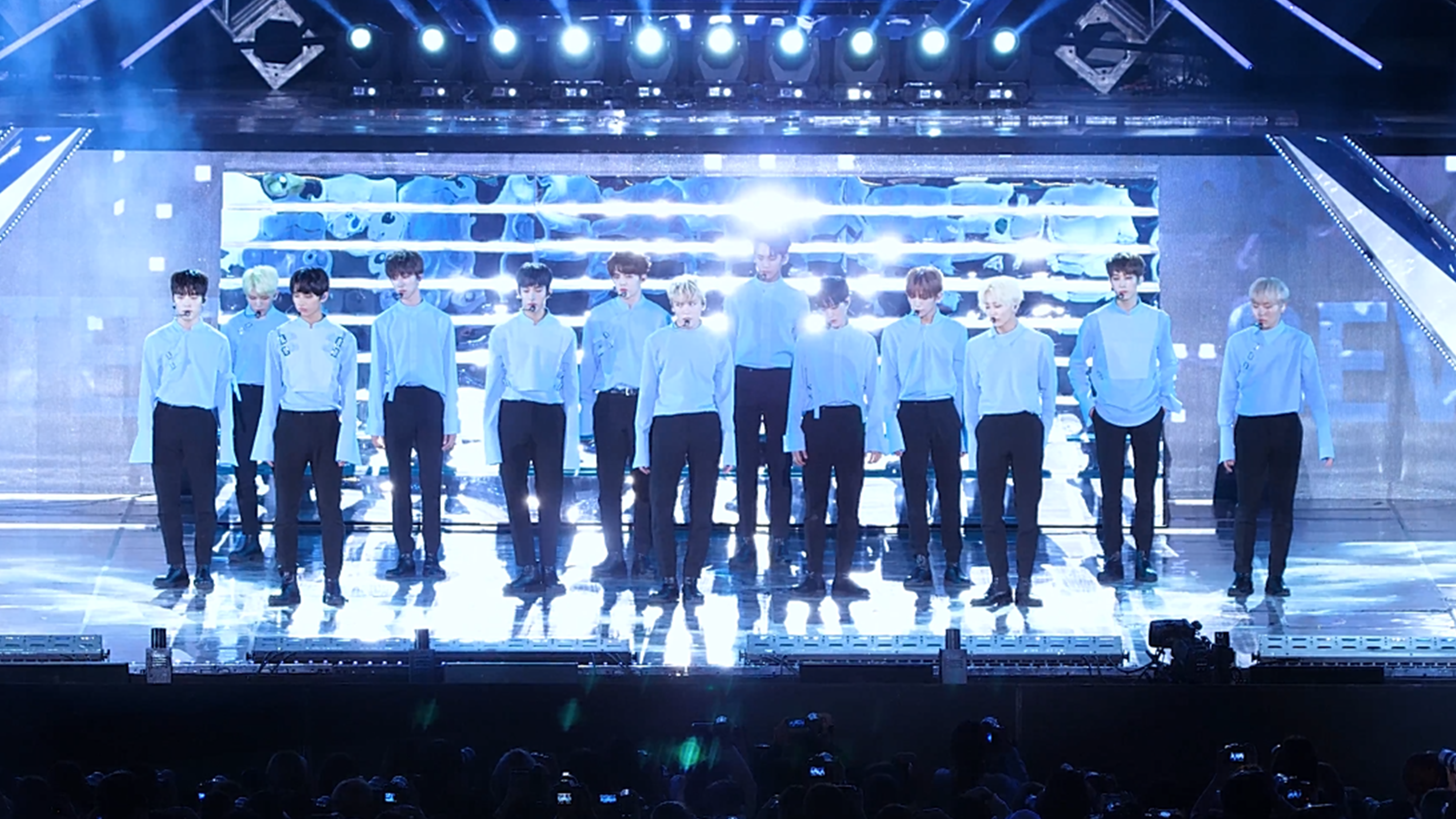
Seventeen performing "Don't Wanna Cry" at Dream Concert 2017

Seventeen embarked on the Say The Name #Seventeen tour in Japan between February 15 and 24, 2017. The shows attracted 50,000 spectators despite the group not having officially debuted in the country. On April 1, Seventeen filmed a second season of the show One Fine Day, detailing their stay in Japan. The second season was titled One Fine Day in Japan and created in collaboration between South Korean broadcaster MBC and Japanese network Music On! TV.

Seventeen's fourth EP Al1 was released on May 22. It peaked at number one in South Korea and sold over 330,000 copies by the end of the year. The lead single "Don't Wanna Cry" became one of the group's most popular tracks, with its music video becoming Seventeen's first to reach 200 million views on YouTube. Later, a series of videos titled "2017 Seventeen Project" and three music videos subtitled "Chapter 0.5 Before AL1" were uploaded to the platform. The group completed the Diamond Edge tour on October 6, which visited thirteen cities across Asia and North America. On November 6, the group released their second studio album, Teen, Age. Seventeen released a repackage of Teen, Age on February 5, 2018, titled Director's Cut, featuring lead single "Thanks". Four days later, Time magazine included Seventeen on their list of the six best K-pop groups to know.

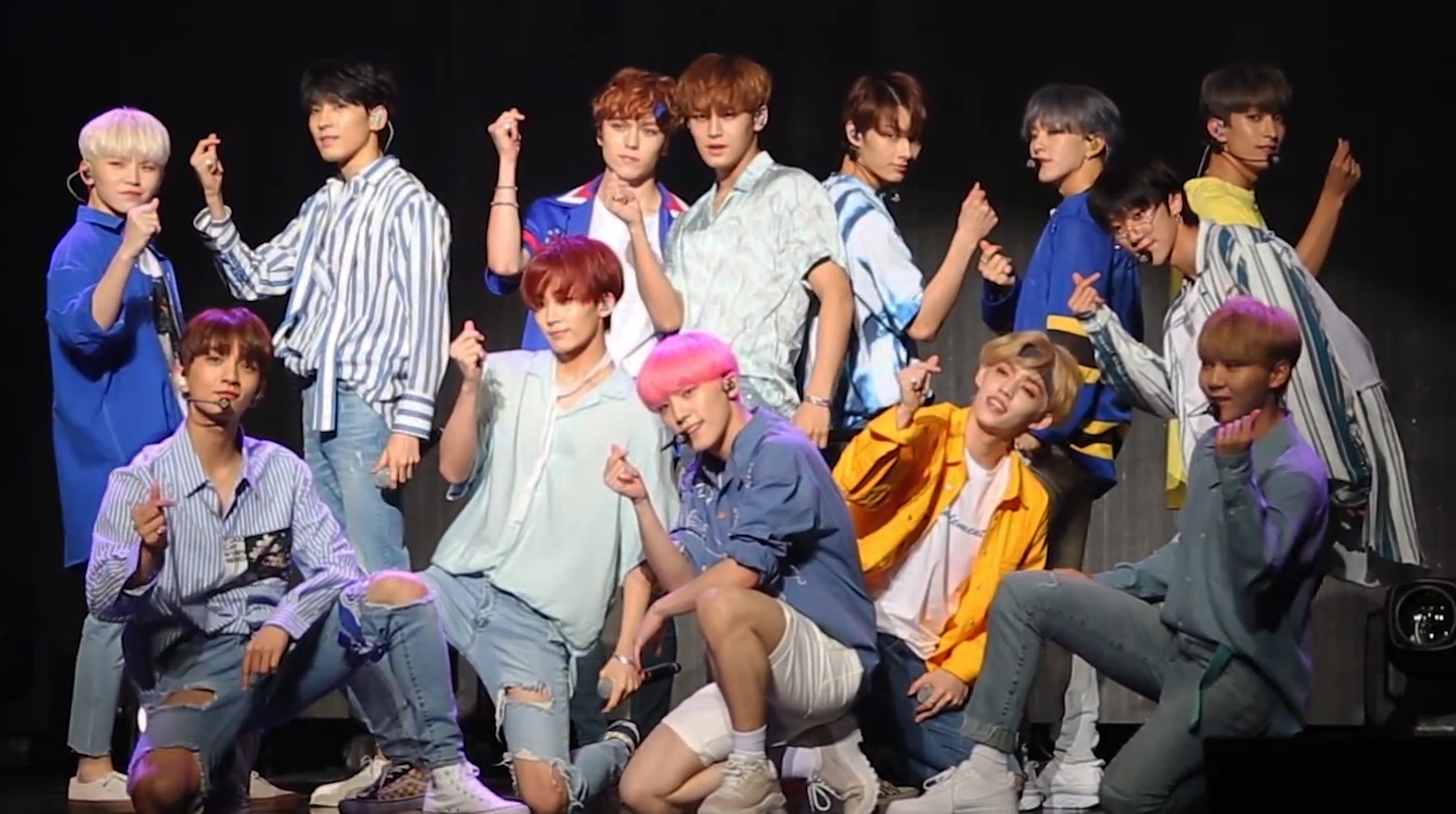
Seventeen performing "Oh My!" At You Make My Day Showcase in 2018

Seventeen officially debuted in Japan on May 30 with their first Japanese EP We Make You. They released their fifth Korean EP You Make My Day on July 16, with the lead single "Oh My!". The EP became the group's first to be certified platinum domestically. Promotions for the album took place in between the Ideal Cut tour concerts in Seoul and the tour concerts in other countries.

Seventeen released their sixth EP You Made My Dawn on January 21, 2019. The lead single "Home" won ten trophies on weekly music shows, including at least one win on each program. On May 29, Seventeen released their first Japanese single album, "Happy Ending", which peaked at number one on the Oricon Daily Singles Chart and was certified platinum by the Recording Industry Association of Japan (RIAJ). On June 24, Seventeen announced the Ode to You World Tour, with stops in Asia, North America, and Europe, although the last leg of the tour was cancelled due to the COVID-19 pandemic in 2020. Seventeen released the digital single "Hit" on August 5, ahead of their third studio album An Ode on September 16. The album sold 700,000 copies in its first week and won the group their first daesang (grand prize) for Album of the Year. It was also named the best K-pop album of the year by Billboard.

=== 2020–2021: First contract renewal and "Power of Love" project ===
On April 1, 2020, Seventeen released their second Japanese single "Fallin' Flower", which debuted atop on the Oricon Daily Singles Chart and sold more than 400,000 copies in its first week, securing first place on the Billboard Japan Hot 100 Chart. On May 13, Seventeen released the first installment of Hit The Road, a documentary series on their YouTube channel following the group behind the scenes of their Ode to You tour.

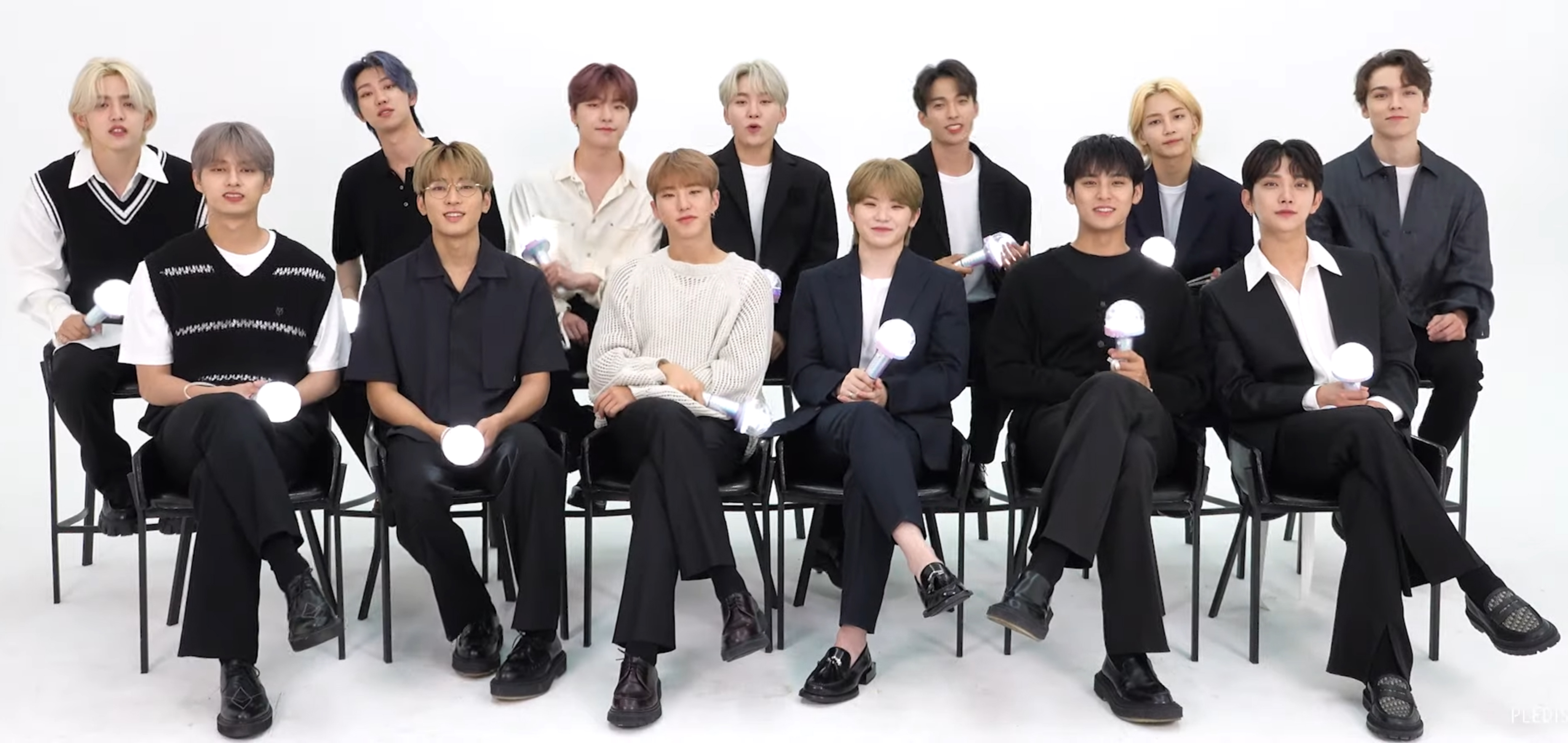
Seventeen performing a chant for "Ready to Love" in 2021

On June 22, Seventeen released their seventh EP, Heng:garæ. It sold one million copies in under one week, making Seventeen official "million sellers" and earning them certifications from both the Hanteo and Gaon charts. It charted at number one on the Oricon Weekly Album Chart for a second week, making Seventeen the first international male artist to do so since the Backstreet Boys, 12 years prior. On September 9, Seventeen released their second Japanese EP, 24H, becoming the third group ever to reach number one on the Oricon Weekly Album Chart with four consecutive albums, a feat last achieved in 1977 by Scottish pop rock band Bay City Rollers. 24H was later certified platinum by the RIAJ for selling over 250,000 copies. On October 19, Seventeen released their eighth EP, Semicolon, marketed as a "special album" with lead single "Home;Run". To promote the single, the group made their US television debut with a performance on The Late Late Show with James Corden.

On April 15, 2021, Seventeen digitally released their third Japanese single, "Not Alone"; it was physically released a week later. On May 14, the song was certified double-platinum by the RIAJ for selling over 500,000 copies. On May 18, they announced their "Power of Love" project, as well as the release of their ninth EP Your Choice through a concept trailer video. At the same time, they signed with Geffen Records and Universal Music Group for US and international distribution of their music. For the first phase of the "Power of Love" project, Seventeen released a digital single performed by Wonwoo and Mingyu, titled "Bittersweet" and featuring Lee Hi, on May 28. Your Choice was released on June 18, alongside lead single "Ready to Love". On July 19, Pledis Entertainment announced that all members of Seventeen had renewed their contracts.

On October 22, Seventeen released their tenth EP Attacca with lead single "Rock with You". Attacca sold two million copies, making it the group's first double million-selling album. On December 8, Seventeen marked the end of their "Power of Love" project by releasing a Japanese single of the same name.

=== 2022–2023: Face the Sun, record EP sales, and expanded touring ===
On April 15, 2022, Seventeen released an English-language digital single titled "Darl+ing" ahead of their fourth studio album, Face the Sun. The album was released on May 26 with the lead single "Hot". They also released their first film, Seventeen Power of Love: The Movie, in worldwide theaters on April 20 and 23 (excluding France and Japan, where it was released on April 21 and 29, respectively).

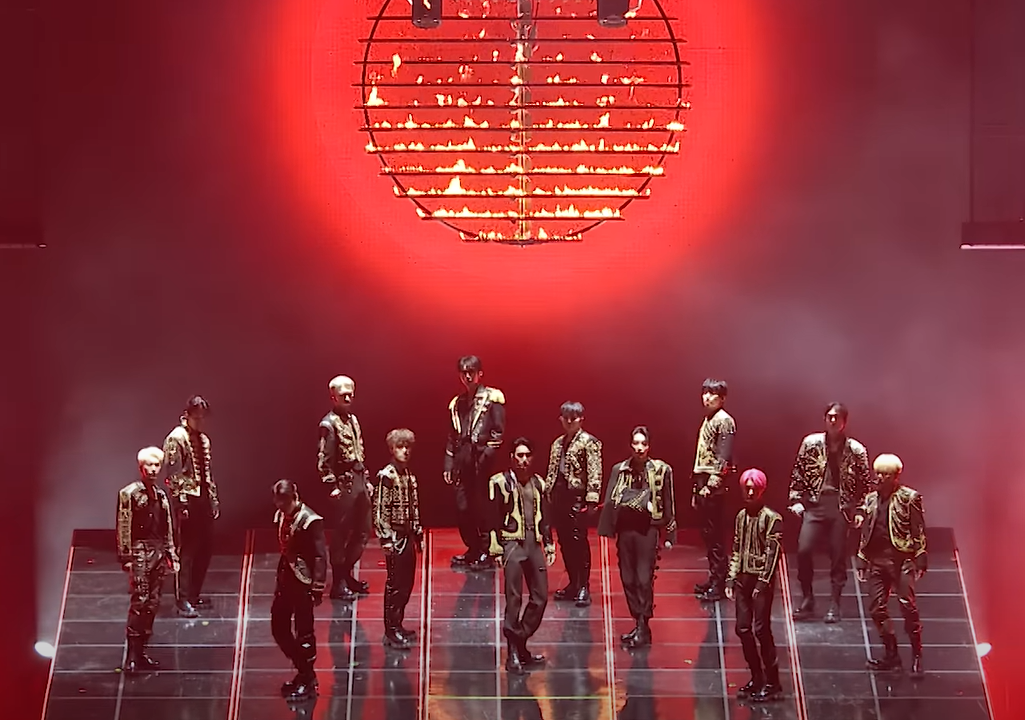
Seventeen performing in Seoul during the Be The Sun tour, June 2022

On May 7 and 8, Seventeen held the Hanabi fan meeting at Saitama Super Arena, their first in-person performance in Japan in two and a half years. In the same month, Pledis Entertainment announced the Be The Sun World Tour, Seventeen's third world tour, and their first tour after COVID-19. The tour started with performances at the Gocheok Sky Dome in Seoul in June before continuing on to a North American leg, consisting of 12 shows in arenas across the US and Canada from August 10 to September 6. Additional shows in Jakarta, Bangkok, Manila, and Singapore were held from September 24 to October 13, and the Japan leg for the Be the Sun tour was confirmed in June 2022. The group performed six shows in domes across Japan including Kyocera Dome Osaka, Tokyo Dome, and Vantelin Dome Nagoya in Aichi.

On July 18, 2022, Seventeen released the repackaged version of their fourth studio album, Sector 17, along with its lead single "_World". A remixed version of the song featuring English singer Anne-Marie was later released on August 26. On November 9, Seventeen released their third Japanese EP, Dream. The next month, the group made their first appearance at an American festival, performing on the LA3C festival's main stage at Los Angeles State Historic Park on December 10. Two final shows were held for the Be the Sun tour in Asia—December 17 at Philippine Arena and December 28 at Gelora Bung Karno Madya Stadium—making Seventeen the first K-pop acts to hold their own concerts in the venues.

On April 24, 2023, Seventeen released their eleventh Korean EP, FML. The EP recorded 4.6 million pre-orders, and became the best-selling album in history, with 3.9 million first-day sales and 4.5 million first-week sales. The EP included two lead singles, "Super" and "F*ck My Life". The group later re-released eight of their previous out-of-print albums on June 16.

=== 2023–2024: Follow Tour, compilation albums, and festival appearances ===
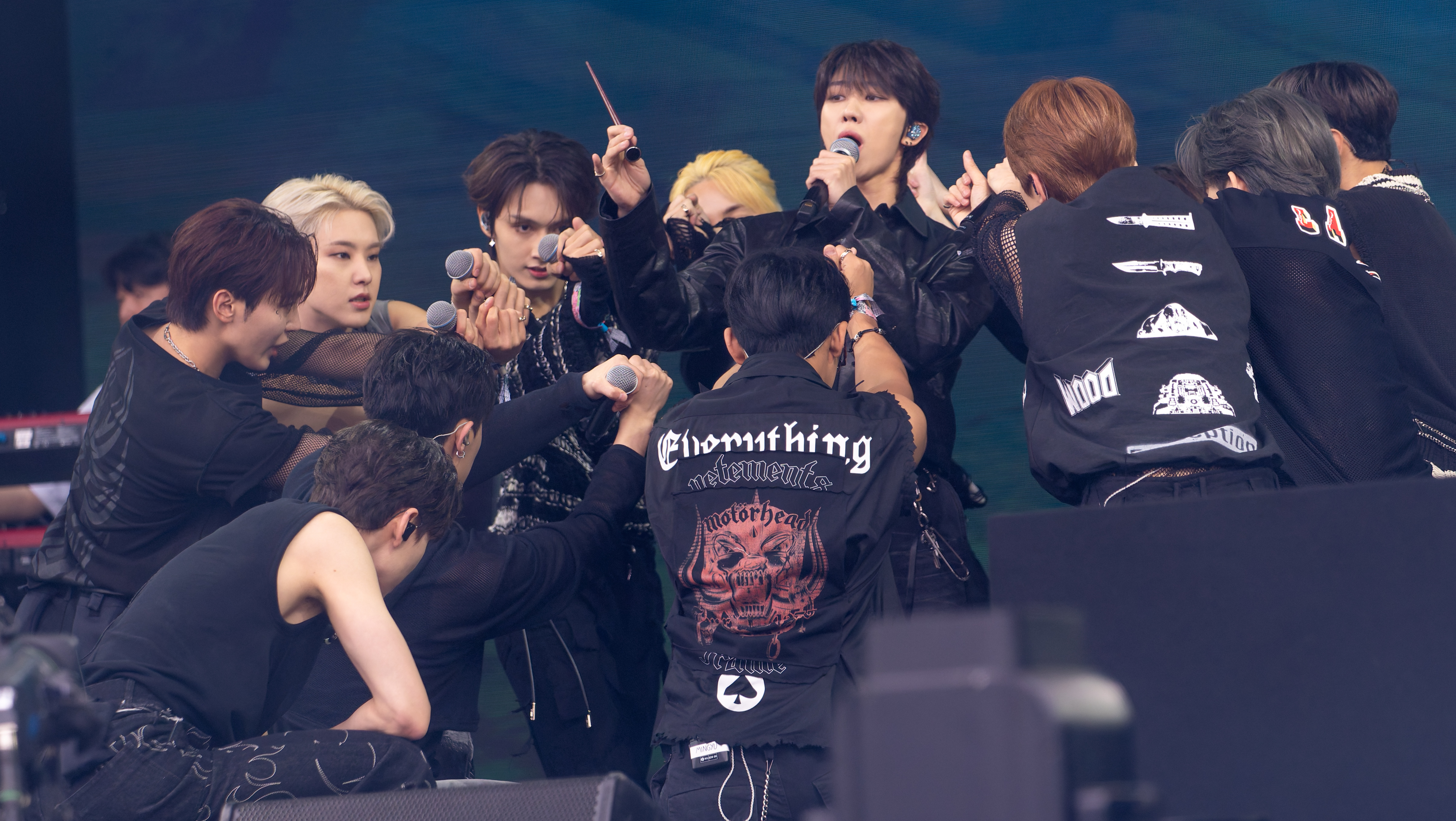
Seventeen performing "Maestro" at Glastonbury Festival in June 2024

On July 21 and 22, 2023, Seventeen held a two-day concert at the Gocheok Sky Dome to begin the Follow Tour. Alongside the Japanese dates of the tour, Seventeen released a Japanese-language best of album titled Always Yours on August 23. The group began promotions for their twelfth EP Seventeenth Heaven, later released on October 23, by announcing a street pop-up event called "Seventeen Street" in Seoul. The EP had over 5.2 million pre-orders, making it the most pre-ordered K-pop album in history. Upon its release, the EP's lead single "God of Music" debuted at number one on South Korea's Circle Digital Chart, becoming Seventeen's first song to top the weekly chart. On November 29, Seventeen earned their first MAMA Awards daesang (grand prize) for Album of the Year.

On January 6, 2024, Seventeen won three major awards in the Golden Disc Awards. The next week, they became the first K-pop group to perform a concert at the Philippine Sports Stadium in Bulacan. From March to May, the group held the encore leg of their Follow Tour, with performances at stadia in Incheon and Seoul, South Korea; and Osaka and Yokohama, Japan. The group released a compilation album titled 17 Is Right Here featuring their Korean-language singles to date on April 29, supported by the new single "Maestro".

Seventeen performed on the Pyramid Stage at Glastonbury Festival 2024, becoming the first K-pop act in history to appear at the festival, on June 28. Their set was well received by attendees and critics such as NME, who rated the performance five stars, commenting that "what start[ed] as an introduction to a group largely unfamiliar to the crowd end[ed] in giddy jubilation, with the previously uninitiated leaving the field swept up by the boundless energy pouring off the stage."

=== 2024–present: Happy Burstday, second contract renewal, and military hiatus ===
On July 24, 2024, Seventeen announced the Right Here World Tour, which began in October in Seoul. On August 12, Pledis announced that Jeonghan would enlist in the South Korean military on September 26, ahead of the release of the group's forthcoming EP in October, and that Jun would be taking a break from group activities in South Korea in favor of acting work in China, ahead of the group's scheduled performance at Lollapalooza Berlin on September 8. Seventeen performed at the festival's main stage, becoming the first K-pop act to headline the German edition of the festival. The set was well received by fans and critics.

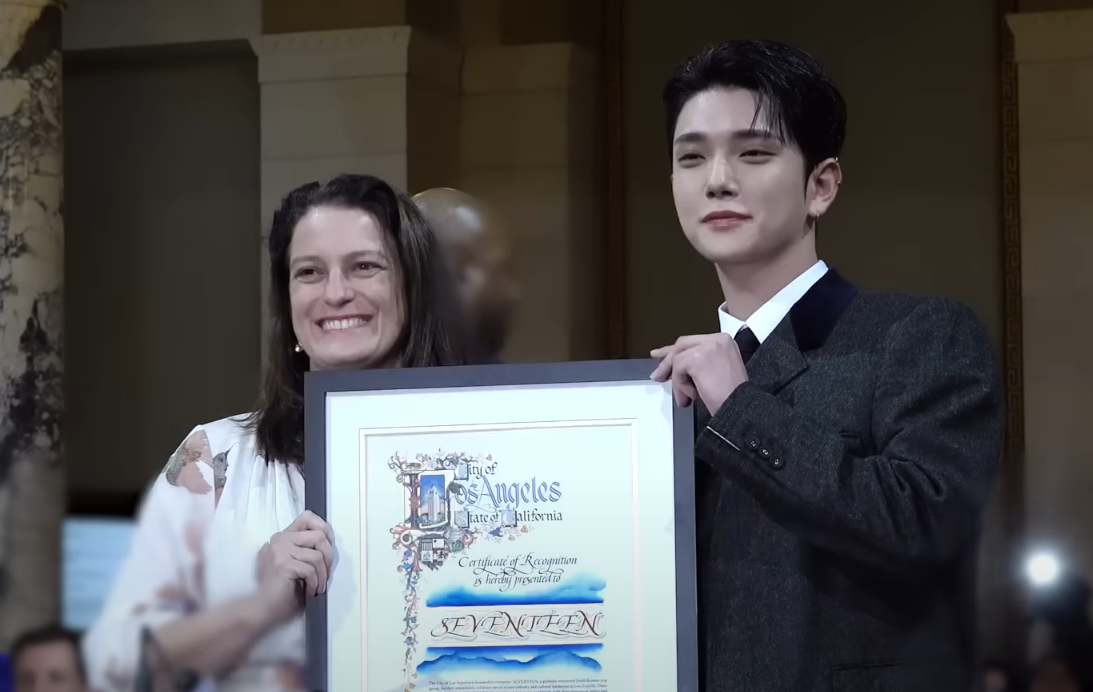
Joshua accepting a certificate of recognition from LA City Councilwoman Katy Yaroslavsky

Seventeen released their thirteenth EP Spill the Feels on October 14, alongside the lead single "Love, Money, Fame" featuring DJ Khaled. On November 11, the group digitally released "Shohikigen", with a physical release on November 27. The group made their US stadium debut on November 9 at BMO Stadium in Los Angeles. While in Los Angeles, the LA City Council honored the group for its contribution to music and youth empowerment, with Los Angeles native Joshua accepting the award on behalf of the group.

In January 2025, Seventeen were featured on the song "Bad Influence", produced by American record producer and fashion designer Pharrell Williams, for the soundtrack of the Louis Vuitton FW 2025 show in Paris. As a tribute to their fans on February 14, the group released "Encircled". On April 3, Wonwoo became the second member of the group to begin his enlistment period. The following day, Seventeen became the first K-pop act to perform at Pa'l Norte in Monterrey.

Seventeen's fifth studio album, Happy Burstday, was released on May 26, the group's tenth anniversary, including the participation of all thirteen members. The group also hinted at the announcement of a new tour and the debut of a new sub-unit. A day before the album's official release, Seventeen performed a showcase to an audience of over 200,000 at the Jamsu Bridge in Seoul, including Happy Burstday's lead single, "Thunder".

Woozi and Hoshi began their military services on September 15 and 16, respectively, following the completion of the pair's Warning Tour. The nine remaining members of the group embarked on the group's sixth concert tour, the New World Tour. The8, Mingyu, and Vernon were credited as Seventeen on a remix of PinkPantheress' "Illegal", released October 10. On October 15, Seventeen announced Seventeen: Our Chapter, a documentary TV series on Disney+ chronicling the group's ten-year history.

On April 5, 2026, S.Coups announced at a concert that all thirteen members of the group had again decided to renew their contracts with Pledis Entertainment; Pledis announced in July that the contracts had been finalized. Seventeen held their 10th South Korean fan meeting on June 21 and 22, their last collective activity ahead of further military enlistments. The group plan to return as thirteen members by 2028, following a "temporary chapter apart". Vernon enlisted in August, DK and Mingyu in September, and Seungkwan and Dino are set to enlist in October.

== Members ==
Positions and teams are adapted from profiles by Weverse Magazine and Cosmopolitan Philippines.

=== Hip-hop team ===
Active members

- S.Coups (에스쿱스) – group leader, hip-hop unit leader, rapper

Inactive members

- Wonwoo (원우, inactive due to military service) – rapper
- Vernon (버논, inactive due to military service) – rapper
- Mingyu (민규, inactive due to military service) – rapper

=== Vocal team ===
Active members

- Jeonghan (정한) – vocalist
- Joshua (조슈아) – vocalist

Inactive members

- Woozi (우지, inactive due to military service) – vocal unit leader, vocalist, producer
- DK / Dokyeom (도겸, inactive due to military service) – vocalist
- Seungkwan (승관, inactive due to military service) – vocalist

=== Performance team ===
Active members

- Jun (준) – dancer, vocalist
- The8 (디에잇) – dancer, vocalist

Inactive members

- Hoshi (호시, inactive due to military service) – performance unit leader, dancer, vocalist, rapper
- Dino (디노), inactive due to military service) – dancer, vocalist, rapper

== Sub-units ==
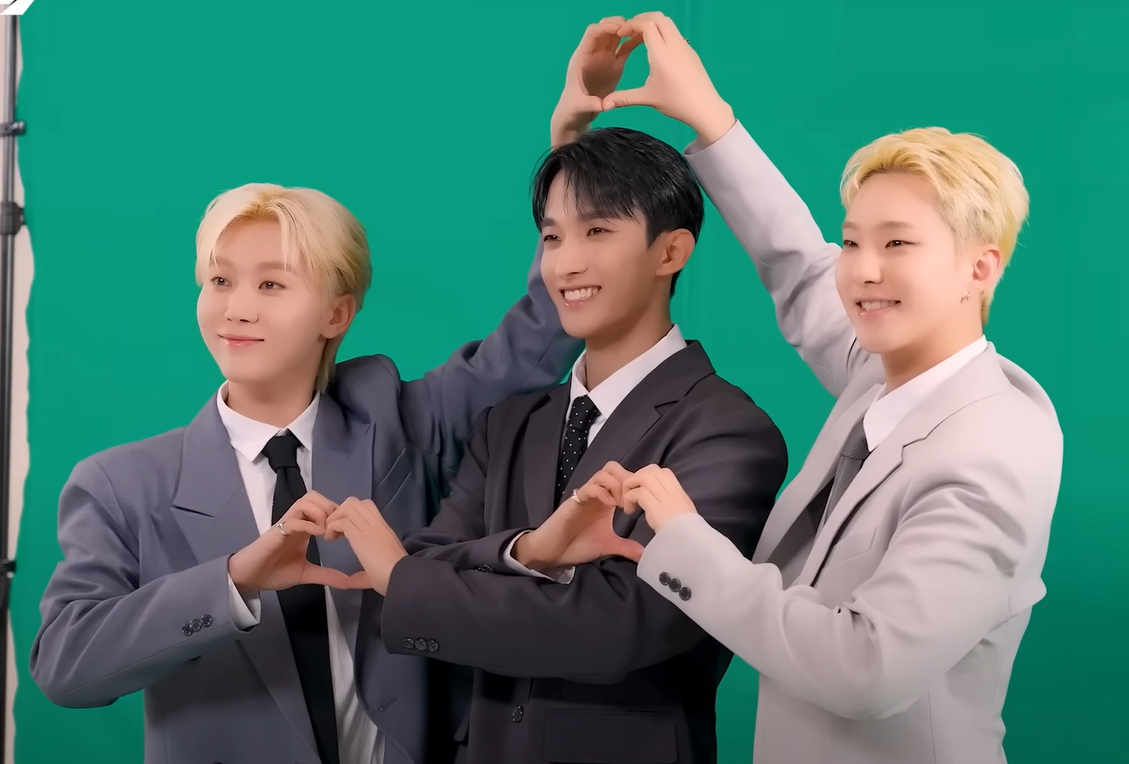
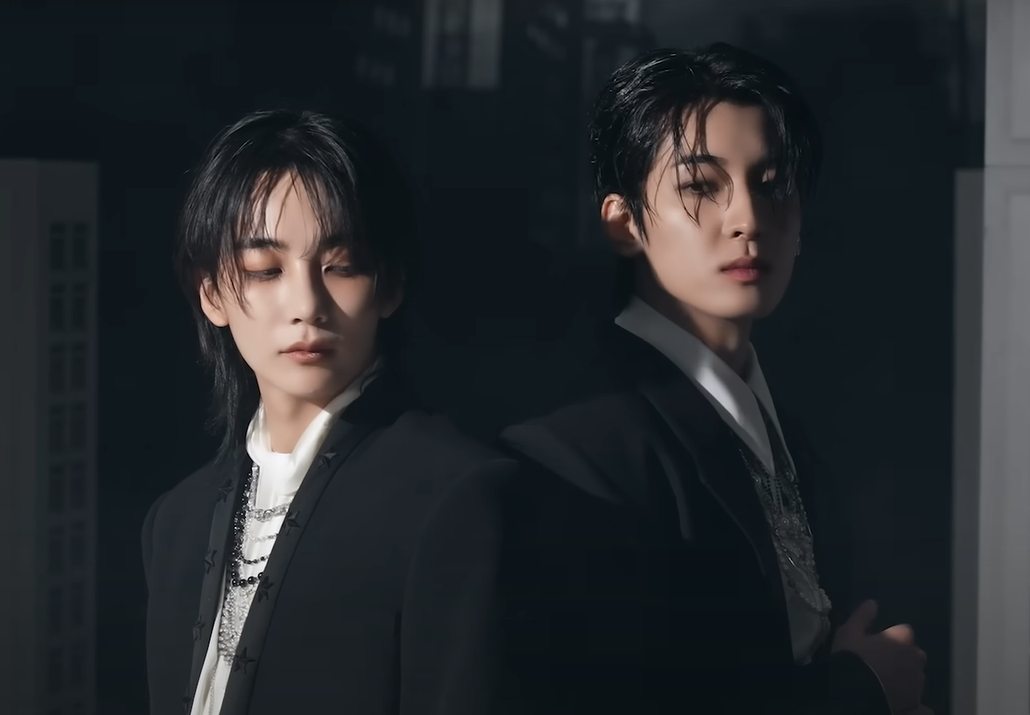
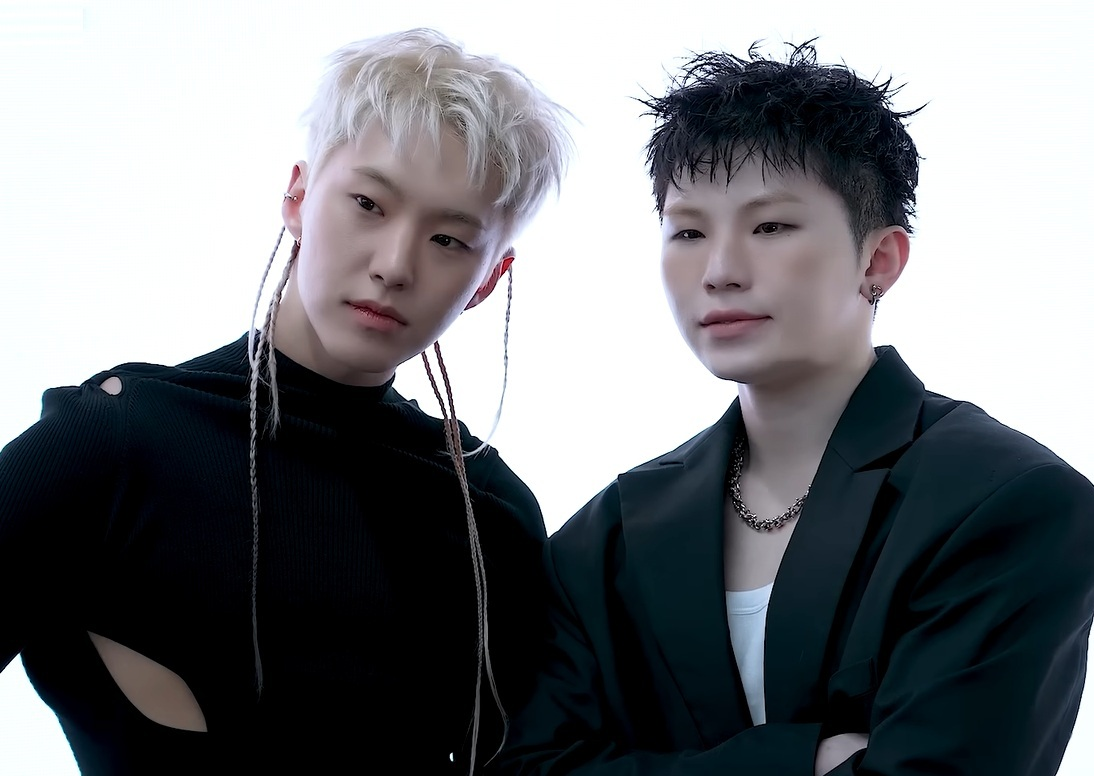
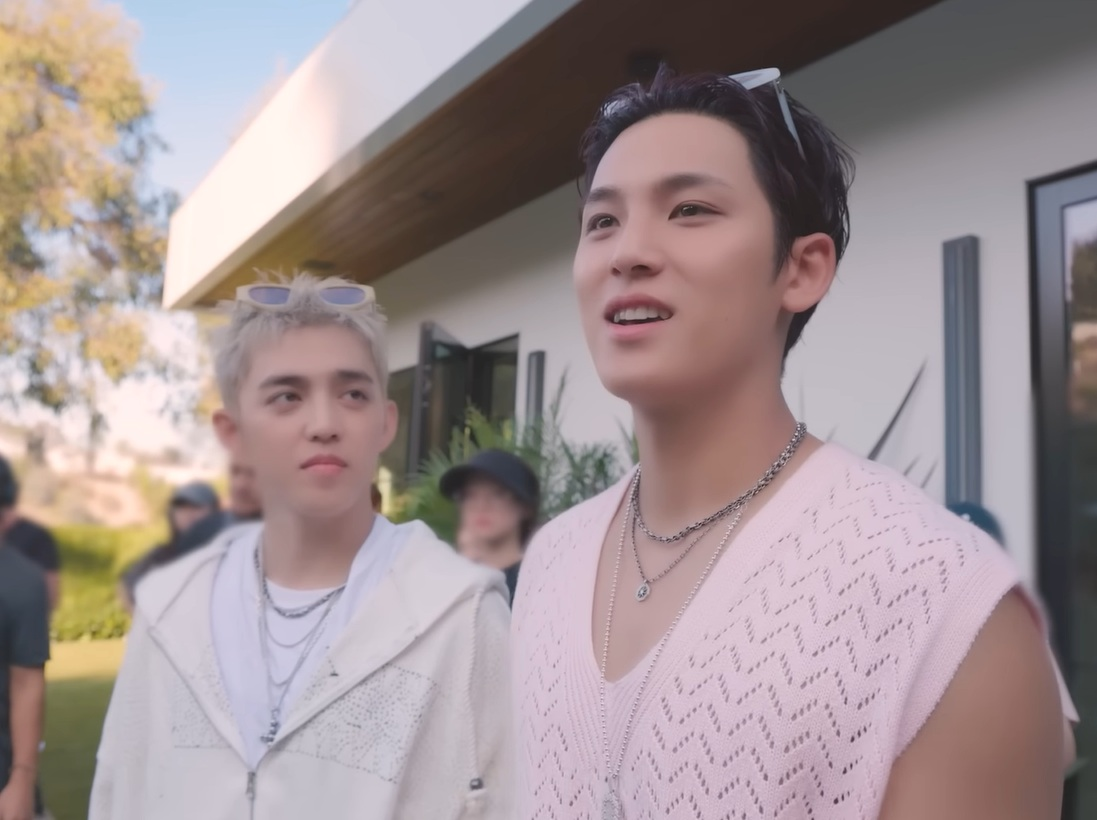
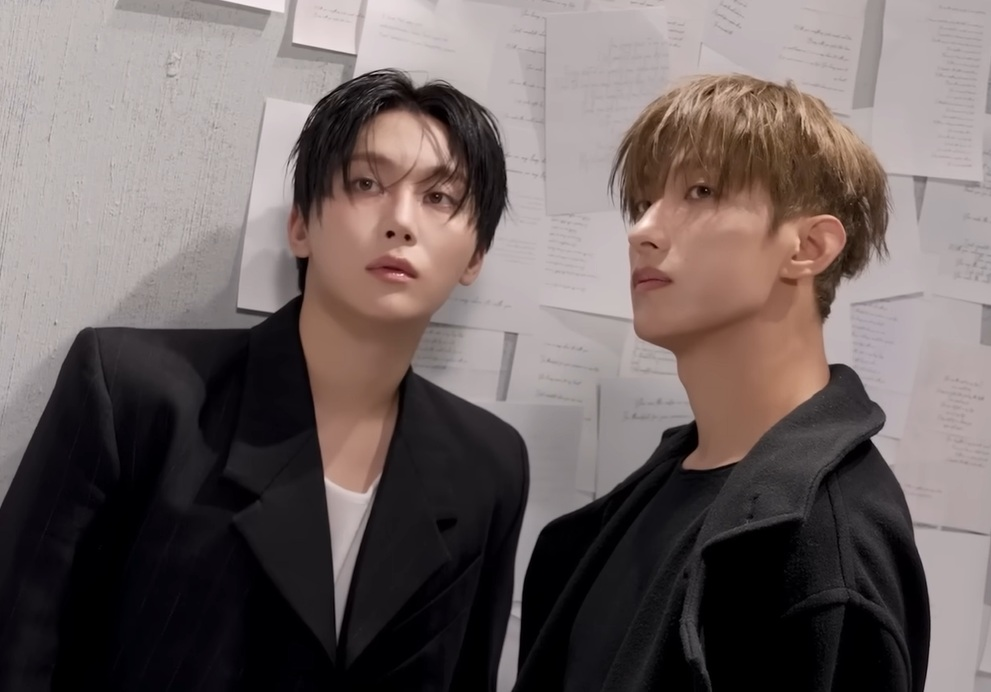
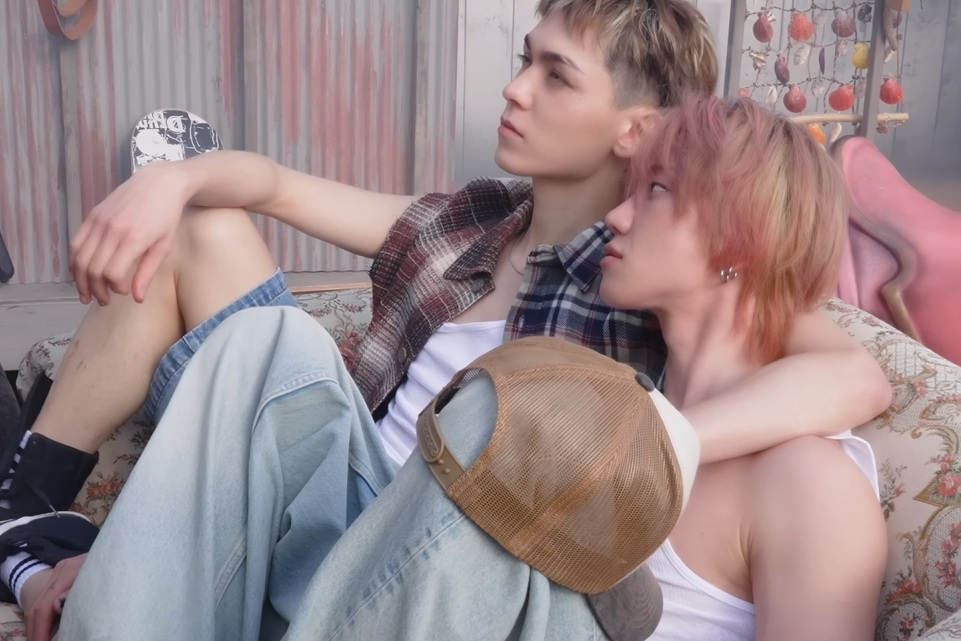
From top to bottom: BSS for Teleparty, JxW for This Man, HxW for Beam, CxM for Hype Vibes, DxS for Serenade, and V8 for V8

=== BSS ===
On March 21, 2018, DK, Seungkwan, and Hoshi debuted as a sub-unit called BSS or "BooSeokSoon" (부석순), a combination of the members' names. They released their first single "Just Do It" and promoted for a brief period. In January 2023, Pledis announced that BSS would return after five years with their first single album Second Wind on February 6. It was led by lead single "Fighting", featuring rapper Lee Young-ji. On release, Second Wind sold over 478,000 copies, breaking the first-week sales record for an album released by a K-pop band sub-unit. BSS earned their first ever music show award on February 15, for "Fighting" on the MBC M's Show Champion. On January 8, 2025, BSS released their second single album Teleparty alongside its lead single "CBZ (Prime Time)".

=== JxW ===
On May 20, 2024, a single album titled This Man was announced, featuring Jeonghan and Wonwoo as Jeonghan X Wonwoo. The album was released on June 17 with the lead single "Last Night", and a solo song from each member. Within a week of its release, This Man recorded 787,046 copies, setting a new first-week sales record for an album by a K-pop sub-unit. The album peaked at number 3 on South Korea's Circle Album Chart. The album sold a total of 529,936 copies during its first week of release.

=== Hoshi X Woozi ===
Hoshi and Woozi first released music together with "Bring It", a b-side song from their group's 2017 album Teen, Age. On February 18, 2025, Pledis announced the official debut of a third sub-unit to be composed of Hoshi and Woozi. The pair's debut single album Beam was released on March 10, consisting of three songs including the lead single "96ers" (동갑내기). The album debuted at number 2 on the Circle Album Chart and number 3 on Japan's Oricon Albums Chart.

=== S.Coups X Mingyu ===
Ahead of the release of Happy Burstday, Seventeen announced that a new sub-unit would be debuting in 2025. The unit was confirmed to be made up of Hip-hop team members S.Coups and Mingyu, with the unit name CxM. Their debut EP, Hype Vibes, was released on September 29. The EP includes six songs, including a collaboration with American rapper Lay Bankz titled "5, 4, 3 (Pretty Woman)".

=== DK X Seungkwan ===
BSS members DK and Seungkwan debuted as Seventeen's fifth sub-unit in January 2026. Their debut EP, Serenade (소야곡), was released on January 12. Serenade debuted at number 3 on the Circle Album Chart.

=== V8 ===
Pledis Entertainment announced in March 2026 that Vernon and The8 were preparing to form another Seventeen's sub-unit. Under the name V8, their eponymous EP was released on June 29, 2026. The EP debuted atop the Circle Album Chart with 550,000 sales.

=== Jeonghan X Joshua ===
Following the conclusion of his military service, Jeonghan was announced to be in the next new sub-unit to debut, alongside Joshua. The pair debuted in October 2026. JxJ released Dreamscape, a six-track EP, on October 19, 2026, which debuted at number one of the Circle Album Chart with 900,000 sale. The pair embarked on a six-city tour to promote Dreamscape, starting in October in Incheon and set to conclude in February 2027.

== Solo work ==
=== The Thirteen Tapes ===
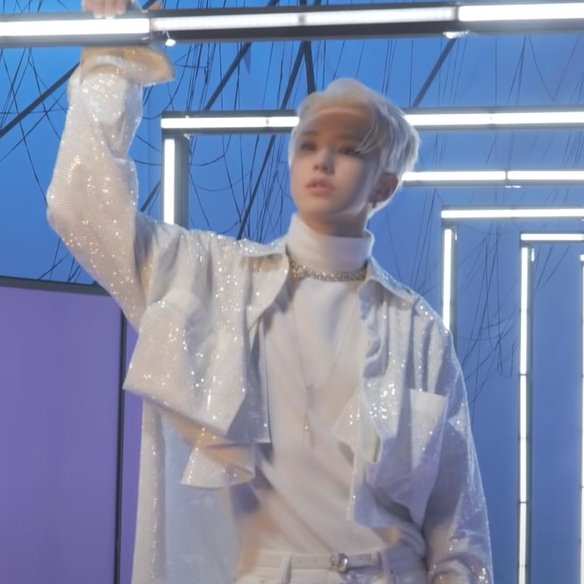
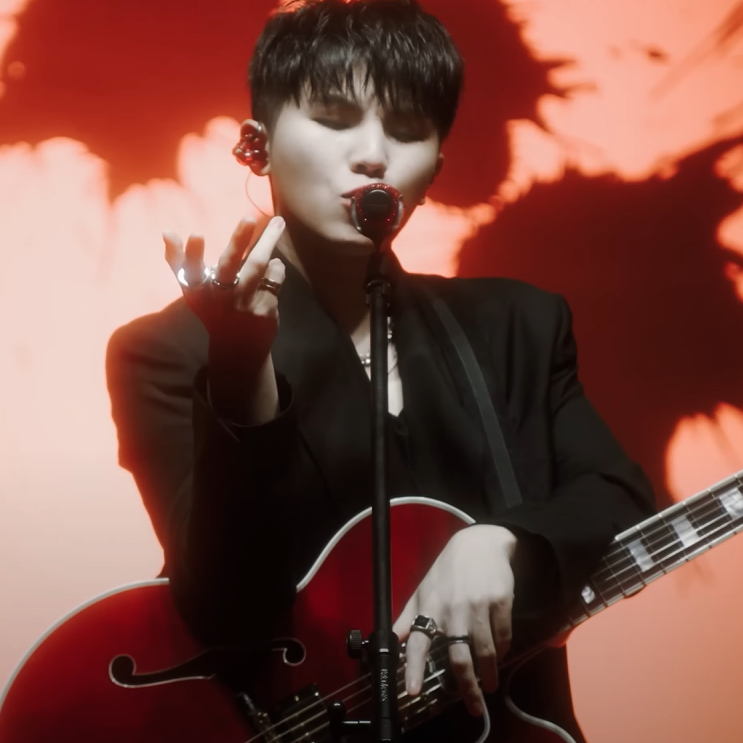
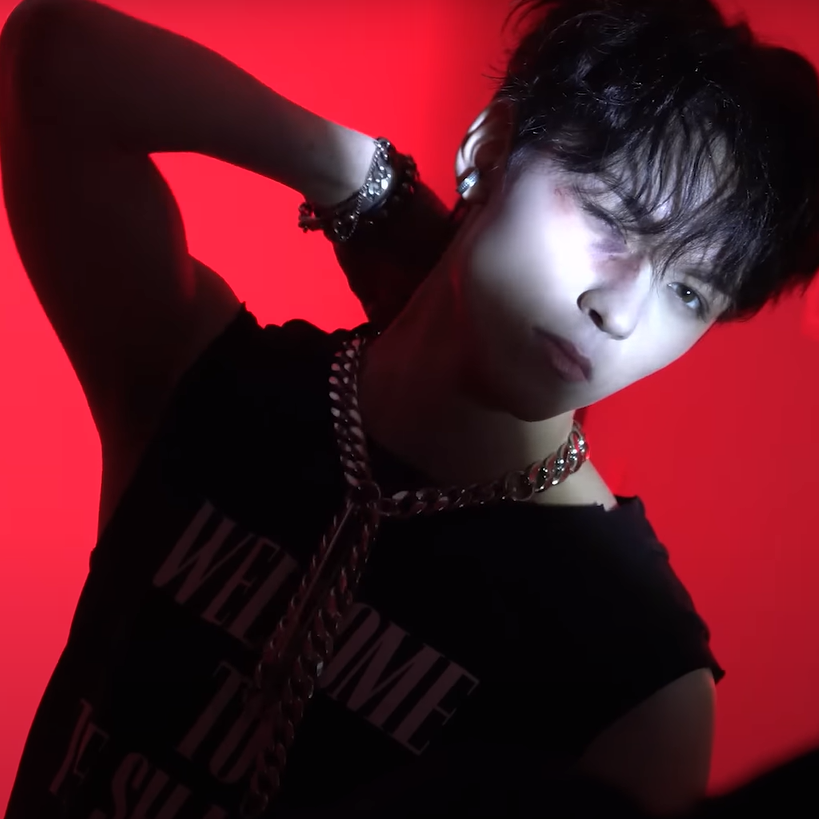
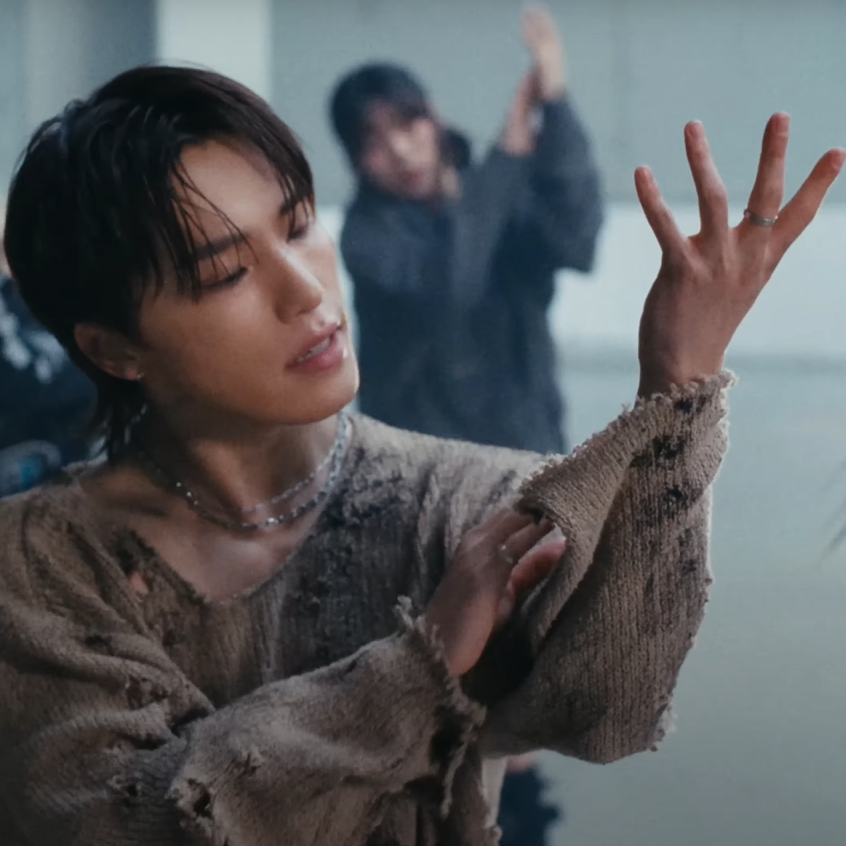
Clockwise from upper left: Hoshi for "Spider", Woozi for "Ruby", Dino for "Wait", and Vernon for "Black Eye".

Outside of their digital singles and soundtrack appearances, members of Seventeen began releasing singles in 2021 as part of the group's project, The Thirteen Tapes. Since 2021, four members have released their installments.

Hoshi released "Spider" on April 2, 2021. "Spider" features R&B sounds and an acrobatic choreography to match the song's title. Woozi released the next single "Ruby" on January 3, 2022. The fully English track features a rock sound. The third member to release a single was Vernon, with "Black Eye" on December 23, 2022. Dino was the fourth member, with "Wait," released on November 27, 2023, featuring a high-energy dance-pop melody.

=== Soundtrack appearances ===
Seventeen have worked on multiple OSTs, appearing more often as individual members but occasionally as a full group. Some select media that the group has contributed to include South Korean television shows, such as Twenty-Five Twenty-One and Falling into Your Smile, and the web drama A-Teen.

=== Other language releases ===
Jun and The8 have released music in Chinese, including Jun's "Limbo," which was released on September 23, 2022, and The8's "Side By Side," which was released on April 13, 2021. Jeonghan has released music in Japanese, with "Dream", a non-album single, released in both Japanese and Korean.

== Artistry ==
=== Musical style ===
Since their debut, Seventeen have been heavily involved in their creative process. Woozi has written and produced each of the band's tracks, with contribution from other members. The group's choreography has also largely been influenced by performance team leader Hoshi. This has contributed to the group's distinctive musical style, with each comeback characterized by a new sound. Woozi explained in an interview with The Korean Herald, "Our participation ... went much further than just contributing our opinions. The leaders of the three unit groups went to every album production meeting to make sure that we could tell our own story."

While generally categorized under the K-pop and pop music genres, Seventeen's music has also incorporated influences from other genres including EDM, rock, country and jazz, among others. Despite the different genre shifts and experimental forms they take with their music, the group shares their goal is to be authentic and honest with the music they share.

=== Lyrical themes ===
Seventeen's self-producing nature enables them to be authentic in their music and better connect with fans. Their lyrics range from a variety of topics as self-producing allows the group to write and sing their own verses. For example, the group's hip-hop unit, composed of S.Coups, Wonwoo, Mingyu, and Vernon, often write and implement their styles into their songs. In an interview with Billboard, Wonwoo positively commented on the process: "It adds a great extent of diversity within the track, and it's fun because we all sound very different and each have a very different [verse]."

"Since the very beginning, every time before we release our music, we come together for a meeting and discuss what story we want to tell, what narrative fits us right now, and what the public wants to hear. We then personalize these ideas. It's always been like that,"

— Wonwoo, Billboard

Wanting listeners to relate to their music, the group has stated their intention to show that they face the same issues and experiences that their fans encounter. Their songs cover a variety of themes, including perseverance through life's struggles, finding comfort in others' company, celebrating one's accomplishments, and reaching new heights. The group members have also admitted to pulling inspiration from everyday real-life experiences and musical role models, among others.

=== Japanese, English, and Chinese releases ===
As K-pop artists, Seventeen's music and performances cater to both Korean and international audiences. In addition to their core discography, they have released Japanese songs such as "Fallin' Flower" and "Not Alone", alongside Japanese-language versions of previously released songs. In 2023, they released Always Yours, a compilation album featuring all of their Japanese releases to date. In 2024, they released 17 Is Right Here, an equivalent compilation of Korean releases which included Korean-language versions of the group's Japanese songs.

In 2022, Seventeen released their first full English song, "Darl+ing", off their Face the Sun album. "Even if we released – like beforehand – all Korean songs, they would try to interpret it and translate it in order to understand our lyrics. It was kind of like a thank you gift to our Carats," Joshua said in a Grammy interview when discussing "Darl+ing." In 2023, they worked with music producer Marshmello to release "SOS", another fully English song. Seventeen has released songs in Chinese. During a concert in Macau, the group performed a new song titled "相遇的意义" (lit. 'The Meaning of Meeting'); they have also released Chinese versions of their Korean tracks.

=== Choreography ===
Seventeen's performances often feature intricate choreography. They frequently use their bigger group size to their advantage to create formations and tell a story through their dances. Hoshi often co-choreographs pieces for the team, with contributions from the other three members of the unit. The group is also well regarded for their dance synchronization.

== Other ventures ==
=== Endorsements ===
On October 13, 2016, Seventeen were announced as models for the American perfume brand Clean. On January 9, 2017, DD Chicken announced that they selected Seventeen as their new models for the year. In April 2017, Seventeen were chosen as new advertisement models for the uniform brand Elite, announcing that the group would start advertising and marketing activities for the brand from the second half of the year. On September 29, sports brand Dynafit announced that it selected Seventeen as models. On December 1, Global Eco cosmetic brand The Saem announced Seventeen as its new advertising models to promote products such as the Urban Eco skincare series.

On August 31, 2018, Seventeen were selected as new advertising models for the outdoor lifestyle brand Lafuma. On November 1, Seventeen were selected as advertising models for the chicken franchise Nene Chicken alongside labelmates NU'EST W. On February 7, 2019, Seventeen were selected as advertising models for AO+ colored lenses, introducing special color lenses for each member. On September 23, Seventeen were chosen as honorary ambassadors for the Korea Brand & Content Expo 2019 in Dubai. On December 5, the group were appointed ambassadors for the COEX Winter Festival.

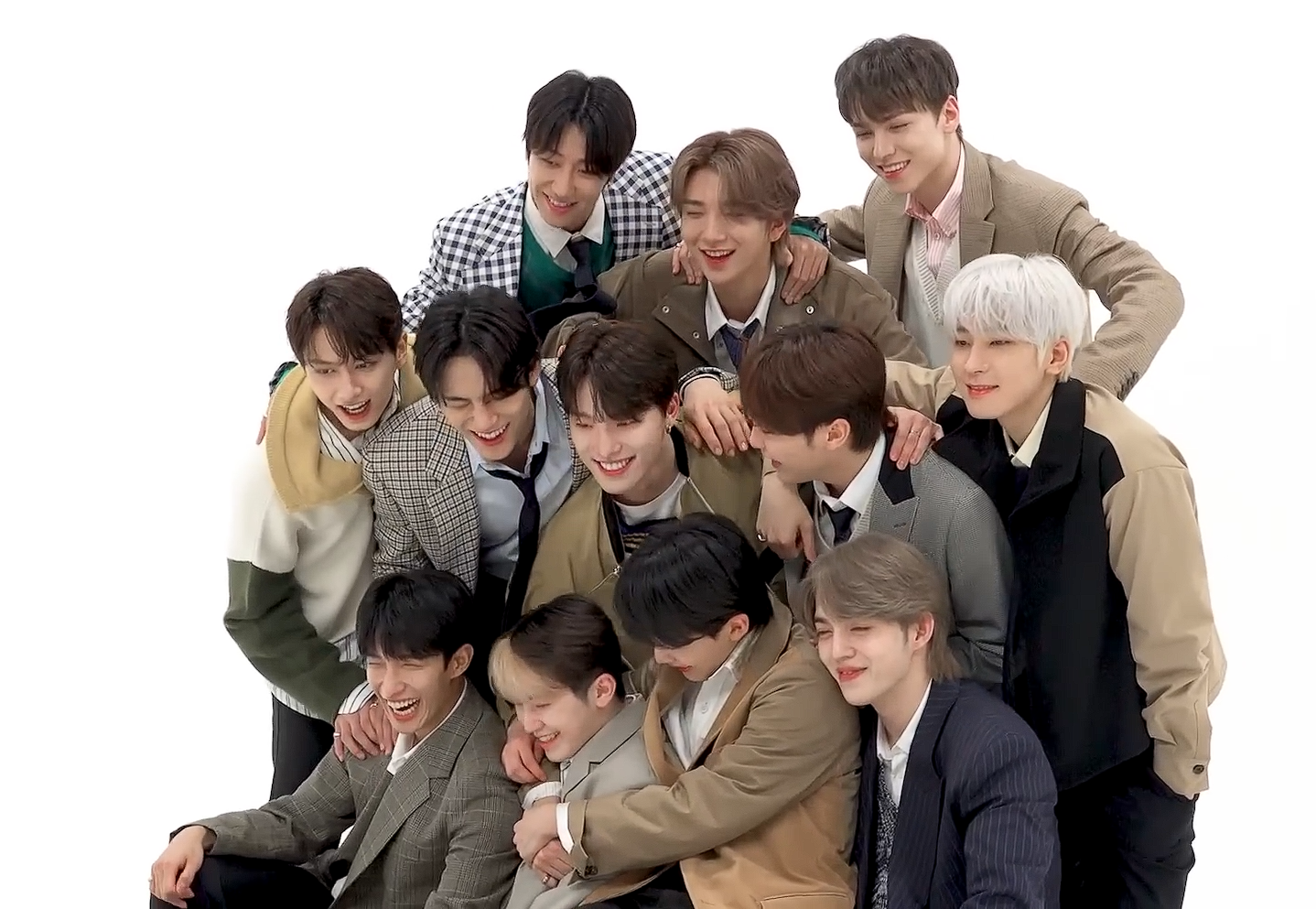
Seventeen for Apple in 2022

On September 6, 2021, it was announced that Seventeen would be partnering with Cigna to help individuals accomplish their goals via the personal wellness coach Tune H platform. On October 19, Lazada named Seventeen as their first regional happiness ambassadors, ahead of its annual flagship 11.11 shopping festival. The group starred in Lazada's 11.11 film and performed at its virtual concert on November 10. In April 2022, Seventeen collaborated with Apple helping global fans experience their music in more creative ways. The group became the first K-pop artist to participate in the company's remix session program to commemorate the opening of a new Apple store in Myeong-dong, South Korea and the release of Seventeen's digital single "Darl+ing" on April 15.

In May 2024, Seventeen was announced as the global ambassador for Thai beverage brand Mogu Mogu, who appointed the group as the face of its "Sip Chew Feel" campaign. In May 2025, the group was selected to be the first-ever global ambassador for South Korean food brand Bibigo under its "Taste What's Beyond" campaign.

=== Collaborations ===
Starting in 2024, Seventeen released two personally designed homeware collections in collaboration with South Korean department store franchise Shinsegae; both collections were displayed in the store's Gangnam branch. In July 2025, Seventeen celebrated the group's tenth anniversary by partnering with Japanese collectible brand Bearbrick to release a limited edition collection featuring a total of 26 figures, with each of the group's 13 members designing two Bearbrick models. In October, Seventeen announced a collaboration with The Smurfs with plans to release a "reimagined" music video for "God of Music" and a character merchandise collection based on the group's members.

=== Philanthropy ===
Seventeen have frequently marked their debut anniversaries with charitable donations, with much of their group philanthropy focused on children, education and youth. After receiving their first earnings, in 2016 the group donated 13 goats, each named after one of the members, to children in Tanzania. The goats provided milk and a potential source of income, as their offspring could be sold to help cover educational expenses. The members later received a photograph and letter from a child who wrote that they would raise their goat in pursuit of their dream. The donation marked the beginning of Seventeen's recurring anniversary philanthropy, with the group making contributions to children's organizations and foundations on subsequent debut anniversaries.

In 2017, Seventeen participated in "Letters from Angels" as part of its 15th anniversary; the adoption campaign, run by Korea's Social Welfare Society and photographer Seihon Cho, raises awareness for orphans and single mothers by displaying photos with celebrities to promote adoption. On their third anniversary, Seventeen worked with 1st Look magazine to design and sell personalized T-shirts made by the members, donating proceeds to those in need. Ahead of their fourth anniversary, Seventeen donated to a campaign by ChildFund Korea that provides housing support to children in need under the name of their fan club, Carat. Members Mingyu and Seungkwan personally designed the signboard that they also gave.

On their fifth anniversary, Seventeen donated to children and adolescents in need, specifically supporting education for the youth, including educational mentoring for children of multicultural families, scholarships, and cultural and arts education. In 2020, Seventeen collaborated with jewelry designer Francesca Amfitheatrof and her brand Thief and Heist on a limited-edition eco-friendly bracelet called "The Tag". The bracelets were made of recycled plastic, and a portion of the proceeds was donated to the Plastic Bank organization to help preserve the environment.

On their sixth anniversary, Pledis Entertainment revealed that the group made a donation to the international humanitarian non-governmental organization Good Neighbors in order to assist children who have been victims of abuse. Their donation helped fund the victims' recovery and psychological treatment, in addition to supporting the improvement of their emotional stability and the restoration of their daily lives at home. On their seventh anniversary, Seventeen made donations to the underprivileged around the world to commemorate the seventh anniversary of their debut. The group's donation went to the UNESCO Korean National Commission's Global Education Sharing Project to help those such as children and teenagers in Africa and Asia receive an education. In March 2025, Seventeen donated 1 billion KRW through the Hope Bridge National Disaster Relief Association to help the victims of the wildfires that occurred in the Ulsan, Gyeongbuk, and Gyeongnam regions.

==== "Going Together" campaign and Goodwill Ambassadorship ====
In 2022, Seventeen launched a global campaign for the UNESCO Korean National Commission in support of a sustainable "future of education". On August 2, the Korean National Commission for UNESCO announced that it signed a business agreement with Pledis Entertainment to strengthen cooperation in education, including hosting the "Going Together" global campaign to encourage youth participation and interest. Through the campaign, Seventeen would promote the importance of education and encourage young people to participate in various educational activities to share the message of "Let's move forward together" for the future of sustainable education. The group expanded the campaign by donating part of the profits of their third world tour, Be the Sun, in addition to donations for the seventh anniversary of their debut.

In celebration of International Day of Education, on January 24, 2023, the Korean National Commission for UNESCO shared a new font inspired by Seventeen's mascot, Bongbongie, for a donation campaign running from January 24 to February 28. The font, made available for download after a minimum donation of $1.50 to UNESCO, "reflects 6-year old Bongbongie's newly-learned letters [and] symbolizes the importance of literacy and the joy of learning." On November 14, Seventeen went to the UNESCO headquarters in France and gave a speech and a performance.

In April 2024, Seventeen collaborated with the Korean National Commission for UNESCO to establish two community learning centers in East Timor, in an effort to provide education to marginalized students. On June 26, Seventeen was officially named as UNESCO's first-ever Goodwill Ambassador for Youth. Accepting the position, the group announced that they would pledge US$1 million to the joint Global Youth Grant Scheme with UNESCO for the next chapter of the "Going Together" campaign. To commemorate their 11th anniversary as a group, in 2026 they made a donation to the Korean National Commission for UNESCO, specifically for a scholarship program supporting lower secondary school enrollment in Laos.

== Awards and achievements ==
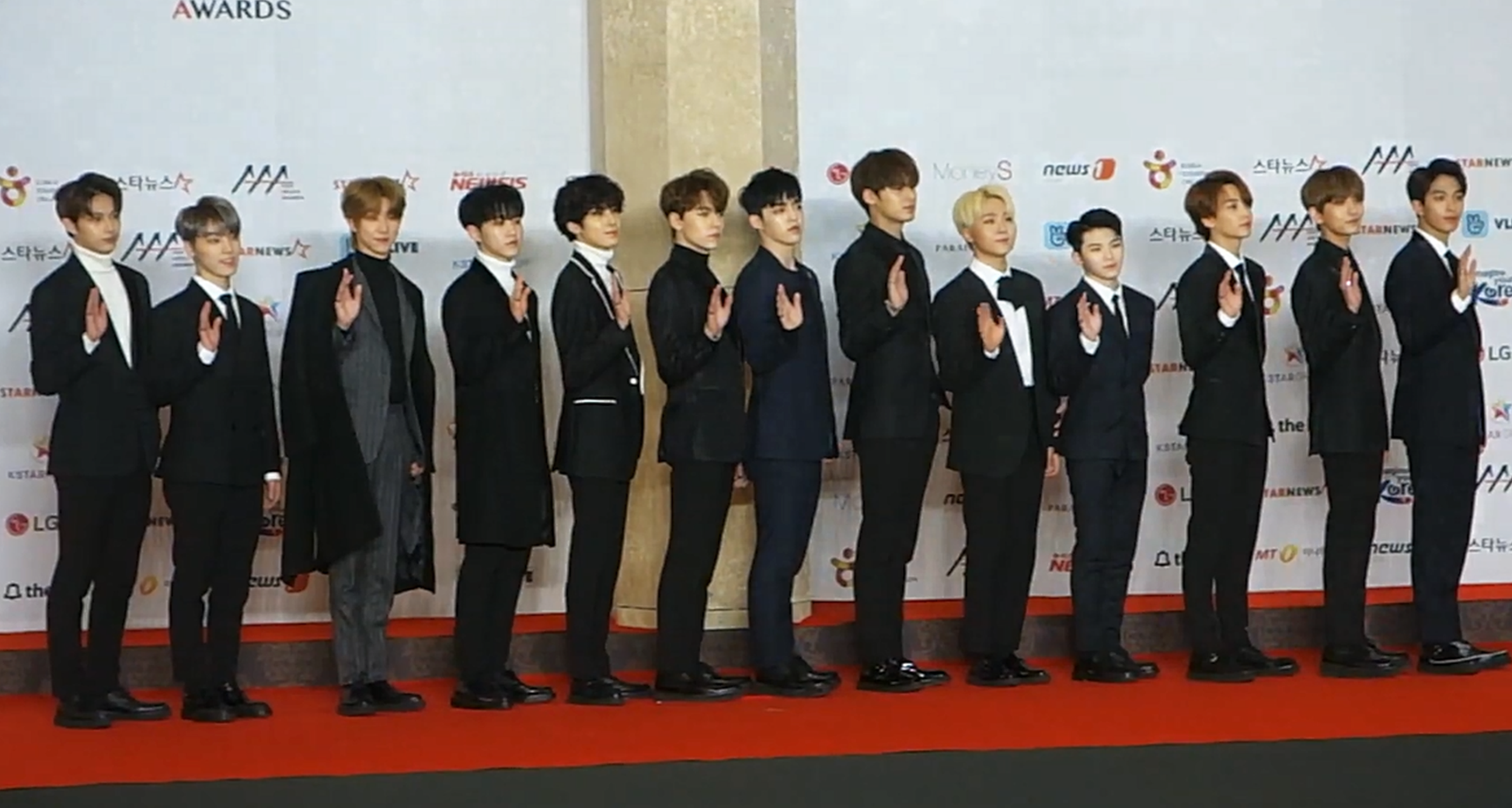
Seventeen at the 2018 Asia Artist Awards

Seventeen have won numerous awards both in South Korea and internationally. The group earned their first-ever weekly music show win on May 4, 2016, for "Pretty U" on the Show Champion. In their debut year, they won three rookie awards. They have since won a number of daesang (grand prize) and bonsang (main prize) awards from various year-end award shows. They won the Best Dance Performance Award at the MAMA Awards in 2017, 2018, 2022, and 2023. In 2023 and 2024, FML and Seventeenth Heaven garnered the group MAMA Album of the Year awards.

On October 28, 2020, Seventeen received a Prime Minister's Commendation at the Korean Popular Culture and Arts Awards, in honor for their contribution to the development of South Korea's contemporary pop culture and arts. In September 2021, the group was awarded the Minister of Culture, Sports and Tourism Award at the 2021 Newsis K-Expo Cultural Awards. Seventeen were then awarded the Presidential Commendation on October 23, 2025, at the 16th Korea Popular Culture and Arts Awards. Jeonghan and Wonwoo received the commendation on the behalf of the group while the remaining members were on their North American tour. At the time, both Jeonghan and Wonwoo were serving their mandatory military services and received permission from the relevant authorities to attend.

Seventeen was the first-ever K-pop artist featured on both MTV Push, a global campaign curated by MTV's music and talent teams in both the US and internationally, and MTV's "We Speak Music" campaign, which highlights artists who have shown the best performances on MTV under the theme of "Music as a universal language". At the 2022 MTV Video Music Awards, they were nominated for Best New Artist and Best K-Pop and won Push Performance of the Year. At the 2022 MTV Europe Music Awards, they were nominated for Best K-Pop and won Best Push Act and Best New Act.

On December 9, 2022, Seventeen, alongside Hybe Chairman Bang Si-hyuk, received the Building K-cultural Bridges: Culture Ambassador Award at the Los Angeles LA3C festival at Hammer Museum. The group was recognized for their role in cultural exchanges between Korea, Asia, and the United States. On December 30, Seventeen won the Special International Music Award at the Japan Record Awards.

== Discography ==
Studio albums

- Love & Letter (2016)
- Teen, Age (2017)
- An Ode (2019)
- Face the Sun (2022)
- Happy Burstday (2025)

== Filmography ==
=== Web series ===
- Seventeen TV (2012–2014)
- Going Seventeen (2017–present)
- Seventeen: Hit The Road (2020)
- In the Soop SVT ver. (2021)
- In the Soop SVT ver. Season 2 (2023)
- Nana Tour with Seventeen (2024)
- Nana BnB with Seventeen (2025)
- Seventeen: Our Chapter (2025)

== Concerts and tours ==
World tours

- Shining Diamonds Tour (2016)
- Diamond Edge World Tour (2017)
- Ode to You World Tour (2019–2020)
- Be The Sun World Tour (2022)
- Right Here World Tour (2024–2025)
- New World Tour (2025–2026)

Asia tours

- SVT Japan Arena Tour (2018)
- Ideal Cut Tour (2018)
- Haru Japan Tour (2019)
- Follow Tour (2023–2024)
