= Antigama =

Polish grindcore band

- Origin: Warsaw, Poland
- Genres: Grindcore, mathcore
- Years active: 2000–present
- Labels: Selfmadegod, Relapse
- Members: Lukasz Myszkowski; Paweł Jaroszewicz; Sebastian Rokicki; Sebastian Kucharski
- Past members: Macio Moretti; Michał Pietrasik; Szymon Czech; Michał "Mike" Zybert; Patryk Zwoliński; Krzysztof Bentkowski; Jose Alons; Michał Zawadzki
- Website: myspace.com/antigama

Antigama is a Polish grindcore band. The band formed in 2000. Antigama has released eight albums, four EPs, and several split records.

== History ==
Antigama formed in Warsaw in 2000 by guitarist Sebastian Rokicki and drummer Krzysztof Bentkowski, and was later joined by Lukasz Myszkowski on vocals and Macio Moretti on bass guitar. Their first full-length album, Intellect Made Us Blind, was released in early 2002 by The Flood Records. Following its release Antigama toured with multiple bands including Deformed, Pignation, and Nefas. They released multiple split EPs with bands such as Openwound and Deranged Insane. Macio Moretti left the band and was replaced by Michal Pietrasik on bass, who would later leave the band as well. The band recorded their second full-length album for Extremist Records, entitled Discomfort, which was released on 15 April 2004. Antigama performed at 2004's Obscene Extreme Music Festival in the Czech Republic.

Less than a year later Antigama recorded their third full-length studio album, entitled Zeroland, for Selfmadegod Records. Along with the release of Zeroland, Selfmadegod also re-released Discomfort with a bonus song and music video for the song "Flies". The band released more splits in 2006 and 2007 and toured different countries, making appearances at multiple festivals, including Metalmania in Katowice, Poland and the Grindcore Syndicate Tour in Germany.

The band signed with Relapse Records in May 2006. Their fourth full-length album Resonance was recorded in December of that year at studio X in Olsztyn, Poland by producer Szymon Czech. The album was released on 15 May 2007, in the U.S. and 21 May internationally. Antigama hosted a record release show in their hometown on 17 June 2007, at the Aurora Club in support of the album. The band toured again after its release and performed at the 2007 Mind Eaters Tour.

In June 2008 vocalist Lukasz Myszkowski left the band and was replaced by ex-Blindead vocalist Patryk Zwolinski. Antigama then recorded their fifth album entitled Warning, which was released by Relapse on 3 March 2009. The band was part of the first European edition of Relapse Records' Contamination Tour alongside Origin, Skinless, Obscura, and Man Must Die.

In late 2009 it was announced that Zwolinski had been replaced by previous vocalist Lukasz Myszkowski.

== Personnel ==
=== Current members ===
- Łukasz Myszkowski – vocals (2000–2008, 2009–present)
- Sebastian Rokicki – guitar (2000–present)
- Paweł "Paul" Jaroszewicz – drums (2012–present)
- Macio Moretti – bass guitar (2000–2002, 2022–present)

=== Live members ===
- Cyprian Konador – bass guitar (2013–2014)

=== Former members ===
- Krzysztof Bentkowski – drums (2000–2012)
- Michał Pietrasik – bass guitar (2002–2007)
- Szymon Czech – bass guitar (2007, 2009–2010)
- Michał "Mike" Zybert – bass guitar (2007–2008)
- Jose Alonso – bass guitar (2008–2009, 2010–2011)
- Patryk Zwoliński – vocals (2008–2009)
- Michał Zawadzki – bass guitar (2011–2014)
- Sebastian Kucharski – bass guitar (2014–2022)

== Discography ==
=== Albums ===
- Intellect Made Us Blind (The Flood Records, 2002)
- Discomfort (Extremist Records, 2004)
- Zeroland (Selfmadegod Records, 2005)
- Resonance (Relapse Records, 2007)
- Warning (Relapse Records, 2009)
- Meteor (Selfmadegod Records, 2013)
- The Insolent (Selfmadegod Records, 2015)
- Whiteout (Selfmadegod Records, 2022)

=== EPs ===
- Sweet Little Single (self-released, 2001)
- Promo Rehearsal (self-released, 2003)
- Stop the Chaos (Selfmadegod Records, 2012)
- Depressant (Selfmadegod Records, 2017)

=== Splits ===
- Siekiera / Destination Death with Jan AG (Dywizja Kot, 2003)
- Blastasfuck with Openwound (Antiself Records, 2004)
- East Clintwood / Human Shit with Deranged Insane (Mortville Records, 2004)
- The World Will Fall Soon and We All Will Die with Third Degree and Herman Rarebell (Selfmadegod Records, 2004)
- Radiation Sickness / Thirteen Stabwounds with Bastard Saints (Antiself Records, 2005)
- Roots of Chaos with Deformed (Deformeathing, 2006)
- Antigama / Drugs of Faith (Selfmadegod Records, 2007)
- Slimewave Series Vol.3 with Rot (Relapse Records, 2007)
- Pig Destroyer / Coldworker / Antigama (Relapse Records, 2007)
- Antigama / Nyia (Selfmadegod Records, 2007)
- First Kill Under a Full Moon with Anima Morte (Selfmadegod Records, 2016)

=== Compilations ===
- Antigamology (Selfmadegod Records, 2021)
