= Warnes =

Warnes may refer to:

People

- Christopher Warnes, academic
- Geoffrey Warnes, (1914–1944) RAF Squadron Leader
- Fred Warnes, (b.1915) an English professional footballer
- Ignacio Warnes, (1772–1816) an Argentine soldier
- Jennifer Warnes, (b.1947) an American singer
- Manuel Antonio Warnes, (1727–1802) Spanish soldier
- Mary Jane Warnes, (1877–1959, aka Mary Jane Fairbrother) Australian women's activist
- Reuben Charles Warnes, (1875–1961) boxing middleweight champion who participated in the 1908 Olympics
- Thomas Walter Warnes, (b.1938), English gastroenterologist
- Tim Warnes (born 1971), English children's book writer and illustrator

Locations

- Ignacio Warnes Province
- Warnes River
- Warnes (Santa Cruz), Bolivia

Miscellaneous

- Deportivo Warnes, a Bolivian football team
- Sport Boys Warnes, a Bolivian football team

== See also ==
- Warn (disambiguation)
- Warne (disambiguation)
