= Warning Tour =

2025 concert tour by Hoshi X Woozi

- Tour by Hoshi X Woozi
- Promotional poster
- Associated album: Beam
- Start date: July 11, 2025
- End date: August 24, 2025
- No. of shows: 11 in Asia
- Attendance: 100,000

The Warning Tour (stylized as Hoshi X Woozi Fan Concert Warning, in all caps) was the first concert tour by South Korean duo Hoshi X Woozi. It began on July 11 in Seoul, South Korea, and concluded on August 24 in Gwangju, South Korea, following stops in Busan, Taoyuan, and Yokohama.

== Background ==
In March 2025, Seventeen members Hoshi and Woozi paired up to release music together under the name Hoshi X Woozi. Beam was released on March 10. Later that year, the pair were added to the line up of KCON LA in August 2025.

On June 6, Pledis Entertainment announced that Hoshi X Woozi would be embarking on a concert tour in the coming two months, with shows scheduled for three cities in South Korea, with the Seoul shows livestreamed via Weverse. Further concerts were then announced for Taiwan and Japan. On June 14, Pledis announced that tickets for the opening show in Seoul had sold out during presales the day prior.

== Concert synopsis ==
The concert run time is approximately two and a half hours, including songs from Beam, "Bring It" from Teen, Age, "Echo!" from the soundtrack of World of Street Woman Fighter and an unreleased song titled "Copy and Paste". Each member performed a solo stage, with Hoshi performing "Spider" and "Touch", and Woozi performing "Ruby" and "Simple". The encore portion of the concert included a medley of Seventeen songs including "Super", "Hot", "Cheers" and "F*ck My Life". During the final performance in Seoul, various members of Seventeen made surprise appearances to join the Seventeen song medley.

== Tour dates ==
Key
‡	Indicates performances streamed simultaneously on Weverse Concerts

List of concerts, showing event names, dates, cities, countries, venues and attendance
Date (2025)	City	Country	Venue	Attendance	Ref.
July 11 ‡	Seoul	South Korea	Jamsil Indoor Stadium	17,000	
July 12 ‡	Seoul	South Korea	Jamsil Indoor Stadium	17,000	
July 13 ‡	Seoul	South Korea	Jamsil Indoor Stadium	17,000	
July 19	Busan	South Korea	Busan Sajik Gymnasium	83,000	
July 20	Busan	South Korea	Busan Sajik Gymnasium	83,000	
July 26	Taoyuan	Taiwan	NTSU Arena	83,000	
July 27	Taoyuan	Taiwan	NTSU Arena	83,000	
August 6	Yokohama	Japan	K-Arena Yokohama	83,000	
August 7	Yokohama	Japan	K-Arena Yokohama	83,000	
August 23	Gwangju	South Korea	Gwangju Women's University Universiade Gymnasium	83,000	
August 24	Gwangju	South Korea	Gwangju Women's University Universiade Gymnasium	83,000	
Total				100,000	

== See also ==
- List of Seventeen live performances
