= Warn =

Warn or WARN may refer to:

== Enterprises and organizations ==
- WARN (FM), a radio station (91.5 FM) licensed to Culpeper, Virginia, United States
- Warn Industries, US company manufacturing off-road vehicle accessories and recovery equipment
- Western Animal Rights Network, or WARN, a coalition for animal rights groups in the West of England and South Wales
- Women of All Red Nations, or WARN, a Native American women's organization founded in 1974

== Legislation ==
- Warning, Alert and Response Network Act, or WARN, a U.S. legislation
- Worker Adjustment and Retraining Notification Act, or WARN, a U.S. legislation

== People ==
- Warn (surname)

== See also ==
- Warne (disambiguation)
- Warnes (disambiguation)
- Warning (disambiguation)
