= Hoshi X Woozi =

South Korean musical duo

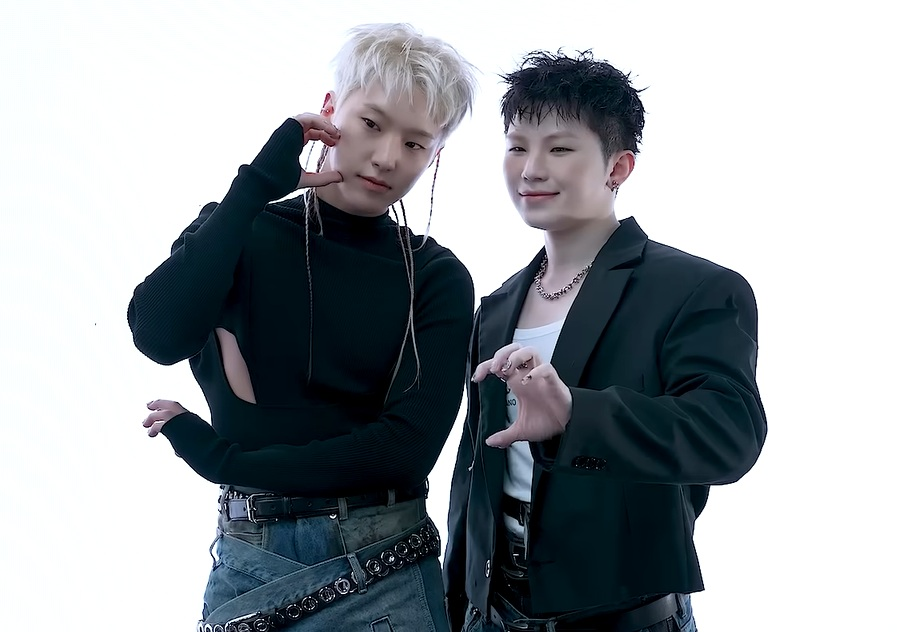
- Hoshi and Woozi in 2025

Background information
- Also known as: HxW
- Origin: Seoul, South Korea
- Genre: K-pop
- Years active: 2017; 2025
- Label: Pledis
- Spinoff of: Seventeen
- Members: Hoshi; Woozi

Hoshi X Woozi (Korean: 호시 X 우지; also known as HxW) is the third sub-unit of South Korean boy band Seventeen, after BSS and JxW. Formed by Pledis Entertainment in 2025, the duo consists of members Hoshi and Woozi. Initially formed in 2017 with the release of "Bring It" from the album Teen, Age, they officially debuted on March 10, 2025, with the single album Beam.

== History ==
=== 2017: Formation with "Bring It" ===
Hoshi and Woozi first released music together in 2017 with "Bring It" (날 쏘고 가라; Nal ssogo gara; lit. 'Shoot Me and Go'), a b-side song from Teen, Age, an album consisting of tracks performed by various combinations of Seventeen members. The song debuted and peaked at 95 on South Korea's Gaon Chart. It was performed live throughout Seventeen's Ideal Cut Tour and at the 2018 Mnet Asian Music Awards in Hong Kong.

=== 2025–present: Beam and Warning Tour ===
On December 25, 2024, Pledis Entertainment confirmed that Hoshi and Woozi would comprise the next sub-unit to debut from Seventeen. On February 19, 2025, Pledis revealed the name of the pair's debut single album Beam, which was released March 10, alongside its lead single "96ers". The album includes a collaboration with So!YoON!.

On April 30, the duo was added to the lineup of KCON LA 2025, scheduled for August 1–3. On June 4, Pledis announced that the pair would be hosting the Warning Tour, with seven shows across three cities in South Korea scheduled for July and August. Additional stops were added in Taoyuan, Taiwan, and Yokohama, Japan, on June 9. On June 10, Hoshi X Woozi released "Echo!" for the soundtrack of World of Street Woman Fighter.

Both Hoshi and Woozi are set to commence their mandatory military services in the South Korean military in September 2025, putting Hoshi X Woozi activities on hold after the Warning Tour.

== Discography ==
=== Single albums ===
List of single albums, showing selected details, selected chart positions and sales figures
Title	Details	Peak chart positions		Sales
Title	Details	KOR	JPN	Sales
Beam	Released: March 10, 2025; Label: Pledis; Formats: CD, digital download, streaming	2	3	KOR: 461,902; JPN: 46,798

=== Singles ===
List of singles, showing year released, selected chart positions, and name of the album
Title	Year	Peak chart position	Album
Title	Year	KOR	Album
"96ers" (동갑내기)	2025	17	Beam

=== Soundtrack appearances ===
List of soundtrack appearances, showing year released, selected chart positions, and name of the album
Title	Year	Peak chart position	Album
Title	Year	KOR	Album
"Echo!"	2025	159	World of Street Woman Fighter OST

=== Other charted songs ===
List of singles, showing year released, selected chart positions, and name of the album
Title	Year	Peak chart position		Sales	Album
Title	Year	KOR	JPN Hot	Sales	Album
"Bring It" (날 쏘고 가라)	2017	95	—	KOR: 22,016	Teen, Age
"Pinocchio" (featuring So!YoON!)	2025	— (Note: "Pinocchio" did not enter the Circle Digital Chart, but peaked at number 16 on the component Download Chart.)	11	—N/a	Beam
"Stupid Idiot"	2025	— (Note: "Stupid Idiot" did not enter the Circle Digital Chart, but peaked at number 13 on the component Download Chart.)	—	—N/a	Beam
"—" denotes releases that did not chart or were not released in that region.

== Live performances ==
=== Concert tours ===
- Warning Tour (2025)

=== Festivals ===
List of festival performances, showing date, event, location and performed song(s)
Date	Event	City	Country	Performed song(s)	Ref.
August 3, 2025	KCON	Los Angeles	United States	"Bring It"; "96ers"; "Echo!"; "Stupid Idiot"	

=== TV performances ===
List of TV performances, showing date, event, location and performed song(s)
Date	Event	City	Country	Performed song(s)	Ref.
March 13, 2025	M Countdown	Seoul	South Korea	"96ers"; "Stupid Idiot"	
March 14, 2025	Music Bank	Seoul	South Korea	"96ers"; "Stupid Idiot"	
March 15, 2025	Show! Music Core	Seoul	South Korea	"96ers"; "Stupid Idiot"	
March 16, 2025	Inkigayo	Seoul	South Korea	"96ers"; "Stupid Idiot"	
