= Happy Ending (Seventeen song) =

2019 Japanese single by Seventeen

- Standard cover

Single by Seventeen

from the album Always Yours
- Language: Japanese
- B-side: "Oh My!" and "Healing" (Japanese versions)
- Released: May 29, 2019
- Genre: J-pop
- Length: 3:31
- Label: Pledis Japan

Seventeen singles chronology
"Home" (2019)	"Happy Ending" (2019)	"Hit" (2019)

Seventeen Japanese singles chronology
"Call Call Call!" (2018)	"Happy Ending" (2019)	"Fallin' Flower" (2020)

Music video
- "Happy Ending" on YouTube

"Happy Ending" is a song recorded by South Korean boy group Seventeen. It was released on May 29, 2019, Pledis Japan, as the group's first non-album and second overall Japanese single. The track debuted at number two on the Oricon Singles Chart.

== Background and release ==
"Happy Ending" was announced in March 2019 as Seventeen's second Japanese language release, one year after their EP We Make You. The single was released on May 29, 2019, with two b-side tracks; the Japanese versions of "Oh My!" and "Healing". To commemorate the release, the group held four shows in two cities in Japan.

A Korean-language version of the song was released by the group later that year in An Ode, Seventeen's third studio album.

== Track listing ==
Happy Ending track listing
No.	Title	Lyrics	Music	Length
1.	"Happy Ending"	Woozi; Bumzu	Bumzu; Anchor	3:31
2.	"Oh My!" (Japanese version)	Woozi; Bumzu; S.Coups; Vernon	Bumzu; Park Ki-tae	3:16
3.	"Healing" (Japanese version)	Woozi; S.Coups; Mingyu; Vernon	Won Young Heon; Noh Hyun	3:25
Total length:				10:12

== Charts ==
Weekly chart performance for "Happy Ending"
Chart (2019)	Peak position
Japan (Japan Hot 100)	2
Japan Combined Singles (Oricon)	2
South Korea (Gaon)	196

== Certifications ==
Certifications and sales for "Happy Ending"
Region	Certification	Certified units/sales
Japan (RIAJ)	2× Platinum	500,000^{^}
^{^} Shipments figures based on certification alone.
