= Fallin' Flower =

2020 Japanese single by Seventeen

- Standard cover

Single by Seventeen

from the album Always Yours
- Language: Japanese
- Released: April 1, 2020
- Genre: J-pop
- Length: 3:34
- Label: Pledis Japan
- Composers: Woozi; Bumzu; Park Ki-tae
- Lyricists: Woozi; Bumzu; Dino

Seventeen singles chronology
"Fear" (2019)	"Fallin' Flower" (2020)	"Left & Right" (2020)

Seventeen Japanese singles chronology
"Happy Ending" (2019)	"Fallin' Flower" (2020)	"24H" (2020)

Music video
- "Fallin' Flower" on YouTube

"Fallin' Flower" (Japanese: 舞い落ちる花びら, Hepburn: Mai Ochiru Hanabira; lit. 'Falling petals') is a song recorded by South Korean boy group Seventeen. It was released on April 1, 2020, through Pledis Japan, as the group's second non-album and third overall Japanese single. The track debuted at number one on the Oricon Singles Chart, becoming the group's first song to top the chart.

== Background and release ==
In January 2020, Seventeen announced that they would be releasing their second Japanese single "Fallin' Flower" on April 1, 2020. The CD single includes "Fallin' Flower", as well as the Japanese versions of the group's Korean tracks "Good to Me" and "Smile Flower". It was marketed with four versions: Limited Edition A and Limited Edition B, which each contains a unique 36-page photobook; Limited Edition C, which features a behind-the-scenes blu-ray of the song's music video; and the Carat Edition, which includes a behind-the-scenes blu-ray of the album jacket photoshoot and a message from the group to their fans.

A Korean-language version of the song was released by the group in 2022 for Sector 17, the reissue of their album Face the Sun.

== Composition ==
"Fallin' Flower" was conceptualized as a "spring-themed song" centered around the motif of flowers, as encapsulated by the line "I am a flower" (私は花; Watashi wa hana) in the chorus. Embodying hope, the track has been noted to convey the message: "Even when flowers fall, it is not the end but a new beginning".

The song was produced by Park Ki-tae, Bumzu, and Woozi, while its lyrics were written by Bumzu and Woozi.

== Music video ==
The music video premiered ahead of the song's release date on March 24, 2020. Thematically centered on the concept of flowers, the video features Seventeen performing choreography across different sets before ending with a scene of the group surrounded by delicately falling petals as they stand on a large florally decorated stage.

== Promotion ==
"Fallin' Flower" was selected as the opening track for the nationwide broadcast of TV Asahi's Break Out for the month of April and as the ending theme for the network's program Hikakuteki Fan Desu! (ひかくてきファンです！) from April to June. On May 23, 2020, a new performance video of "Fallin' Flower" was featured on Fuji TV's Love Music program. Seventeen also scheduled individual and group handshake events in Chiba, Fukuoka, and Osaka; fan participation was decided via lottery system for those who purchased the single.

== Commercial performance ==
In Japan, "Fallin' Flower" debuted at number one on the Billboard Japan Hot 100 chart in its opening week of March 30 to April 5, 2020, recording 425,873 copies sold on the chart. It debuted at number one on the Oricon Singles Chart on the same week, becoming Seventeen's first song to top the chart. Within a day of its release, the single recorded 230,000 copies sold on Oricon, more than double the sales of the group's previous Japanese single "Happy Ending". After one week, the single sold over 334,000 copies. This achievement, alongside the sales of "Happy Ending", marked the first time a foreign artist has had two consecutive singles each exceed a sales total of 200,000 units sold in its first week, starting with their first released single. Following BTS, Seventeen also became the second foreign artist in history to have a single surpass 300,000 copies in sales within its first week of release. At the end of 2020, "Fallin' Flower" became the only song performed by a K-pop artist to rank in the top 10 of Billboard Japan's Year-End Single Sales Chart.

== Track listing ==
Fallin' Flower track listing
No.	Title	Lyrics	Music	Length
1.	"Fallin' Flower" (舞い落ちる花びら)	Bumzu; Woozi	Park Ki-Tae; Bumzu; Woozi	3:32
2.	"Good to Me" (Japanese version)	Bumzu; Woozi	Bumzu; Woozi	3:11
3.	"Smile Flower" (Japanese version)	Woozi	Woozi; Dong Nehyeong; Won Yeongheon; Yama Art; Woozi	3:52
Total length:				10:36

== Charts ==
=== Weekly charts ===
Weekly chart performance for "Fallin' Flower"
Chart (2020)	Peak position
Japan (Japan Hot 100)	1
Japan Combined Singles (Oricon)	1
Japan Singles (Oricon)	1
US World Digital Song Sales (Billboard)	21

=== Monthly charts ===
Monthly chart performance for "Fallin' Flower"
Chart (2020)	Peak position
Japan Singles (Oricon)	3

=== Year-end charts ===
Year-end chart performance for "Fallin' Flower"
Chart (2020)	Position
Japan (Japan Hot 100)	77
Japan Singles (Oricon)	11

== Certifications ==
Certifications and sales for "Fallin' Flower"
Region	Certification	Certified units/sales
Japan (RIAJ)	2× Platinum	500,000^{^}
Streaming
Japan (RIAJ)	Gold	50,000,000^{†}
^{^} Shipments figures based on certification alone.^{†} Streaming-only figures based on certification alone.
