= Beam (single album) =

- Digital cover

Single album by Hoshi X Woozi
- Released: March 10, 2025
- Length: 7:02
- Language: Korean; English
- Label: Pledis; YG Plus

Singles from Beam
- 1. "96ers" Released: March 10, 2025

Beam is the debut single album by Hoshi X Woozi, (Note: Also referred to as HxW.) a sub-unit of the South Korean boy band Seventeen. It was released on March 10, 2025, alongside its lead single "96ers".

== Background and release ==
On February 19, 2025, Pledis Entertainment announced a new Seventeen sub-unit comprising group members Hoshi and Woozi via a logo trailer, revealing that the pair would be debuting with a single album titled Beam. Promotional content for the album was released daily from February 26 onwards, with content released at 9:06 AM KST, a reference to the two members being born in 1996.

The track list was released on March 1, revealing Beam's lead single "96ers", as well as outlining the credits for the EP's three songs. A teaser trailer was released on March 4 featuring a snippet of "Pinocchio" against visuals of intense silhouetted dancing controlled by a hand. Two teasers for the lead single's music video were released on March 8 and 9.

The album was released on March 10, alongside the music video for "96ers". Two days later, a video was released for "Stupid Idiot".

== Promotion ==
Hoshi and Woozi hosted a fan event on March 16 at the CG Art Hall in Seoul to commemorate the album. The two hour event included performances, a Q&A session and behind the scenes insights on the creation of the album. A special photo booth frame was released with South Korean photo booth company Life4Cuts.

== Track listing ==
Beam track listing
No.	Title	Lyrics	Music	Length
1.	"Pinocchio" (featuring So!Yoon!)	Woozi; Bumzu; Hoshi; Jintae Ko; David Brook; Jimmy Burney	Woozi; Bumzu (Note: Also credited for arrangement.); BuildingOwner	1:46
2.	"96ers" (동갑내기; Dong-gabnaegi; lit. Same Age)	Woozi; Bumzu; Hoshi	Woozi; Bumzu; Hoshi; Cesar Peralta; Ollipop; Ryan Lawrie; Benji Bae; Andreas Öberg; Christoffer Jonsson; Jake K	2:45
3.	"Stupid Idiot"	Woozi; Bumzu; Hoshi; Pink Slip	Woozi; Bumzu; Hoshi; Pink Slip	2:31
Total length:				7:02

== Charts ==
=== Weekly charts ===
Weekly chart performance for Beam
Chart (2025)	Peak position
Japan (Oricon)	3
Japan Combined Singles (Oricon)	3
Japan Top Singles Sales (Billboard Japan)	3
Portuguese Albums (AFP) + (Plus) version	119
South Korean Albums (Circle)	2

=== Monthly charts ===
Monthly chart performance for Beam
Chart (2025)	Position
Japan (Oricon)	11
South Korean Albums (Circle)	6

=== Year-end charts ===
Year-end chart performance for Beam
Chart (2025)	Position
South Korean Albums (Circle)	61

== Certifications ==
Certifications for Beam
Region	Certification	Certified units/sales
South Korea (KMCA)	Platinum	250,000^{^}
^{^} Shipments figures based on certification alone.

== Release history ==
Release history for Beam
Region	Date	Format	Label	Ref.
Various	March 10, 2025	Digital download; streaming	Pledis; YG Plus	
South Korea	March 10, 2025	CD; Weverse album; Kit	Pledis; YG Plus	
Japan	March 12, 2025	CD; Weverse album; Kit	Pledis Japan; Hybe Japan	
United States	March 14, 2025	CD	Pledis; YG Plus	
