= Resonance (Antigama album) =

Studio album by Antigama
- Released: 15 May 2007
- Recorded: 2006
- Genre: Grindcore, mathcore
- Length: 32:30
- Label: Relapse

Antigama chronology
Zeroland (2005)	Resonance (2007)	Pig Destroyer / Coldworker / Antigama (2007)

Professional ratings
Review scores
Source	Rating
Allmusic	3.5/5 stars
Asice e-zine	3.5/5 stars
Metal Injection	9/10 stars
Metal Rage	8.5/10 stars

Resonance is the fourth full-length studio album by Polish grindcore band Antigama. It was released on 15 May 2007 by Relapse Records.

== Overview ==
Resonance was recorded in December 2006 at Studio X in Olsztyn, Poland, with producer Szymon Czech. The album was released on 15 May 2007 in the US and 21 May internationally. Antigama hosted a record release show in their hometown on 17 June 2007 at the Aurora Club, in support of the album.

== Track listing ==
1. "Pursuit" – 1:16
2. "Seismic Report" – 0:59
3. "Ecstasy" – 1:21
4. "Neutral Balance" – 1:13
5. "Order" – 2:16
6. "Pending" – 1:57
7. "Remembering Nothing" – 1:17
8. "Barbapapex" – 2:29
9. "Psychonaut" – 3:57
10. "No" – 1:34
11. "After" – 1:46
12. "By and By" – 2:30
13. "Shymrok" – 0:53
14. "Types of Waste" – 1:44
15. "Asylum" – 1:45
16. "Unreachable" – 1:43
17. "Stars" – 3:50

== Personnel ==
- Łukasz Myszkowski – vocals
- Sebastian Rokicki – guitar
- Michal Pietrasik – bass
- Krzysztof Bentkowski – drums
