= The Warning (2015 film) =

- Theatrical release poster
- Directed by: Dirk Hagen
- Written by: Summer Moore
- Produced by: Summer Moore
- Starring: Summer Moore; Jeff Allen; Tiffany Joy Williams
- Cinematography: Chris Warren
- Music by: Nick Di Felice
- Production companies: Happy Day Productions, LLC
- Distributed by: XVII Entertainment & Film Canal
- Release date: March 2015
- Running time: 91 minutes
- Country: United States
- Language: English

The Warning is a 2015 American horror and thriller film directed by Dirk Hagen, written by Summer Moore, and starring Moore, Jeff Allen, and Tiffany Joy Williams. The film is a found footage satire film based on true accounts of the Satanic Panic in the 1980s-1990s, that is filmed in the "Devil Worshipping Capital of the Western World" Manitou Springs, Colorado.

== Plot ==
The 'Satanic Panic' occurred in the United States in the 1980s and 1990s. Parents were stricken with fear that their children would fall into the hands of Satan, and begin his worship.

In the fall of 2011, a major television network's new series, Investigating Urban Legends, began filming its first episode, set to air in the coming months. A fresh reporter, Taylor Skye (the shows Small Town Legends segment reporter), was sent out on location to Manitou Springs, Colorado. She was to interview local townspeople about the legend behind the town being labeled 'The Devil Worshipping Capital of the Western World.'

Taylor was hired because she grew up near the small town. She hired a couple of her high school friends to help her with her debut on national television. Uncovering stories that lead to the possibility that satanic worship might still be occurring in the small town, lead Taylor to want to go deeper, and risk entering the possible gateway of Satanic worship in the town.

Recording each step of their journey on multiple cameras, the threesome documented numerous possible satanic sites and sacrifices. However, on the last night of their discoveries in the wilderness, they uncovered something that was meant to be kept hidden. Every step of their chilling discovery is documented on camera, until the end. An end that has led to them being labeled as missing, the network canceling the show, and the deceitful cover up by the network that the story ever took place.

== Cast ==
- Summer Moore as Taylor Skye
- Jeff Allen as Brad
- Tiffany Williams as Angel
- Christina Pascucci as Herself
- Lyle DeRose as Alien Man
- Aeon Cruz as Sam
- Pleasant Wayne as Girl (Voice)
- Ashley M. Kalfas as Jamie
- Karl Brevik as Lurker
- Mary Ann Hogan as Scary Interviewee
- Sonja Cimone as Girl
- Bob Hurst as Tennessee Jack
- Stefanie Smith as Stephanie
- Jamie Demeter as Beth
- Grant Benjamin Leibowitz as Colby
- Bill George Wright as Satanist

== Production ==
The Warning was shot in Colorado in 2014. Writer Summer Moore was inspired after growing up in the area and hearing the local legends of satanic worship taking place. She set the film in 2011 because the film was to be marketed as really having transpired, thus they did not have the ability to cast well-known named actors.

== Release ==
Amazon released it on DVD in March 2015. iTunes, Google Play, Xbox, Vudu, and many other Video on Demand platforms released the movie in March 2015.

The film's Hollywood, California industry premiere was April 8, 2015 at The Downtown Independent and its public premiere was May 28, 2015 at the University of Southern California (where Moore is an alumni.

== Film festivals ==
The Warning was selected into the Action On Film International Film Festival in 2015.
