= Fair Warning =

Fair Warning may refer to:

== Music ==
- "Fair Warning", a 1975 song by Todd Rundgren from Initiation
- Fair Warning (Van Halen album), a 1981 album by Van Halen
- Fair Warning (band), a German hard rock band founded in 1991
- Fair Warning (Fair Warning album), a 1992 album by Fair Warning
- Fair Warning, a 2014 album by The Rails

== Other media ==
- Fair Warning (1931 film), a 1931 American film starring George O'Brien
- Fair Warning (1937 film), a 1937 American mystery film
- "Fair Warning" (The Twilight Zone), an episode of the 2002 revival of The Twilight Zone
- Fair Warning, a 2002 novel by Robert Olen Butler, or the 2001 short story expanded for the novel
- Fair Warning, a 2020 novel by Michael Connelly

== See also ==
- Warning (disambiguation)
