= Peter Warne =

Peter Warne may refer to:

- Peter Warne, a character played by Clark Gable in the 1934 film It Happened One Night
- Peter Warne, a character played by Jack Lemmon in the 1956 remake You Can't Run Away from It
- Peter Warne, alternate name of British songwriter Michael Julien
