= 2020 Japan Dome Tour =

Cancelled 2020 concert tour by Seventeen

- Cancelled Dome tour by Seventeen
- Location: Japan
- Start date: May 9, 2020 (scheduled)
- End date: May 28, 2020 (scheduled)
- No. of shows: 8 (all cancelled)
- Website: www.seventeen-17.jp/statics/2020_dome_tour

Seventeen concert chronology
- Ode to You World Tour (2019–2020); 2020 Japan Dome Tour (2020; cancelled); In-Complete (2021)

The 2020 Japan Dome Tour (stylized as SEVENTEEN 2020 JAPAN DOME TOUR <SVT>) was a planned concert tour by South Korean boy band Seventeen that was cancelled due to the COVID-19 pandemic. It was intended to be the group's first dome tour in Japan. The tour was announced on November 11, 2019, two days after Seventeen completed the Japanese leg of their Ode to You World Tour.

Initially scheduled as five concerts at Tokyo Dome, Fukuoka PayPay Dome and Kyocera Dome Osaka, the tour was expanded in February 2020 with three additional concerts, including two at MetLife Dome. The expanded itinerary comprised eight concerts at four dome venues between May 9 and 28 and was expected to attract more than 350,000 people. Tickets for the five originally announced concerts sold out after general sales opened on March 8, while general sales for the three additional concerts were scheduled to begin on April 19.

On April 8, 2020 approximately one month before the scheduled opening concert, all eight shows were cancelled. The organizers stated that postponement had been considered, but that uncertainty over when the concerts could safely be held led to the decision to cancel the tour. Seventeen eventually held their first dome tour in Japan in November and December 2022 as the Japanese leg of the Be the Sun World Tour.

== Background ==
In 2019, Seventeen toured Japan twice, with the Haru Japan Tour in the spring and the Japanese leg of the Ode to You World Tour in the autumn. The two concert runs attracted a combined audience of 330,000, and tickets for both sold out on the day of their respective general releases. Following the final Japanese concert of the Ode to You tour on November 9, a countdown to the time of an upcoming announcement appeared onstage. When the countdown ended on November 11, Seventeen announced plans for their first dome tour in Japan.

The initial itinerary comprised five concerts: two at Tokyo Dome on May 19 and 20, one at Fukuoka PayPay Dome on May 23, and two at Kyocera Dome Osaka on May 27 and 28, 2020. On February 3, three additional concerts were announced: two at MetLife Dome on May 9 and 10 and a second Fukuoka concert on May 24. The additions expanded the itinerary to eight concerts at four dome venues, with two performances at each venue, and moved the opening date forward to May 9. The expanded tour was expected to attract more than 350,000 people. The tour's official title, SEVENTEEN 2020 JAPAN DOME TOUR <SVT>, was announced on February 12.

On February 9, as the COVID-19 pandemic spread internationally, Pledis Entertainment cancelled the remaining February and March dates of the Ode to You World Tour. The cancelled concerts comprised shows in Kuala Lumpur and Taipei and all four dates of the planned European leg in Madrid, Paris, London and Berlin. The Japan Dome Tour initially remained scheduled. General sales for its five originally announced concerts began on March 8 and sold out, while general sales for the three additional concerts were scheduled to begin on April 19.

=== Related release ===
Ahead of the tour, Seventeen released their second Japanese single, "Fallin' Flower", on April 1, 2020. The group's Japanese website promoted the single in connection with the upcoming dome tour, describing the title track as a new song expected to attract attention during the concerts.

=== Cancellation ===
On April 8, approximately one month before the scheduled opening concert, the organizers announced the cancellation of all eight shows. They cited the safety of the audience, artists and staff, as well as efforts to prevent further transmission of COVID-19. The organizers stated that postponement had been considered, but that the difficulty of predicting when the concerts could safely be held led to the decision to cancel the tour.

== Merchandise ==
Although the tour was cancelled, merchandise that had been produced for the concerts was sold through advance and general reservation sales. The organizers stated that the goods would be made available as commemorative items for fans.

Official merchandise was released in three waves beginning in April 2020. The first collection included uchiwa fans, towels, clothing, bags, accessories and the group's official light stick, while the second consisted of trading cards. The third collection included merchandise that had originally been planned for sale exclusively at the concert venues, including venue-specific dome commemorative charms.

== Cancelled shows ==
Tickets for the five originally announced concerts sold out after general sales opened on March 8, while general sales for the three additional concerts were scheduled to begin on April 19. All eight scheduled concerts were subsequently cancelled due to the COVID-19 pandemic.

List of cancelled concerts, showing dates, cities, country, venues, notes and references
Date (2020)	City	Country	Venue	Notes	Ref.
May 9	Tokorozawa	Japan	MetLife Dome	Additional show (Note: General sales for the three additional concerts were scheduled to begin on April 19, 2020. The tour was cancelled on April 8, before the general sale took place.)	
May 10	Tokorozawa	Japan	MetLife Dome	Additional show	
May 19	Tokyo	Japan	Tokyo Dome	Sold out	
May 20	Tokyo	Japan	Tokyo Dome	Sold out	
May 23	Fukuoka	Japan	Fukuoka PayPay Dome	Sold out	
May 24	Fukuoka	Japan	Fukuoka PayPay Dome	Additional show	
May 27	Osaka	Japan	Kyocera Dome Osaka	Sold out	
May 28	Osaka	Japan	Kyocera Dome Osaka	Sold out	

== See also ==
- List of Seventeen live performances
