= Power of Love (concert) =

Online concert by Seventeen

- Online concert by Seventeen
- Location: Seoul, South Korea
- Venue: KSPO Dome
- Associated albums: Your Choice; Attacca
- Start date: November 14, 2021
- End date: November 21, 2021
- No. of shows: 3

Seventeen concert chronology
- In-Complete (2021); Power of Love (2021); Be The Sun Tour (2022)

Power of Love (stylized in all caps 2021 Seventeen Concert Power of Love) was a series of three online concerts by South Korean boy band Seventeen. Staged at KSPO Dome in Seoul, the concerts were livestreamed worldwide through VenewLive from November 14 to 21, 2021, with streaming passes sold through Weverse Shop. The series comprised the Power edition on November 14, the Japan Edition on November 18 and the Love edition on November 21, with each performance featuring different staging and selections.

The concerts formed part of Seventeen's 2021 Power of 'Love' project and featured material from the group's extended plays Your Choice and Attacca. The Japan Edition incorporated Japanese-language versions of the group's songs and premiered their then-unreleased Japanese single "Power of Love". Although the concerts were initially planned to include an in-person audience, the offline component was cancelled because of restrictions imposed during the COVID-19 pandemic. were absent from the live stage performances while undertaking activities in China that had been postponed due to the COVID-19 pandemic, but joined the other members through video calls; prerecorded footage of the pair was also incorporated into the performance of "Network Love" alongside Joshua and Vernon. Concert footage was subsequently combined with interviews and documentary material for Seventeen's first concert film, Seventeen Power of Love: The Movie. The film was released in cinemas worldwide beginning on April 20, 2022, and grossed $2.82 million in reported markets.

== Background ==
The COVID-19 pandemic disrupted Seventeen's concert plans in 2020. The remaining dates of their Ode to You World Tour were cancelled in February, followed in April by the cancellation of SEVENTEEN 2020 JAPAN DOME TOUR <SVT>. Intended to be the group's first Japanese dome tour, the latter had been scheduled for eight sold-out concerts across four cities from May 9 to 28 and was expected to attract more than 350,000 attendees.

With in-person touring suspended, Seventeen moved their major concert and fan-meeting activities online. Their first solo concert of 2021, In-Complete, was livestreamed on January 23 and viewed from 122 regions worldwide. Power of Love, held approximately ten months later, continued the group's use of online concerts during the pandemic.

In May 2021, Seventeen launched the Power of 'Love' project, which explored different forms and stages of love. It began with Wonwoo and Mingyu's digital single "Bittersweet", followed by the extended plays Your Choice in June and Attacca in October. Conceived as an extension of the project, the concerts incorporated songs from both EPs and earlier releases into programs organized around the themes of power and love. The Japanese single "Power of Love", first performed during the Japan Edition and released on December 8, served as the project's conclusion.

Seventeen initially considered holding the concerts before an in-person audience at KSPO Dome. Pledis Entertainment instead changed them to online-only performances under the first-stage guidelines of the South Korean government's gradual reopening plan. Under the guidelines then proposed, unrestricted non-regular performances—including most popular-music concerts—would not be permitted until the country entered the second stage of the plan.

The final program comprised the Power edition on November 14, the Japan Edition on November 18 and the Love edition on November 21. The Power and Love concerts featured different portions of their set lists and stage production, with three stage areas that changed according to the songs' concepts. The program also included newly released material, previously unperformed songs, special arrangements and unreleased solo songs. The Japan Edition was developed for the group's Japanese audience and included Japanese-language versions of their songs and the premiere of "Power of Love".

Tickets were sold through Weverse Shop, and the three concerts were livestreamed through VenewLive. The Power and Love broadcasts were offered as either a single main-camera feed or a four-screen multiview comprising the main feed and three concept-camera feeds; delayed single-view broadcasts were also provided to ticket holders.

=== Member participation ===
Jun and The8 did not perform live from Seoul during the concerts. Pledis Entertainment had announced that the two would remain in China from September through December to resume activities postponed by the pandemic and spend time with their families, citing international travel restrictions and quarantine requirements. The remaining eleven members performed onstage, while Jun and The8 participated remotely through live video calls and prerecorded footage, including the performance of "Network Love".

== Concert synopsis ==
The concerts opened with a video showing a locked door and a representation of Seventeen's logo crashing through a wall. The eleven members present in Seoul then appeared for "Crush" and "Anyone", followed by a rock arrangement of "Clap", introduced by an electric-guitar solo from Woozi. After the opening remarks, Jun and The8 joined the group through a video call. The concert continued with "Ready to Love", a rearranged version of "Crazy in Love", and "Network Love", which incorporated prerecorded footage of Jun and The8 performing with Joshua and Vernon. "Fast Pace" led into Wonwoo and Mingyu's duet "Bittersweet", followed by "I Wish" and "Home".

The middle portion differed according to each edition's theme. The Power performance emphasized more forceful material, beginning with "Hit". The hip-hop unit performed "Check-In" and "Gam3 Bo1", while Dino presented the unreleased solo song "Last Order". The vocal unit performed "Pinwheel" and "Imperfect Love", followed by Hoshi's "Spider", which featured an additional dance break. The section concluded with "Fear". By contrast, the Love edition used lighter and more sentimental selections, including "Snap Shoot", introduced with a school-choir arrangement, and "Oh My!". Its unit and solo stages comprised "Same Dream, Same Mind, Same Night", "Imperfect Love", Dino's unreleased "Zero (Hero)", the hip-hop unit's "If I" and "I Can't Run Away", and Hoshi's tiger-themed solo performance of "Tiger Power".

The Japan Edition incorporated Japanese-language versions of "Home", "20", "Chilli" and "Snap Shoot", alongside the group's Japanese single "Not Alone". Seventeen also gave the first performance of their then-unreleased Japanese single "Ainochikara", which served as the conclusion to their 2021 Power of 'Love' project.

All three editions returned to full-group stages for "My My", "Heaven's Cloud", "Beautiful" and "Rock with You". In the Power and Love editions, the encore consisted of "To You", "Thinkin' About You", "Left & Right" and "All My Love"; the Japan Edition used "Ainochikara" in place of "To You". The members delivered individual closing remarks during the encore and expressed their hope that it would be their final concert held without an in-person audience.

== Performances ==
List of performances, showing dates, editions, start times and streaming platform
Date (2021)	Edition	Start time	Streaming platform
November 14	Power	5:00 p.m. KST	VenewLive
November 18	Japan Edition	6:00 p.m. KST/JST	VenewLive
November 21	Love	5:00 p.m. KST	VenewLive

== Set lists ==
Each edition featured a 26-song set list, with different solo and unit stages. The song orders are adapted from the concerts' official home-video track listings.

=== Power ===
November 14, 2021

1. "Crush"
2. "Anyone"
3. "Clap"
4. "Ready to Love"
5. "Crazy in Love"
6. "Network Love"
7. "Fast Pace"
8. "Bittersweet" (Wonwoo and Mingyu)
9. "I Wish"
10. "Home"
11. "Hit"
12. "Check-In" (hip-hop unit)
13. "Gam3 Bo1" (hip-hop unit)
14. "Last Order" (Dino)
15. "Pinwheel" (vocal unit)
16. "Imperfect Love" (vocal unit)
17. "Spider" (Hoshi)
18. "Fear"
19. "My My"
20. "Heaven's Cloud"
21. "Beautiful"
22. "Rock with You"
23. "To You"
24. "Thinkin' About You"
25. "Left & Right"
26. "All My Love"

=== Japan Edition ===
November 18, 2021

1. "Crush"
2. "Anyone"
3. "Clap"
4. "Ready to Love"
5. "Crazy in Love"
6. "Network Love"
7. "Fast Pace"
8. "Bittersweet" (Wonwoo and Mingyu)
9. "I Wish"
10. "Home" (Japanese version)
11. "Not Alone"
12. "Same Dream, Same Mind, Same Night" (vocal unit)
13. "20" (Japanese version; vocal unit)
14. "Last Order" (Dino)
15. "Spider" (Hoshi)
16. "Chilli" (Japanese version; hip-hop unit)
17. "Gam3 Bo1" (hip-hop unit)
18. "Snap Shoot" (Japanese version)
19. "My My"
20. "Heaven's Cloud"
21. "Beautiful"
22. "Rock with You"
23. "Power of Love" ("Ainochikara")
24. "Thinkin' About You"
25. "Left & Right"
26. "All My Love"

=== Love ===
November 21, 2021

1. "Crush"
2. "Anyone"
3. "Clap"
4. "Ready to Love"
5. "Crazy in Love"
6. "Network Love"
7. "Fast Pace"
8. "Bittersweet" (Wonwoo and Mingyu)
9. "I Wish"
10. "Home"
11. "Snap Shoot"
12. "Same Dream, Same Mind, Same Night" (vocal unit)
13. "Imperfect Love" (vocal unit)
14. "Zero (Hero)" (Dino)
15. "If I" (hip-hop unit)
16. "I Can't Run Away" (hip-hop unit)
17. "Tiger Power" (Hoshi)
18. "Oh My!"
19. "My My"
20. "Heaven's Cloud"
21. "Beautiful"
22. "Rock with You"
23. "To You"
24. "Thinkin' About You"
25. "Left & Right"
26. "All My Love"

== Reception ==
Carmen Chin of NME wrote that the virtual format did little to diminish the atmosphere and energy associated with Seventeen's live performances, highlighting the concert's large-scale staging and thematic structure. Sara Delgado of Teen Vogue similarly noted the contrast between the two Korean programs, describing the “Power” selection as more forceful and the “Love” selection as brighter and more playful.

== Broadcast and home media ==
=== Home media ===
The “Power” and “Love” concerts were released globally on DVD on June 30, 2022, and through a Weverse digital code on July 4. The 337-minute release contained the complete “Power” concert, the stages unique to the “Love” edition, individual focus-camera recordings of “Crush” and behind-the-scenes footage covering the production and both performance days.

The Japan Edition was released separately on DVD and Blu-ray on September 14, 2022. Both formats contained the complete concert and a making-of film, with a running time of approximately 211 minutes.

=== Concert film ===
The concerts were adapted into Seventeen Power of Love: The Movie, Seventeen's first feature-length film. Directed by Oh Yoon-dong, the 115-minute documentary combined performance footage with new interviews and behind-the-scenes material involving all thirteen members. It began its international theatrical release on April 20, 2022, with additional screenings on April 23, and was offered in standard, ScreenX, 4DX and combined 4DX Screen formats where available.The film grossed $2.82 million in reported markets worldwide.

Carmen Chin of NME gave the film three stars out of five, describing the film as a warm and energetic celebration of Seventeen's achievements and their relationship with fans, while criticizing the interviews for offering little new insight into the members and rarely exploring them beyond a surface level. Priyanka Sundar of Cinema Express also rated the film three out of five, writing that its interviews added value to the concert footage but criticizing its unfocused narrative, inadequate subtitles and occasionally jarring transitions between interviews and performances.

On July 21, 2023, the film became available in South Korea through IPTV and video-on-demand services, its first VOD release following its theatrical run.

== See also ==
- List of Seventeen live performances
- Seventeen videography
