= In-Complete =

2021 online concert by Seventeen

- Online concert by Seventeen
- Associated albums: Heng:garæ; Semicolon
- Date: January 23, 2021
- No. of shows: 1

Seventeen concert chronology
- Ode to You World Tour (2019); In-Complete (2021); Power of Love (2021)

In-Complete (stylized in all caps 2021 Seventeen Online Concert In-Complete) was the first online concert by South Korean boy band Seventeen. It was livestreamed through VenewLive on January 23, 2021, during the COVID-19 pandemic. It took place after the pandemic had cut short the group's Ode to You World Tour and forced the cancellation of their 2020 Japan Dome Tour.

The approximately three-hour concert comprised 25 performances, including the first performances of the four mixed-unit songs from Semicolon. Pledis Entertainment reported that viewers connected from 122 regions and that approximately 43 million comments had been posted in the live chat by the end of the broadcast. A recording was later issued on DVD and Blu-ray; across its staggered Japanese releases, it reached number one on all three of Oricon's weekly video rankings.

== Background and production ==
Seventeen began the Ode to You World Tour in Seoul in August 2019 and continued touring into early 2020, before the COVID-19 pandemic caused the cancellation of its remaining dates. In August 2020, the group held a livestreamed edition of its fan meeting Seventeen in Carat Land. Pledis Entertainment announced In-Complete on January 5, 2021. It was Seventeen's second online event after the fan meeting and its first solo online concert. The performance was the group's first concert in approximately one year and five months.

Livestream passes were sold exclusively through Weverse Shop from January 7 to January 23. A standard HD single-view pass provided one main feed, while members of Seventeen's Carat fan club could purchase an HD multi-view pass providing the main feed and three additional concept-camera feeds. The concert was streamed through VenewLive with live subtitles in English, Japanese and Chinese. A delayed single-view rebroadcast was offered at 11 a.m. KST on January 24, and the passes did not include video-on-demand access.

The concert continued the concepts of the extended play Heng:garæ and the special album Semicolon, using a unifying concept encompassing Seventeen's youth series. For a fan-participation segment, fans were invited to submit audio recordings of themselves singing "Us, Again" between January 15 and 17. A recording made from their submitted voices was played near the end of the concert.

== Concert synopsis ==
The concert opened with a sequence of rearranged small-unit performances. S.Coups, Hoshi and Woozi opened with "Intro. New World"; "Bring It", "My I", "Flower" and "Fear" followed in combinations of two to five members, before all thirteen reunited for "Fearless". The Korean-language version of "Fallin' Flower" and "Thanks" shifted the performance to a softer tone and preceded the group's first greeting. "Lie Again" and "Kidult" then led into stages by the hip-hop, vocal and performance teams, who performed "Back It Up", "Habit" and "Moonwalker", respectively.

The members then appeared in age-based units for the first performances of the four corresponding age-based units tracks from Semicolon. Each was given a distinct setting: "Ah! Love" took place in a jazz bar, "Light a Flame" used dancers and lighting effects, "Hey Buddy" was staged in a colorful house, and "Do Re Mi" used a playground set with child performers. These scene changes formed part of a broader production that moved among themed environments throughout the concert.

The latter full-group section connected "Snap Shoot", "Left & Right" and "Home;Run" through dialogue and a continuous musical-style narrative. It began in a supermarket, continued with the members travelling to a party during "Left & Right", and concluded with "Home;Run". Seventeen then performed "Shining Diamond" and "All My Love" before leaving the stage. When they returned, the pre-recorded fan chorus of "Us, Again" was played; the members subsequently spoke about the absence of an in-person audience and their hope of meeting fans again. The encore performances of "My My", "Campfire" and "Healing" brought the approximately three-hour concert to a close.

== Reception ==
Reviewing the concert for No Cut News, Kim Soo-jung identified its varied unit stages as one of its strengths. She observed that imprecision can make large-group choreography appear chaotic, but found errors difficult to identify in Seventeen's thirteen-member synchronization. Kim also described the jazz-bar staging of "Ah! Love" as resembling a musical and noted that the members handled the scripted situations and potentially awkward dialogue in "Snap Shoot" and "Left & Right" naturally.

Lee Jae-hoon of Newsis wrote that relying only on familiar descriptions of Seventeen as "refreshing", "cute" and "boyish" was inadequate, and said that In-Complete presented a "new world" for the group. He regarded a concert as the true test of an idol group's ability and concluded that Seventeen were making their own voice heard through their music and performances.

In September 2021, In-Complete was selected as one of four nominees in the concert category of the eighth Edaily Culture Awards. The jury selected the nominees based on artistic quality, originality, potential for development, commercial appeal and communicative power. Edaily described In-Complete as demonstrating Seventeen's strength as a global idol group and said that the four multi-view feeds clearly displayed the appeal and abilities of the thirteen members, both individually and as a group.

== Set list ==
The following set list is adapted from the official home-video contents and contemporary concert reports. The fan recording of "Us, Again" is shown but is not numbered as a performance by Seventeen.

1. "Intro. New World" (S.Coups, Hoshi and Woozi)
2. "Bring It" (Hoshi and Woozi)
3. "My I" (Jun and The8)
4. "Flower" (S.Coups, Jeonghan, Wonwoo, The8, Seungkwan and Dino)
5. "Fear"
6. "Fearless"
7. "Fallin' Flower" (Korean version)
8. "Thanks"
9. "Lie Again"
10. "Kidult"
11. "Back It Up" (hip-hop team)
12. "Habit" (vocal team)
13. "Moonwalker" (performance team)
14. "Ah! Love" (S.Coups, Jeonghan and Joshua)
15. "Light a Flame" (Jun, Hoshi, Wonwoo and Woozi)
16. "Hey Buddy" (The8, Mingyu and DK)
17. "Do Re Mi" (Seungkwan, Vernon and Dino)
18. "Snap Shoot"
19. "Left & Right"
20. "Home;Run"
21. "Shining Diamond"

Encore

22. "All My Love"

"Us, Again" (fan-recorded audio)

23. "My My"
24. "Campfire"
25. "Healing"

== Performances ==
List of performances
Date (2021)	Start time	Streaming platform
January 23	6:00 p.m. KST	VenewLive

== Viewership and home media ==
Pledis Entertainment reported that viewers connected to the livestream from 122 regions worldwide. Approximately 43 million comments had been posted in the live chat by the end of the broadcast.

In-Complete was released as a three-disc DVD on July 12, 2021, and as a three-disc Blu-ray on August 9. Both formats contained the full concert, VCR, rehearsal and performance-day making-of films, and individual member camera recordings of the hip-hop, vocal and performance-team stages. Japanese-subtitled editions were released on July 26 and August 16, respectively.

The Japanese DVD edition sold 13,000 copies in its first week and debuted at number one on both the Oricon Weekly DVD Ranking and Weekly Music DVD and Blu-ray Ranking. It was Seventeen's second release to lead both rankings, following '17 Japan Concert: Say the Name Seventeen in 2017. The Japanese Blu-ray edition subsequently topped Oricon's weekly Blu-ray ranking, giving the release number-one positions across all three of the chart company's weekly video rankings.

== See also ==
- List of Seventeen live performances
- Seventeen videography
