= Seventeen videography =

Seventeen video discography
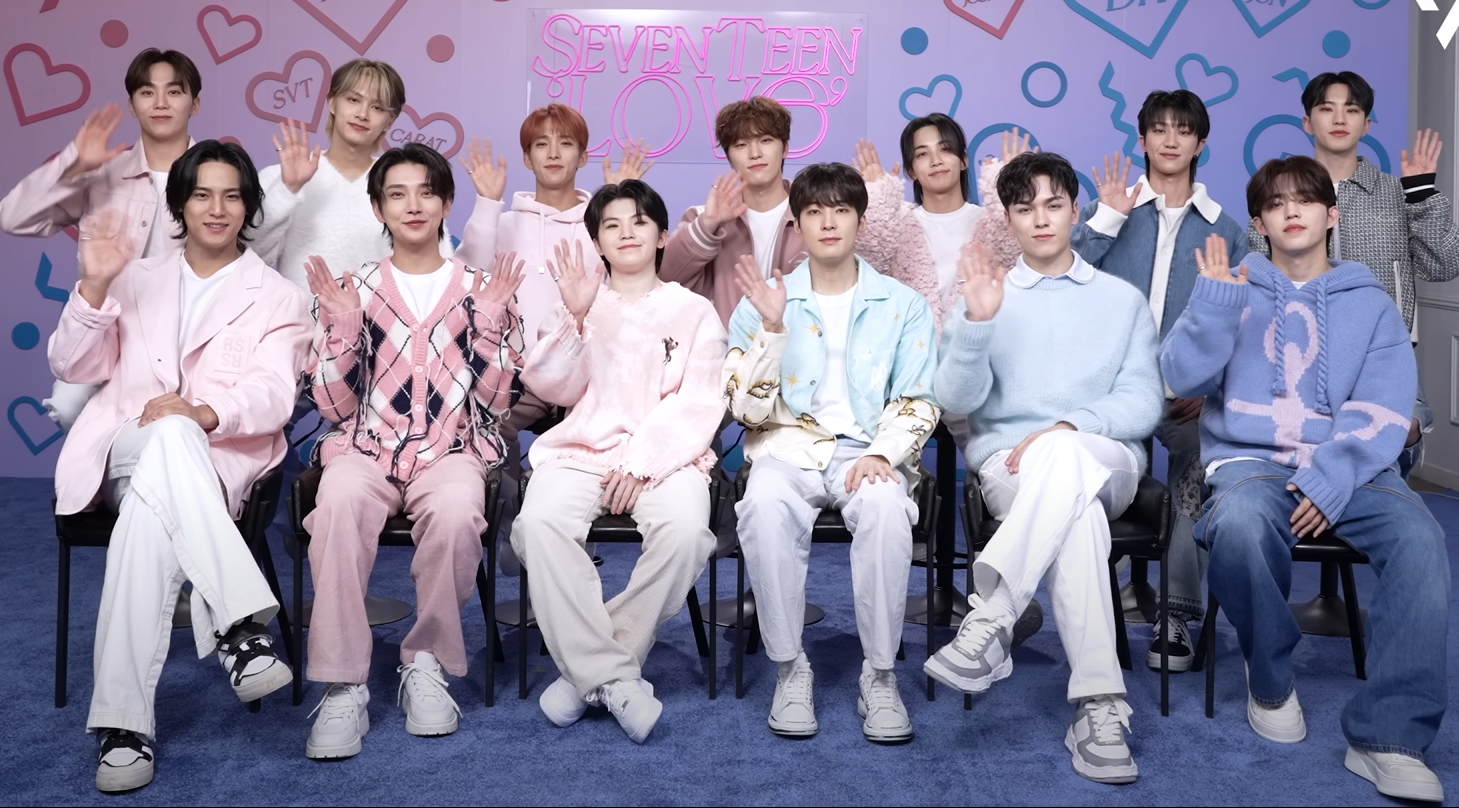
- Seventeen announcing 'Love' Fanmeeting in March 2023
- Video albums: 21
- Music videos: 52
- Films: 5
- Television: 10

South Korean boy band Seventeen debuted in May 2015. They have since released 52 music videos and 21 video albums.

Since 2017, they have starred in the web series Going Seventeen, alongside various travel shows that have featured their adventures in places such as Yeoseodo (for One Fine Day), Andong (for In The Soop Season 2) and Italy (for Nana Tour with Seventeen).

They have also been on a number of Asia and World tours, which have been documented in the form of cinema releases (Power of Love), YouTube documentaries (Hit the Road for the Ode To You tour), alongside standard DVD, Blu-ray and VOD releases.

== Music videos ==
=== Korean music videos ===
List of Korean music videos, showing year released and directors
Title	Year	Director(s)	Production studio	Ref.
"Adore U" (아낀다)	2015	Shin Don-geul	Dee Shin	
"Mansae" (만세)	2015	Im Seong-gwan	—	
"Pretty U" (예쁘다)	2016	Shin Hee-won	ST-WT	
"Very Nice" (아주 Nice)	2016	—	Digipedi	
"Healing" (힐링)	2016	Unknown		
"Check In" (Note: Credited as Seventeen but only features the group's hip hop unit.)	2016	Jo Beomjin	VM Project	
"Boom Boom" (붐붐)	2016	Yoo Sung-kyun	Sunnyvisual	
"Highlight"	2016	Yoo Sung-kyun	Sunnyvisual	
"Don't Wanna Cry" (울고 싶지 않아)	2017	Jo Beomjin	VM Project	
"Change Up" (Note: Credited as Seventeen but only features leaders S.Coups, Hoshi and Woozi.)	2017	Jo Beomjin	VM Project	
"Trauma"	2017	Jo Beomjin	VM Project	
"Lilili Yabbay" (13월의 춤) (Note: Credited as Seventeen but only features the group's performance unit.)	2017	Jo Beomjin	VM Project	
"Pinwheel" (바람개비) (Note: Credited as Seventeen but only features the group's vocal unit.)	2017	Jo Beomjin	VM Project	
"Clap" (박수)	2017	Jo Beomjin	VM Project	
"Thanks" (고맙다)	2018	Jo Beomjin	VM Project	
"Oh My!" (어쩌나)	2018	Jo Beomjin	VM Project	
"Holiday"	2018	Wonwoo	—	
"Getting Closer" (숨이 차)	2018	Jo Beomjin	VM Project	
"Home"	2019	Jo Beomjin	VM Project	
"Hit"	2019	Yoon Rima, Jang Dongju	Rigend Film	
"Fear" (독: Fear)	2019	Yoon Rima, Jang Dongju	Rigend Film	
"Snap Shoot"	2020	Mingyu	—	
"My My"	2020	Shin Don-geul	Dee Shin	
"Left & Right"	2020	Seong Wonmo	Digipedi	
"Home;Run"	2020	Seong Wonmo	Digipedi	
"Ready to Love"	2021	Han Sa-Min	Dextor-Lab	
"Anyone"	2021	—	Vikings League	
"Rock with You"	2021	Yoon Rima, Jang Dongju	Rigend Film	
"Hot"	2022	Yoon Rima, Jang Dongju	Rigend Film	
"Cheers"	2022	Jo Beomjin	VM Project	
"_World"	2022	Oui Kim	Oui	
"Super" (손오공)	2023	Oui Kim	Oui	
"F*ck My Life"	2023	Bang Jaeyeob	Bangjaeyeob Film	
"God of Music" (음악의 신)	2023	725	Sl8ight Visual Lab	
"Maestro"	2024	725	Sl8ight Visual Lab	
"Lalali"	2024	725	Sl8ight Visual Lab	
"Spell"	2024	725	Sl8ight Visual Lab	
"Cheers to Youth" (청춘찬가)	2024	725	Sl8ight Visual Lab	
"Love, Money, Fame" (featuring DJ Khaled)	2024	725	Sl8ight Visual Lab	
"Eyes on You"	2024	Woogie Kim	Mother	
"Thunder"	2025	Samson	HighQualityFish	

=== Japanese music videos ===
List of Japanese music videos, showing year released and directors
Title	Year	Director(s)	Production studio	Ref.
"Call Call Call!"	2018	Seong Won-mo	Digipedi	
"Happy Ending"	2019	Kim Woo-je	Etui Collective	
"Fallin' Flower" (舞い落ちる花びら)	2020	Yoon Rima, Jang Dongju	Rigend Film	
"24H"	2020	Shin Hee-won	ST-WT	
"Not Alone" (ひとりじゃない)	2021	Oui Kim	Oui	
"Power of Love" (あいのちから)	2021	Yoo Sung-kyun	Sunnyvisual	
"Dream"	2022	Seo Dong-hyuk	Flipevil	
"Ima (Even if the world ends tomorrow)" (今 -明日 世界が終わっても-)	2023	725	Sl8ight Visual Lab	
"Shohikigen" (消費期限)	2024	725	Sl8ight Visual Lab	

=== English music videos ===
List of English music videos, showing year released and directors
Title	Year	Director(s)	Production studio	Ref.
"Darl+ing"	2022	Yoon Rima, Jang Dongju	Rigend Film	
"Bad Influence"	2025	Jo Beomjin	VM Project	

== Albums ==
=== Live video albums ===
Title	Details	Corresponding tour/series	Ref.
2016 Like Seventeen 'Shining Diamond' in Seoul	Released: April 14, 2017; Labels: Pledis; Format: DVD, Blu-ray	Shining Diamonds Tour	
17 Japan Concert 'Say the Name #Seventeen'	Released: August 23, 2017 (DVD), April 18, 2018 (Blu-ray); Label: Pledis Japan; Formats: DVD, Blu-ray	17 Japan Concert 'Say the Name #Seventeen'	
2017 Seventeen 1st World Tour 'Diamond Edge' in Seoul	Released: April 3, 2018; Labels: Pledis; Format: DVD, Blu-ray	Diamond Edge World Tour	
2017 Seventeen 1st World Tour 'Diamond Edge' in Japan	Released: April 18, 2018; Label: Pledis Japan; Formats: DVD, Blu-ray	Diamond Edge World Tour	
Seventeen 2018 Japan Arena Tour 'SVT'	Released: August 29, 2018; Label: Pledis Japan; Formats: DVD, Blu-ray	SVT Japan Arena Tour	
2018 Seventeen Concert 'Ideal Cut' in Japan	Released: February 27, 2019; Label: Pledis Japan; Formats: DVD, Blu-ray	Ideal Cut Tour	
Seventeen 2018 Concert 'Ideal Cut' in Seoul	Released: March 28, 2019 (DVD), April 29, 2019 (Blu-ray); Label: Pledis; Formats: DVD, Blu-ray	Ideal Cut Tour	
Seventeen 2019 Japan Tour 'Haru'	Released: September 25, 2019; Label: Hybe Japan; Formats: DVD, Blu-ray	Haru Japan Tour	
Seventeen World Tour 'Ode to You' in Seoul	Released: January 10, 2020 (DVD), February 4, 2020 (Blu-ray); Label: Pledis; Formats: DVD, Blu-ray	Ode to You World Tour	
Seventeen World Tour 'Ode to You' In Japan	Released: March 4, 2020; Label: Warner Music Japan; Formats: DVD, Blu-ray	Ode to You World Tour	
2021 Online Concert 'In-Complete'	Released: July 12, 2021 (DVD), August 9, 2021 (Blu-ray); Labels: Pledis, Hybe; Format: DVD, Blu-ray	Online concerts	
2021 SVT 5th Fanmeeting 'Seventeen in Carat Land' Memory Book	Released: February 28, 2022; Label: Pledis, Hybe; Format: Digital code, Blu-ray	Korean fanmeetings	
2021 Seventeen Concert 'Power of Love'	Released: June 30, 2022 (DVD), July 4, 2022 (Digital code); Label: Pledis, Hybe; Format: Digital code, Blu-ray	Online concerts	
2021 Seventeen Concert 'Power of Love' Japan Edition	Released: September 14, 2022; Label: Hybe Japan; Formats: DVD, Blu-ray	Online concerts	
2022 SVT 6th Fanmeeting 'Seventeen in Carat Land'	Released: February 27, 2023 (Digital code), March 8, 2023 (DVD); Label: Pledis, Hybe; Format: Digital code, Blu-ray	Korean fanmeetings	
Seventeen 2022 Japan Fanmeeting 'Hanabi'	Released: April 12, 2023; Label: Hybe Japan; Formats: DVD, Blu-ray	Japanese Fanmeetings	
Seventeen World Tour 'Be The Sun'	Released: May 22, 2023 (Digital code), May 31, 2023 (DVD); Label: Pledis, Hybe; Format: Digital code, Blu-ray	Be The Sun World Tour	
Seventeen World Tour 'Be The Sun' Japan	Released: November 8, 2023; Label: Hybe Japan; Formats: DVD, Blu-ray	Be The Sun World Tour	
2023 Seventeen 7th Fanmeeting 'Seventeen in Carat Land'	Released: February 5, 2024; Label: Pledis, Hybe; Format: Digital code	Korean fanmeetings	
Seventeen 2023 Japan Fanmeeting 'Love'	Released: May 29, 2024; Label: Hybe Japan; Formats: Digital code, Blu-ray	Japanese fanmeetings	
Seventeen Tour 'Follow' to Seoul	Released: July 12, 2024; Label: Pledis, Hybe; Format: Digital code	Follow Tour	

== Filmography ==
=== Film ===
Year	Title	Role	Notes	Ref.
2022	Seventeen Power of Love: The Movie	Themselves	Documentary/concert, limited theatrical release. Footage also released on DVD.	
2024	Seventeen: The Magic Hour (매직아워, 더 세븐틴)	Themselves	Documentary/concert about the Follow Tour performances in Incheon. Broadcast by MBC.	
2024	Seventeen Tour Follow Again To Cinemas	Themselves	Documentary/concert about the Follow Tour performances in Seoul. Limited international theatrical release. VOD also released on Disney+.	
2025	Seventeen [Right Here] World Tour in Cinemas	Themselves	Documentary/concert about the Right Here performances in Goyang. Limited international theatrical release.	
2025	Seventeen World Tour [Be The Sun]	Themselves	Documentary/concert about the Be The Sun performances. Limited international theatrical release.	

=== Television shows ===
Year	Title	Notes	Ref.
2015	Seventeen Project: Debut Big Plan	7 episodes	
2016	Seventeen's One Fine Day	9 episodes	
2017	Seventeen's One Fine Day in Japan	8 episodes	
2018	SVT Club	8 episodes	
2021	Going Seventeen: Treasure Island: 13 Raiders	2 pre-release episodes	
2021	In the Soop SVT ver.	4 highlight episodes, the complete season was released via Weverse	
2022	Hybe Japan TV		
2023	In the Soop SVT ver. Season 2	3 highlight episodes, the complete season was released via Weverse	
2024	Nana Tour with Seventeen	6 episodes with extended cuts released via Weverse. Produced by Na Young-seok as a spin-off of Youth Over Flowers.	
2025	Nana BnB with Seventeen	3 episodes, with 3 additional episodes released via Weverse. Produced by Na Young-seok.	

=== Online shows ===
Year	Title	Notes	Ref.
2012–2014	Seventeen TV	4 seasons, 68 episodes	
2015	Hoshi and Seungkwan's Andromeda	26 episodes	
2017–present	Going Seventeen		
2020	IF Seventeen	17 episodes	
2020	Seventeen: Hit The Road	Documentary, 15 episodes	
2021	Smash. House	Japanese app-based video series	
2021	In the Soop SVT ver.	8 episodes	
2022	17Play	Facebook exclusive, 5 episodes	
2022	Smash. Fighting	Japanese app-based video series	
2023	In the Soop SVT ver. Season 2	6 episodes	
2024	Nana Tour with Seventeen	6 episodes (full version), edited episodes were broadcast on tvN	
2025	Seventeen: Our Chapter		
