= Ideal Cut Tour =

2018 concert tour by Seventeen

- Asia tour by Seventeen
- Associated album: Teen, Age; Director's Cut; You Make My Day
- Start date: June 28, 2018
- End date: November 4, 2018
- No. of shows: 18

Seventeen concert chronology
- SVT Japan Arena Tour (2018); Ideal Cut Tour (2018); Haru Japan Tour (2019)

The Ideal Cut Tour (stylized as 2018 Seventeen Concert 'Ideal Cut', in all caps) was a concert tour by South Korean boy band Seventeen. The tour began at Jamsil Arena in Seoul, South Korea, on June 28, 2018, before continuing to Hong Kong, Japan, Indonesia, Singapore, Malaysia, the Philippines and Taiwan. The initial itinerary comprised 16 performances across eight cities, concluding in Taipei on October 7.

After completing the overseas tour, Seventeen returned to Seoul for two encore concerts, titled 2018 SEVENTEEN CONCERT 'IDEAL CUT – THE FINAL SCENE' IN SEOUL, at the Olympic Gymnastics Arena on November 3 and 4. The tour concluded on November 4 after 18 performances.

== Background ==
On May 15, 2018, Pledis Entertainment announced 2018 SEVENTEEN CONCERT 'IDEAL CUT' IN SEOUL, initially consisting of three concerts at Jamsil Arena from June 29 to July 1. The title referred to the ideal cutting of a diamond and was intended to represent the group's more refined and varied sides. Each of the three concerts was centered on one of Seventeen's internal teams: H cut for the hip-hop team, V cut for the vocal team and P cut for the performance team.

After all three concerts sold out, a fourth performance was added for June 28. Titled Ideal Cut – The Scene, the additional show was conceived as a combined performance incorporating elements of the three unit-themed concerts. The four Seoul concerts subsequently drew approximately 27,000 attendees.

Additional concerts were announced across East and Southeast Asia, including Hong Kong, Jakarta, Singapore, Kuala Lumpur, Manila and Taipei. In Japan, three concerts at Saitama Super Arena were initially scheduled for September 4–6. After those dates sold out, two additional concerts were added for September 8 and 9; all five performances ultimately sold out.

On September 18, Pledis announced two encore concerts, titled 2018 SEVENTEEN CONCERT 'IDEAL CUT – THE FINAL SCENE' IN SEOUL, for November 3 and 4 at the Olympic Gymnastics Arena. The encore concerts were presented as the concluding chapter of Ideal Cut and featured individual solo stages divided between the two performances.

=== Member participation ===
Vernon injured his leg during the final stage of the June 29 concert in Seoul and received treatment that included having his leg placed in a cast. He continued to participate in the June 30 and July 1 concerts, but performed seated during stages involving choreography and did not participate in some performances on medical advice.

During the final concert of Ideal Cut – The Final Scene on November 4, Hoshi experienced a recurring shoulder dislocation while performing "Chuck" and temporarily left the stage for treatment. The remaining members adjusted the concert while he was absent, and Hoshi returned later in the performance.

== Reception ==
The four opening concerts in Seoul attracted approximately 27,000 attendees. Star Today highlighted the contrasting concepts presented across the four performances, particularly the distinct stages centered on Seventeen's hip-hop, vocal and performance teams.

In Japan, all five concerts at Saitama Super Arena sold out, with Seventeen becoming the first solo artist to stage five days of performances at the venue. The concerts, together with two Seventeen Japan Fanmeeting 'Carat Summer Camp' events held during the same period, attracted approximately 120,000 attendees. The Manila concert marked Seventeen's third consecutive sold-out solo concert in the city. BusinessWorld praised the group's synchronized choreography, the variety provided by its three units and its live performance.

Reviews of the tour also emphasized the group's performance and cohesion. Bandwagon praised the members' live vocals, coordination and stage presence during the Singapore concert, describing Seventeen as a strong and cohesive live act. The two Final Scene concerts in Seoul attracted approximately 25,000 attendees. Sports Kyunghyang highlighted the group's synchronization and teamwork during the final concert, particularly their ability to adjust the performance when Hoshi temporarily left the stage.

== Set list ==
The following set list is from the September 6, 2018 concert at Saitama Super Arena in Saitama, Japan, and is not intended to represent all performances on the tour.

Act I

1. "Intro. New World"
2. "Highlight"
3. "Thanks"

Act II

4. "Bring It"
5. "Flower"
6. "No F.U.N"
7. "Run to You"
8. "Beautiful"
9. "Change Up"

Act III

10. "Un Haeng Il Chi" – Hip-hop team
11. "20" (Japanese version) – Vocal team
12. "Pinwheel" – Vocal team
13. "Swimming Fool" – Performance team
14. "Jam Jam" – Performance team

Act IV

15. "Thinkin' About You"
16. "Hello"
17. "Rocket"
18. "Pretty U"
19. "Shining Diamond"
20. "Adore U"
21. "Oh My!"
22. "Call Call Call!"

Encore

23. "Love Letter" (Japanese version)
24. "Healing" (Korean and Japanese versions)
25. "Very Nice"

== Tour dates ==
List of concerts, showing dates, cities, countries, venues, attendance, revenue and references for the Ideal Cut Tour
| Date (2018) | City | Country | Venue | Attendance | Revenue | Ref. |
|---|---|---|---|---|---|---|
| June 28 | Seoul | South Korea | Jamsil Arena | 27,000 | — | |
| June 29 | Seoul | South Korea | Jamsil Arena | 27,000 | — | |
| June 30 | Seoul | South Korea | Jamsil Arena | 27,000 | — | |
| July 1 | Seoul | South Korea | Jamsil Arena | 27,000 | — | |
| August 31 | Hong Kong | China | AsiaWorld–Arena | — | — | |
| September 4 | Saitama | Japan | Saitama Super Arena | — (Note: The five Ideal Cut concerts and two Seventeen Japan Fanmeeting 'Carat Summer Camp' events held during the same period attracted approximately 120,000 attendees combined. A separate attendance figure for the five concerts was not reported.) | — | |
| September 5 | Saitama | Japan | Saitama Super Arena | — | — | |
| September 6 | Saitama | Japan | Saitama Super Arena | — | — | |
| September 8 | Saitama | Japan | Saitama Super Arena | — | — | |
| September 9 | Saitama | Japan | Saitama Super Arena | — | — | |
| September 16 | Jakarta | Indonesia | ICE BSD City Hall 3A | — | — | |
| September 21 | Singapore | | Singapore Indoor Stadium | — | — | |
| September 23 | Kuala Lumpur | Malaysia | MIECC | 5,000 | — | |
| September 29 | Pasay | Philippines | SM Mall of Asia Arena | — | — | |
| October 6 | Taipei | Taiwan | Xinzhuang Gymnasium | 10,000 | — | |
| October 7 | Taipei | Taiwan | Xinzhuang Gymnasium | 10,000 | — | |
| November 3 | Seoul | South Korea | Olympic Gymnastics Arena | 25,000 | — | |
| November 4 | Seoul | South Korea | Olympic Gymnastics Arena | 25,000 | — | |
| Total | | | | — | — | — |

== Broadcast and home media ==
The September 6, 2018 concert at Saitama Super Arena was recorded for television and broadcast by WOWOW Live on October 28, 2018.

The same concert was released in Japan as 2018 SEVENTEEN CONCERT 'IDEAL CUT' IN JAPAN on DVD and Blu-ray on February 27, 2019. The release contains the September 6 performance and a behind-the-scenes making film covering the Saitama concerts and the Seventeen Japan Fanmeeting 'Carat Summer Camp' events.

A separate home-video release, 2018 SEVENTEEN CONCERT 'IDEAL CUT' IN SEOUL, documented the Seoul concerts and included concert footage as well as rehearsal and behind-the-scenes material. A Japanese edition was subsequently released on DVD on April 23 and Blu-ray on May 29, 2019.

== See also ==
- List of Seventeen live performances
