= Haru Japan Tour =

2019 concert tour by Seventeen

- Japan tour by Seventeen
- Location: Japan
- Associated album: You Made My Dawn; We Make You
- Start date: April 2, 2019
- End date: April 27, 2019
- No. of shows: 12

Seventeen concert chronology
- Ideal Cut Tour (2018); Haru Japan Tour (2019); Ode to You World Tour (2019–2020)

The Haru (Note: Haru (Japanese: 春; lit. 'Spring')) Japan Tour (stylized as Seventeen 2019 Japan Tour Haru, in all caps) was a Japanese concert tour by South Korean boy band Seventeen. The tour began on April 2, 2019, at Marine Messe Fukuoka and concluded on April 27 at Osaka-jō Hall, comprising twelve concerts at five venues across Japan.

Originally announced as a ten-show tour in December 2018, two additional concerts were later added at Makuhari Messe and Osaka-jō Hall, bringing the total to twelve, all of which sold out. During the same period, Seventeen held four fan meetings in Japan; the twelve concerts and four fan meetings attracted approximately 200,000 attendees combined.

== Background ==
Seventeen made their Japanese debut on May 30, 2018, with the extended play We Make You. In September that year, the group performed in Japan on the Ideal Cut tour at Saitama Super Arena. Three originally scheduled concerts were expanded to five following ticket demand, with all five shows selling out.

On December 3, 2018, Seventeen announced their next Japanese concert tour, the Haru Tour. The itinerary initially comprised ten concerts in Fukuoka, Shizuoka, Saitama, Chiba and Osaka between April 2 and 26, 2019, and included the group's first tour stops in Fukuoka and Shizuoka. Later that month, four fan meetings were announced for Chiba and Osaka during the same period as the concert tour.

Two additional concerts were subsequently added at Makuhari Messe on April 21 and Osaka-jō Hall on April 27, increasing the tour to twelve shows. By the opening concert at Marine Messe Fukuoka on April 2, tickets for all twelve concerts had sold out.

The tour followed the January 2019 release of Seventeen's sixth Korean extended play, You Made My Dawn, material from which was featured in the concerts. Overall, the twelve concerts and four fan meetings attracted approximately 200,000 attendees.

== Reception ==
Japanese media praised the tour's set list and staging. Kstyle highlighted the use of new material alongside rearranged older songs, as well as the transitions between performances and the group's stamina during concerts lasting more than three hours. BARKS similarly noted the set-list structure and staging designed to improve audience interaction, including the use of carts during the encore.

== Set list ==
The following set list is from the April 27, 2019 concert at Osaka-jō Hall and is not intended to represent every performance on the tour.

Act I

1. "Call Call Call!"
2. "Clap"
3. "Good to Me"
4. "Crazy in Love"
5. "Rock"

Act II – Unit stages

6. "Check-In" (Hip-hop team; remixed version)
7. "What's Good" (Hip-hop team)
8. "Highlight" (Performance team; Japanese version)
9. "Moonwalker" (Performance team)
10. "Pinwheel" (Vocal team)
11. "Come to Me" (Vocal team)
12. "Run to You"

Act III

13. "Don't Wanna Cry" (acoustic version)
14. "Without You"
15. "Fast Pace"
16. "Home"
17. "Thanks"

Act IV

18. "Oh My!" (Japanese version)
19. "Very Nice"
20. "Adore U"
21. "Getting Closer"

Encore

22. "Our Dawn Is Hotter Than Day"
23. "Beautiful"
24. "Holiday"

== Tour dates ==
Concert dates
Date (2019)	City	Country	Venue
April 2	Fukuoka	Japan	Marine Messe Fukuoka
April 3	Fukuoka	Japan	Marine Messe Fukuoka
April 6	Fukuroi (Note: The official tour schedule listed the stop as Shizuoka; Ecopa Arena is located in Fukuroi, Shizuoka Prefecture.)	Japan	Ecopa Arena
April 7	Fukuroi	Japan	Ecopa Arena
April 9	Saitama	Japan	Saitama Super Arena
April 10	Saitama	Japan	Saitama Super Arena
April 19	Chiba	Japan	Makuhari Messe; International Exhibition Halls 9–11
April 20	Chiba	Japan	Makuhari Messe; International Exhibition Halls 9–11
April 21	Chiba	Japan	Makuhari Messe; International Exhibition Halls 9–11
April 25	Osaka	Japan	Osaka-jō Hall
April 26	Osaka	Japan	Osaka-jō Hall
April 27	Osaka	Japan	Osaka-jō Hall

== Broadcast and home media ==
The April 20 concert at Makuhari Messe International Exhibition Halls 9–11 was recorded for television. The full concert was broadcast on WOWOW on June 23, 2019.

The tour's final concert at Osaka-jō Hall on April 27 was simultaneously broadcast live to cinemas throughout Japan.

A concert video titled SEVENTEEN 2019 Japan Tour 'Haru' was released on DVD and Blu-ray on September 25, 2019. The release contains the Makuhari Messe concert as well as behind-the-scenes footage from all five tour locations and footage from the concurrently held fan meetings.

== See also ==
List of Seventeen live performances
