= Diamond Edge World Tour =

2017 concert tour by Seventeen

- World tour by Seventeen
- Location: Asia; North America; South America
- Associated album: Al1
- Start date: July 14, 2017
- End date: October 6, 2017
- No. of shows: 12 in Asia; 4 in North America; 1 in South America; 17 total
- Attendance: 200,000

Seventeen concert chronology
- '17 Japan Concert: Say the Name Seventeen (2017); Diamond Edge World Tour (2017); SVT Japan Arena Tour (2018)

The Diamond Edge World Tour (stylized as 2017 Seventeen 1st World Tour "Diamond Edge" in all caps) was the first world concert tour by South Korean boy band Seventeen. The tour began at Jamsil Auxiliary Stadium in Seoul on July 14, 2017, and concluded at the SM Mall of Asia Arena in Pasay, Philippines, on October 6. It comprised 17 concerts in 14 cities across Asia, North America and South America. The tour was reported to have attracted a total audience of 200,000.

Following the May 2017 release of Seventeen's fourth extended play, Al1, the tour drew a reported total of 200,000 attendees across 14 cities.

== Background ==
In May 2017, Pledis Entertainment announced that Seventeen would embark on their first world tour, beginning with three concerts at Jamsil Auxiliary Stadium in Seoul from July 14 to 16. The initial itinerary comprised 16 concerts in 13 cities across 11 countries, expanding the group's touring activities beyond Asia to North America. The completed tour was later reported as comprising 17 concerts in 14 cities.

The tour was announced shortly before the May 22 release of Seventeen's fourth extended play, Al1, led by the single "Don't Wanna Cry". Material from the EP featured prominently in the concert programme.

The opening Seoul concerts drew a combined audience of 30,000. The approximately three-hour production contrasted water and fire concepts, with water-based performances during the opening portion and a fire-themed presentation later in the show. Each concert also featured a different extended unit stage: the performance unit on July 14, the hip-hop unit on July 15 and the vocal unit on July 16.

The tour continued with two concerts at Saitama Super Arena on July 26 and 27, which attracted a combined audience of 60,000 despite Seventeen not having officially debuted in Japan. The concerts included Japanese-language versions of "20", "Love Letter" and "Healing", with the latter performed in Japanese for the first time.

=== Member participation ===
Hoshi missed the August 18 concert in Chicago after experiencing abdominal pain and being diagnosed with acute enteritis at a local hospital. Although he wished to perform, Pledis Entertainment decided that he should rest and recover; the remaining twelve members performed without him.

== Reception ==
In a review of the second Seoul concert, Hwang Hye-jin of Newsen praised Seventeen's live singing and performances, describing them as flawless. She also highlighted the hip-hop team's intense concert-exclusive stage. Despite the torrential rain, Hwang commended the members for moving continuously between the main, central and extended stages while interacting enthusiastically with the audience. She further noted the spectacle created by the production's contrasting water and fire effects, including water cannons and large flame displays.

At the group's sold-out New York City debut at Terminal 5, Jeff Benjamin of Billboard described the show as fun and cohesive. He praised the members for being "perfectly in-sync" while displaying "exciting, individualized and multifaceted performance styles". Benjamin also highlighted the programme's division among the hip-hop, vocal and performance units as a showcase of the group's range.

Writing for the New Straits Times, Bibi Nurshuhada Ramli praised Seventeen's synchronization at the Stadium Negara concert in Kuala Lumpur, describing the group's thirteen-member choreography as coordinated and visually pleasing. She singled out "Mansae" and "Boom Boom", writing that the more demanding choreography was performed effortlessly and with precision.

Covering the tour's final concert at the SM Mall of Asia Arena in the Philippines, Janine Villagracia of Inquirer.net highlighted the group's self-produced music and choreography, soulful vocals, forceful dancing and playful stage interactions. She described the performance unit's stages as visually captivating and credited the hip-hop unit with heightening the concert's energy.

== Set list ==
The following set list is from the third concert at Jamsil Auxiliary Stadium in Seoul on July 16, 2017, and is not intended to represent every concert of the tour. The three Seoul concerts featured a different extended unit stage each night: the performance team on July 14, the hip-hop team on July 15 and the vocal team on July 16.

Act I

1. "Pretty U" (remix version)
2. "Beautiful"
3. "Adore U"
4. "Still Lonely" (13-member version)
5. "Very Nice"
6. "Swimming Fool" (performance unit)

Act II

1. "Mansae" (remix version)
2. "Boom Boom"

Act III – Extended unit stages
Day 1 – July 14 Performance-team stage	Day 2 – July 15 Hip-hop-team stage	Day 3 – July 16 Vocal-team stage
1. "OMG" (remix version); 2. "The Real Thing" (Dino); 3. "My I" (Jun and The8); 4. "Hurricane" (Hoshi); 5. "Highlight" (remix version)	1. "Joker" / "What's the Problem" / "MMO" (medley); 2. "Un Haeng Il Chi"; 3. "Ah Yeah" (remix version); 4. "Fronting" (remix version); 5. "Check-In"; 6. "Lotto" (new remix)	1. "We Gonna Make It Shine" (2017 version); 2. "Don't Listen in Secret" (rearranged version); 3. "Say Yes" (DK and Seungkwan); 4. "With Me" (Woozi); 5. "Falling for U" (Jeonghan and Joshua); 6. "When I Grow Up"; 7. "20"

Act IV

1. "Crazy in Love"
2. "Fast Pace" (rearranged version)
3. "If I" (hip-hop unit)
4. "Habit" (vocal unit)
5. "Rock" (remix version)
6. "Chuck"
7. "Don't Wanna Cry"

Encore

1. "Shining Diamond"
2. "Fronting" (13-member version)
3. "Healing"

== Tour dates ==
List of concerts
Date (2017)	City	Country	Venue	Attendance
July 14	Seoul	South Korea	Jamsil Auxiliary Stadium	30,000
July 15	Seoul	South Korea	Jamsil Auxiliary Stadium	30,000
July 16	Seoul	South Korea	Jamsil Auxiliary Stadium	30,000
July 26	Saitama	Japan	Saitama Super Arena	60,000
July 27	Saitama	Japan	Saitama Super Arena	60,000
August 5	Bangkok	Thailand	Thunder Dome	5,500
August 12	Hong Kong	China	AsiaWorld–Expo Hall 10	5,000
August 18	Rosemont	United States	Rosemont Theatre	—N/a
August 23	Grand Prairie	United States	Verizon Theatre at Grand Prairie	—N/a
August 25	Toronto	Canada	Massey Hall	—N/a
August 27	New York City	United States	Terminal 5	—N/a
August 29	Santiago	Chile	Movistar Arena	—N/a
September 9	Kuala Lumpur	Malaysia	Stadium Negara	—N/a
September 23	Tangerang	Indonesia	Indonesia Convention Exhibition Hall 3A	—N/a
September 29	Singapore		Suntec Singapore Convention and Exhibition Centre, Halls 601–604	—N/a
October 1	New Taipei City	Taiwan	Xinzhuang Gymnasium	5,000
October 6	Pasay	Philippines	SM Mall of Asia Arena	—N/a
Total				200,000

== Broadcast and home media ==
The second concert at Saitama Super Arena, held on July 27, 2017, was recorded and broadcast exclusively on WOWOW Prime on September 18 under the title 2017 Seventeen 1st World Tour 'Diamond Edge' in Japan.

Footage from the three opening concerts in Seoul was released in April 2018 as the three-DVD set 2017 Seventeen 1st World Tour Concert Diamond Edge. The first two discs contained the main concert programme and a making-of film, while the third compiled the performance, hip-hop and vocal units' concert-exclusive stages from the three shows.

A separate recording of the July 27 Saitama concert was released in Japan on April 18, 2018, in two-DVD and single-disc Blu-ray editions. Both editions contained approximately 183 minutes of concert footage, a 55-minute making-of film and a 100-page photobook.

== See also ==
- List of Seventeen live performances
