= SVT Japan Arena Tour =

2018 concert tour by Seventeen

- Japan tour by Seventeen
- Location: Japan
- Associated album: Al1; Teen, Age; Director's Cut
- Start date: February 21, 2018
- End date: March 7, 2018
- No. of shows: 6

Seventeen concert chronology
- Diamond Edge World Tour (2017); SVT Japan Arena Tour (2018); Ideal Cut Tour (2018)

The SVT Japan Arena Tour (stylized as Seventeen 2018 Japan Arena Tour 'SVT', in all caps) was a Japanese arena concert tour by South Korean boy band Seventeen. The tour began on February 21, 2018, at Yokohama Arena and concluded on March 7 at Nippon Gaishi Hall in Nagoya, comprising six concerts across three cities.

During the second Yokohama concert on February 22, Seventeen announced that they would make their Japanese debut on May 30, 2018.

== Background ==
Before their official Japanese debut, Seventeen had steadily expanded their live audience in Japan. In August 2016, the group held its first solo concerts outside South Korea, performing five shows in Tokyo and Osaka under the title 2016 'Like Seventeen – Shining Diamond' in Japan Concert. The concerts attracted approximately 13,000 attendees. In February 2017, their second Japanese concert series, '17 Japan Concert Say the Name #Seventeen, comprised six sold-out performances in Kobe and Yokohama and attracted approximately 50,000 people. Restricted-view seating was additionally released and sold out for the two Yokohama Arena concerts.

Seventeen returned to Japan in July 2017 as part of their Diamond Edge World Tour. The group performed two concerts at Saitama Super Arena using the venue's 30,000-capacity stadium configuration, attracting approximately 60,000 attendees across the two dates.

On November 24, 2017, Seventeen announced the six-date Seventeen 2018 Japan Arena Tour 'SVT'. The itinerary comprised two concerts each at Yokohama Arena, Osaka-jō Hall and Nippon Gaishi Hall in Nagoya between February 21 and March 7, 2018. The Nagoya dates marked the group's first concerts in the city. Alongside the tour, Seventeen scheduled their first official Japanese fan-club meetings, titled Seventeen Japan Official Fanclub Meeting 'Carat Camp'. One fan meeting was held during the afternoon of the second concert date in each city, before the corresponding evening performance.

The tour was staged before Seventeen had formally debuted or released a record in Japan. Shortly before the tour, the group released the Korean-language special album Director's Cut on February 5, 2018. The album reached number four on Tower Records' weekly overall chart and number two on Oricon's weekly albums chart, while spending two consecutive weeks atop Oricon's international albums chart.

The arena tour opened at Yokohama Arena on February 21. During the second Yokohama concert on February 22, Seventeen performed several songs in Japanese, including a Japanese-language version of "Lean on Me", before announcing that they would make their official Japanese debut on May 30. Following the conclusion of the tour, the group's debut release was confirmed as the five-track Japanese extended play We Make You.

== Reception ==
Kstyle's Kim Taku reviewed the February 22 concert positively, praising the contrast between Seventeen's polished performances and playful audience interaction. The reviewer highlighted the large-scale production, including the centrally positioned rotating stage and wirelessly controlled light sticks, which extended the staging throughout the arena. The pyrotechnics and red lighting accompanying "Clap", "No F.U.N" and "Chuck" were praised as an effective opening sequence, while "Don't Wanna Cry" and "Without You" showed a softer side of the group's performance style.

The review also praised the variety provided by the vocal, performance and hip-hop unit stages and the three unit leaders' performance of "Change Up". The first Japanese-language performance of "Lean on Me" was identified as a highlight, with the audience joining its refrain, while the rotating-sofa choreography of "Pretty U" was compared to a musical performed in the round. Kstyle described the 26-song program as a representative selection of Seventeen's work and presented the announcement of their forthcoming Japanese debut as the culmination of the concert.

== Commercial performance ==
Demand for the tour exceeded the initial reserved-seat allocation, which sold out before the concerts. Limited standing-room tickets were subsequently made available for selected performances. All six concerts in Yokohama, Osaka and Nagoya ultimately sold out, despite taking place before Seventeen's official Japanese debut.

The two opening concerts at Yokohama Arena attracted approximately 30,000 attendees combined. The sell-outs were regarded as evidence of the group's established Japanese following before the release of their first Japanese record.

Together, the six arena concerts and three accompanying Carat Camp fan meetings attracted approximately 100,000 attendees.

== Set list ==
The following set list is from the February 22, 2018 concert at Yokohama Arena and is not intended to represent all concerts throughout the tour.

Act 1

1. "Clap"
2. "No F.U.N"
3. "Chuck"
4. "Don't Wanna Cry"
5. "Without You"
6. "Still Lonely"
7. "Hello"

Act 2

8. "Pinwheel"
9. "Lilili Yabbay"
10. "Trauma"
11. "Change Up"
12. "Crazy in Love"

Act 3

13. "Habit"
14. "When I Grow Up"
15. "Lean on Me" (Japanese version)
16. "Fronting"
17. "Jam Jam"
18. "Swimming Fool"
19. "Pretty U"

Act 4

20. "Boom Boom"
21. "Mansae"
22. "Adore U"
23. "Thanks"

Encore

24. "Campfire"
25. "Love Letter" (Japanese version)
26. "Very Nice"

== Tour dates ==
List of concerts, showing dates, cities, countries, venues and attendance, showing dates, cities, countries, venues and attendance
Date (2018)	City	Country	Venue	Attendance
February 21	Yokohama	Japan	Yokohama Arena	30,000
February 22	Yokohama	Japan	Yokohama Arena	30,000
February 27	Osaka	Japan	Osaka-jō Hall	—
February 28	Osaka	Japan	Osaka-jō Hall	—
March 6	Nagoya	Japan	Nippon Gaishi Hall	—
March 7	Nagoya	Japan	Nippon Gaishi Hall	—

== Broadcast and home media ==
The February 22, 2018 concert at Yokohama Arena, where Seventeen announced their forthcoming Japanese debut, was recorded for television broadcast and home media. The concert, performed was broadcast by WOWOW on April 29, 2018.

The Yokohama concert was subsequently released in Japan on DVD and Blu-ray on August 29, 2018, under the title SEVENTEEN 2018 JAPAN ARENA TOUR 'SVT'. The release contains all 26 songs performed at the concert, with approximately 140 minutes of concert footage, as well as a 97-minute making-of film documenting the tour and accompanying fan meetings in Yokohama, Osaka, and Nagoya. The DVD edition was issued on two discs and the Blu-ray edition on one disc, with both editions including a 100-page photo book.

The DVD and Blu-ray were reissued in Japan on September 27, 2023, as part of a reissue of Seventeen's earlier Japanese concert releases.

== See also ==
- List of Seventeen live performances
