= List of Seventeen live performances =

Seventeen live performances
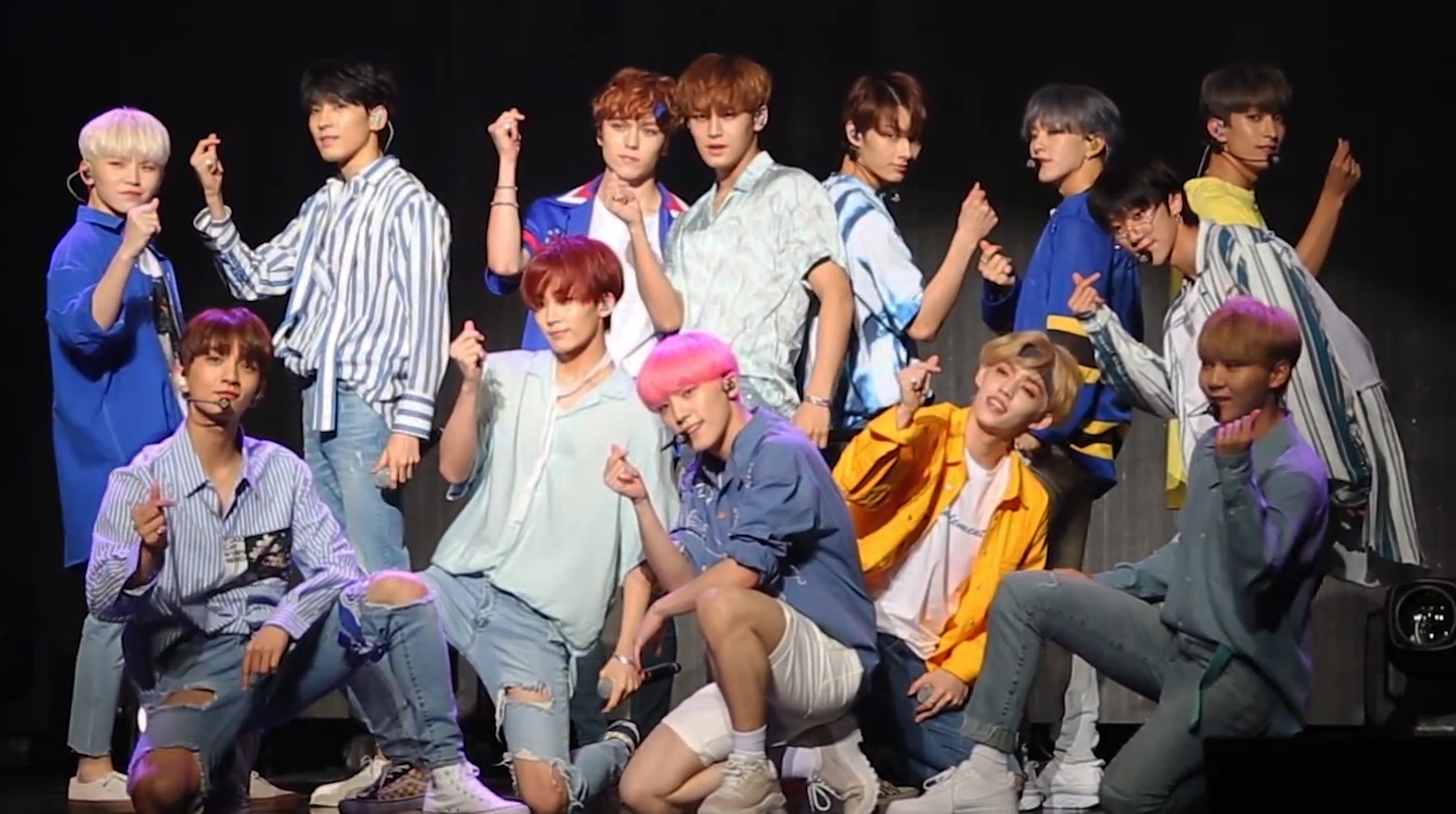
- Seventeen performing in 2018 at a showcase for You Make My Day
- Concert tours: 9
- Standalone concerts: 5
- Fan meetings: 15
- Showcases: 13
- Music festivals: 19

South Korean boy group Seventeen debuted in 2015 and have since embarked on concert tours that have taken them throughout Asia, Oceania, and North and South America. To date, they have held nine concert tours, alongside a number of standalone concerts and fan meetings. They have also been welcomed to perform at multiple festivals, award shows and television specials across the world.

Seventeen's live performances are well regarded by critics and fans alike, while achieving significant commercial success and accolades. Touring data from Billboard placed the group's Follow Tour as the top grossing K-pop tour of 2023, and the magazine went on to award them "Top K-pop Touring Artist" at the 2024 Billboard Music Awards. Critic Rhian Daly reviewed the group's European festival debut at Glastonbury Festival 2024 on the Pyramid Stage for NME, and their set was one of the few performances to be rated five stars. Beyond the festival, the group's concerts are often described as "high energy" with commendation for their synchronization as a 13-piece group.

The group have garnered notable popularity in their neighboring country of Japan. It has been the only country they have visited on every tour held, even dedicating entire tours, fan meetings and standalone concerts to Japan. In recent years, touring in Japan has enabled the group to perform in and sell out larger capacity arenas and stadiums across multiple cities in a single country, netting sales for 400,000 seats and above. Touring in Japan has often coincided with releases of Japanese-language singles and albums, such as "Shohikigen" and Always Yours.

Starting with the Be The Sun World Tour, Seventeen and their label Pledis Entertainment have held events alongside concerts under "The City Project". The project includes activities for fans such as stamp rallies and lighting up various Japanese tourist attractions such as Tokyo Skytree and the Osaka Hep Five Ferris Wheel in themed colors. For the Follow and Right Here tours, the label began hosting the events alongside concerts in other countries as well. The project initially focused on collaborating with organizations directly, and has expanded to collaborations with government organizations including the Yokohama City Council and Singapore Tourism Board.

Throughout the group's ten years of touring, their concert venues have grown in capacity from the Blue Square Concert Hall in Seoul, seating 1,000 people, to some of the world's largest venues. Seventeen have since performed concerts at South Korea's second-largest stadium (Seoul World Cup Stadium), Japan's largest stadium (Nissan Stadium), Thailand's largest stadium (Rajamangala Stadium), Indonesia's largest stadium (Jakarta International Stadium), and the world's largest indoor arena (Philippine Arena).

== Concert tours ==
Summary table of concert tours, showing dates, associated album(s), number of shows, and attendance
Title	Dates	Associated album(s)	Continent(s)	Shows	Attendance	Ref.
Shining Diamonds Tour	July 30, 2016 – September 11, 2016	17 Carat; Boys Be; Love & Letter	Asia; Oceania	17	47,000	
Diamond Edge World Tour	July 14, 2017 – October 6, 2017	Al1; Teen, Age	Asia; North America; South America	17	200,000	
SVT Japan Arena Tour	February 21, 2018 – March 8, 2018	Al1; Teen, Age	Asia	6	110,000	
Ideal Cut Tour	June 28, 2018 – November 4, 2018	Al1; Teen, Age; You Make My Day	Asia	18	152,714 (Note: Based on 14/18 shows.)	
Haru Japan Tour	April 2, 2019 – April 27, 2019	We Make You; You Make My Day; You Made My Dawn	Asia	12	200,000	
Ode to You World Tour	August 30, 2019 – February 8, 2020	An Ode	Asia; North America	24	176,233 (Note: Based on 13/24 shows.)	
Be The Sun World Tour	June 25, 2022 – December 28, 2022	Face the Sun; Sector 17	Asia; North America	29	539,872	
Follow Tour	July 21, 2023 – May 26, 2024	FML; Always Yours; Seventeenth Heaven; 17 Is Right Here	Asia	28	988,141	
Right Here World Tour	October 12, 2024 – February 16, 2025	Spill the Feels	Asia; North America	30	1,037,000	
New_ World Tour	September 13, 2025 – April 5, 2026	Happy Burstday	Asia; North America	31	840,000	

== Shining Diamonds Tour ==
Shining Diamonds Tour
- Tour by Seventeen
- Start date: July 30, 2016
- End date: September 11, 2016
- No. of shows: 14 in Asia; 3 in Oceania; 17 total
- Attendance: 47,000

Seventeen concert chronology
- ...; Shining Diamonds Tour (2016); Diamond Edge World Tour (2017)

The Shining Diamonds Tour (stylized as Seventeen 1st Asia Pacific Tour Shining Diamonds 2016) was Seventeen's first tour of Asia and Oceania, as organised by Pledis Entertainment and Type Communication Group. The tour was held from July 30 to September 11, 2016, starting in Seoul, South Korea, and concluding in Taipei, Taiwan, visiting a total of twelve cities.

The tour began with concerts in South Korea and Japan under the title of Like Seventeen – Shining Diamonds Concert, while the rest of the tour was promoted as Seventeen's 1st Asia Pacific Tour. A concert was scheduled for September 9 in Beijing, China; however, it was canceled as a result of China banning South Korean exports, including performances by South Korean groups in the country.

List of concerts, showing dates, cities, countries, venues and attendance for the Shining Diamonds Tour
Date (2016)	City	Country	Venue	Attendance
July 30	Seoul	South Korea	Jamsil Arena	14,000
July 31	Seoul	South Korea	Jamsil Arena	14,000
August 5 (two shows)	Osaka	Japan	Grand Cube Osaka	13,000
August 8	Tokyo	Japan	Nakano Sun Plaza Hall	13,000
August 9 (two shows)	Tokyo	Japan	Nakano Sun Plaza Hall	13,000
August 13	Singapore		MegaBox Convention Centre	20,000
August 14	Parañaque (Note: Labelled as Manila in promotional material.)	Philippines	The Theatre at Solaire	20,000
August 15	Parañaque	Philippines	The Theatre at Solaire	20,000
August 20	Jakarta	Indonesia	Balai Sarbini	20,000
August 21	Bangkok	Thailand	Muang Thai GMM Live House	20,000
August 27	Melbourne	Australia	Melbourne Convention and Exhibition Centre	20,000
August 28	Sydney	Australia	Big Top Sydney	20,000
August 30	Auckland	New Zealand	The Trusts Arena	20,000
September 4	Hong Kong	China	KITEC	20,000
September 11	Taipei	Taiwan	ATT Show Box	20,000
Total				47,000

List of canceled concerts, showing dates, cities, countries, venues and reason for the Shining Diamonds Tour
Date (2016)	City	Country	Venue	Reason
September 9	Beijing	China	Huiyuan Space	Chinese ban on South Korean exports

== Diamond Edge World Tour ==
The Diamond Edge World Tour was Seventeen's first world tour, organized by Pledis Entertainment, Show Note, and Live Nation. The tour was held from July 14 to October 6, 2017, starting in Seoul, South Korea, and ending in Pasay, Philippines, visiting in total 14 cities. They performed for 200,000 fans throughout the tour.

Jeff Benjamin reviewed the tour's stop at New York's Terminal 5 for Billboard, describing the sold-out show as fun and cohesive, as well as commending the group for being "perfectly in-sync" with "exciting, individualized and multifaceted performance styles".

== SVT Japan Arena Tour ==
The SVT Japan Arena Tour was Seventeen's first Japanese concert tour, organized by Pledis Entertainment. The tour was held from February 21 to March 7, 2018, in Yokohama, Osaka, and Nagoya. Attendance amounted to 110,000 over the three cities.

== Ideal Cut Tour ==
The Ideal Cut Tour (stylized as 2018 Seventeen Concert Ideal Cut) was Seventeen's third Asia tour. The tour was announced on May 15, 2018, and began in Seoul, South Korea, on June 28, 2018. The tour went to seven more cities across East and Southeast Asia, and ended with an encore concert in Seoul on November 4, 2018.

== Haru Japan Tour ==
The Haru (Note: Haru (Japanese: 春; lit. 'Spring')) Japan Tour (stylized as Seventeen 2019 Japan Tour Haru) was Seventeen's third Japan concert tour organized by Pledis Entertainment and Pledis Japan. The tour ran from April 2 to 27, 2019, in Fukuoka, Shizuoka, Saitama, Chiba and Osaka, with a total of twelve shows across the five cities.

== Ode to You World Tour ==
Seventeen performing on the Ode to You World Tour in North America

The Ode to You World Tour was the group's second world concert tour, supporting their third studio album An Ode. The tour began on August 30, 2019, at the KSPO Dome in Seoul, South Korea, and concluded in Pasay, Philippines, after the COVID-19 pandemic caused the cancelation of the tour's entire European leg. The tour had other difficulties, including the cancelation of a Japanese performance due to Typhoon Hagibis and members S.Coups and Jeonghan taking health-related breaks.

Still, the tour had some success; 40,000 tickets were sold for the show's opening nights in Seoul, a new record for the group, and the opening show was positively received by critic Hong Dam-young.

== 2020 Japan Dome Tour ==
The 2020 Japan Dome Tour was scheduled to be Seventeen's first dome tour in Japan. Following the conclusion of the Japanese leg of the Ode to You tour on November 9, 2019, Seventeen announced the tour on November 11. Initially scheduled at three of Japan's dome arenas (Tokyo Dome, Fukuoka PayPay Dome, and Kyocera Dome Osaka), additional dates at Seibu Dome were added later. The entire tour was canceled as a result of the COVID-19 pandemic.

Seventeen eventually debuted at Tokyo Dome and Kyocera Dome during their Be The Sun World Tour. The group performed at Fukuoka Dome and Seibu Dome, among others, for the Japanese leg of their Follow Tour.

List of canceled concerts, showing dates, cities, countries, venues and reason for the 2020 Japan Dome Tour
Date (2019)	City	Country	Venue	Reason
May 9	Tokorozawa	Japan	Seibu Dome	COVID-19 pandemic
May 10	Tokorozawa	Japan	Seibu Dome	COVID-19 pandemic
May 19	Tokyo	Japan	Tokyo Dome	COVID-19 pandemic
May 20	Tokyo	Japan	Tokyo Dome	COVID-19 pandemic
May 23	Fukuoka	Japan	Fukuoka PayPay Dome	COVID-19 pandemic
May 24	Fukuoka	Japan	Fukuoka PayPay Dome	COVID-19 pandemic
May 27	Osaka	Japan	Kyocera Dome Osaka	COVID-19 pandemic
May 28	Osaka	Japan	Kyocera Dome Osaka	COVID-19 pandemic

== Be The Sun World Tour ==
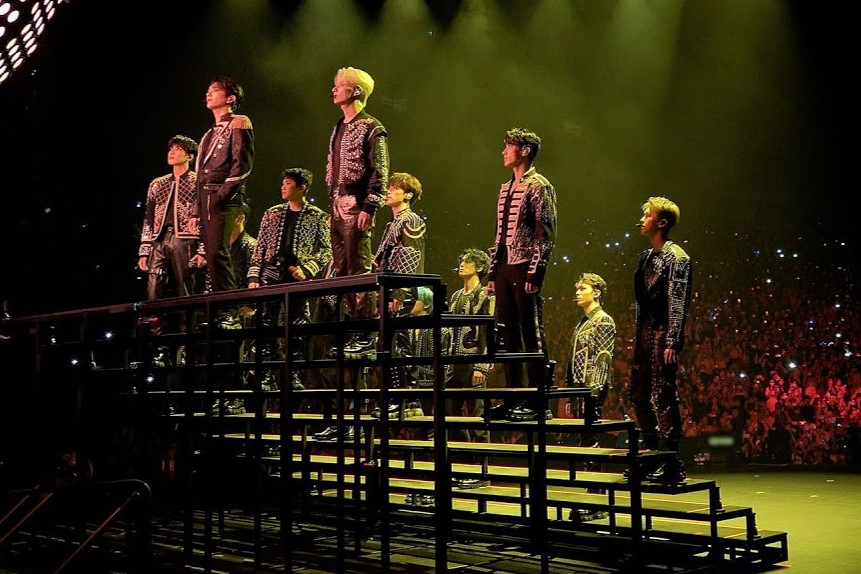
Seventeen performing on the North American leg of the Be The Sun tour

The Be The Sun Tour was the group's third world concert tour headlined and was the first tour they held following the COVID-19 pandemic. The tour began on June 25, 2022, at the Gocheok Sky Dome in Seoul, South Korea, and concluded on December 28, 2022, at Gelora Bung Karno Madya Stadium in Jakarta, Indonesia, visiting a total of 21 cities across Asia and North America.

The tour was regarded as a commercial success, with the reported box scores for the first 21 shows and final 8 shows each placing in the top 100 of Billboard's end of 2022 and midyear 2023 touring reports, respectively, based on reporting windows. The final attendance figure was over 500,000 people with a box office total at US$57,000,000. The group's performance was also well regarded, with critics noting the group's energy and "enthusiasm for life" throughout the three-hour set, though the tour faced setbacks with various shows having members absent due to having contracted COVID-19 and needing to isolate.

== Follow Tour ==
The Follow Tour was Seventeen's fourth concert tour of Asia. The tour began on July 21, 2023, at the Gocheok Sky Dome in Seoul, South Korea, and concluded on May 26, 2024, at Nissan Stadium in Yokohama, Japan. Despite only touring five countries, it became Seventeen's most commercially successful tour, with the group making their first stadium appearances in each country. The tour earned Seventeen the Top K-pop Touring Artist award at Billboard's 31st Billboard Music Awards.

== Right Here World Tour ==
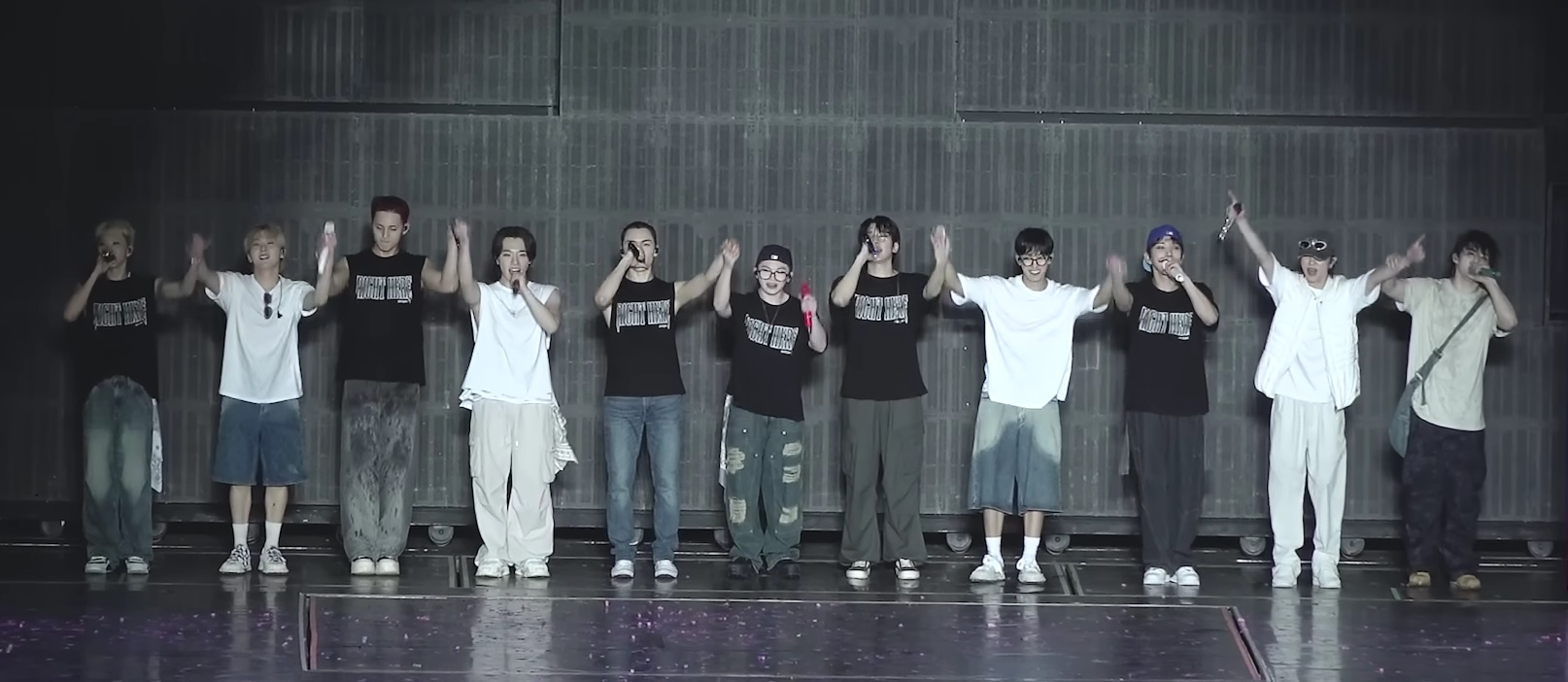
Seventeen closing a concert on the Right Here World Tour

The Right Here World Tour was the group's fifth world tour. It began four months after the conclusion of the previous tour, on October 12, 2024, at Goyang Stadium, in South Korea, and concluded on February 16, 2025, at Rajamangala National Stadium in Bangkok, Thailand. Spanning thirty shows across fourteen cities, the Right Here tour was the first by the group to not be performed by the whole group from the outset, with Jeonghan beginning his mandatory enlistment in the South Korean military and Jun taking a break from group activities in order to work in China. It became the group's first tour to surpass 1 million tickets sold, including a stadium debut in the United States' BMO Stadium. The tour was well received by critics at multiple stops, with the group being commended for their high energy levels and stage presence across the three-hour set.

== New_ World Tour ==
The New_ World Tour was the group's sixth world tour. It began on September 13, 2025, in Incheon, South Korea, and included dates in South Korea, Hong Kong, the United States, Japan, Singapore, Thailand and the Philippines. The tour was performed by only nine members of the group, with Jeonghan, Wonwoo, Hoshi and Woozi all completing their military services. The tour concluded on April 5, 2026, with two encore performances in Incheon.

== Concerts ==
List of standalone concerts, showing event names, dates, cities, countries, venues and attendance
Event name	Date	City	Country	Venue	Attendance	Ref.
Like Seventeen – Boys Wish	December 24, 2015	Seoul	South Korea	Yongsan Art Hall	3,200	
Like Seventeen – Boys Wish	December 25, 2015 (two shows)	Seoul	South Korea	Yongsan Art Hall	3,200	
Like Seventeen – Boys Wish	December 26, 2015	Seoul	South Korea	Yongsan Art Hall	3,200	
Like Seventeen – Boys Wish Encore Concert	February 13, 2016	Seoul	South Korea	SK Olympic Handball Gymnasium	7,000	
Like Seventeen – Boys Wish Encore Concert	February 14, 2016	Seoul	South Korea	SK Olympic Handball Gymnasium	7,000	
17 Japan Concert: Say The Name #Seventeen	February 15, 2017	Kobe	Japan	World Memorial Hall	28,000	
17 Japan Concert: Say The Name #Seventeen	February 16, 2017	Kobe	Japan	World Memorial Hall	28,000	
17 Japan Concert: Say The Name #Seventeen	February 18, 2017	Kobe	Japan	World Memorial Hall	28,000	
17 Japan Concert: Say The Name #Seventeen	February 19, 2017	Kobe	Japan	World Memorial Hall	28,000	
17 Japan Concert: Say The Name #Seventeen	February 21, 2017	Yokohama	Japan	Yokohama Arena	24,000	
17 Japan Concert: Say The Name #Seventeen	February 22, 2017	Yokohama	Japan	Yokohama Arena	24,000	

=== Online concerts ===
During the COVID-19 pandemic, capacity restrictions meant that in-person events could not be held, leading to the cancelation of the second half of the Ode to You World Tour and the entire 2020 Japan Dome Tour. Instead, Seventeen hosted four online concerts, broadcast in real time via Weverse. The first concert, In-Complete, was a standalone, while the group's second online concerts were part of the "Power of Love" project, encompassing three unique shows with the same theme. For the Power of Love shows, Jun and The8 were in China and therefore were not present for the performances. The pair did call in via video chat for a portion of the concert, and a pre-recorded performance of "Network Love", with Joshua and Vernon, was included in the broadcast.

List of online concerts, showing event names, dates, cities, countries and venues
Event name	Edition	Date	City	Country	Venue	Ref.
In-Complete	—N/a	January 23, 2021	Seoul	South Korea	Weverse Online Streaming	
Power of Love	"Power"	November 14, 2021	Seoul	South Korea	KSPO Dome; Weverse Online Streaming	
Power of Love	Japan (Note: The November 18 concert was recorded in Seoul but was distributed in Japan only.)	November 18, 2021	Seoul	South Korea	KSPO Dome; Weverse Online Streaming	
Power of Love	"Love"	November 21, 2021	Seoul	South Korea	KSPO Dome; Weverse Online Streaming	

== Fan meetings ==
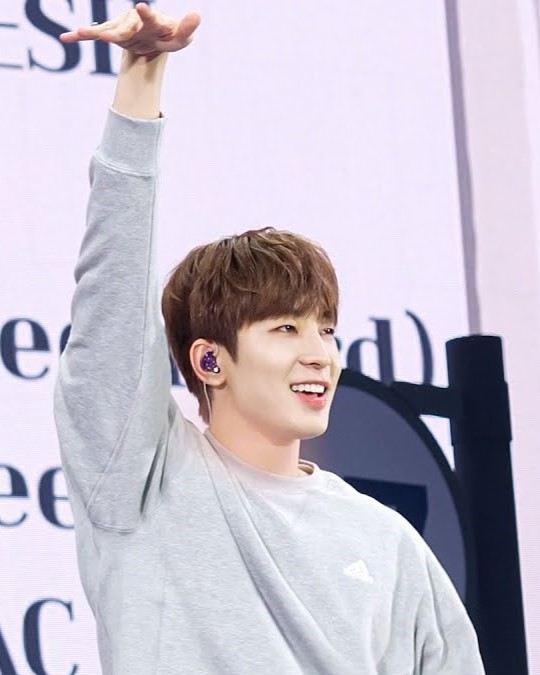
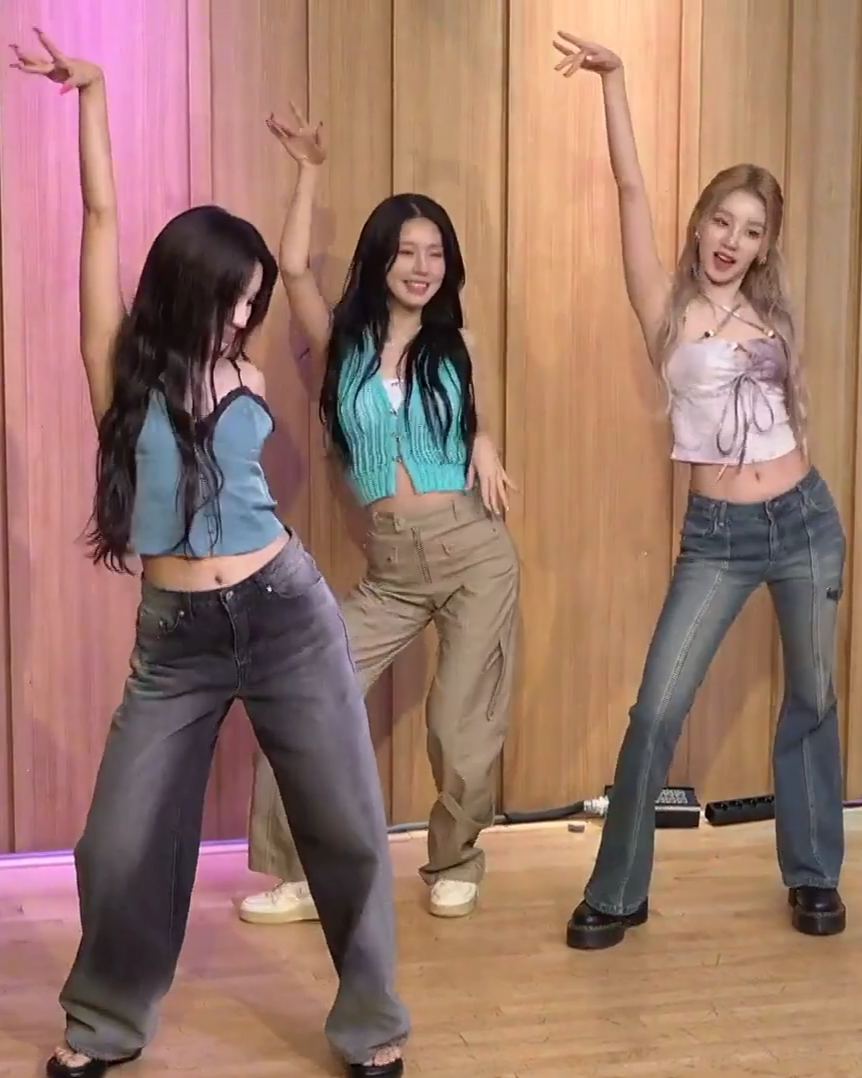
Wonwoo (left) performing (G)I-dle's (right) choreography for "Queencard" at 'Seventeen in Carat Land' 2024

Since 2017, Seventeen have held annual fan meetings; concert-like events involving the group performing skits, playing games on stage with each other and with the crowd, and usually performing songs, though fewer than the number of songs performed at a standard concert. Fan meetings held in South Korea have all occurred under the name "Seventeen in Carat Land", named after their fanbase, while fan meetings in Japan have each had a unique name and theme.

In the 2023 and 2024 editions of "Seventeen in Carat Land", each member of the group has performed a dance cover of "songs that don't suit Seventeen", based on fan suggestions and as punishments for failing challenges. Covers included Woozi performing NewJeans' "Ditto", S.Coups performing Ive's "After Like" and Hoshi performing the theme of Japanese series Hamtaro. In 2024, covers included Wonwoo performing (G)I-dle's "Queencard" and Hoshi performing Riize's "Siren". In 2026, the members performed covers of each other's solo songs from Happy Burstday, alongside covers of other artists as in other years; Mingyu covered Illit's "It's Me" while Dino covered Itzy's "That's a No No", for example.

List of fan meetings, showing event names, dates, cities, countries, venues and attendance
Event name	Date	City	Country	Venue	Attendance	Ref.
'Seventeen in Carat Land' 2017 1st Fan meeting	February 10, 2017	Seoul	South Korea	Jamsil Indoor Stadium	20,000	
'Seventeen in Carat Land' 2017 1st Fan meeting	February 11, 2017	Seoul	South Korea	Jamsil Indoor Stadium	20,000	
'Seventeen in Carat Land' 2017 1st Fan meeting	February 12, 2017	Seoul	South Korea	Jamsil Indoor Stadium	20,000	
'Seventeen in Carat Land' 2018 SVT 2nd Fan meeting	February 2, 2018	Seoul	South Korea	Jamsil Indoor Stadium	20,000	
'Seventeen in Carat Land' 2018 SVT 2nd Fan meeting	February 3, 2018	Seoul	South Korea	Jamsil Indoor Stadium	20,000	
Seventeen Japan Official Fanclub Meeting 'Carat Camp'	February 22, 2018	Yokohama	Japan	Yokohama Arena	—N/a	
Seventeen Japan Official Fanclub Meeting 'Carat Camp'	February 28, 2018	Osaka	Japan	Osaka-jō Hall	—N/a	
Seventeen Japan Official Fanclub Meeting 'Carat Camp'	March 7, 2018	Nagoya	Japan	Nippon Gaishi Hall	—N/a	
Seventeen Japan Fan meeting 'Carat Summer Camp'	September 8, 2018	Saitama	Japan	Saitama Super Arena	34,285	
Seventeen Japan Fan meeting 'Carat Summer Camp'	September 9, 2018	Saitama	Japan	Saitama Super Arena	34,285	
'Seventeen in Carat Land' 2019 SVT 3rd Fan meeting	March 8, 2019	Seoul	South Korea	Jamsil Indoor Stadium	21,000	
'Seventeen in Carat Land' 2019 SVT 3rd Fan meeting	March 9, 2019	Seoul	South Korea	Jamsil Indoor Stadium	21,000	
'Seventeen in Carat Land' 2019 SVT 3rd Fan meeting	March 10, 2019	Seoul	South Korea	Jamsil Indoor Stadium	21,000	
Seventeen Japan Fan meeting 'Hana' (Note: Hana (Japanese: 花; lit. 'Flowers'))	April 22, 2019 (Two shows)	Chiba	Japan	Makuhari Messe	—N/a	
Seventeen Japan Fan meeting 'Hana'	April 26, 2019	Osaka	Japan	Osaka-jō Hall	—N/a	
Seventeen Japan Fan meeting 'Hana'	April 27, 2019	Osaka	Japan	Osaka-jō Hall	—N/a	
'Seventeen in Carat Land' 2020 SVT 4th Fan Meeting	August 30, 2020	Seoul	South Korea	Weverse	— (Note: The event was streamed online only, with no in-person attendees.)	
'Seventeen in Carat Land' 2021 SVT 5th Fan Meeting	August 8, 2021	Seoul	South Korea	Weverse	— (Note: The event was streamed online only, with no in-person attendees. 98,000 people streamed the concert online.)	
'Seventeen in Carat Land' 2022 SVT 6th Fan Meeting	March 25, 2022	Seoul	South Korea	Jamsil Auxiliary Stadium	15,000	
'Seventeen in Carat Land' 2022 SVT 6th Fan Meeting	March 26, 2022	Seoul	South Korea	Jamsil Auxiliary Stadium	15,000	
'Seventeen in Carat Land' 2022 SVT 6th Fan Meeting	March 27, 2022	Seoul	South Korea	Jamsil Auxiliary Stadium	15,000	
Seventeen 2022 Japan Fan Meeting 'Hanabi' (Note: Hanabi (Japanese: 花火; lit. 'Fireworks'))	May 7, 2022	Saitama	Japan	Saitama Super Arena	60,000	
Seventeen 2022 Japan Fan Meeting 'Hanabi'	May 8, 2022	Saitama	Japan	Saitama Super Arena	60,000	
'Seventeen in Carat Land' 2023 SVT 7th Fan Meeting	March 10, 2023	Seoul	South Korea	KSPO Dome	28,500	
'Seventeen in Carat Land' 2023 SVT 7th Fan Meeting	March 11, 2023	Seoul	South Korea	KSPO Dome	28,500	
'Seventeen in Carat Land' 2023 SVT 7th Fan Meeting	March 12, 2023	Seoul	South Korea	KSPO Dome	28,500	
Seventeen 2023 Japan Fan Meeting 'Love'	May 17, 2023	Osaka	Japan	Kyocera Dome	180,000	
Seventeen 2023 Japan Fan Meeting 'Love'	May 18, 2023	Osaka	Japan	Kyocera Dome	180,000	
Seventeen 2023 Japan Fan Meeting 'Love'	May 27, 2023	Tokyo	Japan	Tokyo Dome	180,000	
Seventeen 2023 Japan Fan Meeting 'Love'	May 28, 2023	Tokyo	Japan	Tokyo Dome	180,000	
'Seventeen in Carat Land' 2024 SVT 8th Fan Meeting	July 23, 2024	Seoul	South Korea	Gocheok Sky Dome	34,000	
'Seventeen in Carat Land' 2024 SVT 8th Fan Meeting	July 24, 2024	Seoul	South Korea	Gocheok Sky Dome	34,000	
'Seventeen in Carat Land' 2025 SVT 9th Fan Meeting	March 20, 2025	Incheon	South Korea	Incheon Munhak Stadium	58,000	
'Seventeen in Carat Land' 2025 SVT 9th Fan Meeting	March 21, 2025	Incheon	South Korea	Incheon Munhak Stadium	58,000	
Seventeen 2025 Japan Fan Meeting 'Holiday'	April 24, 2025	Osaka	Japan	Kyocera Dome	120,000	
Seventeen 2025 Japan Fan Meeting 'Holiday'	April 26, 2025	Osaka	Japan	Kyocera Dome	120,000	
Seventeen 2025 Japan Fan Meeting 'Holiday'	April 27, 2025	Osaka	Japan	Kyocera Dome	120,000	
Seventeen 2025 Japan Fan Meeting 'Holiday'	May 10, 2025	Saitama	Japan	Saitama Super Arena	60,000	
Seventeen 2025 Japan Fan Meeting 'Holiday'	May 11, 2025	Saitama	Japan	Saitama Super Arena	60,000	
Seventeen 2026 Japan Fan Meeting 'Yakosoku'	May 13, 2026	Tokyo	Japan	Tokyo Dome	180,000	
Seventeen 2026 Japan Fan Meeting 'Yakosoku'	May 14, 2026	Tokyo	Japan	Tokyo Dome	180,000	
Seventeen 2026 Japan Fan Meeting 'Yakosoku'	May 23, 2026	Osaka	Japan	Kyocera Dome	180,000	
Seventeen 2026 Japan Fan Meeting 'Yakosoku'	May 24, 2026	Osaka	Japan	Kyocera Dome	180,000	
'Seventeen in Carat Land' 2026 SVT 10th Fan Meeting	June 20, 2026	Incheon	South Korea	Incheon Asiad Main Stadium	58,000	
'Seventeen in Carat Land' 2026 SVT 10th Fan Meeting	June 21, 2026	Incheon	South Korea	Incheon Asiad Main Stadium	58,000	

== Showcases ==
List of showcases, showing event names, dates, cities, countries, venues and attendance
Event name	Date	Associated album(s)	City	Country	Venue	Attendance	Ref.
Project Showcase Mission	May 10, 2015	—N/a	Seoul	South Korea	Blue Square Concert Hall	1,000	
17 Carat Showcase	May 26, 2015	17 Carat	Goyang	South Korea	MBC Dream Center	1,000	
Boys Be Showcase	September 10, 2015	Boys Be	Seoul	South Korea	Digital Magic Space	—N/a	
Love & Letter Showcase	April 24, 2016	Love & Letter	Seoul	South Korea	AX Korea	1,000	
Going Seventeen Showcase	December 5, 2016	Going Seventeen	Seoul	South Korea	Blue Square Concert Hall	1,500	
Al1 Showcase	May 23, 2017	Al1	Seoul	South Korea	Olympic Hall	4,000	
We Make You Showcase	May 30, 2018 (2 shows)	We Make You	Tokyo	Japan	Toyosu Pit	12,000	
We Make You Showcase	May 31, 2018 (2 shows)	We Make You	Tokyo	Japan	Toyosu Pit	12,000	
You Make My Day Showcase	July 16, 2018	You Make My Day	Seoul	South Korea	Blue Square Concert Hall	—N/a	
You Made My Dawn Showcase	January 21, 2019	You Made My Dawn	Seoul	South Korea	Olympic Hall	—N/a	
Happy Ending Showcase	June 7, 2019 (2 shows)	Happy Ending	Yokohama	Japan	Pacifico Yokohama	—N/a	
Happy Ending Showcase	June 12, 2019 (2 shows)	Happy Ending	Kobe	Japan	World Memorial Hall	—N/a	
Ode to Youth	September 29, 2019	An Ode	Seoul	South Korea	Ro-un Hall	—N/a	
Feast of Youth	October 31, 2020	Heng:garæ	Seoul	South Korea	–	—N/a	
Symphony No. 17: Da Capo	May 4, 2024	17 Is Right Here	Seoul	South Korea	Blue Square Concert Hall	—N/a	
B-Day Party: Burst Stage	May 25, 2025	Happy Burstday	Seoul	South Korea	Jamsu Bridge	Over 206,000	
Happy Burstday Special GV	June 8, 2025	Happy Burstday	Seoul	South Korea	Yonsei University Auditorium	1,000	

== Joint concerts and festival appearances ==
List of joint concert and festival performances, showing event names, dates, cities, countries and venues
Event name	Date	City	Country	Venue	Ref.
Dream Concert	June 4, 2016	Seoul	South Korea	Seoul World Cup Stadium	
KCON	June 24, 2016	Newark	United States	Prudential Center	
MBC Music K-Plus Concert	March 25, 2017	Hanoi	Vietnam	My Dinh National Stadium	
KCON	May 21, 2017	Chiba	Japan	Makuhari Messe	
Dream Concert	June 3, 2017	Seoul	South Korea	Seoul World Cup Stadium	
KCON	August 19, 2017	Los Angeles	United States	Staples Center	
KCON	April 14, 2018	Chiba	Japan	Makuhari Messe	
Dream Concert	May 12, 2018	Seoul	South Korea	Seoul World Cup Stadium	
SBS Super Concert	July 7, 2018	Taipei	Taiwan	Taipei Nangang Exhibition Center	
KCON	August 12, 2018	Los Angeles	United States	Staples Center	
SBS Super Concert	October 14, 2018	Suwon	South Korea	Suwon World Cup Stadium	
Music Bank World Tour	January 19, 2019	Hong Kong	China	AsiaWorld–Expo	
Dream Concert	May 18, 2019	Seoul	South Korea	Seoul World Cup Stadium	
SBS Super Concert	July 6, 2019	Hong Kong	China	AsiaWorld–Expo	
KCON	July 7, 2019	New York City	United States	Javits Center	
Summer Sonic Festival	August 17, 2019	Osaka	Japan	Maishima Sports Island	
UAE Korea Festival	October 18, 2019	Dubai	United Arab Emirates	Dubai World Trade Centre	
LA3C Music and Food Festival	December 11, 2022	Los Angeles	United States	Los Angeles State Historic Park	
Tencent Music Entertainment Awards Festival	July 9, 2023	Macau	China	Galaxy Arena	
Weverse Con Festival	June 16, 2024	Incheon	South Korea	Inspire Entertainment Resort	
Glastonbury Festival 2024	June 28, 2024	Pilton	United Kingdom	Worthy Farm	
Lollapalooza Berlin	September 8, 2024	Berlin	Germany	Olympiastadion	
Tecate Pal Norte	April 4, 2025	Monterrey	Mexico	Parque Fundidora	

== Television specials ==
List of television specials, showing event names, dates, cities, countries and performed song(s)
Event name	Date	City	Country	Performed song(s)	Ref.
2015 SBS Gayo Daejeon	December 27, 2015	Seoul	South Korea	"Adore U"	
2015 MBC Gayo Daejejeon	December 30, 2015	Ilsan	South Korea	"Mansae"	
2016 SBS Gayo Daejeon	December 26, 2016	Seoul	South Korea	Girl group cover medley ("Into the New World" (Note: Girls' Generation cover), "U-Go-Girl" (Note: Lee Hyo-ri cover) and "('Cause) I'm Your Girl" (Note: S.E.S. cover)) and "Boom Boom"	
2016 KBS Song Festival	December 29, 2016	Seoul	South Korea	"Wild Eyes" (Note: Shinhwa cover), "Pretty U" and "Boom Boom"	
2016 MBC Gayo Daejejeon	December 31, 2016	Ilsan	South Korea	"Happiness" (Note: H.O.T. cover), "Honey" (Note: J. Y. Park cover) and "Very Nice"	
2017 KBS Song Festival	December 29, 2017	Seoul	South Korea	"Don't Wanna Cry", "Habit" (Vocal Unit), "Check-In" (Hip Hop Unit), "Who" (Performance Unit), "Boom Boom" and "Clap"	
2017 MBC Gayo Daejejeon	December 31, 2017	Ilsan	South Korea	"Campfire" and "Clap"	
2018 SBS Gayo Daejeon	December 25, 2018	Seoul	South Korea	"Call Call Call!" (Korean version)	
2018 KBS Song Festival	December 28, 2018	Seoul	South Korea	"Thanks" and "Getting Closer"	
2018 MBC Gayo Daejejeon	December 31, 2018	Ilsan	South Korea	"Just Do It" and "Oh My!"	
2019 SBS Gayo Daejeon	December 25, 2019	Seoul	South Korea	"Home" and "Snap Shoot"	
2019 KBS Song Festival	December 27, 2019	Ilsan	South Korea	"Good to Me"	
2019 MBC Gayo Daejejeon	December 31, 2019	Ilsan	South Korea	"Egotistic" (Note: Mamamoo cover) and "Hit" as a group; "You're the Best" and "Clap" with Mamamoo	
2020 FNS Music Festival	December 9, 2020	Tokyo	Japan	"Home;Run"	
2020 SBS Gayo Daejeon	December 25, 2020	Daegu	South Korea	"24H", "My My" and "Left & Right"	
2021 FNS Summer Music Festival	July 14, 2021	Tokyo	Japan	"Ready to Love"	
2021 KBS Song Festival	December 17, 2021	Seoul	South Korea	"Together" (Note: Noel cover), performed by DK and Seungkwan; "Crush", "Ready to Love" and "Rock with You"	
2022 FNS Music Festival	December 7, 2022	Tokyo	Japan	"Dream"	
2023 Best Artist Festival	December 2, 2023	Nagoya	Japan	"Ima (Even if the World Ends Tomorrow)"	
2023 FNS Music Festival	December 6, 2023	Tokyo	Japan	"Ima (Even if the World Ends Tomorrow)"	
74th NHK Kōhaku Uta Gassen	December 31, 2023	Tokyo	Japan	"Fallin' Flower"	
2024 FNS Summer Music Festival	July 3, 2024	Tokyo	Japan	"Maestro"	

== See also ==
- Seventeen videography, including recordings of various concerts and fan meetings
- Warning Tour, 2025 tour held by Hoshi and Woozi
