= Be The Sun World Tour =

2022 concert tour by Seventeen

Be The Sun Tour
- World tour by Seventeen
- Promotional poster for the tour
- Associated album: Face the Sun
- Start date: June 25, 2022
- End date: December 28, 2022
- Legs: 4
- No. of shows: 17 in Asia; 12 in North America; 29 total
- Box office: $57,087,739

Seventeen concert chronology
- Ode to You World Tour (2019); Be The Sun Tour (2022); Follow Tour (2023–2024)

The Be The Sun Tour (stylized as Seventeen World Tour Be The Sun, in all caps) was the fourth world concert tour headlined by South Korean boy group Seventeen. The tour began on June 25, 2022, at the Gocheok Sky Dome in Seoul, South Korea, and concluded on December 28, 2022, at Gelora Bung Karno Madya Stadium in Jakarta, Indonesia.

Demonstrating significant growth in Seventeen's popularity, the tour included the group's first performances at Tokyo Dome and Kyocera Dome in Japan, as well as at the world's largest indoor arena, the Philippine Arena, where they became the first K-pop act to perform.

== Background ==
Following multiple tour cancellations as a result of the COVID-19 pandemic, the Be The Sun tour marked Seventeen's return to concert tours following the release of Face the Sun in May 2022. The first announcement included stops in South Korea, Canada, and the United States, with further stops in Southeast Asia and Japan announced later.

=== Member participation ===
Shortly before the tour began, Jeonghan underwent surgery for lateral epicondylitis and tendon damage in his right elbow. He participated in the tour while wearing a cast and brace, with his participation adjusted when necessary during his recovery.

During the North American leg, several members temporarily missed concerts after testing positive for COVID-19. Dino missed the Los Angeles and Houston concerts. Mingyu missed the Houston and Fort Worth concerts. Joshua and Hoshi subsequently missed the Washington, D.C. and Atlanta concerts after also testing positive for COVID-19.

The8 was absent from the final concert in Jakarta on December 28 after experiencing flu symptoms and being advised by medical staff to rest.

== Promotion ==
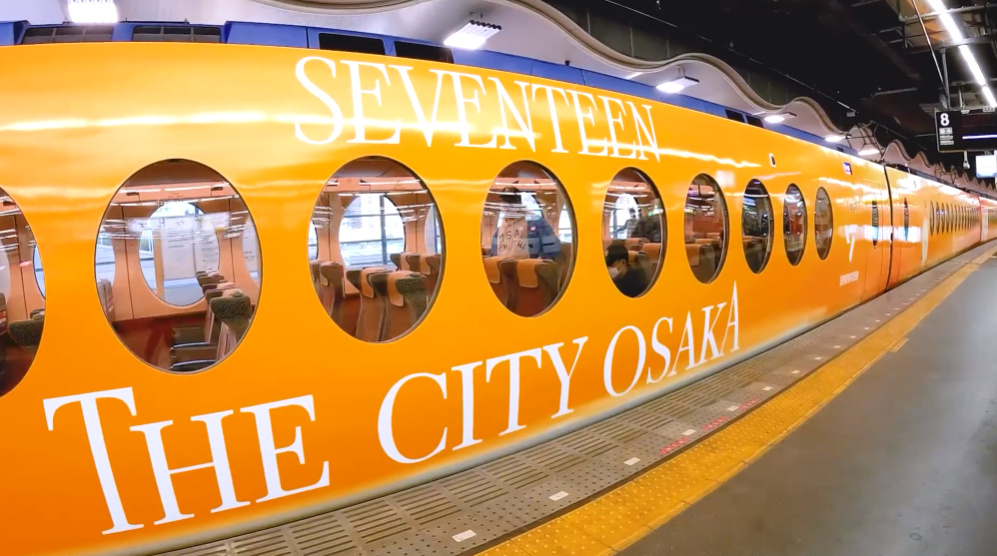
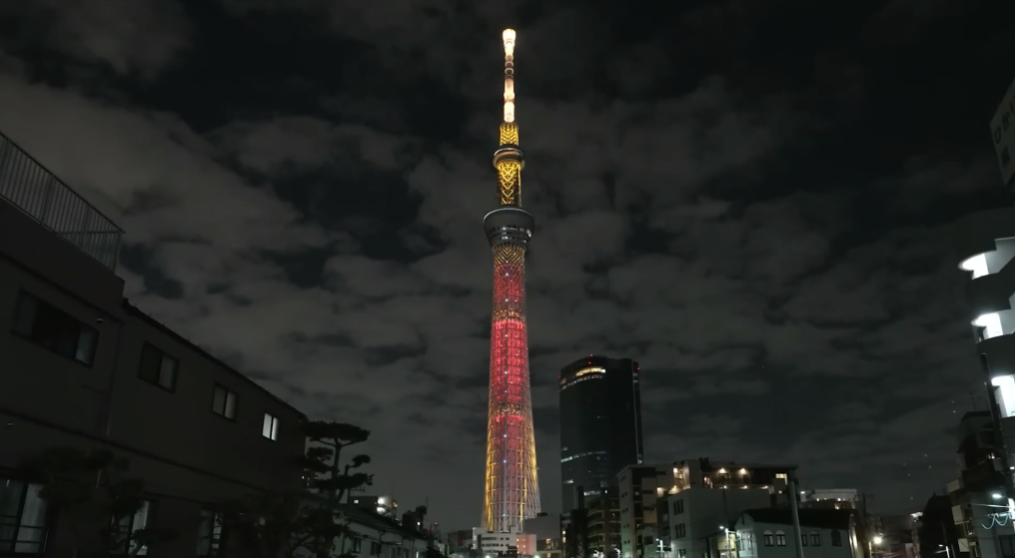
A Nankai Electric Railway train in Osaka promoting the tour (top) and Tokyo Skytree in orange lighting.

To commemorate the tour, Seventeen, Pledis Japan and Hybe Japan collaborated with local businesses and attractions to arrange activities for fans in the lead-up to the shows in Nagoya, Osaka, and Tokyo.

All three cities had events including stamp rallies, themed cafes with dishes selected by the members, and photo zones, while each city had exclusive activities based on the local attractkions. In Tokyo, the Tokyo Skytree was lit up in orange in line with the theme of the tour, alongside a pop-up store in Shibuya. In Osaka, certain trains were wrapped in orange material with the members images, and the Osaka Hep Five Ferris Wheel was also lit up in orange. In Nagoya, a laser show and photo exhibit were held for fans.

Hyunrock Han, CEO of Hybe Japan, noted that the intention of the events was not just to appeal to Seventeen fans, rather, the idea was to promote and revitalize local attractions, including larger and smaller businesses alike.

== Reception ==
Franchesca Judine Basbas reviewed the Seoul concerts for Bandwagon Asia, describing the concerts as "an insanely high precedent for what's to come", highlighting the live band and the group's energy throughout the four-hour performance. Teta Alim reviewed the concert in Washington D.C. for the Washington Post, noting that the group lived up to their reputation, making it "impossible for any bad mood to persist during their nearly three-hour set", despite two of the group's members being absent after having contracted COVID-19. Sara Delgado of Teen Vogue wrote that the group "radiated as much energy as the tour's moniker".

== Set list ==
The following set list is from the shows in Seoul, South Korea. It is not intended to represent all shows from the tour.

Act I

1. "Hot"
2. "March"
3. "Hit"
4. "Rock with you"
5. "Boom Boom"

Act II – Unit stages

6. "2 Minus 1" (Joshua and Vernon)
7. "Moonwalker" (Performance Team)
8. "Wave" (Performance Team)
9. "Come To Me" (Vocal Team)
10. "Imperfect Love" (Vocal Team)
11. "GAM3 BO1" (Hip Hop Team)
12. "Back It Up" (Hip Hop Team)

Act III

13. "Mansae"
14. "Left & Right"
15. "Very Nice"

Act IV

16. "Shadow"
17. "Ready to Love"
18. "24H"
19. "Crush"

Encore

20. "Darl+ing"
21. "Heaven's Cloud"
22. "Our Dawn Is Hotter Than Day"
23. "Snap Shoot"
24. "Very Nice"

== Tour dates ==
Key
‡	Indicates performances streamed simultaneously on Weverse Concerts
†	Indicates performances streamed simultaneously or delayed in cinemas

Concert dates
Date (2022)	City	Country	Venue	Attendance	Revenue	Ref.
June 25 ‡	Seoul	South Korea	Gocheok Sky Dome	35,000	$27,062,717	
June 26 ‡	Seoul	South Korea	Gocheok Sky Dome	35,000	$27,062,717	
August 10	Vancouver	Canada	Rogers Arena	188,013	$27,062,717	
August 12	Seattle	United States	Climate Pledge Arena	188,013	$27,062,717	
August 14	Oakland	United States	Oakland Arena	188,013	$27,062,717	
August 17	Los Angeles	United States	Kia Forum	188,013	$27,062,717	
August 20 †	Houston	United States	Toyota Center	188,013	$27,062,717	
August 23	Fort Worth	United States	Dickies Arena	188,013	$27,062,717	
August 25	Chicago	United States	United Center	188,013	$27,062,717	
August 28	Washington, D.C.	United States	Capital One Arena	188,013	$27,062,717	
August 30	Atlanta	United States	State Farm Arena	188,013	$27,062,717	
September 1	Elmont	United States	UBS Arena	188,013	$27,062,717	
September 3	Toronto	Canada	Scotiabank Arena	188,013	$27,062,717	
September 6	Newark	United States	Prudential Center	188,013	$27,062,717	
September 24	Jakarta	Indonesia	Indonesia Convention Exhibition	188,013	$27,062,717	
September 25	Jakarta	Indonesia	Indonesia Convention Exhibition	188,013	$27,062,717	
October 1	Bangkok	Thailand	Impact Challenger Hall	188,013	$27,062,717	
October 2	Bangkok	Thailand	Impact Challenger Hall	188,013	$27,062,717	
October 8	Pasay (Note: Labelled as Manila in promotional material.)	Philippines	SM Mall of Asia Arena	188,013	$27,062,717	
October 9	Pasay	Philippines	SM Mall of Asia Arena	188,013	$27,062,717	
October 13	Singapore		Singapore Indoor Stadium	188,013	$27,062,717	
November 19	Osaka	Japan	Kyocera Dome Osaka	316,859	$30,025,022	
November 20	Osaka	Japan	Kyocera Dome Osaka	316,859	$30,025,022	
November 26	Tokyo	Japan	Tokyo Dome	316,859	$30,025,022	
November 27 ‡	Tokyo	Japan	Tokyo Dome	316,859	$30,025,022	
December 3	Nagoya	Japan	Vantelin Dome Nagoya	316,859	$30,025,022	
December 4	Nagoya	Japan	Vantelin Dome Nagoya	316,859	$30,025,022	
December 17	Santa Maria	Philippines	Philippine Arena	316,859	$30,025,022	
December 28	Jakarta	Indonesia	Gelora Bung Karno Madya Stadium	316,859	$30,025,022	
Total				539,872	$57,087,739	

== See also ==
- Seventeen discography
- List of Seventeen live performances
