= Ode to You World Tour =

2019–2020 concert tour by Seventeen

- World tour by Seventeen
- Promotional poster for the Seoul shows
- Associated album: An Ode
- Start date: August 30, 2019
- End date: February 8, 2020
- Legs: 4
- No. of shows: 16 in Asia; 8 in North America; 24 total

Seventeen concert chronology
- Haru Japan Tour (2019); Ode to You World Tour (2019–2020); Be The Sun World Tour (2022)

The Ode to You World Tour (stylized as Seventeen World Tour Ode to You) was the third world concert tour headlined by South Korean boy group Seventeen, supporting their third studio album An Ode. The tour began on August 30, 2019, at the KSPO Dome in Seoul, South Korea, and concluded on February 8, 2020, at Mall of Asia Arena in Pasay, Philippines, having been cut short by the COVID-19 pandemic.

The tour was later documented in Seventeen: Hit the Road, Seventeen's first documentary series, which was released in 15 episodes on YouTube from May 15 to June 7, 2020.

== Background ==
On June 24, 2019, Seventeen announced their third world tour would be titled Ode to You, beginning with three dates in Seoul. An additional nine dates in Japan was announced five days later. The group announced a second Asian leg on August 27, a North American leg on October 19, and a European leg on December 13.

The tour started on August 30, 2019, in Seoul, South Korea, and concluded on February 8, 2020, in Pasay, Philippines. Although it was originally planned to conclude in March, multiple dates in the second Asian leg, alongside the entire European leg, were cancelled as a result of the COVID-19 pandemic. Additionally, a concert scheduled for October 12, 2019, in Nagoya, Japan, was cancelled due to Typhoon Hagibis.

=== Member participation ===
Dino was absent from the November 7, 2019 concert at Makuhari Messe after being diagnosed with enteritis and advised to rest. He had recovered by the November 16 concert in Jakarta, where all 13 members initially participated.

During the Jakarta concert, S.Coups and Jeonghan withdrew partway through the performance due to health concerns. Both had participated in the opening songs and later returned for their respective unit stages, but were unable to complete the concert.

On November 18, Pledis Entertainment announced that S.Coups would temporarily suspend activities after experiencing symptoms of anxiety and being advised to receive sufficient rest. He was consequently excluded from the ongoing Ode to You tour and did not participate in the subsequent performed dates.

Jeonghan continued participating following the Jakarta concert, but temporarily suspended all activities in December after experiencing dizziness and being advised to minimize physically demanding schedules and rest through the end of the month. He returned to public activities before the North American leg began in January 2020.

=== Documentary and home media ===
Hit the Road, a behind-the-scenes documentary series chronicling the tour, premiered on YouTube on May 15, 2020. The series offered insight into the physical and emotional demands of touring and the members' experiences behind the scenes. The series was praised for offering insight into the stressful aspects of the K-pop industry and touring. The series consisted of a prologue, 13 member-focused episodes and an epilogue, with each numbered episode centering on a different member: Woozi, Wonwoo, S.Coups, Hoshi, Mingyu, Joshua, Seungkwan, Dino, Vernon, The8, Jeonghan, Jun and DK, respectively.

A recording of the tour's opening Seoul concerts was also released on DVD in January 2020.

== Commercial performance ==
The tour's three opening concerts at KSPO Dome in Seoul sold out during fan-club presales, before tickets were made available through the general sale. The three concerts drew a combined audience of approximately 39,000.

In Japan, all nine concerts across Osaka, Aichi, Yokohama and Chiba sold out. Additional seats were subsequently released for the Yokohama and Makuhari performances.

In North America, based on 4 reported shows, Pollstar ranked Seventeen at number 76 on its 2020 year-end list of the Top 200 North American Tours. The 4 shows grossed a combined $2.64 million from 23,540 tickets sold, averaging 5,885 tickets and $661,195 in gross revenue per show, with an average ticket price of $112.35.

== Reception ==
In a review for K-Pop Herald, Hong Dam-young applauded the group for going "above and beyond" for their fans, noting that the "born entertainers were showered with sweat, but their glowing faces showed that they were truly enjoying being onstage."

== Set list ==
The following set list is from the shows in Seoul, South Korea. It is not intended to represent all shows from the tour.

Act I

1. "Getting Closer"
2. "Rock"
3. "Clap"
4. "Thanks"
5. "Home"
6. "Don't Wanna Cry"

Act II – Unit stages

7. "Trauma" (Hip Hop Team)
8. "Chilli" (Hip Hop Team)
9. "Lilili Yabbay" (Performance Team)
10. "Shhh" (Performance Team)
11. "Hug" (Vocal Team)
12. "Don't Listen In Secret" (Vocal Team)

Act III

13. "Smile Flower"
14. "Adore U"
15. "Pretty U"
16. "Oh My!"
17. "Just Do It"

Act IV

18. "Crazy In Love"
19. "Good to Me"
20. "Happy Ending" (Korean Version)
21. "Hit"

Encore

22. "Campfire" (by fans)
23. "9-Teen"
24. "Holiday"
25. "Very Nice"

== Tour dates ==
Concert dates
Date	City	Country	Venue	Attendance	Revenue
August 30, 2019	Seoul	South Korea	KSPO Dome	39,000	—N/a
August 31, 2019	Seoul	South Korea	KSPO Dome	39,000	—N/a
September 1, 2019	Seoul	South Korea	KSPO Dome	39,000	—N/a
October 8, 2019	Osaka	Japan	Osaka-jō Hall	130,000	—N/a
October 9, 2019	Osaka	Japan	Osaka-jō Hall	130,000	—N/a
October 13, 2019	Nagoya	Japan	Aichi Sky Expo Hall A	130,000	—N/a
October 14, 2019	Nagoya	Japan	Aichi Sky Expo Hall A	130,000	—N/a
October 30, 2019	Yokohama	Japan	Yokohama Arena	130,000	—N/a
October 31, 2019	Yokohama	Japan	Yokohama Arena	130,000	—N/a
November 7, 2019	Chiba	Japan	Makuhari Messe	130,000	—N/a
November 8, 2019	Chiba	Japan	Makuhari Messe	130,000	—N/a
November 9, 2019	Chiba	Japan	Makuhari Messe	130,000	—N/a
November 16, 2019	Jakarta	Indonesia	Istora Senayan	—N/a	—N/a
November 23, 2019	Bangkok	Thailand	Thunder Dome	—N/a	—N/a
November 24, 2019	Bangkok	Thailand	Thunder Dome	—N/a	—N/a
January 10, 2020	Newark	United States	Prudential Center	—N/a	—N/a
January 12, 2020	Chicago	United States	United Center	—N/a	—N/a
January 14, 2020	Dallas	United States	Toyota Music Factory (Pavilion)	—N/a	—N/a
January 15, 2020	Houston	United States	Smart Financial Centre	—N/a	—N/a
January 17, 2020	Mexico City	Mexico	Palacio de los Deportes	7,233	$768,868
January 19, 2020	Los Angeles	United States	The Forum	—N/a	—N/a
January 21, 2020	San Jose	United States	SAP Center	—N/a	—N/a
January 23, 2020	Seattle	United States	ShoWare Center	—N/a	—N/a
February 8, 2020	Pasay (Note: Labelled as Manila in promotional material.)	Philippines	Mall of Asia Arena	—N/a	—N/a
Total				176,233	—

List of cancelled dates

Date	City	Country	Venue	Reason
October 12, 2019	Nagoya	Japan	Aichi Sky Expo Hall A	Typhoon Hagibis
February 22, 2020	Kuala Lumpur	Malaysia	Axiata Arena	COVID-19
February 29, 2020	Taoyuan	Taiwan	NTSU Arena	COVID-19
March 3, 2020	Madrid	Spain	WiZink Center	COVID-19
March 5, 2020	Paris	France	La Seine Musicale	COVID-19
March 8, 2020	London	England	The SSE Arena	COVID-19
March 10, 2020	Berlin	Germany	Mercedes-Benz Arena	COVID-19

== See also ==
- Seventeen discography
- List of Seventeen live performances
