= Very Nice =

2016 single by Seventeen

- Promotional graphic

Single by Seventeen

from the album Love & Letter Repackage Album
- Language: Korean
- Released: July 4, 2016
- Genre: K-pop
- Length: 3:12
- Label: Pledis
- Composers: Woozi; Bumzu
- Lyricists: Woozi; Bumzu; S.Coups; Vernon

Seventeen singles chronology
"Pretty U" (2016)	"Very Nice" (2016)	"Boom Boom" (2016)

Music video
- "Very Nice" on YouTube

"Very Nice", also commonly known by its Korean title "Aju Nice" (아주 Nice; Aju Naiseu), is a song by South Korean boy group Seventeen. It was released as the lead single from the reissue of their debut studio album Love & Letter on July 4, 2016. Despite initially peaking at only 22 on South Korea's Gaon Chart and winning no music show awards, "Very Nice" is now considered to be one of Seventeen's signature songs and has placed in multiple lists of best K-pop songs domestically and internationally.

== Background and release ==
"Pretty U" came about after I kept thinking and thinking and thinking, but I think "Very Nice" was decided on from the time it was a guide. I was thinking about changing it because it was a guide, but then I said, "it's 'Very Nice', isn't it?"

— Woozi on the song's production, News1

On April 26, 2016, Seventeen released their first studio album Love & Letter, having debuted the year earlier. "Pretty U", the lead single for Love & Letter earned the group their first win on a music show, with two consecutive wins at Show Champion.

On June 25, Seventeen announced the reissue of their first studio album, to be released on July 4. The tracklist was released on July 27, with "Very Nice" serving as the lead single. A teaser for the music video was released on July 1.

== Composition ==
"Very Nice" was written by Seventeen members Woozi, S.Coups, and Vernon, alongside regular Seventeen collaborator Bumzu, and was composed by Woozi and Bumzu. Speaking about the track, Bumzu stated that he had worked on it for 48 hours, only speaking to Woozi during that time. He also mentioned that S.Coups proposed the idea of using the phrase "Very Nice".

The song has been described as a "high-octane anthem", with the use of "circus-like horns, ramped-up crowd cheers, and even random slurping noises". It was written in the key of D♯ minor with a tempo of 122 beats per minute.

== Music video ==
The music video was released on the same day as the album release, July 4, and was directed by South Korean video production company Digipedi, whom Seventeen previously worked with for the music video of "Q&A" with Ailee. It depicts the group experiencing the exciting phase of liking someone during their youth, with scenes at a school, a basketball court, and a boxing ring. Throughout the video, confetti and flower petals explode from the members, portraying the intensity of adolescent love. In the dance scenes, the group wears white shirts with suspenders, with "upbeat" and "well-coordinated" choreography, which Hoshi and the members took part in creating.

Within one week, the video had accumulated more than five million views on YouTube. In 2022, it became Seventeen's third music video to pass 100 million views on the platform, after the music videos for "Don't Wanna Cry" and "Clap", six years after it was released.

== Reception ==
Professional ratings
Review scores
Source	Rating
IZM	2.5/5 stars

IZM's Hong Eun-sol wrote that although the members "sing expressively as if they were acting", the song felt "somewhat disappointing" after the precedent set by "Pretty U". Nevertheless, Hong noted that it was encouraging to see Seventeen establishing their unique style. In contrast, online Korean magazine Kultscene featured "Very Nice" on their list of the 50 best songs of 2016 at number 15, noting it as the group's best song that year. Alexis of Kultscene noted that "while 'Pretty U' was a lovely song [...] 'Very Nice' is like taking a big bite out of a cotton candy ice cream on a summer day. It's sugary, it's big, and it's fantastic."

The song remains Seventeen's highest entry on Billboard's World Digital Song Sales chart at number two, as of June 2024. It peaked at number 22 on the Gaon Digital Chart during its release week. "Very Nice" often re-enters South Korean real-time music charts in conjunction with new Seventeen releases, having charted at number 123 next to the release of "Fighting", as well as charting within the top 100 after the release of "Left & Right".

=== Legacy ===
"Think of an Irish goodbye – but instead of trying to leave unnoticed, you leave very noticeably by pretending to say bye and then returning to perform a full chorus of a song. Six times to be exact."

— Ethan Millman and Jeanette Diaz, Rolling Stone

Part of the song's legacy is its place in Seventeen's encore performances. Following final speeches at a concert, Seventeen have become known to perform "Very Nice" on repeat, any amount of times from six to fifteen times, occasionally taking breaks to encourage fans to sing the lyrics, or lie on the floor, "begging to leave the stage". The encore has been dubbed as a "never-ending Aju Nice" and is often regarded to be a highlight of Seventeen's performances.

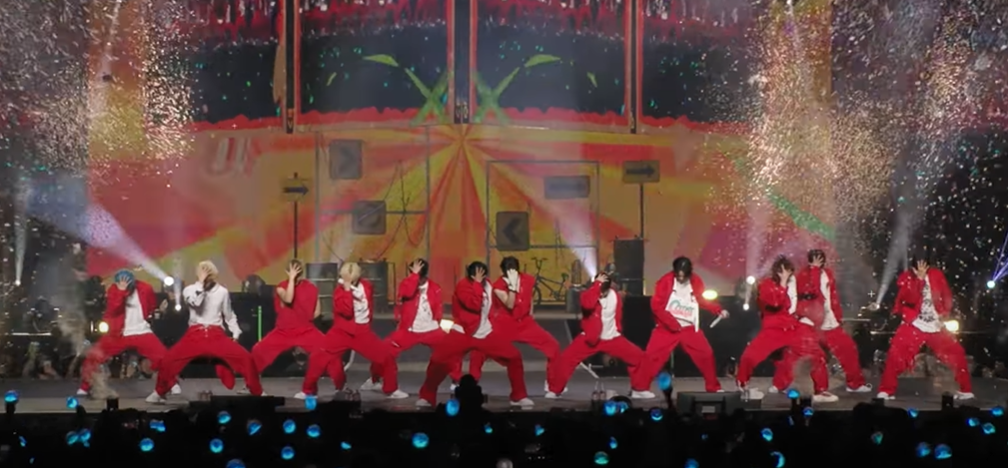
Seventeen performing "Very Nice" during the Be The Sun World Tour in 2022

Numerous other K-Pop groups have covered "Very Nice". Most notably, girl group Nmixx performed a cover at KCON LA in 2022. In 2020, BAE173's Dohyon covered "Very Nice" to introduce himself for his MC role on The Show. Mamamoo and Golden Child have also performed covers. In 2023, "Very Nice" was featured on MNET competition show Boys Planet as a battle mission for two teams to sing.

In 2021, South Korean music streaming service Melon ranked "Very Nice" at number 80 on their list of the top 100 K-Pop songs of all time. In 2023, Rolling Stone placed "Very Nice" at number 68 on their own list of the 100 best Korean pop songs of all time, crediting the song for cementing the group as leaders of "the sweet, bubbly, boy-group concept". Billboard included "Very Nice" at number 15 in their best K-pop songs of the 2010s list. Carmen Chin ranked "Very Nice" at 54 in NME's ranking of Seventeen's discography in 2024, describing that its encore tradition at concerts had skewed her perception of the "K-pop classic".

"Very Nice" on select listicles
Publication	Year	List	Rank	Ref.
Billboard	2019	100 Greatest K-Pop Songs of the 2010s	15	
Billboard	2025	Seventeen's 10 Best Songs So Far: Critic's Picks	2	
Melon	2021	Top 100 K-pop Songs of All Time	80	
NME	2024	Every Seventeen song ranked in order of greatness	54	
Rolling Stone	2023	100 Greatest Songs in the History of Korean Pop Music	68	

== Credits and personnel ==
Credits adapted from the Love & Letter Repackage Album lyric book.

Location

- Recorded and mixed at Pledis Studio

Credits and personnel

- Bumzu – lyrics, composition, arrangement, chorus, recording
- Woozi – lyrics, composition
- S.Coups – lyrics
- Vernon – lyrics
- Seungkwan – chorus
- Park Ki-tae – guitar
- Jo Ja-young – string arrangement
- Kim Dae-young – recording, mixing

== Charts ==
=== Weekly charts ===
Weekly chart performance for "Very Nice"
Chart (2016)	Peak position
South Korea (Gaon)	22
US World Digital Song Sales (Billboard)	2

=== Monthly charts ===
Monthly chart performance for "Very Nice"
Chart (2016)	Position
South Korea (Gaon)	41

== Certifications ==
Certifications for "Very Nice"
Region	Certification	Certified units/sales
Streaming
Japan (RIAJ)	Platinum	100,000,000^{†}
^{†} Streaming-only figures based on certification alone.
