= After School discography =

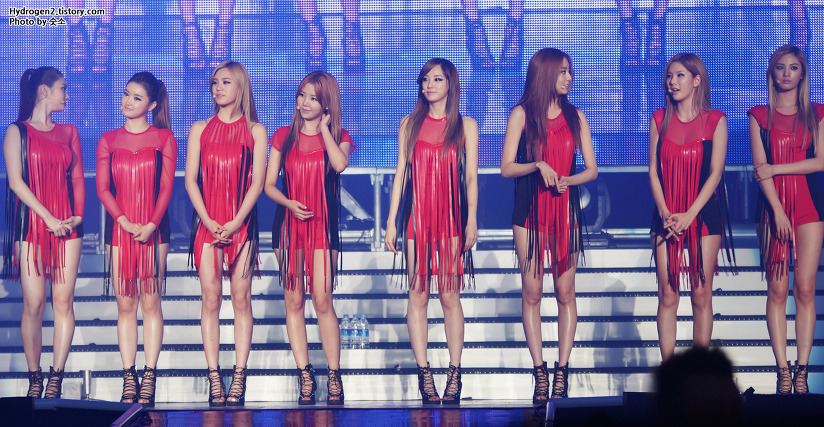
- After School in July 2012
- Studio albums: 3
- Compilation albums: 2
- Singles: 17
- Video albums: 1
- Music videos: 26

The discography of South Korean girl group After School consists of three studio albums, eight single albums, thirteen singles, five soundtrack contributions, twenty three videos and eight promotional singles.

After School debuted in 2009 with the release of their single "Ah" and the single album New Schoolgirl. In April 2009, following the addition of new member Uee, the group released the digital single "Diva", which won the Cyworld Digital Music Award for Rookie of the Month. Seven months later, following the departure of Soyoung and the additions of Raina and Nana, the group released their second single album, Because of You, with the digital single "Diva" being included as a b-side. "Because of You" became the group's first and only number 1 single on the Gaon Digital Chart. The song was the best selling single of December 2009 in South Korea. (Note: The Gaon Chart was not established until 2010, however by viewing the monthly chart of January 2010, "Because of You" is ranked 30 (down 29), indicating that it was the number 1 song of December 2009.) "Because of You" was then remixed and promoted briefly in the beginning of 2010. After School then promoted the b-side "When I Fall" from the Because of You album in February 2010, before concluding promotions for the single album.

The group's third single album, Bang!, was released on March 25, 2010, with both the title track and the single album peaking at number 2 on the Gaon Music Chart. The single sold over 2 million copies during 2010. Following a short hiatus, the group released their first charity single Happy Pledis 1st Album in December 2010. The album's lead single, "Love Love Love" peaked at number 8 on the Gaon Digital Chart, with the album peaking at number 2.

In 2011, After School began their venture into the Japanese music market. The group, minus Bekah, collaborated with Namie Amuro for her collaboration album Checkmate!. The song charted at number 73 on the Billboard Japan Hot 100 and at number 10 on the RIAJ Digital Track Chart. Shortly after, the group released their first studio album in Korea titled Virgin. The lead single, "Shampoo", charted at number 4 on the Gaon Digital Chart whilst its parent album charted at number 2 on the Gaon Album Chart. Following promotions for their first Korean studio album, the group released their fourth single album "Red" / "Blue", which saw the group split into two subunits "After School Red" and "After School Blue". After School Red's lead single "In the Night Sky" charted at number 9 on the Gaon Digital Chart whilst After School Blue's lead single, "Wonder Boy", charted at number 15. The following month, the group released their debut single in Japan, which was a Japanese remake of their Korean single "Bang!". The song peaked at number 7 on the Oricon Singles Chart. The group's second Japanese single, a remake of "Diva", was released in November of that year and charted at number 12 on the Oricon Singles Chart. The group rounded off the year by participating in Pledis Entertainment's second charity single, Happy Pledis 2nd Album, along with label-mates Son Dam-bi and NU'EST, who were then referred to as Pledis Boyz.

After School's first double A-side single, "Rambling Girls/Because of You", was released in Japan at the beginning of 2012. Following the release of these singles, the group's debut studio album in Japan, Playgirlz (2012) was released, peaking at number 8 on the Oricon Albums Chart. The group then released their second double A-side single in Japan in June 2012, "Lady Luck/Dilly Dally", and it became their highest charting single in Japan, peaking at number 6. A week later, following leader Kahi's departure, the group returned to South Korea for the release of their fifth single album "Flashback". The album peaked at number 3 whilst the single peaked at number 14 on the Gaon Digital Chart.

The group's first greatest hits album was released in March 2013, along with a DVD of their first Japanese tour. After School's final Korean single before the departure of most of its members, "First Love", was released in June 2013. This was followed by a return to the Japanese music market with the releases of "Heaven" (2013) and "Shh" (2014) followed by their second Japanese studio album, and third overall, Dress to Kill (2014). The group then released their second greatest hits album in Japan, Best (2015). The greatest hits album was the final release promoted by the group before a hiatus.

== Albums ==
=== Studio albums ===
List of studio albums, with selected chart positions and sales figures
Title	Album details	Peak chart positions		Sales
Title	Album details	KOR	JPN	Sales
Virgin	Released: April 29, 2011 (KOR); Label: Pledis Entertainment; Format: CD, digital download, streaming	2	162	KOR: 31,084
Playgirlz	Released: March 14, 2012 (JPN); Label: Avex Trax; Format: CD, digital download, streaming	—	8	JPN: 28,489
Dress to Kill	Released: March 19, 2014 (JPN); Label: Avex Trax; Format: CD, digital download, streaming	—	33	JPN: 4,252
"—" denotes releases that did not chart or were not released in that region.

=== Compilation albums ===
List of compilation albums with selected chart positions and sales figures
Title	Album details	Peak chart positions	Sales
Title	Album details	JPN	Sales
The Best of After School 2009–2012: Korea Ver.	Released: March 27, 2013 (JPN); Label: Pledis Entertainment, Avex Trax; Format: CD, digital download, streaming	40	JPN: 3,750
Best	Released: March 18, 2015 (JPN); Label: Avex Trax; Format: CD, digital download, streaming	19	
"—" denotes releases that did not chart or were not released in that region.

== Single albums ==
Title	Album details	Peak chart positions	Sales
Title	Album details	KOR	Sales
New Schoolgirl	Released: January 15, 2009; Label: Pledis Entertainment; Format: CD, digital download, streaming	5	
Because of You	Released: November 25, 2009; Label: Pledis Entertainment; Format: CD, digital download, streaming	2 (Note: The Gaon Chart was not established until 2010, however by viewing the weekly chart of the first week of January 2010, "Because of You" is ranked 2 on the Album Chart and 1 on the Digital Chart, making it its peak rank on the charts.)	
Bang!	Released: March 25, 2010; Label: Pledis Entertainment; Format: CD, digital download, streaming	2	KOR: 15,914
Happy Pledis 1st Album	Released: December 7, 2010; Label: Pledis Entertainment; Format: CD, digital download, streaming	2	
Red	Released: July 20, 2011; Label: Pledis Entertainment; Format: CD, digital download, streaming	21	KOR: 12,085
Blue	Released: July 20, 2011; Label: Pledis Entertainment; Format: CD, digital download, streaming	18	KOR: 10,618
Happy Pledis 2nd Album	Released: December 1, 2011; Label: Pledis Entertainment; Format: CD, digital download, streaming	4	KOR: 6,789
Flashback	Released: June 20, 2012; Label: Pledis Entertainment; Format: CD, digital download, streaming	3	KOR: 16,885
First Love	Released: June 13, 2013; Label: Pledis Entertainment; Format: CD, digital download, streaming	11	KOR: 13,563
"—" denotes releases that did not chart or were not released in that region.

== Singles ==
=== As lead artist ===
List of singles as lead artist, with selected chart positions, showing year released and album name
Title	Year	Peak chart positions				Sales (Note: Sales figures for tracks are based on digital downloads, except noted.)	Album
Title	Year	KOR	KOR Hot	JPN	JPN Hot	Sales	Album
Korean
"Ah"	2009	—	—	—	—		New Schoolgirl
"Diva"	2009	—	—	—	—		Because Of You
"Because of You" (너 때문에)	2009	6	—	—	—	KOR: 1,514,728 (Note: The download sales for "Because of You" are from 2010 only as Gaon did not begin providing sales information until 2010.)	Because Of You
"Bang!" (뱅!)	2010	2	—	—	—	KOR: 2,374,731	Bang!
"Love Love Love"	2010	8	—	—	—		Happy Pledis 1st Album
"Shampoo"	2011	4	—	—	—	KOR: 1,614,918	Virgin
"In the Night Sky" (밤 하늘에) (Note: A.S. Red was a special unit composed of Kahi, Jungah, Uee and Nana.)	2011	9	—	—	—	KOR: 1,514,202	Red
"Wonder Boy" (Note: A.S. Blue was a special unit composed of Jooyeon, Raina, Lizzy, and E-Young.)	2011	15	—	—	—	KOR: 1,087,842	Blue
"Flashback"	2012	14	10	—	—	KOR: 1,044,540	Flashback
"First Love" (첫사랑)	2013	7	7	—	—	KOR: 596,036	First Love
Japanese
"Bang!"	2011	—	—	7	10	JPN: 42,363	Playgirlz
"Diva"	2011	—	—	12	26	JPN: 17,448	Playgirlz
"Rambling Girls"	2012	—	—	7	24	JPN: 17,029	Playgirlz
"Because of You"	2012	—	—	7	—	JPN: 17,029	Playgirlz
"Lady Luck"	2012	—	—	6	20	JPN: 17,572	Lady Luck / Dilly Dally
"Dilly Dally"	2012	—	—	6	—	JPN: 17,572	Lady Luck / Dilly Dally
"Heaven"	2013	—	—	7	28	JPN: 19,884	Dress to Kill
"Shh"	2014	—	—	12	—	JPN: 16,483	Dress to Kill
"—" denotes releases that did not chart or were not released in that region.

=== As featured artist ===
List of singles as a featured artist, with selected chart positions, showing year released and album name
Title	Year	Peak chart positions				Sales	Album
Title	Year	KOR	KOR Hot	JPN Hot	JPN RIAJ	Sales	Album
"Love Letter" (with Son Dam Bi and various artists)	2011	37	43	—	—	KOR: 456,293	Happy Pledis 2nd Album
"Make It Happen" (Namie Amuro feat. After School)	2011	—	—	73	10		Checkmate!
"—" denotes releases that did not chart or were not released in that region.

=== Promotional singles ===
List of promotional singles, with selected chart positions, showing year released and album name
Title	Year	Peak chart positions		Sales	Album
Title	Year	KOR	KOR Hot	Sales	Album
Korean
"Dream Girl"	2009	—	—		Non-album singles
"Amoled" (with Son Dam Bi)	2009	—	—		Non-album singles
"Nun Naerineun Maeul" (Snowy Village) (with various artists)	2009	—	—		Non-album singles
"Because of You" (Remix)	2010	76	—		Non-album singles
"When I Fall"	2010	98	—		Non-album singles
"Dreams Again!"	2010	68	—		The Shouts Of Reds. United Korea
"Play Ur Love"	2011	—	—		Virgin
"Week" (일주일)	2014	40	35	KOR: 109,125	Non-album single
Japanese
"Just in time"	2012	—	—		Playgirlz
"Ms.Independent"	2014	—	—		Dress to Kill
"Shine"	2014	—	—		Best
"—" denotes releases that did not chart or were not released in that region.

== Soundtrack appearances ==
List of soundtracks, with selected chart positions, showing year released and album name
Title	Year	Peak chart positions		Sales	Album
Title	Year	KOR	KOR Hot	Sales	Album
"Half" (반쪽) (Sunny Side feat. After School)	2009	—	—		Tamra, the Island OST
"Have You Forgotten?" (잊었나)	2011	38	56	KOR: 253,679	Lights and Shadows OST
"—" denotes releases that did not chart or were not released in that region.

== Other charted songs ==
List of songs, with selected chart positions, showing year released and album name
Title	Year	Peak chart positions		Album
Title	Year	KOR	KOR Hot	Album
"Let's Do It!"	2010	127	—	"Bang!" (single)
"With U"	2010	71	—	"Bang!" (single)
"Someone Is You"	2010	123	—	"Love Love Love" (single)
"Virgin"	2011	181	—	Virgin
"Hollywood"	2011	117	—	"Red & Blue" (single)
"Lady"	2011	114	—	"Red & Blue" (single)
"Rip Off"	2012	178	—	"Flashback" (single)
"Eyeline"	2012	191	—	"Flashback" (single)
"8 Hot Girl"	2013	—	44	"First Love" (single)
"Time's Up"	2013	160	—	"First Love" (single)
"—" denotes releases that did not chart or were not released in that region.

== Other appearances ==
Year	Title	Album
2009	"Spring Chicken Soup" (with Jung Joon Ha)	Olympic Duet Song Festival

== Video albums ==
=== DVDs ===
Title	Album details	Peak chart positions	Sales
Title	Album details	JPN	Sales
First Japan Tour 2012 - Playgirlz	Released: March 27, 2013; Language: Japanese; Label: Avex Trax; Format: Blu-ray, DVD	43 (Blu-ray); 63 (DVD)	JPN: 1,680+
"—" denotes releases that did not chart or were not released in that region.

=== Music videos ===
Year	Title	Notes
2009	"Ah!"	Debut
2009	"Diva"	Uee joins as a new member
2009	"Dream Girl"	
2009	"Amoled"	With Son Dambi for promotion of Samsung's Amoled phone. Final appearance of So-young
2009	"Because of You"	Raina and Nana join as new members
2010	"Lets Do It!"	Lizzy joins as a new member
2010	"Bang!"	
2010	"Dreams Again!"	2010 World Cup Song
2010	"Love Love Love"	Without Bekah
2011	"Make It Happen"	With Namie Amuro. E-Young joins as a new member
2011	"Shampoo"	Final music video with Bekah before her graduation
2011	"Let's Step Up"	Without Bekah despite still being in the group
2011	"Play Ur Love"	Kahi, Jungah, Raina and Nana
2011	"Wonder Boy"	A.S Blue
2011	"In The Night Sky"	A.S Red
2011	"Bang!"	Japanese Version; Other version: Dance Edit Version
2011	"Diva"	Japanese Version; Other version: Dance Edit Version
2011	"Tap Slap"	A different version of Diva (Japanese Version) featuring a tap dancing routine
2011	"Love Letter"	As part of 'Happy Pledis'
2012	"Rambling Girls"	1st original Japanese title track Other version: Dance Edit Version
2012	"Lady Luck"	Final music video with Kahi before her graduation and 2nd original Japanese title track
2012	"Flashback"	Kaeun joins as a new member. First Korean comeback in 2012 without Kahi
2013	"First Love"	First comeback with no members 'entering' or 'graduating'
2013	"Heaven"	3rd original Japanese title track
2013	"Shh"	4th original Japanese title track Other version: Dance Edit Version
2015	"Shine"	Final music video with Jooyeon, Jungah, Uee, Raina, Lizzy, Eyoung, & Kaeun before graduating
