= List of songs recorded by After School =

Below is a complete list of songs by the Korean girl group After School.

== 0–9 ==
Song	Writer	Album	Year
"8 Hot Girl"	MABOOS	First Love (single)	2013

== A ==
Song	Writer	Album	Year
"AH"	Brave Brothers	New Schoolgirl (single)	2009
"Are You Doing Okay?"	Hwang Sung Jin	Virgin	2011

== B ==
Song	Writer	Album	Year	Other versions
"Bad Guy"	Brave Brothers	New Schoolgirl (single)	2009	—
"Bang!"	Kim Hee Sun, Bekah	Virgin	2010	2011 New recording; Japanese version
"Because of You"	Brave Brothers	Virgin	2009	Remix version; 2011 New recording; Japanese version
"Broken Heart"	Kaji Katsura	Playgirlz	2012	—

== C ==
Song	Writer	Album	Year
"Crazy Driver"	Lubo (da Hookchild) Slavicek	Dress to Kill	2013
"Crying While Putting Makeup On"	Nam Minseol	First Love (single)	2013

== D ==
Song	Writer	Album	Year	Other versions
"Dilly Dally"	Reika Yuki	Lady Luck/Dilly Dally (single)	2012	—
"Diva"	Brave Brothers	Because of You (single)	2009	Japanese version; 2011 New recording
"Dream"	Kim Hee Sun	Virgin	2011	—
"Dress Code ~Theme of 'Dress to kill'~"	—	Dress to Kill	2014	—
"Dress to Kill"	Reika Yuuki	Dress to Kill	2014	—
"Dressing Room"	Nam Minseol	First Love (single)	2013	—

== E ==
Song	Writer	Album	Year
"Eyeline"	Min Sul	Flashback (single)	2012

== F ==
Song	Writer	Album	Year	Other versions
"First Love"	Brave Brothers	First Love (single)	2013	—
"Flashback"	TEXU	Flashback (single)	2012	Japanese version; Otogloid Remix
"Funky Man"	Chang Chun Ho, Hyun Sik Gong	Virgin	2011	—

== G ==
Song	Writer	Album	Year
"Gimme Love"	Harumi	Playgirlz	2012

== H ==
Song	Writer	Album	Year	Other versions
"Heaven"	Mutsumi	Dress to Kill	2013	Shinichi Osawa Remix
"Hollywood"		Red (single)	2011	—

== I ==
Song	Writer	Album	Year
"In The Moonlight"	Kaji Katsura	Dress to Kill	2014
"In The Night Sky"	Brave Brothers	Red (single)	2011

== J ==
Song	Writer	Album	Year
"Just in time"	Hanai	Playgirlz	2012

== K ==
Song	Writer	Album	Year
"Killing Eyes ~End of 'Dress to kill'~"	—	Dress to Kill	2014

== L ==
Song	Writer	Album	Year
"Lady"		Blue (single)	2011
"Lady Luck"	Reika Yuki	Lady Luck/Dilly Dally (single)	2012
"Leaning Against Time"	Young Shin Cho	Virgin	2011
"Let's Do It!"	—	Bang! (single)	2010
"Let's Step Up"	Bekah	Virgin	2011
"Love Beat"	Nam Minseol	First Love (single)	2013
"Love Love Love"	Raina	Happy Pledis (single)	2010
"Lucky Girl"	Kaji Katsura	Dress to Kill	2014

== M ==
Song	Writer	Album	Year
"Make It Happen" (with Namie Amuro)	Double, Jörgen Elofsson, Erik Lidbom, Bonnie McKee	Checkmate!	2011
"Miss Futuristic"	Shoko Fujibayashi	Playgirlz	2012
"Ms.Independent"	Kanata Okajima	Dress to Kill	2014
"My Bell"	Song Yang Ha	Virgin	2011

== P ==
Song	Writer	Album	Year
"Play Girlz"	Brave Brothers	New Schoolgirl (single)	2009
"Play Ur Love"	Kim Bo Ah	Virgin	2011

== R ==
Song	Writer	Album	Year	Other versions
"Rambling Girls"	Harumi	Playgirlz	2012	—
"Ready to Love"		Diva (single)	2011	—
"Rip Off"	H.U.B.	Playgirlz	2012	Korean version
"Rock It!"	Kaji Katsura	Dress to Kill	2014	—

== S ==
Song	Writer	Album	Year	Other versions
"Shampoo"	Won Tae Yeon	Virgin	2011	Radio edit; Japanese version
"Shh"	Kyasu Morizuki	Dress to Kill	2014	—
"Slow Love"		Lady Luck/Dilly Dally (single)	2012	—
"Someone is You"	Kahi	Happy Pledis (single)	2010	—
"Spotlight"	Kyasu Morizuki	Dress to Kill	2014	—
"Super Sexy"		Bang! (single)	2011	—
Yuki no Hana (雪の華 / Snow Flower)	Ryouki Matsumoto, Satomi	Japanese Special Release	2012	—

== T ==
Song	Writer	Album	Year
"Tell me"	Kanata Okajima	Playgirlz	2012
"Timeless"	Raina	Flashback (single)	2012
"Time's Up"	Iggy, Seo YoungBae, DJ R2	First Love (single)	2013
"Triangle"	Kyasu Morizuki	Dress to Kill	2014

== V ==
Song	Writer	Album	Year
"Virgin"	Jang Ji-Won, Bekah	Virgin	2011

== W ==
Song	Writer	Album	Year	Other versions
"When I Fall"	Kahi	Virgin	2009	2011 New recording
"Winter's Tale" (with Son Dam Bi)		Happy Pledis 2012 'Love Letter'	2011	—
"With U"	Kahi	Bang! (single)	2010	—
"Wonder Boy"		Blue (single)	2011	—
"Wristwatch"	Kim Hyunah	Flashback (single)	2012	—

== Y ==
Song	Writer	Album	Year
"Yes No Yes"	Kanata Okajima	Dress to Kill	2014

== Other songs ==
Song	Album	Year
"Amoled" (with Son Dam Bi)	None	2009
"Beautiful Girl	All My Love	2011
"Dream Girl"	VS Tokyo Girls	2009
"Dreams Again!"	The Shouts Of Reds. United Korea (Repackage)	2010
"Half" (featuring Sunny Side)	Tamra, the Island OST	2009
"Have You Forgotten?"	Lights and Shadows OST	2011
"Love Letter" (with Son Dam Bi & Pledis Boys)	Happy Pledis 2012 'Love Letter'	2011
"Shining Girl"	My Shining Girl OST	2011
"Sok Sok Sok" (featuring JR of NU'EST)	Le Coq Golf Collaboration	2011
"Spring Chicken Soup" (with Jung Joon Ha)	Olympic Duet Song Festival	2009
"Take Me to the Place"	Take Me to the Place	2011
"You're Cute"	Pasta OST	2010

== See also ==
- After School discography
