= Best (After School album) =

BEST

Greatest hits album by After School
- Released: March 18, 2015
- Recorded: 2012–14
- Genre: Dance-pop
- Label: Avex Trax

After School chronology
Dress to Kill (2014)	BEST (2015)

Singles from Best
- 1. "Shine" Released: November 19, 2014

BEST is the second compilation Japanese album by South Korean girl group After School released on March 18, 2015 under Avex Trax. The album contains all of After School's Japanese singles. The limited edition comes in two versions with a DVD featuring After School 2nd Japan Tour Dress To Shine and also a DVD featuring all of After School's Japanese music videos up to 2014. The regular edition comes in CD-only version.

== Track listing ==
All editions:
No.	Title	Lyrics	Producer(s)	Length
1.	"Bang!"	Kim Hee Sun, Bekah	Kim Tae Hyun, Mordney Present	3:21
2.	"Diva"	Brave Brothers	Brave Brothers	3:23
3.	"Rambling girls"	Harumi	Ano Bhagavan, Peter Wennerberg, Mathias Venge, Gary Jangfeldt	3:29
4.	"Because of You" (너 때문에)	Brave Brothers	Brave Brothers	4:01
5.	"Just In Time"	Hanai	Yusuke Itagaki	3:30
6.	"Lady Luck"	Reika Yuki	Pessi Levanto, Kyösti Salokorpi, Jun Suyama	3:31
7.	"Dilly Dally"	Reika Yuki	Henrik Nordenback, Christian Fast	3:34
8.	"Slow Love"	Kato Kenn	Watanabe Yasushi	4:22
9.	"Heaven"	Mutsumi	Shinichi Osawa	4.44
10.	"Shh"	Kyasu Morizuki	Shinichi Osawa	4:58
11.	"Ms.Independent"	Kanata Okajima	Albi Albertsson, Johanna Elkesdotter	3:39
12.	"Shine"	Kanata Okajima	Christian Fast, Didrik Thott, Sebastian Thott	3.37
13.	"Bang! (Alternate Version)"
14.	"Diva (Alternate Version)"
15.	"Because of you (Alternate Version)"

DVD Japan Tour 2014 - Dress to Shine : Live in Laforet Museum Roppongi
No.	Title	Length
1.	"My Copycat (Orange Caramel)"
2.	"Mahou Shoujo (Orange Caramel)"
3.	"Catallena (Orange Caramel)"
4.	"Dress Code"
5.	"Ms.Independent"
6.	"FLASHBACK"
7.	"Triangle"
8.	"Shh"
9.	"Rock it!"
10.	"Genki Deshou"
11.	"When I Fall"
12.	"Dress to Kill"
13.	"In the moonlight"
14.	"Heaven"
15.	"Diva"
16.	"Bang!"
17.	"Because of You"
18.	"Lucky Girl"
19.	"SHINE"
20.	"LOVE LOVE LOVE"
21.	"Tell me"

DVD (Music Video)
No.	Title	Length
1.	"Let's Do it!"
2.	"Bang!"
3.	"Tap slap"
4.	"Diva"
5.	"Rambling girls"
6.	"Just in time"
7.	"Lady Luck"
8.	"Dilly Dally (Live)"
9.	"Heaven"
10.	"Shh"
11.	"Ms.Independent (Live)"
12.	"SHINE (Lyric Video)"
13.	"Shine (Behind The Scene)"

CD only edition:
No.	Title	Length
1.	"Just In Time (Alternate Version)"
2.	"Tell me (Alternate Version)"
3.	"Heaven (Shinichi Osawa REMIX)"
4.	"FLASHBACK (OTOGLIOD REMIX)"

Mu-mo edition
No.	Title	Length
1.	"Afterschool Gakuensai 2014 Houkago-hen at Stellar Ball: 1. "Ms.Independent"; 2. "FLASHBACK"; 3. "Shh"; 4. "Heaven"; 5. "rock it 6. "Diva""
2.	"Jugyou-hen Digest"
3.	"Dressing Room Girl Talk"

== Release history ==
Region	Date	Label	Format	Catalog
Japan	March 18, 2015	Avex Trax	CD+Live DVD Limited Edition	AVCD-93110/B
Japan	March 18, 2015	Avex Trax	CD+MV DVD Limited Edition	AVCD-93111/B
Japan	March 18, 2015	Avex Trax	CD only Edition	AVCD-93112
Japan	March 18, 2015	Avex Trax	Mu-mo Edition	AVC1-93113/B
