= Kim Jung-ah =

South Korean singer (born 1983)

Jung Ah
- 김정아
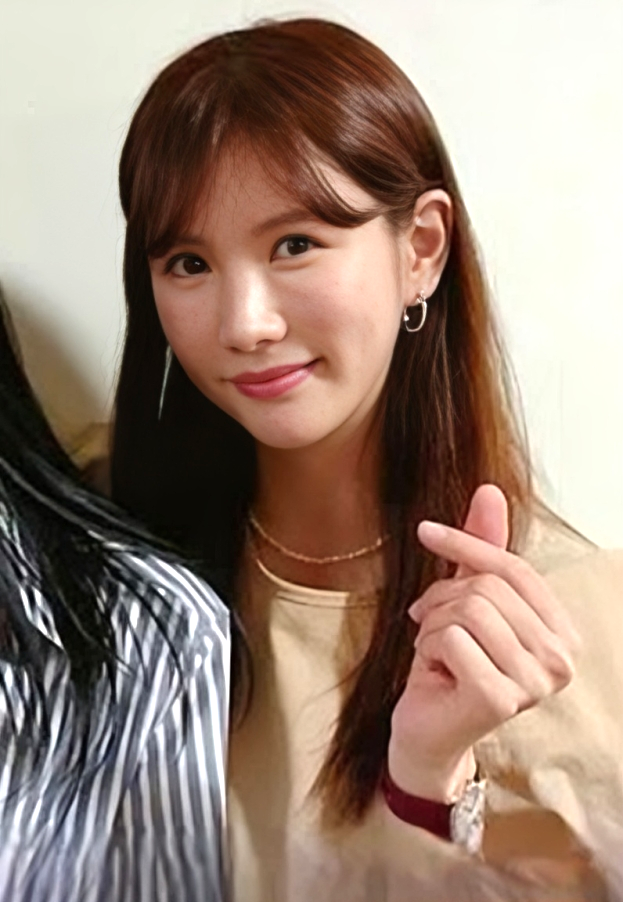
- Kim in June 2021
- Born: Kim Jung-ah; August 2, 1983 (age 43); Incheon, South Korea
- Education: Kyungmin College
- Occupation: Singer
- Spouse: Jung Chang-young (m. 2018)
- Children: 2
- Musical career
- Genres: K-pop; Ballad
- Instrument: Vocals
- Years active: 2009–present
- Labels: Pledis; B.A.M Company
- Formerly of: Kiss Five; After School; A.S. Red

Korean name
- Hangul: 김정아
- Hanja: 金廷娥
- RR: Gim Jeonga
- MR: Kim Chŏnga

Kim Jung-ah (Korean: 김정아; born August 2, 1983), known professionally as Jung Ah or Jung A, is a South Korean singer. She was a member of Kiss Five and the former leader of After School. In 2016, Pledis Entertainment announced that her contract had expired and she had graduated from After School naturally.

== Career ==
=== After School and solo activities ===
Kim joined with After School's unofficial first appearance on December 29, 2008, at the SBS Song Festival, performing "Play Girlz" with Son Dam-bi and Kahi. In the beginning on 2009, After School released debut single album New Schoolgirl, with the lead single "AH!" on January 15. After School made their debut stage on MBC's January 17 episode of Music Core.

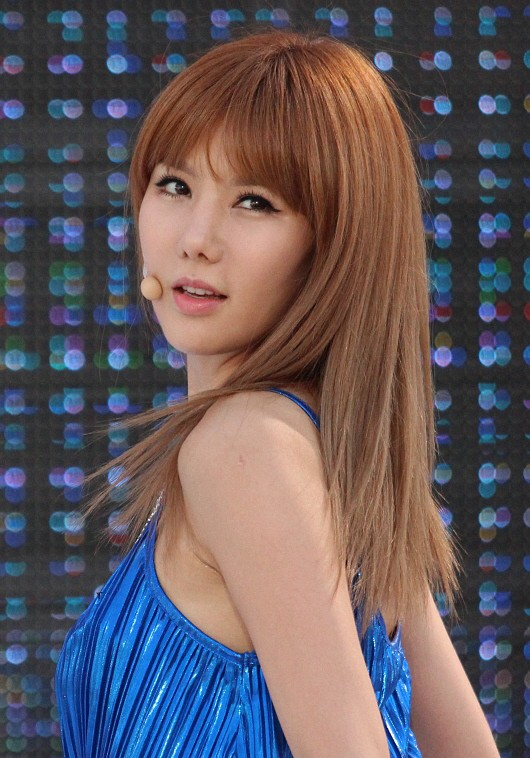
Kim at the Super M concert in 2012

Kim became the new leader of the group after Kahi's graduation. In September 2012, it was announced that Kim had been cast into MBC Every1's drama Reckless Family 2.

On April 7, 2015, Pledis Entertainment announced that Kim and labelmate Han Dong-geun would be releasing a duet entitled "Between the Two of Us" on April 16.

On January 28, 2016, Kim's contract with Pledis Entertainment expired and she graduated from After School after seven years of activity.

On May 25, 2016, Kim announced she'd debut as a solo artist with a new album in June, featuring rapper J-STAR.

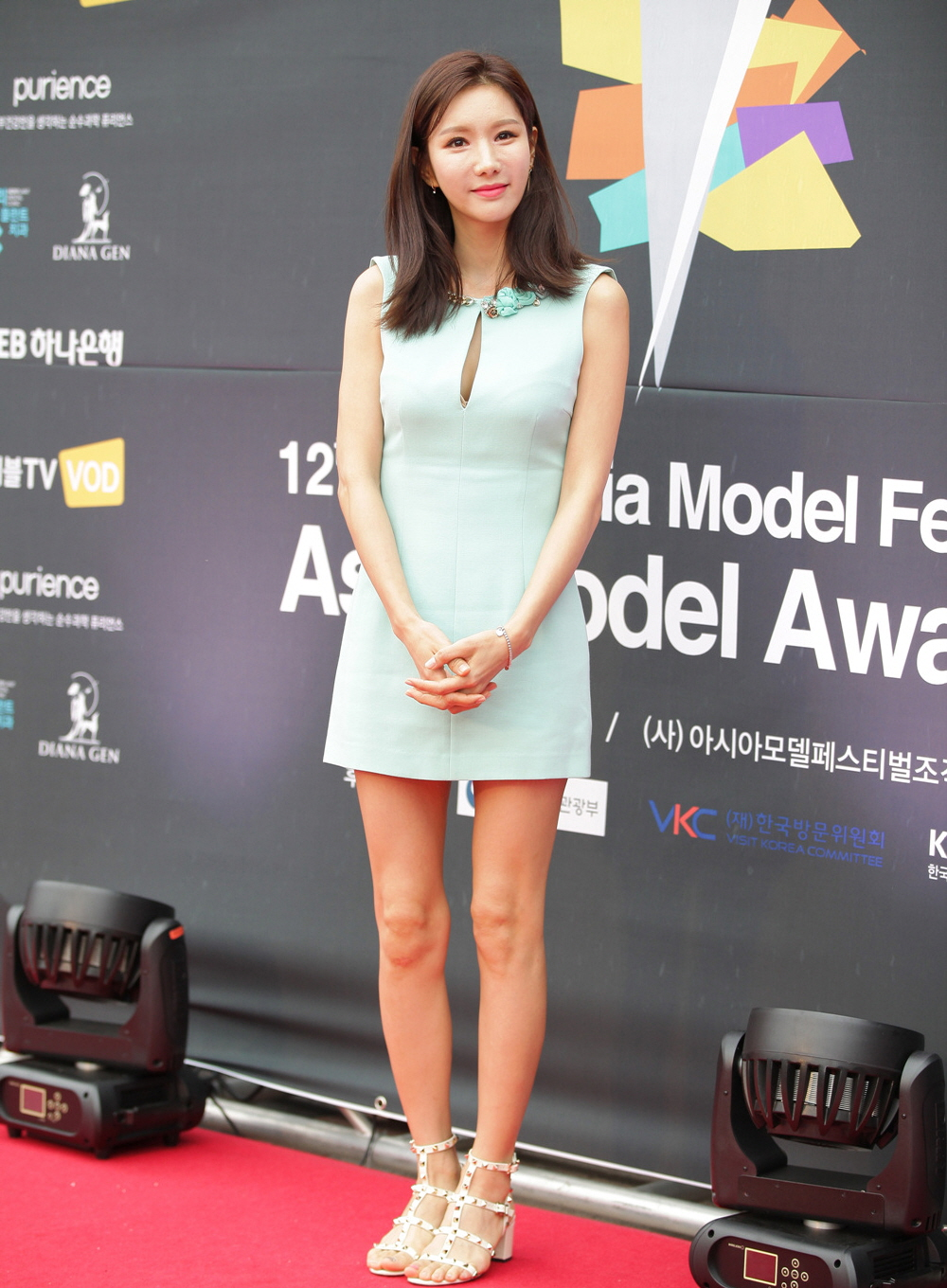
Kim at the Asia Model Festival in 2017

== Personal life ==
On March 25, 2013, reports surfaced stating that Kim and Shinee's Onew had been dating for over a year after images were released showing them together. In the past, Onew had stated that Kim was his "ideal girl". Representatives for both Kim and Onew denied the dating allegations and stated that they are just "close friends". However, netizens were not convinced after unveiling Twitter conversations between Kim and Onew where they had mentioned "buying dinner" and Kim had mentioned that she had "fallen in love". The tweets were deleted following the reports.

In mid 2015, reports arose stating that Kim and basketball player Jung Chang-young were dating. Her agency initially denied the reports, however they later confirmed that they were in fact dating. On August 24, 2017, a source from her agency stated, "Jung-ah and Jung Chang-young will be holding a wedding ceremony next year. Jung Chang-young's warm heart influenced her decision to marry him." Jung is five years younger than Kim, and they have reportedly been dating for about a year. The pair married on April 28, 2018. On October 23, 2019, she announced on social media that their first son was born. In October 2021, Kim gave birth to a second daughter.

== Discography ==
=== Singles ===
Title	Year	Peak chart positions	Sales	Album
Title	Year	KOR	Sales	Album
"Between the Two of Us" (with Han Dong Geun)	2015	—	KOR (DL):	Non-album single
"Spring Summer (S.S)" (with J-STAR)	2016	—	KOR (DL):	Non-album single
"—" denotes releases that did not chart or were not released in that region.

=== Soundtrack appearances ===
Year	Title	Peak positions	Sales	Album
Year	Title	KOR	Sales	Album
2010	"You're Cute"	16		Pasta OST
2013	"Hero" (Performed by Uee & Jungah)	—		Barefoot Friends OST
"—" denotes releases that did not chart or were not released in that region.

=== Other songs ===
Year	Title	Album
2011	"My Bell"	Virgin
2012	"Timeless" (Performed by Jungah & Raina)	Flashback
2013	"Crying While Putting Make-up On" (Performed by Jungah & Raina)	First Love

== Filmography ==
=== TV drama ===
Year	Title	Role
2012	Reckless Family 2	Herself

=== Music video appearance ===
Year	Song	Artist
2011	"Bangkok City"	Orange Caramel

=== Variety show ===
Year	Title	Notes
2009	1000 Song Challenge	with Kahi, Uee
2010	1000 Song Challenge	with Nana
2010	Quiz to Change the World	with Kahi
2010	Radio Star	with Son Dam-bi, Kahi, Nana
2011	1000 Song Challenge	with E-Young, Nana, Raina
2011	Quiz to Change the World	with Lizzy
2012	Strong Heart	with Lizzy
2012	Hello Counselor	with Lizzy
2013–2014	After School's Beauty Bible	with After School
