= Who Are You? (EP) =

2013 EP by Kahi

EP by Kahi
- Released: October 10, 2013
- Recorded: 2012–2013
- Genre: K-pop; R&B; hip hop
- Language: Korean
- Label: Pledis; LOEN

Kahi chronology
'Come Back, You Bad Person' (2011)	Who Are You? (2013)

Singles from Who Are You?
- 1. "It's ME" Released: October 10, 2013

Who Are You? is the second extended play by South Korean singer Kahi. It was released on October 10, 2013.

== Background ==
In late September, it was speculated that Kahi will be making her long-awaited comeback in mid October. On September 27, Pledis Entertainment confirmed the reports and announced that Kahi will be releasing her second mini album, titled "Who Are You?", on October 10. Over the next few days, teasers were released promoting the comeback. The track list was later revealed and featured artists such as Dumbfoundead, Dok2 and ex-After School member, Bekah.

== Track listing ==
No.	Title	Lyrics	Music	Length
1.	"Boys & Girls" (featuring Swings)	Neonethy	Neonethy	3:19
2.	"It's ME" (featuring Dumbfoundead)	Alice Sky	Alice Sky	3:40
3.	"Hey Boy" (featuring Dok2)	Kahi	Mister Rocks, Anthony Mills	3:13
4.	"Sinister" (featuring Bekah)	Kahi	Jessica Cornish, Curtis Richardson, Paulo Mendaco	3:24
5.	"Colorful World (색색의 세계)" (featuring Yoon Do-hyun of YB)	Yoon Do-hyun	Yoon Do-hyun, Scott Hellowell	3:28
6.	"Slow"	Kahi	Lee Chang-hyun	4:05

== Release and promotion ==
Following the release of the album, Kahi made her "comeback stage" on Mnet's M! Countdown where she performed the lead single, "It's ME". To promote the album, Kahi will perform on Korean music shows M! Countdown, Music Core, Inkigayo and Show Champion on a weekly basis. Kahi will not be promoting on Music Bank due to conflicts between the broadcast company, KBS, and Pledis Entertainment.

== Chart performance ==
Upon release, the song ranked high on music charts and maintained a strong position within the top 20 for several days.

=== Single chart ===
Chart	Peak position
Gaon Weekly singles chart	45
Gaon Weekly streaming chart	99
Gaon Weekly download chart	38
Gaon Weekly BGM chart	55
Billboard Korea K-Pop Hot 100	51

=== Album chart ===
Chart	Peak position
Gaon Weekly album chart	13
Gaon Weekly domestic album chart	11
Gaon Monthly album chart	31
Gaon Yearly album chart	

=== Sales and certifications ===
Chart	Amount
Gaon physical sales	2,824

== Release history ==
Country	Date	Format	Label
South Korea	October 10, 2013	CD, Digital download	Pledis Entertainment LOEN Entertainment
