= Happy Pledis 2nd Album =

Happy Pledis 2012

Single album by After School, Son Dam-bi, Kahi, NU'EST and Hello Venus
- Released: December 1, 2011
- Recorded: 2011
- Genre: Pop, Christmas
- Label: Pledis Entertainment

After School chronology
Red / Blue (2011)	Happy Pledis 2012 (2011)	Playgirlz (2012)

Singles from Happy Pledis 2nd Album
- 1. "Love Letter" Released: December 1, 2011

Happy Pledis 2nd Album is a charity single by the South Korean music label Pledis Entertainment's artists Son Dam-bi, Kahi, After School, NU'EST's JR and Baekho, Hello Venus's Yoo Ara and Lime and Pre-School Girl Park Jung-hyun. The album was released under the name Happy Pledis 2nd Album and is a charity release. As NU'EST and Hello Venus hadn't officially debuted then, the album doesn't include all the members of the two groups, and NU'EST went by the name "Pledis Boys". The album consisted of tracks "Love Letter", "Winter’s Tale", and "How Are You".

== History ==
The Happy Pledis album is a project album purported to give back the love and support the artists have received from their fans; it also asks people to look around themselves with a warmer heart in the winter season. Happy Pledis 2011 was released in December. A portion of the Happy Pledis 2011 earnings was donated to UNICEF to help look after those in need, and the album is also a gift to the fans who have shown the artists so much love and interest. The album included Son Dam-bi, After School, Baekho, Minhyun, Yoo Ara and Lime of Hello Venus, and Park Jung-hyun.

== Track listing ==
No.	Title	Length
1.	"Love Letter" (Son Dam-bi & After School featuring Ara, Kim Hyelim (Lime) from Hello Venus, Minhyun, Baekho from NU'EST, Park Jung-hyun)	3:25
2.	"Winter Story" (Son Dam-bi, Kahi & Jungah)	2:55
3.	"How Are You?" (Orange Caramel)	3:41
4.	"Love Love Love (Remix)" (After School)	4:28
Total length:		13:49

== Music videos ==
- 2011: Love Letter
- 2011: Love Letter [Pledis Boys Version]
