= Marco (actor) =

South Korean model and actor

- Born: Marcos Benjamín Lee; 12 July 1977 (age 49); Argentina
- Occupations: Model; actor
- Agent: 6Entertainment
- Height: 1.82 m (5 ft 11 1/2 in)
- Spouse: Ahn Shi-hyun (m. 2011; div. 2013)

Marcos Benjamín Lee (Korean: 마르코; born 12 July 1977), better known as Marco, is a South Korean model and actor, born and raised in Argentina.

== Biography ==
After only making minor cameo appearances in dramas, Marco is best known for appearing on popular reality show We Got Married alongside Son Dam Bi.

He later appeared in After School's music video "AH."

Marco appeared as a cast member of MBC Every1's 2010 family reality show Family Needed: Season 4 along with Park Jun-gyu, Kang Soo-ji, Actress Kim Jung-min and girl group Secret's Han Sunhwa, and was a regular cast member of the MBC's Sunday Sunday Night show Danbi. In 2011, Lee married Korean golfer, Ahn Shi-hyun and they were divorced in 2013.

== Filmography ==
- It's Okay, Daddy's Girl (SBS, 2010)
- Dream (SBS, 2009)
- Don't Cry My Love (MBC, 2009)
- Kokkiri (MBC, 2008)
- Air City (MBC, 2007)
- Only You (SBS, 2005)
