= Diva (After School song) =

2009 single by After School

Single by After School
- B-side: "Ready to Love (JP ver.)"
- Released: April 9, 2009 (KR); November 23, 2011 (JP)
- Genre: Electropop; dance
- Length: 3:18
- Label: Pledis; Avex Trax
- Songwriter: Kang Dong-chul
- Producer: Brave Brothers

After School Korean singles chronology
"Ah" (2009)	"Diva" (2009)	"Because of You" (2009)

After School Japanese singles chronology
"Bang!" (2011)	"Diva" (2011)	"Rambling Girls/Because of You" (2011)

Japanese single cover

"Diva" (Korean: 디바) is a song recorded by South Korean girl group After School. The song was released on April 9, 2009, as a digital single and later added on the group's second single album "Because of You" as a B-side. The song is the first release including Uee and the last release including Soyoung, who withdrew from the group to become an actress.

A Japanese version of the song was released on November 23, 2011, serving as the group's second Japanese single. An original Japanese song "Ready to Love" was released with the single.

== Track listing ==
Korean single
No.	Title	Length
1.	"Diva"	3:18
2.	"Diva" (Instrumental)	3:18
Total length:		6:36

Japanese single
No.	Title	Length
1.	"Diva" (Japanese version)	3:19
2.	"Ready to Love"	3:01
Total length:		6:20

CD only edition
No.	Title	Length
3.	"Diva" (2011 New Korean version)	3:20
4.	"Diva" (Instrumental)	3:20
5.	"Ready to Love" (Instrumental)	3:02
Total length:		16:05

DVD (Type A)
No.	Title	Length
1.	"Tap Slap" (Music video)
2.	"Diva" (Music video – Japanese version)
3.	"Single Jacket shoot" (Making of – Type A version)

DVD (Type B)
No.	Title	Length
1.	"Diva" (Live at Akasaka BLITZ 2011.7.17 from AFTER SCHOOL JAPAN PREMIUM PARTY -Bang!Bang!Bang!-)
2.	"Diva & Tap Slap" (Making of – Type B version)

== Trivia ==
"Tap Slap" is a Japanese instrumental version of the song "Let's Step Up", included on the group's first album Virgin. The Korean version of "Diva" included on the Japanese single is a new version. It used the Japanese instrumental for the version and included the members Nana, Lizzy, Raina and E-Young.

== Chart performance ==
=== Korean version ===
Chart	Peak position
Gaon Monthly Singles Chart (May 2009)	9

=== Japanese version ===
Released	Oricon chart	Peak	Debut sales	Sales total
November 23, 2011	Daily Singles Chart	11	17,448	25,000
November 23, 2011	Weekly Singles Chart	12	17,448	25,000
November 23, 2011	Monthly Singles Chart	38	17,448	25,000

== Release history ==
Country	Date	Format	Label
South Korea	April 9, 2009	Digital download	Pledis Entertainment
Japan	November 16, 2011	Digital download (Song only)	Avex Trax
Japan	November 23, 2011	CD single, Digital download (Full single)	Avex Trax
