= Playgirlz =

Studio album by After School
- Released: March 14, 2012
- Recorded: 2011–2012
- Genres: J-pop, Dance-pop, Electropop
- Language: Japanese
- Label: Avex Trax

After School chronology
Happy Pledis 2nd Album (2011)	Playgirlz (2012)	Flashback (2012)

Singles from Playgirlz
- 1. "Bang!" Released: August 17, 2011; 2. "Diva" Released: November 23, 2011; 3. "Rambling Girls/Because of You" Released: January 25, 2012

Playgirlz is the debut Japanese studio album of South Korean girl group After School, released on March 14, 2012 in Japan under Avex Trax. The album was released in three versions, a CD & DVD Limited Press Edition, a CD & DVD Edition and a regular CD Edition. It was preceded by the singles "Bang!", "Diva" and double A-side "Rambling Girls/Because of You".

== Editions ==
The album was released in three different editions: CD & DVD Limited Press Edition, CD & DVD Edition, and the Regular CD Edition.

The CD & DVD Limited Press Edition contains the CD album, and a DVD containing the "Japan Premium Party -Bang! Bang! Bang!- Live at AKASAKA BLITZ" show, along with Playcards and 1 trading card randomly selected out of 9 different styles.

The CD & DVD Edition contains the CD album and a DVD containing the 5 Original Japanese Version music videos, and three Japanese Dance Edit Version music videos of Bang!, Diva and Rambling Girls. It all comes in a cardboard slipcase, once again including 1 trading card out of 9 different styles along with other trading cards. The DVD also includes Bonus Content including the original Shanghai Romance Korean music video, and miscellaneous After School special footage.

The CD Regular Edition of Playgirlz contains only the CD album itself, along with a Japanese Version of Orange Caramel's "Shanghai Romance" as a bonus track.

== Track listing ==
CD
No.	Title	Lyrics	Music	Length
1.	"Rip off"	H.U.B.	Joleen Belle, William "Bleu" McAuley, Windy Wagner	2:58
2.	"Rambling girls"	Harumi	Ano Bhagavan, Peter Wennerberg, Mathias Venge, Gary Jangfeldt	3:29
3.	"Broken Heart" (featuring Jung-A, Raina, Nana and E-Young)	Kaji Katsura	Michelle Lewis, Khris Lorenz	3:21
4.	"Diva" (Japanese Version)	Mizue	Brave Brothers	3:21
5.	"Just In Time"	Hanai	Yusuke Itagaki	3:30
6.	"Shampoo" (Japanese Version)	Maika Sato, Kaoru	Daishi Dance	4:38
7.	"Because of You" (Japanese Version)	Mutsumi, Kana Yabuki	Brave Brothers	4:09
8.	"Gimme Love"	Harumi	Fraktal, Masamichi Kono	3:42
9.	"Miss Futuristic" (featuring Kahi, Juyeon, U-ie and Lizzy)	Shoko Fujibayashi	Nao Tanaka	3:11
10.	"Bang!" (Japanese Version)	H.U.B., Bekah	Kim Tae Hyun	3:22
11.	"Tell Me"	Kanata Okajima	Yusuke Itagaki	4:09
Total length:				39:46

DVD (Version A): Japan Premium Party -Bang! Bang! Bang!- Live at AKASAKA BLITZ
No.	Title	Length
1.	"OPENING"	2:27
2.	"Shampoo" (Korean Version)	4:22
3.	"Because of You" (Korean Version)	4:00
4.	"Lady"	3:34
5.	"Talk Corner"	21:59
6.	"AH"	3:07
7.	"Diva" (Korean Version)	3:18
8.	"Someone is you"	4:07
9.	"Let's Do It!" (Japanese Version)	1:28
10.	"Bang!" (Japanese Version)	3:23

DVD (Version B)
No.	Title	Length
1.	"Let's Do It" (Japanese Original Version)	1:33
2.	"Bang" (Japanese Original Version)	3:30
3.	"Tap Slap" (Japanese Original Version)	1:50
4.	"Diva" (Japanese Original Version)	3:32
5.	"Rambling Girls" (Japanese Original Version)	3:41
6.	"Bang" (Japanese Dance Edit Version)	3:24
7.	"Diva" (Japanese Dance Edit Version)	3:22
8.	"Rambling Girls" (Japanese Dance Edit Version)	3:32
9.	"Shanghai Romance" (Korean Version)	3:50
10.	"Special footage of AFTERSCHOOL"	2:06

Bonus tracks (Version C) (Note: also available on some streaming service.)
No.	Title	Length
12.	"Shanghai Romance" (Japanese Version)	3:47

== Charts ==
=== Weekly charts ===
Chart (2012)	Peak position
Japanese Albums (Oricon)	8
Japanese Top Albums (Billboard)	8

=== Monthly charts ===
Chart (2012)	Peak position
Japanese Albums (Oricon)	28

== Sales ==
Region	Certification	Certified units/sales
Japan	—	28,489

== Release history ==
Country	Date	Format	Label
Japan	March 14, 2012	CD+DVD Limited Edition, CD+DVD, CD only	Avex Trax
Hong Kong	May 8, 2012	CD+DVD, CD only	Avex Trax
Taiwan	May 8, 2012	CD+DVD, CD only	Avex Trax
