= Heaven (After School song) =

- CD only edition cover

Single by After School

from the album Dress to Kill
- B-side: Crazy Driver; First Love
- Released: September 25, 2013 (Digital only)
- Recorded: 2013
- Genre: Dance
- Label: Avex Trax
- Songwriter(s): H Garza, J Garza, R Garza
- Producer(s): Shinichi Osawa

After School Japanese singles chronology
"Lady Luck/Dilly Dally" (2012)	"Heaven" (2013)	"Shh" (2014)

"Heaven" is the fifth Japanese single from South Korean girl group After School. The single was released physically on October 2, 2013, but was released digitally on September 25, 2013. The track is produced by Shinichi Osawa. This is the first Japanese release with new member Kaeun, and the first Japanese release without former leader Park Kahi.

== Background ==
After releasing the group's fourth single in June 2012, the group focused on preparing for their Korean comeback in June 2013 with "First Love," which later becomes the second b-side for "Heaven." In August, the group announced it would return to Japan with its fifth single, "Heaven," to be released in October. The single is to be released in three versions: CD only edition (Type C), CD & DVD edition (Type A) and CD & Photobook (Type B) edition. The photobook edition includes photos of After School by the Harajuku-based photographer Yonehara Yasumasa, who also produced the album arts.

== Music video ==
The music video for "Heaven", directed by Tanabe Hidenobu, was released on August 24, 2013. The music video opens with members' pole dancing, a skill they learned for their Korean promotions of First Love. The video then transitions into first person perspective of a man who gets up from the floor as if becoming sober. The video transitions into clips of After School, suggesting the man is reminding himself of preceding events. After the dance break, the video returns to the perspective of the man, who is shown to dine and drink. After it shows the choreography once again, the video proceeds into rapid scene changes, which ends with the man falling on the floor in the room, whose lights are turned out.

== Track listing ==
CD+DVD and CD+Photobook edition:
No.	Title	Lyrics	Music	Length
1.	"Heaven"	Mutsumi	Shinichi Osawa	4:41
2.	"Crazy Driver"	Mutsumi	Lubo Slavicek	3:27

CD only edition
No.	Title	Lyrics	Music	Length
3.	"First Love"	Brave Brothers	Brave Brothers	3:41
4.	"Heaven" (Instrumental)		Shinichi Osawa	4:41
5.	"Crazy Driver" (Instrumental)		Lubo Slavicek	3:27

DVD (Type A)
No.	Title	Length
1.	"Heaven" (Music video)
2.	"First Love" (Music video)
3.	"Heaven" (Making of)

== Chart performance ==
=== Oricon chart ===
Released	Oricon Chart	Peak	Debut sales	Sales total
October 2, 2013	Daily Singles Chart	6	18,596 (weekly)	19,884+
October 2, 2013	Weekly Singles Chart	7	18,596 (weekly)	19,884+
October 2, 2013	Monthly Singles Chart	32	18,596 (weekly)	19,884+
October 2, 2013	Yearly Singles Chart	364	18,596 (weekly)	19,884+

=== Billboard charts ===
Chart	Peak position
Billboard Japan Hot 100	28
Billboard Japan Hot Singles Sales	13
Billboard Japan Hot Top Airplay	40
Billboard Japan Adult Contemporary Airplay	43

== Release history ==
Country	Date	Format	Label
Japan	September 25, 2013	Digital download	Avex Trax
Japan	October 2, 2013	CD single	Avex Trax
