= Happy Pledis 1st Album =

Single album by After School
- Released: December 7, 2010
- Recorded: 2010
- Genre: Pop; Christmas
- Label: Pledis Entertainment

After School chronology
Bang! (2010)	Happy Pledis 1st Album (2010)	Virgin (2011)

Singles from Happy Pledis 1st Album
- 1. "Love Love Love" Released: December 7, 2010

Happy Pledis 1st Album is a charity single album by the South Korean girl group After School. The album was released under the name "Happy Pledis" and is a charity release. The album didn't include rapper Bekah, as she was on holiday during promotions. Songs "Love Love Love" and "Someone is You" were both promotional singles from the album. The title track, "Love Love Love", was written by After School's main vocalist, Raina.

== History ==
The “Happy PLEDIS” album is a project album purported to give back the love and support the artists have received from their fans; it also asks people to look around themselves with a warmer heart in the winter season. Pledis Entertainment's artists Son Dambi, After School, and their sub-unit group Orange Caramel each released their own version of the Happy Pledis album. "Fans will be able to see a lovelier side of After School through this album, along with a sweet melody that will make this winter season that much more beautiful." Pledis also spoke about Bekah's absence from the album; "Bekah was unable to participate in this album because she is on break at her home in Hawaii. She’s been working for the past 3-4 years and was unable to go home, which is why we let her go this time. She will be in Hawaii for the next one or two months."

A portion of the profits from the “Happy PLEDIS” albums was donated to the “Save the Children” organization. The girls first performed "Someone Is You", before performing "Love Love Love" later.

== Track listing ==
No.	Title	Lyrics	Music	Length
1.	"Love Love Love"	Raina(레이나)	Anders Dannvik & Kristian Lagerström	3:58
2.	"Someone Is You"	Kahi (가희)	Dainel Barkman & Jorgen Ringqvist	3:09
3.	"Love Love Love (Instrumental)"		Anders Dannvik & Kristian Lagerström	3:01
4.	"Someone Is You (Instrumental)"		Dainel Barkman & Jorgen Ringqvist	3:58
Total length:				13:58

== Chart performance ==
=== Album chart ===
Chart	Peak position
South Korean Weekly Albums (Gaon)	2
South Korean Monthly Albums (Gaon)	10

=== Single chart ===
"Love Love Love"
Chart	Peak position
South Korea (Gaon)	8
