= Yoo So-young =

South Korean singer and actress (born 1986)

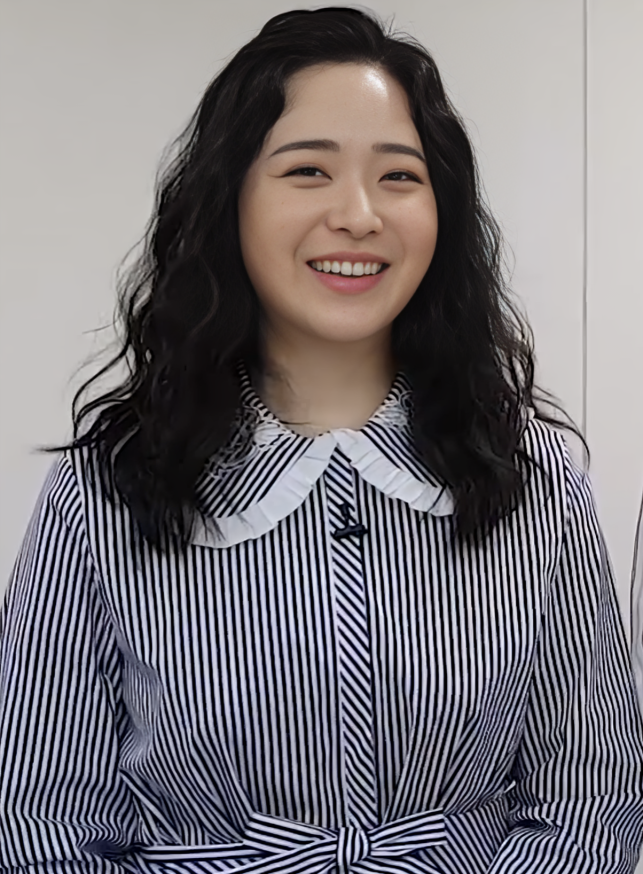
- Yoo in March 2018
- Born: Joo So-young; March 29, 1986 (age 40); Sindang-dong, Jung-gu, Seoul, South Korea
- Education: Chung-Ang University
- Occupations: Actress; singer
- Years active: 2009–present
- Agents: Iron; Star Story
- Musical career
- Genre: K-pop
- Instrument: Vocals
- Label: Pledis
- Formerly of: After School

Korean name
- Hangul: 주소영
- RR: Ju Soyeong
- MR: Chu Soyŏng

Stage name
- Hangul: 유소영
- RR: Yu Soyeong
- MR: Yu Soyŏng

Yoo So-young (Korean: 유소영; born March 29, 1986) is a South Korean actress, She debuted as a singer as a member of the girl group After School, before she graduated in late 2009. She is known for her supporting roles in Korean dramas, including Dream High 2 and High Society.

== Career ==
Yoo So-young debuted with After School's unofficial first appearance on December 29, 2008, at the SBS Song Festival, performing "Play Girlz" with Son Dam-bi. Prior to that, she made an appearance on KBS "TV Kindergarten One Two Three" as Hana; she also took part in 75th "Miss Chunhyang pageant", winning second place, in 2005. After School officially debuted in January 2009. She graduated from the group on October 29, 2009, to pursue a career in acting.

== Filmography ==
Year	Title	Role	Ref.
2011	My Bittersweet Life	Lee Se-ra	
2012	Dream High 2	Park Soon-dong	
2012	Miss Panda and Mr. Hedgehog	Kang Eun-bi	
2013	Came To Me and Became A Star	Jeong-ah	
2014	You're Only Mine	Kang Sung-ah	
2015	High Society	Jang So-hyun	
2017	Beastie Girls	Ji-yeon	

=== Television show ===
Year	Title	Notes	Ref.
2020	King of Mask Singer	Contestant as "Gosa" (episode 283)	
