= Rambling Girls/Because of You =

Single by After School

from the album Playgirlz
- A-side: Rambling Girls; Because of You
- Released: January 25, 2012
- Recorded: 2011
- Genre: Dance
- Length: 7:37
- Label: Avex Trax

After School Japanese singles chronology
"Diva" (2011)	"Rambling Girls/Because of You" (2012)	"Lady Luck / Dilly Dally" (2012)

"Rambling Girls/Because of You" is the third Japanese single from the South Korean girl group After School. It is a double A-side single consisting of two songs, an original song titled "Rambling Girls" and a Japanese re-recording of their 2009 hit "Because of You". The single was released on January 25, 2012. The single debuted at #6 on the Oricon Daily Chart and #7 on the Oricon Weekly Chart.

== Track listing ==
Japanese single:
No.	Title	Length
1.	"Rambling Girls"	3:30
2.	"Because of You" (Japanese version)	4:07
Total length:		7:37

CD only edition
No.	Title	Length
3.	"Because of You" (Korean version)	4:00
4.	"Rambling Girls" (Instrumental)	3:30
5.	"Because of You (Japanese version)" (Instrumental)	4:07
Total length:		19:14

DVD (Type A)
No.	Title	Length
1.	"Rambling Girls" (Music video)
2.	"SHIBUYA 109 PHOTO SHOOT" (Making of)

DVD (Type B)
No.	Title	Length
1.	"Because of You (Korean version)" (Music video)
2.	"Rambling Girls" (Making of)

== Chart performance ==
=== Oricon Chart ===
Released	Oricon chart	Peak	Debut sales	Sales total
January 25, 2012	Daily Singles Chart	6	12,110	17,029+
January 25, 2012	Weekly Singles Chart	7	12,110	17,029+
January 25, 2012	Monthly Singles Chart	42	12,110	17,029+

== Release history ==
Country	Date	Format	Label
Japan	January 25, 2012	CD single, digital download (Full single)	Avex Trax
