= Bang! (After School song) =

2010 single by After School

- South Korean physical cover

Single by After School

from the album Playgirlz
- Released: March 25, 2010; August 17, 2011 (Japan)
- Genre: Dance-pop
- Length: 11:58
- Label: Pledis; Avex Trax
- Songwriters: Kim Hee-sun; Bekah; Kim Tae-hyun
- Producers: Kim Tae-hyun, More Than Present

After School singles chronology
"Because of You" (2009)	"Bang!" (2010)	"Love Love Love" (2010)

Japanese singles chronology
"Bang!" (2010)	"Diva" (2011)

Japanese single cover

"Bang!" is a song recorded by the South Korean girl group After School. This song marked the first appearance of the group's eighth member, Lizzy. It was later released in Japanese for the group's Japan debut. The song was released on August 17, 2011, in 3 editions. The Japanese version does not include former member Bekah, who left the group to become a designer after the promotions for the group's first Korean album, 'Virgin,' were completed.

== Background and release ==
"Bang!" is After School's third Korean single. The title track, which was used as the lead single, was originally planned to be included in After School's second single "Because of You," but was delayed due to the lyricist and composer wanting to make the track more complete. The single's concept displayed the group wearing sexy marching band outfits, and it was later revealed that Kahi created the concept. Kahi stated that after watching the American film Drumline, she fell in love with the marching band style and wanted to do a marching band concept since becoming an After School member. The group practiced playing the drums for five months with a trainer for the concept. The Korean version of "Bang!" used in the CD only edition of the Japanese single is the "2011 New Recordings" version from the group's first album Virgin.

== Commercial performance ==
The single was released early in South Korea after Pledis Entertainment announced that preorder sales for the single had reached over 30,000 on online and offline retailers. Following the release of the single, "Bang!" remained in the top 5 on various online music charts and continued to steadily rise. The single debuted at #4 on the Gaon Singles Chart before peaking at #2 the following week. The physical single debuted and peaked at #2 on the Gaon Album Chart, behind Girls' Generation. The Japanese version debuted at #6 on Oricon's Daily Singles Chart and #7 on the weekly chart selling 23,760 copies. To date, the single has sold over 42,363 copies in Japan.

The title track reached #17 on the Gaon 2010 digital download charts with 2,374,731 copies sold. More than one year later, the single was released as their official Japanese debut. The single was released in three versions, two CD+DVD editions and one CD only edition. Both CD+DVD editions include the same track list, however the A edition features contents in Japanese, while they are in Korean for the B edition. The CD only edition also includes the original Korean version of the song, plus two instrumental tracks.

== Korean choreography controversy ==
After School was accused of choreographic plagiarism after German dancer and choreographer Camillo Lauricella received messages saying that the group "stole some of our moves for their music video of their song "Bang!"." Pledis Entertainment responded to the allegations stating, "There is a problem in deeming choreography as plagiarized just because a single dance move less than 3 seconds long is somewhat similar to another. The choreography for "Bang!" is strictly the end product of our creation, put together by Pledis' Korean and American choreographers." They went on to further say, "Dance is a language spoken through the body for everyone, regardless of cultural barriers. To give a comparison, one would not say that a certain modern choreography is plagiarized because it is similar to a Korean culture dance. We hope no more disputes and controversies are generated over this matter."

Lauricella later claimed that more than three seconds of his dance move was stolen, unlike what Pledis Entertainment had stated.

== Track listing ==
Korean single
No.	Title	Lyrics	Music	Length
1.	"Let's Do It"		Kim Tae Hyun, More Than Present	1:21
2.	"Bang!" ("뱅!")	Kim Hee Sun, Bekah	Kim Tae Hyun, More Than Present	3:18
3.	"With U"	Kahi	Seo Jae Ha	3:51
4.	"Bang!" (Instrumental)		Kim Tae Hyun, More Than Present	3:18
Total length:				11:48

Japanese single
No.	Title	Length
1.	"Bang!" (Japanese version)	3:20
2.	"Super sexy"	3:35
Total length:		6:55

CD only edition
No.	Title	Length
3.	"Bang!" (Korean version)	3:21
4.	"Bang!" (Instrumental)	3:20
5.	"Super Sexy" (Instrumental)	3:32
Total length:		17:08

DVD (type A & B)
No.	Title	Length
1.	"Let's Do It!" (Music video – Japanese version)
2.	"Bang!" (Music video – Japanese version)
3.	"Jiko Shoukai & Making Movie" (自己紹介)

== Charts ==
=== Korean version ===
==== Weekly charts ====
Chart (2010)	Peak position
South Korea (Gaon Album Chart)	2
South Korea (Gaon Digital Chart)	2

==== Monthly charts ====
Chart (2010)	Position
South Korea (Gaon Album Chart)	9
South Korea (Gaon Digital Chart)	7

==== Year-end charts ====
Chart (2010)	Position
South Korea (Gaon Album Chart)	93
South Korea (Gaon Digital Chart)	29

=== Japanese version ===
==== Weekly charts ====
Chart (2011)	Peak position
Japan (Japan Hot 100)	10
Japan (Oricon Singles Chart)	7

==== Monthly charts ====
Chart (2011)	Position
Japan (Oricon Singles Chart)	21
