= Lady Luck/Dilly Dally =

Single by After School

from the album BEST
- A-side: Lady Luck; Dilly Dally
- B-side: "Slow Love"
- Released: June 13, 2012
- Recorded: 2012
- Genre: Dance, pop
- Length: 7:05
- Label: Avex Trax
- Songwriters: Lady Luck: Reika Yuki, Pessi Levanto, Kyösti Salokorpi, Jun Suyama; Dilly Dally: Reika Yuki, Henrik Nordenback, Christian Fast

After School Japanese singles chronology
"Rambling Girls / Because of You" (2012)	"Lady Luck/Dilly Dally" (2012)	"Heaven" (2013)

"'Lady Luck/Dilly Dally" is the fourth Japanese single from South Korean girl group After School. It is a double A-side single consisting of two a-sides and one b-side, the b-side being exclusive to the CD only edition. The single was scheduled to be released on June 13, 2012. "Dilly Dally" was sampled on the Rexena deodorant commercial and "Lady Luck" was used in Samantha Thavasa's "summer collection" commercial. The b-side, "Slow Love", was also used on a commercial for Eyefull Home. The single is to be released in three versions: CD only edition, CD & DVD (Type A) edition and CD & DVD (Type B) edition.

This is the last release with former leader Park Kahi. In 2015, the single itself and all of the bsides were included in their 1st Japanese greatest hits album called "BEST".

== Track listing ==
Single:
No.	Title	Lyrics	Music	Arrangement	Length
1.	"Lady Luck"	Reika Yuki	Pessi Levanto, Kyösti Salokorpi	Jun Suyama	3:31
2.	"Dilly Dally"	Reika Yuki	Henrik Nordenback, Christian Fast	Henrik Nordenback	3:34
Total length:					7:05

CD only edition
No.	Title	Length
3.	"Slow Love"	4:22
4.	"Lady Luck" (Instrumental)	3:31
5.	"Dilly Dally" (Instrumental)	3:34
6.	"Slow Love" (Instrumental)	4:22

DVD (Type A)
No.	Title	Length
1.	"Lady Luck" (Music video)
2.	"Lady Luck" (Making of)

DVD (Type B)
No.	Title	Length
1.	"PLAYGIRLZ TOUR" (Document movie)
2.	"Dilly Dally" (Live at Namba Hatch)
3.	"Lady Luck" (Live at Namba Hatch)

== Chart performance ==
=== Oricon chart ===
Released	Oricon Chart	Peak	Debut Sales	Sales Total	Chart Run
June 13, 2012	Daily Singles Chart	3	7,648	17,572+	5 weeks
June 13, 2012	Weekly Singles Chart	6	13,424	17,572+	5 weeks
June 13, 2012	Monthly Singles Chart	23	16,715	17,572+	5 weeks
June 13, 2012	Yearly Singles Chart	393	17,572	17,572+	5 weeks

== Release history ==
Country	Date	Format	Label
Japan	May 23, 2012 - June 13, 2012	Digital download (Lady Luck only)	Avex Trax
Japan	June 13, 2012	CD single, Digital download (Full single)	Avex Trax
Hong Kong	June 29, 2012	CD single, Digital download (Full single)	Avex Trax
Taiwan	June 29, 2012	CD single, Digital download (Full single)	Avex Trax
Thailand	July 26, 2012	CD single, Digital download (Full single)	GMM Grammy
