= Virgin (After School album) =

Studio album by After School
- Released: 29 April 2011
- Recorded: 2009–2011
- Genre: Dance-pop; electropop
- Length: 62:38
- Label: Pledis; LOEN

After School chronology
Happy Pledis 1st Album (2010)	Virgin (2011)	Red / Blue (2011)

Singles from Virgin
- 1. "Shampoo" Released: 27 April 2011

Virgin is the debut and only Korean studio album by South Korean girl group After School. They promoted the album by performing their lead single "Shampoo" along with a tap dance performance of "Let's Step Up". It was released on 29 April 2011 and contains 13 songs (including new recordings of their songs "Because of You", "When I Fall", and "Bang!"). The group has released three music videos for the album: "Shampoo", "Let's Step Up", and "Play Ur Love". This is only release as the nine-member line-up, with the addition of the member E-Young, and last release to feature member Bekah.

== History ==
Following the admission of ninth member, E-Young, Pledis Entertainment announced that After School will be having a comeback at the end of April 2011. They also announced that After School will release their first full-length studio album. Before the release of the album, several actions were made by the agency such as releasing a mini-album for the group leader Kahi and also the release of Orange Caramel's "Bangkok City".

On 18 April 2011, Pledis released a photo teaser of the album, featuring fourth generation member E-young. The track-listing and three other member photos followed, which were separated into third, second, and first generation members. On the day before the album's release, Pledis uploaded the video of their lead track "Shampoo" and "Let's Step Up!" on their official channel at YouTube. Their comeback stage was held on KBS Music Bank and they performed "Shampoo" and "Let's Step Up".

The album contains nine new tracks, three re-recorded songs, and a radio edit. Two of the new tracks, "Lean on Time" and "My Bell" are solo songs sung by main vocal members Raina and Jungah. Two songs from the album feature a Pre-School Girl: "Dream" features Yoonjo, who in 2012 debuted in the group Hello Venus, and "Funky Man", a duet between members Nana and Lizzy, features Kyung Min.

== Track listing ==
No.	Title	Lyrics	Music	Length
1.	"Let's Step Up"	Bekah	Junho Chang	1:45
2.	"Shampoo"	Won Tae Yeon	Daishi Dance, Tomoharu Moriya	4:35
3.	"Virgin"	Jang Ji-Won, Bekah	Niclas Lundin, Maria Marcus, H. Bharadia, Daishi Dance	3:32
4.	"Bang!" (2011 new recording)	Kim Hee-Sun, Bekah	Kim Tae Hyun	3:18
5.	"Play Ur Love"	Kim Boa	G-HIGH	3:48
6.	"Dream" (featuring Yoonjo (Hello Venus))	Kim Hee-Sun	Samuli Laiho, Daisuke Kahara	3:42
7.	"Because of You" (너 때문에; Neo Ttaemune) (2011 new recording)	Brave Brothers	Brave Brothers	3:56
8.	"Leaning Against Time" (시간에 기대어; Sigane Gidaeeo) (Raina solo)	Young Shin Cho	Yuchi Yeon	3:32
9.	"Are You Doing Okay?" ((Jungah, Raina, Nana & E-Young))	Hwang Sung Jin	Bakdeok Sang	3:41
10.	"Funky Man" (Nana vs Lizzy) (featuring Kyung Min [Pre-School Girl])	Chang Chun Ho, Hyun Sik Gong	Chang Chun Ho, Hyun Sik Gong	3:22
11.	"My Bell" (Jung-A solo)	Song Yang Ha	Song Yang Ha	4:00
12.	"When I Fall" (2011 new recording)	Kahi	Magnus Lidehäll, Jacob Olofsson, Viktoria Sandström	3:21
13.	"Shampoo" (radio edit)	Won Tae Yeon	Daishi Dance, Tomoharu Moriya	3:57
Total length:				46:29

== Charts ==
=== Weekly charts ===
Chart (2011)	Peak position
Japanese Albums (Oricon)	162
South Korean Albums (Gaon)	2
Taiwanese Albums (G-Music)	4

=== Monthly charts ===
Chart (2011)	Peak position
South Korean Albums (Gaon)	10

=== Year-end charts ===
Chart (2011)	Position
South Korean Albums (Gaon)	59

== Release history ==
Country	Date	Format	Label
South Korea	29 April 2011	CD, digital download	Pledis Entertainment, LOEN Entertainment
Worldwide	29 April 2011	Digital download	Pledis Entertainment, LOEN Entertainment
Japan	13 May 2011	CD	LOEN Entertainment
Philippines	23 July 2011	CD	Universal Records Philippines
Taiwan	24 April 2013	CD and DVD	Avex Taiwan
