= Shh (After School song) =

- CD only edition cover

Single by After School

from the album Dress to Kill
- B-side: "Rock It!"
- Released: January 29, 2014
- Recorded: 2013
- Genre: Deep house; dance
- Length: 4:55
- Label: Avex Trax
- Producer(s): Shinichi Osawa

After School Japanese singles chronology
"Heaven" (2013)	"Shh" (2014)

"Shh" is the sixth Japanese single from South Korean girl group After School. The single was released on January 29, 2014. The track is produced by Shinichi Osawa, who previously produced their fifth Japanese single "Heaven". It was the last Japanese single with Lee Jooyeon before she graduated in December 2014.

== Background ==
Following the release of their fifth Japanese single, the group announced that they would be releasing a new single at the beginning of the new year. The single is to be released in three versions: CD only edition (Type C), CD & DVD edition (Type A) and CD & Photobook (Type B) edition. There is also a mu-mo exclusive CD package, which includes 8 solo jackets for the single. The covers were revealed on December 20, 2013 and it showed After School dressing masculine, with all photos in black and white.

== Music video ==
A teaser for the music video was published on December 15, 2013 by Avex Trax which previewed the concept and a short snippet of the title track. The full music video for "Shh" was exclusively aired on MTV Japan on December 17, 2013 before being published on Avex Trax's official YouTube page three days later. The music video showcases the girls in a masculine concept, with the music video being in all black and white.

== Track listing ==
All editions:
No.	Title	Lyrics	Music	Length
1.	"Shh"	Kyasu Morizuki	Shinichi Osawa	4:55
2.	"Rock It!"	KAJI KATSURA	Erik Nyholm / Eric Palmqwist / Anton Fahlgren	3:40

CD only edition:
No.	Title	Music	Length
3.	"Shh" (Instrumental)	Shinichi Osawa
4.	"Rock It!" (Instrumental)

DVD (Type A):
No.	Title	Length
1.	"Shh" (Music video)
2.	"Shh" (Making of)

== Chart performance ==
=== Oricon chart ===
Released	Oricon Chart	Peak	Debut sales	Sales total
January 29, 2014	Daily Singles Chart	7	16,101 (weekly)	16,483
January 29, 2014	Weekly Singles Chart	12	16,101 (weekly)	16,483
January 29, 2014	Monthly Singles Chart	32	16,101 (weekly)	16,483

=== Billboard charts ===
Chart	Peak position
Billboard Japan Hot Singles Sales	28

== Release history ==
Country	Date	Format	Label
Japan	January 29, 2014	CD single, digital download	Avex Trax
