= After School (group) =

South Korean girl group (2009–2015)

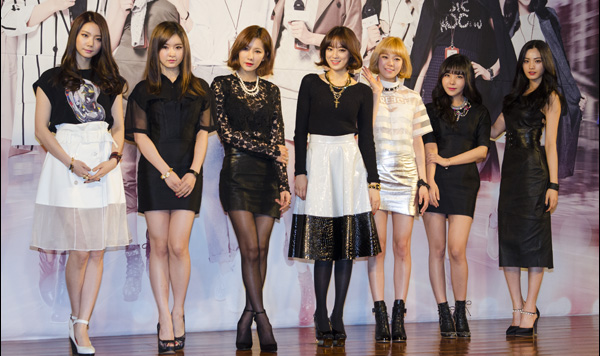
- After School at the After School's Beauty Bible press conference in January 2014: From left to right: Kaeun, E-Young, Jungah, Jooyeon, Lizzy, Raina, Nana

Background information
- Origin: Seoul, South Korea
- Genres: K-pop; dance-pop; electropop
- Years active: 2009–2024
- Labels: Pledis; Avex Trax; Avex Taiwan
- Spinoffs: After School Red; After School Blue; Orange Caramel
- Past members: Kahi; Jungah; Jooyeon; Bekah; Soyoung; Uee; Raina; Nana; Lizzy; E-Young; Kaeun
- Website: www.pledis.co.kr/ko/artist/detail/afterschool

After School (Korean: 애프터스쿨) was a South Korean girl group formed by Pledis Entertainment, with an admissions and graduation concept. After School officially debuted in January 2009 with the song "Ah!" from the single album New Schoolgirl. Following the addition of Uee in April of that year, they released "Diva", which won the "Rookie of the Month" award at the Cyworld Digital Music Awards.

Pledis Entertainment then announced the graduation of Soyoung before adding Raina and Nana for the release "Because of You" in November 2009, which topped the monthly digital chart for December. (Note: The Gaon Chart was not established until 2010, however by viewing the monthly chart of January 2010, "Because of You" is ranked 30 (down 29), indicating that it was the number 1 song of December 2009.) Follow-up singles "Bang!", "Shampoo", "Flashback" and "First Love" further consolidated their popularity and saw the additions of members Lizzy, E-Young and Kaeun, as well as the graduations of original members Bekah and Kahi. In 2010, the three newest members at that time formed the group's first subunit, Orange Caramel, and in 2011 a second subunit was formed when the group was split into two teams, A.S. Red and A.S. Blue, for the release of their fourth single album.

In the beginning of 2011, the group signed with Avex Trax to begin their promotions in Japan. The group made their first official appearance in Japan by collaborating with singer Namie Amuro for a song from her collaboration album Checkmate!, titled "Make it Happen". The song won Best Collaboration at the 2012 MTV Video Music Awards Japan. The group's debut single, a remake of their Korean hit "Bang!", was released in August that year and charted at number seven on the Oricon Singles Chart. Their debut Japanese album, Playgirlz, was released in 2012 and their second Japanese album, Dress to Kill, fronted by the Shinichi Osawa produced singles "Heaven" and "Shh", was released in 2014.

After School received attention for their unique live performances, often incorporating different performance styles into their songs, including drums, tap dancing and pole dancing. The group received the Minister of Culture, Sports and Tourism Commendation in 2011 and was ranked number five in Billboard's 2017 list of the Top 10 K-pop Girl Groups of the Past Decade. From 2015 onward, Pledis halted both After School and Orange Caramel promotions and the members have embarked on individual music, acting and modeling careers. In 2019, Lizzy revealed that all members had gradually gone their separate ways.

== History ==
=== Pre-debut ===
After School was first formed following Kahi's departure from Korean-American girl group S-Blush, as she began planning to produce a new group together with the current CEO of Pledis Entertainment. The first member other than Kahi was Bekah, who was a trainee while Kahi was in S-Blush. With Kahi's recommendation, Bekah was brought from Hawaii to South Korea. They were then introduced to Jungah, followed by Soyoung and Jooyeon, forming a five-member group.

After School as a group first made an unofficial appearance on December 29, 2008, at the SBS Song Festival. Kahi and Jungah performed "Play Girlz" alongside Son Dam Bi whilst the remaining members, Soyoung, Jooyeon, and Bekah served as backup dancers for Son Dam Bi's performance at the event.

=== 2009: New Schoolgirl, "Diva" and "Because of You" ===
In the start of 2009, a few days before After School's debut, Pledis Entertainment announced that the group's music concept was heavily influenced by the Pussycat Dolls. On January 15, the group released their debut single album New Schoolgirl. The album had three songs: the lead single "Ah!", "Play Girlz" and "Bad Guy" (나쁜놈). A teaser for their debut music video was released on the same day and gained over 100,000 views before its release the next day. On January 17, After School made their debut stage on television music program Music Core. Following promotional activities for "AH!", After School planned to continue to promote "Bad Guy" from their debut single New Schoolgirl. However, the track was deemed unsuitable and was banned from broadcast because a word of profanity was in the lyrics.

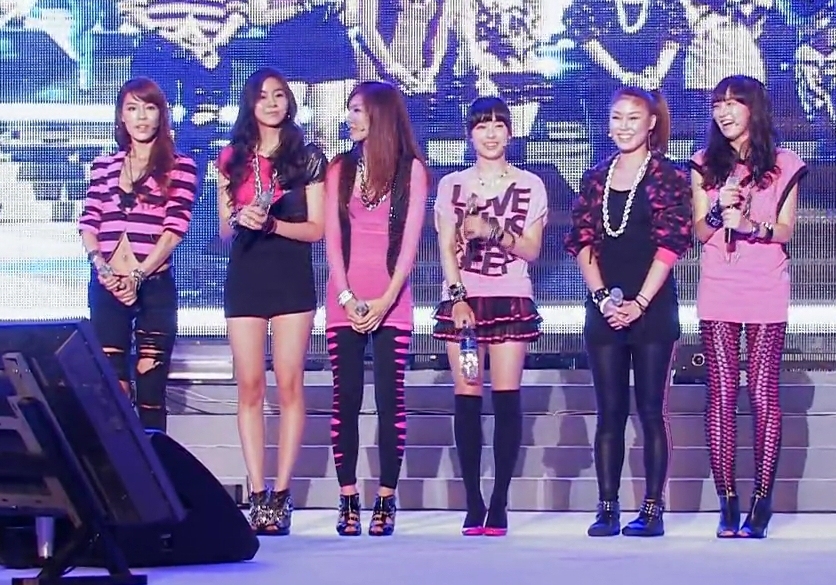
After School in July 2009

In April 2009, a new member, Uee, joined the group. The group then released their second single, "Diva" on April 9, 2009. They first performed the song on April 9, 2009, on M! Countdown. After School went on to win the "Rookie of the Month" award for the month of April 2009 at the Cyworld Digital Music Awards with the single. On May 21, the group released a cover of Morning Musume's "Love Machine", entitled "Dream Girl". In July, it was announced that the group would collaborate with Son Dam-bi for digital single "Amoled". It was released on July 16, as part of a promotion deal with Samsung. After School also became the opening act for The Pussycat Dolls's Doll Domination Tour along with label-mate Son Dam-bi for the Asian dates of the tour. On October 29, Soyoung officially graduated from the group to pursue an acting career. Two new members were then added to the group, Raina and Nana. On November 25, After School released their new single "Because of You" which had exceeded over 30,000 pre-orders. The song marked a change for the group to a more mature and sophisticated concept, and became extremely popular, winning three Mutizen awards for the group on SBS' Inkigayo.

=== 2010: "Bang!" and Orange Caramel ===
At the start of 2010, the group won the Best Rookie Award at both the Billboard Japan Music Awards and Seoul Music Awards. On March 25, After School released their third single album Bang! with new member Lizzy where the group took on a marching band concept. Kahi revealed that she was inspired after watching the American film Drumline, and had always wanted to do a marching band concept ever since she took to the stage as an After School member. The group practiced playing the drums for five months with a trainer for the single. The title track entered the Gaon Weekly Chart at number 2 and reached number 29 on the 2010 Gaon year-end digital chart with 2,374,731 digital downloads sold.

In June 2010, Raina, Nana, and Lizzy formed a sub-unit, revealed to be named Orange Caramel, and released their first mini-album. Orange Caramel's concept was revealed to be more lighthearted and sweet, unlike many girl groups that have taken on darker, sexier concepts. Orange Caramel debuted on June 16, with the title track "Magic Girl". Their debut mini-album, The First Mini Album, was released on June 21, 2010. The album was a commercial success, peaking at No. 2 on the Gaon Chart with the lead single "Magic Girl" peaking at No. 18. On December 6, 2010, Pledis Entertainment released Happy Pledis 1st Album that consisted of four tracks: the title song "Love Love Love", "Someone Is You", and instrumental versions of the two songs. A portion of the profits from the album was donated to the "Save the Children" organization. Bekah did not take part nor participate in the promotions for this album due to her two-month break in Hawaii visiting her parents.

=== 2011: Virgin, line-up changes, Japanese debut and A.S. Red & Blue ===
On January 27, Pledis Entertainment announced that they had signed a contract with Japanese record label AVEX TRAX for After School to begin activities in Japan by the end of March. After School started their Japanese activities by collaborating with Japanese R&B superstar Namie Amuro; featuring in the song "Make It Happen" for her collaboration album. This was the first release to include new member E-Young, who was previously revealed to the public during the group's performance of "Bang!" at SBS' Gayo Daejun on December 31, 2010. In March 2012, the song won Best Collaboration at the 2012 MTV Video Music Awards Japan.

After School's first studio album, Virgin, was released on April 29 with new member E-Young. The title track, "Shampoo", was composed by Japanese producer Daishi Dance, and the music video was released later that day. The music video for "Let's Step Up", the intro track on the album, featured After School performing a tap-dance routine, which was praised internationally by tap dancers such as Joseph Wiggan. After School began promotions for the "Shampoo" starting with KBS's Music Bank. Virgin was released in the Philippines on July 23, 2011, along with Bang! and Happy Pledis 1st Album, and it debuted at number one on the Philippines AstroChart, while Bang! debuted at number two and Happy Pledis 1st Album at number three.

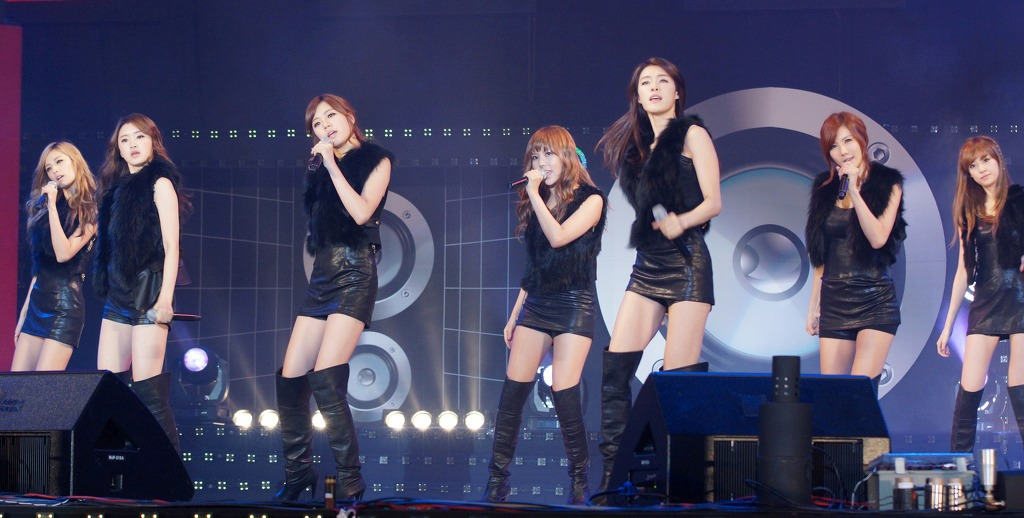
After School in December 2011

In June 2011, After School made a cameo as a female idol group, Pure, in the Korean horror film White: The Melody of the Curse. They performed segments of their hit song, "Bang!". On June 17, 2011, Pledis Entertainment announced that original member Bekah was to 'graduate' from After School after concluding promotions for Virgin. Bekah released her 'graduation' song "Take Me to the Place" on July 11. In July, Pledis Entertainment announced that After School would separate into two sub-units, A.S. Red & Blue, as part of the group's second comeback project for the year, with the units releasing "In the Night Sky" and "Wonder Boy" respectively. On July 9, After School held their second official Korean fan meeting at Sookmyung Women's University. 'Graduate' Bekah joined the fan meeting.

Prior to their official debut in Japan, After School held a showcase in Japan at Akasaka BLITZ in Tokyo on July 17, 2011, selling out tickets within one minute. After School officially debuted in Japan on August 17 with the release of their first Japanese single, "Bang!", which peaked at number seven on the Oricon Weekly Chart. After School also participated in the prestigious 'a-nation' concert tour as part of their Japanese promotions. After School's second Japanese single, "Diva", was released on November 23. The single was accompanied with a new Japanese song called "Ready to Love".

Happy Pledis 2011 was released on December 1 and featured all Pledis artists, including Son Dam-bi and pre-debut NU'EST (then called Pledis Boys). A portion of the "Happy Pledis" earnings were donated to UNICEF, and the album was also a gift to the fans. The group also partnered with Shibuya 109 for a Christmas advertising campaign. After School ended the year by headlining the MTV EXIT live concert along with American band The Click Five on December 17, 2011, in Phnom Penh, Cambodia.

=== 2012: Playgirlz, "Lady Luck/Dilly Dally", line-up changes and "Flashback" ===
After School's third Japanese single was a double A-side single consisting of two songs, "Rambling Girls" and a Japanese remake of their 2009 hit "Because of You". The single was released on January 25, 2012, and debuted at number six on the Oricon Daily Singles Chart. The single then debuted at number seven on the Oricon Weekly Singles Chart with sales of 12,110. Since then, the single has sold over 17,000 copies in Japan. On February 29, 2012, After School released a promotional digital single, "Just in Time", to promote the new album which was released the following month. "Just in Time" is also used in a Samantha Thavasa commercial featuring After School, who are models for the fashion company.

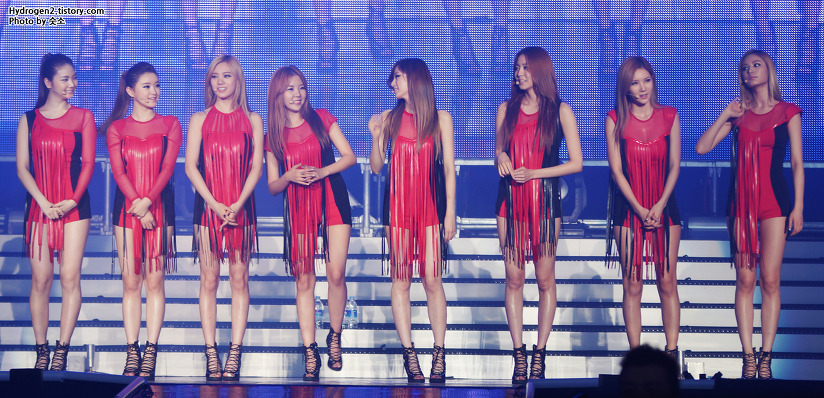
After School in July 2012

After School's first Japanese album, Playgirlz, was released on March 14, 2012. The album contains all their Japanese singles plus a Japanese version of their latest Korean single, "Shampoo", and six original Japanese songs. The regular edition of the album also included a Japanese version of Orange Caramel's "Shanghai Romance" as a bonus track. The album debuted at number six on the Oricon Daily Album Chart, with estimated sales of around 11,000 on the first day. The album debuted at number eight on the Oricon Weekly Album Chart with sales of 16,000. On April 23, 2012, Avex Trax announced that After School would release their fourth Japanese single, "Lady Luck/Dilly Dally", on June 13, 2012. The single is a double A-side single and the regular edition also contains an additional track, "Slow Love", which is the song used on the Eyefull Home commercial. The single debuted at number 3 on Oricon's Daily Singles Chart with sales of 7,648 and at number 6 on Oricon's Weekly Singles Chart with sales of 13,424 respectively. As of the end of 2012, the single has sold over 17,000 copies in Japan.

After School started their promotion tour for Playgirlz in late April. With a total of four dates, the tour kicked off at Zepp Tokyo on April 27, followed by Zepp Nagoya on April 28 and Namba, Osaka on April 30. The tour's first stop at Zepp Tokyo on April 27 marked the admission and first performance of new member Kaeun, who joined the group on stage to perform "Let's Do It" and the Japanese version of "Bang!". Kaeun continued to make appearances for the other stops on the tour. On June 5, Pledis Entertainment announced that Kahi would graduate from the group to pursue a solo career, as well as to study acting. After School's tour finished on June 17 at Tokyo Dome City Hall, which was also the last time Kahi performed with the group. She stayed with the group until September to help with promotion.

After School's fifth Korean single album, Flashback, and a music video for the title track were released on June 20. This was the first release to include new member Kaeun, as well as being the first release to not include Kahi. Jungah, who was revealed to be the group's new leader after the departure of Kahi, said that the album's title refers to the group's desire to return to their original image and produce music for all ages.

=== 2013–2015: "First Love", Dress to Kill, line-up changes ===
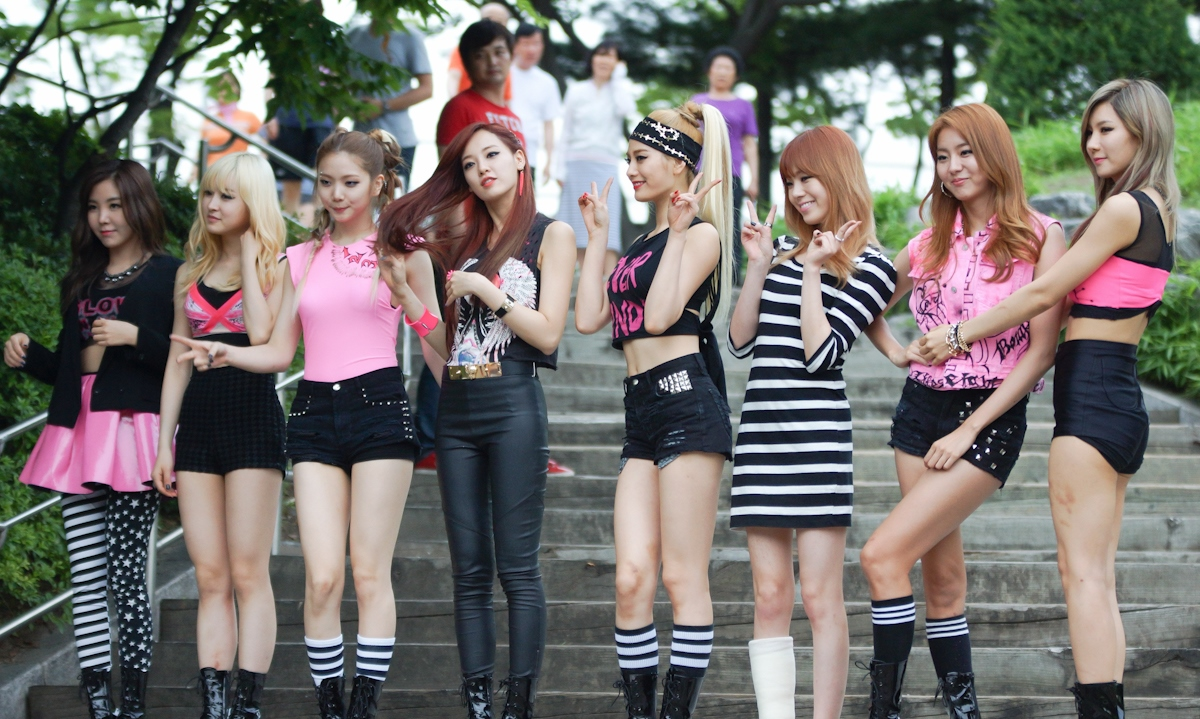
After School at a fan meeting in 2013

After School held a fan meeting in Thailand on February 23, 2013, and performed in front of over 3,000 fans. Due to the success of the fan meeting in Bangkok, After School held another fan meeting in Taiwan on March 30. This meeting was also held as a charity event with the proceeds from the ticket sales going to children in need. A total of 1,000,000 Taiwan dollars was raised for charity.

The group released their first compilation album, The Best of After School, on March 27, 2013, along with their first live DVD of their Playgirlz Japanese concert. Their sixth Korean maxi-single, "First Love", was released on June 13, and was produced by Brave Brothers. This single marked the first time the group had worked with the producer since "Because of You" in 2009. Their fifth Japanese single "Heaven", was released on October 2. "Heaven" debuted at number 6 on the Oricon Daily Singles Chart with over 18,596 copies sold during its debut week. On December 19, the music video for "Shh", the group's sixth Japanese single, was released on YouTube. On February 20, 2014, After School released a single titled "Week" in collaboration with Brave Brothers for his 10th anniversary project.

After School's second full-length Japanese album, Dress to Kill, was released on March 19, 2014. The album has twelve tracks including "Heaven", "Shh", and "Ms. Independent", the title track. The album was released in three versions: a CD + DVD version which includes music videos and a special fanmeeting video, a CD version with a bonus track of the Japanese version of "Flashback", and another CD version (Mu-mo special) with the bonus track "Lucky Girl".

At the beginning of 2014, After School began filming a beauty variety show for KBS titled After School's Beauty Bible. The show focused on the members becoming beauty editors and providing the viewers with information and tips about Korean beauty, with topics ranging from makeup to style and trends. The show became quite successful and aired in over 100 countries through KBS World's YouTube channel. The second season of the show began airing in September. After School's second Japanese tour, "Dress to SHINE", began on November 21, 2014, in Tokyo and ended on November 24 in Osaka. On December 31, Jooyeon's contract with Pledis Entertainment expired, and she announced her graduation from After School that same day. Jooyeon continued to promote as a member of After School in Japan, as her contract with AVEX TRAX had not yet expired. After School released their music video for "Shine" on February 9, 2015, to promote their Japanese compilation album BEST which was released on March 18. Jooyeon officially graduated from the group on March 20, at a fan-club event at Negishi Tokyo Cinema in Tokyo, held to promote the album, where she received her graduation diploma.

=== 2016–2019: Line-up changes and solo endeavors ===
On January 28, 2016, Pledis Entertainment announced that Jungah had graduated from the group after seven years of activity due to the expiration of her contract. With the lack of group promotions, members Uee and Nana took a more active role as actresses. MBC's Marriage Contract, starring Uee, began airing on March 5. In the drama, she played the character of Kang Hye-soo, a single mother with a terminal illness who enters into a contract marriage. In November, Uee starred in the MBC drama Night Light, alongside Jin Goo and Lee Yo-won. She played the character of a poor woman who is able to turn her life around with an opportunity. Nana made her acting debut in a support role in TvN's The Good Wife, a Korean remake of the American drama of the same name, with the show debuting on July 8. On June 17, Raina's second duet with San E, titled "Sugar and Me", was released, peaking at number five on the Gaon chart. Lizzy joined the hosting lineup for FashionN's Please Take Care of My Vanity 2. Kaeun had been focusing on her DJ gigs, and had confirmed an acting debut in pre-produced drama The Idolmaster KR, which premiered in early 2017. E-Young opened a music academy on September 19, featuring piano, vocal, bass, and electric guitar lessons as well as dance and singing classes for those wishing to become idols.

On May 31, 2017, Pledis Entertainment announced that Uee had graduated from the group after eight years of activity due to the expiration of her contract. After School was to continue as five members for the first time in eight years since the group debuted. On May 1, 2018, Pledis Entertainment announced that Lizzy had graduated from After School after eight years of activity due to the expiration of her contract. Pledis Entertainment later stated that despite this, Lizzy would still continue to be a member of After School's subgroup, Orange Caramel. Days later, it was reported that Kaeun will be the center for the Korean group in "Nekkoya (Pick Me)", Mnet's Produce 48 official song, confirming her participation in the show. Despite never leaving the top 12 during the show's run, and ranking 1st for more weeks than any other contestant, Kaeun placed 14th during the finale of Produce 48 and therefore failed to make it to the final line-up. It was later revealed that Kaeun had placed 5th, making it into the final lineup, but was artificially removed from it via vote manipulation.

On May 15, 2019, Lizzy mentioned that After School members gradually went their separate ways. Kaeun and Raina left the label in July and December 2019, respectively, following their contract expiration. On July 5, 2019, Kaeun released "Remember You" (기억할게) her first digital single that marked her departure from Pledis Entertainment. In December 2019, E-Young announced on Instagram that she also left the group and company following her contract expiration and she is working on her solo album.

On June 3, 2021, members Jungah, Jooyeon, Bekah, Raina, and Kahi reunited as After School as part of a guest appearance on SBS' internet program MMTG for its special Hidden Gems segment. After deciding on "Bang" and "Diva" during the program, the five members performed the two songs as part of MMTG's Hidden Gems concert on June 12.

On August 30, 2024, it was announced that Nana had left Pledis following the end of her contract.

== Members ==
After School has an admission-graduation system, where members are added or withdrawn in a "natural" manner.

Former members

- Kahi
- Jungah
- Uee
- Nana
- Jooyeon
- Bekah
- Soyoung
- Raina
- E-Young
- Lizzy
- Kaeun

== Sub-units ==
=== Orange Caramel ===
Orange Caramel was the first After School unit group, consisting of Raina, Nana, and Lizzy. They debuted in June 2010 with "Magic Girl". Their last release, "The Gangnam Avenue", was released in 2014.

=== A.S. Red & Blue ===
A.S. Red & Blue were special unit groups decided by fan voting. The line-ups were finalized on July 11, 2011. A.S. Red consisted of Kahi, Jungah, Uee and Nana, while A.S. Blue consisted of Jooyeon, Raina, Lizzy, and E-Young. Two single albums were released on July 20, 2011. The Red single album had two songs, "In The Night Sky" (밤 하늘에 Bam Haneure) and "Hollywood", and the Blue single album also had two songs, "Wonder Boy" and "Lady". NU'EST and Seventeen's S.Coups served as back-up dancers for the "Wonder Boy" music video and during live performances on stage.

== Endorsements ==
In 2009, After School were the endorsement models for brands such as Samsung and Adidas, collaborating with label-mate Son Dam-bi for Samsung's Amoled. On June 29, 2011, After School became the models for The Saem Cosmetics alongside popular star Lee Seung Gi. In September 2011, they became endorsement models for Landrover Shoes with members Kahi, Juyeon, Uee and Nana releasing a commercial film for the brand. In August 2011, After School collaborated with Hello Kitty for the release of their Japanese debut single "Bang!", and again in 2012 for their first Japanese album, Playgirlz. They were also models for Shibuya109, starring in a Christmas campaign commercial where large banners featuring festive-themed photos of After School measuring 21 meters by 9 meters were plastered onto and inside the Shibuya 109 building.

In January 2012, After School was chosen as the endorsement models for Samantha Thavasa. In April 2012, the group also became models for deodorant brand Rexena. They were also chosen as representatives for the Japanese food company Hanryuen and fashion brand CECIL McBEE. In February 2013, After School and label-mate Son Dam-bi became the new faces of the women's SPA (Specialty Private Apparel) brand Mixxo, and continued their collaboration with the brand in 2014.

== Discography ==
- Virgin (2011)
- Playgirlz (2012)
- Dress to Kill (2014)

== Filmography ==
Reality shows

- 2009: MTV Diary of After School
- 2010: Playgirlz School
- 2013–2014: After School's Beauty Bible
- 2014–2015: After School's Beauty Bible 2014 F/W

Dramas

- 2009: You're Beautiful
- 2016: "The Good Wife"

Movies

- 2011: White: The Melody of the Curse

DVD

- 2013: Afterschool First Japan Tour 2012 -Playgirlz- DVD

Radio

- 2012–2014: Afterschool Playgirlz Radio ~ 1st Japan Radio Show

== Tours and concerts ==
Headlining

- 2012: Playgirlz 1st Japan Tour "PlayGirlz"
- 2014: Playgirlz 2nd Japan Tour "Dress to Shine"

Supporting

- 2009: Doll Domination Tour

== Awards and nominations ==
The name of the award ceremony, year presented, award category, nominee(s) and the result of the award
Award ceremony	Year	Category	Nominee / work	Result	Ref.
Asia Model Awards	2014	Popularity Award	After School	Won	
Billboard Japan Music Awards	2010	K-Pop New Artist of the Year 2009	After School	Won	
Cyworld Digital Music Awards	2009	Rookie of the Month – April	"Diva"	Won	
Golden Disk Awards	2012	Disk Daesang	Virgin	Nominated	
Golden Disk Awards	2012	Disk Bonsang	Virgin	Nominated	
Golden Disk Awards	2012	Popularity Award	After School	Nominated	
Golden Disk Awards	2013	Single Album Award	"Flashback"	Nominated	
Golden Disk Awards	2013	Popularity Award	After School	Nominated	
Korea International Awards	2011	International Artist of the Year	After School	Nominated	
Korea International Awards	2011	Top 5 International Artists	After School	Won	
Korea International Awards	2011	Best J-Pop Artist	After School	Nominated	
Korea International Awards	2011	Top 5 J-Pop Artists	After School	Nominated	
Korea International Awards	2011	Best K-Pop Music	After School	Nominated	
Korea International Awards	2011	Top 5 K-Pop Music	After School	Nominated	
Korea International Awards	2011	Best Female Group	After School	Nominated	
Korea International Awards	2011	Top 5 Female Groups	After School	Won	
Korea International Awards	2011	Most Popular	After School	Nominated	
Korea Lifestyle Awards	2009	Best Style Icon	After School	Won	
Korean Culture Entertainment Awards	2011	Korea Entertainment News Award	After School	Won	
Korean Culture Entertainment Awards	2012	Best Female Singer	After School	Nominated	
Korean Visual Arts Festival	2010	Photogenic Award	Orange Caramel	Won	
Melon Music Awards	2009	Bonsang Award	After School	Nominated	
Melon Music Awards	2009	Star Award	After School	Nominated	
Melon Music Awards	2010	Music Video of the Year	"Bang!"	Nominated	
Melon Music Awards	2011	Bonsang Award	After School	Nominated	
Mnet Asian Music Awards	2009	Best New Female Artists	"Diva"	Nominated	
MTV Video Music Awards Japan	2012	Best Collaboration Video	"Make it Happen" (with Namie Amuro)	Won	
Seoul Music Awards	2010	Best Newcomer Award	After School	Won	
Seoul Music Awards	2012	Bonsang Award	Orange Caramel	Nominated	
Seoul Music Awards	2012	Popularity Award	Orange Caramel	Nominated	
Seoul Music Awards	2013	Bonsang Award	"Flashback"	Nominated	
Seoul Music Awards	2013	Popularity Award	"Flashback"	Nominated	
Seoul Music Awards	2013	Bonsang Award	"Lipstick"	Nominated	
Seoul Music Awards	2013	Popularity Award	"Lipstick"	Nominated	
Seoul Music Awards	2014	Bonsang Award	"First Love"	Nominated	
Seoul Music Awards	2014	Popularity Award	"First Love"	Nominated	
SBS MTV Best of the Best	2012	Best Comic Video	"Lipstick"	Won	
SBS MTV Best of the Best	2012	Best Rival (vs Secret)	Orange Caramel	Nominated	
Yahoo! Asia Buzz Awards	2009	Top Buzz Star: Female Singer Category	After School	Nominated	

=== State honors ===
Name of country, year given, and name of honor
Country	Year	Honor	Ref.
South Korea (Note: Honors are given at the Korean Popular Culture and Arts Awards, arranged by the Korea Creative Content Agency and hosted by the Ministry of Culture, Sports and Tourism. They are awarded to those who have contributed to the arts and South Korea's pop culture.)	2011	Minister of Culture, Sports and Tourism Commendation	
