= Because of You (single album) =

Single album by After School
- Released: 25 November 2009
- Recorded: 2009
- Genre: Dance-pop
- Label: Pledis
- Producer: Brave Brothers

After School chronology
| New Schoolgirl (2009) | Because of You (2009) | Bang! (2010) |

Because of You (Korean: 너 때문에; RR: Neo Ttaemune) is the second single album by South Korean girl group After School. It was released on 25 November 2009, by Pledis Entertainment. The group also released an official remix version of the lead single of the same name on 21 January 2010. The title track was written, composed, and arranged by Brave Brothers, and it was the first release without member So-young and with new members Raina and Nana.

== Background ==
Before After School made their comeback with "Because of You", Pledis announced the graduation of Soyoung and that two new members are to be added: Raina and Nana. Pledis then released teaser pictures showcasing a more mature concept with the members dressed in black and white suits, a change to their sexy concept that they debuted with. On 23 November, a music video teaser was uploaded and gained over 200,000 views in 24 hours. A remixed version of the song was released in January 2010.

== Promotion ==
The group officially made their comeback on SBS's Inkigayo performing "When I Fall" and "Because of You". The group then performed on Inkigayo, KBS's Music Bank and MBC's Show! Music Core on a weekly basis to promote the song. After School did not perform on Mnet's M Countdown due to conflicts between Pledis and the broadcasting company. Pledis stated that the conflicts were "concerning the fairness of the MAMA awards."

== Commercial performance ==
Prior to the album, the lead single "Because of You" had accumulated over 30,000 pre-orders, a considerably high number for a small-agency group. Shortly after the album's release, "Because of You" topped various online music charts in South Korea and was an instant hit. The song achieved a daily and weekly "all-kill" by topping all daily and weekly charts on online music stores. "Because of You" then debuted at number 1 on the Gaon Digital Chart for the month of December, which was a rarity for rookie groups from small agencies. It also went on to win a triple crown on Inkigayo.

The single album had similar success, debuting at number 2 on the Gaon Weekly Album Chart and it managed to stay in the top 10 for 3 weeks. It has since gone on to sell over 20,000 copies in South Korea. The remixed version of "Because of You" debuted at number 76 on the Gaon Weekly Singles Chart, and the track "When I Fall" debuted at number 82 on the chart due to After School briefly promoting the song after they finished promotions for the title track.

== Music video ==
A music video teaser for "Because of You" was unveiled on 23 November and quickly gained over 200,000 views before the release of the full music video. The full music video was released on 25 November along with the release of the single.

== Accolades ==
Music program awards
| Program | Date |
|---|---|
| Inkigayo | 20 December 2009 |
| Inkigayo | 27 December 2009 |
| Inkigayo | 24 January 2010 |

== Track listing ==
| No. | Title | Length |
|---|---|---|
| 1. | "Because of You" (너 때문에) | 3:47 |
| 2. | "When I Fall" | 3:20 |
| 3. | "Diva" | 3:18 |
| 4. | "Because of You" (너 때문에; Instrumental) | 3:47 |
| Total length: | | 14:12 |

== Charts ==
=== Weekly charts ===
| Chart (2010) | Peak position |
|---|---|
| South Korean (Gaon) | 16 |

=== Monthly charts ===
| Chart (2009) | Peak position |
|---|---|
| South Korean (Gaon) | 6 |
