= Son Dam-bi =

South Korean singer and actress (born 1983)

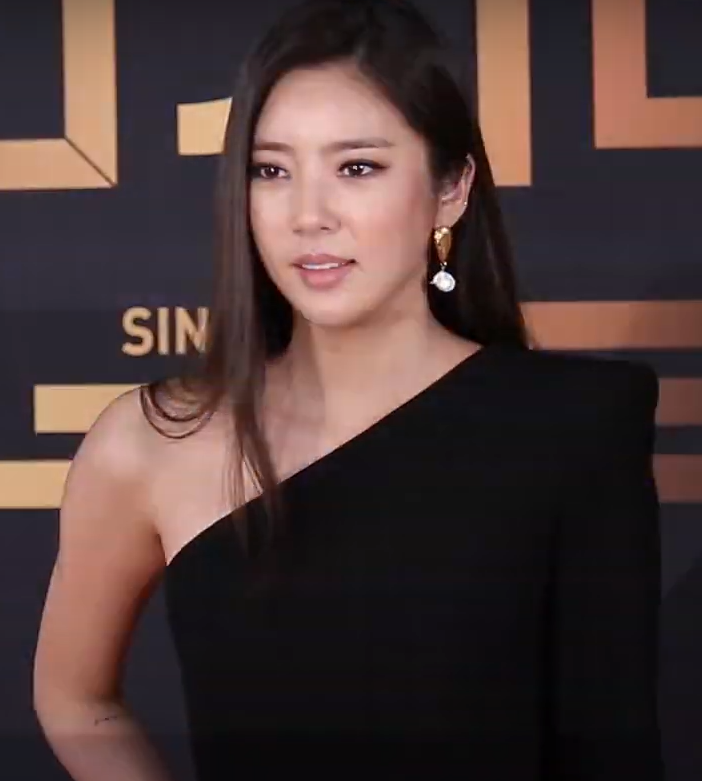
- Son at 2019 KBS Drama Awards
- Born: September 25, 1983 (age 43); Seoul, South Korea
- Occupations: Singer; actress; entertainer
- Agent: H& Entertainment
- Spouse: Lee Kyou-hyuk (m. 2022)
- Children: 1
- Musical career
- Genres: K-pop; R&B
- Years active: 2007–present
- Labels: Pledis; Blitzway Entertainment

Korean name
- Hangul: 손담비
- Hanja: 孫淡妃
- RR: Son Dambi
- MR: Son Tambi

Son Dam-bi (Korean: 손담비; born September 25, 1983) is a South Korean singer, actress and entertainer. She began her career as a solo singer in 2007. She also made her acting debut in the 2009 Korean drama Dream.

== Career ==
Son first came to fame when she appeared in a commercial for an MP3 player alongside Poppin' Hyun Joon.

Prior to her debut, MSN Japan made a video documentary capturing her pre-debut training and rehearsals, which attracted 480,000 visitors in five days. Son trained with a well-known American choreographer in preparation for this album, and people began calling her the female version of Rain.

Son's debut single features five tracks that show off her vocal and dancing talents. Her debut single, "Cry Eye", was produced and composed by Jang Joon-ho, who previously wrote MC Mong's "180 Degrees" and Jang Woo-hyuk's "Last Game". The lyrics were written by Brian Kim, who also penned Shinhwa's Once in A Lifetime.

Son joined MBC's reality show We Got Married, being paired with Marco in late 2008 as part of the second group of couples. Their last episode was on February 2, 2009.

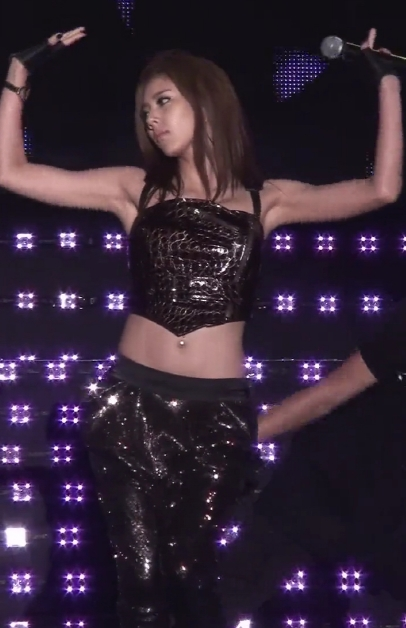
Son performing in Dongdaemun on October 2, 2010

It was also announced that Son would be part of the cast for Hype Nation, a film that has been labelled a "world movie". However, as the movie was delayed, Son released an EL with the single "Toyoil Bamae" ("토요일 밤에", "On a Saturday Night"). The song became her first #1 hit, topping various on- and offline charts, including M! Countdown (within 20 days), two wins on KBS' Music Bank, and a three-week chart-topping run on SBS' Inkigayo. The songs' routine features Son in various 80's fashions, transforming her into a "retro fashionista".

She then starred in SBS drama Dream with Joo Jin-mo and Kim Bum, marking her debut as an actress. As a result of her portrayal in Dream, as the Taebo instructor Park So-yeon, it won her the SBS Drama Awards New Star Award.

=== Return to South Korea ===
After training in the United States after "Cry Eye", Son returned to Korea and released an EP, Mini Album Vol.1, with a focus on electronica (departing from her previous style of crunk pop) on April 29, 2008. The lead single, titled "Bad Boy", was produced by Brave Brothers. Kahi (former leader of After School and Pledis labelmate) was her dance teacher and was featured in the "Bad Boy" music video.

In September 2008, she returned with the single "미쳤어" ("Crazy"). The song featured a "chair dance" that has become popular with the Korean public; it has since been upgraded to a "sofa dance". The dance has been copied and parodied by many people, including Hyun Young, Infinity Challenge comedy team member No Hongchul, comedian Shin Bong-sun, and Lee Soo-young.

Her follow-up song in 2009, "Toyoilbamae" (Korean: "토요일밤에", "On a Saturday Night"), was a success. She then released her next EP, The Queen.

=== 2011–present: "Lights and Shadows" and "Dripping Tears" comeback ===
Starting in 2011, Son starred in a drama called Lights and Shadows. It was first broadcast on November 28, 2011. She finished filming in June 2012, with the drama concluding on July 3, 2012. She also released an OST for the drama called "Everything" on January 10, 2012.

It was confirmed by Pledis Entertainment that Son would make a comeback in Korea sometime in the summer. Eventually, a representative from Pledis Entertainment stated that Son had finished recording her album and was in the midst of shooting photos for the album jacket. The album was pushed back before eventually being released on November 12, 2012. The lead single, "Dripping Tears", was produced by Brave Brothers. The album contained six songs, including the title track of the same name and a 'G. Remix version' of "Dripping Tears." The music video of "Dripping Tears" was released a day after the album. She first performed the song on November 15, on M Countdown.

Son's contract with Pledis Entertainment ended in June 2015. It was soon announced that Son had signed with KeyEast for her future activities.

In 2019, she starred in the romantic comedy thriller When the Camellia Blooms.

In September 2020, Son signed with new agency H& Entertainment after leaving KeyEast. In August 2022, Son renewed her contract with H& Entertainment.

== Personal life ==
Son married former South Korean national speed skater Lee Kyou-hyuk on May 13, 2022 in a private ceremony. Their romantic relationship started in September 2021. On September 26, 2024, Son announced her pregnancy. She gave birth to a daughter on April 11, 2025.

== Discography ==
=== Studio albums ===
Title	Album details	Peak chart positions	Sales
Title	Album details	KOR	Sales
Type B	Released: March 23, 2009; Label: Pledis Entertainment; Format: CD, digital download	—N/a	

=== Compilation albums ===
Title	Album details	Peak chart positions	Sales
Title	Album details	KOR	Sales
Son Dam Bi Remix Vol. 1	Released: November 20, 2008; Label: Pledis Entertainment; Format: Digital download	—N/a	

=== Extended plays ===
Title	Album details	Peak chart positions	Sales
Title	Album details	KOR	Sales
Cry Eye	Released: June 21, 2007; Label: Pledis Entertainment; Format: CD; Track list: 1. Cry Eye; 2. Girl Like That (feat. ED & Hwa Young Song); 3. Alone; 4. Start (feat. David Kim); 5. Cry Eye (Inst.)	31	KOR: 1,185+
Mini Album Vol. 1	Released: April 29, 2008; Label: Pledis Entertainment; Format: CD, digital download; Track list: 1. Intro; 2. Bad Boy (featuring Kahi); 3. 반대말 (Opposite); 4. 입다 질린 옷 (The Clothes I'm Sick Of Wearing); 5. 그만하자 (Forget It); 6. Bad Boy (Ballad Version); 7. Bad Boy (Instrumental)	20	—N/a
The Second Mini Album	Released: September 18, 2008; Label: Pledis Entertainment; Format: CD, digital download; Track list: 1. 미쳤어 (Crazy) (Feat. Eric); 2. 투명인간 (Invisible Person); 3. No Sympathy; 4. PLAY; 5. 미쳤어 (Crazy) (Instrumental)	11	—N/a
The Queen	Released: July 8, 2010; Label: Pledis Entertainment; Format: CD, digital download	3	—N/a
Dripping Tears	Released: November 12, 2012; Label: Pledis Entertainment; Format: CD, digital download	3	—N/a

=== Singles ===
Title	Year	Peak chart positions	Sales	Album
Title	Year	KOR	Sales	Album
"Cry Eye"	2007	No data		Cry Eye
"Bad Boy" (feat. Kahi)	2008	No data		Mini Album Vol. 1
"Invisible Person" (투명인간)	2008	No data		The Second Mini Album
"Crazy" (미쳤어) (feat. Eric Mun)	2008	No data		The Second Mini Album
"On A Saturday Night" (토요일밤에)	2009	No data		Type B
"Amoled" (feat. After School)	2009	No data		Non-album single
"Can't U See"	2010	12	KOR: 1,184,735	The Queen
"Queen"	2010	3	KOR: 966,919	The Queen
"dB Rider" (New version)	2010	70		Non-album singles
"One Kiss" (with FPM)	2011	64		Non-album singles
"Love Letter" (with After School)	2011	37	KOR: 276,337	Happy Pledis 2012
"Dripping Tears" (눈물이 주르륵)	2012	10	KOR: 666,741	Dripping Tears
"Red Candle"	2013	26	KOR: 46,049	Non-album single

== Filmography ==
=== Film ===
Year	Title	Role	Ref.
2018	The Accidental Detective 2: In Action	Yoon Sa-hee	
2018	Too Hot To Die	Rose of Betrayal	

=== Television series ===
Year	Title	Role	Ref.
2009	Dream	Park So-yeon	
2011–2012	Lights and Shadows	Yoo Chae-young	
2014	What Happens to My Family?	Kwon Hyo-jin	
2016	Mrs. Cop 2	Shin Yeo-ok	
2019	When the Camellia Blooms	Choi Hyang-mi / Choi Go-woon	

=== Television show ===
Year	Title	Role	Notes	Ref.
2008–2009	We Got Married	Cast Member	with Marco	
2018–2019	Village Survival, the Eight	Cast Member	Season 1–2	
2019	Try It	Cast Member		
2020–2021	I Live Alone	Cast Member		
2021	Sister Shoots	Host		
2022	Same Bed, Different Dreams 2: You Are My Destiny	Cast Member		
2022	Scance, not Hocance	Host		

== Awards and nominations ==
Name of the award ceremony, year presented, category, nominee of the award, and the result of the nomination
Award ceremony	Year	Category	Nominee / Work	Result	Ref.
APAN Star Awards	2021	Best Supporting Actress	When the Camellia Blooms	Nominated	
Asia Model Awards	2011	BBF Popular Singer	Son Dam-bi	Won	
Asia Model Awards	2020	Popularity Award in Female Actor Category	Son Dam-bi	Won	
Baeksang Arts Awards	2020	Best Supporting Actress – Television	When the Camellia Blooms	Nominated	
Brand of the Year Awards	2020	Multi Entertainer Female of the Year	Son Dam-bi	Won	
Chinese TOP Awards Concert	2011	Foreign Artist with the Best Stage Presence	Son Dam-bi	Won	
Golden Disk Awards	2009	Digital Bonsang	Son Dam-bi	Won	
KBS Drama Awards	2014	Best Supporting Actress	What Happens to My Family?	Nominated	
KBS Drama Awards	2019	Best New Actress	When the Camellia Blooms	Won	
KBS Drama Awards	2019	Netizen Award, Actress	When the Camellia Blooms	Nominated	
Korean Culture and Entertainment Awards	2012	Best New Actress	Lights and Shadows	Won	
Korea Drama Awards	2012	Excellence Award, Actress	Lights and Shadows	Nominated	
MBC Drama Awards	2012	Excellence Award, Actress in a Special Project Drama	Lights and Shadows	Won	
MBC Entertainment Awards	2020	Best Couple Award with Sung Hoon	I Live Alone	Nominated	
MBC Entertainment Awards	2020	Excellence Award in Variety Category – Female	I Live Alone	Won	
Mnet Asian Music Awards	2009	Best Female Artist	Son Dam-bi	Nominated	
Mnet Asian Music Awards	2009	Best House & Electronic	Son Dam-bi	Nominated	
Mnet Asian Music Awards	2010	Best Female Artist	"Queen"	Nominated	
Mnet 20's Choice Awards	2009	Hot Body Female	Son Dam-bi	Nominated	
Mnet 20's Choice Awards	2009	Hot Style Icon	Son Dam-bi	Nominated	
Mnet 20's Choice Awards	2009	Hot Performance	Son Dam-bi	Nominated	
SBS Drama Awards	2009	New Star Award	Dream	Won	
SBS Drama Awards	2016	Excellence Award, Actress in a Genre Drama	Mrs. Cop 2	Nominated	
Seoul Music Awards	2009	Bonsang	Son Dam-bi	Won	
Seoul Music Awards	2010	Bonsang	Son Dam-bi	Won	
Seoul Music Awards	2011	Bonsang	Son Dam-bi	Won	
Seoul Music Awards	2013	Bonsang	Son Dam-bi	Nominated	
Seoul Music Awards	2013	Popularity Award	Son Dam-bi	Nominated	
