= Pledis Entertainment =

South Korean entertainment management company

Pledis Entertainment, Inc.
- Native name: 플레디스 엔터테인먼트
- Type: Private subsidiary
- Industry: Music; entertainment
- Founded: 2007; 19 years ago
- Founder: Han Sung-soo
- Headquarters: 13F 42 Hangang-daero, Yongsan-gu, Seoul (Hangangno 3-ga, Yongsan Trade Center), South Korea
- Area served: Worldwide
- Key people: Kim Yeon-soo (CEO and president)
- Services: Music production; Artists management
- Revenue: ▼ ₩288.48 billion (US$215.24 million) (2025)
- Net income: ▼ ₩54.84 billion (US$40.92 million) (2025)
- Total assets: ▲ ₩282.93 billion (US$211.1 million) (2025)
- Total equity: ▲ ₩240.82 billion (US$179.68 million) (2025)
- Owner: Hybe Corporation (90%); Han Sung-soo (5%); Sony Music Solutions (5%)
- Number of employees: 145 (2025)
- Parent: Hybe Corporation (Note: since May 2020)
- Subsidiaries: Pledis China (Note: since 2018); Pledis Music Services (Note: since 2026); ABD
- Website: www.pledis.co.kr

Pledis Entertainment, Inc. (Korean: 플레디스 엔터테인먼트, stylised as PLEDIS Entertainment) is a South Korean entertainment company founded by Han Sung-soo in 2007. The label is home to Bumzu, Hwang Min-hyun, and groups Seventeen and TWS. Its name originates from the Pleiades, a star cluster in the constellation Taurus.

On May 25, 2020, Hybe Corporation became its majority shareholder. Despite this, Pledis still operates as an independent label, but under affiliation with the Hybe Labels.

== History ==
=== 2007–2012: Founding and early artists ===
Company logo used from 2007 to 2025

Pledis Entertainment was founded in 2007. Son Dam-bi was the first artist to debut under Pledis, and was dubbed the 'female Rain' by media outlets. In its beginning stages, the agency did not have management premises, only a practice room. In January 2009, Pledis debuted its first girl group, After School. A sub-unit of After School called Orange Caramel was formed in 2010, consisting of members Nana, Lizzy and Raina.

In December 2010, Pledis released Happy Pledis 1st Album, featuring After School, which included the tracks "Love Love Love" and "Someone Is You". Happy Pledis was a series of albums to be released annually, featuring Pledis artists, with proceeds going to charity. Proceeds from the first album were donated to Save the Children.

In July 2011, two further sub-units of After School were created, A.S. Red and A.S. Blue. Happy Pledis 2nd Album, featuring Son Dam-bi, After School, Pledis Boys, and Yoo Ara, was released in December, with proceeds going to UNICEF.

=== 2012–2020: Joint ventures and development ===
In March 2012, Pledis debuted their first boy band NU'EST. In May 2012, the agency joint ventures with Fantagio and debuted a six-member girl group, Hello Venus. In June 2012, Kahi "graduated" from After School and continued with her solo career under Pledis.

On November 11, 2013, Pledis Entertainment and Chinese agency Yuehua Entertainment held a press conference titled "Yuehua Entertainment X Pledis" at the Beijing Banquet Hall, marking the start of a collaboration under which the sub-unit NU'EST-M was formed with the addition of Chinese member Jason Fulong Fei, known as JA. The six-member team performed for the first time at the press event.

On July 21, 2014, the partnership between Pledis and Fantagio was dissolved. The two members under Pledis, Yoo Ara and Yoonjo, left Hello Venus while the four members under Fantagio continued as a group under the same name. In December 2014, Jooyeon graduated from After School after her contract expired. That month, Kahi announced to parted ways with the agency.

Thirteen-member boy group Seventeen debuted in May 2015, after training under the company for several years. In June 2015, Son Dam-bi parted ways with the agency after ten years.

In March 2016, Pledis formed a pre-debut team called "Pledis Girlz". Some of the pre-debut team members Nayoung, Roa, Yuha, Eunwoo, Rena, Kyulkyung and Xiyeon had competed in the survival show Produce 101 and concluded the show with two members, Nayoung and Kyulkyung, debuting in the survival project girl group I.O.I. Before their debut, Pledis Girlz held concerts which the members performed weekly from May 2016 until January 2017 and also released their pre-debut single titled "WE", with the exception of Nayoung and Kyulkyung, who were still promoting with I.O.I at the time. In January 2017, Pledis Girlz concluded their weekly concerts with the announcement of the official group name Pristin, following Nayoung and Kyulkyung wrapping up their activities with I.O.I in the same months. Pristin officially debuted as a ten-member girl group in March 2017.

On May 31, 2017, UEE graduated from After School after her contract expired.

In May 2018, Lizzy graduated from After School following the expiration of her contract but remains a member of Orange Caramel. In June 2018, it was confirmed that After School member Kaeun and Huh Yunjin, a Korean-American trainee, would participate in the survival show series Produce 48. At the end of the show, it was revealed that Kaeun placed 14th overall and Yunjin placed 26th. Both failed to make it into the final lineup of the winning group, Iz*One. Yunjin was later signed to Source Music and debuted as a member of Le Sserafim in May 2022.

On May 24, 2019, Pristin was officially disbanded. Pledis announced that while Kyulkyung, Yehana, and Sungyeon would stay with the company, the remaining seven (Xiyeon, Rena, Roa, Kyla, Nayoung, Yuha, and Eunwoo) would be departing. After reuniting for the first time in almost two years, NU'EST announced their contract renewal with Pledis Entertainment. On July 6, 2019, Kaeun graduated from After School following the expiration of her contract. On December 20, 2019, Han Dong-geun parted ways with Pledis Entertainment. On December 27, 2019, Raina graduated from After School following the expiration of her contract.

By 2019, Pledis Entertainment's shares were split equally between founder Han Sung-soo and Sony Music Solutions, then known as Solasia Entertainment, with each holding 50 percent of the company.

On January 16, 2020, After School's E-Young announced that she has left Pledis Entertainment with the expiration of her contract.

=== 2020–2025: Hybe Labels, new headquarters and evolution ===
On May 25, 2020, Big Hit Entertainment, which was renamed Hybe Corporation in March 2021, announced that it had acquired shares in Pledis Entertainment and become the company's largest shareholder. The acquisition added Pledis to Big Hit's multi-label system; Big Hit said Pledis would maintain its independence after the acquisition, while its artists would be supported by Big Hit's management system. Big Hit acquired 50 percent of Pledis Entertainment's shares on May 20 and an additional 35 percent on June 9, bringing its total stake to 85 percent. On October 18, 2020, South Korea's Fair Trade Commission approved Big Hit's acquisition of Pledis.

On March 22, 2021, Pledis Entertainment, as well as the other labels part of Hybe Labels, moved to its new headquarters in the Yongsan Trade Center, the new headquarters of Hybe Corporation. On March 31, 2021, the official website of Pledis Entertainment in its Company section changed its physical address to the new building in Yongsan, Seoul. On July 19, 2021, all 13 members of Seventeen renewed their contracts with Pledis Entertainment. On August 16, 2021, it was announced that the girl group fromis 9 would be managed by Pledis Entertainment and they would be leaving Off The Record after the release of their single album 9 Way Ticket in May 2021 as the agency would be taking over all management of the group following their transfer to the agency. In December 5, Nana has re-signed her contract with Pledis Entertainment. This is her third contract renewal with the agency within 12 years since her debut in 2009.

In March 2022, founder Han Sung-soo stepped down as CEO of Pledis Entertainment, and Lee Da-hye, who previously served as a vice president at BigHit Music, a subsidiary of HYBE, was appointed as the new CEO.

On February 28, 2022, it was announced that NU'EST's exclusive contract with Pledis Entertainment will end on March 14, 2022. It was also announced that members Aron, JR and Ren will leave the agency at the conclusion of their contract, while Baekho and Minhyun opted to renew. With the news of their contract expiring, the NU'EST members confirmed the group's disbandment through handwritten letters to their fans, announcing their decision to go their own separate ways. On July 28, 2022, Pledis Entertainment announced that fromis 9 member Jang Gyu-ri would be leaving the group on July 31. The company explained in their statement that when the group transferred to Pledis, every member of fromis 9 signed a new exclusive artist contract with the company, however, Gyuri chose not to. After lengthy discussion about what is the best direction for each other, Gyuri chose not to sign a contract and embark on a new journey.

After Pledis became part of Hybe Labels, its artists were affected by Hybe's dispute with MBC, during which Hybe-affiliated artists did not appear on MBC's Show! Music Core and other MBC programs. In November 2023, Hybe and MBC signed a memorandum of understanding, after which Hybe artists resumed appearances on MBC programs.

On December 1, 2023, Nana has re-signed her contract with Pledis Entertainment. This is the fourth time she has renewed her exclusive contract with the agency since her debut in 2009.

On November 7, 2023, Pledis announced their plans to launch a new boy band in the first quarter of 2024. The members of the then-unnamed boy band, with their faces covered, were first introduced by Seventeen member Hoshi, during the SVT Caratland event in 2023. On December 21, 2023, the group's name, TWS, was revealed, with the agency explaining that the name is derived from the group's tagline "twenty-four-seven with us", which reflects the group's commitment to maintaining an enduring connection with their fans.

Founder Han Sung-soo spearheaded the production for TWS' debut extended play Sparkling Blue, which was released on January 22, 2024. The release of the EP was preceded by the release of the single "Oh MyMy:7s" on January 2, 2024. Aiming to establish "boyhood pop" with Sparkling Blue, the EP was led by the single "Plot Twist", which discussed the "thrill of a first encounter".

On November 1, 2024, Pledis Entertainment announced that vice president Kim Yeon Soo had been promoted to CEO. Kim joined Pledis Entertainment in 2012, was involved in Seventeen's debut, and in 2023 was appointed head of Hybe Labels Japan, now known as YX Labels. He continued to oversee both agencies. On November 29, Pledis announced that Fromis 9 would be parting ways with the agency following the expiration of the members' contracts on December 31, 2024.

On March 14, 2025, Baekho left Pledis Entertainment following the expiration of his exclusive contract, ending his 13-year association with the company.

On August 25, 2025, Pledis Entertainment introduced a new logo and branding under the slogan "Performance becomes the Pulse". The logo contrasts the slanted and wavy lettering of "Ple" with the upright and straight lettering of "dis". Pledis said that the design represented its "distinctive motions and rhythms" and its capacity to foster diverse artists and create unique content. The logo's reddish-orange colour was intended to symbolize the company's passion.

=== 2026–present: Corporate restructuring ===
In a filing on February 27, 2026, Pledis Entertainment stated a split to be carried out on March 4 to create Pledis Music Services Co., Ltd. (later named ABD before registration) transferring all assets and operations of the relevant division while retaining full ownership of the new company's shares. Both companies remained unlisted and share responsibility for pre-split obligations.

On May 8, 2026, it was revealed that Hybe would debut a new girl group in the second half of the year under a new label called "ABD (A Bold Dream)". The label was later revealed to a subsidiary of Pledis in a filing for the former company's quarterly report., with the label owning 85% of ABD, while the other 15% is owned by Han Sung-soo. Noh Ji-won, formerly head of artist planning at Pledis, was appointed CEO of ABD, while Han was named executive producer of its first girl group. In July, ABD unveiled the seven-member group Tuide, which officially debuted on August 24 with the EP Tune & Play.

On July 13, 2026, Pledis announced that all 13 members of Seventeen had agreed to renew their contracts with the company for a second time, following their first renewal in 2021. The renewal process had been completed for all members except those performing mandatory military service, who would complete it sequentially in accordance with their respective service conditions.

== Philanthropy ==
Beginning in 2010, Pledis released charity albums under the Happy Pledis name featuring artists from the company. Part of the proceeds from the first album, performed by After School, was designated for Save the Children. The second album was released in December 2011, with Pledis stating that it would make a donation to UNICEF. Later that month, After School, the Pledis Boys and fans delivered coal briquettes to low-income households in Guryong Village, Seoul.

On December 18, 2017, Pledis Entertainment artists NU'EST W, Seventeen, Han Dong-geun and Bumzu participated in a volunteer project delivering coal briquettes to seven households in a low-income neighborhood in Bucheon. The artists personally carried and stacked the briquettes, which were used by residents for winter heating.

In February 2020, Pledis donated to the Community Chest of Korea after the spread of COVID-19 disrupted free-meal services for elderly people living alone and other disadvantaged groups.

In November 2025, Pledis and five other labels under Hybe Music Group APAC jointly donated ₩500 million (US$373,057.49) through the Hope Bridge Korea Disaster Relief Association following an apartment fire in Hong Kong. The donation was allocated to support the bereaved families through a Hong Kong nonprofit organization.

== Current artists ==
=== Recording artists ===
Groups

- Seventeen
- TWS

Soloists

- Hwang Min-hyun

Producers

- Bumzu

Actors

- Hwang Min-hyun

== Former artists ==
- After School (2009–2015)
  - Soyoung (2009)
  - Bekah (2009–2011)
  - Jooyeon (2009–2014)
  - Kahi (2009–2015)
  - Jungah (2009–2016)
  - Uee (2009–2017)
  - Lizzy (2010–2018)
  - Kaeun (2012–2019)
  - Raina (2009–2019)
  - E-Young (2011–2020)
  - Nana (2009–2024)
- Hello Venus (2012–2014, joint ventures with Fantagio 'Tricell Media')
  - Ara (2011–2014)
  - Yoonjo (2012–2014)
- Son Dam-bi (2007–2015)
- NU'EST (2012–2022)
  - NU'EST-M (2013–2014)
    - Jason (2013–2014)
  - NU'EST W (2017–2018)
    - JR (2012–2022)
    - Aron (2012–2022)
    - Ren (2012–2022)
    - Baekho (2012–2025)
- Pristin (2016–2019)
  - Pristin V (2018–2019)
    - Nayoung (2016–2019)
    - Roa (2016–2019)
    - Eunwoo (2016–2019)
    - Rena (2016–2019)
    - Kyulkyung (2016–2019)
  - Yuha (2016–2019)
  - Xiyeon (2016–2019)
  - Kyla (2016–2019)
  - Yehana (2016–2024)
  - Sungyeon (2016–2024)
- Han Dong-geun (2013–2019)
- Fromis 9 (2021–2024)
  - Jang Gyu-ri (2021–2022)
  - Baek Ji-heon (2021–2024)
  - Park Ji-won (2021–2024)
  - Lee Chae-young (2021–2024)
  - Lee Na-gyung (2021–2024)
  - Lee Sae-rom (2021–2024)
  - Lee Seo-yeon (2021–2024)
  - Roh Ji-sun (2021–2024)
  - Song Ha-young (2021–2024)

== Discography ==
Happy Pledis discography

- Happy Pledis 1st Album – "Love Love Love" (2010)
- Happy Pledis 2nd Album – "Love Letter" (2011)
- Happy Pledis Digital Single – "Dashing Through The Snow with High Heels" (2012)

== Awards ==
List of awards and nominations
Award ceremony	Year	Category	Nominee(s)	Result	Ref.
Melon Music Awards	2023	Best Producer	Han Sung-soo	Won	
