= Kahi =

South Korean singer (born 1980)

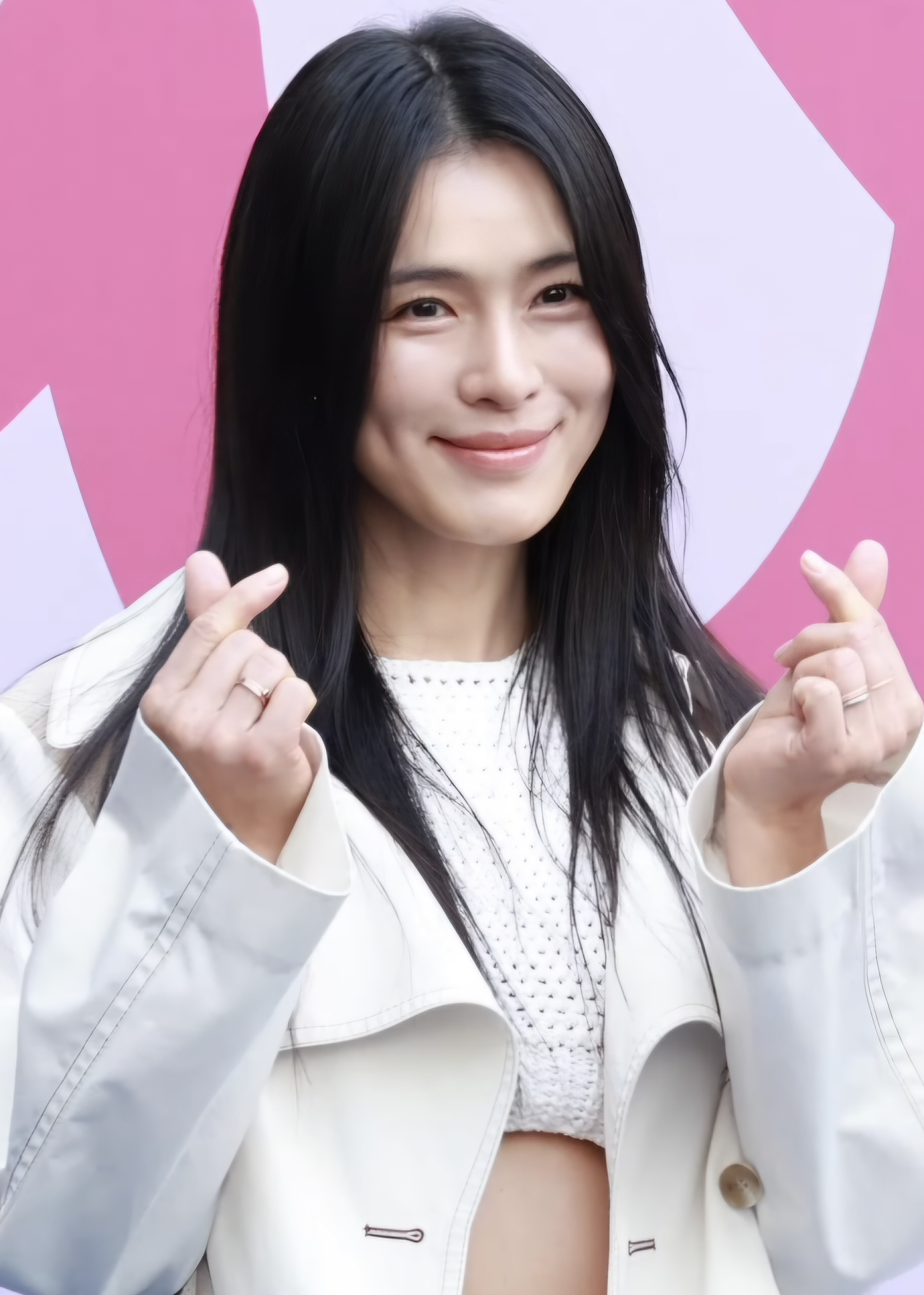
- Kahi in February 2024
- Born: Park Ji-young; December 25, 1980 (age 45); Daegu, South Korea
- Occupations: Singer; dancer; actress; songwriter
- Spouse: Yang Joon-mu (m. 2016)
- Children: 2
- Musical career
- Genre: K-pop
- Years active: 2000–present
- Label: Pledis
- Formerly of: After School; M.M.D
- Website: Official Profile Page

Korean name
- Hangul: 박지영
- Hanja: 朴祉映
- RR: Bak Jiyeong
- MR: Pak Chiyŏng

Stage name
- Hangul: 가희
- Hanja: 嘉熙
- RR: Gahui
- MR: Kahŭi

Park Ji-young (Korean: 박지영; born December 25, 1980), known professionally as Kahi, is a South Korean singer, dancer, and actress known for her work as a former leader of South Korean girl group After School. As of June 2012, Kahi graduated from After School and continued her career as a solo singer and actress with Pledis before her contract ended in January 2015.

== Early life ==
Kahi was born in Daegu on December 25, 1980. She was raised by her grandparents. She found her passion for dancing when she was 16 and also around this time became fascinated by the hip hop group Roo'ra, which would motivate her to become a singer. However, due to family opposition and practical conditions, she could not receive professional training, so during high school, she trained herself in singing and dancing. Her father prevailed upon her to go to a university in a rural area. At first, she obeyed his wishes, however, she was unable to endure being a college student and eventually left her hometown to pursue a dancing career. She did not speak with her father for the next seven years. She went to Seoul alone and without funds. One day a friend took her to an interview to be a backup dancer. She did well at the audition and got the job. She started her dancing career at age 18.

== Career ==
=== 2000–2007: Dancing and S.Blush ===
In 2000, Kahi was chosen as the main dancer for DJ Doc's mega-hit, "Run to You". However, this instant success also brought her huge stress and eventually forced her to leave for a period of time. To make an income, she worked as a cleaner, waitress, and sales clerk. A choreographer in SM Entertainment gave her a chance to become a temporary dancer for BoA, which became a full-time position. She gradually gained fame as a dancer and her work with BoA lasted more than three years. Besides BoA, she was also an important backup dancer for Country Kko Kko, Jinusean, 1TYM, Lexy, Chae Yeon, Eun Ji Won, and many others. She was also the dance teacher for Son Dam Bi, May Doni, and Kim Jung Ah, her future bandmate.

Around 2006, after more than five years career as a professional dancer, she began working also as a singer. She joined the Korean American girl group "S. Blush", whose first digital single peaked at No. 2 on the Billboard Hot Dance Chart in May 2007. However, due to various reasons, the band soon disbanded.

=== 2007–2012: Debut with After School ===
In late 2007, Kahi contacted some friends in the industry at Pledis Entertainment. Together, they planned for and produced a new group. In January 2009, after years of work and selection of members, the group After School was introduced. After School would undergo many member changes and image changes, but Kahi remained as the leader. Rumours of her leaving the group had begun as early as 2010 when Pledis Entertainment initially announced she would release a solo album. In 2010, Kahi joined the cast of reality-variety series Yeongunghogeol (영웅호걸, "Heroes").

The promotional campaign for Kahi's solo debut started in mid-February 2011, with the album jacket photos released on February 9 and a teaser video on February 12. The album photos were noted for highlighting the singer's "S-line", while netizens and news articles commented on the contrasting "black vs. white" images and "charisma" in the teaser. The mini-album was then released on February 14, 2011. The music video for "Come Back, You Bad Person" was released on February 14, 2011, and Kahi began promotional activities on 18th. In early 2012, Kahi was cast in Dream High 2, playing a teacher at Kirin Art School.

=== 2012–present: Group departure and solo career activities ===
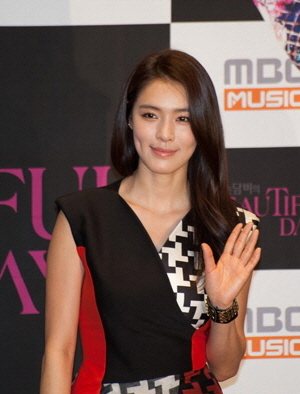
Park at Son Dam-Bi's Beautiful Days press conference in 2013

In June 2012, it was announced Kahi would be leaving After School to pursue a solo singing and acting career. In March 2013, Kahi was rumoured to be having a solo comeback, but it was put on hold. Later over a year from her last solo release, Pledis Entertainment announced on September 25, 2013, that Kahi would be releasing her second mini album, titled "Who Are You?", on October 10.

In 2014, Kahi acted as the lead role of Bonnie in the musical and Korean adaptation of Bonnie & Clyde alongside ZE:A's Hyungsik. Following After School's sixth anniversary in January 2015, Kahi announced that she was leaving Pledis Entertainment. In 2016, she was a dance trainer on the girl group survival show Produce 101. In late 2016, it was announced that she would return as a judge and dance trainer for the male version of Produce 101 titled Produce 101 Season 2. In June 2018, she also became a one-day dance trainer/judge for Produce 48.

== Personal life ==
On March 26, 2016, Kahi married entrepreneur Yang Jun-mu (CEO of Incase Korea) in a private ceremony in Hawaii. In May 2016, Kahi announced that she and her husband were expecting their first child. On October 3, Kahi gave birth to a son, Yang No-ah. Their second son, Yang Si-on, was born on June 16, 2018.

== Discography ==
Kahi discography
- Extended plays: 2
- Compilation albums: 1
- Singles: 2
- Music videos: 2
- Collaborations: 3

=== Compilation albums ===
Title	Album details	Peak chart positions	Sales
Title	Album details	JPN	Sales
Who Are You? & Come Back You Bad Person	Released: March 26, 2014; Label: Avex Trax; Format: CD, digital download; Track listing CD: 1. "Boys and Girls"; 2. "It's ME"; 3. "Hey Boy"; 4. "Sinister"; 5. "色とりどりの世界 (Colorful World)"; 6. "Slow"; 7. "Come Back You Bad Person"; 8. "One Love"; 9. "Gift"; 10. "Roller Coaster"; DVD: 1. "It's Me" (Music video); 2. "Come Back You Bad Person" (Music video)	201	JPN: 720

=== Extended plays ===
Title	Album details	Peak chart positions	Sales
Title	Album details	KOR	Sales
Come Back, You Bad Person (돌아와 나쁜 너)	Released: February 14, 2011; Label: Pledis Entertainment; Format: CD, digital download; Track listing: 1. "돌아와 나쁜 너 ( Come Back, You Bad Person)" # "One Love" # "선물 (Gift )"; 2. "롤러코스터 (Roller Coaster)"	6	KOR: 3,298
Who Are You?	Released: October 10, 2013; Label: Pledis Entertainment; Format: CD, digital download; Track listing: 1. "Boys and Girls (feat. Swings)"; 2. "It's ME (feat. Dumbfoundead)"; 3. "Hey Boy (feat. Dok2)"; 4. "Sinister ( feat. Bekah)" # "색색의 세계 (Colorful World ) (feat. Yoon Do-hyun)"; 5. "Slow"	13	KOR: 2,824

=== Singles ===
Title	Year	Peak chart positions		Album
Title	Year	KOR	KOR Hot	Album
"Come Back, You Bad Person"	2011	17	—	Come Back, You Bad Person
"It's Me" (featuring Dumbfoundead)	2013	45	51	Who Are You?
"—" denotes releases that did not chart.

=== Collaborations ===
Title	Year	Peak chart positions	Album
Title	Year	KOR Gaon	Album
"Bad Boy" (Son Dam-bi featuring Kahi)	2008	—	Mini Album Vol.1
"One Love" (Suki featuring Kahi)	2010	29	First Experience
"It's Okay" (C-Luv featuring Verbal Jint & Kahi)	2013	84	Non-album single
"Runway" (Chaeyeon featuring Kahi)	2015	—	Non-album single
"—" denotes releases that did not chart.

=== Music videos ===
Year	Music video	Length
2011	"Come Back, You Bad Person"	3:11
2013	"It's Me"	3:51

=== Writing credits ===
- After School - "When I Fall" (2009)
- After School - "With U" (2010)
- Suki - "One Love" (2010)
- Son Dam-bi - "Beat Up by a Girl" (2010)
- After School - "Someone Is You" (2010)
- Kahi - "Slow" (2013)
- Kahi - "Sinister" (2013)
- Kahi - "Hey Boy"(2013)

== Filmography ==
=== Variety shows ===
Title	Notes/Ref.
Champagne	Eps. 82
Happy Together	Eps. 156
Heroes	Member
Idol Show Season 3	Guest (with After School)
Idol Show Season 5	Guest (with After School)
Infinite Challenge	Eps. 32 (with After School)
PlayGirlz School	Member (with After School)
Radio Star	with Son Dam-bi, Jungah and Nana
Secret	
Shin PD's Variety World	with After School members
Star Golden Bell	
Star King	
Strong Heart	Eps. 17, 18, 27, 28, 39, 40
Hwasin: Controller of the Heart	Episode 6 with G-Dragon, Dae-sung, Kim Kyung-ho & Noh Sa-yeon
Taxi	with After School members
Produce 101	Trainer/ Judge
Produce 101 Season 2	Trainer/ Judge
Radio Star	Episode 534 with Lee Hyori, Chae Ri-na & Narsha
Mama The Idol	tvN / Cast Member

=== TV drama ===
Year	Title	Role
2009	You're Beautiful	Guest role
2012	Dream High 2	Hyun Ji-soo
2013	Because We Haven't Broken Up Yet	Shim Jae-hee

== Musical ==
Year	Title	Role
2014.4	Bonnie And Clyde	Bonnie
2014.11	All Shook Up	Sandra
2015.9	Cinderella	Gabrielle
2015.11	Murder Ballad	Sara
2019.6	City of Angels	Alaura Kingsley

== Awards ==
Years	Awards	Category	Results	Ref.
2010	SBS Entertainment Awards	New Star Award	Won	
