= Jung Jae-eun =

Jung Jae-eun may refer to:

- Jung Jae-eun (taekwondo)
- Jung Jae-eun (actress)
