= First Love (single album) =

Single album by After School
- Released: June 13, 2013
- Recorded: 2013
- Genres: Dance; R&B
- Length: 3:38
- Labels: Pledis; LOEN
- Producer: Brave Brothers

After School Korean chronology
The Best of After School 2009–2012: Korea Ver. (2013)	First Love (2013)	Dress to Kill (2014)

Singles from First Love
- 1. "First Love" Released: June 13, 2013

First Love (Korean: 첫사랑; RR: Cheotsarang) is the sixth single album by South Korean girl group After School. The maxi-single marks the first main single release not to feature a line-up change for the group, as well as the group's last Korean release before going on an indefinite hiatus.

== Background ==
Shortly before After School's comeback with "Flashback", Pledis' Managing Director revealed the group would release their sixth maxi single in the Fall of 2012. For unknown reasons, the release was cancelled. Throughout the remainder of 2012, several of the girls hinted at their comeback, confirmed recording and rehearsals had already begun by the end of 2012.

After teasing by the group's members throughout 2013, Pledis finally confirmed the group would be coming back with their sixth maxi single, set to be released on June 13, 2013. The single made the first collaboration between After School and producer Brave Brothers since 2009 with their second single, "Because of You. Following a slew of concept images, the single's title was confirmed as "First Love", with the following days confirming the group will have a special "pole dancing" and "Las Vegas" style comeback performance, for which they trained for around 6 months to perfect.

== Commercial performance ==
Upon release, the song topped various online music charts in South Korea and remained in the top 10 of those charts for over 2 weeks. The song debuted at #12 on the Gaon Singles Chart before rising to its peak at #7 the following week. The song debuted at #8 on the Billboard K-Pop Hot 100, before rising to its peak of #7 the following week. The album debuted and peaked at #11 on the Gaon Albums Chart. "First Love" debuted at #10 on the Gaon Monthly Download Chart for the month of June.

== Music video ==
A 30-second music video teaser was revealed through Pledis Entertainment's official YouTube channel on June 10, 2013 and it gained over 200,000 views in just under 24 hours. Through the teaser, the "special performance", a concept that After School is well known for, was unveiled as the group showcased themselves pole dancing, which was critically acclaimed. A second teaser was released on June 11, 2013 featuring E-Young, who played an instrumental version of the song on guitar, bass, drums and piano. This teaser quickly drew attention, becoming the top searched for item on Daum. The full music video was unveiled on June 13, 2013 along with the release of the maxi single.

== Promotion ==
Promotions for "First Love" began on June 13, 2013, after the release of the single, by the group holding a press conference, showcase and their comeback stage on Mnet's M! Countdown. The group also performed on MBC's Music Core and Show Champion and SBS's Inkigayo. It was revealed that the group will not be promoting on KBS's Music Bank due to conflicts between the broadcasting company and After School's record label, Pledis Entertainment.

On June 7, 2013, it was revealed that member Lizzy had damaged a ligament in her ankle, and will not be able join the group's promotional activities until it healed. Following a performance on Show Champion, Nana fell off the stage and suffered from severe shock and contusion to her pelvic region, which meant that she would be absent from promotions until she had fully recovered and the group therefore finished promoting "First Love" as 6 for the time being. After School did not perform on Show Champion from then on, however it is uncertain whether it is related to Nana's injury or not.

== Track listing ==
First Love track listing
No.	Title	Lyrics	Music	Length
1.	"8 Hot Girl"	MABOOS	Brave Brothers	1:06
2.	"First Love" (첫사랑; Cheotsarang)	Brave Brothers	Brave Brothers	3:38
3.	"Dressing Room"	Nam Minseol	Niclas Lundin, Anton Malmberg, Linda Sundblad, Hard Af Segerstad	3:36
4.	"Time's Up"	Iggy, Seo YoungBae, DJ R2	Blacc Hole	3:57
5.	"Love Beat"	Nam Minseol	east4a	3:41
6.	"Makeup & Tears" (화장을 하다 울었어; Hwajangeun Hada Ureosseo) (Performed by Jungah & Raina)	BUMZU	BUMZU	4:03
Total length:				20:01

== Charts ==
=== Weekly charts ===
Chart (2013)	Peak position
South Korea (Gaon)	7
South Korea (K-pop Hot 100)	7
South Korean Albums (Gaon)	11

=== Monthly charts ===
Chart (2013)	Peak position
South Korean Albums (Gaon)	13

=== Year-end charts ===
Chart (2013)	Position
South Korean Albums (Gaon)	98

== Sales ==
Region	Sales amount
South Korea	13,563

== Release history ==
Country	Date	Format	Label
South Korea	June 13, 2013	Digital download	Pledis Entertainment
South Korea	June 14, 2013	CD single	Pledis Entertainment
