= Park Sung-hoon =

South Korean actor (born 1985)

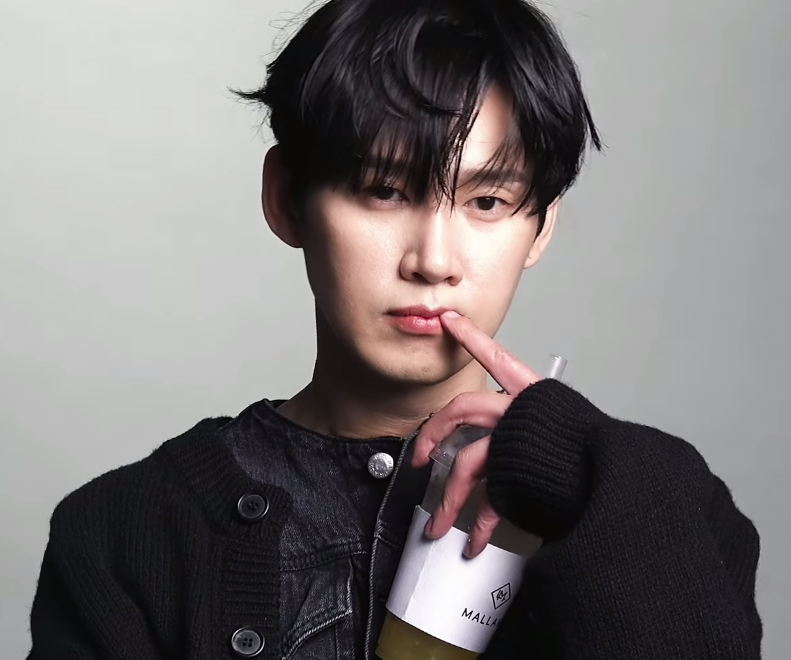
- Park in 2023
- Born: February 18, 1985 (age 41); Gwacheon, South Korea
- Education: Dong-ah Institute of Media and Arts (Department of Acting and Film)
- Occupation: Actor
- Years active: 2008–present
- Agent: BH Entertainment

Korean name
- Hangul: 박성훈
- RR: Bak Seonghun
- MR: Pak Sŏnghun
- Website: bhent.co.kr

Park Sung-hoon (Korean: 박성훈; born February 18, 1985) is a South Korean actor. He started his acting career with a small role in the film A Frozen Flower (2008). He became known through the plays Rooftop Room Cat, The History Boys, and Model Students. Park began to attract attention with supporting roles in SBS' Three Days (2014), Six Flying Dragons (2015–2016) and Don't Dare to Dream (2016). It was through the film Gonjiam: Haunted Asylum (2018) and KBS 2TV's My Only One (2018–2019) which contributed to wider audience recognition. He stepped up as a leading role in the KBS2 Wednesday-Thursday drama series Memorials.

Park is better known in recent years for his villainous roles in the dramas The Glory (2022–2023) and Queen of Tears (2024), as well as playing the transgender ex-soldier Cho Hyun-ju in season 2 (2024) and season 3 (2025) of Netflix drama Squid Game.

== Early life and education ==
Park Sung-hoon, the youngest son with two older sisters, was born on February 18, 1985, in Gwacheon, Gyeonggi Province, South Korea. He faced financial hardships during his upbringing because his father lost his job at the bank as a result of the IMF crisis. Despite attending French class of Gwacheon Foreign Language High School, he did not find much interest in studying. It was only during his third year of high school that he began contemplating his future career. This led him to enroll in Dong-ah Institute of Media and Arts, majoring in acting and film, as he had always been fond of movies.

At the age of 20, he took on his first lead role in a school class workshop, portraying Deokbae in the play titled Taxi Driver, written by director Jang Jin. He put on one performance every semester and the experience left a lasting impression on him. As he continued to participate in theater, he became more passionate about it. It was only later when he heard seniors describe the feeling of performing and receiving applause as akin to taking drugs that he realized the allure of the stage. From then on, his interest in theater only grew stronger.

== Career ==
=== 2008–2010: Career beginnings ===
After graduating, Park worked in the theater company Route 21. He was also doing odd jobs to make a living. He spent about 8–9 months in the theater company, and while he enjoyed the stage work, he found it frustrating. He had to work part-time until late at night, sleep in the theater, and couldn't secure a role due to teachers and senior actors receiving priority. He also only earned 50,000 won in total for those 9 months.

Following his departure from the theater company, Park secured minor roles in the films A Frozen Flower (2008) and Jeon Woo-chi: The Taoist Wizard (2009). Even after his film debut in 2008, Park endured a three-and-a-half-year period without any acting opportunities. After joining an agency, Park's opportunities remained limited. In the span of a year and a half, he only auditioned three times, which left him feeling disheartened about his career prospects. In 2009, he applied for the KBS voice actor recruitment test but failing in the final interview. To survive, he took on part-time employment at a concert hall, assuming the roles of both an announcer and a merchandise vendor; first in the musical concert "Pump Boyz," "Hedwig Show," and Yoon Do-hyun's Band Concert. Park's job at the concert hall allowed him to observe senior artists' performances. He frequently received business cards by chance, which led to many meetings. Park later met with the Shownote team leader, who connected him with people in the theater industry.

=== 2011–2017: Theater and breakthrough roles in television ===
In 2011, Park had the opportunity to act on stage even though he had little acting experience. During his performance in his first theater play, Inside the Minke Whale, the joy of acting that he had forgotten about was rekindled. The following year, he also took on minor roles in two television dramas, which as soldier in MBC historical drama Moon Embracing the Sun and as high school student KBS2 drama Big. Shortly after, Park joined the fifth season of the popular play Cats on the Roof, for which over 1,000 actors applied. Despite the fierce competition ratio of 150 to 1, Park was selected for the titular role of Lee Kyung-min. He reprised this role in the sixth season as well.

In the first six months of 2013, Park had a busy schedule. Park played the role of Lockwood in Korean premiere of Alan Bennett's play The History Boys. Subsequently, He had the task of balancing his obligations in both the MBC drama You Are the Boss! and the play Model Students. In drama You Are the Boss! he appeared as Yu Deok-hwa, the high school classmate of the main character Lee Seon-nam (played by Shim Hyung-tak). Simultaneously, he met the audience in the role of Seo Min-yeong, a model student with a shrewd paranoia, in the play Model Students. Juggling two different projects simultaneously and switching between such contrasting characters was undoubtedly challenging. Park stated that he enjoyed the process.

Following a short break, his next project was a guest appearance in John Cariani's omnibus play Almost, Maine. This performance was a special stage commemorating the 10th anniversary of the theater company Ganda. Producer Ahn Hyeok-won invited him and Park's decision to participate as a guest was influenced by his agency mates, Jin Seon-kyu and Lee Hee-joon, who were members of Ganda. In the fifth episode titled "They Fell", Park appeared as Chad opposite Yoon Na-moo as Randy, with whom he had previously worked in the play Model Students.

In 2014, Park appeared as a communications team leader in SBS drama Three Days and worked alongside senior actors in the industry. Then Park joined performance delivery service Ganda's play Judo Boy, as Min-wook, a boxer. This was one of his memorable performances was a result of developing camaraderie with his fellow actors, as they practiced together for four to five months.

In the end of that same year, Park and Jo Kang-hyeon both portrayed the character Park Jae-hyun in the play Melodrama directed by Jang Yu-jeon. Park Jae-hyun, who underwent a heart transplant after a car accident in his youth, falls deeply in love with Seo-kyung. Melodrama premiered in 2007 and received positive reviews for its artistic value and exploration of adultery, conveying a message about the true essence of love. It was performed at the Jayu Theater in Seoul Arts Center from December 31, 2014, to February 15, 2015.

In 2015, Park reprised his role in Judo Boy. He also returned to the play Model Students after a two-year break. In 2013, he had previously portrayed the role of Min-yeong. In 2015, Park, along with Kang Ki-dung, was double cast as the character of Myeong-jun, who had a false sense of inferiority hidden beneath his composed demeanor.

In autumn, Park and Jeong Dong-hwa were both cast as Oliver in a revival of the play The Pride directed by Kim Dong-yeon. The central theme of the play focused on the social struggles faced by marginalized groups, particularly sexual minorities: Philip, Oliver, Peter, and Sylvia, who lived in two different time periods—1958 and the present day. The production took place at the Daehakro Soohyun Theatre and ran from August 6 onwards. The Pride is a play by Alexi Kaye Campbell, a Greek-British playwright. It originally premiered at the Royal Court Theatre Upstairs in November 2008 and received prestigious awards such as The Critics' Circle Prize for Most Promising Playwright and the John Whiting Award for Best New Play. The production, under the direction of Jamie Lloyd, also received a Laurence Olivier Award for Outstanding Achievement in an affiliate theatre. The South Korean adaptation of the play was written by Ji Yi-seon, translated by Kim Soo-bin, and made its debut at The 5th Best Plays Festival at the Art One Theater in 2014.

In October of that same year, in historical drama Six Flying Dragons, Park played Gil-yu, the son of Gil Tae-mi (Park Hyuk-kwon) and a delinquent Confucian student in Sungkyunkwan. He won Best New Actor Award from Korean Culture Entertainment Awards for the role.

In the end of the year, Park joined Koki Mitani's play University of Laughs directed by Taeyoung Jeong, featuring actors Seo Hyun-cheol, Nam Seong-jin, Park Seong-hoon, and Lee Si-hoon. In the press call, Park mentioned that compared to his previous play, this play was even more challenging as it was a two-hander performance. Park expressed that after working on heavy projects consecutively, he wanted to do a comedy, and University of Laughs provided him with that opportunity. He also mentioned that memorizing the repeated and similar but different lines in the performance was the most difficult part. It was staged at Daehakro Arts Plaza Hall 1 until January 24 of the following year.

Park appeared in several productions, including the popular play The History Boys, Model Students, Judo Boys, and Melodrama. He also fearlessly embraced roles pertaining to homosexuality in productions like The Pride and Two Weddings and a Funeral. His dedication to immersing himself in any role he took on earned him acclaim as an actor. As a result, he earned the nickname "theater idol" and developed a following among theater audiences. However, despite his popularity within the Daehangno theater community, he had yet to attain widespread recognition from the general public.

In 2016, Park made a comeback to the play Almost, Maine at the Sangmyung Art Hall in Jongno District, Seoul, after three years. The performance took place from January 8 to April 10. In this performance, appeared in three different roles in three episodes, including "Where It Went," which depicts realistic love between two men and women. He said, "I met Director Min Joon-ho of the theater group Ganda and realized that I had been trying to act too easily. As Director Min is also an actor by profession, I received a lot of help in terms of 'eye-level explanations.'"

In July that same year, Park signed an exclusive contract with BH Entertainment. In the end 2016, he became scene stealer with his role as Secretary Cha in SBS drama Don't Dare to Dream.

In 2017, Park reprised his role as Oliver in the play The Pride directed by Kim Dong-yeon. The performance ran from March 21 to July 2, 2017, at the Daehakro Art One Theater Hall 2. Additionally, Park took on the role of reporter Na Sung-shik from the Splash Team in the drama Distorted. He also made a special appearance in Mad Dog as the insurance fraudster Go Jin-cheol. Furthermore, Park portrayed the supporting role of Park Gon in Black Knight: The Man Who Guards Me.

=== 2018–2021: Leading roles onscreen ===
In 2018, Park Sung-hoon made an appearance as lead role named Sung-hoon in Jeong Beom-sik's horror film Gonjiam: Haunted Asylum. The film was a box office success, drawing 2.6 million viewers. As a result, Park's recognition among audiences saw a significant increase.

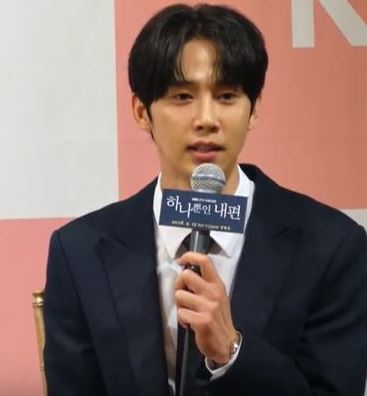
Park in September 2018

In the same year, Park starred in the KBS2 weekend drama My Only One, which ended with a wiewership rating of around 49%. His portrayal of dentist Jang Go-rae received positive audience response, earning him the endearing title of 'the nation's son-in-law'. At the end of that year, he was honored with the Best New Actor Award at the 2018 KBS Drama Awards. In 2019, Park also received a nomination in the Best New Actor category 55th Baeksang Arts Awards.

In 2019, Park donated his talent as a narrator for a barrier-free version of Song Won-geun's documentary film Kim Bok-dong. The documentary was about the story of Kim Bok-dong, a comfort woman who traveled around the world demanding an apology from Japan and had fought until the end despite being over 90 years old. She had done this from 1992 until her death in January 2019. The film was released in Korea in August and had garnered significant attention from the public.

In the same year, Park starred in two dramas. Justice as Tak Soo-ho (33 years old), Jung Jin Group's Vice Chairman. It is based on the web novel Justice, written by Jang Ho and illustrated by Elja. The series aired on KBS2's Wednesdays and Thursdays at 22:00 (KST) from July 17 to September 5, 2019. In Psychopath Diary, Park acted as Seo In-woo, the real psychopathic serial killer who is also the director of Daehan Securities where Yook Dong-sik (Yoon Shi-yoon) works. It aired on tvN from November 20, 2019 to January 9, 2020.

Park also appeared in a Korean historical drama film Forbidden Dream released on December 26, 2019. The film was directed by Hur Jin-ho and written by Jung Bum-shik and Lee Ji-min, with the screenplay written by Choi Gun-ho. Based on a true story, the film delves into the life of Sejong the Great (Han Suk-kyu), the king of the Joseon dynasty in Korea, and his relationship with his most brilliant scientist, Jang Yeong-sil (Choi Min-sik). In the film, Park acted in a supporting role Crown Prince Yi Hyang. The film made its international debut at the 2020 New York Asian Film Festival in August of that year.

In 2020, Park landed his first leading role in the KBS2 Wednesday-Thursday drama series Memorials. It is based on the screenplay written by Moon Hyun-kyung, which won the grand prize in Broadcasting Content Promotion Foundation (BCPF)'s "10th Find the Desert's Shooting Star Screenplay Competition," held in 2018. Park reunited with Nana and acted as love interest of her character. The series also starred Yoo Da-in, Han Joon-woo and Ahn Nae-sang, aired on KBS2 every Wednesday and Thursday at 21:30 (KST) from July 1 to August 20, 2020. Park's portrayal of Seo Gong-myung in the show was noted for his on-screen chemistry with Nana, leading to them being referred to as the 'La Cong Couple.' Additionally, Park showcased his singing abilities by releasing his first soundtrack, "Our Memories in Summer" (우리의 여름처럼), which featured Nana as well. Their on-screen chemistry led to them winning the Best Couple award at the 2020 KBS Drama Awards. Additionally, Park himself received the Excellence Award for Actor in a Miniseries at the same event.

In 2021, Park took on the lead role of Grand Prince Yangnyeong in the SBS Monday-Tuesday drama Joseon Exorcist, which premiered on March 22, 2021. Regrettably, the drama faced an abrupt termination after only two episodes due to significant historical distortions during its broadcast. The controversy led Park to issue a public apology on Instagram. Park posted a handwritten apology on his personal Instagram account on March 27. Subsequently, he took a hiatus from series but continued his work by participating in two KBS Drama Special, "My Daughter" and "The Distributors." Park's performance in "My Daughter" earned him the TV Cinema category award at the 2021 KBS Drama Awards. Furthermore, he was nominated for the same category at the 2022 KBS Drama Awards for his role in "The Distributors." Notably, "The Distributors" marked a reunion for Park with director Hong Seok-gu, who had previously collaborated with him on KBS weekend drama My Only One.

=== 2022–present: Wider recognition, recent screen works and theater comeback ===
In 2022, Park took on the supporting role of Jeon Jae-joon in the highly anticipated Netflix original series called The Glory. The series, written by Kim Eun-sook and directed by Ahn Gil-ho, was a revenge psychological thriller. Park starred alongside Song Hye-kyo, Lee Do-hyun, Lim Ji-yeon, Yeom Hye-ran, and Jung Sung-il. Park's character, Jeon Jae-joon, was a color-blind heir of a country club and was involved in the mistreatment of Dong-Eun (Song Hye-kyo). The series was released in two parts, with Part 1 premiering on December 30, 2022, and Part 2 on March 10, 2023. The series received critical acclaim and achieved high viewership. It was nominated for eight awards at the 59th Baeksang Arts Awards, winning three, including Best Drama, Best Actress for Song Hye-kyo, and Best Supporting Actress for Lim Ji-yeon. Park was nominated for the Best Supporting Actor Award. He also earned a nomination for the Best Supporting Actor Award at the 2nd Blue Dragon Series Awards.

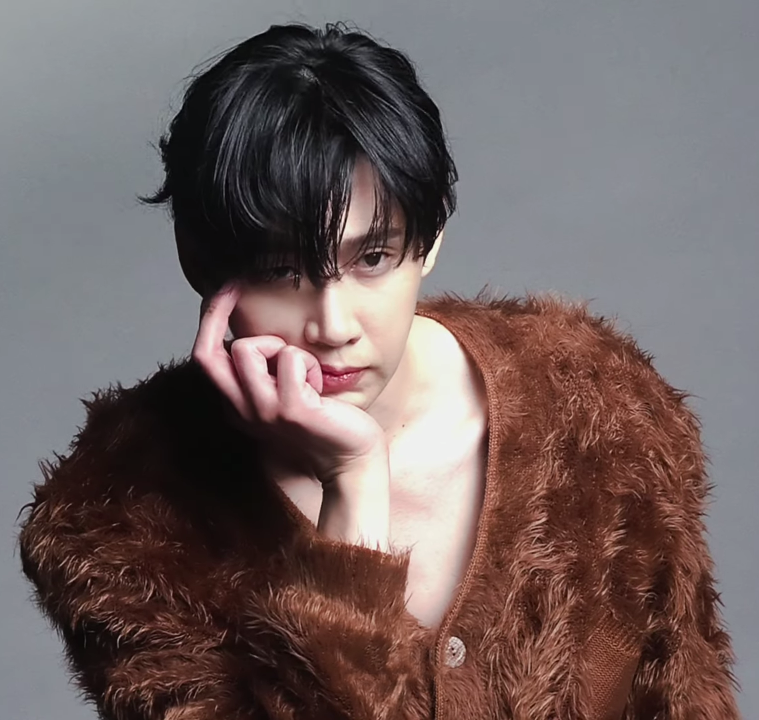
Park in 2023

The cast for Season 2 of Netflix original series Squid Game was revealed at Netflix's global fan event Tudum held in Sao Paulo, Brazil on June 17, 2023. In addition to the return of Lee Jung-jae, Lee Byung-hun, Wi Ha-joon, and Gong Yoo, who played in Season 1, Park was a new contestant alongside Yim Si-wan, Kang Ha-neul, Lee Jin-wook and Yang Dong-geun.

Park also took on role in the film Hail to Hell, which tackles the issue of digital sexual crimes. In the film, he portrayed the character Han Myeong-ho, an unscrupulous villain with a distinct contrast to Jeon Jae-jun. It premiered at the 27th Busan International Film Festival. His portrayal earned him a nomination in the Best New Actor category at the 59th Grand Bell Awards.

Meanwhile, in dramas, Park took on a non-antagonistic role. In the series Not Others, he portrayed the character Eun Jae-won, the director of Namchon Police Station. The drama is based on a webtoon of the same Korean title, which was serialized on Kakao Webtoon from 2019 to 2022. It is an original production by Genie TV, and is available for streaming on its platform, as well as on TVING in South Korea, and on Viki in selected regions. It also broadcast on ENA from July 17 to August 22, 2023 every Monday and Tuesday at 22:00 (KST). The drama is set to return for a second season, scheduled to be released in 2025. In the mystery series The Kidnapping Day, Park acted as Park Sang-yoon, a violent crime detective. The drama also starred Yoon Kye-sang, Jeon Yu-na, and Kim Shin-rok. It is based on a mystery novel of the same title by writer Jung Hae-yeon. It broadcast on ENA from September 13 to October 25, 2023, every Wednesday and Thursday at 21:00 (KST). It is also available for streaming on Amazon Prime Video in selected regions.

In January 2024, Park had made a special appearance in episodes 1-2 of the Netflix series The Bequeathed, which had been created and written by director Yeon Sang-ho. Director Min Hong-nam, who had worked as an assistant director on Train to Busan, directed the series. The series exclusively released on Netflix on January 19, 2024. In the series, Park had portrayed the character Yang Jae-seok, who was the husband of Yoon Seo-ha (played by Kim Hyun-joo). Additionally, in the same month, Park started shooting in Thailand for Kim Pan-soo's action film Tropical Night.

In March 2024, Park returned to the role of a villain in the drama Queen of Tears written by Park Ji-eun, co-directed by Jang Young-woo and Kim Hee-won, and starring Kim Soo-hyun and Kim Ji-won. He acted as Yoon Eun-sung (David Yoon), Hong Hae-in's (played by Kim Ji-won) university friend who harbors feelings for her. He is a former Wall Street analyst and M&A (mergers and acquisitions) expert who becomes a renowned investor upon his return to South Korea. Queen of Tears reached a nationwide rating of 24.850% for its final episode and became the highest-rated tvN series, surpassing Crash Landing on You. It also became the third highest-rated series in Korean cable television history for viewership ratings and the second highest by number of viewers. His performance as Yoon Eun-sung was well received by viewers. As a result, he was invited to popular television show hosted by Yoo Jae-suk and Jo Se-ho You Quiz on the Block.

Park is scheduled to go on stage for the first time in 7 years with the play Bread. Directed by Kim Tae-hyung, it will be performed at Yes24 Art One Hall 1 from June 18 to September 8. It is a work by writer Kim Eun-seong and tells the story of the main character Nana, an out-of-date drama writer, who encounters an old Type 99 rifle Bbangya while looking for material for a scenario. Park cast as Bbangya with Jeon Sung-woo, Park Jeong-won, and Hong Seung-an.

In 2024, Park starred as the transgender female character Cho Hyun-ju in the second season of Squid Game. His casting choice was controversial due to some wanting a trans person to authentically portray their experiences. Criticism fell on both the casting of a cisgender person for the role instead of a transgender person, as well as for casting a man in particular as opposed to a woman. Some argued in response to this criticism that South Korea is conservative with regards to LGBTQ rights, and that trying to find a transgender actress willing to put herself in the spotlight was not reasonable. Some commentators stated that having a trans character in a South Korean series at all is an important step in representation. Though Hwang wanted to cast a transgender actor for the role, it was difficult to find such an actor in Korea due to the above issues, and believed that Park's prior roles in The Glory and Queen of Tears made him capable of portraying the role. Of all the cast members of the second season, Park's portrayal of Hyun-ju won significant praise from many critics. Some reviews described the character as one of the most compelling characters in the second season, due to the character development and background of Hyun-ju and Park's dedication and depth in portraying Hyun-ju.

In 2026, Park starred in JTBC's romantic comedy The Practical Guide to Love opposite Han Ji-min. He played Song Tae-seop, the CEO of a woodworking studio.

== Personal life ==
In March 2017, his agency confirmed that Park and Ryu Hyun-kyung were dating. On August 5, 2022, the couple announced their breakup after 6 years of dating.

On December 30, 2024, Park faced controversy for posting a Japanese adult video cover parodying Squid Game on his Instagram story. Though there was speculation that his account was hacked, his agency confirmed that Park was responsible for sharing the photo, explaining that he had received it in a DM and meant to forward it to a company representative. In an interview on January 8, 2025, Park apologized for uploading the screenshot and expressed regret for causing this controversy. He then confirmed his agency's second statement, saying he thought the image was problematic and meant to send it to his agency for further review.

== Filmography ==
=== Film ===
Feature film appearances
Year	Title	Role	Notes	Ref.
2008	A Frozen Flower	King's guard	Bit part	
2009	Jeon Woo-chi: The Taoist Wizard	10-person Jeon Woo-chi	Bit part	
2018	Gonjiam: Haunted Asylum	Seong-hun		
2018	High Society	Jason		
2019	Kim Bok-dong	Narrator	Barrier-free version	
2019	Forbidden Dream	Lee Hyang		
2023	Hail to Hell	Han Myeong-ho		
TBA	Tropical Night	Man-su		

=== Television series ===
List of acting performances in television drama
Year	Title	Role	Notes	Ref.
2011	Bachelor's Vegetable Store	Lee Seul-woo's friend	Minor roles	
2012	Moon Embracing the Sun	Uiyoggwada	Minor roles	
2012	Big	Chungsik friend 1	Minor roles	
2013	You Are the Boss!	Yoo Deok-hwa		
2014	Three Days	Lee Dong-sung		
2015	Six Flying Dragons	Gil Yoo		
2016	Don't Dare to Dream	Secretary Cha		
2017	Distorted	Na Sung-shik		
2017	Black Knight: The Man Who Guards Me	Park Gon		
2017	Mad Dog	Ko Jin-chul	Special appearance	
2018	Rich Man	Cha Do-jin		
2018	KBS Drama Special: "Review Notebook of My Embarrassing Days"	Na Pil-seung		
2018	My Only One	Jang Go-rae		
2019	Justice	Tak Soo-ho		
2019	Psychopath Diary	Seo In-woo		
2020	Memorials	Seo Gong-myung		
2021	Joseon Exorcist	Prince Yangnyeong	2 episodes (Note: Canceled complete broadcast of show due to history distortion and Chinese style props. The show faced a massive amount of criticism leading to sponsorships and advertisements pulling out.)	
2021	Dramaworld 2	Secret Garden Parody	Cameo	
2021	KBS Drama Special: "My Daughter"	Ko Tae-hoon	One-act drama	
2022	KBS Drama Special: "The Distributors"	Do Yu-bin	One-act drama	
2022–2023	The Glory	Jeon Jae-joon	Part 1–2	
2023	Not Others	Eun Jae-won		
2023	The Kidnapping Day	Park Sang-yoon		
2024	The Bequeathed	Yang Jae-seok	Special appearance	
2024	Queen of Tears	Yoon Eun-sung / David Yoon		
2024–2025	Squid Game	Cho Hyun-ju (Player 120)	Season 2–3	
2026	Efficient Dating for Singles	Song Tae-seop		

== Stage ==
=== Musical ===
List of acting performances in musical
Year	Title		Role	Theater	Date	Ref.
Year	English	Korean	Role	Theater	Date	Ref.
2014	Marronnier Summer Festival — Can We Perform Tomorrow Too?	2014 마로니에여름축제 — 내일도 공연할 수 있을까?	Guide	Marronnier Park	August 7–10, 2014	
2015	Musical Talk Concert; Who Am I 27	뮤지컬토크콘서트; Who Am I 27	Himself	Olympus Hall	November 30, 2015	

=== Theater ===
List of acting performances in theaterList of acting performances in theater
Year	Title		Role	Theater	Date	Ref.
Year	English	Korean	Role	Theater	Date	Ref.
2011	Inside the Minke Whale	밍크고래는 소화불량이다	Motley Chan	Daehangno SM Art Hall	June 22–30	
2011–2012	Cats on the Roof	옥탑방 고양이	Lee Kyung-min	Sindorim Prime Art Hall	July 8–Jan 29	
2011–2012	Paradiso Story	파라디소 이야기	Seong-hoon	Paradiso Theater	June 24–30	
2012	Cats on the Roof	옥탑방 고양이	Lee Kyung-min	Songjuk Theater	March 14–April 15	
2012	Cats on the Roof	옥탑방 고양이	Lee Kyung-min	CT stage of the Daegu Culture and Arts Theater	March 24–27	
2012	Cats on the Roof	옥탑방 고양이	Lee Kyung-min	Daejeon Catholic Cultural Center Art Hall	October 9–November 4	
2012	Cats on the Roof	옥탑방 고양이	Lee Kyung-min	Cheongju Theater J	November 7–December 2	
2012–2013	Cats on the Roof	옥탑방 고양이	Lee Kyung-min	Gangnam Dongyang Art Hall	March 2–February 3	
2013	The History Boys	히스토리 보이즈	Lockwood	Doosan Art Center Yonkang Hall	March 8–31	
2013	Model Students	모범생들	Min-yeong	Daehakno Free Theatre	May 31 – September 29	
2013–2014	Almost, Maine	올모스트 메인	Chad	Art Plaza 4, Daehak-ro	November 11 – January 19	
2014	Judo Boy	유도소년	Min-wook	Art One Theater 3	April 26 – July 13	
2014	Two Weddings and a Funeral	두결한장두 번의 결혼식과 한 번의 장례식 (두결한장)	Min-soo	Yes 24 Stage 2 (Daehakro DCF Daemyung Culture Factory, Building 2, Lifeway Hall)	September 27, 2014 – November 30, 2014	
2014–2015	Melodrama	멜로드라마	Park Jae-hyun	Seoul Arts Center Free Small Theater	December 31–February 15	
2015	Judo Boy	유도소년	Min-wook	Art One Theater Hall 3	February 7–May 3	
2015	Model Students	모범생들	Myung-jun	Daehakno Free Theatre	May 8 – August 2	
2015	Judo Boy	유도소년	Min-wook	Ansan Arts Center Dalmaji Theater	May 21 to 24	
2015	The Pride	프라이드	Oliver	Yes 24 Stage 3	August 8 – November 1	
2015–2016	University of Laughs	웃음의 대학	Writer Hajime Tsubaki	JTN Art Hall 1	November 6 – January 24	
2016	Almost, Maine	올모스트 메인	Pete, Jimmy, Phil	Sangmyung Art Hall 1	January 8 to July 3	
2017	The Pride	프라이드	Oliver	Art One Theater Hall 2	March 21–July 2	
2024	Bread	빵야	Bbangya	Art Center 1, Daehakro, Jongno-gu, Seoul	June 18–September 8	

== Discography ==
=== Singles ===
Title	Year	Peak chart positions	Album	Ref.
Title	Year	Gaon	Album	Ref.
"Our Memories in Summer" (우리의 여름처럼) (with Nana)	2020	—	Memorials soundtrack	

== Awards and nominations ==
Name of the award ceremony, year presented, category, nominee of the award, and the result of the nomination
Award ceremony	Year	Category	Nominee / Work	Result	Ref.
Baeksang Arts Awards	2019	Best New Actor – Television	My Only One	Nominated	
Baeksang Arts Awards	2023	Best Supporting Actor – Television	The Glory	Nominated	
Blue Dragon Series Awards	2023	Best Supporting Actor	The Glory	Nominated	
Grand Bell Awards	2023	Best New Actor	Hail to Hell	Nominated	
KBS Drama Awards	2018	Excellence Award, Actor in a One-Act/Special/Short Drama	Review Notebook of My Embarrassing Days	Nominated	
KBS Drama Awards	2018	Best New Actor	My Only One; Black Knight: The Man Who Guards Me	Won	
KBS Drama Awards	2020	Excellence Award, Actor in a Miniseries	Memorials	Won	
KBS Drama Awards	2020	Best Couple	Park Sung-hoon (with Nana); Memorials	Won	
KBS Drama Awards	2021	Best Actor in Drama Special/TV Cinema	KBS Drama Special My Daughter	Won	
KBS Drama Awards	2022	Best Actor in Drama Special/TV Cinema	KBS Drama Special The Distributors	Nominated	
Korean Culture Entertainment Awards	2015	Best New Actor (Drama)	Six Flying Dragons	Won	
