= Seo Hyun-chul =

South Korean television and film actor

- Born: May 19, 1965 (age 61); Seosan, Chungchongnam-do, South Korea
- Other name: Seo Hyun-cheol
- Occupations: Film actor; theater actor
- Years active: 1994–present
- Agent: MUMW
- Spouse: Jung Jae-eun

Korean name
- Hangul: 서현철
- Hanja: 徐鉉哲
- RR: Seo Hyeoncheol
- MR: Sŏ Hyŏnch'ŏl

Seo Hyun-chul (Korean: 서현철, born 19 May 1965) is a South Korean theater, film and television actor. He is known for his supporting roles in several television series and films notably, the medical drama Good Doctor (2013), the film Mission: Possible (2021), and the action-comedy series Good Boy (2025).

== Career ==
Seo debuted in 1994 ln play Hwang Gu-do. Since then he has appeared in about 110 stage and musical plays. He made his TV debut in 2010 series Cinderella's Stepsister, whereas his film debut was in the film Finding Mr. Destiny in the same year.

Seo appeared on talk show Radio Star thrice in year 2015, 2017 and 2019 in episodes 426, 513 and 648 respectively. In 2021 he appeared in tvN's apocalyptic thriller Happiness along with his wife Jung Jae-eun. In 2022 Seo was cast in JTBC TV series Thirty-Nine as father of one of the main leads.

== Personal life ==
Seo married actress Jung Jae-eun after 2 years of dating at the age of 45.

== Filmography ==
=== Films ===
Year	Title	Role	Notes	Ref.
2010	Finding Mr. Destiny	Customer 2		
2013	The Gifted Hands	Chief detective Go		
2017	The Bros	Eldest grandson	Cameo	
2019	Black Money	Im Seung-man		
2021	Mission: Possible	Detective squad chief		
2024	Pilot	Fellow captain	Cameo	

=== Television series ===
Year	Title	Role	Notes	Ref.
2010	Cinderella's Stepsister	Kang-sook's true love		
2010	KBS Drama Special: "Spy Trader Kim Chul-soo's Recent Condition"	Park	Season 1, episode 10	
2010	The King of Legend	Yeom-bo		
2011	KBS Drama Special: "Perfect Spy"	Chief	Season 1, Episode 6	
2011	Our Women	Choi Doo-ho		
2011	KBS Drama Special: "Identical Criminals"	Choi Kyeong-rok	Season 2, episode 11	
2012	Moon Embracing the Sun	Lord Shim San		
2012	The Secret of Birth	Go Eun-pyo		b
2013	Good Doctor	Byung-soo		
2013	Golden Rainbow	Kang Dong-pal		
2014	KBS Drama Special: "First Birthday"	Seong-gi	Season 5, episode 2	
2014	Wonderful Days	Han Bin / Hwang Gil-sang		
2014	Diary of a Night Watchman	Min Joong-seo		
2015	The Jingbirok: A Memoir of Imjin War	Yi Il		
2015	KBS Drama Special: "The Wind Blows to the Hope"	Moon Jong-dae	Season 6, episode 2	
2015	Assembly	Seo Dong-jae		
2015	Six Flying Dragons	Jang Sam-bong		
2015	Sweet, Savage Family	Seo Chul-joong		
2016	Jang Yeong-sil	Choi Bok		
2016	One More Happy Ending	Ward official		
2016	Wanted	Kim Sang-sik		
2016	The Good Wife	Son Byung-ho		
2016	Cinderella with Four Knights	Eun Gi-sang		
2016	The Sound of Your Heart	Vice Head of Division 5		
2016	My Fair Lady	Kong Gil-ho		
2017	Circle	Detective Hong Jin-hong father		
2017	Manhole	Soo-jin's father		
2017	Revolutionary Love	Kim Ki-sub		
2018	A Poem a Day	Yang Myung-cheol		
2018	Sunny Again Tomorrow	Lee Sang-hoon		
2019	KBS Drama Special: "Home Sweet Home"	Jo Hyeon-seok	Season 10, episode 1	
2019	Melting Me Softly	Hwang Gab-soo		
2019	Woman of 9.9 Billion	Oh Dae-yong		
2020	Men Are Men	Seo Ho-joon		
2021	Happiness	Yi-hyun's father		
2022	Forecasting Love and Weather	Chae Yoo-jin's father	Special appearance	
2022	Thirty-Nine	Jeong Chan-young's father		
2022–2023	The First Responders	Baek Cham	Season 1–2	
2023	My Lovely Liar	Jang Joong-gyu		
2023	Welcome to Samdal-ri	Jo Pan-sik		
2024	A Virtuous Business			
2025	Good Boy	Hwang Gyeong-cheol		
2026	Undercover Miss Hong	So Kyung-dong		

=== Web series ===
Year	Title	Role	Notes	Ref.
2023	Boyhood	Jang Hak-su		

=== Television show ===
Year	Title	Role	Notes	Ref.
2023	Listen, See, It's Okay	Cast Member	Television, drama, sound	

== Theater ==
Year	Title	Role	Notes/Ref.
2004	Theatrical Enthusiasm - Turn off the lights, please		
2004	Theatrical Enthusiasm - Fantastic	Henry	
2005	Stone in the Pocket	Theater actor	
2006	Nasaengmun	Hairdresser	
2006	Fantastic	Henry	
2007	Country boy scat	Henry	
2007	Noise Off	Roger	
2008	Radio Star	Bureau chief	
2009	Samdobong Beauty Story	Noh Noh Sul	
2009	Story of a Thief	Less old thief	
2015	University of Laughter	Censor	
2021	Special Liar	Stanley Gardner	
2021	Frankenstein	Stephan	
2022–2023	Old Weekly Song	Josef Mashkan	
