= Sublime (agency) =

South Korean talent management agency

SUBLIME
- Native name: 써브라임
- Type: Private
- Industry: Music; entertainment; Management
- Founded: April 17, 2015; 11 years ago
- Headquarters: 3F, 3, Eonju-ro 146-gil, Gangnam-gu, Seoul, South Korea
- Key people: Ra Kang-yoon (CEO)
- Services: Music production; Artists management
- Subsidiaries: Studio Bone B1
- Website: www.sublimeartist.co.kr

Sublime (Korean: 써브라임; stylised as SUBLIME), formerly known as Sublime Artist Agency, is a South Korean entertainment and management company founded on April 17, 2015. Based in Seoul, it manages actors, solo musicians, and K-pop idols.

== History ==
On April 17, 2015, Sublime was established under the name 'Sublime Artist Agency'. The entertainment and talent management company later shortened its corporate brand name to SUBLIME in February 2022 after receiving investments from Netmarble F&C and JTBC Studio.

== Partnerships ==
=== Current ===
- Team Wang (2021–present)
  - Jackson Wang (2021–present)
- ATOC (MOU; 2023–present)

=== Former ===
- Rain Company (MOU; 2020–2023)

== Current artists ==
=== Entertainers ===
- Kim Yoon-ji (NS Yoon-G) (2021–present)
- Jackson Wang (2021–present)
- Jeong Ye-in (2022–present)
- Nancy (2023–present; with ATOC)

=== Actors ===
- Jung Taek-woon (2026–present)
- Kim Doh-yon (?–present)

=== Actresses ===
- Ki Eun-se (?–present)
- Nana (2024–present)
- Ahn Hee-yeon (2019–present)
- Lee Hye-ri (2024–present)
- Im Soo-hyang (2025–present)

=== Photographers ===
- JDZ CHUNG
- Geeeembo
- SOPIA.K
- Choigo
- Inki Kang
- STRTSPHR
- Rapbong
- LEE JAE DON
- Gownn
- HUGO LEE

== Former artists ==
- Song Yu-jung (2013–2021)
- Suh Ji-hye (2017–?)
- Leah (2017–?)
- Lee Seo-bin (2017–?)
- Minami Riho (2017–?)
- Seohyun (2017–2018)
- Hyomin (2018–2021)
- Shin Su-hyun (2018–2025)
- Kim Hee-jung (2019–?)
- Yoon Seo-bin (2019–2022)
- Lim Na-young (2019–2023)
- Kang Da-eun
- Kim Yae-lim
- Jung Bo-min
- Jamie
- Rain (2020–2023; management only)
- Song Kang-ho (2020–2025)
- Yerin (2021–2023)
- Choi Young-jae (2021–2024)
- RINA (2021–?; with Metaverse Entertainment)
- Anda (2022)
- Tiffany Young (2022–2026)
- Han Hyun-min (2022–?)
- Kim Jin-kyung (2022–?)
- Song Ji-ah (2023–?)
- Jini (2023–2025; with ATOC)
- Ahn Tae-hwan
- Yoon Jung-hee
- Han Eu-ddeum
- Oh Ye-ju
- Han Jae-in
- Ko So-young (2023–2026)
- Seo Yea-ji (2024–2026)
- Cho Han-gyul (2024–2026)
- Kwon Nara (2025–2026)

Models

- Park Hye-won (2015)
- Lee Chae-won (2015–2016)
- Shin Min-kyung (2015–2016)
- Vivian (2015–2018)
- Jeong Ah-reum (2016–2017)
- Kim Lim (2016–2017)
- Yoonjo (2016–2017)
- Kim Yu-jin (2017)
