= Memorials (TV series) =

2020 South Korea television series

- Promotional poster
- Also known as: Into the Ring; Pick Me
- Hangul: 출사표
- Hanja: 出師表
- Lit.: Memorial on the case to go to war
- RR: Chulsapyo
- MR: Ch'ulsap'yo
- Genre: Comedy; Romance; Political
- Created by: KBS Drama Production
- Written by: Moon Hyun-kyung
- Directed by: Hwang Seung-ki
- Starring: Nana; Park Sung-hoon; Yoo Da-in; Han Joon-woo; Ahn Nae-sang
- Country of origin: South Korea
- Original language: Korean
- No. of episodes: 16

Production
- Executive producer: Kang Byung-taek (KBS)
- Producer: Park Jae Sam
- Running time: 70 minutes
- Production companies: Frame Media; Celltrion Entertainment

Original release
- Network: KBS2
- Release: July 1 – August 20, 2020

Memorials (Korean: 출사표) is a 2020 South Korean television series starring Nana, Park Sung-hoon, Yoo Da-in, Han Joon-woo and Ahn Nae-sang. It aired on KBS2 every Wednesday and Thursday at 21:30 (KST) from July 1 to August 20, 2020.

The series is based on the screenplay by Moon Hyun-kyung which is the grand prize winner in Broadcasting Content Promotion Foundation (BCPF)'s 10th Find the Desert's Shooting Star Screenplay Competition, held in 2018.

== Synopsis ==
Koo Se Ra (Nana), who has lived all 29 years of her life in Mawon-gu, is nothing but an underqualified struggler with a poor financial background. On one hand, this over-passionate, self-proclaimed Tax Guardian never lets a single wrongdoing slip through her until it is filed and settled as a civil complaint. However, because of her nosy nature and her tendency to lose temper over unrighteousness, she gets fired from an internship, from a contract position, and even from an outsourced job, to name a few from the list of her former employers. Although not intended, she finds herself gradually turning into a professional resigner and decides that it's time for a change. This time, her passion steers toward the District Assembly, so called the employees' utopia. In fact, now that she has entered the ring, her only option is to run for the office, to get elected, and to stay elected.

== Cast ==
=== Main ===
- Nana as Koo Se-ra
  - Kim Ha-yeon as Young Koo Se-ra
- Park Sung-hoon as Seo Gong-myung
- Yoo Da-in as Yoon Hee-soo
- Han Joon-woo as Kim Min-jae
- Ahn Nae-sang as Jo Maeng-deok

=== Supporting ===
==== Se-ra's family and friends ====
- Ahn Gil-kang as Koo Young-tae, Se-ra's father
- Jang Hye-jin as Kim Sam-sook, Se-ra's mother
- Kim Mi-soo as Kwon Woo-young, Se-ra's best friend
- Shin Do-hyun as Jang Han-bi, Se-ra's best friend
- Choi Go as Kim Ja-ryong, 9 year old kid Jang Han-bi babysits

==== Mawon-gu officials ====
- Bae Hae-sun as Won So-jung
- Lee Seo-hwan as Heo Deok-gu
- Seo Jin-won as Shim Jang-yang
- Han Dong-kyu as Jang Ha-woon
- Lee Chang-jik as Shi Dan-kyu
- Yoon Joo-sang as Bong Chu-san
- Oh Dong-min as Go Dong-chan
- Yu Seong-ju as Yang Nae-sung

==== Mawon-gu public officials ====
- Park Sung-geun as Lee Dae-cheol
- Kim Hyun-mok as Jung Yong-kyu

== Original soundtrack ==
Memorials

Soundtrack album by Various Artists
- Released: 2020
- Genre: Soundtrack
- Languages: Korean; English
- Labels: Music&New, Leon Korea

=== Part 1 ===
Released on July 8, 2020
No.	Title	Lyrics	Music	Artist	Length
1.	"Good Sera"	Park Seong-jin, Shim Hyeon-bo	Park Seong-jin, Choi Min-chang	Siyeon (Dreamcatcher)	3:30
2.	"Good Sera" (Inst.)		Park Seong-jin, Choi Min-chang		3:30
Total length:					7:00

=== Part 2 ===
Released on July 15, 2020
No.	Title	Lyrics	Music	Artist	Length
1.	"New Direction"	Park Seong-jin, youra	Park Seong-jin, Choi Min-chang	youra	3:10
2.	"New Direction" (Inst.)		Park Seong-jin, Choi Min-chang		3:10
Total length:					6:20

=== Part 3 ===
Released on July 22, 2020
No.	Title	Lyrics	Music	Artist	Length
1.	"Still Living in Wonderful Day" (이대로도 좋은 하루를 살고 있어)	ZigZag Note, Lee Shin-seong	ZigZag Note, Noh Eun-jong	9 and the Numbers	3:52
2.	"Still Living in Wonderful Day" (Inst.)		ZigZag Note, Noh Eun-jong		3:52
Total length:					7:44

=== Part 4 ===
Released on July 29, 2020
No.	Title	Lyrics	Music	Artist	Length
1.	"Spring Flower" (봄꽃)	Kim Kyu-hyeon (Chansline), Choi Young-ah (Chansline)	Kim Kyu-hyeon (Chansline), Choi Young-ah (Chansline)	Chuu (Loona)	3:13
2.	"Spring Flower" (Inst.)		Kim Kyu-hyeon (Chansline), Choi Young-ah (Chansline)		3:13
Total length:					6:26

=== Part 5 ===
Released on August 5, 2020
No.	Title	Lyrics	Music	Artist	Length
1.	"Until the Day" (그날까지)	Lee Ye-rin (Chansline)	Lee Ye-rin (Chansline), Kim Seong-eun (Chansline), Seok Hye-min (Chansline)	MINSEO	4:03
2.	"Until the Day" (Inst.)		Lee Ye-rin (Chansline), Kim Seong-eun (Chansline), Seok Hye-min (Chansline)		4:03
Total length:					8:06

=== Part 6 ===
Released on August 12, 2020
No.	Title	Lyrics	Music	Artist	Length
1.	"All the Way" (내내)	Shim Hyeon-bo	Choi Min-chang	Boramiyu	4:11
2.	"All the Way" (Inst.)		Choi Min-chang		4:11
Total length:					8:22

=== Part 7 ===
Released on August 19, 2020
No.	Title	Lyrics	Music	Artist	Length
1.	"Our Memories in Summer" (우리의 여름처럼)	Shim Hyeon-bo	Park Seong-jin	Nana, Park Sung-hoon	3:26
2.	"Our Memories in Summer" (Inst.)		Park Seong-jin		3:26
Total length:					6:52

== Ratings ==
In this table, the blue numbers represent the lowest ratings and the red numbers represent the highest ratings.

Ep.	Part	Original broadcast date	Average audience share (Nielsen Korea)
1	1	July 1, 2020	3.0%
1	2	July 1, 2020	3.5%
2	1	July 2, 2020	2.8%
2	2	July 2, 2020	3.7%
3	1	July 8, 2020	2.5%
3	2	July 8, 2020	3.2%
4	1	July 9, 2020	2.4%
4	2	July 9, 2020	3.3%
5	1	July 15, 2020	2.7%
5	2	July 15, 2020	2.7%
6	1	July 16, 2020	2.5%
6	2	July 16, 2020	2.9%
7	1	July 22, 2020	2.5%
7	2	July 22, 2020	3.0%
8	1	July 23, 2020	2.5%
8	2	July 23, 2020	3.2%
9	1	July 29, 2020	2.7%
9	2	July 29, 2020	3.3%
10	1	July 30, 2020	2.3%
10	2	July 30, 2020	3.2%
11	1	August 5, 2020	2.6%
11	2	August 5, 2020	3.1%
12	1	August 6, 2020	2.0%
12	2	August 6, 2020	2.4%
13	1	August 12, 2020	2.3%
13	2	August 12, 2020	3.0%
14	1	August 13, 2020	2.4%
14	2	August 13, 2020	3.1%
15	1	August 19, 2020	2.5%
15	2	August 19, 2020	2.9%
16	1	August 20, 2020	2.6%
16	2	August 20, 2020	2.9%
Average			2.8%

== Awards and nominations ==
Year	Award	Category	Recipient	Result
2020	KBS Drama Awards	Excellence Award, Actor in a Miniseries	Park Sung-hoon	Won
2020	KBS Drama Awards	Excellence Award, Actress in a Miniseries	Nana	Won
2020	KBS Drama Awards	Best Supporting Actor	Ahn Gil-kang	Won
2020	KBS Drama Awards	Best Supporting Actress	Jang Hye-jin	Nominated
2020	KBS Drama Awards	Best Young Actor	Choi Go	Nominated
2020	KBS Drama Awards	Best New Actor	Oh Dong-min	Nominated
2020	KBS Drama Awards	Best Couple Award	Park Sung-hoon and Nana	Won
