= Lee Bom-so-ri =

South Korean actress (born 1992)

- Born: Kim Da-hye; 19 October 1992 (age 32); Seoul, South Korea
- Education: Chung-Ang University (Department of Theater)
- Occupation: Actress
- Years active: 2012–present
- Agent: Big Boss Entertainment

Korean name
- Hangul: 김다혜
- RR: Gim Dahye
- MR: Kim Tahye

Stage name
- Hangul: 이봄소리
- RR: I Bomsori
- MR: I Pomsori

Kim Da-hye (Korean: 김다혜; born 19 October 1992), better known by the stage name Lee Bom-so-ri (이봄소리), is a South Korean actress. She is known for her roles in dramas such as The Miracle We Met (2018), Justice (2019) and Link: Eat, Love, Kill (2022).

== Filmography ==
=== Television series ===
Year	Title	Role	Notes	Ref.
2016	The Doctors	So-ri		
2018	The Miracle We Met	Seo He-joo		
2019	Justice	Park Hyo-rim		
2021	Hospital Playlist	OB-GYN fellow	Season 2 (Episode 9)	
2022	Link: Eat, Love, Kill	Hwang Min-jo		
2024	The Midnight Studio	Kim Ji-won		
2024	Frankly Speaking	Lee Ha-young		

== Theatre ==
Year	Title	Korean Title	Role
2015	Infinite Power	무한동력	Sol Kim
2015	Birth Of Millet	밀당의 탄생	Princess Seon-hwa
2016	Aranga	아랑가	Arang
2016	Romeo and Juliet	로미오와 줄리엣	Juliet
2017	Special Envoy	경성특사	Lee Ok-yoon
2017	Interview	인터뷰	Joan
2018	Notre Dame de Paris	노트르담 드 파리	Fleur de Lys
2019	Letters For You	너를 위한 글자	Carolina
2020	Marie Curie	마리 퀴리	Anne Kowalski
2020	Chami	차미	Chami
2020	Something Lawton	썸씽로튼	Portia
2020	Gwangju	광주	Moon Soo-kyung
2020	Amadeus	아마데우스	Constance Bieber
2021	Excalibur	엑스칼리버	Guinevere
2021	Frankstein	프랑켄슈타인	Julia
2022	Bronte	브론테	Charlotte

== Awards and nominations ==
Name of the award ceremony, year presented, category, nominee of the award, and the result of the nomination
Award ceremony	Year	Category	Nominee / Work	Result	Ref.
Korea Musical Awards	2021	Best Supporting Actress	Chami	Won	
