= Nana (entertainer) =

South Korean singer and actress (born 1991)

- Nana in September 2026
- Born: Im Jin-ah; September 14, 1991 (age 35); Cheongju, South Korea
- Education: Seoul Institute of the Arts
- Occupations: Actress; model; singer
- Years active: 2009–present
- Agent: Sublime
- Musical career
- Genre: K-pop
- Instrument: Vocals
- Years active: 2009–2015; 2025–present
- Label: Pledis
- Member of: After School; A.S. Red; Orange Caramel

Korean name
- Hangul: 임진아
- Hanja: 林珍兒
- RR: Im Jina
- MR: Im China

Stage name
- Hangul: 나나
- Hanja: 娜娜
- RR: Nana
- MR: Nana

Im Jin-ah (Korean: 임진아; born September 14, 1991), known professionally as Nana (나나), is a South Korean singer, actress, and model. She first rose to prominence as a member of the South Korean girl group After School and its subgroups, Orange Caramel and After School Red. She gained recognition as an actress through her roles in various television dramas such as The Good Wife (2016), Kill It (2019), Glitch (2022), Mask Girl (2023) and Climax (2026).

== Early life ==
Nana was born on September 14, 1991. She graduated from Ochang High School in Cheongju and was a participant in the 2009 Asia Pacific Super Model Contest.

== Career ==
=== 2009–2013: Debut with After School and Orange Caramel ===
In November 2009, Nana debuted in After School along with Raina as third-generation members with the release of After School's second EP, Because of You. In June 2010, Nana, along with After School members Raina and Lizzy, formed a sub-unit called Orange Caramel.

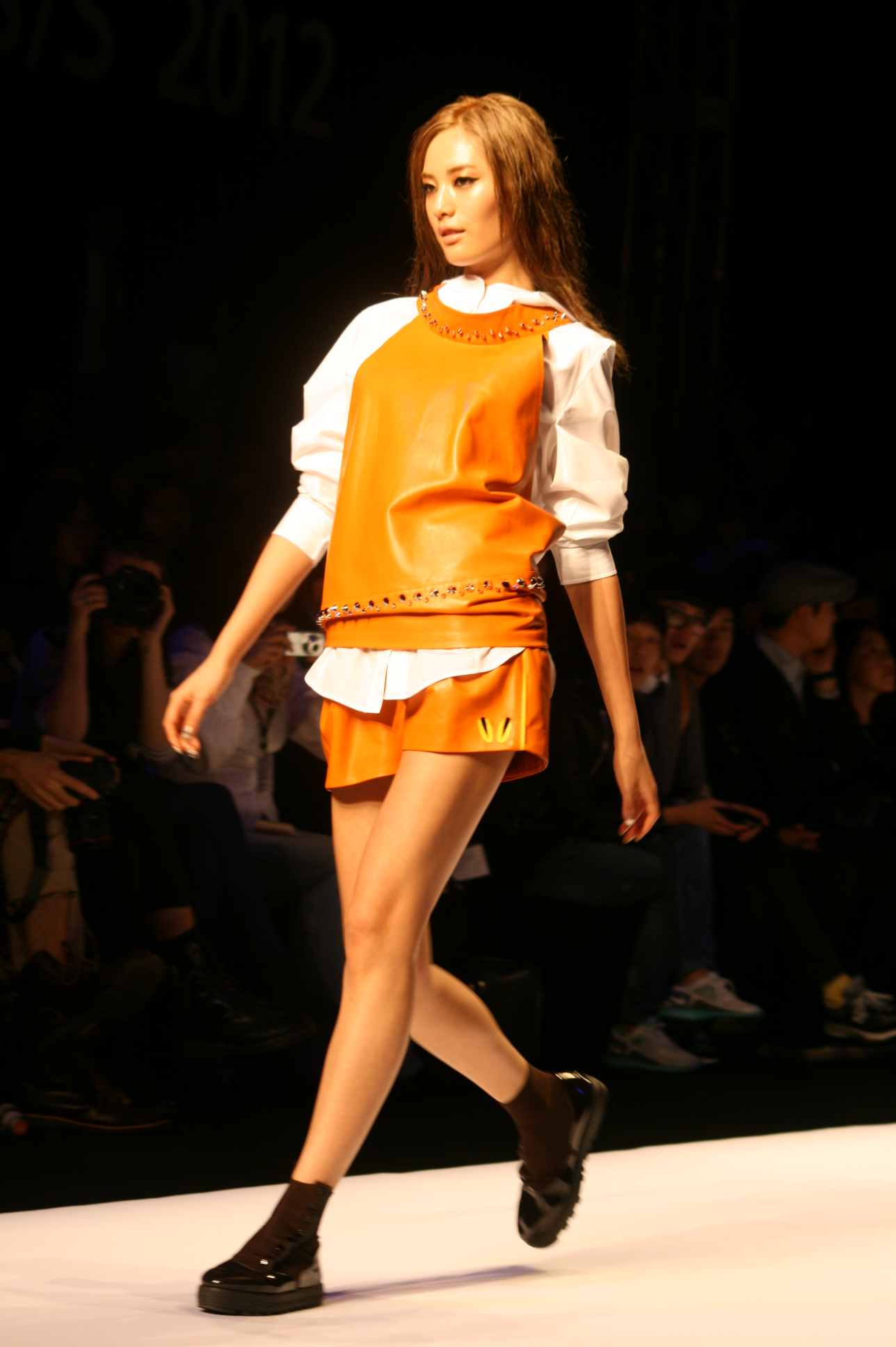
Nana at the 2011 Seoul Fashion Week

In July 2011, Nana was part of the After School sub-unit A.S. Red along with After School members Kahi, Jungah and Uee, releasing the single "In the Night Sky". In September 2011, she was chosen as the main model for the Tokyo Girls Collection fashion show.

In March 2012, Nana again modeled for the Tokyo Girls Collection, walking the S/S 2012 show. She was also a model for the Japanese fashion show Girls' Award and Park Yoon-yoo's Seoul Fashion Walk S/S 2012. In June 2012, After School released their fifth maxi-single Flashback. Nana has a solo song on it titled "Eyeline". In December, she joined fellow K-pop stars Hyolyn, Hyuna, Hyoseong, and Nicole to form the super group Dazzling Red for SBS Gayo Daejun, performing the song "This Person". She also became the endorsement model for the biggest diet brand in Korea, Juvis. Nana was also a permanent panelist on the Japanese fashion TV show Tokyo Brandnew Girls.

In 2013, she walked the runway for a-nation's "NYLON" fashion show. The same year, Nana collaborated with Electroboyz on their single "Ma Boy 3". In December 2013, Nana gained global recognition when she placed second on the Independent Critics List of 100 Most Beautiful Faces of 2013. She rose to the No. 1 position in 2014 and placed first again in 2015.

=== 2014–present: Acting career and change of label ===
In March 2014, it was announced that Nana would be a member on a new SBS's variety show called Roommate. The show featured 11 celebrities living in one house. In April, Nana became the host for the second season of OnStyle's Style Log, along with Hong Jong-hyun and Cho Min-ho. In August 2014, Nana participated in the Chinese fashion elimination show Muse Dress, and emerged runner-up in the competition. She also had a cameo role in the Korean film Fashion King, which was released on November 6, 2014.

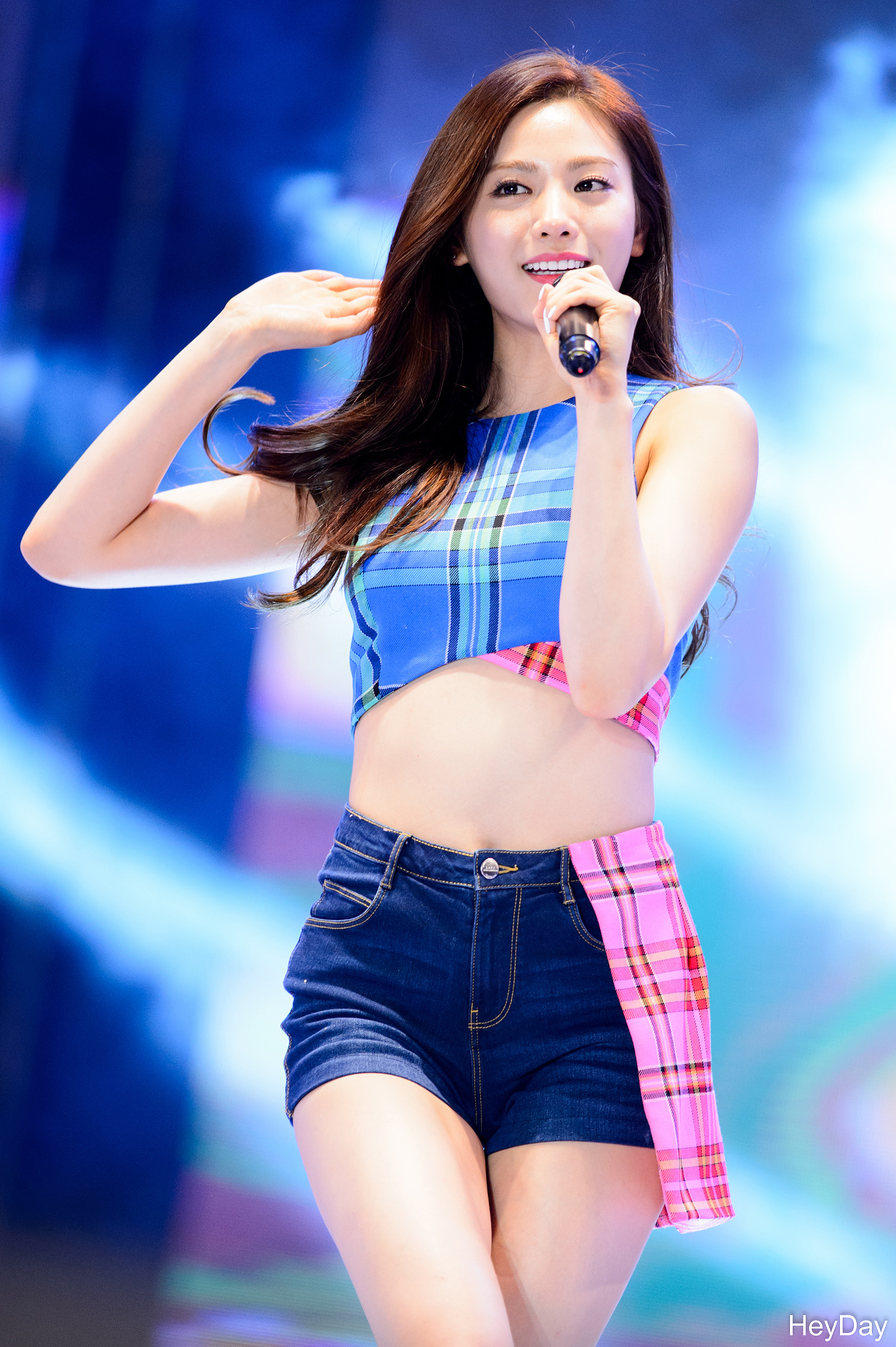
Nana performing in August 2015

In early 2015, Nana debuted as an actress, starring in the Chinese television drama Love Weaves Through a Millennium, a remake of the Korean drama Queen In-hyun's Man (2012). The same year, she starred in the Chinese romantic comedy film Go Lala Go 2, the sequel to Go Lala Go!.

In February 2016, Nana joined the cast of Real Men for the fourth season's female soldier special. Later in the year, she was cast in a supporting role in the television drama The Good Wife, a remake of the American series of the same name Nana earned positive reviews for her role as Kim Dan, and received the Rookie Actress award at the 2016 Asia Artist Awards. Following her success on the small screen, Nana was cast alongside her The Good Wife co-star, Yoo Ji-tae in the crime comedy film The Swindlers (Conman), as the only female lead. The film garnered 213,185 admissions on the first day of its release and topped the local box office for three consecutive weeks.

In 2017, she was cast in her first leading role, in the romantic thriller Four Men, but decided to leave the cast due to delays in production.

In 2019, Nana starred in OCN's crime drama Kill It, playing detective Do Hyun-jin. The same year, she starred in KBS's melodrama Justice, based on the web novel Justice, written by Jang Ho and illustrated by Elja, as prosecutor Seo Yeon-ah. Nana once again received acclaim, earning herself an Excellence Award from the 2019 KBS Drama Awards.

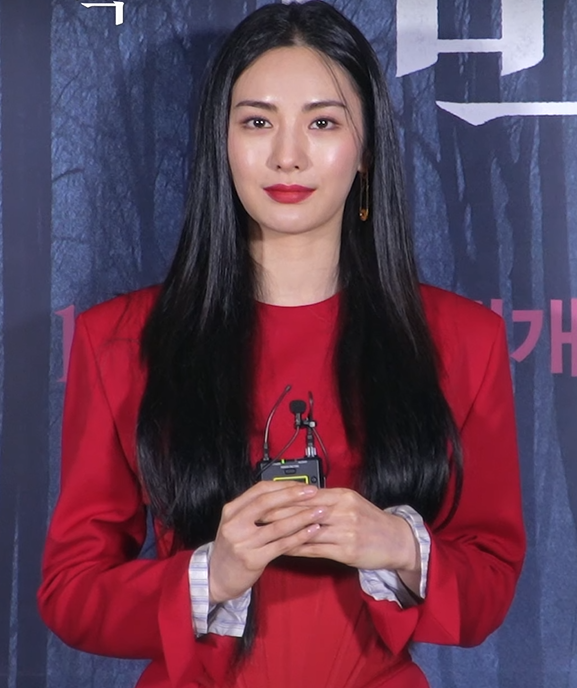
Nana in 2022

In 2020, Nana was announced to star in a mystery thriller film, Confession, based on the Spanish film Contratiempo (The Invisible Guest), alongside So Ji-sub and Yunjin Kim.

In July 2020, Nana starred with Park Sung-hoon as the lead actress for KBS's drama Memorials. The drama gathered anticipation due to the series being based on the screenplay by Moon Hyun-kyung, the grand prize winner at the Broadcasting Content Promotion Foundation (BCPF)'s 10th Find the Desert's Shooting Star Screenplay Competition, held in 2018. Nana also made her return to music after 6 years through the drama with the release of her first soundtrack, "Our Memories in Summer" (우리의 여름처럼) with co-star Park Sung-hoon. On September 7, it was confirmed that Nana would star in a new MBC drama Oh My Ladylord with Lee Min-ki set to premiere on March 24, 2021.

After the completion of Oh My Ladylord, it was announced in May 2021, that Nana was cast in Netflix's upcoming series Glitch as Heo Bora, alongside actress Jeon Yeo-been.

On December 8, 2021, Nana renewed her contract with Pledis Entertainment for the third time.

In 2023, she received widespread acclaim for her remarkable portrayal of Kim Mo-mi in the Netflix series Mask Girl, taking on a groundbreaking dual-role performance.

In September 2024, Nana left Pledis Entertainment after 15 years, and signed with new agency Sublime.

== Personal life ==
=== Home invasion incident ===
On November 15, 2025, an armed robber broke into Nana's home in Guri while the actress and her mother were inside. The two women managed to subdue him after a physical altercation during which they sustained minor injuries. The intruder subsequently filed a complaint against Nana alleging that he had been injured by a weapon belonging to her, but the police decided not to refer the case to the public prosecutor's office after determining that the actress's actions constituted legitimate self-defense. On June 9, 2026, the First Criminal Division of the Uijeongbu District Court's Namyangju Branch sentenced the man to seven years in prison and, in line with the police's reasoning, ruled that the injuries Nana inflicted on him were the result of self-defense.

=== Relationship ===
On October 2, 2026, Nana's agency, Sublime, confirmed reports that she and rapper T.O.P are in a relationship. The pair reportedly first met while filming T.O.P's music video in early January and stayed in touch, they then began dating in June.

== Public image ==
Nana's modeling work gained attention early in her career when she was selected as a main model for the Tokyo Girls Collection in 2011. A representative in Japan noted that the Tokyo Girls Collection usually only features professional models and that it is rare for a singer to appear as the main model. She has also served as a brand ambassador in fashion campaigns featuring distinctive concepts, such as "Deconstructivism and Goth Romantic."

Nana gained international attention through TC Candler's 100 Most Beautiful Faces list, placing second in 2013, first in 2014 and 2015, and remaining a recurring presence in later editions. In a 2015 pictorial for Cosmopolitan Korea, Nana appeared in the November issue discussing her figure and fitness routine. In 2024, Sports Chosun described her as a figure whose beauty continues to attract attention, referencing her past rankings on the list.

== Discography ==
=== Single albums ===
List of single albums, with selected details, chart positions, and sales
Title	Album details	Peak chart positions	Sales
Title	Album details	KOR	Sales
Seventh Heaven 16	Released: September 14, 2025; Label: Sublime; Formats: CD, digital download, streaming	96	KOR: 841

=== Singles ===
Title	Year	Peak chart positions	Album
Title	Year	KOR DL	Album
As lead artist
"Close Your Eyes"	2011	—	Shanghai Romance & Lipstick
"Eyeline"	2012	—	Flashback
"This Person" (Note: As part of Dazzling Red with Hyolyn, Hyuna, Hyoseong and Nicole.)	2012	—	Non-album single
"Sleeping Forest" (眠れる森)	2013	—	Orange Caramel
"God"	2025	—	Seventh Heaven 16
"So Well"	2026	—	Non-album single
As featured artist
"Ma Boy 3" (Electroboyz featuring Nana)	2013	—	In Love
"Wait A Minute" (잠깐만) (Hello Venus featuring Nana) (Note: Narration only.)	2013	—	Would You Stay for Tea?
Collaborations
"Be There" (with Lim Seul-ong)	2025	60	Non-album single
Soundtrack appearances
"Our Memories in Summer" (우리의 여름처럼) (with Park Sung-hoon)	2020	—	Memorials soundtrack
"—" denotes releases that did not chart or were not released in that region.

== Filmography ==
Key
†	Denotes films that have not yet been released

=== Film ===
Year	Title	Role	Notes	Ref.
2011	White: Melody of Death	Herself	Cameo	
2014	Fashion King	Kim Hae-na	Cameo	
2015	Go Lala Go 2	Sha Dangdang	Chinese film	
2017	The Swindlers	Choon-ja		
2022	Confession	Kim Se-hee		
2025	Omniscient Reader: The Prophecy	Jeong Hee-won		

=== Television series ===
Year	Title	Role	Notes	Ref.
2015	Love Weaves Through a Millennium	Zhao Nana	Chinese drama	
2016	The Good Wife	Kim Dan		
2019	Kill It	Do Hyun-jin		
2019	Justice	Seo Yeon-ah		
2020	Memorials	Goo Se-ra		
2021	Oh My Ladylord	Oh Joo-in		
2021	Genesis	Yeo Rin		
2022	Love in Contract	Yu-mi	Cameo (Episode 1)	
2022	Glitch	Heo Bo-ra		
2023	Mask Girl	Kim Mo-mi (After surgery)		
2023	My Man Is Cupid	Oh Baek-ryun		
2024	The Player 2: Master of Swindlers	Eun-na	Cameo	
2026	Climax	Hwang Jeong-won		
2026	The Scandal	Ahn Hui-yeon		
TBA	Ma Teresa †	Ma Teresa		

=== Variety shows ===
Year	Title	Role	Notes	Ref.
2010	Playgirlz School	Cast member		
2012	Tokyo Brand New Girls	Fixed panelist		
2014	Style Log	Host		
2014	Roommate	Cast member		
2014	Muse Dress	Cast member	Runner-up in competition overall	
2016	Real Men: Female Special	Cast member	Season 4 (Episode 146 and 147)	

== Awards and nominations ==
Name of the award ceremony, year presented, category, nominee of the award, and the result of the nomination
Award ceremony	Year	Category	Nominee / Work	Result	Ref.
APAN Star Awards	2016	Best New Actress	The Good Wife	Nominated	
Asia Artist Awards	2016	Best Rookie Award, Actress	The Good Wife	Won	
Asia Model Awards	2018	Popular Star Award	Nana	Won	
Baeksang Arts Awards	2017	Best New Actress	The Good Wife	Nominated	
Baeksang Arts Awards	2018	Bazaar Icon Award	Nana	Won	
Baeksang Arts Awards	2018	Best New Actress	The Swindlers	Nominated	
Chunsa Film Art Awards	2018	Popularity Award	Nana	Won	
Chunsa Film Art Awards	2023	Best Supporting Actress	Confession	Nominated	
Director's Cut Awards	2024	Best Actress in the Series	Mask Girl	Nominated	
Director's Cut Awards	2026	Best New Actress in the Series	Climax	Nominated	
Global OTT Awards	2026	Best Supporting Actress	Climax	Won	
KBS Drama Awards	2019	Excellence Award, Actress in a Miniseries	Justice	Won	
KBS Drama Awards	2019	Best New Actress	Justice	Nominated	
KBS Drama Awards	2019	Best Couple Award	Nana (with Choi Jin-hyuk); Justice	Nominated	
KBS Drama Awards	2019	Netizen Award, actress	Justice	Nominated	
KBS Drama Awards	2020	Best Couple Award	Nana (with Park Sung-hoon); Memorials	Won	
KBS Drama Awards	2020	Excellence Award, Actress in a Miniseries	Memorials	Won	
Korea Drama Awards	2016	Best New Actress	The Good Wife	Nominated	
Korea Film Actors Association Awards	2017	Popular Star Award	The Swindlers	Won	
MBC Drama Awards	2021	Best Couple Award	Nana (with Lee Min-ki); Oh My Ladylord	Nominated	
MBC Drama Awards	2021	Top Excellence Award, Actress in a Miniseries	Oh My Ladylord	Nominated	
Style Icon Awards	2014	Tony Moly K-Beauty	Nana	Won	
The Seoul Awards	2018	Best New Actress	The Swindlers	Nominated	
