= Choi Go =

South Korean actor (born 2012)

- Born: 16 November 2012 (age 13); Cheongju, South Korea
- Other name: Choigo
- Occupation: Actor
- Years active: 2016–present
- Known for: My Country: The New Age; Memorials; Trade Your Love

Choi Go is a South Korean child actor. He is known for his roles in dramas such as Nobody Knows, My Country: The New Age, and Her Private Life. He is best known for his role in the drama Memorials as Kim Ja-ryong.

== Filmography ==
=== Television series ===
Year	Title	Role	Notes	Ref.
2016	Bring It On, Ghost	Boy on the Bus	Episode: 1	
2018	Live	Boy from the Internet Cafe		
2018	Quiz of God	Han Jin-woo		
2019	Her Private Life	Ryan Gold		
2019	My Country: The New Age	Lee Bang-beon		
2020	Nobody Knows	Joo Han-sol		
2020	Memorials	Kim Ja-ryong		
2020	Sweet Home	Kim Yeong-soo		
2020	The Uncanny Counter	Orphan		
2021	Jirisan	Il-man's son		
2023	Sweet Home Season 2	Kim Yeong-soo		
2024	Chief Detective 1958	Kim Young-nam		
2024	Sweet Home Season 3	Kim Yeong-soo		

=== Film ===
Year	Title	Role	Ref.
2016	Familyhood	Pyeong-goo's child	
2017	Forgotten	Choi Seung-uk	
2018	Kokdu: A Story of Guardian Angels	Dong-min	
2018	The Discloser	Young-woo's son	
2019	Trade Your Love	Park Hee-ro	

== Awards and nominations ==
Year	Award	Category	Nominated work	Result
2020	34th KBS Drama Awards	Best Young Actor	Memorials	Nominated
