= The Swindlers (2017 film) =

- Theatrical release poster
- Hangul: 꾼
- RR: Kkun
- MR: Kkun
- Directed by: Jang Chang-won
- Written by: Jang Chang-won
- Produced by: Sung Chang-yeon
- Starring: Hyun Bin; Yoo Ji-tae; Bae Seong-woo; Park Sung-woong; Nana; Ahn Se-ha
- Cinematography: Lee Tae-yoon
- Music by: Bang Jun-seok
- Production company: Showbox
- Distributed by: Showbox
- Release date: November 22, 2017
- Running time: 117 minutes
- Country: South Korea
- Language: Korean
- Box office: US$28.9 million

The Swindlers (Korean: 꾼) is a 2017 South Korean crime comedy film directed by Jang Chang-won in his directional debut. It stars Hyun Bin, Yoo Ji-tae, Bae Seong-woo, Park Sung-woong, Nana, and Ahn Se-ha. The film depicts the unpredictable teamwork of scammers catching a legendary con artist.

== Plot ==
A shocking news report announces the sudden death of Jang Doo-chil, a notorious con artist who once turned South Korea upside down. However, rumors quickly spread that he is still alive, and speculation arises that powerful figures who once protected him deliberately set him free.

Ji-sung, a swindler who specializes in deceiving other con artists, insists that Jang Doo-chil is still alive and proposes a plan to capture him to prosecutor Park Hee-soo, who is in charge of the case. Park secretly recruits three skilled scammers, Go Seok-dong, Choon-ja, and Chief Kim, to form an unofficial investigation team. Together, they devise a strategy to track down Jang Doo-chil's elusive right-hand man, Kwak Seung-gun.

However, Park has his own hidden agenda beyond simply arresting Jang Doo-chil. Sensing his ulterior motives, Ji-sung and the rest of the crew begin crafting their own schemes to ensure they don't fall for each other's tricks.

== Cast ==
- Hyun Bin as Hwang Ji-sung
- Yoo Ji-tae as Prosecutor Park Hee-soo
- Bae Seong-woo as Go Seok-dong
- Park Sung-woong as Kwak Seung-gun
- Nana as Choon-ja
- Ahn Se-ha as Chief Kim
- Choi Deok-moon as Lee Kang-suk
- Choi Il-hwa as Lawmaker Sung
- Heo Sung-tae as Jang Du-chil
- Kim Tae-hoon as Attorney general
- Jung Jin-young as Hwang Yoo-suk (special appearance)
- Oh Tae-kyung as Tae-dong (special appearance)
- Cha Soon-bae as CEO Kang (special appearance)
- Jin Seon-kyu as Older cousin (special appearance)

== Release and reception ==
=== Local ===
The Swindlers opened in South Korea on November 22, 2017, grossing US$1.4 million from 213,185 admissions on the first day of its release.

The film topped the local box office for three consecutive weeks.

By December 19, 2017, The Swindlers exceeded 4 million in cumulative attendance, and collected US$28.9 million in total.

=== International ===
The film was released internationally in ten territories: Australia, New Zealand, North America, Hong Kong, Macao, Taiwan, Japan, Britain and the Philippines.

== Awards and nominations ==
Year	Awards	Category	Recipient	Result	Ref.
2017	6th Korea Film Actors Association Awards	Popular Star Award	Nana	Won	
2018	54th Baeksang Arts Awards	Best New Actress	Nana	Nominated	
2018	2nd The Seoul Awards	Best Supporting Actor	Bae Seong-woo	Nominated	
2018	2nd The Seoul Awards	Best New Actress	Nana	Nominated	
