= Trade Your Love =

- Theatrical release poster
- Hangul: 어쩌다, 결혼
- RR: Eojjeoda, gyeolhon
- MR: Ŏtchŏda, kyŏrhon
- Directed by: Park Ho-chan; Park Soo-jin
- Written by: Park Soo-zin; Park Ho-chan
- Produced by: Billy Acumen
- Starring: Kim Dong-wook; Ko Sung-hee
- Cinematography: So Jung-o
- Edited by: Kim Woo-il; Lim Sin-mee
- Music by: Mok Young-jin
- Production companies: B.A. Entertainment; Artist Studio
- Distributed by: CGV Arthouse
- Release date: February 27, 2019
- Running time: 87 minutes
- Country: South Korea
- Language: Korean
- Box office: US$216,009

Trade Your Love (Korean: 어쩌다) is a 2019 South Korean romantic comedy film directed by Park Ho-chan and Park Soo-jin. It stars Kim Dong-wook and Ko Sung-hee.

== Plot ==
Sung-seok and Hae-joo meet at a blind date and decide to enter into a contract marriage to get what they want.

== Cast ==
- Kim Dong-wook as Sung-seok
- Ko Sung-hee as Hae-joo
- Hwang Bo-ra as Song Mi-yeon
- Kim Eui-sung as Captain Chae
- Im Ye-jin as Hae-joo's mother
- Yum Jung-ah as Mrs. Cheon
- Choi Go as Park Hee-ro
- Lee Chae-eun as Oh Hye-jin
- Jo Woo-jin as Section chief Seo
- Kang Shin-chul as Lee Jae-yeong
- Son Ji-hyun as Kim Sin-ah
- Kim Sun-young as Jo Soo-jeong
- Yoo Seung-mok as Coach
- Lee Jun-hyeok as Wedding studio photographer
