= Happiness (South Korean TV series) =

2021 South Korean television series

- Promotional poster
- Hangul: 해피니스
- RR: Haepiniseu
- MR: Haep'inisŭ
- Genre: Thriller
- Created by: Yang Ji-eul (Tving); Lee Myung-han (tvN)
- Developed by: Kim Young-kyu; Studio Dragon
- Written by: Han Sang-woon
- Directed by: Ahn Gil-ho
- Starring: Han Hyo-joo; Park Hyung-sik; Jo Woo-jin
- Country of origin: South Korea
- Original language: Korean
- No. of episodes: 12

Production
- Executive producer: Jo Moon-ju
- Producers: Hong Won-ju; Jeong Se-mi
- Running time: 70 minutes
- Production company: Studio Dragon

Original release
- Network: TVING; tvN
- Release: November 5 – December 11, 2021

Happiness (Korean: 해피니스) is a 2021 South Korean television series produced by Studio Dragon and starring Han Hyo-joo, Park Hyung-sik and Jo Woo-jin. It is an apocalyptic thriller that takes place in a time when infectious diseases have become the new normal. It aired on tvN every Friday and Saturday at 22:40 (KST) from November 5 to December 11, 2021. It is also available for streaming on Viki, Viu, Netflix, Amazon Prime Video, Max, and iQIYI in selected territories.

While achieving respectable but modest ratings during its original run, Happiness became a sleeper hit upon its global release on streaming platforms in April 2022. Thanks to good word of mouth, appreciation for the chemistry between the two leads and execution of zombie genre, it rose to number seven on the Weekly Global Top 10 in non-English TV show category on Netflix.

Due to the success of the series, Han Hyo-joo was nominated for Best Leading Actress and the Popular Star Award at the 2022 Blue Dragon Series Awards, of which she won the latter. A spin-off webtoon of the same title was serialized on Naver Webtoon from November 12, 2021, to May 27, 2022.

== Synopsis ==
=== Setting ===
Happiness takes place in the near future, where the release of a failed treatment drug "Next" has caused a worldwide pandemic known as the Lytta Virus, a.k.a. "mad person disease". Those infected by Lytta experience short bouts of insanity and bloodlust, before completely regressing into a zombie-like state. The South Korean Military and Police forces try to contain the spread of Lytta and Next through extensive investigation and authoritative quarantine measures, while civil rights groups protest against them, believing the infected are still capable of normal human interaction.

=== Plot ===
Yoon Sae-bom encounters a trainee at the Special Operations Unit who is infected by mad person disease. In the struggle to subdue the trainee, she is scratched, leading her to meet Han Tae-seok at a research facility. The facility houses many of the "patients" who are kept under observation in order to understand and cure the disease. It is revealed that the symptoms of mad person disease are first accompanied by unabated thirst, followed by the pupils turning white, and then thirst for human blood. The disease is not airborne, but spreads through scratches and bites, with Yoon Sae-bom seemingly immune to the disease. Some of those who contracted the disease are ultimately able to return to their former selves temporarily. Yoon Sae-bom makes a deal with Han Tae-seok which leads her to secure an apartment in a newly constructed building. However, in order to do so, she must be married, so she asks her high school friend Jung Yi-hyun, a former star baseball player but now a police detective, and he agrees to a contract marriage. The building is luxurious and stratified, with public rentals making up the first five floors, and those who own apartments for the upper ones. Class discrimination is evident when upper floor resident Oh Yeon-ok struggles at being the apartment's representative while keeping everyone in check. Yoon Sae-bom meets interesting and strange residents, forming a close attachment to her neighbor's young daughter.

Through Jung Yi-hyun's detective work, he encounters a diseased person who he believes became this way due to a failed pneumonia drug called Next, which had been widely circulated in order to promote attentiveness and strength. This assumption is later confirmed when a resident member who consumed the drug, secretly sold to her in the building's gym, ultimately becomes infected with the mad person disease and succumbs to the illness. This begins the outbreak in the building. In an effort to protect the residents in his building, Jung Yi-hyun and Yoon Sae-bom establish quarantine rules, while securing the building from the outside with the help of his captain, Kim Jung-guk. Jung Yi-hyun conflicts with building resident Oh Joo-hyung, who seems to encourage destructive behavior in the building. The question of humanity and whether to view those infected with mad person disease as human beings forms a psychological battle for Sae-bom, Yi-hyun and Tae-seok.

Han Tae-seok initially tries to keep the mad person disease a secret, but with more cases progressing and people getting panicked, the secret is revealed to the public. With an increasing number of people getting infected, Han Tae-seok and his military team struggle to determine whether to preserve these people or kill them off. Han Tae-seok orders the complete quarantine of the new building complex where Yoon Sae-bom and Jung Yi-hyun live, offering them a chance to leave the building before it becomes completely sealed off. However, they decline the offer. Yoon Sae-bom's blood contains antibodies that could hold the cure for the disease, which Han Tae-seok seeks to exploit. It is revealed that Han Tae-seok's pregnant wife was bitten by the president of the pharmaceutical company that supplied Next, and ultimately became infected with the disease. His search for the cure is in part motivated to find a cure for his wife and to save his unborn child.

== Cast ==
=== Main ===
- Han Hyo-joo as Yoon Sae-bom

A member of a Special Operation Unit police squad (KP-SOU) formerly known as KP-SWAT. She was excited to move into her new apartment, but as soon as she moves there she faces a crisis.

- Park Hyung-sik as Jung Yi-hyun

A detective who has romantic feelings for Sae-bom; they graduated from the same high school. He struggles to protect Sae-bom and other people.

- Jo Woo-jin as Han Tae-seok

A lieutenant colonel and part of the health service command. He holds a key to the infectious disease outbreak.

=== Supporting ===
People around Jung Yi-hyun

- Seo Hyun-chul as Yi-hyun's father
- Jung Jae-eun as Yi-hyun's mother
- Lee Jun-hyeok as Kim Jung-guk

Yi-hyun's supervisor.

Extended

- Baek Hyun-jin as Oh Joo-hyung

A dermatologist.

- Han Da-sol as Lee Bo-ram

A mart employee.

- Lee Ji-ha as Jo Ji-hee
- Moon Ye-won as Woo Sang-hee

A dermatologist.

- Park Hee-von as Na Hyun-kyung

A romance web novelist.

- Park Hyung-soo as Kook Hae-seong

A lawyer.

- Park Joo-hee as Ji-soo

A lieutenant.

- Kim Young-woong as Go Se-kyu
- Na-cheol as Na Soo-min

Na Hyun-kyung's brother.

- Cha Soon-bae as Seon Woo-chang

A pastor.

- Yoo Ji-yeon as Colonel Han Tae Seok's wife
- Lee Joo-seung as Andrew

A cleaning company employee.

- Han Joon-woo as Kim Se-hoon

An intellectual who moves around the world with his diplomat parents.

- Kang Han-sam as BJ Kim Dong-hyun
- Bae Hae-sun as Oh Yeon-ok
- Hong Soon-chang as Kim Hak-je
- Lee Joo-sil as Ji Sung-sil
- Kim Ju-yeon as Kang Eun-ji

Seo-yoon's mother.

- Nam Mi-jung as Lee Deok-soon

A cleaning lady.

- Jung Woon-sun as Shin So-yoon
- Joo Jong-hyuk as Kim Seung-beom
- Song Ji-woo as Park Seo-yoon

=== Special appearances ===
- Lee Kyu-hyung as Lee Seung-young (eps. 1–3, 8, 12)
- Baek Joo-hee as Park Min-ji (eps. 2–3)
- Lee Seung-joon as Kim Dae-yoon (ep. 12)

A brigadier general.

== Production ==
Happiness is helmed by director Ahn Gil-ho and writer Han Sang-woon. It is the first acting project of Park Hyung-sik since his discharge from military service on January 4, 2021. First script reading with the cast was held on May 7, 2021, and filming began on May 11.

== Original soundtrack ==
Happiness

Soundtrack album by Various Artists
- Released: 2021
- Genre: Soundtrack
- Languages: Korean; English
- Labels: Genie Music; Stone Music Entertainment

=== Part 1 ===
Released on November 20, 2021
No.	Title	Lyrics	Music	Artist	Length
1.	"What Lies Ahead"	Joe Layne	Joe Layne	Joe Layne	3:40
Total length:					3:40

=== Part 2 ===
Released on December 4, 2021
No.	Title	Lyrics	Music	Artist	Length
1.	"Pain"	Cray Bin	Cray Bin	Hong Isaac	3:23
2.	"Pain" (Inst.)		Cray Bin		3:23
Total length:					6:47

=== Part 3 ===
Released on December 11, 2021
No.	Title	Lyrics	Music	Artist	Length
1.	"ENIGMA"	Naiv	Naiv	Jemma	3:38
2.	"ENIGMA" (Inst.)		Naiv		3:38
Total length:					7:16

== Viewership ==
Happiness : South Korea viewers per episode (thousands)

Season	Episode number												Average
Season	1	2	3	4	5	6	7	8	9	10	11	12	Average
1	761	793	852	905	939	804	959	833	942	895	958	1110	896

Source: Audience measurement performed nationwide by Nielsen Korea

Average TV viewership ratings
Ep.	Original broadcast date	Average audience share (Nielsen Korea)	
Ep.	Original broadcast date	Nationwide	Seoul
1	November 5, 2021	3.300% (2nd)	4.103% (2nd)
2	November 6, 2021	3.196% (2nd)	3.679% (2nd)
3	November 12, 2021	3.574% (2nd)	3.862% (2nd)
4	November 13, 2021	3.324% (2nd)	3.841% (2nd)
5	November 19, 2021	3.542% (2nd)	4.217% (2nd)
6	November 20, 2021	3.084% (2nd)	3.494% (2nd)
7	November 26, 2021	3.539% (2nd)	4.176% (2nd)
8	November 27, 2021	3.251% (2nd)	3.597% (2nd)
9	December 3, 2021	3.740% (2nd)	4.377% (2nd)
10	December 4, 2021	3.263% (2nd)	3.735% (2nd)
11	December 10, 2021	3.543% (2nd)	3.857% (2nd)
12	December 11, 2021	4.185% (2nd)	4.433% (2nd)
Average		3.462%	3.948%
In the table above, the blue numbers represent the lowest ratings and the red numbers represent the highest ratings.; This series aired on a cable channel/pay TV which normally has a relatively smaller audience compared to free-to-air TV/public broadcasters (KBS, SBS, MBC and EBS).

== Awards and nominations ==
Name of the award ceremony, year presented, category, nominee of the award, and the result of the nomination
Ceremony	Year	Award	Recipient	Result	Ref.
1st Blue Dragon Series Awards	2022	Best Actress	Han Hyo-joo	Nominated	
1st Blue Dragon Series Awards	2022	Best Supporting Actress	Bae Hae-sun	Nominated	

== International broadcast ==
ABS-CBN acquired the exclusive rights to broadcast Happiness in Filipino dubbing. The series premiered on Kapamilya Channel and other blocktime television channels and platforms on Mondays to Fridays at 22:15 (PST) on April 21, 2025, which then moved to 22:05 (PST) on May 27. It is also available for streaming on iWantTFC in the Philippines. After a year, the network announced that it will re-air on July 28, 2026 on Kapamilya Gold's afternoon block replacing Kapamilya Gold Hits, this timeslot will set to air at 16:45 (PST) before TV Patrol Express.
