= Kill It =

South Korean television series

- Promotional poster
- Hangul: 킬잇
- RR: Kirit
- MR: K'irit
- Genre: Thriller
- Created by: Studio Dragon
- Written by: Son Hyun-soo; Choi Myung-jin
- Directed by: Nam Sung-woo; Ahn Ji-sook
- Starring: Jang Ki-yong; Nana
- Music by: Kim Joon-seok (Movie Closer)
- Country of origin: South Korea
- Original language: Korean
- No. of episodes: 12

Production
- Camera setup: Single-camera
- Running time: 60 minutes
- Production company: Crave Works

Original release
- Network: OCN
- Release: March 23 – April 28, 2019

Kill It (Korean: 킬잇) is a 2019 South Korean television drama starring Jang Ki-yong and Nana. It was broadcast on the Orion Cinema Network (OCN) from 23 March to 28 April 2019. The series follows the intertwined fates of a man abandoned by the devil and a woman raised by the devil, as well as the client who seeks vengeance against them. Blending elements of action, mystery and melodrama, *Kill It* explores the fatal encounter between a man destined to die and a woman determined to capture him.

== Plot ==
By day, Kim Soo-hyun (Jang Ki-yong) is a gifted veterinarian, calm and compassionate, devoted to saving the lives of stray and injured animals. Yet behind this gentle persona lies a chilling truth — he is one of the most efficient assassins in the world. Operating under a veil of secrecy, Soo-hyun has built a fearsome reputation among global criminal networks as a master of precision, elusive as a shadow and silent as death itself. His life is governed by cold logic and anonymity, until fate draws him towards an encounter that will unravel everything he thought he knew about himself.

Do Hyun-jin (Nana), a brilliant and determined detective, is known for her sharp instincts and unflinching pursuit of justice. Beneath her controlled, stoic exterior lies a deeply compassionate soul, haunted by the memory of a personal loss that still drives her. When a series of mysterious murders shakes Seoul, Hyun-jin's investigation leads her straight to Soo-hyun — a man whose calm eyes conceal a violent secret. Convinced that he is the killer, she begins a relentless pursuit, only to uncover a truth far more complex and devastating than she ever anticipated.

As Hyun-jin delves deeper, long-buried connections emerge between the two. Years ago, Soo-hyun was rescued and raised by Pavel, a European contract killer who had originally been sent to murder him on his father's orders. Stricken by guilt, Pavel spared the boy and raised him as his adopted son — training him in the art of assassination but also urging him to live freely, unbound by violence. When Pavel falls ill and embarks on one last job, his failure leads to capture and torture by a mafia syndicate. Soo-hyun's rescue mission ends in bloodshed, leaving Pavel mortally wounded and a vengeful enemy, Karimov, in his wake.

Now, with his mentor gone and his past resurfacing, Soo-hyun stands at the crossroads of fate. Bound to Hyun-jin by tragedy and truth, the two must confront secrets that tie their lives — and the lives of those they have lost — together in ways neither could have foreseen. In a world where every kill leaves a scar and every truth hides another lie, love and justice collide in a deadly game of redemption.

== Cast ==
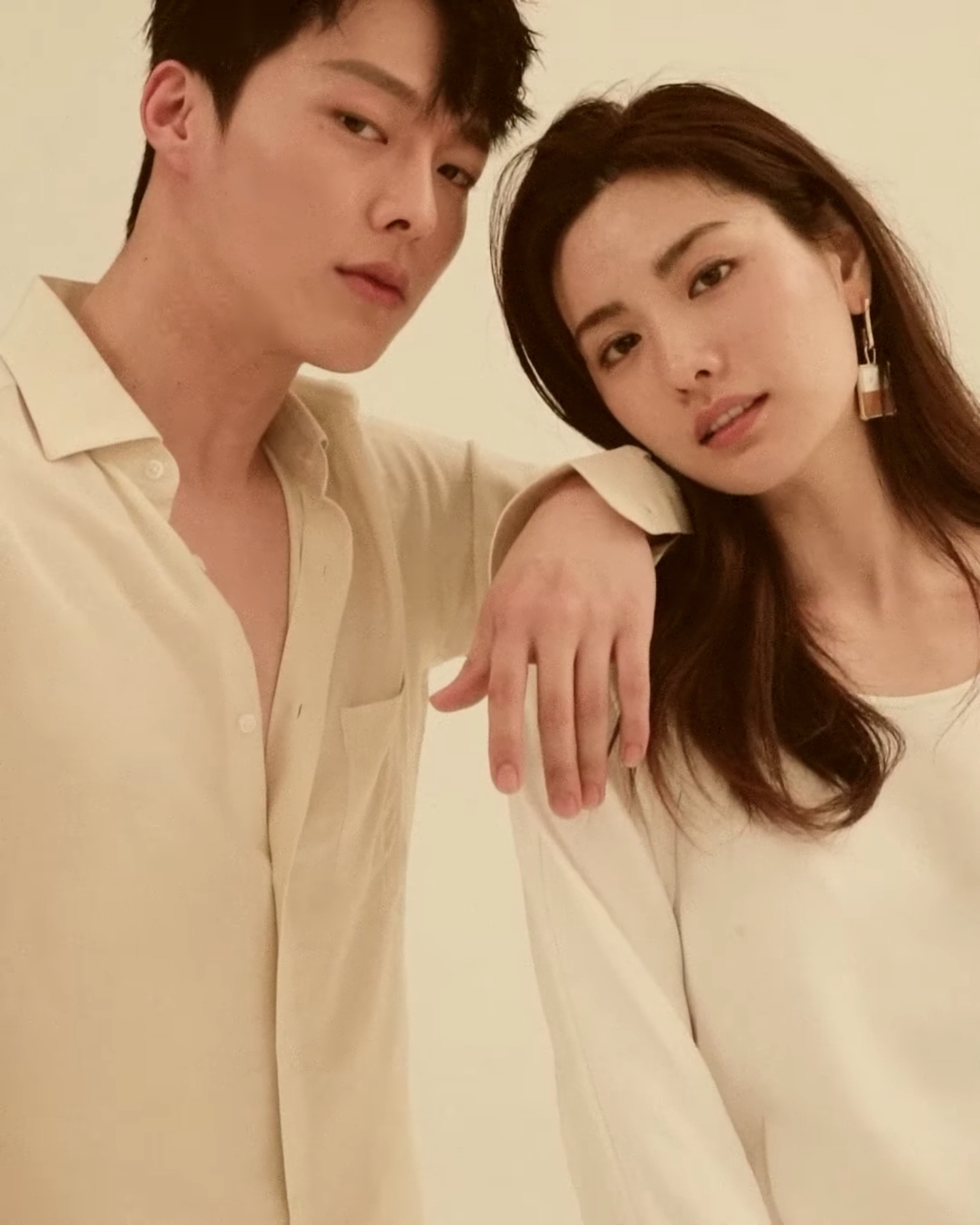
Main actors Jang Ki-yong and Nana in 2019

=== Main ===
- Jang Ki-yong as Kim Soo-hyun
  - Moon Woo-jin as young Soo-hyun

A skilled killer that many gangs seek and a veterinarian.

- Nana as Do Hyun-jin / Lee Young-eun

A detective who graduated at the top of her class at the police academy and who tries to find her past lover's murderer.

=== Supporting ===
==== People around Soo-hyun ====
- Roh Jeong-eui as Min Ji/Kang Seul-gi
  - Joo Ye-rim as young Seul-gi
- Lee Jae-won as Ahn Philip

Soo-hyun's hitman broker.

- David Lee McInnis as Pavel

==== At Seoul Police Station ====
- Kim Hyun-mok as Lee Yoon Seung

Hyun-jin's junior detective

- Ji Il-joo as Yoon Jung-woo

A prosecutor and a gamer.

- Kwak Ja-hyung as Park Sung-ho

An assistant Inspector

- Ahn Se-ho as Jang Gwang-joon

Medical Examiner.

- Park Geun-soo as Lee Sang-yeon

==== People around Hyun-jin ====
- Jung Hae-kyun as Do Jae-hwan,

Hyun-jin's adoptive father and primary antagonist of the series. He is the mastermind behind the artificial semination and organ harvesting operation.

- Jung Jae-eun as Jung So-yeon

Hyun-jin's mother

- Kim Joo-hun as Min-hyuk

Nana's (Do Hyun-jin) ex-boyfriend. He was a witness to Seul-gi grandfather's 'Kim Il-ho murder case' and a reporter who died in a mysterious way.

==== Others ====
- Robin Deiana as Karimov II
- Jo Han-chul as Go Hyun-woo
- Ok Go-woon as Yoon Ji-hye
- Jeon Jin-gi as Joo Young-hoon
- Kim Sun-bin as Jeon Yong-ki
- Son Kwang-eop as Seo Won-suk

== Production ==
- Early working title of the series is Blue Eyes (Korean: 블루 아이즈).
- The first script reading was held in January 2019.

== Controversy ==
Kill It was supposed to be produced by BaramiBunda Inc., but the company's CEO Cho Jung-ho was accused of embezzlement. Studio Dragon and Crave Works later assumed production duties.

== Original soundtrack ==
Kill It OST

Soundtrack album by Various artists
- Recorded: 2019
- Genre: Soundtrack
- Languages: Korean; English
- Labels: Vlending; Music Buddy

=== Part 1 ===
Released on March 23, 2019
No.	Title	Lyrics	Music	Artist	Length
1.	"Forever Love"	Han Joon	Lee Yoo-jin	Min Kyung-hoon (Buzz)	3:46
2.	"Forever Love" (Inst.)		Lee Yoo-jin		3:46
Total length:					7:32

=== Part 2 ===
Released on March 30, 2019
No.	Title	Lyrics	Music	Artist	Length
1.	"My Everything"	Han Joon	Lee Yoo-jin	Han Seung-hee	3:32
2.	"My Everything" (Inst.)		Lee Yoo-jin		3:32
Total length:					7:04

=== Part 3 ===
Released on April 6, 2019
No.	Title	Lyrics	Music	Artist	Length
1.	"Take Out My Heart"	Han Joon	Lee Yoo-jin	Jung Dong-ha	3:12
2.	"Take Out My Heart" (Inst.)		Lee Yoo-jin		3:12
Total length:					6:24

=== Part 4 ===
Released on April 13, 2019
No.	Title	Lyrics	Music	Artist	Length
1.	"A Secret That Can't Be Told" (말할 수 없는 비밀)	Jin Min-ho, Kim Sung-yoon	Jin Min-ho	Jang Hee-young	03:38
2.	"A Secret That Can't Be Told (Inst.)" (말할 수 없는 비밀)		Jin Min-ho		03:38
Total length:					07:16

=== Part 5 ===
Released on April 20, 2019
No.	Title	Lyrics	Music	Artist	Length
1.	"You,Like,Me"	Han Gil, Han Joon	Han Gil, D&T	Kim Bo-kyung	03:24
2.	"You,Like,Me (Inst.)"		Han Gil, D&T		03:24
Total length:					06:48

=== Part 6 ===
Released on April 29, 2019
No.	Title	Lyrics	Music	Artist	Length
1.	"Just Stay"	Han Joon	Han Gil	ALi	03:18
2.	"Just Stay (Inst.)"		Han Gil		03:18
Total length:					06:36

== Ratings ==
Kill It : South Korea viewers per episode (thousands)

Season	Episode number												Average
Season	1	2	3	4	5	6	7	8	9	10	11	12	Average
1	TBD	628	315	628	TBD	580	TBD	376	TBD	571	TBD	601	TBD

Source: Audience measurement performed nationwide by Nielsen Media Research.

Average TV viewership ratings
Ep.	Original broadcast date	Average audience share (AGB Nielsen)	
Ep.	Original broadcast date	Nationwide	Seoul
1	March 23, 2019	1.114%	—N/a
2	March 24, 2019	2.321%	2.819%
3	March 30, 2019	1.311%	1.460%
4	March 31, 2019	2.757%	3.420%
5	April 6, 2019	1.085%	1.742%
6	April 7, 2019	2.216%	2.535%
7	April 13, 2019	0.926%	—N/a
8	April 14, 2019	1.772%	2.338%
9	April 20, 2019	1.021%	—N/a
10	April 21, 2019	2.298%	2.860%
11	April 27, 2019	1.359%	—N/a
12	April 28, 2019	2.546%	2.896%
Average		1.727%	— (Note: Due to some ratings not recorded, the exact average rating is unknown.)
In the table above, the blue numbers represent the lowest ratings and the red numbers represent the highest ratings.; N/A denotes that the rating is not known.; This drama aired on a cable channel/pay TV which normally has a relatively smaller audience compared to free-to-air TV/public broadcasters (KBS, SBS, MBC and EBS).
