= Justice (South Korean TV series) =

2019 South Korean television series

- Promotional poster
- Hangul: 저스티스
- RR: Jeoseutiseu
- MR: Chŏsŭt'isŭ
- Genre: Legal drama
- Based on: Justice by Jang Ho
- Developed by: KBS Drama Production
- Written by: Jeong Chan-mi
- Directed by: Jo Woong
- Starring: Choi Jin-hyuk; Son Hyun-joo; Nana; Park Sung-hoon
- Music by: Kim Joon-seok
- Country of origin: South Korea
- Original language: Korean
- No. of episodes: 32 (Note: In order to circumvent Korean laws that prevent commercial breaks in the middle of an episode, what would previously have been aired as single 70 minute episodes are now being repackaged as two 35 minute episodes, with two episodes being shown each night with a commercial break between the two.)

Production
- Camera setup: Single-camera
- Running time: 35 minutes
- Production companies: Production H; FN Entertainment

Original release
- Network: KBS2
- Release: July 17 – September 5, 2019

Justice (Korean: 저스티스) is a 2019 South Korean television series starring Choi Jin-hyuk, Son Hyun-joo, Nana, and Park Sung-hoon. It is based on the web novel Justice, written by Jang Ho and illustrated by Elja. The series aired on KBS2's Wednesdays and Thursdays at 22:00 (KST) from July 17 to September 5, 2019.

== Synopsis ==
Lee Tae-kyeong is a lawyer who often helps CEO Song Woo-yong's richest clients.

== Cast ==
=== Main ===
- Choi Jin-hyuk as Lee Tae-kyung (34 years old)

One of the industry's most successful lawyers.

- Son Hyun-joo as Song Woo-yong (53 years old)

Chung-Hyung Construction's President.

- Nana as Seo Yeon-ah (30 years old)

A competitive prosecutor. Tae-kyung's former girlfriend.

- Park Sung-hoon as Tak Soo-ho (33 years old)

Jung Jin Group's Vice Chairman.

=== Supporting ===
==== People around Yeon-ah ====
- Lee Hak-joo as Ma Dong-hyuk (31 years old)

A Homicide Detective at Gangnam Police Station.

- Lee Ho-jae as Seo Dong-seok (62 years old)

Yeon-ah's father. Former Attorney General.

==== Seoul Central District Prosecutor's Office ====
- Kim Ji-hyun as Cha Nam-sik (45 years old)

Chief Inspector.

- Oh Man-seok as Joo Man-yong (50 years old)

Assistant Prosecutor General.

- Lee Seo-hwan as Gook Jin-tae (45 years old)

Chief Inspection Officer.

- Lee Bom-so-ri Park Hyo-Rim (23 years old)

An assistant.

==== People around Tae-kyung ====
- Jo Dal-hwan as Nam Won-gi (42 years old)

Tae-kyung's assistant.

- Kim Hyun-mok as Lee Tae-joo (22 years old at the time of death)

Tae-kyung's younger brother.

==== Jang Entertainment Company ====
- Ji Hye-won as Jang Yeong-mi (24 years old)

A rookie actress.

- Lee Seo-an as Jeong Hae-jin (27 years old)

A rookie actress.

- Yang Hyun-min as Jang Chi-soo (39 years old)

Jang Entertainment's President.

- Kim Min-seok as Lee Dong-il (27 years old)

A succulent manager.

==== People around Son Woo-yong ====
- Kim Hee-chan as Song Dae-jin (28 years old)

Song Woo-young's son.

- Jang In-sub as Section chief Choi (34 years old)

Song Woo-yong's right hand.

- Lee Gang-Wook as Jo Hyun-Woo (29 years old)

The driver who caused Tae-joo to die in a traffic accident.

==== Others ====
- Lee Dae-yeon as Detective Kang (59 years old)

A Homicide Detective at Gangnam Police Station

- Kim Ju-mi as Shim Seon-hee (21 years old)

Victim of methanol case.

- Song Duk-ho as Shim Kwang-hee (25 years old)

Shim Seon-hee's brother.

- Heo Dong-Won as Yang Chul-Ki (59 years old)

Man with 7 criminal charges.

- Lee Hwang-Eui as Do Hoon-Je (55 years old)

Currently the head of the National Tax Service and the next Minister of Land, Transport and Tourism.

- Han Ki-Joong as Shin Il-Hoon

Chairman of the Ilshin Ilbo, the most influential Korean media company.

- Park Han-sol as Yeon-hyo
- Lee Eol as Public Prosecutor General.

== Production ==
- Early working title of the series is Inner Circle (이너 서클).
- The first script reading was held in April 2019 at KBS Annex Broadcasting Station in Yeouido, South Korea.

== Viewership ==
Justice : South Korea viewers per episode (thousands)

Episodes	Episode number															
Episodes	1	2	3	4	5	6	7	8	9	10	11	12	13	14	15	16
1–16	983	1065	N/A	786	935	1206	N/A	845	N/A	866	765	905	N/A	856	N/A	822
17–32	N/A	786	N/A	905	860	933	817	962	999	1068	798	868	838	1017	N/A	953

Source: Audience measurement performed nationwide by Nielsen Media Research.

Average TV viewership ratings
Ep.	Original broadcast date	Average audience share (Nielsen Korea)	
Ep.	Original broadcast date	Nationwide	Seoul
1	July 17, 2019	6.1% (13th)	6.2% (14th)
2	July 17, 2019	6.4% (11th)	6.5% (12th)
3	July 18, 2019	3.8% (NR)	—N/a
4	July 18, 2019	4.8% (19th)	—N/a
5	July 24, 2019	5.5% (19th)	6.0% (15th)
6	July 24, 2019	6.3% (16th)	6.4% (12th)
7	July 25, 2019	4.2% (NR)	—N/a
8	July 25, 2019	5.4% (18th)	5.8% (13th)
9	July 31, 2019	4.3% (NR)	—N/a
10	July 31, 2019	4.6% (NR)	—N/a
11	August 1, 2019	4.4% (19th)	4.7% (19th)
12	August 1, 2019	5.3% (15th)	5.5% (15th)
13	August 7, 2019	4.2% (NR)	—N/a
14	August 7, 2019	5.1% (19th)	—N/a
15	August 8, 2019	4.3% (NR)	—N/a
16	August 8, 2019	5.0% (16th)	4.9% (17th)
17	August 14, 2019	4.2% (NR)	—N/a
18	August 14, 2019	4.7% (20th)	—N/a
19	August 15, 2019	4.7% (20th)	—N/a
20	August 15, 2019	5.4% (16th)	5.8% (14th)
21	August 21, 2019	5.0% (20th)	5.1% (19th)
22	August 21, 2019	5.8% (16th)	5.6% (15th)
23	August 22, 2019	5.3% (18th)	5.1% (19th)
24	August 22, 2019	6.2% (14th)	6.3% (11th)
25	August 28, 2019	6.0% (13th)	5.7% (13th)
26	August 28, 2019	6.4% (9th)	6.0% (10th)
27	August 29, 2019	5.7% (16th)	6.0% (12th)
28	August 29, 2019	6.2% (14th)	6.3% (10th)
29	September 4, 2019	5.8% (15th)	5.8% (15th)
30	September 4, 2019	7.0% (11th)	7.2% (8th)
31	September 5, 2019	3.4% (NR)	—N/a
32	September 5, 2019	6.3% (13th)	6.5% (12th)
Average		5.2%	— (Note: Due to some ratings not recorded, the exact average rating is unknown.)
