= The Best of After School 2009–2012: Korea Ver. =

The Best of After School 2009-2012: Korea Ver.

Greatest hits album by After School
- Released: March 27, 2013
- Recorded: 2009–12
- Genre: Dance-pop
- Label: Avex Trax

After School chronology
Flashback (2012)	The Best of After School 2009-2012: Korea Ver. (2013)	First Love (2013)

The Best of After School 2009–2012: Korea Ver. (stylized as THE BEST OF AFTERSCHOOL 2009-2012 -Korea Ver.-) is the first greatest hits album by South Korean girl group After School. It was released on March 27, 2013, by Avex Trax along with the groups first live DVD, After School First Japan Tour 2012 - Playgirlz-. The album contains all of After School's singles. The album also includes songs from A.S. Red & Blue and both "Happy Pledis" singles from 2010 and 2011. The limited-edition version comes with a DVD featuring all of After School's music videos up to 2012.

== Track listing ==
All editions:
No.	Title	Lyrics	Producer(s)	Length
1.	"Play Girlz"	Brave Brothers	Brave Brothers	1:32
2.	"AH"	Brave Brothers	Brave Brothers	3:12
3.	"Diva"	Brave Brothers	Brave Brothers	3:23
4.	"Because of You" (너 때문에)	Brave Brothers	Brave Brothers	4:01
5.	"When I fall"	Kahi	Magnus Lidehäll, Jacob Olofsson, Viktoria Sandström	3:23
6.	"Bang!"	Kim Hee Sun, Bekah	Kim Tae Hyun, Mordney Present	3:21
7.	"Shampoo"	Won Tae Yeon	Daishi Dance, Tomoharu Moriya	4:38
8.	"In The Night Sky" (A.S. RED)	Brave Brothers	Brave Brothers	3:22
9.	"Wonder Boy" (A.S. BLUE)	An Young Min	Cho Young Soo	3:45
10.	"LOVE LOVE LOVE" (Happy Pledis 1st Album)	Raina	Anders Dannvik & Krististian Lagerstr	3:04
11.	"Someone is you" (Happy Pledis 1st Album)	Kahi	Daniel Barkman & Jordan Ringqvist	4:01
12.	"Love Letter" (Happy Pledis 2nd Album; Son Dam Bi & After School featuring Ara, Lime from Hello Venus, Minhyun, Baekho from NU'EST, Park Junghyun)	Kim Eana	Melody9	3:27
13.	"FLASHBACK"	TEXU	TEXU	3:15
Total length:				44:24

DVD:
No.	Title	Length
1.	"AH (Music Video)"	3:28
2.	"Diva (Music Video)"	3:18
3.	"Because of You"	4:14
4.	"Let's Do It! (Music Video)"	1:32
5.	"Bang! (Music Video)"	3:19
6.	"Let's Step Up (Music Video)"	1:51
7.	"Shampoo (Music Video)"	4:35
8.	"In The Night Sky (Music Video)" (A.S. RED)	3:35
9.	"Wonder Boy (Music Video)" (A.S. BLUE)	3:44
10.	"LOVE LOVE LOVE (Music Video)" (Happy Pledis 1st Album)	3:44
11.	"Love Letter (Music Video)" (Happy Pledis 2nd Album; Son Dam Bi & After School featuring Ara, Lime from Hello Venus, Minhyun, Baekho from NU'EST, Park Junghyun)	3:32
12.	"FLASHBACK (Music Video)"	3:29
Total length:		40:21

== Chart performance ==
=== Oricon chart ===
Released	Oricon Chart	Peak	Debut Sales	Sales Total	Chart Run
March 27, 2013	Daily Album Chart	17	3,235	3,750+	2 weeks
March 27, 2013	Weekly Album Chart	40	3,235	3,750+	2 weeks

== Release history ==
Region	Date	Label	Format	Catalog
Japan	March 27, 2013	Avex Trax	CD+DVD Limited Edition	AVCD-38723/B
Japan	March 27, 2013	Avex Trax	CD only Edition	AVCD-38724
