= Climax (TV series) =

2026 South Korean television series

- Promotional poster
- Hangul: 클라이맥스
- RR: Keullaimaekseu
- MR: K'ŭllaimaeksŭ
- Genre: Political; Survival; Noir
- Written by: Lee Ji-won; Shin Ye-seul
- Directed by: Lee Ji-won
- Starring: Ju Ji-hoon; Ha Ji-won; Nana; Oh Jung-se; Cha Joo-young
- Music by: Hong Dae-sung
- Country of origin: South Korea
- Original language: Korean
- No. of episodes: 10

Production
- Running time: 60 minutes
- Production companies: Hive Media Corp; SLL; TME Group

Original release
- Network: ENA; Genie TV
- Release: March 16 – April 14, 2026

Climax (Korean: 클라이맥스) is a 2026 South Korean political survival noir television series directed by Lee Ji-won, who also co-wrote the screenplay with Shin Ye-seul. Starring Ju Ji-hoon, Ha Ji-won, Nana, Oh Jung-se, and Cha Joo-young, the series follows the ascent of prosecutor Bang Tae-seop as he navigates the cutthroat hierarchy of South Korea's power cartel.

It aired on ENA from March 16, to April 14, 2026, every Monday and Tuesday at 22:00 (KST). It is available for streaming on Genie TV and Disney+ in South Korea and globally via Rakuten Viki and Viu.

== Synopsis ==
Set within the world of major South Korean conglomerates and the entertainment industry, the series centers on a married couple whose mutual ambition ultimately leads each to betray the other in pursuit of power and success.

== Cast and characters ==
=== Main ===
- Ju Ji-hoon as Bang Tae-seop

A political rising star and feared prosecutor in Seoam District's office. From a poor background, he worked tirelessly to become a prosecutor, only to find the office was corrupt, prioritizing money and power. So he partnered with top star Chu Sang-ah to climb the ranks.

- Ha Ji-won as Chu Sang-ah

South Korea's top actress. Despite constant scandals surrounding her, her biggest fear is losing herself. She experienced a glamorous period, captivating audiences with her charm and aura, until announcing her marriage to Tae-seop, a prosecutor, in a sudden move that garnered significant attention. Although their marriage sparked rumors, a stronger, more persistent desire drove them. Her standing began to slip as her films flopped and a decade-old murder case regained public attention.

- Nana as Hwang Jeong-won

A significant force in altering the cartel's power structure. Her life changed following her mother's death; she was accused of murdering her father and met Tae-seop, the prosecutor handling the case. Upon release from prison, she led a quiet life until reconnecting with Tae-seop, who recognized her intelligence and resourcefulness and recruited her as an intelligence agent.

- Oh Jung-se as Kwon Jong-wook

The eldest son of WR Group and the executive director of WR Construction. He seems elite with impressive lineage, but as he speaks, his true nature's revealed. His father remarried Yang-mi six years ago because of the hotel business. To push her out of the WR heir position, he teamed up with Bang Tae-seop, who had the same aim.

- Cha Joo-young as Lee Yang-mi

The second wife of WR Group and president of WR Hotels & Entertainment. She navigates both the power structure and South Korea's entertainment industry, with connections in each sphere. Just as everything's falling into place and her goal's within grasp, an unexpected event throws everything off balance.

=== Supporting ===
- Han Dong-hee as Han Ji-soo
- Seo Hyun-woo as Oh Gwang-jae
- Bae Yoon-gyu as Nam Woo-sik

== Production ==
=== Development ===
Lee Ji-won, who helmed and wrote the film Miss Baek (2018), is directing the series, and also co-wrote the script with Shin Ye-seul. The production is handled by Hive Media Corp, SLL and TME Group.

=== Casting ===
In December 2023, Ju Ji-hoon reportedly received an offer as the male lead and decided to appear. Ha Ji-won, Nana, Oh Jung-se, and Cha Joo-young were reportedly considering in November 2024. By November 2025, Ju, Ha, Nana, Oh, and Cha were officially confirmed to lead the series.

=== Filming ===
The filming of the Climax was initially scheduled to begin in the second half of 2024, but it was then moved to the first half of 2025. Principal photography began on March 15, 2025, near Gyeonggi Province.

== Release ==
In November 2025, Climax was slated to release on ENA in 2026, and would be available to stream on Genie TV subsequently. In January 2026, the series was reportedly scheduled to air in March 2026. By February 2026, the series was confirmed to premiere on March 16, 2026, and will air every Monday and Tuesday at 22:00 (KST). It is available to stream on Disney+ in South Korea and globally via Rakuten Viki and Viu.

== Viewership ==
Climax : South Korea viewers per episode (thousands)

Season	Episode number										Average
Season	1	2	3	4	5	6	7	8	9	10	Average
1	713	852	930	845	771	857	777	677	778	893	809

Source: Audience measurement performed nationwide by Nielsen Korea.

Average TV viewership ratings
Ep.	Original broadcast date	Average audience share (Nielsen Korea)	
Ep.	Original broadcast date	Nationwide	Seoul
1	March 16, 2026	2.919% (2nd)	2.762% (2nd)
2	March 17, 2026	3.834% (2nd)	4.075% (2nd)
3	March 23, 2026	3.871% (2nd)	3.994% (1st)
4	March 24, 2026	3.520% (2nd)	3.713% (1st)
5	March 30, 2026	3.248% (2nd)	3.288% (2nd)
6	March 31, 2026	3.462% (2nd)	3.329% (2nd)
7	April 6, 2026	3.133% (2nd)	3.105% (2nd)
8	April 7, 2026	2.875% (2nd)	2.775% (2nd)
9	April 13, 2026	3.290% (1st)	3.001% (1st)
10	April 14, 2026	3.920% (1st)	4.000% (1st)
Average		3.407%	3.404%
In the table above, the blue numbers represent the lowest ratings and the red numbers represent the highest ratings.; This drama aired on a cable channel/pay TV which normally has a relatively smaller audience compared to free-to-air TV/public broadcasters (KBS, SBS, MBC, and EBS).

== Accolades ==
Award ceremony	Year	Category	Recipient(s)	Result	Ref.
Director's Cut Awards	2026	Best New Actress (Drama)	Nana	Nominated	
