= Agency (South Korean TV series) =

2023 South Korean television series

- Promotional poster
- Hangul: 대행사
- RR: Daehaengsa
- MR: Taehaengsa
- Genre: Workplace
- Written by: Song Soo-han
- Directed by: Lee Chang-min
- Starring: Lee Bo-young; Son Na-eun; Jo Sung-ha; Han Joon-woo
- Music by: Kim Hyun-jong; Ahn So-yeong
- Country of origin: South Korea
- Original language: Korean
- No. of episodes: 16

Production
- Executive producers: Kim So-jung; Shin Seon-joo (CP); Hwang Hyeon-mi (CP)
- Producers: Park Jin-young; Son Jae-seong
- Running time: 60–72 minutes
- Production companies: How Pictures; Drama House; SLL (provider)

Original release
- Network: JTBC
- Release: January 7 – February 26, 2023

Agency (Korean: 대행사) is a 2023 South Korean television series starring Lee Bo-young, Son Na-eun, Jo Sung-ha, and Han Joon-woo. It aired on JTBC from January 7 to February 26, 2023, every Saturday and Sunday at 22:30 (KST) for 16 episodes.

The series was a commercial hit and became one of the highest-rated dramas in Korean cable television history.

== Synopsis ==
The story follows Go Ah-in who becomes the first female executive member of a large advertising agency.

== Cast ==
=== Main ===
- Lee Bo-young as Go Ah-in

A creative director who leads Production Team 2 of VC Planning, a leading advertising agency. She has a strong desire for success despite growing up in poverty.

- Son Na-eun as Kang Han-na
  - Oh Ji-yul as young Kang Han-na

VC Group's third generation chaebol.

- Jo Sung-ha as Choi Chang-su

The director of the planning division of VC Planning who strives to become CEO.

- Han Joon-woo as Park Young-woo

Han-na's loyal right-hand man.

=== Supporting ===
People at VC Planning

- Jeon Hae-jin as Jo Eun-jung

A copywriter of VC Planning's Production Team 2.

- Lee Chang-hoon as Han Byung-soo

An art director of VC Planning's Production Team 2.

- Lee Kyung-min as Seo Jang-woo

An assistant manager of VC Planning's Production Team 2.

- Kim Dae-gon as Kwon Woo-cheol

The creative director of VC Planning's Production Team 1.

- Jung Woon-sun as Bae Won-hee

A copywriter of VC Planning's Production Team 1.

- Park Ji-il as Jo Moon-ho

CEO of VC Planning.

- Baek Soo-hee as Jung Su-jeong

Ah-in's secretary.

People around Ah-in

- Kim Mi-kyung as Seo Eun-ja

Ah-in's mother.

- Jang Hyun-sung as Yoo Jung-seok

Ah-in's mentor.

- Shin Soo-jung as Oh Soo-jin

Ah-in's friend who is a psychiatrist.

- Lee Ki-woo as Jung Jae-hoon

CEO of a game company.

- Kim Soo-jin as Choi Jung-min

CEO of an independent agency.

People at VC Group

- Jeon Gook-hwan as Kang Geun-cheol

The founder of VC Group.

- Song Young-chang as Kang Yong-ho

The chairman of VC Group.

- Jo Bok-rae as Kang Han-soo

The vice president of VC Group Headquarters.

- Jung Seung-gil as Kim Tae-wan

The chief secretary of VC Group Headquarters.

- Kim Min-sang as Bae Jung-hyeon

The legal team leader VC Group Headquarters.

Others

- Jung Won-joong as Kim Woo-won

The chairman of Woowon Group.

- Jung Ye-bin as Kim Seo-jung

Woo-won's only daughter who is the vice president of Woowon Group.

- Kim Ra-on as Song Ah-ji

Eun-jung's son.

- Jo Eun-sol as Song Jung-ho

Eun-jung's husband.

- Yoon Bok-in as Park Kyung-sook

Eun-jung's mother-in-law.

=== Extended ===
- Kim Chae-eun as Yoo Ji-woo

Jung-seok's daughter.

- Lee Dong-ha

=== Special appearance ===
- Song Young-kyu as Hwang Seok-woo

== Viewership ==
Agency : South Korea viewers per episode (millions)

| Season | Episode number | | | | | | | | | | | | | | | | Average |
| Season | 1 | 2 | 3 | 4 | 5 | 6 | 7 | 8 | 9 | 10 | 11 | 12 | 13 | 14 | 15 | 16 | Average |
|---|---|---|---|---|---|---|---|---|---|---|---|---|---|---|---|---|---|
| 1 | 1.105 | 1.206 | 1.477 | 1.919 | 1.487 | 1.802 | 2.063 | 2.693 | 2.586 | 2.675 | 2.291 | 2.764 | 2.567 | 3.055 | 3.037 | 3.685 | 2.276 |

Source: Audience measurement performed nationwide by Nielsen Korea.

Average TV viewership ratings
| Ep. | Original broadcast date | Average audience share (Nielsen Korea) | |
| Ep. | Original broadcast date | Nationwide | Seoul |
|---|---|---|---|
| 1 | January 7, 2023 | 4.797% (3rd) | 5.520% (2nd) |
| 2 | January 8, 2023 | 5.102% (2nd) | 5.369% (2nd) |
| 3 | January 14, 2023 | 6.481% (2nd) | 7.149% (1st) |
| 4 | January 15, 2023 | 8.907% (1st) | 9.286% (1st) |
| 5 | January 21, 2023 | 5.869% (1st) | 6.545% (1st) |
| 6 | January 22, 2023 | 7.711% (1st) | 8.111% (1st) |
| 7 | January 28, 2023 | 9.150% (1st) | 9.606% (1st) |
| 8 | January 29, 2023 | 11.959% (1st) | 12.400% (1st) |
| 9 | February 4, 2023 | 10.902% (1st) | 11.692% (1st) |
| 10 | February 5, 2023 | 11.629% (1st) | 12.434% (1st) |
| 11 | February 11, 2023 | 10.444% (1st) | 11.372% (1st) |
| 12 | February 12, 2023 | 12.658% (1st) | 14.135% (1st) |
| 13 | February 18, 2023 | 11.049% (1st) | 11.360% (1st) |
| 14 | February 19, 2023 | 13.383% (1st) | 14.041% (1st) |
| 15 | February 25, 2023 | 13.149% (1st) | 13.841% (1st) |
| 16 | February 26, 2023 | 16.044% (1st) | 17.267% (1st) |
| Average | | 9.952% | 10.633% |
In the table above, the blue numbers represent the lowest ratings and the red numbers represent the highest ratings.; This series aired on a cable channel/pay TV which normally has a relatively smaller audience compared to free-to-air TV/public broadcasters (KBS, SBS, MBC, and EBS).
