= Dress to Kill (After School album) =

Studio album by After School
- Released: March 19, 2014
- Recorded: 2012–2014
- Genres: Pop; dance; disco; house; EDM; new jack swing
- Label: Avex Trax

After School chronology
First Love (2013)	Dress to Kill (2014)	Best (2015)

Singles from Dress to Kill
- 1. "Heaven" Released: October 2, 2013; 2. "Shh" Released: January 29, 2014

Dress to Kill (stylized as Dress to kill)) is the second Japanese and third overall studio album by South Korean girl group After School. It was released on March 19, 2014, in Japan under Avex Trax. The album was released in three versions, a CD & DVD Limited Press Edition, a CD Edition (mu-mo Version) and a regular CD Edition. It was preceded by the singles "Heaven" and "Shh". It was the last studio album released by After School before going on an indefinite hiatus.

== Editions ==
The album was released in three different editions: CD & DVD Limited Press Edition, CD Edition (mu-mo Version), and the Regular CD Edition. The CD & DVD Limited Press Edition contains the CD album, and a DVD containing the music video for Heaven, two music videos for Shh (the regular music video and a Dance edit music video) and group performances from the Play Girlz Japan Fan Meeting 2013 at Shinkiba Studio Coast show including "Diva", "Flashback, "Heaven", "Crazy Driver" and "Slow Love".

The regular CD edition of Dress to Kill contains only the album itself along with a Japanese Version of "Flashback" as a bonus track. The CD Edition (mu-mo Version) of Dress to Kill contains only the album itself along with a previously unreleased song titled "Lucky Girl" as a bonus track.

== Commercial performance ==
In its first week, Dress to Kill charted at number 33 with 4,252 copies sold, a large dip from the sales of their first album.

== Track listing ==
CD
No.	Title	Lyrics	Music	Length
1.	"Dress code ～Theme of “Dress to kill”～"		Tak Miyazawa	0:30
2.	"Dress to kill"	Reika Yuuki	Jon Levine / Pam Sheyne / Ross Golan	3:21
3.	"Ms.Independent"	Kanata Okajima	Albi Albertsson, Johanna Elkesdotter	3:39
4.	"Triangle"	Kyasu Morizuki	T-SK / Liv NERVO / Mim NERVO / tesung kim	3:41
5.	"Crazy Driver"	Mutsumi	Lubo Slavicek	3:29
6.	"Shh"	Kyasu Morizuki	Shinichi Osawa	4:58
7.	"Yes No Yes"	Kanata Okajima	Andreas Oberg / Kevin Charge / Kanata Okajima	3:36
8.	"Heaven"	Mutsumi	Shinichi Osawa	4:44
9.	"in the moonlight"	KAJI KATSURA	Andreas Oberg / Maria Marcus / Julimar Santos	3:41
10.	"rock it!"	KAJI KATSURA	Erik Nyholm / Eric Palmqwist	3:41
11.	"Spotlight"	Kyasu Morizuki	Caroline Gustavsson / Hanna Söderberg	3:43
12.	"Killing eyes ～End of “Dress to kill”～"		Tak Miyazawa	0:27

DVD: Music videos & Play Girlz Japan FAN MEETING 2013 Performances
No.	Title	Length
1.	"Heaven" (Music video)
2.	"Shh" (Music video)
3.	"Shh" (Dance Edit Music video)
4.	"Diva"
5.	"FLASHBACK"
6.	"Heaven"
7.	"Crazy Driver"
8.	"SLOW LOVE"
9.	"Making Movie"

Bonus tracks (CD Only Edition)
No.	Title	Lyrics	Music	Length
13.	"Flashback (JPN Ver.)"	H.U.B.	TEXU a.k.a saint binary	3:15

Bonus tracks (CD Only (mu-mo Version) Edition)
No.	Title	Lyrics	Music	Length
13.	"Lucky Girl"	KAJI KATSURA	Mats Tarnfors / Marica Linde	3:51

== Charts ==
=== Oricon charts ===
Released	Oricon Chart	Peak	Debut sales	Sales total
March 19, 2014	Daily Album Chart	14	4,252	4,252
March 19, 2014	Weekly Album Chart	33	4,252	4,252

=== Other charts ===
Chart	Peak position
Billboard Japan Top Albums	35

== Release history ==
Country	Date	Format	Label
Japan	March 19, 2014	CD+DVD Limited Edition, CD only	Avex Trax
