= Flashback (single album) =

Single album by After School
- Released: 20 June 2012
- Recorded: 2012
- Genre: K-pop
- Length: 17:41
- Label: Pledis; LOEN
- Producer: TEXU

After School chronology
Playgirlz (2012)	Flashback (2012)	The Best of After School 2009–2012: Korea Ver. (2013)

Singles from Flashback
- 1. "Flashback" Released: 20 June 2012

Flashback is the fifth single album by South Korean girl group After School. The maxi-single marks the first appearance of fifth generation member, Kaeun. This also marks the first comeback since Kahi's official graduation from the group to pursue a solo career.

== Background ==
On 9 April 2012, Pledis revealed that a brand new member would be added to the group. The following day, the member was officially revealed to be Kaeun and details regarding a Korean comeback in June were revealed.

On 11 June 2012, the first teaser image, featuring all eight members, for the comeback was released to the public via Pledis Entertainment's website. Later that day the title of the maxi-single was revealed, "Flashback", along with the track list. The following day, a second teaser picture was released featuring third generation member Lizzy. The photo showed that the group are returning to their sexy concept as Lizzy was seen wearing black mesh clothing and was in a seductive, sultry pose which is similar to the concept the group had when they debuted. A day after Lizzy's teaser photo, Uie's photo was revealed, followed by Nana & Raina, Jungah, Juyeon, and lastly E-Young & Kaeun. Although it was speculated that Nana would become the leader, Pledis announced the empty leader position with the graduation of Kahi will be taken on by Jungah.

== Critical reception ==
Flashback received generally positive feedback worldwide. Embrace You magazine described the maxi single as "creative, fun, exciting, well organized, and demonstrates brilliant production efforts. There are no fillers or musically incorrect additions; each track has the potential to stand on its own and appeal to not only pop and dance fans, but to lovers of ballads and R&B." The American-based webzine gave "Flashback" a rating of 5 out of 5 for perfection.

"Flashback", was the fourth most played song on Korean broadcast and radio charts according to Air Monitor, a website that monitors and calculates song airplays from 23 different radio stations in Korea. The song managed to beat tough competition from Super Junior, 2NE1 and Sistar. In addition, "Flashback" ranked number six on Billboard's Top 20 K-Pop Songs of 2012.

== Commercial performance ==
The title track, "Flashback", was downloaded 202,940 times in South Korea after 2 days of its release. In July 2012, the song was downloaded 414,825 times, after being downloaded 363,875 times in June 2012, and rose to #26 on the Gaon Monthly Download Chart. The song has since been downloaded over 1 million times. "Flashback" debuted at No. 15 on the Gaon Weekly Singles Chart and peaked at No. 14 the following week. The maxi-single debuted at No. 3 on the Gaon Weekly Album Chart selling 14,197 copies. As of the end of 2012, the maxi-single has sold 16,885 copies in South Korea.

== Track listing ==
No.	Title	Lyrics	Music	Length
1.	"Rip Off" (Korean Version)	Jungah	Joleen Belle, William "Bleu" McAuley, Windy Wagner	3:00
2.	"Flashback"	TEXU	TEXU	3:17
3.	"Eyeline" (Nana Solo)	Min Sul	Pitchline	3:19
4.	"Wristwatch" (손목시계; Sonmoksigye)	Kim Hyunah	Wook Park	4:11
5.	"Timeless" (Jungah & Raina Duet)	Raina	Thomas Karlsson, Jukoo, Rike Boomgarden	3:55
Total length:				17:41

== Credits and personnel ==
- Jungah – main vocals
- Jooyeon – vocals, background vocal
- Uee – vocals, background vocal
- Raina – main vocals, background vocal
- Nana – lead vocals, rap, background vocal
- Lizzy – lead vocals, rap, background vocal
- E-young – vocals, background vocal
- Kaeun – vocals, background vocal

== Charts ==
=== Weekly charts ===
Chart (2012)	Peak position
South Korea (Gaon)	14
South Korea (K-pop Hot 100)	10
South Korean Albums (Gaon)	3
Taiwanese East Asian Albums (G-Music)	11

=== Monthly charts ===
Chart (2012)	Peak position
South Korean Albums (Gaon)	11

=== Year-end charts ===
Chart (2012)	Position
South Korean Albums (Gaon)	86

== Sales ==
Region	Sales amount
South Korea	16,885

== Release history ==
Country	Date	Format	Label
South Korea	20 June 2012	Digital download	Pledis Entertainment
South Korea	21 June 2012	CD single	Pledis Entertainment
Japan	2 July 2012	CD single	Pledis Entertainment
Taiwan	24 April 2013	CD and DVD	Avex Taiwan
