= Jung Jae-eun (actress) =

South Korean actress (born 1969)

- Born: Jung Jae-eun; 3 June 1969 (age 57); Seoul, South Korea
- Other name: Jeong Jae-eun
- Education: Dongguk University (Department of Theater and Film)
- Occupations: Actress; model
- Years active: 1989–present
- Agent: MUMW
- Known for: Who Are You: School 2015; I'm Sorry, But I Love You; Kill It
- Spouse: Seo Hyun-chul (m. 2009)
- Children: 1

Korean name
- Hangul: 정재은
- RR: Jeong Jaeeun
- MR: Chŏng Chaeŭn

Jung Jae-eun (Korean: 정재은; born 3 June 1969) is a South Korean actress. She is known for her roles in dramas such as Who Are You: School 2015, I'm Sorry, But I Love You and Kill It.

== Personal life ==
She married fellow actor Seo Hyun-chul in 2009 and they have one daughter.

== Filmography ==
=== Television series ===
Year	Title	Role	Ref.
2008	Iljimae	Shim-deok	
2012	Drama Special Series: "SOS - Save Our School"	Jeong Mi-won	
2014	KBS Drama Special: "Middle School Student A"	Hwang Seon-mi	
2015	Who Are You: School 2015	So-yeong's mother	
2016	I'm Sorry, But I Love You	Mrs. Min	
2017	A Korean Odyssey	Maternal Aunt	
2018	Lovely Horribly	Eul-soon's mother	
2019	Kill It	Jung So-yeon	
2021	Nobleman Ryu's Wedding	Lady Shim	
2021	Happiness	Yi-hyun's mother	
2022	Tomorrow	Koo Ryeon's mother-in-law	

=== Film ===
Year	Title	Role	Language	Ref.
2006	Road	Gwi-ok	Korean	
2011	Themselves	Han-na	Korean	
2018	Stranger Coming	Ji-ho	Korean	
2022	Nobleman Ryu's Wedding	Lady Shim	Korean	

== Theatre ==
Year	Title	Korean Title	Role	Ref.
2021	The Dressing Room	분장실		
2022	Vincent River	빈센트 리버	Anita	

== Awards and nominations ==
Year	Award	Category	Nominee / Work	Result	Ref.
2017	2017 SBS Entertainment Awards	Rookie Award in Show/Talk Category	Single Wife	Won	
