= Han Joon-woo =

South Korean actor

Han Jun-woo
- Born: 28 March 1984 (age 42); South Korea
- Education: University of Massachusetts
- Occupation: Actor
- Years active: 2010–present
- Agent: Andmarq

Korean name
- Hangul: 한준우
- Hanja: 韓俊宇
- RR: Han Junu
- MR: Han Chunu

Han Jun-woo (Korean: 한준우; born 28 March 1984) is a South Korean actor. He is known for his roles in dramas Be Melodramatic (2019), My Unfamiliar Family (2020), Memorials (2020), Pachinko (2022), and Agency (2023).

== Early life ==
Han Joon-woo is a South Korean actor. He was born on 28 March 1984. He graduated from University of Massachusetts.

== Career ==
He made his debut as an actor in 2010. He appeared in the films Tazza: The Hidden Card and Gangnam Blues. In 2017, he appeared in movie 1987: When the Day Comes and he also appeared in drama series Hyena, My Unfamiliar Family and Memorials.

== Filmography ==
=== Film ===
| Year | Title | Role | Ref. |
|---|---|---|---|
| 2010 | An Old Potter | unknown | |
| 2013 | Mr. Go | Reporter | |
| 2014 | Tazza: The Hidden Card | Choi Wang-geun | |
| 2015 | Gangnam Blues | Tom | |
| 2015 | Twenty | Club DJ | |
| 2017 | 1987: When the Day Comes | Black suit man | |
| 2017 | Calling | Tyler | |
| 2018 | To My River | Senior Teacher | |
| 2019 | Extreme Job | Detective | |
| 2023 | Dream | Enterprise Staff 2 | |

==== Short film ====
| Year | Title | Role | Ref. |
|---|---|---|---|
| 2022 | Parasite (Bogeumjari) | Jun-woo | |

=== Television series ===
| Year | Title | Role | Notes | Ref. |
|---|---|---|---|---|
| 2017 | Sense8 | Lawyer | | |
| 2018 | Top Management | Manager | | |
| 2019 | Be Melodramatic | Hong-dae | | |
| 2020 | Hyena | Kim Young-joon | | |
| 2020 | My Unfamiliar Family | Kim Sang-shik | | |
| 2020 | Memorials | Kim Min-jae | | |
| 2021 | Love Scene Number | Park Jung-seok | | |
| 2021 | Happiness | Kim Se-hoon | | |
| 2022 | Through the Darkness | Goo Young-chun | Cameo | |
| 2022 | The Empire | Oh Sung-hyun | | |
| 2022–present | Pachinko | Baek Yoseb | Season 1–2 | |
| 2023 | Agency | Park Young-woo | | |
| 2024 | Flex X Cop | Go Young-bum | Cameo (episode 5–6) | |
| 2024 | Love Next Door | Song Hyeon-jun | cameo (episode 7–8) | |
| 2025 | Hyper Knife | Alan Kim | | |
| 2025 | Sirens Kiss | | | |
| 2025 | Heroes Next Door | James Lee Sullivan | | |
