= Big Sancho =

Big Sancho 빅싼초
- Also known as: BickSancho
- Born: Kim Tae-ho
- Genres: Pop, R&B; hip hop
- Occupations: Record producer; songwriter; composer
- Years active: 2014–present
- Labels: Cube; Yummy Tone Producing Team

Kim Tae-ho (Korean: 김태호), professionally known as Big Sancho (빅싼초), is a South Korean record producer, songwriter and composer. He is part of the producing team Yummy Tone.

== Songwriting and composing credits ==
Songwriting and composing credits adapted from MelOn artist page until December 2020.

Year	Song title	Artist	Album	Songwriter	Producer
2014	Do Better	Scarlet	Do Better	Yes	No
2014	French Kiss	Hyuna	A Talk	Yes	No
2014	Red	Hyuna	A Talk	No	Yes
2014	But Go	A.KOR	But Go	Yes	Yes
2014	Wanna Be	Apink	Pink LUV	No	Yes
2015	Show Me	4minute	Crazy	Yes	No
2015	Stand Out	4minute	Crazy	Yes	Yes
2015	Crazy	4minute	Crazy	Yes	Yes
2015	What Do I Do	CLC	Question	Yes	No
2015	Curious (Like)	CLC	Question	Yes	Yes
2015	Hey-yo	CLC	Question	Yes	Yes
2015	Giddy Up	BtoB	Complete	Yes	Yes
2015	Summer Romance	BtoB	Complete	Yes	Yes
2015	Live Well Yourself	BtoB	Complete	Yes	No
2015	Get Out of My House	Hyuna	A+	Yes	Yes
2015	Ice Ice	Hyuna	A+	Yes	No
2015	Roll Deep	Hyuna	A+	Yes	Yes
2015	Run & Run (Intro)	Hyuna	A+	No	Yes
2015	Red#Must Triumph	Leesa	Band Top 3 Part 3	No	Yes
2016	Canvas	4minute	Act.7	Yes	Yes
2016	Yaya (Say Bye to Solo)	CLC	Refresh	Yes	Yes
2016	Because Like You	BtoB	Remember That	Yes	Yes
2016	Day by Day	CLC	Nu.Clear	Yes	Yes
2016	Freaky	Hyuna	A'wesome	Yes	Yes
2016	Do It!	Hyuna	A'wesome	Yes	Yes
2016	How's This?	Hyuna	A'wesome	Yes	No
2016	Pentagon	Pentagon	Pentagon	Yes	Yes
2016	Wake Up (Intro)			Yes	No
2016	Special Christmas	Hyuna Jang Hyun-seung BtoB Roh Ji-hoon CLC Pentagon	2016 United Cube Project Part 1	Yes	Yes
2017	Mistake	CLC	Crystyle	Yes	Yes
2017	Hobgoblin	CLC	Crystyle	Yes	Yes
2017	Liar	CLC	Crystyle	Yes	No
2017	What's Going On?	Triple H	199X	Yes	Yes
2017	I Like It	CLC	Free'sm	Yes	Yes
2017	BAE	CLC	Free'sm	Yes	Yes
2017	Party (Follow Me)	Hyuna	Following	Yes	Yes
2017	Nanana	BtoB	Brother Act.	Yes	Yes
2017	Lip & Hip	Hyuna	Lip & Hip	Yes	Yes
2017	Bend Over	Cheetah	28 Identity	No	Yes
2018	Don't Text Me	(G)I-dle	I Am	Yes	Yes
2018	Latata	(G)I-dle	I Am	No	Yes
2018	Mermaid	Lee Min-hyuk (BtoB) Peniel Jung Il-hoon Yeeun (CLC) Wooseok (Pentagon) Soyeon ((G)I-dle)	One	No	Yes
2018	Retro Future	Triple H	REtro Futurism	Yes	Yes
2018	Hann (Alone)	(G)I-dle	Hann (Alone)	No	Yes
2018	L.O.U	The Boyz	The Sphere	No	Yes
2018	PPParty	Ten to Ten	Smoke Dance Bar	No	Yes
2018	Morning Sun	TVXQ	New Chapter No. 2: The Truth of Love	No	Yes
2019	Senorita	(G)I-dle	I Made	No	Yes
2019	Love is Over	Rocket Punch	Pink Punch	No	Yes
2019	Hann (Alone)	Park Bom	Queendom Part 1	No	Yes
2019	Lion	(G)I-dle	Queendom Final Comeback	No	Yes
2019	Drinkin'	Nature	Nature World: Code A	Yes	Yes
2019	High Tension	Mamamoo	Reality In Black	No	Yes
2019	Blah Blah	Luri	Blah Blah	Yes	Yes
2020	Primero	Kisum	The 1st Key to Sum Island	No	Yes
2020	Oh My God	(G)I-dle	I Trust	No	Yes
2020	Luv U	(G)I-dle	I Trust	No	Yes
2020	Be Cautious	Ryu Su-jeong	Tiger Eyes	Yes	Yes
2020	Love Again	Seo Eun-kwang	FoRest : Entrance	Yes	Yes
2020	Winter Fantasy	Sera; Raina; Soyul; Nada; Gayoung; Subin; Jung Yu-jin	MBN Miss Back Part.5	Yes	Yes
2021	Sign	Subin	MBN Miss Back Part.10	Yes	Yes
