= Catallena =

2014 single by Orange Caramel

Single by Orange Caramel
- Language: Korean
- B-side: So Sorry; Cry
- Released: 12 March 2014
- Genre: Pop; Italo disco; hi-NRG
- Length: 3:13
- Label: Pledis; Kakao M
- Songwriters: Igy; Seo Yong-bae
- Producers: Igy; Seo Yong-bae

Orange Caramel Korean singles chronology
| "Lipstick" (2012) | "Catallena" (2014) | "My Copycat" (2014) |

Music video
- "Catallena" on YouTube

"Catallena" (Korean: 까탈레나) is a song by South Korean girl group Orange Caramel. The song was written and produced by both Igy and Seo Yong-bae. It was released for digital download and streaming 12 March 2014 by Pledis Entertainment and Kakao M, as the group's third Korean-language single and sixth single overall. Musically, the song is a hybrid of pop, Italo disco and hi-NRG styles, and interpolates the Punjabi folk song "Jutti Meri" in the chorus. The lyrics find Orange Caramel being enticed by a woman referred to as "Catallena".

Upon release, the song received generally favourable reviews from music critics, who praised the eclectic mix of musical styles and "clever" production. "Catallena" was a commercial success in South Korea, with the digital version peaking at number six on the Gaon Digital Chart, while the physical edition charted at number five on the Gaon Album Chart. The digital version sold over 1,011,735 copies in the country as of December 2014, and also peaked at number 4 on the Billboard K-pop Hot 100 and number 11 on the US World Digital Songs chart.

An accompanying music video, directed by Digipedi, was uploaded to Pledis Entertainment's YouTube channel on 12 March 2014. The quirky visual depicts the group as mermaids and pieces of sushi. For promotional purposes, Orange Caramel performed "Catallena" on several South Korean music programs in 2014, including M! Countdown, Show! Music Core, and Inkigayo, where they dressed as various food items.

== Background and release ==
Orange Caramel, the first sub-unit of South Korean girl group After School, had achieved mainstream success with hit singles such as "Magic Girl", "Bangkok City" and "Shanghai Romance" since their debut in 2010 as a three-member girl group. The group consisted of Raina, Nana and Lizzy. As one of the most-successful sub-unit groups, the trio are well known for their oddball and "Candy Culture" concepts. In late 2013, the group's record label, Pledis Entertainment, announced that Orange Caramel were preparing for a comeback the following February. However, the comeback was delayed until the beginning of March 2014. On 18 February of that year, the group posted a teaser on their official Facebook page, announcing the release of their third single, titled "Catallena". The teaser showed the leg of a woman hiding behind a pink wall, with her wearing a polka-dot styled vintage skirt, stockings and high-heels. It was followed by another teaser that was released two days later, which was based on a still-cut image from the then-upcoming music video. On 26 February 2014, the release date for the single was announced. It marked the group's first Korean release in 17 months since "Lipstick" in 2012, and their sixth single overall.

"Catallena" was made available for digital download and streaming as a single in various countries through Pledis Entertainment and Kakao M on 12 March 2014. The physical CD single for the song was released in South Korea on 14 March 2014 by the aforementioned record labels. The song was written and composed by the group's long-time collaborators Igy and Seo Yong-bae, who also handled its production. Both versions of the single contain the B-side tracks "So Sorry" and "Cry".

== Music and lyrics ==
"Catallena"
A 19-second sample of "Catallena", featuring an interpolation of the Punjabi folk song "Jutti Meri" in the chorus.

"Catallena" combines contemporary pop with Italo disco and hi-NRG styles. The song is composed in the key of E minor with a tempo of 127 beats per minute, and runs for 3:13. Its chorus interpolates the Punjabi folk song "Jutti Meri". The track is instrumented by Nile Rodgers & Chic-esque guitars and makes use of a compressed synth bassline, which was compared to English rock band New Order's song "Blue Monday" (1983). "Catallena" also utilizes 1980s snares, Ghazal folk samples, and Bollywood-tinged overtones and beats in its production. Throughout the song, Orange Caramel sing using high-pitched vocals and melodious coos. Its orchestration was compared to the style of Swedish supergroup ABBA. During the song's lyrics, the group voice their fascination towards a charming "Catallena" woman in spite of being straight, singing, "She's so great, I've fallen for her / Even as a girl".

== Reception ==
"Catallena" was met with generally favourable reviews from music critics. Jakob Dorof, writing for Vice, praised the "mass" production of the track, which he labelled as "clever" and said made it "feel dang near handmade". Dorof further deemed Orange Caramel's "packaged positivity" as "a nightlight brighter than all the rest". He also wrote an article for Pitchfork, in which he called the song a "pretty fantastic pop" and regarded it as the group's best song. In PopMatters, Scott Interannte lauded the track for its "odd smashing of genres and styles"; writing for Billboard, Jeff Benjamin shared a similar view, citing the song as "a mishmash of peculiar sonic elements". Benjamin also noted the song's subject matter as a departure from "K-pop's heteronormative love lyrics". Reviewing for Dazed, Taylor Glasby regarded it as "the queen of the disco" and wrote that "the comical, twisted and wonderful 'Catallena' was a tune that welded itself to your brain." Labelling the song as "more of a novelty side-project", he felt that it "brimmed with confidence" and represented the group "turning a corner". Kim Do-heon from IZM gave a slightly positive review, rating the song three out of five stars, and wrote, "the song itself is okay, but its symbolism and implications are not light". Jessica Oak and Benjamin listed the track as one of the 20 best K-pop songs of 2014 for Billboard and deemed it as "possibly the oddest track of the year", but also "one of the year's most genius releases". The magazine ranked the track 20th on its list of the 100 best K-pop songs of the 2010s.

"Catallena" was a commercial success in South Korea. The song debuted and peaked at number six on the Gaon Digital Chart for the chart issue dated 9–15 March 2014. It maintained the position for four consecutive weeks before falling for the week of 12 April 2014. In addition, the song debuted at number three on the component Download Chart, selling 111,510 digital units in its first week of release. "Catallena" was the seventh best-performing song of March 2014 on the Digital Chart. Meanwhile, the physical single edition peaked at number five on the Gaon Album Chart. As of December 2014, "Catellena" has sold over 1,011,735 digital units in South Korea, becoming the 33rd best-selling single of 2014 in the country. Additionally, it became the 38th best-performing single on the Gaon Digital Chart for 2014, based on digital sales, streaming, and background music (track downloads).

== Music video ==
=== Background ===
The music video for "Catallena" was uploaded to Pledis Entertainment's YouTube channel on 12 March 2014, preceded by a 30-second teaser released on the same platform five days prior. The video was directed by the South Korean production company Digipedi, who had previously worked with several Korean artists, including Psy, IU and Epik High, among others. Arrici was credited as director of photography, while VIT served as the gaffer. The visuals are comical and "bizarre," depicting Orange Caramel dressed like pieces of sushi. Discussing the inspiration behind the music video, Digipedi stated that they came up with the concept while eating sushi at a restaurant, thinking that they would like to try sushi with orange caramel. The duo further elaborated: "[...] we thought it would be original to connect the story of the mermaid to a story about sushi. Since K-pop idols are usually depicted as princesses, we thought reversing that portrayal would make for a fascinating concept."

=== Synopsis and reception ===
The music video opens with a close-up of each member, before switching to show them posing together. In the following scene, the group are seen dancing on a table, wearing polka-dot styled outfits against a pastel-coloured backdrop. The visual then cuts to depict the members in mermaid costumes, following them being packaged into pieces of sushi. As the clip progresses, they are enticed by a drag queen octopus character known as "Catallena", played by South Korean comedian Kim Daesung, who is famous for cross-dressing on the show Gag Concert. In addition to the character, the video features a cameo from fellow comedian Jeong Tae-ho, who had worked with Kim in the Gag Concert sketch "Madam Jeong". The video ends with Orange Caramel coming to a restaurant, where they end up eating the sushi forms of themselves while crying.

Scott Interrante opined that the clip was "playful" and "quirky," writing that the "brightly-colored, cool-costumed video [...] brings out the group's weird sense of humor perfectly." Glasby labelled the video as "the cleverest "trick," writing, "Not once did it ever seem ridiculous; rather, it shone like a beacon of intelligence, creativity, humour and empathy in a tumultuous year." The music video was an instant hit on YouTube, achieving over 1 million views in 24 hours. Within five days, it had garnered over 2 million views. South Korean public broadcaster KBS banned the video from airing due to it portraying humans as sushi and under plastic wrapping, complaining that it "makes light of human life".

== Promotion ==
Prior to the song's release, Orange Caramel held a "surprise premiere" in Gangnam, Seoul on 11 March 2014, to discuss the single with their fans. Pledis Entertainment also released behind the scenes footage from the shooting of the album photos and music video. Following the release of the single, Orange Caramel appeared and performed on several South Korean music programs. The group gave their first televised live performance of "Catallena" on Mnet's M! Countdown on 13 March 2014. They subsequently appeared on MBC's Show! Music Core, SBS' Inkigayo and MBC Music's Show Champion on a weekly basis to perform it. During the performances, the group dressed as various food items, including sushi, french fries, and bibimbap. They also performed the song during WAPOP K-Dream Concert on 22 March 2014.

== Track listing ==
CD single / digital download
| No. | Title | Lyrics | Music | Length |
|---|---|---|---|---|
| 1. | "Catallena" (까탈레나) | Igy; Seo Yong-bae | Igy; Seo Yong-bae | 3:13 |
| 2. | "So Sorry" | Igy; Seo Yong-bae | Igy; Seo Yong-bae | 3:03 |
| 3. | "Cry" (미친 듯이 울었어; Michin Deusi Ureosseo) | Kim Tae-hyeon; E.G | Kim Tae-hyeon | 3:23 |
| Total length: | | | | 9:39 |

== Credits and personnel ==
Credits adapted from Naver Music.

- Igy – lyricist, composer, producer
- Seo Yong-bae – lyricist, composer, producer
- Orange Caramel – vocals

== Charts ==
=== Weekly charts ===
Weekly chart performance for "Catallena"
| Chart (2014) | Peak position |
|---|---|
| South Korea (Gaon Digital Chart) | 6 (Note: Based on digital sales, streaming, and background music (track downloads)) |
| South Korea (Gaon Album Chart) | 5 (Note: Based on physical sales) |
| South Korea (K-pop Hot 100) | 4 |
| US World Digital Songs (Billboard) | 11 |

=== Monthly charts ===
Monthly chart performance for "Catallena"
| Chart (March 2014) | Position |
|---|---|
| South Korea (Gaon Digital Chart) | 7 |
| South Korea (Gaon Album Chart) | 21 |

=== Year-end charts ===
2014 year-end chart performance for "Catallena"
| Chart (2014) | Position |
|---|---|
| South Korea (Gaon Digital Chart) | 33 |

== Release history ==
Release dates and formats for "Catallena"
| Country | Date | Format(s) | Label(s) | Ref. |
|---|---|---|---|---|
| Various | 12 March 2014 | Digital download; streaming | Pledis; Kakao M | |
| South Korea | 14 March 2014 | CD single | Pledis; Kakao M | |
