= Miss Back =

2020 South Korean television program

- Promotional poster
- Also known as: 미쓰백
- Miss Back
- Genre: Reality show
- Created by: Nam Seung-hyun; Ahn Dong-soo
- Developed by: MBN Entertainment; Mega Monster; Space Rabbit
- Written by: Ju Gi-ppeum; Kwon Ki-hoon; Jung Si-yoon; Kang Eun-ah; Chae Song-hee; Lee Hyun-jin; Kim So-hee; Choi Soo-jung; Moon Da-bin; Lee Chae-eun; Kim Yea-seul
- Directed by: Kim Ji-eun; You Ga-young; Kim Min-chang; Chu Eun-jung; Kim Young-ji; Oh Jung-myung
- Starring: Baek Ji-young
- Country of origin: South Korea
- Original language: Korean
- No. of seasons: 1
- No. of episodes: 16

Production
- Executive producers: Nam Sung-hyun (MBN/Space Rabbit); Ahn Dong-soo (Mega Monster)
- Camera setup: Multi-camera
- Running time: 1 hour, 20 minutes (including commercials)
- Production companies: Mega Monster; Space Rabbit

Original release
- Network: MBN; MBN Plus
- Release: October 8, 2020 – January 26, 2021

Miss Back (Korean: 미쓰백) is a South Korean television reality show created by Nam Seung-hyun and Ahn Dong-soo, developed and produced by Mega Monster and Space Rabbit for MBN. The show focuses on female idols who previously debuted with girl groups but have since faded from the limelight, aiming to provide them with another opportunity. It aired on MBN from October 8, 2020, to January 26, 2021.

== Participants ==
=== Hosts ===
- Baek Ji-young
- Song Eun-i
- Yoon Il-sang

=== Contestants ===
- Sera (9MUSES)
- Raina (After School)
- Soyul (Crayon Pop)
- Nada (WA$$UP)
- Gayoung (Stellar)
- Subin (a/k/a DALsooobin) (Dal Shabet)
- Jung Yu-jin (a/k/a Mail) (The Ark)
- Park So-yeon (T-ara) (featured in episodes 1-3 only)

== Discography ==
All credits for the show's discography are from Melon.

=== Part 1 ===
"MBN Miss Back Part.1"

Single by Jung Yu-jin
- Released: November 6, 2020
- Genre: Soundtrack; K-pop; Dance
- Label: Mega Monster; Kakao M
- Producer: Yoon Il-sang

No.	Title	Lyrics	Music	Artists	Length
1.	"Invisible Girl (투명소녀)"	Yoon Il-sang	Yoon Il-sang	Jung Yu-jin	3:12
2.	"Invisible Girl (투명소녀) (Instrumental)"		Yoon Il-sang	Jung Yu-jin	3:12

=== Part 2 ===
"MBN Miss Back Part.2"

Single by Raina and Nada
- Released: November 20, 2020
- Genre: Soundtrack; K-pop; Sentimental ballad
- Label: Mega Monster; Kakao M
- Producer: Yoon Il-sang

No.	Title	Lyrics	Music	Artists	Length
1.	"Piggyback Ride (어부바)"	Raina; Nada	Yoon Il-sang	Raina; Nada	4:24
2.	"Piggyback Ride (어부바) (Instrumental)"		Yoon Il-sang	Raina; Nada	4:24

=== Part 3 ===
"MBN Miss Back Part.3"

Single by Ryu Se-ra
- Released: December 9, 2020
- Genre: Soundtrack; K-pop; Trot
- Label: Mega Monster; Kakao M
- Producer: Yoon Il-sang

No.	Title	Lyrics	Music	Artists	Length
1.	"Up and Down (오르락내리락)"	Yoon Il-sang	Yoon Il-sang	Ryu Se-ra	4:18
2.	"Up and Down (오르락내리락) (Instrumental)"		Yoon Il-sang	Ryu Se-ra	4:18

=== Part 4 ===
"MBN Miss Back Part.4"

Single by Resonar (레소나) (Note: Members: Raina, Soyul, Nada)
- Released: December 17, 2020
- Genre: Soundtrack; K-pop; Dance
- Label: Mega Monster; Kakao M
- Producer: Armadillo (Kim Keun-woo)

No.	Title	Lyrics	Music	Artists	Length
1.	"Tantara (Note: Tantara is stylised in lower caps.)"	Armadillo (Kim Keun-woo); Lee Joon-hee	Armadillo (Kim Keun-woo); Rangga; Risso; Lee Seong-chan	Resonar (레소나) Raina, Soyul, Nada	3:03
2.	"Tantara (Instrumental)"		Armadillo (Kim Keun-woo); Rangga; Risso; Lee Seong-chan	Resonar (레소나) Raina, Soyul, Nada	3:03

=== Part 5 ===
MBN Miss Back Part.5

EP by various artists
- Released: December 23, 2020
- Studios: C-JeS Studio, Seoul, South Korea; NUPLAY Studio, Seoul, South Korea
- Genres: Soundtrack; K-pop; Dance; Sentimental ballad
- Length: 15:26
- Languages: Korean; English
- Labels: Mega Monster; Kakao M

No.	Title	Lyrics	Music	Artists	Length
1.	"Cat's Rain (고양이 비)"	Im Ji-soo (NUPLAY)	Im Ji-soo (NUPLAY); Shim In-yong	Ryu Se-ra; Jung Yu-jin	3:55
2.	"Winter Fantasy"	Big Sancho (Yummy Tone); Baek Ji-young; Ryu Se-ra; Raina; Soyul; Nada; Gayoung; Subin; Jung Yu-jin	Big Sancho (Yummy Tone); Jarry Potter (Yummy Tone)	Ryu Se-ra; Raina; Soyul; Nada; Gayoung; Subin; Jung Yu-jin	3:48
3.	"Cat's Rain (고양이 비) (Instrumental)"		Im Ji-soo (NUPLAY); Shim In-yong	Ryu Se-ra; Jung Yu-jin	3:55
4.	"Winter Fantasy (Instrumental)"		Big Sancho (Yummy Tone); Jarry Potter (Yummy Tone)	Ryu Se-ra; Raina; Soyul; Nada; Gayoung; Subin; Jung Yu-jin	3:48

=== Part 6 ===
"MBN Miss Back Part.6"

Single by Ryu Se-ra
- Released: December 30, 2020
- Genre: Soundtrack; K-pop; Sentimental ballad
- Label: Mega Monster; Kakao M
- Producer: Kim Won

No.	Title	Lyrics	Music	Artists	Length
1.	"Lean On Me (기대)"	Kim Won	Kim Won	Ryu Se-ra	4:15
2.	"Lean On Me (기대) (Instrumental)"		Kim Won	Ryu Se-ra	4:15

=== Part 7 ===
"MBN Miss Back Part.7"

Single by Raina and Junggigo
- Released: January 6, 2021
- Genre: Soundtrack; K-pop; Sentimental ballad
- Label: Mega Monster; Kakao M
- Producer: Honey Pot (Note: Honey Pot is a music production duo under JYP Entertainment, composed of Cho Hyun-kyung and Park Yong-woon.)

No.	Title	Lyrics	Music	Artists	Length
1.	"Can We Break Up? (헤어질 수 있을까)"	Honey Pot	Honey Pot	Raina; Junggigo	3:44
2.	"Can We Break Up? (헤어질 수 있을까) (Instrumental)"		Honey Pot	Raina; Junggigo	3:44

=== Part 8 ===
"MBN Miss Back Part.8"

Single by various artists
- Released: January 13, 2021
- Genre: Soundtrack; K-pop; Sentimental ballad
- Label: Mega Monster; Kakao M
- Producers: JMG Publishing; Yoon Il-sang

No.	Title	Lyrics	Music	Artists	Length
1.	"Sweet (달콤) (feat. Giant Pink)"	B-rock (JMG Publishing); J-lin (JMG Publishing); Park Yun-ha; Soyul	B-rock (JMG Publishing); J-lin (JMG Publishing); Enan (JMG Publishing)	Soyul; Bernard Park	3:27
2.	"Double Fantasy"	Yoon Il-sang	Yoon Il-sang	Gayoung; Hong Dae-kwang	4:19
3.	"Sweet (달콤) (Instrumental)"		B-rock (JMG Publishing); J-lin (JMG Publishing); Enan (JMG Publishing)	Soyul; Bernard Park	3:27
4.	"Double Fantasy (Instrumental)"		Yoon Il-sang	Gayoung; Hong Dae-kwang	4:19

=== Part 9 ===
MBN Miss Back Part.9

EP by various artists
- Released: January 27, 2021
- Studios: C-JeS Studio, Seoul, South Korea; 142 Music Studio, Seoul, South Korea
- Genres: Soundtrack; K-pop; Dance
- Length: 15:58
- Languages: Korean; English
- Labels: Mega Monster; Kakao M
- Producers: Jang Sae-jung (exec.); Park Seul-gi; Lee Jin-kyung; Keum Sung-sik; Yoon Il-sang

No.	Title	Lyrics	Music	Artists	Length
1.	"Finale"	Park Seul-gi; Lee Jin-kyung; Keum Sung-sik	Park Seul-gi; Lee Jin-kyung	Ryu Se-ra; Raina; Soyul; Nada; Gayoung; Subin; Jung Yu-jin	3:33
2.	"We Are The One"	Yoon Il-sang	Yoon Il-sang	Ryu Se-ra; Raina; Soyul; Nada; Gayoung; Subin; Jung Yu-jin	3:56
3.	"Finale (Instrumental)"		Park Seul-gi; Lee Jin-kyung	Ryu Se-ra; Jung Yu-jin	3:33
4.	"We Are The One (Instrumental)"		Yoon Il-sang	Ryu Se-ra; Raina; Soyul; Nada; Gayoung; Subin; Jung Yu-jin	3:56

=== Part 10 ===
"MBN Miss Back Part.10"

Single by DALsooobin
- Released: January 29, 2021
- Genre: Soundtrack; K-pop; Contemporary R&B; Soul
- Label: Mega Monster; Kakao M
- Producer: Yummy Tone

No.	Title	Lyrics	Music	Artists	Length
1.	"Sign"	Big Sancho (Yummy Tone); Jarry Potter (Yummy Tone)	Big Sancho (Yummy Tone); Jarry Potter (Yummy Tone)	DALsooobin	3:25
2.	"Sign (Instrumental)"		Big Sancho (Yummy Tone); Jarry Potter (Yummy Tone)	DALsooobin	3:25
