= Lipstick (Orange Caramel album) =

Studio album by Orange Caramel
- Released: September 12, 2012 (South Korea)
- Recorded: 2010–2012
- Genre: Electropop; dance
- Length: 45:28
- Label: Pledis; LOEN

Orange Caramel albums chronology
The Second Mini Album (2010)	Lipstick (2012)	Orange Caramel (2013)

Singles from Lipstick
- 1. "Lipstick" Released: September 12, 2012

Orange Caramel Korean singles chronology
Shanghai Romance (2011)	Lipstick (2012)	Catallena (2014)

Lipstick is the debut studio album by South Korean girl group After School sub-unit Orange Caramel. It was released on September 12, 2012 and contains 13 songs (including a new recording of their song "Bangkok City".) The title track "Lipstick" samples "The Streets of Cairo", a song notably sampled on Kesha's "Take It Off", and was used as the album's lead single. The album includes previous hits such as "Magic Girl", "A-ing" and "Shanghai Romance" and each member also has their own solo song.

== Background ==
Early May 2012, Pledis Entertainment's managing director announced that Orange Caramel will be releasing their first full-length album later that year and that the album demo is "nearly finalized". Several months later, in September, Pledis revealed three photo teasers through their official Twitter page of each member. The following day, the track list was revealed and a special teaser was released on September 7, 2012. Two days later, another three individual member photo teasers were revealed through Pledis's Twitter page and a music video teaser was posted the following day, with the final music video being released at 12PM Kst on September 12, 2012 along with the album being released through Korean online music stores and iTunes worldwide.

== Promotion ==
Promotion for "Lipstick" began on Mnet's M! Countdown on September 13, 2012 and they also performed a shortened version of "Milkshake" as a part of their special comeback stage. Orange Caramel continued to promote the song on various Korean music shows such as Music Bank, Music Core, Inkigayo and Show Champion.

== Chart performance ==
The title track, "Lipstick", was a commercial success having managed to stay in the Top 10 singles on the Gaon Digital Chart and Korea K-Pop Hot 100 for over a month. To date, the title track has been downloaded more than one million times in South Korea according to the Gaon Download Chart. The album itself charted well, peaking at number 3 on the Gaon Weekly Album Chart, number 9 on the Gaon Monthly Album Chart and it also charted on Japan's Oricon Weekly Album chart at number 92, selling 2,187 copies.

== Track listing ==
No.	Title	Lyrics	Music	Length
1.	"Bubble Bath"	Kim Eana	East4A	3:42
2.	"Milkshake" (밀크쉐이크)	Team M49	Daishi Dance; Blacc Hole; DJ R2	3:35
3.	"Lipstick" (립스틱)	Igi; Seo Yongbae	Igi; Seo Yongbae	3:21
4.	"A~ing♡" (아잉♡)	Wheesung	Jo Yeongsu	3:28
5.	"Magic Girl" (마법소녀; Mabeopsonyeo)	Wheesung	Jo Yeongsu	3:09
6.	"Not Yet..." (아직…; Ajik...) (Raina solo)	Raina	Jang Jae-in; Yu Hyeonsang; Park Sehyeon	3:29
7.	"Superwoman" (Raina solo featuring S.Coups of Seventeen)	Yu Chiyeon	Yu Chiyeon	3:20
8.	"One Love"	Jeongun; Rado	Jeongun; Rado	3:22
9.	"Shanghai Romance" (샹하이 로맨스)	Space Big Star	Jo Yeongsu	3:46
10.	"Clara's Dream" (클라라의 꿈; Keullaraui Kkum) (Lizzy solo)	Jeong Yunhwa	Park Sangheon	3:58
11.	"Close Your Eyes" (눈을 감아; Nuneul Gama) (Nana solo)	Park Sangheon; Lee Yera	Park Sangheon	4:09
12.	"Love Does Not Wait" (사랑을 미룰 순 없나요; Sarangeul Irul Sun Eopsnayo) (Raina solo)	Oh Seunghun	Park Deoksang	3:25
13.	"Bangkok City" (방콕시티) (2012 New Recording)	Won Tae-yeon	Daniel Barkman; Jorgen Ringqvist	2:50
Total length:				45:28

== Charts ==
=== Album charts ===
Country	Chart	Peak position
South Korea	Gaon Album Chart (weekly)	3
South Korea	Gaon Album Chart (monthly)	9
Japan	Oricon Albums Chart (weekly)	92

=== Sales ===
Chart	Sales
South Korea Gaon physical sales	15,324
Japan Oricon physical sales	2,187
Total	17,511

== Release history ==
Country	Date	Format	Label
South Korea	September 12, 2012	Digital download	Pledis Entertainment; LOEN Entertainment
Worldwide	September 12, 2012	Digital download	Pledis Entertainment; LOEN Entertainment
South Korea	September 14, 2012	CD	Pledis Entertainment; LOEN Entertainment
Japan	September 24, 2012	CD	Avex Marketing
