= Wassup (group) =

South Korean girl group

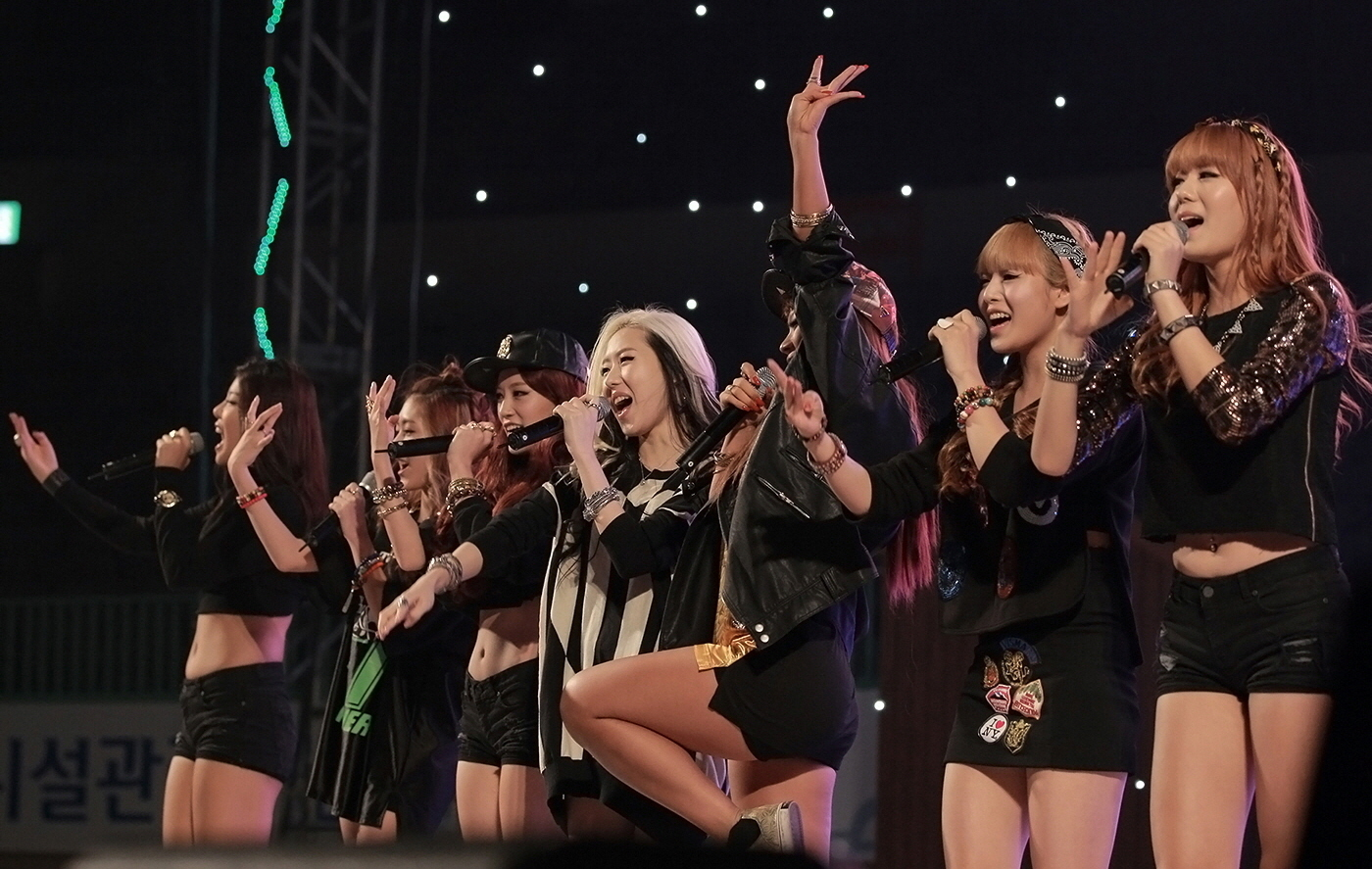
- From left to right: Dain, Woojoo, Nari, Jinju, Nada, Sujin, Jiae

Background information
- Origin: Seoul, South Korea
- Genres: K-pop; hip hop; dance
- Years active: 2013–2019
- Labels: Mafia; Sony
- Past members: Nada; Jinju; Dain; Nari; Jiae; Sujin; Woojoo

Wassup (Korean: 와썹, stylised as WA$$UP) was a South Korean girl group formed by Mafia Records and Sony Music. The group consisted of 7 members: Nada, Jinju, Dain, Nari, Jiae, Sujin, Woojoo. They debuted on August 7, 2013, with the single, "Wassup".

== History ==
=== 2013: "Hotter Than A Summer" and Nom Nom Nom ===
On August 3, 2013, Sony Music announced a girl group which had been training for three years, with a dancehall genre of music and the dance of twerking. Sony Music said, "Wassup will be different from other girl groups. They aim to spread hip hop music through their numerous activities." On August 7, the group released their debut music video "Wassup". They later held their debut performance on Show Champion. On September 4, the group released the music video for "Hotter Than A Summer", a reggae track composed by Red Roc and written by YE YO.

On November 20, 2013, the group released their first EP, Nom Nom Nom, alongside a music video for the lead single of the same name. They had their debut performance of the song the same day. The Nom Nom Nom EP entered the Gaon Korean album charts at number 29.

=== 2014-2016: "Fire", "Shut Up U" and "Stupid Liar" ===
On June 9, 2014, Wassup released a music video for the single "Fire". The video was made to celebrate the 2014 FIFA World Cup hosted in Brazil. The video featured the band playing football in Brazilian and South Korean jerseys. Wassup's Showtime EP entered the Gaon Korean album chart at number 55. On December 8, 2014, they released a music video for "Shut Up U".

On January 26, 2015, the group released a video for "Stupid Liar". On December 25, 2015, the group released a Christmas special clip to the song 안아줘, from their EP, Showtime.

On November 27, 2015, Woojoo sprained her ankle while practicing dance moves causing the group's next comeback to be delayed. On February 3, 2016, Wassup released a collaborative single with Madtown and Rooftop House Studio, titled "Do You Know How I Feel" featuring Jooyi, a former member of Rania.

=== 2017: Nada, Dain & Jinju's departure and ColorTV ===
On February 1, 2017, it was announced that Nada had officially left the group following a dispute with the company, after her earnings from participating in "Unpretty Rapstar" were instead taken by the company and applied to her pre-debut debt. After Nada asked the company to terminate her contract, they refused, resulting in Nada filing a lawsuit to forcibly terminate her contract. The company announced that the group would be coming back as a quartet composed of Nari, Jiae, Woojoo and Sujin, but did not make any statement regarding Dain and Jinju, leading to speculation that they had left as well. On February 2, it was announced that Dain and Jinju had also filed lawsuits to terminate their contracts, to which the company revealed that the group as a whole were still 500 million won in pre-debut debt.

On March 31, Wassup pre-released the track "Dominant Woman" a single part of their third mini-album titled ColorTV set to be released, on April 13, 2017.

On September 12, it was announced Nari and Jiae will be participating on The Unit. Jiae did not pass the audition stage, while Nari did, and was eliminated on episode 13 of the show, after placing 21st.

=== 2019: Disbandment ===
On February 10, 2019, it was announced by Mafia Records that Wassup had disbanded following terminations of contract.

== Solo activities ==
On August 9, 2013, main rapper Nada released the music video for her first official solo song "Bang Bang". On September 24, 2013, Sony Music released a music video for rookie rapper KK's song, 'Boys Be', featuring all Wassup members and Jewelry's Semi. On September 26, 2013, a music video for Demion featuring Wassup's Woojoo was released. On May 18, 2014, Nada made an appearance in the song "Domperii" by Pharaoh, along with Red Roc.

In 2014, Sujin participated in the drama Angel's Revenge as Lee Hye-sook. On May 24, 2014, Nada and Nari participated in the song "We Are The Champs" by the Brazilian group Champs from JS Entertainment.

In 2015 Sujin made a special participation on 70th anniversary of the liberation of Korea and the special plan one-act theater "Great story - sorry for the ugliness of the two weeks", and participated in the program Police 2015. In March 2015, Nada was featured on The GITA's single "Pendulum". In September 2015, Wa$$up was featured on TĀLĀ & MssingNo's single "Tell Me".

And in 2016 Sujin participated in the Legend Hero Samgugjeon series as Lina, a great national idol. Still in 2016, Sujin starred in the music video for "Geudaeege" (에게 에게) by singer Mocha. On February 2, 2016, Nada released her first mixtape Homework. In July 2016, she participated in Unpretty Rapstar 3, losing out to Giant Pink in the finals. In December 2016 NaDa released her first digital single "Seorae Village" (마을 마을), her latest release as a member of the group.

In 2017 Sujin participated in dramas The Happy Loner as Park Yeon-hee, Introverted Boss as Mi Bae, and Lingerie Girls’ Generation as Kim Eon-Joo. On March 6, 2017, Nari contributed to the song "Sorry cause I’m young", on 14th album from Yoo Se-yoon. On August 7, 2017, Nari was featured at ZSUN debut single "AH YAH SO NICE".

On January 20, 2018, Sujin is featured in episode 7 of drama Hwayugi, as Mermaid.

On February 11, 2022, main vocalist Jiae announced a Makestar project to fund her debut solo album. On October 8, 2022, Jiae released her debut solo album, Love is Love.

== Members ==
=== Former ===
- Jinju (진주)
- Dain (다인)
- Nada (나다)
- Nari (나리)
- Jiae (지애)
- Sujin (수진)
- Woojoo (우주)

== Discography ==
=== Extended plays ===
Title	Album details	Peak chart positions	Sales
Title	Album details	KOR	Sales
Nom Nom Nom	Released: November 20, 2013; Label: Mafia Records, Sony Music Korea; Formats: CD, digital download; Track listing: 1. Nom Nom Nom (놈놈놈); 2. WA$$UP; 3. Galaxy (갤럭시); 4. Bang Bang (Nada Solo); 5. Hotter Than A Summer	29	KOR: 638+
Showtime	Released: November 24, 2014; Label: Mafia Records, Sony Music Korea; Formats: CD, digital download; Track listing: 1. Showtime; 2. Shut Up U (시끄러워U); 3. Stupid Liar (feat. NiiHWA of 413); 4. What You Looking At? (어딜 쳐다 봐) (Nada Solo); 5. Hug Me (안아줘)	55	—N/a
Color TV	Released: April 13, 2017; Label: Mafia Records, Sony Music Korea; Formats: CD, digital download; Track listing: 1. Color TV (칼라 TV); 2. Lover; 3. Lalala; 4. I'm Beautiful (아름다워)	59	—N/a

=== Singles ===
Title	Year	Peak chart positions	Album
Title	Year	KOR	Album
"Wassup"	2013	175	Nom Nom Nom
"Bang Bang" (Nada solo)	2013	—	Nom Nom Nom
"Hotter Than A Summer"	2013	172	Nom Nom Nom
"Nom Nom Nom" (놈놈놈)	2013	115	Nom Nom Nom
"La Pam Pam Pa" (라팜팜파)	2013	162	Non-album singles
"Jingle Bell" (징글벨)	2013	—	Non-album singles
"Fire" feat. M.TySON	2014	—	Non-album singles
"Shut Up U" (시끄러워U)	2014	—	Showtime
"Stupid Liar" feat. NiiHWA	2015	—	Showtime
"Do You Know My Heart" (내 맘을 아냐고) with Madtown feat. Jooyi	2016	—	Non-album singles
"Dominant Woman"	2017	—	Non-album singles
"Color TV"	2017	—	Color TV
"—" denotes releases that did not chart or were not released in that region.
