= Orange Caramel =

South Korean girl group, sub-unit of After School (2010-2016)

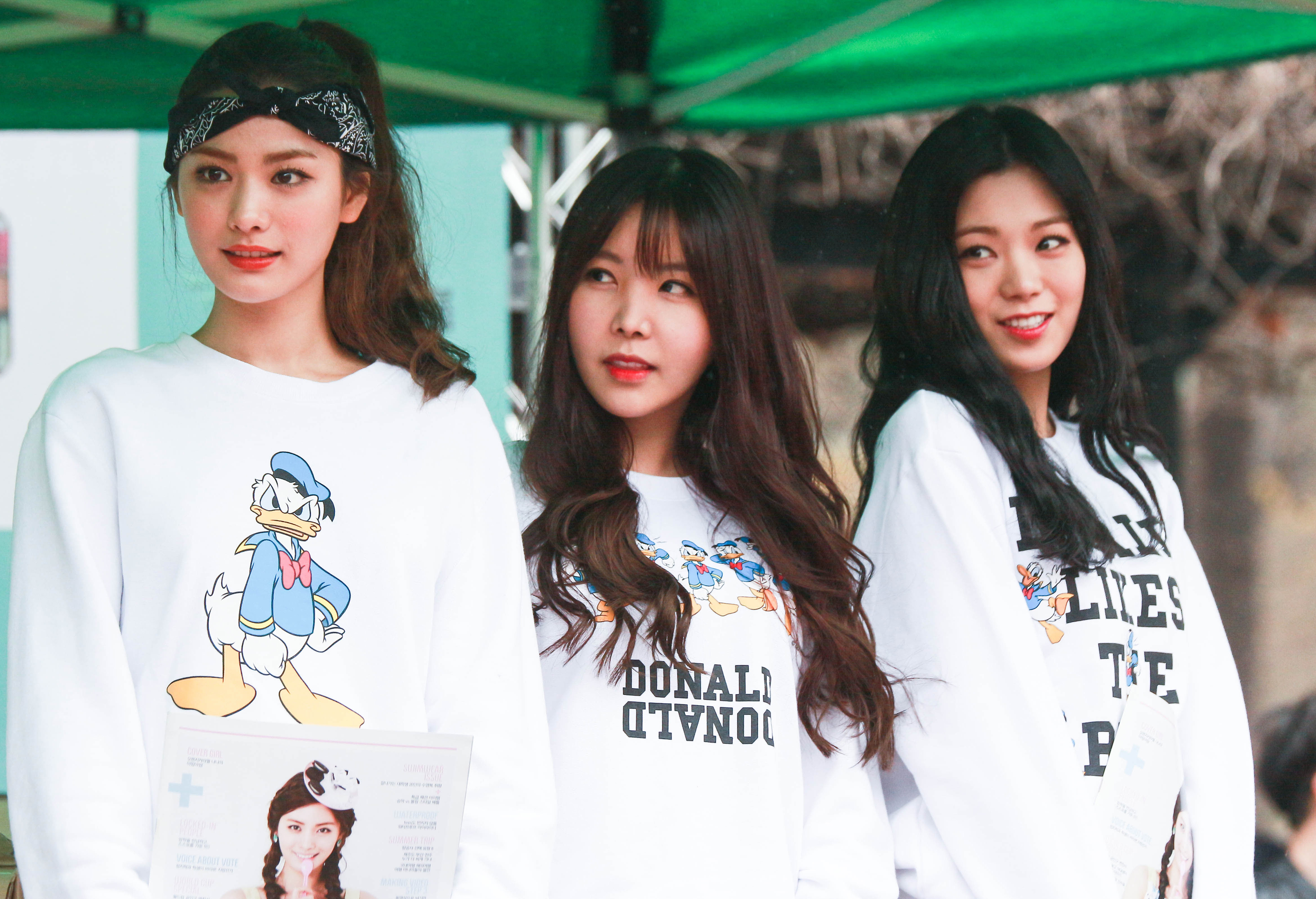
- Orange Caramel in 2015; From left to right: Nana, Raina, Lizzy

Background information
- Origin: Seoul, South Korea
- Genre: K-pop
- Years active: 2010–2016
- Labels: Pledis; Avex Trax (Japan); Gold Typhoon (China); Universal (Philippines)
- Spinoff of: After School
- Members: Raina; Nana; Lizzy
- Website: www.pledis.co.kr/ko/artist/detail/orangecaramel

Orange Caramel (Korean: 오렌지 캬라멜) was the first subgroup of South Korean girl group After School. The subgroup was formed in 2010 with the third generation After School members Nana, Raina, and Lizzy.

With no formal announcement of disbandment made, as of September 2024, no members remain under the management of Pledis Entertainment.

== History ==
=== 2010: Debut and two mini albums ===
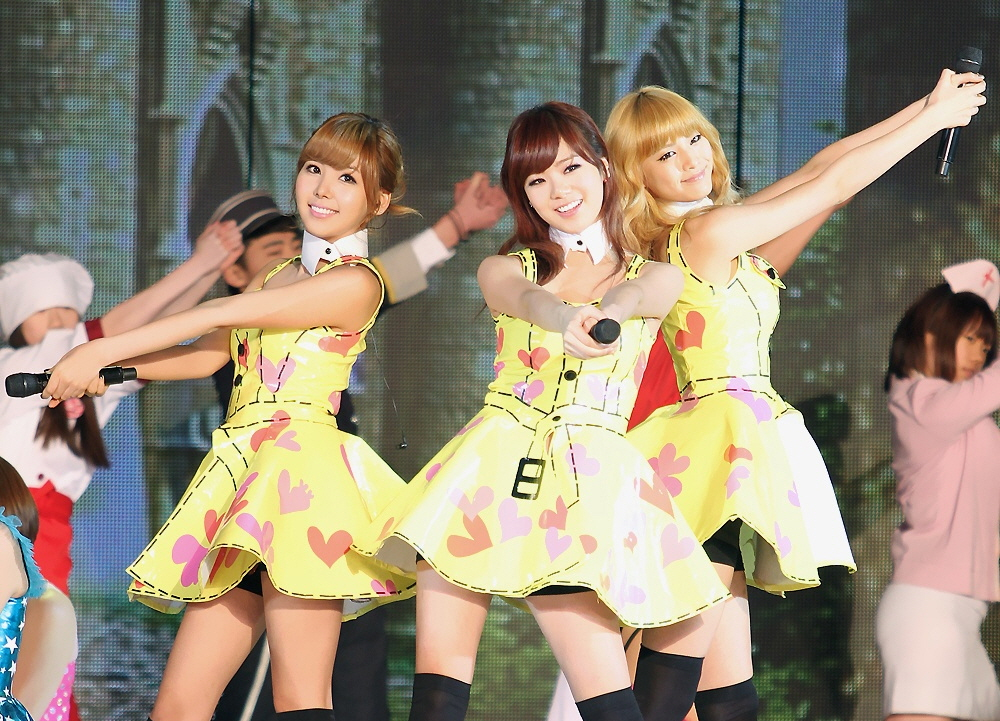
Orange Caramel in 2010

Orange Caramel debuted on June 16, 2010, with the single "Magic Girl". Their debut mini-album, The First Mini Album was released on June 21, 2010. The album was a commercial success, peaking at No. 2 on the Gaon Chart with the lead single "Magic Girl" peaking at No. 18. "Magic Girl" was a domestic hit and became famous for its choreography and outfits featuring large bows, with the song's concept proving popular as it was often parodied on variety shows throughout 2010. The mini-album was also released in Taiwan, where a Mandarin version of "The Day You Went Away", a cover from Cyndi Wang, originally by M2M, was also included. Both versions of the album included Raina's R&B solo, "Love Does Not Wait" (사랑을 미룰 순 없나요).

On November 18, 2010, The Second Mini Album was released with the title track "A-ing". The music video for "A-ing" had a fairy tale witches concept. The album peaked at No. 10 on the Gaon Chart and the lead single, "A-ing", peaked at No. 5. The second single released from the album, a solo by Raina titled "Not Yet..." (아직...), peaked at No. 42. The album also includes the song "One Love" and a Korean version of "The Day You Went Away" (이곳에 서서).

=== 2011: Bangkok City and Shanghai Romance ===
On March 30, "Bangkok City" was released as part of the group's "One Asia" project. The single peaked at No. 3 on the Gaon Chart, thus making it the group's most successful single to date. Orange Caramel continued the "One Asia" project with the release of "Shanghai Romance" on October 13, which peaked at No. 8. The song's lyrics were written by Kim Hee-chul of Super Junior. The single had two B-sides: "Close Your Eyes" (눈을 감아), a solo by Nana, and the Mandarin version of "The Day You Went Away". A Japanese version of "Shanghai Romance" was later released as a bonus track on After School's debut Japanese album, Playgirlz.

=== 2012–2013: Japanese debut and Lipstick ===
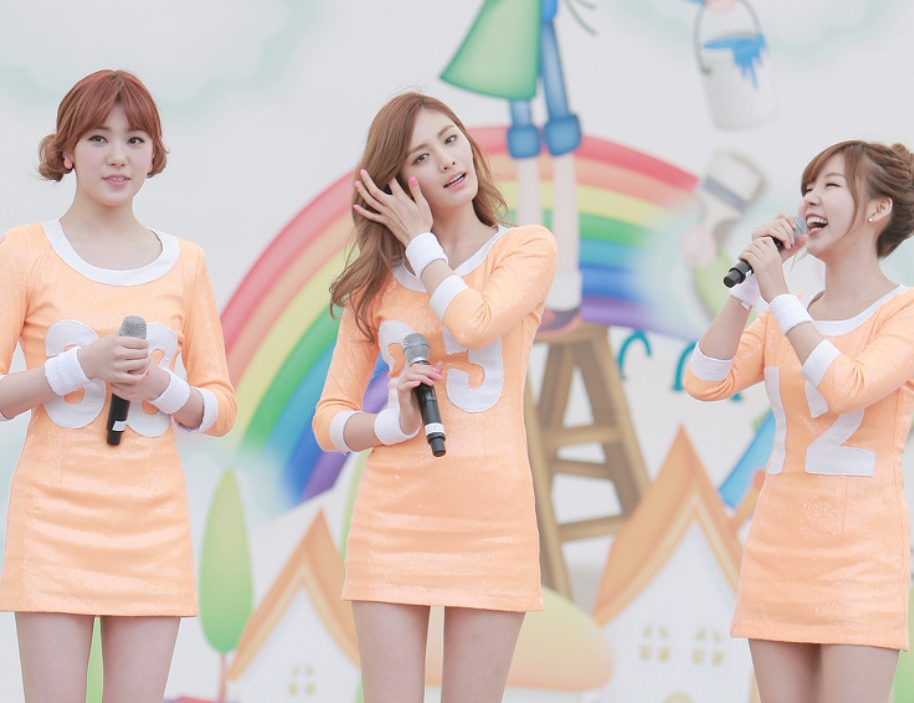
Orange Caramel in 2013

Orange Caramel debuted in Japan on September 5, 2012, with a cover of 1970s pop group Candies song "My Sweet Devil". They returned to Korea and released their first studio album, Lipstick on September 12. On October 23, 2012, Orange Caramel released the single "Lipstick DJ Remix". It consisted of two remixes of "Lipstick" by DJs Vodge Diper and Hanmin. Vodge Diper's remix was subsequently used in their live TV performances.

The group's first Japanese studio album, Orange Caramel, was released on March 13, 2013. It included their previous Japanese singles and Japanese versions of their Korean singles, as well as some new songs.

On May 9, 2013, Orange Caramel released a collaboration with indie band 10cm. The single is a remake of 10 cm's "Hug Me" (안아줘요) and is part of LOEN Entertainment's "Re;code" project. In July 2013, Orange Caramel released the book Youth Travel (청춘 여행), which contains short essays and photos of the group visiting Seoul and Jeonju.

=== 2014: Catallena and My Copycat ===
Orange Caramel's third single, "Catallena" was released on March 12. In the music video, the group appear as mermaids before turning into different types of sushi. The song has a Bollywood-inspired disco beat and samples a Punjabi wedding folk song. The single peaked at No. 5 on Gaon's album chart and No. 6 on the digital chart, as well as No. 4 on Billboard's K-Pop Hot 100. The group's performances of the song went viral on social media sites due to the "screaming" during the introduction of the song. Orange Caramel released a promotional single, "Abing Abing", on May 20. The song was used to promote Baskin Robbins' new line of ice cream bingsoo, or patbingsu, a Korean shaved ice dessert. At the end of 2014, it was number 12 on Billboard's list of the 20 best K-pop songs of the year.

On August 18, Orange Caramel's fourth single, "My Copycat" (나처럼 해봐요; Nacheoreom Haebwayo, lit. "Do it Like Me") was released. The theme of the music video is based on Where's Waldo? and prompts viewers to find the Orange Caramel members in different scenes as well as spot the differences between similar side-by-side shots. It was directed by video production team duo Digipedi who had previously worked with the group on "Catallena" and "Lipstick". The single peaked at No. 8 on Gaon's album chart and No. 19 on the digital chart. A music video for the B-side track "The Gangnam Avenue" (강남거리) was released on September 3. Later that month, the group released their first soundtrack single, "Tonight" for the television series It's Okay, That's Love.

=== 2015–2019: Solo endeavours and Lizzy & Raina's departures ===
Since 2015, both After School and Orange Caramel promotions slowed down whilst members focus on individual activities. What became Orange Caramel's final concert appearance together was on April 15, 2016, at the SBS Cultwo Show Legend Concert held at the Olympic Hall; interviews at the concert revealed that they had been working on music. Raina has embarked on a solo music career, whilst Lizzy and Nana focused more on acting. On May 1, 2018, Pledis Entertainment announced that Lizzy had left After School, due to the expiration of her contract. However, they later clarified that she had not left Orange Caramel, and that if the opportunity were to arise in the future, the sub-unit would still release songs as three members. On December 27, 2019, Raina left Pledis without any statement concerning her membership with Orange Caramel.

== Discography ==
Orange Caramel discography
- Studio albums: 2
- Extended plays: 2
- Singles: 14
- Single albums: 4

=== Studio albums ===
Title	Album details	Peak chart positions		Sales
Title	Album details	KOR	JPN	Sales
Lipstick	Released: September 12, 2012 (KOR); Label: Pledis Entertainment; Format: CD, digital download	3	92	KOR: 15,324; JPN: 2,187
Orange Caramel	Released: March 13, 2013 (JPN); Label: Avex Trax; Format: CD, digital download	—	21	JPN: 7,732
"—" denotes releases that did not chart or were not released in that region.

=== Extended plays ===
Title	Album details	Peak chart positions	Sales
Title	Album details	KOR	Sales
The First Mini Album	Released: June 17, 2010 (KOR); Label: Pledis Entertainment; Format: CD, digital download	2	KOR: 3,989
The Second Mini Album	Release: November 18, 2010 (KOR); Label: Pledis Entertainment; Format: CD, digital download	10	KOR: 4,986

=== Single albums ===
Title	Album details	Peak chart positions	Sales
Title	Album details	KOR	Sales
Bangkok City	Released: March 21, 2011; Label: Pledis Entertainment; Format: CD, digital download	3	KOR: 7,703
Shanghai Romance	Released: October 13, 2011; Label: Pledis Entertainment; Format: CD, digital download	6	KOR: 8,084
Catallena	Released: March 12, 2014; Label: Pledis Entertainment; Format: CD, digital download	5	KOR: 8,508
My Copycat	Released: August 18, 2014; Label: Pledis Entertainment; Format: CD, digital download	8	KOR: 6,212

=== Singles ===
Title	Year	Peak chart positions					Sales (Note: Sales figures for tracks are based on digital downloads, except noted.)	Album
Title	Year	KOR		JPN		US World	Sales	Album
Title	Year	Gaon	Hot	Oricon	Hot	US World	Sales	Album
"Magic Girl" (마법소녀)	2010	18	—	—	—	—	KOR: 1,488,907	The First Mini Album
"A-ing" (아잉)	2010	5	—	—	—	—	KOR: 946,156	The Second Mini Album
"Bangkok City" (방콕시티)	2011	3	—	—	—	—	KOR: 1,789,391	Bangkok City
"Shanghai Romance" (샹하이 로맨스)	2011	8	7	—	—	—	KOR: 1,642,257	Shanghai Romance
"Funny Hunny"	2011	8	10	—	—	—	KOR: 1,066,858	Non-album single
"Yasashii Akuma" (やさしい悪魔)	2012	—	—	10	23	—	JPN: 13,739 (Phy.)	Orange Caramel
"Lipstick" (립스틱)	2012	5	2	—	—	—	KOR: 1,713,196	Lipstick
"Lipstick / Lamu no Love Song" (ラムのラブソング)	2012	—	—	12	96	—	JPN: 12,235 (Phy.)	Orange Caramel
"Dashing Through the Snow in High Heels" (흰눈 사이로 하이힐 타고) (feat. NU'EST)	2012	25	16	—	—	—	KOR: 203,168	Non-album single
"Cookies, Cream & Mint" (クッキークリーム&ミン)	2013	—	—	—	—	—		Orange Caramel
"Hug Song" (안아줘요) (with 10cm)	2013	14	12	—	—	—	KOR: 291,461	Non-album single
"Catallena" (까탈레나)	2014	6	4	—	—	11	KOR: 1,011,735	Catellena
"Abing Abing" (아빙아빙)	2014	18	19	—	—	—	KOR: 214,213	Non-album single
"My Copycat" (나처럼 해봐요)	2014	19	—	—	—	6	KOR: 289,899	My Copycat
"—" denotes releases that did not chart or were not released in that region.

=== Soundtrack appearances ===
Title	Year	Peak chart positions	Sales	Album
Title	Year	KOR	Sales	Album
"Tonight"	2014	88 (Note: "Tonight" peaked at number 88 on the domestic Gaon Digital Chart.)	KOR: 21,945	It's Okay, That's Love

=== Other charted songs ===
Title	Year	Peak chart positions		Album
Title	Year	KOR Gaon	KOR Hot	Album
"Love Does Not Wait" (사랑을 미룰 순 없나요)	2010	192	—	The First Mini Album
"Not Yet..." (아직...)	2010	74	—	The Second Mini Album
"Close Your Eyes" (눈을 감아)	2011	145	—	Lipstick
"Milkshake"	2012	198	—	Lipstick
"So Sorry"	2014	106	52	Catellena
"Cry" (미친 듯이 울었어)	2014	118	54	Catellena
"—" denotes releases that did not chart or were not released in that region.

=== Other appearances ===
Title	Year	Album
"How Are You" (어떤가요)	2011	Happy Pledis 2012: Love Letter
"Jagiya" (자기야)	2014	Immortal Songs: Singing the Legend (Family Special)
"Ulleungdo Twist" (울릉도 트위스트) (with Jo Se-ho)	2014	Immortal Songs: Singing the Legend (Summer Special Vol. 1)
"Na Eotteokhae" (나 어떡해)	2014	Immortal Songs: Singing the Legend (Summer Special Vol. 2)

=== Music videos ===
List of music videos, showing year released with directors
Title	Year	Director(s)	Ref.
Korean
"Magic Girl"	2010	Unknown	
"A~ing♡"	2010	Unknown	
"Bangkok City"	2011	Lee Il-Hwan	
"Shanghai Romance"	2011	Song Won-young	
"Funny Hunny"	2011	Unknown	
"Funny Hunny" (Studio ver.)	2011	I'mpulse mediaworks	
"Lipstick"	2012	Digipedi	
"Catallena"	2014	Digipedi	
"Abing Abing"	2014	Go Won-seok	
"My Copycat"	2014	Digipedi	
"The Gangnam Avenue"	2014	Digipedi	
Japanese
"My Sweet Devil"	2012	Wataru Saito	
"Lipstick"	2012	Digipedi	
"Lamu no Love Song"	2012	Wataru Saito	
"Cookies, Cream & Mint"	2013	Wataru Saito	

== Awards and nominations ==
Seoul Music Awards

Year	Nominee / work	Award	Result
2012	Orange Caramel	Bonsang Award	Nominated
2012	Orange Caramel	Popularity Award	Nominated
2013	"Lipstick"	Bonsang Award	Nominated
2013	"Lipstick"	Popularity Award	Nominated

Melon Music Awards

Year	Nominee / work	Award	Result
2014	"Catallena"	Best Song	Nominated

SBS MTV Best of the Best

Year	Nominee / work	Award	Result
2012	"Lipstick"	Best Comic Video	Won
2012	Orange Caramel	Best Rival (vs Secret)	Nominated

Korean Visual Arts Festival

Year	Nominee / work	Award	Result
2010	Orange Caramel	Photogenic Award	Won

MTN Broadcast Advertising Award Ceremony

Year	Nominee / work	Award	Result
2014	Orange Caramel	The Women CM Star Award	Won
