= Nada (South Korean musician) =

South Korean rapper, singer, dancer and model

- 나다
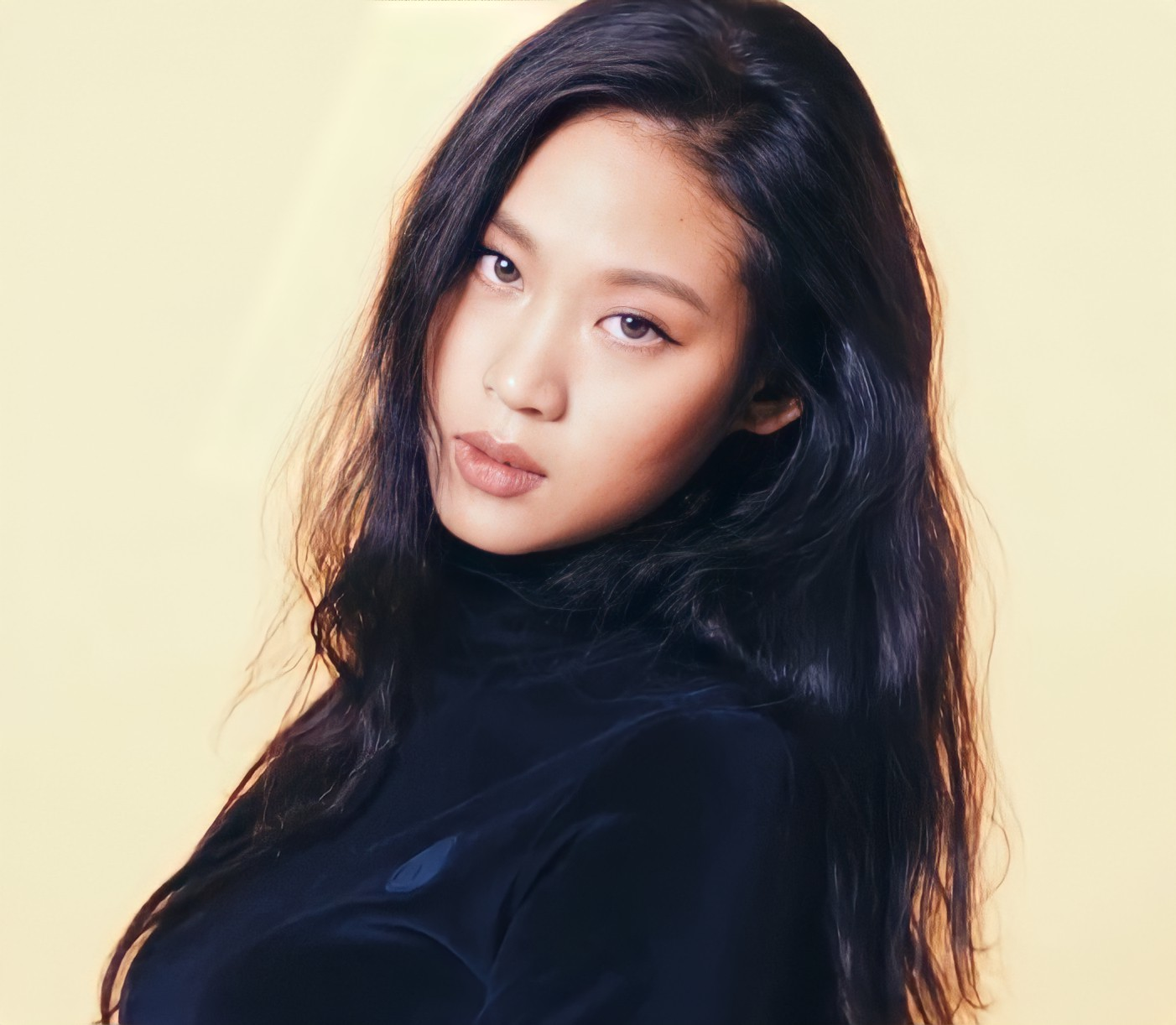
- Nada for Marie Claire Korea in 2016
- Born: Yoon Ye-jin; May 24, 1991 (age 35); Seoul, South Korea
- Education: Sunhwa Arts School
- Occupations: Rapper; singer
- Musical career
- Genre: K-pop
- Instrument: Vocals
- Years active: 2013–present
- Labels: Mafia Records (2013–2017); Ground Zero (2017–2020); World Star Entertainment (2020–present)

Yoon Ye-jin (Hangul: 윤예진; born May 24, 1991), known professionally as Nada (나다), is a South Korean rapper and singer. She is a former member of the girl group Wassup. Nada made her debut as a soloist on December 22, 2016, with the digital single "Seorae Village".

== Personal life ==
Nada was born as Yoon Ye-ji in Seoul, South Korea. She studied at Sunhwa Arts School.

== Career ==
=== 2013–2016: Debut with Wassup and solo activities ===
In 2013, Nada become a member of the girl group Wassup under Mafia Records, she was the main rapper of the group. On August 9, 2013, Nada released her first solo song "Bang Bang" as a member of Wassup, the song was also produced by her. on May 18, 2014, Nada was featured in Pharaoh's song "Domperii" with Red Roc. Nada participated in Mnet's rap competition TV show, Show Me the Money 3 as a contestant until round 3, On February 2, 2016, Nada released her 1st mixtape Homework. In July 2016, Nada become a contestant in Mnet's female rapper competition show Unpretty Rapstar 3, she lost out to Giant Pink in the finals with 131 votes.

On October 28, 2016, Nada was chosen as the new model for fitness brand Reebok korea's women's campaign '#PERFECTNEVER'. The campaign supports "women who are endlessly challenged by themselves, rejecting the limits of perfection". November 3, Mafia Records announced that Nada will be releasing a solo single but the company has yet to specify a specific release date. on December 18, the teaser image for her solo single "Seorae Village" was released, the teaser of the music video was released on December 21. the song along with its music video was released on December 22.

=== 2017–2019: Leaving Wassup, It's Okay to Be a Little Crazy and collaboration ===
On February 1, 2017, it was announced that Nada had officially left Wassup after a dispute with the Mafia Records. then Nada signed a contract with Ground Zero and on September 27, she made her first comeback after leaving Wassup, with the single "Trippin". On October 28, Nada was the cast member of SBS's variety show It's Okay to Be a Little Crazy,

On January 12, 2018, Nada released "Ride", featuring Sumin. On May 30, 2018, Nada and Mina Myoung of 1MILLION Dance Studio collaborate on a reality show about music called Never Sleep, it premiered on mobile contents service app oksusu on June 5. The two also collaborate on a digital single called MND Project, released on June 15, 2018. With the song "Dozer". The music video of "Dozer" was directed by TW from the company OVIS and the music video was also produced by OVIS theirself. in August 2019, the Brazilian girl group EVE released the single "Oy Mama", which featured Nada.

=== 2020–present: "My Body" and Miss Back ===
On April 17, 2020, World Star Entertainment announced that Nada would make her first comeback in 2 years. the teaser image of her comeback with the song "My Body" was released on June 19, the song was released along with its music video on June 25. Nada also participated in the song as a songwriter and producer. She promoted the song in several music programs.

On September 3, Nada joined MBN's reality-variety show Miss Back. The show revolves around many female singers who debuted previously in girl groups, but slowly faded away from the limelight. On November 20, Nada released "Piggyback Ride" featuring singer Raina. On July 13, 2021, she announced her new single "Spicy", her first release in a year. "Spicy" was released along with its music video on July 31, 2021. On November 29, 2021, Nada release the single "Bulletproof".

== Discography ==
=== Mixtape ===
Release date	Title	Ref.
February 2, 2016	Homework	

=== Singles ===
==== Solo ====
Release date	Title	Notes
August 9, 2013	"Bang Bang"	Produced by her
December 22, 2016	"Seorae Village" (서래마을)	
September 27, 2017	"Trippin'"	Lyricist
June 25, 2020	"My Body" (내 몸)	Lyricist and producer
July 31, 2021	"Spicy" (신)	Lyricist
November 28, 2021	"Bulletproof"	Lyricist

==== As a featured artist ====
Release date	Title	Artist(s)	Album	Notes
May 18, 2014	"Domperii" (feat. Red Roc, Nada)	Pharoh	Part 1	
May 18, 2014	"We Are The Champs" (feat. Nada & Nari from Wassup)	Champs	Dynamite	
March 27, 2015	"Pendulum" (시계추) (feat. Nada of Wassup)	THE GITA	—N/a	
May 27, 2015	"What About You?" (feat. Nada of Wassup, Eugene Jung, Seo Paul)	Takers	—N/a	
November 28, 2015	"Move Out" (비켜) (feat. Nada of Wassup)	BETHEBLUE	Emergence	
October 13, 2015	"Luv Me"	Stephanie	Top Secret	
March 2, 2016	"I Just Wanna" (feat. NADA of Wassup)	Grey Day	Permeate	
August 11, 2019	"Oy Mama" (feat. Nada)	EVE	—N/a	

==== Collaborations ====
Release year	Release day	Title	Feat	Album	Notes
2016	February 23	"Do You Now My Heart?" (내 맘을 아냐고)	NADA of Wassup, MADTOWN, Rooftop House Studio feat. Jui	—N/a	co-producer
2016	December 22	"Together As One"	with various artists	Hooxi, The Beginning	W Foundation & United Nations campaign
2018	January 12	"Ride"	Sumin	—N/a	
2018	June 15	"Dozer" (도져)	Mina Myoung	MND Project	
2020	November 20	"Piggyback Ride" (어부바)	Raina	MBN Miss Back Part.2	
2020	December 17	"tantara"	Raina, Soyul (Crayon Pop)	MBN Miss Back Part.4	
2020	November 20	"Winter Fantasy"	Dalsooobin, Sera, Gayoung, Soyul (Crayon Pop), Raina & Jung Yujin (The Ark)	MBN Miss Back Part.5	
2021	January 27	"Finale"	Raina, Sera, Dalsooobin, Gayoung, Soyul (Crayon Pop) & Jung Yujin (The Ark)	MBN Miss Back Part.9	
2021	January 27	"We Are the One"	Raina, Sera, Dalsooobin, Gayoung, Soyul (Crayon Pop) & Jung Yujin (The Ark)	MBN Miss Back Part.9	

=== Participation on albums ===
Release year	Release day	Title	Artist(s)	Album	Notes
2015	October 13	"Luv Me"	Stephanie	Top Secret	
2016	August 20	"Scary (Prod.by KUSH)" (with Soyeon) (무서워)		Unpretty Rapstar 3 Compilation	
2016	August 27	"Sticky (Prod. By San E)" (Feat. San E)		Unpretty Rapstar 3 Compilation	
2016	September 10	"Nothing (Prod. By Swings)" (Feat. Swings)		Unpretty Rapstar 3 Compilation	
2016	September 17	"Nasty" (Feat. Park Mi-kyung)		Unpretty Rapstar 3 Compilation	
2016	September 24	"King pin" (Feat. Koonta, Don Mills)		Unpretty Rapstar 3 Compilation	
2016	October 24	"She's coming (Prod. By Primary)"	Unpretty Rapstar contestants	Unpretty Rapstar 3 Compilation	

== Filmography ==
=== TV series ===
Year	Title	Role	Notes
2020	Hanging On		Guest appearance - Episode 7

=== TV show ===
Year	Title	Role	Notes
2014	Show Me the Money 3	Herself	Contestant until round 3
2016	Unpretty Rapstar 3	Herself	Contestant
2018	It's Okay to Be a Little Crazy	Herself	Cast member
2018	Never Sleep	Herself	Cast member
2020–2021	Miss Back	Herself	Cast member
2021	Camping Middle School	Herself	Cast member
