= Park Soo-young (entertainer) =

South Korean singer and actress (born 1992)

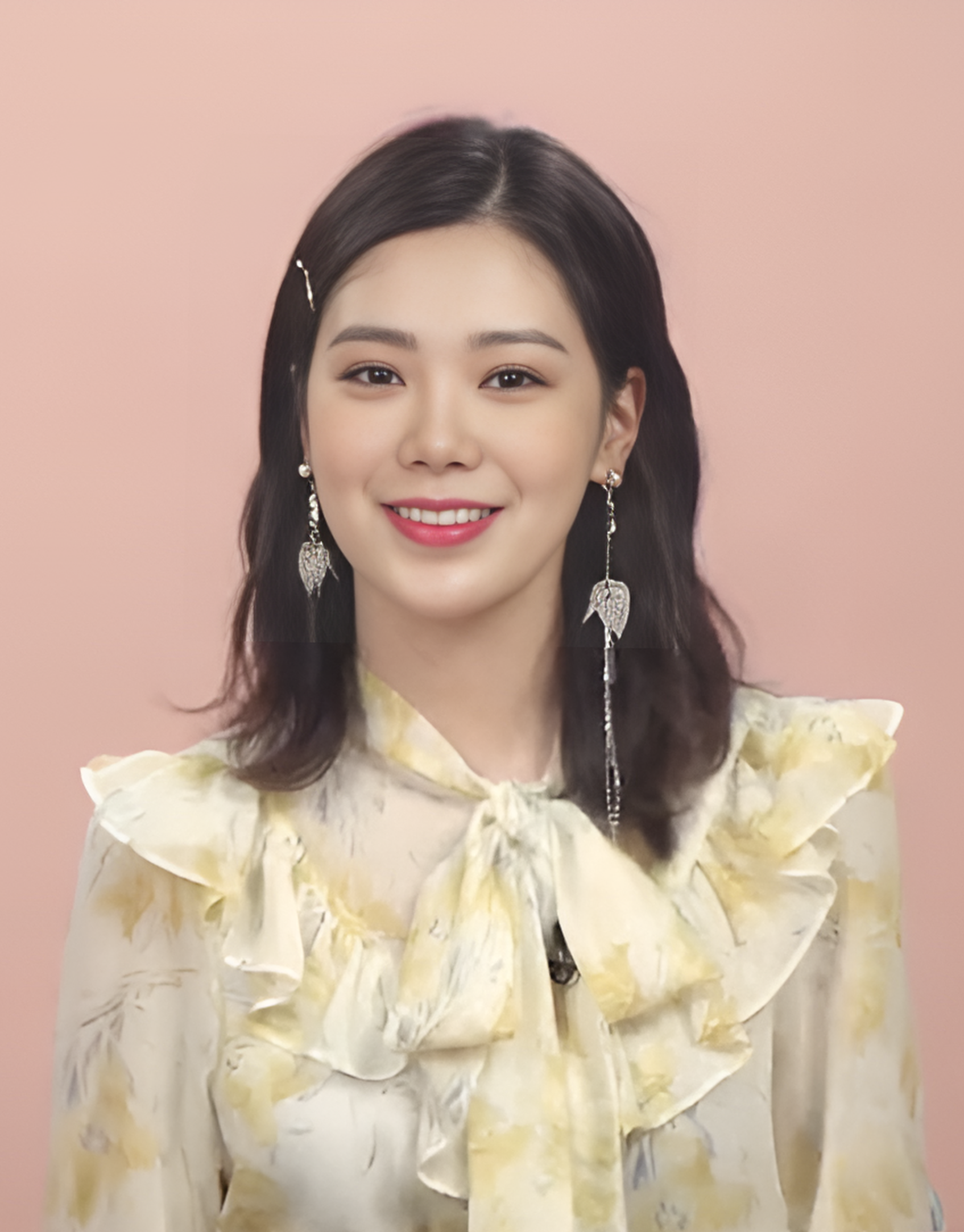
- Park in 2019
- Born: Park Soo-young; July 31, 1992 (age 34); Busan, South Korea
- Other names: Lizzy; Park Soo-ah
- Occupations: Singer; actress
- Years active: 2010–present
- Agent: BK Entertainment
- Musical career
- Genres: K-pop
- Instrument: Vocals
- Years active: 2010–2018
- Label: Pledis
- Formerly of: After School; Orange Caramel; A.S. Blue

Korean name
- Hangul: 박수영
- Hanja: 朴修映
- RR: Bak Suyeong
- MR: Pak Suyŏng

Signature
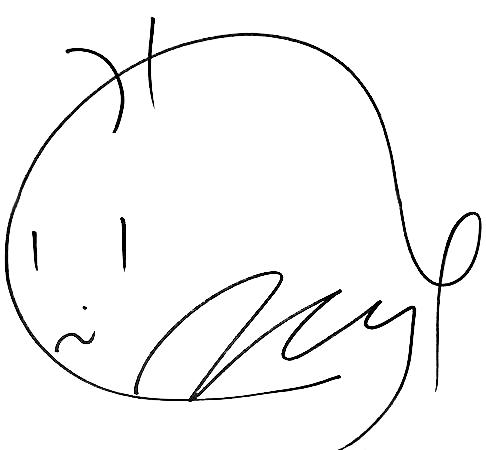

Park Soo-young (Korean: 박수영; born July 31, 1992), is a South Korean singer and actress. She debuted under the stage name Lizzy (리지) as a member of the South Korean girl group After School in March 2010 and later formed part of the group's sub-units, Orange Caramel and After School Blue. She made her solo debut in January 2015 with the digital single "Not an Easy Girl". Outside of her music career, Park has starred in various television dramas, including All My Love (2011) and Angry Mom (2015).

In May 2018, Park graduated from After School following the expiration of her contract, but remains a member of Orange Caramel. Following her departure, she shifted her work to acting and changed her stage name to Park Soo-ah (박수아). In November 2020, she changed her professional name, for a second time, to Park Soo-young, her birth name.

== Early life and education ==
Park was born on July 31, 1992, in Busan, South Korea. She attended Kyung Hee University, majoring in Post Modern Music.

== Career ==
=== 2009–2010: Career beginnings ===
Park served as Son Dam-bi's backup dancer in 2009. She was first hinted to be joining After School when she joined the members on stage to perform a cover of Fin.K.L.'s "To My Boyfriend" at their first fan meeting event in 2010, while donning a mask to keep her identity a secret. Park made her official debut as a member of After School under the stage name "Lizzy" when they released their third single "Bang!" on March 25, 2010. She was the youngest member of the group until E-Young joined the group in December 2010. In June 2010, Lizzy and her fellow After School members Raina and Nana formed a sub-unit named Orange Caramel and released their first mini-album featuring the lead single "Magic Girl".

=== 2011–2017: Television roles and solo debut ===
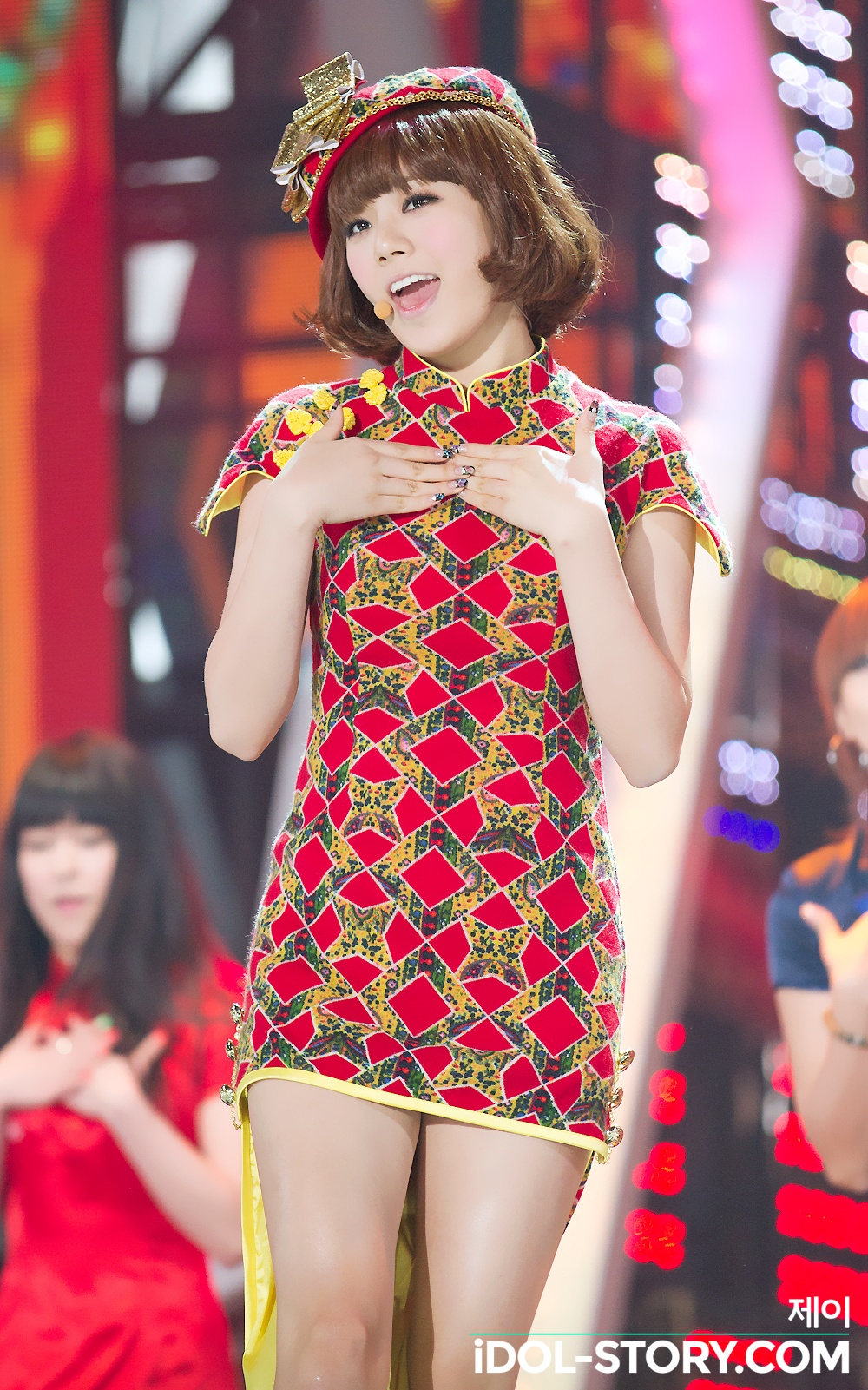
Park in 2011

In 2011, Park was briefly a cast member of the SBS variety show, Running Man. That same year, she made her acting debut as a supporting character on MBC's sitcom, All My Love. Her appearances in Running Man were often edited out, and she eventually left to focus on All My Love. In November 2012, Park was cast in MBC's weekend drama Rascal Sons, where she had a more significant role.

In December 2012, Park and indie rapper Andup released a collaborative single, "Cosmetic", for their single album Cupcake Project. In the same month, Park joined Sistar's Bora, 4Minute's Gayoon, Secret's Sunhwa and Kara's Jiyoung to form the project girl group Mystic White for the 2012 SBS Gayo Daejun. They performed their single "Mermaid Princess" on the show, and the song's profits were donated to people in need.

In July 2013, Park made a cameo appearance in the Japanese horror drama Evil Spirit Ward, playing the role of a Korean foreign student named Tehi. In 2014, she played a hair stylist named Hyeni in the film Momo Salon. The film consisted of six ten-minute episodes, and was released on Naver TV Cast on September 2.

In December 2014, Park was cast as a member of the second season of Jeong Hyeong-don and Defconn's show, Hitmaker. Lizzy, G.NA, 4Minute's Kwon So-hyun and Kara's Heo Young-ji became a girl group called Chamsonyeo (참소녀) for the show. The show began airing on January 16, 2015. She also had a supporting role in the film Love Forecast, which was released on January 15, 2015. That same month, Park replaced Kim Sung-eun as a co-MC of the food variety show, Tasty Road.

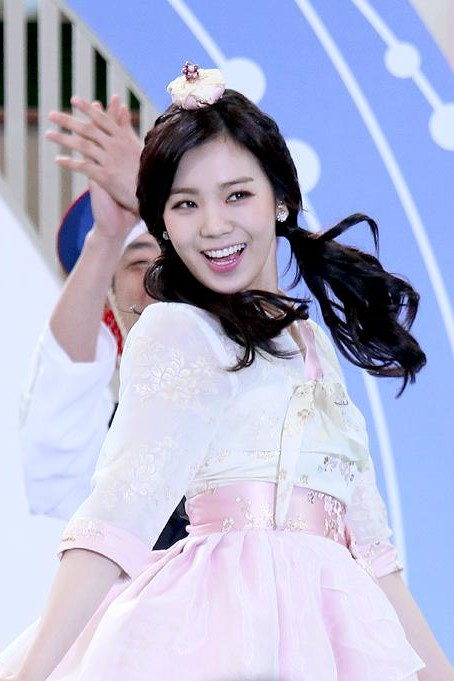
Park in January 2015

On January 23, 2015, Park debuted as a solo singer with the trot song "Not An Easy Girl" (쉬운 여자 아니에요). The music video used footage from the 1961 film adaptation of Chunhyangga, with Park playing the protagonist. On February 11, she released a duet song, "Goodbye PMS", with comedian Park Myung-soo. The song was written by Duble Sidekick, who said PMS (which usually means premenstrual syndrome) refers to "a monster that creates all the worries and stress suffered by a high school girl". Park also had a supporting role in MBC's drama Angry Mom, which aired from March to May.

In 2017, she joined as main MC on the first season of My Daughter's Men, being the only woman in the cast.

=== 2018–present: Acting career and legal troubles ===
On May 1, 2018, Park graduated from After School following the expiration of her contract. On May 10, Park joined Celltrion Entertainment. On July 3 it was announced that Park had changed her promotional name from 'Lizzy' to 'Park Soo-ah', and was cast in the web drama I Picked Up a Celebrity on the Street. On September 12, it was revealed by Celltrion Entertainment that Park had joined the main cast of the upcoming SBS drama Fates & Furies alongside Lee Min-jung, Joo Sang-wook, So Yi-hyun and Lee Ki-woo. The drama began to air on December 1. She also had a cameo in Devilish Charm.

In 2019, she was cast in the app drama, Kim Seul Gi Genius, which was released in May 2019. She was also part of the tvN's comedy drama, Ugly Miss Young-ae 17.

In an interview and pictorial with @star1 magazine for their December 2020 issue, Park revealed that she would now be promoting herself under her birth name, Park Soo-young.

On May 18, 2021, Park hit a taxi with her car while driving in Cheongdam-dong, a neighborhood of Seoul. Upon the arrival of law enforcement at the scene, she was determined to have a blood alcohol content of 0.08. As a result, she was charged with a DUI and had her driver's license revoked. In August 2021, Celltrion Entertainment announced that Park Soo-Ah's contract had expired, and after coming to an agreement between both parties, it would not be renewed.

In October 2022, Park signed with new agency BK Entertainment.

== Discography ==
=== Singles ===
Title	Year	Peak chart positions	Sales	Album
Title	Year	KOR	Sales	Album
"Not an Easy Girl" (feat. Jung Hyung-don)	2015	38	KOR (DL): 71,150	Non-album single

=== Other songs ===
Year	Title	Album
2011	"Beautiful Girl"	All My Love OST
2012	"Clara's Dream" (클라라의 꿈)	Lipstick
2012	"Cosmetic" (코스메틱) (with Andup)	Cupcake Project
2012	"Mermaid Princess" (인어공주) (as part of Mystic White)	Non-album single
2013	"Sour Grapes (すっぱい葡萄)"	Orange Caramel
2014	"Chemistry" (케미) (with Yoon Gun)	Autumn Play
2015	"Goodbye PMS" (with Park Myung-soo)	Non-album single
2015	"Magic Words" (올해의 주문) (as part of Chamsonyeo)	Non-album single
2015	"플라플라 (Flower)" (with Kanto)	Cheer Up! OST
2016	"상상 속의 너 (You in My Imagination)" (with Raina)	Two Yoo Project Sugar Man Part 13
2016	"비밀번호 486" (시집가는 갑순이) (Password 486 (going to marry this gapsun))	King of Mask Singer 45회 (single)
2017	"Believe Only Brother" (오빠만 믿어) (with Park Hyun-bin, Park Gwang-hyun & Lee Gi-kwang)	Fantastic Duo 2 Part 16

== Filmography ==
=== Film ===
Year	Title	Role	Notes	Ref.
2011	White: The Melody of the Curse	Member of Pure	Cameo with After School	
2014	Momo Salon	Hyeni		
2015	Love Forecast	Min-ah		
2016	Mood of the Day	Song Yi		

=== Television series ===
Year	Title	Role	Notes	Ref.
2010	All My Love for You	Park Soon-deok	Main role; Episode 64, 74-210	
2012	Rascal Sons	Jin Yoo-ri		
2012	What Is Mom	Park Soo-young	Cameo; Episode 16	
2013	Demon Ward – Akuryo Byoutou	Tehi	Cameo; Episodes 3–4	
2015	Angry Mom	Wang Jung-hee		
2018	Fates & Furies	Tae Jung-min		
2018	Devilish Charm	Kang Song-hwa	Cameo; Episode 10	
2019	Kim Is a Genius	Song Kwan-ji	Main role	
2019	Ugly Miss Young-ae 17	Park Soo-ah		
2019	Flower Crew: Joseon Marriage Agency	Lee Eun-young	Cameo; Episode 1	
2020	Oh My Baby	Choi Hyo-joo		

=== Web series ===
Year	Title	Role	Notes	Ref.
2013	After School: Lucky or Not	Lizzy	Cameo; Episode 5	
2018	I Picked Up a Celebrity on the Street	Jin Se-ra		

=== Television shows ===
Year	Title	Role	Notes	Ref.
2010–2011	Running Man	Regular cast	Episodes 13–27, 292(Guest)	
2012	Pit-a-Pat Shake	Regular cast		
2013	After School's Beauty Bible	Main host		
2014–2015	Hitmaker Season 2	Cast	with Kara's Youngji, G.NA, and 4minute's So-hyun	
2015	Tasty Road	MC		
2015	King of Mask Singer	Panelist	Episodes 9–10; 45 (as contestant)	
2017	My Daughter's Men	MC		
2018	Follow Me 9	Main host		
2019	Trend With Me	Main host		

=== Web shows ===
Year	Title	Role	Notes	Ref.
2018	Shoot-Out: Mart War	Cast member		
