= Park Subin =

South Korean singer (born 1994)

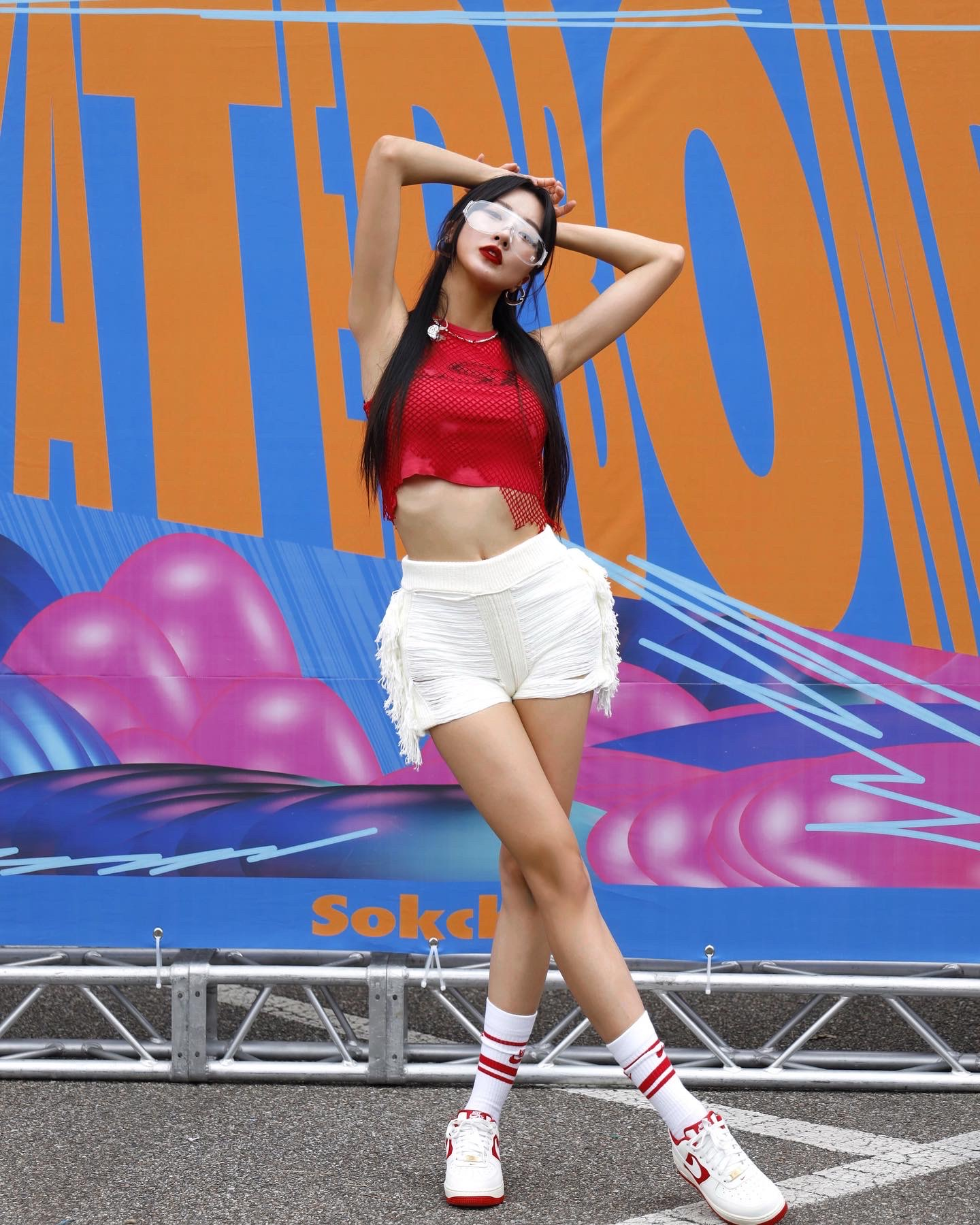
- Park in May 2023
- Born: Park Subin; February 12, 1994 (age 32); Gwangju, South Korea
- Education: Konkuk University
- Occupations: Singer; songwriter; television host
- Musical career
- Genre: K-pop
- Instrument: Vocals
- Years active: 2011–present
- Labels: Happy Face; Dalsoobin Company
- Formerly of: Dal Shabet

Korean name
- Hangul: 박수빈
- Hanja: 朴秀彬
- RR: Bak Subin
- MR: Pak Subin

Park Subin (Korean: 박수빈; born February 12, 1994), better known as Subin or Dalsooobin or her DJ name SUVIN, is a South Korean singer, songwriter, actress, television host, and DJ. She made her debut in 2011 as a member of the South Korean girl group Dal Shabet. She made her solo debut in 2016.

== Early life and education ==
Park was born on February 12, 1994, in Gwangju. She is currently majoring in Theatre at Konkuk University.

== Career ==
=== 2011–15: Career beginnings ===
Park made her debut through the release of Supa Dupa Diva with Dal Shabet on January 3, 2011. Promotions for "Supa Dupa Diva" began on January 6, 2011, on Mnet's M! Countdown.

Along with her fellow Dal Shabet members, Park made a cameo in the hit KBS' series Dream High as a student of Kirin High School. Park and Dal Shabet also later appeared in the movie Wonderful Radio as the fictional girl group "Corby Girls". She joined the cast of Koreana Jones on March 28, 2011, and participated in eight episodes. Along with fellow Dal Shabet member Serri, Park participated in the OST for the OCN series Quiz of God 2. The track, titled Turn Your Head, was released on June 23, 2011. She was a co-MC on KBS2's TV program Poker Face Season 2, which premiered on July 13, 2011. The show ran until September 7, 2011, and had ten episodes.

In 2012, Park became a temporary MC for eight episodes of SBS M's Studio C with Mighty Mouth. She later joined the cast of MBC's Music Storage with Yang Hee-eun, Horan, and ZE:A's Junyoung. The show ran for ten episodes from October 13, 2012, to December 1, 2012.

Park became the host of the MBC program Music Talk Talk Ma Bling in January 2013. The show ran for 117 episodes, with the final episode airing on July 12, 2013. During the program's run, Park was cast in the seven-episode tvN mini-series Find the Fake. On December 25, 2013, Park made a cameo appearance in the SBS' series My Love from the Star.

Park composed and co-wrote the song Just Pass By with BtoB's Jung Il-hoon. The track is Park's first solo and was included on Dal Shabet's seventh EP, B.B.B, which was released on January 8, 2014.

On May 2, 2014, Park became a cast member of the second season of MBC Every 1's 9 to 6, a program which involved celebrities seeking employment in jobs outside of the entertainment industry. The broadcast of the program experienced multiple interruptions and delays due to the Sewol tragedy and Park being involved in a car accident.

Park produced Dal Shabet's eighth EP, Joker is Alive, which was released on April 15, 2015, also contributing as co-writer for all tracks.

=== 2016–present: Solo debut ===
Park debuted as a soloist with the single album Flower in May 2016, featuring the tracks "Hate" and "Flower". Both songs were written and produced by herself. She followed this up with the release of her first EP, Our Love, on June 20.

Park lent her vocals to all four songs released as part of the soundtrack for variety show "I Am a Movie Director, Too" where she was also a cast member on the show.

On December 28, 2016 she released another digital single Moon, Pt. 1, consisting of two tracks, "Swing" and "Moon". Following the release, Park release her second EP, Circle's Dream, on February 23, 2017. The EP contains four tracks, including double title track "Circle's Dream" and "Strawberry", along with "Swing" and "Moon", which previously release as a part of the digital single Moon, Pt. 1.

In December 2017, Park's contract with Happy Face Entertainment expired and she subsequently left the label. Her future with Dal Shabet remains in discussion.

In February 2018, it was reported that she had signed a contract with KeyEast. She release the digital single "Katchup" as her new stage name Dalsooobin.

On July 26, 2022, it was announced that Dal Soobin will be making a comeback with the single "Hookah", which she wrote, arranged and produced by Dal Soobin. The track will be released on July 28.

== Discography ==
=== Extended plays ===
- Our Love (2016)
- Circle's Dream (2017)

=== Singles ===
Title	Year	Peak chart positions	Sales	Album
Title	Year	KOR	Sales	Album
"Hate" (미워)	2016	—	—N/a	Our Love
"Our Love" (이 곳)	2016	—	—N/a	Our Love
"Moon" (달)	2016	—	—N/a	Circle's Dream
"Circle's Dream" (동그라미의 꿈)	2017	—	—N/a	Circle's Dream
"Strawberry"	2017	—	—N/a	Circle's Dream
"Katchup"	2019	—	—N/a	Non-album single
"DIVE"	2020	—	—N/a	Disappearing and Alive
"Eyes Like Snow" (눈 닮은 눈)	2021	—	—N/a	Eyes Like Snow
"HOOKAH" (우훅) (Note: "Hooka BEST Remix" album was released on August 12, 2022.)	2022	—	—N/a	337
"TANAKA SAN" (다나카상)	2023	—	—N/a	Soobin Shortform-Suform Project
"Extra" (엑스트라)	2024	—	—N/a	Extra
"MUCK" (먹)	2024	—	—N/a	Muck
"—" denotes releases that did not chart.

=== Collaborations ===
- Norwegian Wood ft. DALsooobin - Architecture 101 (2019)
- Hyemin ft. DALsooobin - Goosebumps (2024)

=== Soundtrack appearances ===
Title	Year	Peak chart positions	Sales	Album
Title	Year	KOR	Sales	Album
"Turn Your Head" with Serri	2011	—	—N/a	Quiz of God 2 OST
"Only Tell Me"	2014	—	—N/a	Love & Secret OST
"Dream" with Eddy Kim	2016	—	—N/a	I Am a Movie Director, Too OST
"Update" (UP데이트) with ATO	2016	—	—N/a	I Am a Movie Director, Too OST
"Walkie-Talkie" (워키토키)	2016	—	—N/a	I Am a Movie Director, Too OST
"I Love You Even Though I Hate You" (미워도 사랑하니까) (as Lady First with Park Bo-ram)	2016	—	—N/a	King of Mask Singer Episode 59
"Parasol" (파라솔)	2017	—	—N/a	Idol Drama Operation Team OST
"Winter Fantasy" with Raina, Sera, Gayoung, Soyul (Crayon Pop), Nada & Jung Yujin (The Ark)	2020	—	—N/a	Miss Back Part.5
"Finale" with Raina, Sera, Gayoung, Soyul (Crayon Pop), Nada & Jung Yujin (The Ark)	2021	—	—N/a	Miss Back Part.9
"We Are The One" with Raina, Sera, Gayoung, Soyul (Crayon Pop), Nada & Jung Yujin (The Ark)	2021	—	—N/a	Miss Back Part.9
"Sign"	2021	—	—N/a	Miss Back Part.10
"—" denotes releases that did not chart.

== Filmography ==
=== Film ===
Year	Title	Role	Notes	Ref.
2012	Wonderful Radio	Corby Girl	Cameo	
2021	Wish You	Lee Yoo Jin		
2023	Our Song	Sae-Rom		
2025	Sweet Home	Park Jeong-yoon		

=== Television series ===
Year	Title	Role	Notes	Ref.
2011	Dream High	Baek-hee's Kirin student	Cameo with Dalshabet members	
2019	Shady Mom-in-Law	Jin Ae Young	Support Role	
2020	Wish You: Your Melody From My Heart	Lee Yoo Jin	Support Role	

=== Television show ===
Year	Title	Role	Notes	Ref.
2011	Koreana Jones	Cast	8 episodes	
2011	Poker Face Season 2	Host	10 episodes	
2012	Studio C	Host	8 episodes	
2012	Music Storage	Host	10 episodes	
2013	Music Talk Talk Ma Bling	Host	117 episodes	
2013	Find the Fake	Cast	7 episodes	
2014	9 to 6 Season 2	Cast	10 episodes	
2015	King of Mask Singer	Contestant	1 episode	
2020	Miss Back	Regular member		
2021	Good.R.Sam	Host		
2022	Running Full Course	Cast Member	pilot program	
2023	Beauty & Booty	Host	Season 8	

=== Web shows ===
Year	Title	Role	Notes	Ref.
2018	Plan Man: Season 3	Regular member	17 episodes	
2021	Camping Middle School	Cast Member	Camping Car YouTube	

== Awards and nominations ==
Name of the award ceremony, year presented, category, nominee of the award, and the result of the nomination
Award ceremony	Year	Category	Nominee / Work	Result	Ref.
SBS Drama Awards	2019	Best New Actress	Shady Mom-in-Law	Nominated	
