= Orange Caramel (album) =

Studio album by Orange Caramel
- Released: March 13, 2013 (Japan)
- Recorded: 2012–2013
- Genre: Electropop; dance
- Label: Avex Trax; Pledis
- Producer: S.S. Han; M. Matsuura

Orange Caramel chronology
Lipstick (2012)	Orange Caramel (2013)

Singles from Orange Caramel
- 1. "Yasashii Akuma" Released: September 5, 2012; 2. "Lipstick/Lamu no Love Song" Released: December 12, 2012; 3. "Cookies, Cream & Mint" Released: February 13, 2013

Orange Caramel is the debut (second overall) Japanese studio album by South Korean girl group After School sub-unit Orange Caramel. It was released on March 13, 2013, by Avex Trax. The album was preceded by the singles "Yasashii Akuma" and "Lipstick/Lamu no Love Song".

== Singles ==
"Yasashii Akuma" (やさしい悪魔), also known as "My Sweet Devil", was the first single released in Japan by the group. The song is a remake of 1970's pop group Candies' song "Yasashii Akuma". The B-side is a Japanese version of their Korean debut single, "Magic Girl". The single was released on September 5, 2012, peaking on the Oricon Weekly Chart at #10.

"Lipstick/Lamu no Love Song" was the dual-second single released in Japan. "Lipstick" is a Japanese remake of the Korean single from their first Korean album Lipstick. "Lamu no Love Song" is a cover of the opening theme for the popular anime series Urusei Yatsura. The song was released on December 12, 2012, and peaked on the Oricon Weekly Chart at #12.

== Track listing ==
All editions track list
No.	Title	Length
1.	"A-ing" (アイン♡; Japanese version)	3:30
2.	"Magic Girl" (魔法少女; Japanese version)	3:09
3.	"Cookies, Cream & Mint" (クッキークリーム&ミン)	3:31
4.	"Bangkok City" (Japanese version)	2:49
5.	"Lipstick" (Japanese version)	3:21
6.	"The Angel's Wink" (天使のウィンク)	3:35
7.	"Lamu no Love Song" (ラムのラブソング)	2:41
8.	"My Sweet Devil" (やさしい悪魔)	3:07
9.	"Shanghai Romance" (上海ロマンス; Japanese version)	3:47
10.	"Red Shoes" (赤いくつ)	3:48

DVD (version A): Music Video Collection
No.	Title	Length
1.	"Cookies, Cream & Mint" (クッキークリーム&ミント)
2.	"Lamu no Love Song" (ラムのラブソング)
3.	"Lipstick" (Japanese version)
4.	"My Sweet Devil" (やさしい悪魔)
5.	"Bangkok City" (original version)
6.	"Shanghai Romance" (上海ロマンス; original version)
7.	"A-ing" (アイン□; original version)
8.	"Magic Girl" (魔法少女; original version)
9.	"Cookies, Cream & Mint" (クッキークリーム&ミント; dance edit version)
10.	"Cookies, Cream & Mint" (クッキークリーム&ミント; making movie)

DVD (Version B)
No.	Title	Length
1.	"Orange Caramel Returns" (「オレキャラチャンネルReturns!! ～ワタシを♡♡♡につれてって～」)
2.	"Orange Caramel Returns" (オレキャラチャンネル making&未公開映像; making movie)

Bonus tracks (version C)
No.	Title	Length
11.	"Sleeping Forest" (眠れる森; Nana solo)	3:23
12.	"Sour Grapes" (すっぱい葡萄; Lizzy solo)	2:49
13.	"Meteor and Piercing" (流星とピアス; Raina solo)	4:54

Note: the digital track list is inconsistent. On Amazon Music, it includes all of the tracks, but on Spotify, the Japanese version of Lipstick, Lamu no Love Song, My Sweet Devil, and the Japanese version of Magic Girl are excluded.

== Chart performance ==
=== Weekly charts ===
Charts (2013)	Peak position
Japanese albums (Oricon)	21
Billboard Japan Top Albums	28
