= Ryu Se-ra =

South Korean singer

- 류세라
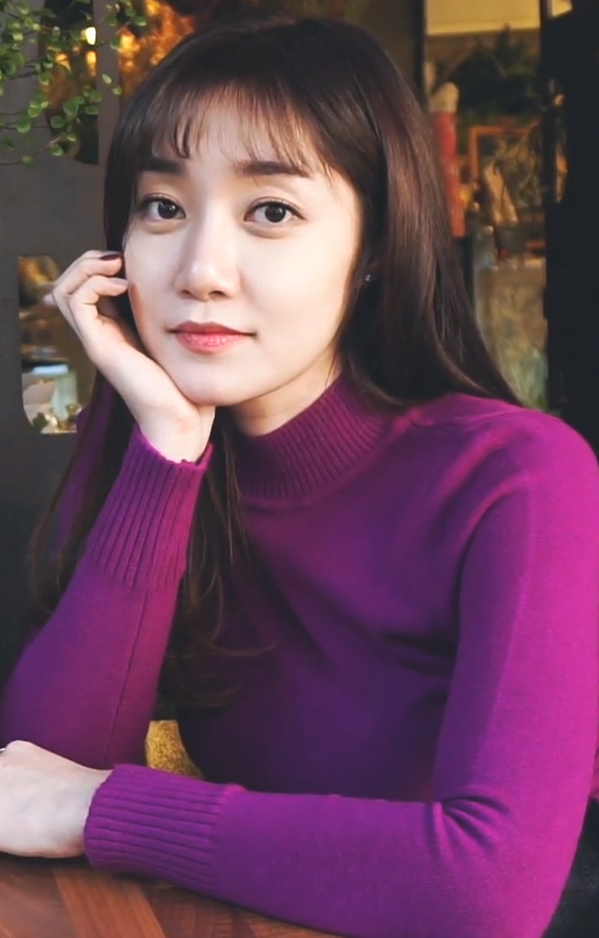
- Ryu in March 2018
- Born: Ryu Se-ra; October 3, 1987 (age 39); Busan, South Korea
- Occupations: Singer; songwriter; YouTuber
- Spouse: Unknown (m. 2025)
- Musical career
- Genres: K-pop; R&B
- Instruments: Vocals; piano; guitar
- Years active: 2010–present
- Labels: Star Empire; OCTO
- Formerly of: Nine Muses
- Website: ryusera.com

Korean name
- Hangul: 류세라
- Hanja: 柳世羅
- RR: Ryu Sera
- MR: Ryu Sera

Ryu Se-ra (Korean: 류세라, born October 3, 1987), also known by the mononym Sera (Korean: 세라), is a South Korean singer-songwriter signed under the self-founded agency OCTO. She is a former leader and main vocalist of South Korean girl group Nine Muses.

== Personal life ==
Ryu has a younger brother and lived in Vancouver for over 3 years during high school. Her parents divorced whilst she was a trainee. On the variety show Miss Back, Ryu revealed she had been diagnosed with depression and panic disorder, sharing that her medication caused her to suffer from memory problems.

On January 31, 2025, Ryu announced her upcoming wedding to a non-celebrity. On April 23, Ryu announced via Instagram that she had gotten married.

== Career ==
=== 2010–2014: Debut with Nine Muses ===
On August 12, 2010, Ryu debuted as part of the girl group Nine Muses. Later, she became the leader and main vocalist of the group, following the departure of former leader Rana. On June 23, 2014, Star Empire announced that Ryu's exclusive contract had expired and she announced that she had also left the group.

=== 2015–present: Solo activities and new agency ===
On August 1, 2015, Ryu released her first solo indie EP album "SeRen:Ade". In September 2015, Ryu held her first solo concert in Hongdae, for which 600 people attended.

In March 2018, Ryu founded a new agency OCTO and announced that she would continue solo activities with her real name, Ryu Se-ra. An agency official has stated that the name OCTO carries a meaning of a new beginning. On March 2, Ryu released a single album "Stay Real", managed and published by her new agency. Later that month, Ryu held a second solo concert titled "Spring Rain" at Olympic Hall Muse Live stage, followed by a concert titled "Sun Shower" held on June 23, 2018, at CKL stage. Since 2014, Ryu has been active on YouTube where she shares her solo activities and song covers with her fans. She appeared as a contestant on the music survival reality show Miss Back between October 8, 2020, and January 26, 2021, where she became a finalist.

== Discography ==
=== Extended plays ===
Title	Album details	Peak chart positions	Sales
Title	Album details	KOR	Sales
SeRen:Ade	Released: August 1, 2015; Label: Independent; Format: CD	—	—N/a
"—" denotes releases that did not chart or were not released in that region.

=== Single albums ===
Title	Album details	Peak chart positions	Sales
Title	Album details	KOR	Sales
Stay Real	Released: March 2, 2018; Label: OCTO; Format: CD, digital download	—	—N/a
"—" denotes releases that did not chart or were not released in that region.

=== Singles ===
Title	Year	Peak chart positions	Sales	Album
Title	Year	KOR	Sales	Album
as Main Artist
"Walk With Me" (나와 걸어줘)	2018	—	—N/a	Stay Real
"Han River" (한강)	2018	—	—N/a	Non-album single
Soundtrack appearances
"Day By Day" (하루하루)	2016	—	—N/a	Introduce Me a Good Person OST Part.14
"Up and Down" (오르락 내리락)	2020	—	—N/a	Miss Back Part.3
"Cat`s Rain" (고양이비) with Jung Yujin (The Ark)	2020	—	—N/a	Miss Back Part.5
"Winter Fantasy" with Raina, Dalsooobin, Gayoung, Soyul (Crayon Pop), Nada & Jung Yujin (The Ark)	2020	—	—N/a	Miss Back Part.5
"Lean On Me" (기대)	2020	—	—N/a	Miss Back Part.6
"Finale" with Raina, Dalsooobin, Gayoung, Soyul (Crayon Pop), Nada & Jung Yujin (The Ark)	2021	—	—N/a	Miss Back Part.9
"We Are The One" with Raina, Dalsooobin, Gayoung, Soyul (Crayon Pop), Nada & Jung Yujin (The Ark)	2021	—	—N/a	Miss Back Part.9
"—" denotes releases that did not chart or were not released in that region.

== Filmography ==
=== TV series ===
Year	Title	Network	Role	Ref.
2013	Blue Tower	tvN	Tae-hee (Cameo)	
2013	Reckless Family 2	MBC TV	Sera	

=== Reality shows ===
Year	Title	Network	Role	Ref.
2020	Miss Back	MBN	Cast member	

=== Documentary ===
Year	Title	Director
2012	9 Muses of Star Empire	Lee Hark-joon

== Endorsements ==
- [2011] CJ Condition Raisin Tree Drink (with Oh Ji-ho)
- [2013] Hug Ozawa's Eyes Cloud Glasses
- [2013] Jinjusangdan Hanboks

== Modelling career ==
- 2011 Seoul Fashion Week
- 2012 Korean International Style Show in Japan
- 2012 K-Collection in Seoul
- 2012 K-pop Nature Concert in Jeju
