= Kim Ga-young (actress) =

South Korean actress and singer (born 1991)

- 김가영
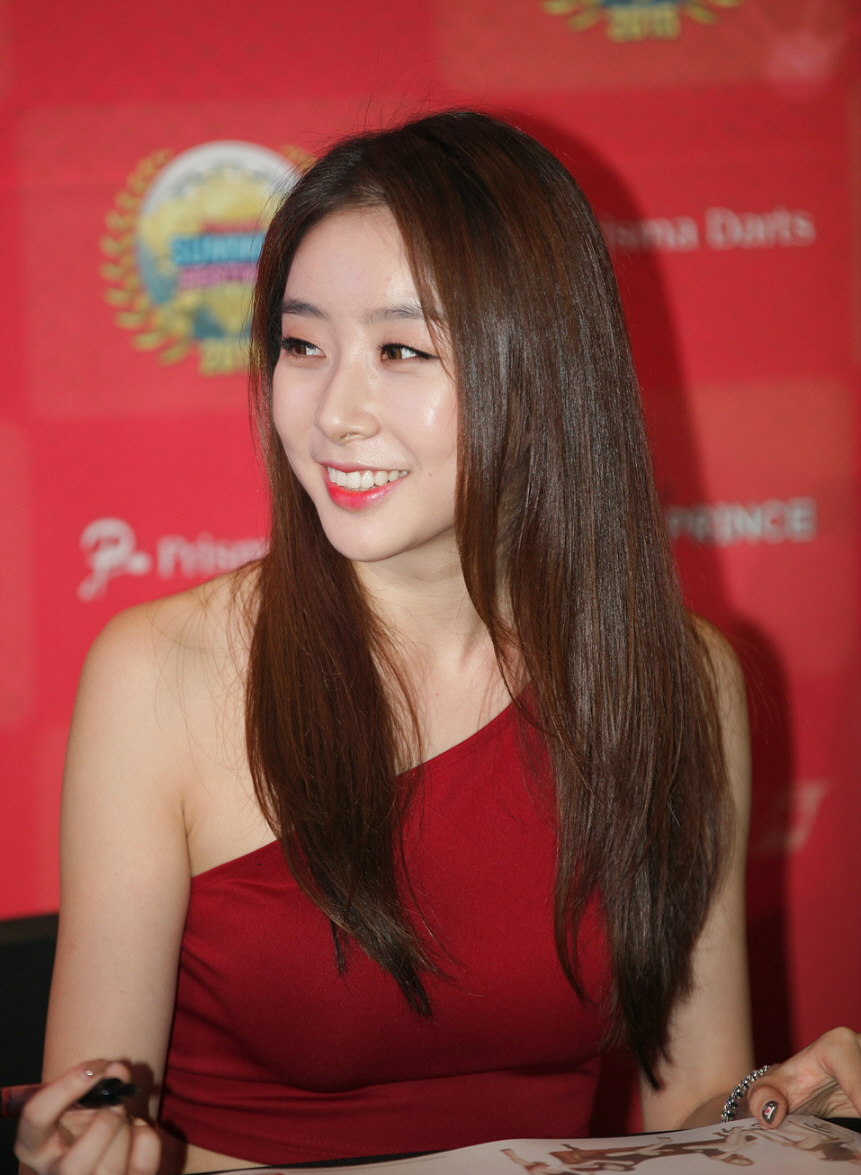
- Kim in October 2015
- Born: December 2, 1991 (age 34); Seoul, South Korea
- Education: Sungkyunkwan University (Bachelor of Dance)
- Occupations: Singer; actress
- Years active: 2011–present
- Spouse: Unknown (m. 2026)
- Musical career
- Genres: K-pop
- Instrument: Vocals
- Years active: 2011–present
- Formerly of: Stellar

Korean name
- Hangul: 김가영
- Hanja: 金佳英
- RR: Gim Gayeong
- MR: Kim Kayŏng
- Website: gayoung.kim

Kim Ga-young (Korean: 김가영; born December 2, 1991) is a South Korean singer and actress. She is best known as a former member of the South Korean girl-group Stellar between 2011 and 2017. She is currently also the manager of her own cafe called "Hartogela" in Itaewon, South Korea.

== Career ==
=== 2010–2011: "Gugak high-school girl" and idol pre-debut ===
Gayoung initially gained fame as the "Gugak high-school girl" when she appeared on a 2 Days & 1 Night special as a viewer. She was later scouted by the agency, Top Class Entertainment (which was later renamed The Entertainment Pascal). She entered the agency with the intention of being an actress, and she debuted as such in Spy Myung-wol, however her agency wanted her to sing and dance as well and she was soon debuted as an idol as part of the girl-group Stellar.

=== 2011–2017: Stellar ===
Stellar initially debuted with a quirky and cute concept, but as the agency was struggling financially due to multiple unsuccessful album releases, the girl-group later turned to a more provocative concept which received a lot of controversy and backlash.

=== 2017–present: Continued acting, interview about the sexy contract & reveal difficulties as an idol and Miss Back ===
In August 2017 she did not renew her contract with her then agency, The Entertainment Pascal, and started pursuing roles in acting for herself. In 2018 she revealed that she has opened a cafe called "Hartogela" in Itaewon and is running it while continuing to pursue her dream of being an actress.

== Personal life ==
On February 14, 2026, Gayoung announced to get married on February 28 according to a revealing message from advertising casting director A and the wedding will held in private.

== Discography ==
=== Singles ===
| Title | Year | Peak chart positions | Album |
| Title | Year | KOR | Album |
|---|---|---|---|
| "Winter Fantasy" with Raina, Sera, Dalsooobin, Soyul (Crayon Pop), Nada & Jung Yujin (The Ark) | 2020 | — | Miss Back Part.5 |
| "Double Fantasy" with Hong Dae Kwang | 2021 | — | Miss Back Part.8 |
| "Finale" with Raina, Dalsooobin, Sera, Soyul (Crayon Pop), Nada & Jung Yujin (The Ark) | 2021 | — | Miss Back Part.9 |
| "We Are The One" with Raina, Dalsooobin, Sera, Soyul (Crayon Pop), Nada & Jung Yujin (The Ark) | 2021 | — | Miss Back Part.9 |
"—" denotes releases that did not chart.

== Filmography ==
=== Film ===
| Year | Title | Role | Note(s) | Ref. |
|---|---|---|---|---|
| 2016 | The Colorbus | Chae-hwa | University short film | |
| 2017 | Witch | Ji Young | Short film | |
| 2017 | Ancestors of Pilgrims | Killer 501 | Interactive web movie | |
| 2018 | Strangely Scary Wind Blowing Day | Yeon-mi | Short film | |

=== Television series ===
| Year | Title | Role | Ref. |
|---|---|---|---|
| 2011 | Spy Myung-wol | Joo Kyoung-joo | |
| 2014 | Dr. Frost | Darae | |
| 2015 | The Superman Age | Cameo | |
| 2015 | Who Are You: School 2015 | Cameo | |
| 2017 | Blue Up, White Down | Jin-ah | |
| 2017 | Traces of the Hand | Fanciful Companion Girl | |
| 2017 | Girls' War | Tae-hee | |
| 2017 | Calm Down Cheongdong | Gayoung | |
| 2018 | Joseon's Beauty Pageant | Beauty Candidate #1 Gayoung | |
| 2018 | Yeonnam-dong 539 | Soo-yon | |
| 2018 | Love is Actually with You | Ga-eul | |
| 2018 | Quiz of God: Reboot | Reporter | |
| 2019 | The Tale of Nokdu | Gook-hwa | |

== Awards and nominations ==
Name of the award ceremony, year presented, category, nominee of the award, and the result of the nomination
| Award ceremony | Year | Category | Nominee / Work | Result | Ref. |
|---|---|---|---|---|---|
| Seoul Webfest Awards | 2017 | Best Dramedy | Blue Up, White Down | Won | |
| Seoul Webfest Awards | 2017 | Best Ensemble | Blue Up, White Down | Nominated | |
| Seoul Webfest Awards | 2017 | Best Supporting Actress | Blue Up, White Down | Nominated | |
| Seoul Webfest Awards | 2018 | Best Supporting Actress | Calm Down Cheon-dong | Nominated | |
