= Champs (Brazilian band) =

Brazilian boy band

- Origin: São Paulo, Brazil
- Genres: Dance-pop, hip hop, K-pop
- Years active: 2013-2015
- Labels: JS Entertainment
- Past members: Diego; Ricky; Kenji; Henrique Bessat; Iago

Champs was a Brazilian boy band formed in 2013 by JS Entertainment owner Alex JS Lee. Champs consisted of five members: Diego, Ricky, Kenji, Henrique Bessat and Iago.

Champs made its first appearance of pre-debut in October 2013 at Arirang TV in Seoul, South Korea. In November 2013, they appeared on PlayTV in São Paulo. In June 2014, the group began its official activities.

== History ==
=== 2014: Dynamite ===
In January 2013, JS Entertainment recruited four members through auditions. In October of the same year, the agency recruited another member. The group was named by the media and fans as a "B-pop band" due to its influences in K-pop music and South Korean music groups, although the term "B-pop" had never been used by other artists. The group spent two months in Seoul recording the "Dynamite" music video and took lessons with the choreographer of the hit song "Gangnam Style", Ju Sun Lee.

=== 2015: disbandment ===
In 2015, the official breakup of Champs was announced by JS Entertainment in a letter that they would not continue with the group due to local problems.
