= Raina (singer) =

South Korean singer

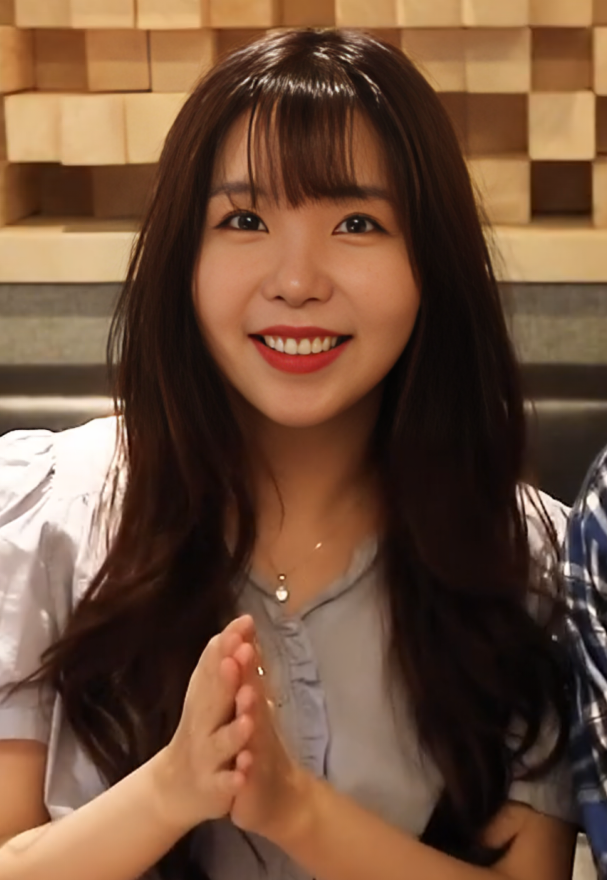
- Raina in July 2021

Background information
- Born: May 7, 1989 (age 36); Ulsan, South Korea
- Genres: K-pop; R&B
- Occupation: Singer
- Years active: 2009–present
- Label: Aer Music
- Formerly of: After School; Orange Caramel

Korean name
- Hangul: 오혜린
- Hanja: 吳惠麟
- RR: O Hyerin
- MR: O Hyerin

Oh Hye-rin (Korean: 오혜린), known professionally as Raina (레이나), is a South Korean singer. She is best known as a former member of the South Korean girl group After School and member of the sub-unit Orange Caramel. Raina debuted with the group in November 2009 following the release of the group's third single, "Because of You". She debuted as a solo singer in September 2014 with the single "You End, And Me".

== Career ==
=== Predebut ===
Raina tried to audition with JYP Entertainment to become a rapper before joining Pledis Entertainment. Before debut, Raina was a barista at the Coffee Bean & Tea Leaf. She also previously auditioned for Mnet's Superstar K and was a student at the SM Academy. Raina is considered to be one of the best vocalists among idol girl groups in South Korea.

=== 2009–2014: Debut with After School and Orange Caramel ===
Raina officially debuted with After School for the release of their second single, "Because of You", which attained No. 1 on the Gaon Digital Chart and won the "triple crown" on SBS Inkigayo. She debuted in After School's sub-unit Orange Caramel on June 18, 2010, on KBS Music Bank with the song "Magic Girl". She released her first solo single for the My Shining Girl OST in February 2012. Raina has written lyrics for Orange Caramel's "Still..." and "In this Place". Raina also wrote the lyrics for After School's "Love Love Love" and "Timeless".

=== 2014–present: Solo career ===
On June 12, 2014, Raina and rapper San E released an R&B duet called "A Midsummer Night's Sweetness". The collaboration topped all major music charts in South Korea soon after it was released, and it was No. 4 on the year-end Gaon Digital Chart.

In October 2014, Raina became the first After School member to make a solo debut with the release her solo single titled "Reset", which was released on October 8. The single consists of title track "You End, and Me" and b-side track "Repertoire".

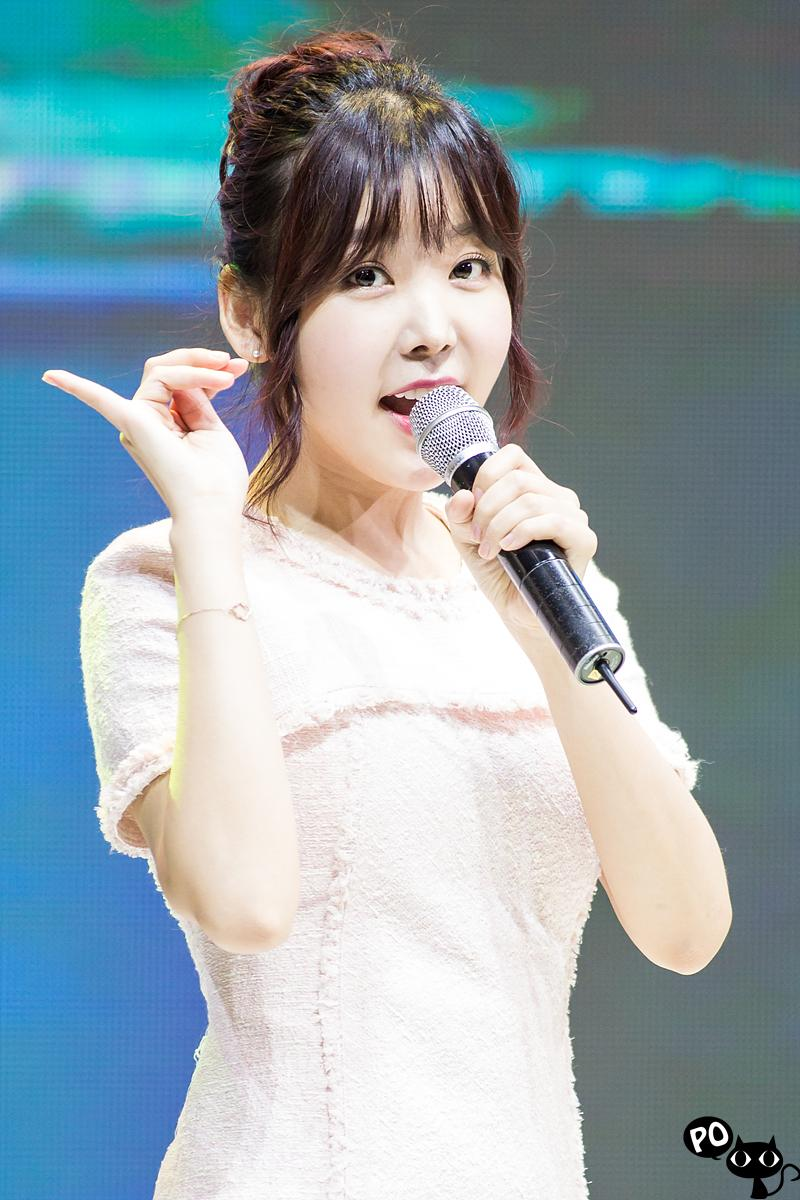
Raina performing in 2015

Raina released her second digital single titled "I Don't Know" on November 24, 2015.

On June 16, 2016, Raina and rapper San E released their second duet, called "Sugar and Me".

On June 5, 2017, Raina released her third OST titled When Rain Falls for MBC's drama Lookout; fellow After School member E-young participated in lyric-writing, composition and arrangement for the track. Raina released her first single album, Loop on July 31. The single album contains three tracks, with title track "Loop" featuring NU'EST's Aron.

In August 2018, Raina released the single "It's Okay" as part of a project single with producer Bumzu. Subsequently, on September 5, 2018, Raina's soundtrack single entitled "Home" was released as the fifth OST for SBS' drama Your Honor. On December 17, 2019, it was shared that Raina had left Pledis following the expiration of her contract.

Following her departure from Pledis, Raina has yet to join an agency. In April 2020 Raina participated in her first project since leaving Pledis as a member of the X-MAS project in which she released her version of Lena Park's "Ann" (앤). To much excitement of fans, Raina released her next OST for KBS's Once Again alongside former Myteen member and Produce X 101 contestant Song Yuvin, called "Love is Danger". Since then, Raina has been announced as part of the line-up for MBN's female idol revival show Miss Back hosted by Baek Ji-young.

On December 4, 2021, Raina signed a contract with Aer Music.

== Discography ==
=== Single albums ===
Title	Album details	Peak chart positions
Title	Album details	KOR
Reset	Released: October 10, 2014; Label: Pledis Entertainment; Formats: CD, digital download; Track listing: 1. You End, And Me (장난인거 알아) (feat. Kanto); 2. Repertoire (레파토리)	—
Loop	Released: July 31, 2017; Label: Pledis Entertainment; Formats: CD, digital download; Track listing: 1. Loop (밥 영화 카페) feat. Aron of NU'EST; 2. Your Day (맡겨줘); 3. Treat You Better (같이 있고 싶어)	41
"—" denotes releases that did not chart.

=== Singles ===
Title	Year	Peak chart positions	Sales (DL)	Album
Title	Year	KOR	Sales (DL)	Album
"A Midsummer Night's Sweetness" (with San E)	2014	1	KOR: 2,176,748	Non-album single
"You End, And Me" (장난인거 알아) (feat. Kanto)	2014	25	KOR: 142,407	Reset
"Don't Know" (모르겠다)	2015	69		Non-album singles
"Sugar and Me" (달고나) (with San E)	2016	5	KOR: 454,350	Non-album singles
"Loop" (밥 영화 카페) (feat. Aron of NU'EST)	2017	55	KOR: 33,454	Loop
"It's Okay" (작아지는 중)	2018	—	—N/a	Non-album single
"Ann" (앤)	2020	—	—N/a	X-MAS Project Vol.3
"Piggyback Ride" (어부바) (with Nada)	2020	—	—N/a	MBN Miss Back Part.2
"tantara" (with Nada & Soyul (Crayon Pop))	2020	—	—N/a	MBN Miss Back Part.4
"Winter Fantasy" with Dalsooobin, Sera, Gayoung, Soyul (Crayon Pop), Nada & Jung Yujin (The Ark)	2020	—	—N/a	MBN Miss Back Part.5
"Can We Break Up?" (헤어질 수 있을까) with Junggigo	2021	— (Note: "Can We Break Up?" did not enter Gaon Digital Chart, but peaked at number 106 on the component Gaon Download Chart.)	—N/a	MBN Miss Back Part.7
"Finale" with Sera, Dalsooobin, Gayoung, Soyul (Crayon Pop), Nada & Jung Yujin (The Ark)	2021	—	—N/a	MBN Miss Back Part.9
"We Are The One" with Sera, Dalsooobin, Gayoung, Soyul (Crayon Pop), Nada & Jung Yujin (The Ark)	2021	—	—N/a	MBN Miss Back Part.9
"A Midsummer Night's Sweetness: Summer Again" (with San E)	2021	68	—N/a	A Midsummer Night's Sweetness: Summer Again (TEN PROJECT Part.3)
"Morning Aroma" (아침향기)	2022	—	—N/a	Project 'Hwaeum': Morning Scent with Raina
"Just like us back then" (그때 우리처럼)	2023	— (Note: "Just like us back then" did not enter Circle Digital Chart, but peaked at number 107 on the component Circle Download Chart.)	—N/a	Non-album single
Soundtrack appearances
"Glowing" (자체발광) (feat. Man Seong)	2012	97	—N/a	Glowing She OST Part 2
"Faraway"	2012	—	—N/a	Glowing She OST Part 2
"Stay Weird Stay Different" (이상하자) (with Hanhae, feat. Verbal Jint)	2015	—	—N/a	Stay Weird Stay Different OST
"When Rain Falls" (주르륵)	2017	—	—N/a	The Guardians OST Part 3
"Home"	2018	—	—N/a	Your Honor OST Part 5
"LOVE IS DANGER" (with Song Yuvin)	2020	—	—N/a	Once Again OST Part 4
"Waiting For You " (오늘 연락해)	2021	—	—N/a	How to Be Thirty OST Part 1
"Endless Night" (끝나지 않는 밤)	2022	—	—N/a	Café Minamdang OST Part 3
"Angel Wings" (그린나래)	2023	—	—N/a	Oh! Youngsim OST Part 3
"Enduring Long And Clumsily" (한참을 서툴고 한참을 견디며)	2023	—	—N/a	CEO-dol Mart OST Part 3
"—" denotes releases that did not chart.

=== Other songs ===
Title	Year	Album
"Allday Allnight" (볼래) (with Jakops, ₩uNo, Day Day)	2015	XXX Digital Single
"Forgotten Season" (잊혀진 계절)	2015	King of Mask Singer Volume 34
"You in My Imagination" (상상 속의 너) (with Lizzy)	2016	Two Yoo Project Sugar Man Part 13
"By My Side"	2016	Melody to Masterpiece Track 1
"Jingle Jingle Jingle Bells" (징글징글징글벨) (feat. Z.NU)	2016	Sing For You
"Once" (한 때) (Bumzu feat. Raina)	2017	Non-album single
"When autumn comes" (가을이 오면)	2019	Project 10
"Merry Merry Christmas Day" (메리메리크리스마스데이) (among Aer Music artists)	2021	2021 Christmas Story

== Theater ==
Year	Title	Role	Ref.
2022	Again, Oh Hae-Young	Oh Hae-young	

== Awards and nominations ==
=== Mnet Asian Music Awards ===
Year	Nominee / work	Award	Result
2014	San E & Raina – "A Midsummer Night's Sweetness"	Song of the Year	Nominated
2014	San E & Raina – "A Midsummer Night's Sweetness"	Best Collaboration	Nominated

=== Melon Music Awards ===
Year	Nominee / work	Award	Result
2014	San E & Raina – "A Midsummer Night's Sweetness"	Song of the Year	Nominated
2014	San E & Raina – "A Midsummer Night's Sweetness"	Hot Trend Award	Nominated
2014	San E & Raina – "A Midsummer Night's Sweetness"	Rap/Hip Hop	Won

=== Golden Disc Awards ===
Year	Nominee / work	Award	Result
2015	San E & Raina – "A Midsummer Night's Sweetness"	Digital Bonsang	Nominated

=== Seoul Music Awards ===
Year	Nominee / work	Award	Result
2014	San E & Raina – "A Midsummer Night's Sweetness"	Hip Hop/Rap Award	Won

=== Gaon Chart K-Pop Awards ===
Year	Nominee / work	Award	Result
2014	San E & Raina – "A Midsummer Night's Sweetness"	Artist of the Year – July	Won
