= Gwacheon Line =

Railway line in South Korea

Overview
- Native name: 과천선
- Status: Operational
- Owner: Government of South Korea
- Locale: Gyeonggi Province
- Stations: 10

Service
- Type: Rapid transit
- System: Seoul Metropolitan Subway
- Services: Line 4
- Operator: Korail

History
- Opened: 15 January 1993

Technical
- Line length: 14.4 km
- Number of tracks: 2
- Track gauge: 1,435 mm (4 ft 8 1/2 in) standard gauge
- Electrification: 1,500 V DC & 25 kV AC (60 Hz)

- Gwacheon Line
- Hangul: 과천선
- Hanja: 果川線
- RR: Gwacheonseon
- MR: Kwach'ŏnsŏn

Gwacheon Line is a metropolitan rail line operated by Korail in Gyeonggi Province, South Korea. All trains is operated as a through service into Seoul Metro's Line 4 and Ansan Line on the other end.

From January 15, 1993, to March 31, 1994, the Seoul Metropolitan Subway Line 1 operated through the Ansan Line, and since the opening of all sections on April 1, 1994, it has been operated as a part of the Metropolitan Subway Line 4.

== Stations ==
Station; Number	Station Name; English	Station Name; Hangul	Station Name; Hanja	Transfer	Location
↑ Through-services to/from Oido via Ansan Line ↑
443	Geumjeong	금정	衿井	Seoul Subway Line 1	Gunpo, Gyeonggi
442	Beomgye	범계			Anyang Dongan, Gyeonggi
441	Pyeongchon	평촌	坪村		Anyang Dongan, Gyeonggi
440	Indeogwon	인덕원	仁德院	(2026); Indeogwon–Dongtan Line (2026)	Anyang Dongan, Gyeonggi
TBD	Gwacheon Bio Information Technology Zone (2027)	과천지식정보단지	果川知識情報團地驛		Gwacheon, Gyeonggi
439	Government Complex Gwacheon	정부과천청사	政府果川廳舍		Gwacheon, Gyeonggi
438	Gwacheon	과천	果川		Gwacheon, Gyeonggi
437	Seoul Grand Park	대공원	大公園		Gwacheon, Gyeonggi
436	Seoul Racecourse Park	경마공원	競馬公園		Gwacheon, Gyeonggi
435	Seonbawi	선바위			Gwacheon, Gyeonggi
434	Namtaeryeong	남태령	南泰嶺		Seocho District, Seoul
↓ Through-services to/from Danggogae via Seoul Subway Line 4 ↓

== Future ==
As a transportation measure for Gwacheon Information Town Station, a residential and industrial complex being built in the Galhyeon-dong area of Gwacheon-si, a new station is being built between Indeokwon and Gwacheon Government Complex, with the goal of opening in 2027. In addition, it is said that they are pushing forward with the installation of an evacuation track at Gwacheon Government Complex Station and Daegongwon Station as part of the promotion of the Line 4 express extension.

== Criticisms ==
=== Noise and frequent operation delays ===
The Gwacheon Line, along with the Bundang Line which was completed around the same time, was given the nickname of "Noise Line" due to the inappropriate design of the concrete finish in their tunnels.

Before passenger use of the line commenced, the Seoul Metro Corporation ran a series of test runs on the Gwacheon and Ansan Lines, but they led to a series of operation delays due to reasons such as confusing the change in electric current that occurs in the rest of Line 4. Furthermore, the new trains that were deployed for the opening of the Gwacheon Line, the Korail Class 341000 and the Seoul Metro 4000 series, used VVVF inverters instead of the chopper controls that were used until that point, which meant that a sufficient period of test runs was needed. However, the trains were put into service without enough test runs, unbeknownst that there was an issue with the new trains' circuitry. The Korail Class 341000 trains ended up causing 15 incidents within the first 6 days of operation, and the Seoul Metro 4000 series trains also caused 3 incidents within the first month of operation. Due to the frequency of the incidents, Korail (then the Railroad Administration Bureau) stopped the operation of some trains while their faulty parts were replaced, and the Seoul Metro Corporation also replaced faulty parts on 3 of their trains.

== See also ==
- Subways in South Korea
- Seoul Subway Line 4
