= Gwacheon Police Station =

Police station in South Korea

Coordinates: 37°25′46″N 126°59′24″E

Gwacheon Police Station is one of the police stations under the jurisdiction of the Gyeonggi Southern Provincial Police Agency in South Korea. It has jurisdiction over the Gwacheon area of Gyeonggi Province including Gwanak Mountain. It is located at 20 Tongyeong-ro (Jungang-dong), Gwacheon-si, Gyeonggi Province.

The chief shall be reported to the superintendent.

== Basic Information ==
- Address: 20 Tongyeong-ro, Gwacheon-si, Gyeonggi-do
- Postal Code: 13807

== Substations, Branch offices and their jurisdiction ==
Gwacheon Police Station has two district police stations under its jurisdiction.

Substations	Photo	Address	Jurisdiction	Branch offices
Gwacheon substation		136 Gwanmun-ro (Jungang-dong)	Jungang-dong, Burim-dong, Gwanmun-dong, Gwacheeon-dong, Juam-dong, Makgye-dong	Seon-am Branch; Seoul Grand Park Branch
Byeoryang substation		58 Byeorang-ro (Byeoryang-dong)	Byeoryang-dong, Galhyeon-dong, Munwon-dong, Wonmun-dong	

== Incidents ==
=== 2024 Raid on the National Election Commission Headquarters and Gwacheon Police Station Investigation ===
In December 2024, following President Yoon Suk Yeol's declaration of emergency martial law, some 300 martial law troops forcibly entered and occupied the National Election Commission's headquarters in Gwacheon for over three hours, confiscating officials' phones and sealing off the building's perimeter. The NEC formally condemned the action as "a clear violation of the Constitution" and noted that the incursion appeared aimed at gathering evidence for unsubstantiated claims of rigging in the April 2024 parliamentary elections. A subsequent months-long probe by the Gwacheon Police Station found no evidence of electoral fraud and determined there was insufficient basis to forward the case to prosecutors.

== See also ==
- ko:경기도남부경찰청
