= Seoul Land =

Amusement park in Gwacheon, South Korea

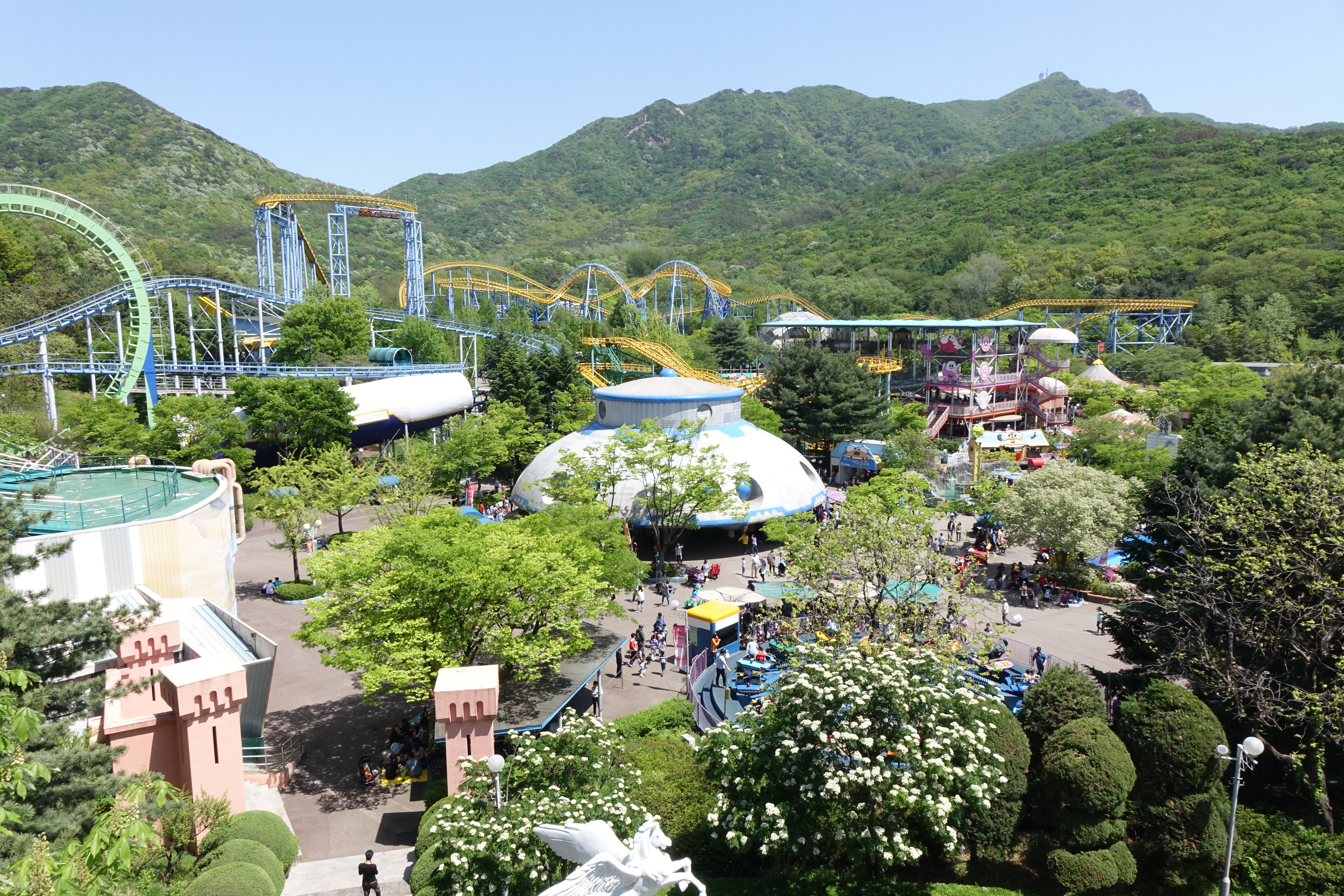
- The park in 2015
- Interactive map of Seoul Land
- Location: Gwacheon, South Korea
- Coordinates: 37°26′3.17″N 127°1′11.91″E
- Opened: 1988
- Visitors: 3.5 million/year
- Status: operating
- Website: English page

Seoul Land (Korean: 서울랜드) is an amusement park opened in 1988, in Gwacheon, a city in Gyeonggi-do province, South Korea. Located in the Seoul Grand Park complex, it opened just before the 1988 Summer Olympics. It has about 40 rides, including roller coasters and movie theaters. Seasonal festivals are held in the park. It is smaller than Everland, but closer to Seoul, about one hour away from downtown Seoul. Approximately 3–3.5 million people visit the park each a year. Roughly a third of its 300,000 m^{2} is green space, the rest being packed with attractions.

== Description ==
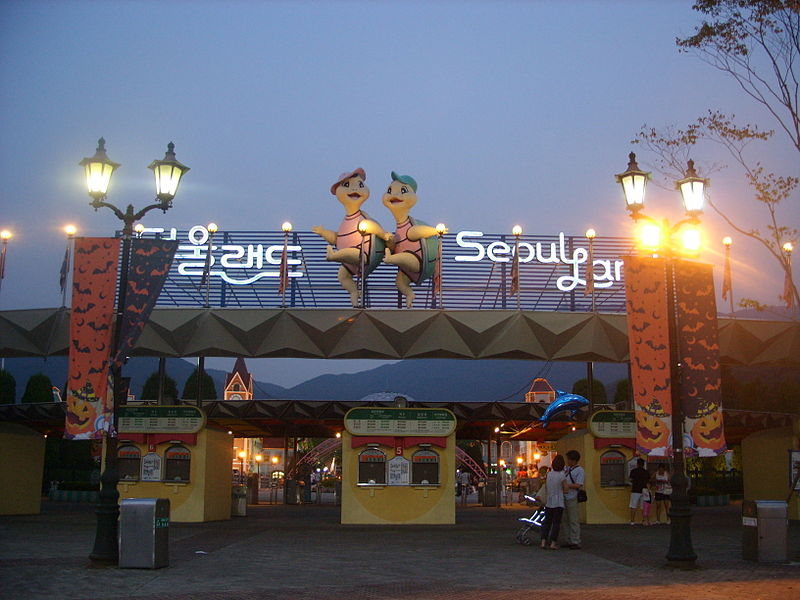
Park entrance in 2008

Seoul Land, Seoul Grand Park, and the main branch of the National Museum of Modern and Contemporary Art are all located in the Seoul Grand Park complex. Visitors may buy general admission tickets or one-day unlimited passes. General admission allows free entry to most rides. The unlimited passes allow almost all rides to be taken for free, but exhibitions, performances, and certain other attractions have additional charges despite the unlimited pass. Children aged 2 and under are allowed in for free. Prices for other ages are as follows:

| Admission Type | | Adult | Youth | Child |
|---|---|---|---|---|
| Admission Type | | 19 and up | 13-18 | 3-12 |
| One-Day Unlimited Pass | Day | KRW 52,000 | KRW 46,000 | KRW 43,000 |
| One-Day Unlimited Pass | Night | KRW 45,000 | KRW 39,000 | KRW 36,000 |

== Attractions ==
Seoul Land has five themed areas containing rides, arcades, obstacle courses, and other attractions. Many of the rides are themed with popular animation characters, such as Larva.

=== World Plaza ===
- Kids Land (for children)
- Game World coin-operated video game arcade

=== Adventure Land ===
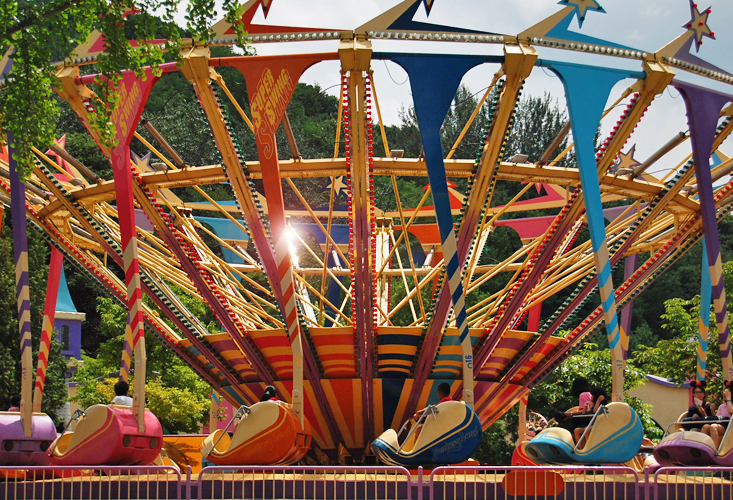
A ride in the park (2010)

- Shooting Range
- Ninano Go Kart
- Remote Control Boats
- Sky Adventure (Beginner)
- Sky Adventure (Challenger)
- Flume Ride
- Den of Lost Thieves
- Tikitoc Train A small, steel roller coaster for children. It runs about 16 km/h (10 mph).
- King Viking A swinging gondola-type ride. This type of ride is well known in South Korea, and Lotte World and Everland have similar rides.

=== Character Town (Fantasy Land) ===
- IQ Arcade coin-operated video game arcade
- Midway Games coin-operated video game arcade
- Turning Mecard Go! Bumper Car (for children)
- Peter Pan
- Kambu Airplane
- Arpo Swing
- Larva Twister
- Canimal Circus It is a 360-degree revolution ride, and it turns around back and forth. (over 130cm)
- Water Walk
- Seoul Land Kraken Island
- Character 3D Theater
- Convoy Race (for children)
- Musical Carousel
- Turning Mecard Racing
- World Cup Ten soccer ball-shaped dishes round and round in the sky. (over 130cm)
- Kartrider Bumper
- Big Merry-Go-Round
- Cloud Bread (for children)
- Vroomiz Hill (for children)
- Tobot Train (for children) Formerly known as Saseum Sseolmae ("Reindeer Sleigh"). It is a powered, steel roller coaster made by Zamperla and designed for children. One ride is 56 seconds long. It opened in 1990 and still operates.

=== Tomorrow Land ===
- X Flyer A Kamikaze ride made by Vekoma.
- Zeppelin
- Rock Cafe
- Crazy House
- Motion Theater
- Super Wings
- Alice Wonder House
- Time Machine 5D 360
- Frog Hopper (for children) A miniature Double Shot-style tower-based ride for children.
- Mini Viking (for children) A pirate-ship-style ride for children.
- Crazy Mouse Wild Mouse roller coaster. Steel coaster made by Senyo Kogyo. The top speed is 28 mph and one ride is 1 minute and 22 seconds.
- Sky X One of the most popular rides at Seoul Land, Sky X requires reservations and has additional charges. On the ride, groups of two or three people are raised 50 meters off the ground by cable and then dropped.
- Shot X Drop A tower-based ride similar to the Double Shot.
- Black Hole 2000 Steel coaster made by Senyo Kogyo with two corkscrews, seven drops, and top speed of 85 km/h (52.8 mph). One ride is 2 minutes and 45 seconds long, 15 seconds shorter than the T Express at Everland. It opened in 1990 and still operates.
- Columbia Double Loop Coaster Also known as the "Double Loop Coaster", the Double Loop Coaster is a steel coaster made by Senyo Kogyo. It has two loops, and one ride lasts 2 minutes and 15 seconds. The top speed is 52 mph. It opened in 1988 and still operates.

=== Samchulli ("Thousand-Mile") Hill ===
- Outdoor Pool
- Larva Sledding Hill
- Best Kids (for children)
- Archery Range
- Top Spin Called "Dokkaebi Wind" in Korean, this is a standard Top Spin, comparable to the Double Rock Spin at Everland. The highlight of this attraction is rotating air in six consecutive times. You can feel the thrill while driving 6 times continuously in the air. (over 140cm)
- Haunted House

=== Closed attractions ===
- Sudden Attack This is a real-life simulation of the "Warehouse" map from the FPS game Sudden Attack, which is popular in Korea.
- Dragon Tank
- Hutos Media Town Currently refurbished into Best Kids.

== Exhibits ==
Seoul Land hosts a variety of temporary exhibits. These have included:

- Early 2008: a Creation Science exhibit, organized by the Korea Association for Creation Research (KACR), which was visited by over 116,000 visitors during its three-month run.

== See also ==
- Everland
- Lotte World
- Children's Grand Park, Seoul
