= Seonbawi station =

Train station in South Korea

Coordinates: 37.45159°N 127.00226°E

선바위; Seonbawi
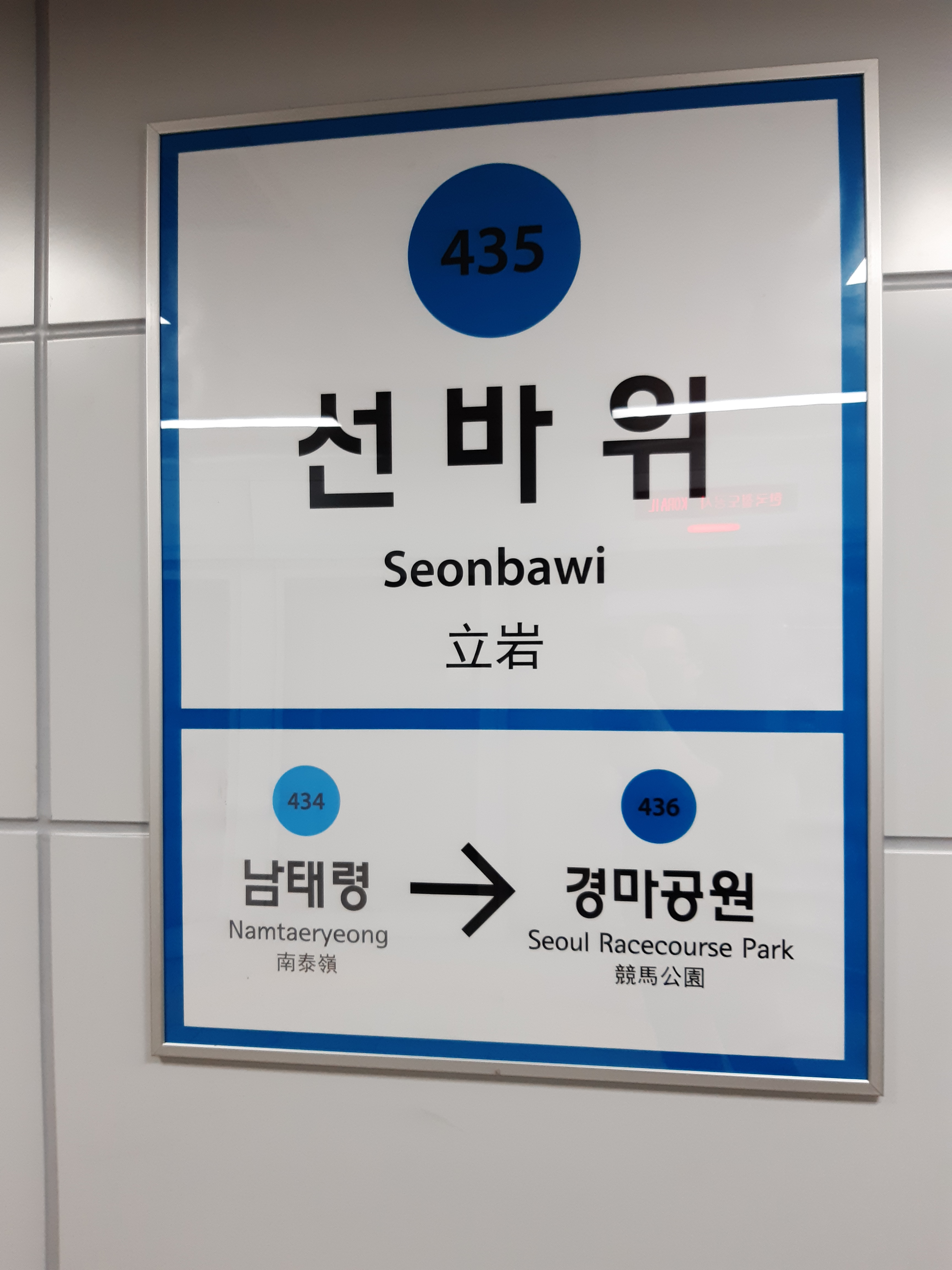

Korean name
- Hangul: 선바위역
- Hanja: 선바위驛
- Revised Romanization: Seonbawi-yeok
- McCune–Reischauer: Sŏnbawi-yŏk

General information
- Location: 351-7 Gwacheon-dong, Gwacheon-si, Gyeonggi-do
- Operated by: Korail
- Line: Gwacheon Line
- Platforms: 2
- Tracks: 2

Construction
- Structure type: Underground

History
- Opened: April 1, 1994

Services
Preceding station	Seoul Metropolitan Subway	Following station
Namtaeryeong towards Jinjeop	Line 4	Seoul Racecourse Park towards Oido
Location

Seonbawi Station is a station on Seoul Subway Line 4 in Gwacheon, Gyeonggi-do. Most of its passengers use the station as a transfer point between various buses and Line 4. Besides a few bus stops, there really is not much else in the vicinity of this station.

== Station layout ==
G	Street level	Exit

L1; Concourse	Lobby	Customer Service, Shops, Vending machines, ATMs

L2; Platforms	Side platform, doors will open on the left
L2; Platforms	Southbound	Gwacheon Line toward Oido (Seoul Racecourse Park) →
L2; Platforms	Northbound	← Gwacheon Line toward Jinjeop (Namtaeryeong)
L2; Platforms	Side platform, doors will open on the left
