= Gwacheon Foreign Language High School =

Coordinates: 37°25′54″N 126°59′18″E

Gwacheon Foreign Language High School Korean: 과천외국어고등학교
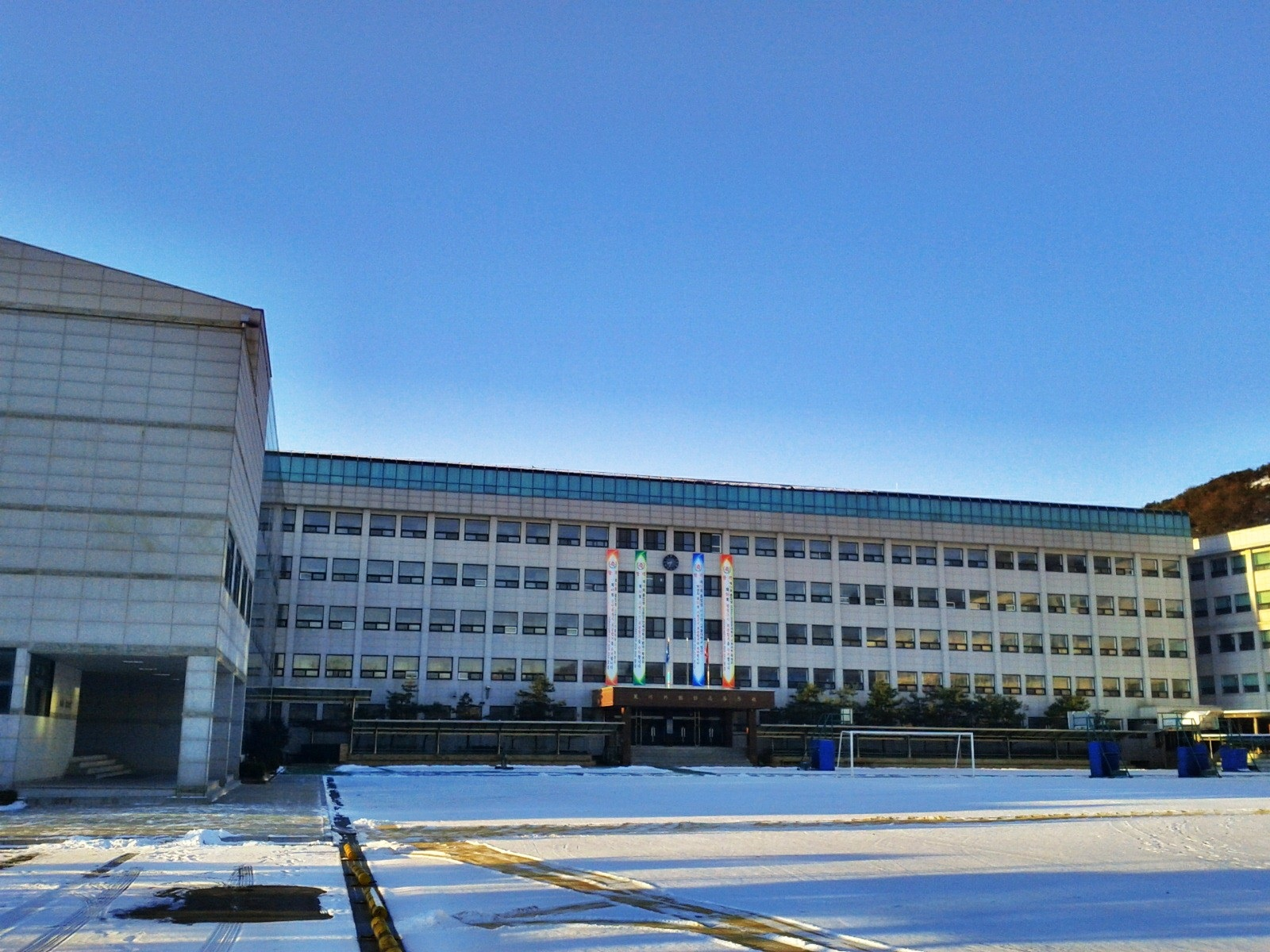

Location
- Huimang-gil 36; Gwacheon-si, Gyeonggi Province 427-805; Korea, Republic of

Information
- Funding type: Independent
- Motto: 건전인, 협력인, 성취인; Students who have sound mind, Students who know how to collaborate with others, Students who achieve goals. (unofficial)
- Established: 1990
- Principal: Lee Chung Sil(이충실)
- Mascot: Tree : Pine, Flower : Orchid
- Newspaper: Yulmok (율목)
- Website: www.gcfl.or.kr

Gwacheon Foreign Language High school (Korean: 과천외국어고등학교, 과천외고) is an Independent High School located in Gyeong-gi province, Gwacheon-si, South Korea. The school was established on 5 May 1990 and It is the first Foreign Language High School established in Gyeonggi Province.
Gwacheon Foreign Language High school is a special high school in South Korea. Students in this school would be able to learn foreign languages in more details compared to students in ordinary high school.
'Kwacheon Foreign Language High School' is an old name which was used before the revision of Korean romanization.

== Departments ==
- English major (4 classes)
  - Second major Japanese (2 classes)
  - Second major Chinese (2 classes)
- Chinese major (2 classes)
- Japanese major (2 classes)
- French major (1 class)
- German major (1 class)

== Enrollment ==
GCFL has a total enrollment of over 600 students. Primarily, Applications are accepted based on Middle school English scores. After that, Students conduct an interview based on their Curriculum vitae. With the overall score accumulated during these two phases, the school announces the final successful applicants. Some departments are harder to get into than others, as some languages are considered more useful or easier to learn than others.

== Student life ==
=== Events ===
- Yulmokje (율목제) - Festival held biennially by students, clubs, and teachers.
- Formation process of Socialization (사회화 형성 과정) - Lecture held several times each year to educate students. Usually its talkers are graduates.
- Yulmok debating championship (율목 토론 대회)

=== Extra-curricular activities ===
The school's Extra-curricular activities has evolved over the years. Now GCFL has over 40 Extra-curricular activities clubs.

==== Clubs ====
- ERES-TU - Glee club
- School Ambassador K.I.N.G - Promotion team, King Is New GCFL, Promote the school to middle school students
- Students' Union 秀 - Student Council, Volunteers for entire school, holds students' conference.
- RABS (Rab And BE Satisfied)
- PCGS - Fashion Model & Design Club
- KFBS - Broadcasting department, plans and broadcasts school Radio program.
- BreathLess - Instrumentalists' club. Usually performs in school festival '율목제'.
- INTERACT - International Volunteer Club
- STOPMIC - Photography club.
- GAONNURI (가온누리, Heart of the world) - KoreanSamul nori club.
- Seo-Yi-Seong-Rak (서이성락) - Publishes 'Yulmok' biennially, the entirely student-run yearbook.
- Chamarom (참아롬) - Publishes Biannual School newspaper.
- KPEC - Kwacheon Practical English club.
- Nouvelle Vague - movie making club. 'Nouvelle Vague' means 'New wave of the movie'.
- VANK
- semtle - hacking club.
- A2D - Dance Club
- KYPF - Korean youth political forum
- MUNERS - practicing Model United Nation

==== Academic teams ====
- K.H.D.C has British Parliament style debate, Model United Nations and Model Congress activities.
- YUPAD - Youth Union of Politics And Diplomacy
- KPEC (Kwacheon Practical English Club) - Publishes their own English textbooks, also has British Parliament style debate and Model Congress activities. In KPEC, the members will get together and make lyrics, script etc. and enjoy watching American movies or drama. It also plans to go out and have some activities like introducing Korean culture.
- Heart Of Writing (하오라) - English Essay Writing Club
- Muners - Model united nations

==== Sports ====
- Berserkers - School Soccer team
- SPIRE - School Basketball team
