= Namtaeryeong station =

Train station in South Korea

Coordinates: 37.46379°N 126.98912°E

남태령; Namtaeryeong
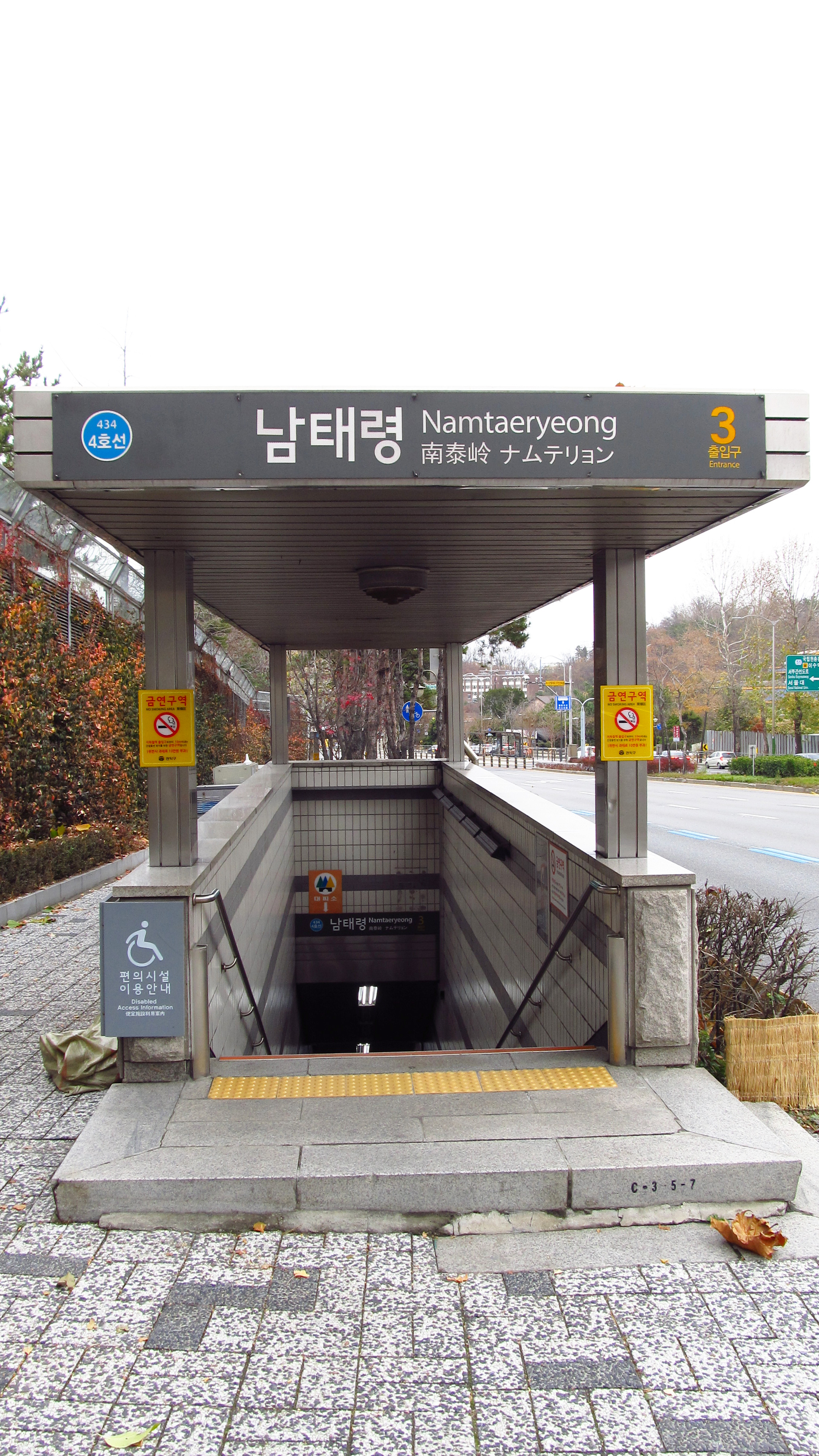
- Exit 3

Korean name
- Hangul: 남태령역
- Hanja: 南泰嶺驛
- Revised Romanization: Namtaeryeong-yeok
- McCune–Reischauer: Namt'aeryŏng-yŏk

General information
- Location: 2909 Bangbae 2-dong, Seocho-gu, Seoul
- Operator: Seoul Metro
- Line: Line 4
- Platforms: 1
- Tracks: 2

Construction
- Structure type: Underground

Key dates
- April 1, 1994: Line 4 opened
Location

Namtaeryeong Station is a station on Seoul Subway Line 4 in Seoul, Korea. It is operated by Seoul Metro. It is an island platform with two lines on one side, and a screen door is installed. There are 4 exits.

== Name ==
Its name means "great southern pass," referring to a passageway linking Seoul and Gwacheon, between Mt. Gwanak and Mt. Umyeon. The name came from the Choson Dynasty. Jeongjo of Joseon, the 22nd King of Choson, had gone to Hwaseong Fortress, Suwon, where Jeong-Jo's father was buried on. When Jeong-Jo came back to palace, he passed the hill named 'Fox Hill.' But King Jeong-Jo didn't know about this hill's name, and suddenly he saw one old man, so he asked to him "What is this hill's name?" So the old man answered "Oh lord! This hill's name is Namtaeryeong." However, the one vassal already knew what's this hill's real name; Fox Hill, so he contradicted the old man and said "No! This hill's name is Fox Hill." King Jeong-Jo wondered why the old man had lied to him. So the old man said "Actually fox is very vicious and sly animal, so I couldn't say the real name to you, because you are the King of us, so I couldn't make a mess to your name, I decided to tell you the better name Namtaeryeong, which means 'Great Hill located on Southern part,' instead of Fox Hill." King Jeong-Jo was impressed, and decided to change that hill's name Fox Hill to Namtaeryeong.

== History ==
Most provincial railways in South Korea were built with Japanese expertise while Korea was under Japanese rule. Trains still run on the left hand side of the track on these railways. But the Seoul Subway, which was constructed in the 1970s, ran on the right-hand track. Therefore, between Namtaeryeong and Seonbawi Stations, where the two lines connect, the underground tracks must cross over from right hand drive in Namtaeryeong to left hand drive in Seonbawi.

== Station layout ==
G	Street level	Exit
L1; Concourse	Lobby	Customer Service, Shops, Vending machines, ATMs
L2; Platforms	Northbound	← Line 4 toward Jinjeop (Sadang)
L2; Platforms	Island platform, doors will open on the left
L2; Platforms	Southbound	Gwacheon Line toward Oido (Seonbawi) →

== Gallery ==
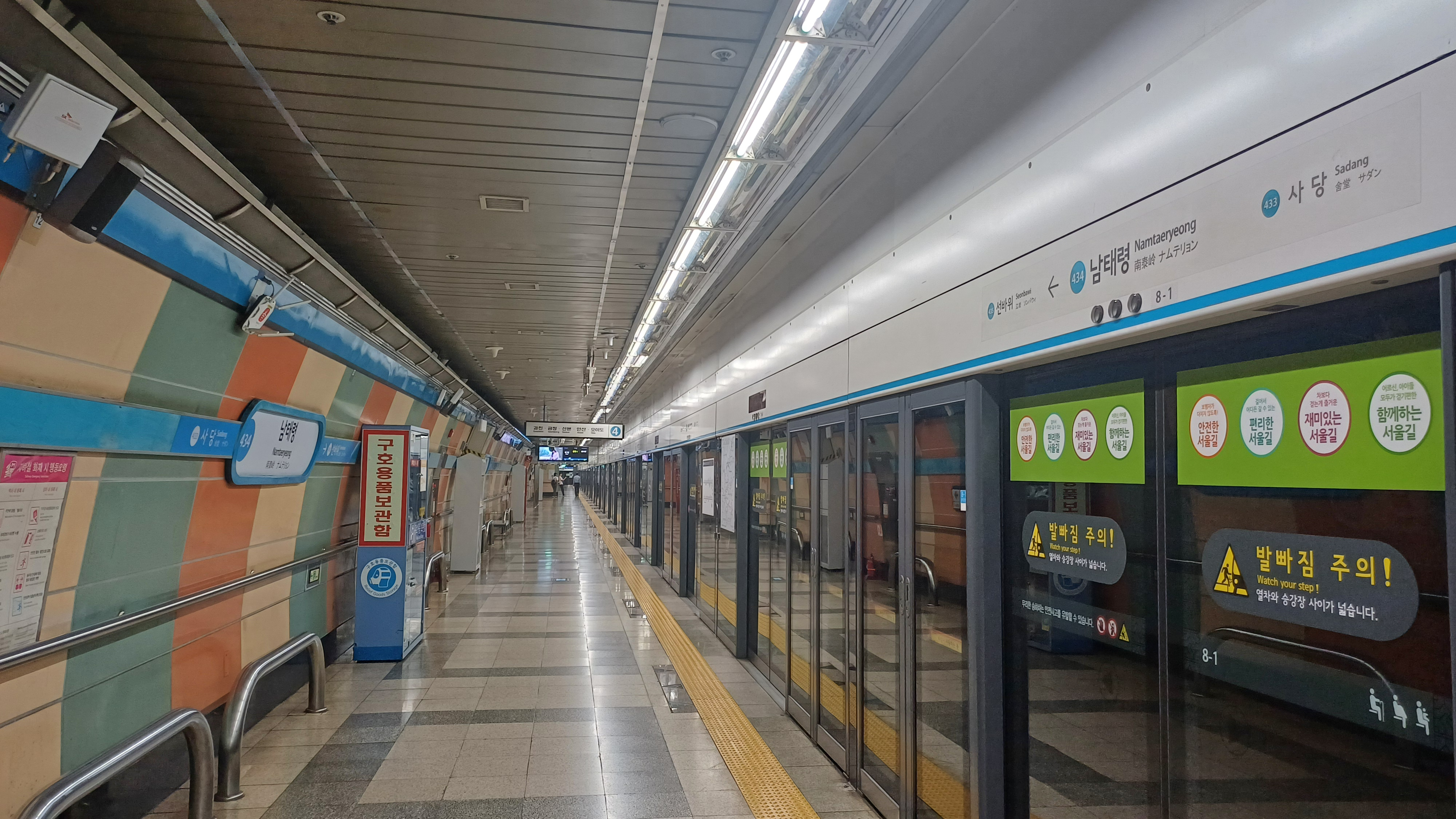
Platform

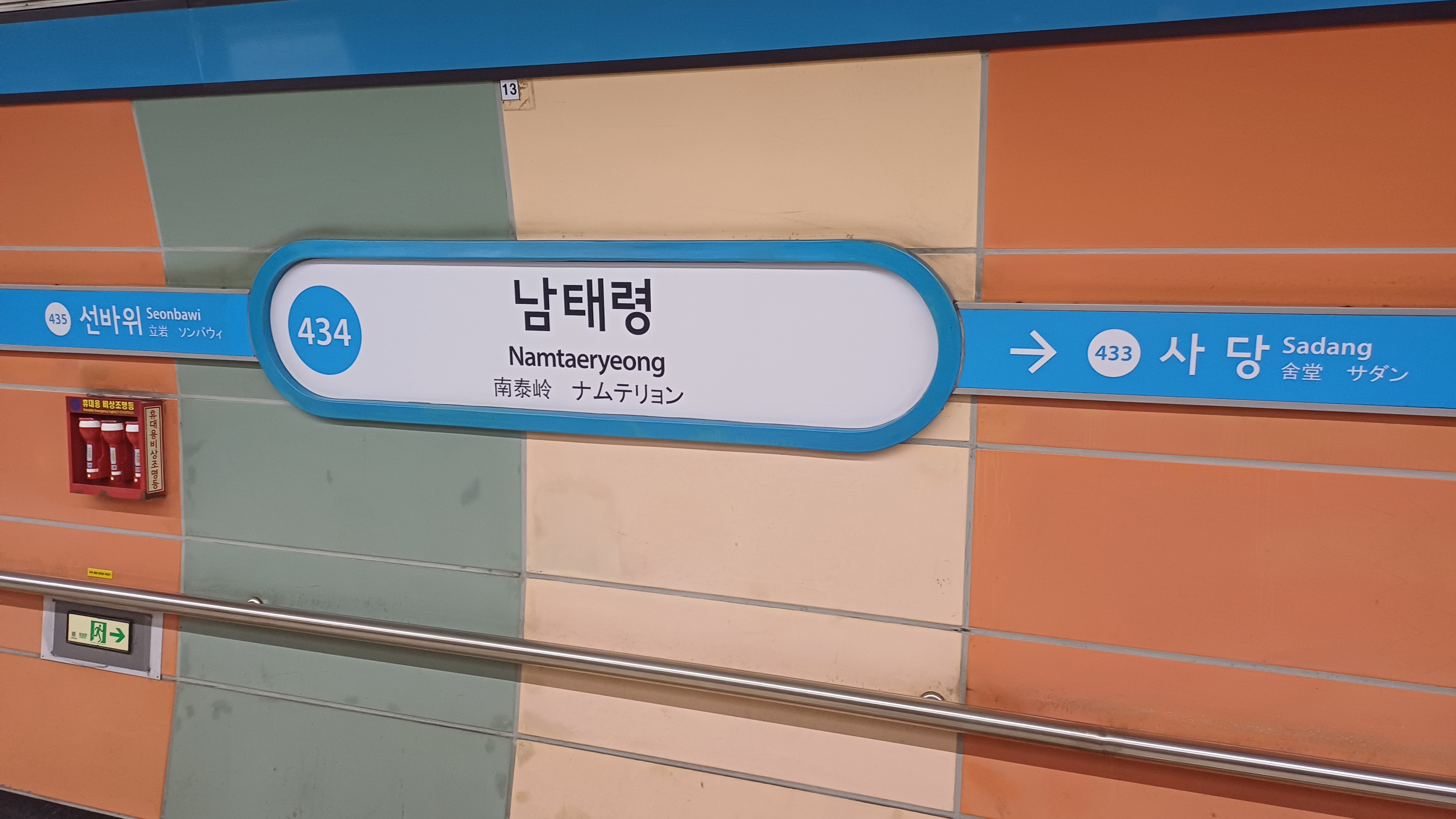
Station nameplate

Preceding station	Seoul Metropolitan Subway	Following station
Sadang towards Jinjeop	Line 4	Seonbawi towards Oido
