= Seoul Racecourse Park station =

Metro station in South Korea

Coordinates: 37.44403°N 127.00784°E

경마공원; Seoul Racecourse Park
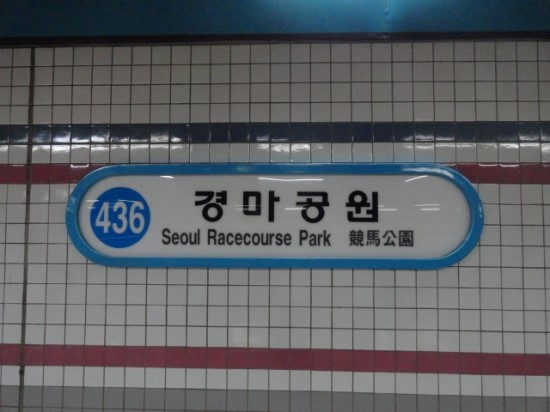

Korean name
- Hangul: 경마공원역
- Hanja: 競馬公園驛
- Revised Romanization: Gyeongmagong-won-yeok
- McCune–Reischauer: Kyŏngmagongwŏn-yŏk

General information
- Location: 646 Gwacheon-dong, Gwacheon-si, Gyeonggi-do
- Operated by: Korail
- Line: Line 4
- Platforms: 2
- Tracks: 2

Construction
- Structure type: Underground

Key dates
- April 1, 1994: Line 4 opened
Location

Seoul Racecourse Park Station is a station on Line 4 of the Seoul Subway. Its current name was given in 2000, before that it was called Gyeongmajang-yeok (경마장역, 競馬場驛). True to its name, it is located near LetsRun Park Seoul, a horse racing venue. It attracts large volumes of people, particularly on weekends when thousands of Seoulites flock to the races to bet on their favorite horses. This is apparent in the significant difference between the weekday and weekend passenger usage of this station.

The Golf Recreation Park is also accessible via Seoul Racecourse Park Station.

== Station layout ==
G	Street level	Exit

L1; Concourse	Lobby	Customer Service, Shops, Vending machines, ATMs

L2; Platforms	Side platform, doors will open on the left
L2; Platforms	Southbound	Gwacheon Line toward Oido (Seoul Grand Park) →
L2; Platforms	Northbound	← Gwacheon Line toward Jinjeop (Seonbawi)
L2; Platforms	Side platform, doors will open on the left

== Passengers ==
Station	Figure						
Station	2000	2001	2002	2003	2004	2005	2006
Line 4	5238	5647	6175	6043	5119	4679	4793

Preceding station	Seoul Metropolitan Subway	Following station
Seonbawi towards Jinjeop	Line 4	Seoul Grand Park towards Oido
