= Seoul Grand Park station =

Train station in South Korea

Coordinates: 37.43564°N 127.00651°E

대공원; Seoul Grand Park
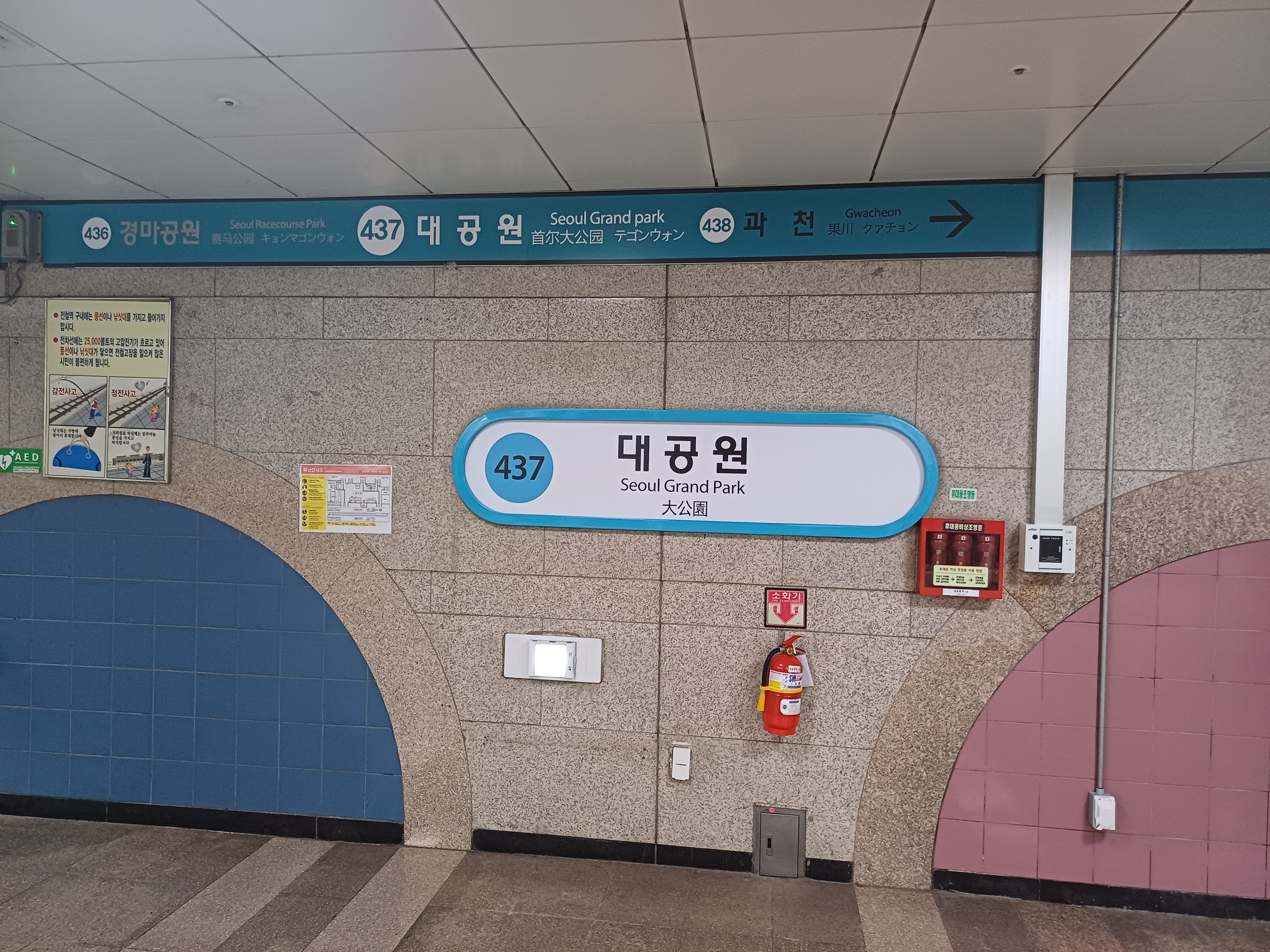

Korean name
- Hangul: 대공원역
- Hanja: 大公園驛
- Revised Romanization: Daegong-won-yeok
- McCune–Reischauer: Taegongwŏn-yŏk

General information
- Location: 727-1 Gwacheon-dong, Gwacheon-si, Gyeonggi-do
- Operator: Korail
- Line: Line 4
- Platforms: 2
- Tracks: 2

Construction
- Structure type: Underground

Key dates
- April 1, 1994: Line 4 opened
Location

Seoul Grand Park Station is a station on Line 4 of the Seoul Subway network.

A shuttle bus from the station runs to the Seoul Museum of Modern Art and the upper entrance to Seoul Grand Park.

== Station layout ==
G	Street level	Exit

L1; Concourse	Lobby	Customer Service, Shops, Vending machines, ATMs

L2; Platforms	Side platform, doors will open on the left
L2; Platforms	Southbound	Gwacheon Line toward Oido (Gwacheon) →
L2; Platforms	Northbound	← Gwacheon Line toward Jinjeop (Seoul Racecourse Park)
L2; Platforms	Side platform, doors will open on the left

Preceding station	Seoul Metropolitan Subway	Following station
Seoul Racecourse Park towards Jinjeop	Line 4	Gwacheon towards Oido
