= Gwacheon station =

Metro station in South Korea

Coordinates: 37.43299°N 126.99693°E

과천; Gwacheon
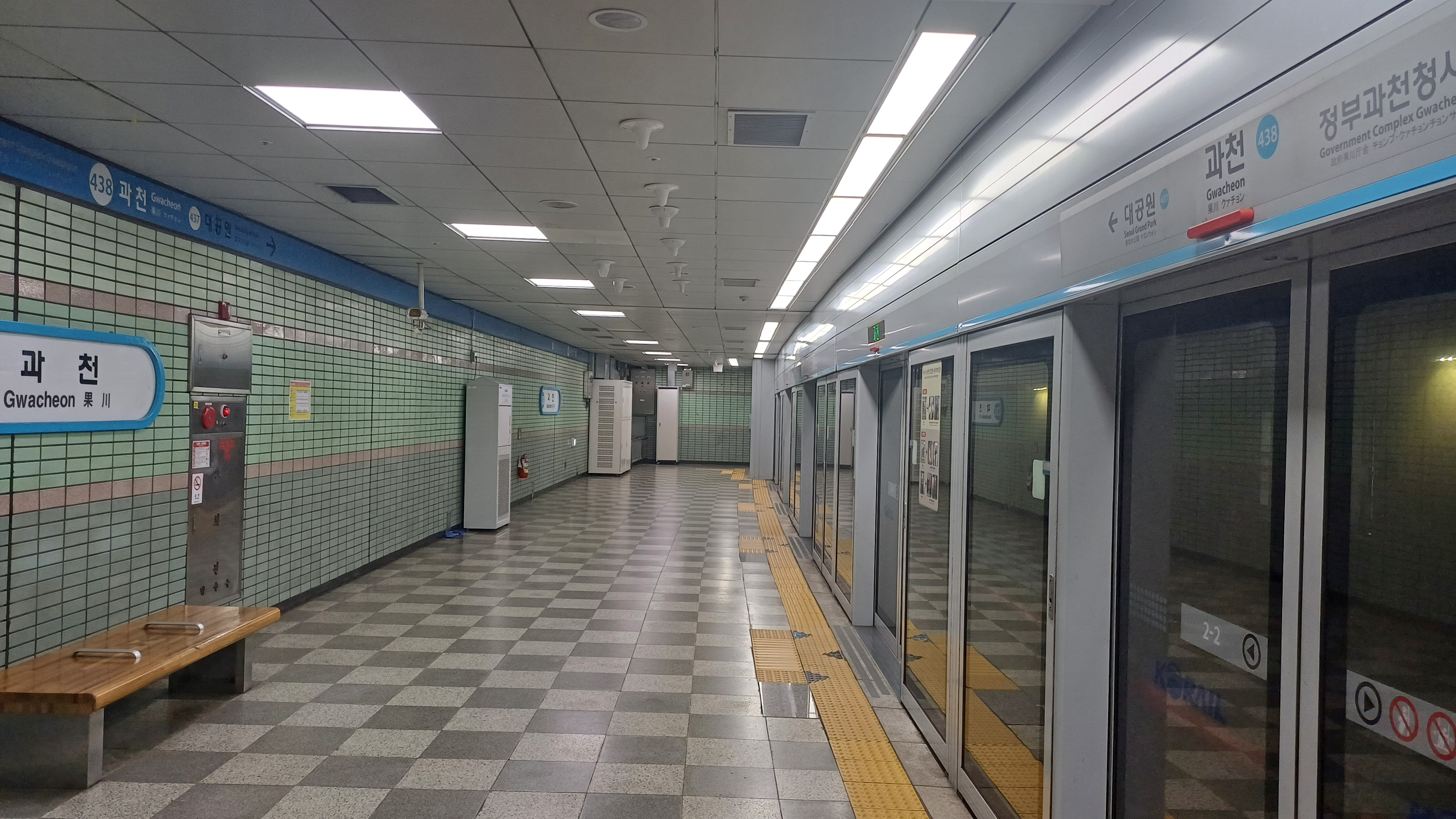

Korean name
- Hangul: 과천역
- Hanja: 果川驛
- Revised Romanization: Gwacheon-yeok
- McCune–Reischauer: Kwach'ŏn-yŏk

General information
- Location: 36 Doseogwan-gil, 2 Byeoryang-dong, Gwacheon-si, Gyeonggi-do
- Operator: Korail
- Line: Line 4
- Platforms: 2
- Tracks: 2

Construction
- Structure type: Underground

Key dates
- April 1, 1994: Line 4 opened
Location

Gwacheon Station (Korean: 과천역) is a station on the Seoul Subway Line 4 in South Korea. Despite its name, it is not the principal train station serving the city of Gwacheon; the next station on Line 4 is.

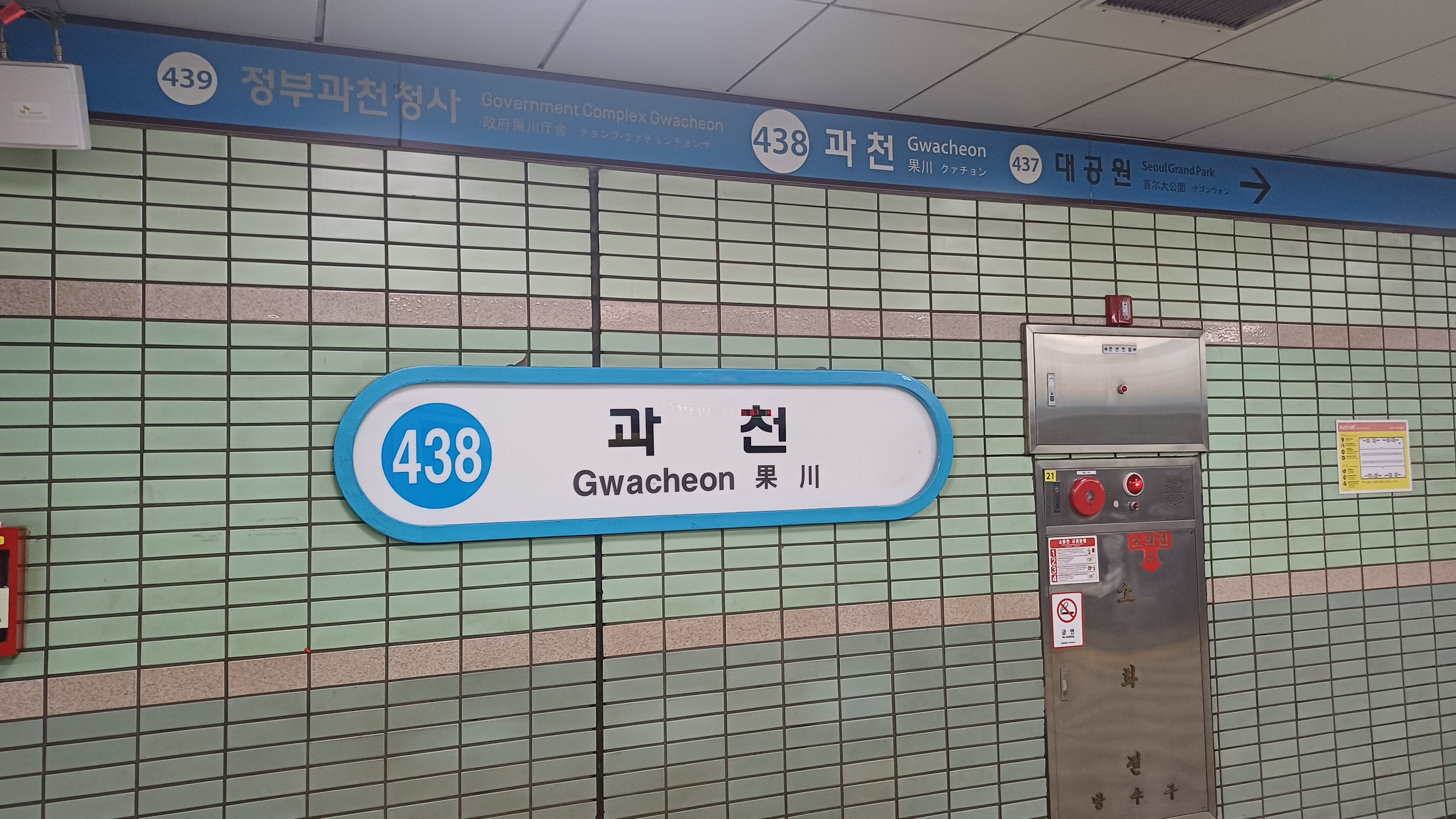

== Station layout ==
G	Street level	Exit

L1; Concourse	Lobby	Customer Service, Shops, Vending machines, ATMs

L2; Platforms	Side platform, doors open on the left
L2; Platforms	Southbound	Gwacheon Line toward Oido (Gov't Complex Gwacheon) →
L2; Platforms	Northbound	← Gwacheon Line toward Jinjeop (Seoul Grand Park)
L2; Platforms	Side platform, doors open on the left

Preceding station	Seoul Metropolitan Subway	Following station
Seoul Grand Park towards Jinjeop	Line 4	Government Complex Gwacheon towards Oido
