= Government Complex Gwacheon station =

Metro station in South Korea

Coordinates: 37.42648°N 126.98964°E

| 정부과천청사; Government Complex Gwacheon |
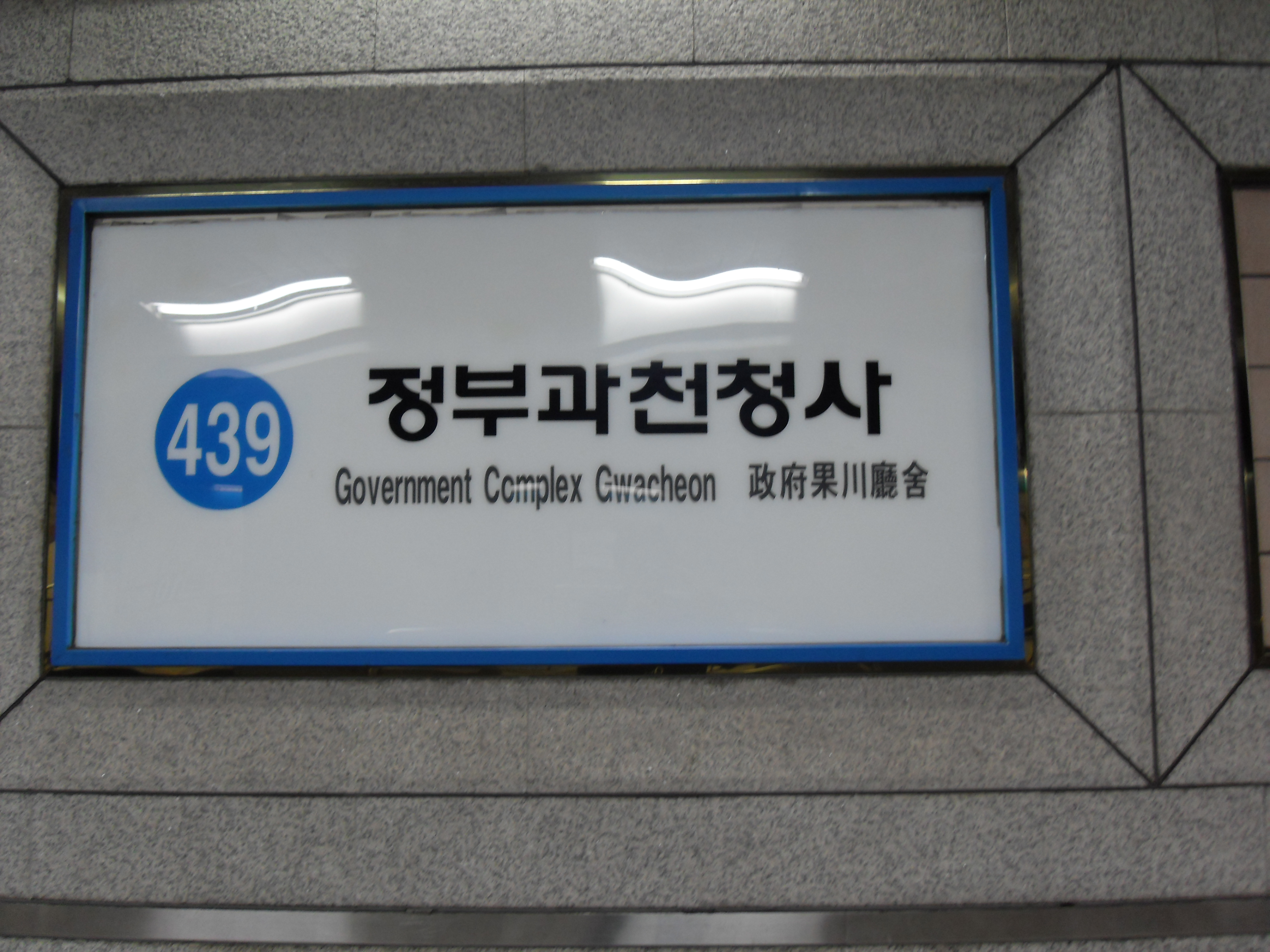

Korean name
- Hangul: 정부과천청사역
- Hanja: 政府果川廳舍驛
- Revised Romanization: Jeongbugwacheoncheongsa-yeok
- McCune–Reischauer: Chŏngbugwach'ŏnch'ŏngsa-yŏk

General information
- Location: 1 Byeoryang-dong, Gwacheon-si, Gyeonggi-do
- Operated by: Korail
- Line: Line 4
- Platforms: 2
- Tracks: 2

Construction
- Structure type: Underground

Key dates
- April 1, 1994: Line 4 opened
Location

Government Complex Gwacheon station is a station on Seoul Subway Line 4 in South Korea. It is the main station serving the city of Gwacheon.

== Station layout ==
| G | Street level | Exit |

| L1; Concourse | Lobby | Customer service, shops, vending machines, ATMs |

| L2; Platforms | Side platform, doors will open on the left |
| L2; Platforms | Southbound | Gwacheon Line toward Oido (Indeogwon) → |
| L2; Platforms | Northbound | ← Gwacheon Line toward Jinjeop (Gwacheon) |
| L2; Platforms | Side platform, doors will open on the left |

| Preceding station | Seoul Metropolitan Subway | Following station |
|---|---|---|
| Gwacheon towards Jinjeop | Line 4 | Indeogwon towards Oido |
