= Seoul Grand Park =

Park complex in Gwacheon, South Korea

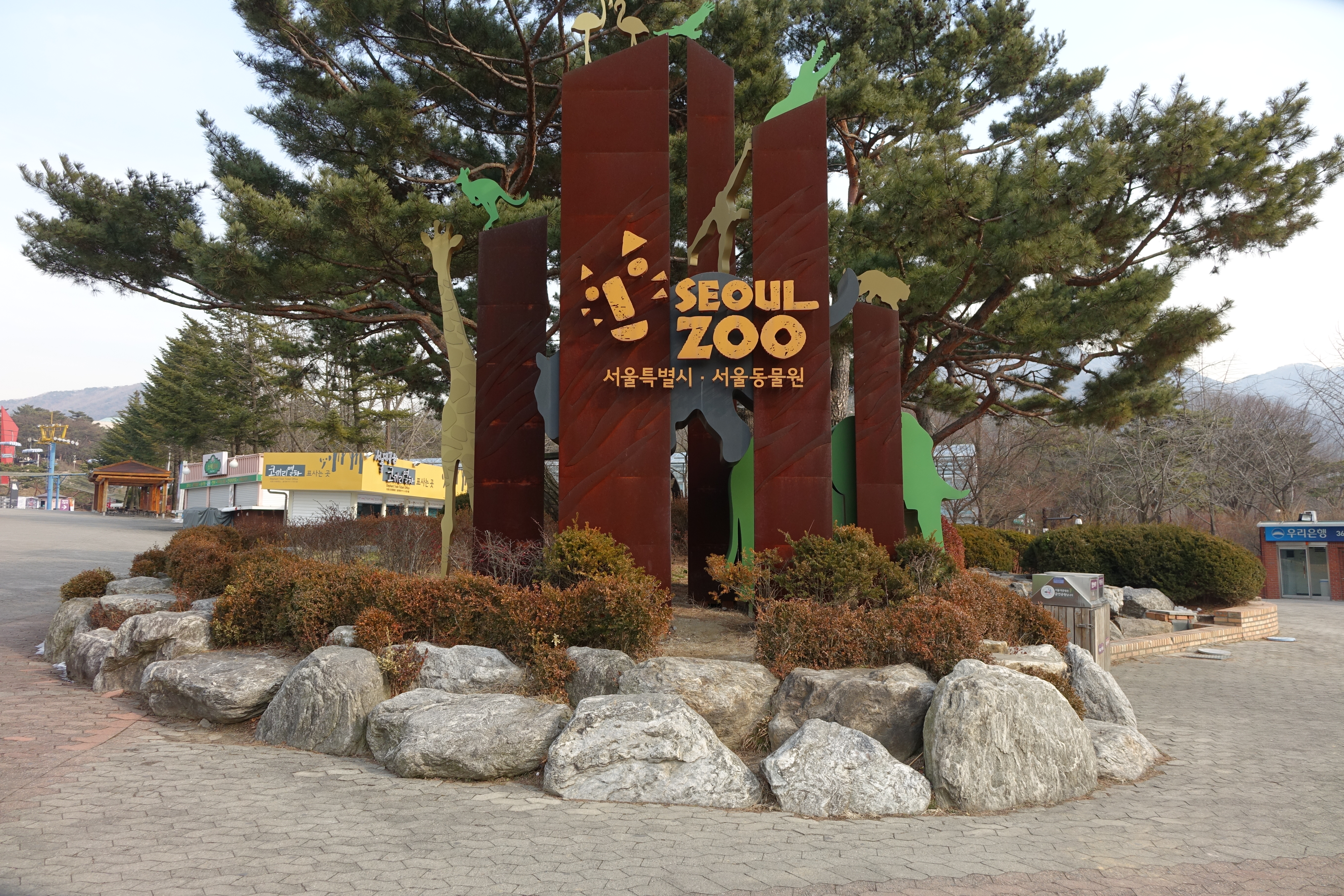
- Seoul Grand Park Zoo, 2015
- Interactive map of Seoul Grand Park
- Location: Makgye-dong, Gwacheon, South Korea
- Coordinates: 37°25′50″N 127°01′02″E
- Established: May 1st, 1984
- Website: grandpark.seoul.go.kr/main/en.do

Seoul Grand Park
- Hangul: 서울대공원
- Hanja: 서울大公園
- RR: Seoul daegongwon
- MR: Sŏul taegongwŏn

Gwacheon Seoul Grand Park
- Hangul: 과천서울대공원
- Hanja: 果川서울大公園
- RR: Gwacheon Seoul daegongwon
- MR: Kwach'ŏn Sŏul taegongwŏn

Seoul Grand Park (Korean: 서울대공원) or Gwacheon Seoul Grand Park (과천서울대공원) is a park complex located in Gwacheon, South Korea. The name "Seoul Grand Park" is usually synonymized with the term Seoul Zoo (서울동물원), which is part of Seoul Grand Park.

The origins of Seoul Zoo can be traced back to Changgyeongwon, which was founded by the Empire of Japan by dismantling and damaging Changgyeonggung Palace. The zoo remained in place even after the Liberation of Korea until it was reconstructed and reopened in 1984. In 1985, the Seoul Grand Park Botanical Garden was opened, succeeded in 1988 by Seoul Land, a theme park. In 1986, the National Museum of Modern and Contemporary Art, Korea was opened, dedicated to the preservation of Korean contemporary artworks.

The Seoul Zoo is South Korea's largest zoo.

The attractions all have separate admission fees. Line 4 of the Seoul Metropolitan Subway stops at Seoul Grand Park Station. A shuttle bus from the station visits the art museum and upper park entrance.

== Facilities ==
=== Seoul Zoological Garden ===
Seoul Zoological Garden or Seoul Grand Park Zoo or Seoul Zoo (서울동물원; 서울動物園) is the first zoo in the Korean peninsula.

The Seoul Zoo has more than 3,000 animals from 330 species. The zoo is the 10th largest in the world and a recognized member of the Species360 (formerly International Species Information System or ISIS) and the World Zoo Organization.

==== History ====
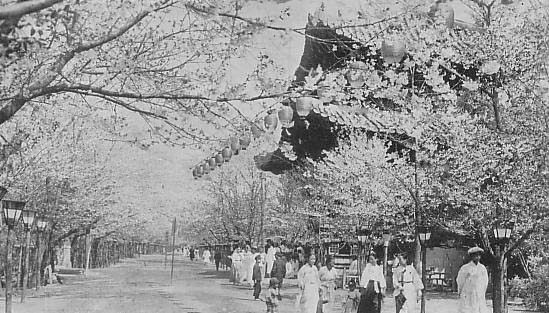
Shokei-en Park in the 1930s

The Seoul Zoo was created on November 1, 1909, by the Japanese, in the former royal palace of Changgyeonggung, which was under the changed name of Changgyeongwon (창경원; 昌慶苑) or Changgyeong Park, the "gung" standing for the Korean word 'palace', and the "won" standing for the Korean word 'park'. The zoo opened in November 1, 1909, with 361 animals from 73 species, including Siberian tigers, kangaroos, ostriches, camels, and orangutans. The Japanese also built a botanical garden, and museum on the site.

Towards the end of World War II the Japanese gave orders to kill the animals in the zoo, poisoning 150 animals. Animals that survived this had to also survive the end of the war, when all the remaining zookeepers fled the zoo.

After independence in 1945 and the turmoil and destruction of the 1950–1953 Korean War, the zoo was restocked through donations of wealthy Koreans as well as gifts from foreign zoos. The zoo was maintained by the South Korean government at Changgyeongwon.

Public opinion appealing for the relocation of Changgyeongwon and the restoration of Changgyeonggung increased. In addition, many of the Changgyeongwon facilities were in desperate need of renovation, and the aging park was struggling to accommodate visitors. Makgye-dong, Gwacheon City, was selected as the site for the new zoo, and construction began in 1979. Although some animals were relocated to the new zoo, most were independently imported. On May 1, 1984, Seoul Zoo was opened to the public.

On July 27, 1987, due to the heavy rains, a landslide occurred around 5:00 am in the area of the Carnivore Enclosure section where 21 animals of seven species were housed. Half of the tiger cage's isolation fence was destroyed. Two coyotes escaped, were captured and reaccommodated. The jaguars housed in the zoo were presumed dead, but their corpses were not found. A 10-year-old female jaguar escaped. It was confirmed that she had run away, and the search started at 12:00 on the same day, and at around 18:30 on July 28, 37 hours after the incident occurred, at 245 m (804 ft) above sea level in Mt. Cheonggyesan, it ended with being killed.

On the morning of December 6, 2010, while the Seoul Zoo moved Kkoma (꼬마; lit. 'kid') who is a male Malayan sun bear to the quarantine area and cleaned the release area, he opened the door with his front paws and escaped to Mt. Cheonggyesan. Since the Malayan sun bear is small enough to be captured, the zoo was planned to capture Kkoma alive rather than kill. The tracking continued for about 9 days, but it was difficult to directly capture Kkoma, and a trap operation was conducted to catch him by decoy rather than tracking to reduce the stress caused by excessive tracking. On December 13, 2010, Kkoma ate snacks, cup noodles, Yōkan, etc. and drank juices and a Makgeolli at the food stalls on the mountain. Then, two days later, on December 15, the 9th day of the escape, Kkoma was caught in the trap that had been set up, after that, he was shot with a tranquilizer gun to calm down and move inside the trap, and returned safely to the zoo.

On August 5, 2012, a male white rhinoceros, Kodol, escaped from the inner room and went into the zookeeper's kitchen and tool storage room, but was injured by bumping into the body in a small space. Water guns were fired to send them away, but Kodol died of heart attack.

In Pacific Land Aquarium, Jungmun Tourist Complex, Seogwipo-si city, Jeju Special Self-Governing Province, Indo-Pacific bottlenose dolphins caught in fishing nets were originally supposed to be released, but they were illegally purchased from fishermen and mobilized for dolphin shows. Meanwhile, Seoul Grand Park brought in illegally caught dolphins in 1999, 2002, and 2009 by purchasing or exchanging Geumdeung, Daepo, and Jedol (제돌) (or Jedoli (제돌이)), respectively. On March 2, 2013, after the illegal capture became known, environmental groups called for the dolphins to be released. On March 12, 2013, the city of Seoul decided to release Jedol, who was young and had just been bred, after hearing the opinions of experts. The decision to confiscate the dolphins was made through the criminal trial against Pacific Land Aquarium, and this judgment was upheld in the first and second trials and confirmed by the Supreme Court on March 28, 2013. On April 8, four dolphins were confiscated: Chunsam, D-38, Taesan, and Boksun. On May 11, Jedol was moved to Jeju Island. Afterwards, they received wild adaptation training at the fish farm in Seongsan Port. On the afternoon of July 18, Jedol was released. Taesan and Boksun were moved to Jeju Island on May 14, 2015, and released into nature on July 6 of the same year. Goodbye, Thank You for the Fish (잘있어, 생선은 고마웠어; Jarisseo, saengseoneun gomawosseo) which is a non-fiction about the process of releasing Indo-Pacific bottlenose dolphins including Jedol into the wild, was published on May 15, 2017.

On November 24, 2013, an accident occurred in which a zookeeper was bitten and killed by Rostov, a Siberian tiger.

On August 19, 2018, the dismembered cadaver of a murder victim was found in a hiking trail of the Mt. Cheonggyesan near the parking lot of the Seoul Grand Park.

From 2021 to 2022, all the animals at the outdoor range of the South American Pavilion were euthanised due to bovine tuberculosis. This was covered up, to prevent excessive fear.

=== Seoul Land ===
Seoul Land is an amusement park in the Seoul Grand park complex. It opened in 1987, just before the 1988 Summer Olympics. It has about 40 rides and has approximately 3–3.5 million visitors per year.

=== National Museum of Modern and Contemporary Art ===
The National Museum of Modern and Contemporary Art is a museum in the Seoul Grand park complex. It was initially established in Gyeongbokgung on October 20, 1969, but was moved to Deoksugung in 1973. The Gwacheon venue opened in 1986.

== Exhibits ==
=== Seoul Zoo ===
Seoul Zoo actively participates in conservation efforts around the world, and has its own conservation lab, the Conservation Education Center (종보전교육관), which researches endangered Korean native animals, including long-tailed gorals and Seoul frogs.

==== Flamingo Pavilion ====
The Flamingo Pavilion is the first exhibit visible by visitors, after entering through the main gate. It hosts four species of flamingoes, including American flamingos and a few greater flamingos, lesser flamingos and Chilean flamingos.

==== 1st Africa Pavilion ====
The 1st Africa Pavilion is dedicated to the many herbivores of Africa. It is formed of a giant enclosure in the center with several smaller enclosures surrounding it, with an indoor exhibit detailing the zoo's history. The giraffe enclosure in the center and the other great herbivores of Africa are positioned to imitate the wide savannas of Africa. Animals that call this area home includes hybrid giraffes, plains zebras, ostriches, gemsboks, with fennec foxes and black-tailed prairie dogs in the outer rim.

The Africa Pavilion also formerly housed greater kudus, dama gazelles, springboks and even waterbucks. Among them, the only specimen of Waterbuck in South Korea died of old age on October 3, 2019, at the age of 18.

==== 2nd Africa Pavilion ====
The 2nd Africa Pavilion hosts many rare African animals. It consists of a large pool, divided into sections, with other exhibits stretching away from it, accompanied with an indoor exhibit. This sector hosts hippopotamuses, Barbary sheep, Dall sheep, and meerkats. It is also home to pygmy hippopotamuses, which are highly endangered in the wild, and scimitar oryxes.

The zoo formerly hosted two pygmy hippos, a male and a female. When the female died, the old, blind male, named Ha-mong (하몽) was left alone. With efforts from Korean citizens, Seoul Zoo and Colchester Zoo in the United Kingdom agreed on a deal to transfer Colchester's female pygmy hippo, named Julie, to Seoul. Julie entered Korea in October 2015. She is now renamed Na-mong (나몽). Ha-mong died in 2020.

==== 3rd Africa Pavilion ====
African predators are the theme of the 3rd Africa Pavilion. It has an African plain motif and the habitats are littered with rocks and tall grass to best imitate the natural habitats of African mammals, with observatories dotted around. Animals on display include lions, cheetahs, spotted hyenas, sable antelopes, and common elands.

The zoo currently hosts 7 lions, with 6 lions—3 males, Reo, Sol, Fado, and 3 females, Titi, Jespa, and Jane, forming a pride. One female, Cheongja, lives separately from the other lions.

Meanwhile, in the past, there were many more diverse herbivores here, such as bonteboks, Grevy's zebra, roan antelopes, and blue wildebeests, but they have decreased due to death, and a male sable antelope is isolated in the radiation area where the bontebok and the grevy's zebra's last specimen in Korea used to live.

==== Ape Pavilion ====
The Ape Pavilion is dedicated to the many species of primates. It hosts many primates, including a western lowland gorilla, chimpanzees, orangutans, olive baboons, hamadryas baboons, mandrills, De Brazza's monkeys, and grivets. In April 2011, the Ape Pavilion's chimpanzee enclosure unveiled a tall climbing tower, about 24 meters tall, designed to stimulate and enrich the climing nature and behavior of chimpanzees, in part with the zoo's behavior enrichment program.

The Ape Pavilion underwent renovations in October 2023, and reopened in December 2023.

==== Large Herbivores Pavilion ====
The Large Herbivores Pavilion is home to some the most impressive animals in the zoo. Animals on display include Ankole-Watusi cattle, African buffaloes, water buffaloes, Southern white rhinoceroses, American bison, and Asian elephants.

The zoo's three Asian elephants, all of them female, have a long history with the zoo. Kima, 33 years old as of 2025, is the matriarch of the Seoul elephant herd and largest among the zoo's four elephants. Kima was one of the first elephants at the zoo when it opened at its current location in 1984. Sugela, 21 years old as of 2025, arrived from Sri Lanka as a donation from then-President Mahinda Rajapaksa, who had liaisons with Korean humanitarian aid, in 2010, alongside a male named Gajava. Sugela gave birth to a baby elephant, named Hee-mang (희망, "hope" in Korean) in 2016, who is 9 as of 2025. Gajava died from heat stroke in 2018.

Prior to the current herd, other elephant inhabitants have gained fame. Giant (1952~2009) was 3 years old when he was imported to Changgyeongwon from Thailand through the efforts of the late CEO Lee Byung-chul, founder of Samsung. Even after moving into Gwacheon, Giant was popular with the public and lived a long life. Giant died in 2009 at the age of 57. At the time of his death, he was the oldest captive animal in Korea. Sakura (1965~2024), the oldest elephant in Korea, was formerly exhibited in a private zoo in Japan, when she was only seven months old. When the zoo closed in 2003, she was brought to Seoul Zoo, but her long time in solidarity made it hard for her to integrate. Not until 2018 was Sakura able to fully stand as a member of the Seoul elephant herd. Sakura died on February 13, 2024, replacing Giant as the oldest elephant in South Korea. Kanto (c. 1983~2018), a male elephant, entered Seoul Zoo in 1985, when he was approximately 2 years old. Kanto died of a foot abscess in 2018.

Seoul Zoo also formerly hosted African bush elephants. The last of them, Rika, fell in love with Sakura, an Asian elephant. When Rika died on March 13th, 2008, Sakura became heartbroken and remained secluded from the rest of the elephant herd, rejecting the woos of Giant.

==== Australia Pavilion ====
The Australian Pavilion is positioned in the south of the zoo, south-west of the Large Animal Pavilion. Animals in this exhibit include red kangaroos, eastern gray kangaroos, wallaroos, emus, and southern cassowaries.

== Cultural reference ==
- Dooly the Little Dinosaur (1987) - Season 1 Episode 2 "Grand Park Disturbance" (대공원 소동; original airdate: October 7, 1987)

== Gallery ==
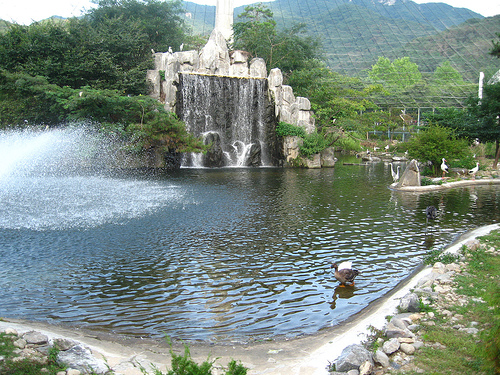
Bird Island

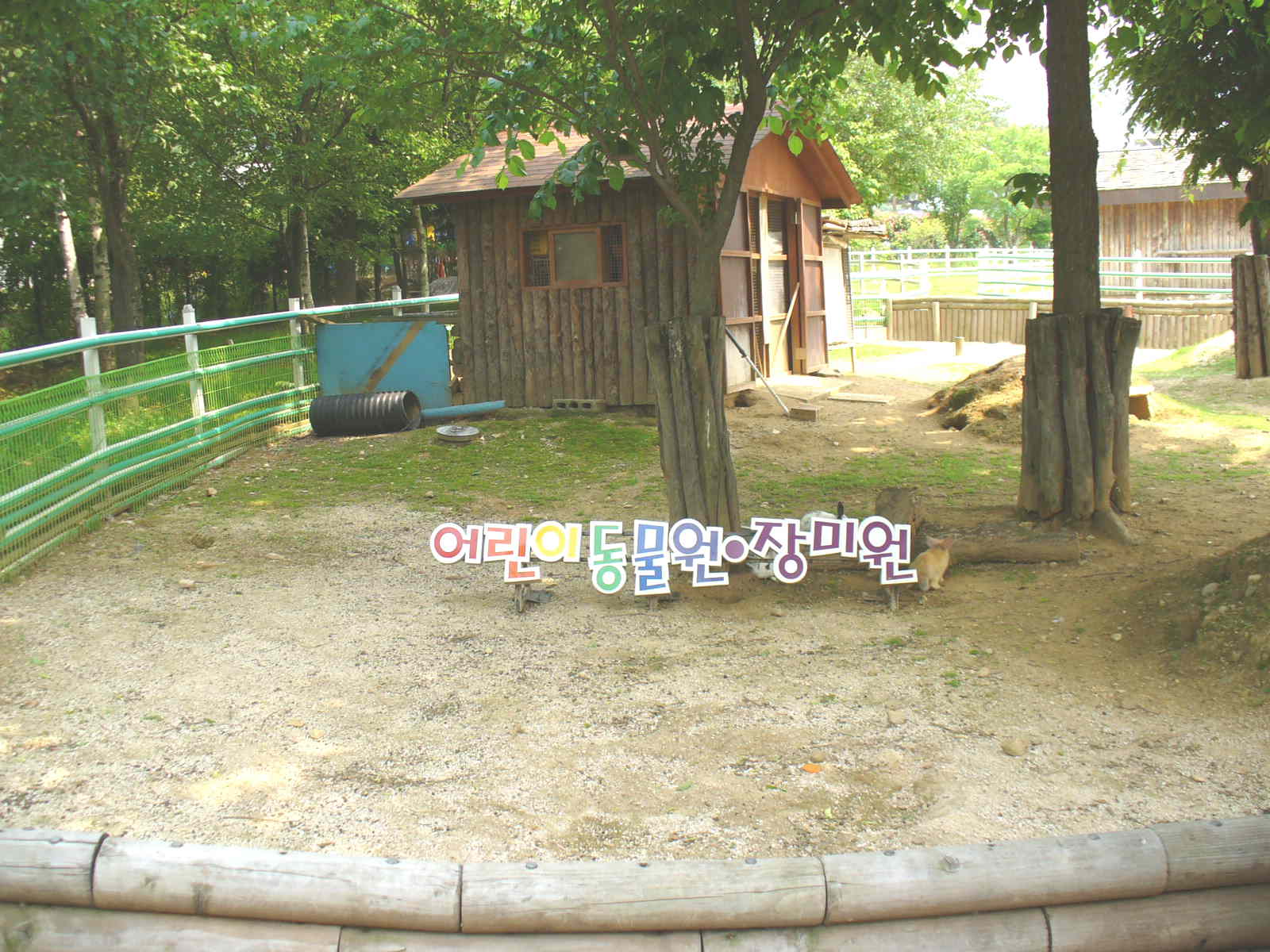
The Entrance to the Children's Zoo

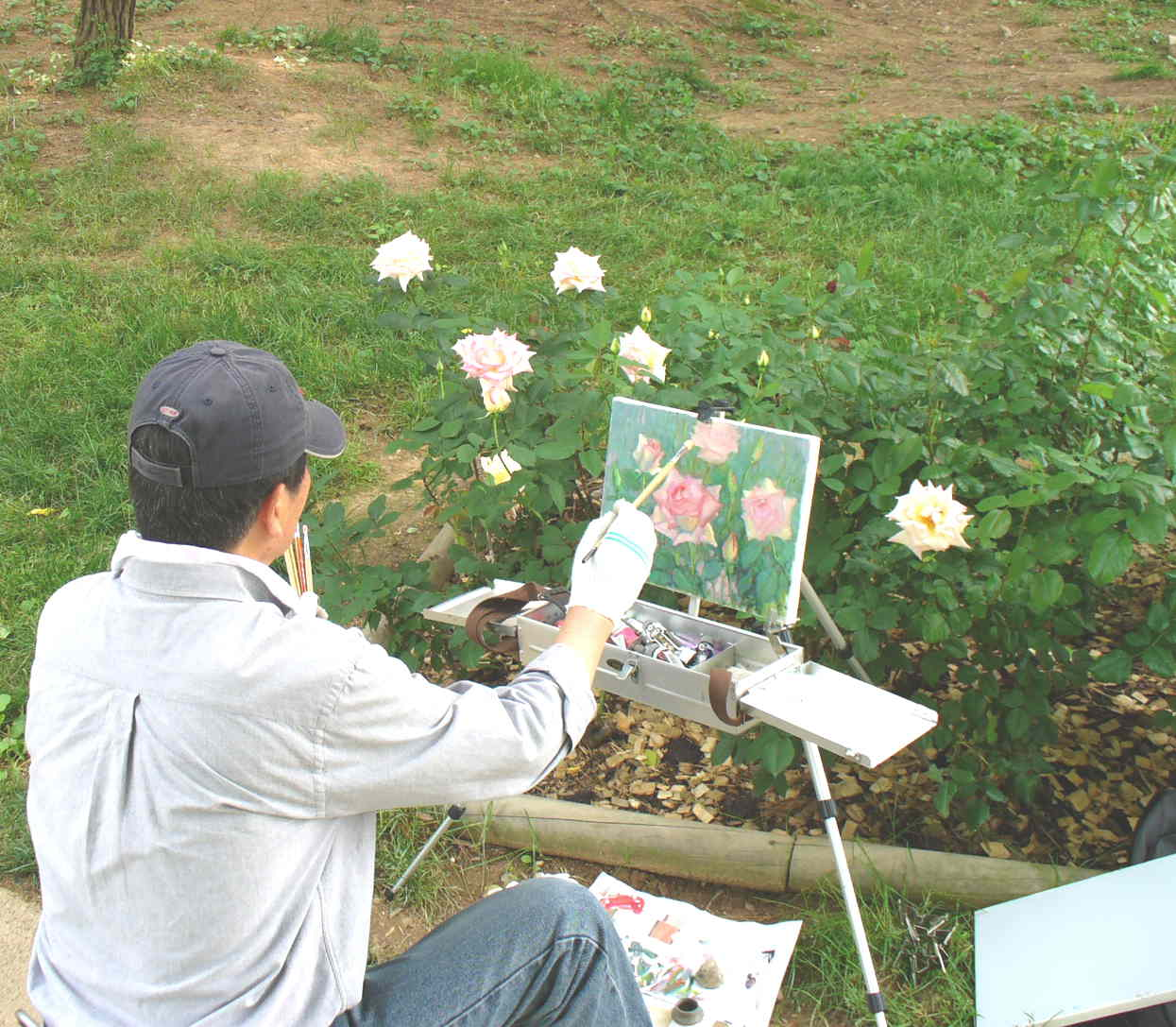
A common scene at the Rose Garden, when the roses are in bloom

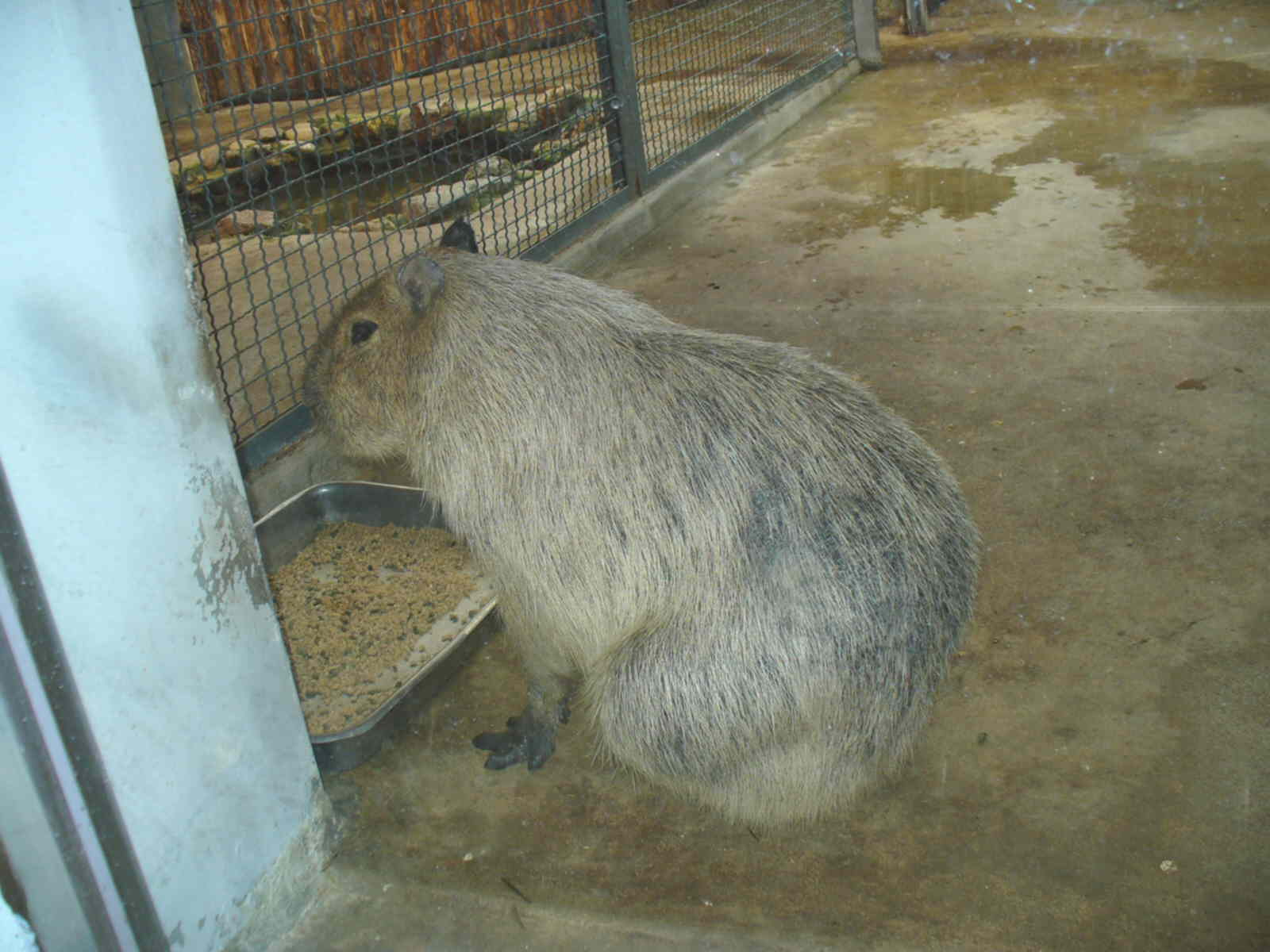
There are no longer any capybaras in Seoul Grand Park.

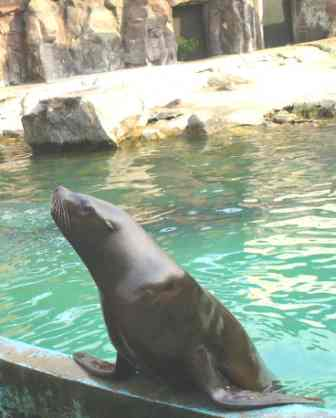
A sea lion at the zoo at Seoul Grand Park

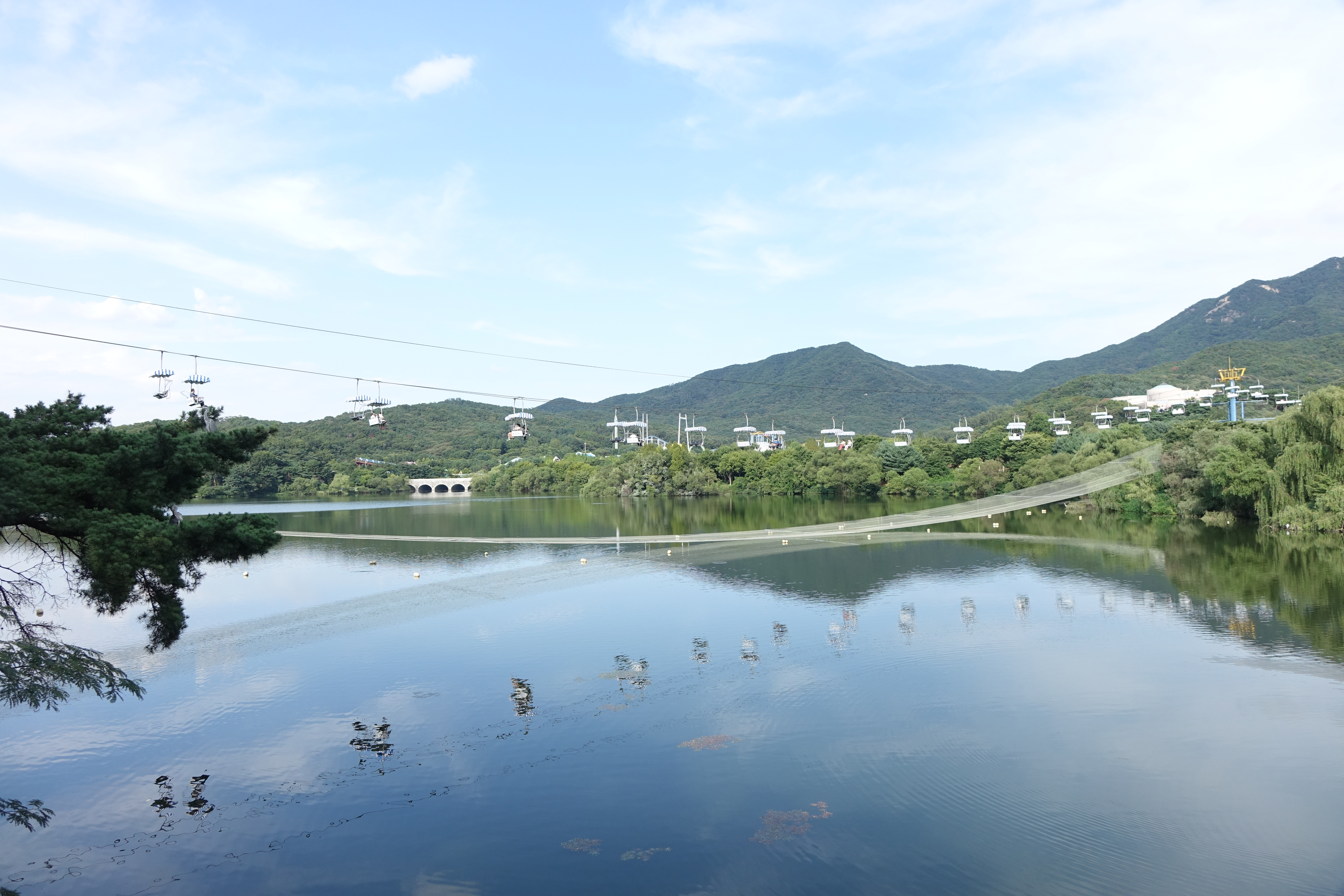
Lake of Seoul Grand Park

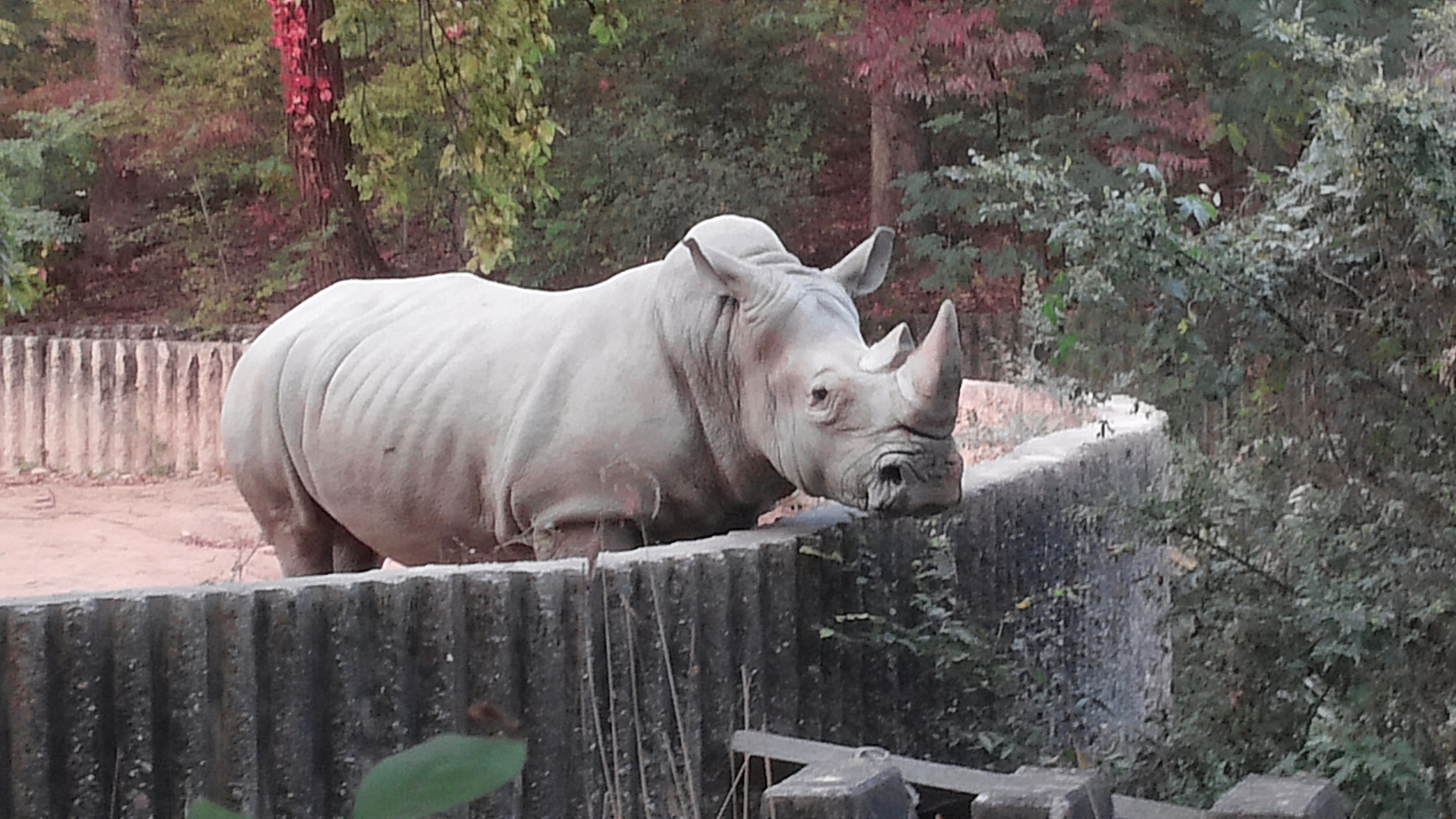
Southern white rhinoceros in Seoul Grand Park

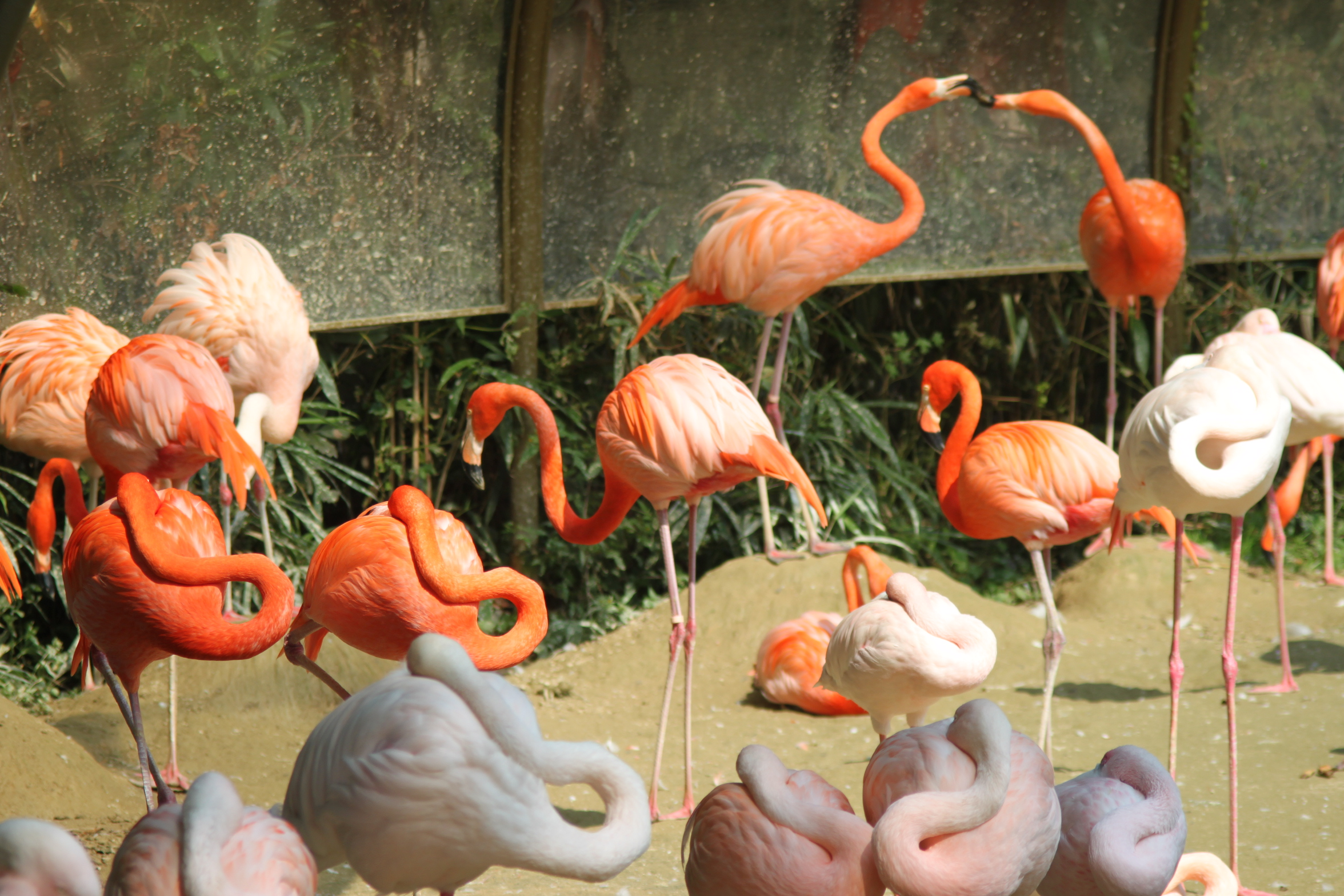
Flock of flamingos in Seoul Grand Park

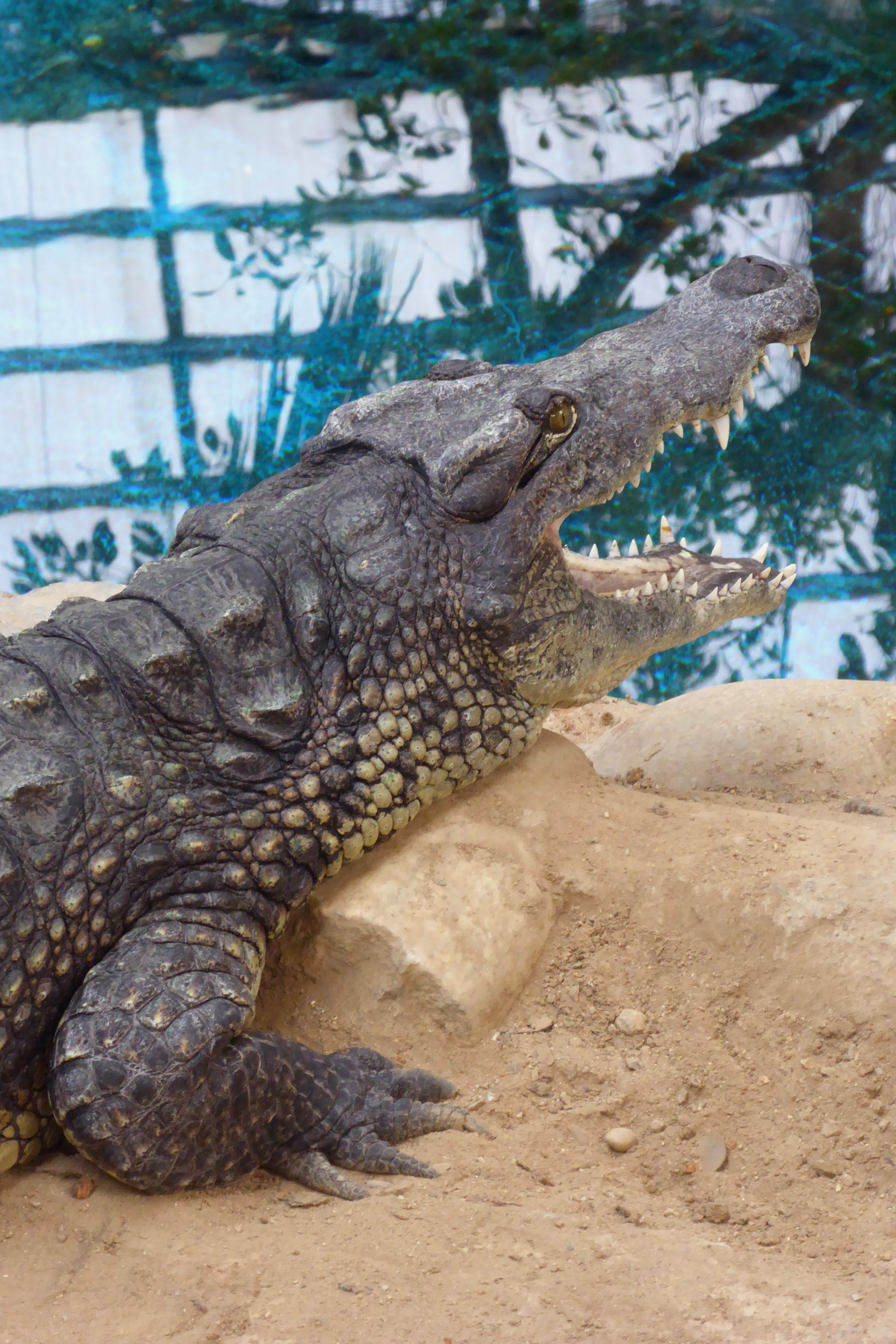
There are no longer any Nile crocodiles in Seoul Grand Park.

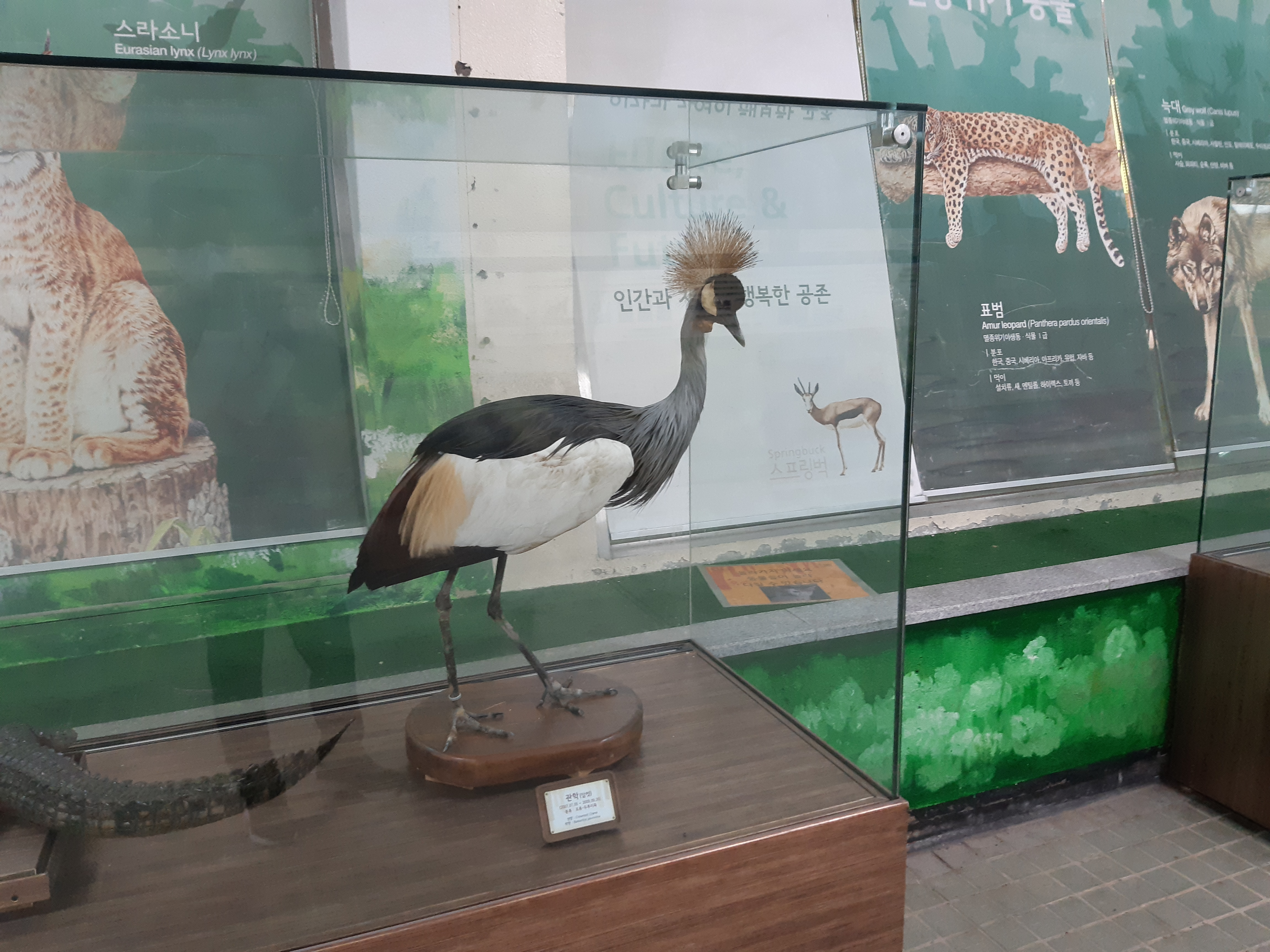
Taxidermied grey-crowned crane in Seoul Grand Park
