= Gwacheon =

City in Gyeonggi Province, South Korea

- Municipal City
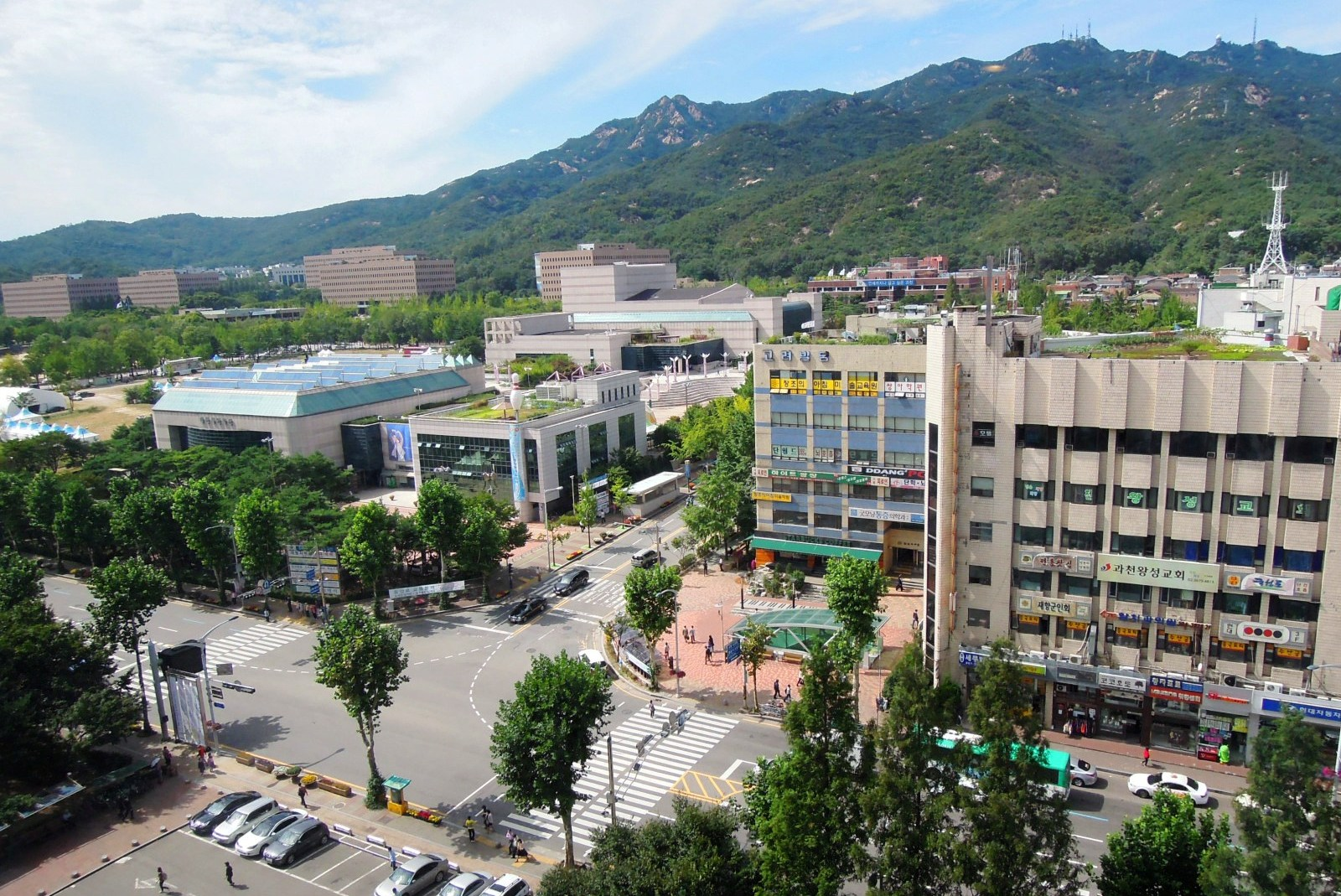

- Flag Emblem

- Location within South Korea
- Coordinates: 37°26′N 127°0′E
- Country: South Korea
- Region: Gyeonggi (Seoul Metropolitan Area)
- Administrative divisions: 6 dong

Government
  - Mayor: Yeo In-kook

Area
  - Total: 35.86 km^{2} (13.85 sq mi)

Population (September 2025)
  - Total: 81,239
  - Density: 2,010.3/km^{2} (5,207/sq mi)
  - Dialect: Seoul
- Website: Gwacheon City (in English)

Korean name
- Hangul: 과천시
- Hanja: 果川市
- RR: Gwacheon-si
- MR: Kwach'ŏn-si

Gwacheon (Korean: 과천; Korean pronunciation: [kwa.tɕʰʌn]) is a city in Gyeonggi Province, South Korea. It lies in the heart of the Seoul Metropolitan Area, just south of Seoul and east of Anyang. Seoul Subway Line 4 passes through the city.

Various attractions usually associated with Seoul, including Seoul Grand Park, National Museum of Contemporary Art, Seoul Land, Gwacheon National Science Museum, and Seoul Race Park are actually located in Gwacheon or its immediate jurisdiction. It is also home to a major administrative center of the Korean government.

== History ==
=== Early history ===
In 475 CE, the land that would one day become Gwacheon was a part of Yulmok-gun, a county of the Korean Peninsula's Goguryeo dynasty. Later, in 757, Unified Silla dubbed the area Yuljin-gun, a county of Hansan-ju, and the Goryeo dynasty renamed it Gwaju in 940. From 990 to 994, Gwaju was also known as "Bulim" and "Buan". The year 1018 saw Goryeo christen the area Gwaju-hyeon, but the Joseon dynasty changed its name to Gwacheon-hyeon in 1413. Gwacheon-hyeon was a part of Gwangju-mok, Gyeonggi Province. Much larger than today's Gwacheon-si, Gwacheon-hyeon included such territory as modern-day Gunpo.

May 26, 1895 saw Gwacheon-hyeon become Gwacheon-gun, and on March 1, 1914, Gwacheon- and Ansan-gun were annexed to nearby Siheung-gun. The area containing present-day Gwacheon was deemed Gwacheon-myeon, a division of Siheung-gun. Gwacheon-myeon was a large farming village just south of Seoul, as it had been for centuries, and its population had topped 6,000 by 1960.

In the 1970s, the South Korean government was considering moving its capital south, to a location farther from the border with North Korea as Seoul lies within the artillery range from any North Korean attacks. A complete relocation of the capital proved financially impossible, but a compromise was reached in 1975: move key government agencies several kilometers south of Seoul's downtown, beyond the range of nearly all of North Korea's artillery capability. Gwacheon-myeon, south of both Seoul and the protective Gwanaksan mountain range, was chosen as the site of this new administrative city in 1978, and a groundbreaking ceremony in Gwacheon was held in 1979.

=== Administrative city ===
Several government ministries were moved from Seoul to Gwacheon throughout the 1980s and 1990s, and residential districts were constructed to house the employees and their families. The nine million square meter Seoul Grand Park was opened in Gwacheon in 1984 as the new location of Seoul Zoo. Over the next four years, two amusement parks, a botanical garden, and the National Museum of Contemporary Art were also built on the property. On January 1, 1986, Gwacheon was officially elevated to Gwacheon-si (city), and three years later, Siheung-gun was completely disbanded when five other cities in the Seoul National Capital Area were created by the national government.

When Seoul won the right to host the 1988 Summer Olympics, it placed the Korean Racing Association in charge of constructing an Olympic Equestrian Park. 280 acres of land in Gwacheon were thus secured by the KRA, and construction began in 1984. Seoul Equestrian Park hosted several Olympic events in 1988, and after the conclusion of the games, the park was renamed Seoul Racecourse Park and converted into a horse racing facility. Gwacheon accordingly replaced Seoul's Ttukseom area as the city's horse racing hub, and the first race at the new location occurred on September 1, 1989.

Five stations on Seoul Metropolitan Subway's Line 4 opened in Gwacheon on April 1, 1994. The line runs southwest through the city from Seoul into Anyang and includes Seonbawi Station, Seoul Racecourse Park Station, Seoul Grand Park Station, Gwacheon Station, and Government Complex Gwacheon Station.

In 2012, government offices in Gwacheon began relocating to Sejong City, a new administrative capital created by the Korean government in the middle of the country, around 150 kilometers south of Seoul. The move had adverse effects on Gwacheon's local economy, with business such as restaurants and cafes losing considerable portions of their customer base. Fifty-four shops shut down at the end of 2012 and beginning of 2013, while others could no longer turn a profit and were forced to lay off employees. The national government hoped to counter the city's economic crisis by moving fourteen new government agencies to Gwacheon.

== Characteristics ==
Gwacheon intended to have a large importance on governmental construction. There is No.2 government building. So it keeps the position of planned city concerning politics in South Korea. It has been serving as a second center of governmental complex which consists of city hall, welfare management offices, health care department, and many other sub departments of politics.

Seoul Grand Park and Gwanaksan (ko:관악산) occupy a large portion of the city. The presence of mountains and forests accentuates the status of Gwacheon as a destination for Korean nature lovers. In addition, the Seoul Race Park is also located in the city. Gwacheon has few historically preserved sites as well. Gwacheon Hyanggyo (Korean Confucianism institution built in 1389), YeonJudae (ko:연주대) (YeonJu Temple which is located at the end of cliff), three stepped pagoda of YeonJu Temple, and Portrait of HyoRyung Janggun (general HyoRyung) are listed as treasure of Gyeonggi-do (Gyeonggi Province) and map of Joseon (Old Korean Kingdom) located in History Ministry inside the governmental complex is listed as one of Korean national treasure. In history of Korea, Gwacheon has not only been known for its landscape but also as important center of education and religious practices by Kings.

The first foreign-language high school established in Gyeonggi-do, Gwacheon Foreign Language High School is located in Jongang-dong. Gwacheon has the Science and Technology Center and one of the biggest public libraries of Gyeonggi-do.

== Climate ==
Gwacheon has a humid continental climate (Köppen: Dwa), but can be considered a borderline humid subtropical climate (Köppen: Cwa) using the −3 °C (27 °F) isotherm.

Climate data for Gwacheon (1996–2020 normals)
Month	Jan	Feb	Mar	Apr	May	Jun	Jul	Aug	Sep	Oct	Nov	Dec	Year
Mean daily maximum °C (°F)	2.7 (36.9)	5.7 (42.3)	11.7 (53.1)	18.5 (65.3)	24.2 (75.6)	28.1 (82.6)	29.6 (85.3)	30.7 (87.3)	26.6 (79.9)	20.5 (68.9)	12.4 (54.3)	4.6 (40.3)	17.9 (64.2)
Daily mean °C (°F)	−2.3 (27.9)	0.3 (32.5)	5.9 (42.6)	12.0 (53.6)	17.9 (64.2)	22.4 (72.3)	25.2 (77.4)	25.9 (78.6)	21.0 (69.8)	14.2 (57.6)	7.0 (44.6)	−0.2 (31.6)	12.4 (54.3)
Mean daily minimum °C (°F)	−7.1 (19.2)	−4.5 (23.9)	0.6 (33.1)	6.5 (43.7)	12.1 (53.8)	17.5 (63.5)	21.7 (71.1)	22.2 (72.0)	16.5 (61.7)	8.9 (48.0)	2.2 (36.0)	−4.9 (23.2)	7.6 (45.7)
Average precipitation mm (inches)	13.4 (0.53)	24.1 (0.95)	32.7 (1.29)	67.4 (2.65)	90.2 (3.55)	123.8 (4.87)	392.8 (15.46)	313.6 (12.35)	137.9 (5.43)	45.3 (1.78)	52.1 (2.05)	19.8 (0.78)	1,313.1 (51.70)
Average precipitation days (≥ 0.1 mm)	3.7	3.9	5.4	7.0	7.3	8.2	13.7	13.3	7.6	5.2	7.0	5.0	87.3
Source: Korea Meteorological Administration

== Notable people ==
Gwacheon's notable former residents include:

- Jin, a singer and member of K-pop group BTS
- Dennis Hwang, a graphic artist who spent much of his childhood in Gwacheon
- Lee Hoe-taek (Hui), a singer and member of K-pop group Pentagon born in Gwacheon
- Lee Soo-hyuk, a model and actor born in Gwacheon.
- Anton Hur, a writer and translator whose hometown is Gwacheon.

== Home stay ==
Gwacheon operates a home stay program for foreigners. The city sponsors this program and residents of the city host foreigners living in Korea who want to spend a night in a traditional Korean home. The program helps foreigners understand Korean culture and lifestyle.

== Government ==
The headquarters of the Ministry of Justice is in Building #1 of the Gwacheon Government Complex in Gwacheon. The Korea Correctional Service, an agency of the MOJ, is in this building.

The headquarters of the Ministry of Science, ICT and Future Planning was previously headquartered in Building #4 of the Gwacheon Government Complex.

Several government ministries and agencies formerly residing in Gwacheon are now located in Sejong City. The Ministry of Land, Transport and Maritime Affairs (MLTM, now the Ministry of Land, Infrastructure and Transport or MOLIT) was previously headquartered in the fourth building of the Gwacheon Government Complex, in Gwacheon. Ministry for Food, Agriculture, Forestry and Fisheries (now succeeded by the Ministry of Agriculture, Food and Rural Affairs) also formerly had its headquarters in the Gwacheon Government Complex. Previously the Ministry of Environment had its headquarters in Gwacheon. The Ministry of Strategy and Finance previously had its headquarters in Government Complex II. The Ministry of Trade, Industry and Energy (MOTIE), previously known as the Ministry of Knowledge Economy (MKE) and the Ministry of Commerce, Industry and Energy (MOCIE), was previously located in the government complex in Gwacheon. The Ministry of Employment and Labor (MOEL), previously the Ministry of Labor, was located in Buildings 1 and 3 of the Government Complex II.

== Utility facilities ==
- Gwacheon City Facilities Management Corporation
- Gwacheon Public Library of Information & Science
- The Gyeonggi Gwacheon Library of Education
- Munwon Library
- Gwacheon City Youth Center
- Gwanmun Sports Park
- Munwon Sports Park

== Symbol ==
- Tree: chestnut
- Flower: royal azalea
- Bird: dove
- Animal: horse

== Transportation ==
=== Railroad ===
- Korail

- Seoul Subway Line 4

(Seocho-gu, Seoul) ← Seonbawi — Racecourse Park — Seoul Grand Park — Gwacheon — Government Complex Gwacheon → (Anyang)

== Twin towns – sister cities ==
Gwacheon is twinned with:

- Burlington, United States
- Nanning, China
- Shirahama, Japan
- Airdrie, Alberta, Canada

== See also ==
- Gwacheon Police Station
- Geography of South Korea
