= NU'EST discography =

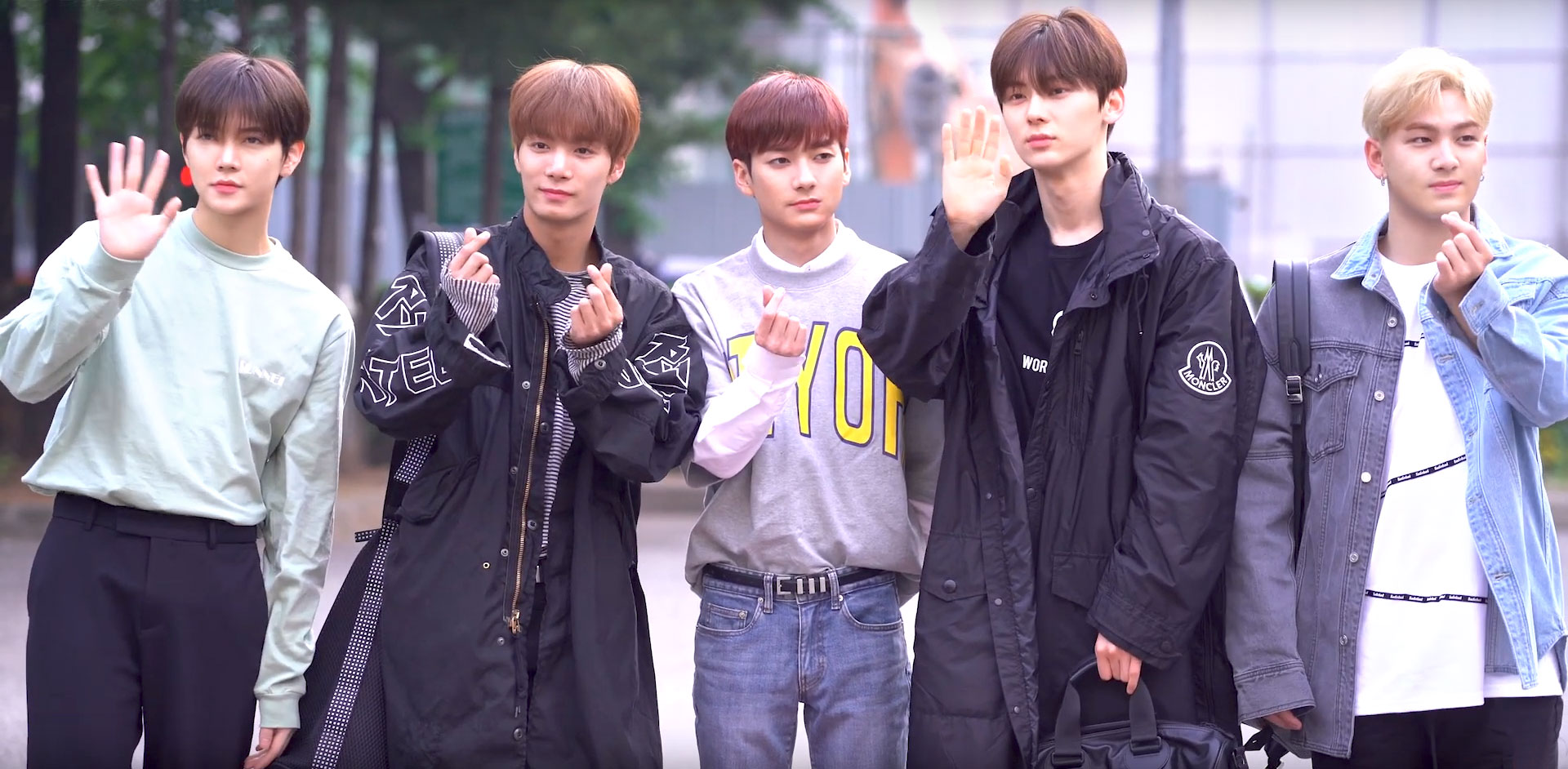
- NU'EST in May 2019
- Studio albums: 4
- Extended plays: 8
- Compilation albums: 2
- Singles: 17
- Music videos: 27

South Korean boy band NU'EST has released four studio albums, eight EPs, two compilation albums, and sixteen singles.

== Albums ==
=== Studio albums ===
List of studio albums, with selected details, chart positions, and sales
Title	Details	Peak chart positions			Sales
Title	Details	KOR	JPN	US World	Sales
Re:Birth	Released: July 9, 2014 (KOR); Label: Pledis Entertainment; Formats: CD, digital download	4	—	—	KOR: 32,988; US: 1,000
Bridge the World	Released: November 18, 2015 (JPN); Label: Ariola Japan; Formats: CD, digital download	37 (Note: Bridge the World peaked at number 4 on the Gaon International Digital Chart.)	7	—	JPN: 22,754; KOR: 1,655
Drive	Released: October 7, 2020 (JPN); Label: Pledis Japan; Formats: CD, digital download	—	8	—	JPN: 10,495
Romanticize	Released: April 19, 2021 (KOR); Label: Pledis Entertainment; Formats: CD, digital download	2	7	—	KOR: 205,972
"—" denotes releases that did not chart or were not released in that region.

=== Compilation albums ===
List of compilation albums, with selected details and chart positions
Title	Details	Peak chart positions		Sales
Title	Details	KOR	JPN	Sales
NU'EST Best in Korea	Released: July 30, 2014 (JPN); Label: Ariola Japan; Formats: CD, digital download	—	13	—N/a
Needle & Bubble	Released: March 15, 2022 (KOR); Label: Pledis Entertainment; Formats: CD, digital download	6	48	KOR: 80,592; JPN: 1,453

== Extended plays ==
List of extended plays, with selected details, chart positions, sales, and certifications
Title	Details	Peak chart positions			Sales	Certifications
Title	Details	KOR	JPN	US World	Sales	Certifications
Action	Released: July 11, 2012; Label: Pledis Entertainment; Formats: CD, digital download	4	153	—	KOR: 35,716	
Hello	Released: February 13, 2013; Label: Pledis Entertainment; Formats: CD, digital download	3	141	—	KOR: 25,403	
Sleep Talking	Released: August 22, 2013; Label: Pledis Entertainment; Formats: CD, digital download	8	137	—	KOR: 24,258	
Q is	Released: February 17, 2016; Label: Pledis Entertainment; Formats: CD, digital download	5	—	11	KOR: 30,419	
Canvas	Released: August 29, 2016; Label: Pledis Entertainment; Formats: CD, digital download	3	—	13	KOR: 30,599	
Happily Ever After	Released: April 29, 2019; Label: Pledis Entertainment; Formats: CD, digital download	1	—	8	KOR: 270,206	KMCA: Platinum
The Table	Released: October 21, 2019; Label: Pledis Entertainment; Formats: CD, digital download	2	—	—	KOR: 219,477	
The Nocturne	Released: May 11, 2020; Label: Pledis Entertainment; Formats: CD, digital download	1	5	—	KOR: 196,613; JPN: 7,798 (Phy.)	
"—" denotes releases that did not chart or were not released in that region.

== Singles ==
=== As lead artist ===
List of singles, with selected chart positions, showing year released and album name
Title	Year	Peak chart positions					Sales (Note: Sales figures for tracks are based on downloads, except noted.)	Album
Title	Year	KOR	KOR Hot (Note: The Kpop Hot 100 was discontinued beginning with the July 16, 2014 issue date. On the issue dated May 29 – June 4, 2017, the chart was re-established.)	JPN	JPN Hot	US World	Sales	Album
"Face"	2012	62	50	—	—	—	KOR: 37,898 (Phy.); KOR: 196,908	Non-album single
"Action"	2012	77	99	—	—	—	KOR: 48,954	Action
"Hello" (여보세요)	2013	20	26	—	—	—	KOR: 479,194	Hello
"Sleep Talking" (잠꼬대)	2013	92	—	—	—	—	KOR: 35,127	Sleep Talking
"Good Bye Bye"	2014	161	—	—	—	19	—N/a	Re:Birth
"Shalala Ring"	2014	—	—N/a	16	44	—	JPN: 8,282 (Phy.)	Bridge the World
"I'm Bad"	2015	220	—N/a	—	—	—	KOR: 5,000 (Phy.)	Non-album single
"Nanananamida"	2015	—	—N/a	7	15	—	JPN: 23,192 (Phy.)	Bridge the World
"Bridge the World"	2015	—	—N/a	—	—	—	—N/a	Bridge the World
"Overcome" (여왕의 기사)	2016	— (Note: "Overcome" peaked at number 375 on the Gaon Domestic Digital Chart.)	—N/a	—	—	5	—N/a	Q Is
"Love Paint (Every Afternoon)"	2016	71	—N/a	—	—	22	KOR: 30,799	Canvas
"Daybreak" (Sung by Minhyun and JR)	2016	91	—N/a	—	—	—	KOR: 25,874	Canvas
"A Song for You" (노래 제목)	2019	48	—	—	—	—	—N/a	Non-album single
"Bet Bet"	2019	14	2	—	—	—	—N/a	Happily Ever After
"Love Me"	2019	27	42	—	—	—	—N/a	The Table
"I'm in Trouble"	2020	6	43	—	—	—	—N/a	The Nocturne
"Inside Out"	2021	8	44	—	—	—	—N/a	Romanticize
"Again" (다시, 봄)	2022	180	—	—	—	—	—N/a	Needle & Bubble
"—" denotes releases that did not chart or were not released in that region.

=== As collaborating artist ===
Title	Year	Peak chart positions	Album
Title	Year	KOR	Album
"Dashing Through the Snow in High Heels" (Orange Caramel and NU'EST)	2012	25	Non-album singles
"I Don't Care" (Spoonz and NU'EST W)	2018	—	Non-album singles
"Let's Love" (Spoonz and NU'EST)	2020	—	Non-album singles
"Best Summer" (Spoonz and NU'EST)	2020	—	Non-album singles
"—" denotes releases that did not chart or were not released in that region.

== Soundtrack appearances ==
Title	Year	Peak chart positions	Album
Title	Year	KOR	Album
"Let Me Out"	2017	95	A Korean Odyssey OST Part.1
"And I"	2018	64	Mr. Sunshine OST Part.10

== Other charting songs ==
Title	Year	Peak chart positions		Album
Title	Year	KOR	KOR Hot	Album
"Segno"	2019	134	—	Happily Ever After
"Bass"	2019	158	—	Happily Ever After
"Talk About Love"	2019	167	—	Happily Ever After
"Different"	2019	172	—	Happily Ever After
"Fine"	2019	175	—	Happily Ever After
"Call Me Back"	2019	159	95	The Table
"One Two Three"	2019	—	96	The Table
"Trust Me"	2019	—	97	The Table
"Stay Up All Night" (밤새)	2019	175	98	The Table
"If We" (우리가 사랑했다면)	2019	167	99	The Table
"Moon Dance"	2020	195	100	The Nocturne
"Must" (곡)	2020	199	—	The Nocturne
"—" denotes releases that did not chart or were not released in that region.

== Music videos ==
List of music videos, showing year released and directors
Title	Year	Director(s)	Ref.
Korean
"Face"	2012	Kim Hye-jeong	
"Action"	2012	Kim Hye-jeong	
"Not Over You"	2012	Unknown	—N/a
"Sandy"	2012	Unknown	—N/a
"Hello" (여보세요)	2013	Kim Hye-jeong	
"Sleep Talking" (잠꼬대)	2013	Hong Won-ki (Zanybros)	
"Fine Girl"	2013	Unknown	—N/a
"Good Bye Bye"	2014	Hong Won-ki (Zanybros)	
"I'm Bad"	2015	Kim Jong-seong	
"Overcome" (여왕의 기사)	2016	Yoo Sung-kyun; Lim Seung-taek; Kim Hye-min	
"Love Paint (Every Afternoon)"	2016	Yoo Sung-kyun; Lim Seung-taek; Kim Hye-min	
"Daybreak"	2016	L5M (Kim Yoon)	
"Where You At"	2017	Kim Zi-yong (Fantazy Lab)	
"Dejavu"	2018	Dee Shin (Fantazy Lab)	
"I Don't Care"	2018	Illumin	
"Help Me"	2018	Vikings League	
"Universe" (별의 언어)	2019	Shin Dong-geul	
"Bet Bet"	2019	Vikings League	
"Love Me"	2019	Kim Ja-kyoung (Flexible Pictures)	
"Let's Love"	2020	Vikings League	
"I'm in Trouble"	2020	Rima Yoon, Dongju Jang (Rigend Film)	
"Best Summer"	2020	Unknown	—N/a
"Inside Out"	2021	Rima Yoon, Dongju Jang (Rigend Film)	
"Again"	2022	MOSTWANTD	
Japanese
"Shalala Ring"	2014	Nanae Takanashi	
"Na.Na.Na.Namida"	2015	Hiroki Kashiwa	
"Access to You"	2015	Takashi Yamaguchi	
"Cherry"	2015	Rikiya Imaizumi	
"Drive (Japanese Ver.)"	2020	MOSWANTD	
