= Pledis Entertainment discography =

This is a list of albums released under Pledis Entertainment.

== 2007 ==
Released	Title	Artist	Format	Language
June 20	Cry Eye	Son Dam-bi	CD, Digital download	Korean

== 2008 ==
Released	Title	Artist	Format	Language
February 29	Change The World	Son Dam-bi	Digital download	Korean
April 29	Mini Album Vol.1	Son Dam-bi	CD, digital download	Korean
August 21	Invisible Person	Son Dam-bi	Digital download	Korean
September 18	Mini Album Vol.2	Son Dam-bi	CD, digital download	Korean
November 20	Remix Vol.1	Son Dam-bi	Digital download	Korean

== 2009 ==
Released	Title	Artist	Format	Language
January 15	New Schoolgirl	After School	CD, digital download	Korean
March 23	Vol. 1 Type "B" - Back To 80's	Son Dam-bi	CD, digital download	Korean
April 9	Diva	After School	Digital download	Korean
May 22	Dream Girl	After School	Digital download	Korean
July 22	Amoled	Son Dam-bi & After School	Digital download	Korean
November 25	Because of You	After School	CD single, digital download	Korean

== 2010 ==
Released	Title	Artist	Format	Language
January 22	Because of You (Remix)	After School	Digital download	Korean
March 25	Bang!	After School	CD, digital download	Korean
June 17	The First Mini Album	Orange Caramel	CD, digital download	Korean
July 8	The Queen	Son Dam-bi	CD, digital download	Korean
November 18	The Second Mini album	Orange Caramel	CD, digital download	Korean
December 7	Happy Pledis	After School	CD, digital download	Korean

== 2011 ==
Released	Title	Artist	Format	Language
February 14	Come Back, You Bad Person	Kahi	CD, digital download	Korean
March 30	Bangkok City	Orange Caramel	CD, digital download	Korean
April 29	Virgin	After School	CD, digital download	Korean
June 21	Sok Sok Sok	Uee (After School)	Digital download	Korean
July 1	Take Me To the Place	Bekah (After School)	Digital download	Korean
July 20	Red	A.S. Red	CD, digital download	Korean
July 20	Blue	A.S. Blue	CD, digital download	Korean
August 17	Bang!	After School	CD, digital download	Japanese
October 13	Shanghai Romance	Orange Caramel	CD, digital download	Korean
November 23	Diva	After School	CD, digital download	Japanese
December 1	Happy Pledis Second Album	Happy Pledis	CD, digital download	Korean
December 16	Funny Hunny	Orange Caramel	Digital download	Korean

== 2012 ==
Released	Title	Artist	Format	Language
January 25	Rambling Girls/Because of You	After School	CD, digital download	Japanese
February 29	Just in Time	After School	Digital download	Japanese
March 14	Playgirlz	After School	CD, digital download	Japanese
March 14	Face	NU'EST	CD, digital download	Korean
May 9	Venus	Hello Venus	CD, digital download	Korean
June 13	Lady Luck/Dilly Dally	After School	CD, digital download	Japanese
June 20	Flashback	After School	CD, digital download	Korean
July 5	Like A Wave	Hello Venus	Digital download	Korean
July 11	Action	NU'EST	CD, digital download	Korean
September 5	Yasashii Akuma	Orange Caramel	CD, digital download	Japanese
September 12	Lipstick	Orange Caramel	CD, digital download	Korean
October 12	Orange Caramel Lipstick DJ Remix	Orange Caramel	Digital download	Korean
November 12	Dripping Tears	Son Dam-bi	CD, digital download	Korean
December 12	What Are You Doing Today?	Hello Venus	CD, digital download	Korean
December 12	Lipstick / Lamu no Love Song	Orange Caramel	CD, digital download	Japanese
December 13	Dashing Through the Snow in High Heels	Orange Caramel & NU'EST	Digital download	Korean

== 2013 ==
Released	Title	Artist	Format	Language
February 13	Hello	NU'EST	CD, digital download	Korean
March 6	Cookie Cream & Mint	Orange Caramel	Digital download	Japanese
March 13	Orange Caramel	Orange Caramel	CD, digital download	Japanese
March 27	THE BEST OF AFTERSCHOOL 2009-2012 -Korea Ver.-	After School	CD, digital download	Korean
May 2	Would You Stay For Tea?	Hello Venus	CD, digital download	Korean
June 13	First Love	After School	CD, digital download	Korean
August 13	Hello Venus Live Album 2013	Hello Venus	CD, digital download	Korean
August 22	Sleep Talking	NU'EST	CD, digital download	Korean
October 2	Heaven	After School	CD, digital download	Japanese
October 10	Who Are You?	Kahi	CD, digital download	Korean
November 11	Sleep Talking	NU'EST-M	Digital download	Chinese
December 23	Red Candle	Son Dam-bi	Digital download	Korean

== 2014 ==
Released	Title	Artist	Format	Language
January 29	Shh	After School	CD, digital download	Japanese
February 20	Week	After School	Digital download	Korean
March 12	Catallena	Orange Caramel	CD, digital download	Korean
March 19	Dress to Kill	After School	CD, digital download	Japanese
March 26	Who Are You? + Come Back You Bad Person	Kahi	CD, digital download	Japanese
June 12	A Midsummer Night's Sweetness	Raina (with San E)	Digital download	Korean
July 9	Re:BIRTH	NU'EST	CD, digital download	Korean
August 18	My Copycat	Orange Caramel	CD, digital download	Korean
September 30	Trying to Rewrite the End of this Novel	Han Dong Geun	Digital download	Korean
October 8	Reset	Raina	Digital download	Korean
November 5	Shalala Ring	NU'EST	CD, digital download	Japanese
December 9	Unread	Han Dong Geun	Digital download	Korean

== 2015 ==
Released	Title	Artist	Format	Language
January 23	I'm Not An Easy Girl	Lizzy	Digital download	Korean
February 11	Goodbye PMS	Lizzy (with Park Myung Soo)	Digital download	Korean
February 27	I'm Bad	NU'EST	CD, digital download	Korean
March 18	Best	After School	CD, digital download	Japanese
April 16	Between the Two of Us	Kim Jungah & Han Dong Geun	Digital download	Korean
May 20	Na.Na.Na	NU'EST	CD, digital download	Japanese
May 29	17 Carat	Seventeen	CD, digital download	Korean
July 11	Lotto	Vernon	Digital download	Korean
September 10	Boys Be	Seventeen	CD, digital download	Korean
November 24	I Don't Know	Raina	Digital download	Korean
December 4	Q&A	Seventeen (with Ailee)	Digital download	Korean

== 2016 ==
Released	Title	Artist	Format	Language
February 17	Q is	NU'EST	CD, digital download	Korean
March 23	Sickness	Vernon and Eunwoo	Digital download	Korean
April 25	Love & Letter	Seventeen	CD, digital download	Korean
June 16	Sugar and Me (달고나)	Raina (with San E)	Digital download	Korean
June 27	We	Pristin (Note: Released as "Pledis Girlz" without Nayoung and Kyulkyung)	Digital download	Korean
July 4	Love & Letter (Repackaged)	Seventeen	CD, digital download	Korean
August 22	Amazing You	Han Dong Geun	Digital download	Korean
August 29	Canvas	NU'EST	CD, digital download	Korean
December 5	Going Seventeen	Seventeen	CD, digital download	Korean

== 2017 ==
Released	Title	Artist	Format	Language
March 21	Hi! Pristin	Pristin	CD, Digital download	Korean
May 5	Your Diary	Han Dong Geun	CD, Digital download	Korean
May 19	Black Widow (Remix Ver.)	Pristin	Digital download	Korean
May 22	Al1	Seventeen	CD, Digital download	Korean
July 25	If You	NU'EST W	Digital download	Korean
July 31	Loop	Raina	CD, Digital download	Korean
August 23	Schxxl Out	Pristin	CD, Digital download	Korean
September 20	Once	Bumzu	Digital download	Korean
October 10	W, Here	NU'EST W	CD, Digital download	Korean
October 30	Just	Bumzu	Digital download	Korean
November 6	Teen, Age	Seventeen	CD, Digital download	Korean
November 10	A.C.C.E.L	Bumzu	Digital download	Korean
December 4	Broken People	Han Dong Geun	CD, Digital download	Korean
December 26	많지도 + 적지도 : 스물일곱	Bumzu	CD, Digital download	Korean

== 2018 ==
Released	Title	Artist	Format	Language]
February 5	Director's Cut	Seventeen	CD, Digital download	Korean
March 21	Just Do It	BSS	Digital download	Korean
May 28	Like a V	Pristin V	CD, Digital download	Korean
May 30	We Make You	Seventeen	CD, Digital download	Japanese
June 25	Who, You	NU'EST W	CD, Digital download	Korean
July 16	You Make My Day	Seventeen	CD, Digital download	Korean
August 27	It's Okay	Raina	Digital download	Korean
August 28	I Don't Miss You	Bumzu	Digital download	Korean
September 18	Why	Zhou Jieqiong	Digital download	Mandarin
November 26	Wake,N	NU'EST W	CD, Digital download	Korean
December 14	Can You Sit by My Side	Wen Junhui	Digital download	Mandarin

== 2019 ==
Released	Title	Artist	Format	Language
January 21	You Made My Dawn	Seventeen	CD, Digital download	Korean
March 15	A Song For You	NU'EST	Digital download	Korean
April 29	Happily Ever After	NU'EST	CD, Digital download	Korean
May 29	Happy Ending	Seventeen	CD, Digital download	Japanese
June 9	Dreams Come True	The8	Digital download	Mandarin
September 16	An Ode	Seventeen	CD, Digital download	Korean
October 21	The Table	NU'EST	CD, Digital download	Korean

== 2020 ==
Released	Title	Artist	Format	Language
April 1	Fallin' Flower	Seventeen	CD, Digital download	Japanese
May 8	Falling Down	The8	Digital download	Mandarin
May 11	The Nocturne	NU'EST	CD, Digital download	Korean
June 22	Heng:garæ	Seventeen	CD, Digital download	Korean
September 8	24H	Seventeen	CD, Digital download	Japanese
October 6	Drive	NU'EST	CD, Digital download	Japanese
October 19	; (Semicolon)	Seventeen	CD, Digital download	Korean

== 2021 ==
Released	Title	Artist	Format	Language
February 14	Silent Boarding Gate	Jun	Digital download	Mandarin
April 2	Spider	Hoshi	Digital download	Korean
April 13	Side By Side	The8	Digital download	Chinese and Korean
April 19	Romanticize	NU'EST	CD, Digital download	Korean
April 21	Not Alone	Seventeen	CD, Digital download	Japanese
May 28	Bittersweet	Wonwoo X Mingyu	Digital download	Korean
June 18	Your Choice	Seventeen	CD, Digital download	Korean
September 1	Talk & Talk	Fromis 9	CD, Digital download	Korean
October 22	Attacca	Seventeen	CD, Digital download	Korean
November 29	Power of Love	Seventeen	CD, Digital download	Japanese

== 2022 ==
Released	Title	Artist	Format	Language
January 3	Ruby	Woozi	Digital download	English
January 17	Midnight Guest	Fromis 9	CD, Digital download	Korean
March 15	Needle & Bubble	NU'EST	CD, Digital download	Korean
May 27	Face the Sun	Seventeen	CD, Digital download	Korean
June 27	From Our Memento Box	Fromis 9	CD, Digital download	Korean
July 18	Sector 17	Seventeen	CD, Digital download	Korean
September 23	Limbo	Jun	Digital download	Chinese
October 12	Absolute Zero	Baekho	CD, Digital download	Korean
November 9	Dream	Seventeen	CD, Digital download	Japanese
December 23	Black Eye	Vernon	Digital download	English

== 2023 ==
Released	Title	Artist	Format	Language
February 6	Second Wind	BSS	CD, Digital download	Korean
February 27	Truth or Lie	Hwang Min-hyun	CD, Digital download	Korean
April 24	FML	Seventeen	CD, Digital download	Korean
June 6	Unlock My World	Fromis 9	CD, Digital download	Korean
July 4	Psycho	Jun	Digital download	Chinese
August 31	Elevator	Baekho	Digital download	Korean
October 23	Seventeenth Heaven	Seventeen	CD, Digital download	Korean
November 27	Wait	Dino	Digital download	Korean
December 7	What Are We	Baekho (featuring Park Ji Won)	Digital download	Korean

== 2024 ==
Released	Title	Artist	Format	Language
January 22	Sparkling Blue	TWS	CD, Digital download	Korean
March 13	Lullaby	Hwang Min-hyun	Digital download	Korean
April 19	17 is Right Here	Seventeen	CD, Digital download	Korean
May 8	Love or Die	Baekho & Bigone	Digital download	Korean
June 17	This Man	Jeonghan x Wonwoo	CD, Digital download	Korean
June 24	Summer Beat!	TWS	CD, Digital download	Korean
August 12	Supersonic	Fromis 9	CD, Digital download	Korean
September 4	Nutty Nutty	Baekho	Digital download	Korean
October 18	Spill the Feels	Seventeen	CD, Digital download	Korean
November 25	Last Bell	TWS	Digital download	Korean
