= Night Goblin =

South Korean television series

- Also known as: Midnight Madness
- Genre: Reality-variety show
- Starring: Lee Soo-geun; Jeong Hyeong-don; Park Sung-kwang; Lee Hong-gi; Kim Jong-hyeon
- Country of origin: South Korea
- Original language: Korean
- No. of seasons: 1
- No. of episodes: 32

Production
- Producer: Lee Ji-sun
- Production location: South Korea
- Running time: 80 minutes

Original release
- Network: JTBC
- Release: July 30, 2017 – March 18, 2018

Night Goblin (Korean: 밤도깨비) is a South Korean television program starring Lee Soo-geun, Jeong Hyeong-don, Park Sung-kwang, Lee Hong-gi and Kim Jong-hyeon. It is a reality show where in each episode, the cast will attempt to be the first in line to enter various popular places for food or recreation throughout South Korea.

JTBC runs the show in prominent Sunday evenings time slot, at 18:30 (KST), starting with the first airdate on July 30, 2017.

On 26 February 2018 JTBC announced that the program will have its final episode in mid-March. The last episode was aired on March 18.

== Cast ==
Name	Nickname(s)	Duration	Notes
Lee Soo-geun	Master-of-Skits Goblin; Hasty Goblin	Episode 1 – 32	Acting as main MC and in-charge of on-the-spot skits and the oldest among the Goblins.
Jeong Hyeong-don	Furious Goblin; Senior Jung; Crazy Goblin	Episode 1 – 32	Second oldest of the Goblins and always the first one to explode and complain about why they need to camp overnight.
Park Sung-kwang	Leader Goblin; "Main MC"; Park Pyongyang	Episode 1 – 32	Likes to act as the main MC and sometimes gives comments and instructions to the Goblins through their group chat.
Lee Hong-gi	Hong Goblin; Hong-Kwang; Self-Proclaimed Smart Goblin	Episode 2 – 32 (absent in episodes 10, 11)	Member of rock band F.T. Island. Always try to act as the smart one among the Goblins. Known as the only one Lee Soo-geun fears.
Kim Jong-hyeon (JR)	Baby Goblin; Weak Goblin; Variety Goblin; Kim Heh Heh Heh	Episode 2 – 32 (absent in episodes 27, 28)	Member of boy band NU'EST. The youngest of the Goblins and always spoiled and fawned by the older Goblins. Seen to have a weak lower body. Known for his "Heh Heh Heh" laugh.

=== Former ===
Name	Nickname(s)	Duration	Notes
Chun Jung-myung	Chun-Kwang; Fighter Chun	Episode 9 – 19 (absent in episodes 14, 15)	Actor. First fixed variety show in his career. Known for his strength when hitting butts. On January 8, 2018, JTBC has announced that he has left the show due to schedule conflicts.

== Program ==
The special rule mentioned is that if the group did not manage to get in first place, they will have to reattempt to get first place again for the same main mission.

=== Current ===
From episode 27, the Night Goblins will take on a team of guests for broadcast airtime. The concept of No Nights 2 Days will still go on. Both teams will have their own hot places to recommend and go by themselves, and depending on the editors of the show, airtime is allocated to each team as they favour.

=== Former ===
In each episode, the cast and guest(s) gather together at around 12 a.m. (KST), then proceed to their base camp, which was set up nearby the popular place. The base camp was set up such that the group are able to monitor the popular place for any movements. At the base camp, they will be camping overnight and, in the next morning, attempt to be the first in line as a team to enter the popular place. Before the start of the overnight camping, the group's handphones are confiscated. The reason being, if not, the group can just set alarms on their phones and wake up in the morning just in time to start to get for first place, which is not allowed at all.

During the overnight camping, a time fairy will appear to help the cast by telling the time and get the cast to play the time fairy's game to get over the overnight camping and elevate the chances of entering in first place.

From episode 6, the show's production concept was altered (to No Nights 2 Days) so that filming on each location is now split into 2 episodes, with first half filmed during the day. The first of every 2 episodes will not involve overnight camping, as the targeted hot place(s) opens either at noon, evening or night. The second will involve the original concept of the program. Team and individual battles will also be introduced. Guest(s) are invited to spend the day and/or night together with the cast.

== Episodes ==
=== 2017 ===
List of episodes (1 – 21)
- The reference mark (※) is used to denote the "time fairy" among other guests in any particular episode.

Ep. #	Broadcast Date	Location	Hot picks	Guest(s)	Note(s)
1	July 30	Geundeok-myeon, Samcheok	Korean twisted doughnuts	Seungkwan (Seventeen) Soyou※	
2	August 6	Ganghwa Island	Gimbap	Kei (Lovelyz)※	Kim Jong-hyun and Lee Hong-gi join as permanent casts
3	August 13	Yongin	Mega Storm at Caribbean Bay Water Park	Mamamoo (Solar, Wheein)※	
4	August 20	Goyang	Slide on the swimming pool at Bukhansan Water Park	Choi Jung-won Yura (Girl's Day)※	Lee Hong-gi joined the group later due to FT Island concert
5	August 27	Gunsan	Anpan and vegetable buns from Lee Sung Dang	Cao Lu (Fiestar)※	The Time Fairy, Cao Lu, joins the cast for the remainder of the overnight camping after the game until the end of the episode
6	September 3	Busan	Toast from a popular toast truck; Late night ramen from a popular ramen roadside stall	No guests	Special voice appearance by Park Shin-hye through phone; Change in concept of the program from this episode
7	September 10	Busan	Busan Air Cruise	Lee Yi-kyung Jang Sung-kyu※	
8	September 17	Gangneung	Seasoned cockles bibimbap from a seafood restaurant; Bohemian Roasters coffee; Joongang Market (Kim Jong-hyun's parents had set up a food stall in it in the past); Anmok Coffee Street	No guests	
9	September 24	Gangneung	Gyeongpodae Pavilion; Chodang Soft Tofu	Jang Sung-kyu※	Chun Jung-myung joins as permanent cast
10	October 8	Jeonju	Lettuce wrapped deep fried food; Bibimbap Waffle; Jeonju Nambu Traditional Market night market street food	No guests	Lee Hong-gi is absent due to FT Island's Japan concert tour
11	October 15	Jeonju	Perilla seed noodle; Mul-Jajangmyeon	B1A4 (Jinyoung, Gongchan)	Lee Hong-gi is absent due to FT Island's Japan concert tour
12	October 22	Suwon	Paldalmun Namun Market food trucks; Helium balloon (Flying Suwon)	No guests	The cast challenges to be the last in line to ride the Flying Suwon
13	October 29	Suwon	Suwon Tongdak street; Hwaseong Fortress; Steamed buns shop at Paldalmun Namun Market; Army stew restaurant	Kim Won-hyo; Shim Jin-hwa; Baekho (NU'EST); BUMZU; Oh Na-mi	The guests were contacted through phone by the cast before their appearances
14	November 5	Seoul	Dongdaemun Silk Road; Crêpe roadside stall at Dongdaemun; Noodle shop (Soi Yeonnam) at Yeonnam-dong	Tiger JK	Kim Jong-hyun joined the group later due to scheduled filming of Music Bank; Chun Jung-myung is absent due to scheduled filming of movie
15	November 12	Seoul	Boat at Han River; Gimbap shop at Sadang-dong; Haejang-guk shop at Mangwon-dong	Tiger JK	Special appearances by Kim Jae-won (PD of JTBC program Perfect On Paper), Kim Do-il (staff of JTBC Contents Hub), Shin Young-kwang (PD of JTBC program My Foreign Friends) and Choi Chang-soo (PD of JTBC program Knowing Bros); Chun Jung-myung is absent due to scheduled filming of movie
16	November 19	Jeju Island	Deep fried Jeju Black pig, deep fried cuttlefish and Tteok-bokki from a snack shop; Rice with octopus restaurant	BoA	First time in the show's history to have failed to be first in line (for rice with octopus); everyone was not to eat it. However, after negotiating with the PD, only BoA gets to eat it
17	November 26	Jeju Island	Pistol Prawn sashimi restaurant in Aewol-eup; Abalone cold raw fish soup restaurant; Abalone Gimbap and seasoned squid from a gimbap shop	BoA	
18	December 3	Yangpyeong	Mushroom hotpot restaurant; Dumulmeori; Lotus leaves hotdog; Gaegun Middle School (Lee Soo-geun's alma mater); Seolleongtang restaurant	No guests	Lee Hong-gi joined the group later at the Seolleongtang restaurant after having surgery in a hospital earlier on
19	December 10	Pyeongchang	Buckwheat crunchy fried chicken restaurant; Yongpyong Ski Resort Gondola; Stewed kimchi restaurant	Hyun Jin-young Duetto	
20	December 17	Incheon	Milk cream bread and chestnut bread from a bread shop in Namdong District; Egg Bread shop; Crunchy Balloon Bread shop; Red bead pancake from a pancake shop (Hongdubyeong); Jayu Park; Galbi restaurant	Jo Woo-jong	Special voice appearance by Ji Sang-ryeol through phone; Due to scheduled filming of movie leading to schedule conflicts, Chun Jung-myung has left the show starting this episode
—	December 24	—	—	No guests	Special compilation episode of the first 20 episodes
21	December 31	Pohang	Noodles produced from the Jeil Noodles Factory; Gwamegi restaurant; Hard-boiled beef head meat soup restaurant; Steamed giant crab shop	Chang Kiha	Night Goblin Express Delivery special; Special voice appearances by Oh Hyuk of Hyukoh, Jae-gyun Hwang and Lee Juck through phone

=== 2018 ===
List of episodes (22 – present)

Ep. #	Broadcast Date	Location	Hot picks	Guest(s)	Note(s)
22	January 7	Pohang	Homigot; Mori Noodles restaurant	Chang Kiha	The group did a Busking Guerrilla concert at Pohang University of Science and Technology
23	January 14	Seongnam	Tonkatsu takeout shop; Coin Karaoke shop; Sledding Hill; Tonkatsu Naengmyeon	Gugudan (Sejeong, Mina)	Winter Vacation special; Special appearance by child dancer Na Ha-eun
24	January 21	Seongnam	Cheonggukjang restaurant; Black sesame pasta at a brunch restaurant	Ji Sang-ryeol; Sejeong (Gugudan)	Winter Vacation special
25	January 28	Seoul	Egg sandwich and tonkatsu sandwich at a Japanese Western restaurant in Itaewon; Cafe at Songpa District; Bibim Ramen at Songpa-dong	Kim Ji-won	Luxury Special
26	February 4	Seoul	24 hours arcade at Gangnam District; Dried pollack stew at Gangnam District; Kimchi Bulgogi stew set at Yongsan District	Kim Ji-won	Coffee truck and handwritten letters from Oh Dal-su and Kim Myung-min were placed at the base camp as a surprise for Kim Ji-won
27	February 11	Seoul	Galbi restaurant at Mullae-dong; Bowling alley at Gangnam District; Bowling alley at Mullae-dong; Jajang Udon from a restaurant at Gayang-dong	Song Eun-i; Kim Sook; Ahn Young-mi; Park Ji-seon; Kim Min-kyung; Oh Na-mi	Lunar New Year Special - Broadcast Duration Battle #1: Night Goblins VS Song Eun-yi Division (Sudden MT - Hot Place That Only Belongs To Me); Kim Jong-hyun is absent due to illness; Special appearances by Narsha of Brown Eyed Girls, Narsha's husband Hwang Tae-kyung, Lee Ye-na, Lee Se-min and Shin Soo-ji
28	February 18	Seoul; Gangneung	Kalguksu from a Pojangmacha at Yeomchang-dong; Hut at Gangneung; Jjimjilbang at Yongsan District; Jjamppong Soft Tofu at Gangneung; Doenjang-jjigae set at Gangnam District; Chapssal-tteok shop at Gangneung	Song Eun-i; Kim Sook; Ahn Young-mi; Park Ji-seon	Lunar New Year Special - Broadcast Duration Battle #1: Night Goblins VS Song Eun-yi Division (Sudden MT - Hot Place That Only Belongs To Me); Kim Jong-hyun is absent due to illness; Special appearance by PD Kim Jae-won
29	February 25	Cheonan; Ilsan; Paju	Soy sauce seasoned cockles restaurant at Ilsan; Stewed back ribs restaurant at Cheonan; Drive-in theater at Paju; Walnut cookies at Cheonan; 24-hour cafe and car wash at Paju	Song Eun-i; Kim Sook; Ahn Young-mi; Park Ji-seon	Broadcast Duration Battle #2: Night Goblins VS Song Eun-yi Division (Random MT); Lee Hong-gi joined the group later due to other schedules
30	March 4	Seocheon; Paju	Pension at Seocheon; Open-air bath at Paju; Octopus fishing boat at Seocheon; Gamaksan suspension bridge; Haejang-guk shop at Seocheon; Chicken & seafood soup at Paju	Song Eun-i; Kim Sook; Ahn Young-mi; Park Ji-seon	Broadcast Duration Battle #2: Night Goblins VS Song Eun-yi Division (Random MT)
31	March 11	Daegu; Gapyeong	Gopchang hotpot restaurant at Daegu; Dak-galbi restaurant at Gapyeong; Dessert cafe at Daegu; E-World Tower at Daegu	Kim Byung-man; Park Jung-chul; Niel (Teen Top)	Broadcast Duration Battle #3: Night Goblins VS Byung-man Tribe (Park Sung-kwang joins the Byung-man Tribe)
32	March 18	Daegu; Gapyeong	Megaswing 360 and Air Race from E-World theme park at Daegu; Corn bread from a bread shop in Daegu; Chicken coop (lays blue eggs) in Gapyeong	Kim Byung-man; Park Jung-chul; Niel (Teen Top)	Broadcast Duration Battle #3: Night Goblins VS Byung-man Tribe (Park Sung-kwang joins the Byung-man Tribe)

=== Unaired episode ===
Episode 21 (which was supposed to be aired on December 24, 2017), originally the 2nd half of the Incheon trip and Christmas Special, was supposed to feature SHINee's Jonghyun & Minho as guests. However, on December 18, 2017 Jonghyun suddenly passed away in a suspected suicide. Following the initial news, JTBC Entertainment's YouTube channel has made the video of the episode teaser (uploaded a day prior) "unavailable". It was later announced that the episode will be (initially) put on hold until further notice, with the episode on December 24, 2017 (the original broadcast date) to be a special broadcast of the show.

== Ratings ==
In the ratings below, the highest rating for the show will be in red, and the lowest rating for the show will be in blue each year.

=== 2017 ===
List of ratings (episode 1 – 21)

Ep. #	Broadcast date	Average audience share		
Ep. #	Broadcast date	AGB Nielsen		TNmS Ratings
Ep. #	Broadcast date	Nationwide	Seoul Capital Area	Nationwide
1	July 30	1.675%	NR	1.8%
2	August 6	1.262%	NR	1.8%
3	August 13	1.391%	NR	1.7%
4	August 20	1.185%	NR	1.7%
5	August 27	1.445%	NR	2.1%
6	September 3	1.828%	NR	2.4%
7	September 10	1.638%	NR	2.3%
8	September 17	2.788%	3.117%	3.3%
9	September 24	2.571%	2.750%	2.9%
10	October 8	2.339%	2.567%	2.8%
11	October 15	1.738%	NR	2.1%
12	October 22	2.025%	NR	2.3%
13	October 29	2.634%	3.290%	3.3%
14	November 5	2.085%	NR	2.5%
15	November 12	2.299%	2.362%	2.7%
16	November 19	2.161%	2.219%	2.8%
17	November 26	2.302%	NR	2.3%
18	December 3	2.307%	2.558%	2.1%
19	December 10	2.169%	2.418%	2.1%
20	December 17	2.627%	2.640%	2.7%
21	December 31	1.123%	NR	1.5%

=== 2018 ===
List of ratings (episode 22 – present)

Ep. #	Broadcast date	Average audience share		
Ep. #	Broadcast date	AGB Nielsen		TNmS Ratings
Ep. #	Broadcast date	Nationwide	Seoul Capital Area	Nationwide
22	January 7	1.620%	NR	1.7%
23	January 14	1.528%	NR	1.9%
24	January 21	1.486%	NR	1.6%
25	January 28	1.679%	NR	2.0%
26	February 4	1.442%	NR	1.9%
27	February 11	1.868%	NR	2.1%
28	February 18	2.083%	NR	2.4%
29	February 25	1.538%	NR	2.0%
30	March 4	1.204%	NR	1.6%
31	March 11	1.275%	NR	1.4%
32	March 18	1.326%	NR	1.7%

- Note that the show airs on a cable channel (pay TV), which plays part in its slower uptake and relatively small audience share when compared to programs broadcast (FTA) on public networks such as KBS, SBS, MBC or EBS.
- NR rating means "not reported".
