= Bridge the World =

- Digital and regular edition cover

Studio album by NU'EST
- Released: November 18, 2015
- Recorded: 2014–2015
- Genre: J-pop
- Length: 40:03 (regular); 45:40 (limited B)
- Label: Ariola Japan

NU'EST chronology
Re:Birth (2014)	Bridge the World (2015)	Q is (2016)

Singles from Bridge the World
- 1. "Shalala Ring" Released: November 5, 2014; 2. "Nanananamida" Released: May 20, 2015

Bridge the World is the Japanese debut studio album of South Korean boy band NU'EST and their second studio album overall. The album was released on November 18, 2015.

== Background and release ==
Bridge the World is the Japanese debut studio album of NU'EST. The album was released under Ariola Japan on November 18, 2015. The album was released in three versions: a regular edition and two limited editions with bonus tracks and exclusive DVDs.

== Composition ==
The album was described as having many "bright and fun" songs. "Cherry" is the theme song of the film Their Distance, which all the members starred in.

"Koisuru Hi" is Minhyun's solo song released on the limited edition B version of the album. Katsuhiko Yamamoto, who had previously written songs for TVXQ's Japanese albums, had written the song while picturing him.

== Reception ==
The album debuted at #7 in the Oricon Weekly Albums Chart and charted for 2 weeks, selling 22,754 physical copies. In South Korea, the album sold 1,655 copies.

== Track listing ==
No.	Title	Lyrics	Music	Length
1.	"Access to You"	Chiemi Itō	SiZK/Musoh	4:38
2.	"Let's Go Crazy!"	U-cha	U-cha	2:56
3.	"Cherry"	Chiemi Itō	SiZK/Musoh	3:49
4.	"Bridge the World"	Katsuhiko Yamamoto	Katsuhiko Yamamoto; Uru	5:13
5.	"Nanananamida" (NA.NA.NA.涙 lit. T-T-T-Tears)	Nice73	Bruce; Mason	3:59
6.	"Ame Nochi Eien" (雨のち永遠 lit. An Eternity of Endless Rain)	Nice73	Kenji Kabashima; WolfJunk	4:31
7.	"Flying Angel"	Nice73	Uru; Maxx Song; Casper	4:04
8.	"Koisuru Wonderland" (恋するWonderland lit. Fall in Love Wonderland)	Nice73	Seiji Motoyama; Andrew Choi; 220	3:30
9.	"Shalala Ring"	Nice73	Bruce	3:33
10.	"Hey, Love" (Japanese ver.)			3:50

Limited edition Type A – physical edition
No.	Title	Length
11.	"Cherry" (English ver.; bonus track)
12.	"Bridge the World" (English ver.; bonus track)
13.	"I'm Bad" (bonus track)
14.	"A Scene Without You" (僕と同じお茶を飲んで lit. Drink the Same Tea as Me, bonus track)
15.	"Aftermath" (後遺症, bonus track)

Limited edition Type B – physical edition
No.	Title	Lyrics	Music	Length
11.	"Koisuru Hi" (恋する日 lit. The Day I Fall in Love, bonus track)	Katsuhiko Yamamoto	Katsuhiko Yamamoto	5:37
Total length:				45:40

Limited edition Type A – DVD
No.	Title	Length
1.	"Hello" (ヨボセヨ, NU'EST Live Tour: Show Time 3)
2.	"Darkness" (NU'EST Live Tour: Show Time 3)
3.	"The Girl Next Door" (NU'EST Live Tour: Show Time 3)
4.	"Good Bye Bye" (NU'EST Live Tour: Show Time 3)
5.	"Don't Wear Revealing Clothes" (NU'EST Live Tour: Show Time 3)
6.	"I'm Bad" (NU'EST Live Tour: Show Time 3)
7.	"Nanananamida" (NU'EST Live Tour: Show Time 3)
8.	"Climax" (NU'EST Live Tour: Show Time 3)
9.	"Not Over You" (NU'EST Live Tour: Show Time 3)
10.	"Hey, Love" (Japanese ver., NU'EST Live Tour: Show Time 3)
11.	"A Scene Without You" (僕と同じお茶を飲んで, NU'EST Live Tour: Show Time 3)
12.	"Give Me a Shoulder" (肩をかして, NU'EST Live Tour: Show Time 3)
13.	"Himawari no Yakusoku" (ひまわりの約束, NU'EST Live Tour: Show Time 3)
14.	"NU, Establish, Style, Tempo" (NU'EST Live Tour: Show Time 3)
15.	"Face" (NU'EST Live Tour: Show Time 3)
16.	"Beautiful Ghost" (NU'EST Live Tour: Show Time 3)
17.	"Big Deal" (NU'EST Live Tour: Show Time 3)
18.	"Shalala Ring" (NU'EST Live Tour: Show Time 3)
19.	"Flying Angel" (NU'EST Live Tour: Show Time 3)
20.	"Fine Girl" (NU'EST Live Tour: Show Time 3)
21.	"Sandy" (Japanese ver., NU'EST Live Tour: Show Time 3)
22.	"Sleep Talking" (NU'EST Live Tour: Show Time 3)
23.	"Beautiful Solo" (NU'EST Live Tour: Show Time 3)
24.	"I'm Bad" (music video)
25.	"Aftermath" (後遺症, music video)

Limited edition Type B – DVD
No.	Title	Length
1.	"A Close Look at NU'EST's Day Off! A Fun Sports & BBQ Event with Everyone" (NU’ESTの休日に密着!~みんなで楽しくアスレチック&BBQ~)

== Charts ==
Chart (2015)	Peak position
Gaon International Digital Chart	34
Oricon Weekly Albums Chart	7
