= Nuest =

Nuest may refer to:

- NU'EST, a South Korean boyband
- 12504 Nuest, a main-belt asteroid
