= Happily Ever After (EP) =

- Cover of the digital release

EP by NU'EST
- Released: April 29, 2019
- Genre: K-pop
- Length: 20:17 (digital); 23:38 (physical)
- Label: Pledis Entertainment
- Producer: Baekho; Bumzu

NU'EST chronology
Canvas (2016)	Happily Ever After (2019)	The Table (2019)

Singles from Happily Ever After
- 1. "Universe" Released: April 3, 2019; 2. "Bet Bet" Released: April 29, 2019

Happily Ever After is the sixth Korean extended play by the South Korean boy band NU'EST, released on April 29, 2019.

== Background and release ==
Happily Ever After is the first album release from NU'EST since Canvas in 2016, marking the return of the group as five after Minhyun's activities with Wanna One had ended earlier in 2019. The album was later confirmed to be in production on April 13, 2019. Happily Ever After was released on April 29, 2019; to accompany its release, the physical version was bundled with a 92-page photobook in four different versions, CD artwork featuring one of the five members at random, and two random photocards (with 10 total collectible).

== Composition ==
The title track of Happily Ever After, "Bet Bet", is the final part in the "Three-part Knight Series" that began in NU'EST's 2016 extended play, Q is. It is described as a future bass song composed of "whistling synths" and "staccatoed beats", with lyrics about an "addiction-like love." The song "Different" was described as having a part that sounds like "going through the universe."

Minhyun's solo song "Universe" was released digitally on April 3, 2019 along with its music video as a pre-release track. The music video was filmed in Budapest and Milan. The song was later included in physical releases of Happily Ever After.

== Reception ==
Happily Ever After peaked at #1 on the Gaon Music Chart. The album sold over 250,000 physical copies in South Korea, and it was certified platinum. It debuted at #8 on the US Billboard World Albums Chart, while "Bet Bet" peaked at #2 on the Billboard Korea K-pop 100. The music video for "Bet Bet" drew 10 million views on YouTube in one week after it was posted.

== Track listing ==
All tracks are written by Baekho and Bumzu

No.	Title	Lyrics	Music	Arrangement	Length
1.	"Segno"	Baekho; JR; Bumzu	Bumzu; Baekho; Park Gi-tae	Bumzu; Park Gi-tae	3:58
2.	"Bet Bet"	Baekho; JR; Bumzu	Bumzu; Baekho; Royal Dive	Royal Dive	3:20
3.	"Bass"	Baekho; JR; Bumzu	Bumzu; Baekho	Bumzu; Anchor	3:10
4.	"Talk About Love"	Baekho; JR; Bumzu	Bumzu; Baekho	Bumzu; Anchor	3:10
5.	"Different"	Baekho; JR; Bumzu	Bumzu; Baekho; Park Gi-tae	Bumzu; Park Gi-tae	3:08
6.	"Fine"	Baekho; JR; Bumzu	Bumzu; Baekho	Bumzu	3:31

Physical edition
No.	Title	Lyrics	Music	Arrangement	Length
7.	"Universe" (별의 언어 lit. Star Language; Minhyun solo)	Minhyun; Bumzu; Seo Ji-eum	Bumzu; Park Gi-tae	Bumzu; Park Gi-tae	3:21
Total length:					23:38

== Charts ==
=== Weekly charts ===
Chart (2019)	Peak position
South Korean Albums (Gaon)	1
US World Albums (Billboard)	8

=== Year-end charts ===
Chart (2019)	Position
South Korean Albums (Gaon)	23

== Accolades ==
=== Music programs awards ===
Song	Program	Date
"Bet Bet"	Show Champion (MBC Music)	May 8, 2019
"Bet Bet"	M Countdown (Mnet)	May 9, 2019
"Bet Bet"	Music Bank (KBS2)	May 10, 2019
"Bet Bet"	Show Champion (MBC Music)	May 22, 2019
