= Haruka Kinami =

Japanese actress (born 1985)

- 木南 晴夏
- Born: August 9, 1985 (age 41); Toyonaka, Osaka Prefecture, Japan
- Occupation: Actress
- Years active: 2002 - present
- Spouse: Hiroshi Tamaki (m. 2018)
- Children: 2
- Website: Official profile

Haruka Kinami (木南 晴夏, Kinami Haruka; born August 9, 1985, in Toyonaka, Osaka Prefecture, Japan) is a Japanese actress who is affiliated with Horipro.

== Biography ==
In 2001, Kinami was chosen to be the Japanese High School Baseball Championship PR schoolgirl during high school. In the same year, she won the Grand Prix at the Horipro New Star Audition.

In 2002, while planning to appear in the variety series, Hiroyuki Yabe no Offer shi Chaimashita, Kinami was asked by Hiroyuki Yabe to appear in a commercial. In addition, she was selected for the female idol unit, TV Asahi Angel Eye 2002. From 2002 to 2003, Kinami appeared in the idol unit Licca. From 2004 to 2005, she appeared in the variety series Fuko no Hosoku. She played Sachiko in a reproducible drama. In 2008, Kinami graduated from Faculty of Letters of Kokugakuin University.

In 2009, she played Kyoko Koizumi in the film, 20th Century Boys, and was also evaluated in supervision and authorship. In 2013, Kinami's first main role in a film was Hyaku-nen no Tokei (directed by Shusuke Kaneko) as Ryo Kandaka.

== Personal life ==
Kinami attended Korean school for a year as a hobby and is able to speak basic Korean.

== Filmography ==
=== TV series ===
Year	Title	Role	Other notes	Ref.
2006	Akihabara@Deep	Kaira (masochistic girl corps)	Episode 4	
2007	Sexy Voice and Robo	Manami	Episode 5	
2007	Detective School Q	Maki Nishizawa	Episode 7	
2009	Zeni Geba	Akane Mikuni		
2010	Code Blue	Yukina Kijima	Episode 4	
2010	Sunao ni Narenakute	Park Minha		
2010	Teppan	Chiharu Tanaka (photo/recollection)		
2010	Mori no Asagao	Kana Mochizuki		
2011	Yūsha Yoshihiko	Murasaki		
2011	Nazotoki wa Dinner no Ato de	Hitomi Yoshimoto	Episode 1	
2015	Massan	Emma Kameyama (37 years old from 25 years old)	Asadora	
2018	Fubuki Koshiji Monogatari	Tokiko Iwatani		
2018	Princess Jellyfish	Jiji		
2018	Boys Over Flowers Season 2	Arisa Konno		
2018	Jimmy: The True Story of a True Idiot	Kyōko Takamiya		
2019	Tokusatsu Gagaga	Yūko Kitashiro		
2019	Sherlock: Untold Stories	Karen Moji	Special episode	
2022	I Will Be Your Bloom	Yūri Nakamachi		
2023	Sexy Tanaka-san	Kyōko Tanaka	Lead role	
2025	The Hot Spot	Ayano Okada		

=== Films ===
Year	Title	Role	Other notes	Ref.
2009	20th Century Boys: The Last Hope	Kyoko Koizumi		
2009	20th Century Boys: Redemption	Kyoko Koizumi		
2013	Hentai Kamen			
2014	Clover	Kazuyo Yagami		
2015	April Fools	Part-time woman		
2016	Kōfuku no Alibi			
2016	Their Distance	Kanako Koda		
2019	Crayon Shin-chan: Honeymoon Hurricane ~The Lost Hiroshi~	Indy Junko (voice)		
2019	The Great War of Archimedes			
2019	At the End of the Matinee	Kana		
2021	Perfect Strangers	An Mukai		
2023	Shylock's Children	Maki Handa		
2023	IWe're Millennials. Got a Problem?: The Movie	Choi Shin-hye		
2024	Oi Handsome!!	Yuka		
2025	Under Ninja	Ai Kawado		
2025	A Bad Summer	Kasumi Furukawa		
2025	Baka's Identity	Yuika		
2026	Sgt. Frog: Upon Revival, Immediately Facing the Threat of Earth's Destruction!	Murasaki (voice)		
2026	Mentor	Ryoko Nomoto		
