= Hanae Kan =

Japanese actress (born 1990)

- 韓 英恵
- Born: November 7, 1990 (age 35); Shizuoka Prefecture, Japan
- Other name: Han Young-hye (한영혜)
- Occupation: Actress
- Years active: 2001-present
- Agent: DogSugar
- Height: 161 cm (5 ft 3 in)

Korean name
- Hangul: 한영혜
- Hanja: 韓英恵
- RR: Han Yeonghye
- MR: Han Yŏnghye
- Website: www.dogsugar.co.jp/hanae-kan.html

Hanae Kan (韓 英恵, Kan Hanae; born November 7, 1990) is a South Korean actress based in Japan. Kan made her film debut in 2001 in Pistol Opera. She has also starred in Nobody Knows, Dead Run, Memo, and Asia no Junshin.

== Early life ==
Kan was born in Shizuoka Prefecture, Japan to a Korean father and a Japanese mother. Her father is a Korean immigrant, while her mother is a second-generation Korean-Japanese. She is fluent in Japanese and Korean.

== Filmography ==
=== Film ===
Year	Title	Role	Notes	Ref(s).
2001	Pistol Opera	Kayoko	Debut acting role	
2004	Nobody Knows	Saki Mizuguchi		
2005	Dead Run	Eri	Lead role	
2006	Nightmare Detective	Yuko Kikugawa		
2008	Nightmare Detective 2	Yuko Kikugawa		
2010	Villain	Tanimoto		
2012	11:25 The Day He Chose His Own Fate	Makiko		
2013	Petal Dance	Kyoko		
2015	Their Distance	Han Suna		
2015	West North West	Kei	Lead role	
2016	Bitter Honey	Maruko Maruta		
2016	Yamato (California)	Sakura	Lead role	
2017	Love and Other Cults	Reika		
2018	The Chrysanthemum and the Guillotine	Tamae Tokachigawa		
2019	A Banana? At This Time of Night?	Yoshie Izumi		
2019	One Night	Maki Ushiku		
2021	We Made a Beautiful Bouquet			
2022	My Small Land			
