= If You (NU'EST W song) =

Single by NU'EST W
- Released: July 25, 2017
- Genre: K-pop
- Length: 3:27
- Label: Pledis; CJ E&M
- Composer(s): Kiggen; Choi Jinkyung
- Lyricist(s): Kiggen; Rhymer; JR (NU'EST)
- Producer(s): Kiggen; Choi Jinkyung

NU'EST W singles chronology
"If You" (2017)	"Where You At" (2017)

"If You" (Korean: 있다면; RR: itdamyeon) is the debut single by South Korean boy group special unit NU'EST W, composed of JR, Aron, Baekho and Ren. It was released as a digital single on July 25, 2017, by Pledis Entertainment and distributed by CJ E&M Music.

== Release ==
The song was released as a digital single on July 25, 2017, through several music portals, including MelOn in South Korea and iTunes globally.

== Commercial performance ==
"If You" debuted and peaked at number 2 on the Gaon Digital Chart, on the chart issue dated July 23 to 29, 2017. The song sold 126,434 downloads and accumulated 1,823,780 streams in its first week. In its second week, the song fell to number 11 and to number 22 in its third and final week.

The song entered at number 29 on the Gaon Digital Chart for the month of July 2017, with 143,135 downloads sold.

== Track listing ==
Digital download
No.	Title	Lyrics	Music	Arrangement	Length
1.	"If You" (있다면; issdamyeon)	Kiggen; Rhymer; JR (NU'EST)	Kiggen; Choi Jinkyung	Kiggen; Choi Jinkyung	3:27

== Charts ==
Chart (2017)	Peak position
South Korea (Gaon Digital Chart)	2

== Release history ==
Region	Date	Format	Label
South Korea	July 25, 2017	Digital download	Pledis Entertainment, CJ E&M
Worldwide	July 25, 2017	Digital download	Pledis Entertainment
