= Nene Chicken =

South Korean fried chicken restaurant franchise

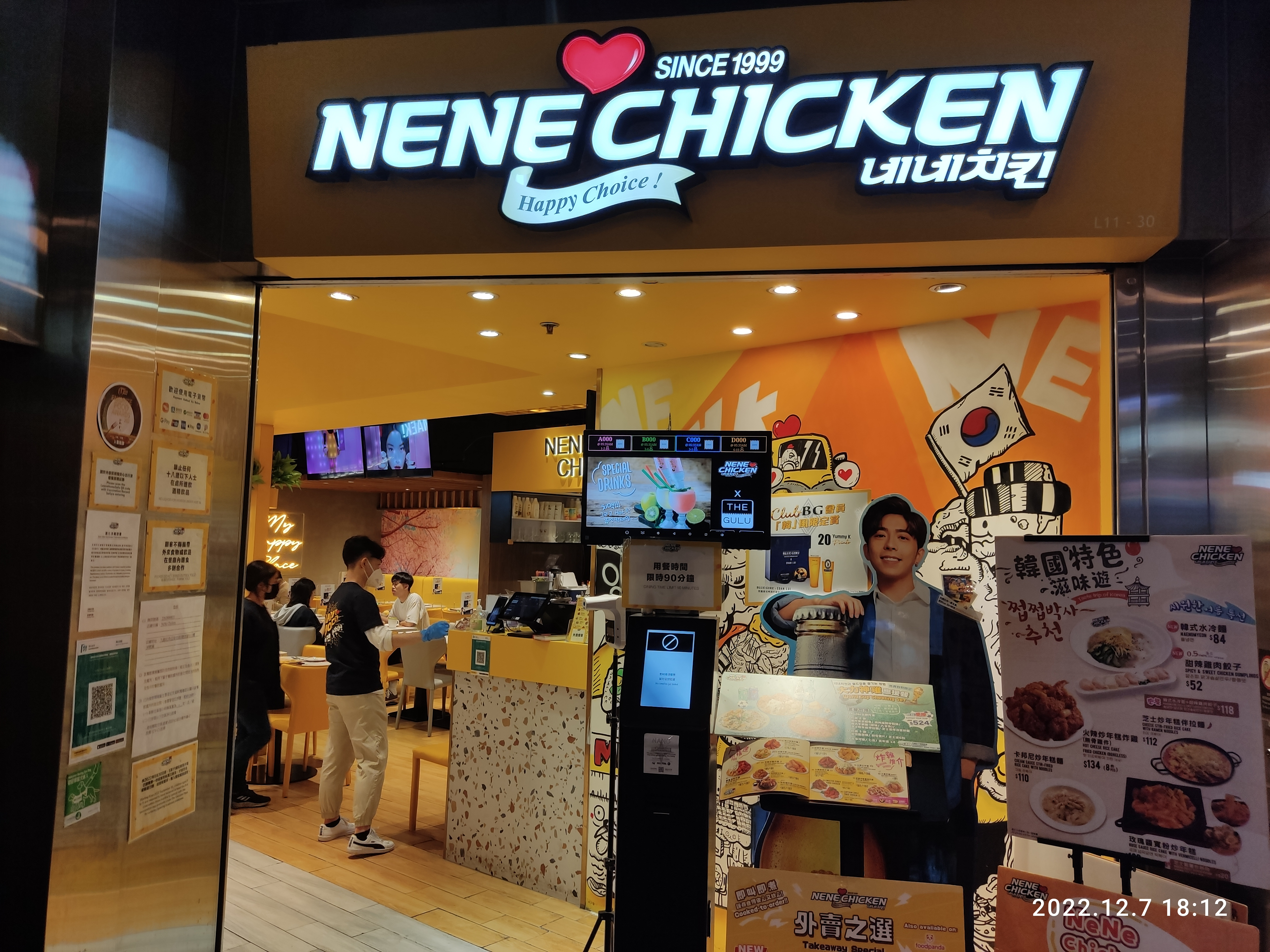
- A Nene Chicken outlet in Hong Kong in 2022
- Native name: 네네치킨
- Founded: May 1999; 27 years ago
- Headquarters: South Korea
- Website: nenechicken.com

Nene Chicken (Korean: 네네치킨; RR: ne ne chikin; lit. 'yes yes chicken') is a South Korean-based international fried chicken restaurant franchise. In November 2018, Nene Chicken was represented by NU'EST W and Seventeen, serving as the brand's models.

== International locations ==
Franchises outside South Korea currently exist in Canada, United Arab Emirates, Hong Kong, Taiwan, Thailand, Malaysia, Singapore, Australia, and Japan. The company has also announced plans to open 18 outlets in New Zealand. It opened its first store in the Philippines in April 2024 at One Ayala.
