= Canvas (NU'EST EP) =

EP by NU'EST
- Released: August 29, 2016
- Recorded: 2016
- Genre: K-pop
- Length: 17:08
- Language: Korean
- Label: Pledis Entertainment; Loen Entertainment

NU'EST chronology
Q is (2016)	Canvas (2016)	Happily Ever After (2019)

Singles from Canvas
- 1. "Love Paint" Released: August 29, 2016; 2. "Daybreak" Released: October 6, 2016

Canvas is the fifth Korean extended play by South Korean boy group NU'EST. It was released on August 29, 2016 by Pledis Entertainment and distributed by Loen Entertainment. The extended play features five original tracks.

== Background ==
On August 20, 2016, NU'EST released a series of individual teaser images, along with a group image. The following days, individual teaser videos and the official teaser were revealed, following with a highlight medley. The full music video for the title track "Love Paint" was released on August 29, 2016. "Daybreak" was released as a digital single on October 6, 2016 along with a music video.

== Composition ==
Canvas is a continuation of the narrative that began with the extended play Q is released earlier in 2016, with the sentences "Winter is gone", "But still missing", and "Waiting Q" appearing in the teaser video. The album was made on the concept of "24 hours in a day", where each track of the song corresponds to a specific time in the day.

"Daybreak", a duet between Minhyun and JR, is a medium-tempo soul R&B song mixed with a jazz groove representing the dawn and was written to give both "sad and hopeful feelings" at the same time. Minhyun and JR both wrote the lyrics during the dawn.

"R.L.T.L." represents morning, with bird chirps in the intro. "Thank You" was written as a message of gratitude to NU'EST's fans, and "Look" is a fast-tempo song conveying the "lively and active feeling of the night."

The title track for Canvas, "Love Paint", was produced by Mafly and Bumzu, fusing future bass and R&B with a classical orchestra sound. The song represents the afternoon.

== Commercial performance ==
Canvas debuted at #3 at Gaon Weekly Music Chart and #12 at Gaon Social Chart. Initial album sales were poor upon release, selling only 6,359 copies. Following NU'EST's appearance on Produce 101 Season 2, Canvas re-entered the Gaon Weekly Music Chart at #54 with the group's other four albums. By September 2017, the album had sold an additional 19,742 copies.

The album also peaked at #12 on the US Billboard World Albums Chart.

== Track listing ==
No.	Title	Lyrics	Music	Arrangement	Length
1.	"Daybreak" (Minhyun & JR)	Minhyun; JR; Kiggen	Kiggen; Choi Jin-kyung	Kiggen; Choi Jin-kyung	3:41
2.	"R.L.T.L (Real Love True Love) (One Morning)"	Baekho; Minhyun; JR; Bumzu	Bumzu; Park Gi-tae	Park Gi-tae; Bumzu	3:17
3.	"Love Paint (Every Afternoon)"	Baekho; Minhyun; JR; Ren; Aron; Bumzu	Bumzu; Royal Dive	Royal Dive 220	3:05
4.	"Thank You (Evening by Evening)"	Minhyun; Bumzu; Cho Ja-young	Minhyun; Bumzu; Cho Ja-young	Minhyun; Bumzu; Cho Ja-young	3:05
5.	"Look (A Starlight Night)"	Baekho; Minhyun; JR; Bumzu	Bumzu; Royal Dive	Royal Dive 220	4:00
Total length:					17:08

== Charts and sales ==
=== Album chart ===
Chart (2016)	Peak position
South Korea Gaon Weekly Album Chart	12
South Korea Gaon Monthly Album Chart	22
US Billboard World Albums Chart	12

=== Sales ===
Chart	Sales
Gaon physical sales	11,563+
