= Their Distance =

2016 Japanese independent film

- Theatrical release poster
- Kanji: 知らない、ふたり
- Revised Hepburn: Shiranai, Futari
- Directed by: Rikiya Imaizumi
- Written by: Rikiya Imaizumi
- Produced by: Yoshi Kino; Yan Sonju
- Starring: Ren; Fumiko Aoyagi; Minhyun; Hanae Kan; JR; Haruka Kinami; Tateto Serizawa
- Cinematography: Hiroshi Iwanaga
- Edited by: Rikiya Imaizumi
- Music by: alp
- Production companies: Nikkatsu; So-Net Entertainment; Ariola Japan
- Distributed by: Camden; Nikkatsu
- Release dates: October 23, 2015 (Tokyo); January 9, 2016 (Japan)
- Running time: 106 minutes
- Country: Japan
- Languages: Japanese; Korean

Their Distance (Japanese: 知らない、ふたり, Hepburn: Shiranai, Futari; lit. "Two Strangers"), is a 2015 Japanese independent film written, edited, and directed by Rikiya Imaizumi, featuring the South Korean boy band NU'EST in their Japanese film debut. Their Distance stars Ren, Fumiko Aoyagi, Minhyun, Hanae Kan, JR, Haruka Kinami, and Tateto Serizawa. The plot is centered around different ideas of love, from generational to cultural, told in a nonlinear narrative switching from various days in April to illustrate the perspectives of all the characters. Part of the film is in spoken Korean, with the film using actors who were fluent in Korean.

The film was first screened at the 28th Tokyo International Film Festival on October 23, 2015, before being released to the general public on January 9, 2016.

== Plot ==
Kim Leon is a quiet apprentice working at a custom shoe shop in Japan. Two years ago, he ran a red light on his bicycle, causing Mikio Arakawa to get hit by a car and be permanently paralyzed below his waist. Overcome with guilt, Leon becomes withdrawn and does not notice that his co-worker, Akiko Kokaze, is in love with him. On April 2, college student Yoo Ji-woo confesses to his Japanese teacher, Kanako Koda, that he is in love with both her and his girlfriend, Han Suna. On April 3, Ji-woo tells Suna, who gets drunk to cope with the shock. Leon finds her on the morning of April 4 sleeping on his favorite park bench. As Suna leaves, she breaks the heel off her shoe, and her co-worker and friend, Nam Sang-soo, takes her shoes for repair.

Captivated by Suna, Leon recognizes her shoes, and on April 5, he begins secretly following her home after her shift ends to make sure she arrives safely. Meanwhile, Sang-soo, who has fallen in love with Kokaze, asks Kanako to translate a love letter he is writing to her. As Kanako does so, Arakawa suggests that they separate, as he and her parents feel that his injury is burdening her. On April 6, Sang-soo picks up the repaired shoes, and, suspicious of Leon's sudden change in behavior, Kokaze begins following him in secret. On April 8, Sang-soo finishes writing his letter and gives it to Kokaze on April 9.

While Ji-woo sorts out his confused feelings with Kanako, he also encourages her to make up with Arakawa. Suna begins looking for the park where she met Leon and admits to Sang-soo later that night that she hopes to meet him again. She drunkenly kisses him when he takes her home, and after he leaves, she continues to describe her feelings to Leon himself, mistaking him for Sang-soo. When Leon confides in her his guilt towards Arakawa's accident, believing he doesn't deserve to be happy, Suna encourages him to move forward. After their conversation, Leon stops following her home.

On April 13, Kokaze turns down Sang-soo's confession because of her feelings for Leon. She and Sang-soo piece together that Leon is attracted to Suna, but Sang-soo believes that he has stopped following her because he had seen them kiss. Unaware that the person Suna is looking for is Leon, Kokaze suggests helping her, believing that Suna being inevitably rejected will allow Leon the chance to pursue her. On April 16, Kokaze and Sang-soo help Suna look for the park to no avail, to which Suna concludes that she may never see Leon again. In the evening, she confronts Ji-woo about her newfound feelings for Leon and suggests breaking up, hoping to confirm he still cares for her.

Kanako and Arakawa reconcile and decide to get married. They visit the shoe shop on April 17 to buy Kanako a new pair of shoes. Leon is overcome with relief that Kanako and Arakawa are still happily in love and have forgiven him. At the same time, Suna and Ji-woo make up and decide to stay together. Recalling Suna's advice from earlier, Leon finally reveals himself to personally thank her. When he returns to the shoe shop, he tells Kokaze that he's changed because he fell in love.

== Cast ==
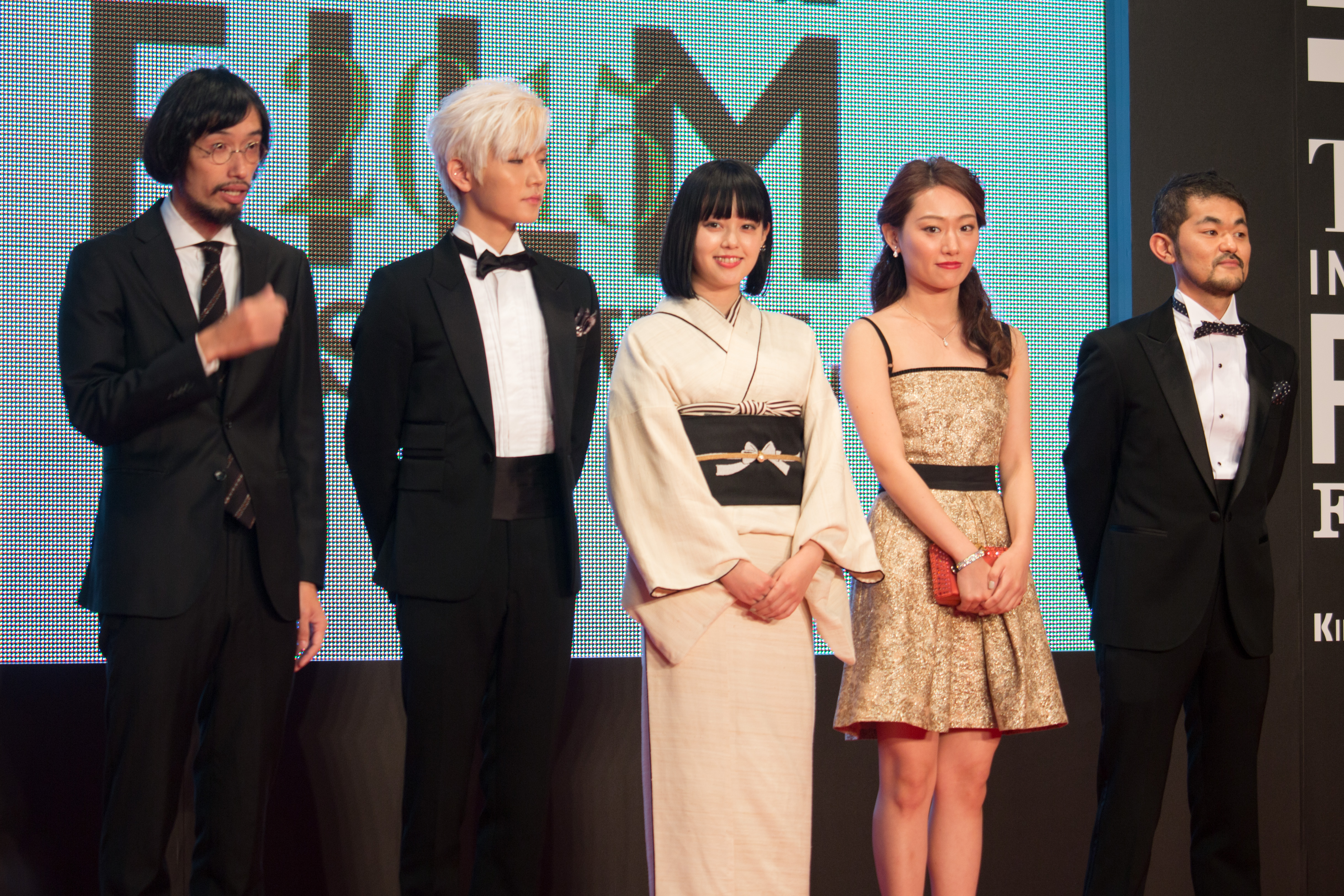
Cast and crew members for the film at the opening ceremony of the 28th Tokyo International Film Festival

- Ren as Kim Leon (キム・レオン), a Korean apprentice working at a custom shoe shop
- Fumiko Aoyagi as Akiko Kokaze (小風秋子), Leon's co-worker who is in love with him
- Minhyun as Nam Sang-soo (ナム・サンス), a Korean convenience store employee and college student who falls in love with Kokaze
- Hanae Kan as Han Suna (ハン・ソナ), a Korean convenience store employee to whom Leon becomes attracted
- JR as Yoo Ji-woo (ユ・ジウ), Suna's boyfriend who is also in love with Kanako
- Haruka Kinami as Kanako Koda (幸田加奈子), a Japanese teacher
- Tateto Serizawa as Mikio Arakawa (荒川巳喜男), Kanako's wheelchair-using boyfriend and a victim of a car accident Leon caused
- Aron as Ji-woo's friend
- Baekho as Ji-woo's friend

== Production ==
Filming for Their Distance took place in April 2015.

Their Distance premiered at the 28th Tokyo International Film Festival on October 23, 2015. The film was later released to the public on January 9, 2016. Their Distance also competed for the Nippon Cinema Award at the 16th Japanese Film Festival Nippon Connection. The theme song for the film is "Cherry" by NU'EST.

On March 14, 2016, Nikkatsu released Their Distance internationally in 200 countries with English, French, Portuguese, and Spanish subtitles on iTunes, Google Play, YouTube, and Vimeo.

The film was screened in South Korean theaters on September 14, 2017. Upon its release, the official trailer gained 1 million views in three days.

== Reception ==
Mark Schilling from The Japan Times gave Their Distance three out of five stars, praising Serizawa and Kinami's characters as the highest point in the film. Elizabeth Kerr from The Hollywood Reporter found the characters' relationships "manipulated", but praised Kinami's performance.
