= NU'EST W =

South Korean boy group

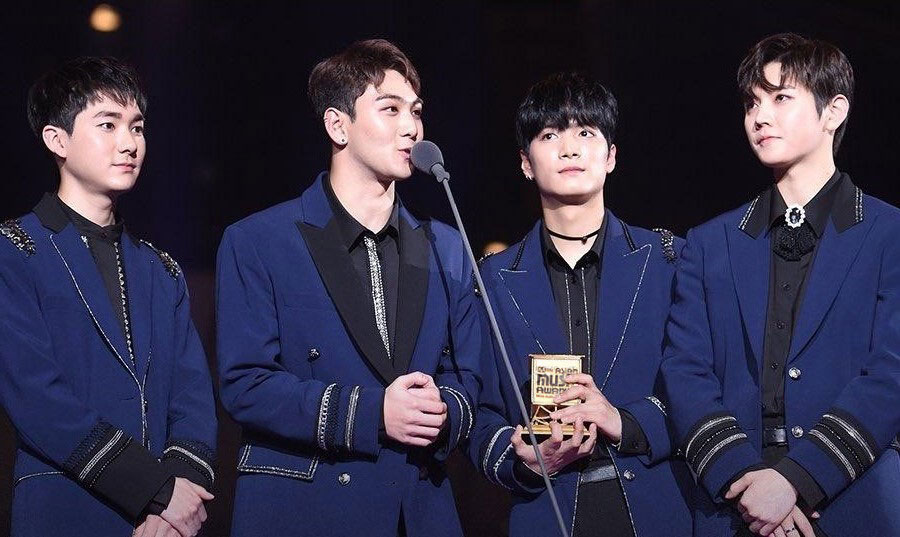
- NU'EST W at MAMA 2017 in Japan; From left to right: Aron, Baekho, JR, and Ren

Background information
- Origin: Seoul, South Korea
- Genres: K-pop; dance-pop; R&B
- Years active: 2017–2018
- Label: Pledis
- Spinoff of: NU'EST
- Past members: JR; Aron; Baekho; Ren

NU'EST W was the second sub-unit of South Korean boy band NU'EST. The group consisted of NU'EST members: JR, Aron, Baekho, and Ren, promoting in the absence of Minhyun, who at the time was promoting with Wanna One. The group disbanded following the return of Minhyun on December 31, 2018.

== History ==
=== Predebut: Produce 101 Season 2 ===
For the first half of 2017, NU'EST members JR, Baekho, Ren, and Minhyun, participated in Produce 101 Season 2. Minhyun placed 9th, thus resulting in his debut in the winning group, Wanna One. Due to his absence, NU'EST promoted as a four-member special unit, NU'EST W, until Minhyun returned. The "W" stands for "wait", meaning that the group will wait for Minhyun to return. (Note: Excerpt: ‘W’는 ‘기다리다’라는 뜻을 가진 영문 ‘Wait’에서 따온 것이다. 멤버 민현을 기다리고, 뉴이스트를 기다려준 팬들을 위한 뉴이스트 W 유닛 활동으로 JR, 아론, 백호, 렌 총 4명 멤버가 어떤 새로운 모습을 선보일지에 대한 귀추 또한 주목된다.) It also contains a second meaning of them having waited a long time to greet fans again following periods of inactivity.

=== 2017: Debut ===
NU'EST W released their debut EP W, Here with the lead single "Where You At" on 10 October 2017. The EP was well received, and they earned their first music show win with "Where You At" on 19 October 2017 on M! Countdown. The following day, NU'EST W won first place on Music Bank. Since its release, sales of W, Here have surpassed 200,000 copies, making NU'EST W the fourth K-pop group to reach 200,000 copies sold in one week, and the only unit group to do so. In October 2017, NU'EST W became models for the outdoor clothing company BLACKYAK's campaign, "Art of the Youth".

On 23 December 2017, NU'EST W contributed to the soundtrack of A Korean Odyssey with "Let Me Out", which is their first Korean drama song since their debut.

=== 2018: Who, You, Wake, N, and disbandment ===
In anticipation of the release of the album Who, You, Pledis Entertainment launched a one-day ad campaign for NU'EST W in New York City's Times Square to both promote the upcoming album and thank fans. On 25 June 2018, NU'EST W released their second EP, Who, You, and began promoting the lead single titled "Dejavu". Following its release, "Dejavu" topped three major Korean music charts. They first performed "Dejavu" at their album showcase on 25 June 2018.

On August 26, 2018, NU'EST W released an OST entitled "AND I" for the historical romance drama Mr. Sunshine. The "AND I" OST achieved #1 on Mnet, Naver Music & Soribada charts. On October 1, 2018, NU'EST W and NC Soft's character brand, Spoonz , released a collaboration song called "I Don't Care." NU'EST W together with their labelmate Seventeen became brand ambassadors of a fried chicken restaurant franchise Nene Chicken.

On November 8, Gaon Chart announced that EP Who, You received the official platinum certification. Receiving a platinum certification means that the album reached 250,000 sales.

On November 26, NU'EST W released their final EP as a unit group Wake, N with the title song "Help Me". "Help Me" topped domestic music charts including Naver and Soribada. They earned their first win for "Help Me" on Music Bank on December 7. The group disbanded following Minhyun's return from Wanna One.

== Discography ==
=== Extended plays ===
List of extended plays, with selected details, chart positions, sales, and certifications
Title	Album details	Peak chart positions		Sales	Certifications
Title	Album details	KOR	US World	Sales	Certifications
W, Here	Released: October 10, 2017; Label: Pledis Entertainment; Formats: CD, digital download	1	5	KOR: 308,108+	
Who, You	Released: June 25, 2018; Label: Pledis Entertainment; Formats: CD, digital download	1	9	KOR: 250,810+	KMCA: Platinum
Wake, N	Released: November 26, 2018; Label: Pledis Entertainment; Formats: CD, digital download	1	—	KOR: 212,345+	
"—" denotes releases that did not chart or were not released in that region.

=== Singles ===
List of singles, with selected chart positions, showing year released and album name
Title	Year	Peak chart positions			Sales	Album
Title	Year	KOR	KOR Hot.	US World	Sales	Album
"If You" (있다면)	2017	2	49	23	KOR: 417,127+	Non-album single
"Where You At"	2017	1	2	—	KOR: 321,931+	W, Here
"Dejavu"	2018	5	2	—	—N/a	Who, You
"Help Me"	2018	9	3	—	—N/a	Wake, N
"—" denotes releases that did not chart or were not released in that region.

=== Other charted songs ===
Title	Year	Peak chart position		Sales	Album
Title	Year	KOR	Hot	Sales	Album
"My Beautiful"	2017	19	7	KOR: 89,856+	W, Here
"Paradise" (Ren solo)	2017	38	12	KOR: 39,115+	W, Here
"Good Love" (Aron solo)	2017	40	13	KOR: 38,300+	W, Here
"With" (JR solo)	2017	33	11	KOR: 41,395+	W, Here
"지금까지 행복했어요" lit. Thankful for You (Baekho solo)	2017	25	9	KOR: 74,042+	W, Here
"Polaris"	2018	67	6		Who, You
"Signal"	2018	85	8		Who, You
"YlenoL"	2018	92	9		Who, You
"Gravity&Moon" (중력달)	2018	93	10		Who, You
"Shadow"	2018	94	11		Who, You

=== Soundtrack appearances ===
Title	Year	Peak chart positions	Album
Title	Year	KOR	Album
"Let Me Out"	2017	95	A Korean Odyssey OST Part.1
"And I"	2018	64	Mr. Sunshine OST Part.10

== Concerts and tours ==
=== Fanmeeting ===
==== 2017 NU'EST W FANMEETING 'L.O.Λ.E & DREAM' ====
Date	City	Country	Venue	Attendance
August 26, 2017	Seoul	South Korea	Korea University Gymnasium	10,000
August 27, 2017	Seoul	South Korea	Korea University Gymnasium	10,000

=== Concert Tour ===
==== Special Mini Concert 2017 ====
Date	Country	Venue	Attendance
October 10, 2017	Taiwan	Taiwan Sports Center	3,000
November 18, 2017	Hong Kong	Star Hall	3,000

==== Double You ====
Date	City	Country	Venue	Attendance
March 16, 2018	Seoul	South Korea	SK Olympic Handball Gymnasium	16,000
March 17, 2018	Seoul	South Korea	SK Olympic Handball Gymnasium	16,000
March 18, 2018	Seoul	South Korea	SK Olympic Handball Gymnasium	16,000
April 28, 2018	Bangkok	Thailand	Thunder Dome	—N/a
May 12, 2018	Jakarta	Indonesia	The Kasablanka Hall	—N/a
May 26, 2018	Taipei	Taiwan	New Taipei City Exhibition Hall	—N/a
September 23, 2018	Hong Kong		Star Hall	—N/a
October 27, 2018	Bangkok	Thailand	Thunder Dome	—N/a
December 15, 2018	Seoul	South Korea	Jamsil Indoor Stadium	14,000
December 16, 2018	Seoul	South Korea	Jamsil Indoor Stadium	14,000
