= Ren (South Korean singer) =

South Korean singer and actor (born 1995)

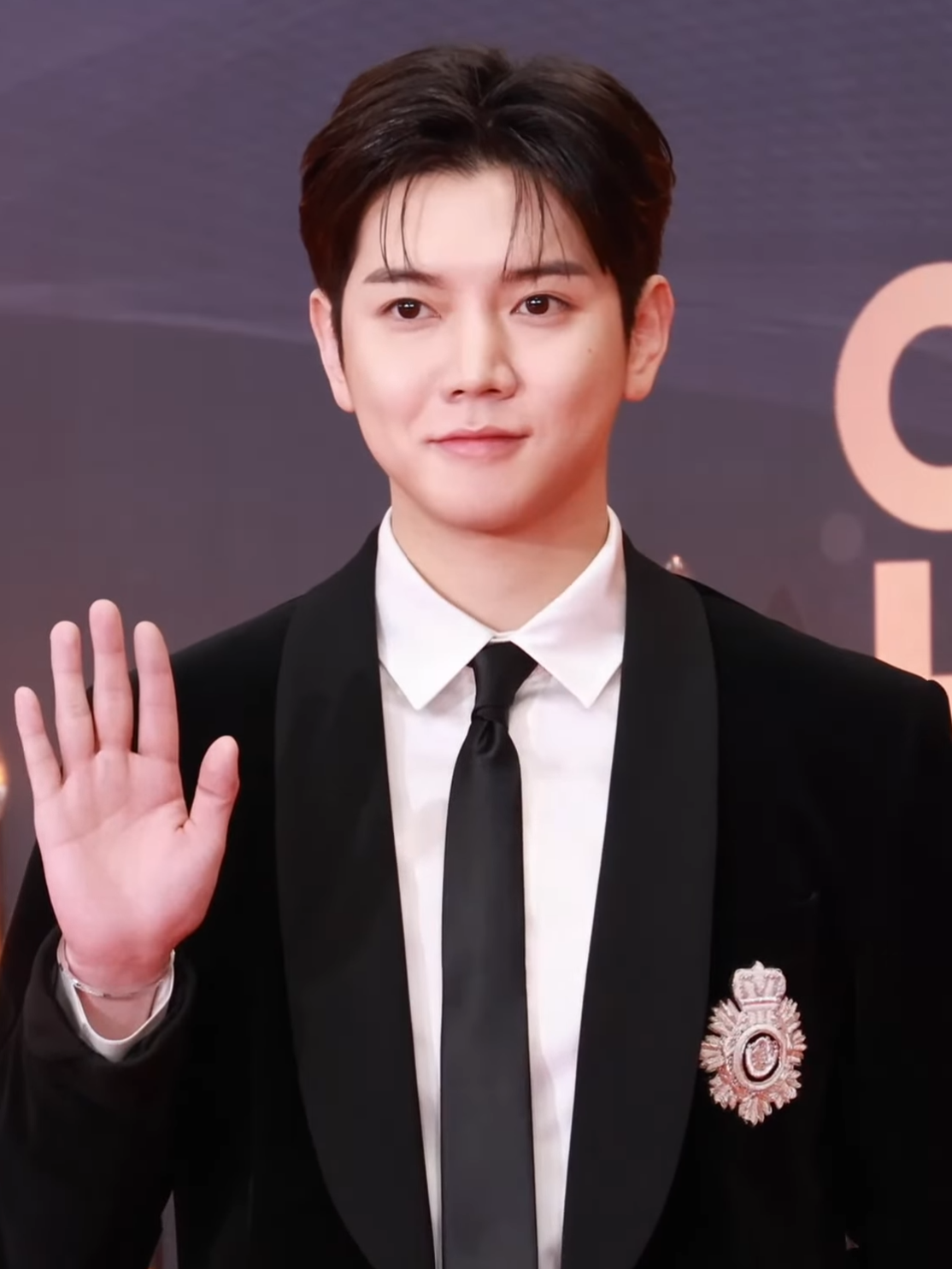
- Ren in December 2023
- Born: Choi Min-gi; November 3, 1995 (age 30); Busan, South Korea
- Education: Hanyang University Institute for Future Talents
- Occupations: Singer; actor; television personality
- Musical career
- Genres: K-pop
- Years active: 2012–present
- Labels: Pledis; BPM
- Formerly of: NU'EST; NU'EST W

Korean name
- Hangul: 최민기
- Hanja: 崔珉起
- RR: Choe Mingi
- MR: Ch'oe Min'gi

Signature
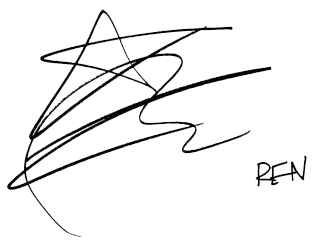

Choi Min-gi (Korean: 최민기; born November 3, 1995), known professionally as Ren (렌), is a South Korean singer, actor and television personality. He began his professional career in 2012 as a vocalist of the South Korean boy group NU'EST. Following his contract's expiration in Pledis Entertainment in March 2022, Choi established his career as a solo artist signed under BPM Entertainment.

== Career ==
=== Pre-debut ===
Ren was accepted into Pledis Entertainment after auditioning in 2010. Prior to debuting, Ren appeared as a back-up dancer in After School Blue's "Wonder Boy" in 2011. He participated in Pledis Entertainment's Christmas single "Love Letter" and was also featured in an alternate music video for the song as a member of Pledis Boys. He performed with After School with the rest of Pledis male trainees, dubbed "After School Boys", at the SBS Gayo Daejeon.

=== 2012–2022: NU'EST ===
Ren debuted as a sub-vocalist of NU'EST in 2012. Within a month of debuting, he modelled for Park Yoon-so during the Fall/Winter Seoul Fashion Week, and his androgynous styling drew attention for breaking gender norms.

In 2013, Ren appeared in Jeon Woo-chi in a minor role. In 2015, he starred in the main role of Japanese film Their Distance alongside NU'EST members. In 2016, Ren appeared in the NAVER TV web-series I'm Not a Girl Anymore in a guest role.

In 2017, alongside bandmates JR, Baekho and Minhyun, Ren competed on Produce 101 Season 2 under his birth name for a chance to debut in project group Wanna One. He was eliminated in the finale with a final rank of #20. Following the show's conclusion, he and the remaining NU'EST members promoted as the sub-group NU'EST W from 2017 to 2018. During the group's activity, he wrote the lyrics for his solo songs, "Paradise" and "You & I." At the same time, Ren became a fixed panellist on the talk show Learning the Hard Way. He was also cast in a starring role on the drama Four Sons, but the show's production was briefly suspended in 2018 with only four of sixteen episodes filmed.

In 2018, Ren became a regular cast member on The Kkondae Live. In 2019, he became a regular cast member on Hogu Chart.

From 2020 to 2021, Ren hosted the radio show "To.Night" on Naver NOW with bandmate Aron.

Ren began his musical theatre career in 2020, starring in the lead role of Everybody's Talking About Jamie as Jamie, a schoolboy aspiring to be a drag queen. Following on exceptional reception and praise for his 'overflowing talent' and 'unrivalled stage presence' in his debut work that 'heralded the birth of a new musical star', Ren was cast in the next year in rock musical Hedwig and the Angry Inch as titular genderqueer singer Hedwig. He remains the only active idol to have been cast as Hedwig over all Korean renditions of the musical, and have spoken on his 'raw yet youthful' charm in his approach to the character. Ren has been critically acclaimed for these two characters, and has been lauded as the one 'at the forefront of third-generation idol musicals', with emphasis on his choices to portray unconventional and high-skill level roles.

NU'EST's exclusive contract with Pledis Entertainment expired on March 14, 2022, and Ren (alongside members Aron and JR) left the agency, therefore concluding their 10-year career as a group.

=== 2022–present: Launch of solo career ===
In May 2022, Ren signed with BPM Entertainment as a solo artist. In the same month, Ren also joined the platform Universe. Upon moving agencies, he was immediately cast in the musical Bungee Jumping Of Their Own as second male lead Lim Hyun-bin.

In September 2022, it was confirmed by his agency that Ren would hold fan-concerts "The Day After" in Korea and Japan in early November.

In November 2022, Ren was cast as murder suspect Oh Jin-woo in ENA mystery-thriller drama Longing for You, his first recurring role in a TV drama. In addition, Ren continued his musical theatre career by appearing in The Three Musketeers musical as D'artagnan for two consecutive seasons (2022 to 2023).

From November 2022 to February 2023, Ren held his first solo fan-concerts since 2019, bringing "The Day After" to Seoul, Japan and Hong Kong. In March 2023, Ren competed in King of Mask Singer as 'Disco Pang Pang', reaching the second round.

On June 15, 2023, Ren made his solo debut with the EP Ren'dezvous, headed by its lead single "Ready to Move". Following music show promotions, he embarked on a mini fan-concert tour with "Ren'dezvous" in Seoul, Japan and Hong Kong.

Ren turned his focus on acting in the latter half of the year. He was cast in November as the male lead in musical Winter Wanderer. Ren also took part in his first Joseon-era drama special in Shadow Confession. His portrayal of sickly noble son Yunho earned him his first acting award nomination at the 2023 KBS Drama Awards.

== Philanthropy ==
On April 18, 2018, Ren hand-delivered two piggy banks to the Korea Pediatric Cancer Foundation to support the latter's "Creating My Own Angel Contest" campaign. The following year, he and bandmate Minhyun brought the children of the foundation to NU'EST's 2019 LOVE Page Fan Meeting in Seoul. In December of the same year, Ren donated all the proceeds of his self-published fairy tale book 함께라서 행복한 우리들 (lit. We're Happy Because We're Together) to the foundation.

== Discography ==
=== Extended plays ===
List of extended plays, showing selected details and chart positions
Title	Details	Peak chart positions	Sales
Title	Details	KOR	Sales
Ren'dezvous	Released: June 13, 2023; Label: BPM Entertainment; Formats: CD, digital download; Track listing: 1. "Ready to Move"; 2. "Autofill"; 3. "Imagine More"; 4. "Lullaby (11:03); 5. "My Story"	11	KOR: 21,674

=== Singles ===
List of singles, showing year released, selected chart positions, and name of the album
Title	Year	Peak chart positions	Album
Title	Year	KOR Down.	Album
"Ready to Move"	2023	75	Ren'dezvous

== Filmography ==
=== Films ===
Year	Title	Role	Notes	Ref.
2015	Their Distance	Kim Leon	Japanese film	
2023	Shadow Confession	Yunho	Lead Role	
TBA	Asian Ghost Project	TBA	Lead role (Series)	

=== Television series ===
Year	Title	Role	Notes	Ref.
2013	Jeon Woo-chi	Kang-sul	Cameo (Episode 19, 21, 22)	
2013	Reckless Family 3	Himself	Cameo (Episode 29)	
2015	The Lonely Gourmet: Taipei	Shopkeeper	Guest Role (Episode 3)	
2016	I'm Not a Girl Anymore	Park Shi Woo	Cameo (Episode 6–7)	
2018	Something Family 2	Mali / Park Seong-min	Cameo (Episode 10–11)	
2018	Coffee Society 4.0	Jeongseok	Cameo (Episode 16)	
2023	Longing for You	Oh Jin-woo		

=== Television shows ===
Year	Title	Role	Notes	Ref.
2017	Produce 101 Season 2	Contestant		
2017	Learning the Hard Way	Panelist		
2018	Hidden Singer 5	Panelist	Episode 8 (with Aron and Baekho)	
2018	The Kkondae Live	Panelist		
2019	Makgeolli on the Rooftop	Guest	Episode 14 (with Baekho)	
2019	Hogu Chart	Panelist		
2022	Listen Up	Guest performer	Episode 4	
2023	King of Mask Singer	Contestant	Episodes 396-397	
2023	Star Eat Show	MC	Season 1	
2023	Music in the Trip	Guest	Episode 4	

=== Radio shows ===
Year	Title	Role	Ref.
2020–2021	To.Night	DJ (with Aron)	

== Musical theatre ==
Year	Title	Role	Ref.
2020	Everybody's Talking About Jamie	Jamie	
2021	Hedwig and the Angry Inch	Hedwig / Tommy	
2022	Bungee Jumping of Their Own	Im Hyun-bin	
2022	The Three Musketeers	D'artagnan	
2023	The Three Musketeers	D'artagnan	
2023	Winter Wanderer	Han Min-woo	

== Awards and nominations ==
Name of the award ceremony, year presented, category, nominee of the award, and the result of the nomination
Award ceremony	Year	Category	Nominee/Work	Result	Ref.
KBS Drama Awards	2023	Best Actor in Drama Special/TV Cinema	Shadow Confession	Nominated	
