= Sleep Talking (EP) =

EP by NU'EST
- Released: August 22, 2013
- Length: 21:59
- Label: Pledis Entertainment; LOEN Entertainment
- Producer: Duble Sidekick; Iggy; Seo Yong Bae; Lee Yoo Jin; Moon Gihwan

NU'EST chronology
Hello (2013)	Sleep Talking (2013)	Re:Birth (2014)

Singles from Sleep Talking
- 1. "Sleep Talking" Released: August 22, 2013

Music video
- "Sleep Talking'" on YouTube

Sleep Talking is the third Korean extended play by South Korean boy group NU'EST. It was released on August 22, 2013, by Pledis Entertainment and distributed by LOEN Entertainment.

The EP was a commercial success peaking at number 8 on the Gaon Album Chart. The EP has sold over 13,825 physical copies as of December 2013.

== Background ==
On July 31, 2013, Ren posted a picture of himself on Twitter in the recording booth and wrote, "By. REN. Final recording! Not long till our comeback guys!!!" Then on August 5, Pledis Entertainment confirmed that Nu'est was working with Duble Sidekick for their new comeback. Finally, on August 8, Nu'est announced their comeback date as August 22, 2013 and reported that it was a mini album. Along with that, they released teaser photos of Ren and JR. They also released Baekho, Minhyun, and Aron's teaser photo later on and announced that they would be introducing a new genre of music called "mystic fantasy".

== Release ==
On August 15, 2013, Nu'est released the intro rap video for their upcoming comeback. In the video, it had both JR and Aron in the recording booth saying their lines. On August 19, they released the teaser for their upcoming comeback Sleep Talk onto their official YouTube channel. Then on the 22nd they followed up with the release of their title song 'Sleep Talking' and announced their showcase for their new EP.

== Commercial performance ==
Sleep Talking entered at number 8 on the Gaon Album Chart on the chart issue dated August 18–24, 2013. In its second week, the EP fell to number 14 and to number 18 in its third week. In its fourth week, the EP placed at number 50 and at number 97 in its fifth and final week.

The EP entered at number 15 on the chart for the month of August 2013, with 11,935 physical copies sold. In September the EP placed at number 45 with 1,414 copies. The EP charted at number 100 for the year 2013, with 13,825 copies sold.

In May 2017, the EP re-entered the chart, alongside other 4 albums from the group, at number 53 with 1,610 copies.

== Track listing ==
Digital download

No.	Title	Lyrics	Music	Arrangement	Length
1.	"Sleep Talking" (잠꼬대; jamkkodae)	Duble Sidekick; David Kim	Duble Sidekick	Duble Sidekick	3:28
2.	"Beautiful Ghost"	JR; Seo Ji-eum	Fredrik Hult; Jimmy Burney; Andreas Oberg; Sean Alexander	Fredrik Hult; Jimmy Burney; Andreas Oberg; Sean Alexander	4:06
3.	"Pretty" (예뻐; yeppeo; feat. Yoo Ara)	Iggy; Seo Yong Bae; JR	Iggy; Seo Yong Bae	Iggy; Seo Yong Bae	3:17
4.	"Fine Girl"	Han Joon	Lee Yoo-jin	Lee Yoo-jin	3:38
5.	"Love You More" (조금 더 사랑할게; jogeum deo salanghalge)	Moon Gihwan	Moon Gihwan	Moon Gihwan	4:02
6.	"Please Don't" (야하게 입지마; yahage ibjima)	Iggy; Seo Yong Bae; JR	Iggy; Seo Yong Bae	Iggy; Seo Yong Bae	3:28
Total length:					21:59

== Chart performance ==
=== Single chart ===
Chart	Peak position
Billboard Korea K-Pop Hot 100	59
Gaon Social Chart	6
Gaon Weekly singles chart	92

=== Album chart ===
Chart	Peak position
South Korea Gaon Weekly Album Chart	8
South Korea Gaon Yearly Album Chart	95

=== Sales ===
Chart	Sales
Gaon physical sales	11,935+

=== Music Show charts ===
Song	Peak chart position		
Song	KOR		
Song	Inkigayo Chart	M! Countdown Chart	Music Core Chart
"Sleep Talking"	21	22	34
