= Aron (singer) =

American singer (born 1993)

- 아론
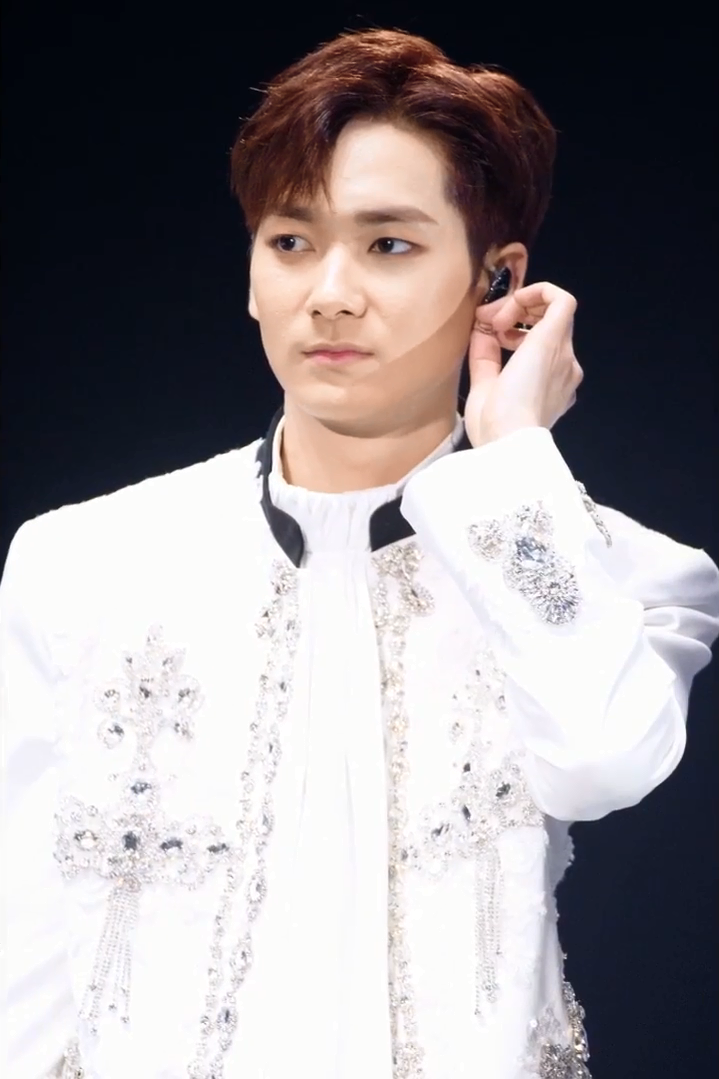
- Aron in July 2019
- Born: Aaron Kwak; May 21, 1993 (age 33); Los Angeles, California, United States
- Other name: Kwak Young-min
- Education: Loyola High School
- Occupations: Singer; rapper; media personality
- Musical career
- Genre: K-pop
- Years active: 2012–present
- Label: Pledis
- Formerly of: NU'EST; NU'EST W

Korean name
- Hangul: 곽영민
- Hanja: 郭英敏
- RR: Gwak Yeongmin
- MR: Kwak Yŏngmin

Signature
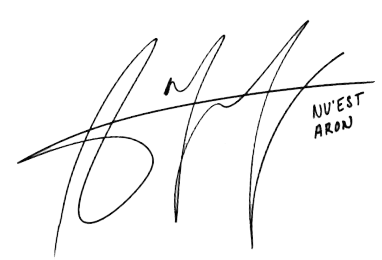

Aaron Kwak (born May 21, 1993), formerly known by the stage name Aron (Korean: 아론), is an American media personality, singer, and rapper based in South Korea. He began his professional career in 2012 as a main rapper of the South Korean boy group NU'EST. Following his contract's expiration with Pledis Entertainment in 2022, Aron established his solo career as a freelance radio and television host, appearing in various South Korean programs.

== Early life ==
Aaron Kwak was born on May 21, 1993, in Los Angeles, California. He attended Loyola High School and was on the varsity golf team, earning the Rookie of the Year Award in 2008 from Daniel Murphy High School. He tested within the top 0.5% on the SATs with a score of 2180 out of 2400. Aron had been accepted into New York University and intended to major in journalism but ultimately did not attend after choosing to become a singer.

== Career ==
=== Pre-debut ===
While attending the LA Korean Festival in 2009, Aron was invited to take part in the Pledis USA Personal Auditions, where he performed "So Sick" by Ne-Yo and participated in a training boot camp in South Korea for 1–2 weeks. He subsequently signed with Pledis Entertainment. After finishing high school, he returned to South Korea and trained for nine months. Prior to debuting, Aron appeared as a back-up dancer in After School Blue's "Wonder Boy" in 2011. He participated in Pledis Entertainment's Christmas single "Love Letter" and was also featured in an alternate music video for the song as a member of Pledis Boys. He performed with After School with the rest of Pledis Boys, now dubbed "After School Boys", at the SBS Gayo Daejeon.

=== 2012–2022: NU'EST ===
Along with four other Pledis Boys, Aron debuted in the boy band NU'EST in 2012 as a sub-vocalist. From April 8, 2013, to April 19, 2015, he hosted Arirang Radio's Music Access radio program. In 2014, he was featured as a guest artist on the song "Got it Figured Out" by Chad Future. From August 14, 2015, to April 24, 2016, he hosted his own radio show, Aron's Hangout, on SBS PopAsia.

From 2017 to 2018, Aron promoted with the other NU'EST members as the sub-group NU'EST W in the absence of Minhyun, who was exclusively promoting with Wanna One at the time. During the group's activity, he wrote the lyrics for his solo songs, "Good Love" and "Wi-Fi." He was also featured as a guest artist on the song "Loop" by Raina.

From 2020 to 2021, Aron hosted the radio show "To.Night" on Naver NOW with bandmate Ren.

It was announced on February 28, 2022, that NU'EST's exclusive contract with Pledis Entertainment will expire on March 14, 2022, and that Aron (alongside members JR and Ren) will leave the agency, therefore concluding their 10-year career as a group.

=== 2022–present: solo activities ===
On March 21, 2022, Aron announced he was hosting a podcast titled Korean Cowboys with South Korean television personality Joel Lane.

In May 2022, Aron was introduced as a host for the second season of Real Korea 5, a lifestyle channel. Within the same month, Aron held his first solo fan meeting at the Yonsei University's Centennial Memorial Hall to celebrate his 30th birthday with the fans.

In July 2022, Aron became a co-host of the Arirang TV talk show After School Club.

In November 2022, Aron opened his private messaging service thru Wonderwall's "Fromm".

== Discography ==
=== As featured artist ===
Title	Year	Peak chart positions	Sales (DL)	Album
Title	Year	KOR	Sales (DL)	Album
"Got it Figured Out" (Chad Future feat. NU'EST's Aron)	2014	—	—	Chad Future: The First Mini Album
"Loop" (밥 영화 카페) (Raina feat. Aron of NU'EST)	2017	55	KOR: 33,454+	Loop
"—" denotes releases that did not chart.

== Filmography ==
=== Television shows ===
Year	Title	Role	Ref.
2022–present	After School Club	Host	

=== Radio shows ===
Year	Title	Role	Ref.
2013–2015	Music Access	DJ	
2015–2016	Aron's Hangout	DJ	
2020–2021	To.Night	DJ	

=== Web shows ===
Year	Title	Role	Notes	Ref.
2022-present	Korean Cowboys	Co-host	Podcast	

== Awards and nominations ==
Name of the award ceremony, year presented, category, nominee of the award, and the result of the nomination
Award ceremony	Year	Category	Nominee / Work	Result	Ref.
The Fact Music Awards	2018	Fan N Star Hall of Fame Award	Aron	Won	
