= Q is =

EP by NU'EST
- Released: February 17, 2016
- Genre: K-pop
- Length: 17:40
- Label: Pledis Entertainment

NU'EST chronology
Bridge the World (2015)	Q is (2016)	Canvas (2016)

Singles from Q is
- 1. "Overcome" Released: February 17, 2016

Q is is the fourth extended play by the South Korean boy band NU'EST. The album was released on February 17, 2016 and was distributed by LOEN Entertainment.

== Background and release ==
Q is is NU'EST's first Korean release in 1.5 years after the group put their Korean activities on hold to promote in Japan. The album was released on February 17, 2016 along with the music video for the title track, "Overcome." A dance version of the music video was released on February 22, 2016.

== Composition ==
The concept of Q is focuses on a narrative about a queen and a knight who wants to protect her. During the album's comeback showcase, JR explained that the queen represents the group's fans, known as "Love." In addition, Baekho revealed that the first letter of each song spelled out the word "Love", while the second "s" in "One Kis2" was intentionally spelled with the number "2" to form a heart.

The title track, "Overcome", is described as an addictive melody with lyrics describing the knight's desire to protect the girl he loves by singing a magic spell to make her forget about pain. Joshua Minsoo Kim from Billboard describes the song as beginning as a "sultry ballad" resembling "Promise" before abruptly shifting into a pre-chorus resembling "My Boo" and then a "dramatic chorus complete with post-dubstep wobbles", comparing the change of pace in the song to "an arduous journey to reassure their lover."

== Reception ==
Q is peaked at #5 on the Gaon Music Chart. Initially, the album only sold 8,988 copies upon release, but after NU'EST's appearance on Produce 101 Season 2 in 2017, the album re-entered the charts and sold an additional 18,544 copies.

Q is peaked at #11 on the US Billboard World Albums Chart. In Japan, it peaked at #1 on Tower Records' daily ranking.

== Track listing ==
No.	Title	Lyrics	Music	Length
1.	"Lost & Found" (나의 천국 lit. My Heaven)	JR; Baekho	Bumzu; Park Gi-tae; Lee Ki-young; Baekho	3:08
2.	"Overcome" (여왕의 기사 lit. The Queen's Knight)	Bumzu; JR; Maxx Song; Kim Eun-su; Mafly; Denis Seo	Bumzu; Maxx Song	3:13
3.	"VVith" (사실 말야 lit. In Fact)	Bumzu; Baekho; Minhyun; JR	Bumzu; Baekho	3:06
4.	"Emotion" (티격태격 lit. Bickering)	Bumzu; GDLO; JR	Bumzu; GDLO	4:00
5.	"One Kis2"	Zuwan; Lee Chang-geun; Premium Project 1	Zuwan; Lee Chang-geun; Premium Project 1	4:13
Total length:				17:40

== Charts ==
Chart (2016)	Peak position
South Korea Gaon Music Chart	5
US Billboard World Albums Chart	11
