= Action (EP) =

EP by NU'EST
- Released: July 11, 2012
- Length: 14:07
- Label: Pledis Entertainment; LOEN Entertainment

NU'EST chronology
Action (2012)	Hello'' (2013)

Action is the first mini-album by South Korean boy group NU'EST. It was released on July 11, 2012, by Pledis Entertainment and distributed by LOEN Entertainment.

The EP was a commercial success peaking at number 4 on the Gaon Album Chart. The EP has sold over 20,770 hard copies as of December 2012.

== Background and release ==
On the 27th of June, 2012, it was announced that NU'EST will make a comeback in Mid-July with a new album. On July 1, the album jacket photo as well as the release date of their new mini-album was revealed. The teaser video for the title track Action was released on YouTube on July 5, and features the members in individually themed settings, with action-filled shots and heart-pounding music; this was followed by another teaser on July 8. The full music video was released on July 10, 2012.

== Promotion ==
The group made a comeback performance with their title track Action on Mnet's M Countdown at its July 12 episode. This was followed by a comeback performance on KBS Music Bank, MBC's Show! Music Core and SBS' Inkigayo.

On August 2, 2012, it was announced that the group would conclude promotions for Action and will continue with their third single, Not Over You. The full music video was released on August 12, 2012.

== Commercial performance ==
Action entered and peaked at number 4 on the Gaon Album Chart on the chart issue dated July 8–14, 2012. In its second week, the album fell to number 16 and to number 54 in its third week. In its fourth and final week the EP climbed to number 6.

The EP entered at number 8 on the chart for the month of July 2012, with 15,564 physical copies sold. The EP also charted at number 32 for the month of August with 2,649 copies and at number 100 for the month of September with 659 copies. The EP placed at number 73 for the year 2012, with 20,770 copies sold.

In May 2017, five years after its released, the EP re-enter the chart at number 52 with other 4 albums from the group.

== Track listing ==
No.	Title	Lyrics	Music	Length
1.	"Not Over You"	Brian Kim	Seo Jaeha, Lee Yujin	3:41
2.	"Action"	VASCO, Jang Jiwon	Seo Youngbae, Lee-Gi	3:18
3.	"Sandy"	WAERMO SAMUEL, Jang Jiwon	WAERMO SAMUEL, MUSOH	3:52
4.	"Happy Birthday (Baekho solo)"	Jeong Yeonseung	Jeong Yeonseung	3:16
Total length:				14:07

== Charts ==
=== Album chart ===
Chart	Peak position
South Korea Gaon Weekly Album Chart	4
South Korea Gaon Yearly Album Chart	73

=== Sales ===
Chart	Sales
Gaon physical sales	18,872+

=== Music Show charts ===
Song	Peak chart position	
Song	KOR	
Song	Music Bank K-Chart	M! Countdown Chart
"Action"	34	18

== Release history ==
Region	Date	Format	Labels
Korea	July 11, 2012	CD	Pledis Entertainment; LOEN Entertainment
Worldwide	July 11, 2012	Digital download	Pledis Entertainment; LOEN Entertainment
