= Re:Birth (NU'EST album) =

Re:BIRTH

Studio album by NU'EST
- Released: July 9, 2014
- Recorded: 2014
- Genre: Dance-pop
- Length: 33:20
- Label: Pledis Entertainment
- Producer: Han Sungsoo (executive)

NU'EST chronology
| Sleep Talking (2013) | Re:BIRTH (2014) | NU'EST BEST IN KOREA (2014) |

Singles from Re:BIRTH
- 1. "Good Bye Bye" Released: July 9, 2014

Re:BIRTH is the first Korean-language studio album by South Korean boy group NU'EST. It was released on July 9, 2014, by Pledis Entertainment.

The album was a commercial success peaking at number 5 on the Gaon Album Chart. The album has sold over 12,459 physical copies as of September 2014.

== Promotion ==
=== Live performances ===
The group made their first comeback performance on July 11, 2014 on KBS' Music Bank, followed by MBC's Music Core and SBS's Inkigayo on July 12, 2014 and July 13, 2014.

=== Single ===
"Good Bye Bye" was released as the title track in conjunction with the album on July 9, 2014.

== Commercial performance ==
Re:BIRTH entered and peaked at number 5 on the Gaon Album Chart on the chart issue dated July 6–12, 2014. In its second week, the album fell to number 14 and to number 42 in its third week. In its fourth and final week, the album climbed to number 36. The album entered at number 13 on the chart for the month of August 2014 with 11,105 physical copies sold. The album also charted at number 66 in August with 834 copies and at number 100 in September with 520 copies. The album sold 12,459 physical copies in 2014.

== Track listing ==
CD
| No. | Title | Lyrics | Music | Length |
|---|---|---|---|---|
| 1. | "Judgement" | Gilme | Keeproots, Fascinating | 0:56 |
| 2. | "Big Deal" | Gilme | Keeproots, Fascinating, Seo Jungjin | 3:37 |
| 3. | "Good Bye Bye" (굿 바이 바이) | Kye Bum Zu | Kim Taeseong, Cha Cha Malone, Casper | 3:27 |
| 4. | "Darkness" (사랑 없는 사랑) | JR, Kim Jihyang, Melodesign | Melodesign | 3:06 |
| 5. | "Storybook" | Kim Heesun | Ryan S. Jhun, Dwayne Shippy, Gregory Green, iDR | 3:43 |
| 6. | "Climax" | Iggy, Seo Youngbae, JR | Iggy, Seo Youngbae | 3:12 |
| 7. | "Give Me a Shoulder" (어깨빌려) | CliMXX, Aron, JR | CliMXX | 3:28 |
| 8. | "Face" | Jang Jiwon | Daniel Barkman | 3:40 |
| 9. | "Action" | VASCO, Jang Jiwon | Seo Youngbae, Lee-Gi | 3:14 |
| 10. | "Hello (여보세요)" | Son Ju Yeong | 시우, Kim Tae Hoon, Son Ju Yeong, Hyun Jae Wook | 3:29 |
| 11. | "Sleep Talking (잠꼬대)" | Duble Sidekick | Duble Sidekick, Ichiro Suezawa | 3:28 |

CD Only (Bonus Track)
| No. | Title | Length |
|---|---|---|
| 12. | "Hey, Love" | 3:49 |

== Charts ==
=== Album chart ===
| Chart | Peak position |
|---|---|
| Gaon Weekly album chart | 5 |
| Gaon Monthly album chart | 13 |

=== Sales and certifications ===
| Chart | Amount |
|---|---|
| Gaon physical sales | 11,105 |

=== Music Show charts ===
| Song | Peak chart position | |
| Song | KOR | |
| Song | Inkigayo Chart | M! Countdown Chart |
|---|---|---|
| "Good Bye Bye" | 25 | 14 |
