= Kim Jong-hyeon =

South Korean singer and actor (born 1995)

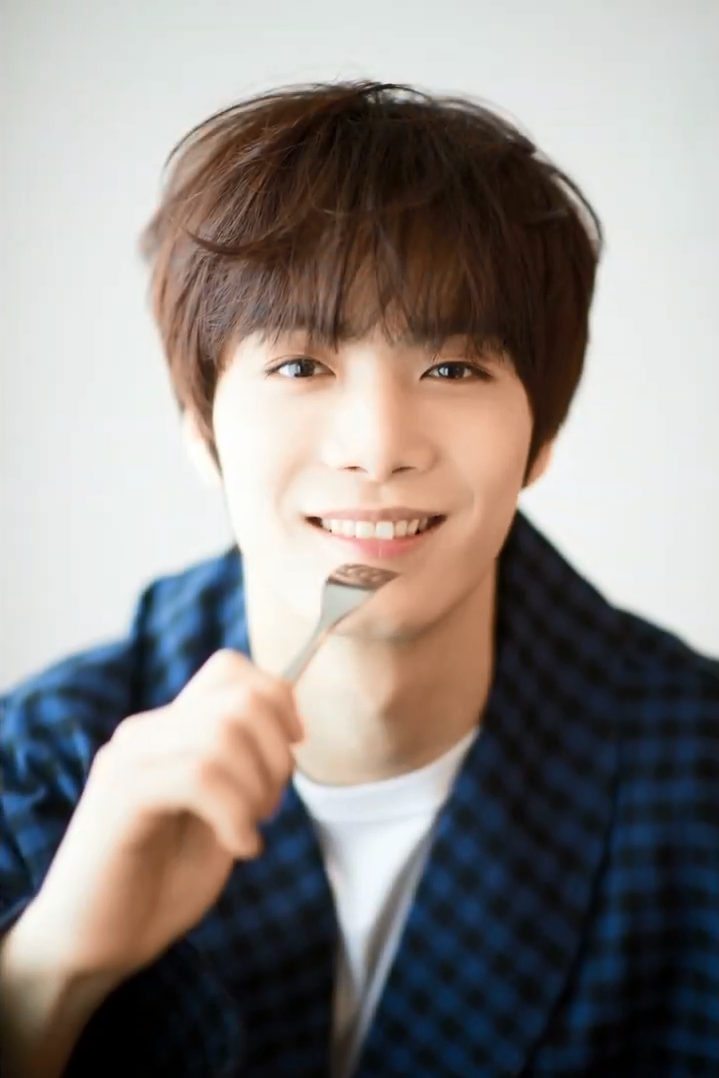
- Kim in 2019
- Born: Kim Jong-hyeon; June 8, 1995 (age 31); Gangneung, Gangwon, South Korea
- Other name: JR
- Education: Hanyang University Institute for Future Talents
- Occupations: Singer; rapper; dancer; actor
- Musical career
- Genres: K-pop; hip-hop; dance
- Instrument: Vocals
- Years active: 2012–present
- Labels: Pledis; Evermore
- Formerly of: NU'EST; NU'EST W

Korean name
- Hangul: 김종현
- Hanja: 金鍾炫
- RR: Gim Jonghyeon
- MR: Kim Chonghyŏn

Signature
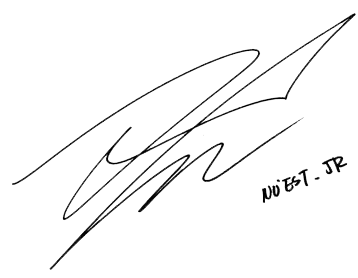

Kim Jong-hyeon (Korean: 김종현; born June 8, 1995), formerly known by his stage name JR, is a South Korean singer, rapper, dancer and actor. He is best known as the leader, main dancer and main rapper of South Korean boy group NU'EST. Following his contract expiration with Pledis Entertainment in 2022, Kim signed an exclusive contract as a soloist and actor under Evermore Entertainment, debuting with the release of his first extended play Meridiem on November 8, 2022.

== Career ==
=== Pre-debut ===
Jonghyeon was the first male trainee at Pledis Entertainment. He was a Pledis trainee for three years before debut. His first appearance was through Orange Caramel's "Bangkok City" music video, and was first introduced toward public in the show Hello Counselor by Kahi together with Baekho. He was featured in Uee's solo song "Sok Sok Sok". Jonghyeon also served as a back up dancer for After School Blue's "Wonder Boy" music video and live performances, together with NU'EST members and Seventeen's S.Coups. In December 2011, Kim and the other Pledis trainees dubbed as After School Boys performed together with After School on SBS Gayo Daejeon.

=== 2012–2022: NU'EST ===
On March 15, 2012, Kim debuted as the main rapper, main dancer and leader of the South Korean boy group NU'EST.

Kim participated in the reality television series Produce 101 Season 2 during the first half of 2017 and he ranked 14th. Following the conclusion of Produce 101 Season 2, Kim became a model for the cosmetics company Labiotte. He also joined the JTBC variety show Night Goblin as a fixed cast member and the tvN music show Shadow Singer as a panelist.

On June 27, 2018, Kim was confirmed as a member of Mnet's new romance reality show Love Catcher. He joined the celebrity-studded cast alongside four others, including Shin Dong-yup and Hong Seok-cheon.

In 2019 Kim became the brand ambassador of beauty brand Origins for South Korea. On April 13, 2020, he renewed his contract with the brand.

In April 2021 Kim was cast in the role of Lee Shin in the SBS musical drama Let Me Be Your Knight. On the same month, he became the main host of the Naver NOW audio show "Royal Comics".

It was announced on February 28, 2022, that NU'EST's exclusive contract with Pledis Entertainment will expire on March 14, 2022, and Kim (alongside members Aron and Ren) will leave the agency, therefore concluding their 10-year career as a group.

=== 2022–present: Solo activities ===
In May 2022 Kim signed a contract with Evermore Entertainment as a solo artist and actor.

In June 2022 Kim held his first fan meeting, Hi! (하이!) on July 2, 2022, at the Jamsil Student Gymnasium. After the event, Kim also held hi-touch session with approximately 3,500 audience.

In September 2022 it was announced that Kim debuted with his first solo album. It was released on November 8. In October 2022, it was announced that Kim would release his first mini album "Meridiem" on November 8. On October 31, the agency announced that the album release schedule has been postponed. A new date will be announced at a later date due to the Seoul Halloween crowd crush event.

On December 28, 2023, Evermore announced that Kim would released his second EP Brilliant Seasons on January 3, 2024. In addition, he would also reveal the EP details and perform the tracks before its release during the "Sparkling Eternity" fan concert on December 29 to 30, 2023.

== Personal life ==
=== Military service ===
On August 18, 2024, Kim held a live broadcast announcing that he would have to fulfill his military mandatory service as an active duty soldier on September 23.

== Discography ==
=== Extended plays ===
List of extended plays, showing selected details, selected chart positions, and sales figures
Title	Details	Peak chart positions	Sales
Title	Details	KOR	Sales
Meridiem	Released: November 8, 2022; Label: Evermore Entertainment; Formats: CD, digital download, streaming; Track listing: 1. "Intro (Into the Light)"; 2. "Blaze"; 3. "Lights"; 4. "décalcomanie" (반가워) (feat. MRCH); 5. "Creator"; 6. "to.(&U)"	7	KOR: 46,500
Brilliant Seasons	Released: January 3, 2024; Label: Evermore Entertainment; Formats: CD, digital download, streaming	14	KOR: 25,318

=== Singles ===
List of singles, with selected chart positions, showing year released, sales, and album name
Title	Year	Peak chart positions	Sales	Album
Title	Year	KOR	Sales	Album
As lead artist
"Daybreak" (with Minhyun)	2016	91	KOR: 25,874	Canvas
"Lights"	2022	— (Note: "Lights" did not enter the Circle Digital Chart, but peaked at number 10 on the Circle Download Chart.)	—N/a	Meridiem
"Motto"	2024	— (Note: "Motto" did not enter the Circle Digital Chart, but peaked at number 10 on the Circle Download Chart.)	—N/a	Brilliant Seasons
As featured artist
"Ssok Ssok Ssok" (쏙쏙쏙) (Note: "Ssok Ssok Ssok" was released as a promotional single in collaboration with Le Coq Sportif Golf Korea.) (Uee featuring Jonghyeon)	2011	64	KOR: 240,196	Non-album promotional single
Soundtrack appearances
"Star"	2023	—	—N/a	Sound Candy OST Part 1
"—" denotes releases that did not chart or were not released in that region.

=== Other charted songs ===
List of other charted songs, with selected chart positions, showing year released, sales, and album name
Title	Year	Peak chart positions		Sales	Album
Title	Year	KOR		Sales	Album
Title	Year	Circle	Hot (Note: The Kpop Hot 100 was launched on August 25, 2011, and was discontinued on July 16, 2014. The chart was re-established on June 4, 2017, but was discontinued on April 30, 2022.)	Sales	Album
"With"	2017	33	11	KOR: 41,395	W, Here
"I Hate You"	2018	— (Note: "I Hate You" did not enter the Gaon Digital Chart, but peaked at number 33 on Gaon Download Chart.)	—	—N/a	Wake, N
"Doom Doom"	2021	— (Note: "Need It" did not enter the Gaon Digital Chart, but peaked at number 32 and 174 on Gaon Download Chart and Gaon BGM Chart, respectively.)	—	—N/a	Romanticize
"Summer Drive" (Yoon Ji-sung featuring Jonghyeon)	2022	— (Note: "Summer Drive" did not enter the Gaon Digital Chart, but peaked at number 140 on Gaon Download Chart.)	—	—N/a	Miro
"—" denotes a recording that did not chart or was not released in that region.

== Filmography ==
=== Film ===
Year	Title	Role	Notes	Ref.
2016	Their Distance	Ji-woo	Japanese film	

=== Television series ===
Year	Title	Role	Notes	Ref.
2015	Lonely Gourmet: Taipei	Zhang Huai Shan / Zhang Si Nan	Special appearance	
2021–2022	Let Me Be Your Knight	Lee Shin	Alongside Lee Jun-Young who played Yoon Tae-in	

=== Web series ===
Year	Title	Role	Ref.
2023	Sound Candy	Kang Hae-sung	
2023	It Was Spring	Kim Bom	
2024	My Friend's Graduation Ceremony	Kim Min-goo	

=== Television shows ===
Year	Title	Role	Notes	Ref.
2017	Produce 101 Season 2	Contestant	Finished at 14th place	
2017	Night Goblin	Cast member		
2017	Shadow Singer	Panelist		
2017	Master Key	Participant	Episode 4, 6, 8, 11, 13	
2018	Law of the Jungle in Patagonia	Cast member	Episode 302–305	
2018	Inkigayo	Special MC	Episode 943	
2018	For The First Time in My Life	Participant	Episode 9–12	
2018	M Countdown	Special MC	Episode 576	
2018	Looking for Trouble Season 2: Paradise	Cast member	12 episodes	
2018	Battle Trip	MC, Participant	Episode 98–99 (MC); 109 (participant)	
2018	Two Yoo Project: Sugar Man Season 2	Show Man	Episode 1	
2018	King of Mask Singer	Panelist	Episode 169–170	
2018	Happy Together Season 4	Special MC	Episode 559 / Season 4 Episode 2	
2018	Love Catcher	Panelist		
2018	LAN Life	MC		
2018	Not the Same Person You Used to Know	MC	Episode 1; 3–6	
2019	Inkigayo	Special MC	Episode 1001	
2019	UHSN	MC	9 episodes	
2020	We Play Season 2	Cast member		
2020	Stars' Top Recipe at Fun-Staurant	Special MC	Episode 30–33	
2020	Super Idol League Season 12	Cast member	6 episodes	
2021	There Is No House for Us in Seoul	Special MC	Episode 20–21, 25	
2022	Surfer Junior	Cast member		

=== Radio ===
Year	Title	Role	Notes
2021	Royal Comics	DJ / Host	April 15, 2021 – July 15, 2021

== Awards and nominations ==
Name of the award ceremony, year presented, category, nominee of the award, and the result of the nomination
Award ceremony	Year	Category	Nominee / Work	Result	Ref.
Korea First Brand Awards	2019	Male Idol Variety Star	Kim Jong-hyeon (JR)	Won	
The Fact Music Awards	2018	Fan N Star Hall of Fame Award	Kim Jong-hyeon (JR)	Won	
