= NU'EST =

South Korean boy band

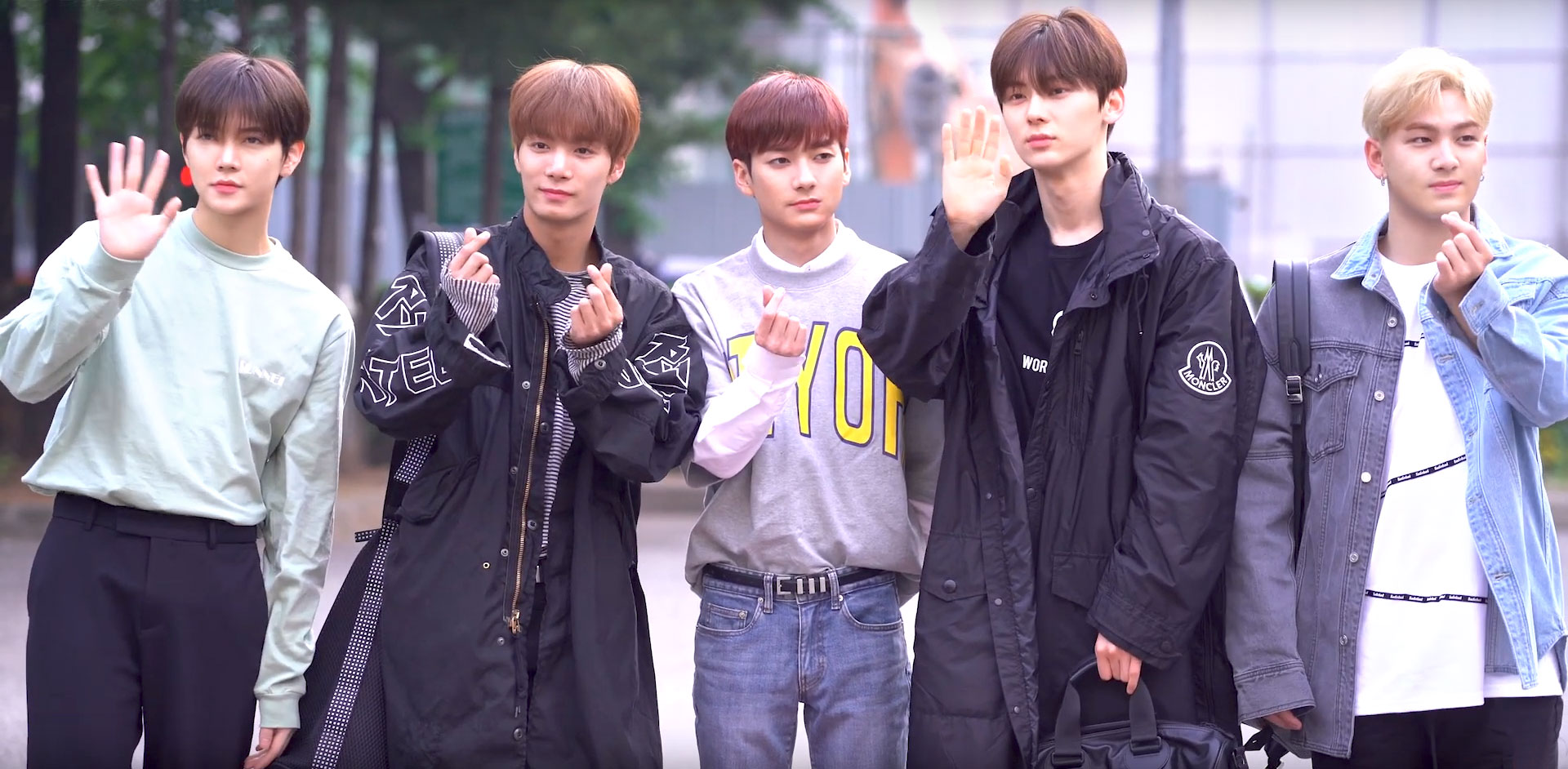
- NU'EST in May 2019; From left to right: Ren, JR, Aron, Minhyun, and Baekho

Background information
- Origin: Seoul, South Korea
- Genres: K-pop; urban; electropop; R&B
- Years active: 2012–2022
- Labels: Pledis; Ariola Japan; Warner Music Group
- Spinoffs: NU'EST-M; NU'EST W
- Past members: Aron; JR; Baekho; Minhyun; Ren
- Website: www.pledis.co.kr/ko/artist/detail/nuest

NU'EST (Korean: 뉴이스트; short for New Establish Style Tempo) was a South Korean boy band formed and managed by Pledis Entertainment. The group consisted of five members: JR, Aron, Baekho, Minhyun, and Ren. They debuted on March 15, 2012, with the single titled "Face". The group disbanded on March 15, 2022, after Aron, JR, and Ren left Pledis Entertainment upon the completion of their 10-year contract.

== History ==
=== Pre-debut ===
Prior to their debut, NU'EST made appearances in their labelmates' music releases. They were backup dancers for After School Blue's "Wonder Boy", and featured in their label's Christmas release "Love Letter". They also released their own music video for "Love Letter" as Pledis Boys. JR appeared in Orange Caramel's "Bangkok City" music video, and was also featured in Uee's solo song "Sok Sok Sok". Baekho appeared in After School's "Play Ur Love" music video, and Minhyun starred in Orange Caramel's "Shanghai Romance" music video.

JR, Minhyun, Aron, and Ren were also featured with After School's Lizzy in a commercial for New Balance. JR and Baekho appeared on the KBS television program Hello Counselor and were revealed by After School's Kahi as two members of the group. This drew attention from viewers and they became a topic of interest online. Pledis Boys, now dubbed "After School Boys", later performed with After School at the SBS Gayo Daejeon. Minhyun and Ren also gained attention modeling for designer Park Yoon-so's F/W 2012–13 Seoul Fashion Week show, titled 'Big Park'.

=== 2012–2014: Debut with Face, Action, Hello, Sleep Talking, Re:BIRTH and Japanese debut ===
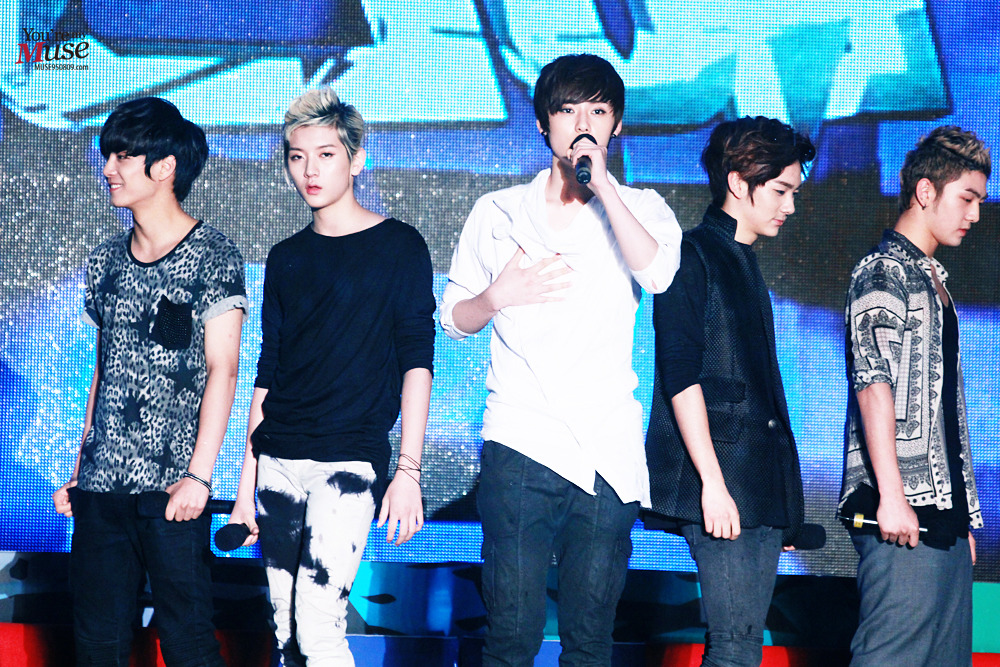
NU'EST in September 2012

NU'EST made their debut with their first single, "Face", on March 15, 2012. Their debut stage was on M! Countdown on the same day.

The group began airing their own reality show, Making of a Star: NU'EST Landing Operation, during the promotional period.

They returned with their first EP, Action, on July 11, and became ambassadors for Korea's Scout Association. During their promotional period and the rest of the year, NU'EST began to expand to the global market, holding events in Japan, Australia, other parts of Asia, and the United States, including performances at KCON. In December, NU'EST began endorsements with McDonald's.

Baekho and Ren made acting appearances in the drama Jeon Woo-chi alongside label mate Uee in January 2013. The group returned with their second EP, Hello, on February 13. They held their first exclusive concert, Show Time NU’EST Time, on the same day to commemorate the release. During the promotional period, they were cast for SBS MTV Diary along with their then-label mate Hello Venus. In March, NU'EST celebrated their first anniversary through a concert in Japan, NU′EST Debut 1st Anniversary Live Show Time. On April 8, Aron became a DJ for Arirang's Music Access.

On August 22, 2013, NU'EST released their third EP, Sleep Talking, with the lead single of the same name.

To celebrate Music Core's 400th episode in March 2014, Ren performed Girl's Day's "Something" alongside BtoB's Minhyuk, A-Jax's Seungjin, and VIXX's Hongbin.

On July 9, 2014, NU'EST released their first full album, Re:Birth, with the lead single "Good Bye Bye". They made their Japanese debut on November 5, with the single "Shalala Ring".

=== 2015–2016: Japanese promotions, Q Is and Canvas ===
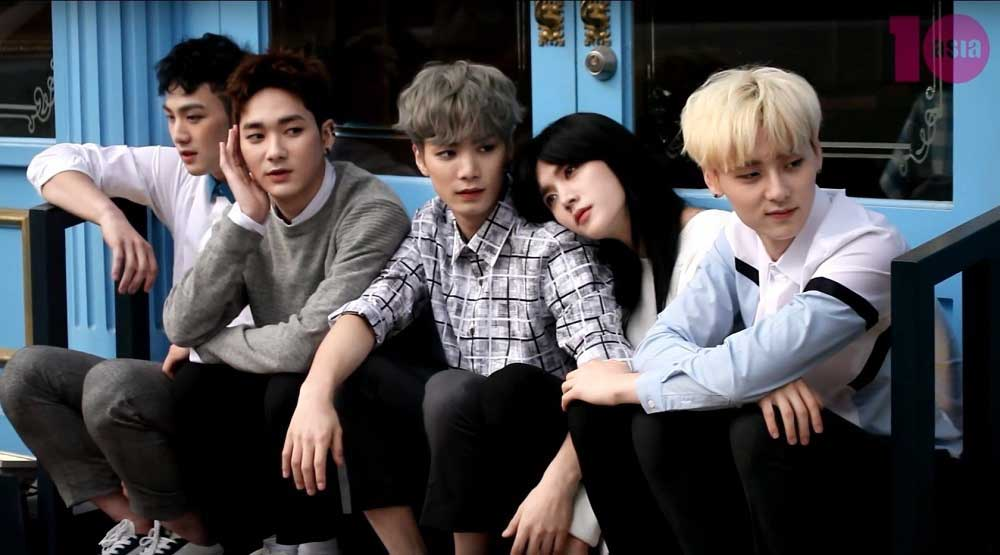
NU'EST in April 2016

NU'EST released the digital single "I'm Bad" on February 27, 2015, with a limited edition physical release on March 15 to celebrate their third anniversary. Baekho did not participate in the lead single as he was recovering from vocal cord polyps surgery, but he did contribute to the B-side track, "A Scene Without You." On April 2, Minhyun collaborated with Korean indie artist Fromm on the single "The Aftermath". On April 19, Aron ended his position as a DJ at Arirang's Music Access. The group held their first solo showcase in North America in Dallas, put together by My Music Taste, on third May.

NU'EST released their second Japanese single, "Nanananamida", on May 20. On August 14, Aron took up a position as a DJ on SBS PopAsia with his own show Aron's Hangout. NU'EST released their first Japanese studio album, Bridge the World, on November 18, after pre-releasing the tracks "Bridge the World", "Cherry", "Access to You", and "Ame Nochi Eien". "Cherry" was used as the theme song to the film Their Distance, which the members starred in as their Japanese film debut.

Their fourth EP, Q is, was released on February 17, 2016, with the lead single "Overcome". They began promotions for the album the following day. NU'EST released their fifth extended play Canvas and the accompanying single "Love Paint (Every Afternoon)" on August 29, 2016. After four years of promotions, the group received their first music show nomination on The Show. On October 6, 2016, the music video for "Daybreak", a duet between Minhyun and JR from Canvas, was released.

=== 2017–2018: Produce 101 Season 2 and NU'EST W ===
After the commercial decline of their previous releases and considerations of disbandment, JR, Baekho, Minhyun, and Ren participated in the reality television series Produce 101 Season 2 during the first half of 2017. During their appearance on the show, previously released albums, including Q Is and Canvas, rose on South Korean album charts, reflecting a sudden surge in popularity of the group.

After the final episode of Produce 101 Season 2 aired, NU'EST's previous releases shot back up on music charts and topped the Gaon Chart. Only Minhyun ranked within the top 11, earning a position in the temporary boy group Wanna One, and he promoted exclusively with them for 1.5 years. The remaining members announced they would be promoting as NU'EST W until Minhyun's return. Due to the group's sudden surge in popularity, they (as NU'EST W) returned to music shows to promote their single "Hello" (first released in 2013), and ranked number 11 on Inkigayo.

Following the conclusion of Produce 101 Season 2, JR and Ren also became models for the cosmetics company Labiotte. Subsequently, Baekho and Aron also joined their groupmates in promoting the brand. Ren joined the JTBC variety show Learning the Hard Way, of which he is a fixed member. Aron featured on Raina's single "Loop".

While Minhyun's Wanna One contract officially ended on December 31, 2018, he did not officially return to NU'EST until a month later. This was due to Pledis and Swing Entertainment coming to an agreement that allowed Minhyun to attend scheduled year-end shows and award ceremonies throughout January 2019 as a member of Wanna One. Minhyun's final Wanna One activity before returning to NU'EST was a final concert (titled Therefore) that was held across four days, ending on January 27, 2019.

=== 2019–2020: Happily Ever After, The Table, The Nocturne, Drive ===
After reuniting for the first time in almost two years, NU'EST announced their contract renewal with Pledis Entertainment. On March 15, 2019, they released a special digital single "A Song For You" to celebrate their seventh anniversary since debut.

On April 3, Minhyun released a digital solo single "Universe" as the pre-release single from the upcoming NU'EST album. The single is accompanied by the music video shot in Budapest and Milan. The group held their first solo concert in six-years titled "Segno" on April 12–14 to an audience of 36,000. Their sixth EP Happily Ever After was released on April 29 with the lead single "Bet Bet". It is their first release in three years and the last in the three-part series of "Knights searching for the Queen" narrative which began with their fourth EP in 2016. The EP secured triple crowns on Gaon Chart for the week of April 28 – May 4 by topping the album chart, digital download chart, and BGM chart after its release. In May 2019, NU'EST released an official audio recording of the song "Blessing", which had been recorded as a candidate for their debut song in 2012.

On October 21, the group released their seventh EP The Table with the lead single "Love Me". The single went on to win in all five major music broadcast shows, which also marked the group's first win since debut on Show! Music Core and Inkigayo.

Seven months after their last comeback, the group released their eighth EP The Nocturne with the lead single titled "I'm in Trouble" on May 11, 2020. The album topped the Album Sales, Retail Album, Download, and BGM charts on Gaon's Weekly Chart. "I'm in Trouble" also debuted at no. 6 on Gaon's Digital Chart, becoming the complete group's first lead single since debut to break into the Top 10, excluding their singles as NU'EST W.

On October 7, NU'EST released their second Japanese-language album, "Drive". The song "Drive" is the group's first Japanese album release in 5 years after "Bridge the World".

=== 2021–2022: Romanticize, solo projects, Needle & Bubble and disbandment ===
On April 19, 2021, the group released their second studio album, Romanticize, with the lead single "Inside Out". Only four members participated in full promotions for the album as Aron went on a brief hiatus in January 2021 due to anxiety issues (but performed with the group in music shows), eventually rejoining the group in June. The album topped Hanteo's weekly album sales chart and earned two crowns on the Gaon Music Chart. The lead single also went on to score wins on M! Countdown, Music Bank, Show! Music Core, and Inkigayo, earning the group its second music show grand slam since their single "Love Me" in late 2019.

The group held their first live in-person concert in 2 years titled The Black from November 26 to 28, 2021 at the Jamsil Indoor Stadium in Seoul. On December 2, the group performed in and won the Best Achievement award at the 2021 Asia Artist Awards. Later that month, they performed at the 2021 KBS Song Festival and SBS Gayo Daejeon, held on December 17 and 25, respectively.

In a group interview conducted on January 20, 2022, JR stated that the members had discussed future group activities among themselves and were scheduled to meet with Pledis Entertainment later that day regarding NU'EST's next album.

After nearly a year of no new releases, it was announced on February 28, 2022, that the group's exclusive contract with Pledis Entertainment will end on March 14. It was also announced that members Aron, JR, and Ren will leave the agency at the conclusion of their contract, while Baekho and Minhyun opted to renew. With the news of their contract expiring, the group confirmed their disbandment through handwritten letters to their fans, announcing their decision to pursue individual projects. A compilation album, Needle & Bubble, was released on March 15 to mark the group's 10-year anniversary as they officially disbanded on the same day.

== Members ==
- JR (제이알) – leader
- Aron (아론)
- Baekho (백호)
- Minhyun (민현)
- Ren (렌)

== Philanthropy ==
To mark their seventh debut anniversary, the group donated funds to The Snail of Love in March 2019 to cover cochlear implant surgery and language rehabilitation therapy for children. The donation also helped fund music education programs to help people with developmental disabilities connect with the world through music.

== Sub-groups ==
=== NU'EST-M ===
From 2013 to 2014, NU'EST-M was formed as a sub-group in collaboration with Yuehua Entertainment to exclusively target the Chinese market. All five members participated in NU'EST-M with the addition of Jason, a Chinese trainee from Yuehua Entertainment. The group recorded Chinese versions of the lead singles "Face" and "Sleep Talking."

=== NU'EST W ===
From July 17, 2017, to December 31, 2018, the remaining members of NU'EST promoted as a sub-group, NU'EST W, while Minhyun exclusively promoted with Wanna One. NU'EST W released a total of three EPs before ending promotions in 2018.

== Discography ==
Korean albums

- Re:Birth (2014)
- Romanticize (2021)

Japanese albums

- Bridge the World (2015)
- Drive (2020)

== Filmography ==
=== Television ===
| Year | Title | Notes | Ref. |
|---|---|---|---|
| 2012 | Making of A Star: Landing Operation | 8 episodes | |
| 2013 | NU'EST MTV Diary | 5 episodes | |
| 2013 | NU'EST in Love | 5 episodes | |
| 2014 | NU'EST's Latin Dream Show | | |
| 2016 | NU'EST Private life | 4 episodes | |
| 2019 | NU'EST Road | 4 episodes | |

=== Film ===
- Their Distance (2015)

== Concerts and tours ==
=== Concerts ===
| Year | Title | Ref |
|---|---|---|
| 2013 | NU'EST Show Time in Seoul | |
| 2013 | NU'EST Debut 1st Anniversary Live ～ Show Time | |
| 2013 | NU'EST L.O.Λ.E.'s Party | |
| 2014 | NU'EST Debut 2nd Anniversary Live ～ Show Time 2 | |
| 2014 | NU'EST Autumn Live | |
| 2015 | NU'EST First Solo Show In Dallas | |
| 2016 | NU'EST Live ～ Show Time 4 | |
| 2017 | NU'EST W Special Mini Concert | |
| 2018 | NU'EST W - Double You Encore | |
| 2019 | NU'EST Love Page | |
| 2021 | NU'EST Concert <The Black> | |

=== Tours ===
| Year | Title | Ref |
|---|---|---|
| 2014 | NU'EST Japan Tour One L.O.Λ.E. | |
| 2014 | NU'EST Latin America Tour | |
| 2014 | Re:Sponse Europe Tour | |
| 2015 | NU'EST Japan Tour ～ Show Time 3 | |
| 2015 | NU'EST World Tour Concert RE:VIVE | |
| 2015 | NU'EST Japan Tour ～ Bridge the World | |
| 2016 | NU'EST Japan Tour 'One for L.O.Λ.E' | |
| 2018 | NU'EST W <Double You> | |
| 2019 | NU'EST Tour <Segno> | |
