= List of awards and nominations received by NU'EST =

NU'EST awards and nominations
Awards and nominations
Award	Wins	Nominations
Asia Model Awards	2	2
Asia Artist Awards	5	8
Brand of the Year Awards	1	1
The Fact Music Awards	2	3
Gaon Chart Music Awards	1	5
Golden Disc Awards	5	18
Melon Music Awards	0	1
Migu Music Awards	1	1
Mnet Asian Music Awards	2	14
Seoul Music Awards	3	18
Soribada Best K-Music Awards	2	5
V Live Awards	2	2

Totals (Note: Certain award groups do not simply award one winner. They acknowledge several different recipients, have runners-up, and have third place. Since this is a specific recognition and is different from losing an award, runner-up mentions are considered wins in this award tally. For simplification and to avoid errors, each award in this list has been presumed to have had a prior nomination.)
- Wins: 26
- Nominations: 79

NU'EST is a five-member South Korean boy group composed of JR, Aron, Baekho, Minhyun and Ren. Despite the group's strong debut in 2012, their fame was not sustained in the succeeding years, prompting four of the members to join the reality survival show Produce 101 Season 2 in 2017. After the show, the group saw an incredible surge in popularity, which earned them the title of "Reversal Icons". While Minhyun was promoting in Wanna One, the rest of the members promoted as NU'EST W. As NU'EST W, the group attended and won in their first-ever year-end award ceremony since debut. In an interview, they shared that it already felt like a dream just to be invited to attend the ceremony so they did not even expect to win anything. The group has since then consistently secured multiple awards and nominations from various award-giving bodies throughout their promotions as NU'EST W and continued with their reunion as five members in 2019.

== Awards and nominations ==
Name of the award ceremony, year presented, category, nominee(s) of the award, and the result of the nomination
Award ceremony	Year	Category	Nominee / work	Result	Ref.
Asia Artist Awards	2017	Best Entertainer Award	NU'EST W	Won	
Asia Artist Awards	2017	Popularity Award	NU'EST W	Nominated	
Asia Artist Awards	2018	Artist of the Year	NU'EST W	Won	
Asia Artist Awards	2018	Best Music Award	NU'EST W	Won	
Asia Artist Awards	2018	Popularity Award	NU'EST W	Nominated	
Asia Artist Awards	2019	Asia Celebrity (Music)	NU'EST	Won	
Asia Artist Awards	2019	Best Musician	NU'EST	Won	
Asia Artist Awards	2019	StarNews Popularity Award	NU'EST	Nominated	
Asia Artist Awards	2021	Best Achievement Award	NU'EST	Won	
Asia Artist Awards	2021	Male Idol Group Popularity Award	NU'EST	Nominated	
Asia Model Awards	2018	Popular Star Award (Singer)	NU'EST	Won	
Asia Model Awards	2018	Special Asia Award	NU'EST	Won	
Brand of the Year Awards	2019	Male Idol of the Year	NU'EST	Won	
The Fact Music Awards	2019	Artist of the Year (Bonsang)	NU'EST	Won	
The Fact Music Awards	2019	Fan N Star Hall of Fame (Artist)	NU'EST	Won	
The Fact Music Awards	2019	Fan N Star Choice Award (Artist)	NU'EST	Nominated	
Gaon Chart Music Awards	2018	Song of the Year – July	"If You"	Nominated	
Gaon Chart Music Awards	2018	Album of the Year – 4th Quarter	W, Here	Nominated	
Gaon Chart Music Awards	2018	Song of the Year – October	"Where You At"	Nominated	
Gaon Chart Music Awards	2018	Hot Performance of the Year	NU'EST W	Won	
Gaon Chart Music Awards	2019	Album of the Year – 2nd Quarter	Who, You	Nominated	
Golden Disc Awards	2013	Disc Bonsang Award	"Face"	Nominated	
Golden Disc Awards	2013	Popularity Award	NU'EST	Nominated	
Golden Disc Awards	2013	Rookie of the Year	NU'EST	Nominated	
Golden Disc Awards	2018	Disc Bonsang	W, Here	Won	
Golden Disc Awards	2018	Disc Daesang	W, Here	Nominated	
Golden Disc Awards	2018	Global Popularity Award	NU'EST W	Nominated	
Golden Disc Awards	2019	Disc Daesang	Who, You	Nominated	
Golden Disc Awards	2019	Disc Bonsang	Who, You	Won	
Golden Disc Awards	2019	Popularity Award	NU'EST W	Nominated	
Golden Disc Awards	2019	NetEase Most Popular K-pop Star	NU'EST W	Nominated	
Golden Disc Awards	2020	Disc Bonsang	Wake, N	Nominated	
Golden Disc Awards	2020	Disc Bonsang	Happily Ever After	Won	
Golden Disc Awards	2020	Disc Daesang	Happily Ever After	Nominated	
Golden Disc Awards	2020	Cosmopolitan Artist Award	NU'EST	Won	
Golden Disc Awards	2020	Popularity Award	NU'EST	Nominated	
Golden Disc Awards	2021	Golden Choice Award	NU'EST	Won	
Golden Disc Awards	2021	Curaprox Popularity Award	NU'EST	Nominated	
Golden Disc Awards	2021	QQ Music Popularity Award	NU'EST	Nominated	
Golden Disc Awards	2022	Album Bonsang	Romanticize	Nominated	
Golden Disc Awards	2022	Seenz Most Popular Artist Award	NU'EST	Nominated	
Melon Music Awards	2018	Best Male Dance	"Dejavu"	Nominated	
Migu Music Awards	2015	Best Potential Group	NU'EST	Won	
Mnet Asian Music Awards	2017	Best Male Group	NU'EST W	Nominated	
Mnet Asian Music Awards	2017	Artist of the Year	NU'EST W	Nominated	
Mnet Asian Music Awards	2017	Discovery of the Year	NU'EST W	Won	
Mnet Asian Music Awards	2017	2017 Favorite KPOP Star	NU'EST W	Nominated	
Mnet Asian Music Awards	2018	Global Top 10 Fan's Choice	NU'EST W	Won	
Mnet Asian Music Awards	2018	Best Male Group	NU'EST W	Nominated	
Mnet Asian Music Awards	2018	Artist of the Year	NU'EST W	Nominated	
Mnet Asian Music Awards	2018	Worldwide Icon of the Year	NU'EST W	Nominated	
Mnet Asian Music Awards	2018	Best OST	"And I"	Nominated	
Mnet Asian Music Awards	2019	Song of the Year	"Bet Bet"	Nominated	
Mnet Asian Music Awards	2019	Best Dance Performance (Male Group)	"Bet Bet"	Nominated	
Mnet Asian Music Awards	2019	Worldwide Fans’ Choice Top 10	NU'EST	Nominated	
Mnet Asian Music Awards	2020	Best Vocal Performance – Group	"I'm In Trouble"	Nominated	
Mnet Asian Music Awards	2020	Song of the Year	"I'm In Trouble"	Nominated	
Seoul Music Awards	2013	Rookie Award	NU'EST	Nominated	
Seoul Music Awards	2013	Popularity Award	NU'EST	Nominated	
Seoul Music Awards	2018	Daesang Award	NU'EST W	Nominated	
Seoul Music Awards	2018	Bonsang Award	NU'EST W	Won	
Seoul Music Awards	2018	Popularity Award	NU'EST W	Nominated	
Seoul Music Awards	2018	Hallyu Special Award	NU'EST W	Nominated	
Seoul Music Awards	2019	Bonsang Award	NU'EST W	Won	
Seoul Music Awards	2019	Daesang Award	NU'EST W	Nominated	
Seoul Music Awards	2019	Popularity Award	NU'EST W	Nominated	
Seoul Music Awards	2019	Hallyu Special Award	NU'EST W	Nominated	
Seoul Music Awards	2020	Bonsang Award	NU'EST	Won	
Seoul Music Awards	2020	Hallyu Special Award	NU'EST	Nominated	
Seoul Music Awards	2020	Popularity Award	NU'EST	Nominated	
Seoul Music Awards	2020	QQ Music Most Popular K-Pop Artist Award	NU'EST	Nominated	
Seoul Music Awards	2020	Fan PD Artist Award	NU'EST	Nominated	
Seoul Music Awards	2021	Bonsang Award	NU'EST	Won	
Seoul Music Awards	2021	Popularity Award	NU'EST	Nominated	
Seoul Music Awards	2021	K-wave Popularity Award	NU'EST	Nominated	
Seoul Music Awards	2021	Fan PD Artist Award	NU'EST	Nominated	
Soribada Best K-Music Awards	2018	Bonsang Award	NU'EST W	Won	
Soribada Best K-Music Awards	2018	New Hallyu Icon Award	NU'EST W	Won	
Soribada Best K-Music Awards	2018	Popularity Award (Male)	NU'EST W	Nominated	
Soribada Best K-Music Awards	2019	Main Prize (Bonsang)	NU'EST	Nominated	
Soribada Best K-Music Awards	2019	Popularity Award	NU'EST	Nominated	
V Live Awards	2018	Global Artist Top 10	NU'EST	Won	
V Live Awards	2019	Global Artist Top 10	NU'EST W	Won	
