= List of Gaon Album Chart number ones of 2017 =

The Gaon Album Chart is a South Korean record chart that ranks the best-selling albums and EPs in South Korea. It is part of the Gaon Music Chart, which launched in February 2010. The data are compiled by the Ministry of Culture, Sports and Tourism and the Korea Music Content Industry Association based upon weekly/monthly physical album sales by major South Korean distributors such as LOEN Entertainment, Genie Music, Sony Music Korea, Warner Music Korea, Universal Music and Mnet Media.

== Weekly charts ==
Week ending date	Album	Artist	Ref.
January 7	Made	Big Bang	
January 14	Limitless	NCT 127	
January 21	Don't Say No	Seohyun	
January 28	Guardian OST Pack (도깨비 OST Pack)	Various artists	
February 4	Rookie	Red Velvet	
February 11	The First	NCT Dream	
February 18	You Never Walk Alone	BTS	
February 25	Twicecoaster: Lane 2	Twice	
March 4	My Voice	Taeyeon	
March 11	The Awakening	GFriend	
March 18	Flight Log: Arrival	Got7	
March 25	Can You Feel It?	Highlight	
April 1	Flight Log: Arrival	Got7	
April 8	My Voice (Deluxe Edition)	Taeyeon	
April 15	High Five	Teen Top	
April 22	Miss This Kiss	Laboum	
April 29	Palette	IU	
May 6	Now, We (지금, 우리) (Repackage)	Lovelyz	
May 13	The 20th Anniversary	Sechs Kies	
May 20	Signal	Twice	
May 27	Al1	Seventeen	
June 3	Dream Part.01	Astro	
June 10	Al1	Seventeen	
June 17	Be Ordinary	Hwang Chi-yeul	
June 24	Shine Forever (Repackage)	Monsta X	
July 1	Pink Up	Apink	
July 8	Star;dom	UP10TION	
July 15	The Red Summer	Red Velvet	
July 22	The War (Korean Version)	Exo	
July 28	The War (Korean Version)	Exo	
August 5	The War (Korean Version)	Exo	
August 12	1X1=1 (To Be One)	Wanna One	
August 19	1X1=1 (To Be One)	Wanna One	
August 26	1X1=1 (To Be One)	Wanna One	
September 2	Whisper	VIXX LR	
September 9	The War: The Power of Music (Korean Version)	Exo	
September 16	The War: The Power of Music (Korean Version)	Exo	
September 23	Love Yourself 承 'Her'	BTS	
September 30	Rollin'	B1A4	
October 7	—		
October 14	W, Here	NU'EST W	
October 21	Love Yourself 承 'Her'	BTS	
October 28	7 for 7	Got7	
November 4	Twicetagram	Twice	
November 11	Teen, Age	Seventeen	
November 18	1-1=0 (Nothing Without You)	Wanna One	
November 25	Be Ordinary	Hwang Chi-yeul	
December 2	Play (Pause Version)	Super Junior	
December 9	7 for 7	Got7	
December 16	Merry & Happy	Twice	
December 23	The Code	Monsta X	
December 30	Universe	Exo	

== Monthly charts ==
Month	Album	Artist	Sales	Ref.
January	Made	BigBang	142,652	
February	You Never Walk Alone	BTS	713,063	
March	Flight Log: Arrival	Got7	278,103	
April	My Voice (Deluxe Edition)	Taeyeon	67,486	
May	Al1	Seventeen	259,364	
June	Be Ordinary	Hwang Chi-yeul	112,783	
July	The War (Korean Version)	Exo	808,655	
August	1X1=1 (To Be One)	Wanna One	704,616	
September	Love Yourself 承 'Her'	BTS	1,203,533	
October	W, Here	NU'EST W	287,862	
November	1-1=0 (Nothing Without You)	Wanna One	603,503	
December	Universe	Exo	516,062	
