= 32nd Golden Disc Awards =

2018 South Korean music awards ceremony

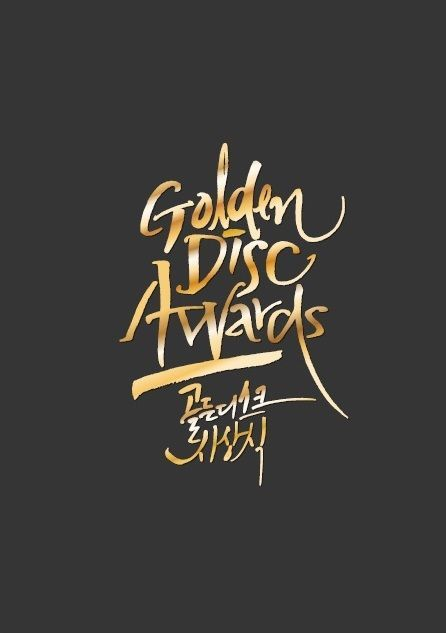
- Sponsored by: Penta Global Advisers Fund; Genie Music
- Date: January 10–11, 2018
- Location: Korea International Exhibition Center, Ilsan, Gyeonggi Province
- Country: South Korea
- Hosted by: Lee Seung-gi; Lee Sung-kyung; Kang So-ra; Sung Si-kyung

Television/radio coverage
- Network: JTBC, JTBC2

The 32nd Golden Disc Awards ceremony was held on January 10–11, 2018. The JTBC network broadcast the show from the Korea International Exhibition Center (KINTEX) in Ilsan. It is the second consecutive year that the show was hosted at the venue. Lee Seung-gi and Lee Sung-kyung served as hosts on the first day, with Kang So-ra and Sung Si-kyung on the second.

== Background ==
Organized by All Access Productions and HM Entertainment in cooperation with Lumos E&M and broadcasting company JTBC, the 32nd Golden Disc Awards was scheduled to take place at the Mall of Asia Arena in Manila on January 10 and 11, 2018. It would have marked the Philippines' first opportunity to host the show, as well as the ceremony's fourth to be held in a foreign country. Ticket sales began on November 26, but JTBC announced that "[a]ll kinds of promotions or ticket sales that are currently in progress are not in anyway related to Golden Disc Awards" due to the ceremony's location remaining unconfirmed. The event was ultimately pulled from the country. All Access Productions cited its domestic financier's "failure to comply with their responsibility to the owner of the original Golden Disc Awards Ceremony" as the reason for cancellation.

The show was sponsored by Penta Global Advisers Fund and Genie Music, and was held at the Korea International Exhibition Center in the town of Ilsan in Goyang, Gyeonggi Province for a second consecutive year. The first day of the ceremony, which highlighted digital album sales, was hosted by Lee Seung-gi and Lee Sung-kyung. Kang So-ra and Sung Si-kyung served as hosts, for the second year in a row, on the following day which bestowed physical sales awards.

== Criteria ==
Albums and songs released between December 1, 2016, and November 30, 2017, were eligible to be nominated for the 32nd Golden Disc Awards. The awards committee decided to eliminate online voting from the criteria of the Grand Prize Golden Disc, Best Artist, and Rookie Artist of the Year awards; winners were determined by music sales (80%) and a panel of 30 selected music experts (20%). The Popularity Award was calculated entirely from online votes.

== Winners and nominees ==
Winners are listed first in alphabetical order and emphasized in bold.

Nominee lists adapted from Ilgan Sports. Winners adapted from Maeil Business Newspaper.

Digital Daesang (Song of the Year)	Disc Daesang (Album of the Year)
**IU – "Through the Night"**; AKMU – "Last Goodbye"; Big Bang – "Fxxk It"; Blackpink – "As If It's Your Last"; Bolbbalgan4 – "Tell Me You Love Me"; BTS – "Spring Day"; Heize – "You, Clouds, Rain" (featuring Shin Yong-jae); Red Velvet – "Red Flavor"; Twice – "Knock Knock"; Winner – "Really Really"; Yoon Jong-shin – "Like It"	**BTS – Love Yourself: Her**; Exo – The War; Girls' Generation – Holiday Night; Got7 – Flight Log: Arrival; Hwang Chi-yeul – Be Ordinary; Monsta X – The Code; NU'EST W – W, Here; Seventeen – Teen, Age; Taeyeon – My Voice; Twice – Twicetagram
Digital Song Bonsang	Album Bonsang
**AKMU – "Last Goodbye"**; **Big Bang – "Fxxk It"**; **Blackpink – "As If It's Your Last"**; **Bolbbalgan4 – "Tell Me You Love Me"**; **BTS – "Spring Day"**; **Heize – "You, Clouds, Rain" (featuring Shin Yong-jae)**; **IU – "Through the Night"**; **Red Velvet – "Red Flavor"**; **Twice – "Knock Knock"**; **Winner – "Really Really"**; **Yoon Jong-shin – "Like It"**; Block B – "Yesterday"; G-Dragon – "Untitled, 2014"; Han Dong-geun – "Crazy"; Highlight – "Plz Don't Be Sad"; Hwang Chi-yeul – "A Daily Song"; Hyolyn, Changmo – "Blue Moon" (produced by GroovyRoom); Hyukoh – "Tomboy"; Jung Key – "Anymore" (featuring Wheein of Mamamoo); Mad Clown – "Lost Without You" (featuring Bolbbalgan4); Mamamoo – "Yes I Am"; MeloMance – "Gift"; Psy – "New Face"; Sunmi – "Gashina"; Suran – "Wine" (featuring Changmo; produced by Suga); Taeyeon – "Fine"; Wanna One – "Energetic"; Woo Won-jae – "We Are" (featuring Loco and Gray); Zico – "Artist"; Zion.T – "The Song"	**BTS – Love Yourself: Her**; **Exo – The War**; **Girls' Generation – Holiday Night**; **Got7 – Flight Log: Arrival**; **Hwang Chi-yeul – Be Ordinary**; **Monsta X – The Code**; **NU'EST W – W, Here**; **Seventeen – Teen, Age**; **Taeyeon – My Voice**; **Twice – Twicetagram**; Apink – Pink Up; Astro – Dream Part.01; B1A4 – Rollin'; BtoB – Brother Act.; CNBLUE – 7°CN; GFriend – The Awakening; IU – Palette; JJ Project – Verse 2; Jung Yong-hwa – Do Disturb; Lovelyz – R U Ready?; NCT 127 – Cherry Bomb; Red Velvet – Perfect Velvet; Sechs Kies – Another Light; Shinhwa – Unchanging Touch; Taemin – Move; Taeyang – White Night; Teen Top – High Five; Up10tion – Star:dom; Weki Meki – Weme
Rookie Artist of the Year	Global Popular Artist
**Wanna One**; Chungha; JBJ; Jeong Se-woon; Longguo & Shihyun; MXM; Pristin; Samuel; Weki Meki; Woo Won-jae	**Exo**; List of nominees: AKMU; Apink; Astro; B1A4; Big Bang; Blackpink; Block B; Bolbbalgan4; BtoB; BTS; Chungha; CNBLUE; G-Dragon; GFriend; Girls' Generation; Got7; Han Dong-geun; Heize; Highlight; Hwang Chi-yeul; Hyolyn and Changmo; Hyukoh; IU; JBJ; Jeong Se-woon; JJ Project; Jung Key; Jung Yong-hwa; Longguo & Shihyun; Lovelyz; Mad Clown; Mamamoo; MeloMance; Monsta X; MXM; NCT 127; NU'EST W; Pristin; Psy; Red Velvet; Samuel; Sechs Kies; Seventeen; Shinhwa; Sunmi; Super Junior; Suran; Taemin; Taeyang; Taeyeon; Teen Top; Twice; Up10tion; Wanna One; Weki Meki; Winner; Woo Won-jae; Yoon Jong-shin; Zico; Zion.T

=== Genre and other awards ===
Award	Winner
Best Rock Band Award	Hyukoh
Best R&B/Soul Award	Suran
Best OST Award	Ailee
Best Male Group Award	BtoB
Best Female Group Award	GFriend
Ceci Asia Icon Award	Exo
Ceci Asia Icon Award	Twice
Genie Music Popularity Award	Exo

== Multiple nominations ==
Record company YG Entertainment received the most nominations among any label with ten. Big Bang, AKMU, Zion.T, Hyukoh, Blackpink, G-Dragon, Psy, and Winner received digital song nominations, while Taeyang and Sechs Kies received album nominations. Including double nominees in multiple categories, it was followed by S.M. Entertainment with nine. Red Velvet, Girls' Generation, Super Junior, Taemin, Taeyeon, Exo, and NCT 127 all received album nominations; Red Velvet and Taeyeon were concurrently digital song nominees. JYP Entertainment garnered four nominations: Got7, JJ Project, and Twice were nominated in the albums category, with the lattermost receiving an additional nomination in the digital song category. Starship Entertainment, along with its sub-label Starship X, received three nominations (Mad Clown, Monsta X, and Jeong Se-woon).

== Gallery ==
Award ceremony gallery

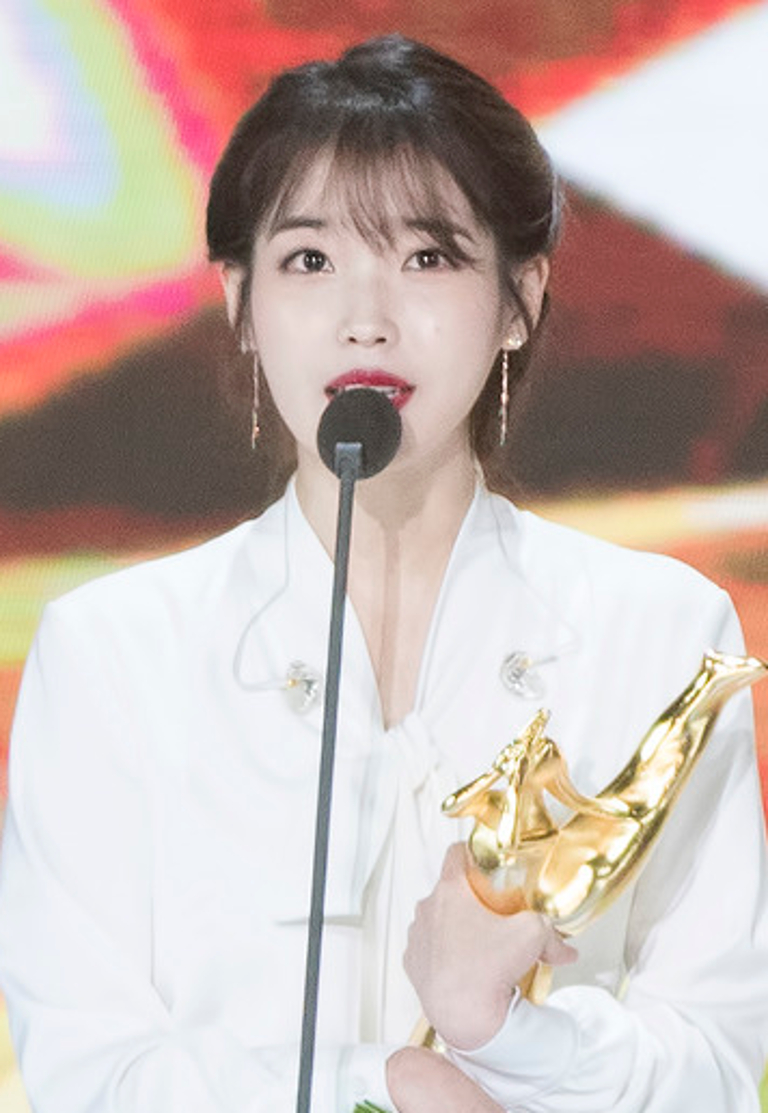
IU after winning Digital Daesang

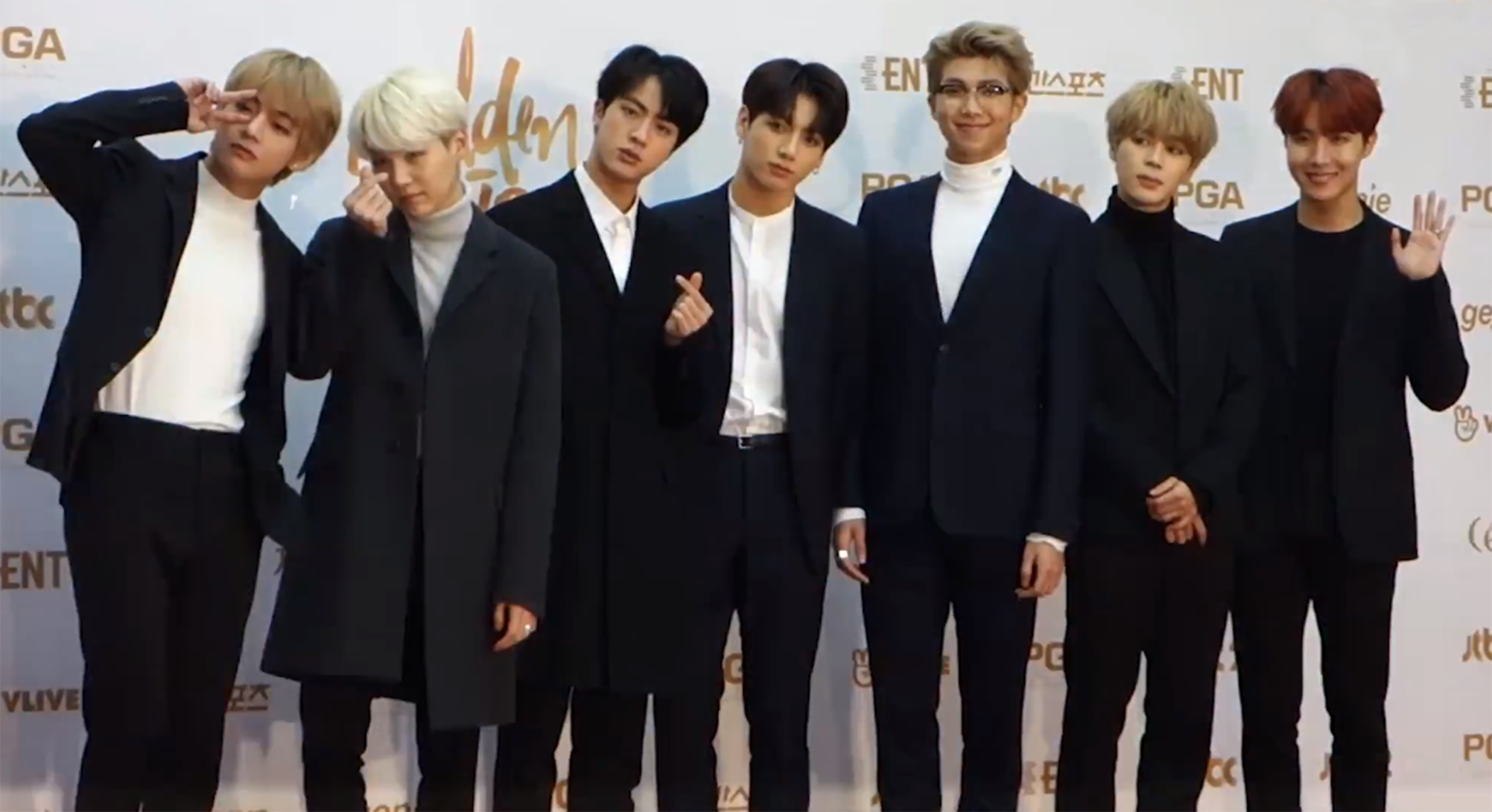
BTS

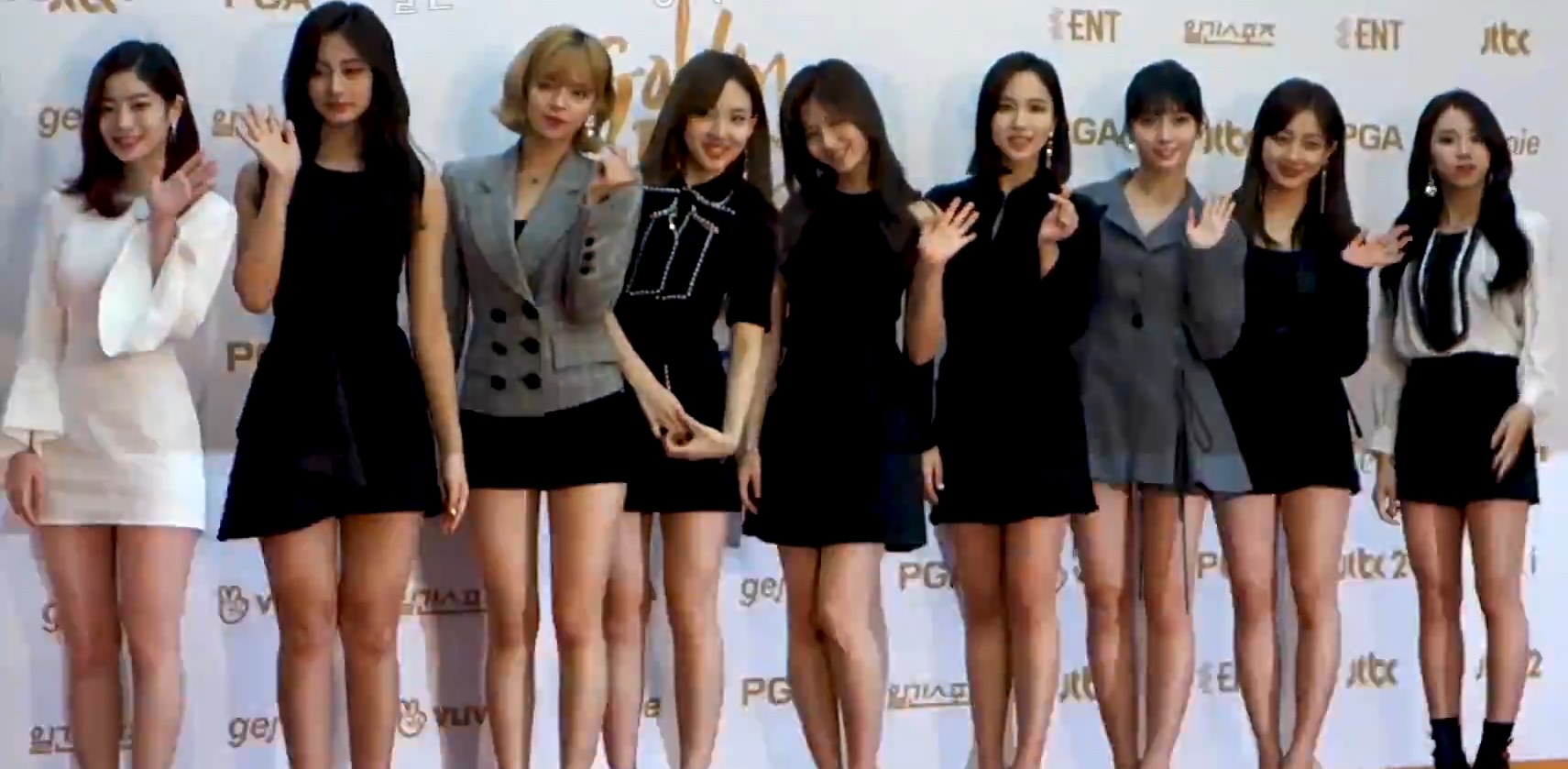
Twice

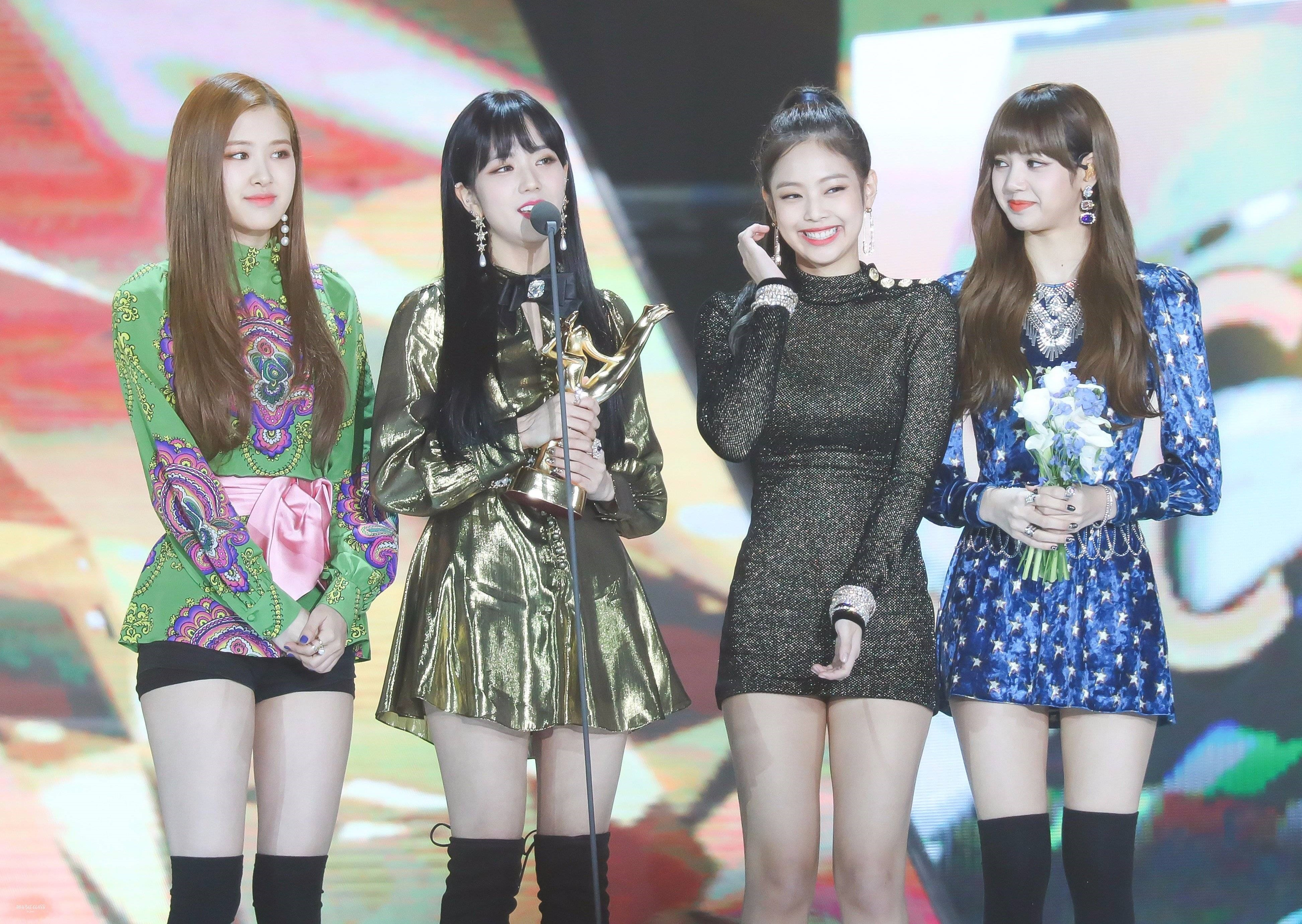
Blackpink after winning Digital Bonsang

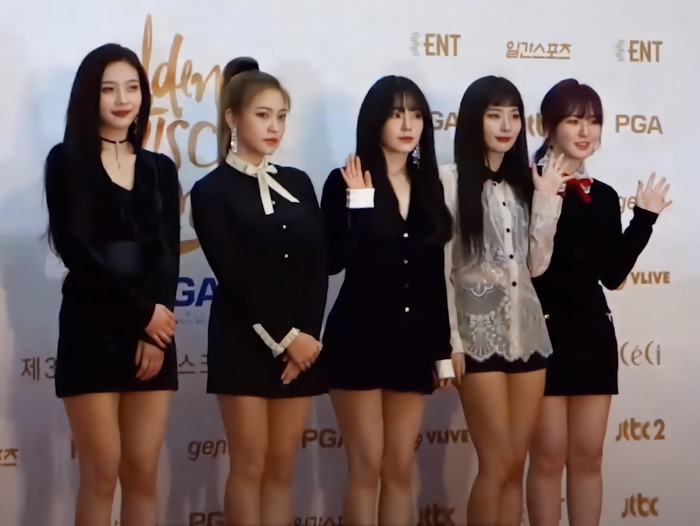
Red Velvet

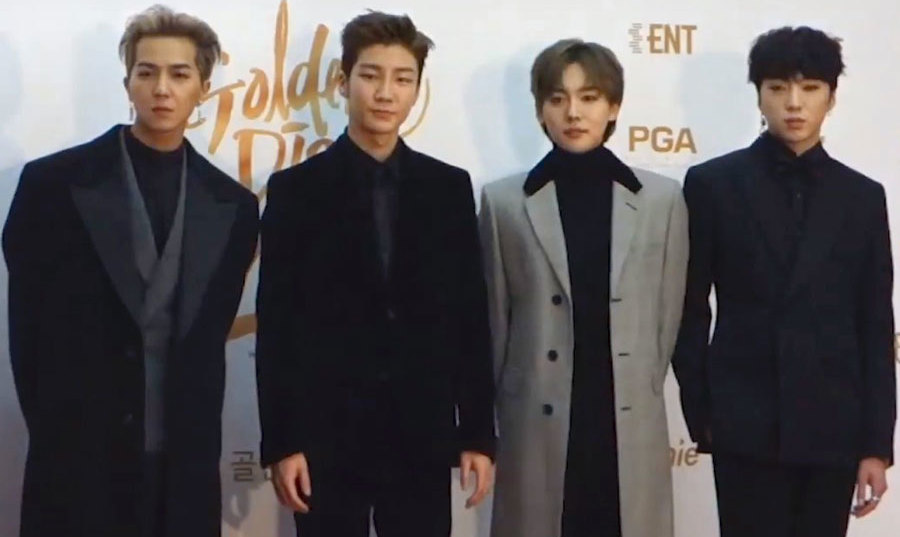
Winner

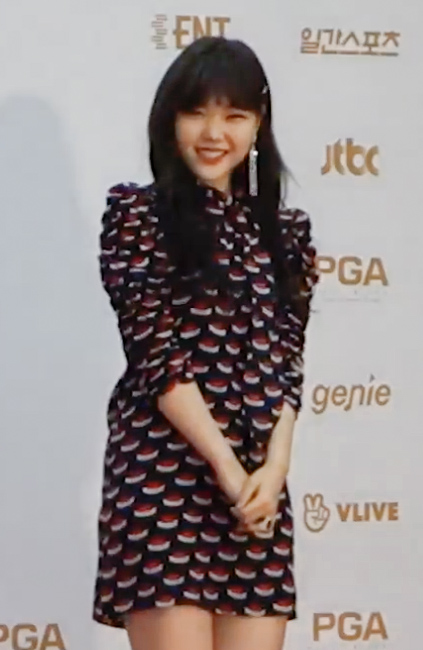
AKMU's Lee Su-hyun

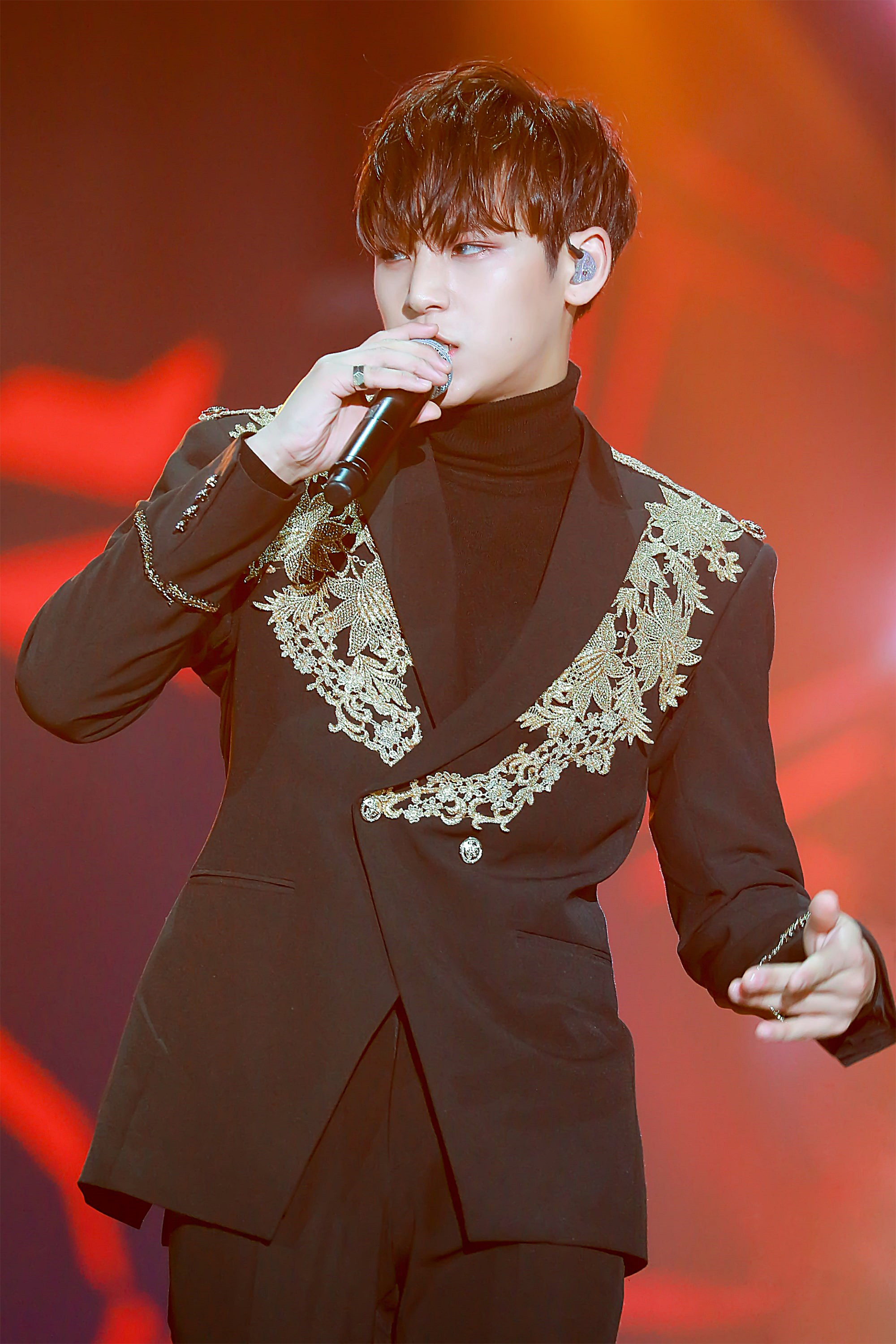
Seventeen's Mingyu

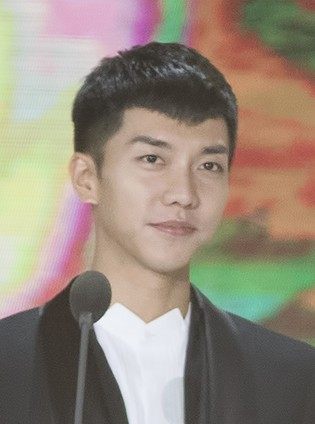
Lee Seung-gi

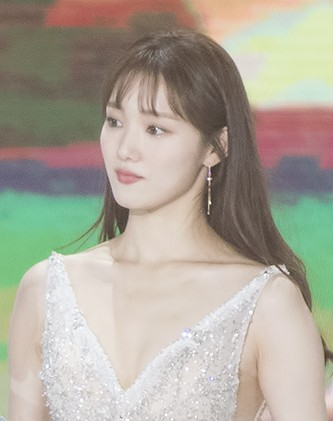
Lee Sung-kyung
