= David Kang (disambiguation) =

David Kang (born 1970) is an Australian barrister who fired blanks at Prince Charles in 1994.

David Kang may also refer to:

- David C. Kang (born 1965), American political scientist
- David Kang (taekwondo), American medalist in the 1993 World Taekwondo Championships
- David Kang, actor in the cast of the 2009 film A Serious Man
- David Kang, South Korean keyboardist on the 2017 album Be Ordinary by Hwang Chi-yeul
