= My Lovely Journey =

2025 South Korean television series

- Promotional poster
- Also known as: We'll take care of your travel for you
- Hangul: 여행을 대신해 드립니다
- RR: Yeohaengeul daesinhae deurimnida
- MR: Yŏhaengŭl taesinhae tŭrimnida
- Genre: Romantic drama Slice of life
- Based on: Welcome Back, Traveler by Maha Harada
- Written by: Jung Hoe-hyun
- Directed by: Kang Sool
- Starring: Gong Seung-yeon; Yoo Jun-sang; Kim Jae-young; Hong Soo-hyun; Oh Hyun-joong
- Music by: Ji Pyeong-kwon; Yoo Jun-sang (OST)
- Country of origin: South Korea
- Original language: Korean
- No. of episodes: 10

Production
- Executive producers: Park Jong-eun (CP); Kang Eun-seon; Jeong A-ri-su
- Producers: Kang Kyung-sik; Kwak Jin-woo; Shin In-soo; Hwang Dong-seop
- Production location: South Korea
- Running time: 60 minutes
- Production company: Big Ocean ENM

Original release
- Network: Channel A
- Release: August 2 – August 31, 2025

My Lovely Journey (Korean: 여행을 대신해 드립니다) is a 2025 South Korean weekend drama series produced by Big Ocean ENM for Channel A. Based on Maha Harada's Japanese novel Welcome Back, Traveler, it stars Gong Seung-yeon, Yoo Jun-sang, Kim Jae-young, Hong Soo-hyun, and Oh Hyun-joong. It aired on Channel A from August 2, to August 31 2025, every Saturday and Sunday at 21:20 (KST).

== Synopsis ==
Kang Yeo-reum, a former idol-turned-travel journalist, rediscovers meaning and personal growth by arranging transformative journeys for others.

== Cast ==
=== Main ===
- Gong Seung-yeon as Kang Yeo-reum – A former idol and now a travel columnist for a lifestyle-TV show.
- Yoo Joon-sang as Oh Sang-sik – CEO of Ohkoo Entertainment and Yeo-reum's manager.
- Kim Jae-young as Lee Yeon-seok – An engineering graduate turned part-time assistant to Yeo-reum.
- Hong Soo-hyun as Yoo Ha-na – CFO at Ohkoo Entertainment with a ten-year bond with Sang-sik.
- Oh Hyun-joong as Hyun-poong – Planning director at Ohkoo Entertainment and Yeo-reum's agent.

=== Supporting ===
- Yoo Ji-yeon as Yang Seon-ah – Sang-sik's ex-wife and bar owner.
- Dong Hyun-bae as PD Song – A producer hoping to star a celebrity-led variety show.
- Kang Dong-ho as Cha Shi-wan – Former idol turned actor.
- Park Bo-yeon as Go Eun-chae – Former idol group member with Yeo-reum.
- Yoo Soo-jung as Han Yu-ri
- Kim Hye-hwa as Kate Scott
- Jin-goo as Lee Jung-woo
- Ha Seok-jin as Cha Young-hoon
- Nam Gi-ae as Seong I-hwa
- Rie Tomosaka as Haruko Sato

== Production ==
Big Ocean ENM announced in March 2023 that it had secured adaptation rights to Harada's 2012 novel published by Shueisha. The first official posters—traditional folk paintings by Nam Jung-e—were released May 30, followed by ink-wash collaborations in September.

== Ratings ==
Average TV viewership ratings (Nationwide)
Ep.	Original broadcast date	Average audience share (Nielsen Korea)
1	August 2, 2025	0.6% (36th)
2	August 3, 2025	0.3% (51th)
3	August 9, 2025	0.2% (54th)
4	August 10, 2025	0.5% (41th)
5	August 16, 2025	0.3% (51th)
6	August 17, 2025	0.5% (44th)
7	August 23, 2025	0.2% (59th)
8	August 24, 2025	0.3% (53th)
9	August 30, 2025	0.3% (41th)
10	August 31, 2025	0.2% (57th)
Average		_
In the table above, the blue numbers represent the lowest ratings and the red numbers represent the highest ratings.
