= Pink Doll =

Studio album by Apink
- Released: December 21, 2016
- Genres: J-pop; Dance
- Length: 42:23
- Label: Universal Music Japan

Apink chronology
Dear (2016)	Pink Doll (2016)	Pink Up (2017)

Singles from Pink Doll
- 1. "Sunday Monday" Released: December 9, 2015; 2. "Brand New Day" Released: March 23, 2016; 3. "Summer Time!" Released: August 3, 2016

Pink Doll (stylized as PINK♥DOLL) is the second Japanese full-length studio album by the South Korean girl group Apink, and was released by Universal Music Japan on December 21, 2016.

== Editions ==
The album was originally released in four different editions: Limited Edition A, Limited Edition B, Limited Edition C and the Regular Edition.

== Track listing ==
CD
No.	Title	Lyrics	Music	Length
1.	"My First Love"	Shoko Fujibayashi	HEUKTAE, Jang Jung Suk, Yoon Jong Sung	03:36
2.	"It Girl" (Japanese Ver)	Kanao Itabashi	Kim Gunwoo, Songgihong in BlueBridge	03:24
3.	"Summer Time!" (サマータイム！)	Shoko Fujibayashi	HEUKTAE, Jang Jung Suk, Yoon Jong Sung	03:39
4.	"Brand New Days"	Shoko Fujibayashi	Beom & Nang	03:44
5.	"Shining Star"	HASEGAWA	CR, Lee Hyun Sang	03:44
6.	"Sunshine Girl"	Mahiro	Han Sang Won	03:41
7.	"Amai Koi Shiyouyo" (甘い恋しようよ)	Ume	HEUKTAE, Jang Jung Suk	03:34
8.	"Yeah" (Japanese Ver.)	Shiho, Shinsadong Tiger, Choi Kyusung	Choi Kyusung, Shinsadong Tiger	03:14
9.	"Fanfare!" (ファンファーレ！)	Rie Tsukagoshi	Han Sang Won, ak47	02:57
10.	"Sunday Monday" (Japanese Ver.)	Satoko Aida, Beom & Nang	Nickel	03:35
11.	"Petal" (花占い) (Japanese Ver.)	PA-NON, Beom & Nang	Beom & Nang	03:36
12.	"If I...."	HI-D	Lee Joohyoung(MonoTree), GDLO(MonoTree)	03:39
Total length:				42:23

DVD (Limited Edition B)
No.	Title	Length
1.	"SUNDAY MONDAY -Japanese Ver.-" (Music Video)
2.	"Brand New Days" (Music Video)
3.	"Brand New Days (Dance feat. Ver.)" (Music Video)
4.	"Summer Time!" (Music Video)
5.	"Summer Time! (Dance feat. Ver. (Cheerleader))" (Music Video)
6.	"Summer Time! (Dance feat. Ver. (School Edition))" (Music Video)
7.	""Apink's Shooting Sketch in Summer" (‘Summer Time!’ Release Event 7days Document)" ("Apink's Shooting Sketch in Summer" (『サマータイム!』リリースイベント7daysドキュメント))
