= Romanticize (album) =

Studio album by NU'EST
- Released: April 19, 2021
- Genre: K-pop
- Length: 32:50
- Label: Pledis YG Plus
- Producer: Baekho; Bumzu

NU'EST chronology
Drive (2020)	Romanticize (2021)	Needle & Bubble (2022)

Singles from Romanticize
- 1. "Inside Out" Released: April 19, 2021

Romanticize is the second and final full-length studio album by the South Korean boyband NU'EST, released on April 19, 2021. This is NU'EST's first Korean full-length album since 2014's Re:Birth. The album has 10 tracks including the lead single "Inside Out".

== Commercial performance ==
Romanticize debuted and charted at number 6 on the Gaon Album Chart in the month of April, selling over 206,188 copies. The album also gained the third highest first week sales in the month of April.

== Track listing ==
No.	Title	Lyrics	Music	Arrangements	Length
1.	"Dress"	Baekho, Bumzu, Jay & Rudy, Glenn (PRISMFILTER)	Bumzu, Baekho, Jay & Rudy, BuildingOwner,	Bumzu	3:13
2.	"Inside Out"	Baekho, Jr, BUMZU, G-HIGH (MonoTree), Inner Child (MonoTree)	Bumzu, Baekho, Anchor (PRISMFILTER), G-HIGH (MonoTree), Inner Child (MonoTree), Jay & Rudy	BUMZU, Anchor (PRISMFILTER), G-HIGH (MonoTree)	3:17
3.	"Don't Wanna Go"	Baekho, Bumzu	Baekho, Bumzu, Park Gi-tae	Park Gi-Tae	3:00
4.	"Black"	Baekho, JR, Bumzu, Glenn (PRISMFILTER)	BUMZU, Baekho	BUMZU, Park Gi-Tae, Corey K (The Yoo Group)	3:15
5.	"Drive (Korean Ver)"	Baekho, JR, Bumzu,	Baekho, Bumzu, Ohway! (PRISMFILTER)	BUMZU, Ohway! (PRISMFILTER)	3:37
6.	"Earphone (Minhyun Solo)"	Minhyun, Bumzu	BUMZU, Minhyun, Glenn (PRISMFILTER), Hey Farmer	Hey Farmer	3:10
7.	"Need It (Baekho Solo)"	Baekho, Bumzu	Bumzu, Baekho, Anchor (PRISMFILTER)	Bumzu, Baekho, Anchor (PRISMFILTER)	3:23
8.	"Doom Doom (JR Solo)"	JR, Bumzu	Bumzu, Nmore (PRISMFILTER), Ohway! (PRISMFILTER) An Ki Hoon	Bumzu, JR, Nmore (PRISMFILTER), Ohway! (PRISMFILTER) An Ki Hoon	3:09
9.	"Rocket Rocket (Ren Solo)"	Ren	Bumzu, Anchor (PRISMFILTER), Bir$day	Ren, Anchor (PRISMFILTER), Bir$day	3:17
10.	"I'm Not (Aron Solo)"	Aron, Baekho Glenn (PRISMFILTER)	Bumzu, Aron, Park Gi-Tae, Ohway! (PRISMFILTER), Glenn (PRISMFILTER)	Ohway! (PRISMFILTER)	3:25
Total length:					32:50

== Charts ==
=== Weekly charts ===
Chart performance for Romanticize
Chart (2021)	Peak position
Japanese Albums (Oricon)	5
South Korean Albums (Gaon)	2

=== Year-end charts ===
Year-end chart performance for Romanticize
Chart (2021)	Position
South Korean Albums (Gaon)	54

== Accolades ==
=== Music programs awards ===
Song	Program	Date	Ref.
"Inside Out"	M Countdown (Mnet)	April 29, 2021	
"Inside Out"	Music Bank (KBS2)	April 30, 2021	
"Inside Out"	Show! Music Core (MBC)	May 1, 2021	
"Inside Out"	Inkigayo (SBS)	May 2, 2021	
