= Park Bo-yeon =

South Korean actress (born 1994)

- Born: 15 April 1994 (age 31); Seoul, South Korea
- Other names: Park Bo-yun
- Occupation: Actress
- Years active: 2019–present
- Agent: Management District

Park Bo-yeon is a South Korean actress. She is known for her roles in dramas such as Find Me if You Can, I Have Not Done My Best Yet and Cheer Up.

== Personal life ==
On October 31, 2022, Astro Rocky's agency confirmed that they are in a relationship. However, Park's agency dismissed the rumors as false earlier the same day, saying, "We confirmed with actor Park that the two are good colleagues ever since working together on Find Me if You Can last year."

== Filmography ==
=== Television series ===
Year	Title	Role	Ref.
2022	I Have Not Done My Best Yet	No Mi-na	
2022	Cheer Up	Lee Yu-min	
2024	My Little Puppy	Choi Si-yeon	
2025	Karma	Sang-hoon's wife	
2025	My Lovely Journey	Go Eun-chae	

=== Web series ===
Year	Title	Role	Ref.
2019	One Fine Week	Lu Ni	
2019	True Ending	Seong Ye-eun	
2020	One Fine Week 2	Lu Ni	
2021	Find Me If You Can	Shim Soon-jeong	

=== Music video appearances ===
Year	Title	Artist	Length	Ref.
2019	Heavy Snow Watch	Chun Yong-sung	4:16	
2019	Your Mind Has Changed	Jeong Hyo-bin	4:00	
2019	Miracle	Soran	4:00	
2020	Word	Jeong In-hye	4:00	
