= The Code (EP) =

EP by Monsta X
- Released: November 7, 2017
- Recorded: 2017
- Genre: K-pop
- Length: 24:00
- Language: Korean
- Label: Starship; LOEN

Monsta X chronology
The Clan Pt. 2.5: The Final Chapter (2017)	The Code (2017)	The Connect: Dejavu (2018)

Singles from The Code
- 1. "Dramarama" Released: November 7, 2017

The Code is the fifth extended play by the South Korean boy group Monsta X. It was released by Starship Entertainment and distributed by LOEN Entertainment on November 7, 2017. It consists of seven tracks, including the title track "Dramarama".

== Background and release ==
In October, Monsta X had announced the comeback, through the official SNS channel, alongside the personal photos of intense colors and visuals. In the released image, the dreamy color and close-up of each member's face were included in the background, with some sensuous typography and part of the seven logos for each member, while subsequently released the story images for each member, ahead of their comeback.

The group's comeback showcase was held at Jangchung Gymnasium in Jung District, Seoul on the same day of the comeback.

The EP was released in two versions; DE:code and Protocol Terminal.

== Critical reception ==
"Dramarama" received critical praise, alongside the music video, with Taylor Glasby of Dazed describing both of them as "intriguing and alluring", noting the music video's concept of time travel with ambiguous meaning while praising the song's ability to highlight the "individual signatures" of the group members. Writing for Rolling Stone, Kim Jae-ha added that the song's "throbbing bass line", "funky rhythms", and "searing guitars", intensified its "hypnotic incantation" effect to the listeners.

=== Listicles ===
Name of critic or publication, name of listicle, name of work and rank
Critic/Publication	List	Work	Rank	Ref.
Song
Dazed	The 20 Best K-pop Songs of 2017	"Dramarama"	10	
Rolling Stone	The 100 Greatest Songs in the History of Korean Pop Music	"Dramarama"	74	
Tone Glow	The 50 Best K-pop Songs of 2017	"Dramarama"	48	

== Commercial performance ==
As of 2022, the EP had sold over 170,000 units in South Korea. It also peaked at number one on the weekly Gaon Album Chart.

"Dramarama" debuted at number seven on the Billboard World Digital Song Sales chart upon its release while the song "From Zero" debuted at number one in 2020. It had marked the group's first-ever weekly music show win, achieving it on The Show.

== Track listing ==
The Code track listing
No.	Title	Lyrics	Music	Arrangements	Length
1.	"Dramarama"	Seo Ji-eum; Seo Jung-a; Jooheon; I.M	Andreas Öberg; Drew Ryan Scott	A-Dee; Stereo 14	3:06
2.	"Now or Never"	별들의전쟁 (Galactika); Jooheon; I.M	별들의전쟁 (Galactika)	별들의전쟁 (Galactika)	3:11
3.	"In Time"	Jooheon; Ye-Yo!	Jooheon; Ye-Yo!	Jooheon; Ye-Yo!	3:08
4.	"From Zero"	Wonho; Jooheon; I.M; Brother Su	Wonho; Rich Jang; Brother Su	Wonho; Rich Jang	3:26
5.	"X"	Oh Min-ju; Jooheon; I.M	어벤전승	어벤전승	3:46
6.	"Tropical Night" (열대야)	Jooheon; I.M; Crucial Star	Crucial Star; Kooky	Kooky	3:44
7.	"Deja Vu"	JQ (Makeumine Works); Kan Eun-yu; Kim Hye-jung (Makeumine Works); Jooheon; I.M; Choi Ji-hye	Flow Blow, JJ Evans, Shin Hyuk	Flow Blow	3:36
Total length:					24:00

== Charts ==
=== Album ===
==== Weekly charts ====
Chart performance for The Code
Chart (2017)	Peak position
French Download Albums (SNEP)	120
Japan Hot Albums (Billboard Japan)	57
Japanese Albums (Oricon)	16
South Korean Albums (Gaon)	1
US Heatseekers Albums (Billboard)	12
US World Albums (Billboard)	2

==== Monthly chart ====
Chart performance for The Code
Chart (2017)	Peak position
South Korean Albums (Gaon)	4

==== Year-end chart ====
Chart performance for The Code
Chart (2017)	Position
South Korean Albums (Gaon)	25

=== Songs ===
==== Weekly chart ====
Chart performance for "Dramarama"
Chart (2017)	Peak position
US World Digital Song Sales (Billboard)	7

Chart performance for "From Zero"
Chart (2020)	Peak position
US World Digital Song Sales (Billboard)	1

== Sales ==
Region	Sales
South Korea (Gaon)	175,902
Japan (Oricon)	5,006

== Accolades ==
Music program award for "Dramarama"
Program	Date	Ref.
The Show	November 14, 2017	

== Awards and nominations ==
Name of the award ceremony, year presented, award category, nominated work and the result of the nomination
Award ceremony	Year	Category	Nominated work	Result	Ref.
Golden Disc Awards	2018	Disc Daesang	The Code	Nominated	
Golden Disc Awards	2018	Disc Bonsang	The Code	Won	
Mnet Asian Music Awards	2018	Mwave Global Fans' Choice	"Dramarama"	Nominated	

== Release history ==
Release history and formats for The Code
Region	Date	Format	Label
South Korea	November 7, 2017	CD; digital download; streaming	Starship Entertainment; LOEN Entertainment
Various	November 7, 2017	Digital download; streaming	Starship Entertainment; LOEN Entertainment

== See also ==
- List of K-pop songs on the Billboard charts
- List of K-pop albums on the Billboard charts
- List of K-pop songs on the World Digital Song Sales chart
- List of Gaon Album Chart number ones of 2017
