= Baekho (singer) =

South Korean singer (born 1995)

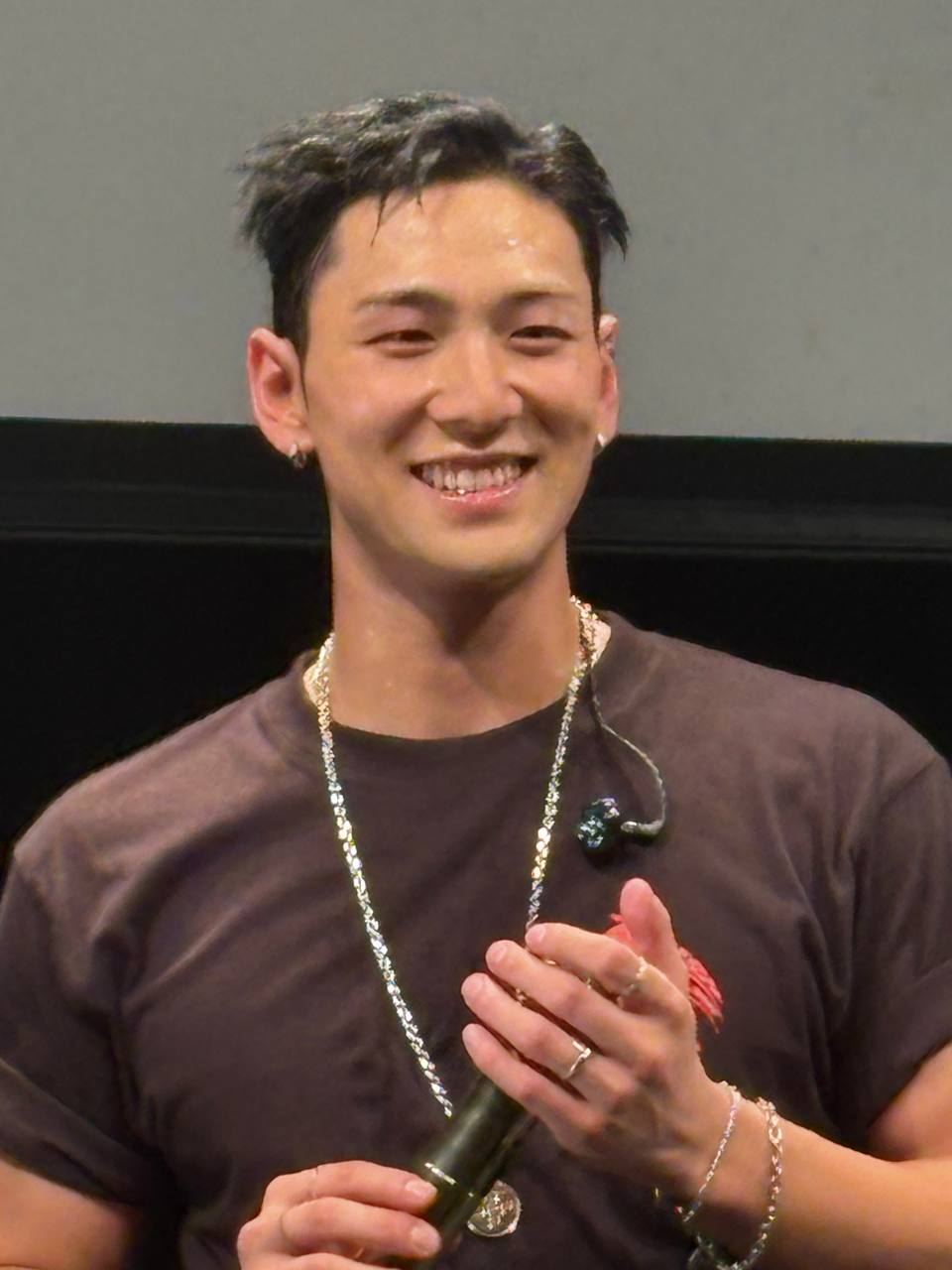
- Baekho in October 2025
- Born: Kang Dong-ho; July 21, 1995 (age 31); Jeju Province, South Korea
- Education: Paekche Institute of the Arts; Hanyang University – Institute for Future Talents
- Occupations: Singer; record producer; songwriter; musical actor; television personality
- Musical career
- Genres: K-pop; Pop
- Instruments: Vocals; Piano
- Years active: 2012–present
- Labels: Pledis (2012–2025); Prismfilter Music Group (2025–present)
- Formerly of: NU'EST; NU'EST W

Korean name
- Hangul: 강동호
- Hanja: 姜東昊
- RR: Gang Dongho
- MR: Kang Tongho

Stage name
- Hangul: 백호
- Hanja: 白虎
- RR: Baekho
- MR: Paekho

Signature
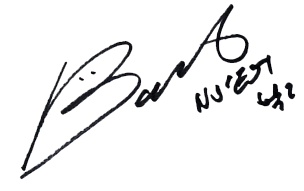

Kang Dong-ho (Korean: 강동호; born July 21, 1995), known professionally as Baekho (백호), is a South Korean singer-songwriter, record producer, and musical theatre actor. Formerly the main vocalist and music producer of South Korean boy group NU'EST, Baekho made his debut as a solo artist in October 2022 with the release of his first extended play Absolute Zero. Known for his powerhouse vocals and powerful physique, he has been dubbed the "Sexy Icon" of his generation.

== Early life and education ==
Kang Dong-ho was born on July 21, 1995 in Aewol, Jeju Province, South Korea. He has a younger brother.

He has mentioned that he originally had no intention of going into the music industry prior to being scouted, later citing Korean boy group TVXQ as his role models and musical inspiration. He graduated from Seoul Broadcasting High School, and later from the Paekche Institute of the Arts. On March 10, 2020, together with members JR, Minhyun, and Ren, he enrolled at Hanyang University Institute for Future Talents as freshmen in Practical Music Course.

== Career ==
=== Pre-debut ===
Baekho became a Pledis Entertainment trainee after being scouted by the company in 2010. He became better known after he appeared in labelmate After School's music video for the single "Play Ur Love". In 2011, he and bandmate JR appeared on the KBS talk show Hello Counselor and were revealed by After School's Kahi as two of the members of NU'EST.

Prior to his debut, Baekho made appearances in labelmates' music releases as a member of Pledis Boys. He was a backup dancer for After School Blue's "Wonder Boy", and featured in Pledis Entertainment's Christmas release "Love Letter".

=== 2012–2022: NU'EST ===
On March 15, 2012, Baekho debuted as the main vocalist of NU'EST. His stage name was chosen by labelmate Uee of After School, because of his resemblance to Slam Dunk character Hanamichi Sakuragi (known as "Kang Baek-ho" in the Korean version).

In 2013, Baekho made a cameo appearance in the television drama Jeon Woo-chi.

In early 2014, he was diagnosed with vocal fold nodules. However, he decided to continue performing with NU'EST while receiving treatment. Pledis Entertainment announced in November that he would be taking a temporary hiatus from all group activities. His doctors advised that he completely rest his voice, and he underwent vocal cord surgery. In February 2016, it was reported that he had completely recovered.

In 2015, Baekho starred in a minor supporting role in Japanese independent film Their Distance alongside NU'EST members.

Baekho began participating in song-writing and music production in 2015, with his first self-produced songs "Lost & Found" and "VVith" included in NU'EST's fourth EP Q is. He has been listed as an album producer for every NU'EST and NU'EST W release since then.

==== Produce 101 ====
In 2017, Baekho, under his real name Kang Dong-ho, participated as a contestant on Produce 101 Season 2 alongside NU'EST members JR, Minhyun and Ren. After performing a cover of BTS's "Boy in Luv" on the show, he gained the nickname of 'sexy bandit' from netizens. In the position-based challenge, he covered Blackpink's "Playing with Fire", and the view count of his fancam reached one million views within three days. He was also noted by commenters for his stable vocals in the music removed (MR) performance. His reading of the lyric 'Wow megaton bomb' also went viral, leading to a 400% increase in sales of Lotte's 'megaton bar' ice cream. Baekho eventually placed 13th and did not debut in the project group Wanna One, promoting with the remaining NU'EST members as sub-group NU'EST W from 2017 to 2018.

==== Mnet vote manipulation investigation ====
On November 18, 2020, the Seoul High Court disclosed as part of the Mnet vote manipulation investigation that Baekho was a victim of voting manipulation when he participated on Produce 101 Season 2. It was revealed by the Court that in the final episode, Baekho was directly swapped out of the group's line-up by the show's producers, who replaced him with the trainee that actually placed 13th.

Although both of the show's producers Kim Yong-bum and Ahn Joon-young alleged that Baekho requested to be removed from the final lineup of his own volition, Pledis Entertainment denied the allegations. CJ ENM (Mnet's parent company) released a statement regarding the progress of negotiations to financially compensate all the trainees who were affected by voting manipulation across all the Produce 101 programs, including Baekho. However, Pledis stated that they had not been contacted by CJ ENM regarding the compensation as of November 18, 2020.

On November 20, 2020, it was revealed that during the filming of Produce 101 Season 2, Baekho had been suffering from anxiety disorder to the point of collapsing from panic attacks, and that Ahn and the Mnet staff were aware of Baekho's diagnosis. Ahn alleged that after speaking to Baekho in May 2017 in regards to his mental health and his involvement in the show, he interpreted Baekho's responses to mean that Baekho wanted to be eliminated from the competition. However, the Court maintained that Baekho was not personally involved in the decision to have his rank manipulated, and ruled him as a victim of unfair elimination through vote manipulation.

==== Solo ventures and musical theatre debut ====
In June 2018, Baekho participated in vocal competition show King of Mask Singer, advancing to the third round. Under the mask of David Beckham, he received praise for his second-round performance of "Beautiful Night", which showed off his control over rhythm and pitch as well as his mid-to-low register, and his third-round performance of rock ballad "I Remember", which had him lauded by critics for his 'explosive' high register in addition to his emotional delivery and 'sensitivity beyond his age'.

Baekho had his first solo award show performance at the 33rd Golden Disc Awards in January 2019, singing his W, Here track "Thanksful for You", which is dedicated to his late father. In the same month, he also participated in his first original television drama soundtrack, releasing strings-based power ballad "That Day, We" for historical epic The Crowned Clown.

On January 11, 2020, Baekho held his first overseas concert "BAEKHO-liday" in Macau. The Taipei and Bangkok stops of the mini-Asia tour, intended to be held in February, were cancelled due to the Coronavirus outbreak.

Baekho was appointed ambassador for Korean Red Cross' blood donation campaign in December 2020, in an effort to alleviate the severe blood shortage crisis during the Coronavirus pandemic. Following a visit to a blood donation center, he further held gift events to encourage fans to become donors as well.

In 2021, Baekho made his musical theatre debut as the male lead Haram in the stage play Midnight Sun. The production ran from May–July 2021. He received praise for his "excellent singing skills with delicate expressive power" and "deep emotional acting" for his role.

From May 31 to June 7, Baekho hosted Power FM's radio show Youngstreet as a special DJ. In December, Baekho was selected as the MC for season 2 of Idol Challenge: Another Class, a donation-aimed variety show produced in collaboration with Good Neighbors, a non-profit organisation that focuses on children's rights around the world.

On December 19, Baekho released self-written ballad "Forevermore" as an OST track for the drama Now, We Are Breaking Up.

In December 2021, he acted in his second musical, playing boy band leader Matthew in the South Korean production of Off-Broadway concert-type musical Altar Boyz. Shortly after conclusion of Altar Boyz's run, Baekho was cast as rural plague doctor Theo in the two-hander musical Equal, receiving acclaim for his matured "delicate emotional acting" in a difficult two-person play, cementing his status as a rising star in the musical theatre scene.

=== 2022–2023: Absolute Zero, Asia tour and "Elevator" ===
It was announced on February 28, 2022, that NU'EST's exclusive contract with Pledis Entertainment will expire on March 14, 2022 and that Baekho and Minhyun have renewed their contracts with the agency while members Aron, JR, and Ren did not.

On March 21, he released punk soul song "Bite!" for KBS2 drama Crazy Love. On April 6–7 and 10, he acted as a special DJ at MBC radio show Close Friend.

From July 15 to 17, Baekho held his first fan meeting "Baekation" as a solo artist, where he performed a new unreleased song on the electric guitar; "Wanna Go Back" is later included in his debut EP.

He participated in the original soundtrack for ENA detective drama Good Job with the song "Savior", released on September 1.' He also appeared as a mission song producer on JTBC vocal survival show The Second World in October.

Baekho released his first solo EP Absolute Zero on October 12, 2022. Continuing to take the helm in record production, Baekho weaves a love story throughout the track list, capturing a relationship from its start to downfall. The EP is headed by title track "No Rules", for which he drew inspiration from his hometown Jeju's night seas, a song about liberation in love that mixes his signature bass lines with a rock sound. "No Rules" marked his successful solo debut after 11 years, topping Bugs music charts upon release.

From January to May 2023, Baekho embarked on a mini-Asia tour "BAEKHoney Day", holding concerts in Taipei, Bangkok and Seoul. A Macau stop was also announced but later postponed due to force majeure.

In May, Baekho was cast in his first television drama role, playing Cha Si-wan in My Lovely Journey.

On July 29, Baekho took part in the Plant Our Planet concert organised by the Ministry of Foreign Affairs, the Korean Forest Service, the Korean Committee for UNICEF, alongside broadcaster MBN, in an effort to raise awareness regarding the climate crisis.

On August 31, Baekho released a remake of Park Jin-young's 1995 sensational brass-powered hit "Elevator", rearranged in the style of new jack swing with an emphasis on vocals rather than rap. This release marks the start of his new digital single project "the [bæd] time", which aims to showcase his duality, with 'the bad time' representing his mature charismatic appeal and 'the bed time' his emotional inner side that contradicts with his strong exterior. "Elevator" topped Bugs real-time charts upon release, and was greatly received for its stage performances, which emphasised Baekho's sex appeal with sensual pair choreography and homage to Park's original chorus dance.

On December 7, Baekho released "What are we", the second single off his "the [bæd] time" project. A duet featuring labelmate Park Ji-won of Fromis 9, the mid-tempo song fuses pop, R&B and disco together, with lyrics flowing like a conversation to depict a blossoming mysterious relationship. Following on the success of "Elevator", "What are we" also topped Bugs real-time charts upon release.

Baekho closed his year with a heated performance of "Elevator" at the MBC Gayo Daejejeon on December 31. This was his first time attending the MBC year-end event since 2019, and his first solo year-end stage since the 2019 Golden Disc Awards.

=== 2024–present: Return to musical theatre, Waterbomb and television drama debut ===
In January 2024, Baekho made his judging panel debut on Mnet's vocal survival program Build Up: Vocal Boy Group Survival.

Baekho returned to the theatre stage to play Count Axel von Fersen in the 10th anniversary production of the musical Marie Antoinette, which ran from late February until May 2024. He received acclaim for the desperation and sensitivity conveyed in his portrayal of Fersen, and was praised for his vocal skills and delivery.

On May 8, Baekho released project single album LOVE OR DIE in collaboration with rapper Bigone, as well as a music video for the title track of the same name. The project falls musically in the rock genre, with lead single "Love or Die" being an alternative rock song. LOVE OR DIE is co-written fully by Baekho, marking his first delve into the genre. Billboard ranked "Love or Die" number 13 on their mid-year critic's picks list. Baekho and Bigone held two joint concerts "우리樂" on May 18 in support of the project album, a matinee show added following tickets selling out within a minute for the initial evening concert.

Baekho appeared as a surprise guest during Park Jin-young's set at the Weverse Con Festival on June 16, performing his rearrangement version of "Elevator" as well as covering Rain's parts in Park's 2020 hit duet "Switch to Me".

Baekho was announced to perform on five dates at Korea's representative summer music festival Waterbomb across Korea and Japan, including the main stop in Seoul on July 5. Following nationwide anticipation of his appearance, Baekho was chosen to sing the official theme song for the festival; "Wet & Wild" was released on June 1. His Seoul performance was greatly received, with local media crowning him 'Waterbomb God', 'Waterbomb Hot Guy' and 'Sexy Baek'.

Baekho received his first award as a solo artist at the 2024 K-World Dream Awards, winning the 'Best All-Round Musician Award' for his activity in music releases, festival performances, record producing and musicals.

From August, Baekho starred in KBS2's comedy mockumentary Method Club as part of the regular cast, playing himself as a passionate student who is bad at acting in the show's titular hyper-realistic acting school.

To wrap up his summer, Baekho surprise previewed a new song with rapper Jessi at his last Waterbomb performance in Yeosu on August 31. "Nutty Nutty", described as a strongly addictive song with Baekho's signature sexy aura as well as the duo's explosive energy, is later announced to be the third single of his "the [bæd] time" project, released on September 4. The single is supported by a performance video featuring dance crew Lachica's leader Gabee, of Street Woman Fighter fame, as well as dance challenges from other Street Woman Fighter leaders including Honey J, Lia Kim, Aiki and Monika. "Nutty Nutty" also topped Bugs real-time charts on day of release.

On December 21, Baekho attended the KBS Entertainment Awards, presenting the Best Challenge Award. He was originally slated to perform at the World K-Pop Festival new year's countdown on December 31, but the event was cancelled as a result of the national mourning period for the Jeju Air aviation disaster.

Baekho performed the finale stage at Taiwan's representative lunar new year's eve celebration Super Star on January 28, 2025. He then returned to the Waterbomb stage on February 22, performing his set in Manila.

On March 14, 2025, Baekho left Pledis Entertainment upon the end of his exclusive contract, after 13 years with the label. "Off-Road", written and composed by Baekho, was released on the same day in gratitude to fans; the song falls in the dance-pop genre with afrobeats and amapiano influences, containing Baekho's determination to reach the top by going off-road and forging a new path.

Baekho announced the formation of Team Baekho on April 7, 2025; his new managerial arrangement includes a label contract with long-time music collaborators PrismFilter Music Group, a partnership with RND Company for the management of his broadcasting and entertainment activities, and with RIZZCOMM for media promotion and marketing.

Baekho launched his new project "RUSH MODE" in June 2025. The project is headed by hyperpop single "RUSH", a self-composed autobiographical song looking back on past learning moments and moving forward against pressure at a new starting point of his career.

Following on last year's positive reception, Baekho was again chosen to perform at Waterbomb, taking to the stage in Seoul, Busan, Sokcho and Bali. He also performed at the K-Mega Island Festival (KMIF) and the Caribbean Bay Water Music Festival over the summer.

On July 20, he held "2025 Special Party [Rush Mode]", tickets to which were sold out within a minute. The fan-meeting is held in celebration of Baekho's 30th birthday and in support of his "RUSH MODE" project; he also performed an unreleased song from the project at the show. "Rush Mode in Tokyo" was held on October 29, marking his first concerts in Japan as a solo artist.

Baekho made his screen acting debut in Channel A drama My Lovely Journey, playing Cha Si-Wan, famed idol-turned-actor and ex-boyfriend of the female protagonist Kang Yeo-reum; the drama aired in August 2025. Baekho also led multiple television and web variety programmes in the second half of the year, including KBS Xiamen travel show Joint Travel Expense Zone, real dollar-store business variety #9700, part-time worker web-show Phantom Baekho, and tvN labour work variety Muscle Farmers.

RUSH MODE was officially released on November 12, Baekho's first project under Team Baekho. The digital single includes R&B title track "My Sign", the previously released "RUSH", and b-side "Through the Line" featuring Korean hiphop artist CAMO; Baekho has participated in the composition of all three tracks as well as lyric-writing for "RUSH".

On the morning of his mandatory military enlistment, on December 29, Baekho guested on Good Morning FM radio, marking his last live broadcasting activity ahead of 18 months of army service.

== Endorsements ==
On January 19, 2020, Baekho attended Paris Fashion Week at the invitation of British luxury fashion brand Dunhill.

For four consecutive years since September 2020, Baekho has been selected as the brand representative model for The Wood of J One Cosmetic, releasing haircare products, body wash, foam cleanser and limited perfume.

In July 2025, Baekho was announced as the new ambassador for haircare brand Treecell, which selected Baekho for his healthy and cheerful image.

Baekho collaborated with sporting goods giant Decathlon for the "Run with Decathlon x Baekho!" campaign in July 2025, which aims to promote the brand's core sport of running by encompassing music and lifestyle and through Baekho's sporty and energetic charm. His new song "RUSH" was also featured in the campaign's introductory playlist video for its 'fast-paced expression of rushing to the future to the sound of a fast-beating heart' that is akin to the 'immersive feeling and rhythm' of running. Baekho himself participated in a 3-kilometer running class on his birthday in conjunction with the campaign. He also attended the opening of Decathlon's Suwon branch on September 5.

In August 2025, Baekho was announced as the global ambassador for vegan beauty brand Vegan J, following a four-year stint as the face of cosmetics brand The Wood under the same parent company; he was chosen as his 'healthy and warm image' aligns with the brand's naturalistic philosophy.

== Personal life ==
Baekho is a skilled haedong kumdo practitioner, having reached sam dan rank (third-degree black belt) in his seven years of training during school days. He has also placed first in international kumdo competitions. His kumdo skills are showcased in the teaser video that first introduced him as a member of NU'EST in 2012.

Baekho has struggled with weight since early in his career, and turned to exercise to lose weight instead of dieting, earning him a reputation of being a "fit idol." He has been nicknamed 'Human Benz' by Korean netizens due to resemblance of his chest muscles to the car brand's logo. His thigh circumference once measured up to 25 inches. During NU'EST's appearance in Idol Room in 2019, Baekho succeeded in carrying all four members on his back unaided. After a fan sent a photo of him in a gym to Men's Health Korea, the editorial team invited him to be the cover of the magazine's November 2018 issue. He once again covered the magazine in January 2020.

He enjoys exercise and sports in his free time, including football and golfing. He is also a licensed free diver, and can hold his breath underwater for up to three minutes.

He also enjoys spending time with horses and horse-riding in his hometown in Jeju, having sponsored the rescue of four former racehorses at a shelter centre.

=== Sexual harassment allegations ===
In June 2017, a former acquaintance alleged anonymously online that in 2009, when she and Baekho were both in middle school, she had been molested by him on the bus on their way home from cram school. She pressed charges against Baekho later that month, while Pledis denied the allegations and filed a counter suit in response. Pledis also filed a complaint against the accuser for violating the laws on information communication network and information protection. The police forwarded the case to prosecutors in September 2017.

On April 16, 2018, the Seoul Central District Prosecutors' Office cleared Baekho of the sexual assault charges, and have since dismissed the case. Baekho was ultimately found not guilty and was acquitted of all charges. The case was also raised to the Korea Communications Commission over the fairness of how the allegations were reported.

=== Military service ===
Baekho enlisted in the South Korean army as an active duty soldier on December 29, 2025 to fulfill his mandatory military service. He performed for Ground Forces Festival (also known as Army Fest), held in Gyeryong, South Chungcheong Province, on October 1–5, 2026.

== Discography ==
=== Extended plays ===
List of extended plays, showing selected details, selected chart positions, and sales figures
Title	Details	Peak chart positions	Sales
Title	Details	KOR	Sales
Absolute Zero	Released: October 12, 2022; Label: Pledis; Formats: CD, digital download, streaming; Track listing: 1. "Festival in My Car"; 2. "Love Burn"; 3. "No Rules"; 4. "We Don't Care No More" (feat. June One of Glen Check); 5. "Bad 4 U"; 6. "변했다고 느끼는 내가 변한 건지" (Wanna Go Back) (feat. Sik-K)	9	KOR: 83,220

=== Singles ===
List of singles, with selected chart positions, showing year released, sales, and album name
Title	Year	Peak chart positions		Sales	Album
Title	Year	KOR		Sales	Album
Title	Year	Circle	Hot (Note: The Kpop Hot 100 was launched on August 25, 2011 and was discontinued on July 16, 2014. The chart was re-established on June 4, 2017, but was discontinued on April 30, 2022.)	Sales	Album
As lead artist
"No Rules"	2022	— (Note: "No Rules" did not enter the Circle Digital Chart, but peaked at number 15 and 26 on Circle Download Chart and Circle BGM Chart, respectively.)	—	—N/a	Absolute Zero
"Elevator"	2023	— (Note: "Elevator" did not enter the Circle Digital Chart, but peaked at number 20 and 71 on Circle Download Chart and Circle BGM Chart, respectively.)	—	—N/a	Non-album singles
"What are We" (featuring Park Ji-won of Fromis 9)	2023	— (Note: "What are We" did not enter the Circle Digital Chart, but peaked at number 6 and 30 on Circle Download Chart and Circle BGM Chart, respectively.)	—	—N/a	Non-album singles
"Love or Die" (featuring Bigone)	2024	—	—	—N/a	Love or Die
"Wet & Wild"	2024	—	—	—N/a	Non-album singles
"Nutty Nutty" (featuring Jessi)	2024	—	—	—N/a	Non-album singles
"Off-Road"	2025	—	—	—N/a	Non-album singles
"Rush"	2025	—	—	—N/a	Rush Mode
"My Sign"	2025	—	—	—N/a	Rush Mode
As featured artist
"Love Letter" (Son Dam-bi, After School featuring Ara, Hyelim, Minhyun, Junghyun)	2011	37	43	KOR: 398,062	Happy Pledis 2nd Album
"—" denotes a recording that did not chart or was not released in that region.

=== Soundtrack appearances ===
List of soundtrack appearances, with selected chart positions, showing year released, and album name
Title	Year	Peak chart positions	Album
Title	Year	KOR	Album
"That Day, We" (그날, 우리)	2019	— (Note: "That Day, We" did not enter the Gaon Digital Chart, but peaked at number 12 and 59 on Gaon BGM Chart and Gaon Download Chart, respectively.)	The Crowned Clown OST Part 2
"Meet Me When the Sun Goes Down" (태양이 지면 널 만나러 갈게)	2021	— (Note: "Meet Me When the Sun Goes Down" did not enter the Gaon Digital Chart, but peaked at number 19 and 54 on Gaon Download Chart and Gaon BGM Chart, respectively.)	Midnight Sun OST Part 3
"Good-Bye Days" (with Kei)	2021	— (Note: "Good-Bye Days" did not enter the Gaon Digital Chart, but peaked at number 76 on Gaon Download Chart.)	Midnight Sun OST Part 3
"Forevermore" (나는 너라서)	2021	— (Note: "Forevermore" did not enter the Gaon Digital Chart, but peaked at number 7 and 20 on Gaon Download Chart and Gaon BGM Chart, respectively.)	Now, We Are Breaking Up OST Part 10
"Bite!" (물어!)	2022	— (Note: "Bite" did not enter the Gaon Digital Chart, but peaked at number 68 on Gaon Download Chart.)	Crazy Love OST Part 3
"Savior"	2022	— (Note: "Savior" did not enter the Circle Digital Chart, but peaked at number 88 and 93 on Circle BGM Chart and Circle Download Chart, respectively.)	Good Job OST Part 2
"—" denotes a recording that did not chart or was not released in that region.

=== Compilation appearances ===
List of compilation appearances, showing year released, chart positions, and album name
Title	Year	Peak chart positions	Album
Title	Year	KOR	Album
"Beautiful Night" (아름다운 밤이야) (Beast cover)	2018	—	Masked Singer 160th (Live Version)
"Thought" (생각이나) (Boohwal cover)	2018	—	Masked Singer 160th (Live Version)
"Bastard" (놈놈놈) (with Yoon Min-soo, Cheetah)	2019	171	The Call 2
"Don't Worry" (건강하고 아프지마요) (with Yoon Min-soo, Cheetah, Song Ga-in)	2019	— (Note: "Don't Worry" did not enter the Gaon Digital Chart, but peaked at number 31 and 34 on Gaon BGM Chart and Gaon Download Chart, respectively.)	The Call 2
"—" denotes a recording that did not chart or was not released in that region.

=== Other charted songs ===
List of other charted songs, with selected chart positions, showing year released, sales, and album name
Title	Year	Peak chart positions		Sales	Album
Title	Year	KOR		Sales	Album
Title	Year	Circle	Hot	Sales	Album
"Thanksful For You" (지금까지 행복했어요)	2017	25	9	KOR: 74,042	W, Here
"Feels"	2018	— (Note: "Feels" did not enter the Gaon Digital Chart, but peaked at number 32 and 99 on Gaon Download Chart and Gaon BGM Chart, respectively.)	—	—N/a	Wake, N
"Need It"	2021	— (Note: "Need It" did not enter the Gaon Digital Chart, but peaked at number 24 and 131 on Gaon Download Chart and Gaon BGM Chart, respectively.)	—	—N/a	Romanticize
"Festival in My Car"	2022	— (Note: "Festival in My Car" did not enter the Circle Digital Chart, but peaked at number 54 and 161 on Circle Download Chart and Circle BGM Chart, respectively.)	—	—N/a	Absolute Zero
"Love Burn"	2022	— (Note: "Love Burn" did not enter the Circle Digital Chart, but peaked at number 52 and 153 on Circle Download Chart and Circle BGM Chart, respectively.)	—N/a	—N/a	Absolute Zero
"We Don't Care No More" (featuring June One of Glen Check)	2022	— (Note: "We Don't Care No More" did not enter the Circle Digital Chart, but peaked at number 57 on Circle Download Chart.)	—N/a	—N/a	Absolute Zero
"Bad 4 U"	2022	— (Note: "Bad 4 U" did not enter the Circle Digital Chart, but peaked at number 56 and 198 on Circle Download Chart and Circle BGM Chart, respectively.)	—N/a	—N/a	Absolute Zero
"Wanna Go Back" (변했다고 느끼는 내가 변한 건지) (featuring Sik-K)	2022	— (Note: "Wanna Go Back" did not enter the Circle Digital Chart, but peaked at number 58 and 182 on Circle Download Chart and Circle BGM Chart, respectively.)	—N/a	—N/a	Absolute Zero
"—" denotes a recording that did not chart or was not released in that region.

=== Songwriting credits ===
Year	Album	Artist	Song	Lyrics		Music	
Year	Album	Artist	Song	Credited	With	Credited	With
2015	Good Life	Bumzu	"I Need You" (YA해)	Yes	Bumzu	No	—N/a
2016	Q is	NU'EST	"Lost & Found" (나의 천국)	Yes	JR	Yes	Bumzu; Park Gi-tae; Lee Ki-young
2016	Q is	NU'EST	"VVith" (사실 말야)	Yes	Bumzu; Minhyun; JR	Yes	Bumzu
2016	Canvas	NU'EST	"R.L.T.L (Real Love True Love) (One Morning)"	Yes	Bumzu; Minhyun; JR	No	—N/a
2016	Canvas	NU'EST	"Love Paint (Every Afternoon)"	Yes	Minhyun; JR; Ren; Aron; Bumzu	No	—N/a
2016	Canvas	NU'EST	"Look (A Starlight Night)"	Yes	Bumzu; Minhyun; JR	No	—N/a
2017	W, Here	NU'EST W	"My Beautiful" (하루만)	Yes	JR; Bumzu	Yes	Bumzu
2017	W, Here	NU'EST W	"Where You At"	Yes	JR; Bumzu	Yes	Bumzu; Royal Dive
2017	W, Here	Aron	"Good Love"	Yes	Aron; Bumzu	Yes	Bumzu; Curtis F
2017	27	Bumzu	"How u doin'"	Yes	Lee Yoo Jung	No	
2018	To. Day	Fromis 9	"DKDK" (두근두근) (Note: Credited as Bbaekkom (빼꼼).)	Yes	Baekgom	No	—N/a
2018	Who, You	NU'EST W	"Signal"	Yes	JR; Bumzu	Yes	Bumzu; Royal Dive
2018	Who, You	NU'EST W	"Dejavu"	Yes	JR; Bumzu	Yes	Bumzu
2018	Who, You	NU'EST W	"Polaris" (북극성)	Yes	JR; Bumzu	Yes	Bumzu
2018	Who, You	NU'EST W	"Ylenol"	Yes	JR; Bumzu	No	—N/a
2018	Who, You	NU'EST W	"Gravity & Moon" (중력달)	Yes	JR; Bumzu	Yes	Bumzu; Royal Dive
2018	Who, You	NU'EST W	"Shadow"	Yes	JR; Bumzu	Yes	Bumzu; Park Gi-tae (Prismfilter)
2018	Produce 48 – Final (Note: "We Together" was later re-recorded by the winning contestants of Produce 48, Iz*One, on their extended play Color*Iz.)	Produce 48 contestants	"We Together" (앞으로 잘 부탁해)	Yes	Baekgom	No	—N/a
2018	Non-album single	NU'EST W	"I Don't Care (with Spoonz)"	Yes	JR; Ren; Aron	Yes	—N/a
2018	Wake, N	NU'EST W	"L.I.E"	Yes	JR; Bumzu	Yes	Bumzu
2018	Wake, N	NU'EST W	"Help Me"	Yes	JR; Bumzu	Yes	Bumzu
2018	Wake, N	Aron	"Wi-Fi"	Yes	Aron; Bumzu	Yes	Bumzu; Daehan
2018	Wake, N	Ren	"You & I" (나, 너에게)	No	—N/a	Yes	Ren; Bumzu; Park Gi-tae
2018	Wake, N	Baekho	"Feels"	Yes	Bumzu	Yes	Bumzu; Park Gi-tae
2019	Non-album single	NU'EST	"A Song For You" (노래 제목)	Yes	Minhyun; JR; Ren; Aron	No	—N/a
2019	Happily Ever After	NU'EST	"Segno"	Yes	JR; Bumzu	Yes	Bumzu; Park Gi-tae
2019	Happily Ever After	NU'EST	"Bet Bet"	Yes	JR; Bumzu	Yes	Bumzu; Royal Dive
2019	Happily Ever After	NU'EST	"Bass"	Yes	JR; Bumzu	Yes	Bumzu
2019	Happily Ever After	NU'EST	"Talk About Love"	Yes	JR; Bumzu	Yes	Bumzu
2019	Happily Ever After	NU'EST	"Different"	Yes	JR; Bumzu	Yes	Bumzu; Park Gi-tae
2019	Happily Ever After	NU'EST	"Fine"	Yes	JR; Bumzu	Yes	Bumzu
2019	The Table	NU'EST	"Call Me Back"	Yes	JR; Bumzu	Yes	Bumzu; Park Gi-tae; Aaron Fresh; Jo Michael (Singing Beetle)
2019	The Table	NU'EST	"Love Me"	Yes	JR; Bumzu	Yes	Bumzu; Park Gi-tae
2019	The Table	NU'EST	"One Two Three"	Yes	Minhyun; JR; Bumzu	Yes	Bumzu; Anchor
2019	The Table	NU'EST	"Trust Me"	Yes	JR; Bumzu	Yes	Bumzu
2019	The Table	NU'EST	"Stay Up All Night" (밤새)	Yes	JR; Bumzu	Yes	Bumzu; Park Gi-tae
2019	The Table	NU'EST	"If We" (우리가 사랑했다면)	Yes	Bumzu	Yes	Bumzu
2020	Non-album single	NU'EST	"Let's Love (with Spoonz)"	Yes	Minhyun; JR; Ren; Aron; Bumzu	Yes	Bumzu; Park Gi-tae; BuildingOwner
2020	The Nocturne	NU'EST	"I'm in Trouble"	Yes	Bumzu	Yes	Bumzu
2020	The Nocturne	NU'EST	"Firework"	Yes	JR; Bumzu; doubletenboy	Yes	Bumzu; Nmore (Prismfilter)
2020	The Nocturne	NU'EST	"Back To Me"(평행우주)	Yes	Seo Ji-eum; Bumzu	Yes	Bumzu; Anchor (Prismfilter)
2020	The Nocturne	NU'EST	"꼭"(Must)	Yes	Ren; Bumzu	Yes	Ren; Bumzu
2020	The Nocturne	NU'EST	"반딧별"(Shooting Star)	Yes	JR; Bumzu	Yes	Bumzu; Anchor (Prismfilter); Bir$day (Prismfilter)
2020	Non-album single	NU'EST	"Best Summer (with Spoonz)"	Yes	Bumzu	Yes	Bumzu; Ohway! (Prismfilter); Jozu (Prismfilter)
2020	Drive (Japan Album)	NU'EST	"Drive"	Yes	JR; Bumzu	Yes	Bumzu; Ohway! (Prismfilter)
2021	Romanticize	NU'EST	"Dress"	Yes	Jay&Rudy; Glenn (Prismfilter)	Yes	Bumzu; Jay&Rudy; Building Owner(Prismfilter)
2021	Romanticize	NU'EST	"Inside Out"	Yes	JR; Bumzu; G-High (MonoTree); Innerchild (MonoTree); Jay&Rudy	Yes	Bumzu; Anchor(Prismfilter); G-High (MonoTree)
2021	Romanticize	NU'EST	"Don't Wanna Go"	Yes	Bumzu	Yes	Bumzu; Park Gi-tae(Prismfilter)
2021	Romanticize	NU'EST	"Black"	Yes	JR; Bumzu; Glenn(Prismfilter)	Yes	Bumzu; Corey K (The Yoo Group)
2021	Romanticize	NU'EST	"Drive"(Korean Ver.)	Yes	JR; Bumzu	Yes	Bumzu; Ohway!(Prismfilter)
2021	Romanticize	Baekho	"Need It"	Yes	Bumzu	Yes	Bumzu; Anchor (Prismfilter)
2021	Romanticize	Aron	"I'm Not"	Yes	Aron; Glenn (Prismfilter)	No	—N/a
2021	Now, We Are Breaking Up OST	Baekho	"Forevermore"	Yes	—N/a	No	—N/a
2022	Needle & Bubble	NU'EST	"Love Paint (Every Afternoon)" (re-mastering)	Yes	Mafly; Minhyun; JR; Ren; Aron; Bumzu	No	—N/a
2022	Needle & Bubble	NU'EST	"Bet Bet" (re-mastering)	Yes	JR; Bumzu	Yes	Bumzu; Royal Dive
2022	Needle & Bubble	NU'EST	"Love Me" (re-mastering)	Yes	JR; Bumzu	Yes	Bumzu; Park Gi-tae; Nmore
2022	Needle & Bubble	NU'EST	"Different" (re-mastering)	Yes	JR; Bumzu	Yes	Bumzu; Park Gi-tae
2022	Needle & Bubble	NU'EST	"Look (A Starlight Night)" (Alternative house version)	Yes	Minhyun; JR; Bumzu	No	—N/a
2022	Needle & Bubble	NU'EST	"I'm in Trouble" (Urban version)	Yes	Bumzu	Yes	Bumzu
2022	Needle & Bubble	NU'EST	"Galaxy"	Yes	Bumzu	Yes	Bumzu; Park Gi-Tae; Jay&Rudy
2022	Needle & Bubble	NU'EST	"다시, 봄"(Again)	Yes	Bumzu; Elum	Yes	Bumzu; Gesture; Elum
2022	The Second World	Exy	"Burinake" (Latin version) (부리나케)	Yes	BuildingOwner; Elum; Exy	Yes	BuildingOwner; Elum; Hey Farmer; Ohway!; SUMMER CAKE
2022	The Second World	Kim Seon-you	"Burinake" (Newtro version) (부리나케)	Yes	BuildingOwner; Elum	Yes	BuildingOwner; Elum; Hey Farmer
2022	Absolute Zero	Baekho	"Festival in My Car"	Yes	Bumzu; Glenn; Nmore	Yes	Bumzu; Glenn; Nmore; Ohway!; Hong Hoon-Gi
2022	Absolute Zero	Baekho	"Love Burn"	Yes	Bumzu; Jenci	No	—N/a
2022	Absolute Zero	Baekho	"No Rules"	Yes	Bumzu; Lee Seu-Ran; Krysta Marie Youngs; Howard Fleetwood	Yes	Bumzu; Glenn; Nmore; Krysta Marie Youngs; Howard Fleetwood
2022	Absolute Zero	Baekho	"Bad 4 U"	Yes	Bumzu; Gesture; Alex Karlsson	No	—N/a
2022	Absolute Zero	Baekho	"변했다고 느끼는 내가 변한 건지 (Feat. Sik-K)" (Wanna Go Back)	Yes	Bumzu; Sik-K; Elum; Glenn; Nmore; BuildingOwner	Yes	Bumzu; Sik-K; Glenn; Nmore; Ohway!; Hong Hoon-Gi
2024	LOVE OR DIE	Baekho & BIGONE	"사랑하기 때문인거야" (All Because I Love You)	No	—N/a	Yes	Bigone; Ohway!; Hungi Hong
2024	LOVE OR DIE	Baekho & BIGONE	"Love or Die"	No	—N/a	Yes	Bigone; Ohway!; Hungi Hong
2024	LOVE OR DIE	Baekho & BIGONE	"Oh My Best Day"	No	—N/a	Yes	Bigone; Ohway!
2024	LOVE OR DIE	Baekho & BIGONE	"Love or Die" (EDM version)	No	—N/a	Yes	Bigone; Ohway!
2024	LOVE OR DIE	Baekho & BIGONE	"Love or Die" (Unplugged version)	No	—N/a	Yes	Bigone; Ohway!
2024	Non-album single	Baekho	"Nutty Nutty (Feat. Jessi)"	Yes	BUMZU; Shannon; Tobias Näslund; Arineh Karimi; Linnea Södahl	No	—N/a
2025	Non-album single	Baekho	"Off-Road"	Yes	Kohway; Jin Jeon; BuildingOwner	Yes	BuildingOwner; Jin Jeon; Kohway
2025	3 in the City	Bangtan Pink	"G.T.A (Good Time Ahead) (Feat. Baekho)" (내일, 내게 갈게)	Yes	Kim Hyejung; Park Gi-tae	No	—N/a
2025	Non-album single	JAESSBEE	"My Summer Manual" (나의 여름 설명서)	Yes	Bumzu; Shannon Bae; Jenny Jeon; Kim Hyejung; Elum; J Square; Gabee; Seungheon	No	—N/a
2025	RUSH MODE	Baekho	"Rush"	Yes	Shannon Bae	Yes	Cesar Peralta
2025	RUSH MODE	Baekho	"My Sign"	No	—N/a	Yes	Park Gi-tae; Glenn
2025	RUSH MODE	Baekho	"Through the Line (Feat. CAMO)"	No	—N/a	Yes	Jin Jeon; CAMO; Alex Karlsson

== Filmography ==
=== Films ===
Year	Title	Role	Notes	Ref.
2015	Their Distance	Ji-woo's friend	Japanese film	

=== Television series ===
Year	Title	Role	Notes	Ref.
2013	Jeon Woo-chi	Jang Won	Cameo	
2025	My Lovely Journey	Cha Si-Wan		

=== Television shows ===
Year	Title	Role	Notes	Ref.
2017	Produce 101 Season 2	Contestant		
2018	King of Mask Singer	Contestant	Episodes 159–160	
2018	Hidden Singer 5	Panelist	Episode 8 (with Aron and Ren)	
2018	Battle Trip	Contestant	Episodes 108–109 (with JR)	
2018	Produce 48	Music producer	Episode 12 (Finale)	
2019	Law of the Jungle	Cast member	Episodes 353–357	
2019	The Call	Cast member	Season 2	
2019	Let's Go, Man Soo Ro	Cast member		
2021	Law of the Jungle	Cast member	Episodes 446–448	
2022	YTN NewsLIVE	One-day Weathercaster		
2022	The Second World	Mission music producer	Episode 6	
2022	Hidden Singer 7	Panelist	Episode 9	
2022	Buddy Boys	Cast member		
2023	Teachers of Narat 2: The Korean Wave Teacher Expedition	Cast member		
2023	Battle Trip	Contestant	Episodes 32–33 (with Nichkhun)	
2023	R U Next?	Special coach	Episodes 2–3	
2023	Star Eat-Show	MC	Season 2	
2023	The Travelog		Episode 5	
2024	Build Up: Vocal Boy Group Survival	Judge		
2024	Method Club	Regular cast		
2024	The Ddanddara	Special Master	Episodes 1 & 3	
2025	Boys II Planet	Special Master / Planet Master	Episodes 6–7 & 10	
2025	King of Mask Singer	Panelist	Episodes 510–511	
2025	Joint Travel Expense Zone	Regular cast		
2025	Muscle Farmers	Cast Member		

=== Web shows ===
Year	Title	Role	Notes	Ref.
2021–2023	Idol Challenge: Another Class	MC	Season 2	
2022	The Door: To Wonderland	Cast member	Season 1–2	
2022–2023	BAEK-HOpping	Self	Original YouTube content	
2023	Idol Departure Dream Team	MC	Season 2	
2023	Idol Truck	Cast member	Busan team	
2023	Baekho Grylls	Self	Original YouTube content	
2025	#9700	Cast member		
2025	Phantom Baekho	MC		

== Musical theatre ==
Year	Title	Role	Ref.
2021	Midnight Sun	Haram	
2021	Altar Boyz	Matthew	
2022	Equal	Theo	
2024	Marie Antoinette	Count Axel von Fersen	

== Awards and nominations ==
Name of the award ceremony, year presented, category, nominee of the award, and the result of the nomination
Award ceremony	Year	Category	Nominee / Work	Result	Ref.
KBS Entertainment Awards	2019	Hot Issue Entertainer Award	Let's Go, Man Soo Ro	Won	
K-World Dream Awards	2024	Best All-Round Musician Award	Baekho	Won	

== Concert and tours ==
Year	Concert / Tour / Fan Meeting	Date	Venue	Notes
2018	Happy Baekho Day Busking Live	July 21	Olympic Park 88 Waterside Stage, Seoul	Birthday event
2019	Baekho's Birthday Talk Live	July 18	Olympic Park 88 Waterside Stage, Seoul	Birthday event
2020	Baekho-liday	January 11	Broadway Theatre, Macau	
2020	Baekho-liday	February 14 (Cancelled)	NTU Sports Center, Taipei, Taiwan	Due to the coronavirus pandemic
2020	Baekho-liday	February 16 (Postponed)	MCC Hall, The Mall Bangkapi, Bangkok, Thailand	Due to the coronavirus pandemic
2021	BAEKHOn21	July 22	Online	Birthday event
2022	Baekation	July 15 – 17	Yes24 Live Hall, Seoul	Fan Meeting
2023 – 2024	BAEKHoney Day	January 28, 2023	Taipei International Convention Center, Taipei, Taiwan	
2023 – 2024	BAEKHoney Day	February 4, 2023	Union Hall 2, Union Mall, Bangkok, Thailand	
2023 – 2024	BAEKHoney Day	March 25, 2023 (Postponed, new date TBA)	Broadway Theatre, Macau	
2023 – 2024	BAEKHoney Day	May 12–14, 2023	Yes24 Live Hall, Seoul	
2023 – 2024	BAEKHoney Day	April 20, 2024	Zepp New Taipei, Taipei, Taiwan	
2025	Rush Mode	July 20	Hyundai Card Understage, Seoul	
2025	Rush Mode	October 29	Asakusa Kagekijo Theater, Tokyo, Japan	
