= Armed Forces Day (South Korea) =

Annual event in South Korea

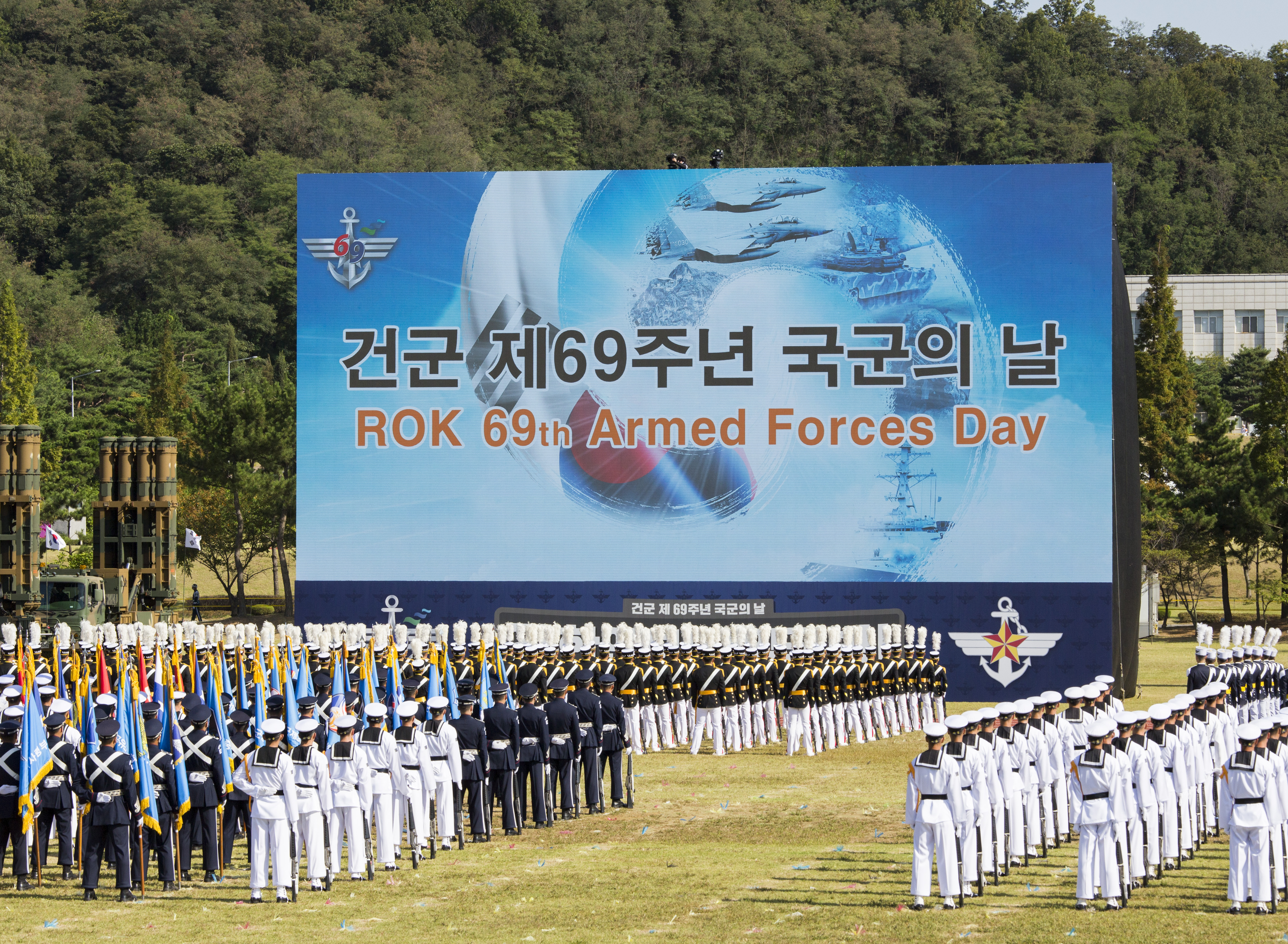
- 69th anniversary of the Armed Forces Day in 2017.
- Observed by: South Korea
- Date: October 1st
- Next time: 1 October 2026
- Frequency: annual

- Armed Forces Day
- Hangul: 국군의 날
- Hanja: 國軍의 날
- RR: Gukgunui nal
- MR: Kukkunŭi nal

Armed Forces Day (Korean: 국군의 날) in South Korea is an annual event usually celebrated on 1 October to commemorate the service of men and women in the Republic of Korea Armed Forces. The day that South Korean forces broke through the 38th parallel in 1950 during the Korean War. It is not a national holiday or public day off, but a National Flag Raising Day (국기게양일) to recognize and honor the Republic of Korea Armed Forces. In 2017, the holiday was celebrated on 28 September rather than the usual date to avoid clashing with the lunar holiday of Chuseok. Similarly, in 2023 the military parade was held ahead of the holiday, it would be the first of what is now once more a yearly tradition.
