= Needle & Bubble =

- Digital cover

Compilation album by NU'EST
- Released: March 15, 2022
- Genre: K-pop
- Length: 32:56
- Labels: Pledis; YG Plus
- Producers: Baekho; Bumzu

NU'EST chronology
Romanticize (2021)	Needle & Bubble (2022)

Singles from Needle & Bubble
- 1. "Again" Released: March 15, 2022

Needle & Bubble is the first and only compilation album by South Korean boy band NU'EST. It was released on March 15, 2022, through Pledis Entertainment. The ten-track album comprises remastered and alternative versions of previously released songs, including the lead single "Again". The album is the band's final release prior to the expiration of their ten-year contract with Pledis and simultaneous disbandment in March 2022.

== Track listing ==
Needle & Bubble track listing
No.	Title	Lyrics	Music	Arrangements	Length
1.	"Hello" (여보세요; re-mastering)	Son Ju-yeong	Son Ju-yeong; Hyun Jae-wook; Kim Tae-hoon; Shiwoo	Hyun Jae-wook; Kim Tae-hoon; Ho Gi-sung	3:29
2.	"Overcome" (여왕의 기사; re-mastering)	Bumzu; JR; Maxx Song; Kim Eun-su; Mafly; Denis Seo	Bumzu; Maxx Song; Bum	Bum	3:13
3.	"Love Paint (Every Afternoon)" (re-mastering)	Mafly; Baekho; Minhyun; JR; Ren; Aron; Bumzu	Bumzu; Royal Dive	Royal Dive; 220	3:07
4.	"Bet Bet" (re-mastering)	Baekho; JR; Bumzu	Bumzu; Baekho; Royal Dive	Royal Dive	3:21
5.	"Love Me" (re-mastering)	Baekho; JR; Bumzu	Bumzu; Baekho; Park Gi-tae; Nmore	Bumzu; Park Gi-tae; Nmore	3:02
6.	"Different" (re-mastering)	Baekho; JR; Bumzu	Bumzu; Baekho; Park Gi-tae	Park Gi-tae	3:09
7.	"Look (A Starlight Night)" (alternative house version)	Baekho; Minhyun; JR; Bumzu	Bumzu; Royal Dive	Royal Dive; 220; Ohway!	3:51
8.	"I'm in Trouble" (urban version)	Baekho; Bumzu	Bumzu; Baekho	Bumzu; Baekho; Anchor; Ohway!	3:06
9.	"Galaxy"	Baekho; Bumzu	Bumzu; Baekho; Park Gi-tae; Jay&Judy	Park Gi-tae	3:12
10.	"Again" (다시, 봄)	Baekho; Bumzu; Elum	Bumzu; Baekho; Gesture; Elum	Bumzu; Park Gi-tae; Ohway!	3:26
Total length:					32:50

== Charts ==
=== Weekly charts ===
Weekly chart performance for Needle & Bubble
Chart (2022)	Peak position
Japanese Albums (Oricon)	48
South Korean Albums (Gaon)	6

=== Monthly charts ===
Monthly chart performance for Needle & Bubble
Chart (2022)	Peak position
South Korean Albums (Gaon)	14
