= Hwang Chi-yeul =

South Korean singer

Hwang Chiyeul
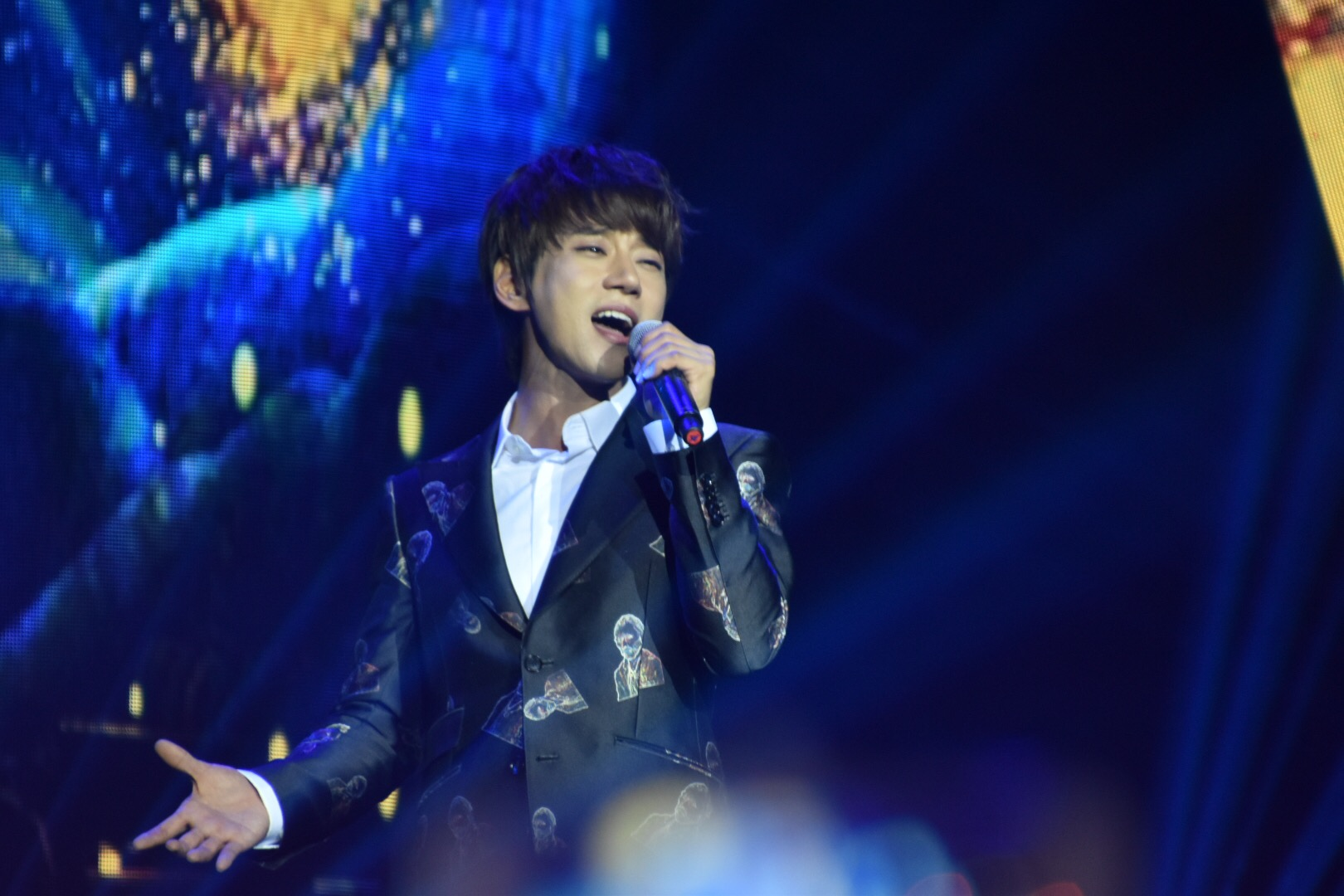
- Hwang in Shenzhen in June 2016

Background information
- Also known as: Ten2
- Born: December 3, 1982 (age 43); Gumi, North Gyeongsang, South Korea
- Genres: K-pop; C-pop
- Occupations: Singer; songwriter; TV host
- Instruments: Vocals; piano; guitar
- Years active: 2007–present
- Label: TEN2 Entertainment
- Website: Official website,

Korean name
- Hangul: 황치열
- Hanja: 黃致列
- RR: Hwang Chiyeol
- MR: Hwang Ch'iyŏl

Hwang Chiyeul (Korean: 황치열; Hanja: 黃致列; born 3 December 1982) is a South Korean singer. Outside his career as a solo artist, he has also hosted Immortal Songs 2 and competed in the Chinese version of singing competition show I Am a Singer. He made his official debut in 2007, releasing a digital single album, Chi Yeul (치열) and a full-length studio album, Five Senses (오감).

In March 2015, he appeared on I Can See Your Voice on Mnet Korea. His success on the show became the turning point in his life, and since then he has appeared on other TV shows such as Immortal Songs: Singing the Legend, Radio Star, I Live Alone, Knowing Bros, Happy Together. Hunan TV in China invited him to participate in I Am a Singer (season 4). On 13 June 2017, his first mini album, Be Ordinary was released and it led him to be the best selling solo artist in the first half of the year.

== Early life ==
Hwang was born and grew up in Gumi, North Gyeongsang Province in South Korea on 3 December 1982, the youngest of three children born to Hwang, an engineer and Park. As a teenager, he was obsessed with dancing (B-boying), but he always wanted to become a singer. On September 24, 2004, he moved to Seoul to become a musician. In 2007, he made his official debut, releasing two albums and appearing in some TV and radio shows for about a year, but his career came to a halt because his management company closed. He spent his twenties working part-time jobs and taught at music schools as a vocal coach, teaching idol bands including Infinite, After School, Lovelyz, NU'EST, and Hello Venus. Since he appeared on I Can See Your Voice on Mnet in 2015, he has been one of the most active Korean celebrities as singer, host of TV-shows and awards, guest on various TV-shows, advertising model, brand ambassador.

== Discography ==
=== Studio albums ===
Title	Album details	Peak chart positions	Sales
Title	Album details	KOR	Sales
Korean
Five Senses	Released: June 5, 2007; Label: Cooking Music; Formats: CD	—	—N/a
The Four Seasons	Released: January 21, 2019; Label: How Entertainment; Formats: CD, digital download	2	KOR: 105,227
All of Me	Released: February 27, 2025; Label: Ten2 Entertainment; Formats: CD, digital download	24	KOR: 18,235
Chinese
Chi-yeul. Love	Released: December 25, 2017; Label: Guoyun Culture; Formats: CD, digital download	—	CHN: 1,200,000+
"—" denotes album did not chart or was not released in that region.

=== Extended plays ===
Title	EP details	Peak chart positions	Sales
Title	EP details	KOR	Sales
Be Ordinary	Released: June 13, 2017; Label: How Entertainment; Formats: CD, digital download	1	KOR: 224,071
Be Myself	Released: April 24, 2018; Label: How Entertainment; Formats: CD, digital download	1	KOR: 115,383
Be My Reason	Released: April 2, 2021; Label: TEN2 Entertainment; Formats: CD, digital download	4	KOR: 99,509
By My Side	Released: May 12, 2022; Label: TEN2 Entertainment; Formats: CD, digital download	3	KOR: 53,481
Gift	Released: June 1, 2023; Label: TEN2 Entertainment; Formats: CD, digital download	15	KOR: 30,534
I Love Winter	Released: December 11, 2023; Label: TEN2 Entertainment; Formats: CD, digital download	4	KOR: 20,004
I Love Summer	Released: June 29, 2026; Label: TEN2 Entertainment; Formats: CD, digital download	30	KOR: 6,022

=== Singles ===
Title	Year	Peak chart positions			Sales (DL)	Album
Title	Year	KOR Circle	KOR Hot 100	CHN V Chart	Sales (DL)	Album
Korean
"Just Once" (한번만)	2007	—N/a	—N/a	—N/a	—N/a	Five Senses
"A Man From Gyeongsang-do" (경상도남자)	2014	—	—N/a	—	—N/a	Non-album singles
"Holding The End of This Night" (이 밤의 끝을 잡고) with LeeSa	2015	—	—N/a	—	—N/a	Non-album singles
"The First Time I Met You" (너를 처음 만난 그때) with Baek A-yeon	2015	49	—N/a	—	KOR: 51,089+	Two Yoo Project Sugar Man
"Without You" (너 없이 못 살아)	2016	80	—N/a	—	KOR: 28,265+	Non-album single
"Firefly" (반딧불이) with Eunha	2016	88	—N/a	—	KOR: 33,107+	Fall, in Girl Vol. 1
"Mellow" (꿀이 떨어져) with Solar	2016	48	—N/a	—	KOR: 44,110+	Fall, in Girl Vol. 2
"Our Story" (남녀의 온도차) with Seulgi	2017	28	—N/a	—	KOR: 56,079+	Fall, in Girl Vol. 3
"A Daily Song" (매일 듣는 노래)	2017	6	6	—	KOR: 2,500,000	Be Ordinary
"Rewind" (되돌리고 싶다)	2017	26	71	—	KOR: 100,617+	Non-album single
"The Only Star" (별, 그대)	2018	60	11	—	—N/a	Be Myself
"Single Life" with Wheesung	2018	—	—	—	—N/a	The Call Project
"The Miracle of 1 Percent" (1퍼센트의 기적이라) with Kim Jong-kook	2018	—	—	—	—N/a	The Call Project
"All 2 U" (아깝지 않아) with Kim Jong-kook, UV, Loco, Gray	2018	—	100	—	—N/a	The Call Project
"Learn to Love" (그대가 내 안에 박혔다)	2018	55	—	—	—N/a	Non-album single
"A Walk to Goodbye" (이별을 걷다)	2019	36	—	—	—N/a	The Four Seasons
"Untitled" (제목없음)	2019	—	—	—	—N/a	Non-album single
"Two Letters" (안녕이란)	2021	142	—	—	—N/a	Be My Reason
"All My Days" (내 모든 날에)	2021	—	—	—	—N/a	A Masterpiece of My Life
"Why" (왜 이제와서야)	2022	143	—	—	—N/a	By My Side
"I Still Miss You" (그대는 날 잊고 잘 지내나요)	2022	141	—	—	—N/a	By My Side
"No Love" (그런 사랑은 없어)	2023	196	—	—	—N/a	Non-album single
Chinese
"The Furthest Distance" (最遠的距離)	2016	—	—	1	CHN: 260,000+	Non-album single
"Dream With Me" (陪我一起做夢)	2016	—	—	2	—N/a	Chi-yeul. Love
"—" denotes song did not chart or was not released in that region.

=== Soundtrack appearances ===
Title	Year	Peak chart positions		Sales (DL)	Album
Title	Year	KOR Gaon	KOR Hot 100	Sales (DL)	Album
"Confession" (고해))	2006	—	—	—N/a	Lovers OST
"Bye, Bye" (안녕, 안녕)	2007	—	—	—N/a	Likeable or Not OST
"The Path to the Sky" (하늘길)	2013	—	—	—N/a	The Great Seer OST
"Pencil" (연필)	2015	—	—	—N/a	Mrs. Cop OST
"Because I Miss You" (그리워 그리워서)	2016	17	—	KOR: 103,690+	Love in the Moonlight OST
"For a Moment" (잠시나마)	2017	64	—	KOR: 24,671+	The Emperor: Owner of the Mask OST Part 3
"Like a Miracle Someday" (그 언젠가 기적처럼)	2018	—	96	—N/a	A Korean Odyssey OST Part 7
"How Can I Forget You" (어찌 잊으오)	2018	17	—	—N/a	Mr. Sunshine OST Part 15
"Are You Listening" (듣고 있니)	2018	—	—	—N/a	My Strange Hero OST Part 3
"Tonight" (오늘 밤)	2019	—	—	—N/a	Item OST Part 3
"Quiet Night" (모두 잠든 밤)	2020	—	—	—N/a	The King: Eternal Monarch OST Part 12
"Who Can I Love?" (내가 누굴 사랑할 수 있겠어요)	2021	—	—	—N/a	Drama World OST Part 2
"May You Be Happy" (그대는 행복하길 (낮에 뜨는 달 X 황치열))	2021	—	—	—N/a	The Moon During the Day OST
"Tears" (내 눈물이 하는 말 (연애의 발견 X 황치열))	2022	197	—	—N/a	Discovery of Love OST Part 1
"For You" (너를 위해)	2022			—N/a	Ditto OST
"—" denotes song did not chart or was not released in that region.

== Awards and nominations ==
Year presented, name of the award ceremony, award category, nominated work and the result of the nomination
Year	Award	Category	Nominated work	Result	Ref.
2016	APAN Star Awards	Rising Star Award		Won	
2016	Asia Artist Awards	New Wave Award		Won	
2016	Korean Popular Culture and Arts Awards	Minister of Culture, Sports and Tourism Commendation		Won	
2016	Ku Music Asian Music Awards	Most Able Vocalist		Won	
2016	LeTV Awards	Most Popular Singer		Won	
2016	Music Radio China Top Chart Awards	Most Popular Singer - Overseas		Won	
2016	Music Radio China Top Chart Awards	All-Around Entertainer Award - Overseas		Won	
2017	Asia Artist Awards	Best Icon Award		Won	
2017	Mnet Asian Music Awards	Best Vocal Performance - Male	"A Daily Song"	Nominated	
2017	Soribada Best K-Music Awards	Bonsang (Main Prize)	"A Daily Song"	Won	
2018	Gaon Chart Music Awards	Discovery of the Year - Ballad	"A Daily Song"	Won	
2018	Golden Disc Awards	Album Bonsang (Main Prize)	Be Ordinary	Won	
2018	Mnet Asian Music Awards	Best Male Artist	"The Only Star"	Nominated	
2019	Golden Disc Awards	Album Bonsang (Main Prize)	Be Myself	Nominated	
2020	Asia Artist Awards	Fan N Star Choice Award (Singer)		Nominated	
2020	Golden Disc Awards	Album Bonsang (Main Prize)	The Four Seasons	Nominated	
2020	The Fact Music Awards	Fan N Star Most Votes Award	Hwang Chi-yeul	Won	
2020	The Fact Music Awards	Fan N Star Choice Award	Hwang Chi-yeul	Won	
2021	The Fact Music Awards	Fan N Star Most Votes Award	Hwang Chi-yeul	Won	
2021	The Fact Music Awards	Fan N Star Choice Award	Hwang Chi-yeul	Won	
