= Pink Up =

EP by Apink
- Released: June 26, 2017
- Studios: Seoul, South Korea
- Genres: K-pop; dance-pop
- Length: 23:33
- Label: Plan A Entertainment (Distributed by LOEN Entertainment)

Apink chronology
Pink Doll (2016)	Pink Up (2017)	Pink Stories (2017)

Singles from Pink Up
- 1. "Always" Released: April 19, 2017; 2. "Five" Released: June 26, 2017

Pink Up is the sixth EP by South Korean girl group Apink, released on June 26, 2017. The album's lead single is the title track "Five".

== Track listing ==
No.	Title	Lyrics	Music	Length
1.	"Five"	Shinsadong Tiger; Beom & Nang	Shinsadong Tiger; Beom & Nang	3:12
2.	"Kok Kok" (콕콕; kogkog)	Kim Jin-hwan	Kim Jin-hwan	3:29
3.	"Eyes"	Park Cho-rong	Command Freaks; Sophiya, Shikata	3:56
4.	"Like!" (좋아요!; joh-ayo!)	e.one	e.one	3:04
5.	"Evergreen"	Lee Shin Seong; ZigZag Note	ZigZag Note; Kim Sun-woong	3:36
6.	"Always"	ZigZag Note; Kang Myungshin	ZigZag Note	3:01
7.	"Five" (Inst.)		Shinsadong Tiger; Beom & Nang	3:12
Total length:				23:33

== Charts ==
=== Album ===
Chart	Peak position
Gaon Weekly album chart	1
Gaon Monthly album chart	6

=== Sales and certifications ===
Provider	Amount
Gaon physical sales	53,675+
Oricon physical sales	1,556+
