= Be Ordinary =

EP by Hwang Chi-yeul
- Released: 13 June 2017
- Recorded: Spring 2017
- Genre: Pop
- Length: 25:56
- Labels: NHN Entertainment, How Entertainment
- Producer: Hwang Chi-yeul

Hwang Chi-yeul chronology
Five senses (2007)	Be Ordinary (2017)	Be Myself (2018)

Be Ordinary is the first EP by South Korean singer-songwriter Hwang Chi-yeul, his first studio album in 10 years, released on 13 June 2017, since his debut album Five Senses in 2007.

== Background and release ==
In March 2017, singer Hwang Chi-yeul said during an interview:

"The exact release date hasn't been decided yet, but maybe in June? I think it might be unveiled before summer. There will be a song that I wrote on the new album, some of the tracks will be written by others though."

In June 2017 after the EP's release, Hwang said during an interview with KBS World Radio:

"A song I self-wrote is on my album for the first time. It's track 7, "Alone" and it's a special track for me. I lived on a rooftop when I wrote that song so I was sitting out in the shade on my rooftop when I wrote the lyrics. I thought the emotion of love was so limiting so I watched movies like "If Only" and "The Notebook" to stir up more emotions and wrote the lyrics. That's why this song is so special to me. It's my first album so I was too shy to put it as track 1 so I put it as track 7.",

He explains what "A Daily Song" is about:

"It's a song recalling memories so yes, I do have similar memories. It could be about love, my parents, a childhood incident. Music has the power to bring back memories from when you were young. So I too remember things from my past...when I write songs, of course my experiences are included. I also use other people's stories or movies.",

Be Ordinary describes nearly every aspect of his ordinary everyday life as a musician for the past 10 years he remained unknown. His last release as a studio full-length album was in 2007 with his album Five Senses. Be Ordinary is his first EP.

== Promotion ==
Before the EP's release, Be Ordinary, a teaser video, was released on 9 June 2017. The EP and its official music video, were released on 13 June 2017 and EP consists of seven tracks with many different genres. He wrote the lyrics for the last song, "Alone".

On 24 May 2017, Hwang performed the song "A Daily Song" live for the first time on episode 16 of I Can See Your Voice, Season 4, that was broadcast on 15 June 2017 on Mnet.

On 23 June 2017, "A Daily Song" took first place in the fourth week of June 2017 on KBS Music Bank. The nominees for the Music Bank K-Chart first place were "A Daily Song" by Hwang Chi-yeul and "Untitled, 2014" by G-Dragon.

On 24–25 June 2017, Hwang held his first concert, Yolo Con at the Olympic Park in Seoul and performed his new songs from the EP live.

Hwang is scheduled to hold his solo showcase on 30 July 2017 in Taipei, and in concert on 10–11 August 2017 in Toronto.

Hwang occasionally performs songs from the EP acoustically on a live streaming channel V LIVE.

== Track listing ==
No.	Title	Writer(s)	Length
1.	"Prologue" (프롤로그)	Kang Hwa-sung (David Kang)	1:10
2.	"With you" (같이 가자)	Choi Gap-won, Kang Hwa-sung (David Kang)	4:04
3.	"A Daily Song" (매일 듣는 노래)	Han Gil, Han Wool	4:19
4.	"Angle" (각)	Hong Ji-yu, Son Jun-hyuk, Bull$Eye	3:51
5.	"One Spring Day" (봄이라서)	ENIAC, SONGMARION	3:39
6.	"Goodbye..." (널 위해 배운 이별)	Lee Keun-sang, Lee Mi-a	4:04
7.	"Alone" (사랑 그 한마디)	Hwang Chi-yeul, Jeon Sang-hwan	4:27

== Personnel ==
- Hwang Chi-yeul – vocals
- Kang Hwa-sung (David Kang) – piano, keyboards
- Shin Jeong-eun – keyboards, drums
- Jeong Su-wan – guitar
- Choi Hun – bass
- Han Gil – piano
- Park Shin-won – guitar
- Kang Tae-woo – backing vocals
- Yoon Young-bok – keyboards
- Tommy Kim – guitar
- Bull$Eye – drums
- Son Jun-hyuk – backing vocals
- ENIAC – piano, keyboards, drums
- Kim Da-ham – piano, keyboards
- Lee Gheun-hyung – guitar
- Jang Tae-woong – bass
- Super COO – drums
- Jeon Sang-hwan – piano, bass, drums
- Chung Soo-wan – guitar

== Charts ==
=== Album ===
==== Weekly charts ====
Chart (2017)	Peak position
South Korean Albums (Gaon)	1

==== Monthly charts ====
Chart (2017)	Peak position
South Korean Albums (Gaon)	1

==== Half-Year charts ====
Chart (2017)	Peak position
South Korean Albums (Gaon)	10

==== Year-end charts ====
Chart (2017)	Peak position
South Korean Albums (Gaon)	17

=== Singles ===
Chart (2017)	Single	Peak position
Digital Chart	"A Daily Song"	6
Download Chart	"A Daily Song"	5
Streaming Chart	"A Daily Song"	5
BGM Chart	"A Daily Song"	2
BGM Chart	"Alone"	2
Mobile Chart	"A Daily Song"	2
Singing room Chart	"A Daily Song"	1
Social Chart	"A Daily Song"	61

=== Album sales ===
Gaon Monthly Album Chart, South Korea
Year	Month	Be Ordinary	
Year	Month	Sales	Cumulative sales
2017	June	112,783	112,783
2017	July	4,233	117,016
2017	August	7,151	124,167
2017	September	4,152	128,319
2017	October	11,729	140,048
2017	November	79,574	219,622
2017	December	4,582	224,204
