= W, Here =

EP by NU'EST W
- Released: October 10, 2017
- Recorded: 2017
- Genre: Dance-pop; R&B; electronica
- Length: 19:43
- Label: Pledis Entertainment
- Producer: Han Sungsoo (executive); Bumzu; Baekho

NU'EST W chronology
| W, Here (2017) | Who, You (2018) |

Singles from W, Here
- 1. "Where You At" Released: October 10, 2017

W, Here is the debut extended play by NU'EST W, a subgroup of the South Korean boy band NU'EST. It was released on October 10, 2017, by Pledis Entertainment. The EP features six tracks in total including the lead single "Where You At".

== Background and release ==
On September 14, 2017, Pledis Entertainment announced that JR, Aron, Baekho and Ren would debut as NU'EST W with an extended play titled W, Here on October 10. On October 8 and 9, individual teasers for the music video of the title track "Where You At" were revealed. The EP and the music video for "Where You At" were released on October 10.

== Track listing ==
| No. | Title | Lyrics | Music | Arrangement | Length |
|---|---|---|---|---|---|
| 1. | "하루만" (lit. My Beautiful) | Baekho; JR; Bumzu | Baekho; Bumzu | Bumzu | 3:27 |
| 2. | "Where You At" | Baekho; JR; Bumzu | Baekho; Bumzu; Royal Dive | Bumzu; Royal Dive | 3:10 |
| 3. | "Paradise" (Ren solo) | Ren; Bumzu | Bumzu; Kaelyn Bahr; Jamil "Digi" Chammas; Ryan Vojtesak; MZMC | Styalz Fuego; Jamil "Digi" Chammas; Charlie Handsome | 3:10 |
| 4. | "Good Love" (Aron solo) | Baekho; Aron; Bumzu | Baekho; Bumzu; Curtis F | Curtis F | 3:19 |
| 5. | "With" (JR solo) | JR; Bumzu | Bumzu; Anchor | Anchor | 2:51 |
| 6. | "지금까지 행복했어요" (lit. I Was Happy Until Now) (Baekho solo) | Woozi | Woozi; Won Young Heon; Dong Nae Hyeong; Yamaat | Won Young Heon; Dong Nae Hyeong; Yamaat | 3:29 |
| Total length: | | | | | 19:46 |

== Charts ==
=== Weekly charts ===
| Chart (2017) | Peak position |
|---|---|
| South Korean Albums (Gaon) | 1 |

=== Monthly charts ===
| Chart | Peak position |
|---|---|
| South Korean Albums (Gaon) | 1 |

== Accolades ==
=== Music programs awards ===
| Song | Program | Date |
|---|---|---|
| "Where You At" | M Countdown (Mnet) | October 19, 2017 |
| "Where You At" | Music Bank (KBS) | October 20, 2017 |
