= List of Alchemy of Souls characters =

This is a list of characters of the South Korean television series Alchemy of Souls (2022–2023).

== Cast overview ==
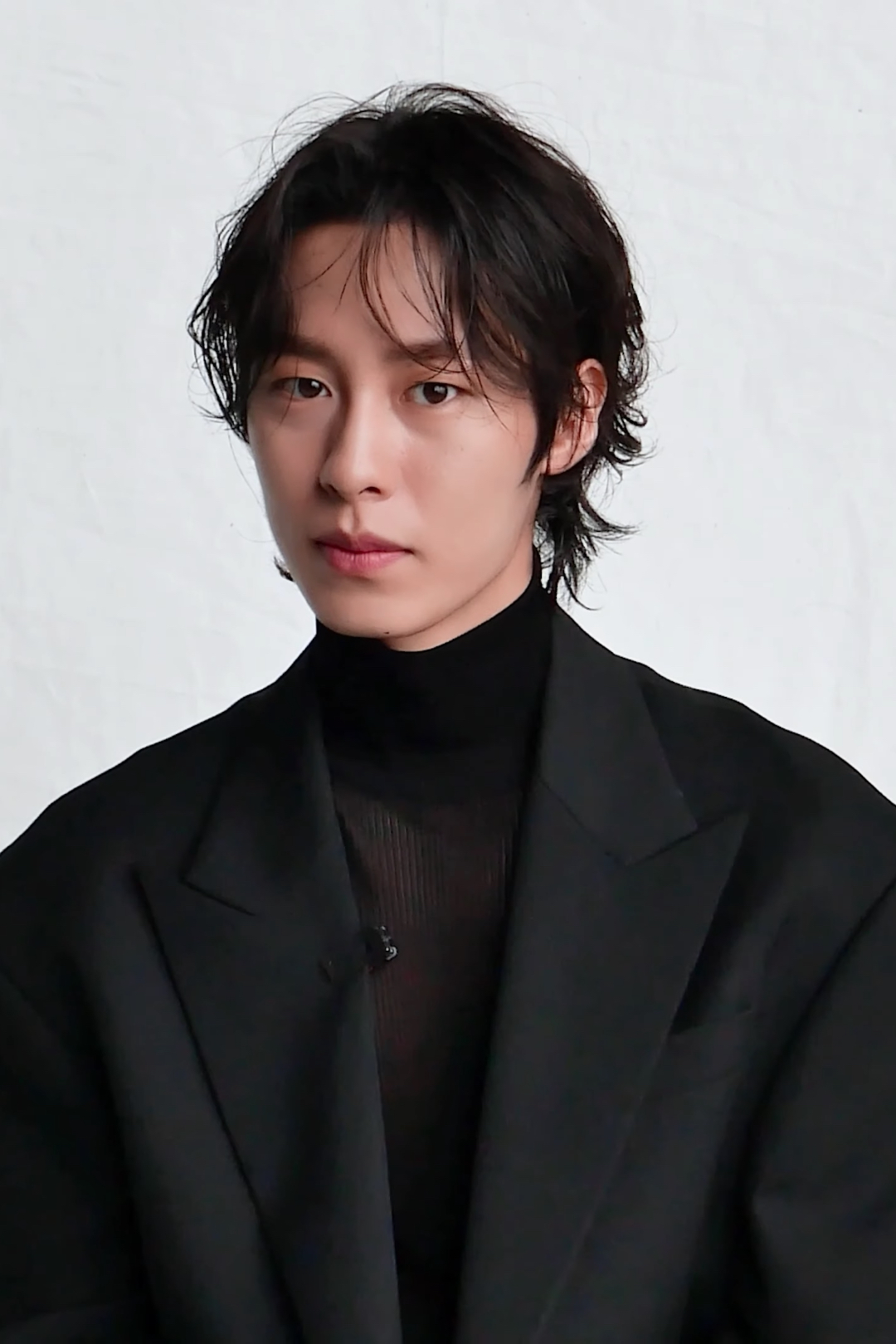
Lee Jae-wook
(Jang Uk)

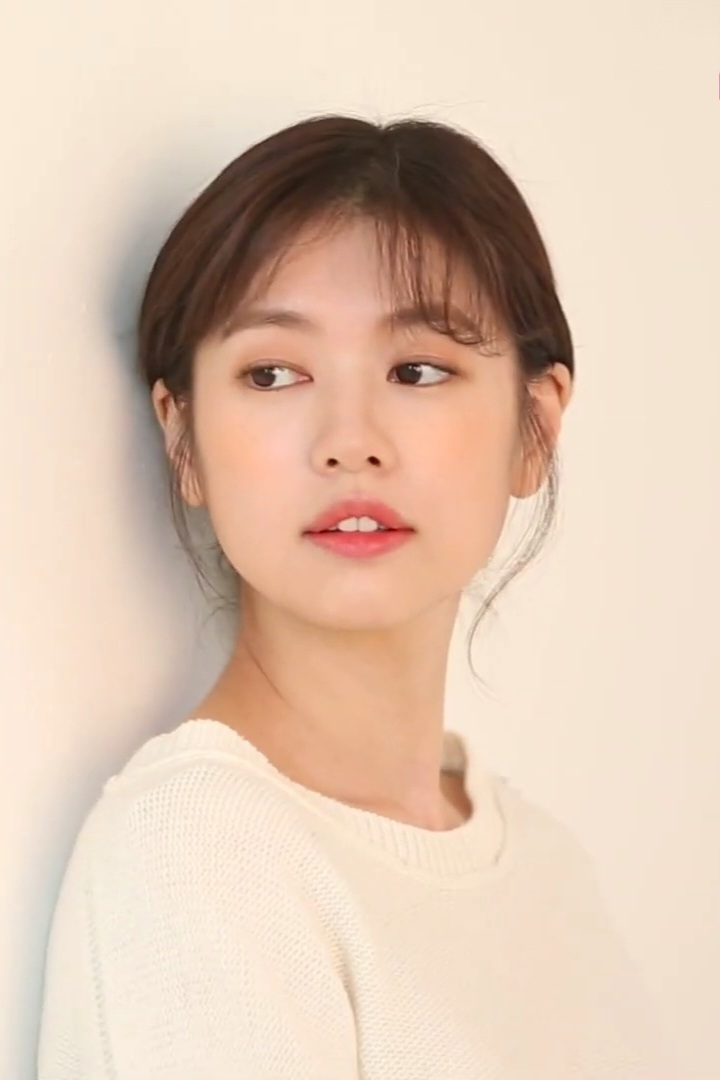
Jung So-min
(Mu-deok / Jin Bu-yeon)

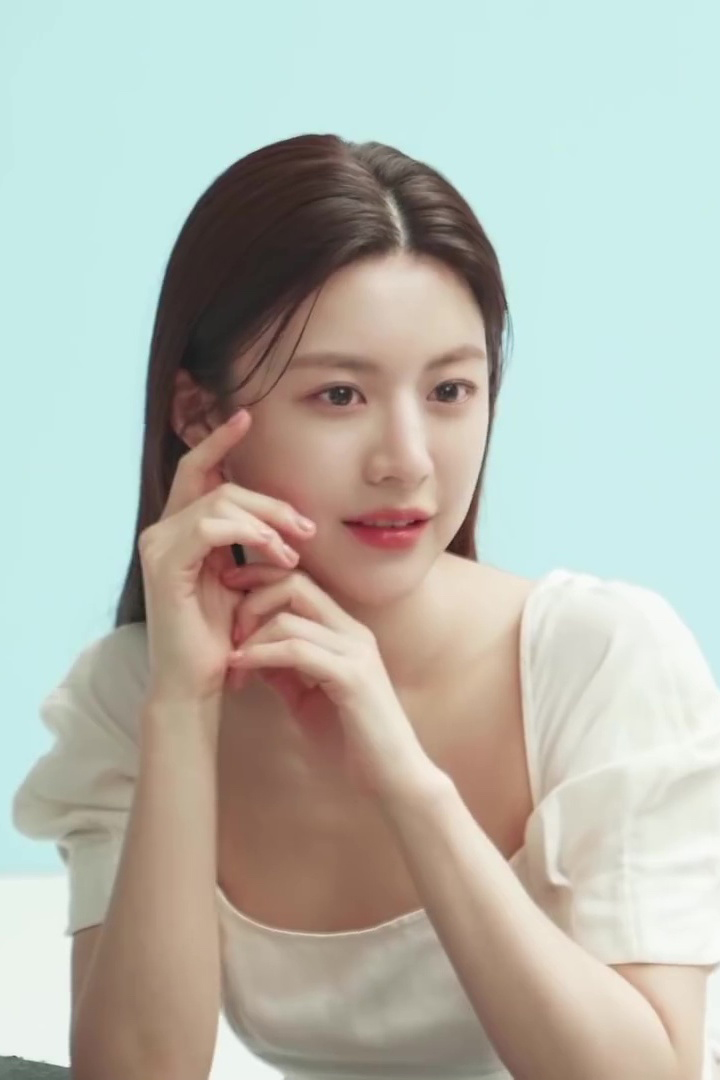
Go Youn-jung
(Cho Yeong / Nak-su)

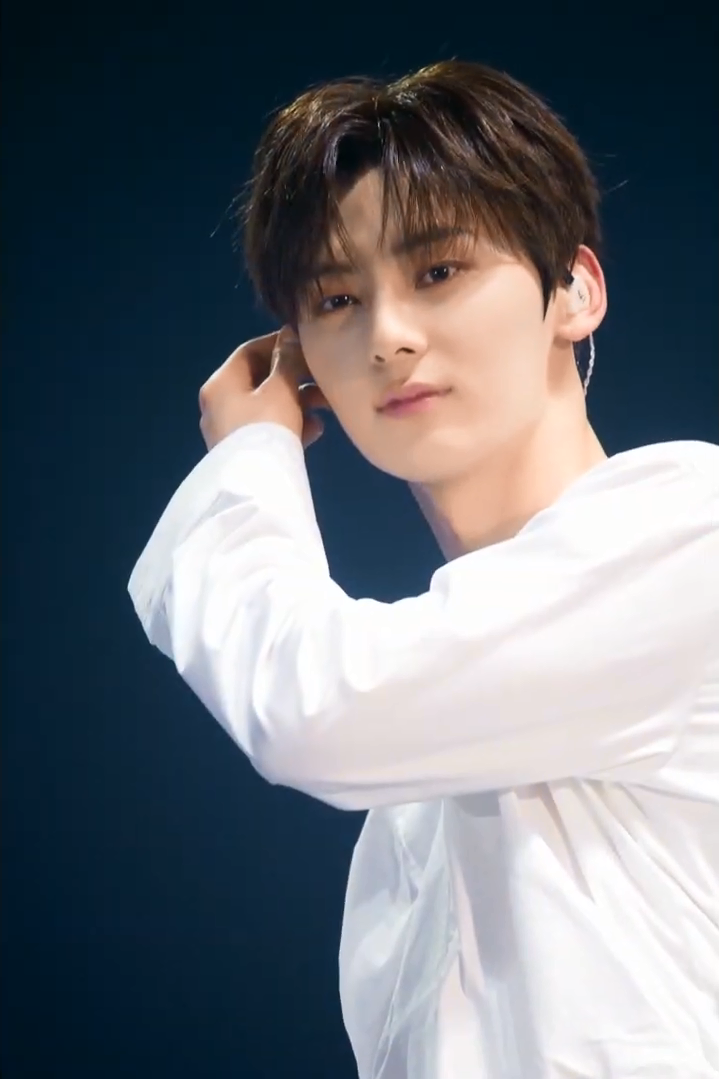
Hwang Min-hyun
(Seo Yul)

Character	Portrayed by	Appearance	
Character	Portrayed by	Part 1	Part 2
Main
Jang Uk	Lee Jae-wook Park Sang-hoon (young)	Main	Main
Mu-deok / Nak-su / Jin Bu-yeon	Jung So-min Yoon Hae-bin (young)	Main	
Jin Bu-yeon / Cho Yeong / Nak-suu	Go Youn-jung Gu Yoo-jung (young)	Guest	Main
Seo Yul	Hwang Min-hyun Moon Seong-hyun (young)	Main	Main
Recurring
Park Jin	Yoo Jun-sang	Recurring	Recurring
Park Dang-gu	Yoo In-soo	Recurring	Recurring
Maidservant Kim Yeon	Oh Na-ra	Recurring	Recurring
Jang Gang	Joo Sang-wook	Recurring	
Crown Prince Go Won	Shin Seung-ho	Recurring	Recurring
King Go Sun	Choi Kwang-il	Recurring	Recurring
Queen Seo Ha-sun	Shim So-young	Recurring	Recurring
Shaman Choi	Kang Kyung-heon	Recurring	
Jin Ho-gyeong	Park Eun-hye	Recurring	Recurring
Jin Cho-yeon	Arin	Recurring	Recurring
Jin U-tak	Joo Seok-tae	Recurring	
Heo Yeom	Lee Do-kyung	Recurring	Recurring
Heo Yun-ok	Hong Seo-hee	Recurring	Recurring
Jin Mu	Jo Jae-yoon	Recurring	Recurring
Master Lee Cheol	Im Chul-soo	Recurring	Recurring
Sang-ho	Lee Ha-yool	Recurring	Recurring
So-yi	Seo Hye-won	Recurring	Recurring
Joo-wol	Park So-jin	Recurring	Recurring
Seo Yun-oh	Do Sang-woo		Recurring

== Main characters ==
=== Jang Uk ===
Jang Uk (Lee Jae-wook) is a young nobleman from Jang Family and son of Jang Gang, Gwanju (head) of Choeonbugwan (Note: an institution directly under the royal family that monitors and records constellation, oversees public order and ancestral rites for the royal family and is in charge of reading the fortunes of the country.). As his mother, Lady Do-hwa dies after giving birth to him and his father abandons him, it was Maidservant Kim who raised Uk. Since his own father blocked his gate of energy when he was an infant making him unable to cast spells, he was rumored to be an illegitimate child born out of an affair of her mother, but he is actually a child born with King's Star, when Jang Gang shifted souls with the former king. Uk has been trained under every master in Daeho, but no one dared open his gate of energy, out of respect for Jang Gang. Uk who has been looking for a master who will unblock his gate of energy for a long time, meets skilled assassin and mage Naksu who has shifted soul into the body of servant girl named Mu-deok, and convinces her to become his master. With Mu-deok's help he gets his energy gate opened and goes through deadly training to become a skilled mage in short period, subsequently joining Songrim – prestigious institute of mages. He falls in love with Mu-deok and vows to protect her as he says "I Love You". In one occasion he gives up all his energy to protect his loved ones, which lets the ice stone enter his body. He then plans to marry Mu-deok and leave the capital, but gets killed in the hands of Mu-deok herself.

In Part 2, which took place three years after the end of Part 1, Jang Uk who was resurrected after death due to the power of the ice stone inside him, has become a merciless hunter of soul shifters (Note: those who live inside a body which is not theirs, by shifting their souls into different body using alchemy of souls.) under the royal command. One day, while capturing a soul shifter, he comes across Jin Bu-yeon, the amnesiac heiress of Jinyowon who requests him to marry her so that she can escape her fate. Uk believing that she can get the ice stone out of his body which will actually result in his death, takes her home. Not knowing her real identity, Jang Uk gradually finds himself falling for Bu-yeon, who was actually Naksu possessing Bu-yeon's body, and he did find the truth later on, which only drew the couple closer. In the end of the finale, Jang Uk successfully thwarted the plans of Jin Mu, killed Jin Mu and uncovered the truth behind the tragedy, and he marries Naksu.

=== Cho Yeong / Nak-su ===
Cho Yeong is the daughter of Cho Chung, a constellation recorder mage at Choeonbugwan. After her father was killed by the four families (Jin, Seo, Jang and Park) of Daeho, Jin Mu takes her under his wing and she is raised in dangerous valleys of Danhyanggok and trained to be an assassin. As she begins to assassinate mages in Daeho under Jin Mu's order, she becomes known as a shadow assassin Nak-su (Go Youn-jung). While attempting to kill the leader of Songrim, Park Jin, Naksu is fatally injured and decides to shift her soul in to new body using alchemy of souls (Note: a forbidden sorcery that can bring a soul into a dead body, take out the soul of a living body, or exchange the souls of different bodies.). Things don't go as she planned and she accidentally shifts her soul inside the body of a blind girl named Mu-deok (Jung So-min). Songrim mages find Nak-su's dead body and presume that Nak-su couldn't shift her soul.

As Nak-su's powerful soul is inside the weak body of Mu-deok, she loses all her powers but Mu-deok is no longer blind. Mu-deok is soon sold off to Chwiseollu, a popular bar in Daeho, where she meets Jang Uk and becomes a servant of Jang family. Jang Uk who has been looking for a master who will unblock his energy gate, recognizes Nak-su and persuades her to become his master. While appearing as Jang Uk's maid Mu-deok, she secretly trains Jang Uk to become an excellent mage, believing that she can get her powers back using Jang Uk. Mu-deok learns that the ice stone – a magical object with power of sky, can prevent herself running wild which is common to soul shifters, and that her father was killed because he was a soul shifter who ran wild killing his family. Though she gets an opportunity to get the ice stone, she gives it up to save Jang Uk whom she has fallen in love with by that time. After Jin Mu recognizes Mu-deok's true identity, he makes her run wild and kill people and she kills Jang Uk. Agonized after killing her lover, Mu-deok jumps to Gyeongcheondaeho lake and dies.

=== Jin Bu-yeon / Mu-deok ===
Jin Bu-yeon (Adult: Go Youn-jung Youth: Yoon Hae-vin) is the eldest daughter of Jin Ho-gyeong and heiress of Jinyowon. Although she was born blind, she has the ability to recognize the energy of people and things. When she was a child, her uncle Jin Mu and father Jin U-tak made her find the ice stone which was in the bottom of Gyeongcheondaeho lake. Jin Mu took the ice stone and pushed her off the boat to drown in the lake. Thereafter Bu-yeon was presumed to be dead. But she washes up on the lake and an old granny from Sari Village takes her home and raises her as Mu-deok (Jung So-min). Years later Nak-su tries to shifts her soul into another woman's body, but Bu-Yeon ensures she enters Mu-deok's body. Unlike most soul shifters, Bu-Yeon's soul remains in Mu-deok's body, along with Naksu.

Jinyowon leader Jin Ho-gyeong who figures out that Mu-deok is her long-lost daughter, finds Mu-deok's body at the bottom of Gyeongcheondaeho lake at the end of Part 1 and begs Master Lee to save her. Master Lee heals her but warns that though the body belongs to Jin Bu-yeon, it was brought back to life using Nak-su's soul. To help disguise her Master Lee gives Jin Bu-yeon Nak-su's face (Go Youn-jung) but she has no recollection of her past, Naksu's mage powers nor Jin Bu-yeon's divine powers except her ability to see energy. In Part 2, Bu-yeon has been locked in a dark room in Jinyowon for 3 years. Jin Ho-gyeong has healed her in order to marry Seo Yun-oh and produce a new heir to Jinyowon. Bu-yeon encounters Jang Uk but they don't recognize each other due her new appearance and having no memory of the past. To escape from Jinyowon and unwanted marriage, she asks Jang Uk to marry her. Jang Uk frees her by kidnapping her on her wedding day, believing that she can get rid of the ice stone inside him because she recognized the ice stone at first sight. She declares marriage with Jang Uk which make her ineligible to become Jinyowon heiress, despite her mother's strong opposition and starts to live with him. When she begins to remember her past memories, she confuses whether they are her own or someone else's. After finding she was Naksu herself and her soul was inside the real Bu-yeon's body, Bu-yeon wanted to distance herself from Jang Uk out of guilt for murdering him three years prior but eventually, their love for each other allowed the couple to finally end up together after Jang Uk successfully thwarted Jin Mu's plots and killed Jin Mu.

Master Lee reveals that the real Bu-yeon is the reincarnated soul of Jin Seol-ran, a powerful priestess who was the love of Seo Gyeong, creator of the Ice Stone and that Jin Seol-ran has been using Bu-Yeon's body and Naksu's soul to work with Jang Uk to thwart Jin Mu's plots.

=== Seo Yul ===
Seo Yul (Hwang Min-hyun) is the eldest son of the Seo family of Seoho Fortress, a genius mage and a man of principles. He has been best friends with Jang Uk and Park Dang-gu since childhood and is nephew to the Queen of Daeho and cousin with the Crown Prince. During his teenage years, he met Cho Yeong (young Nak-su) at Danhyanggok and developed feelings for her. She ended their relationship after learning about his family whom she believed to be responsible for her father's death. Years later, after seeing Nak-su's dead body, Yul figures out that Nak-su was his old friend. Though he later realizes that Mu-deok is Nak-su, he decides to hide her secret.

In Part 2, Yul returns from Seoho Fortress after 3 years. He has been suffering from great pain due to blood parasite inside his body but has kept it a secret. When he meets amnesiac Jin Bu-yeon, they decide to be friends. As he recognizes her true identity, he initially plans to kill her and himself but then decides to not do so after she saved his life. He also found out the truth behind the tragedy three years before and plays a central role in defeating Jin Mu.

== Recurring characters ==
=== Songrim ===
- Park Jin (Yoo Jun-sang) is the leader of Songrim led by Park family. Inside Songrim, Jeongjingak – the largest educational institution for mages, and Sejukwon, and the best medical institution in Daeho, are located. Park Jin is Park Dang-gu's uncle and a father-like figure for Jang Uk. Per Jang Gang's wish, he strongly opposed opening Uk's gate of energy in order protect Uk because he knows the secret of Uk's birth. Park Jin was originally in love with Do-Hwa but develops feelings for Maidservant Kim and eventually marries her. In Part 2, he has retired from his position as the leader of Songrim, taking the responsibility for events which led Jang Uk to end up with the ice stone inside him.
- Park Dang-gu (Yoo In-soo) is the nephew of Park Jin and the next leader of Songrim. He is best friends with Jang Uk and Seo Yul. He falls in love with Jin Cho Yeon, the youngest daughter of Jinyowon, despite the opposition of both families. In Part 2, he has become the leader of Songrim after Park Jin's retirement.
- Sang-ho (Lee Ha-yool) is a Sejukwon mage and Park Jin's subordinate.

=== Jang family ===
- Maidservant Kim (Oh Na-ra) is the housekeeper in charge of Jang family. She is the one who raised Jang Uk since birth thus is mother-like figure for him. She had been in love with Jang Gang but develops feelings for and eventually marries Park Jin.
- Jang Gang (Joo Sang-wook) is a skilled mage and Gwanju (the head) of Cheonbugwan. At the request of the former king, he shifts souls with the king briefly and while being inside his body the king impregnated his wife much to his distress. His wife dies after giving birth to a son, Jang Uk who owns King's star. To protect Jang Uk, he blocks his gate of energy so that he won't be considered as a threat to royal family. Jang Gang leaves the house to find the daughter of Cho Chung, his dead friend, but never returns. Decades later when Jang Uk fights inside the ice stone, Jang Gang returns, blocks energy of Soul Ejector with his body and dies.
- Do-hwa (Bae Gang-hee) is Jang Gang's wife. She dies after giving birth to Jang Uk. She was considered to be the most beautiful lady of Daeho at her time.

=== Royal family ===
- Go Won (Shin Seung-ho) is the Crown Prince and the next King of Daeho, a grumpy prince who wishes to be a benevolent monarch. He is a pupil of Jin Mu who attempts to manipulate him. Though he initially makes rivalry with Jang Uk, he later shares a close relationship with Jang Uk. He is envious of the relationship between Jang Uk and Mu-deok, as he becomes attracted to the feisty but loyal servant.
- Go Sun (Choi Kwang-il) is the King of Daeho and father of Go Won. He became king after his older brother, the former king died leaving no heir. He has been anxious about his throne ever since learning about the prediction that someone born with King's Star will appear.
- Seo Ha-sun (Kang Kyung-heon) / Shim So-young) is the Queen of Daeho, mother of Crown Prince Go Won, a member of Seo family and aunt of Seo Yul. Her soul was trapped inside the body of Shaman Choi who then enters Queen's body. After Shaman Choi dies in Queen's body, Queen returns to her original position but in Shaman Choi's body. She now wishes to move into a beautiful body using alchemy of souls.
- Eunuch Oh (Lee Gi Seob) / is the eunuch who accompanies the Crown Prince and loyal to him.

=== Jinyowon ===
- Jin Ho-gyeong (Park Eun-hye) is the leader of Jinyowon of Jin family. Jin family is led by woman, continues the maternal line and is in charge of many powerful relics. Jin Ho-gyeong who has been searching for her eldest daughter Jin Bu-yeon for 10 years, revives Mu-deok's body believing that Jin Bu-yeon's soul is still alive inside it.
- Jin Cho-yeon (Arin) is the youngest daughter of Jin Ho-gyeong and a powerful priestess of Jinyowon. She falls in love with Park Dang-gu, the next leader of Songrim, despite the opposition of both families.
- Jin U-tak (Joo Seok-tae) is the husband of Jin Ho-kyun and father of Jin Bu-yeon and Jin Cho-yeon. He was originally from Choi family that practices forbidden sorcery and is the brother of Shaman Choi who shifted her soul inside Queen's body. He and Jin Mu introduces a fake Jin Bu-yeon to Jinyowon. He is killed by Mu-deok under Jin Mu's influence.

=== Sejukwon ===
- Heo Yeom (Lee Do-kyung) is a physician, a mage and the head of Sejukwon, the best medical institution in Daeho. He is a pupil of Master Lee.
- Heo Yun-ok (Hong Seo-hee) is Heo Yeom's granddaughter and a physician. She has an unrequited love for Jang Uk.
- Soon-yi (Jung Ji-an) is Heo Yun-ok's personal maid.

=== Seoho fortress ===
- Seo Yul (Hwang Min-hyun) is the eldest son of the Seo family of Seoho Fortress, a genius mage and a man of principles. He has been best friends with Jang Uk and Park Dang-gu since childhood and is nephew to the Queen of Daeho and cousins with the Crown Prince. During his teenage years, he met Cho Yeong (young Nak-su) at Danhyanggok and developed feelings for her. But she ended their relationship after learning about his family whom she believes to be responsible for her father's death. Years later, after seeing Nak-su's dead body, Yul figures out that Nak-su was his old friend. Though he later realizes that Mu-deok is Nak-su (Naksu shifted her soul inside Jin bu-yeon's body/Mu-deok), he decides to hide her secret.
- Seo Yun-oh (Do Sang-woo) is a Seo family member, Seo Yul's uncle and cousin of the Queen. He is an ambitious man who came to Daeho to marry Jin Bu-yeon. He then works under Jin Mu to execute his evil plans.

=== Others ===
- Jin Mu (Jo Jae-yoon) is Gwanju of Cheonbugwan and an evil man full of greed for power. He is an illegitimate child of Jinyowon and half brother of Jin Ho-gyeong. After being banished from Jinyowon, Jang Gang took him in as his assistant and pupil. He is the one who raised Nak-su to be an assassin. He is the teacher of Crown Prince and attempts to manipulate him by instilling rivalry with Jang Uk who owns King's star.
- Master Lee Cheol (Im Chul-soo) is a powerful mage and the last pupil of Master Seo Gyeong – the founder of Songrim. Master Lee is more than 100 years old and has shifted his soul into new body when the old body died. He is the teacher of Heo Yeom. In Part 1, he helps Jang Uk multiple times when he is difficult situations. In Part 2, he is the one who revives Jin Bu-yeon and treats her secretly for 3 years per her mother's request.
- So-yi (Seo Hye-won) is a girl from Sari village where Mu-deok grew up. Jin Mu and Jin U-tak make her impersonate long-lost Jinyowon's eldest daughter Jin Bu-yeon. She has unrequited love for Seo Yul. In Part 2, she operates a gambeling house and works under Jin Mu.
- Joo-wol (Park So-jin) is the owner of Chwiseonru, a top-notch bar in Daeho which is frequented by business and political figures as well as young noblemen.
