= 7th Asia Artist Awards =

2022 edition of award ceremony

2022 Asia Artist Awards
- Official poster
- Awarded for: Outstanding achievements in the music, television and film industry
- Date: December 13, 2022
- Venue: Nippon Gaishi Hall, Nagoya, Japan
- Country: South Korea
- Presented by: Star News; Media Boy
- Hosted by: Jang Won-young; Leeteuk
- First award: 2016
- Website: asiaartistawards.com

Television/radio coverage
- Network: Star Live On; KAVECON

The 2022 Asia Artist Awards (Korean: 2022 아시아 아티스트 어워즈), the 7th edition, presented by Star News and Media Boy, which took place on December 13, 2022 at Nippon Gaishi Hall, Nagoya, Japan. It was hosted by Jang Won-young and Leeteuk, broadcast on Star Live on December 13, 2022 at 16.00 (KST). The ceremony featured 35 singers and 18 actors representing Korea.

== Winners ==
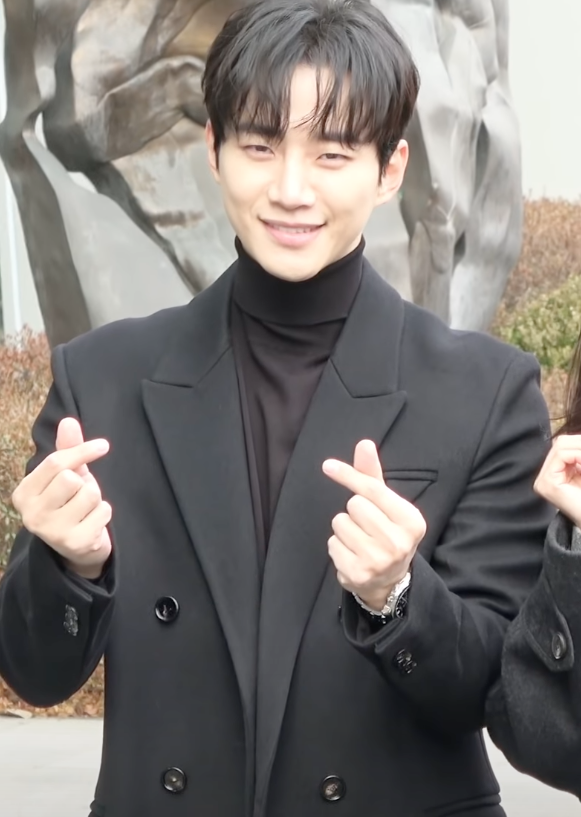
Lee Jun Ho, winner of Actor of the Year Grand Prize (Daesang)

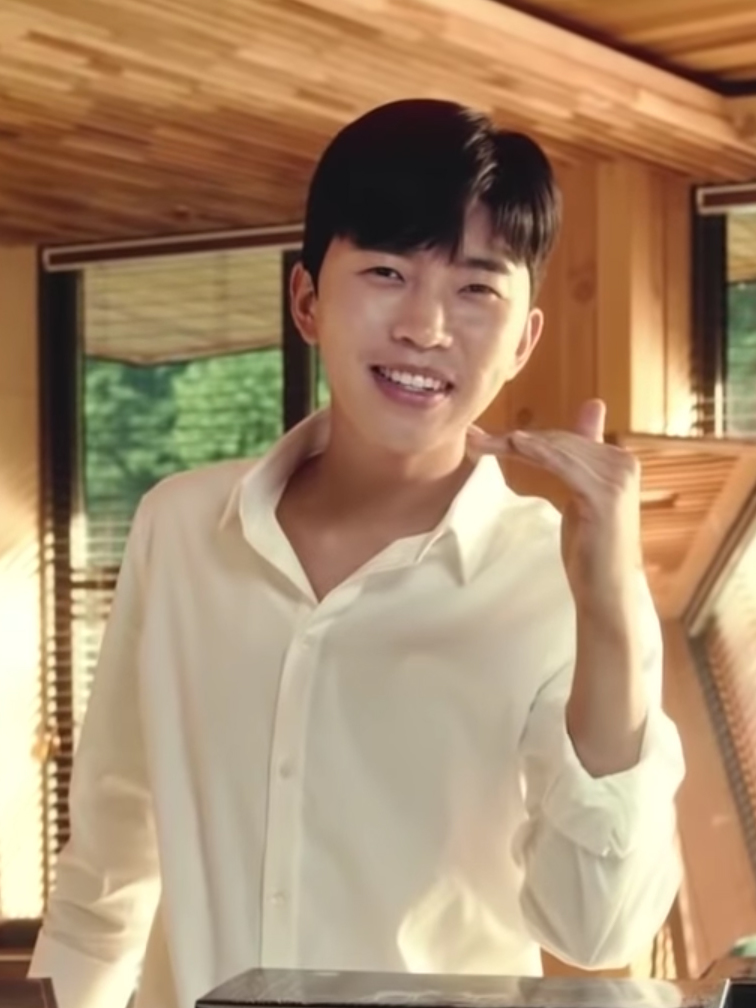
Lim Young-woong, winner of Stage of the Year Grand Prize (Daesang)

Winners of Best Artist Award

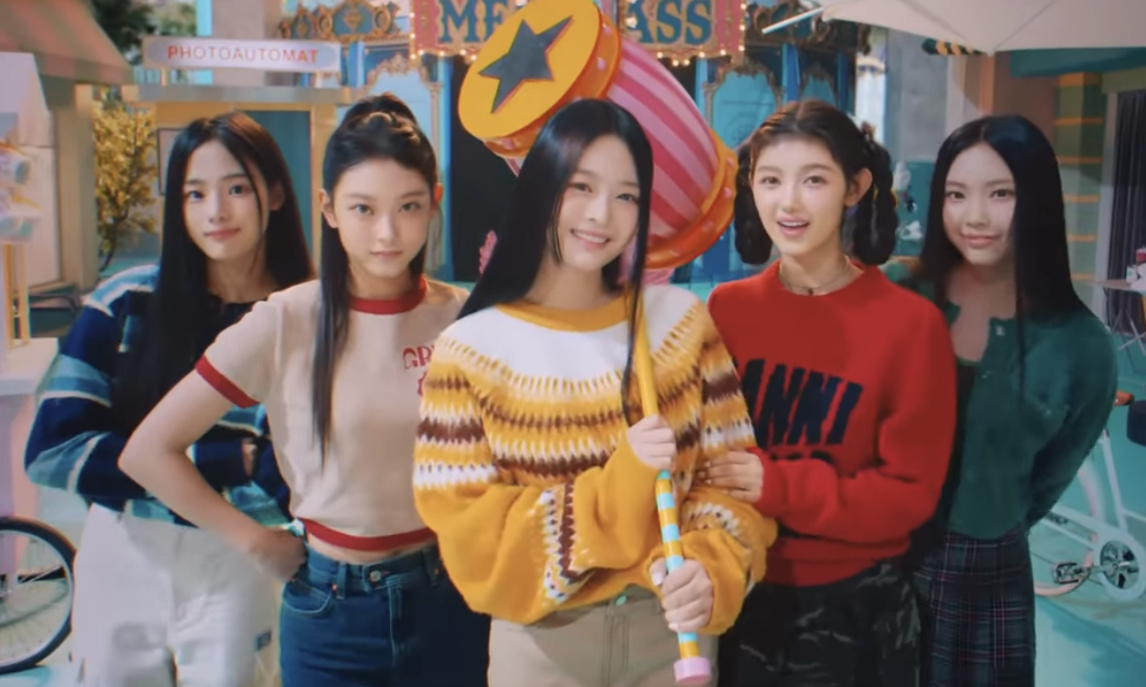
NewJeans, winner of Performance of the Year Grand Prize (Daesang)

Winners are listed and emphasized in bold.

Grand Prize (Daesang)
**Actor of the Year: Lee Jun Ho**; **Performance of the Year: NewJeans**; **Stage of the Year: Lim Young-woong**; **Song of the Year: Ive**; **Album of the Year: Stray Kids**; **Singer of the Year: Seventeen**
Fabulous Award
Television	Music
**Lim Young-woong**	**Seventeen**
Best Artist Award
Television	Music
**Han So-hee**; **Seo In-guk**; **Park Min-young**	**Itzy**; **The Boyz**; **The Rampage**
Asia Celebrity
Television	Music
**Kim Seon-ho**; **Kwon Yu-ri**; **PP Krit**; **Billkin**	**Itzy**; **Be First**; **Lyodra**
Idol Plus Popularity Award
Television / Film	Music
**Kim Seon-ho**	**BTS**
DCM Popularity Award
Television / Film	Music
**Kim Seon-ho**; **Kim Se-jeong**	**Blackpink**; **Lim Young-woong**
Rookie of the Year
Television / Film	Music
**Kang Daniel**; **Seo Bum-june**	**Ive**; **Le Sserafim**; **NewJeans**
Best Icon Award
Television / Film	Music
**Im Jae-hyuk**	**AleXa**; **Verivery**
Focus Award
Television / Film	Music
**Haknyeon**	**Lapillus**; **ATBO**; **Trendz**
New Wave Award
Television / Film	Music
**Hwang Min-hyun**; **Choi Si-won**	**Tempest**; **Nmixx**; **Kep1er**
Best Emotive Award
Television / Film	Music
**Na In-woo**	**Cravity**; **Nmixx**
Best Choice Award
Television / Film	Music
**Kim Seon-ho**	**WJSN Chocome**; **Kard**; **Stray Kids**; **Kep1er**; **Pentagon**
Hot Trend Award
Television / Film	Music
**Lee Jun-ho**; **Park Min-young**	**Ive**; **NiziU**; **Lim Young-woong**; **Seventeen**
Potential Award
Television / Film	Music
**Kang Daniel**	**Lightsum**; **TFN**; **Kingdom**; **Billlie**
Best Acting Performance Award	Best Actor Award
**Bona**; **Kim Young-dae**; **Hwang Min-hyun**; **Choi Si-won**	**Lee Jae-wook**; **Kim Se-jeong**; **Lee Jun-young**; **Kwon Yu-ri**
Best Musician Award	Best Producer Award
**Le Sserafim**; **Peck**; **Choi Ye-na**; **Treasure**; **NiziU**	**Seo Hyun-joo (Starship Entertainment)**
AAA Scene Stealer	AAA Best Achievement Award
**Ryu Kyung-soo**	**Kwon Yu-ri**
