= Song Min-jae =

South Korean actor (born 2012)

- Born: April 14, 2012 (age 13); South Korea
- Occupation: Actor
- Years active: 2013–present

Korean name
- Hangul: 송민재
- Hanja: 宋珉哉
- RR: Song Minjae
- MR: Song Minjae

Song Min-jae (Korean: 송민재; born April 14, 2012) is a South Korean actor.

== Career ==
Born in Seoul on April 14, 2012, he made his debut as an actor in the 2013 KBS 2TV weekend soap opera Seoyoung, My Daughter.

Among the representative works, the dramas include the 2018 KBS 2TV evening daily drama Love to the End, the 2019 KBS 1TV daily soap opera Home for Summer, Do Do Sol Sol La La Sol, Hometown Cha-Cha-Cha, Mouse, Big Bet, and Welcome to Samdal-ri.

== Filmography ==
=== Television series ===
Year	Title	Role	Notes	Ref.
2013	Seoyoung, My Daughter	Kang Sol	Son of Lee Seo-young and Kang Woo-jae	
2013	Blooded Palace: The War of Flowers	Yi Jung		
2016	Shopping King Louie	Young Goboknam		
2016	I'm Sorry, But I Love You	Young Gangnam-gu		
2017	Bad Thief, Good Thief			
2017	The King in Love	Young Chungseon of Goryeo		
2017	Black			
2018	Grand Prince			
2018	Love to the End	Han Yoon-soo		
2018	The Smile Has Left Your Eyes	Missing child		
2018	Quiz of God	Young Jeong Seung-bin (Jeong Do-hyun)		
2019	Home for Summer	서여름 / 한여름 / 주여름		
2019	Abyss	The child crying in front of the operating room		
2019	Gracious Revenge	Hwang Do-ri		
2020	Welcome	Dae-sung		
2020	Once Again	Yoo Si-hoo		
2020	Good Casting			
2020	Sweet Munchies	Young Park Jin-woo		
2020	Do Do Sol Sol La La Sol	Shin Jae-min		
2020	Birthcare Center	Kim Ra-on		
2020	KBS Drama Special - Going out			
2021	Mouse	young Ko Moo-chi		
2021	River Where the Moon Rises	Young Yeongyang of Goguryeo		
2021	Hometown Cha-Cha-Cha	Young Hong Du-sik		
2021	KBS Drama Special - Three	Yoo Jae-min		
2022	Forecasting Love and Weather	Young Lee Si-woo		
2022	Jinxed at First	Wang Hyun-soo		

=== Web series ===
Year	Title	Role	Ref.
2020–2021	A Love So Beautiful	Cha Heon	
2022	Big Bet	young Cha Mu-sik	

== Awards and nominations ==
Year	Award	Category	Recipient	Result	Ref.
2019	31st KBS Drama Awards	Best Young Actor	Song Min-jae	Nominated	
