= Jūhan Shuttai! =

Japanese manga series

- First tankōbon volume cover

重版出来
- Genre: Slice of life
- Manga
- Written by: Naoko Matsuda
- Published by: Shogakukan
- Magazine: Monthly Big Comic Spirits
- Original run: September 27, 2012 – June 27, 2023
- Volumes: 19
- Television drama
- Directed by: Nobuhiro Doi; Ayuko Tsukahara; Ryosuke Fukuda
- Written by: Akiko Nogi
- Music by: Shin Kono
- Studio: TBS Holdings
- Original network: TBS
- Original run: April 12, 2016 – June 14, 2016
- Episodes: 10
- Live-action TV series
- Today's Webtoon

Jūhan Shuttai! (重版出来; 'Second Print Run Confirmed!' or 'Sleepeeer Hit!') is a Japanese slice of life manga series written and illustrated by Naoko Matsuda. It was serialized in Shogakukan's seinen manga magazine Monthly Big Comic Spirits from September 2012 to June 2023, with its chapters collected in 19 tankōbon volumes as of December 2022.

The manga was adapted into a 10-episode Japanese television drama series broadcast from April to June 2016. In 2017, the manga won the 62nd Shogakukan Manga Award in the general category.

== Characters ==
Kokoro Kurosawa (黒沢 心, Kurosawa Kokoro)
Portrayed by: Haru Kuroki
Kei Iokibe (五百旗頭 敬, Iokibe Kei)
Portrayed by: Joe Odagiri
Yasuki Wada (和田 靖樹, Wada Yasuki)
Portrayed by: Yutaka Matsushige
Jun Koizumi (小泉 純, Koizumi Jun)
Portrayed by: Kentaro Sakaguchi

== Media ==
=== Manga ===
Jūhan Shuttai!, written and illustrated by Naoko Matsuda, was serialized in Shogakukan's Monthly Big Comic Spirits magazine from September 27, 2012, to June 27, 2023. Shogakukan has compiled its chapters into individual tankōbon volumes. The first volume was released on March 29, 2013. As of December 12, 2022, 19 volumes have been released.

==== Volumes ====
No.	Japanese release date	Japanese ISBN
1	March 29, 2013	978-4-09-185040-9
2	September 30, 2013	978-4-09-185416-2
3	March 28, 2014	978-4-09-186029-3
4	September 30, 2014	978-4-09-186399-7
5	April 10, 2015	978-4-09-186826-8
6	October 9, 2015	978-4-09-187256-2
7	March 30, 2016	978-4-09-187499-3
8	August 30, 2016	978-4-09-187778-9
9	April 12, 2017	978-4-09-189436-6
10	October 12, 2017	978-4-09-189657-5
11	May 11, 2018	978-4-09-189872-2
12	December 12, 2018	978-4-09-860144-8
13	June 12, 2019	978-4-09-860312-1
14	February 12, 2020	978-4-09-860540-8
15	August 7, 2020	978-4-09-860693-1
16	March 12, 2021	978-4-09-860862-1
17	September 10, 2021	978-4-09-861143-0
18	April 12, 2022	978-4-09-861272-7
19	December 12, 2022	978-4-09-861482-0
20	August 9, 2023	978-4-09-862541-3

=== Drama ===
==== Japanese drama ====
A Japanese television drama series adaptation of the same title was announced in February 2016. It ran for 10 episodes on TBS from April 12 to June 14, 2016.

==== Korean drama ====
A Korean drama adaptation of the manga, titled Today's Webtoon (오늘의 웹툰), developed by Studio S, and co-produced by Binge Works and Studio N, ran for 16 episodes on SBS TV from July 29 to September 17, 2022.

== Reception ==
Volume 4 reached the 50th place on the weekly Oricon manga chart and, by October 5, 2014, has sold 21,090 copies.

The manga ranked fourth on the 2014 Kono Manga ga Sugoi!'s Top 20 Manga for Male Readers survey. It ranked 21st on the 2023 "Book of the Year" list by Da Vinci magazine.

It was nominated for the 18th Tezuka Osamu Cultural Prize Reader Award. It was also nominated for the 7th Manga Taishō, receiving 46 points and placing sixth among the ten nominees. In 2017, the manga won the 62nd Shogakukan Manga Award in the general category, sharing it with Blue Giant.
