= Do Do Sol Sol La La Sol =

2020 South Korean television series

- Promotional poster
- Hangul: 도도솔솔라라솔
- RR: Dodosolsollarasol
- MR: Todosolsollarasol
- Genre: Comedy; Romance
- Created by: KBS Production Plan
- Written by: Oh Ji-young
- Directed by: Kim Min-kyung
- Starring: Go Ara; Lee Jae-wook; Kim Joo-hun
- Country of origin: South Korea
- Original language: Korean
- No. of episodes: 16

Production
- Executive producer: Yoon Jae Hyuk
- Producer: Jung Hae-ryung
- Running time: 60 minutes
- Production company: Monster Union

Original release
- Network: KBS2
- Release: October 7 – November 26, 2020

Do Do Sol Sol La La Sol (Korean: 도도솔솔라라솔; RR: Dodosolsollarasol) is a South Korean television series starring Go Ara, Lee Jae-wook, and Kim Joo-hun. It was scheduled to premiere on KBS2 and Netflix on August 26, 2020. However, KBS postponed its premiere date to prevent the spread of COVID-19. The series aired from October 7 to November 26, 2020, every Wednesday and Thursday at 21:30 (KST).

== Synopsis ==
The energetic and cheerful pianist named Goo Ra-ra lost everything she had in a sudden, turning her lucky rich life into rags. While trying to rebuild her new life, she meets a mysterious, warm-hearted multi part-time worker named Sunwoo Joon. After their unpredictable meeting, Sunwoo Joon starts to help Goo Ra-ra by paying for her daily expenses, even building a small place for her piano lessons called Lala Land in order to help her get back on her feet. Together, they get involved with people that live in a small town (Eunpo City) in the countryside. This is the place where their secrets, pain, stories, and the reason behind Jeon Sun-woo's thoughtful acts towards Goo Ra-ra slowly start to leak out. Eventually Joon leaves for his treatment of cancer bidding an emotional farewell to Ra-ra through a letter and returns after he is fully cured.

== Cast ==
=== Main ===
- Go Ara as Goo Ra-ra
  - Park So-yi as young Ra-ra

Rara is Man-soo's only daughter and heiress of Rara Cosmetics. Despite being out of luck, she is an optimistic pianist whose talent of seeing the best in people and any situation brightens and touches the lives of those around her.

- Lee Jae-wook as Joon Sun-woo
  - Shim Ji-wan as young Joon

Joon is a mysterious and aloof, yet good-looking and warm-hearted man who has his own secrets and pains. Although he keeps and maintains his distant demeanor from others, always showing his best level of alpha power, he finds himself instantly drawn, captivated and hooked by Goo Ra-ra's positive and childish charms.

- Kim Joo-hun as Cha Eun-suk

Eun-suk is a divorced orthopedic surgeon feeling the effects of Burnout syndrome who was once a pianist. His voice and presence could instantly inspire trust from other people. Eun-suk also finds himself drawn to Goo Ra-ra, marvelling at her simplicity, energy and warm personality.

=== Supporting ===
==== Eunpo residents ====
- Ye Ji-won as Jin Sook-kyeong, Ha-young's mother and owner of Jin's Beauty Salon.
- Shin Eun-soo as Jin Ha-yeong, Sook-kyung's daughter.
- Yoon Jong-bin as Lee Seung-gi (named after a famous ballad singer), Ha-young's best friend who secretly likes her.
- Lee Soon-jae as Kim Man-bok, an old man who does various jobs around Eunpo.
- Song Min-jae as Shin Jae-min, a child prodigy who can play the piano just by listening to the music.
- Park Sung-yeon as Seung-gi's mother, Sook-kyeong's friend and customer at Jin's Beauty Salon.
- Lee Seon-hee as Ye-seo's mother, Sook-kyeong's friend and customer at Jin's Beauty Salon.
- Kim Jung-yeon as Mi-ran, Sook-kyeong's friend and customer at Jin's Beauty Salon.

==== People around Joon Sun-woo ====
- Seo Yi-sook as Jo Yoon-sil, Joon's overprotective mother.
- Choi Kwang-il as Sunwoo Myung, Joon's father
- Lee Si-woo as Kim Ji-hoon, Joon's friend
- Kwon Eun-bin as Jung Ga-young

==== People around Goo Ra-ra ====
- Um Hyo-sup as Goo Man-su, Goo Ra-ra's father and President of Rara Cosmetics
- Moon Hee-kyung as Gong Mi-sook, a professor who taught Rara piano from her childhood to college with passion and sincerity
- Ahn Nae-sang as Secretary Moon, Man-su's secretary, he disappeared after the bankruptcy of Ra-ra Cosmetics
- Moon Tae-yoo as Bang Jeong-nam, Ra-ra's ex-fiancé and Eun-seok's junior at medical school
- Jeon Soo-kyeong as Im Ja-kyung, Jeong-nam's mother
- Kim Ju-yeon as Kim Si-ah, Ra-ra's university friend

=== Others ===
- Choi Kwang-je as Chu Min-su, a private detective who is looking for Joon
- Lee Soo-mi as Oh Young-joo as Eun-seok's ex-wife
- Kang Hyung-suk as Ahn Joong-ho, a mysterious fellow in Eunpo
- Kim Bum-suk as Detective Kang Min-guk

== Production ==
The drama is helmed by director Kim Min-kyung and penned by screenwriter Oh Ji-young, who wrote Shopaholic Louis (2016) and My Secret, Terrius (2018).

The first script reading took place early in May 2020 in South Korea.

The series was originally scheduled to premiere on August 26, 2020. However, one of the cast members, Heo Dong-won was tested positive for COVID-19 and as a preventative measure, KBS halted all production activities until further notice. The series resumed filming on September 1, 2020, after the cast members tested negative.

== Original soundtrack ==
Do Do Sol Sol La La Sol OST

Soundtrack album by Various artists
- Released: 2020
- Genre: Soundtrack
- Languages: Korean; English
- Labels: Vlending; MusicBuddy

=== Part 1 ===
Released on October 7, 2020
No.	Title	Lyrics	Music	Artist	Length
1.	"To Be With You"	Woo Ji-hoon; Park Se-joon	Woo Ji-hoon; Park Se-joon	Kihyun (Monsta X)	3:47
2.	"To Be With You" (Inst.)		Woo Ji-hoon; Park Se-joon		3:47
Total length:					7:34

=== Part 2 ===
Released on October 8, 2020
No.	Title	Lyrics	Music	Artist	Length
1.	"Like A Dream" (꿈인 듯 해)	Han Joon; Park Se-joon	Lee Yoo-jin; Park Se-joon	SinB (GFriend)	3:52
2.	"Like A Dream" (Inst.)		Lee Yoo-jin; Park Se-joon		3:52
Total length:					7:44

=== Part 3 ===
Released on October 14, 2020
No.	Title	Lyrics	Music	Artist	Length
1.	"Loving You"	Lee Hyun-sang; Han Kyung-soo; Choi Ji-san; Park Se-joon	Lee Hyun-sang; Han Kyung-soo; Choi Ji-san; VioletK	Lovelyz (Baby Soul, Mijoo, Jin)	3:13
2.	"Loving You" (Inst.)		Lee Hyun-sang; Han Kyung-soo; Choi Ji-san; VioletK		3:13
Total length:					6:26

=== Part 4 ===
Released on October 15, 2020
No.	Title	Lyrics	Music	Artist	Length
1.	"We Already Fell In Love"	Red Socks; Park Se-joon	Red Socks	(G)I-DLE (Miyeon, Minnie)	3:02
2.	"We Already Fell In Love" (Inst.)		Red Socks		3:02
Total length:					6:04

=== Part 5 ===
Released on October 21, 2020
No.	Title	Lyrics	Music	Artist	Length
1.	"Melody"	Han Joon; Park Se-joon	Han Kyung-soo; Lee Jung-woo; Kang Woo-jin; Choi Min-joon; VioletK	Yun Ddan Ddan	3:07
2.	"Melody" (Inst.)		Han Kyung-soo; Lee Jung-woo; Kang Woo-jin; Choi Min-joon; VioletK		3:07
Total length:					6:14

=== Part 6 ===
Released on October 22, 2020
No.	Title	Lyrics	Music	Artist	Length
1.	"It's Too Hard For Me" (내겐 너무 힘들어)	jeebanoff	jeebanoff; plan8	jeebanoff	3:12
2.	"It's Too Hard For Me" (Inst.)		jeebanoff; plan8		3:12
Total length:					6:24

=== Part 7 ===
Released on October 28, 2020
No.	Title	Lyrics	Music	Artist	Length
1.	"My Story" (내 얘기를 들어줘)	Han Kyung-soo; Park Se-joon	Han Kyung-soo; Choi Han-sol; VioletK	U Sung-eun	3:37
2.	"My Story" (Inst.)		Han Kyung-soo; Choi Han-sol; VioletK		3:37
Total length:					7:14

=== Part 8 ===
Released on October 29, 2020
No.	Title	Lyrics	Music	Artist	Length
1.	"Green" (초록)	Epitone Project	Epitone Project	Epitone Project	3:11
2.	"Green" (Inst.)		Epitone Project		3:11
Total length:					6:22

=== Part 9 ===
Released on November 4, 2020
No.	Title	Lyrics	Music	Artist	Length
1.	"Love or Lies"	Taibian; Park Se-joon	Taibian; Bark; YESY	Boramiyu	3:39
2.	"Love or Lies" (Inst.)		Taibian; Bark; YESY		3:39
Total length:					7:18

=== Part 10 ===
Released on November 5, 2020
No.	Title	Lyrics	Music	Artist	Length
1.	"Always Remember"	Han Joon; Park Se-joon	Han Kyung-soo; Choi Han-sol	Sondia	3:26
2.	"Always Remember" (Inst.)		Han Kyung-soo; Choi Han-sol		3:26
Total length:					6:52

=== Part 11 ===
Released on November 11, 2020
No.	Title	Lyrics	Music	Artist	Length
1.	"I'll Comfort You" (위로가 될게)	Taibian; Park Se-joon	Taibian; Buck; YESY	Elaine	4:06
2.	"I'll Comfort You" (Inst.)		Taibian; Buck; YESY		4:06
Total length:					8:12

=== Part 12 ===
Released on November 12, 2020
No.	Title	Lyrics	Music	Artist	Length
1.	"Falling In Love"	Han Joon; Park Se-joon; CR Kim	Kim Soo-bin (Aiming); Cho Se-hee; Jung Min-young; Moon Yeon; Choi Seul-gi	April	3:03
2.	"Falling In Love" (Inst.)		Kim Soo-bin (Aiming); Cho Se-hee; Jung Min-young; Moon Yeon; Choi Seul-gi		3:03
Total length:					6:06

=== Part 13 ===
Released on November 18, 2020
No.	Title	Lyrics	Music	Artist	Length
1.	"Dream" (이런 상상)	Lee Eun-ah; Captain Planet; Park Se-joon	Captain Planet; Lee Eun-ah	Sohee (Elris)	3:09
2.	"Dream" (Inst.)		Captain Planet; Lee Eun-ah		3:09
Total length:					6:18

=== Part 14 ===
Released on November 19, 2020
No.	Title	Lyrics	Music	Artist	Length
1.	"Hurt" (아파)	Bonggu	Bonggu; Kim Ye-il	GB9	4:05
2.	"Hurt" (Inst.)		Bonggu; Kim Ye-il		4:05
Total length:					8:10

=== Part 15 ===
Released on November 25, 2020
No.	Title	Lyrics	Music	Artist	Length
1.	"Everyday, Everynight"	Han Joon; Park Se-joon	Lee Yoo-jin; Park Se-joon	Song Ji-eun	3:40
2.	"Everyday, Everynight" (Inst.)		Lee Yoo-jin; Park Se-joon		3:40
Total length:					7:20

=== Part 16 ===
Released on November 26, 2020
No.	Title	Lyrics	Music	Artist	Length
1.	"You Are My Star"	Kim Sang-woo; Love	Kim Sang-woo; Song Ho-il	Woody	3:34
2.	"You Are My Star" (Inst.)		Kim Sang-woo; Song Ho-il		3:34
Total length:					7:08

=== Classical music quoted ===
- Episode 1
  - Twelve Variations on "Ah vous dirai-je, Maman", nursery rhyme arr. W.A. Mozart.
  - Grande valse Brilliante in E-flat, Op. 18, by Chopin.
  - La Campanella by Franz Liszt.
  - Sonatine (Mouvement de Menuet), by Ravel.
  - Six Moments Musicaux, by Rachmaninoff.
- Episode 2
  - Twelve Variations on "Ah vous dirai-je, Maman", nursery rhyme arr. W.A. Mozart.
  - Je te veux, by Erik Satie. Arranged for clarinet, piano, and cello.
- Episode 3
  - Prelude & Fugue 2 in C minor by J.S. Bach
  - Prelude No 1 in C major from the Well-tempered Clavier by J.S. Bach
  - Goldberg variations (Aria da capo) by J.S. Bach
  - Pathétique piano sonata in C minor by Ludwig van Beethoven
  - Prelude in D from the Well-tempered Clavier by J.S. Bach
  - Toccata and Fugue in D minor by J.S. Bach
  - A maiden's prayer by Tekla Bądarzewska-Baranowska
- Episode 4
  - Je te veux, by Erik Satie. Arranged for solo piano.
  - Etude in C major no 1, Opus 10 by Frédéric Chopin

== Ratings ==
Average TV viewership ratings
Ep.	Part	Original broadcast date	Title	Average audience share (Nielsen Korea)
Ep.	Part	Original broadcast date	Title	Nationwide
1	1	October 7, 2020	Do Do Sol Sol La La Sol	1.9%
1	2	October 7, 2020	Do Do Sol Sol La La Sol	2.6%
2	1	October 8, 2020	Pianist Patient	2.8%
2	2	October 8, 2020	Pianist Patient	2.6%
3	1	October 14, 2020	Da Capo	2.1%
3	2	October 14, 2020	Da Capo	2.9%
4	1	October 15, 2020	La La Piano Land	2.4%
4	2	October 15, 2020	La La Piano Land	2.8%
5	1	October 21, 2020	Night and Dreams	2.3%
5	2	October 21, 2020	Night and Dreams	2.7%
6	1	October 22, 2020	Secrets and Lies	2.1%
6	2	October 22, 2020	Secrets and Lies	3.0%
7	1	October 28, 2020	You Are So Special	2.3%
7	2	October 28, 2020	You Are So Special	3.2%
8	1	October 29, 2020	Plaisir d'amour (Pleasure of Love)	2.5%
8	2	October 29, 2020	Plaisir d'amour (Pleasure of Love)	3.5%
9	1	November 4, 2020	The Night of Thunder	3.2%
9	2	November 4, 2020	The Night of Thunder	3.6%
10	1	November 5, 2020	Who Are You?	2.8%
10	2	November 5, 2020	Who Are You?	2.9%
11	1	November 11, 2020	Reunion	2.8%
11	2	November 11, 2020	Reunion	3.5%
12	1	November 12, 2020	Hochzeitsmarsch (Wedding March)	3.5%
12	2	November 12, 2020	Hochzeitsmarsch (Wedding March)	4.2%
13	1	November 18, 2020	Romance Without Words	2.8%
13	2	November 18, 2020	Romance Without Words	3.7%
14	1	November 19, 2020	Una Furtiva Lagrima (A Furtive Tear)	3.1%
14	2	November 19, 2020	Una Furtiva Lagrima (A Furtive Tear)	3.8%
15	1	November 25, 2020	Tristesse (Farewell)	3.2%
15	2	November 25, 2020	Tristesse (Farewell)	3.5%
16	1	November 26, 2020	Finale: Do Do Sol Sol La La Sol	3.4%
16	2	November 26, 2020	Finale: Do Do Sol Sol La La Sol	4.1%
Average				3.0%
The blue numbers represent the lowest ratings and the red numbers represent the highest ratings.; NR denotes that the series did not rank in the top 20 daily programs on that date.

== Awards and nominations ==
Name of the award ceremony, year presented, category, nominee of the award, and the result of the nomination
Award ceremony	Year	Category	Nominee / Work	Result	Ref.
KBS Drama Awards	2020	Excellence Award, Actor in a Miniseries	Lee Jae-wook	Won	
KBS Drama Awards	2020	Best Couple Award	Lee Jae-wook and Go Ara	Nominated	
KBS Drama Awards	2020	Best Supporting Actor	Kim Joo-hun	Nominated	
KBS Drama Awards	2020	Best Supporting Actress	Ye Ji-won	Nominated	
Seoul International Drama Awards	2021	Outstanding Korean Drama OST	"Like A Dream" (SinB of GFriend)	Nominated	
Seoul International Drama Awards	2021	Outstanding Korean Drama OST	"We Already Fell In Love" (Miyeon and Minnie of (G)I-dle)	Nominated	
Seoul International Drama Awards	2021	Outstanding Korean Drama	Do Do Sol Sol La La Sol	Nominated	
Korea Broadcasting Awards	2021	Popularity Award	Do Do Sol Sol La La Sol	Nominated	
Seoul International Drama Awards	2020	Outstanding Korean Actor	Lee Jae-wook	Nominated	
