= Lee Jae-wook =

South Korean actor and model (born 1998)

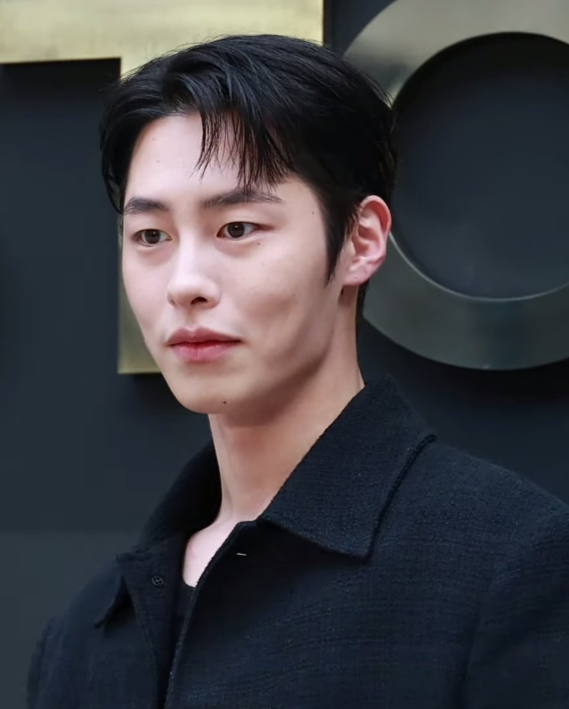
- Lee in July 2024
- Born: May 10, 1998 (age 28); Seoul, South Korea
- Education: Chung-Ang University (Department of Theater and Film)
- Occupations: Actor; model
- Years active: 2018–present
- Agent: Log Studio
- Height: 187 cm (6 ft 2 in)
- Awards: Full list

Korean name
- Hangul: 이재욱
- RR: I Jaeuk
- MR: I Chaeuk
- Website: logstudio.kr

Lee Jae-wook (Korean: 이재욱; born May 10, 1998) is a South Korean actor and model. He made his television debut in Memories of the Alhambra (2018–2019) and his film debut in The Battle of Jangsari (2019). He first gained recognition with Extraordinary You (2019) and Do Do Sol Sol La La Sol (2020), before achieving greater prominence with Alchemy of Souls (2022–2023).

== Education ==
Lee Jae-wook attends Chung-Ang University's Programme of Theater and Film. As of January 2023, he is taking a leave of absence.

== Career ==
=== 2018: Career beginnings ===
In December 2018, Lee started his acting career as a supporting character in the hit tvN television series Memories of the Alhambra as a hacker-programmer, starring Hyun Bin, whose agency VAST Entertainment recruited him immediately. In 2020, his photoshoot for the magazine The Masterpiece alongside actress Park Lee-hyun and fellow labelmate went viral. It was taken in the summer of 2018, before his official acting debut.

=== 2019: Rise in popularity ===
In June 2019, Lee joined the main cast of tvN's Search: WWW alongside Lee Da-hee, which became a hot topic every episode. The sales of Cine21's over-the-month issue of "2019 Rising Star" surged because of Lee, who gained popularity for his role in the drama. In September of the same year, he made a successful big screen debut in the war film The Battle of Jangsari. In October of the same year, he played as the second male lead in MBC's Extraordinary You as the female lead's childhood friend-fiancé. The show's success earned Lee the title of Best New Actor at the 2019 MBC Drama Awards, and he was also nominated for Best New Actor – Television at the 56th Baeksang Arts Awards.

=== 2020–present: Transition to lead roles and breakthrough ===
In February 2020, Lee was cast in a supporting role in the JTBC television series When The Weather Is Fine alongside Yang Hye-ji. In May of the same year, he was cast as the main male lead in the KBS2 television series Do Do Sol Sol La La Sol as the male counterpart of the main protagonist, played by Go Ara. He won the Excellence Award for Actor in a Miniseries for his outstanding performance in this drama at the KBS Drama Awards. He was also awarded Rookie of the Year and Actor of the Year – Rookie at the Asia Artist Awards and the 18th Brand of the Year Awards, respectively. Lee is recognized and commended for his serious and diverse acting range. Before the year ended, he appeared in a cameo role as his former drama character from Extraordinary You in tvN's True Beauty alongside Kim Hye-yoon.

In April 2021, Lee signed with C-JeS Entertainment, after his contract with the previous agency had expired. In May of the same year, he made a special appearance in the Netflix series Move to Heaven.

In June 2022, Lee returned to the small screen with the tvN period fantasy drama Alchemy of Souls alongside Jung So-min. In the same month, he appeared in a cameo role as an actor in the Disney+ series Kiss Sixth Sense. In October, he was awarded the Global Excellence Award at the Korea Drama Awards for his contribution globally to the Hallyu wave. He was also honored with the Asia Special Award at the 17th Asia Model Awards. In December of the same year, he reprised his role as Jang Uk in Alchemy of Souls: Light and Shadow, alongside Go Youn-jung. At the end of 2022, he then won the Best Actor Award at the Asia Artist Awards.

In 2025, Lee starred in Netflix's mystery historical television series Dear Hongrang opposite Jo Bo-ah. It is based on Tangeum: Swallowing Gold by Jang Da-hye and was produced by Studio Dragon.

== Endorsements ==
In February 2020, Lee became the new model for the contemporary casual brand AD HOC and the street casual brand N DOZEN. He has worked with brands such as Prada and Lancôme, as well as promoted Dior, Nike, Berluti, Armani, Zegna, EX NIHILO, and Fendi. He has been featured in many prominent fashion publications. In January 2023, Lee became the new model for the scalp care brand ScalpMed. In February 2023, Lee was selected as the brand model for the skin care brand La Mer.

== Filmography ==
Key
| † | Denotes films that have not yet been released |

=== Film ===
| Year | Title | Role | Notes | Ref. |
|---|---|---|---|---|
| 2019 | The Battle of Jangsari | Lee Gae-tae | | |
| 2023 | Kill Boksoon | young Cha Min-kyu | Cameo | |

=== Television series ===
| Year | Title | Role | Notes | Ref. |
|---|---|---|---|---|
| 2018–2019 | Memories of the Alhambra | Marco Han | | |
| 2019 | Search: WWW | Seol Ji-hwan | | |
| 2019 | Extraordinary You | Baek Kyung | | |
| 2020 | When the Weather Is Fine | Lee Jang-woo | | |
| 2020 | Do Do Sol Sol La La Sol | Sunwoo Joon | | |
| 2020 | True Beauty | Baek Kyung | Cameo (episode 4) | |
| 2021 | Move to Heaven | Kim Soo-cheol | Cameo (episode 3–7) | |
| 2022 | Kiss Sixth Sense | 'Haru' actor | Cameo (episode 3, 5, 9) | |
| 2022–2023 | Alchemy of Souls | Jang Uk | Part 1–2 | |
| 2023–2024 | Death's Game | Cho Tae-sang | Cameo (episode 3) | |
| 2024 | The Impossible Heir | Han Tae-oh | | |
| 2025 | Dear Hongrang | Hong Rang | | |
| 2025 | Last Summer | Baek Do-ha / Baek Do-young | | |
| 2026 | Boyfriend on Demand | Doctor | Cameo (episode 4, 6) | |
| 2026 | Doctor on the Edge | Do Ji-ui | | |
| 2026 | Dead-End Job | Hyuk-jun | | |

=== Television shows ===
| Year | Title | Role | Notes | Ref. |
|---|---|---|---|---|
| 2025–present | Fresh Off the Sea | Main cast | Season 2 | |

== Ambassadorship ==
| Year | Organization / Event | Notes | Ref. |
|---|---|---|---|
| 2022 | Korea Tourism Organization | Honorary Public Relations Ambassador | |

== Awards and nominations ==
Name of the award ceremony, year presented, category, nominee of the award, and the result of the nomination
| Award ceremony | Year | Category | Nominee / Work | Result | Ref. |
|---|---|---|---|---|---|
| APAN Star Awards | 2021 | Best New Actor | Extraordinary You | Nominated | |
| APAN Star Awards | 2021 | Popular Star Award, Actor | Extraordinary You | Nominated | |
| Asia Artist Awards | 2020 | Rookie of the Year | Lee Jae-wook | Won | |
| Asia Artist Awards | 2022 | Popularity Award – Actor | Lee Jae-wook | Nominated | |
| Asia Artist Awards | 2022 | Best Actor Award | Alchemy of Souls | Won | |
| Asia Model Awards (Note: Asia Model Awards is an annual ceremony that recognizes Asia's top models and celebrities.) | 2022 | Asia Special Award | Alchemy of Souls | Won | |
| Baeksang Arts Awards | 2020 | Best New Actor – Television | Extraordinary You | Nominated | |
| Brand of the Year Awards (Note: Brand of the Year Awards is an awards ceremony hosted by the Korean Consumer Brand Committee, overseen by the Korean Consumer Forum and the Korea Economic Daily.) | 2020 | Actor of the Year – Rookie | Lee Jae-wook | Won | |
| Dong-A.com's Pick | 2019 | Haeju Award | Lee Jae-wook | Won | |
| KBS Drama Awards | 2020 | Excellence Award, Actor in a Miniseries | Do Do Sol Sol La La Sol | Won | |
| KBS Drama Awards | 2020 | Best Couple Award | Lee Jae-wook (with Go Ara); Do Do Sol Sol La La Sol | Nominated | |
| Korea Broadcasting Awards (Note: Korea Broadcasting Awards is held every year by the Korea Broadcasting Association to commemorate Broadcasting Day.) | 2021 | Popularity Award | Do Do Sol Sol La La Sol | Nominated | |
| Korea Drama Awards | 2022 | Global Excellence Award | Alchemy of Souls | Won | |
| Korea First Brand Awards | 2023 | Rising Star Award | Lee Jae-wook | Nominated | |
| MBC Drama Awards | 2019 | Best New Actor | Extraordinary You | Won | |
| MBC Drama Awards | 2019 | Best Couple Award | Lee Jae-wook (with Kim Hye-yoon and Rowoon); Extraordinary You | Nominated | |
| Seoul International Drama Awards | 2021 | Outstanding Korean Actor | Do Do Sol Sol La La Sol | Nominated | |
