= Today's Webtoon =

2022 South Korean television series

- Promotional poster
- Hangul: 오늘의 웹툰
- RR: Oneurui weptun
- MR: Onŭrŭi wept'un
- Genre: Coming-of-age
- Created by: Studio S
- Based on: Jūhan Shuttai! by Naoko Matsuda
- Written by: Cho Ye-rang; Lee Jae-eun
- Directed by: Jo Soo-won; Kim Young-hwan
- Starring: Kim Se-jeong; Choi Daniel; Nam Yoon-su
- Country of origin: South Korea
- Original language: Korean
- No. of episodes: 16

Production
- Production companies: Binge Works; Studio N

Original release
- Network: SBS TV
- Release: July 29 – September 17, 2022

Today's Webtoon (Korean: 오늘의 웹툰) is a South Korean television series starring Kim Se-jeong, Choi Daniel, and Nam Yoon-su. It is a remake of a Japanese drama, which was based on the manga series Jūhan Shuttai!. It aired from July 29 to September 17, 2022, on SBS TV's Fridays and Saturdays at 22:00 (KST) for 16 episodes. It is also available for streaming on Viu in selected regions.

== Synopsis ==
Today's Webtoon tells the story of On Ma-eum (Kim Se-jeong), a former judo athlete, who struggles to adapt to her new job as webtoon editor after retiring as an athlete due to an injury.

== Cast ==
=== Main ===
- Kim Se-jeong as On Ma-eum

A rookie contract employee of the webtoon editorial department. She has a large appetite, a great sense of smell, and cauliflower ears typical of a fighter as a former standing member for the judo national team. On Ma-eum had to quit her athletic career when an unfortunate accident during a match tore her ankle ligament, but she begins to dream anew as a webtoon editor.

- Choi Daniel as Seok Ji-hyung

An unpredictable deputy editor with an unreadable poker face who becomes a dependable mentor for On Ma-eum. Although he can be brutally honest, he's also a supportive editor who takes good care of his colleagues. Nevertheless, outside of work, he shows a more clumsy side with his various charms and silly jokes.

- Nam Yoon-su as Goo Jun-yeong

A member of the sales team. He gradually grows to be more like On Ma-eum, who sincerely puts her heart and soul into everything, while looking back on himself.

=== Supporting ===
==== People around On Ma-eum ====
- Ko Chang-seok as On Gi-bong
- Hwang Young-hee as Hwang Mi-ok
- Yoon Seo-ah as On Nu-ri

==== Neon Webtoon Editorial Department ====
- Park Ho-san as Jang Man-cheol
- Yang Hyun-min as Kwon Young-bae
- Kang Rae-yeon as Ki Yu-mi
- Ahn Tae-hwan as Choi Doo-hee

==== Webtoon writers ====
- Kim Kap-soo as Baek Eo-jin
- Kim Do-hoon as Shin Dae-ryuk
- Jeon Hye-yeon as Guo-ah
- Ha Yul-ri as Pomme
- Im Chul-soo as Na Gang-nam
- Baek Seok-kwang as Lim Dong-hee
- Son Dong-woon as Oh Yoon
- Jang Sung-yoon as Lee Woo-jin

==== Others ====
- Baek Joo-hee as Yoon Tae-hee
- Ha Do-kwon as Heo Kwan-young
- Nam Bo-ra as Jang Hye-mi
- Jin Ye-sol as Ji Han-seul

=== Extended ===
- Kim Yong-seok as Ma Hae-gyu
- Jeon Jun-ho as Lee Woo-jin's older brother
- Seo Yoon-ah as Goo Ae-ri
- Jung Eun-pyo as Mo Young-soo
- Woo Jung-won as Kim Young-shin
- Jeon Chae-eun as Ma Yu-na
- Kim Soo-jin as Kang Kyung-ja

=== Special appearances ===
- Hwang Hee as Ahn Gyu-jin
- Park Tae-joon as New webtoon writer
- Meow as New webtoon writer
- Weeekly

== Viewership ==
Today's Webtoon : South Korea viewers per episode (thousands)

Season	Episode number																Average
Season	1	2	3	4	5	6	7	8	9	10	11	12	13	14	15	16	Average
1	735	611	682	605	613	N/A	N/A	N/A	N/A	N/A	N/A	N/A	N/A	N/A	N/A	N/A	N/A

Source: Audience measurement performed nationwide by Nielsen Korea.

Average TV viewership ratings
Ep.	Original broadcast date	Average audience share	
Ep.	Original broadcast date	Nielsen Korea	
Ep.	Original broadcast date	Nationwide	Seoul
1	July 29, 2022	4.1% (16th)	4.0% (17th)
2	July 30, 2022	3.1% (22nd)	N/A
3	August 5, 2022	3.6% (20th)	3.6% (19th)
4	August 6, 2022	3.1% (21st)	3.6% (19th)
5	August 12, 2022	3.4% (20th)	3.7% (17th)
6	August 13, 2022	2.8% (25th)	N/A
7	August 19, 2022	2.5% (27th)	N/A
8	August 20, 2022	2.2% (30th)	N/A
9	August 26, 2022	2.9% (24th)	N/A
10	August 27, 2022	1.5% (43rd)	N/A
11	September 2, 2022	2.3% (29th)	N/A
12	September 3, 2022	2.0% (36th)	N/A
13	September 9, 2022	2.0% (40th)	N/A
14	September 10, 2022	1.9% (41st)	N/A
15	September 16, 2022	2.4% (26th)	N/A
16	September 17, 2022	1.6% (45th)	N/A
Average		2.6%	—
In the table above, the blue numbers represent the lowest published ratings and the red numbers represent the highest published ratings.; N/A denotes ratings that were not released.

== Accolades ==
Name of the award ceremony, year presented, category, nominee(s) of the award, and the result of the nomination
Award ceremony	Year	Category	Nominee / Work	Result	Ref.
Korea Drama Awards	2022	Best New Actor	Kim Do-hoon	Won	
Korea Drama Awards	2022	Best Supporting Actor	Park Ho-san	Won	
SBS Drama Awards	2022	Scene Stealer Award	Im Chul-soo	Won	
SBS Drama Awards	2022	Best Supporting Actor in a Miniseries Romance/Comedy Drama	Park Ho-san	Nominated	
SBS Drama Awards	2022	Top Excellence Award, Actor in a Miniseries Romance/Comedy Drama	Choi Daniel	Nominated	
