= Hwang Min-hyun =

South Korean singer and actor (born 1995)

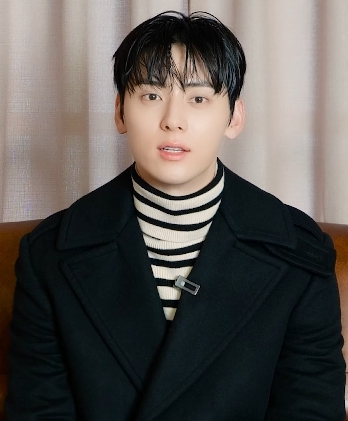
- Hwang in November 2023
- Born: August 9, 1995 (age 31); Busan, South Korea
- Education: School of Performing Arts Seoul; Inha University; Hanyang University Institute for Future Talents
- Occupations: Singer; songwriter; actor
- Musical career
- Genres: K-pop; R&B; dance
- Years active: 2012–present
- Labels: Pledis; YMC (Note: As a member of Wanna One only.); Swing
- Formerly of: Wanna One; NU'EST

Korean name
- Hangul: 황민현
- RR: Hwang Minhyeon
- MR: Hwang Minhyŏn

Signature
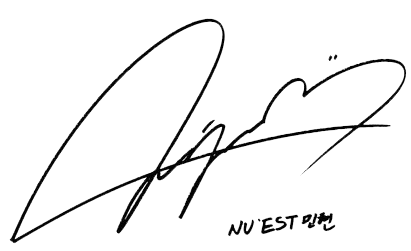

Hwang Min-hyun (Korean: 황민현; born August 9, 1995), known mononymously as Minhyun, is a South Korean singer, songwriter, and actor. He began his career, debuting as a member of the South Korean boy band NU'EST in March 2012. In 2017, he participated in second season of Produce 101 and finished ninth place, becoming a member of Wanna One. Following Wanna One's disbandment, Hwang returned to NU'EST, remaining until the group's disbandment in 2022. He is a solo artist and actor signed under Pledis Entertainment.

== Career ==
=== Pre-debut ===
Hwang was scouted by South Korean entertainment agency Pledis Entertainment at the age of fifteen and became a trainee for almost two years. Prior to his debut, he became more well known after appearing in Orange Caramel's music video for their single "Shanghai Romance". He also made appearances in labelmates' music releases as a member of 'Pledis Boys'.

=== 2012–2016: NU'EST ===
On March 15, 2012, Hwang debuted as a member of NU'EST. He also appeared at the 2012–13 Seoul Fashion Week as a model for designer Park Yoon-soo's fashion show 'Big Park'. In 2015, Hwang was featured in indie artist Fromm's new track, "Aftermath". In 2016, Pledis Entertainment released Minhyun and JR's music video for "Daybreak", which is part of NU'EST's fifth mini album Canvas.

=== 2017–2018: Produce 101 and Wanna One ===
In 2017, NU'EST halted all promotions while JR, Baekho, Minhyun, and Ren participated in the second season of the series Produce 101.

In the third episode of the series, Hwang picked the members for 'Sorry Sorry Team 2', for which he was nicknamed 'producer' and 'CEO Hwang' by online commenters. In the "Position" challenge, he covered I.O.I's "Downpour" and the view count of his fancam reached 1 million within three days. In the "Concept" challenge, he was the center of "Never" team, which charted at number one in multiple music charts. Hwang ranked 9th of the season, garnering 862,719 votes and officially debuted as a member of Wanna One with exclusively promotions for 1.5 years.

=== 2019–2022: Return to NU'EST, solo activities and Wanna One reunion stage ===
While his Wanna One contract officially ended on December 31, 2018, Hwang did not officially return to NU'EST until the end of January 2019. This was due to Pledis and Swing Entertainment coming to an agreement that allowed him to attend scheduled year-end shows and award ceremonies throughout January 2019 as a member of Wanna One. His final Wanna One activity before returning to NU'EST was a final concert (titled Therefore) that was held across four days, ending on January 27, 2019.

Hwang and the rest of NU'EST announced their contract renewal with Pledis Entertainment on February 1, 2019. On March 15, Hwang official releases since returned to NU'EST with special digital single "A Song For You" to celebrate the seventh anniversary of their debut. On April 3, he released a digital solo single "Universe" as the pre-release single for the group's upcoming EP Happily Ever After. The single is accompanied by the music video shot in Budapest and Milan. Later in the year, Hwang made his musical theater debut as Count Axel von Fersen in the Seoul revival of the musical Marie Antoinette, which ran from August until November 2019.

On June 26, 2020, Hwang was cast in the lead role of Go Eun-taek in the JTBC drama Live On, which aired from November 2020 to January 2021.

In April 2021, Pledis Entertainment announced that he was cast in the upcoming tvN drama Alchemy of Souls, written by the Hong Sisters. After days of speculation, it was confirmed on November 15, 2021, that Hwang, alongside the other members of Wanna One (except for Lai Kuan-lin), will reunite for a special stage performance at the 2021 Mnet Asian Music Awards in December 2021. While CJ E&M announced that there are talks of a Wanna One reunion concert and subsequent albums, Pledis Entertainment clarified that Hwang will perform with Wanna One only at the 2021 Mnet Asian Music Awards and will return to NU'EST and his solo projects afterward. On December 5, 2021, Hwang released the single "I'll Be With You Every Day" (모든 날을 너와 함께 할게), his first solo original soundtrack, for the MBC series The Red Sleeve.

On February 28, 2022, Pledis announced that NU'EST's exclusive contract will expire on March 14, 2022 with only Hwang and Baekho have renewed their contracts with the agency, signifying the group's disbandment. On March 24, 2022, Hwang confirmed a four-year contract extension with Italian luxury brand Moncler. On November 28, Hwang was announced to cast in upcoming drama My Lovely Liar, written by Seo Jung-eun, plans to aired in 2023.

=== 2023–present: Solo debut ===
On January 20, 2023, Pledis confirmed that Hwang would make his solo debut the next month. He released his first mini-album titled Truth or Lie on February 27, 2023. On October 8, 2023, Hwang held his first solo concert in the Philippines at the New Frontier Theater.

== Discography ==
=== Extended plays ===
List of extended plays, with selected details, chart positions, and sales
Title	Details	Peak chart positions	Sales
Title	Details	KOR	Sales
Truth or Lie	Released: February 27, 2023; Label: Pledis Entertainment; Formats: CD, digital download; Track listing: 1. "Honest"; 2. "Hidden Side"; 3. "Crossword"; 4. "Perfect Type"; 5. "Smile"; 6. "Cube"	2	KOR: 84,462

=== Singles ===
List of singles, with selected chart positions, showing year released, sales, and album name
Title	Year	Peak chart positions		Sales	Album
Title	Year	KOR		Sales	Album
Title	Year	Circle	Hot (Note: The Kpop Hot 100 was launched on August 25, 2011, and was discontinued on July 16, 2014. The chart was re-established on June 4, 2017, but was discontinued on April 30, 2022.)	Sales	Album
As lead artist
"Daybreak" (with JR)	2016	91	—N/a	KOR: 25,874	Canvas
"Universe" (별의 언어)	2019	88	87	—N/a	Happily Ever After
"Again" (다시 만나는 날에)	2022	— (Note: "Again" did not enter the Circle Digital Chart, but peaked at number 18 and 39 on Circle BGM Chart and Circle Download Chart, respectively.)	—N/a	—N/a	Votiz vol.3
"Hidden Side"	2023	115	—N/a	—N/a	Truth or Lie
As featured artist
"Love Letter" (Son Dam-bi, After School feat. Ara, Hyelim, Baekho, Junghyun)	2011	37	43	KOR: 398,062	Happy Pledis 2nd Album
"Aftermath" (후유증) (FROMM feat. Minhyun)	2015	—	—N/a	—N/a	Moonbow
"Chase Love Hard" (Bolbbalgan4 feat. Minhyun)	2023	36	—N/a	—N/a	Love.zip
"—" denotes a recording that did not chart or was not released in that region.

=== Soundtrack appearances ===
List of soundtrack appearances, with selected chart positions, showing year released, and album name
Title	Year	Peak positions	Album
Title	Year	KOR	Album
"Moonlight" (모든 밤 너에게)	2021	123	Love Revolution OST
"I'll Be with You Every Day" (모든 날을 너와 함께 할게)	2021	— (Note: "I'll Be with You Every Day" did not enter the Gaon Digital Chart, but peaked at number 5 and 33 on Gaon BGM Chart and Gaon Download Chart, respectively.)	The Red Sleeve OST Part 4
"You look pretty" (예뻐 보여)	2022	—	세기말 풋사과 보습학원 OST
"Just Watching You" (나무 (바라만 본다 2))	2022	—	Alchemy of Souls: Light and Shadow OST
"—" denotes a recording that did not chart or was not released in that region.

== Filmography ==
=== Film ===
Year	Title	Role	Notes	Ref.
2016	Their Distance	Nam Sang-soo	Japanese film	

=== Television series ===
Year	Title	Role	Notes	Ref.
2020–2021	Live On	Go Eun-taek		
2022–2023	Alchemy of Souls	Seo Yul	Part 1–2	
2023	My Lovely Liar	Kim Do-ha		

=== Web series ===
Year	Title	Role	Ref.
2025	Study Group	Yoon Ga-min	

=== Television shows ===
Year	Title	Role	Notes	Ref.
2013–2014	Reckless Family 3	Himself		
2017	Produce 101 Season 2	Contestant		
2019	UHSN	MC	with JR	
2023	Boys Planet	Star Master		

=== Hosting ===
Year	Title	Notes	Ref.
2022	KCON 2022 JAPAN	September 19 to 22	
2022	7th Asia Artist Awards (Gala Show)	with Nako Yabuki	

== Musical theatre ==
Musical play and concert performances
Year	Title		Role	Venue	Date	Ref.	
Year	2019	Marie Antoinette	Role	Venue	Date	Ref.	Count Axel Von Fersen
2023	AAA's Beginning Concert 'Male God'	AAA'의 비기닝 콘서트 '男神(남신)'	Himself	Yokohama Pia Arena MM	July 8, 2023		

== Accolades ==
=== Awards and nominations ===
Name of the award ceremony, year presented, category, nominee of the award, and the result of the nomination
Award ceremony	Year	Category	Nominee / Work	Result	Ref.
Asia Artist Awards	2021	Potential Award (Actor)	Live On	Won	
Asia Artist Awards	2022	Popularity Award – Actor	Hwang Min-hyun	Nominated	
Asia Artist Awards	2022	New Wave Award (Actor)	Alchemy of Souls	Won	
Asia Artist Awards	2022	Best Acting Performance	Alchemy of Souls	Won	
Korea Musical Awards	2020	Male Rookie Award	Marie Antoinette	Nominated	
Melon Music Awards	2019	Best Dance Track (Male)	"Universe"	Nominated	
Stagetalk Audience Choice Awards (SACA) (Note: StageTalk Audience's Choice Awards (SACA) is theater and musical award festival that decides the winner based on pure votes from fans of the performance.)	2019	Best New Actor	Marie Antoinette	Won	
CJ ENM Visionary	2026	2026 Visionary	Hwang Min-hyun	Won	

=== Listicles ===
Name of publisher, year listed, name of listicle, and placement
Publisher	Year	Listicle	Placement	Ref.
GQ Korea	2019	Men of the Year	Placed	
