= Alchemy of Souls =

2022 South Korean television series

- Promotional poster for part 1
- Also known as: Alchemy of Souls: Light and Shadow (part 2)
- Hangul: 환혼
- Hanja: 還魂
- RR: Hwanhon
- MR: Hwanhon
- Genre: Fantasy; Romance; Period drama; Action
- Written by: Hong Jung-eun; Hong Mi-ran
- Directed by: Park Joon-hwa
- Starring: Lee Jae-wook; Jung So-min; Go Youn-jung; Hwang Min-hyun
- Music by: Nam Hye-seung
- Country of origin: South Korea
- Original language: Korean
- No. of episodes: 30

Production
- Executive producers: Jang Jeong-do; Lee Yong-ok; Lee Soo-beom
- Producer: Ahn So-jeong
- Editors: Park In-cheol, Jeong Ha-rim
- Running time: 60–70 minutes
- Production companies: Studio Dragon (part 1–2); High Quality (part 1); TS Narincinema (part 2)
- Budget: ₩40 billion

Original release
- Network: tvN
- Release: June 18, 2022 – January 8, 2023

Alchemy of Souls (Korean: 환혼) is a South Korean television series starring Lee Jae-wook, Jung So-min, Go Youn-jung, and Hwang Min-hyun. Written by the Hong sisters, it depicts the stories of young mages dealing with heaven and earth. It aired on tvN from June 18, 2022, to January 8, 2023, every Saturday and Sunday at 21:10 (KST) for 30 episodes. It is also available for streaming on TVING and Netflix in selected regions.

The series was divided into two parts: Part 1 aired from June 18 to August 28, 2022, for 20 episodes, while Part 2 (Alchemy of Souls: Light and Shadow) (Note: Korean: 환혼: 빛과 그림자; RR: Hwanhon: Bitgwa Geurimja) aired from December 10, 2022, to January 8, 2023, for 10 episodes.

== Series overview ==
| Part | Episodes | Originally released | | Average viewership (in millions) |
| Part | Episodes | First released | Last released | Average viewership (in millions) |
|---|---|---|---|---|
| 1 | 20 | June 18, 2022 | August 28, 2022 | 1.619 |
| 2 | 10 | December 10, 2022 | January 8, 2023 | 1.887 |

== Synopsis ==
=== Part 1 ===
Set in a fictional country called Daeho, the series is about the love and growth of young mages as they overcome their twisted fates due to a forbidden magic spell known as the "Alchemy of Souls", which allows souls to switch bodies.

It follows the story of an elite warrior named Naksu whose soul is accidentally trapped inside the weak body of Mu-deok. She becomes entangled with Jang Uk, who is from a noble family, and becomes his servant and master, teaching Jang Uk her skills as they both fall in love with each other.

=== Part 2 ===
Three years after a tragedy, engineered by Jin Mu, that led Mu-deok to run wild and kill innocent people, Jang Uk, who returned from the dead as a result of the powerful Ice Stone inside his body, becomes a ruthless hunter of soul shifters and becomes increasingly isolated due to his heartbreak over the death of his love—Mu-deok. He then meets the mysterious heiress of Jinyowon, Jin Bu-yeon, whose words frequently echo those of Naksu.

== Cast ==
=== Main ===
- Lee Jae-wook as Jang Uk
  - Park Sang-hoon as young Jang Uk
- Jung So-min as Mu-deok / Naksu (after alchemy of souls) / Jin Bu-yeon (Mu-deok's birth name)
- Go Youn-jung as Naksu (before alchemy of souls) / Cho Yeong (real name) / Jin Bu-yeon (in part 2)
  - Gu Yoo-jung as young Naksu
- Hwang Min-hyun as Seo Yul
  - Moon Seong-hyun as young Seo Yul

=== Supporting ===
==== Jang family ====
- Oh Na-ra as Maidservant Kim Yeon
- Joo Sang-wook as Jang Gang
- Bae Gang-hee as Do-hwa
- Jang Tae-min as Servant Lee

==== Seo family ====
- Do Sang-woo as Seo Yun-oh

==== Songrim ====
- Yoo Jun-sang as Park Jin
- Yoo In-soo as Park Dang-gu
- Lee Ha-yool as Sang-ho

==== Sejukwon ====
- Lee Do-kyung as Heo Yeom
- Hong Seo-hee as Heo Yun-ok
- Jung Ji-an as Soon-yi
- Kim Yong-jin as Physician Seo

==== Cheonbugwan ====
- Jo Jae-yoon as Jin Mu
- Choi Ji-ho as Gil-ju
- Cha Yong-hak as Yeom-su
- Lee Ji-hoo as Cha Beom
- Lee Bong-jun as Gu Hyo
- Joo Min-soo as Han Yeol

==== Jin family (Jinyowon) ====
- Park Eun-hye as Jin Ho-gyeong
- Joo Seok-tae as Jin Woo-tak
- Arin as Jin Cho-yeon
- Yoon Hae-bin as young Jin Bu-yeon

==== Royal family ====
- Shin Seung-ho as Go Won
- Choi Kwang-il as Go Soon
- Kang Kyung-hun / Shim So-young as Seo Ha-sun
- Park Byung-eun as Go Seong
- Lee Ki-seop as Eunuch Oh
- Jeong Ji-sun as Eunuch Kim

==== Chwiseollu ====
- Park So-jin as Joo-wol

==== Others ====
- Im Chul-soo as Lee Cheol (Master Lee)
- Seo Hye-won as So-yi
- as Yong-pil
- Woo Hyun as Monk Ho-yeon

=== Extended ===
- Jeon Hye-won as Ae-hyang
- Yoon Seo-hyun as Cho Chung
- Shim Jae-hyun as a thug
- Kim Cheol-yoon as Byeong-gu

=== Special appearances ===
- Yeom Hye-ran as a mysterious middle-aged woman
- Yegyul Band
- Kim Hyun-sook as Maidservant Park
- Jang Sung-beom as Master Kang
- Lee Jun-hyeok as a merchant
- Kim Dae-gon as a merchant
- Lee Chae-min as a merchant

== Production ==
=== Development ===
Preparations for the series, as well as program discussion with tvN, started in 2019 under the working title Can This Person Be Translated (이 사람 통역이 되나요; I saram tongyeogi doenayo).

=== Casting ===
In January 2021, Park Hye-su's agency revealed that the actress auditioned for Alchemy of Souls. In June, it was announced that actor Joo Sang-wook was offered a role in the series.

The female lead role was first confirmed to be played by Park Hye-eun. However, in July 2021, she decided to leave the series after a mutual agreement with the production team. It was stated that although Park is a rookie actress, she prepared hard for the series, but felt a lot of pressure about playing the main character of a big project. The role was then offered to actress Jung So-min. Jung and director Park Joon-hwa previously worked together in 2017 TV series Because This Is My First Life.

Line-up for the lead stars consisting of Lee Jae-wook, Jung So-min, Hwang Min-hyun, Shin Seung-ho, Yoo Jun-sang, Oh Na-ra and Jo Jae-yoon was officially announced by tvN on March 3, 2022. On March 21, Yoo In-soo, Arin, Park Eun-hye, Lee Do-kyung and Im Chul-soo were announced to have joined the cast.

After the end of part 1 in August 2022, the female lead actress Jung So-min was replaced by Go Youn-jung for part 2, after she previously portrayed the original identity for Jung's character in a cameo in part 1.

=== Filming ===
In August 2021, production companies Studio Dragon and High Quality signed an agreement with Mungyeong to build a filming site in Maseong-myeon worth ₩5 billion for the production of Alchemy of Souls.

Filming locations include Nongwoljeong Pavilion in Hwarim-dong Valley, Hamyang County, Goseokjeong Pavilion in Cheorwon County, and CJ ENM Studio Center in Paju. The tree shown in the fictional place called Danhyanggok is located on the lower reaches of the Geumgang River in Garimseong Fortress, Buyeo County. Post-production began as filming began in the summer of 2021.

On October 6, 2021, it was announced that filming of the series was canceled for that week after a staff member tested positive for COVID-19 on the morning of the 5th. All production crew members subsequently underwent PCR tests. Some staff members who were classified as close contacts went into self-quarantine, even though they tested negative for the contagion.

It was reported that filming for the second part of the series had started by July 2022, and was completed on October 6.

== Original soundtrack ==
=== Part 1 ===
Original soundtrack for Part 1

Alchemy of Souls (Original Television Soundtrack)

Soundtrack album by Various Artists
- Released: August 28, 2022
- Genre: Soundtrack
- Length: 1:27:00
- Languages: Korean; English
- Labels: Genie Music; Stone Music Entertainment

The album peaked at number 18 on weekly Circle Album Chart and as of September 2022, 8,906 copies have been sold.

Part 1

Released on June 26, 2022
| No. | Title | Lyrics | Music | Artist | Length |
|---|---|---|---|---|---|
| 1. | "Scars Leave Beautiful Trace" (상처는 아름다운 흔적이 되어) | Nam Hye-seung; Janet Suhh | Nam Hye-seung; Jeon Jong-hyuk; Heo Seok; Lee Jae-woo | Car, the Garden | 3:33 |
| 2. | "Scars Leave Beautiful Trace" (상처는 아름다운 흔적이 되어; Inst.) | | Nam Hye-seung; Jeon Jong-hyuk; Heo Seok; Lee Jae-woo | | 3:33 |
| Total length: | | | | | 7:06 |

Part 2

Released on July 3, 2022
| No. | Title | Lyrics | Music | Artist | Length |
|---|---|---|---|---|---|
| 1. | "Aching" (아리운) | Nam Hye-seung; Kim Kyung-hee | Nam Hye-seung; Kim Kyung-hee | Kassy | 4:11 |
| 2. | "Aching" (아리운; Inst.) | | Nam Hye-seung; Kim Kyung-hee | | 4:11 |
| Total length: | | | | | 8:22 |

Part 3

Released on July 10, 2022
| No. | Title | Lyrics | Music | Artist | Length |
|---|---|---|---|---|---|
| 1. | "Just Watching You" (바라만 본다) | Nam Hye-seung; Kim Kyung-hee | Nam Hye-seung; Kim Kyung-hee | Jeong Se-woon | 4:02 |
| 2. | "Just Watching You" (바라만 본다; Inst.) | | Nam Hye-seung; Kim Kyung-hee | | 4:02 |
| Total length: | | | | | 8:04 |

Part 4

Released on July 17, 2022
| No. | Title | Lyrics | Music | Artist | Length |
|---|---|---|---|---|---|
| 1. | "Raindrops" (빗방울) | Nam Hye-seung; Janet Suhh | Nam Hye-seung; Park Sang-hee | Gummy | 3:54 |
| 2. | "Raindrops" (빗방울; Inst.) | | Nam Hye-seung; Park Sang-hee | | 3:54 |
| Total length: | | | | | 7:48 |

Part 5

Released on July 24, 2022
| No. | Title | Lyrics | Music | Artist | Length |
|---|---|---|---|---|---|
| 1. | "You're Everything to Me" (온통 그대뿐인 나죠) | Nam Hye-seung; Park Jin-ho | Nam Hye-seung; Park Jin-ho | Shin Yong-jae | 4:10 |
| 2. | "You're Everything to Me" (온통 그대뿐인 나죠; Inst.) | | Nam Hye-seung; Park Jin-ho | | 4:10 |
| Total length: | | | | | 8:20 |

Part 6

Released on July 31, 2022
| No. | Title | Lyrics | Music | Artist | Length |
|---|---|---|---|---|---|
| 1. | "Breath" (숨결) | Nam Hye-seung; Janet Suhh | Nam Hye-seung; Park Sang-hee | Kim Na-young | 4:27 |
| 2. | "Breath" (숨결; Inst.) | | Nam Hye-seung; Park Sang-hee | | 4:27 |
| Total length: | | | | | 8:54 |

Part 7

Released on August 21, 2022
| No. | Title | Lyrics | Music | Artist | Length |
|---|---|---|---|---|---|
| 1. | "Love Letter (with You)" (연서 (with You)) | Nam Hye-seung; Kim Kyung-hee | Nam Hye-seung; Kim Kyung-hee | Big Naughty | 3:29 |
| 2. | "Love Letter (with You)" (연서 (with You); Inst.) | | Nam Hye-seung; Kim Kyung-hee | | 3:29 |
| Total length: | | | | | 6:58 |

=== Part 2 ===
Original soundtrack for Part 2

Part 1

Released on December 18, 2022
| No. | Title | Lyrics | Music | Artist | Length |
|---|---|---|---|---|---|
| 1. | "Blue Flower" (푸른꽃) | Nam Hye-seung; Kim Kyung-hee | Nam Hye-seung; Kim Kyung-hee | Lia (Itzy) | 3:48 |
| 2. | "Blue Flower" (푸른꽃; Inst.) | | Nam Hye-seung; Kim Kyung-hee | | 3:48 |
| Total length: | | | | | 7:36 |

Part 2

Released on December 25, 2022
| No. | Title | Lyrics | Music | Artist | Length |
|---|---|---|---|---|---|
| 1. | "Tree (Just Watching You 2)" (나무 (바라만 본다 2)) | Nam Hye-seung; Kim Kyung-hee | Kim Kyung-hee; Nam Hye-seung | Hwang Min-hyun | 4:03 |
| 2. | "Tree (Just Watching You 2)" (나무 (바라만 본다 2); Inst.) | | Kim Kyung-hee; Nam Hye-seung | | 4:03 |
| Total length: | | | | | 8:06 |

Part 3

Released on January 1, 2023
| No. | Title | Lyrics | Music | Artist | Length |
|---|---|---|---|---|---|
| 1. | "I'm Sorry" | Nam Hye-seung; Janet Suhh | Nam Hye-seung; Jeon Jong-hyuk; Heo Seok | Ailee | 4:16 |
| 2. | "I'm Sorry" (Inst.) | | Nam Hye-seung; Jeon Jong-hyuk; Heo Seok | | 4:16 |
| Total length: | | | | | 8:32 |

== Viewership ==
Alchemy of Souls ranked second, tied with Our Blues, in streaming for Netflix Korea TV show category from January to December 22, 2022.

Alchemy of Souls : South Korea viewers per episode (millions)

| Part | Episode number | | | | | | | | | | | | | | | | | | | | Average |
| Part | 1 | 2 | 3 | 4 | 5 | 6 | 7 | 8 | 9 | 10 | 11 | 12 | 13 | 14 | 15 | 16 | 17 | 18 | 19 | 20 | Average |
|---|---|---|---|---|---|---|---|---|---|---|---|---|---|---|---|---|---|---|---|---|---|
| 1 | 1.294 | 1.516 | 1.275 | 1.760 | 1.321 | 1.632 | 1.347 | 1.804 | 1.416 | 1.817 | 1.305 | 1.769 | 1.564 | 1.926 | 1.680 | 1.926 | 1.815 | 2.359 | 1.984 | 2.410 | 1.696 |
| 2 | 1.648 | 1.933 | 1.812 | 2.126 | 1.676 | 1.967 | 1.518 | 2.054 | 1.871 | 2.267 | – | | | | | | | | | | 1.887 |

Source: Audience measurement performed nationwide by Nielsen Korea.

Average TV viewership ratings
| Ep. | Original broadcast date | Average audience share (Nielsen Korea) | |
| Ep. | Original broadcast date | Nationwide | Seoul |
Part 1
| 1 | June 18, 2022 | 5.205% (1st) | 4.833% (1st) |
| 2 | June 19, 2022 | 5.872% (1st) | 6.047% (1st) |
| 3 | June 25, 2022 | 5.288% (1st) | 5.315% (1st) |
| 4 | June 26, 2022 | 6.841% (1st) | 6.878% (1st) |
| 5 | July 2, 2022 | 5.352% (1st) | 5.253% (1st) |
| 6 | July 3, 2022 | 6.639% (1st) | 6.880% (1st) |
| 7 | July 9, 2022 | 5.311% (1st) | 5.158% (1st) |
| 8 | July 10, 2022 | 6.826% (1st) | 6.694% (1st) |
| 9 | July 16, 2022 | 5.204% (1st) | 5.329% (1st) |
| 10 | July 17, 2022 | 6.958% (1st) | 6.835% (1st) |
| 11 | July 23, 2022 | 4.989% (1st) | 4.908% (1st) |
| 12 | July 24, 2022 | 7.091% (1st) | 7.032% (1st) |
| 13 | July 30, 2022 | 6.290% (1st) | 6.008% (1st) |
| 14 | July 31, 2022 | 7.600% (1st) | 7.484% (1st) |
| 15 | August 6, 2022 | 6.610% (1st) | 6.710% (1st) |
| 16 | August 7, 2022 | 7.453% (1st) | 7.544% (1st) |
| 17 | August 20, 2022 | 7.566% (1st) | 7.767% (1st) |
| 18 | August 21, 2022 | 9.295% (1st) | 9.793% (1st) |
| 19 | August 27, 2022 | 7.915% (1st) | 8.121% (1st) |
| 20 | August 28, 2022 | 9.218% (1st) | 9.903% (1st) |
Part 2
| 21 | December 10, 2022 | 6.719% (1st) | 7.852% (1st) |
| 22 | December 11, 2022 | 7.743% (1st) | 8.808% (1st) |
| 23 | December 17, 2022 | 7.176% (1st) | 8.236% (1st) |
| 24 | December 18, 2022 | 8.458% (1st) | 9.366% (1st) |
| 25 | December 24, 2022 | 7.134% (1st) | 7.665% (1st) |
| 26 | December 25, 2022 | 8.237% (1st) | 9.206% (1st) |
| 27 | December 31, 2022 | 6.644% (1st) | 6.654% (1st) |
| 28 | January 1, 2023 | 8.605% (1st) | 10.078% (1st) |
| 29 | January 7, 2023 | 8.218% (1st) | 8.853% (1st) |
| 30 | January 8, 2023 | 9.651% (1st) | 10.603% (1st) |
| Average | | 6.665% | 7.099% |
| Special | August 14, 2022 | 3.225% (1st) | 3.446% (1st) |
In the table above, the blue numbers represent the lowest ratings and the red numbers represent the highest ratings.; This series aired on a cable channel/pay TV which normally has a relatively smaller audience compared to free-to-air TV/public broadcasters (KBS, SBS, MBC and EBS).

== Awards and nominations ==
Name of the award ceremony, year presented, category, nominee of the award, and the result of the nomination
| Award ceremony | Year | Category | Nominee / Work | Result | Ref. |
|---|---|---|---|---|---|
| Asia Model Awards (Note: Asia Model Awards is an annual ceremony that recognizes Asia's top models and celebrities.) | 2022 | Asia Special Award | Lee Jae-wook | Won | |
| Asia Model Awards | 2022 | Rising Star Award, Actor Category | Arin | Won | |
| Baeksang Arts Awards | 2023 | Best Screenplay – Television | Hong Jung-eun and Hong Mi-ran | Nominated | |
| Korea Drama Awards | 2022 | Best Director | Park Joon-hwa | Won | |
| Korea Drama Awards | 2022 | Global Excellence Award | Lee Jae-wook | Won | |
| Korea Drama Awards | 2022 | Top Excellence Award, Actress | Jung So-min | Nominated | |
| Scene Stealer Festival | 2023 | Scene Stealers of the Year | Oh Na-ra | Won | |
| Scene Stealer Festival | 2023 | Scene Stealers of the Year | Im Chul-soo | Won | |
