= Im Chul-soo =

South Korean actor

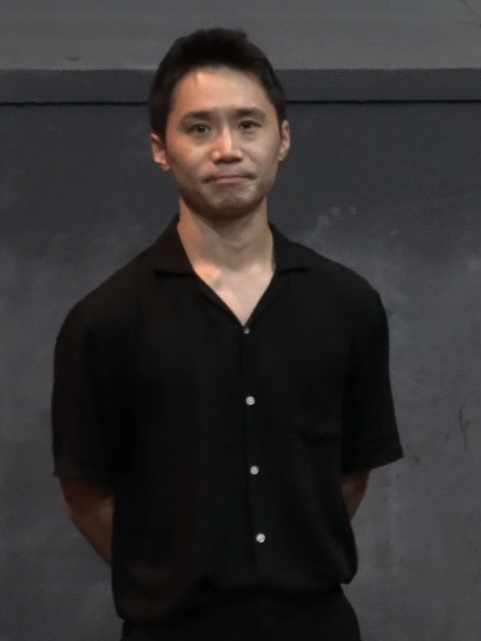
- Im in 2019
- Born: August 22, 1984 (age 42); South Korea
- Other name: Lim Cheol-soo
- Education: Department of Theater and Film Dankook University (on Leave)
- Occupation: Actor
- Years active: 2004–present
- Agent: HighZium Studio

Korean name
- Hangul: 임철수
- RR: Im Cheolsu
- MR: Im Ch'ŏlsu

Im Chul-soo (Korean: 임철수; born August 22, 1984), is a South Korean actor. He started his acting career onstage in both stage plays and musicals, moving to dramas in 2016. He is well known for his supporting roles in a number of popular Korean dramas such as Crash Landing on You, Vincenzo, Alchemy of Souls, Today's Webtoon, and Gyeongseong Creature.

== Career ==
Im Chul-soo began to work in the Seoul theatre community Daehak-ro in 2004, after taking a leave of absence from the Department of Performing Film at Dankook University. He became more noticed in 2008 with the musical Adolescence, Hero in 2009, The Disappearance of Crown Prince in 2011 and appeared in The Goddess is Watching in 2013.

In 2018, Lee Ji-hye, the producer of the musical Infinite Power, adapted and composed a webtoon of the same name with actor Im in mind for the role of Jin Ki-han. In the encore, Im Chol-soo shares the role of Jin Ki-han with Ahn Ji-hwan. The musical opened on the 24th at Chungmu Arts Center's Black Theater in Sindang-dong, Jung-gu, Seoul. It revolves around the story of Jin Ki-han, job seeker Jang Seon-jae, and dance major dropout Kim Sol, who reside together in the boarding house of inventor Han Won-sik.

After over 10 years of experience in theatre, Im made his small screen debut in 2016 with tvN's Reply 1988. Since then, he has appeared in dramas such as tvN's Signal (2016), SBS's Six Flying Dragons (2016), tvN's Mr. Sunshine (2018), and SBS's Your Honor (2018). He has also showcased his acting skills in works like Dear Me (2018) and has been gradually building his filmography by appearing in popular works such as the drama Mr. Sunshine.

In 2020, Im gained recognition for his role as Park Soo-chan, the life insurance manager of Yoon Se-ri (played by Son Ye-jin), in tvN's Crash Landing on You. That recognition broadened with his role as Ahn Ki-seok in the 2021 drama Vincenzo, as Master Lee in the 2022/2023 Hong sisters' drama Alchemy of Souls, and as Mr. Oh in the 2023/2024 drama Gyeongseong Creatures.

In 2026, Im reunited with the Hong sisters, Kim Seon-ho, and Go Youn-jung for a special appearance in Netflix original series Can This Love Be Translated? A romantic comedy that follows the relationship between Joo Ho-jin (Kim Seon-ho), a multilingual interpreter, and Cha Mu-hee (Go Youn-jung) a top actress. Im acted as Kim Jeong-su PD, main director of dating show Romantic Trip.

== Filmography ==
Key
| † | Denotes films that have not yet been released |

=== Films ===
| Year | Title | Role | Notes |
|---|---|---|---|
| 2010 | Finding Mr. Destiny | Unknown | Cameo |
| 2016 | Unforgettable | Young man at the fish market | extra |
| 2016 | Musudan | North Korean Army Officer | |
| 2016 | The Great Actor | Devil's Blood Production Team | |
| 2017 | Along with the Gods: The Two Worlds | Firefighter | extra |
| 2018 | Along with the Gods: The Last 49 Days | Won Maek's aide | |
| 2018 | The Great Battle | Soldier | extra |
| 2019 | Romang | Young Kim Ga | Cameo |
| 2019 | By Quantum Physics: A Nightlife Venture | Kim Sang-soo | |
| 2021 | Three Sisters | College student | Cameo |
| 2021 | Hostage: Missing Celebrity | Bang Ga | Cameo |

=== Television series ===
| Year | Title | Role | Notes | Ref. |
|---|---|---|---|---|
| 2015 | The Jingbirok: A Memoir of Imjin War | Song Yoo-jin | | |
| 2015 | Six Flying Dragons | Soldier | | |
| 2015 | Reply 1988 | Gangster | Cameo | |
| 2016 | Signal | Informant | Cameo (Episode 6–7, 9) | |
| 2018 | Mr. Sunshine | Jeon Seung-jae | | |
| 2018 | Your Honor | Park Jae-ho | | |
| 2019 | Nokdu Flower | Kim Seung-ho | | |
| 2019 | Crash Landing on You | Park Su-chan | | |
| 2020 | Dr. Romantic 2 | Loan Shark | | |
| 2020 | Stranger 2 | Im Jung-gyu | | |
| 2021 | Vincenzo | Ahn Ki-seok | | |
| 2021 | Voice 4: Judgment Hour | Jang Soo-chul | Cameo | |
| 2021 | Chimera | Hong Young-sik | Cameo (Episode 1–2) | |
| 2022 | Today's Webtoon | Na Kang-nam | | |
| 2022–2023 | Alchemy of Souls | Master Lee | Part 1–2 | |
| 2022–2023 | Unlock My Boss | | Cameo (Episode 12) | |
| 2023 | Gyeongseong Creature | Mr. Oh | Season 1 | |
| 2024 | Queen of Tears | Private investigator | Cameo (Episode 1–2, 7) | |
| 2024 | My Sweet Mobster | Go Yang-hui | | |
| 2024 | A Virtuous Business | Park Jong-sun | | |
| 2024 | When the Phone Rings | Kang Yeong-woo | | |
| 2025 | Our Unwritten Seoul | Lee Choong-goo | | |
| 2025 | Spirit Fingers | Jang Dong-geon (Brown Finger) | | |
| 2026 | Can This Love Be Translated? | Kim Jeong-su | | |
| 2026 | Undercover Miss Hong | Cha Jung-il | | |
| 2026 | Perfect Crown | Sales manager of Castle Beauty | Cameo (Episode 1–2) | |

=== Web series ===
| Year | Title | Role | Notes | Ref. |
|---|---|---|---|---|
| 2016 | The Ordinary Life of Ms. 'O'! | Ex-boyfriend | Season 1–2 | |
| 2018 | Oh, Yeojeong: Summer | Cheol | | |

== Stage ==
=== Musical ===
List of Musical(s)
| Year | Title | | Role | Theater | Date | Ref. |
| Year | English | Korean | Role | Theater | Date | Ref. |
|---|---|---|---|---|---|---|
| 2004 | Young Jang Jun-ha | 청년 장준하 | | Sejong Center for the Performing Arts Grand Theater | August 18–21 | |
| 2008 | Adolescence | 사춘기 | Yongyong Brothers | Daehak-ro Installation Theatre Jeongmiso | August 15 to October 12 | |
| 2009 | Hero | 영웅 | Chiba | LG Art Center | October 26 to December 3 | |
| 2011 | The Chorus – Oedipus | 더 코러스 - 오이디푸스 | Lion from Corinth | LG Art Centre | April 26 to March 1 | |
| 2011 | The Disappearance of the Crown Prince | 왕세자 실종사건 | Hanaegwan | Gyeonghuigung Palace Sungjeongjeon | September 1–21 | |
| 2012 | Winter Fantasia | 겨울환상곡 | | Daehakro Algwahaek Small Theater(Details) | January 7 to February 14 | |
| 2013 | The Goddess is Watching | 여신님이 보고 계셔 | Lee Chang-seop | Chungmu Art Centre Small Theatre Blue | January 15 to March 10 | |
| 2013 | The Goddess is Watching | 여신님이 보고 계셔 | Lee Chang-seop | Art One Theatre 1 | May 3 to August 25 | |
| 2013 | The Goddess is Watching | 여신님이 보고 계셔 | Lee Chang-seop | MBC Lotte Art Hall, Busan | August 30 to September 1 | |
| 2013 | The Goddess is Watching Talk concert | 여신님이 보고 계셔 토크콘서트 | Lee Chang-seop | Art One Theatre 1 | August 5 | |
| 2013 | 2013 Seoul Musical Festival Closing Show | 2013 서울뮤지컬페스티벌 폐막갈라쇼 | Himself | Chungmu Art Centre Grand Theatre | August 12 | |
| 2013 | The Chorus - Oedipus | 더 코러스 - 오이디푸스 | Jeonmunga | LG Art Centre | October 9–20 | |
| 2013 | Joint Security Area (JSA) | 공동경비구역 JSA | Jeon Woo-jin warrior | Daehak-ro Musical Center Space Piccolo | December 7–15 | |
| 2014 | Joint Security Area (JSA) | 공동경비구역 JSA | Jeon Woo-jin (Soldier) | Dongsung Art Centre Dongsung Hall | February 27 to April 27 | |
| 2014 | Joint Security Area (JSA) | 공동경비구역 JSA | Jeon Woo-jin (Soldier) | Dongsung Art Centre Dongsung Hall | April 27 | |
| 2014 | Joint Security Area (JSA) | 공동경비구역 JSA | Jeon Woo-jin (Soldier) | Jeju Art Centre | June 20–21 | |
| 2014 | Joint Security Area (JSA) | 공동경비구역 JSA | Jeon Woo-jin (Soldier) | Suwon SK Atrium Grand Performance Centre | July 25–26 | |
| 2014 | Joint Security Area (JSA) | 공동경비구역 JSA | Jeon Woo-jin (Soldier) | Goyang Oullim Nuri Oullim Theatre | August 8–9 | |
| 2014 | The Chorus – Oedipus | 더 코러스 - 오이디푸스 | Oedipus | Victoria Theatre (Note: Singapore International Festival of Arts) | August 22–23 | |
| 2014 | Deep-rooted Tree | 뿌리 깊은 나무 | Chae Yoon | National Museum of Korea Theatre Yong | October 9–18 | |
| 2015 | The Disappearance of the Crown Prince | 왕세자 실종사건 | Gu-dong | Daehak-ro Arts Theatre Grand Theatre | August 7–16 | |
| 2018 | Infinite Power | 무한동력 | Jin Ki-han | Chungmu Art Center Medium Theater Black | April 24 to July 1 | |
| 2019 | Paris Bakery | 빠리빵집 | Cheol-su | Wooran Cultural Foundation Wooran 2 Hall | January 12–14 | |

=== Theater ===
List of Stage Play(s)
| Year | Title | | Role | Theater | Date | Ref. |
| Year | English | Korean | Role | Theater | Date | Ref. |
|---|---|---|---|---|---|---|
| 2004 | The Seagull | 갈매기 | Medvezenko | Seoul Arts Centre CJ Towol Theatre | April 14 to March 2 | |
| 2009 | The 39 Steps | 39 계단 | Multiman 2 | Dongsung Art Centre Dongsung Hall | February 21 to March 29 | |
| 2009 | The 39 Steps | 39 계단 | Multiman 2 | Sejong Centre for the Performing Arts M Theatre | July 30 to August 30 | |
| 2010 | Tournament | 토너먼트 | Mr. Choi | LG Art Centre | April 20–25 | |
| 2011 | Youth 18 to 1 | 청춘 18대1 | Kang Dae-woong | Sinchon The Stage | August 4–28 | |
| 2012 | Romeo & Juliet | 로미오 & 줄리엣 | Mercurius | Acquaintance Theatre (Nine . Al and Nuclear Theatre) | April 19–20 | |
| 2012 | Hamlet 6 - Next to Samyang-dong Chrysanthemum | 햄릿6 - 삼양동 국화 옆에서 | | Namsan Arts Centre Drama Centre | November 6–25 | |
| 2013–2014 | Almost, Maine | 올모스트 메인 | Chad | Art Plaza 4, Daehak-ro | November 11 to January 19 | |
| 2014 | Almost, Maine | 올모스트 메인 | Chad | Art Madang Building 4 | January 23 to February 23 | |
| 2014 | Judo Boy | 유도소년 | Joseph | Art One Theater Hall 3 | April 26 to July 13 | |
| 2015 | Judo Boy | 유도소년 | Joseph | Art One Theater Hall 3 | February 7 to May 3 | |
| 2015 | Judo Boy | 유도소년 | Joseph | Ansan Arts Center Dalmaji Theater | May 21–24 | |
| 2015 | Judo Boy | 유도소년 | Joseph | Osan Culture and Arts Center Grand Theater | October 2–3 | |
| 2015 | Judo Boy | 유도소년 | Joseph | Daegu Bongsan Cultural Center Grand Performance Hall (Gaon Hall) | October 9–10 | |
| 2015 | Judo Boy | 유도소년 | Joseph | Uijeongbu Arts Center Small Theater | October 23–24 | |
| 2016 | Almost, Maine | 올모스트 메인 | East, Lendall, Chad, Dave | Sangmyung Art Hall 1 | January 8 to July 3 | |
| 2016 | Hello! UFO | 안녕! 유에프오 | Sang-hyeon | Art One Theatre 1 | October 5–30 | |
| 2016 | Cue | 큐 | Xingfei | Art One Theatre 2 | May 10 to July 3 | |
| 2016 | I Crossed the Line a Bit and Got Reprimanded | 살짝 넘어갔다가 얻어맞았다 | Ja-su | LG Art Centre | November 5–18 | |
| 2016–2017 | The Bunker Trilogy | 벙커 트릴로지 | Soldier 3 | Hongik University Daehak-ro Art Centre Small Theatre | December 6 to February 19 | |
| 2017 | Tike | 티케 | Brother Lee Heon | Goyang Aram Nuri Sarasae Theatre, Goyang | December 21–23 | |
| 2021 | Perfetti Sconosciuti | 완벽한 타인 | Pepe | Sejong Centre for the Performing Arts M Theatre | May 18 to August 1 | |
| 2021 | Perfetti Sconosciuti | 완벽한 타인 | Pepe | GS Caltex Yeulmaru Grand Theatre, Yeosu | August 13–14 | |
| 2023–2024 | Realise Happiness | 행복을 찾아서 | Jeong Ji-yong | Daehak-ro TOM 2 | December 5 to February 18 | |
| 2024 | 2024 Theatre 10,000 won 1 〈Realise Happiness〉 | 2024 연극만원1 〈행복을 찾아서〉 | Jeong Ji-yong | Seongnam Art Centre Ensemble Theatre | March 8–10 | |

== Awards and nominations ==
Name of the award ceremony, year presented, category, nominee of the award, and the result of the nomination
| Award ceremony | Year | Category | Nominee / Work | Result | Ref. |
|---|---|---|---|---|---|
| SBS Drama Awards | 2022 | Scene Stealer Award | Today's Webtoon | Won | |
| Scene Stealer Festival | 2023 | Main Prize (Bonsang) | Vincenzo; Alchemy of Souls | Won | |
