= Daddy You, Daughter Me =

- Hangul: 아빠는 딸
- RR: Appaneun ttal
- MR: Appanŭn ttal
- Directed by: Kim Hyung Hyup
- Screenplay by: Choi Yoon-mi; Kim Ji-sun; Jin Na-ri; Jo Sung-woo
- Based on: Papa to Musume no Nanokakan by Takahisa Igarashi
- Produced by: Kim Yoon-suk; Jeong Yu-dong
- Starring: Yoon Je-moon; Jung So-min
- Cinematography: Jeong Gi-won; Jang Nam-cheol
- Edited by: Moon In-dae
- Production company: A Kimchi Movie Production
- Distributed by: Megabox Plus M
- Release date: April 12, 2017
- Running time: 115 minutes
- Country: South Korea
- Language: Korean
- Box office: US$4.6 million

Daddy You, Daughter Me (Korean: 아빠는 딸) is a 2017 South Korean comedy film directed by Kim Hyung Hyup. It is based on the 2006 Japanese novel Papa to Musume no Nanokakan by Takahisa Igarashi.

== Plot ==
The titular father and daughter swap bodies after a car accident. 'Dad is Daughter' will depict a special story about a father and daughter in a lot of troubles. Father and daughter will recover love and trust for each other by looking into each other's personal life as well as inner thoughts.

== Cast ==
- Yoon Je-moon as Won Sang-tae
- Jung So-min as Won Do-yeon
  - Lee Seol-ah as young Do-yeon 1
  - Kwak Ji-hye as young Do-yeon 2
- Lee Il-hwa as Mom
- Shin Goo as Grandpa
- Lee Mi-do as Deputy Na Yoon-mi
- Heo Ga-yoon as Ahn Kyung-mi
- Min Do-hee as Bae Jin-young
- Kang Ki-young as Deputy Joo Jang-won
- G.O as Director Jeon
- Park Hyuk-kwon as Jeong Byeong-jin
- Lee Yoo-jin as Kang Ji-oh
- Jang Won-young as President Kwon
- Kim Jong-gu as Chairman
- Kang Seung-wan as Section chief Kang
- Kim In-kwon (special appearance)
- Park Myeong-su (special appearance)
- Lee Ho-joon (special appearance)
