= Lee Go-eun =

South Korean actress (born 2009)

- Born: 6 November 2009 (age 16); Incheon, South Korea
- Occupation: Actress
- Agent: Big Smile Entertainment

Korean name
- Hangul: 이고은
- RR: I Goeun
- MR: I Koŭn

Lee Go-eun (Korean: 이고은; born November 6, 2009) is a South Korean actress. Lee starred as daughter of Lee Jang-woo's character in the Korean drama Rosy Lovers (2015).

== Career ==
In January 2022, Lee Go-eun signed an exclusive contract with Big Smile Entertainment.

== Filmography ==
=== Television series ===
| Year | Title | Role | Network | Ref. |
|---|---|---|---|---|
| 2014 | Gap-dong | young Yang Seon-joo | tvN | |
| 2014 | Angel Eyes | young Park Hye-joo | SBS | |
| 2014 | Three Days | Kim Ki-beom's granddaughter | SBS | |
| 2014 | Make Your Wish | young Song Yi-hyun | MBC | |
| 2014 | Misaeng: Incomplete Life | Park So-mi | tvN | |
| 2015 | Rosy Lovers | Park Cho-rong | MBC | |
| 2016 | The Dearest Lady | Park Sae-rom | MBC | |
| 2016 | The Master of Revenge | young Kim Da-hae | KBS2 | |
| 2016 | KBS Drama Special: "Pinocchio's Nose" | child Da-jung | KBS2 | |
| 2017 | Black | Hyo Jin (Tiffany's daughter) | OCN | |
| 2018 | Secret Mother | Lee Chae-rin | SBS | |
| 2019 | Flower Crew: Joseon Marriage Agency | young Gae-ttong | JTBC | |
| 2020 | Forest | young Jung Young-jae | KBS2 | |
| 2020 | Memorist | young Kim So-mi | tvN | |
| 2020 | Find Me in Your Memory | young Jung Seo-yeon | MBC | |
| 2020 | True Beauty | young Im Ju-kyung | tvN | |
| 2021 | Be My Dream Family | Minsol | KBS1 | |
| 2022 | The Golden Spoon | young Oh Yeo-jin | MBC | |

=== Film ===
| Year | Title | Role |
|---|---|---|
| 2015 | Alice: Boy from Wonderland | young Hye-joong |
| 2019 | Sunkist Family | Oh Jin-hae |

== Awards and nominations ==
Name of the award ceremony, year presented, category, nominee of the award, and the result of the nomination
| Award ceremony | Year | Category | Nominee / Work | Result | Ref. |
|---|---|---|---|---|---|
| KBS Drama Awards | 2021 | Best Young Actress | Be My Dream Family | Nominated | |
