= Park Joon-geum =

South Korean actress (born 1962)

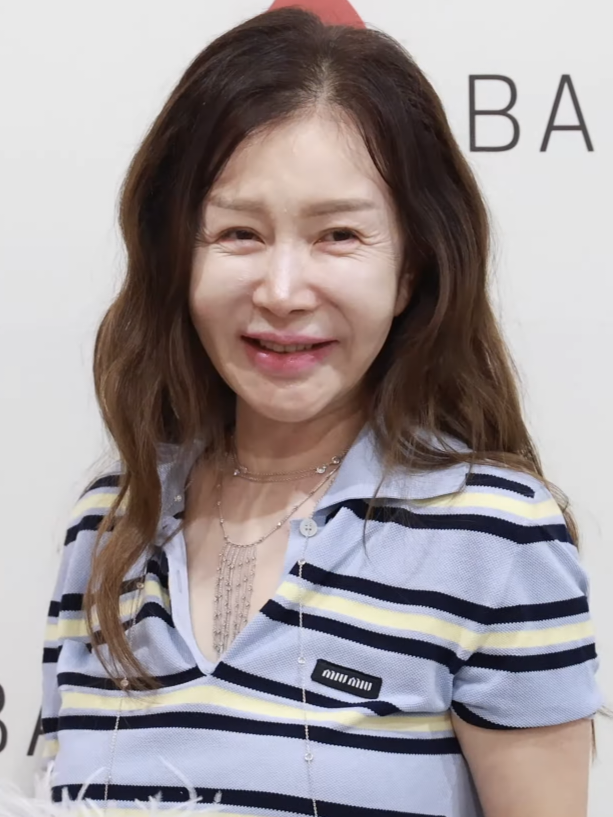
- Park in July 2024
- Born: 29 July 1962 (age 64); Chuncheon, Gangwon Province, South Korea
- Education: Kyung Hee University – Dance Department
- Occupations: Actor; visiting professor
- Years active: 1982–present
- Agent: IOK Company

Korean name
- Hangul: 박준금
- Hanja: 朴俊錦
- RR: Bak Jungeum
- MR: Pak Chun'gŭm

Park Joon-geum (Korean: 박준금; born 29 July 1962) is a South Korean actress. An alumnus of Kyung Hee University, Department of Dance, she is also a visiting professor in College of Culture and Arts Engineering, Kangwon National University. She made her acting debut in 1982 in KBS TV series Innocent love (순애). Better known for her role in TV series The Heirs (2013), she also appeared in; Secret Garden (2010), Rooftop Prince (2012), Queen of Mystery (2017), Marry Me Now (2018) and Never Twice (2019).

In 2018, she was awarded the "Top Excellence Award for an Actress in a Serial Drama" at the MBC Drama Awards for My Healing Love. She appeared in romance TV series Be My Dream Family in 2021.

== Filmography ==
=== Film ===
Year	Title	Role	Notes	Ref.
1985	The Day When Love Begins	Han Sang-hoon		
1987	Seven Generations	Nam Gi-nam		
2009	Bronze Medalist	Principal		
2009	A Dream Comes True	Kim Soon-ja		
2014	Granny's Got Talent	Mother in law		

=== Television series ===
Year	Title	Role	Notes	Ref.
2006	Sunok	Im Yae-bum	KBS TV Novel series	
2006-07	High Kick!	Seo Min-jeong's mom		
2010	Three Sisters	Shin Sook-ja		
2010	Secret Garden	Moon Boon-hong	Nominated for supporting actress award in 4th Korea Drama Awards	
2011	While You Were Sleeping	Mrs. Jang		
2012	Rooftop Prince	Yong Seol-hee, Dong-man's aunt		
2012	Standby	Park Joon-geum		
2013	A Hundred Year Legacy	Do Do-hee		
2013	Goddess of Marriage	Han Se-kyeong's mother		
2013	The Heirs	Jung Ji-suk		
2014	Emergency Couple	Yoon Seong-sook		
2014	Two Mothers	Bae Choo-Ja		
2015	Divorce Lawyer in Love	Ma Dong-mi		
2015	Mask	Mrs. Song Sung-hee		
2015	I Order You	Gook-dae's mother		
2015	Bubble Gum	Yi-seul's mother		
2016	Descendants of the Sun	Lee Chi-hoon's mother (episode 7, 11)		
2016	Memory	Jang Mi-rim		
2016	The Gentlemen of Wolgyesu Tailor Shop	Go Eun-sook		
2016	Gogh, The Starry Night	Madam Joo (Ep. 9)	Guest appearance	
2017	Queen of Mystery	Park Kyung-suk		
2017	Hospital Ship	Han Hee-sook		
2018	Queen of Mystery 2	Park Kyung-suk	Special appearance	
2018	Marry Me Now	Woo A-mi		
2018	My Healing Love	Kim I-bok		
2019	Never Twice	Do Do-hee		
2019	Perfume	Joo Hee-eun		
2020	Kingmaker: The Change of Destiny	Lee Deok-yoon		
2021	Be My Dream Family	Kang Mo-ran		
2022	Sponsor	President Lee	Special appearance	
2023	Doctor Cha	Kwak Ae-sim		

== Awards and nominations ==
Year	Award	Category	Work	Result	Ref.
2010	4th Korea Drama Awards	Best Supporting Actress	Secret Garden	Nominated	
2011	SBS Entertainment Awards	Best Variety Entertainer Award	Kim Yuna's Kiss & Cry	Won	
2017	36th MBC Drama Awards	Golden Acting Award, Actress in a Miniseries	Hospital Ship	Nominated	
2018	MBC Drama Awards	Excellence Award, Actress in a Soap Opera	My Healing Love	Won	
2021	KBS Drama Awards	Excellence Award, Actress in a Daily Drama	Be My Dream Family	Nominated	
2025	KBS Drama Awards	Best Supporting Actress	For Eagle Brothers	Won	
