= Choi Jung-woo =

South Korean actor (1957–2025)

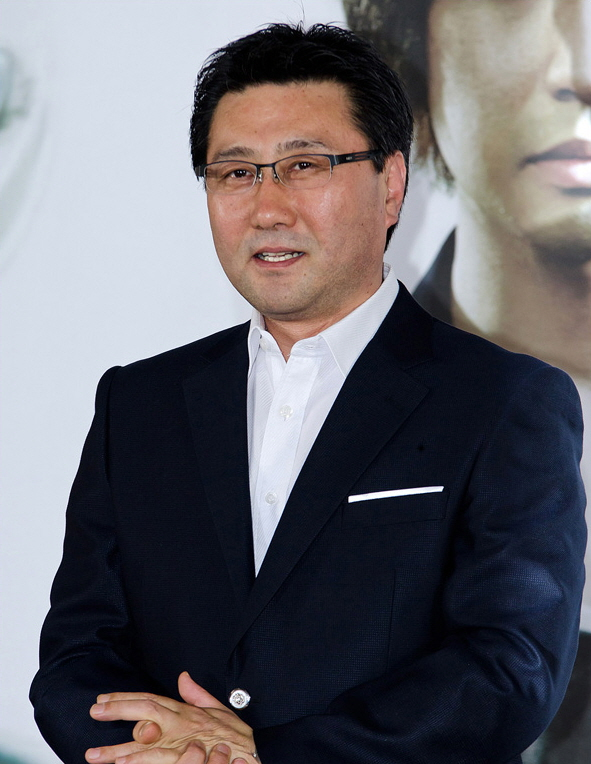
- Choi in June 2011
- Born: February 17, 1957; South Korea
- Died: May 27, 2025 (aged 68)
- Occupation: Actor
- Years active: 1975–2025
- Agent: GFP Entertainment

Korean name
- Hangul: 최정우
- Hanja: 崔廷宇
- RR: Choe Jeongu
- MR: Ch'oe Chŏngu

Choi Jung-woo (Korean: 최정우; February 17, 1957 – May 27, 2025) was a South Korean actor. He began his acting career in theater, then became active as a supporting actor in film and television, notably in the sitcom Standby and the procedural dramas Quiz of God and Dr. Frost.

Choi died on May 27, 2025, at the age of 68.

== Filmography ==
=== Film ===
Year	Title	Role
1996	Seven Reasons Why Beer; Is Better Than a Lover	Grandfather
1996	Two Cops 2	Film director
1997	Terrorist 2	Subordinate
2001	Indian Summer	Lawyer Hwang Byung-ho
2001	Yellow Hair 2	M's father
2001	Raybang	Director Choi
2002	Lovers' Concerto	Shim Soo-in's father
2004	Dance with the Wind	Squad leader Park
2005	Another Public Enemy	Representative Kim
2005	Sympathy for Lady Vengeance	Dong-hwa's father
2006	Arang	Autopsy doctor
2006	Hanbando	
2006	Like a Virgin	Company president
2006	Maundy Thursday	Uncle
2007	Big Bang	Section chief detective
2007	Soo	Detective squad chief of police department team 2
2007	Our Town	Detective Gu
2008	The Chaser	Flag bearer
2008	Living Together, Happy Together	Tae-hoon
2008	Girl Scout	Director Han
2008	Like Father, Like Son	Young-gyu
2008	Boy Director	Worker at Cheongryang-ri Station (cameo)
2009	Marine Boy	Gambling man (cameo)
2009	The Pot	Elder Park
2009	Sky and Ocean	Jung-hwan
2010	Secret Reunion	NIS department head
2010	Grand Prix	Ship caretaker (cameo)
2010	No Doubt	Sung-sik's father
2011	The Suicide Forecast	PB
2011	The Front Line	Colonel Choi
2012	Deranged	Minister of Health
2015	The Trip Around the World	Dispatch chief
2018	The Witch: Part 1. The Subversion	Teacher Goo
2023	The Childe	Han Chairman

=== Television series ===
Year	Title	Role	Notes/Ref.
2006	Alone in Love	Min Hyun-joong's father	
2007	Lee San, Wind of the Palace	Eunuch	
2007	Lobbyist	Admiral Lee Chul-ho	
2008	Strongest Chil Woo	King Injo	
2008	Painter of the Wind	Kim Gwi-ju	
2009	Brilliant Legacy	Park Tae-soo	
2009	Hero	Choi Il-doo	
2010	Prosecutor Princess	Ma Sang-tae	
2010	Bad Guy		
2010	Running, Gu	Jong-il	
2010	KBS Drama Special – "Reason"	Professor Lee	
2010	Queen of Reversals	Goo Ho-seung	
2010–12	Quiz of God	Jang Kyu-tae	
2011	Midas	Yoo Ki-joon	
2011	49 Days	Shin Il-shik	
2011	City Hunter	Chun Jae-man	
2011	Poseidon	Han Sang-goon	
2011	Deep Rooted Tree	Park Eun	
2011	Midnight Hospital	Goo Dong-man	
2012	Standby	Ryu Jung-woo	
2012	Phantom	Shin Kyung-soo	
2012	Seoyoung, My Daughter	Kang Ki-beom	
2013	Ad Genius Lee Tae-baek	Kang Han-chul	
2013	She Is Wow!	Park Ui-won	
2013	Master's Sun	Kim Gwi-do	
2013	A Little Love Never Hurts	Eun Hee-jae	
2014	Doctor Stranger	Moon Hyung-wook	
2014	My Secret Hotel	Lee Moo-yang	
2014	Dr. Frost	Chun Sang-won	
2015	The Invincible Lady Cha	Director Cha Jin-gyu	
2015	Unkind Ladies	Han Choong-gil	
2015	I Have a Lover	Baek Jun-sang	
2016	Goodbye Mr. Black	Seo Jin-tak	
2016	The Legend of the Blue Sea	Heo Il-joong	
2016	Five Enough	Jang Min-Ho	
2017	Judge vs. Judge	Sa Jeong-do	
2018	Marry Me Now	Yeon Chan-goo	
2019	The Secret Life of My Secretary	Do Min-ik's father	(cameo)
2020	Soul Mechanic	Lee Taek-kyung	
2020	Alice	Tae-yi's father	
2021	Sisyphus: The Myth	Hwang Hyun-seung	
2021	Be My Dream Family	Geum Jong-hwa	
2022	The Empire	Senior Ahn	
2022	Curtain Call	Cheol-jin	Cameo
2023	Stealer: The Treasure Keeper	Dr. Ko	
2024–25	The Tale of Lady Ok	Park Jun-gi	

== Theater ==
Year	Title	Role
1983	The Mousetrap	Detective Sergeant Trotter
1999	Today	Hwang Si-young
2000	Fat Pig	
2000	An Interesting Year	
	Generation After Generation	
2004	Sunday Seoul	
2005	Snowman	Jung-woo
	Cockscomb Flower	
2007	The Pillowman	
	Please Turn Off the Lights	
	Come and See Me	
2008	Blackbird	Ray
2010	The Most Beautiful Goodbye in the World	Dr. Jung

== Awards and nominations ==
Year	Award	Category	Nominated work	Result
1990	Seoul Theater Festival	Grand Prize (Daesang)		Won
1999	36th Dong-A Theatre Awards	Best Actor	Today	Won
2013	SBS Drama Awards	Special Acting Award, Actor in a Miniseries	Master's Sun	Nominated
2021	KBS Drama Awards	Excellence Award, Actor in a Daily Drama	Be My Dream Family	Nominated
