= Be My Dream Family =

2021 South Korean television daily drama

- Promotional poster
- Also known as: A Fool's Dream
- Hangul: 속아도 꿈결
- Lit.: Even if I'm Deceived, I'm Dreaming
- RR: Sogado kkumgyeol
- MR: Sogado kkumkyŏl
- Genre: Drama; Comedy; Family
- Created by: KBS Drama Division
- Written by: Yeo Myung-jae
- Directed by: Kim Jeong-gyoo
- Starring: Choi Jung-woo; Park Joon-geum; Wang Ji-hye; Hahm Eun-jung; Joo Ah-reum
- Country of origin: South Korea
- Original language: Korean
- No. of episodes: 120

Production
- Executive producer: Noh Sang-hoon (6 – 47) Hong Seok-gu (48 – 120) (KBS)
- Producer: Jang Min-seok
- Camera setup: Single-camera
- Running time: 30 minutes
- Production company: KBS Drama Division

Original release
- Network: KBS1
- Release: March 29 – October 1, 2021

Be My Dream Family (Korean: 속아도 꿈결) is a South Korean television series starring Choi Jung-woo, Park Joon-geum, Wang Ji-hye, Hahm Eun-jung, and Joo Ah-reum. The series, directed by Kim Jeong-gyoo and written by Yeo Myung-jae, revolves around two culturally different families becoming one when their parents remarry. The daily drama was premiered on KBS1 on March 29, 2021, and aired every weekday at 20:30 (KST) till October 1.

Although Be My Dream Family was consistently among the three most-watched television programs in South Korea every day, it drew the lowest viewership for KBS1's traditional 20:30 (KST) family drama time slot. Its ratings never increased from its pilot-episode figure of 18.4%, and it was the first in that time slot to never break the 20% mark. During Chuseok, the 111th and 112th episodes of Be My Dream Family drew nationwide ratings of 9.7% and 9.3%—the first time in 11 years that a KBS1 daily drama got single-digit ratings since Happiness in the Wind was defeated by a World Cup game. Lead actor Ryu Jin admitted that Be My Dream Family made a "new attempt" on the format and that it was "not the existing daily drama style," but thought there should still be "a drama that touches the heart."

== Synopsis ==
The series revolves around two families of Geum and Han, each with different views on familial duties. They meet when their parents remarry and become one family. It follows the conflict, understanding, and harmony of the extended family – showing meaning of a true family.

== Cast ==
=== Main ===
- Choi Jung-woo as Geum Jong-hwa: Sang-baek, Sang-goo, and Sang-min's 71-year-old father. He declares remarriage and operates an interior shop
- Park Joon-geum as Kang Mo-ran, a 65-year-old hairstylist who works at Moran Hair.
- Wang Ji-hye as Han Geu-roo: Mo-ran's eldest daughter, a 36-year-old woman who serves as editor-in-chief of a children's publishing house.
- Hahm Eun-jung as Han Da-bal, Mo-ran's second daughter and Geu-roo's sister who is 34 years old. She is a judo master and instructor.
- Joo Da-young as Min Ga-eun, Han Da-bal's 26-year-old sister-in-law who is a member of the design team of Arang Publishing House.

=== Supporting ===
- Ryu Jin as Geum Sang-baek, In Young-hye's 47-year-old husband and the Geum family's first son.
- Park Tam-hee as In Young-hye
  - Han Sung-yun as young In Young-hye (ep.7)

45 years old, physical therapist, Geum Sang-baek's wife, the Geum family's first daughter-in-law

- Im Hyung-joon as Geum Sang-goo, a 45-year-old broadcaster PD. He is Oh Min-hee's husband, Sang-baek's younger brother, the Geum family's second son.
- Yoon Hae-young as Oh Min-hee, an 48-year-old actress who is Geum Sang-goo's wife, the Geum family's second daughter-in-law.
- Lee Tae-gu as Geum Sang-min, the third son of Geum Jong-hwa who is a 33-year-old aspiring artist.
- Kim In-yi as Geum Min-ah, the eldest of the 20-year-old fraternal twins born to Geum Sang-baek and In Young-hye.
- Ok Jin-wook as Geum In-seo, Geum Sang-baek and In Young-hye's son as well as Geum Min-ah's fraternal twin brother.
- Lee Go-eun as Min Sol, Han Da-bal's eight-year-old daughter.
- Ha Ji-young as Kim Ji-yeon, a therapist.

Neighbors

- Park Jae-jung as Choi Ji-wan, a 41-year-old representative of a children's publishing company, where Han Geu-roo is editor-in-chief.
- Seo Woo-seung as Choi Yi-jae, Choi Ji-wan's eight-year-old son.
- Joo Jong-hyuk as Hyun Si-woon, a 36-year-old book publisher.
- Yang So-min as Ki Yoo-young
  - Kim Ye-byeol as young Ki Yoo-young

45 years old, a doctor in the department of rehabilitation medicine

- Cho Han-gyeol as Im Heon, Ki Yoo-young's 20-year-old spoiled son.
- Yoo Jang-young as Lee Je-moon, design team leader of Arang Publishing Company where Han Geu-roo is editor-in-chief.

== Production ==
Two celebrities made their acting comeback: Hahm Eun-jung after her last appearance in the 2018 TV series Lovely Horribly, Park Tam-hee after 2015 series Enchanting Neighbor, Choi Jung-woo and Park Joon-geum after three years; they starred in the 2018 series Marry Me Now. On February 25, 2021, Yang So-min was confirmed to play Yoo-Young Ki, a doctor in the department of rehabilitation medicine. Wang Ji-hye, Hahm Eun-jung, and Joo Ah-reum were confirmed to play the three leading characters of sisters in an extended family. On March 25, 2021, KBS World released a teaser and changed the title for international audience to Be My Dream Family.

== Original soundtrack ==
Be My Dream Family

Soundtrack album by Various
- Released: 2021
- Genre: Soundtrack
- Language: Korean
- Label: Five Senses Entertainment

=== Part 1 ===
Released on June 22, 2021
No.	Title	Lyrics	Music	Artist	Length
1.	"Love is Like a Dream" (같은 사랑)	Kim Ji-na	Jo Yoon-jung	Im Jun-hyeok	3:29
2.	"Symphony for Dreams" (심포니)	Kim Ji-na	Jo Yoon-jung	Jo Yoon-jung	2:20
3.	"First Love (String for Dreams)" (첫사랑)	Kim Ji-na	Jo Yoon-jung	Jo Yoon-jung	2:25
4.	"Sea World" (시월드)	Kim Ji-na	Jo Yoon-jung, Jeong Sa-bi	Jo Yoon-jung, Jeong Sa-bi	1:15
5.	"Arisong Waltz" (아리송 꿈결)	Kim Ji-na	Hong Dong-pyo	Hong Dong-pyo	3:03
6.	"The Eve of a Storm" (폭풍전야)	Kim Ji-na	Jo Yoon-jeong, Jeong Sa-bi	Jo Yoon-jeong, Jeong Sa-bi	1:17
7.	"As You Wish" (당신이 원하는대로)	Kim Ji-na	Lee Jong-han	Lee Jong-han	2:44
8.	"We Are a Family" (우리는 가족입니다)	Kim Ji-na	Jiae Kim	Jiae Kim	2:44
9.	"Sweet Dreams" (따스한 꿈결)	Kim Ji-na	Joran	Joran	2:09
10.	"Sortie (Ready to go)" (출격)	Kim Ji-na	Jo Yoon-jeong	Jo Yoon-jeong	1:36
11.	"Be My Dream Family" (속아도 꿈결)	Kim Ji-na	Jo Yoon-jeong	Jo Yoon-jeong	1:12
12.	"Love is Like a Dream" (Inst.)		Jo Yoon-jeong	Jo Yoon-jeong	3:30
Total length:					27:45

=== Part 2 ===
Released on July 15, 2021
No.	Title	Lyrics	Music	Artist	Length
1.	"I Do Love You" (널 좋아한단 말야)	Shoon	Jo Yoon-jung	Go Seung-hyung
2.	"Good Day Today" (오늘도 좋은날)		Jiae Kim	Kim Ji-ae
3.	"The Great Director" (대감독)		Master	Master
4.	"Picnic Day" (소풍가는 날)		Park Jeong-hwan	Park Jeong-hwan
5.	"The Power of Middle Age" (중년의 힘)		Jo Yoon-jung	Jo Yoon-jung
6.	"Noun (Timing Game)" (눈치)		Ezee
7.	"Lovely Moments" (사랑의 꿈결)		Hong Dong-pyo	Hong Dong-pyo
8.	"What Are You Doing?" (뭘 하신다고요)		Lee Jong-han	Lee Jong-han
9.	"Drunken Tajo" (드렁큰 타조)		Jo Yoon-jung, Hong Dong-pyo	Jo Yoon-jung, Hong Dong-pyo
10.	"Dreamy Happy" (꿈결의 해피뮤직)		Joran	Joran
11.	"A Dignified Step" (위풍당당 행진)		Jeong Sa-bi	Jeong Sa-bi
12.	"I Do Love You" (Inst.)		Jo Yoon-jung

=== Part 3 ===
Released on July 27, 2021
No.	Title	Lyrics	Music	Artist	Length
1.	"Is This Love?" (이게 사랑인걸까)	Lim Kyung-soo	Jo Yoon-jung	Shin Da-jeong
2.	"The Secret Funds"		Jo Yoon-jung
3.	"You Really Do It"		Lee Jong-han
4.	"The Afternoon Deviation"		EZEE	EZEE
5.	"Voice Fishings"		Jo Yoon-jeong, Jeong Sa-bi	Jo Yoon-jeong, Jeong Sa-bi
6.	"Ssangdabong (Totes The Best)"		Ezee	Ezee
7.	"A Spy"		Ezee	Ezee
8.	"The Unbelievable Truth"		Jeong Sa-bi
9.	"Morning in the Garden"		Ezee	Ezee
10.	"Lie Note"		Park Jeong-hwan	Park Jeong-hwan
11.	"The Way to Happiness"		Kim Ji-ae	Kim Ji-ae
12.	"TV Na Boja-gyu (Watching TV)"		Jo Yoon-jung	Jo Yoon-jung

=== Part 4 ===
Released on August 18, 2021
No.	Title	Lyrics	Music	Artist	Length
1.	"I'm Falling for You"	Jo So-hee	Jo So-hee	Lee Kyu-hyung
2.	"A Special Gift" (선물)	Jo So-hee	Jo Yoon-jung	Jo Yoon-jung
3.	"Hogu Gene" (호구유전자)	Jo Yoon-jung	Jo Yoon-jung	Jo Yoon-jung
4.	"A Tragic Day" (웃픈 하루)		EZEE	EZEE
5.	"Pouring and Dipping" (부먹찍먹)	Jeong Sa-bi	Jeong Sa-bi	Jeong Sa-bi
6.	"A Black Rose" (배반의 장미)		Jo Yoon-jung	Jo Yoon-jung
7.	"I'll Do It" (내가 해요 I'll Do It)	Lee	Lee	Lee Jong-han
8.	"Your Salary" (월급)		Ezee	Ezee
9.	"Why Do You Do That?" (왜 그러는 고라니)		Hong Dong-pyo	Hong Dong-pyo
10.	"Okay B Light" (오케이 비광)		Ezee	Jo Yoon-jung

=== Part 5 ===
Released on August 27, 2021
No.	Title	Lyrics	Music	Artist	Length
1.	"An Uncertain Future"	Yoo Jae-ha	Yoo Jae-ha	Ok Jin-wook
2.	"Human Vitamin"	Yoo Jae-ha	Jo Yoon-jung	Jo Yoon-jung

== Viewership ==
Be My Dream Family : South Korea viewers per episode (millions)

Episodes	Episode number																			
Episodes	1	2	3	4	5	6	7	8	9	10	11	12	13	14	15	16	17	18	19	20
Ep.01-20	2.947	2.582	2.725	2.703	2.572	2.730	2.555	2.532	2.462	2.705	2.303	2.445	2.509	2.444	2.626	2.427	2.569	2.533	2.361	2.699
Ep.21-40	2.365	2.434	2.461	2.322	2.493	2.430	2.409	2.516	2.464	2.627	2.370	2.352	2.722	2.666	2.642	2.396	2.675	2.751	2.489	2.705
Ep.41-60	2.636	2.295	2.438	2.605	2.633	2.487	2.418	2.633	2.440	2.629	2.469	2.490	2.885	2.601	2.626	2.714	2.560	2.701	2.515	2.678
Ep.61-80	2.507	2.618	2.781	2.551	2.669	2.424	2.738	2.702	2.520	2.697	2.528	2.443	2.400	2.001	2.951	2.291	2.712	2.766	2.364	1.574
Ep.81-100	1.631	2.624	2.616	2.527	2.758	2.426	2.735	2.656	2.582	2.737	2.650	2.744	2.514	2.799	2.548	2.722	2.554	2.692	2.515	2.473
Ep.101-120	2.672	2.430	2.338	2.645	2.599	2.557	2.403	2.553	2.799	2.419	1.683	1.639	2.574	2.828	2.659	2.709	2.550	2.715	2.679	2.634

Source: Audience measurement performed nationwide by Nielsen Korea.

Ep.	Original broadcast date	Average audience share		
Ep.	Original broadcast date	Nielsen Korea		TNmS
Ep.	Original broadcast date	Nationwide	Seoul	Nationwide
1	March 29, 2021	18.4% (1st)	16.7% (1st)	18.5% (2nd)
2	March 30, 2021	16.0% (2nd)	14.6% (1st)	16.8% (2nd)
3	March 31, 2021	17.5% (1st)	15.9% (1st)	16.6% (2nd)
4	April 1, 2021	17.3% (1st)	15.6% (1st)	18.5% (2nd)
5	April 2, 2021	16.3% (4th)	14.9% (4th)	16.2% (5th)
6	April 5, 2021	17.8% (1st)	15.6% (1st)	18.0% (2nd)
7	April 6, 2021	16.1% (2nd)	14.0% (1st)	16.3% (2nd)
8	April 8, 2021 (Note: The episode on April 7, 2021 was not aired due to broadcast of re-election program Choice to Change My Life.)	16.1% (2nd)	14.5% (1st)	16.0% (2nd)
9	April 9, 2021	15.4% (1st)	13.4% (1st)	15.2% (2nd)
10	April 12, 2021	17.1% (2nd)	14.8% (1st)	17.8% (2nd)
11	April 13, 2021	15.1% (2nd)	13.9% (1st)	15.9% (2nd)
12	April 14, 2021	15.6% (2nd)	14.0% (1st)	15.3% (2nd)
13	April 15, 2021	15.9% (1st)	14.1% (1st)	16.5% (2nd)
14	April 16, 2021	15.6% (2nd)	14.0% (3rd)	14.7% (2nd)
15	April 19, 2021	17.1% (1st)	15.8% (1st)	16.6% (2nd)
16	April 20, 2021	15.7% (2nd)	13.6% (2nd)	15.1% (2nd)
17	April 21, 2021	15.9% (1st)	14.5% (1st)	15.1% (2nd)
18	April 22, 2021	16.1% (1st)	14.6% (1st)	15.4% (2nd)
19	April 23, 2021	15.5% (2nd)	14.3% (2nd)	15.1% (2nd)
20	April 26, 2021	16.3% (1st)	14.9% (1st)	17.3% (2nd)
21	April 27, 2021	15.5% (2nd)	14.3% (1st)	14.9% (2nd)
22	April 28, 2021	15.1% (2nd)	13.2% (2nd)	14.1% (2nd)
23	April 29, 2021	16.2% (2nd)	15.1% (1st)	14.7% (2nd)
24	April 30, 2021	14.8% (3rd)	13.7% (3rd)	14.6% (2nd)
25	May 3, 2021	16.5% (1st)	14.9% (1st)	16.7% (2nd)
26	May 4, 2021	15.2% (2nd)	13.5% (2nd)	15.0% (2nd)
27	May 5, 2021	14.5% (2nd)	12.5% (2nd)	14.7% (2nd)
28	May 6, 2021	16.0% (1st)	14.8% (1st)	15.7% (2nd)
29	May 7, 2021	15.2% (2nd)	14.9% (2nd)	14.0% (3rd)
30	May 10, 2021	16.3% (2nd)	14.8% (2nd)	15.2% (2nd)
31	May 11, 2021	14.8% (2nd)	13.6% (1st)	14.2% (2nd)
32	May 12, 2021	14.5% (2nd)	13.1% (2nd)	14.7% (2nd)
33	May 13, 2021	17.2% (1st)	15.7% (1st)	15.5% (2nd)
34	May 14, 2021	16.4% (1st)	14.8% (2nd)	14.9% (2nd)
35	May 17, 2021	17.1% (1st)	15.6% (1st)	16.1% (2nd)
36	May 18, 2021	16.0% (2nd)	14.9% (1st)	14.5% (2nd)
37	May 19, 2021	16.6% (2nd))	15.3% (1st)	15.2% (2nd)
38	May 20, 2021	17.3% (2nd)	15.3% (1st)	17.1% (2nd)
39	May 21, 2021	15.6% (1st)	13.6% (2nd)	15.7% (2nd)
40	May 24, 2021	17.0% (1st)	15.7% (1st)	16.4% (2nd)
41	May 25, 2021	16.4% (1st)	14.8% (1st)	15.7% (2nd)
42	May 26, 2021	15.3% (2nd)	14.1% (2nd)	15.2% (2nd)
43	May 27, 2021	15.2% (1st)	14.2% (1st)	15.3% (1st)
44	May 28, 2021	15.9% (1st)	14.7% (2nd)	14.6% (2nd)
45	May 31, 2021	16.3% (1st)	14.4% (1st)	15.9% (2nd)
46	June 1, 2021	15.9% (2nd)	13.8% (2nd)	14.9% (2nd)
47	June 2, 2021	15.7% (2nd)	14.4% (2nd)	14.0% (2nd)
48	June 3, 2021	17.3% (1st)	15.5% (1st)	15.8% (2nd)
49	June 4, 2021	15.6% (4th)	14.4% (4th)	14.6% (5th)
50	June 7, 2021	16.4% (1st)	14.6% (1st)	15.8% (2nd)
51	June 8, 2021	15.6% (1st)	14.0% (1st)	15.0% (2nd)
52	June 9, 2021	15.7% (1st)	14.0% (1st)	14.1% (2nd)
53	June 10, 2021	18.2% (1st)	16.1% (1st)	15.9% (2nd)
54	June 11, 2021	16.0% (3rd)	13.5% (4th)	15.9% (2nd)
55	June 14, 2021	17.1% (1st)	15.4% (1st)	15.5% (2nd)
56	June 15, 2021	17.2% (1st)	15.6% (1st)	14.2% (2nd)
57	June 16, 2021	16.0% (1st)	13.7% (1st)	14.9% (2nd)
58	June 17, 2021	17.4% (1st)	15.2% (1st)	16.2% (2nd)
59	June 18, 2021	16.2% (3rd)	14.7% (4th)	14.8% (3rd)
60	June 21, 2021	17.2% (1st)	15.3% (1st)	15.4% (2nd)
61	June 22, 2021	15.8% (2nd)	13.7% (2nd)	14.9% (2nd)
62	June 23, 2021	16.9% (1st)	15.1% (1st)	14.8% (2nd)
63	June 24, 2021	17.8% (1st)	15.8% (1st)	15.5% (2nd)
64	June 25, 2021	15.8% (4th)	14.2% (4th)	14.2% (4th)
65	June 28, 2021	16.8% (1st)	14.7% (1st)	15.3% (2nd)
66	June 29, 2021	15.9% (2nd)	14.2% (2nd)	14.0% (2nd)
67	June 30, 2021	16.5% (1st)	15.3% (1st)	15.0% (2nd)
68	July 1, 2021	16.1% (2nd)	14.0% (1st)	15.1% (2nd)
69	July 2, 2021	15.5% (3rd)	13.8% (2nd)	13.8% (3rd)
70	July 5, 2021	17.3% (1st)	15.5% (1st)	15.8% (1st)
71	July 6, 2021	16.1% (1st)	14.3% (1st)	14.7% (1st)
72	July 7, 2021	15.4% (1st)	13.7% (1st)	15.4% (1st)
73	July 8, 2021	15.9% (1st)	15.4% (1st)	14.2% (1st)
74	July 9, 2021	11.9% (2nd)	10.6% (2nd)	14.3% (2nd)
75	July 12, 2021	18.0% (1st)	16.6% (1st)	16.8% (1st)
76	July 13, 2021	14.3% (1st)	13.4% (1st)	13.1% (1st)
77	July 14, 2021	16.5% (1st)	16.0% (1st)	15.3% (1st)
78	July 15, 2021	17.0% (1st)	15.2% (1st)	16.6% (1st)
79	July 16, 2021	15.2% (2nd)	13.8% (2nd)	15.0% (2nd)
80	August 5, 2021 (Note: Episodes from July 19 to August 4, 2021 not aired due to both the COVID-19 pandemic and 2020 Summer Olympics broadcast.)	10.2% (1st)	9.3% (1st)	9.1% (2nd)
81	August 6, 2021	10.0% (3rd)	9.4% (3rd)	9.7% (4th)
82	August 9, 2021	16.2% (1st)	14.9% (1st)	—N/a
83	August 10, 2021	16.0% (1st)	14.7% (1st)	—N/a
84	August 11, 2021	15.7% (1st)	14.5% (1st)	—N/a
85	August 12, 2021	16.8% (1st)	15.4% (1st)	—N/a
86	August 13, 2021	15.4% (2nd)	14.8% (2nd)	14.3% (3rd)
87	August 16, 2021	17.1% (1st)	16.0% (1st)	15.3% (2nd)
88	August 17, 2021	16.3% (1st)	15.2% (1st)	14.9% (2nd)
89	August 18, 2021	16.0% (1st)	15.0% (1st)	14.4% (2nd)
90	August 19, 2021	16.8% (1st)	15.4% (1st)	16.0% (2nd)
91	August 20, 2021	16.3% (2nd)	15.0% (2nd)	14.7% (3rd)
92	August 23, 2021	17.6% (1st)	16.5% (1st)	16.8% (2nd)
93	August 25, 2021 (Note: This episode did not air on August 24, 2021, due to coverage of the 2020 Summer Paralympics opening ceremony.)	16.2% (2nd)	14.7% (1st)	14.3% (2nd)
94	August 26, 2021	17.2% (1st)	16.3% (1st)	15.7% (2nd)
95	August 27, 2021	16.8% (2nd)	15.6% (2nd)	14.6% (3rd)
96	August 30, 2021	17.5% (1st)	16.5% (1st)	16.1% (2nd)
97	August 31, 2021	17.0% (1st)	15.2% (1st)	14.4% (2nd)
98	September 1, 2021	17.5% (1st)	16.1% (1st)	14.9% (2nd)
99	September 2, 2021	16.2% (1st)	14.5% (1st)	14.8% (2nd)
100	September 3, 2021	15.5% (3rd)	14.2% (2nd)	13.6% (3rd)
101	September 6, 2021	17.5% (1st)	15.9% (1st)	14.7% (2nd)
102	September 7, 2021	15.5% (1st)	13.8% (2nd)	13.4% (2nd)
103	September 8, 2021	15.2% (2nd)	14.4% (2nd)	15.4% (2nd)
104	September 9, 2021	16.4% (1st)	14.7% (1st)	15.2% (2nd)
105	September 10, 2021	15.8% (2nd)	14.1% (2nd)	
106	September 13, 2021	16.4% (2nd)	14.4% (1st)	15.2% (2nd)
107	September 14, 2021	15.2% (2nd)	13.9% (2nd)	13.9% (2nd)
108	September 15, 2021	16.0% (2nd)	14.8% (1st)	14.4% (2nd)
109	September 16, 2021	17.2% (1st)	15.6% (1st)	15.3% (2nd)
110	September 17, 2021	15.7% (2nd)	14.7% (1st)	14.8% (2nd)
111	September 20, 2021	9.7% (3rd)	9.2% (3rd)	—N/a
112	September 21, 2021	9.3% (2nd)	9.0% (1st)	—N/a
113	September 22, 2021	16.0% (1st)	14.1% (1st)	14.4% (2nd)
114	September 23, 2021	17.8% (1st)	16.1% (1st)	15.1% (2nd)
115	September 24, 2021	17.1% (1st)	16.1% (1st)	14.4% (2nd)
116	September 27, 2021	17.5% (1st)	16.0% (1st)	14.7% (2nd)
117	September 28, 2021	16.6% (2nd)	14.7% (2nd)	14.7% (2nd)
118	September 29, 2021	16.8% (2nd)	15.1% (2nd)	15.1% (2nd)
119	September 30, 2021	16.6% (1st)	14.8% (1st)	15.0% (2nd)
120	October 1, 2021	16.7% (1st)	15.5% (1st)	15.9% (2nd)
Average		16.0%	14.5%	—
In this table, the blue numbers represent the lowest ratings and the red numbers represent the highest ratings.; N/A denotes that the rating is not known.

== Awards and nominations ==
Year	Award	Category	Recipient	Result	Ref.
2021	KBS Drama Awards	Excellence Award, Actor in a Daily Drama	Ryu Jin	Won	
2021	KBS Drama Awards	Excellence Award, Actor in a Daily Drama	Choi Jung-woo	Nominated	
2021	KBS Drama Awards	Best Supporting Actress	Hahm Eun-jung	Won	
2021	KBS Drama Awards	Excellence Award, Actress in a Daily Drama	Park Joon-geum	Nominated	
2021	KBS Drama Awards	Excellence Award, Actress in a Daily Drama	Park Tam-hee	Nominated	
2021	KBS Drama Awards	Popularity Award - Female	Yoon Hae-young	Nominated	
2021	KBS Drama Awards	Popularity Award - Male	Ryu Jin	Nominated	
2021	KBS Drama Awards	Best Young Actress	Lee Go-eun	Nominated	
