= D-Day (TV series) =

- Promotional poster
- Genre: Disaster; Medical drama Romance
- Created by: JTBC
- Written by: Hwang Eun-kyung
- Directed by: Jang Yong-woo
- Starring: Kim Young-kwang; Jung So-min; Ha Seok-jin
- Country of origin: South Korea
- Original language: Korean
- No. of episodes: 20

Production
- Executive producer: Jo Jun Hyoung
- Producers: Yoon Jae won Ahn Chang hyun Han Hye yeon Jeong Chang-Hwan; Han Se-min
- Running time: 75 minutes
- Production company: S.M. Culture & Contents

Original release
- Network: JTBC
- Release: September 18 – November 21, 2015

D-Day (Korean: 디데이; RR: Didei) is a 2015 South Korean television series that aired on JTBC on Fridays and Saturdays at 20:40 (KST) for 20 episodes beginning September 18, 2015.

== Synopsis ==
Lee Hae-seong (Kim Young-kwang) is a surgeon who is transferred from one of the best hospitals in Seoul to a rundown hospital with no ER. After disobeying his previous hospital director, Park Gun (Lee Geung-young), he then meets Jung Ddol-mi (Jung So-min), an orthopedic resident from Busan who came to Seoul to transfer a patient. Ddol-mi tries to meet professor Han Woo-jin (Ha Seok-jin), a cold robotics surgeon who works in Hae-seong's old hospital who saved her life when she was younger before going back to Busan. However, she is stuck in Seoul after trying to save a patient. Meanwhile, a sinkhole appears in Seoul followed by a big earthquake that blocks all access to the city, causing phones, electricity, and water to not function. Hae-seong teams up with Ddol-mi to treat people, but soon medicine starts to run out.

== Cast ==
=== Main ===
- Kim Young-kwang as Lee Hae-seong
- Jung So-min as Jung Ddol-mi
- Ha Seok-jin as Han Woo-jin

=== Supporting ===
- Kim Ki-moo as Cha Ki-woong
- Kim Jung-hwa as Eun So-yool
- Kim Sang-ho as Choi Il-sub
- Kim Hye-eun as Kang Joo-ran
- Song Ji-ho as Lee Woo-sung
- Yoon Joo-hee as Park Ji-na
- Lee Geung-young as Park Gun
- Lee Kyung-jin as Park Yoon-sook
- Yoo Se-hyung as Yoo-se
- Shin Cheol-jin as Lee Hae Sung's patient
- Cha In-pyo as Koo Ja-hyuk
- Lee Sung-yeol as Ahn Dae-gil
- Ko Kyu-pil as Yoo Myung-hyun
- Choi Seung-hoon as Seong Dong-ha
- Jung Yoon-sun
- Han Seo-jin

== Ratings ==
In this table, the blue numbers represent the lowest ratings and the red numbers represent the highest ratings.

Ep.	Original broadcast date	Average audience share	
Ep.	Original broadcast date	AGB Nielsen	TNmS
Ep.	Original broadcast date	Nationwide	Nationwide
1	September 18, 2015	1.741%	1.9%
2	September 19, 2015	1.272%	1.8%
3	September 25, 2015	1.909%	1.8%
4	September 26, 2015	1.563%	1.8%
5	October 2, 2015	1.283%	1.3%
6	October 3, 2015	1.473%	1.0%
7	October 9, 2015	1.106%	1.6%
8	October 10, 2015	0.993%	1.2%
9	October 16, 2015	1.155%	1.4%
10	October 17, 2015	0.895%	1.0%
11	October 23, 2015	1.267%	1.4%
12	October 24, 2015	1.092%	1.3%
13	October 30, 2015	0.961%	1.2%
14	October 31, 2015	1.347%	1.6%
15	November 6, 2015	0.943%	1.2%
16	November 7, 2015	1.066%	1.0%
17	November 13, 2015	0.928%	1.3%
18	November 14, 2015	0.718%	0.8%
19	November 20, 2015	0.879%	0.9%
20	November 21, 2015	0.817%	0.8%
Average		1.170%	1.3%

- This drama airs on a cable channel/pay TV which normally has a relatively smaller audience compared to free-to-air TV/public broadcasters (KBS, SBS, MBC and EBS).
