= Soul Mechanic =

2020 South Korean television series

- Promotional poster
- Also known as: Fix You
- Hangul: 영혼수선공
- Hanja: 靈魂修繕工
- Lit.: Soul Repairer
- RR: Yeonghon suseongong
- MR: Yŏnghon susŏn'gong
- Genre: Medical
- Created by: Ki Min-soo; Kim Sang-hwi (KBS Drama Headquarters)
- Written by: Lee Hyang-hee
- Directed by: Yoo Hyun-ki
- Starring: Shin Ha-kyun; Jung So-min; Tae In-ho; Park Ye-jin
- Music by: Park Sung-jin; Choi Min-chang
- Country of origin: South Korea
- Original language: Korean
- No. of episodes: 32 (Note: In order to circumvent Korean laws that prevent commercial breaks in the middle of an episode, what would previously have been aired as single 70 minute episodes are now being repackaged as two 35 minute episodes, with two episodes being shown each night with a commercial break between the two.)

Production
- Executive producer: Kang Byung-taek (KBS)
- Producer: Jung Hye-ryong
- Camera setup: Single-camera
- Running time: 35 minutes
- Production companies: Monster Union; Imagine Asia

Original release
- Network: KBS2
- Release: May 6 – June 25, 2020

Soul Mechanic (Korean: 영혼수선공) is a 2020 South Korean television series starring Shin Ha-kyun, Jung So-min, Tae In-ho and Park Ye-jin. It aired on KBS2 from May 6 to June 25, 2020.

== Synopsis ==
A team of psychiatrists who believe in healing, and not just treating sick patients. Lee Shi-joon (Shin Ha-kyun) is happy to deal with living in a crazy world by being his eccentric self and leaning on humor to reach out to patients. He ends up being assigned a problem patient, Han Woo-joo (Jung So-min), a musical rising star with terrible anger management issues.

== Cast ==
=== Main ===
- Shin Ha-kyun as Lee Shi-joon
- Jung So-min as Han Woo-joo
- Tae In-ho as In Dong-hyuk
- Park Ye-jin as Ji Young-won

=== Supporting ===
- Joo Min-kyung as Gong Ji-sun
- Jo Kyung-sook as Jo In-hye
- Park Soo-young as Oh Ki-tae
- Jung Hae-kyun as Park Dae-ha
- Choi Jung-woo as Lee Taek-kyung
- Park Hyun-suk as Oh Hwa-young
- Ahn Dong-goo as No Woo-jung
- Park Han-sol as Gong Ji-hee
- Kim Kang-min as Kim Young-seok
- Ha Young as Kang Neu-ri
- Baek Soo-hee as Kim Yoo-ra
- Jang Yoo-sang as Im Se-chan
- Oh Yoon-hong as Doctor
- Kang Shin-il as Gu Won-sook
- Kim Ga-ran as Jang Yoo-mi
- Ji Joo-yeon as Jung Se-yeon
- Kim Hyun as Patient
- Park Sang-hoon as Park Luo (Patient)

=== Special appearances ===
- Wi Ha-joon
- Lee Sung-min
- Kim Dong-young as Cha Dong-il
- Ban Hyo-jung
- Kim Hye-eun
- Ryu Si-won

== Original soundtrack ==
Soul Mechanic OST

Soundtrack album by Various Artists
- Released: 2020
- Genre: Soundtrack
- Languages: Korean; English
- Label: Dreamus Company

=== Part 1 ===
Released on May 7, 2020
No.	Title	Lyrics	Music	Artist	Length
1.	"I'm Fine"	Shim Hyun-bo	Park Sung-jin; Choi Min-chang	Oh Ha-young (Apink)	3:58
2.	"I'm Fine" (Inst.)		Park Sung-jin; Choi Min-chang		3:58
Total length:					7:56

=== Part 2 ===
Released on May 21, 2020
No.	Title	Lyrics	Music	Artist	Length
1.	"Lean on Me" (우리 둘, 서로의 위로가 되어)	Shim Hyun-bo	Shim Hyun-bo; Park Min-seo	Ha Hyun-sang	3:56
2.	"Lean on Me" (Inst.)		Shim Hyun-bo; Park Min-seo		3:56
Total length:					7:52

=== Part 3 ===
Released on May 28, 2020
No.	Title	Lyrics	Music	Artist	Length
1.	"Confuse" (마음이 이상해)	Shim Hyun-bo	Shim Hyun-bo; Park Min-seo	Suran	4:24
2.	"Confuse" (Inst.)		Shim Hyun-bo; Park Min-seo		4:24
Total length:					8:48

=== Part 4 ===
Released on June 3, 2020
No.	Title	Lyrics	Music	Artist	Length
1.	"When Tomorrow Comes" (내일이 오면)	Red Socks	Red Socks; Kang Hyun-deuk	NIA	3:46
2.	"When Tomorrow Comes" (Inst.)		Red Socks; Kang Hyun-deuk		3:46
Total length:					7:32

=== Part 5 ===
Released on June 4, 2020
No.	Title	Lyrics	Music	Artist	Length
1.	"Love After Love" (하루가)	Kim Soo-jung	atomik	Tim	4:34
2.	"Love After Love" (Inst.)		atomik		4:34
Total length:					9:08

=== Part 6 ===
Released on June 11, 2020
No.	Title	Lyrics	Music	Artist	Length
1.	"Sigh" (휴(休))	BIG Naughty	BIG Naughty; Giriboy; Choi Min-chang	Shin Ha-kyun; BIG Naughty	3:57
2.	"Sigh" (Inst.)		BIG Naughty; Giriboy; Choi Min-chang		3:57
Total length:					7:54

== Ratings ==
In this table, the blue numbers represent the lowest ratings and the red numbers represent the highest ratings.

Ep.	Original broadcast date	Average audience share
Ep.	Original broadcast date	Nielsen Korea
Ep.	Original broadcast date	Nationwide
1	May 6, 2020	4.7%
2	May 6, 2020	5.2%
3	May 7, 2020	3.1%
4	May 7, 2020	4.4%
5	May 13, 2020	3.7%
6	May 13, 2020	3.8%
7	May 14, 2020	2.2%
8	May 14, 2020	3.0%
9	May 20, 2020	2.3%
10	May 20, 2020	2.6%
11	May 21, 2020	2.2%
12	May 21, 2020	3.3%
13	May 27, 2020	2.0%
14	May 27, 2020	2.7%
15	May 28, 2020	1.8%
16	May 28, 2020	2.5%
17	June 3, 2020	2.1%
18	June 3, 2020	2.2%
19	June 4, 2020	2.3%
20	June 4, 2020	2.7%
21	June 10, 2020	1.9%
22	June 10, 2020	2.1%
23	June 11, 2020	1.4%
24	June 11, 2020	1.7%
25	June 17, 2020	1.5%
26	June 17, 2020	1.9%
27	June 18, 2020	1.7%
28	June 18, 2020	2.1%
29	June 24, 2020	2.0%
30	June 24, 2020	2.5%
31	June 25, 2020	2.1%
32	June 25, 2020	2.3%
Average		2.6%
