= Jung So-min =

South Korean actress (born 1989)

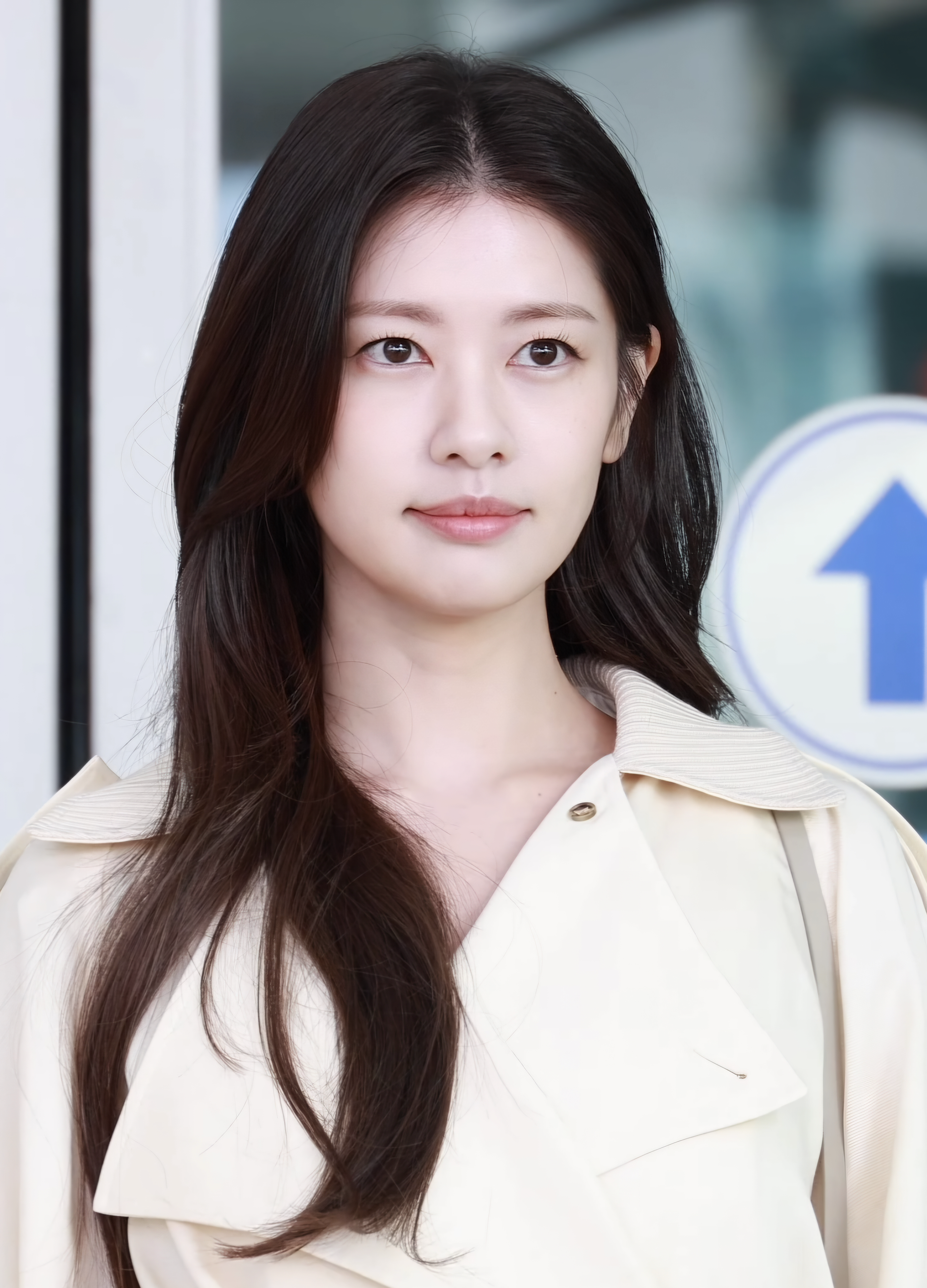
- Jung in March 2025
- Born: March 16, 1989 (age 37); Seoul, South Korea
- Education: Korea National University of Arts
- Occupation: Actress
- Years active: 2010–present
- Agent: Hiin Entertainment

Korean name
- Hangul: 김윤지
- RR: Gim Yunji
- MR: Kim Yunji

Stage name
- Hangul: 정소민
- RR: Jeong Somin
- MR: Chŏng Somin

Signature
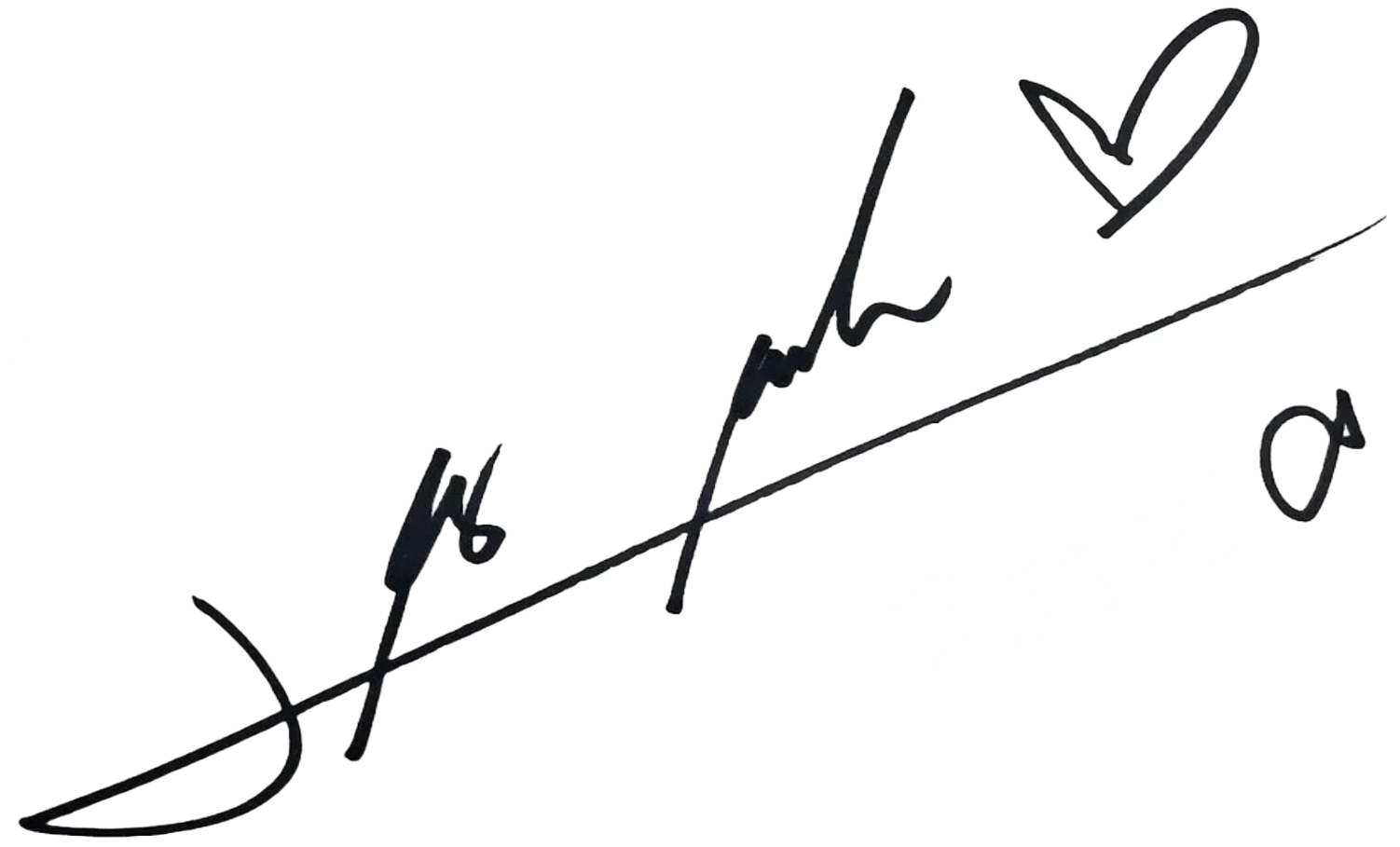

Kim Yoon-ji (Korean: 김윤지; born March 16, 1989), known professionally as Jung So-min (정소민), is a South Korean actress. Jung made her screen debut in 2010 with a supporting role in the television series Bad Guy. She then got her first leading role that same year in the romantic comedy television series Playful Kiss. She is known for her leading roles in the television series Because This Is My First Life (2017), Alchemy of Souls (2022), Love Next Door (2024), and Would You Marry Me? (2025), as well as the film Love Reset (2023).

== Career ==
=== 2010–2015: Beginnings ===
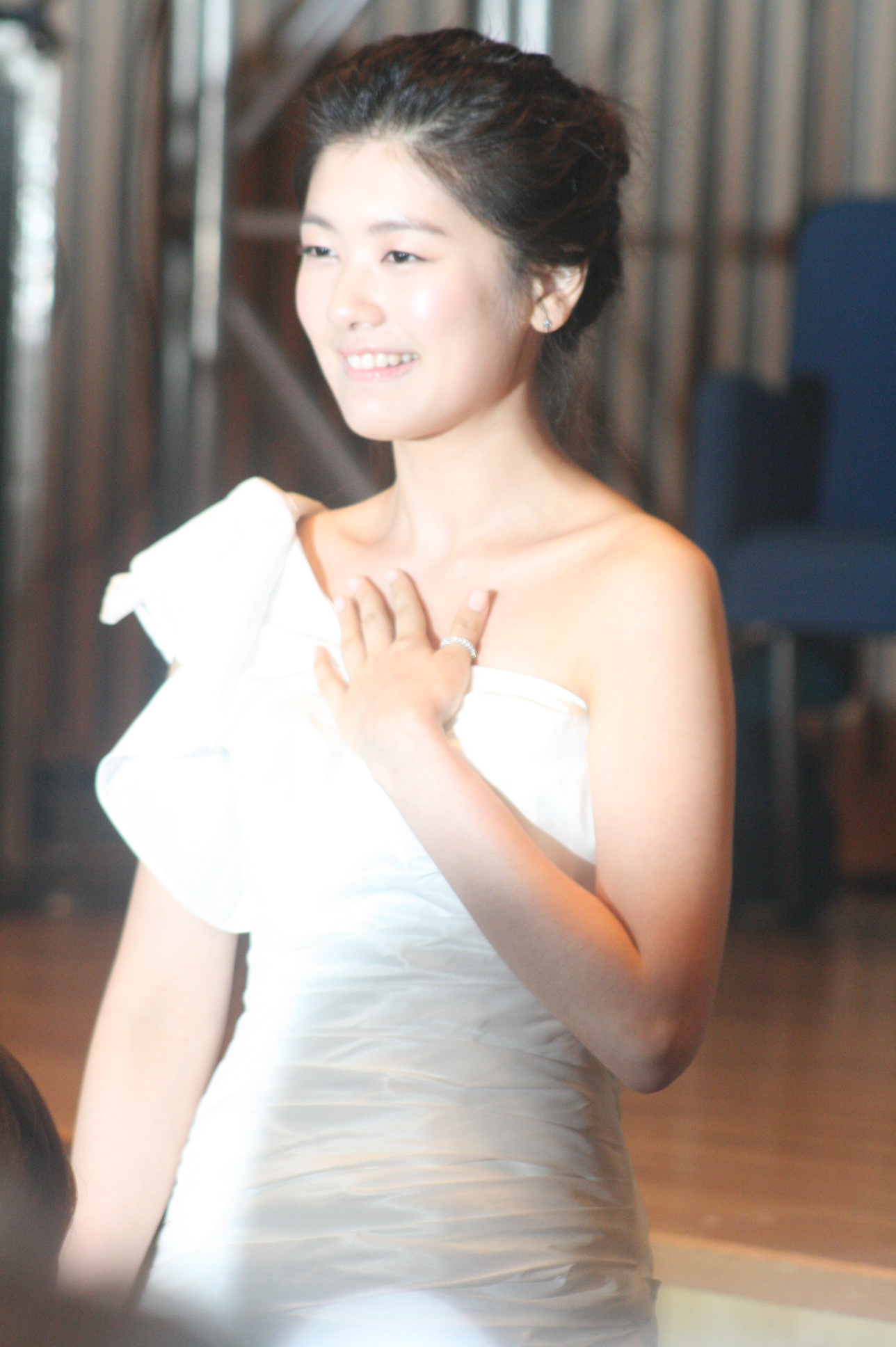
Jung in May 2010

Jung first attracted attention when she made her acting debut in 2010 with a supporting role in the television series Bad Guy. This led to a leading role in her next project Playful Kiss, the Korean adaptation of the popular manga Itazura na Kiss. Though it received low ratings in Korea, the romantic comedy was popular overseas, further raising Jung's profile.

Jung then took a short break in 2011 to concentrate on her studies at the Korea National University of Arts. In 2012, she returned to the small screen as part of the ensemble cast of the sitcom Standby. Later that year, she played a more mature role opposite Sung Joon in the cable series Can We Get Married?.

Jung left her talent agency Bloom Entertainment in 2013 and joined SM Culture & Contents. She then appeared in Came to Me and Became a Star, a single-episode anthology Drama Special.

In 2014, Jung played a self-centered heiress who falls for the protagonist (played by Kang Ji-hwan) in Big Man. This was followed in 2015 by a supporting role in coming-of-age film Twenty, and leading roles in horror-romance film Alice: Boy from Wonderland and disaster-medical drama D-Day.

=== 2016–present: Leading roles in film and television ===
Jung starred in a Drama Special The Red Teacher in 2016. She was then cast as the female lead in The Sound of Your Heart opposite Lee Kwang-soo in December of the same year. The web drama was a success in China and gained more than 100 million views on Sohu.

In 2017, Jung was cast in KBS weekend family drama My Father is Strange. She also starred in the body-swap comedy Daddy You, Daughter Me opposite veteran actor Yoon Je-moon. She then left SM Culture & Contents in June and signed with new management agency Jellyfish Entertainment. In August, she confirmed her appearance in tvN's romantic comedy series Because This Is My First Life alongside Lee Min-ki. She also released an OST "Because You Are Beside Me" for the drama.

Jung was chosen to play the lead role in The Smile Has Left Your Eyes in 2018. This is an adaptation of the 2002 Japanese television series Sora Kara Furu Ichioku no Hoshi where she also recorded an OST "Star" with her co-star, Seo In-guk. The same year, she was cast in the historical comedy flick Homme Fatale. She wrapped up 2018 with her first radio show Jung So Min's Young Street on SBS Power FM, thus achieving her dream to become a radio DJ someday.

Jung left Jellyfish Entertainment in August 2019 and signed with another management company Blossom Entertainment. She then became a cast member in a healing variety program Little Forest, which is designed as a home kids garden development project for children. In December, she stepped down from her DJ post in Jung So Min's Young Street.

In 2020, Jung starred in the medical drama Soul Mechanic alongside Shin Ha-kyun where she portrayed a musical rising star with terrible anger management issues.

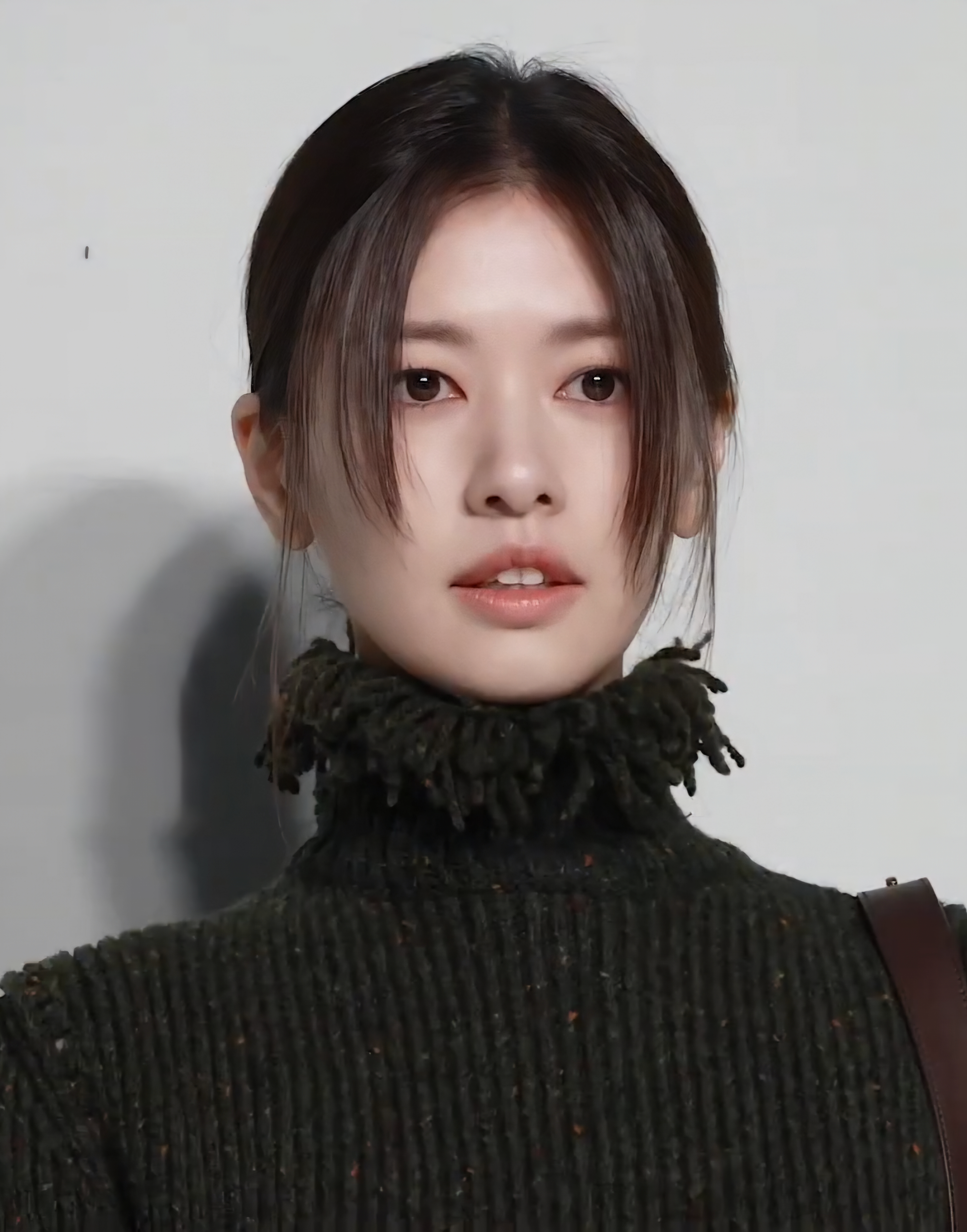
Jung in September 2024

In 2021, she did a cameo in Park Joon-hwa's fantasy romantic comedy My Roommate Is a Gumiho, appearing as the woman whom protagonist Jang Ki-yong loved in the past. She also appeared in TV romance drama Monthly Magazine Home opposite Kim Ji-seok as an editor of a lifestyle magazine Monthly House.

In 2022, Jung returned to the small screen with the tvN period fantasy drama Alchemy of Souls where she played a skilled assassin whose soul is trapped inside the body of servant girl, alongside Lee Jae-wook. However, she only made a cameo in the season 2. In August, Jung signed with TH Company. In September, Jung returned to the big screen for the first time in three years with the sci-fi film Project Wolf Hunting.

In 2023, Jung signed with Ieum Hashtag. In October of the same year, Jung starred in the South Korean romantic comedy film, Love Reset, directed by Nam Dae-jung, co-starring Kang Ha-neul where she played a film producer who suffering from amnesia due to an unexpected accident.

Jung accepted the offer to star alongside Jung Hae-in in 2024 tvN romantic comedy drama, Love Next Door helmed by director Yoo Je-won and writer Shin Ha-eun of Hometown Cha-Cha-Cha where she played a woman who is successful in life but suddenly breaks down one day and returns to her hometown to reboot her life. The drama dominated the ratings for a number of weeks. In 2025, she starred in SBS TV's romantic comedy Would You Marry Me?.

In December 2025, Jung signed with Hiin Entertainment.

== Filmography ==
=== Film ===
Year	Title	Role	Notes	Ref.
2009	Worst Friends	Mang	Short film	
2015	Twenty	So-min		
2015	Alice: Boy from Wonderland	Hye-jung		
2017	Daddy You, Daughter Me	Won Do-yeon		
2018	Golden Slumber	Yoo-mi	Cameo	
2019	Homme Fatale	Hae-won		
2022	Project Wolf Hunting	Lee Da-yeon		
2023	Love Reset	Hong Na-ra		

=== Television series ===
Year	Title	Role	Notes	Ref.
2010	Bad Guy	Hong Mo-ne		
2010	Playful Kiss	Oh Ha-ni		
2012	Standby	Jung So-min		
2012	Can We Get Married?	Jung Hye-yoon		
2013	Came to Me and Became a Star	Ha-jin	Drama special	
2014	Miss Korea	Gas station attendant	Cameo (Ep. 20)	
2014	Big Man	Kang Jin-ah		
2015	D-Day	Jung Ddol-mi		
2016	The Red Teacher	Jang Soon-deok	Drama special	
2016	The Sound of Your Heart	Choi Sang-bong/Ae-bong		
2017	My Father Is Strange	Byun Mi-young		
2017	Because This Is My First Life	Yoon Ji-ho		
2018	What's Wrong with Secretary Kim	Mi-so's mother (young)	Cameo (Ep. 10)	
2018	The Smile Has Left Your Eyes	Yoo Jin-kang		
2019	Abyss	Female Alien "Grim Reaper"	Cameo (Ep. 1)	
2019	Be Melodramatic	Seon-joo	Cameo (Ep. 16)	
2020	Soul Mechanic	Han Woo-joo		
2021	My Roommate Is a Gumiho	Seo-hwa	Cameo (Ep. 5–7)	
2021	Monthly Magazine Home	Na Young-won		
2022	Alchemy of Souls	Mu-deok / Jin Bu-yeon / Naksu	Part 1	
2024	Love Next Door	Bae Seok-ryu		
2025	Would You Marry Me?	Yoo Me-ri		
2027	The Dealer	Jung Gun-hwa		

=== Television shows ===
Year	Title	Role	Ref.
2019	Little Forest	Cast member	

=== Radio shows ===
Year	Title	Role	Ref.
2019	Jung So-min's Young Street	DJ	

== Theater ==
Theater play performances
Year	Title	Role	Venue	Date	Ref.
2023	Shakespeare in Love (셰익스피어 인 러브 - 서울)	Viola de Lesseps	Seoul Arts Center CJ Towol Theater	January 28 to March 26	
2023	Shakespeare in Love (셰익스피어 인 러브 - 서울)	Viola de Lesseps	Sejong Arts Centre	April 8 to 9	

== Discography ==
=== Soundtrack appearances ===
Year	Song title	Album	Notes/Ref.
2017	"Because You're Here"	Because This Is My First Life OST	
2018	"Star"	The Smile Has Left Your Eyes OST	with Seo In-guk

== Audiobooks ==
Author	Title	Publication date	Publisher	Language	Notes
Miral Welfare Foundation	The Story Only I Didn't Know 3	May 23, 2022	Miral Welfare Foundation	Korean language	Recorded with Shin Beom-sik, Jo Su-yeon

== Awards and nominations ==
Name of the award ceremony, year presented, category, nominee of the award, and the result of the nomination
Award ceremony	Year	Category	Nominee / Work	Result	Ref.
Asia Artist Awards	2022	Popularity Award – Actor	Jung So-min	Nominated	
Asia Model Awards	2011	New Star Award	Jung So-min	Won	
Golden Cinematography Awards	2024	Best Actress	Love Reset	Won	
KBS Drama Awards	2016	Best Actress in a One-Act/Special/Short Drama	KBS Drama Special – Red Teacher	Nominated	
KBS Drama Awards	2017	Excellence Award, Actress in a Serial Drama	My Father is Strange	Nominated	
KBS Drama Awards	2017	Netizen Award, Actress	My Father is Strange	Nominated	
KBS Drama Awards	2020	Excellence Award, Actress in a Miniseries	Soul Mechanic	Nominated	
KBS Entertainment Awards	2016	Best Couple Award	Jung So-min (with Lee Kwang-soo); The Sound of Your Heart	Won	
Korea Jewelry Awards	2010	Topaz Award	Jung So-min	Won	
Korean Drama Awards	2022	Top Excellence Award, Actress	Alchemy of Souls	Nominated	
Korean Culture and Entertainment Awards	2010	Best New Actress for TV	Playful Kiss	Won	
MBC Drama Awards	2010	Best New Actress	Playful Kiss	Nominated	
MBC Entertainment Awards	2012	Best Newcomer in a Comedy / Sitcom	Standby	Won	
SBS Drama Awards	2010	Best Supporting Actress in a Drama Special	Bad Guy	Nominated	
SBS Drama Awards	2025	Top Excellence Award, Actress in a Romance/Comedy Drama	Would You Marry Me?	Won	
SBS Drama Awards	2025	Best Couple Award	Jung So-min (with Choi Woo-shik); Would You Marry Me?	Nominated	
The Seoul Awards	2017	Best Supporting Actress – Drama	My Father is Strange	Nominated	
