= Standby (TV series) =

2012 South Korean sitcom

- Promotional poster
- Genre: Sitcom
- Written by: Ki Seung-tae; Kim Yoon-hee; Lee Eun-young; Park Jae-hyun; Park Min-jung; Yang Seo-yoon
- Directed by: Jeon Jin-soo
- Starring: Ryu Jin; Lee Ki-woo; Ha Seok-jin; Claudia Kim; Jung So-min; Im Si-wan
- Country of origin: South Korea
- Original language: Korean
- No. of episodes: 113

Production
- Production company: Chorokbaem Media

Original release
- Network: Munhwa Broadcasting Corporation
- Release: April 9 – October 5, 2012

Standby (Korean: 스탠바이) is a 2012 South Korean sitcom that aired on MBC from April 9 to October 5, 2012 on Mondays to Fridays at 19:45. It is about the everyday stories of producers, writers and announcers working at TV11, a fictional broadcasting company.

== Cast ==
=== Main characters ===
- Ryu Jin as Ryu Jin-haeng - timid announcer
- Lee Ki-woo as Ryu Ki-woo
- Ha Seok-jin as Ha Seok-jin
- Claudia Kim as Kim Soo-hyun - an easygoing variety producer
- Jung So-min as Jung So-min
- Im Si-wan as Yim Si-wan
- Choi Jung-woo as Ryu Jung-woo
- Park Joon-geum as Park Joon-geum
- Kim Yeon-woo as Kim Yeon-woo
- Go Kyung-pyo as Kim Kyung-pyo
- Simon Dominic as Ssam D
- Kim Ye-won as Kim Ye-won

=== Supporting characters ===
- Park Eun-ji as Park Eun-ji
- Kim Seung-pil as cameraman
- Woo Hye-jin as Choi Yoon-hee
- Sa Mi-ja as Jung-woo's mother
- Jung Ga-ram as Jung Ga-ram
- Yeom Dong-heon as Jung-woo's friend
- Ahn Hye-kyung as lawyer
- Choi Eun-kyung as president of education consulting company

=== Cameo appearances ===
- Park Myung-soo as Ascetic Geosung
- Julien Kang as Joon-geum's fan
- Lee Chae-young as Seok-jin's first love
- Park Se-mi as high school student on blind date
- Hyemi as high school student on blind date
- Park Mi-sun as Park Mi-sun
- Kim Young-ok as Joon-geum's mother
- Yoo So-young as So-ra
- Hwang Kwang-hee as Ha Kwang-hee, Seok-jin's younger brother (ep 76-77)
- Ha Dong-hoon as Rapper H
