= Joo Da-young =

South Korean actress (born 1995)

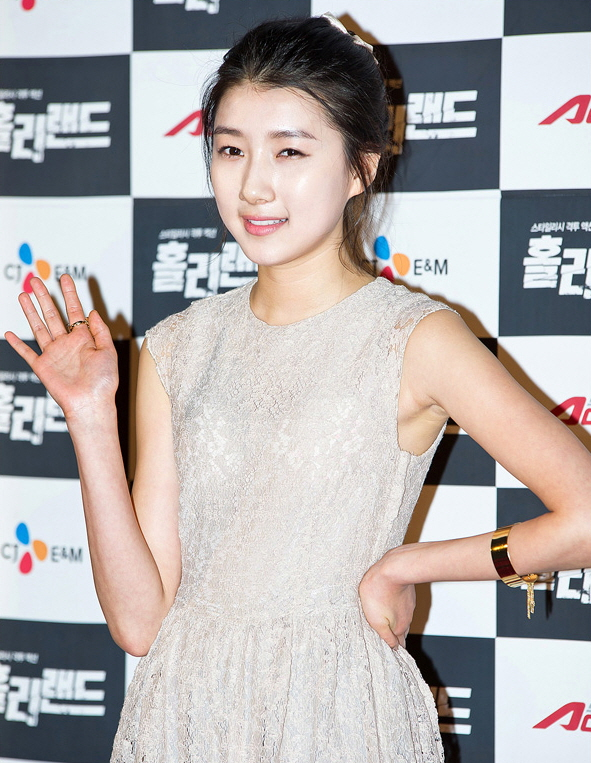
- Joo in April 2012
- Born: June 16, 1995 (age 31); Jeungsan-myeon, Gimcheon, South Korea
- Other name: Joo Ah-reum (주아름)
- Education: Chung-Ang University - Theater and Film
- Occupation: Actress
- Years active: 1997–present
- Agent: Taepung Entertainment

Korean name
- Hangul: 주다영
- RR: Ju Dayeong
- MR: Chu Tayŏng

Joo Da-young (Korean: 주다영; born June 16, 1995) is a South Korean actress. She graduated from Chung-Ang University, Department of Theater and Film in 2014. She started her acting career as a child actress in 1999 with KBS1 television series TV Novel: Sister's Mirror and TV Novel: Plum Sonata (2001). She has appeared in television series Dae Jang Geum (2003), Twinkle Twinkle (2011), Feast of the Gods (2012) and 2016 film Pure Love, among many others. She adopted the stage name Joo Ah-reum in 2018. She is appearing in romance TV series, Be My Dream Family in (2021).

== Filmography ==
=== Film ===
Year	Title	Role
2004	Taegukgi	Young-ja
2004	Dead Friend	young Su-in
2005	The Castle Where the Children Live (animated)	Sam-yi (voice)
2008	Crossing	Mi-seon
2009	Private Eye	Ok-yi
2009	White Night	young Lee Ji-ah
2010	Bo-min (short film)	Yeon-hee
2011	Persimmon	Bom-yi
2013	Farewell	Myung-hee
2014	Mentor (short film)	Jung-in
2014	Mourning Grave	Seong-hee
2015	Hips Don't Lie	
2016	Pure Love	Gil-ja
2016	Dead Again	Hye-in
2018	The Princess and the Matchmaker	Princess Yeo-hee
2021	Camellia	Jeong Yoon-ah

=== Television series ===
Year	Title	Role	Network
1999	KBS TV Novel: "Sister's Mirror"		KBS1
2001	KBS TV Novel: "Plum Sonata"		KBS1
2003	Jewel in the Palace	young Noh Chang-ee	MBC
2003	Not Divorced	Song Min-ji	KBS2
2005	Rainbow Romance	young Im Eun-kyung (guest, episode 3)	MBC
2006	Ballad of Seodong	Maek Do-soo's granddaughter (guest, episode 55)	SBS
2008	The Great King, Sejong	Princess Jeongso	KBS2
2010	The Slave Hunters	Eun-sil	KBS2
2010	The Great Merchant	Mak-soon (young Oh Moon-seon)	KBS1
2010	Face Me and Smile	Yoon-seo	EBS
2011	Real School!	Joo Da-young	MBC Every 1
2011	Twinkle Twinkle	Joo Hye-rin	MBC
2011	High Kick: Revenge of the Short Legged	President of the Ahn Jong-seok Fan Club (guest, episode 37)	MBC
2012	Feast of the Gods	young Song Yeon-woo	MBC
2012	Holy Land	Jeon Sang-mi	Super Action
2012	Ugly Cake	Kim Ye-bin	MBC
2013	My Kids Give Me a Headache	Single mother (guest, episode 32)	jTBC
2014	Inspiring Generation	young Gaya Deguchi	KBS2
2014	Dr. Frost	Park Han-sol	OCN
2015	The Man in the Mask	young Yoo Min-hee	KBS2
2015	Mrs. Cop	Jang Eun-yung	SBS
2015	Sweet Home, Sweet Honey	Choi Ji-ah	KBS1
2016	Spark	Won Jae-kyung	Naver TV Cast
2016	My Romantic Some Recipe	Ahn Min-nyeo	Naver TV Cast
2020	Graceful Friends	young Nam Jeong-hae	JTBC
2021	Be My Dream Family	Min Ga-eun	KBS1

=== Music video appearances ===
Year	Song title	Artist
2002	"Leaning on the Time"	Eve
2004	"But"	JnC
2004	"And the Last Kiss"	Piano
2011	"Come Back to Me"	Taeha

== Discography ==
Year	Title	Notes
2005	The Spirit of Gaya Wooreuk	Musical theatre
2011	"Black Suit New Girl"	Performed at the 10th International Congress on AIDS in Asia and the Pacific
2013	Guess How Much I Love You	Korean narration
