= Monthly Magazine Home =

2021 South Korean television drama series

- Promotional poster
- Also known as: Monthly Home
- Hangul: 월간 집
- Hanja: 月刊 집
- Lit.: Monthly House
- RR: Wolgan jip
- MR: Wŏlgan chip
- Genre: Drama; Romance
- Created by: JTBC; iQIYI
- Written by: Myeong Soo-hyeon
- Directed by: Lee Chang-min
- Starring: Jung So-min; Kim Ji-seok; Jung Gun-joo; Kim Won-hae
- Composer: Ha Geun-young
- Country of origin: South Korea
- Original language: Korean
- No. of episodes: 16

Production
- Executive producer: Lee Se-young
- Producers: Park Jun-seo; Park Sang-sang; Kwon Min-kyung; Kim Bo-reum
- Running time: 70 minutes
- Production company: JTBC Studios

Original release
- Network: JTBC
- Release: June 16 – August 5, 2021

Monthly Magazine Home (Korean: 월간 집) is a South Korean television series directed by Lee Chang-min and starring Jung So-min, Kim Ji-seok, Jung Gun-joo and Kim Won-hae. The series follows the story of a 'house building' romance of a man who 'buys' houses and a woman who 'lives' in houses. It was premiered on JTBC on June 16, 2021, and aired every Wednesday and Thursday at 21:00 (KST) till August 5, 2021. It is also available for streaming on iQIYI.

== Synopsis ==
It is a story about the romance of a man who 'buys' a house and a woman who 'lives' in the house. Na Young-won (Jung So-min) is an editor of the monthly living magazine 'House'. Yu Ja-seong (Kim Ji-seok) is the representative. The series tells the stories of the editors through House Magazine.

== Cast ==
=== Main ===
- Kim Ji-seok as Yu Ja-seong

Real estate property owner and investment expert, 'a dragon from Gaecheon, Gae-ryong'.

- Jung So-min as Na Young-won

Editor of Lifestyle Magazine 'Monthly House'.

=== Supporting ===
- Jung Gun-joo as Shin Gyeom

Photographer, a gold spoon, and a camping enthusiast who lives in a shade tent worth 1.2 million won.

- Kim Won-hae as Choi Go, editor-in-chief of 'Monthly House'.
- Chae Jung-an as Yeo Eui-ju, 13-year editor, 'real estate down-turnist', so she lives with a monthly rent of 1 million won.
- Ahn Chang-hwan as Nam Sang-soon, a living magazine editor of 'Monthly House', who dreams of winning a housing subscription.
- Yoon Ji-on as Chang, YouTuber
- Lee Hwa-kyum as Yuk Mi-ra, a first year editor's assistant
- Ahn Hyun-ho as Gye Joo-hee, a first-year editor assistant.
- Jeong Seung-gil as Young-Won, Na Young-won's father
- Lee Jung-eun as Choi Go's wife

=== Special appearances ===
- Kim Dong-young as Na Young-won's ex-boyfriend
- Shim Yi-young as Young-won's ex-boyfriend's wife
- Lee Jung-eun as Lee Su-jeong, proof reader
- Kim So-eun as Nam Sang-soon's girlfriend called as cutie pie.
- Ha Seok-jin as model (Ep. 11)
- Park Ha-sun as model (Ep. 11)
- Lee Yi-kyung as Min-guk, freelance reporter

== Production ==
=== Casting ===
On April 20, 2020, Jung So-min received an offer to play Na Young-won, a magazine editor with 10 years experience for the magazine 'Home'. On September 22, 2020, Chae Jung-an considered to play the 13-year editor of the magazine. In October 2020, the cast line up was announced. In January, 2021, the members of the 'Monthly House' were revealed by the production crew. Jung So-min and Kim Ji-suk have previously starred together in the 2013 KBS drama special You Came to Me and Became a Star, this is their second time working together. Chae Jung-an is appearing in the TV series after a hiatus of 2 years. She last appeared in 2019 JTBC series Legal High.

=== Filming ===
Principal photography of the series began in the end of July 2020 and the filming ended on April 1, 2021. The photos of Jung So-min and Kim Ji-seok from filming site were released on February 23, 2021.

== Release ==
On April 27, 2021, the release date of the series with a teaser poster was announced. The series was premiered on June 16, 2021, on JTBC at 21:00 KST. Streaming will also be available on IQIYI. The rating was 9.5/10 on IQIYI as of December 17, 2021.

== Original soundtrack ==
Monthly Magazine Home

Soundtrack album by Various
- Released: 2021
- Genre: Soundtrack
- Languages: Korean; English
- Label: Kakao Entertainment

=== Part 1 ===
Released on June 17, 2021
No.	Title	Lyrics	Music	Artist	Length
1.	"Imagine"	Hana	Psycho Tension (YEJUN, Lee Ha-eun)	Hui (Pentagon)	2:38
2.	"Imagine" (Inst.)		Psycho Tension (YEJUN, Lee Ha-eun)		2:38

=== Part 2 ===
Released on June 24, 2021
No.	Title	Lyrics	Music	Artist	Length
1.	"Story Of Us"	Christian Fast; Maria Marcus	The Proof; Christian Fast; Maria Marcus	Jo Yu-ri	3:53
2.	"Story Of Us" (Inst.)		The Proof; Christian Fast; Maria Marcus		3:53

=== Part 3 ===
Released on July 1, 2021
No.	Title	Lyrics	Music	Artist	Length
1.	"That Day" (그런 날)	Ha Geun-young, Kim Ye-sol	Ha Geun-young, Kim Ye-sol	Kwak Jin-eon
2.	"That Day" (Inst.)

=== Part 4 ===
Released on July 8, 2021
No.	Title	Lyrics	Music	Artist	Length
1.	"Here I Am"	Geun-Young Ha, Su-Yeon Lee	Young Ha, Very Berry, Yoo Ji- Eun	John Park	3:47
2.	"Here I Am" (Inst.)				3:47

=== Part 5 ===
Released on July 15, 2021
No.	Title	Lyrics	Music	Artist	Length
1.	"There For You (Prod. AVIN)" (승연)	Avin, slay	Avin, slay, chase	WOODZ (Cho Seung-youn)	3:49
2.	"There For You (Prod. AVIN)" (Inst.)				3:49

=== Part 6 ===
Released on July 22, 2021
No.	Title	Lyrics	Music	Artist	Length
1.	"Common Regrets" (흔한 후회)	Geun-Young Ha, Coma	Ha Geun-Young, Found Out, Coma	Jero	4:18
2.	"Common Regrets" (Inst.)				4:18

=== Part 7 ===
Released on July 28, 2021
No.	Title	Lyrics	Music	Artist	Length
1.	"Your Love A Little More" (그대름 조금 더)	Ha Geun-young, Lee Su-yeon	Ha Geun-young, Lee Su-yeon	Baek A-yeon	3:57
2.	"Your Love A Little More" (Inst.)		Ha Geun-young, Lee Su-yeon		3:57

== Viewership ==
Monthly Magazine Home : South Korea viewers per episode (thousands)

Season	Episode number																Average
Season	1	2	3	4	5	6	7	8	9	10	11	12	13	14	15	16	Average
1	654	N/A	N/A	N/A	N/A	N/A	N/A	N/A	N/A	N/A	N/A	N/A	552	N/A	568	N/A	N/A

Source: Audience measurement performed nationwide by Nielsen Korea

Average TV viewership ratings
Ep.	Original broadcast date	Title	Average audience share (Nielsen Korea)	
Ep.	Original broadcast date	Title	Nationwide	Seoul
1	June 16, 2021	"A Man Who Buys a House, a Woman Who Lives in a House"	3.171% (10th)	3.463% (7th)
2	June 17, 2021	"Hope for My Own House"	2.275% (20th)	N/A
3	June 23, 2021	"Living with a Parasite"	2.430% (17th)	2.951% (9th)
4	June 24, 2021	"If I Could Renovate My Life..."	1.664% (26th)	N/A
5	June 30, 2021	"You Must Live in Your Home to Know it"	2.228% (20th)	N/A
6	July 1, 2021	"You are in My House, You are in My Heart"	1.963% (24th)	N/A
7	July 7, 2021	"He Lives in an Empty House"	2.425% (15th)	N/A
8	July 8, 2021	"House+Love=Home"	1.989% (20th)	N/A
9	July 14, 2021	"A Flower Blooming in a Ruined Heart"	2.249% (16th)	N/A
10	July 15, 2021	"Long-standing House Long-standing Relationship"	1.967% (24th)	N/A
11	July 21, 2021	"A Home Reflects its Owners"	2.363% (18th)	N/A
12	July 22, 2021	"Home, a Container That Holds Life"	1.892% (25th)	N/A
13	July 28, 2021	"A Record of Youth's Home"	2.648% (10th)	2.964% (7th)
14	July 29, 2021	"Meeting the Home of Your Destiny"	2.720% (13th)	2.974% (8th)
15	August 4, 2021	"Building a House, Building Love"	2.873% (10th)	3.133% (7th)
16	August 5, 2021	"A Man Who Buys a House, A Woman Who Has a Home"	2.554% (16th)	N/A
Average			2.338%	— (Note: Due to some unpublished ratings, the exact average rating is unknown.)
In the table above, the blue numbers represent the lowest ratings and the red numbers represent the highest ratings.; N/A denotes that the rating is not known.; This drama airs on a cable channel/pay TV which normally has a relatively smaller audience compared to free-to-air TV/public broadcasters (KBS, SBS, MBC and EBS).
