= Would You Marry Me? (TV series) =

2025 South Korean TV series

- Promotional poster
- Hangul: 우주메리미
- RR: Ujumerimi
- MR: Ujumerimi
- Genre: Romantic comedy
- Written by: Lee Ha-na
- Directed by: Song Hyun-wook; Hwang In-hyeok
- Starring: Choi Woo-shik; Jung So-min
- Music by: Taven
- Country of origin: South Korea
- Original language: Korean
- No. of episodes: 12

Production
- Executive producers: Park Young-soo; Hwang Cheol-min; Yoon Eun-jung
- Producers: Ahn Je-hyun; Shin Sang-yoon; Jo Eun-jeong
- Running time: 70 minutes
- Production companies: Samhwa Networks; Studio S
- Budget: ₩17.94 billion

Original release
- Network: SBS TV
- Release: October 10 – November 15, 2025

Would You Marry Me? (Korean: 우주메리미) is a 2025 South Korean romantic comedy television series starring Choi Woo-shik and Jung So-min. The series tells the story of a fake newlywed couple. It aired on SBS TV from October 10 to November 15, 2025, every Friday and Saturday at 21:50 (KST). It is also available for streaming on Disney+ in selected regions.

== Synopsis ==
Would You Marry Me? is a romantic comedy about a 90-day fake marriage between a man and a woman who are trying to win the grand prize of a luxury home for newlyweds.

== Cast ==
=== Main ===
- Choi Woo-shik as Kim Woo-joo
  - Han Ji-an as young Kim Woo-joo

A brilliant but emotionally scarred heir to South Korea's oldest bakery.

- Jung So-min as Yoo Me-ri
  - Oh Eun-seo as young Yoo Me-ri

A designer who struggles to survive after a broken engagement.

- Seo Bum-june as Kim Woo-joo

A smooth-talking finance man and Me-ri's ex-fiancé.

- Shin Seul-ki as Yoon Jin-kyung
  - Ki So-yu as young Yoon Jin-kyung

A family doctor who harbors a one-sided love for her longtime friend Woo-joo.

- Bae Na-ra as Baek Sang-hyun

An ambitious department store executive who rose from poverty through connections.

=== Supporting ===
==== Kim Woo-joo's family ====
- Jung Ae-ri as Joo Pil-nyeon

Woo-joo's grandmother.

- Baek Ji-won as Kim Mi-yeon

Woo-joo's aunt.

- Kim Young-min as Jang Han-joo

Woo-joo's uncle.

- Go Geon-han as Jang Eung-soo

Woo-joo's cousin.

- Sa Gang as Kim Joo-hee

Woo-joo's grandmother's secretary.

==== Myungsoondang Marketing Team ====
- Heo Ji-na as Oh Seon-hee

The marketing team manager at Myungsoondang.

- Jang Se-yeon as Han Won-seok
- Kim Si-eun as Cha Se-jeong

==== People at Mary Design ====
- Jang Ha-eun as Shin Song-hee.

==== People at Beaute Department Store ====
- Park Yeon-woo as Lee Seong-woo

==== Yoo Me-ri's family ====
- Yoon Bok-in as Oh Young-sook

Yoo Me-ri's mother.

==== Ex-fiancé Kim Woo-joo's family ====
- Kim Young-joo as Cheon Eun-sook

Yoo Me-ri's ex-mother-in-law; Kim Woo-joo's mother.

- Moon Seung-you as Kim Jin-hwa

Yoo Me-ri's ex-sister-in-law; Kim Woo-joo's older sister.

==== Other ====
- Kwon Hae-sung as Deputy Manager Go

=== Special appearances ===
- Lee Soo-min as Jenny

The third party behind the break-up of Yoo Me-ri and her ex-fiancé Kim Woo-joo.

- Oh Sang-uk as himself

== Production ==
=== Development ===
Produced by SBS' content production subsidiary Studio S and Samhwa Networks, written by Lee Ha-na, who wrote Cunning Single Lady (2014), and directed by Song Hyun-wook and Hwang In-hyeok.

Samhwa Networks announced on August 28, 2025, that it signed a ₩17.94 billion won supply and production contract with Studio S for the drama "Would You Marry Me".

=== Casting ===
In December 2024, Choi Woo-shik and Jung So-min were reportedly cast as the lead.

In February 2025, Choi and Jung were reportedly confirmed to appear.

== Release ==
The first images from the first script reading were released on September 2, 2025. The series premiered on SBS TV starting October 10, 2025, airing every Friday and Saturday at 21:50 (KST). It is also available for streaming on Disney+ under the Hulu Originals label in selected markets.

== Reception ==
=== Critical response ===
Despite streaming restrictions in Europe Middle East India and some Asian countries, "Would You Marry Me" achieved the highest number of points on Disney+ among all Korean series streamed on Disney+, reaching 173 points. It became the first Korean series to reach over 100 points, a significant success on a global scale.

== Viewership ==
Would You Marry Me? : South Korea viewers per episode (millions)

Season	Episode number												Average
Season	1	2	3	4	5	6	7	8	9	10	11	12	Average
1	1.094	1.252	1.093	1.061	1.378	1.388	1.168	1.540	1.196	1.496	1.441	1.726	1.319

Source: Audience measurement performed nationwide by Nielsen Media Research.

Average TV viewership ratings
Ep.	Original broadcast date	Average audience share (Nielsen Korea)	
Ep.	Original broadcast date	Nationwide	Seoul
1	October 10, 2025	5.6% (5th)	6.1% (2nd)
2	October 11, 2025	6.4% (3rd)	7.0% (2nd)
3	October 17, 2025	6.1% (6th)	6.3% (4th)
4	October 18, 2025	5.6% (5th)	6.0% (3rd)
5	October 24, 2025	7.5% (4th)	7.8% (3rd)
6	October 25, 2025	7.1% (2nd)	7.2% (2nd)
7	October 31, 2025	6.5% (6th)	6.9% (2nd)
8	November 1, 2025	7.4% (2nd)	7.7% (2nd)
9	November 7, 2025	6.8% (3rd)	7.5% (1st)
10	November 8, 2025	7.9% (2nd)	8.5% (2nd)
11	November 14, 2025	7.9% (2nd)	8.6% (2nd)
12	November 15, 2025	9.1% (2nd)	9.6% (2nd)
Average		7.0%	7.4%
In the table above, the blue numbers represent the lowest ratings and the red numbers represent the highest ratings.
